= Ukrainians in Russia =

Ukrainian ethnic minority in Russia

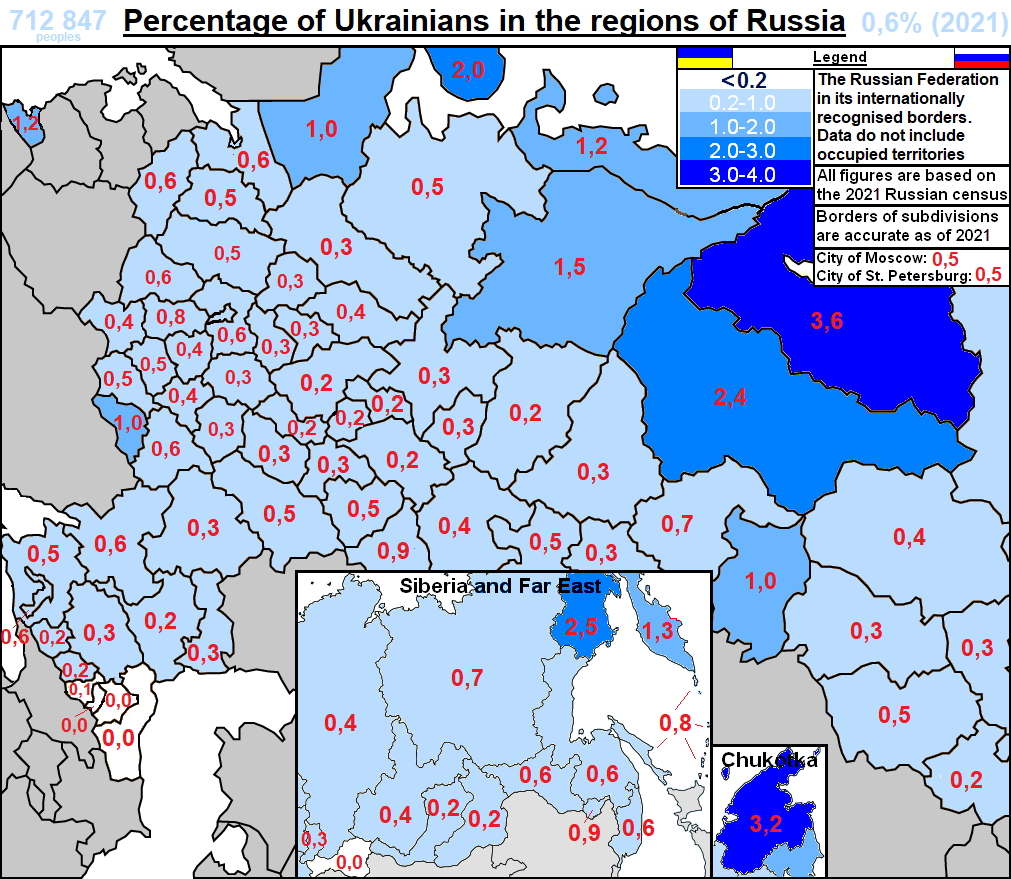

Total population
- 884 007 (2021)

Languages
- Russian (99.8%, 2002), Ukrainian

Religion
- Predominantly Christians (55%)

Related ethnic groups
- Kuban Cossacks, other Slavic peoples (especially East Slavs)

The Russian census identified that there were more than 5,864,000 Ukrainians and Ukrainian citizens living in Russia in 2015, representing over 4.01% of the total population of the Russian Federation and comprising the eighth-largest ethnic group. In February 2022 there were roughly 3 million Ukrainians who fled to Russia as refugees. Most of them identified as ethnic Russians. The number kept increasing throughout the war. Estimates for Ukrainians fleeing towards Russia range from 3 to 10 million.

In February 2014, there were 2.6 million Ukrainian citizens in the territory of Russia, two-thirds of the labour migrants; however, after Russia annexed Crimea and started the war in Donbas, the number was estimated to have risen to 4.5 million. According to the 2021 Russian census, 884,007 people identified themselves as ethnically Ukrainian.

== History ==
=== 17th and 18th centuries ===
The Treaty of Pereiaslav of 1654 led to Ukraine becoming a protectorate of the Tsardom of Russia. This resulted in increased Ukrainian immigration to Russia, initially to Sloboda Ukraine but also to the Don lands and the area of the Volga river. There was a significant migration to Moscow, particularly by church activists, priests and monks, scholars and teachers, artists, translators, singers, and merchants. In 1652, twelve singers under the direction of Ternopolsky moved to Moscow, and thirteen graduates of the Kyiv-Mohyla Collegium moved to teach the Moscow gentry. Many priests and church administrators migrated from Ukraine; in particular, Ukrainian clergy established the Andreyevsky Monastery, which influenced the Russian Orthodox Church, in particular the reform policies of Patriarch Nikon which led to the Old Believer Raskol (English: schism). The influence of Ukrainian clergy continued to grow, especially after 1686, when the Metropolia of Kyiv was transferred from the Patriarch of Constantinople to the Patriarch of Moscow.

After the abolishment of the Patriarch's chair by Peter I, Ukrainian Stephen Yavorsky became Metropolitan of Moscow, followed by Feofan Prokopovich. Five Ukrainians were metropolitans, and 70 of 127 bishops in Russia's Orthodox hierarchy were recent emigres from Kyiv. Students of the Kyiv-Mohyla Collegium began schools and seminaries in many Russian eparchies. By 1750, over 125 such institutions were opened, and their graduates practically controlled the Russian church, obtaining key posts through to the late 18th century. Under Prokopovich, the Russian Academy of Sciences was opened in 1724, which was chaired from 1746 by Ukrainian Kirill Razumovsky.

The Moscow court had a choir established in 1713 with 21 singers from Ukraine. The conductor for a period of time was A. Vedel. In 1741, 44 men, 33 women, and 55 girls were moved to St. Petersburg from Ukraine to sing and entertain. Composer Maksym Berezovsky also worked in St. Petersburg at the time. A significant Ukrainian presence was also seen in the Academy of Arts.

The Ukrainian presence in the Russian Army also grew significantly. The greatest influx happened after the Battle of Poltava in 1709. Large numbers of Ukrainians settled around St. Petersburg and were employed in the building of the city.

A separate category of emigrants were those deported to Moscow by the Russian government for demonstrating anti-Russian sentiment. The deported were brought to Moscow initially for investigation, then exiled to Siberia, Arkhangelsk or the Solovetsky Islands. Among the deported were Ukrainian cossacks including D. Mhohohrishny, Ivan Samoylovych, and Petro Doroshenko. Others include all the family of hetman Ivan Mazepa, A. Vojnarovsky, and those in Mazepa's Cossack forces that returned to Russia. Some were imprisoned in exile for the rest of their lives, such as hetman Pavlo Polubotok, Pavlo Holovaty, P. Hloba and Petro Kalnyshevsky.

=== 19th century ===
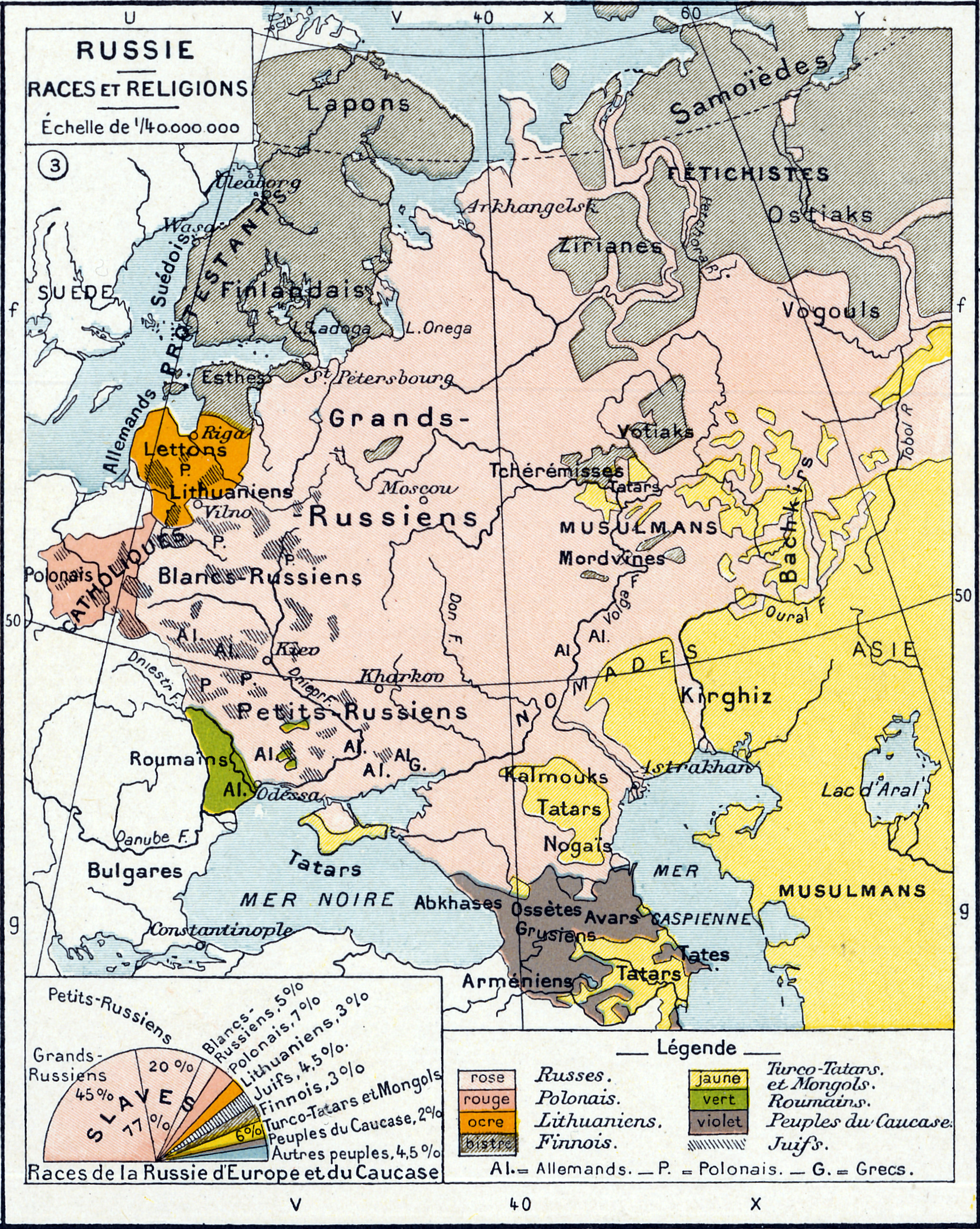
Ethnic map of European Russia before the First World War

Beginning in the 19th century, there was a continuous migration from Belarus, Ukraine and Northern Russia to settle the distant areas of the Russian Empire. The promise of free fertile land was an important factor for many peasants, who until 1861 lived under serfdom. In the colonization of the new lands, a significant contribution was made by ethnic Ukrainians. Initially Ukrainians colonised border territories in the Caucasus. Most of these settlers came from Left-bank Ukraine and Slobozhanshchyna and mainly settled in the Stavropol and Terek areas. Some compact areas of the Don, Volga, and Urals were also settled.

The Ukrainians created large settlements within Russia, becoming the majority in certain centres. They continued fostering their traditions, their language, and their architecture. Their village structure and administration differed somewhat from the Russian population that surrounded them. Where populations were mixed, Russification often took place. The size and geographical area of the Ukrainian settlements were first seen in the course of the Russian Empire Census of 1897, which noted language but not ethnicity. A total of 22,380,551 Ukrainian speakers were recorded, with 1,020,000 Ukrainians in European Russia and 209,000 in Asian Russia. (Note: Asian Russia statistics exclude the Caucasus.)

=== Formation of Ukrainian borders ===
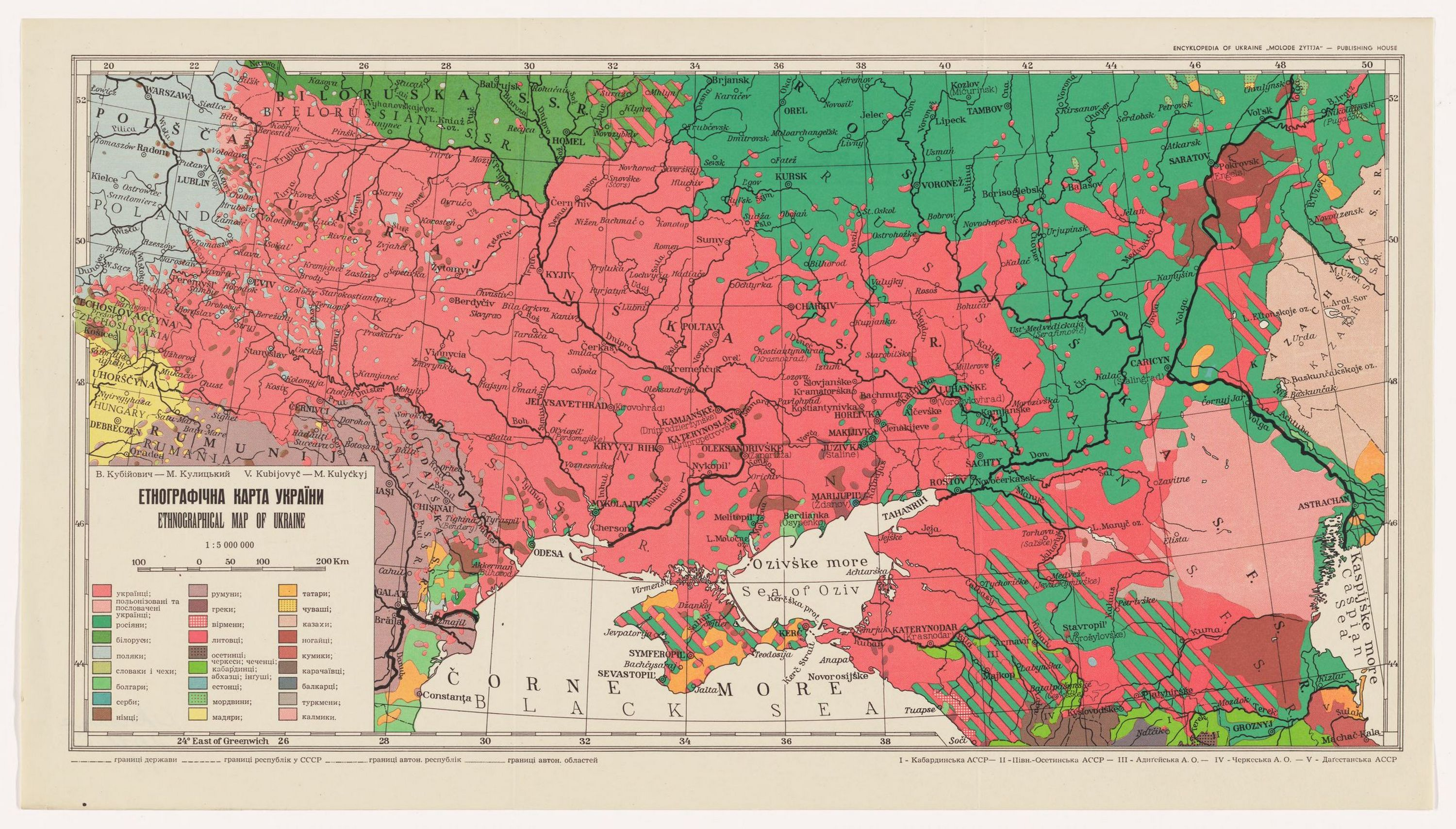
Ethnographic map of Ukraine, showing ethnographic boundaries of ethnic Ukrainians in the early 20th century as claimed by Ukrainian émigrés Volodymyr Kubijovyč and Oleksander Kulchytsky

The first Russian Empire Census, conducted in 1897, gave statistics regarding language use in the Russian Empire according to the administrative borders. Extensive use of Little Russian (and in some cases dominance) was noted in the nine south-western Governorates and the Kuban Oblast. When the future borders of the Ukrainian state were marked, the results of the census were taken into consideration. As a result, the ethnographic borders of Ukraine in the 20th century were twice as large as the Cossack Hetmanate that had been incorporated into the Russian Empire in the 18th century.

Certain regions had mixed populations made up of both Ukrainian and Russian ethnicities, and various minorities. These included the territory of Sloboda and the Donbas. These territories were between Ukraine and Russia. This left a large community of ethnic Ukrainians on the Russian side of the border. The borders of the short-lived Ukrainian People's Republic were largely preserved by the Ukrainian SSR.

In the course of the mid-1920s administrative reforms, some territory initially under the Ukrainian SSR was ceded to the Russian SFSR, such as the Taganrog and Shakhty cities in the eastern Donbas. At the same time, the Ukrainian SSR gained several territories that were amalgamated into the Sumy Oblast in Sloboda region.

=== Late 20th century and early 21st century ===
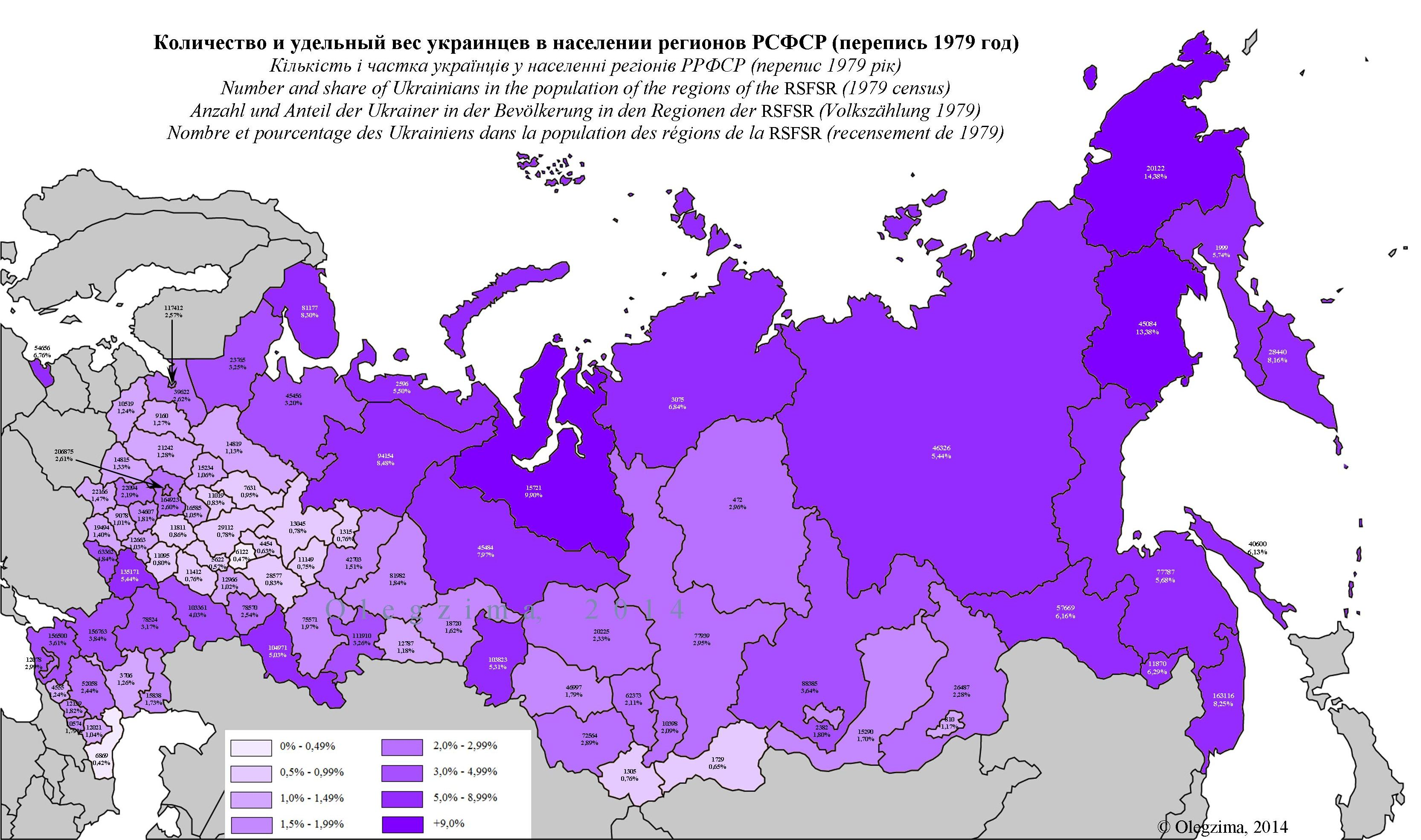
Number and share of Ukrainians in the population of the regions of the RSFSR (1979 census)

The Ukrainian cultural renaissance in Russia began at the end of the 1980s, with the formation of the Slavutych Society in Moscow and the Ukrainian Cultural Centre named after T. Shevchenko in Leningrad (now Saint Petersburg).

In 1991, the Ukraina Society organized a conference in Kyiv with delegates from the various new Ukrainian community organizations of the Eastern Diaspora. By 1991, over 20 such organizations were in existence. By 1992, 600 organizations were registered in Russia alone. The congress helped to consolidate the efforts of these organizations. From 1992, regional congresses began to take place, organized by the Ukrainian organizations of Prymoria, Tyumen Oblast, Siberia and the Far East. In March 1992, the Union of Ukrainian organizations in Moscow was founded. The Union of Ukrainians in Russia was founded in May 1992.

The term "Eastern Diaspora" has been used since 1992 to describe Ukrainians living in the former USSR, as opposed to the Western Ukrainian Diaspora which was used until then to describe all Ukrainian diaspora outside the Union. The Eastern Diaspora is estimated to number approximately 6.8 million, while the Western Diaspora is estimated to number approximately 5 million.

In February 2009, about 3.5 million Ukrainian citizens were estimated to be working in the Russian Federation, particularly in Moscow and in the construction industry. According to Volodymyr Yelchenko, the Ambassador of Ukraine to the Russian Federation, there were no state schools in Russia with a program for teaching school subjects in the Ukrainian language as of August 2010; he considered "the correction of this situation" as one of his top priorities.

As of 2007, the number of Ukrainian illegal immigrants in Russia has been estimated as being between 3 and 11 million.

In a 2011 poll, 49% of Ukrainians said that they had relatives living in Russia.

=== Russo-Ukrainian War ===
During the Russo-Ukrainian War that began in 2014, some Ukrainians living in Russia have complained of being labelled a "Banderite" (follower of Stepan Bandera), even when they are from parts of Ukraine where Stepan Bandera has no considerable support.

Starting from 2014, a number of Ukrainian activists and organisations were prosecuted in Russia based on political grounds. Some notable examples include the case of Oleg Sentsov, which was described by Amnesty International as a "Stalinist era trial", the closure of a Ukrainian library in Moscow and prosecution of the library staff, and a ban of Ukrainian organisations in Russia, such as Ukrainian World Congress.

As of September 2015, there were 2.6 million Ukrainians living in Russia, more than half of them classified as "guest workers". A million more had arrived in the previous eighteen months (although critics have accused the FMS and media of circulating exaggerated figures). About 400,000 had applied for refugee status and almost 300,000 had asked for temporary residence status, with another 600,000 considered to be in breach of migration rules. By November 2017, there were 427,240 applicant asylum-seekers and refugees from Ukraine registered in Russia, over 185,000 of them having received temporary asylum, and fewer than 590 with refugee status. The refugees were from the territories of Donetsk People's Republic and Luhansk People's Republics taken over by pro-Russian separatists since the Russo-Ukrainian War. Most refugees have headed to rural areas in central Russia. Major destinations for Ukrainian migrants have included Karelia, Vorkuta, Magadan Oblast; oblasts such as Magadan and Yakutia are destinations of a government relocation program since the vast majority avoid big cities like Moscow and Saint Petersburg.

During the 2022 Russian invasion of Ukraine, an estimated 2.8 million Ukrainians had arrived in Russia as of September 2022; the UN Human Rights Office stated: "There have been credible allegations of forced transfers of unaccompanied children to Russian occupied territory, or to the Russian Federation itself."

On 22 January 2024 Volodymyr Zelenskyy, the president of Ukraine, has signed a presidential decree "On areas of the Russian Federation historically populated by Ukrainians", urging the Ukrainian government to take measures to "preserve the national identity of Ukrainians in Russia", "counter misinformation regarding the history and present of Ukrainians in Russia" and "develop relations between Ukrainians and other peoples enslaved by Russia".

== Ukrainian population centres in Russia ==
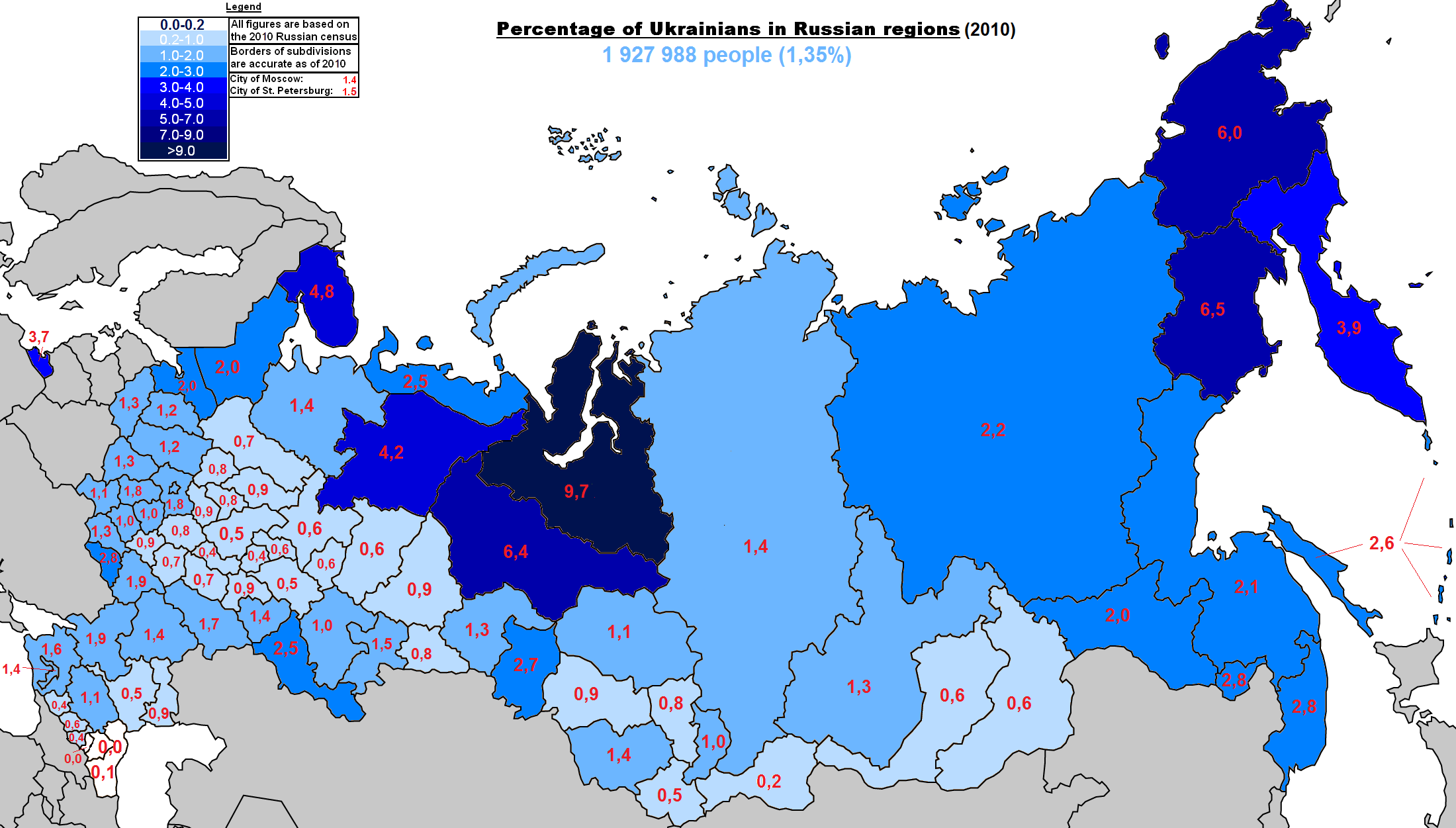
Percentage of Ukrainians in regions of Russia in 2010

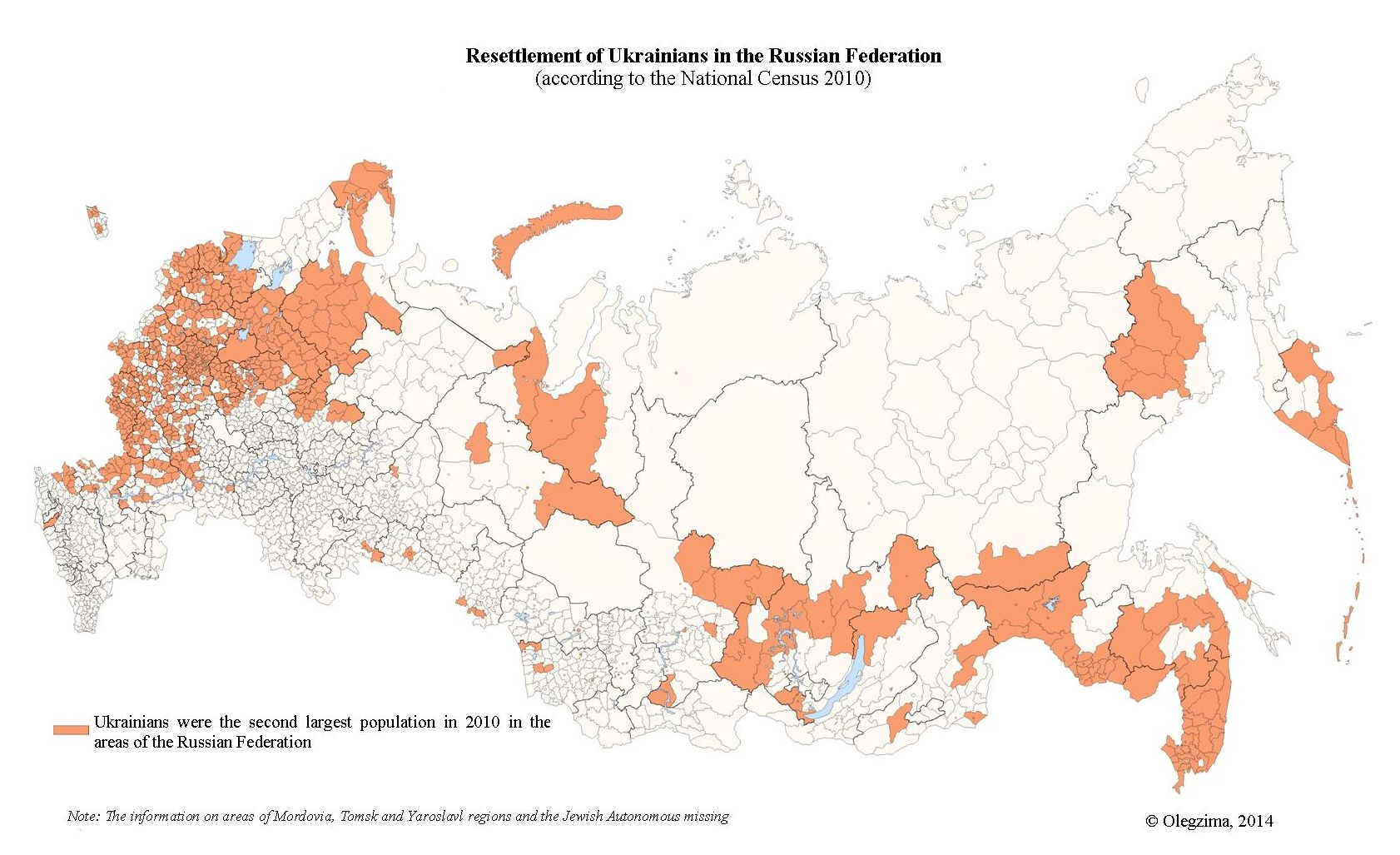
Areas in Russia where Ukrainians were the largest minority, 2010

=== Kuban ===
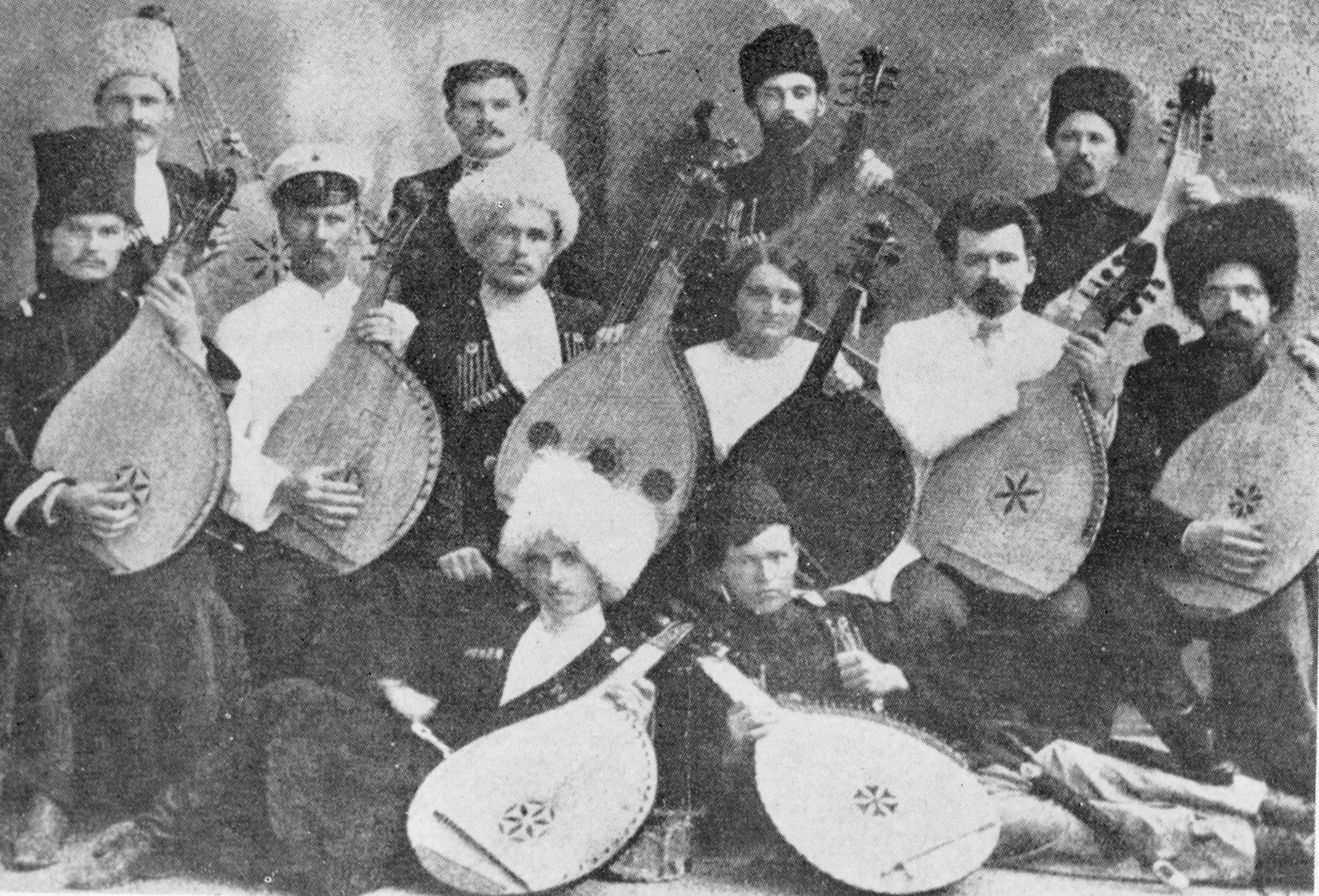
The first bandura school in 1913, organised in the Kuban, directed by Vasyl Yemetz (centre)

The original Black Sea Cossacks colonised the Kuban region from 1792. Following the Caucasus War and the subsequent colonisation of the Circaucasus, the Black Sea Cossacks intermixed with other ethnic groups, including the indigenous Circassian population.

According to the 1897 census, 47.3% of the Kuban population (including extensive latter 19th-century non-Cossack migrants from both Ukraine and Russia) referred to their native language as Little Russian (the official term for the Ukrainian language), while 42.6% referred to their native language as Great Russian. Few оf the cultural production in Kuban from the 1890s until 1914, such as plays, stories and music, were written in the Ukrainian language, and one of the first political parties in Kuban was the Ukrainian Revolutionary Party. During the Russian Civil War, the Kuban Cossack Rada formed a military alliance with the Ukrainian People's Republic and declared Ukrainian to be the official language of the Kuban National Republic. This decision was not supported uniformly by the Cossacks themselves, and soon the Rada itself was dissolved by the Russian White Denikin's Volunteer Army.

In the 1920s, a policy of Decossackization was pursued. At the same time, the Bolshevik authorities supported policies that promoted the Ukrainian language and self-identity, opening 700 Ukrainian-language schools and a Ukrainian department in the local university. Russian historians claim that Cossacks were in this way forcibly Ukrainized, while Ukrainian historians claim that Ukrainization in Kuban merely paralleled Ukrainization in Ukraine itself, where people were being taught in their native language. According to the 1926 census, there were nearly a million Ukrainians registered in the Kuban Okrug alone (or 62% of the total population). During this period many Soviet repressions were tested on the Cossack lands, particularly the Black Boards that led to the Soviet famine of 1932–1934 in the Kuban. Yet by the mid-1930s there was an abrupt policy change of Soviet attitude towards Ukrainians in Russia. In the Kuban, the Ukrainization policy was halted and reversed. In 1936 the Kuban Cossack Chorus was re-formed as were individual Cossack regiments in the Red Army. By the end of the 1930s many Cossacks' descendants chose to identify themselves as Russians. From that time onwards, almost all of the self-identified Ukrainians in the Kuban were non-Cossacks; the Soviet Census of 1989 showed that a total of 251,198 people in Krasnodar Kray (including Adyghe Autonomous Oblast) were born in the Ukrainian SSR. In the 2002 census, the number of people who identified as Ukrainians in the Kuban was recorded to be 151,788. Despite the fact that most of the descendants of Kuban Cossacks identify themselves as Russian nationals. Many elements of their culture originate from Ukraine, such as the Kuban Bandurist music, and the Balachka dialect.

=== Moscow ===
Moscow has had a significant Ukrainian presence since the 17th century. The original Ukrainian settlement bordered Kitai-gorod. No longer having a Ukrainian character, it is today known as Maroseyka (a corruption of Malorusseyka, or Little Russian). During Soviet times the main street, Maroseyka, was named after the Ukrainian Cossack hetman Bohdan Khmelnytsky. After Moscow State University was founded in 1755, many students from Ukraine studied there. Many of these students had commenced their studies at the Kyiv-Mohyla Academy.

In the first years after the revolution of 1905, Moscow was one of the major centres of the Ukrainian movement for self-awareness. The monthly magazine Zoria (Зоря, English: Star) was edited by A. Krymsky, and from 1912 to 1917 the Ukrainian cultural and literary magazine Ukrainskaya zhizn was also published there (edited by Symon Petliura). Books in the Ukrainian language were published in Moscow from 1912 and Ukrainian theatrical troupes of M. Kropovnytsky and M. Sadovsky were constantly performing in Moscow.

Moscow's Ukrainians played an active role in opposing the attempted coup in August 1991.

According to the 2001 census, there are 253,644 Ukrainians living in the city of Moscow, making them the third-largest ethnic group in that city after Russians and Tatars. A further 147,808 Ukrainians live in the Moscow region. The Ukrainian community in Moscow operates a cultural centre on Arbat Street, whose head is appointed by the Ukrainian government. It publishes two Ukrainian-language newspapers and has organized Ukrainian-language Saturday and Sunday schools.

=== Saint Petersburg ===
When Saint Petersburg was the capital during the Russian Empire era, it attracted people from many nations including Ukraine. The Ukrainian poets Taras Shevchenko and Dmytro Bortniansky spent most of their lives in Saint Petersburg. Ivan Mazepa, carrying out the orders of Peter I, was responsible for sending many Ukrainians to help build St Petersburg.

According to the 2001 census, there are 87,119 Ukrainians living in the city of St Petersburg, where they constitute the largest non-Russian ethnic group. The former mayor, Valentina Matviyenko (née Tyutina), was born in Khmelnytskyi Oblast of western Ukraine and is of Ukrainian ethnicity.

=== Green Ukraine ===
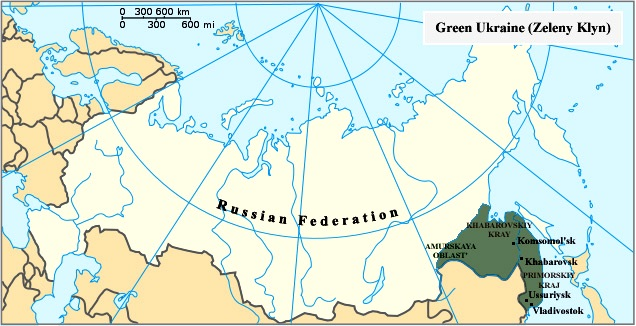
Green Ukraine is the historical Ukrainian name of the land in the Russian Far East area.

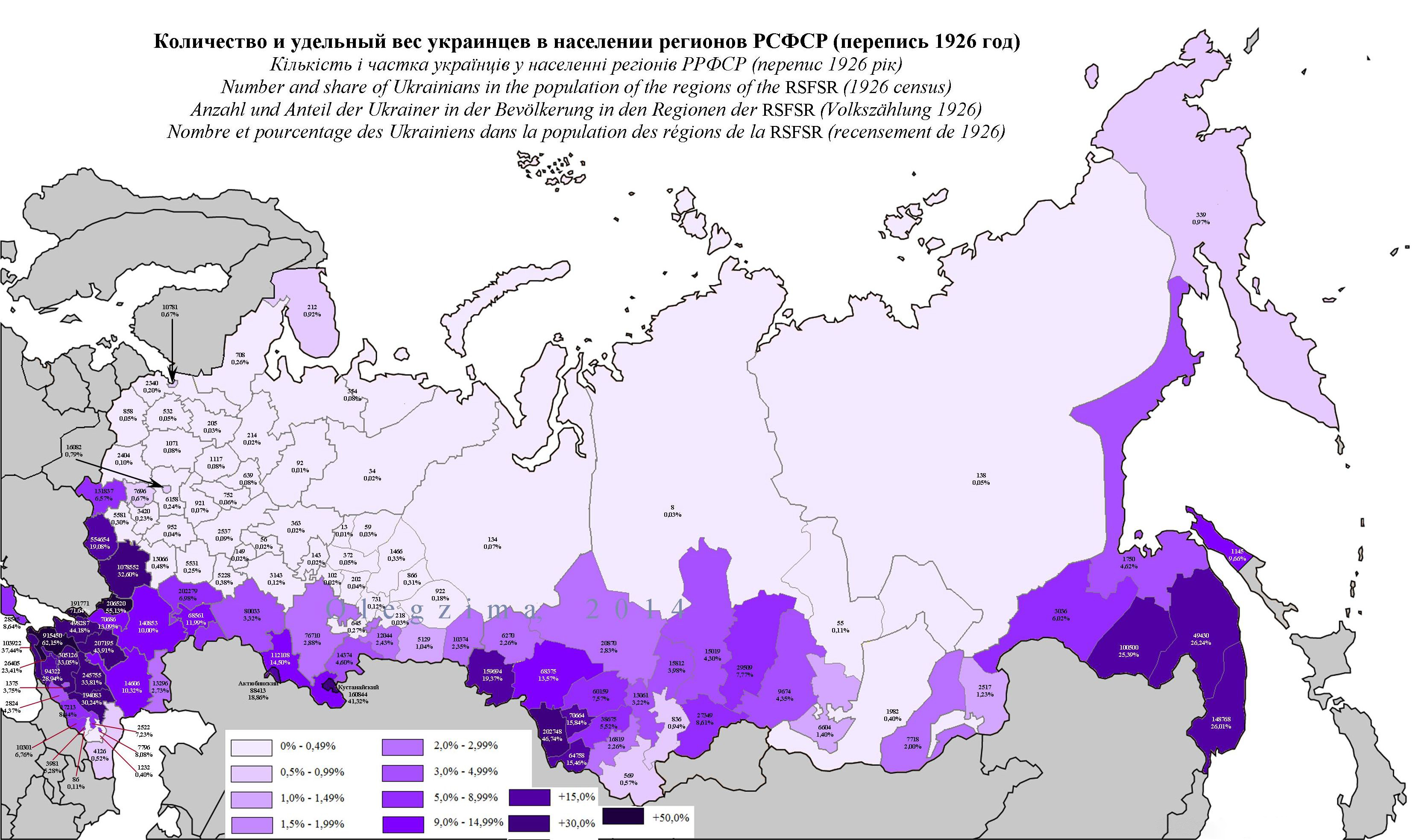
Number and share of Ukrainians in the population of the regions of the RSFSR (1926 census)

Green Ukraine is often referred to as Zeleny Klyn. This is an area of land settled by Ukrainians which is a part of Far Eastern Siberia, located on the Amur River and the Pacific Ocean. It was named by Ukrainian settlers. The territory consists of over 1,000,000 square kilometres (390,000 sq mi) and had a population of 3.1 million in 1958.

Ukrainians made up 26% of the population in 1926. In the last Russian census, 94,058 people in Primorsky Krai claimed Ukrainian ethnicity, making Ukrainians the second-largest ethnic group and largest ethnic minority.

=== Grey Ukraine ===
The Ukrainian settlement of Grey Ukraine or Siry Klyn (literally the "grey wedge") developed around the city of Omsk in western Siberia. M. Bondarenko, an emigrant from Poltava province, wrote before World War I: "The city of Omsk looks like a typical Moscovite city, but the bazaar and markets speak Ukrainian". All around the city of Omsk stood Ukrainian villages. The settlement of people beyond the Ural mountains began in the 1860s. There were attempts to form an autonomous Ukrainian region in 1917–1920. Altogether, 1,604,873 emigrants from Ukraine settled the area before 1914. According to the 2010 Russian census, 77,884 people of the Omsk region identified themselves as Ukrainians, making Ukrainians the third-largest ethnic group there after Russians and Kazakhs.

=== Yellow Ukraine ===
The settlement of Yellow Ukraine, or Zholty Klyn (the Yellow Wedge) was founded soon after the Treaty of Pereyaslav of 1659 as the eastern border of the second Zasechnaya Cherta. Named after the yellow steppes on the middle and lower Volga, the colony co-existed with the Volga Cossacks, and colonists primarily settled around the city of Saratov. In addition to Ukrainians, Volga Germans and Mordovians migrated to Zholty Klyn in large numbers. As of 2014, most of the population is integrated throughout the region, though a few culturally Ukrainian villages remain.

== Inter-ethnic relations ==
Ukrainians in the Russian Federation represent the third-largest ethnic group after Russians and Tatars. In spite of their relatively high numbers, some Ukrainians in Russia reported unfair treatment and anti-Ukrainian sentiment in the Russian Federation. In November 2010, the High Court of Russia cancelled registration of one of the biggest civic communities of the Ukrainian minority, the "Federal nation-cultural autonomy of the Ukrainians in Russia" (FNCAUR).

A survey, conducted by the independent Russian research centre Levada in February 2019, found that 77% of Ukrainians and 82% of Russians think positively of each other as people.

== Demographics ==
=== Statistics and scholarship ===
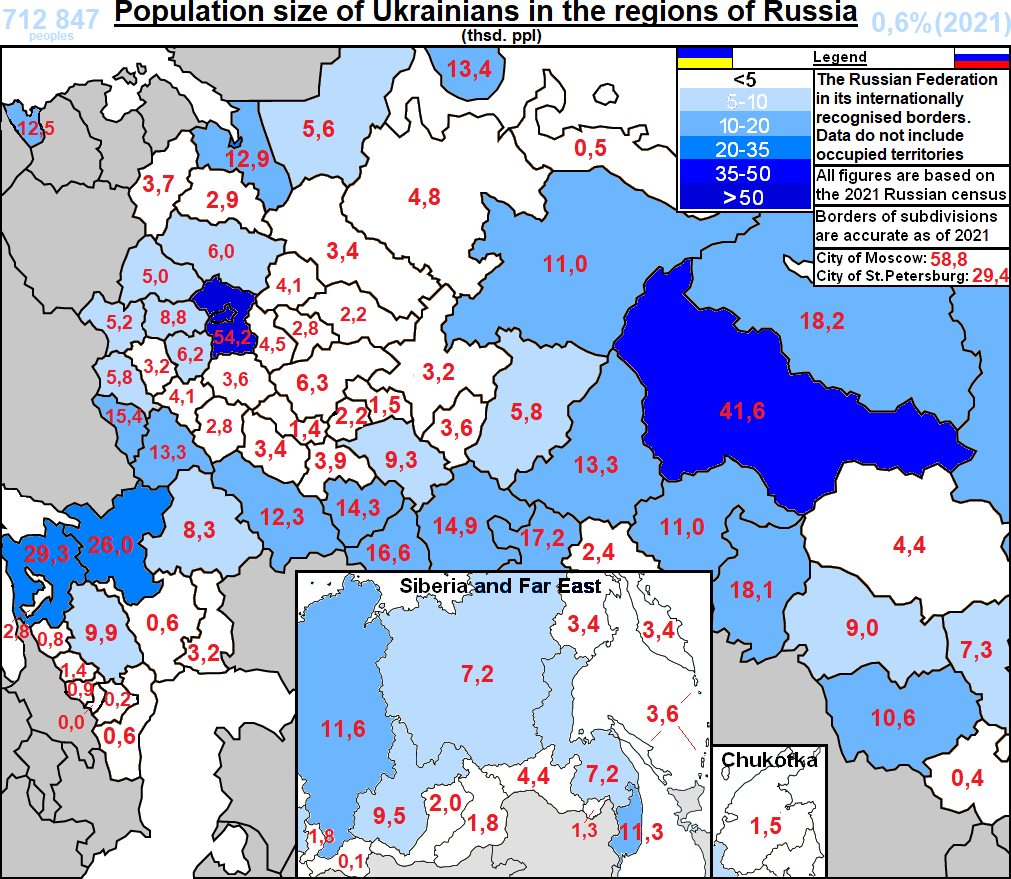
Population size of Ukrainians in regions of Russia (thsd. ppl.), 2021 census

Statistical information about Ukrainians is included in the census materials of the Russian Empire, the Soviet Union and the Russian Federation which were collected in 1897, 1920, 1923, 1926, 1937, 1939, 1959, 1970, 1979, 1989, 2002,2010 and 2021. Of these, the 1937 census was discarded and begun again as the 1939 census.

In the aftermath of the breakup of the Soviet Union in 1991, attention has been focused on the Eastern Ukrainian diaspora by the Society for relations with Ukrainians outside of Ukraine. Numerous attempts have been made to unite them. The society publishes the journal Zoloti Vorota (Золоті Ворота, named for The Golden Gate of Kyiv) and the magazine Ukrainian Diaspora.

No.	Census year	Population of Ukrainians in Russia	Percentage of total Russian population
1	1926	6,871,194	7.41
2	1939	3,359,184	3.07
3	1959	3,359,083	2.86
4	1970	3,345,885	2.57
5	1979	3,657,647	2.66
6	1989	4,362,872	2.97
7	2002	2,942,961	2.03
8	2010	1,927,988	1.40
9	2021	884,007	0.6

=== Religion ===
The vast majority of Ukrainians in Russia are adherents of the Russian Orthodox Church. The Ukrainian clergy had an influential role on Russian Orthodoxy in the 17th and 18th centuries.

Recently, the growing economic migrant population from Galicia have had success in establishing a few Ukrainian Catholic churches, and there are several churches belonging to the Ukrainian Orthodox Church (Kyiv Patriarchate), where Patriarch Filaret agreed to accept breakaway groups that had been excommunicated by the Russian Orthodox Church for breaches of canon law. In 2002, some asserted that Russian bureaucracy imposed on religion has hampered the expansion of these two groups. According to the Ukrainian Greek Catholic Church, their denomination has only one church building in all of Russia.

=== Trends ===
During the 1990s, the Ukrainian population in Russia noticeably decreased due to a number of factors. The most important one was the general population decline in Russia. At the same time, many economic migrants from Ukraine moved to Russia for better paid jobs and careers. It is estimated that there are as many as 300,000 legally registered migrants. There is negative sentiment toward the bulk of migrants from the Caucasus and Central Asia, with Ukrainians relatively trusted by the Russian population. Assimilation has also been a factor in the falling number of Ukrainians; many intermarry with Russians, due to cultural similarities, and their children are counted as Russian on the census. Otherwise, the Ukrainian population has mostly remained stable due to immigration from Ukraine.

== Notable Ukrainians in Russia ==
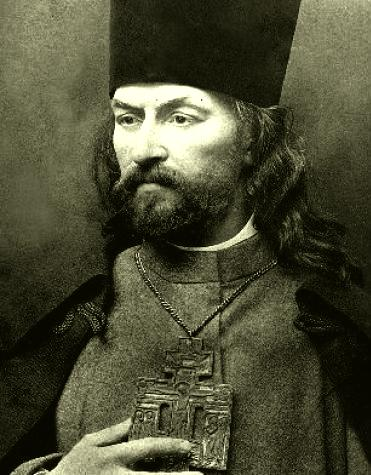
Georgy Gapon

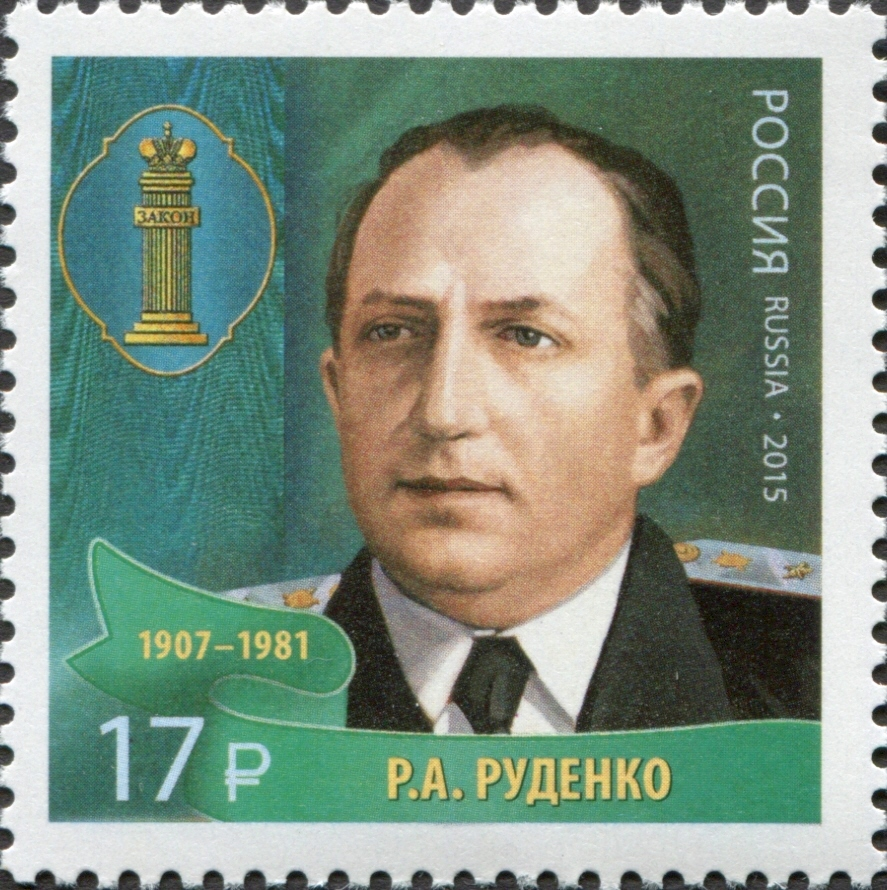
Roman Rudenko

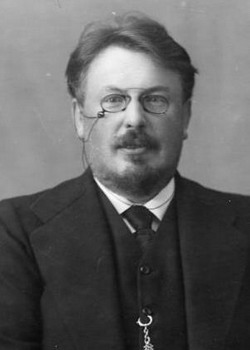
Anatoly Savenko

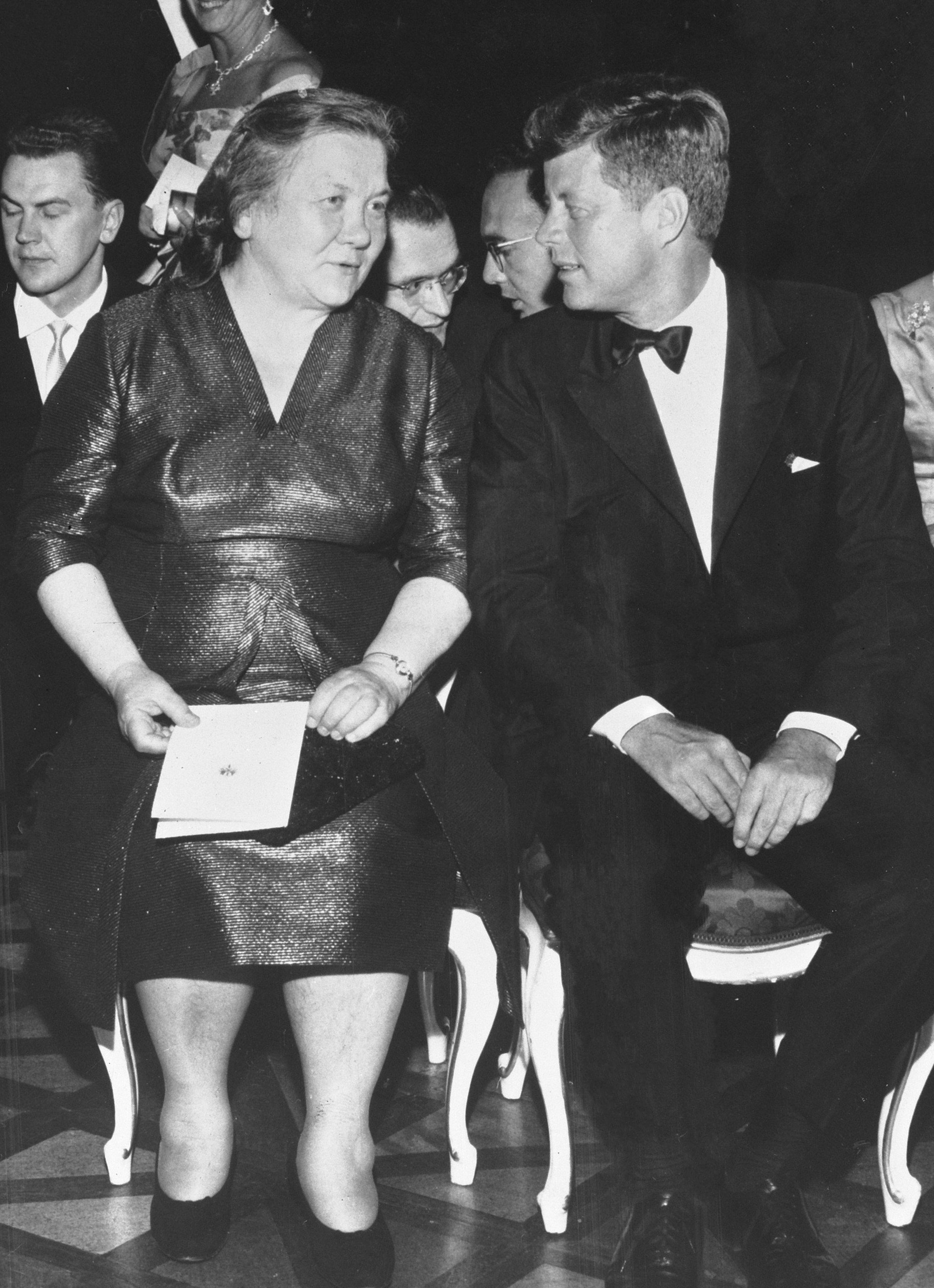
Nina Kukharchuk-Khrushcheva

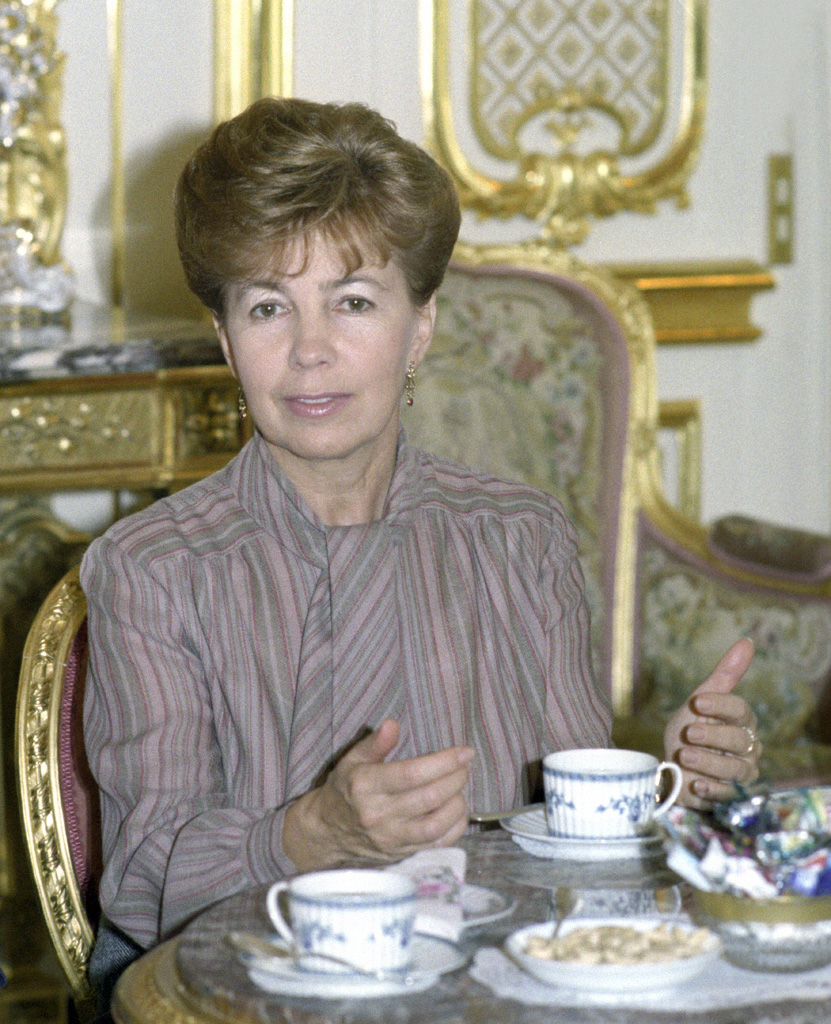
Raisa Titarenko

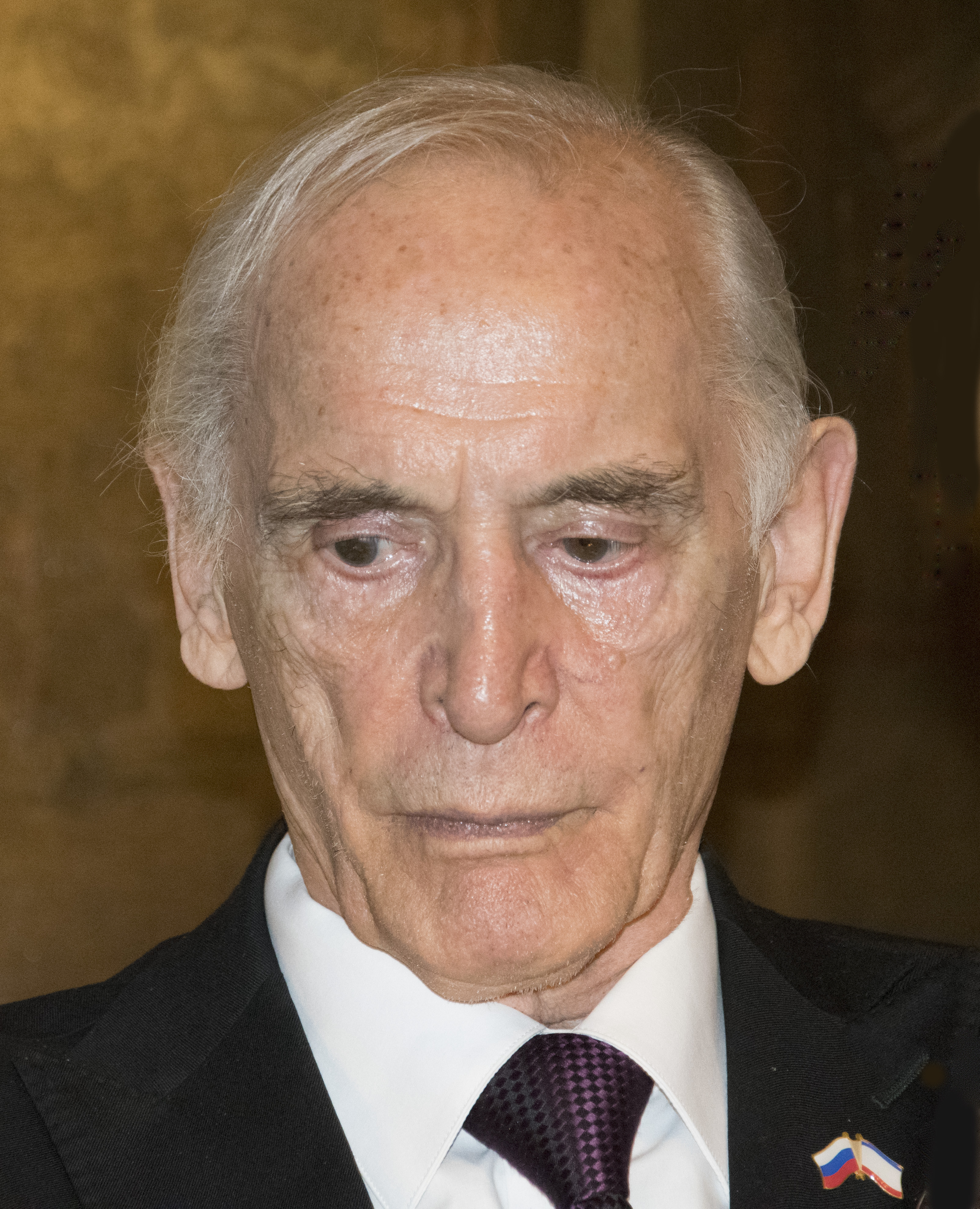
Vasily Lanovoy

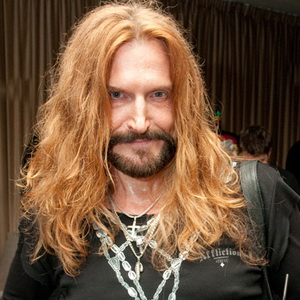
Nikita Dzhigurda

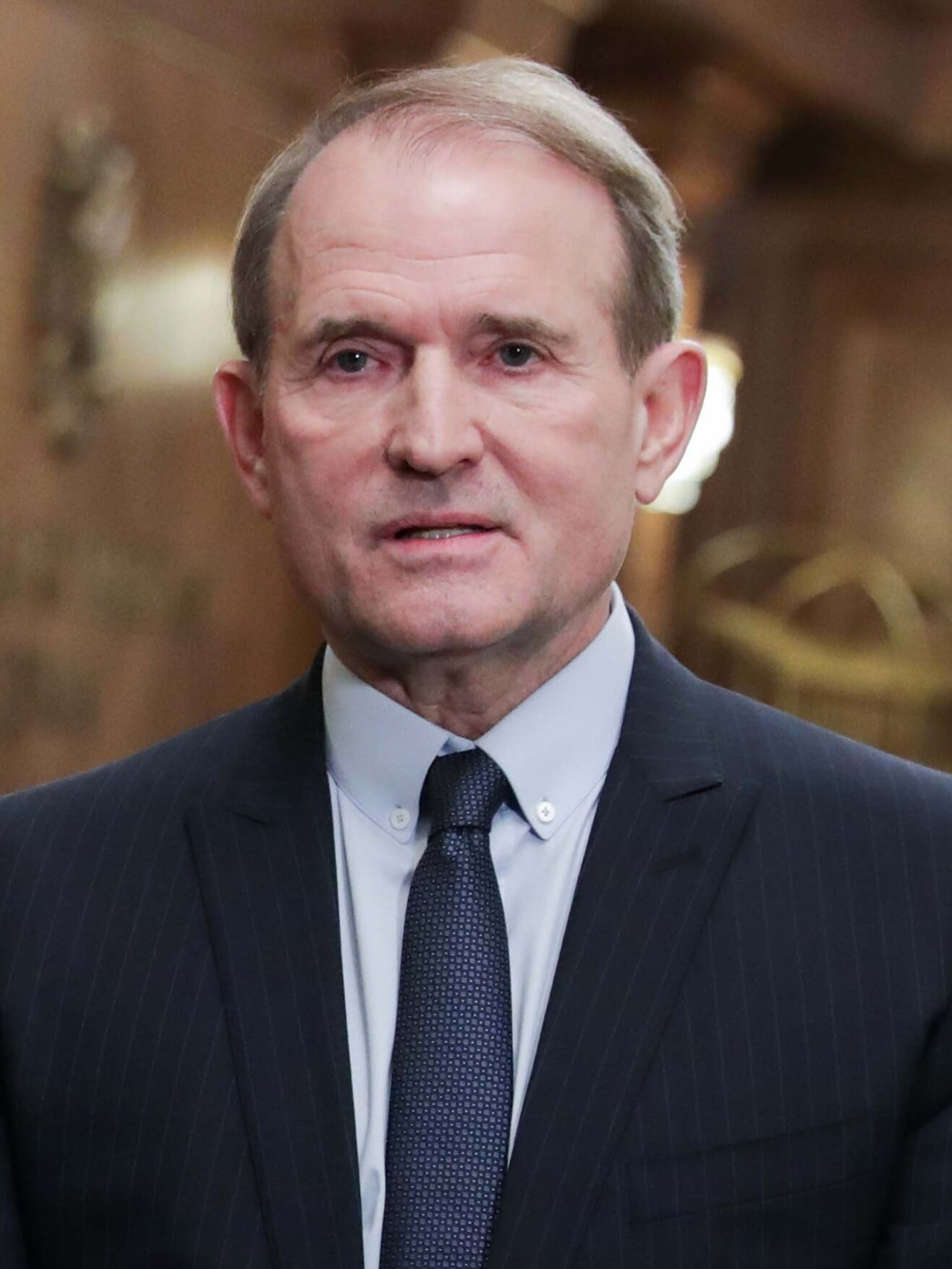
Viktor Medvedchuk

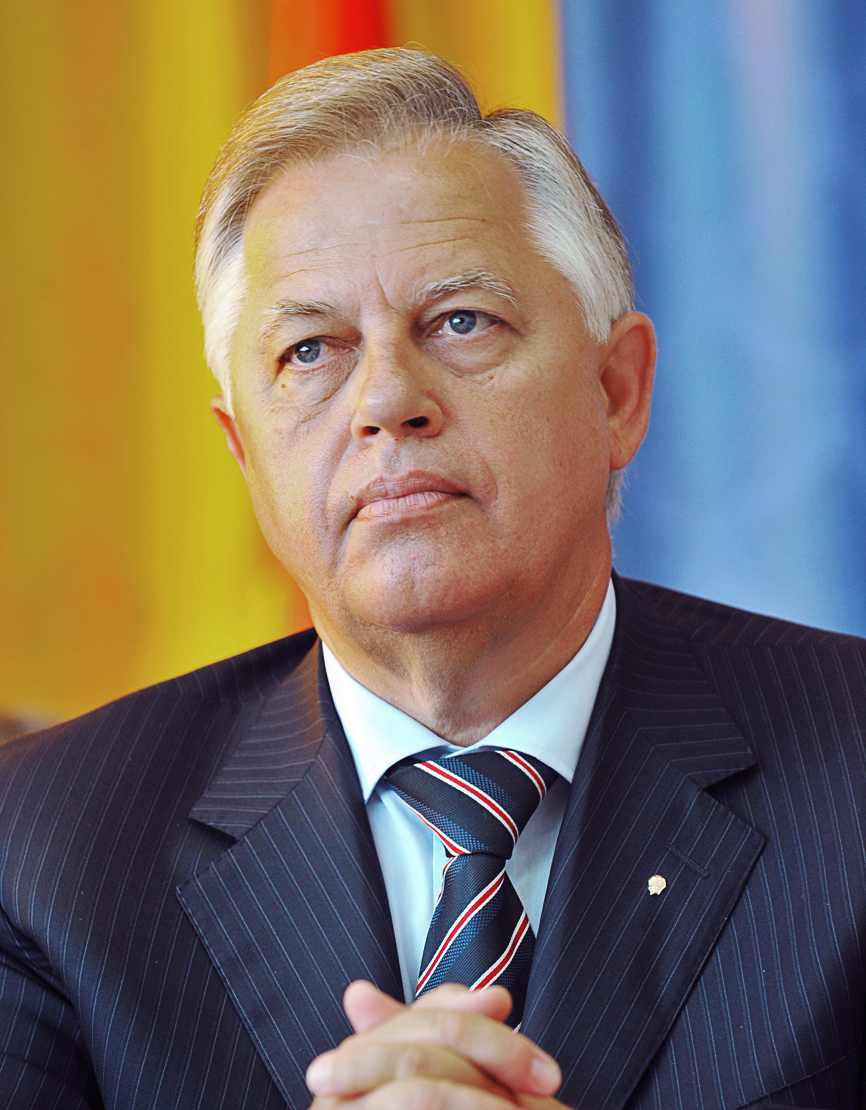
Petro Symonenko

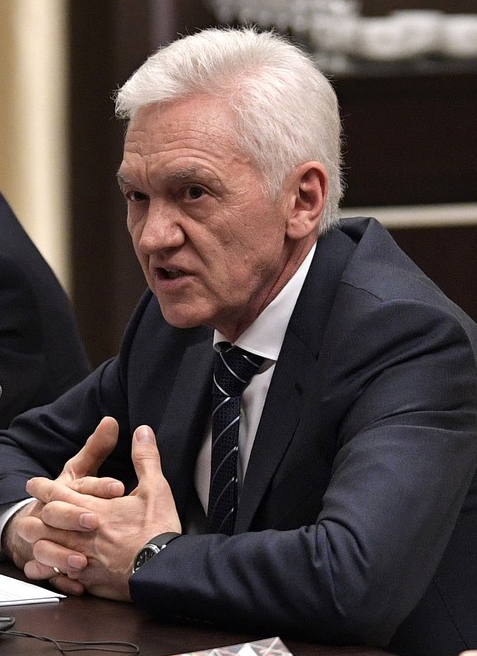
Gennady Timchenko

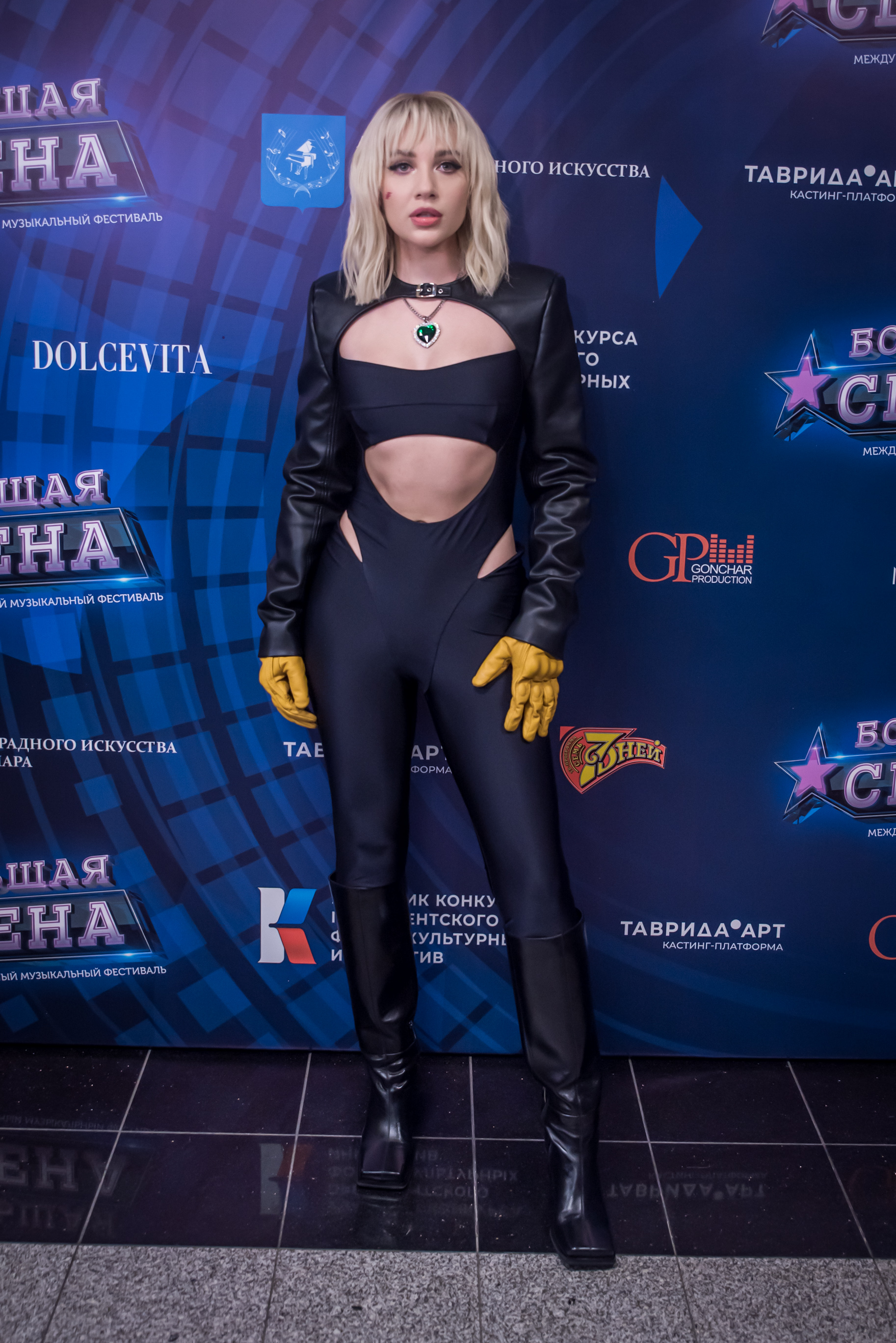
Maria Boyko

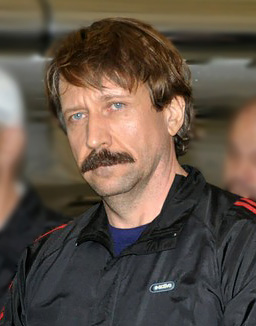
Viktor Bout

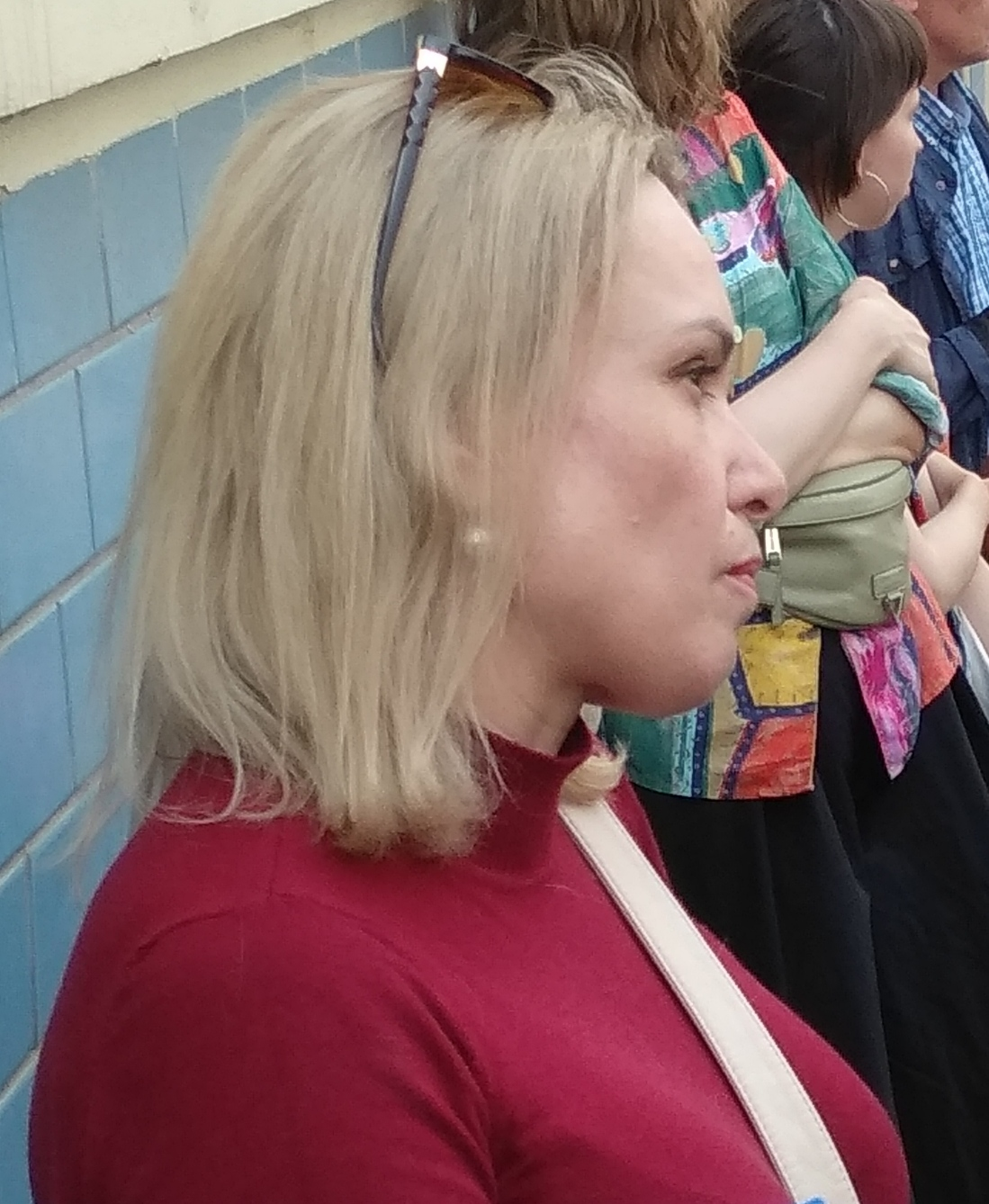
Marina Ovsyannikova (Tkachuk)

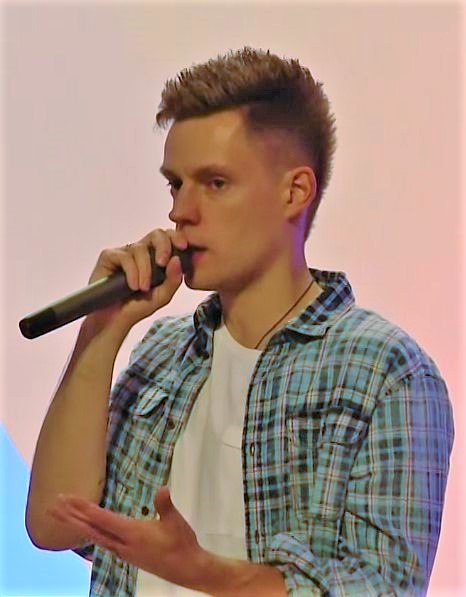
Yury Dud

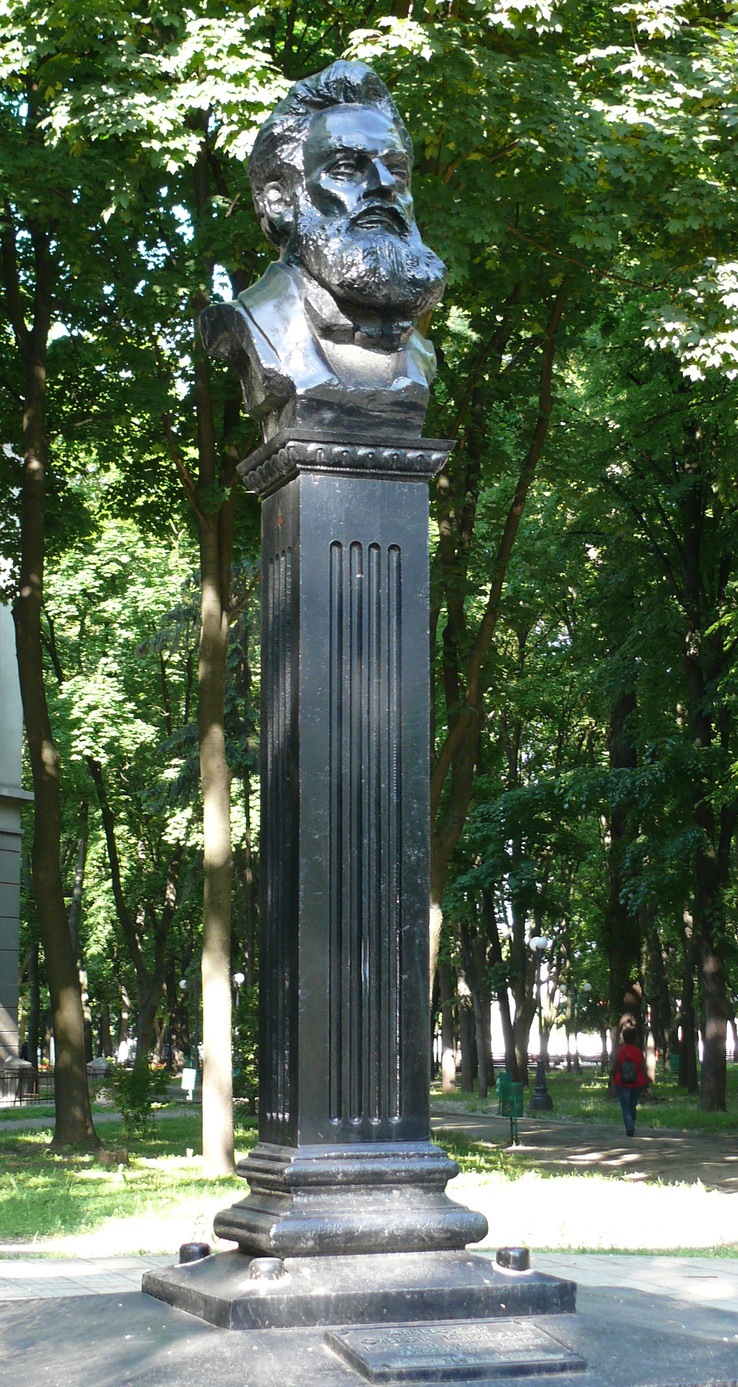
Aleksey Alchevsky

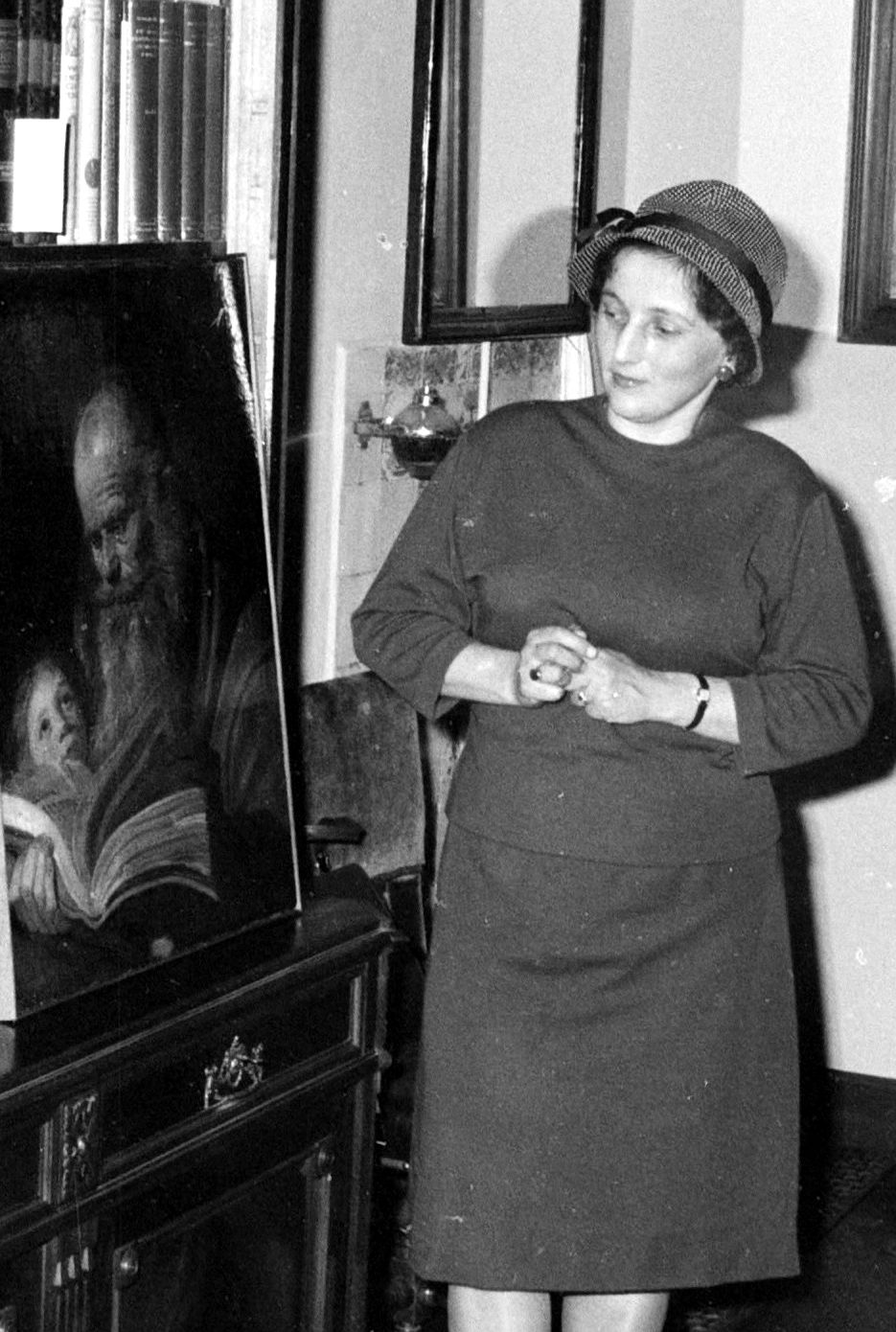
Irina Linnik

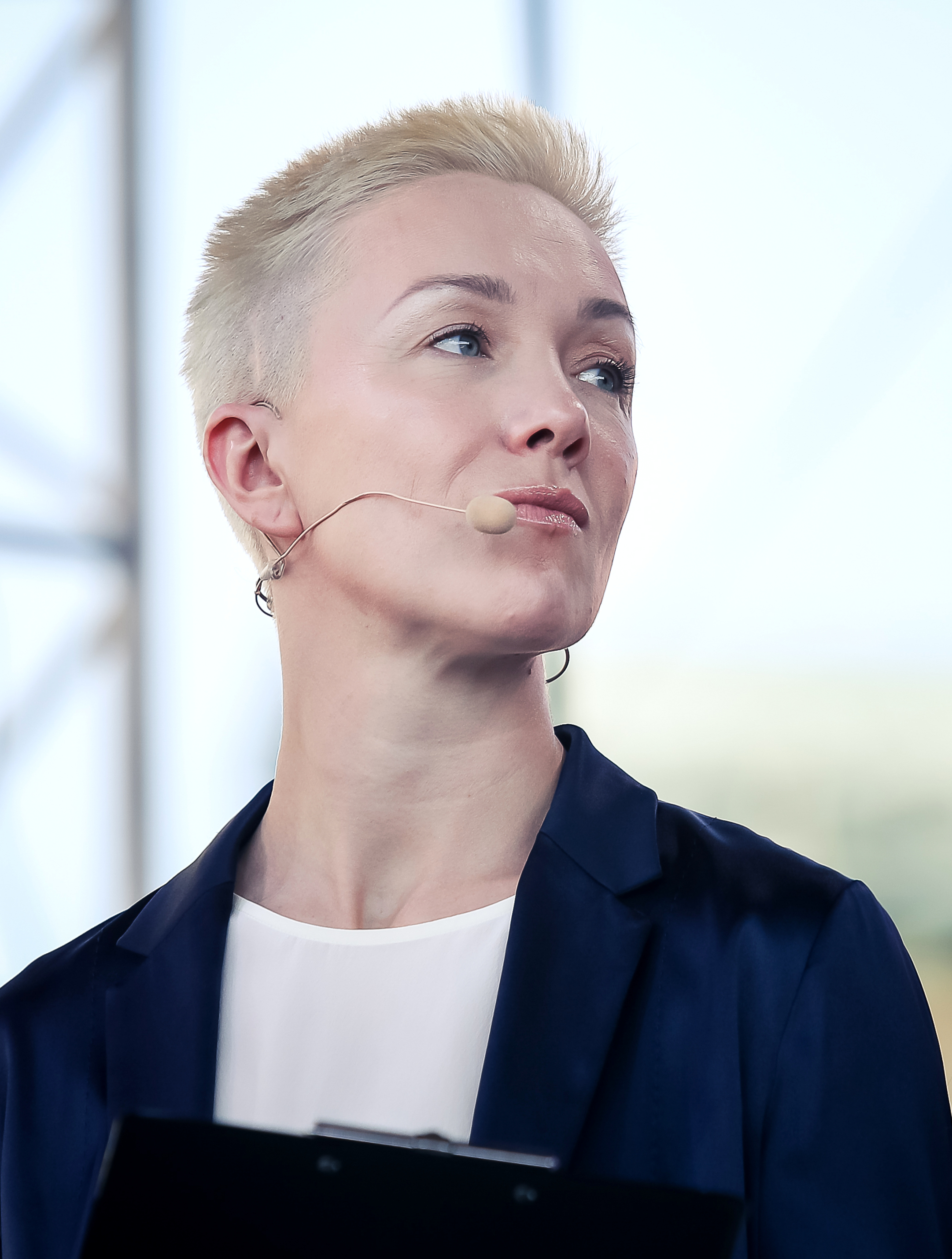
Darya Moroz

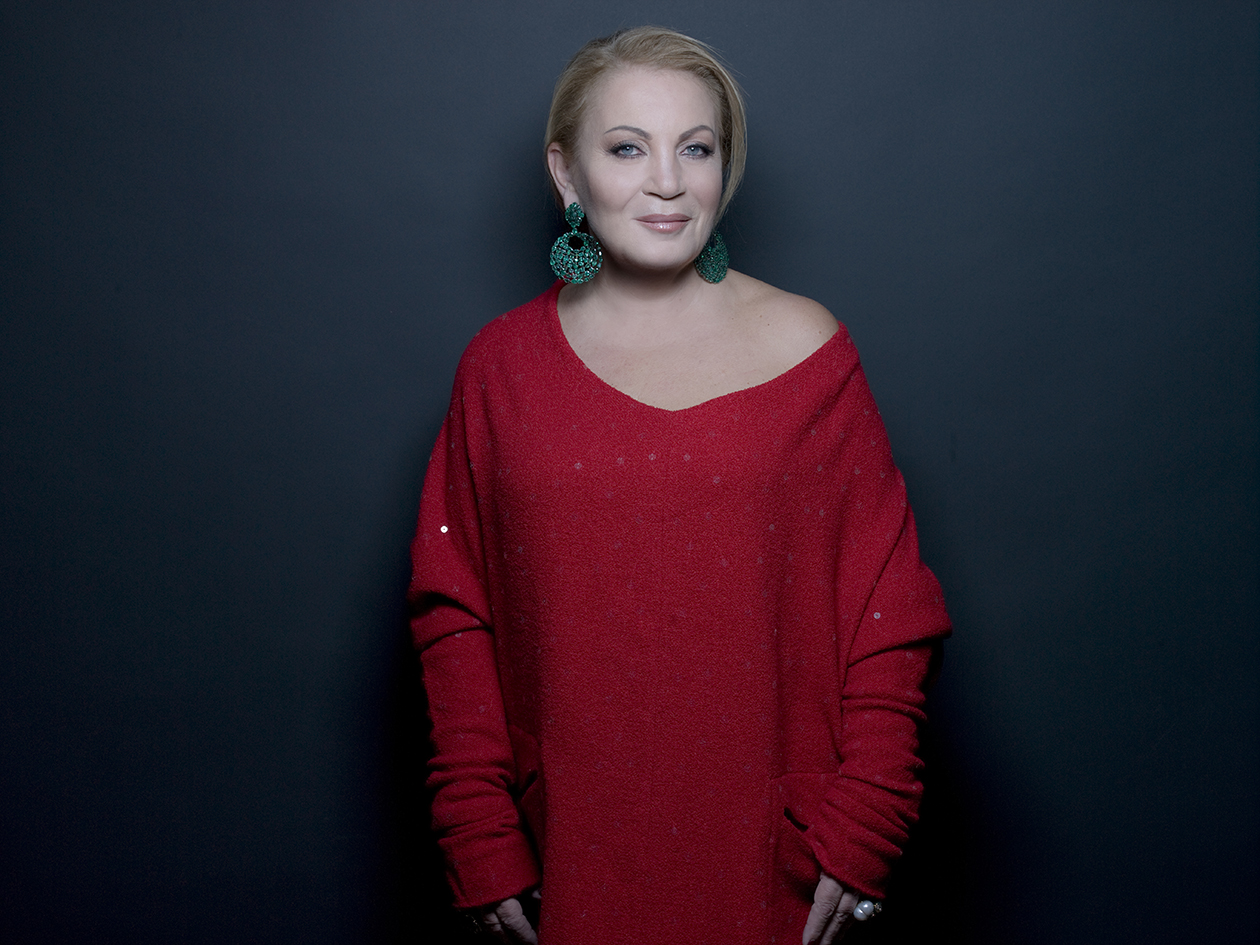
Helen Yarmak

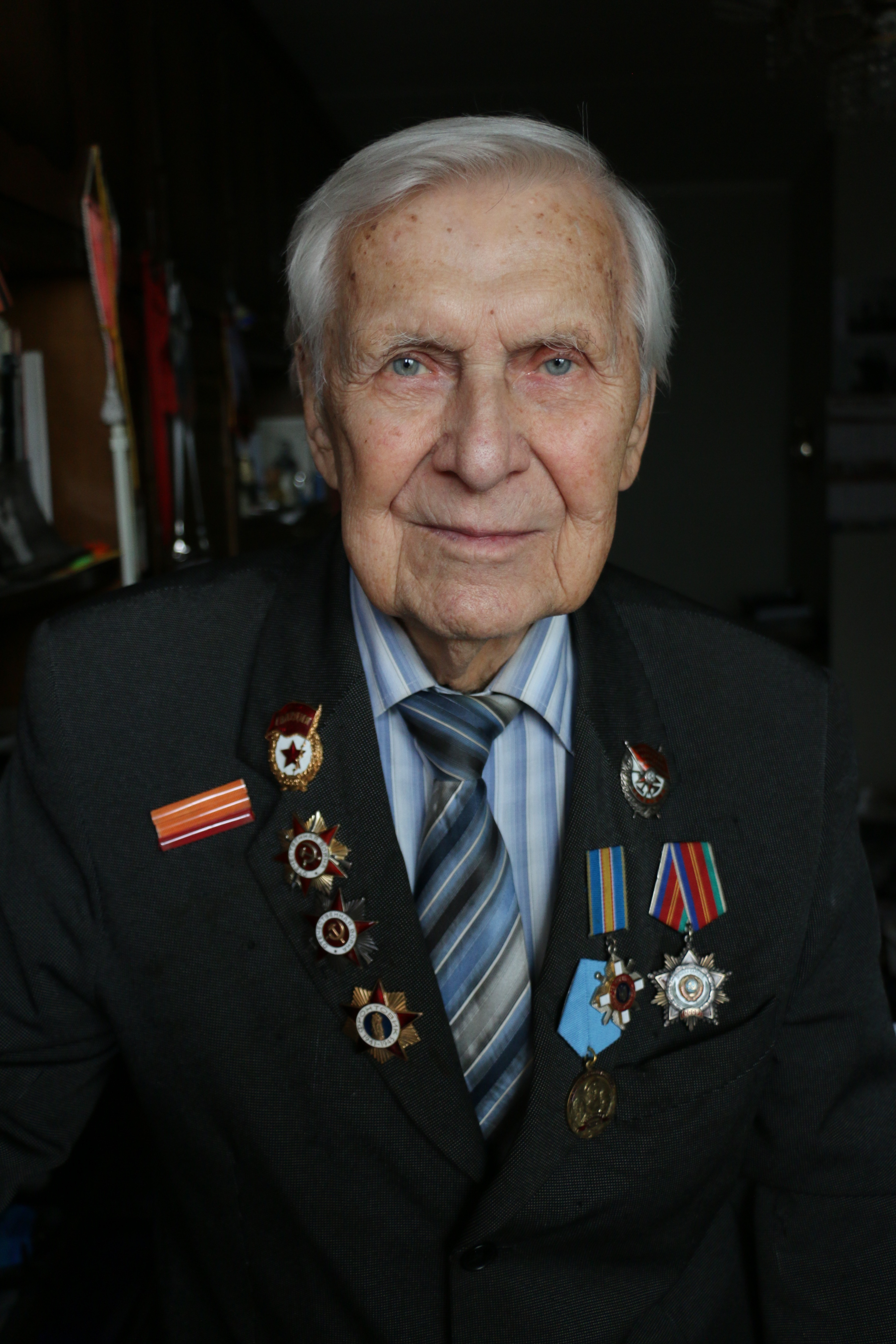
Nikolay Dupak

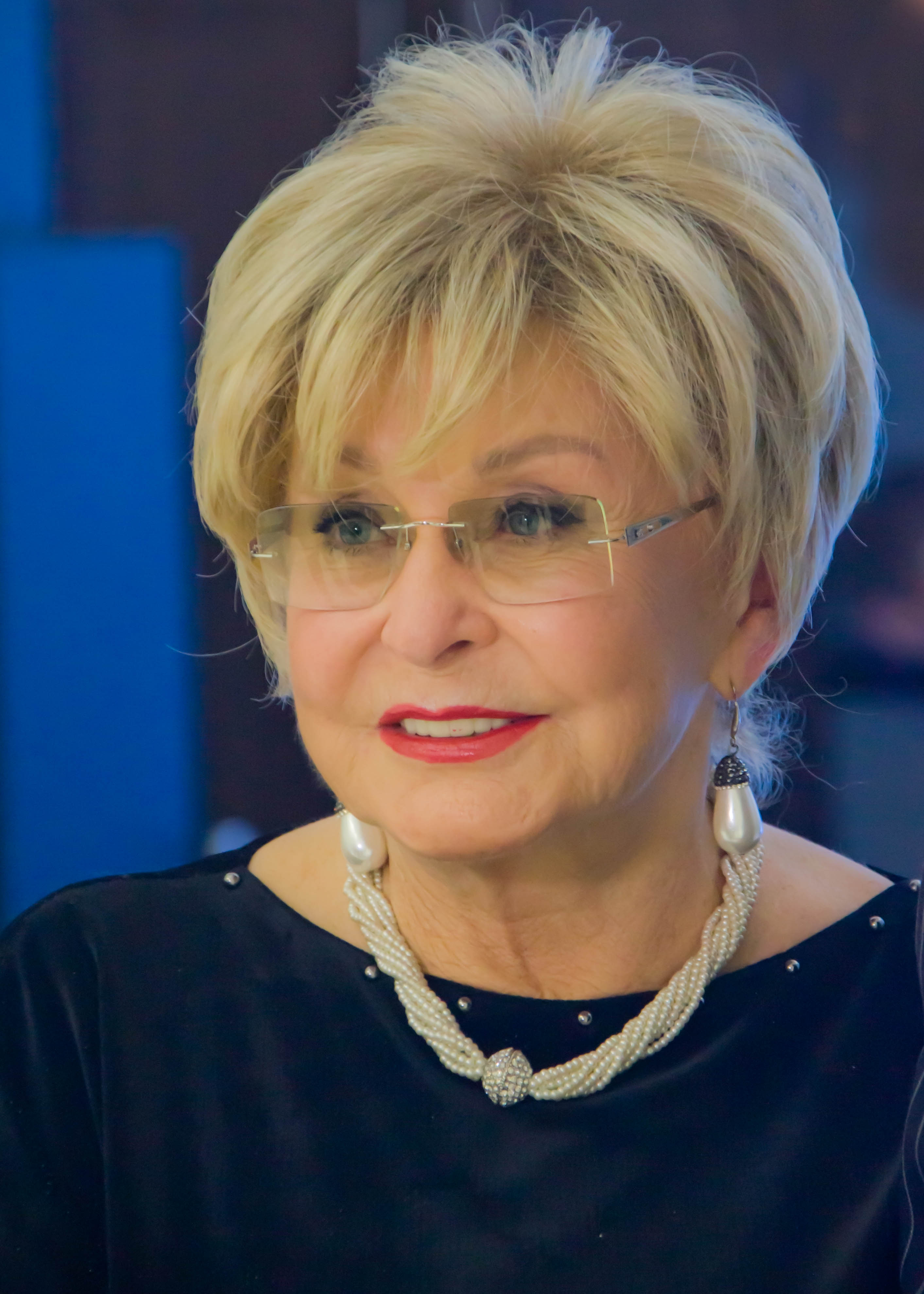
Angelina Vovk

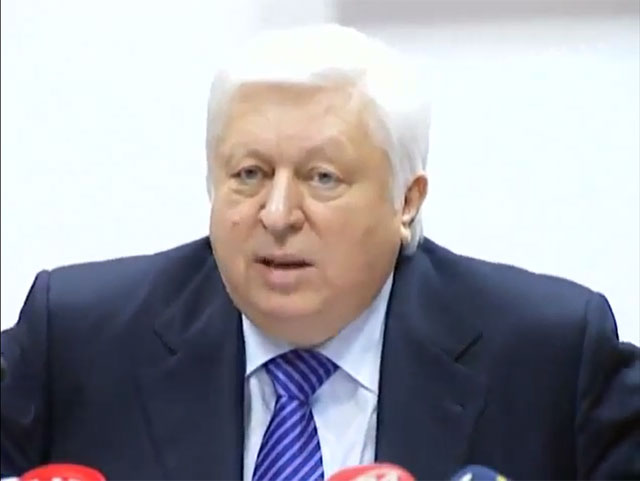
Viktor Pshonka

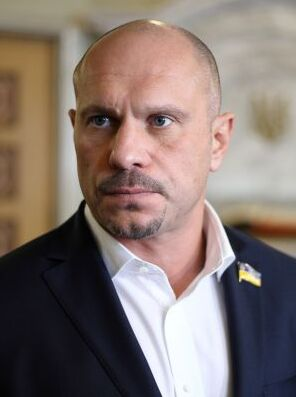
Illia Kyva

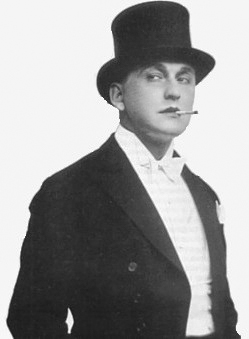
Alexander Vertinsky

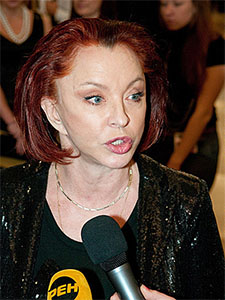
Anastasiya Vertinskaya

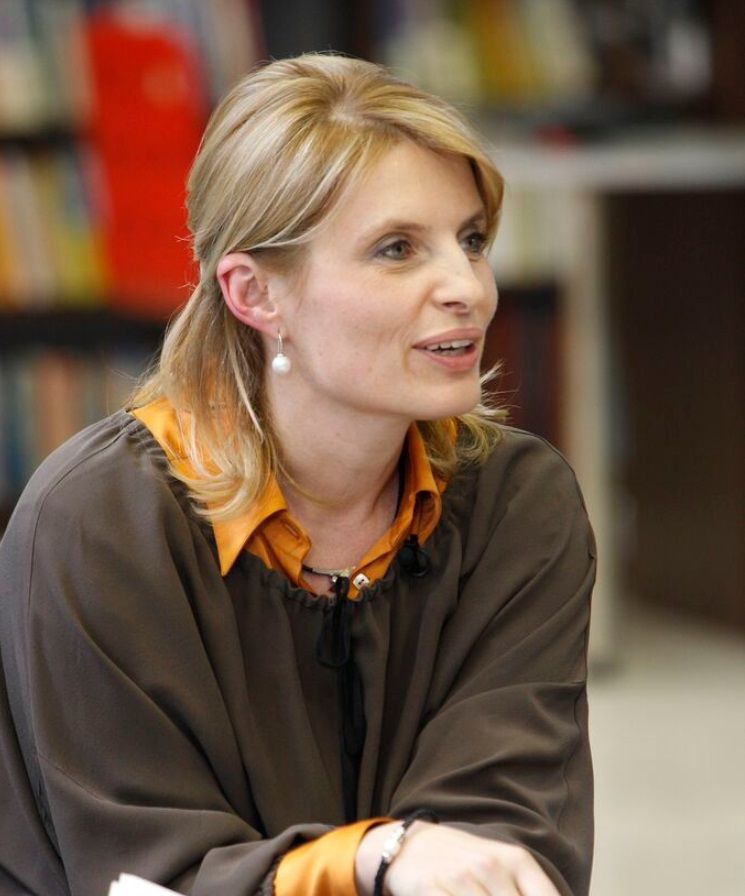
Svetlana Mironyuk

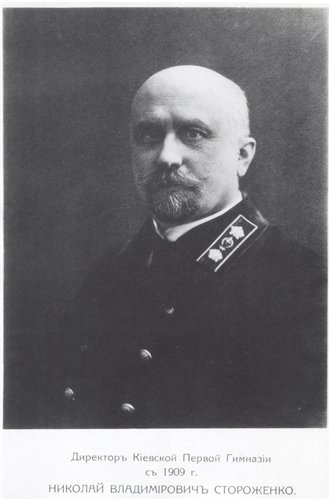
Nikolay V. Storozhenko

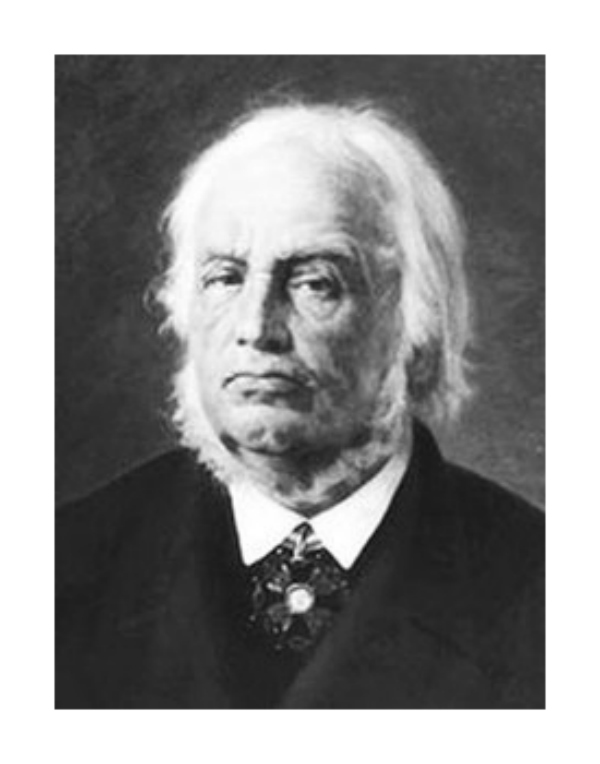
Artemy Tereshchenko

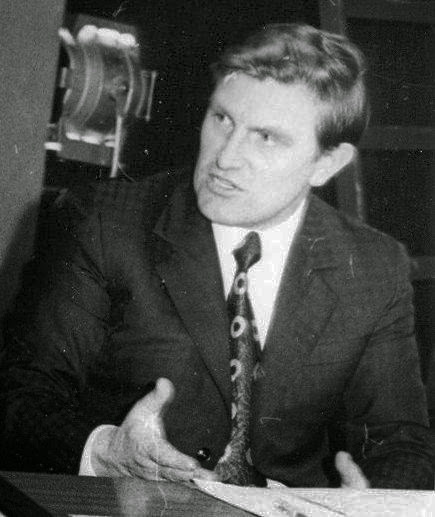
Stanislav Meleiko

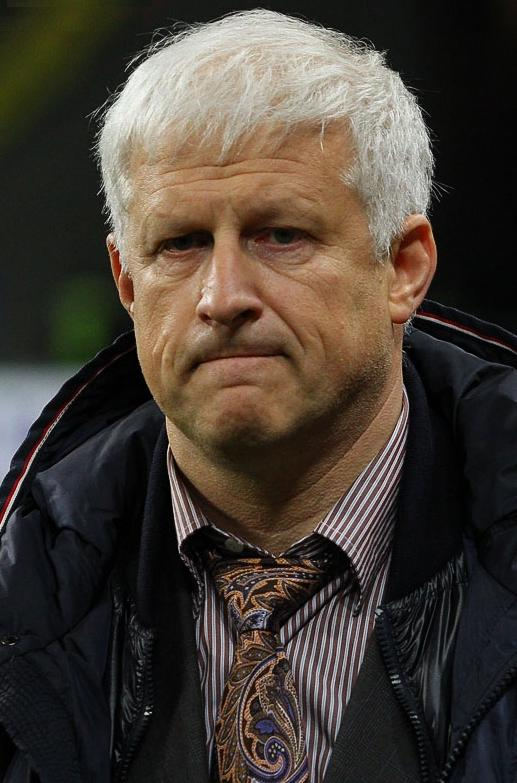
Sergey Fursenko

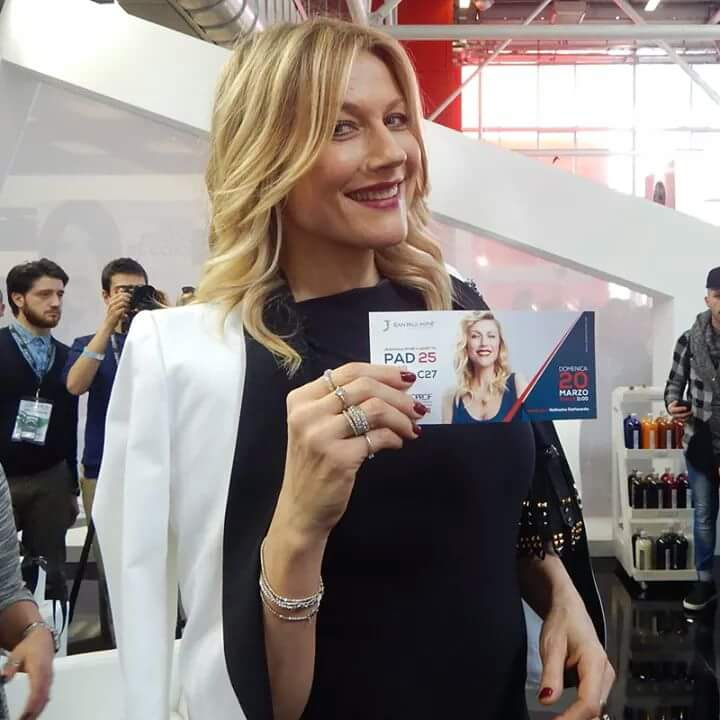
Natasha Stefanenko

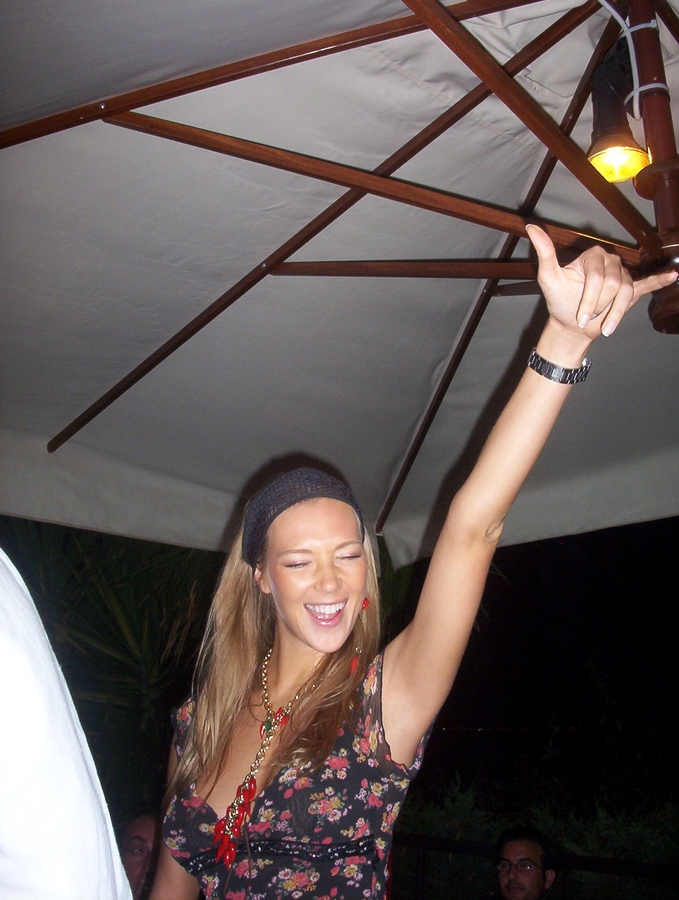
Ludmilla Radchenko

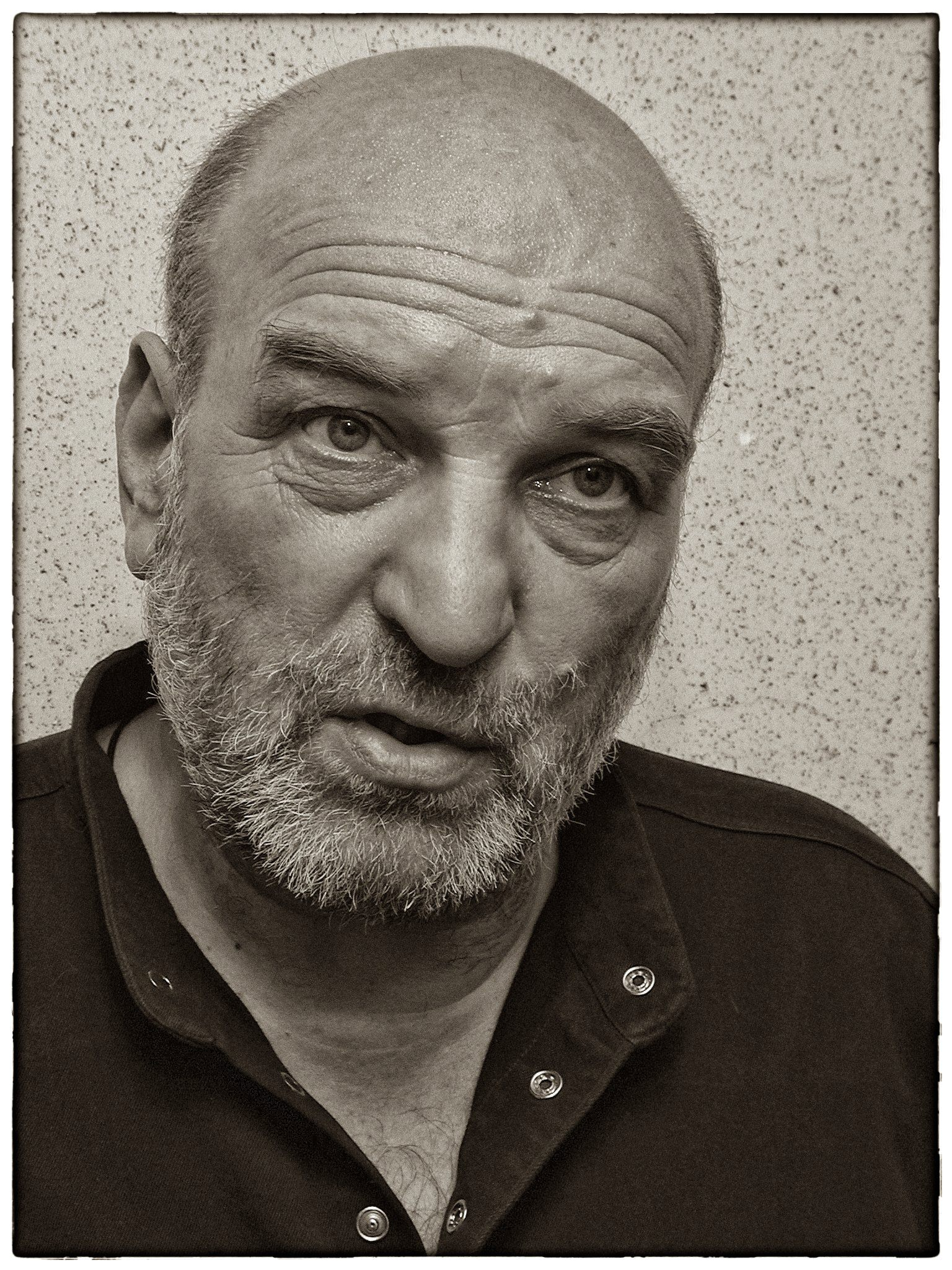
Aleksei Petrenko

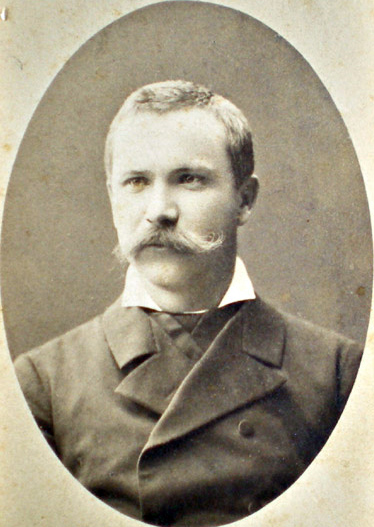
Ivan Karpenko-Karyi

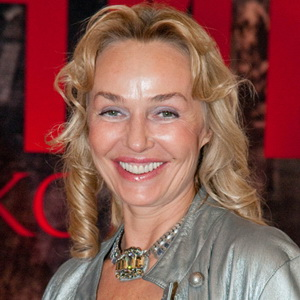
Natalya Andreychenko

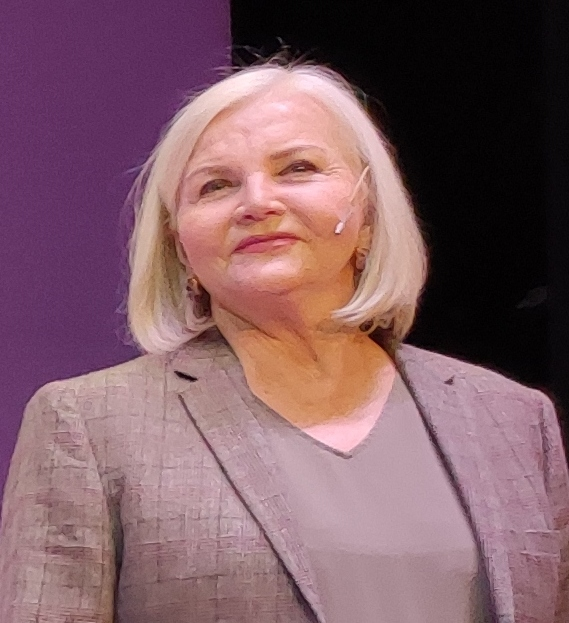
Olga Naumenko

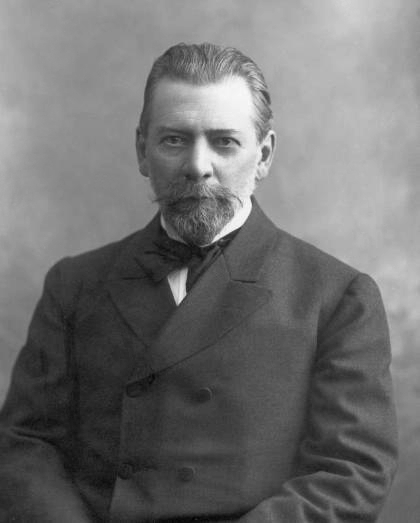
Bogdan Khanenko

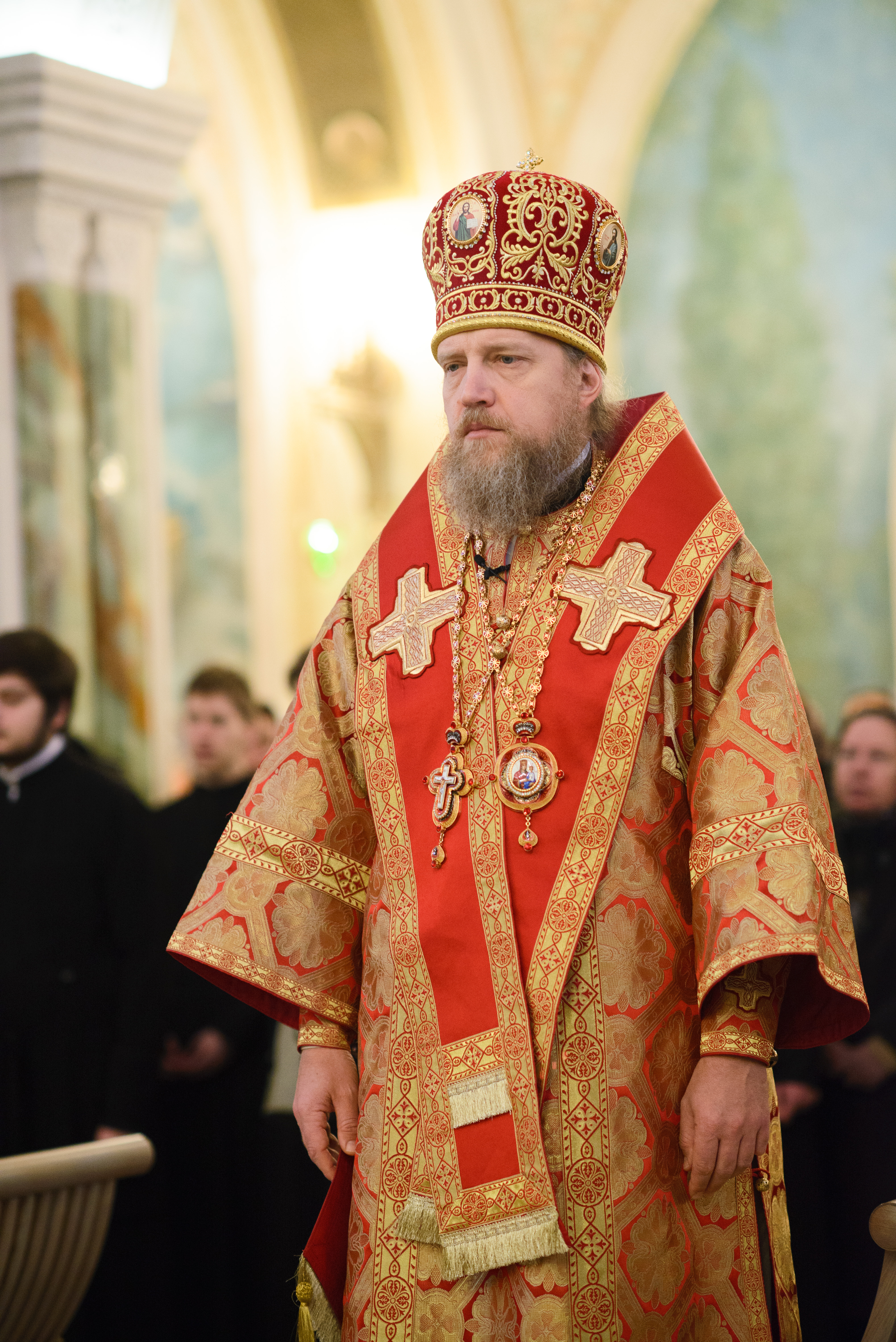
John Rudenko

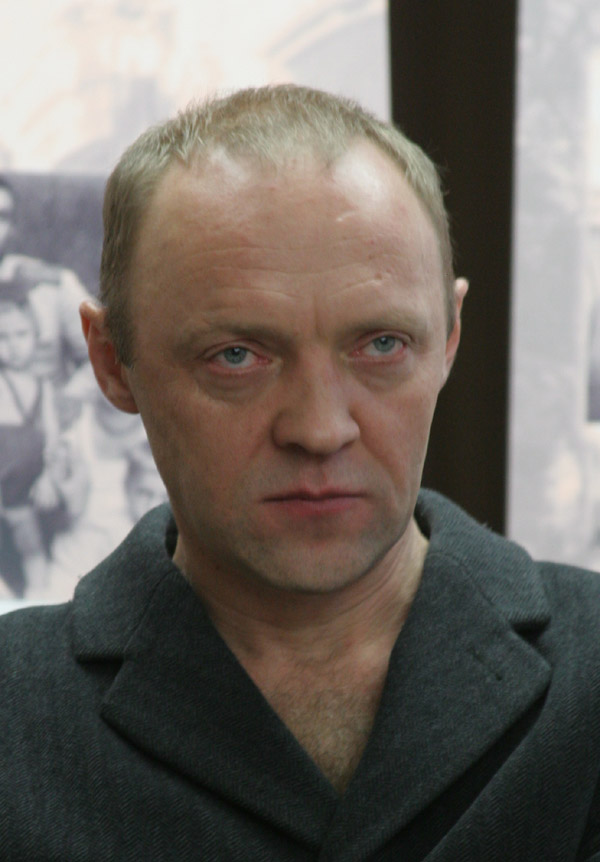
Vitali Kishchenko

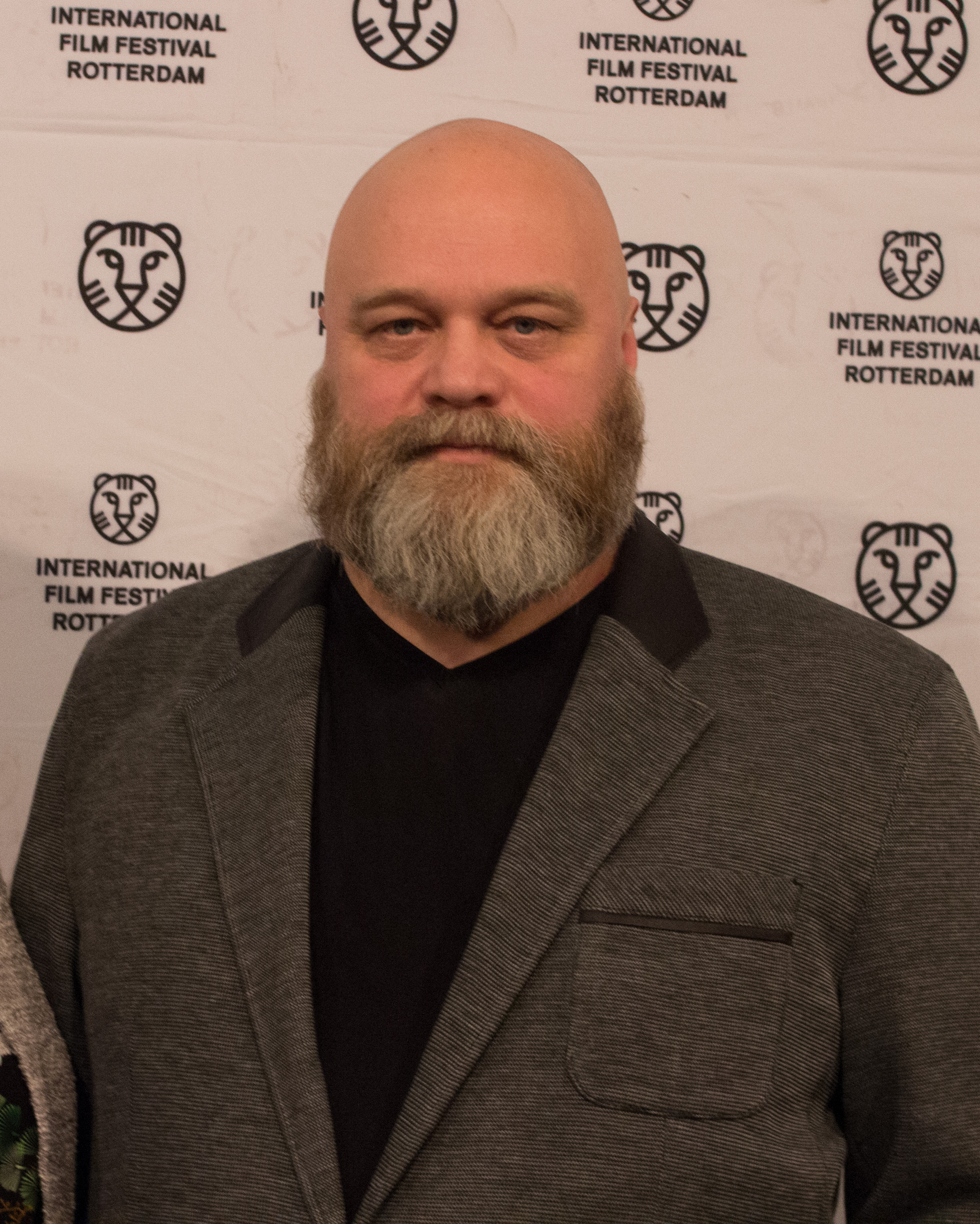
Aleksey Fedorchenko

- Arsenius (Matseyevich) – metropolitan of Rostov and Yaroslavl who protested against the confiscation of the church's land by Empress Catherine II in 1764
- Dimitry of Rostov – leading opponent of the Caesaropapist reform of the Russian Orthodox church promoted by Feofan Prokopovich.
- Dositheus (Ivanchenko) – bishop of the Russian Orthodox Church
- Innocent of Irkutsk – missionary to Siberia and the first bishop of Irkutsk in Russia
- Joasaph of Belgorod – Russian Orthodox hierarch, bishop of Belgorod from 1748 until his death
- John of Tobolsk – Metropolitan of Tobolsk
- Vasily the Barefoot (Vasily Filippovich Tkachenko) (1856–1933) – Russian wanderer
- Oleksiy Alchevsky – entrepreneur, philanthropist, and industrialist of the Russian Empire. He was a pioneer in establishing the first finance group in Russia
- Natalya Andreychenko – Soviet actress
- Yelena Andrienko – soloist of Bolshoi Ballet, Honoured Artist of Russia
- Nikolay Andrushchenko – journalist
- Irina Antonenko – actress and model, and beauty pageant titleholder who was crowned Miss Russia 2010
- Oksana Antonenko – economist
- Maxim Antonovich – literary critic, essayist, memoirist, translator and philosopher
- Anton Antonov-Ovseenko – writer and historian
- Semyon Babayevsky – writer
- Arkady Babchenko – print and television journalist
- Ihor Bakai – former Ukrainian statesman, and politician, Director of the Naftogaz (1998–2000). Afraid of criminal charges against him, fled Ukraine to Russia following the Orange Revolution, where in 2005 he received citizenship
- Natalia Bardo (Krivozub) – actress, singer and a TV host
- Rouslan Bodelan – Ukrainian politician, granted Russian citizenship in 2006 and a position of deputy director of the Saint Petersburg Sea Port
- Nikolay Bondar – jurist and constitutional law scholar who served as the judge of the Constitutional Court of Russia from 2000 to 2020
- Yelena Bondarchuk (half Ukrainian) – Soviet actress
- Nadezhda Bondarenko – Transnistrian politician, acting chairperson of the Transnistrian Communist Party (PKP) since late 2018, born in Ivanovo
- Alexander Borodai – journalist and entrepreneur, former separatist leader who was Prime Minister of the self-proclaimed Donetsk People's Republic in 2014
- Pyotr Borovsky – surgeon
- Viktor Bout – arms dealer
- Oleg Boyko – international investor and resides in Switzerland, Chairman of Finstar Financial Group
- Yaroslav Boyko – actor of theatre and cinema
- Maria Boyko - singer, influencer, TV presenter and film actress
- Volodymyr Chekhivskyi – member of the Russian Constituent Assembly (18 January 1918 – 19 January 1918)
- Elena Chernenko – journalist
- Allan Chumak – faith healer who came to prominence at the height of Gorbachev's Perestroika
- Igor Danchenko, Russian analyst in the United States
- Alla Danko – TV presenter, journalist, and former announcer of Soviet Central Television
- Aleksandr Dedyushko – television actor, best known for war dramas and the Russian version of Dancing with the Stars
- Aleksandr Demyanenko – film and theater actor
- Vladimir Derevenko – Russian Imperial and Soviet medical doctor and surgeon who served at the court of Emperor Nicholas II of Russia
- Pavel Derevyanko – theatre and film actor
- Semyon Desnitsky – legal scholar
- Kateryna Desnytska – Ukrainian-born nurse, became a princess as wife of the Siamese prince Chakrabongse Bhuvanath, participant in the Russo-Japanese War and was awarded the Cross of St. George (1904)
- Alexei Devotchenko – actor and activist
- Yury Dud – sports journalist and YouTuber, was editor-in-chief of Sports.ru
- Nikolay Dupak – Soviet theater and film actor, theatre director, the head of theatres
- Alexander Dyachenko – actor, record producer and musician
- Dmitriy Dyachenko – director, producer and screenwriter
- Nikita Dzhigurda – movie actor, singer, and cult media icon
- Tikhon Dzyadko – journalist, television presenter and media manager, editor-in-chief of the TV Rain channel, former deputy editor-in-chief and host of the RTVI TV network.
- Alexey Eybozhenko – Soviet film and theater actor
- Anastasia Fedko – actress
- Aleksey Fedorchenko – film director
- Igor Fesunenko – Soviet and Russian journalist, foreign affairs writer, and teacher at the MGIMO
- Sergey Fursenko – businessman
- Georgy Gapon – Russian Orthodox priest and a popular working-class leader before the 1905 Russian Revolution
- Sergei Garmash – Soviet and Russian film and stage actor, People's Artist of Russia
- Viktor Gayevski – literary critic and historian
- Dmitry Gerasimenko – businessman, ex-owner of steel company Krasny Oktyabr Closed Joint-Stock Company and of basketball clubs BC Krasny Oktyabr and Pallacanestro Cantù.
- Yevgeniya Glushenko – actress
- Aleksandr Goloborodko – actor
- Alexey Goloborodko – contortionist
- Raisa Titarenko-Gorbacheva – First Lady of USSR, wife of Soviet leader Mikhail Gorbachev
- Tatiana Grindenko – violinist
- Elena Grinenko – professional ballroom dance champion, choreographer, and instructor
- Viktor Ivanenko (security officer) - Chairman of the KGB of RSFSR and Director-General of the Federal Security Agency of RSFSR from 1991 to 1992
- Vladimir Ivanenko – founder of the first nongovernmental cable and essential television network in the USSR (1988); initiator and organizer of the first direct satellite broadcast from the territory of the former USSR (1994)
- Saint John of Shanghai and San Francisco – prominent Eastern Orthodox ascetic and hierarch of the Russian Orthodox Church Outside Russia (ROCOR) who was active in the mid-20th century
- Ivan Karpenko-Karyi – writer, playwright, actor, and erudite
- Miroslava Karpovich – actress and model
- Varvara Khanenko (née Tereshchenko, 1848–1922) – noted art collector alongside her husband Bogdan Khanenko
- Nikolay Khlibko – actor
- Vera Kholodnaya – star of Russian silent cinema
- Artur Kirilenko – entrepreneur, between 1994 and 2010 was owner and director of Stroymontazh, one of the largest property development companies in St Petersburg, Russia; Honorary Builder of Russia
- Vladimir Kiriyenko – business executive
- Zinaida Kiriyenko – actress and singer
- Vitali Kishchenko – Soviet actor
- German Klimenko – entrepreneur and owner of LiveInternet
- Alexander Klimenko – former Ukrainian entrepreneur and politician, former minister of revenue and duties of Ukraine
- Serhiy Komisarenko – diplomat
- Maxim Kononenko – journalist, writer and TV show host
- Nelly Korniyenko – Soviet actress
- Alexey Korolyuk – Soviet sculptor and medallist, and the first president of the Leningrad medal club
- Mikhail Kosenko – activist
- Victor Kostetskiy – Russian and Soviet actor
- Elena Kostyuchenko – journalist and activist
- Anna Kovalchuk – actress
- Yury Kovalchuk – billionaire businessman and financier "reputed to be Vladimir Putin's personal banker"
- Irina Kovalenko – model, won "Miss Murmansk" and "The Beauty of Russia" titles in 2001
- Ivan Koval-Samborsky – stage and film actor
- Nathalie Kovanko – film actress of the silent era
- Evgeny Kozubsky – scholar, educator, and public official, served as secretary of the Dagestan Regional Statistical Committee (1899–1911)
- Andrey Krasko – theatre and cinema actor
- Ivan I. Krasko – film and theater actor
- Julia Krasko – violinist
- Olga Krasko – Russian actress
- Vyacheslav Krasko – traveler, manager and financier
- Alex Kravchenko – professional poker player
- Galina Kravchenko – actress
- Victor Kravchenko – Soviet defector
- Sergei Kukharenko – political and public activist
- Nadezhda Kurchenko – Soviet flight attendant involved in the hijacking of Aeroflot Flight 244
- Grigory Kushelev-Bezborodko – writer, publisher and philanthropist
- Nikolai Alexandrovich Kushelev-Bezborodko – art collector
- Yuriy Kutsenko – actor, producer, singer, poet, and screenwriter
- Illia Kyva – Ukrainian politician, effectively defected to Russia by asking Russian president Vladimir Putin for a Russian passport (Russian citizenship) and political asylum
- Vasily Lanovoy, actor who worked in the Vakhtangov Theatre, was also known as the President of Artek Festival of Films for Children
- Anton Lapenko – film and theater actor
- Anna Lavrinenko – writer
- Konstantin Lavronenko – Soviet actor
- Maxim Shevchenko – editor, journalist and presenter on television and radio, one of the leading Russian journalists and experts on ethno-cultural and religious policies
- Marina Lesko – journalist, author, and cultural commentator
- Stanislav Levchenko (born 1941) – Russian KGB major and defector to the United States
- Ruslan Karpuk (Leviev) – opposition activist, military analyst and founder of the investigative group Conflict Intelligence Team
- Natalya Lisenko – silent film actress
- Vlad Lisovets – stylist, hair stylist, designer and host
- Sergey Loiko – writer, war photographer, and journalist
- Klara Luchko – Soviet actress
- Anatoly Lysenko – television figure, journalist, director, producer
- Vladimir Lysenko – academic and traveller
- Sergei Magnitsky – Ukrainian-born Russian lawyer and tax advisor
- Sergey Makovetsky – film and stage actor
- Aleksey Malashenko – academic and political scientist, specialized in the oriental and Islamic studies
- Vera Malinovskaya – silent film actress
- Lyudmila Marchenko – actress
- Georgy Martyniuk (1940–2014) – Russian actor
- Leonid Martynyuk (born 1978) – Russian opposition journalist
- Lev Medved – professor of the USSR Academy of Medical Sciences
- Viktor Medvedchuk – Ukrainian opposition politician. Born in Pochet, Krasnoyarsk Krai, Russian SFSR.Vladimir Putin is the godfather of Medvedchuk's daughter Daryna (born in 2004).Live in Russia since September 2022.
- Stanislav Meleiko – journalist, TV presenter, director, and producer of his own programs
- Sergej Mironović Golovčenko – Croatian-Russian caricaturist, comic book author and writer
- Svetlana Mironyuk – manager, professor of Business Practice, innovation catalyst and dean of operations and digital at SKOLKOVO School of Management
- Irina Miroshnichenko – Soviet film and theatre actress, People's Artist of the RSFSR (1988)
- Viktoria Miroshnichenko – actress known for her roles in cinema and theater
- Konon Molody – KGB intelligence officer, known in the West as Gordon Arnold Lonsdale
- Tetiana Montian – blogger
- Darya Moroz – screen and stage actress, Honored Artist of Russia (2015)
- Karinna Moskalenko – human rights lawyer
- Oleksandr Muzychko – Ukrainian political activist, a member of UNA-UNSO and coordinator of Right Sector in Western Ukraine.Was born near the Ural Mountains
- Olga Naumenko – actress
- Ivan Nechepurenko – writer and journalist
- Iona Nikitchenko – judge of the Supreme Court of the Soviet Union
- Alexander Oleshko – theater and film actor, TV presenter, singer, parodist, Honored Artist of Russia (2015)
- Petro Oliynik – miner and politician who served as Governor of Lviv Oblast from 2005 to 2008, Born Novovarvarovka, Primorsky Krai, Russian SFSR
- Anna Orochko – actress
- Mikhail Onufrienko - blogger
- Viktor Ostapchuk – Ukrainian railway administrator and later Ukrainian parliamentary (born on May 16, 1955, in Magnitogorsk, Chelyabinsk Oblast,Russian SFSR)
- Petro Osypenko – Soviet public prosecutor
- Marina Ovsyannikova (Tkachuk) – journalist who was employed on the Channel One Russia TV channel
- Diana Panchenko – journalist and TV presenter
- Daria Pavlenko – ballet dancer
- Pavel Pavlenko – Soviet stage and film actor
- Pyotr Pavlenko – Soviet writer
- Gleb Pavlovsky – political scientist
- Aleksei Petrenko – Soviet film and stage actor
- Igor Petrenko – actor
- Viktor Petrik – businessman, claims to have made a number of scientific breakthroughs which he markets through his company
- Nina Kukharchuk-Khrushcheva – First Lady of USSR, the second wife of the Soviet leader Nikita Khrushchev
- Lyubov Polishchuk – actress
- Maria Politseymako – actress
- Maria Ponomarenko – journalist and human rights activist
- Zhanna Prokhorenko, Soviet actress
- Igor Prokopenko – documentary filmmaker, journalist, TV presenter, writer and creator of entertainment programs, deputy director general for documentary and nonfiction projects of the REN TV television company
- Petro Prokopovych – founder of commercial beekeeping and the inventor of the first movable frame hive
- Tatyana Protsenko – Soviet actress, best known for her role as Malvina in the 1975 film The Adventures of Buratino
- Viktor Pshonka – former prosecutor general of Ukraine (2010–2014), state counselor of justice of Ukraine and member of the High Council of Justice of Ukraine
- Mikhail Ptukha – statistician and demographer
- Ludmilla Radchenko – model
- Alexei Romanenko – cellist
- John Rudenko – bishop of Urzhum and Omutninsk of the Russian Orthodox Church, radiophysicist, candidate of physical and mathematical sciences (1994) and lecturer at Novosibirsk State Technical University (1990s)
- Roman Rudenko – procurator general of the Soviet Union (1953–1981); chief prosecutor for the USSR at the 1946 trial of the major Nazi war criminals in Nuremberg
- Sergey Samsonenko – businessman
- Gleb Savchenko – dancer and choreographer
- Anatoly Savenko – Russian nationalist, social and political activist, lawyer, writer, essayist and journalist
- Natalya Sayko – actress
- Stepan Senchuk – politician from Our Ukraine, governor of Lviv Oblast 1999–2001 (born in the city of Prokopyevsk in Kemerovo Oblast, RSFSR)
- Ulyana Sergeenko – fashion designer
- Zinaida Sharko – actress
- Yelena Shevchenko – American stage and film actress
- Faina Shevchenko – actress
- Rostislav Shilo – Soviet and Russian public figure, honoured worker of culture of the RSFSR, director of the Novosibirsk Zoo (1972–2016), honorary resident of Novosibirsk, member of the Novosibirsk city council
- Klim Shipenko – film director
- Volodymyr Shkidchenko – general of Army of Ukraine, minister of defence of Ukraine 2001–2003 (born in Chita, Zabaykalsky Krai, Russian SFSR)
- Alexander Shkurko – historian and politician
- Yuri Shvets – major in the KGB 1980–1990
- Igor Sinyak – beauty blogger
- Yuri Sipko – Baptist pastor, vice president of the World Baptist Alliance, president of the Russian Union of Evangelical Christians-Baptists (UECB) 2002–2010
- Oleg Slabynko – TV producer for the show Moment Istiny (Moment of Truth) in Moscow, Russia
- Maryana Spivak – film and television actress known for the 2017 film Loveless
- Bogdan Stashinsky – former KGB officer and spy who assassinated the Ukrainian nationalist leaders Lev Rebet and Stepan Bandera in the late 1950s
- Natasha Stefanenko – actress, model, and television presenter who lives and works in both Italy and Russia
- Sergey Stepanchenko – theater and film actor, film director
- Galina Stepanenko – ballerina
- Yelena Stepanenko – actress
- Valery Storozhik – Soviet and Russian stage, voice and film actor, Honored Artist of the Russian Federation (1995)
- Rogvold Sukhoverko – Soviet and Russian film and voice actor
- Svetlana Svirko – theatre director and actress
- Petro Symonenko – first secretary of the Central Committee of the Communist Party of Ukraine.Live in Russia since 2022.
- Dmytro Tabachnyk – politician, minister of education and science of Ukraine 2010–2014
- Sergey Tereshchenko – prime minister of Kazakhstan (1991–1994); born in an ethnic Ukrainian family in the town of Lesozavodsk, in the Primorsky Krai Region of the RSFSR
- Artemy Tereshchenko – entrepreneur, land-owner, pioneer of sugar production in the Russian Empire
- Ivan Tereshchenko (1854–1903) – collector and patron of the arts
- Simon Tereshchenko – entrepreneur, son of Artemy
- Galina Timchenko – journalist
- Gennady Timchenko – oligarch and billionaire businessman
- Valentina Tokarskaya – actress
- Leonid Topchiy – poet, writer, journalist, and translator
- Semyon Tsvigun – officer of the Soviet security police (KGB) whose sudden and unexplained death heralded a major shift in Kremlin power politics
- Larisa Udovichenko – actress, People's Artist of Russia (1998)
- Nikolay V. Storozhenko – Russian nationalist, social and political activist, historian and educator
- Svetlana Vasilenko – writer
- Kostiantyn Voblyi – economic geographer
- Darya Volga – TV and film personality
- Angelina Vovk – former presenter for the Soviet Central Television active from 1980, best known for years on Good Night, Little Ones! and Pesnya goda
- Kirill Vyshinsky – journalist
- Oleksandr Yakymenko – head of Security Service of Ukraine 2013–2014
- Lyudmyla Nastenko-Yanukovych, former First Lady of Ukraine
- Ivan Yanzhul – professor of financial law at Moscow University who established the Russian state factory inspection
- Yury Yaremenko – Soviet economist, member of the Academy of Sciences (from 1994) and director of the Institute of Economic Forecasting of the Academy
- Helen Yarmak – fashion designer, founder of the Helen Yarmak fashion house
- Vladimir Yaroshenko – ballet dancer in type danseur noble, first soloist with Yury Grigorovich's Ballet Theatre, Krasnodar, trained in classical Russian ballet school
- Aleksandr Yatsenko – actor
- Stefan Yavorsky – archbishop and statesman in the Russian Empire and the first president of the Most Holy Synod
- Nikolai Yeremenko Sr. – Soviet film and theater actor, People's Artist of the USSR (1989)
- Vitaly Zakharchenko – former Minister of Internal Affairs of Ukraine
- Valeriya Zaklunna – Soviet actress, People's Artist of Russia (22 May 2004)
- Vladimir Zamansky – Soviet and Russian stage and film actor, People's Artist of the RSFSR (1989)
- Ivan Zaporozhets – Soviet security officer and official of the OGPU-NKVD who was suspected of being involved in the assassination of Sergei Kirov in Leningrad in December 1934
- Sergei Ivanovich Zarudny – legal scholar, lawyer, senator, and privy councillor in the Russian Empire, mostly during the reign of Alexander II
- Anastasia Zavorotnyuk – actress and television presenter
- Pyotr Zaychenko – actor
- Alexander Zemlianichenko – photojournalist, two times Pulitzer Prize winner
- Leonid Zhunko – politician
- Oleksiy Zhuravko – politician
- Mikhail Zvinchuk – milblogger and author of the Russian Telegram channel Rybar (Russian: Рыбарь, lit. 'fisherman'), which has over 1.1 million subscribers

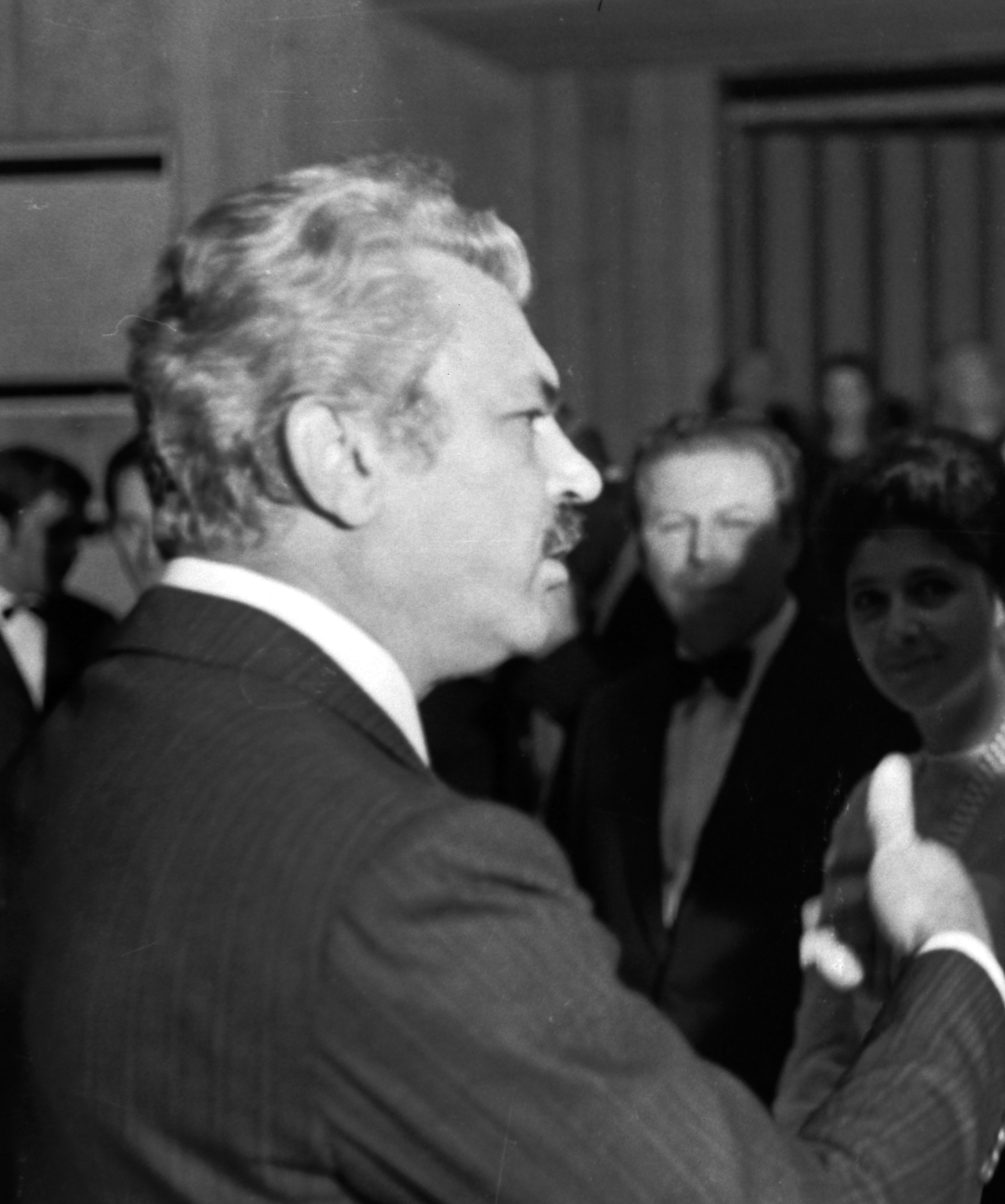
Academy Award-winning Soviet film director Sergei Bondarchuk

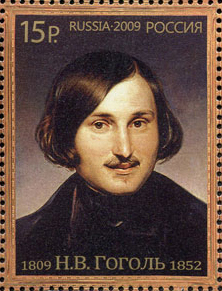
Nikolai Gogol

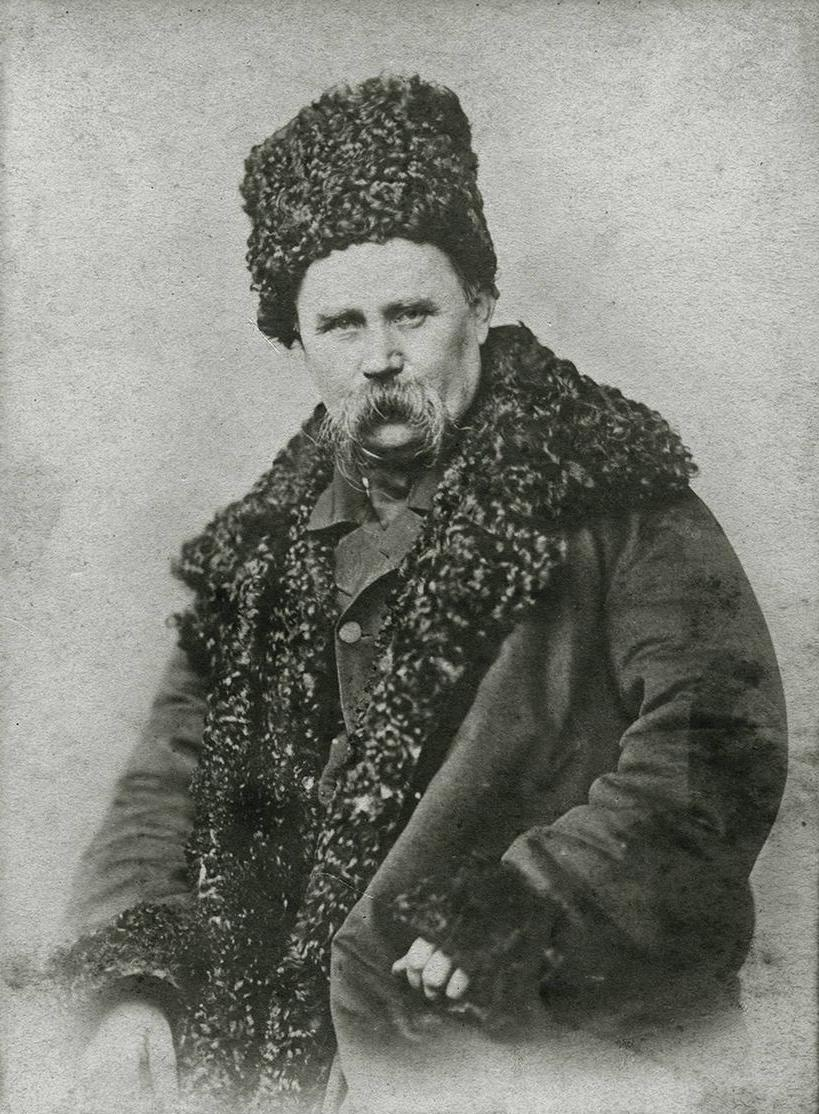
Taras Shevchenko

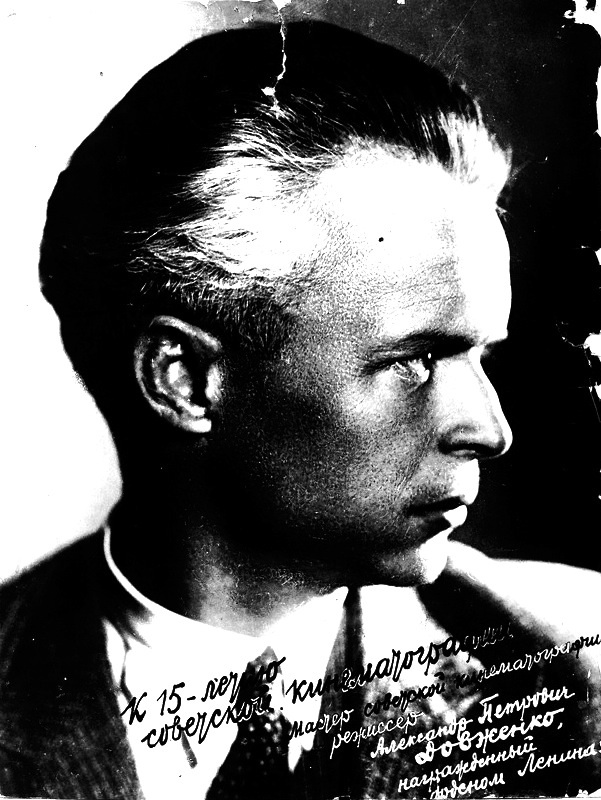
Alexander Dovzhenko

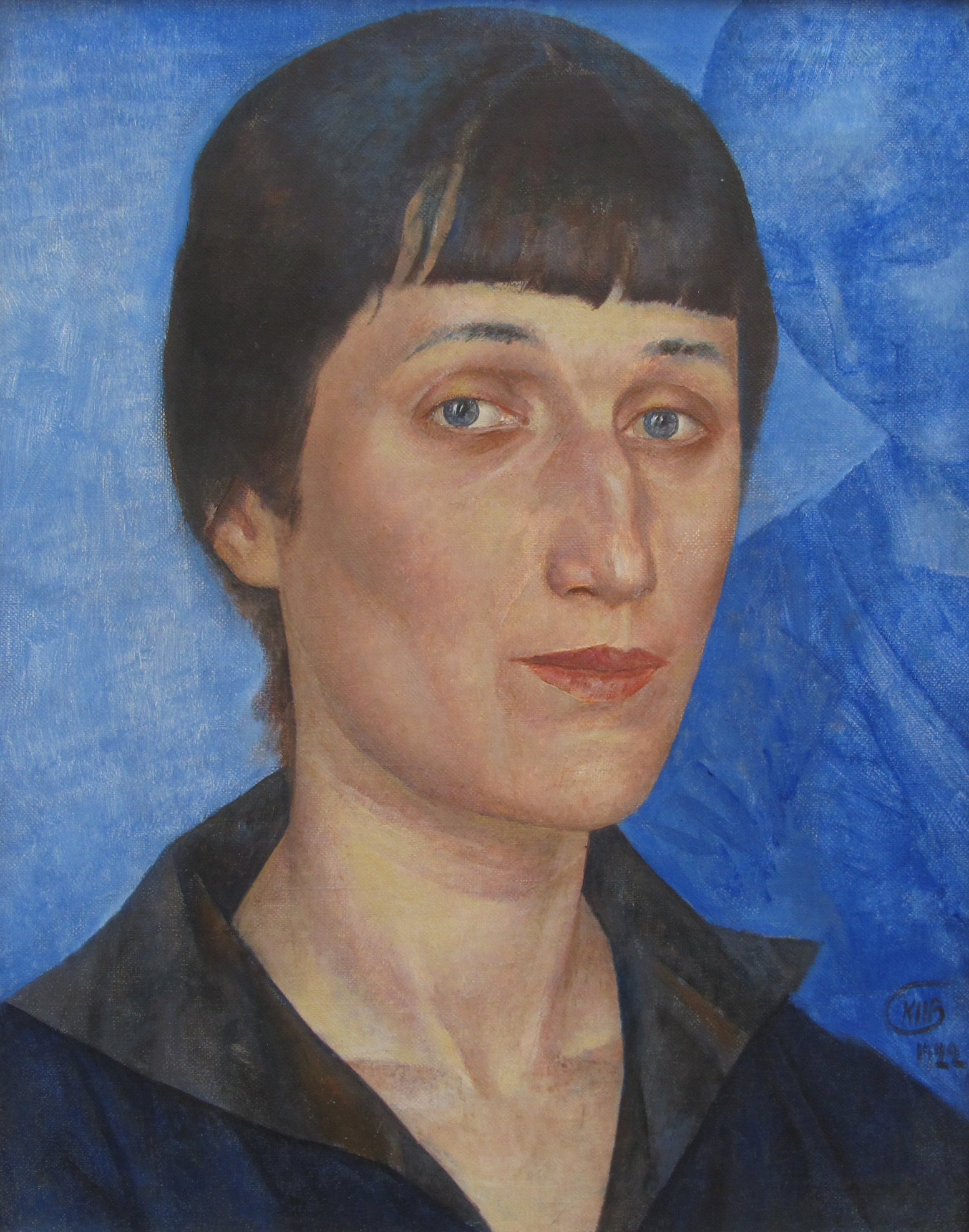
Anna Akhmatova (Gorenko)

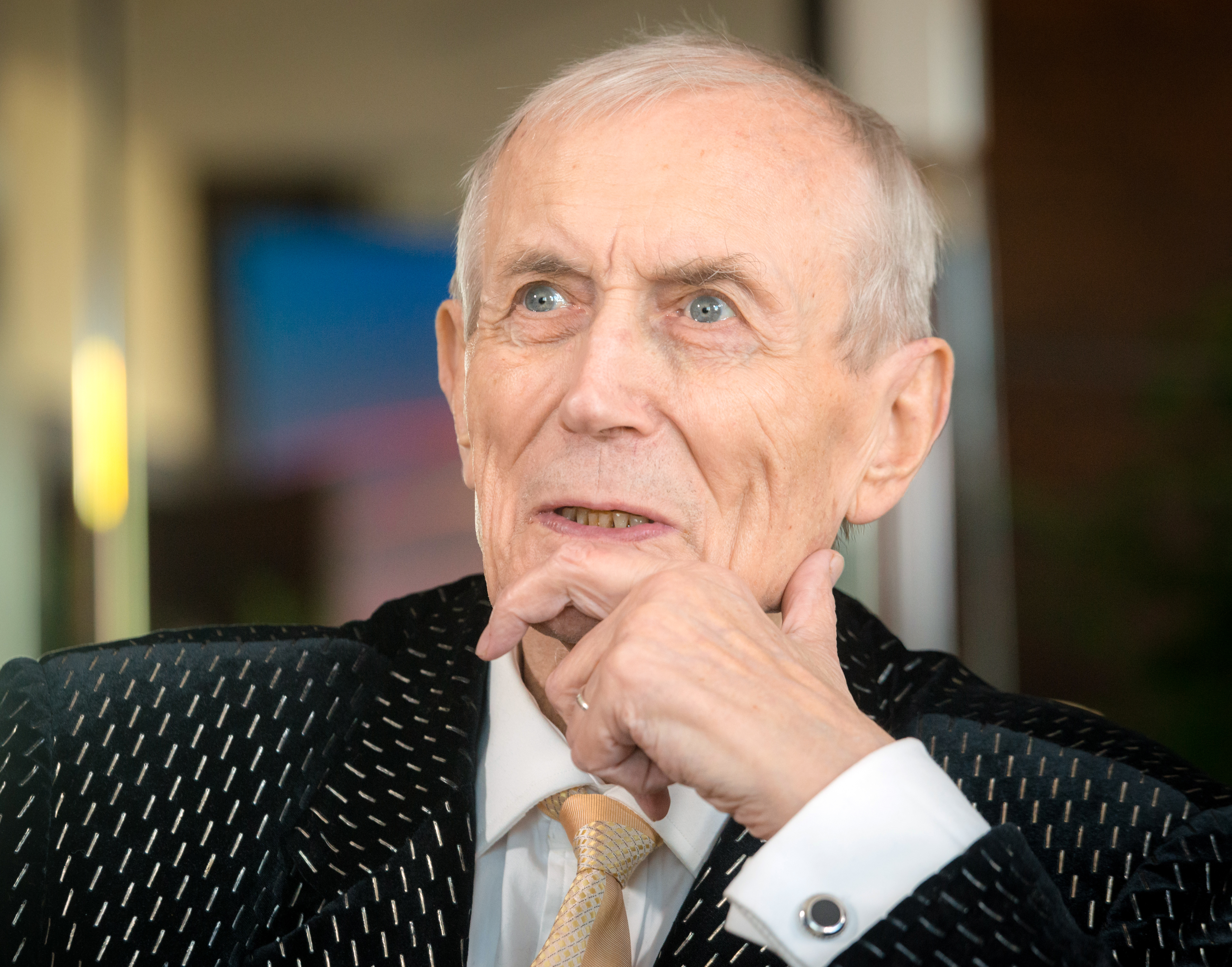
Yevgeny Yevtushenko

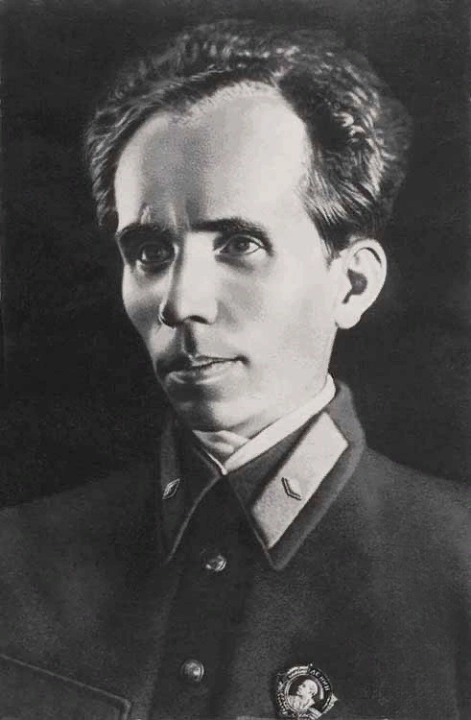
Nikolai Ostrovsky

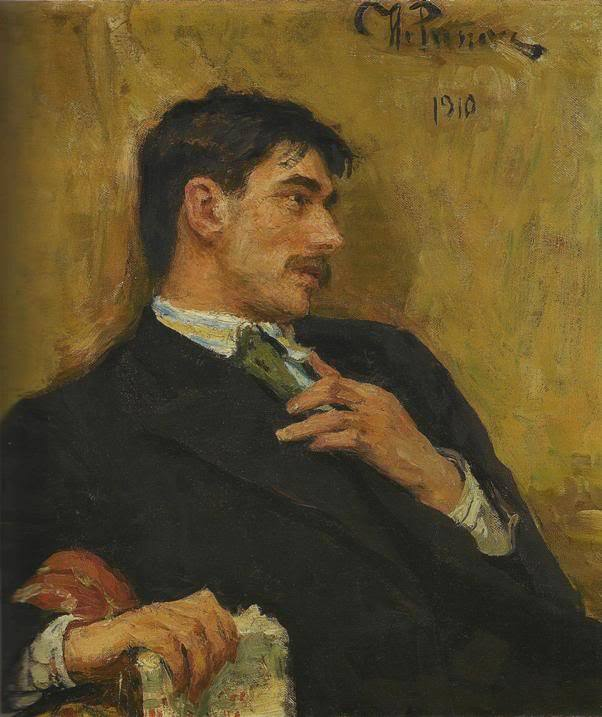
Korney Chukovsky

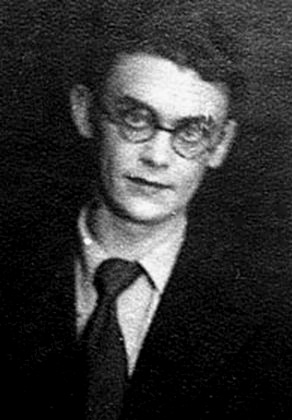
Leonid Gaidai

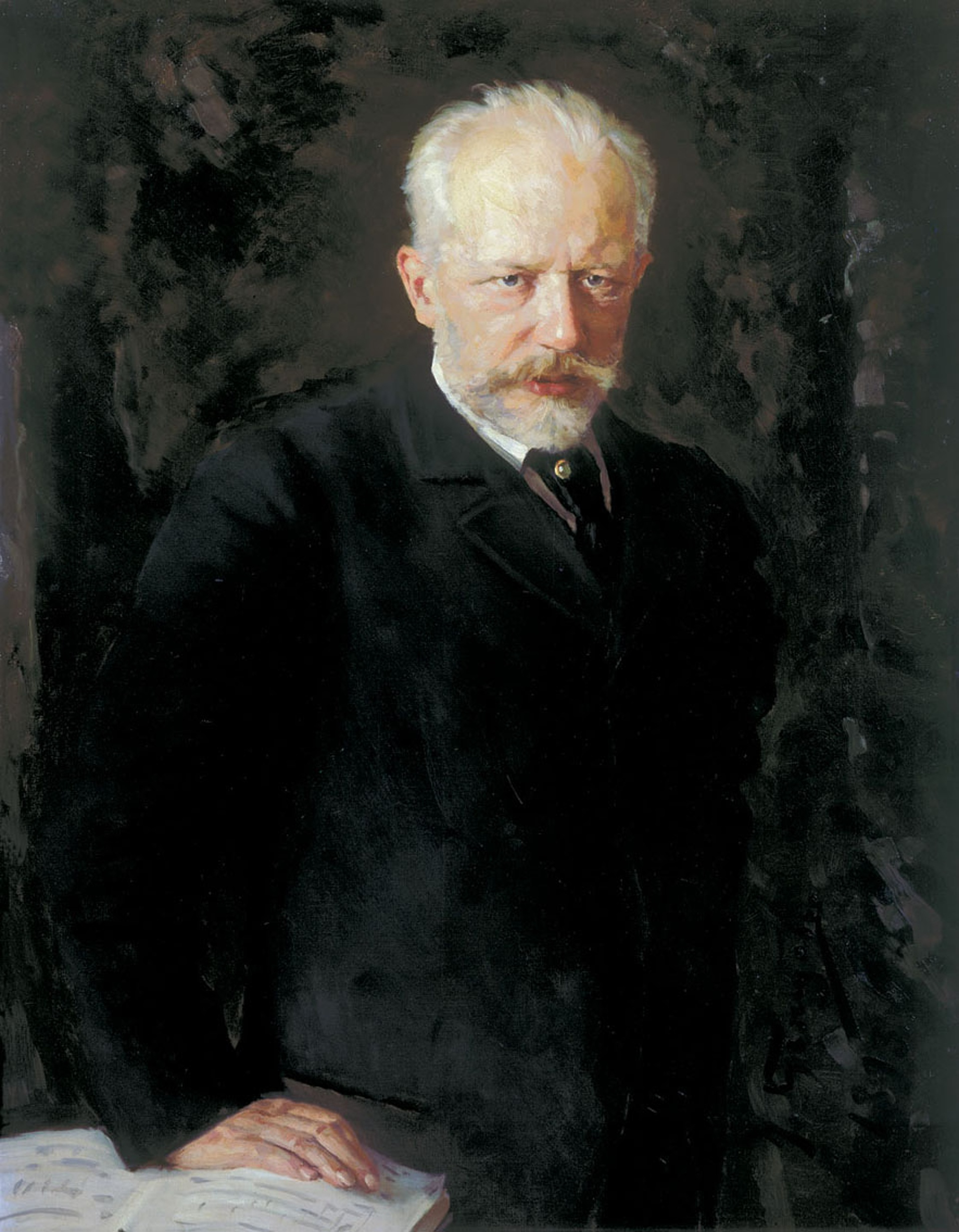
Pyotr Ilyich Tchaikovsky

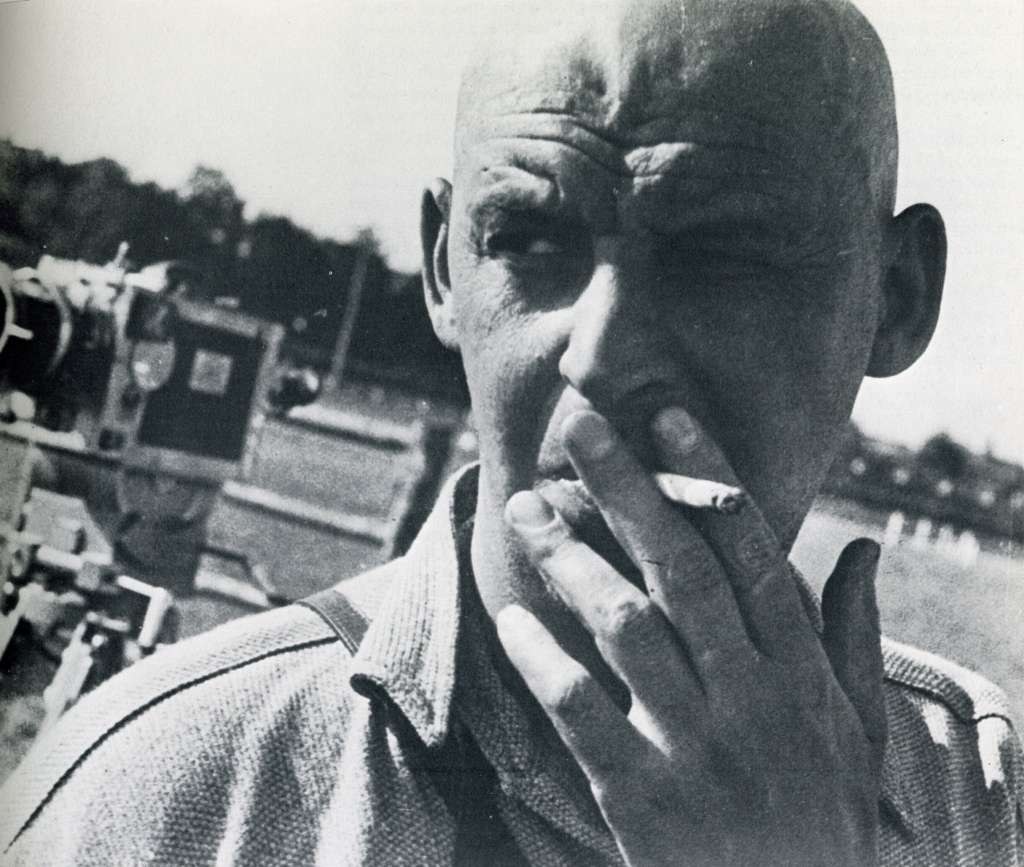
Alexander Rodchenko

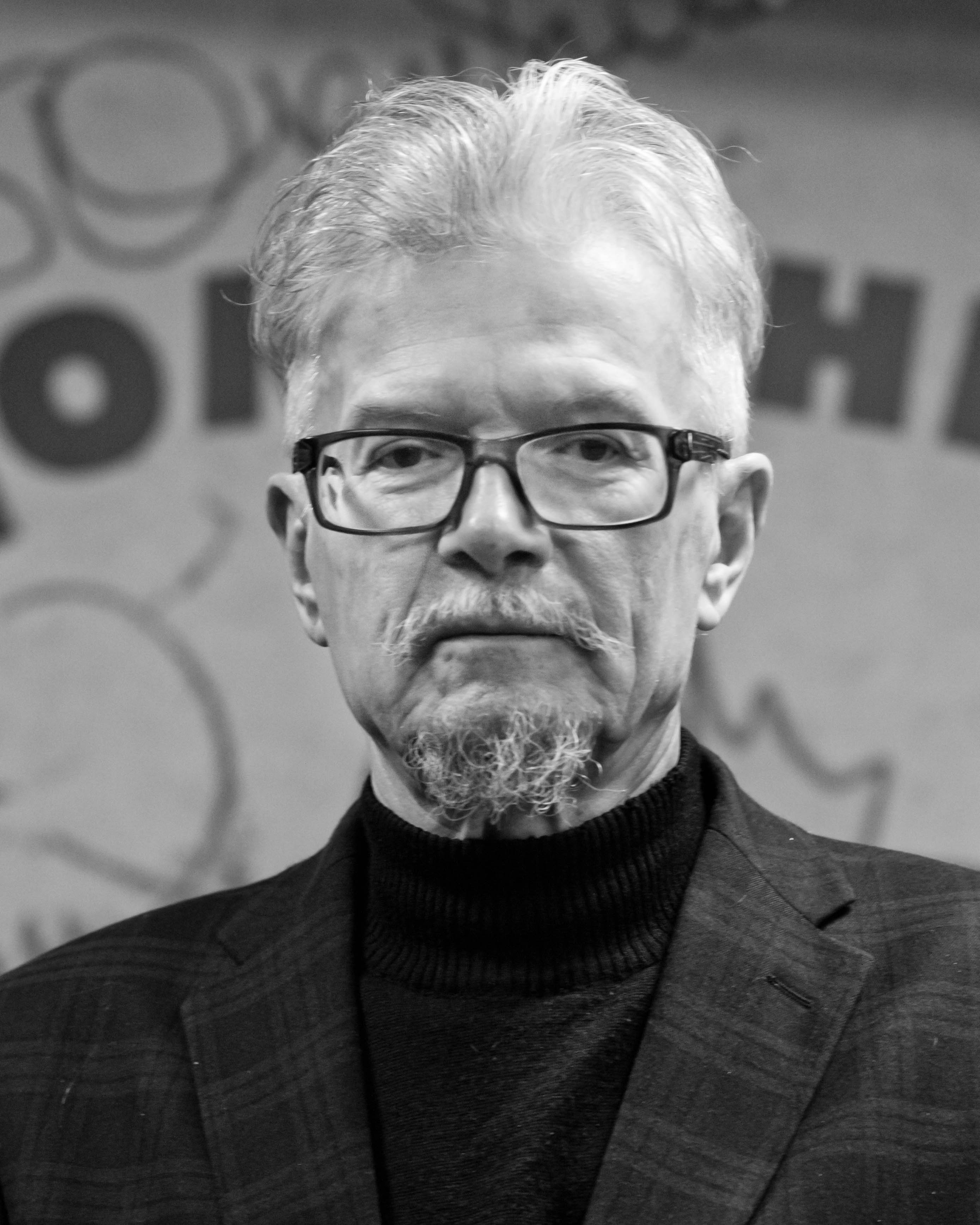
Eduard Limonov (Savenko)

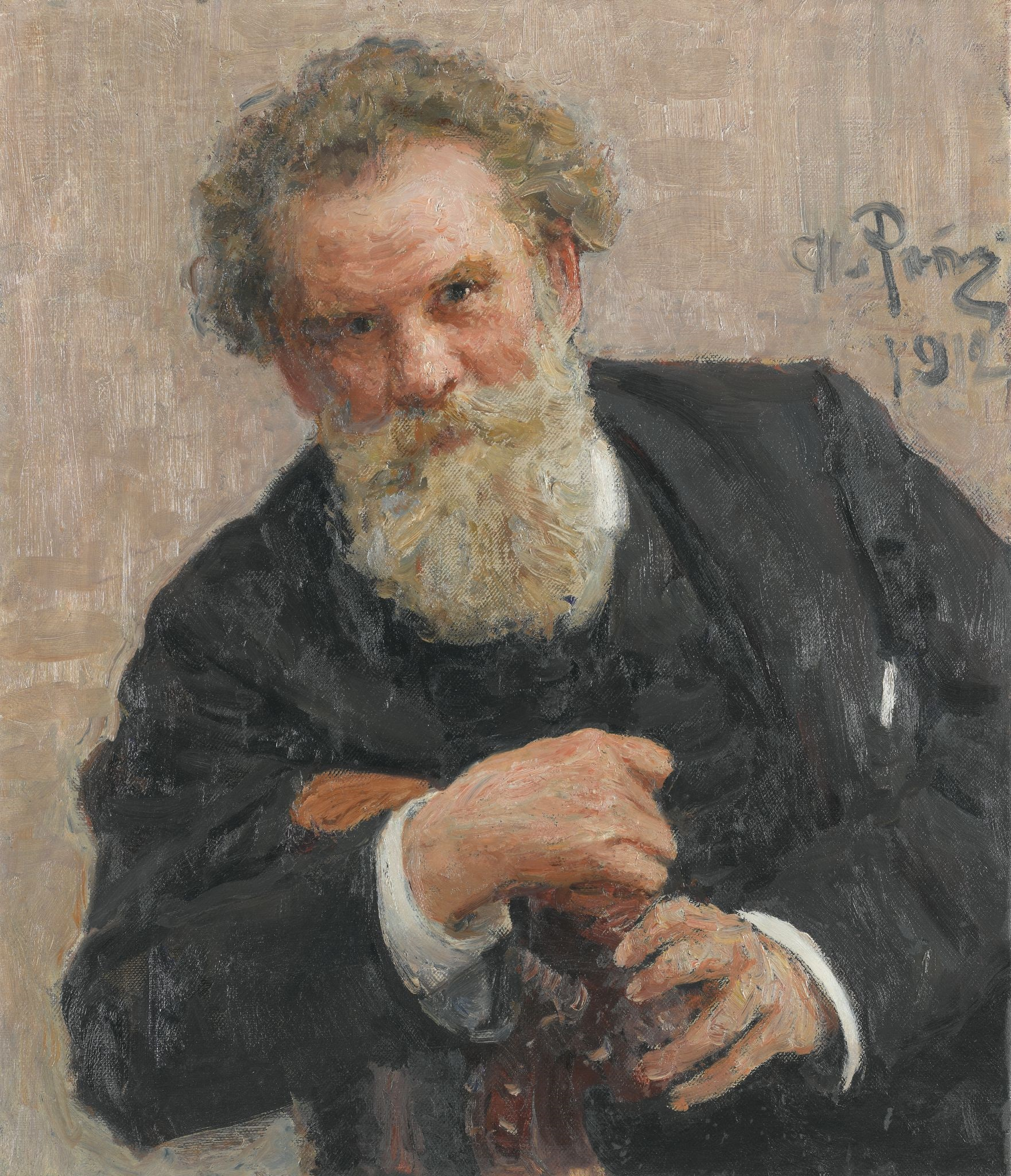
Vladimir Korolenko

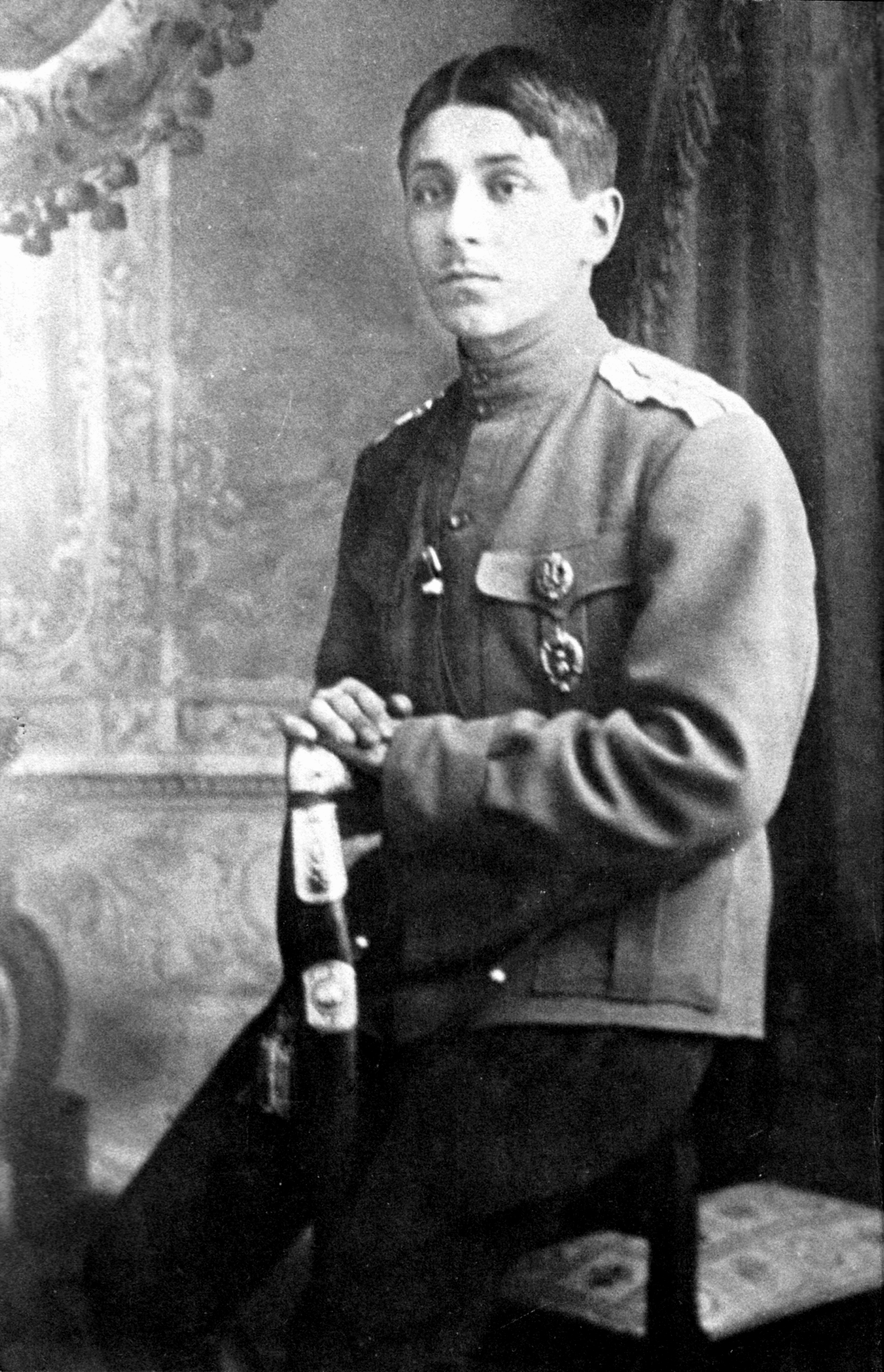
Mikhail Zoshchenko

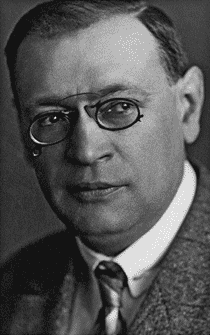
Arkady Averchenko

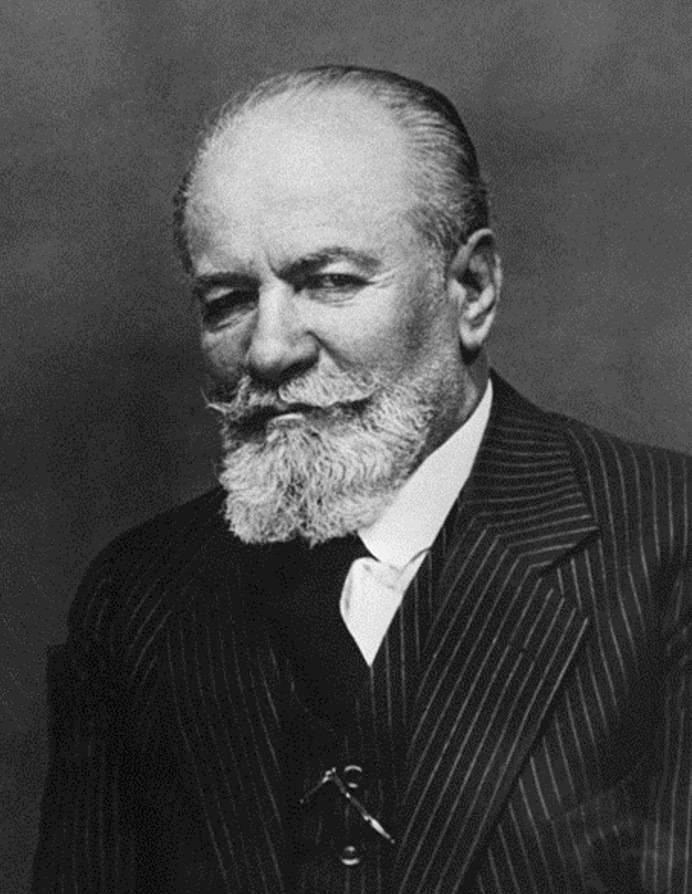
Vladimir Nemirovich-Danchenko

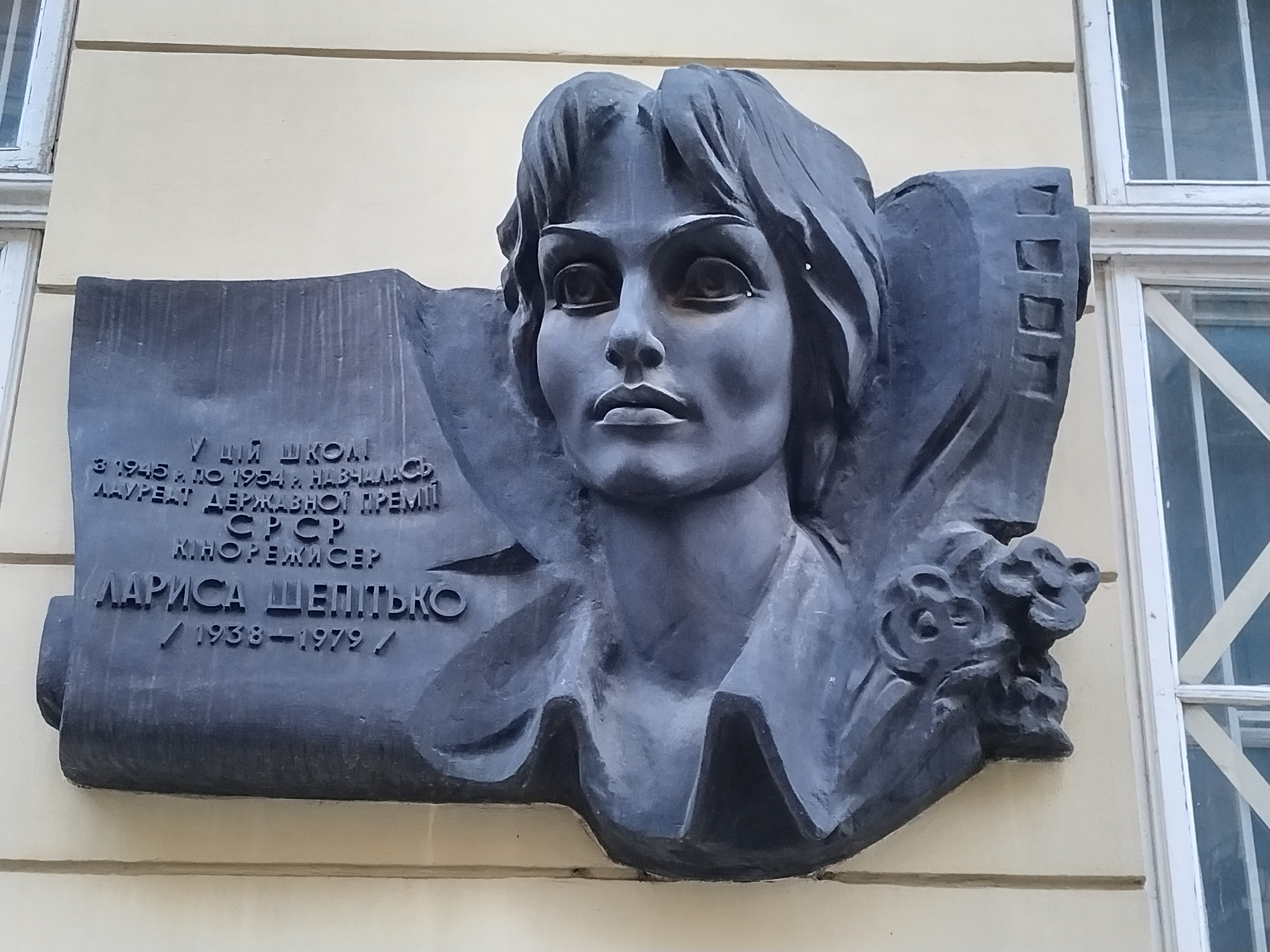
Larisa Shepitko

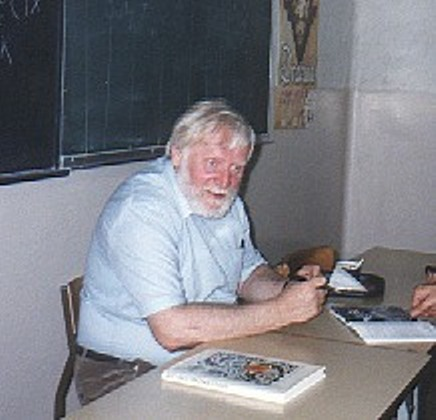
Kir Bulychev (Igor Mozheiko)

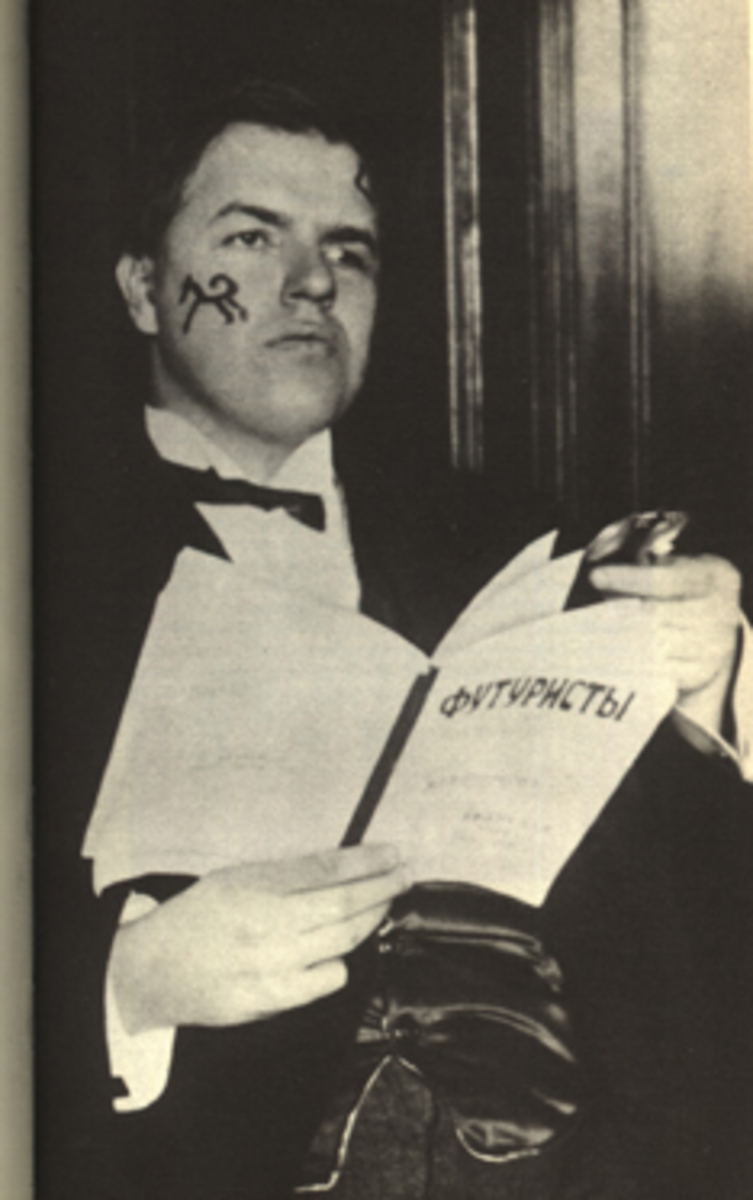
David Burliuk

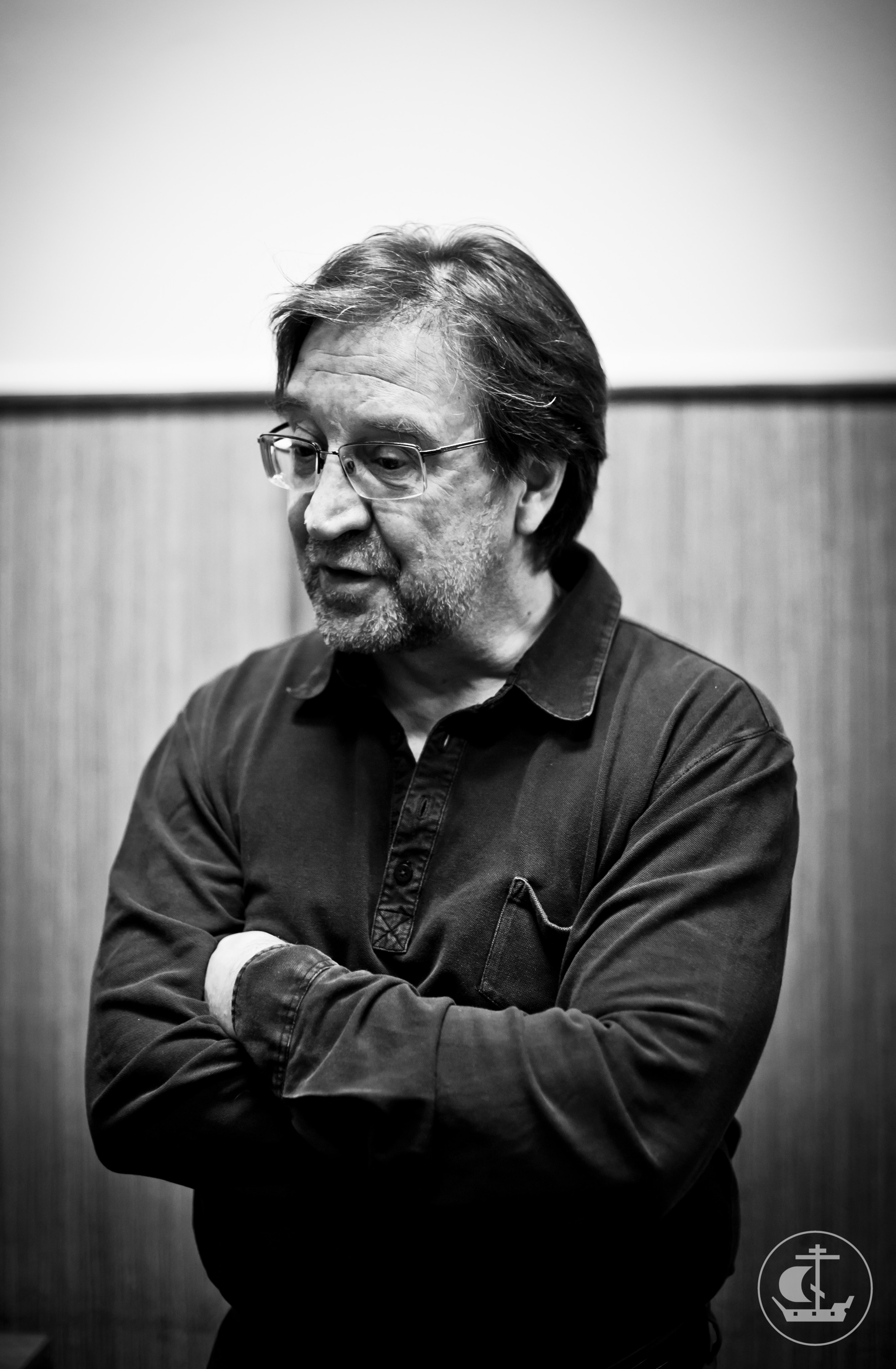
Yuri Shevchuk

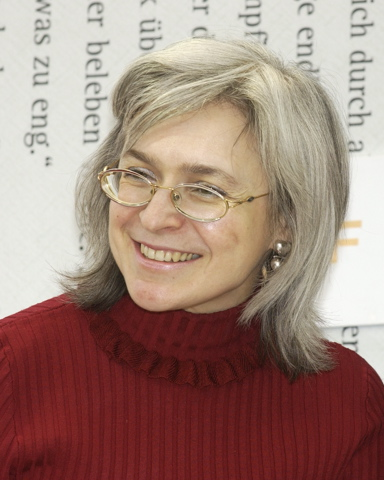
Anna Politkovskaya

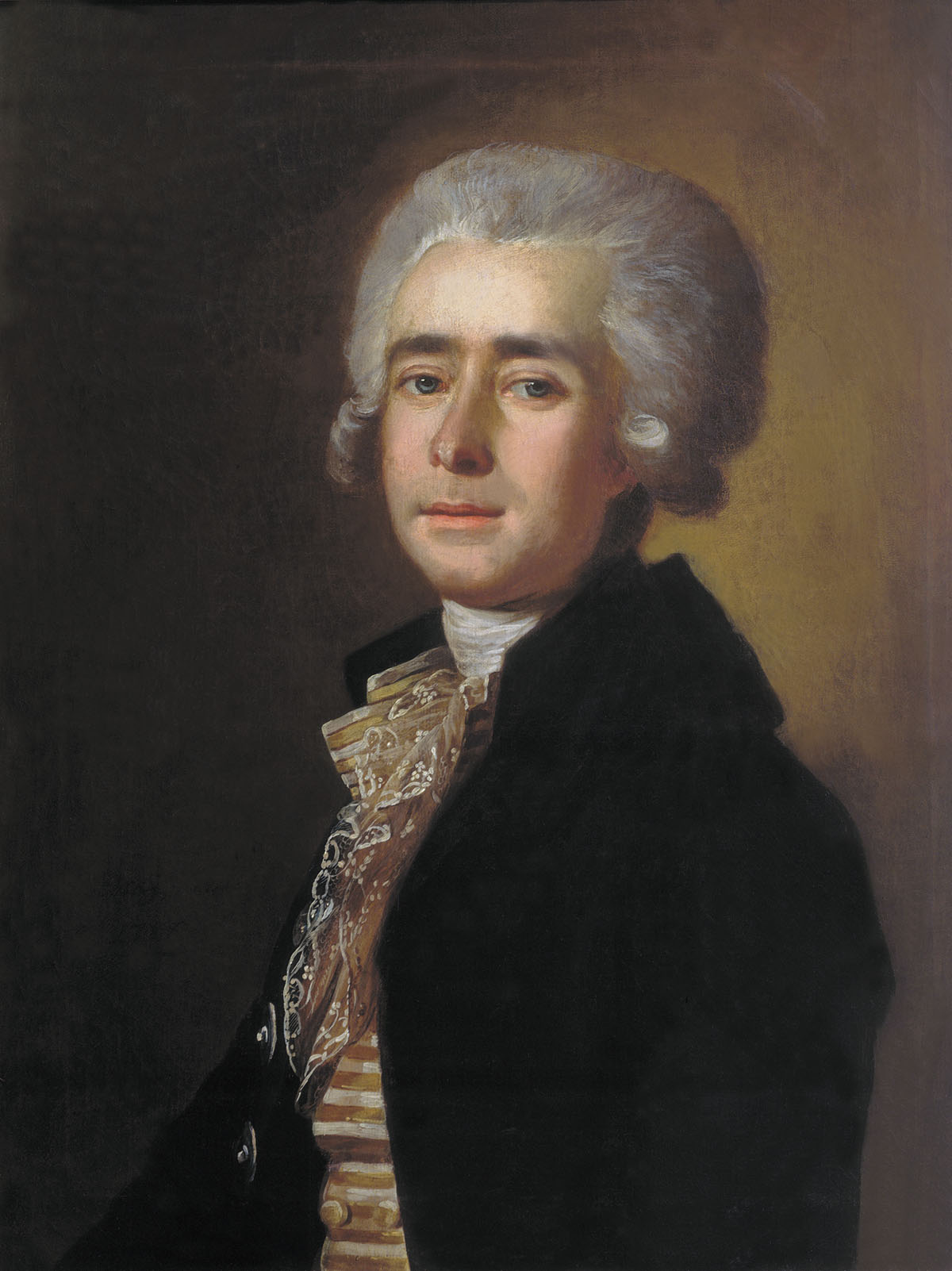
Dmitry Bortniansky

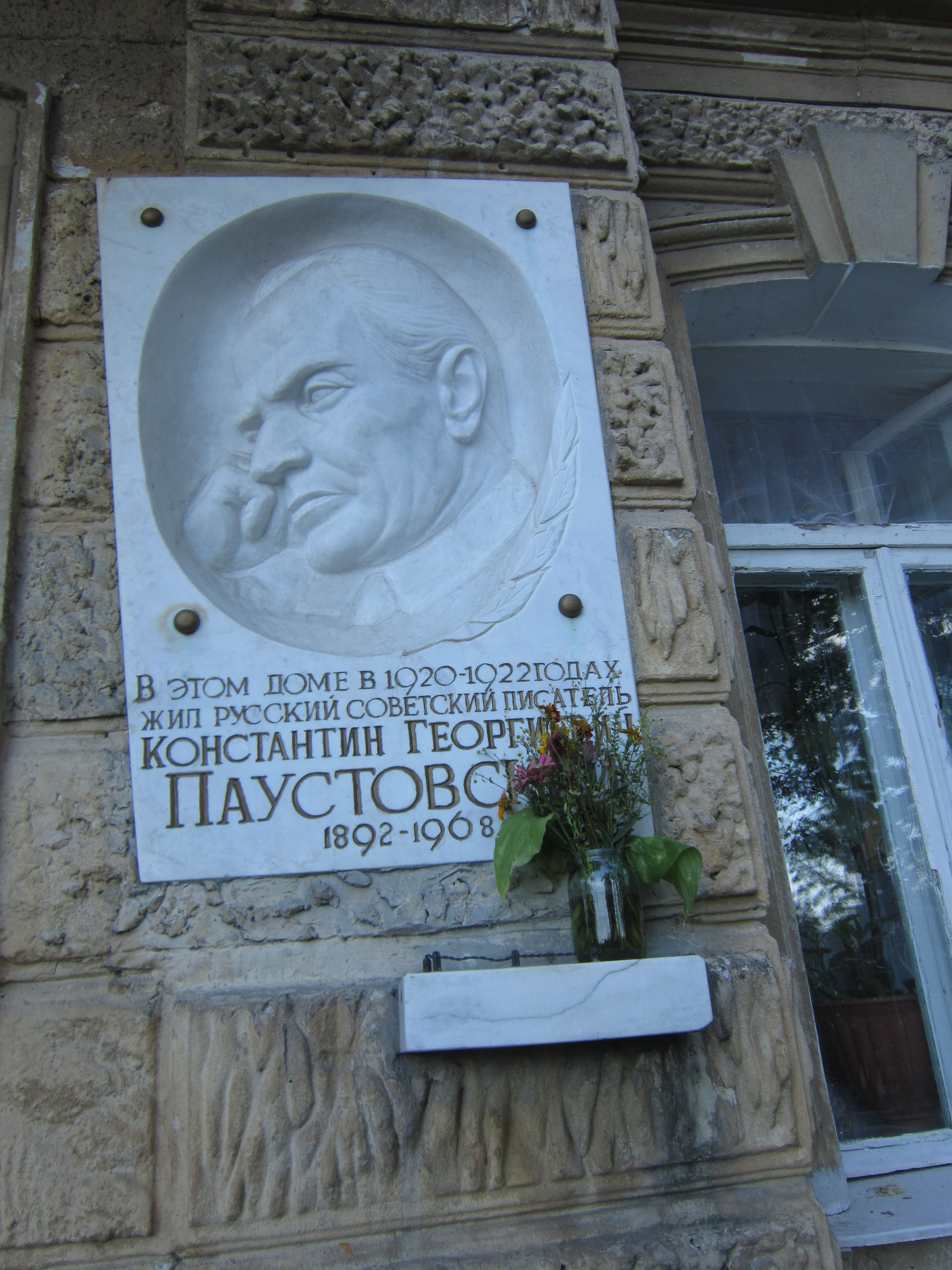
Konstantin Paustovsky

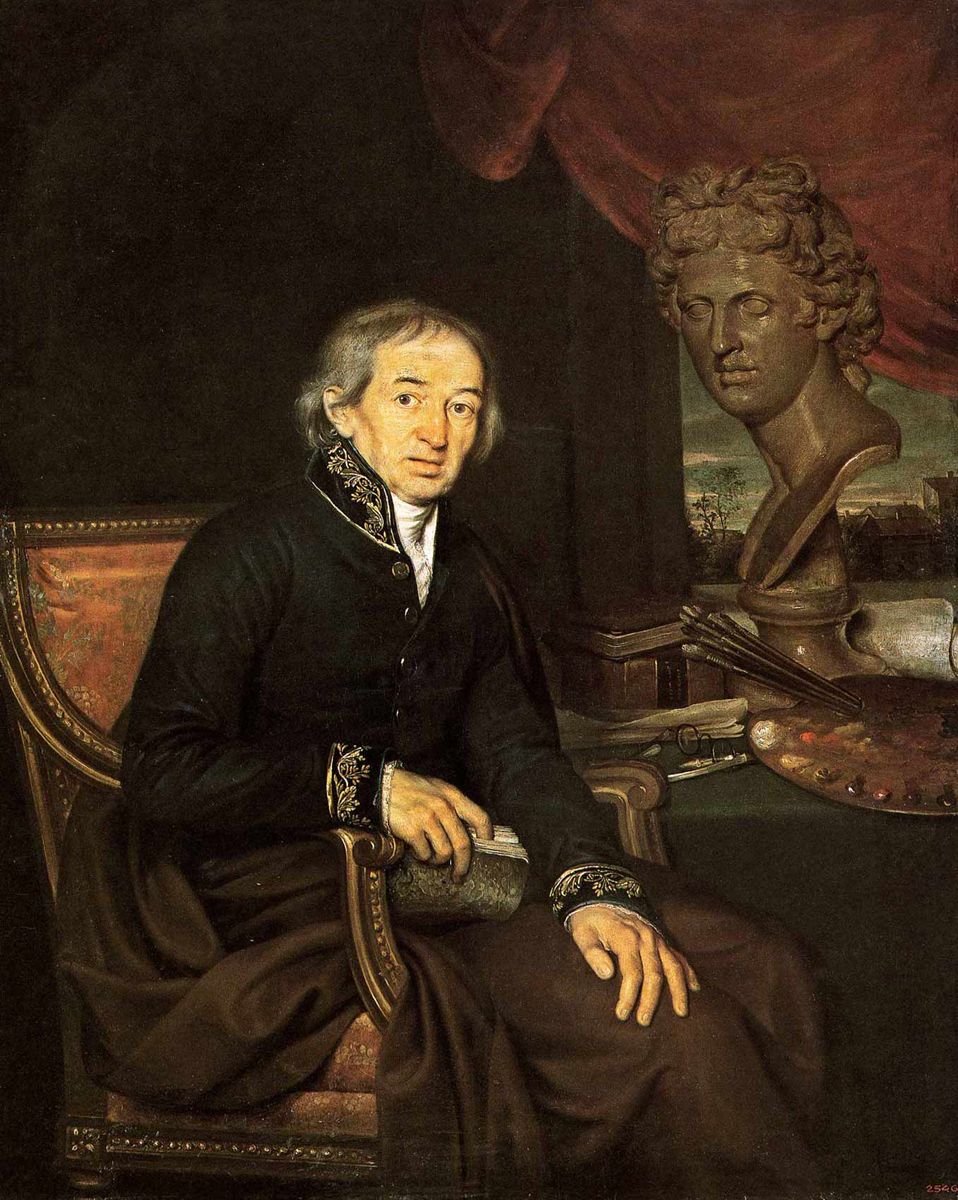
Dmitry Levitzky

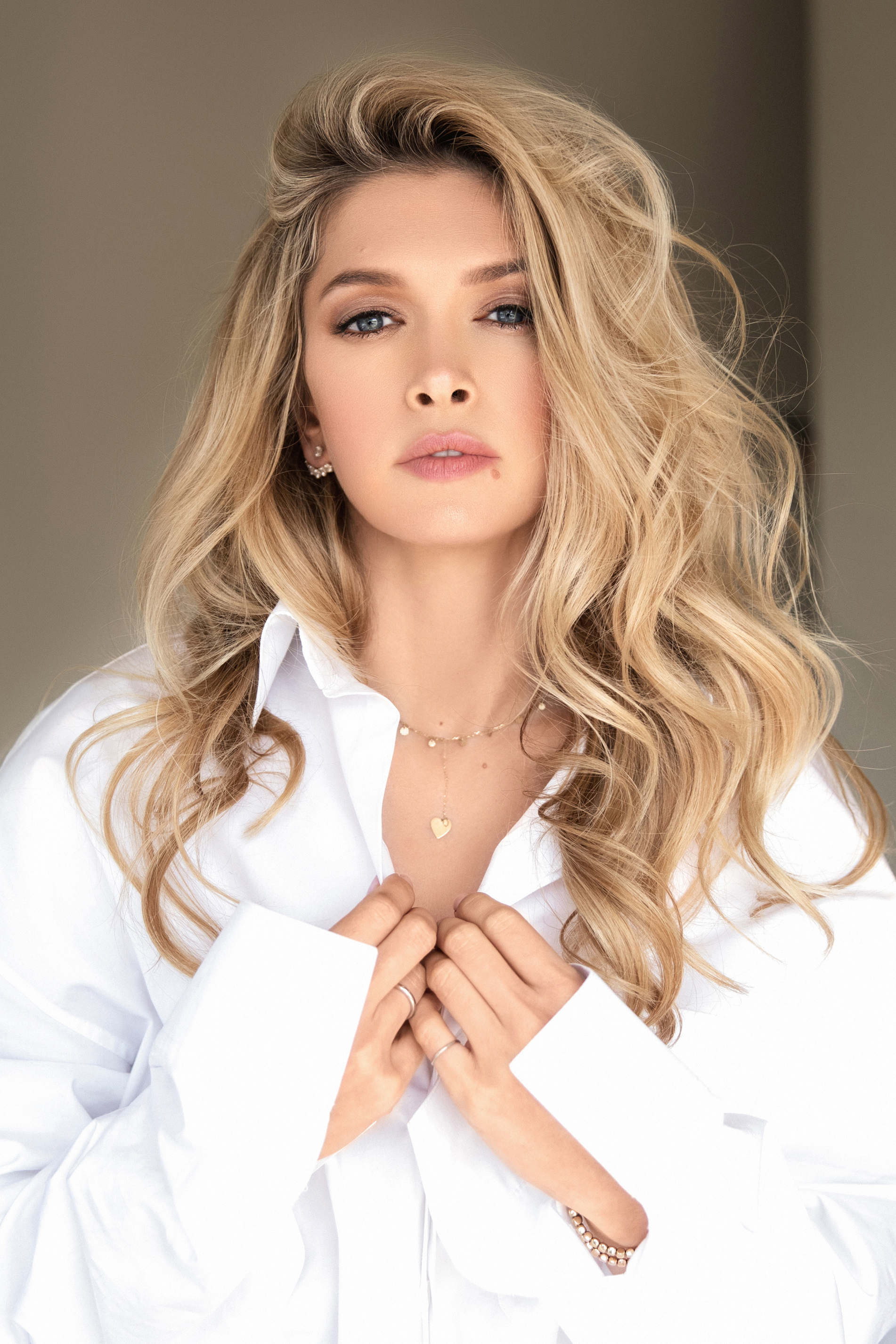
Vera Brezhneva (Halushka)

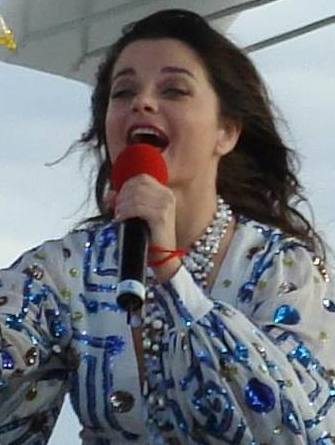
Natasha Korolyova (Porivai)

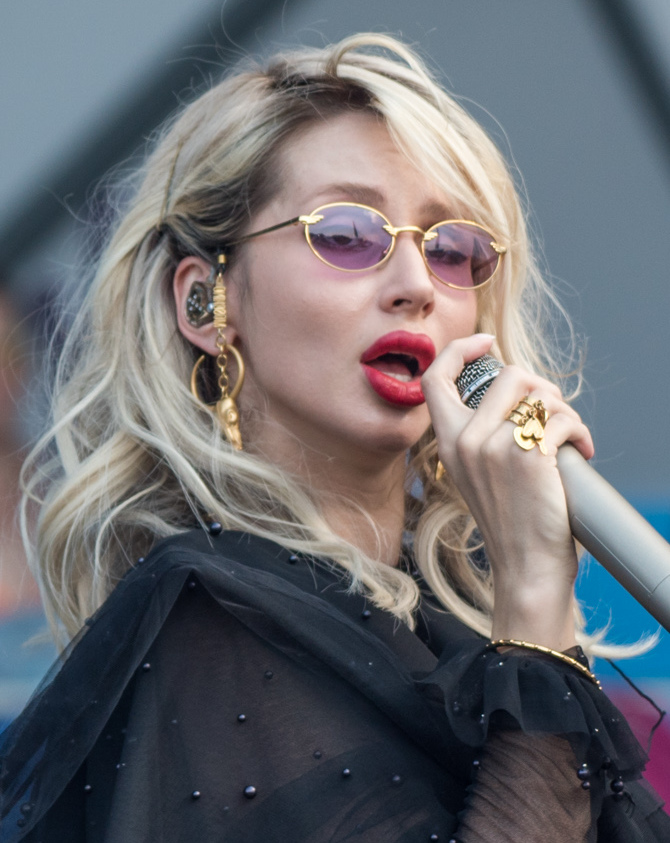
Svetlana Loboda

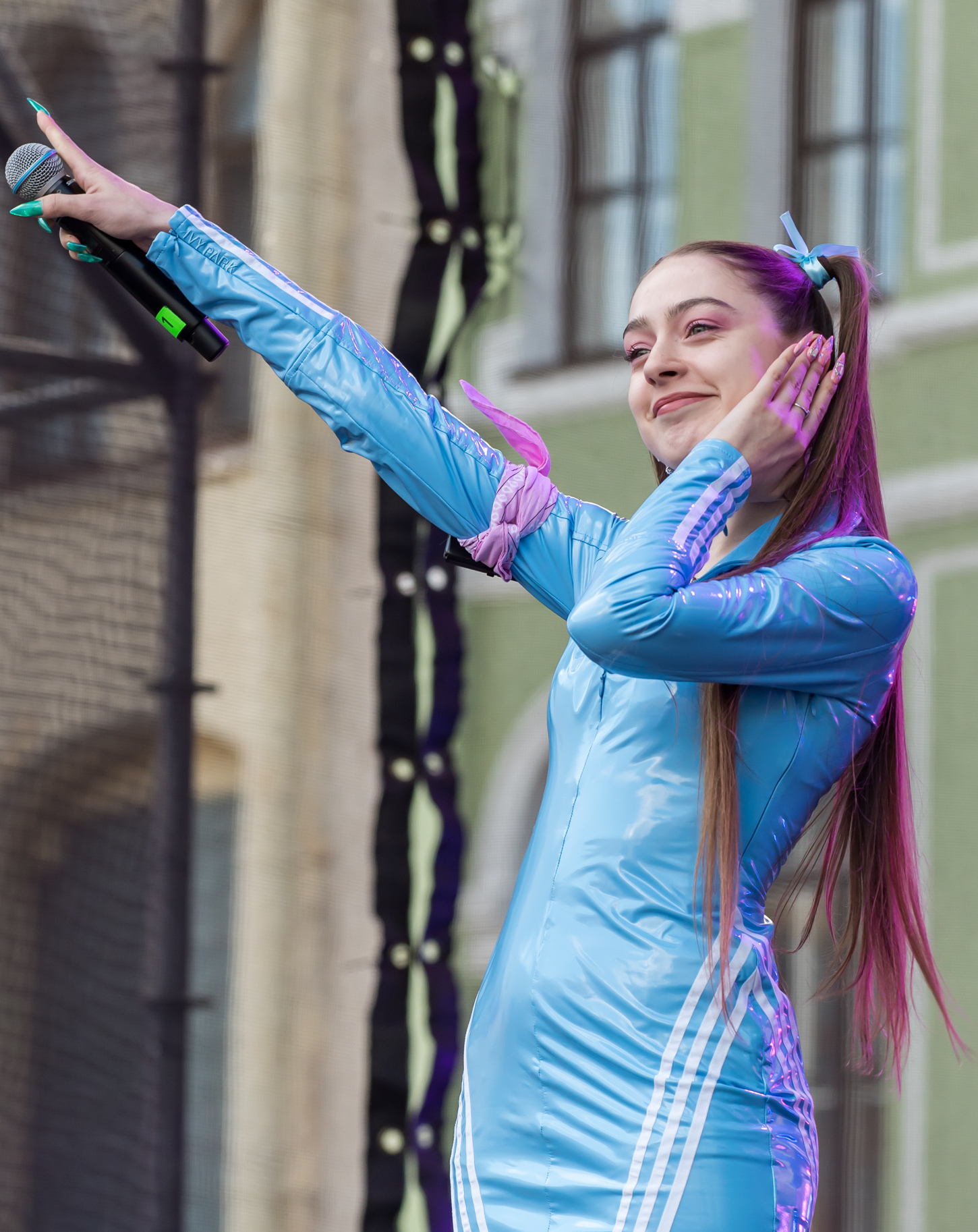
Maybe Baby (Viktoriya Lysyuk)

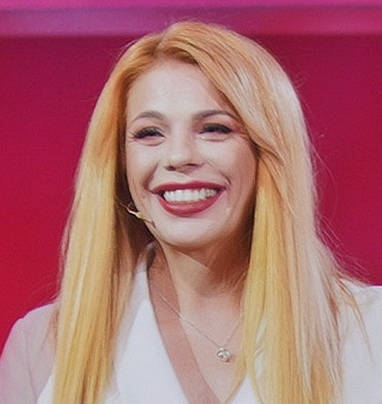
Anastasia Stotskaya

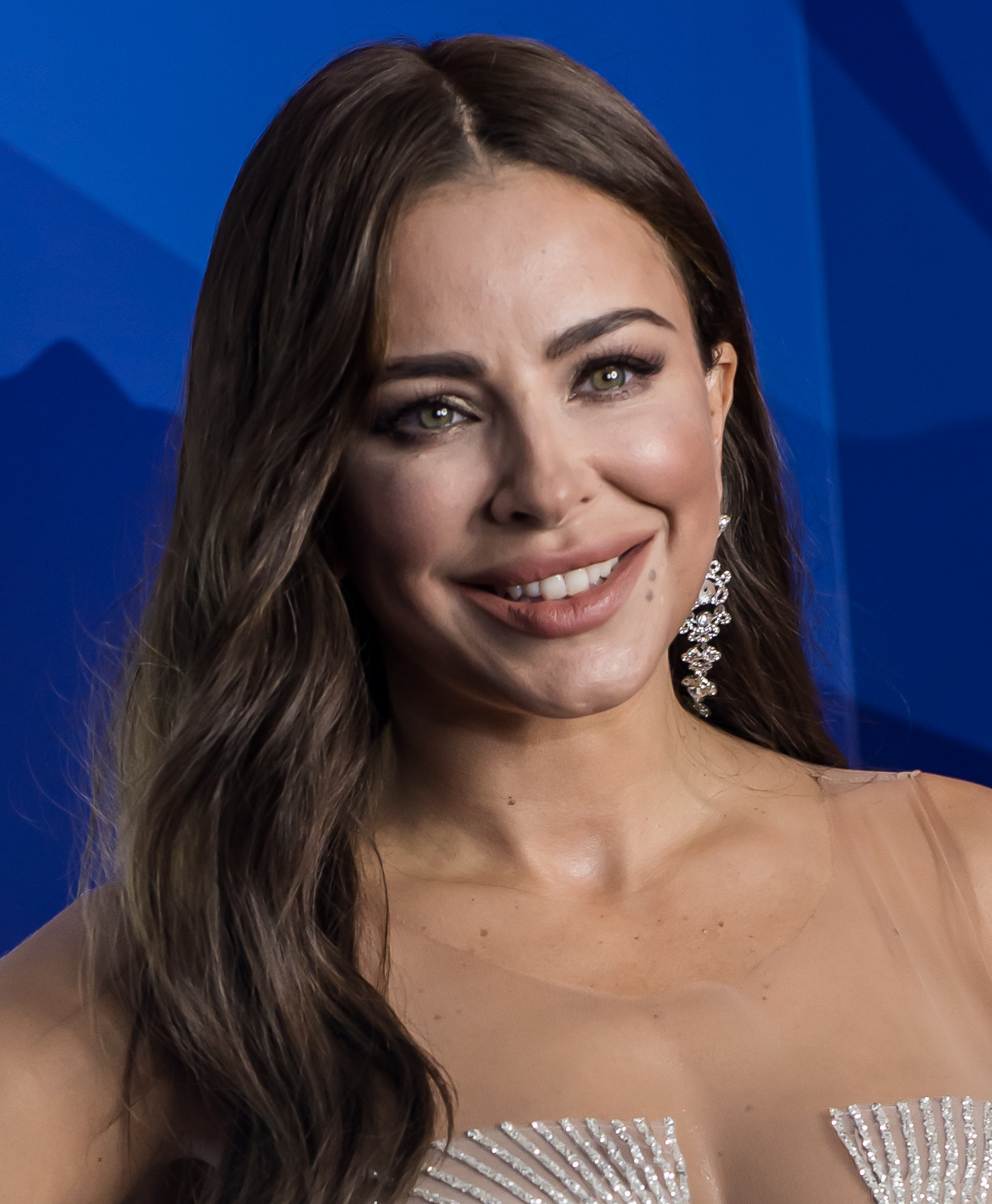
Ani Lorak

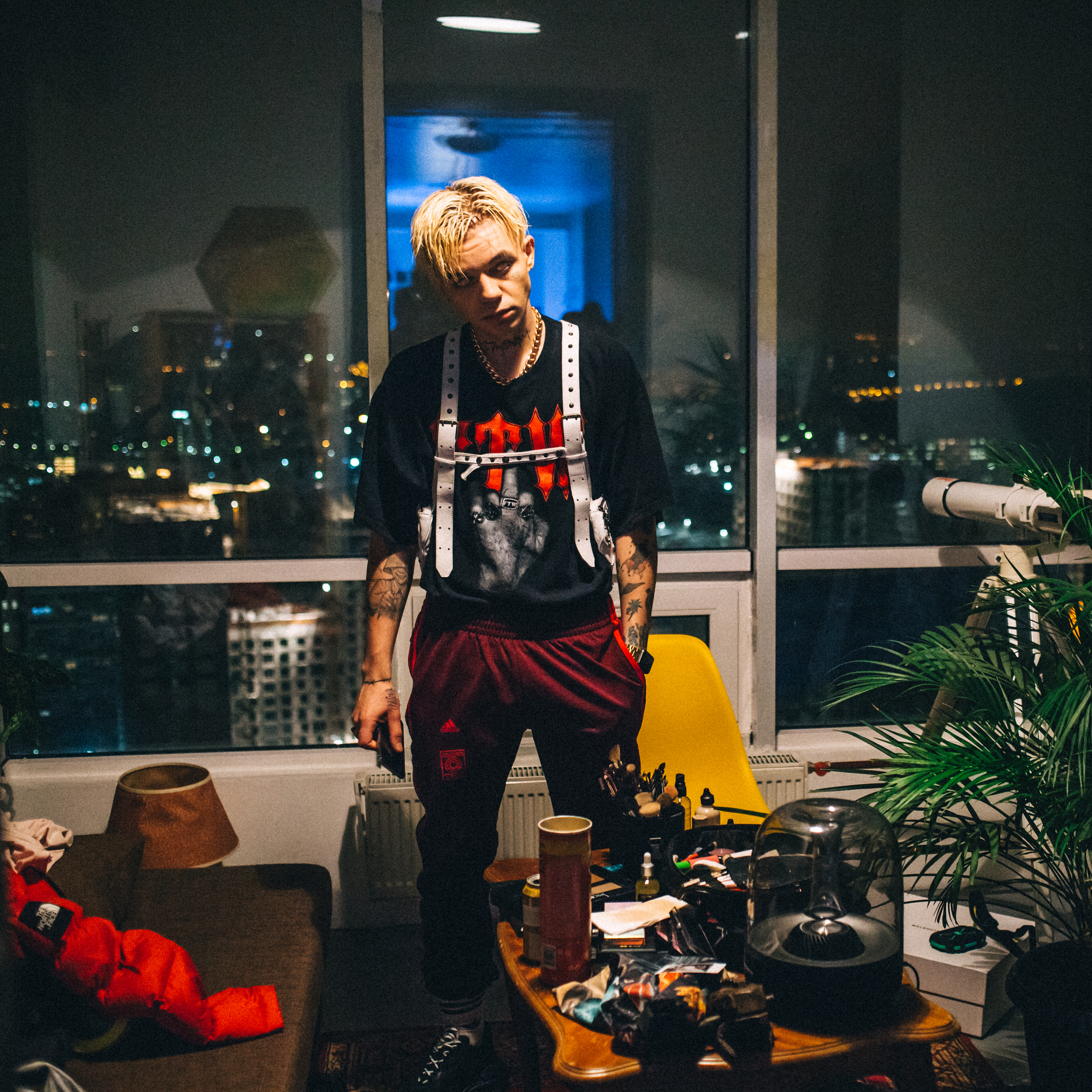
Eldzhey(Alexey Uzenyuk)

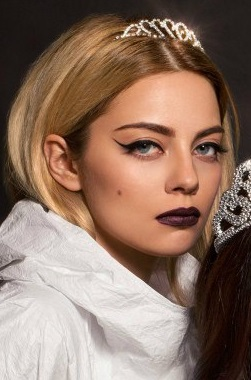
Katya Kischuk

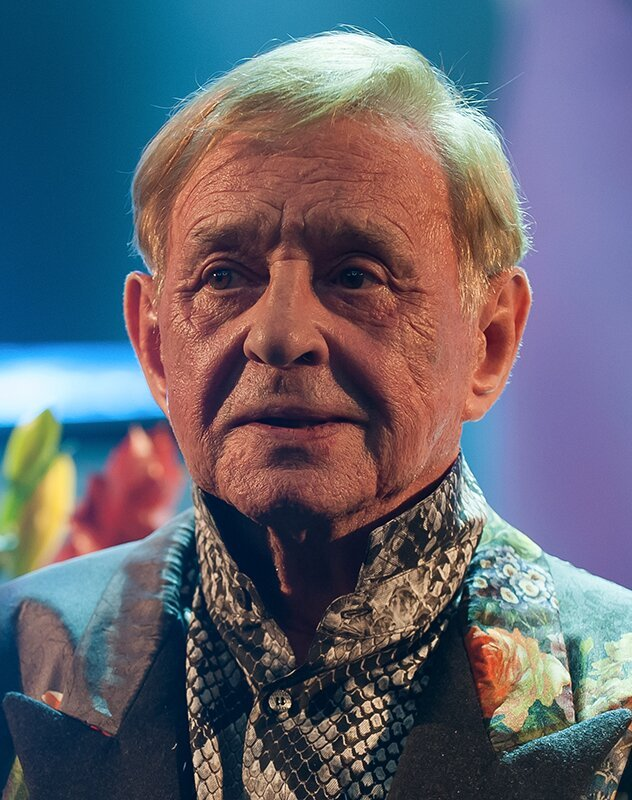
Roman Viktyuk

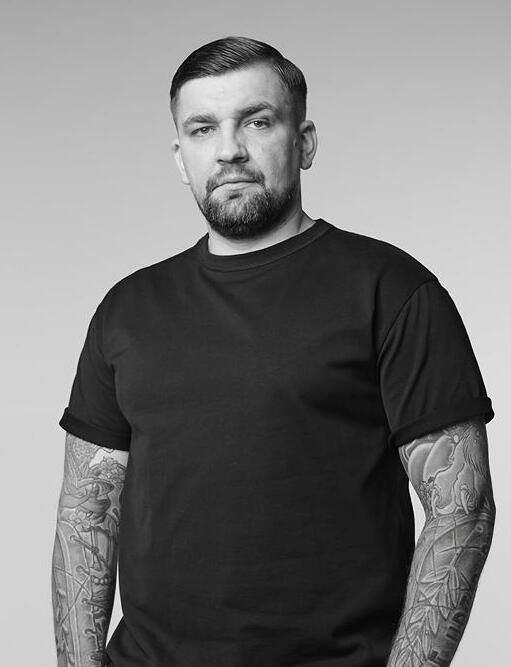
Vasiliy Vakulenko (Basta)

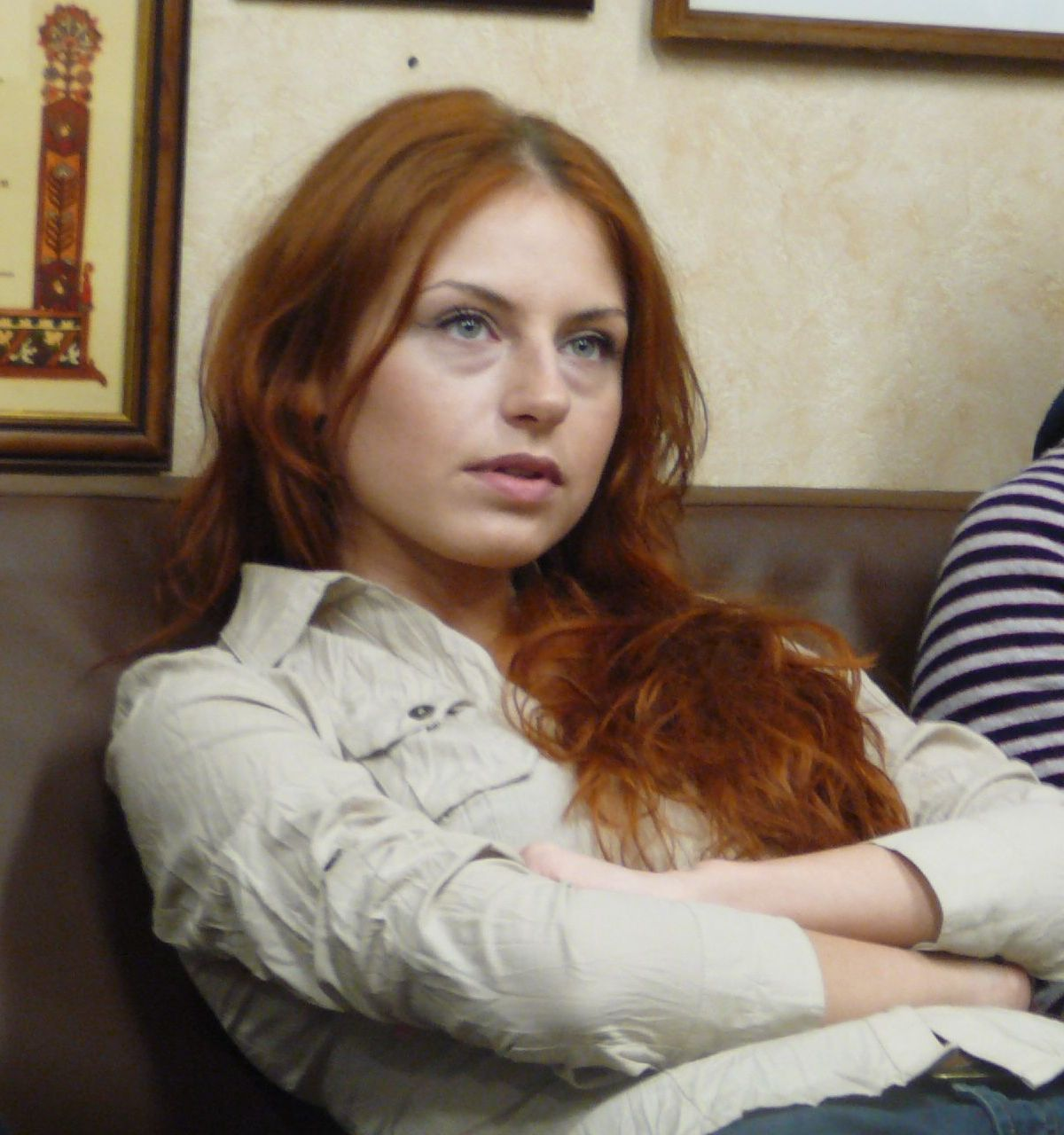
Irina Zabiyaka

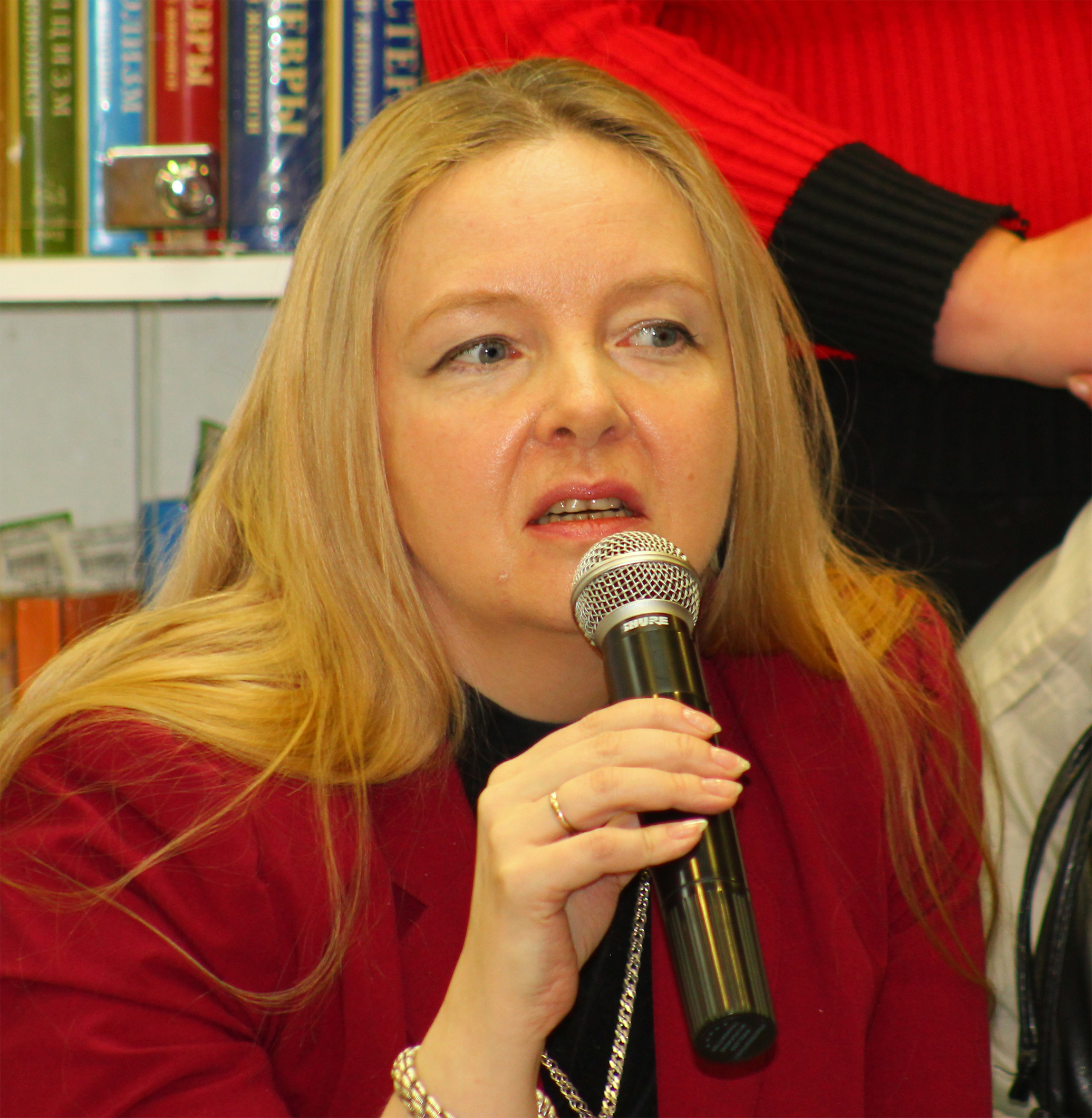
Vera Kamsha

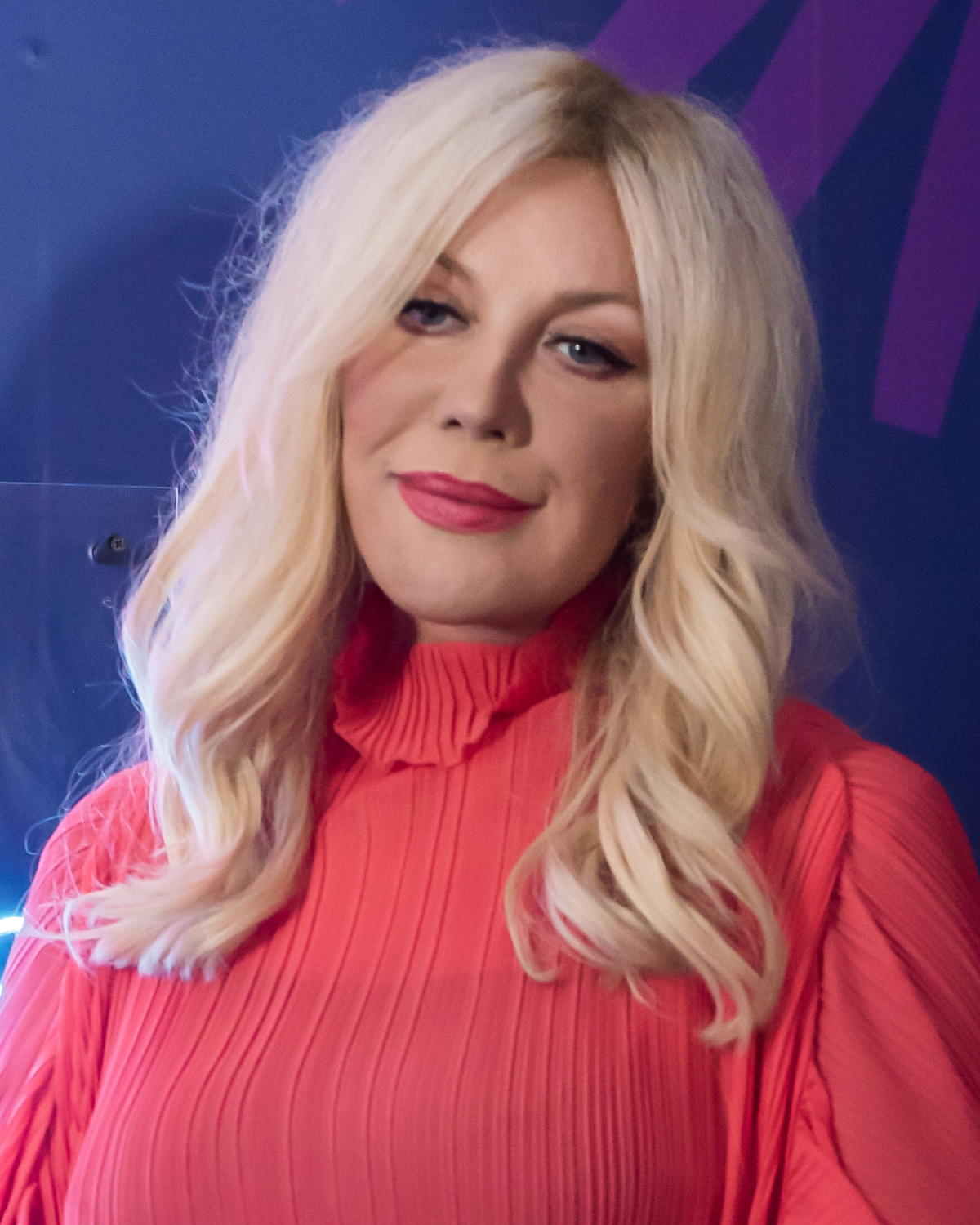
Taisia Povaliy

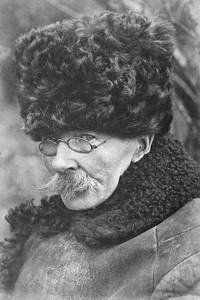
Nikolay Samokish

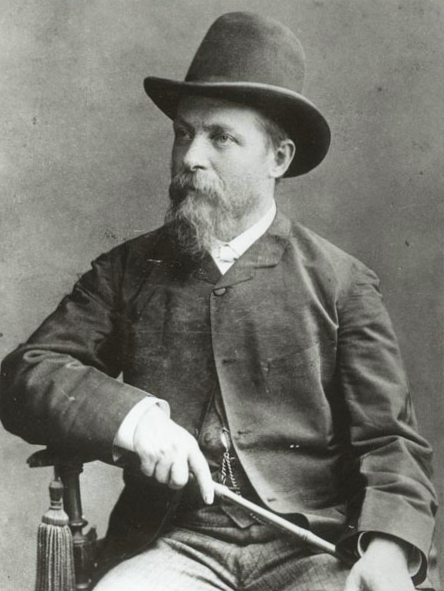
Vladimir Orlovsky

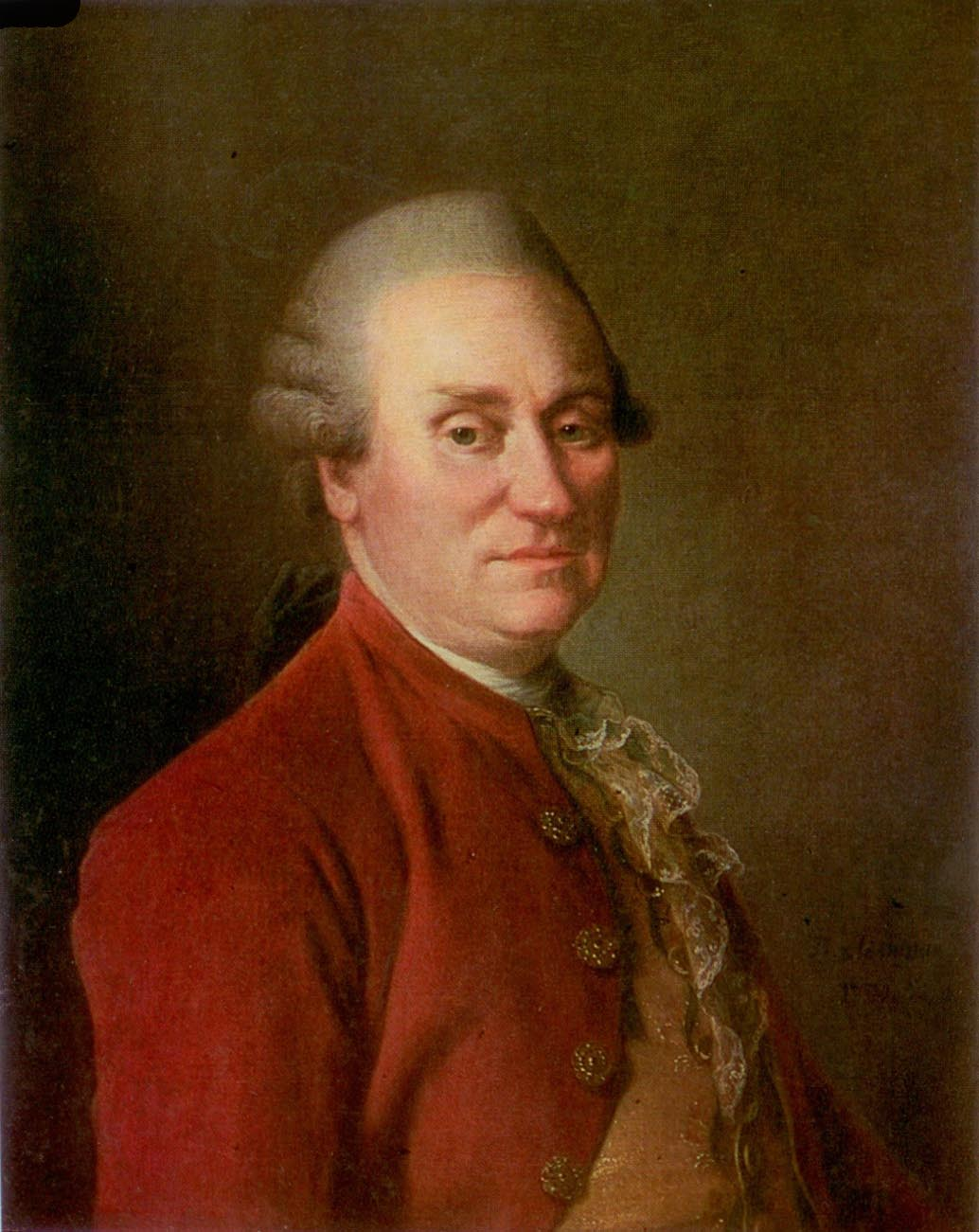
Mark Poltoratsky

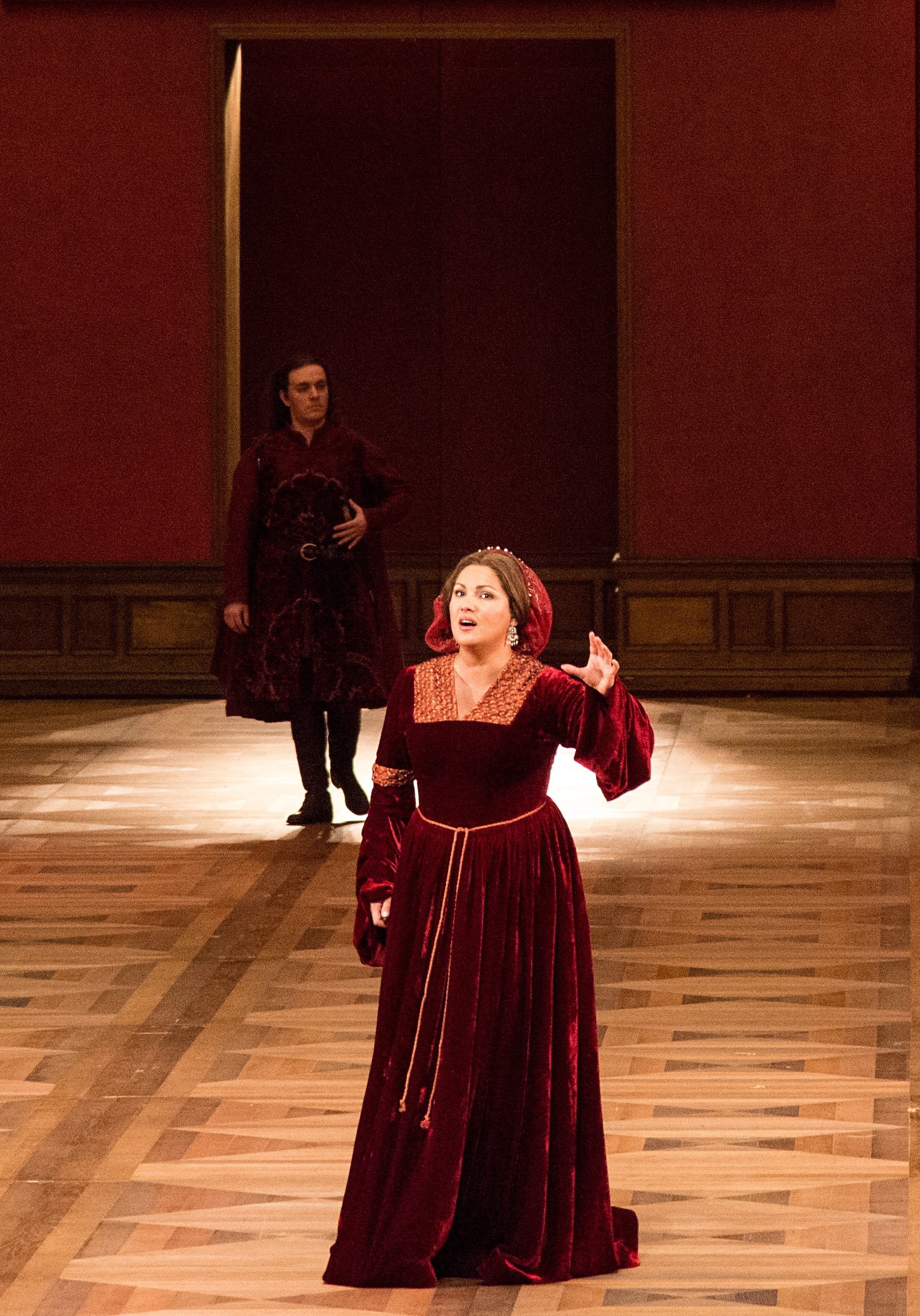
Anna Netrebko

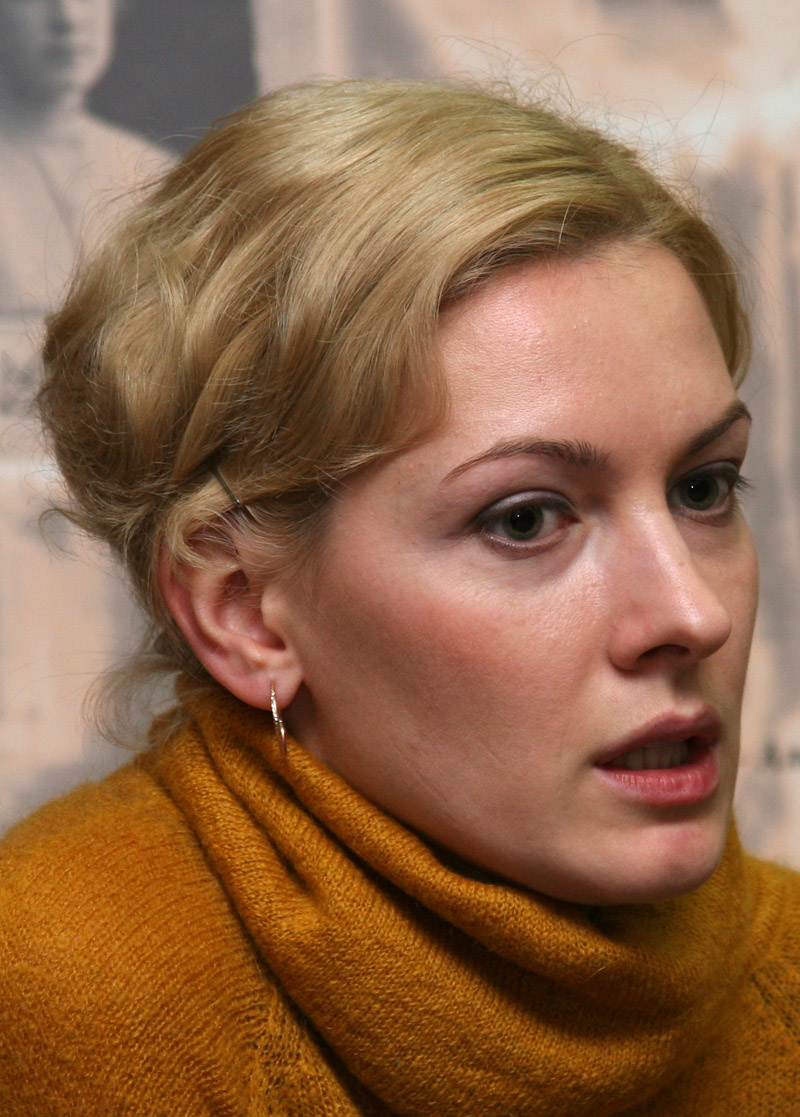
Olga Krasko

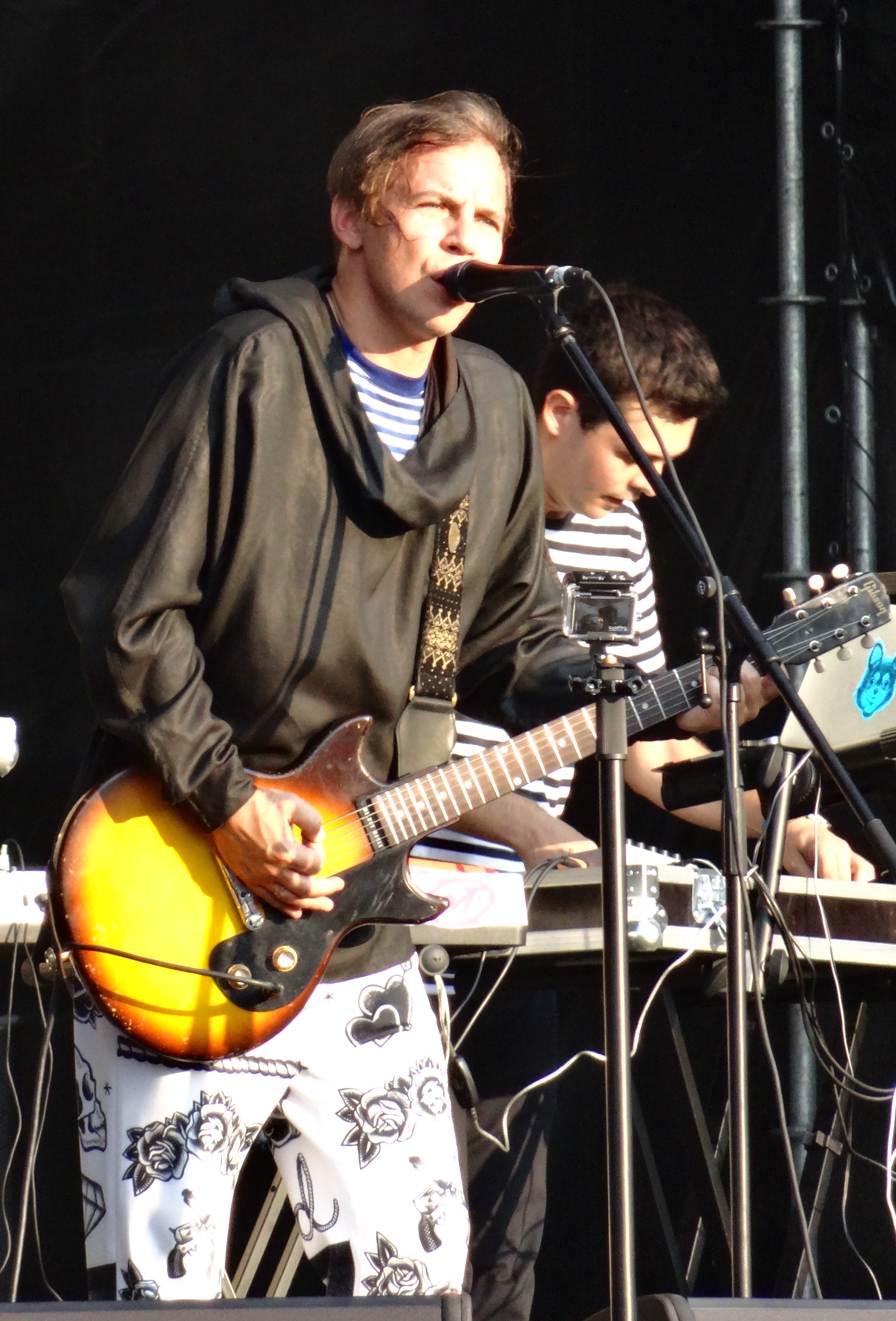
Ilya Lagutenko

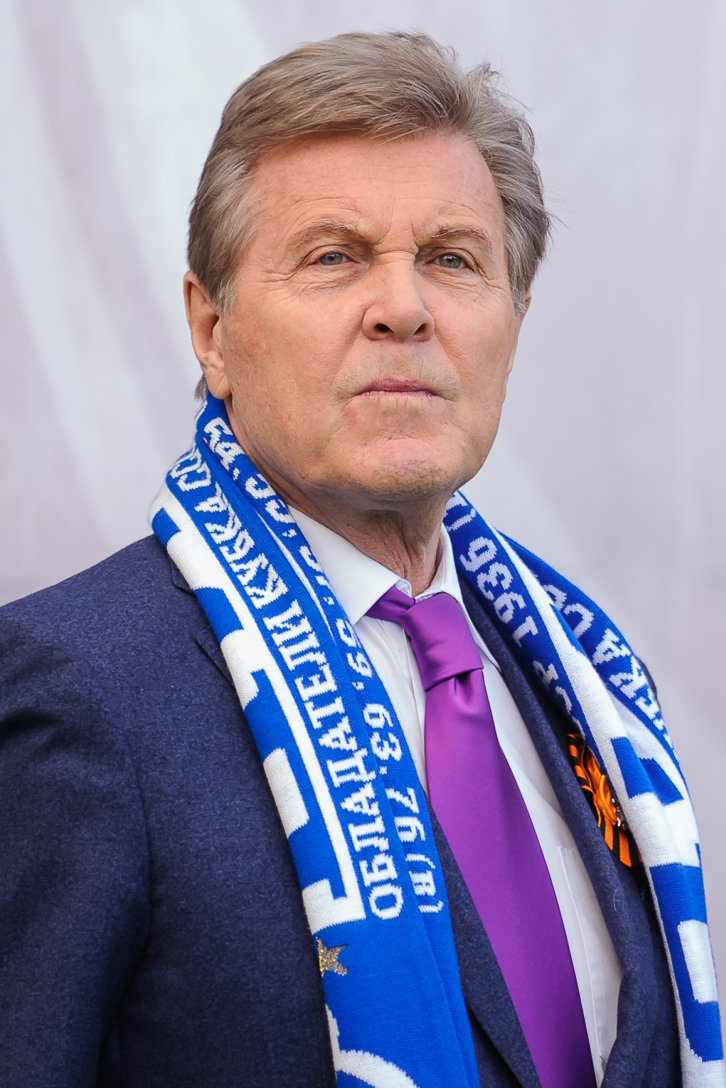
Lev Leshchenko

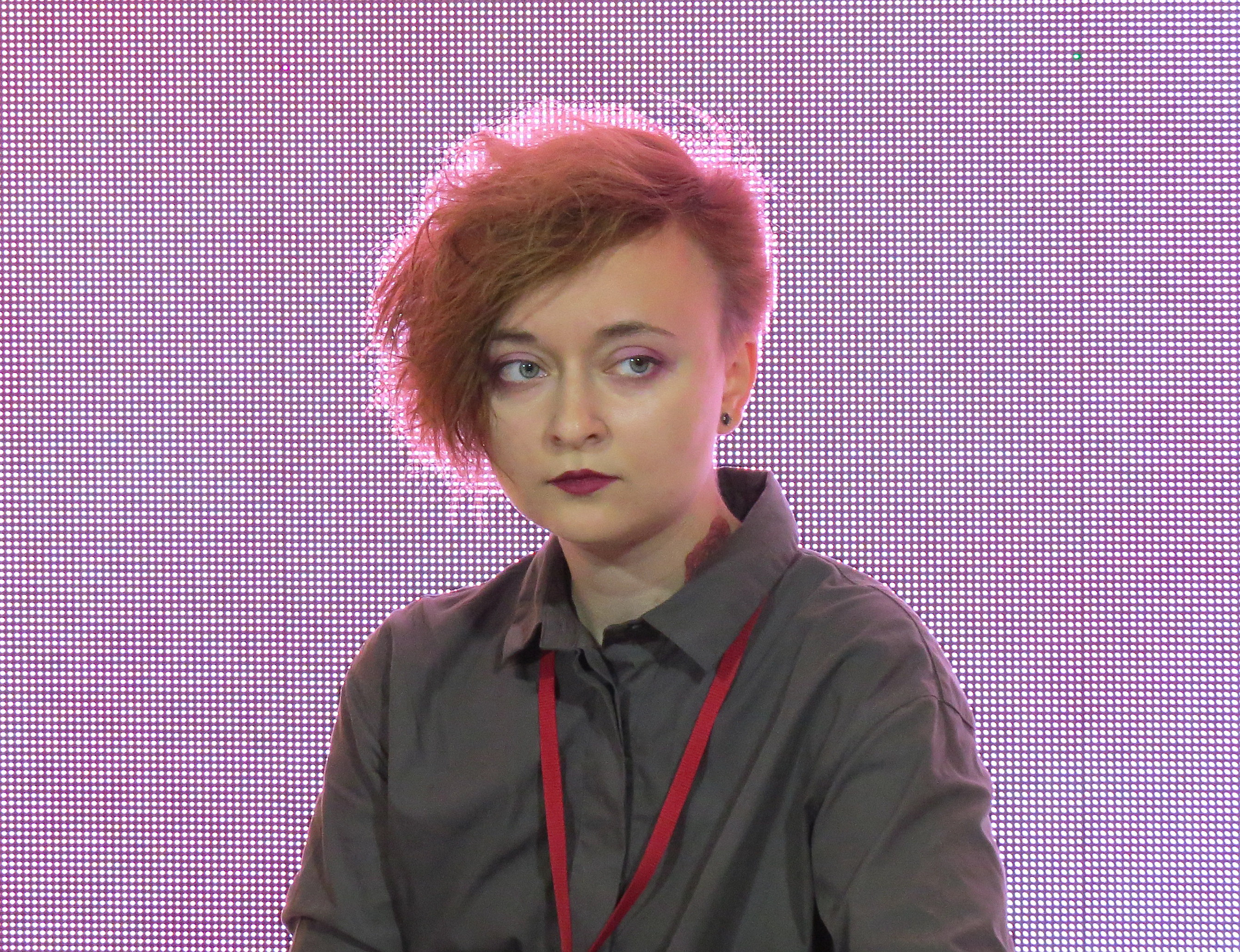
Daria Serenko

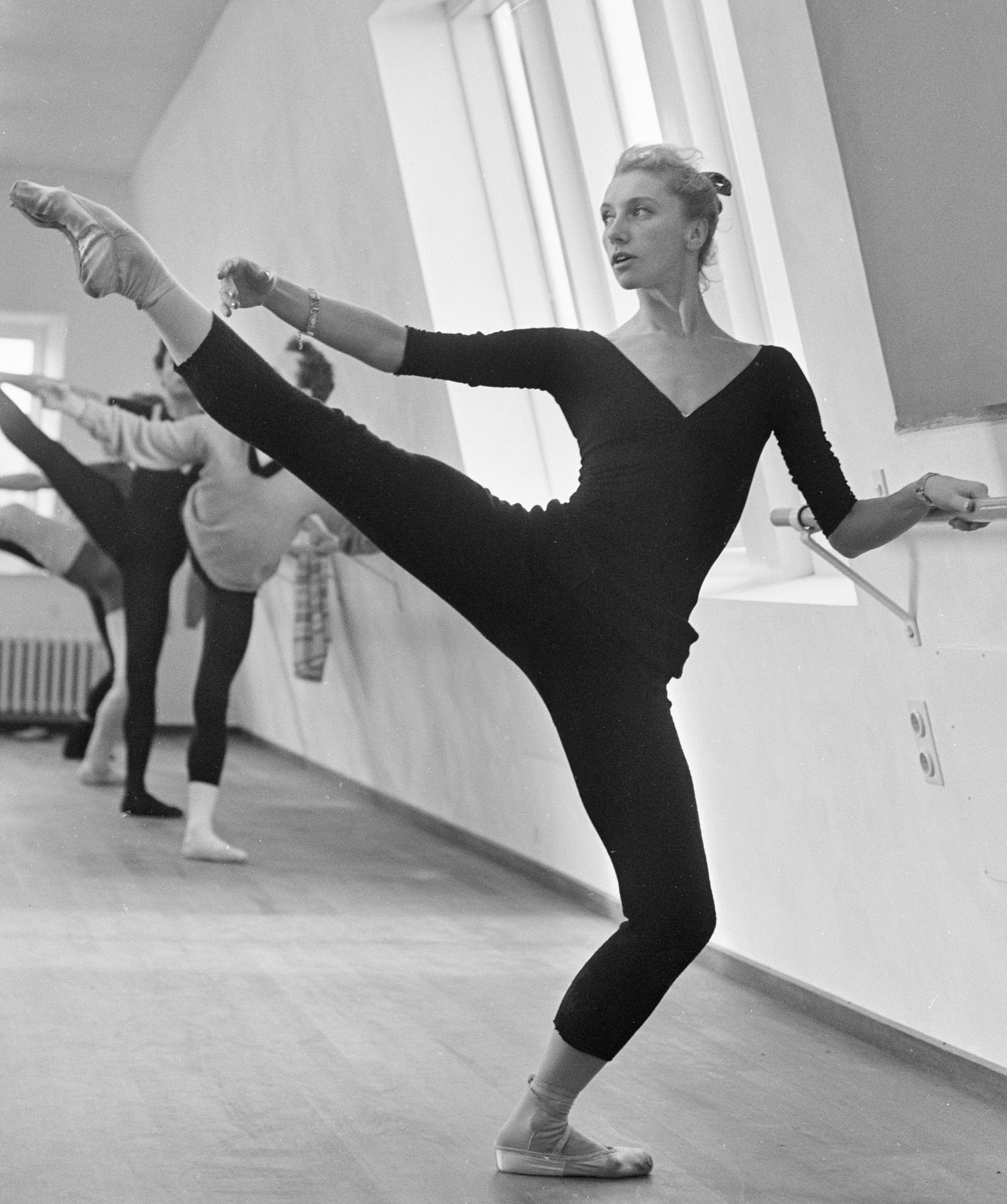
Alla Osipenko

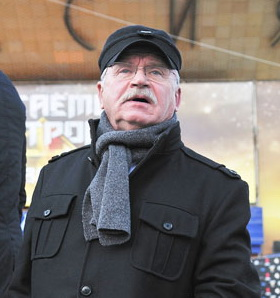
Sergei Nikonenko

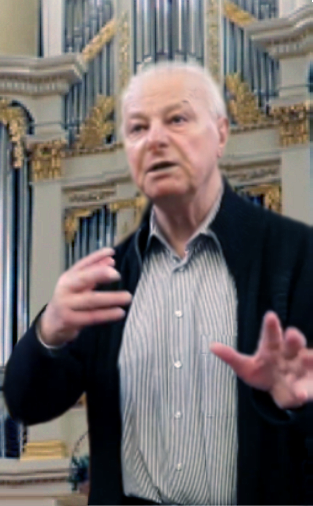
Vladislav Chernushenko

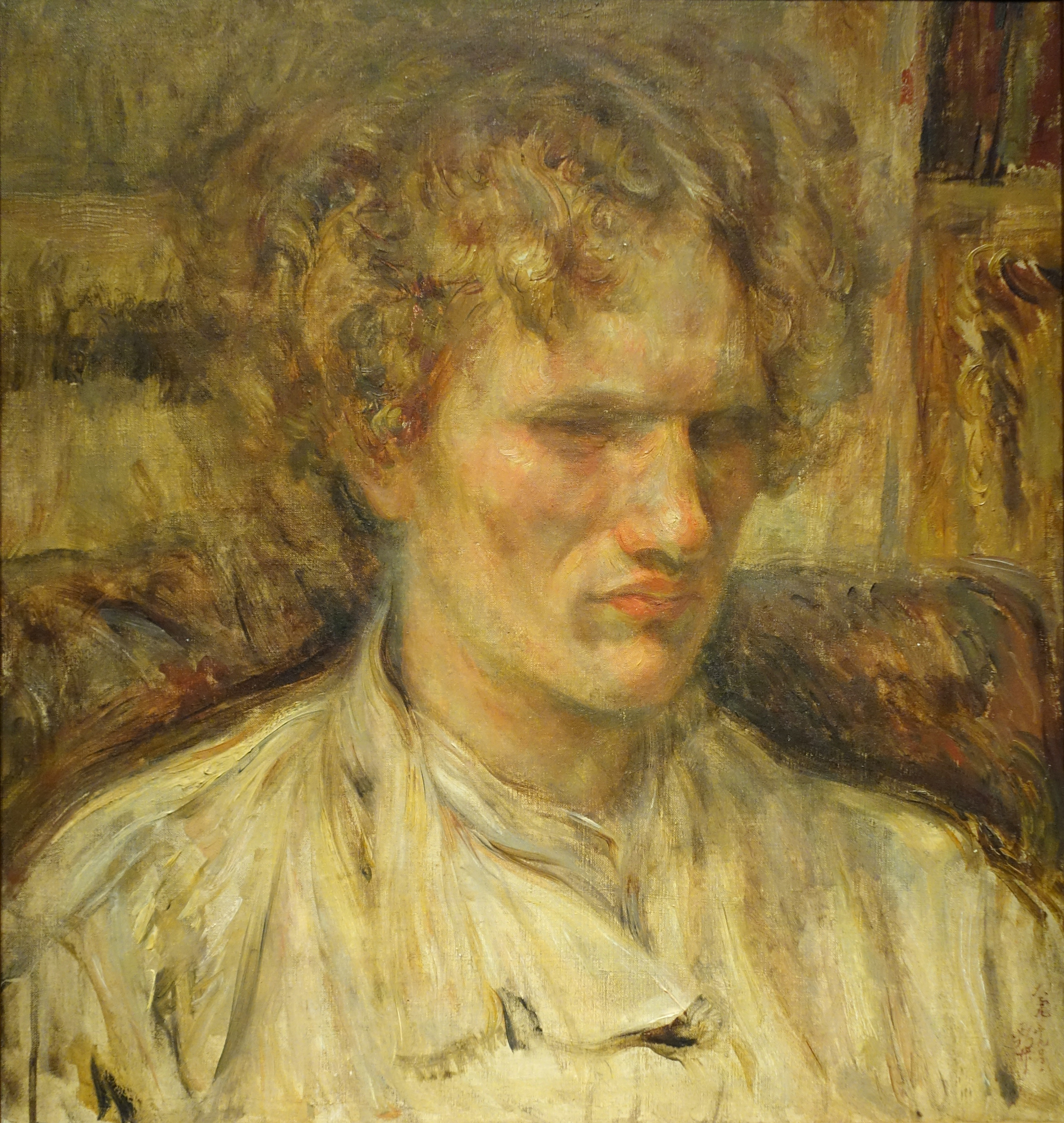
Vasili Eroshenko

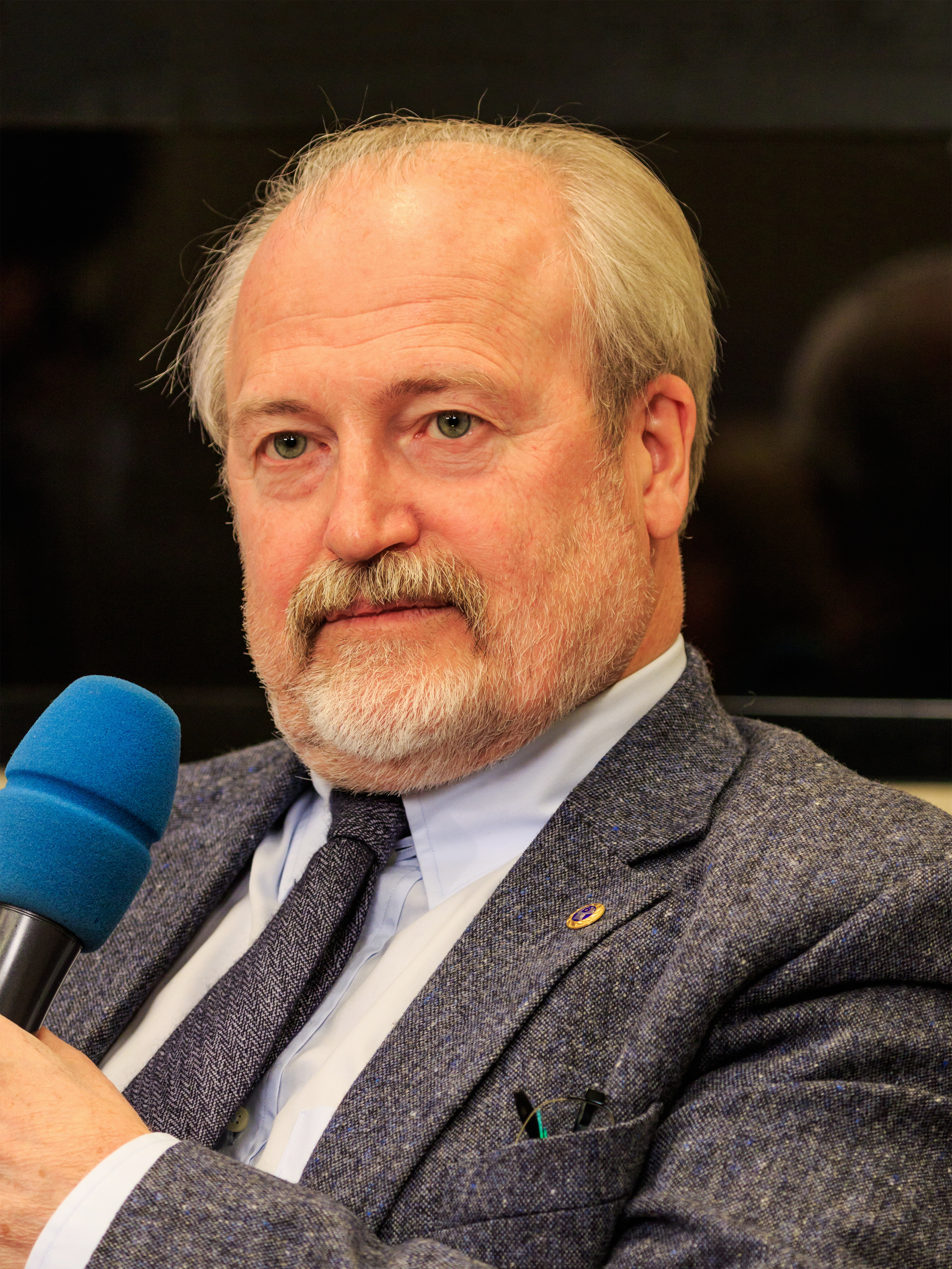
Vladimir Khotinenko

=== Culture ===
- Anna Akhmatova (Gorenko) – poet, nominated for the Nobel Prize in Literature in 1965 and 1966
- Grigory Alchevsky – composer
- Anna Alchuk – poet
- Nikolay Andreyevich Storozhenko – painter
- Sergey Andreyevsky – writer, poet, and literary critic
- Mykhailo Andriienko-Nechytailo – Modernist painter and stage designer
- Yurii Andruzky – poet
- Vladislav Anisovich – Soviet painter and art educator, who lived and worked in Leningrad, a member of the Leningrad Union of Soviet Artists, professor of the Repin Institute of Arts, regarded as one of representatives of the Leningrad School of Painting
- Darya Antonyuk – singer
- Alexander Archipenko – avant-garde artist, sculptor, and graphic artist
- Anna Asti – singer
- Vasily Avchenko – writer and journalist
- Viktor Avdyushko – Soviet actor and a People's Artist of the Russian SFSR
- Arkady Averchenko – playwright and satirist
- Vasily Avseenko – literary critic, writer, and journalist
- Gavriil Baranovsky – architect, civil engineer, art historian and publisher, who worked primarily in Saint Petersburg for the Elisseeff family, but also practiced in Moscow and produced the first town plan for Murmansk (then Romanov-na-Murmane)
- Basta (Vasiliy Vakulenko) – rapper, producer and radio host
- Dmitry Belosselskiy – singer
- Maxim Berezovsky – composer
- Dmitry Bezperchy – painter
- Halyna Bezruk – actress and singer
- Aleksei Bibik – novelist and poet
- Ippolit Bogdanovich – Russian classicist author of light poetry
- Fyodor Bondarchuk – film director
- Natalya Bondarchuk – actress and film director
- Sergei Bondarchuk – actor and film director
- Ilya Bondarenko – architect
- Andrey Boreyko – conductor
- Vladimir Borovikovsky – painter
- Vlada Borovko – operatic soprano
- Vladimir Bortko – film director
- Mykhailo Boychuk – painter, most commonly known as a monumentalist
- Leonid Brailovsky – painter
- Vera Brezhneva (Halushka) – singer
- Vera Broido – writer
- Kir Bulychev (Igor Mozheiko) – Soviet science fiction writer, critic, translator and historian
- Viktor Burduk – artist
- Vladimir Burich – poet
- David Burliuk – poet and painter, often described as "the father of Russian Futurism"
- Wladimir Burliuk – avant-garde artist, Cubo-futurist
- Oleg Buryan – painter
- Eduard Butenko (1941–2006) – Russian actor and theatre director
- Albert Chernenko – philosopher, best known for his innovations in the field of social and legal philosophy
- Vladislav Chernushenko – conductor, who was a People's Artist of the USSR and State Prize laureate
- Illya Chichkan – artist
- Oleg Chilap – rock musician, poet and writer, the leader of Optimalniy Variant band
- Oles Chishko – Soviet composer and singer (tenor)
- Grigory Chukhray – Soviet film director
- Pavel Chukhray – Soviet film director
- Korney Chukovsky – poet
- Ada Chumachenko – poet
- Alisa Chumachenko – entrepreneur.
- Michał Czajkowski – writer
- Grigory Danilevsky – writer, historical novelist, and Privy Councillor of Russia
- Alexander Davidenko – Soviet composer
- Victoria Dayneko – singer, songwriter, and actress
- Bohdan Dedyckiy – writer, poet and journalist
- Nikolai Demidenko – classical pianist
- Vanya Dmitrienko – singer
- Sergey Dorenko – Russian TV and radio journalist, hosted a weekly news commentary program 1999–2000
- Igor Dotsenko – Soviet and Russian drummer, member of the famous rock groups Sinyaya Ptitsa, DDT, and Chizh & Co
- Viktor Dotsenko – author
- Alexander Dovzhenko – film director
- Arkadii Dragomoshchenko – poet, writer, translator, and lecturer
- Natalia Dudinskaya – prima ballerina who dominated the Kirov Ballet from the 1930s through the 1950s
- Maryna and Serhiy Dyachenko – fantasy authors
- Natalia Ermolenko-Yuzhina – opera singer (soprano)
- Vasili Eroshenko – anarchist writer, esperantist, linguist, and teacher
- Pyotr Evdoshenko – poet
- Vladislava Evtushenko – actress, dancer, model and beauty pageant titleholder
- Sogdiana Fedorinskaya – singer and actress
- Fyodor Fedorovsky – Soviet stage designer, People's Artist of the USSR (1951), and active member of the Soviet Academy of Arts (1947; in 1947–1953 – academy's vice president), author of Kremlin stars
- Aleksandr Filippenko – actor, People's Artist of Russia (2000)
- Georges Florovsky – Orthodox priest, theologian, and historian
- Nikolai Fomenko – rock musician and motor racer
- Eugenia Gabrieluk – pianist
- Leonid Gaidai – film director
- Fedor Glushchenko – conductor and violinist
- Sergei Glushko – actor, singer and fitness model, husband of Natasha Korolyova
- Nikolay Gnedich – poet and translator
- Tatiana Gnedich – translator
- Alexander Gnylytsky – artist
- Nikolai Gogol – writer
- Vasili Gogol-Yanovsky – author of a number of theater pieces
- Sergej Mironović Golovčenko – writer and illustrator
- Tatiana Gorb – Soviet painter, graphic artist, art teacher and illustrator
- Vladimir Gorb – Soviet painter, graphic artist, and art teacher
- Stanislav Gorkovenko – Soviet conductor
- Ruslan Gorobets – music composer, singer and arranger
- Yevgeny Grebyonka – romantic prose writer, poet, and philanthropist
- Mitrofan Grekov (Martyshchenko) – Soviet painter
- Alexis Gritchenko – painter
- Nikolai Gritsenko – theater and film actor
- Nikolay Gritsenko – painter
- Nikolai Gubenko – Soviet and Russian actor, film and theatre director, screenwriter, founder of the Community of Taganka Actors theatre, People's Artist of the RSFSR
- Mikhail Gulko – author and performer of Russian chanson
- Lyudmila Gurchenko – popular Soviet and Russian actress, singer and entertainer. People's Artist of the USSR (1983)
- Sergei Gurzo – stage and film actor
- Alexander Hmelnitsky – pianist
- Alla Horska – monumentalist painter, one of the first representatives of the underground art movement
- Aleksandr Ivanchenko – writer
- Maxim Kalashnikov (Vladimir Kurchenko) – writer, publicist and political activist
- Alexander Kaminsky – Russian Imperial architect
- Vera Kamsha – author of high fantasy and journalist
- Vasily Kapnist – poet and playwright
- Oleg Karavaychuk – Soviet and Russian composer, author of music for many films and theater performances
- Evgeny Karnovich – writer, historian, journalist and editor
- Andrey Kavun – film director and screenwriter
- Vadim Kazachenko – Soviet singer
- Yury Kharchenko – artist
- Alexander Khmelik – screenwriter, playwright and director known for his creation of the children's sketch series Yeralash
- Vladimir Khotinenko – film director
- Alexei Khvostenko – avant-garde poet, singer-songwriter and artist
- Yevgeny Kibkalo – baritone, People's Artist of the RSFSR
- Valeri Kikta – classical composer, professor of the Moscow Conservatory
- Maximilian Kirienko-Voloshin – poet
- Katya Kischuk – singer, blogger, songwriter, and former member of the group Serebro
- Dmitri Kitayenko – conductor
- Aleksey Kivshenko – painter
- Kizaru (Oleg Nechiporenko) – rapper and singer-songwriter
- Viktor Klimenko – singer
- Yuri Klimenko – Soviet and Russian cinematographer and photographer
- Ilya Klyachko – pianist and piano teacher, professor of Moscow Conservatory
- Boris Kochno – poet
- Fyodor Petrovich Komissarzhevsky – opera singer and teacher of voice and stagecraft, leading tenor at the Mariinsky Theatre in St. Petersburg
- Anatoly Konenko – microminiature painter and sculptor
- Arseny Koreshchenko – pianist and composer of classical music, including operas and ballets
- Andrey Korolchuk – Soviet painter, graphic artist, printmaker, book artist, teacher
- Vladimir Korolenko – writer
- Natasha Korolyova (Porivay) – singer
- Alexander Korotich – artist, designer, writer and teacher
- Vitaly Korotich – writer and journalist
- Viktor Kosenko – composer, pianist, and educator
- Elena Kostenko – Soviet painter
- Yury Koval – author, artist, and screenplay writer
- Andrey Kovalchuk – sculptor
- Anna Kovalchuk – actress known for her roles in film, television, and theater
- Georgy Kovenchuk – artist and writer
- Emanuel Kozačinski – writer, pedagogue, actor and theater worker
- Ivan Kozlovsky – lyric tenor, long-time teacher at the Moscow Conservatory
- Mari Kraimbrery – singer, songwriter, and record producer
- Aleksei Kravchenko – Soviet actor, known for his role in the 1985 film Come and See as a young boy in the resistance army
- Aleksei Ilyich Kravchenko – Soviet painter, illustrator, draughtsman and printmaker
- Boris Kravchenko – composer
- Nicolai Ivanovich Kravchenko – battle painter, journalist and writer
- Andrei Kravchuk – television and film director and screenwriter
- Andrej Krementschouk – photographer
- Igor Krutoy – music composer, performer, producer and musical promoter
- Konstantin Kryzhitsky – landscape painter
- Oleg Kulik – performance artist, sculptor, photographer and curator
- Panteleimon Kulish – writer, critic, poet, folklorist, and translator
- Irina Kupchenko – stage and film actress
- Les Kurbas – Soviet film director
- Natalya Lagoda – singer
- Ilia Lagutenko – musician
- Vitaly Lagutenko – architect
- Tutta Larsen (Tatyana Romanenko) – VJ and TV presenter
- Boris Lavrenko – Soviet realist painter regarded as one of the major representatives of the Leningrad school of painting
- Igor Lazko – pianist
- Yuri Leonidovich Nesterenko – writer and antisexual activist
- Polina Leschenko – musician
- Vladimir Lesevich – philosopher
- Lev Leshchenko – singer
- Pyotr Leshchenko – singer, nicknamed "the king of Russian tango"
- Yaroslav Levchenko – painter
- Dmitry Levitzky – painter
- Valentina Levko – Soviet opera and chamber singer, People's Artist of the RSFSR
- Orest Levytsky – writer
- Eduard Limonov (Savenko) – writer, poet, publicist, dissident and founder of the National Bolshevik Party
- Lydia Lipkowska – Russian operatic soprano
- Alexander Litovchenko – painter
- Svetlana Loboda – singer and composer
- Victoria Lomasko – artist
- Konstantin Lopushansky – Soviet and Russian film director, film theorist and author
- Ani Lorak – singer
- Anton Losenko – neoclassical painter and academician
- George Loukomski – artist, art critic and art historian
- Sergei Lukyanenko – science fiction and fantasy author
- Viktor Lyapkalo – Soviet painter
- Vladimir Makarenko – orientalist, linguist, lexicographer, and translator
- Felix Malyarenko – poet
- Gavriil Malysh – Soviet painter, representative of the Leningrad school of painting
- Anatoly Marchenko – author
- Igor Markevitch – avant-garde composer and conductor
- Ivan Martos – Ukrainian and Russian sculptor and art teacher who helped awaken Russian interest in Neoclassical sculpture
- Gavrilo Martsenkovich – singer
- Igor Matvienko – producer, composer, founder of the bands Lyube, Ivanushki International, Korni, Fabrika, KuBa
- Maybe Baby (Viktoriya Lysyuk) – singer
- Aleksandr Melnik – film director
- Anton Melnik – film producer, known for his work in action movies
- Viktor Merezhko – screenwriter, film director, playwright, actor, writer, TV presenter, People's Artist of the Russian Federation (2014)
- Amvrosy Metlinsky – poet, ethnographer, folklorist and panslavist
- Sergey Migitsko – film and theater actor
- Lolita Milyavskaya – singer, actress, TV and film director
- Roman Miroshnichenko – virtuoso guitarist, composer, and band leader
- Vladimir Mischouk – pianist
- Alexander Mogilevsky – classical concert violinist and director of the Kremlin Band for Nicholas II
- Vadim Mogilnitsky – poet
- Yevsey Moiseyenko – Soviet painter and pedagogue. People's Painter of the USSR (1970) and Hero of Socialist Labour (1986).
- Yuri Moroz – Soviet and Russian film director, actor, scriptwriter, producer
- Pavel Morozenko – Soviet theatre and film actor
- Ivan Mozgovenko – Soviet clarinetist and music teacher
- Nikolai Mukho – Soviet and Russian painter, representative of the Leningrad school of painting
- Lyubov Mulmenko – playwright, film director and screenwriter
- Alexander Murashko – painter
- Yuri Muzychenko – musician and video blogger, a founder of 'The Hatters'
- Vladimir Narbut – poet, member of the Acmeist group
- Vasily Narezhny – writer known for his satirical depiction of provincial mores in the vein of the 18th-century picaresque novel
- Aleksandr Naumenko – singer
- Mike Naumenko – Soviet musician
- Tatyana Nazarenko – Russian contemporary painter
- Pavel Necheporenko – Soviet virtuoso performer of the balalaika
- Vasily Nemirovich-Danchenko – writer and journalist
- Vladimir Nemirovich-Danchenko – playwright and theatre administrator, a founder of the Moscow Art Theatre
- Yevgeny Nesterenko – opera singer
- Anna Netrebko – operatic soprano
- Sergei Nikonenko – Soviet actor, film director, and screenwriter, People's Artist of the RSFSR (1991).
- Petro Nishchynsky – composer
- Andrey Nitchenko – poet
- Dmitry Oboznenko – Soviet Russian painter, graphic artist, Honored Artist of the RSFSR
- Vladimir Orlovsky – painter
- Alla Osipenko – Soviet ballerina
- Nikolai Ostrovsky – socialist realist writer
- Artem Ovcharenko – ballet dancer
- Gennady Ovcharenko – artist
- Tomasz Padura – Romantic poet
- Maria Pakhomenko – Soviet singer
- Nikolai Panchenko – poet
- Sergey Parkhomenko – publisher, journalist and political commentator
- Olga Pashchenko – musician
- Vasily Pashkevich – composer
- Gennady Pasko – impressionist painter
- Grigory Pasko – military journalist
- Konstantin Paustovsky – writer
- Sergei Pavlenko – painter
- Andrew Pavlovsky – artist
- Nikolai Peiko – Soviet composer and professor of composition
- Olga Peretyatko – operatic soprano
- Marian Peretyatkovich – architect
- Mikhail Petrenko – opera singer
- Kirill Petrenko – conductor, chief conductor of the Berlin Philharmonic
- Roman Petrenko – media executive
- Vasily Petrenko – conductor, chief conductor of the Royal Liverpool Philharmonic and Oslo Philharmonic
- Svetlana Petriychuk – playwright, theatre and cinema director, and teacher
- Valentin Pikul – Soviet historical novelist
- Nikolai Pimonenco – painter
- Galina Pisarenko – Soviet soprano
- Józef Płoszko – architect
- Yevhen Pluzhnyk – poet
- Antony Pogorelsky – writer
- Alexander Polishchuk – conductor and Meritorious Artist
- Klym Polishchuk – journalist, poet and writer
- Anna Politkovskaya (Mazepa) – journalist, writer, and human rights activist
- Mark Poltoratsky – Russian Imperial singer (baritone)
- Serge Polyanichko – conductor, horn player and TV presenter
- Anatoly Polyanski – architect
- Ignaty Potapenko – writer and playwright
- Yuri Poteyenko – composer
- Taisia Povaliy – singer and actress
- Anastasia Prikhodko – singer, represented Russia in the Eurovision Song Contest 2009 in Moscow
- Theophan Prokopovich – Russian Imperial Orthodox theologian, writer, poet, mathematician, and philosopher
- Zinaida Pronchenko – film historian, film critic, and journalist
- Maria Protsenko – Soviet architect
- Irina Ratushinskaya – Soviet dissident, poet and writer
- Kliment Red'ko – painter-scientist, avant-garde artist (Constructivist, Projectionist, Suprematist), graphic artist
- Mikhail Reshetnyak – singer, composer and songwriter
- Alexander Rodchenko – Soviet artist, sculptor, photographer, and graphic designer, one of the founders of constructivism
- Nadezhda Ruchka – singer-songwriter, actress, model, and poet, soloist of the pop group Blestyashchiye
- Bela Rudenko – opera singer, music teacher, and professor of the Moscow Conservatory
- Leonid Rudenko – DJ
- Vadim Rudenko – pianist
- Maria Rudnitskaya – Soviet realist painter, graphic artist, and art teacher
- Nikolai Sachenko – violinist
- Vladimir Sakhnenko – painter and ceramist, and a member of the Union of Artists of the USSR since 1967
- Georgy Samchenko – Soviet poet, translator, and literary critic of the 1970s–1990s
- Nikolay Samokish – painter
- Igor Savchenko – screenwriter and film director
- Ivan Savenko – painter, Honored Artist of the RSFSR
- Igor Savitsky – painter, archeologist and collector, especially of avant-garde art
- Ekaterina Scherbachenko – operatic soprano
- Daria Serenko – poet, curator and public artist
- Nikolay Shcherbina – poet
- Larisa Shepitko – film director, screenwriter and actress
- Aleksandr Shevchenko – modernist painter and sculptor
- Taras Shevchenko – poet
- Yuri Shevchuk – Soviet and Russian rock musician and singer/songwriter who leads the rock band DDT
- Evgeny Sheyko – conductor
- Andrey Shibko – pianist
- Vladimir Shileyko – poet
- Mikhail Shuisky – opera and concert singer
- Klavdiya Shulzhenko – Soviet popular singer and actress
- Viktor Shvaiko – artist
- Valery Sigalevitch – pianist
- Alexander Sinchuk – pianist
- Julian Sitkovetsky – Soviet violinist
- Nikolay Sivchuk – bayanist/accordionist
- Aleksandra Skochilenko – painter
- Gregory Skovoroda – writer and philosopher
- Sergei Skripka – Soviet conductor, People's Artist of Russia, conductor of the State Symphony Cinema Orchestra
- Konstantin Sluchevsky – poet
- Alexandra Snezhko-Blotskaya – Soviet animated film director
- Soda Luv (Vladislav Terentyuk) – hip-hop singer, songwriter and rapper
- Fyodor Sologub – Symbolist poet, novelist, playwright and essayist
- Sergey Solomko – painter, watercolorist, illustrator and designer
- Ivan Soshenko – painter
- Ivan Stepanovsky – lutenist
- Anastasia Stotskaya – singer
- Yekaterina Stravinsky (Nosenko) – painter
- Alexandra Strelchenko – actress and singer, People's Artist of the RSFSR
- Vasily Stus – poet
- Rufin Sudkovsky – painter
- Sergei Tarnowsky – Soviet pianist and teacher
- Alexander Tatarenko – painter, restorer, art teacher, and member of the Saint Petersburg Union of Artists
- Ilona Timchenko – pianist and composer
- Oleg Timchenko – contemporary painter and founder of the “10th Floor Group”
- Boris Tishchenko – composer and pianist
- Alexey Titarenko – photographer and artist
- Yevgeny Titarenko – writer
- Bogdan Titomir – musician, rapper and DJ; former member of the duo 'Car-Man'
- Leonid Tkachenko – artist
- Regina Todorenko – pop-singer and television presenter, member of the Russian show Voice
- Aleksandr Tsekalo – musician, actor, radio and TV host, founder of production company Sreda
- Eldzhey (Alexey Uzenyuk) – rapper and songwriter
- Ivan Vasilenko – Soviet writer of children's books.
- Sergei Vasilenko – Soviet composer
- Serhii Vasylkivsky – artist
- Anton Vasyutinsky – painter, designer of coins and medals, professor of Imperial Academy of Arts in Saint Petersburg
- Vasily Velichko – poet, playwright and publicist
- Anastasiya Vertinskaya – Soviet and Russian actress (Scarlet Sails, Amphibian Man and Grigori Kozintsev's Hamlet)
- Alexander Vertinsky – artist, poet, singer, composer, cabaret artist and actor
- Roman Viktyuk – theatre director, actor, and screenwriter
- Boris Vladimirski – Soviet painter of the Socialist Realism school
- Lev Vlassenko – Soviet pianist and teacher
- Natasha Vlassenko – pianist and teacher
- Mikhail Voskresensky – pianist
- Sacha Votichenko – musician of the tympanon
- Tetyana Yablonska – painter
- Nikolai Yaroshenko – painter
- Sasha Yevtushenko – director and producer for BBC Radio
- Yevgeny Yevtushenko – poet
- Yolka – singer
- Pamfil Yurkevich – idealist philosopher and teacher
- Irina Zabiyaka – singer and lead vocalist, songwriter in the popular Russian group Chi-Li (Russian: Чи-Ли)
- Lyubov Zakharchenko – poet and singer-songwriter
- Ivan Zarudny – Baroque wood-carver and icon-painter
- Sergey Zaryanko – portrait painter and art teacher
- Vsevolod Zelchenko – poet
- Alexander Zelenko – architect
- Victor Zinchuk – guitar virtuoso, composer, arranger, Honored Artist of Russia in 2005
- Mikhail Zoshchenko – writer
- Grigori Zozulya – artist

=== Sports ===
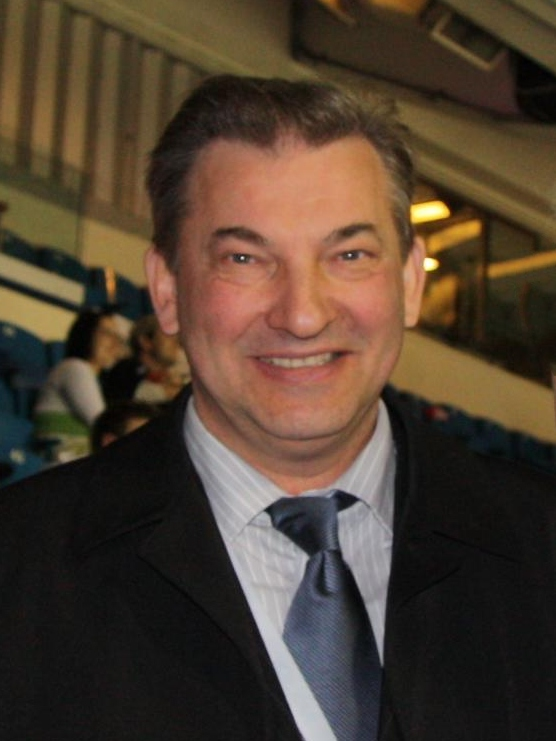
Vladislav Tretiak

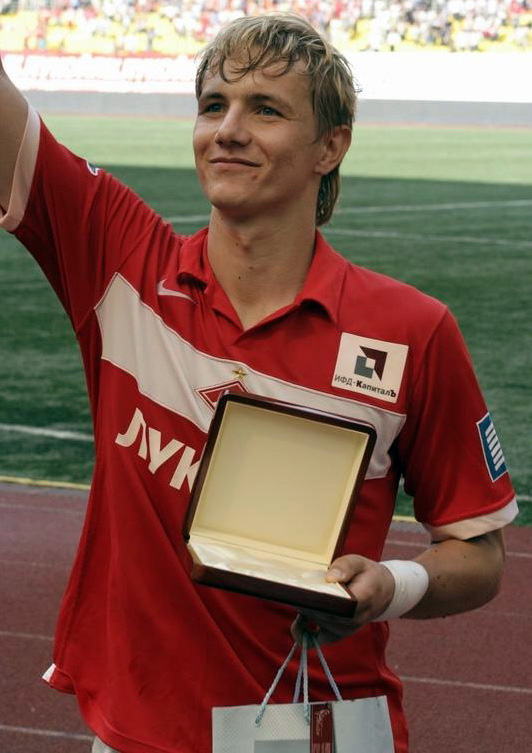
Roman Pavlyuchenko

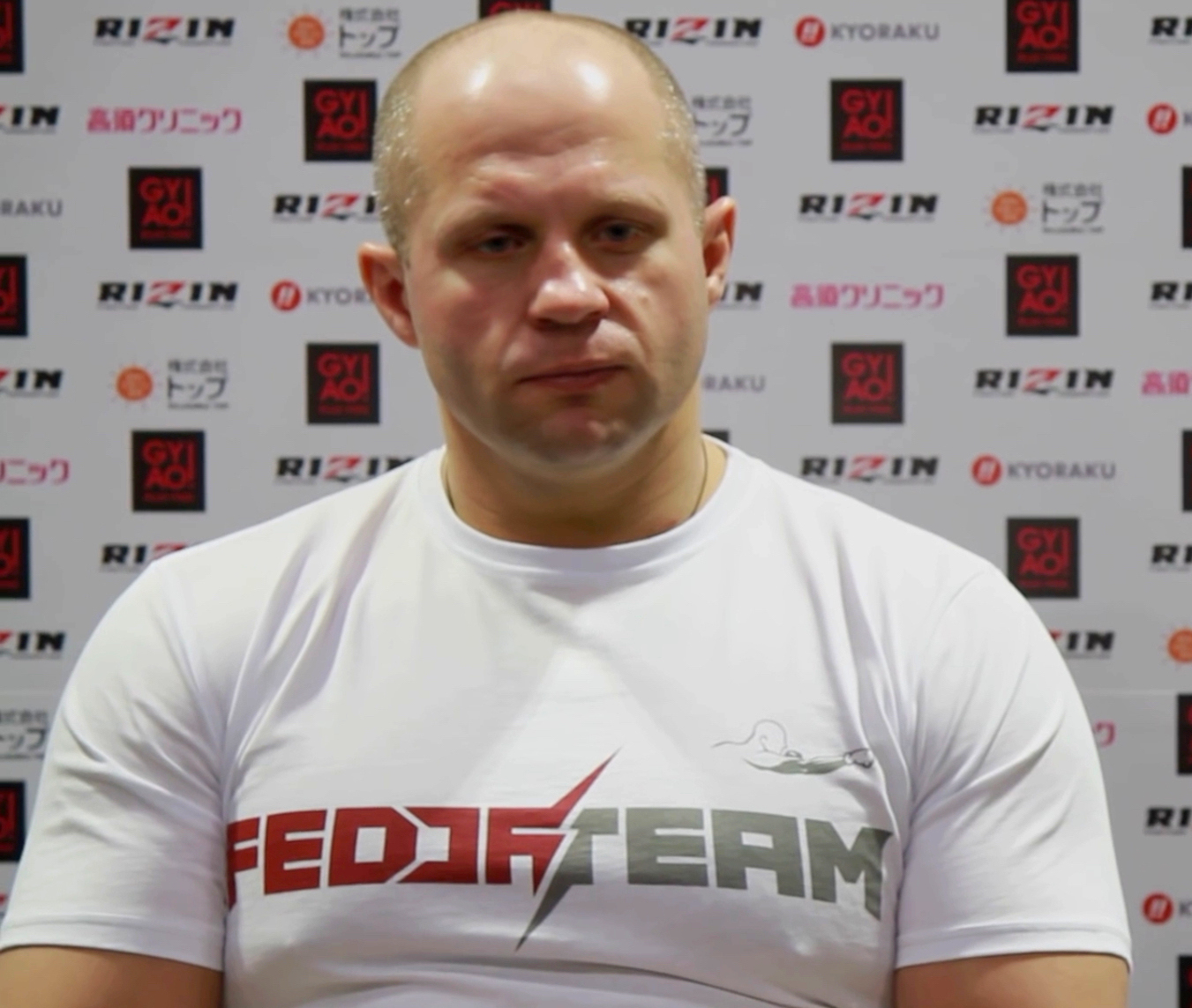
Fedor Emelianenko

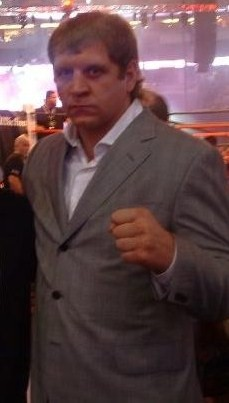
Alexander Emelianenko

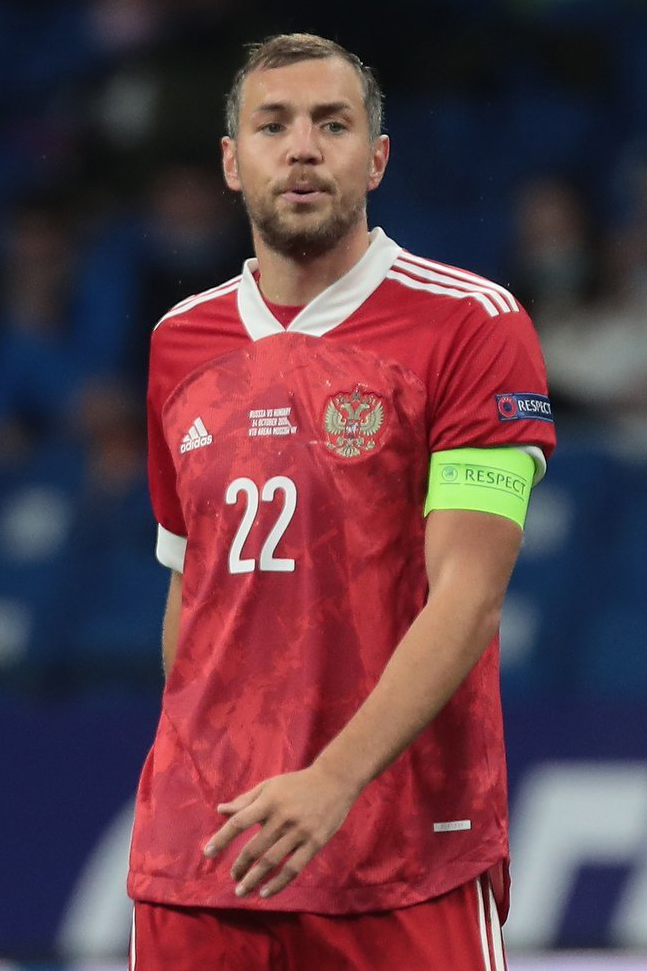
Artem Dzyuba

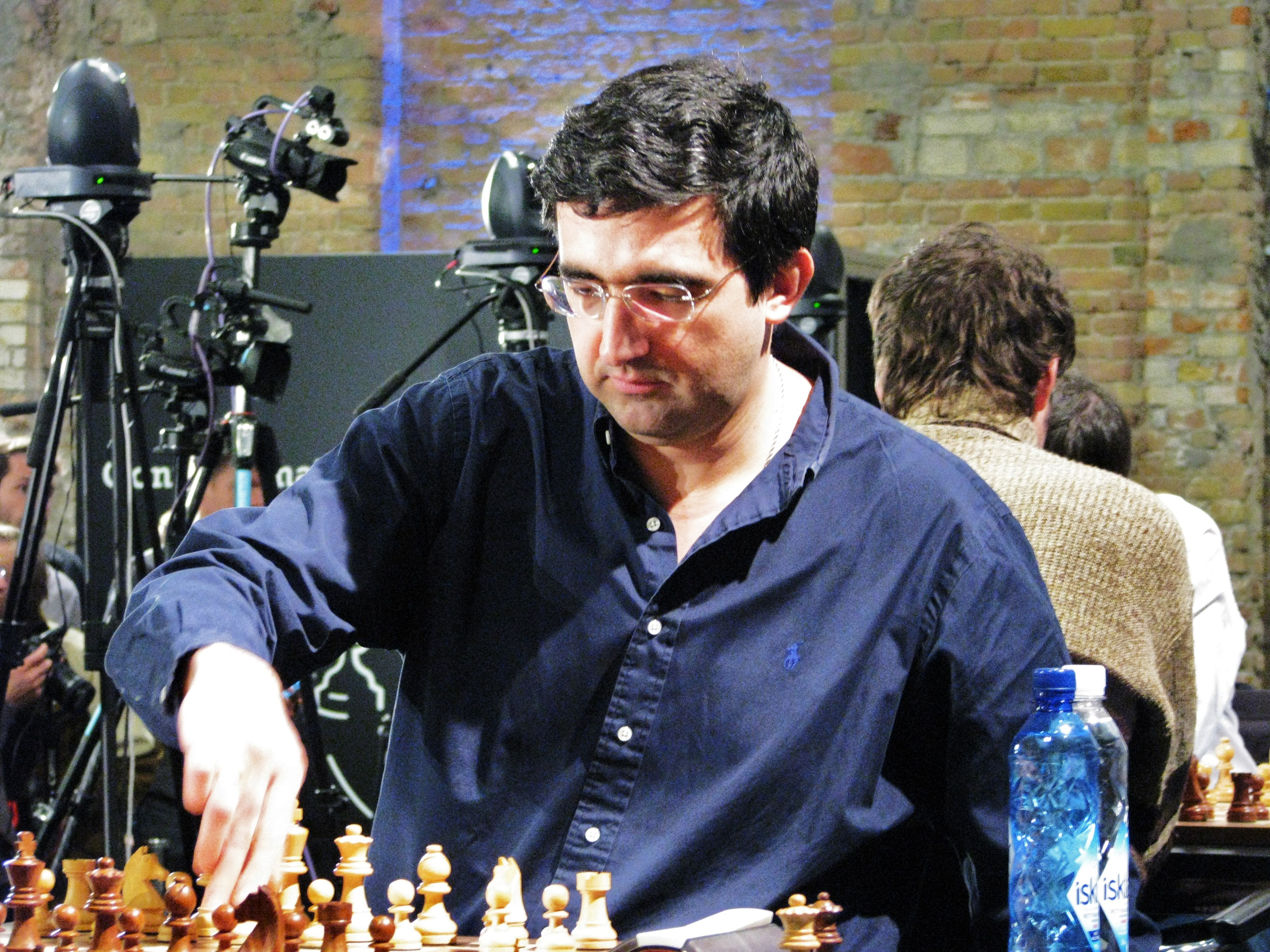
Vladimir Kramnik

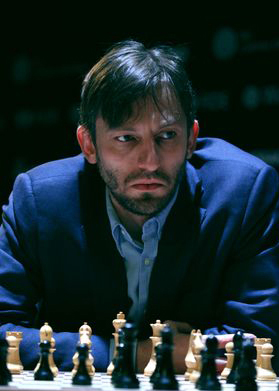
Alexander Grischuk

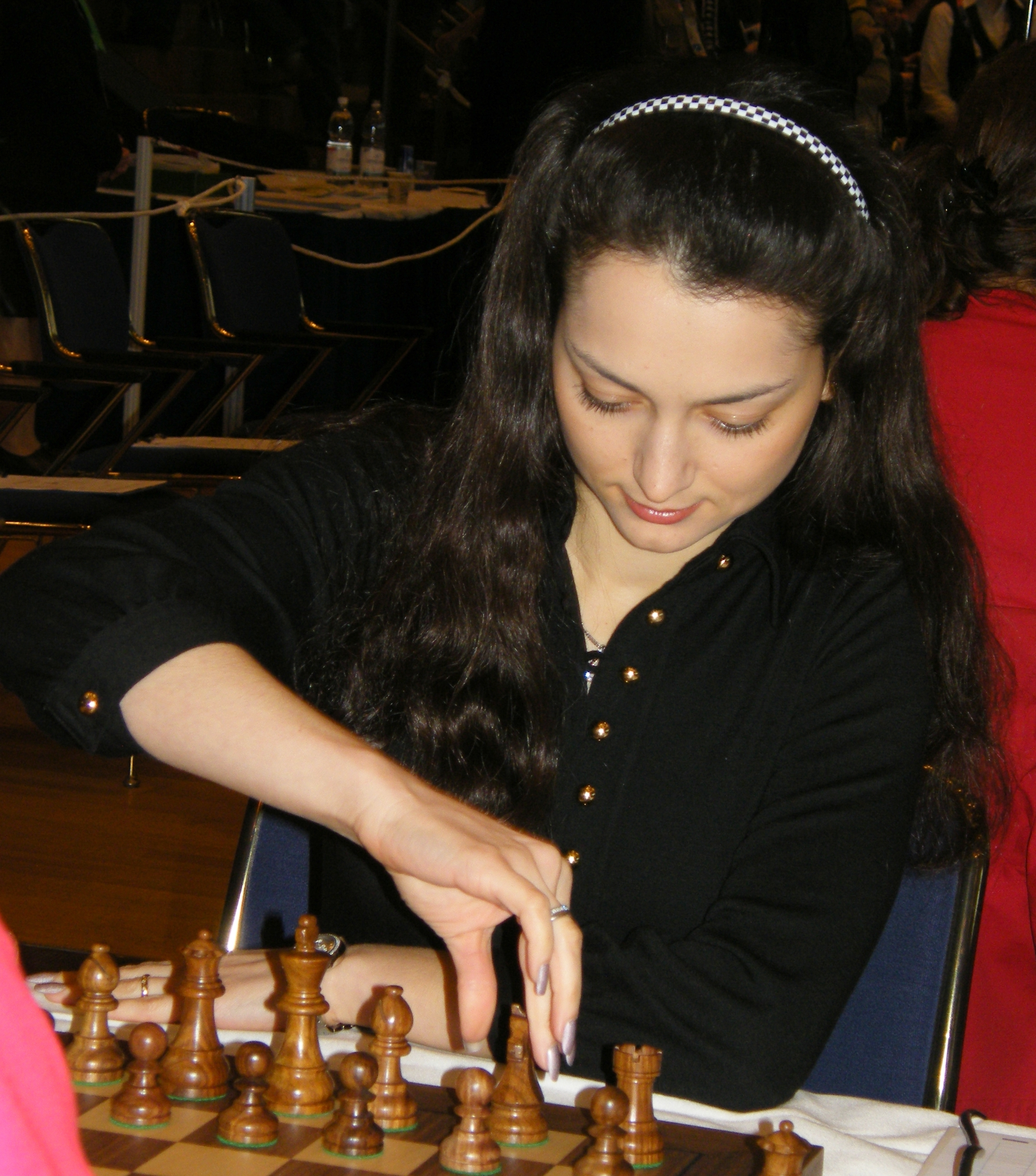
Alexandra Kosteniuk

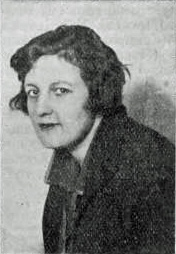
Lyudmila Rudenko

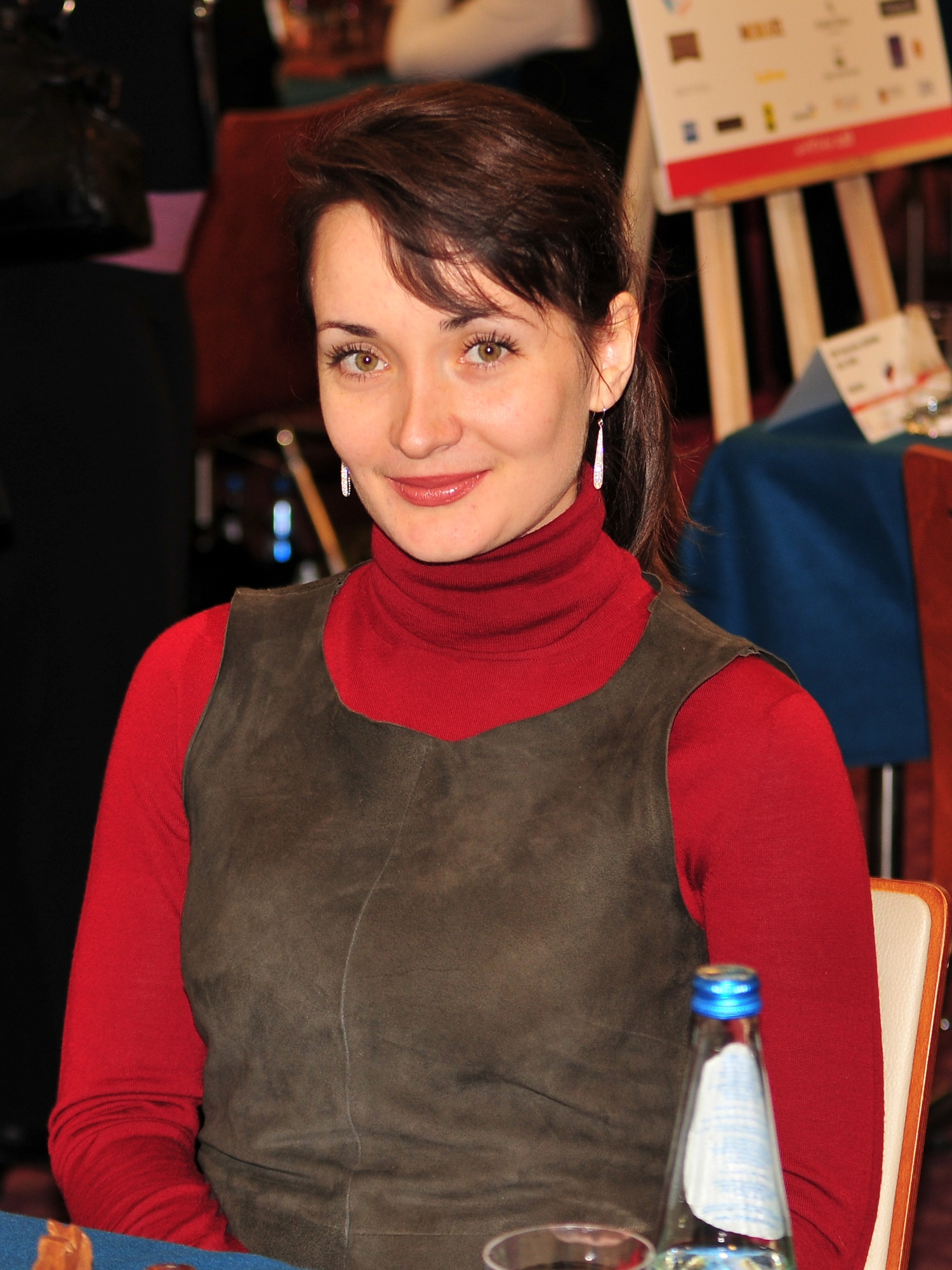
Kateryna Lagno

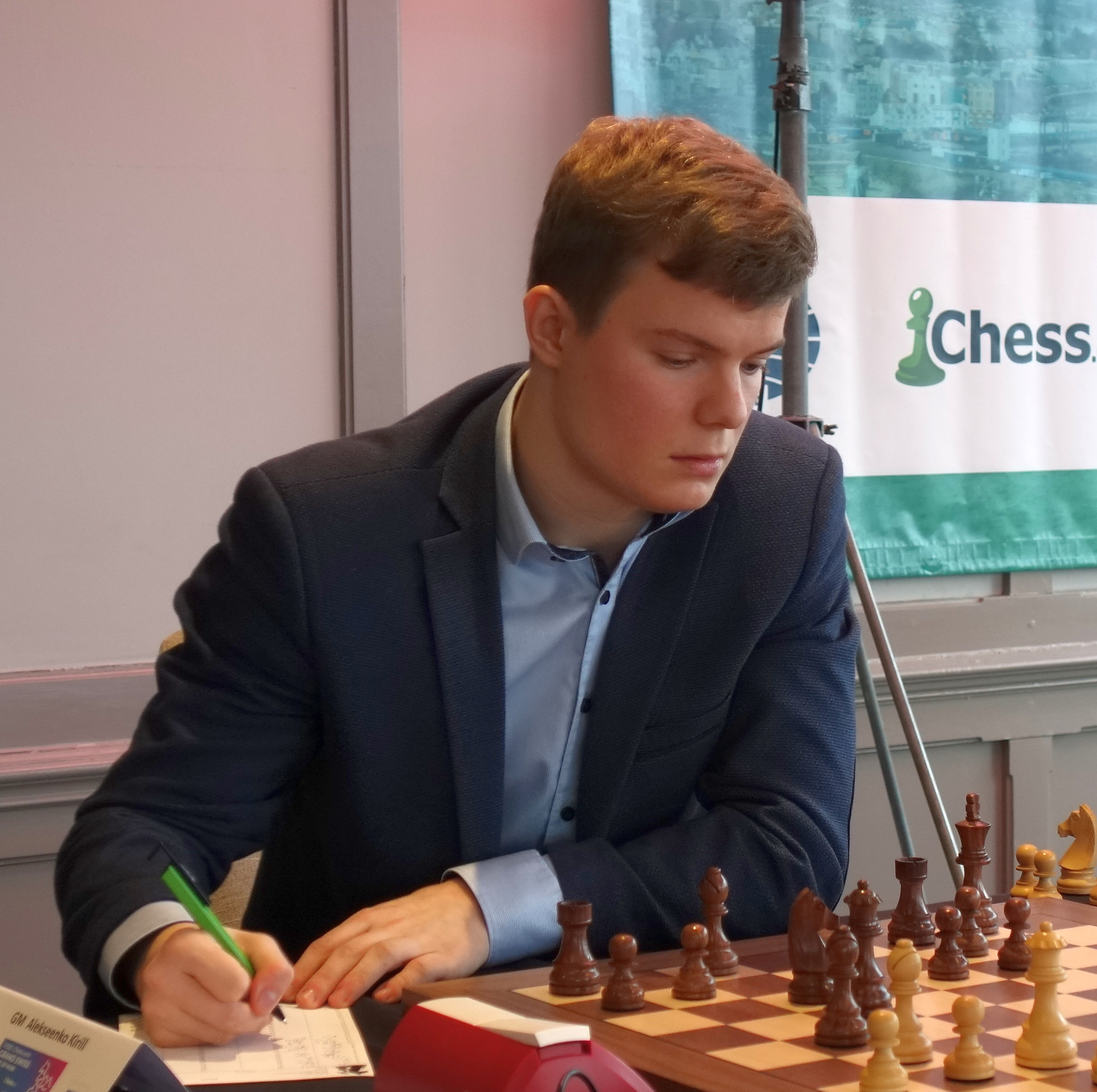
Kirill Alekseenko

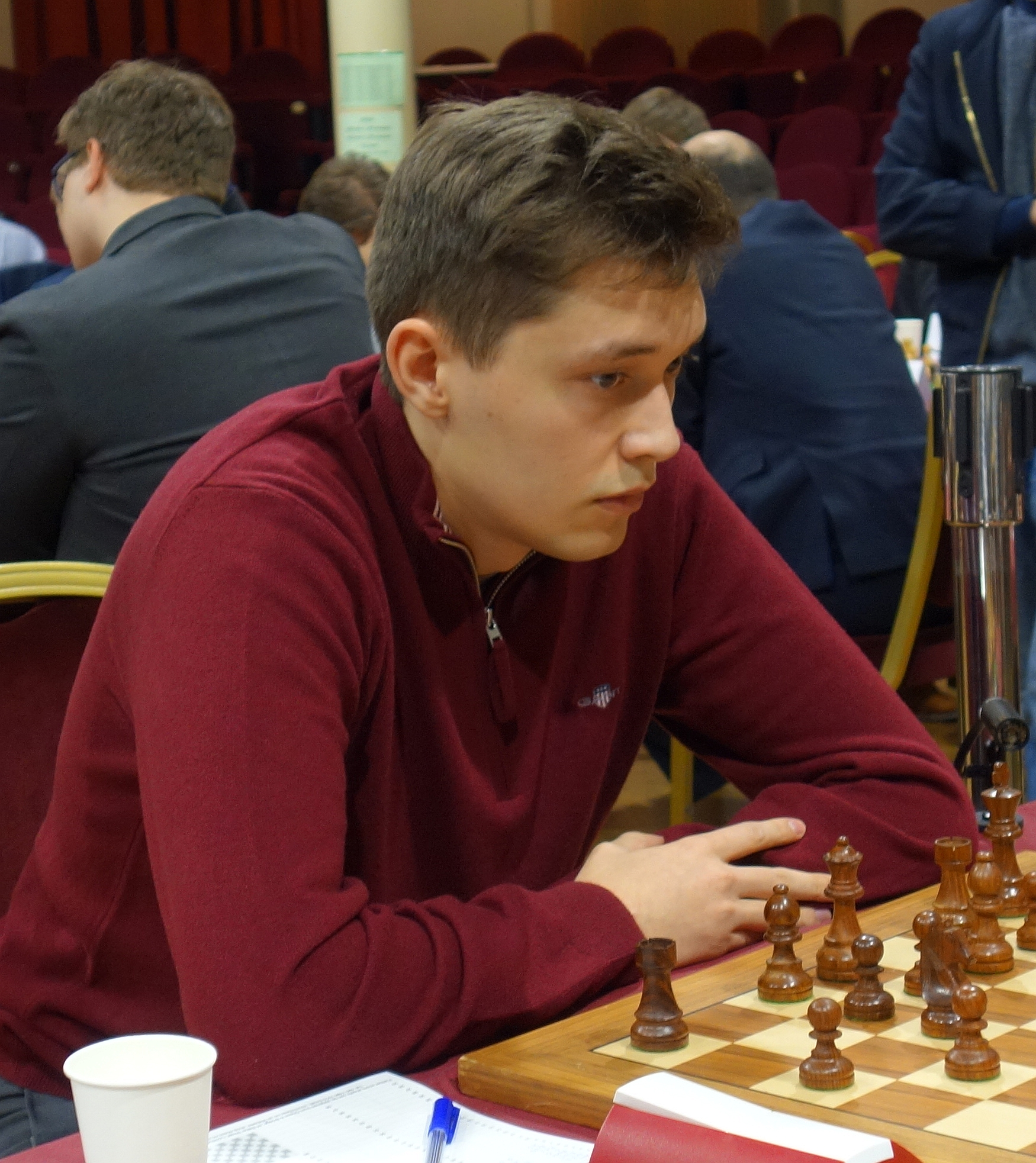
Andrey Esipenko

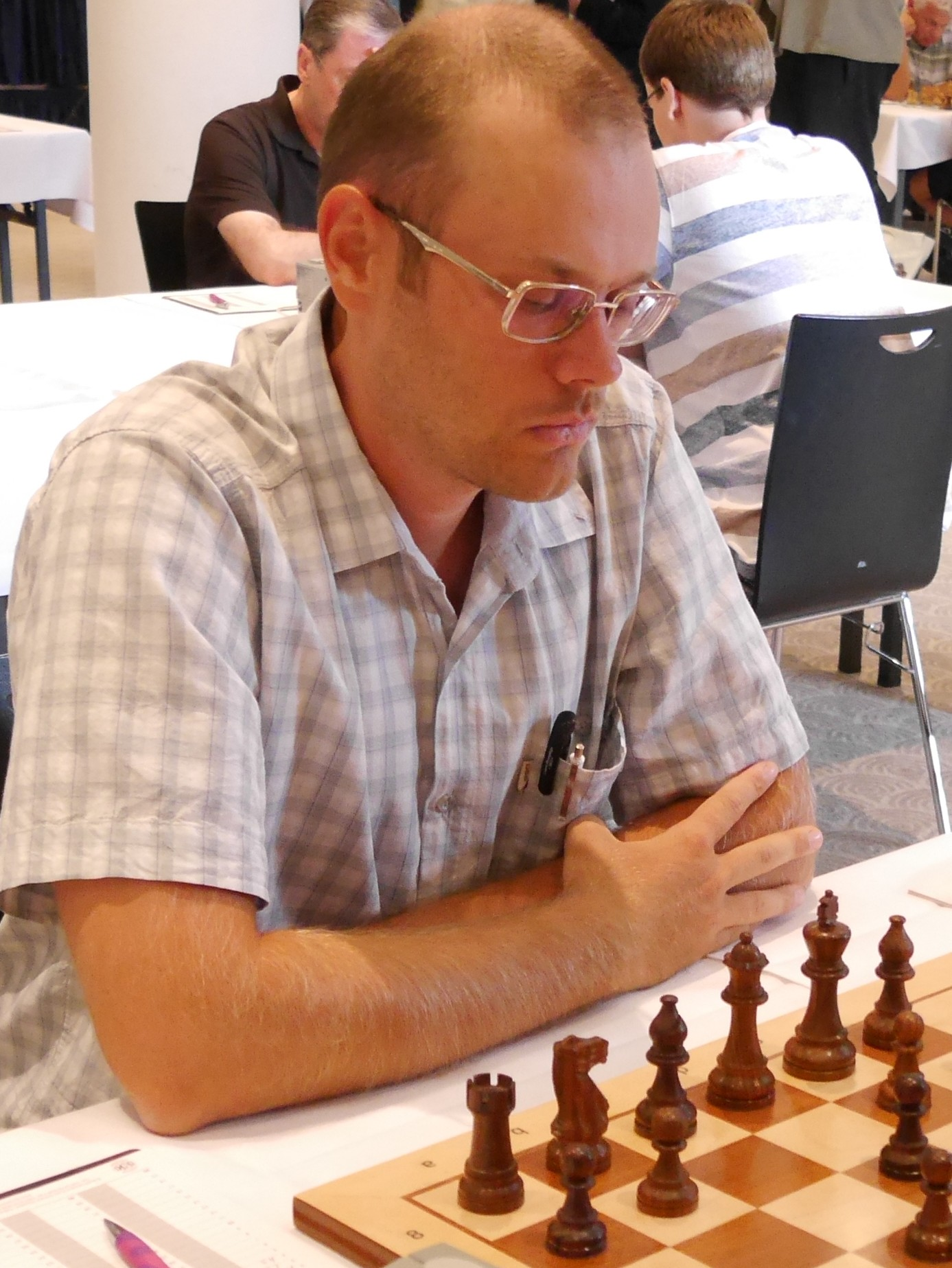
Anton Demchenko

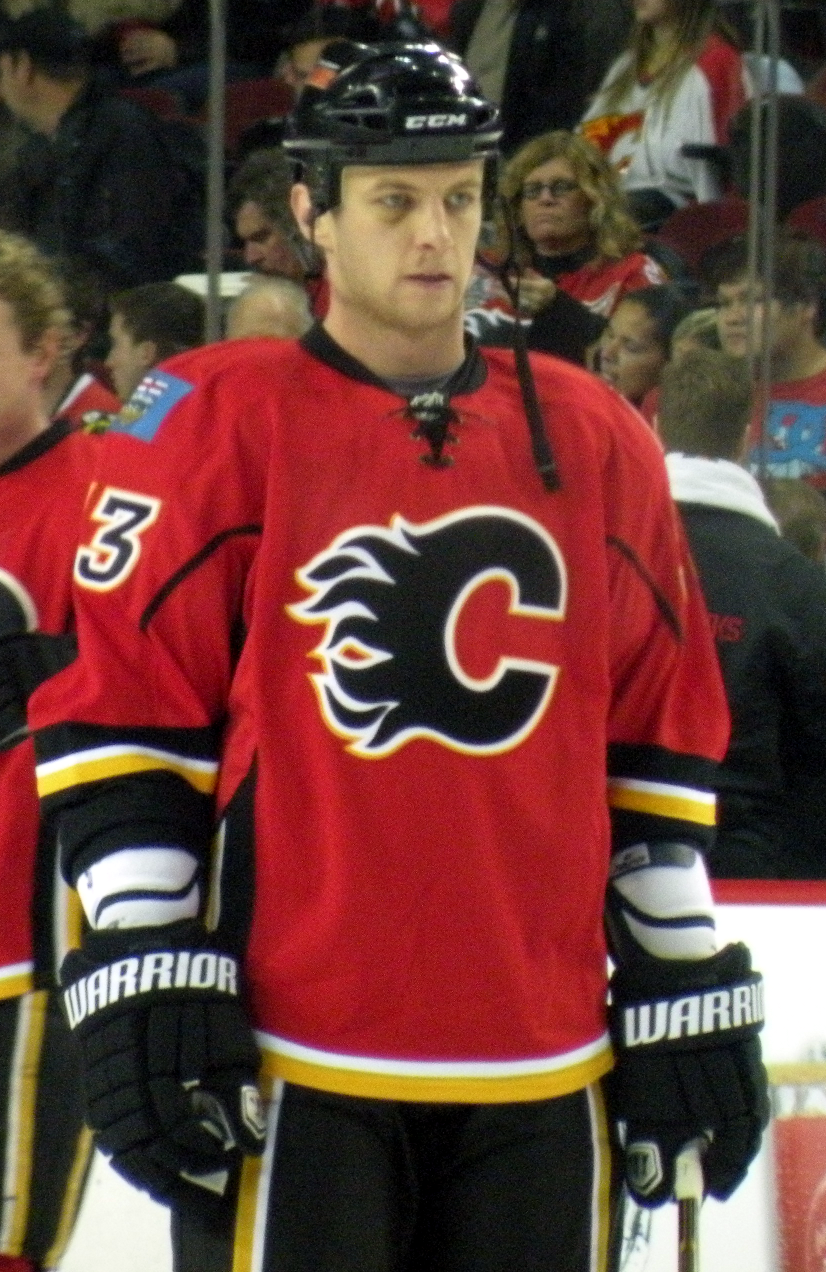
Anton Babchuk

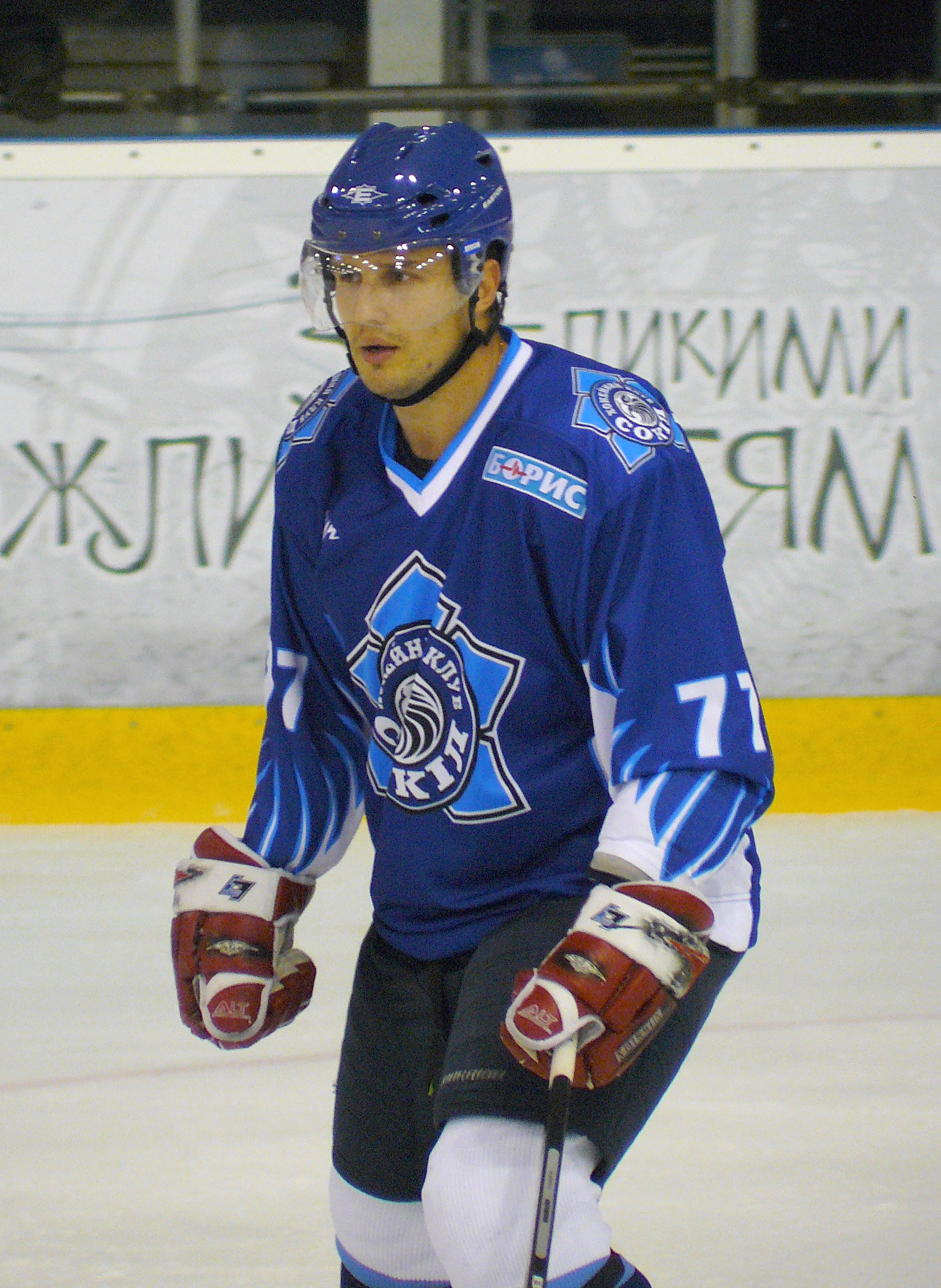
Kostiantyn Kasianchuk

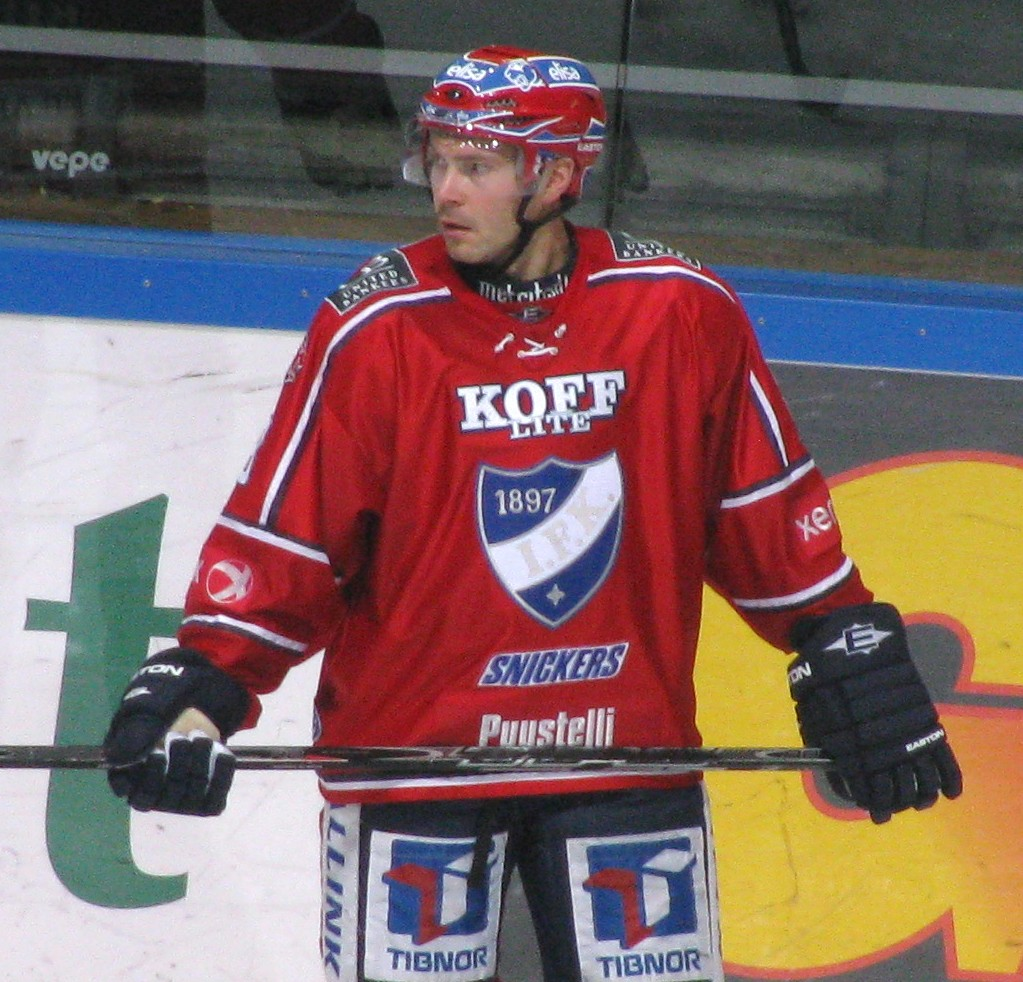
Ross Lupaschuk

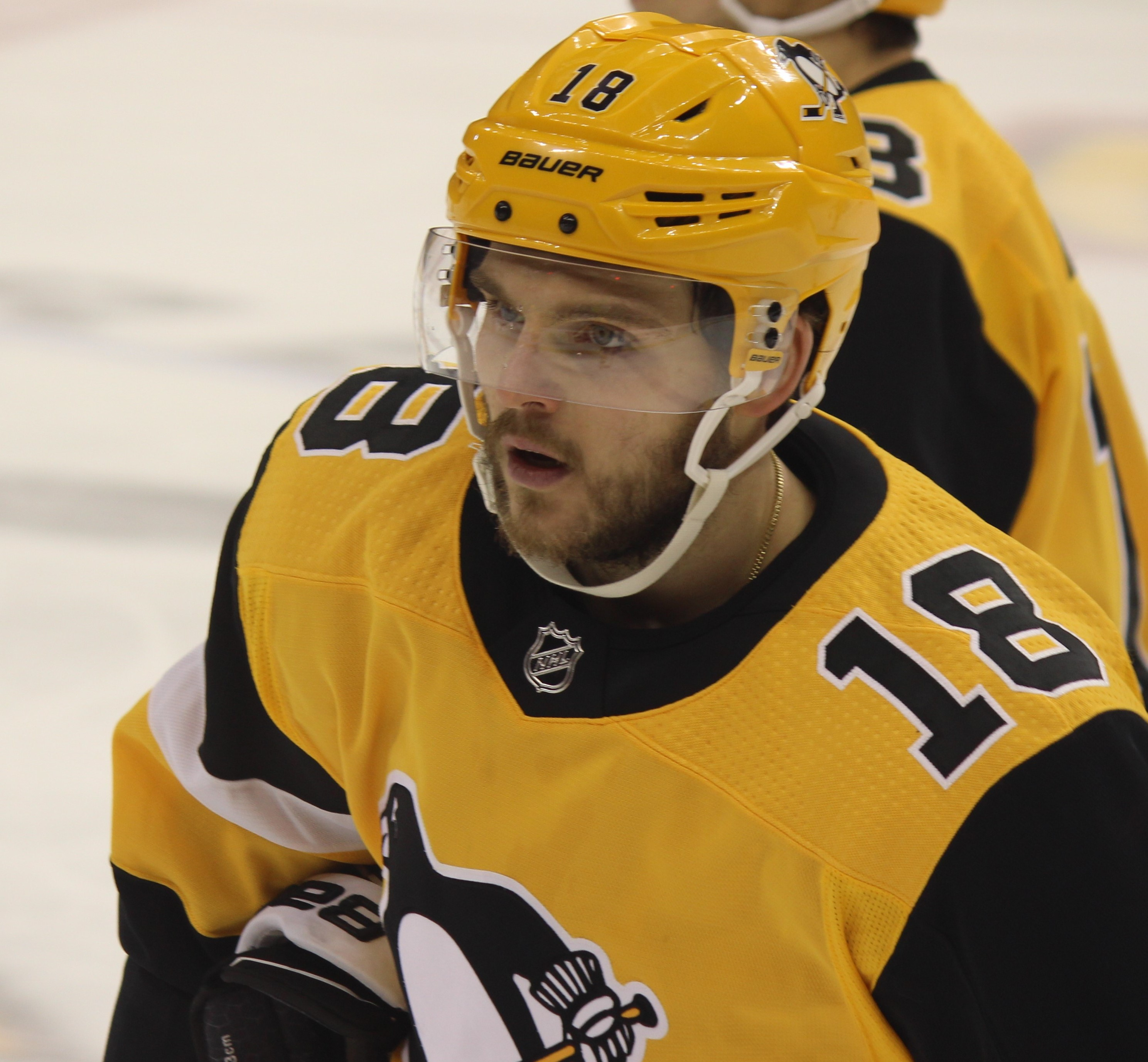
Alex Galchenyuk

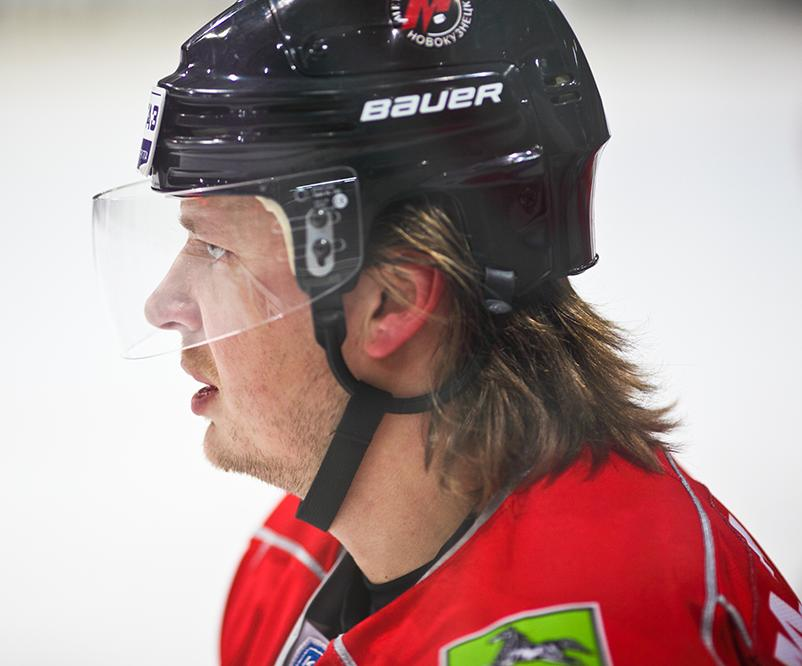
Filipp Metlyuk

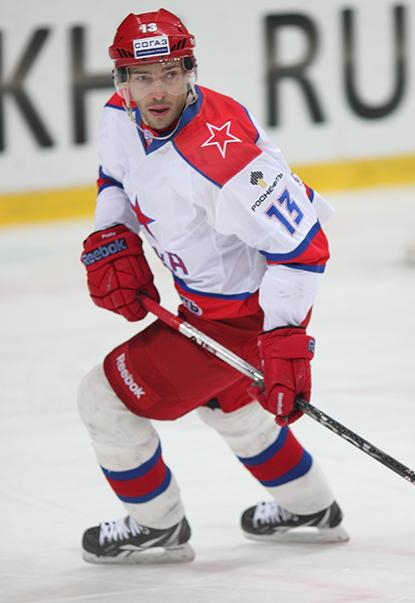
Pavel Datsyuk

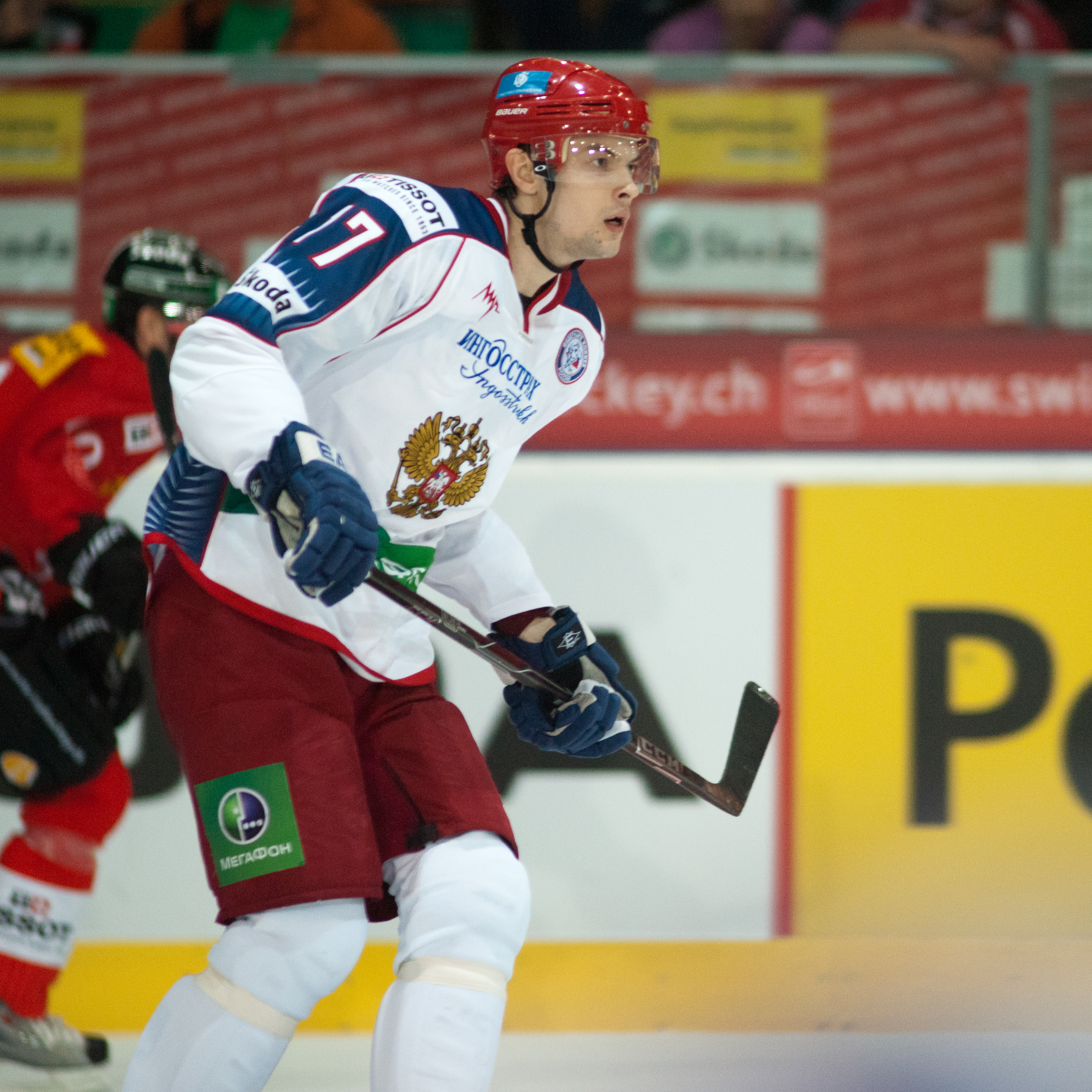
Roman Derlyuk

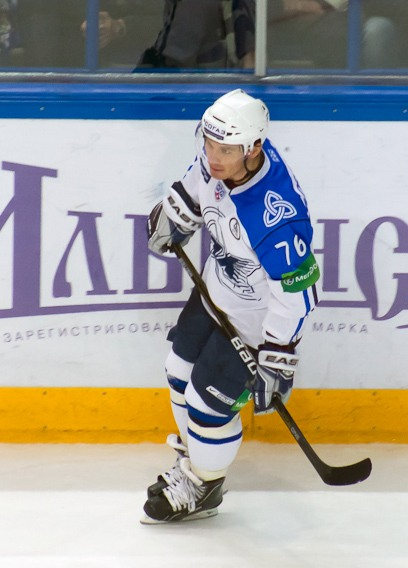
Alexander Korolyuk

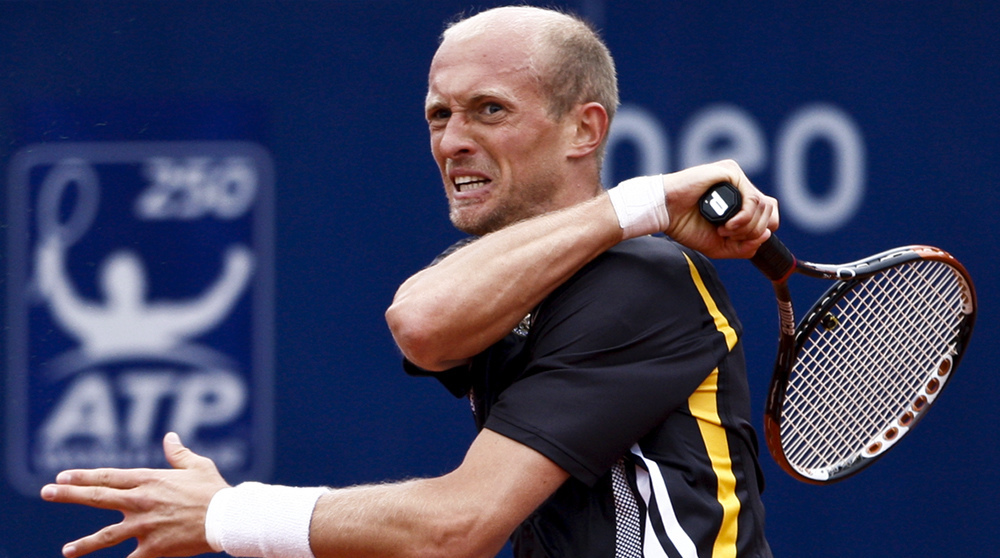
Nikolay Davydenko

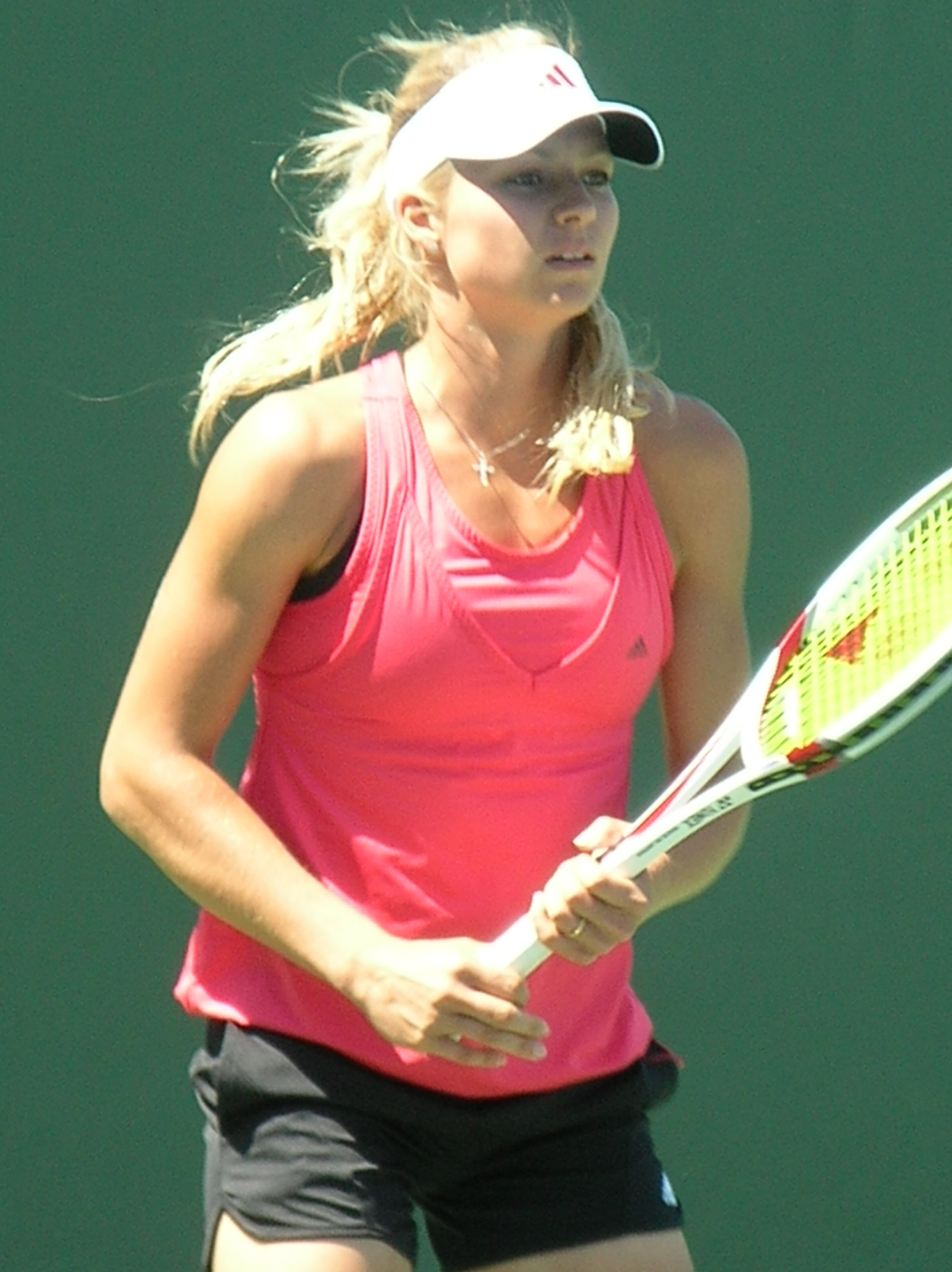
Maria Kirilenko

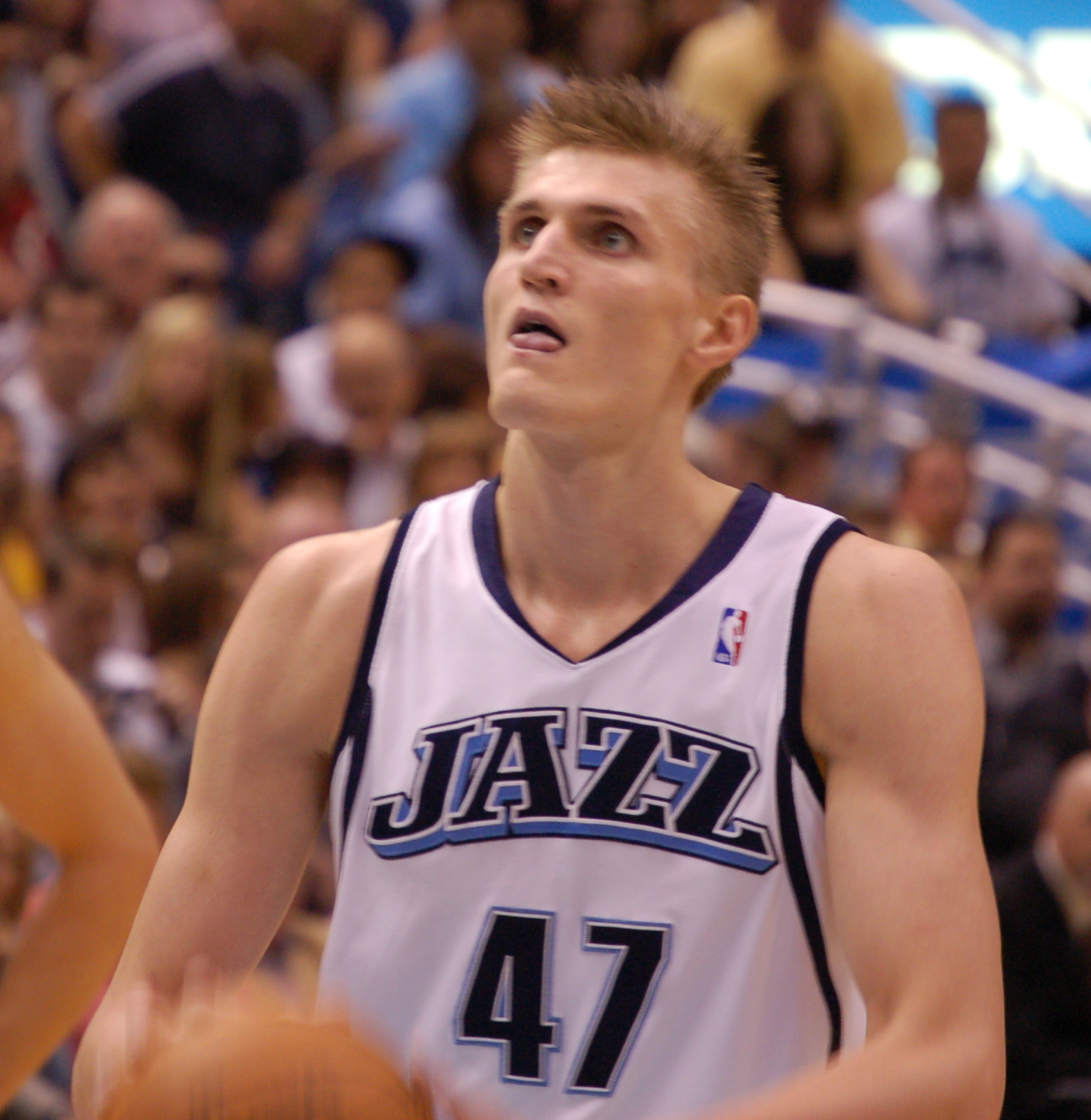
Andrei Kirilenko

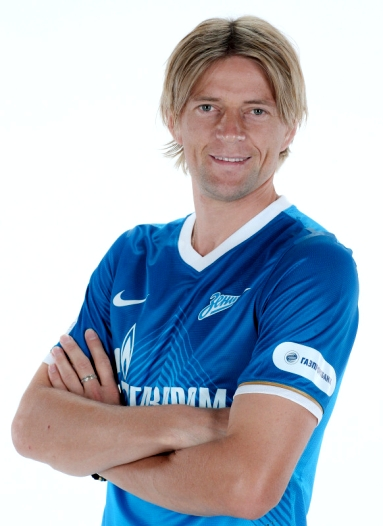
Anatoliy Tymoshchuk

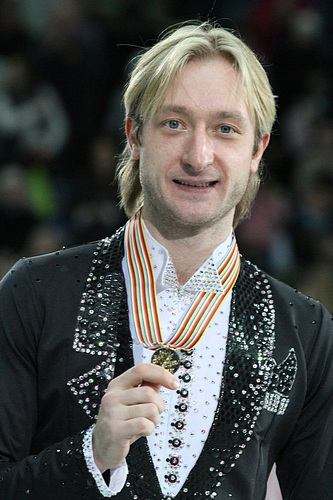
Evgeni Plushenko

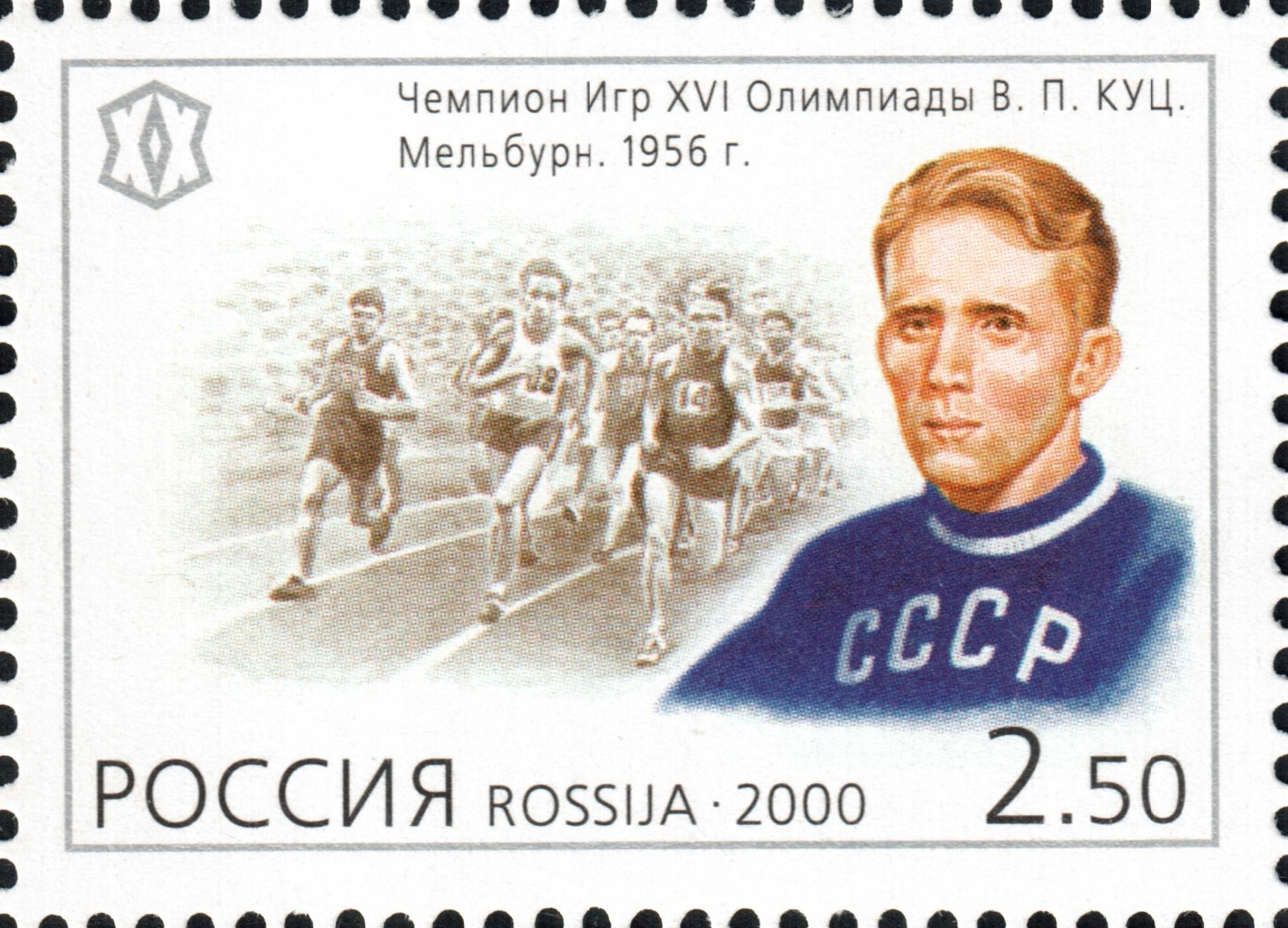
Vladimir Kuts

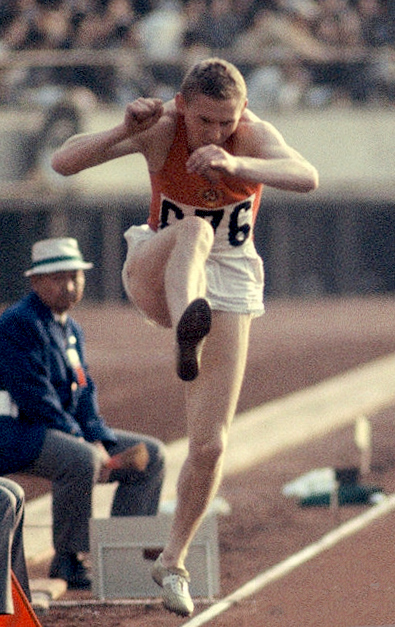
Viktor Kravchenko

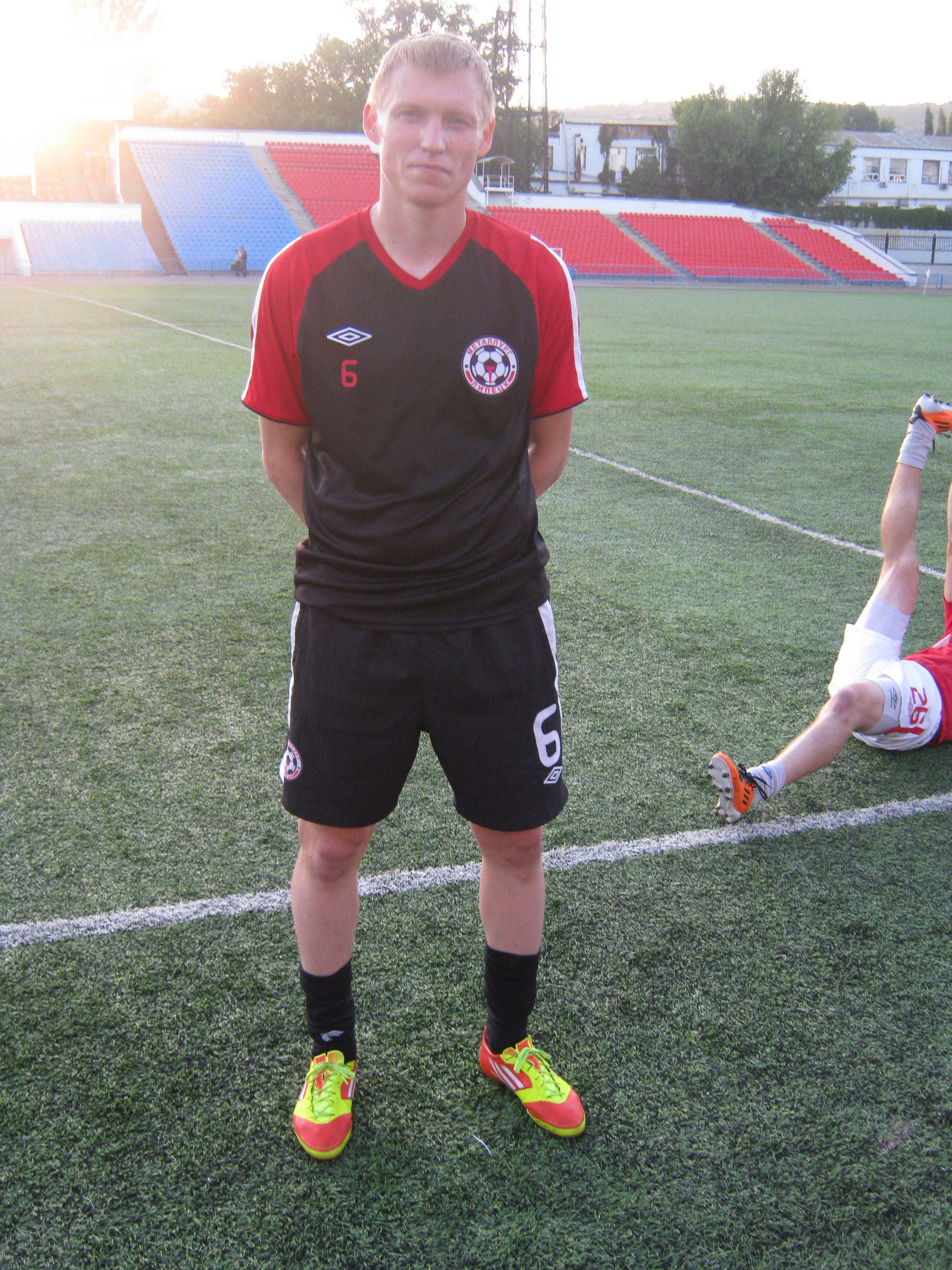
Andrei Zakharenko

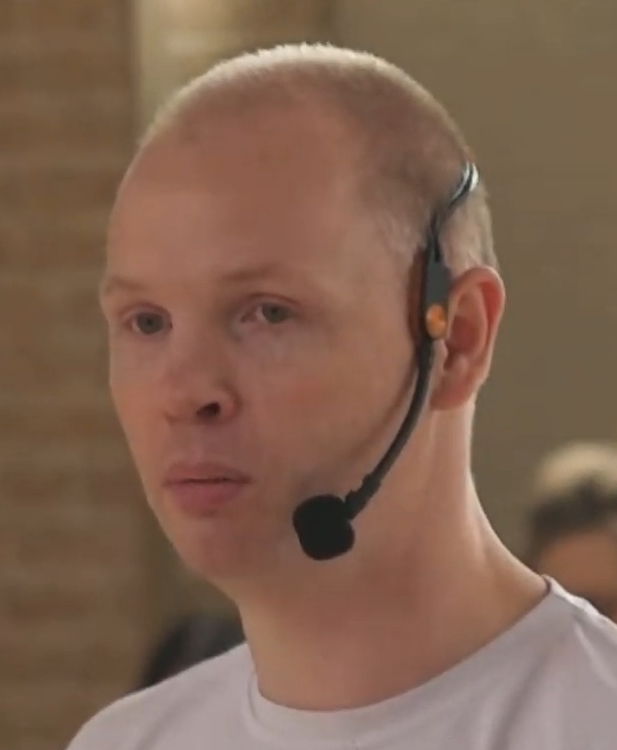
Aleksei Tishchenko

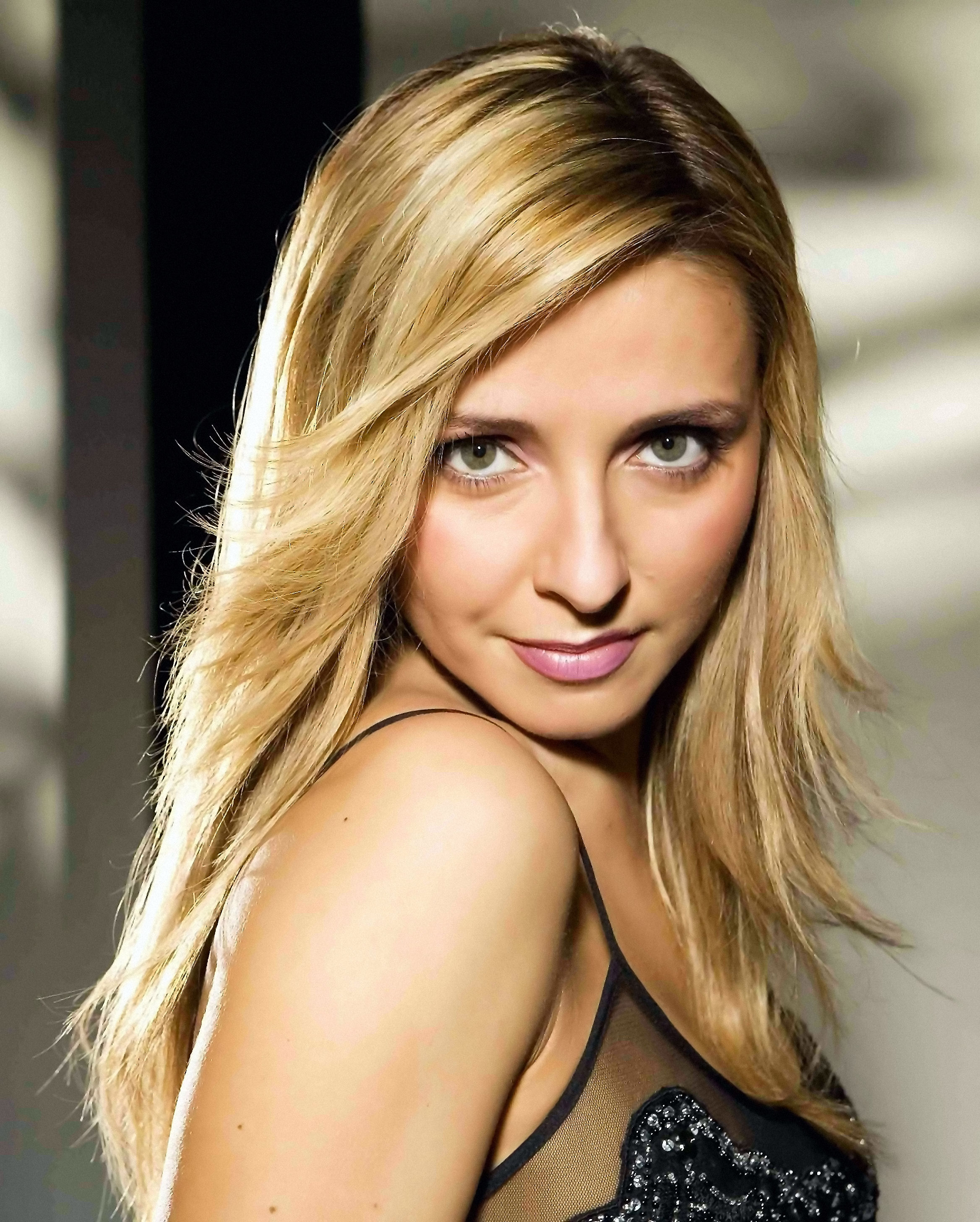
Tatyana Navka

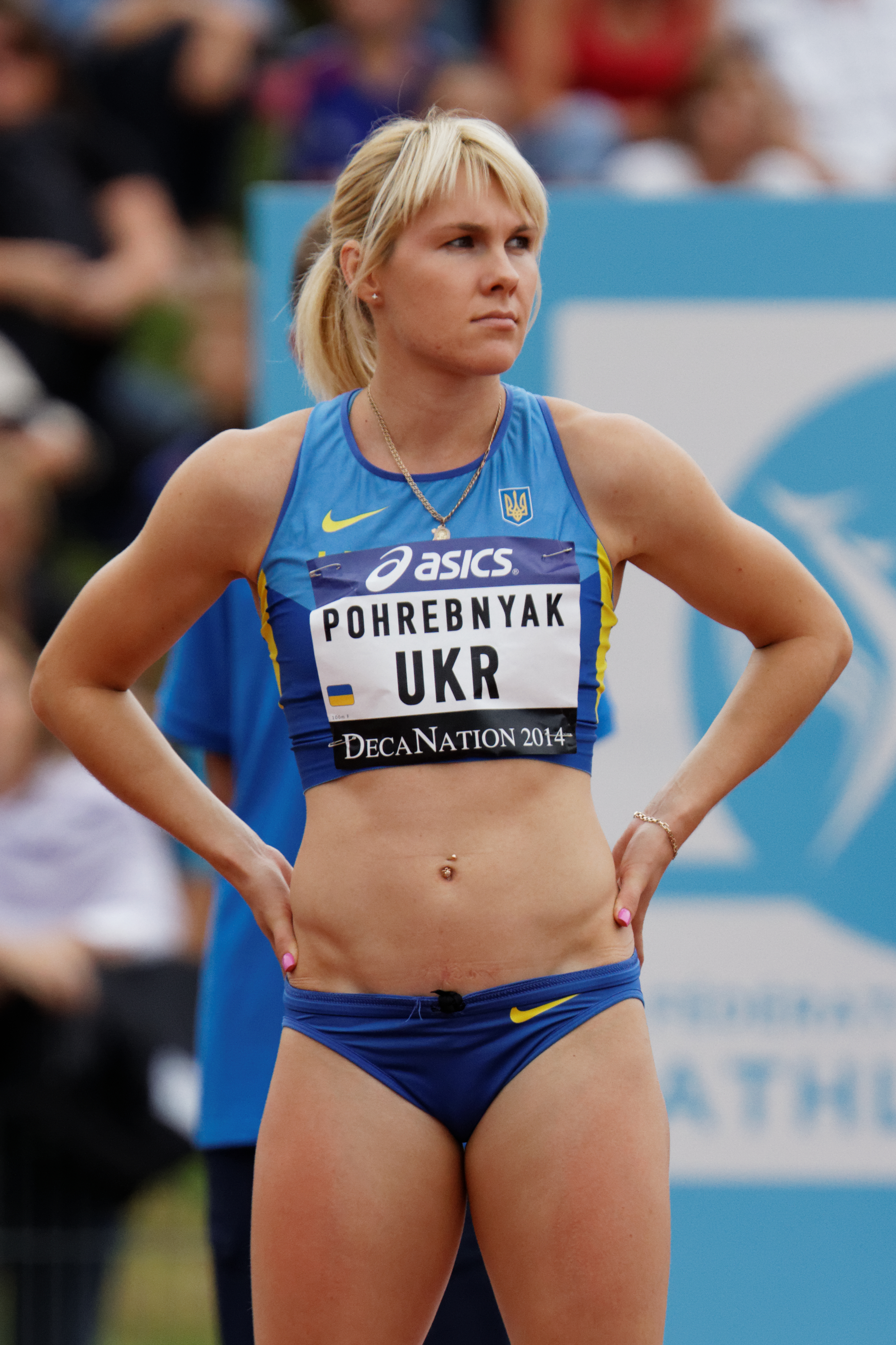
Nataliya Pohrebnyak

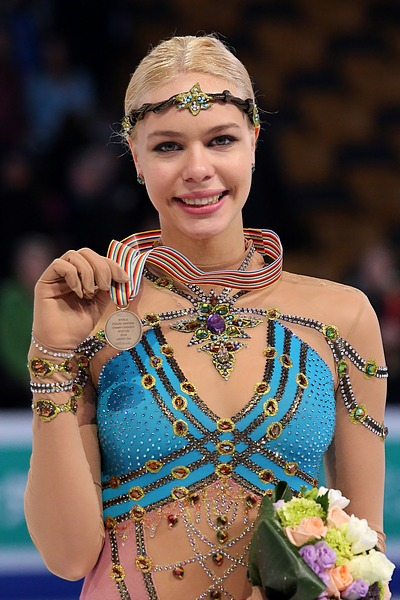
Anna Pogorilaya

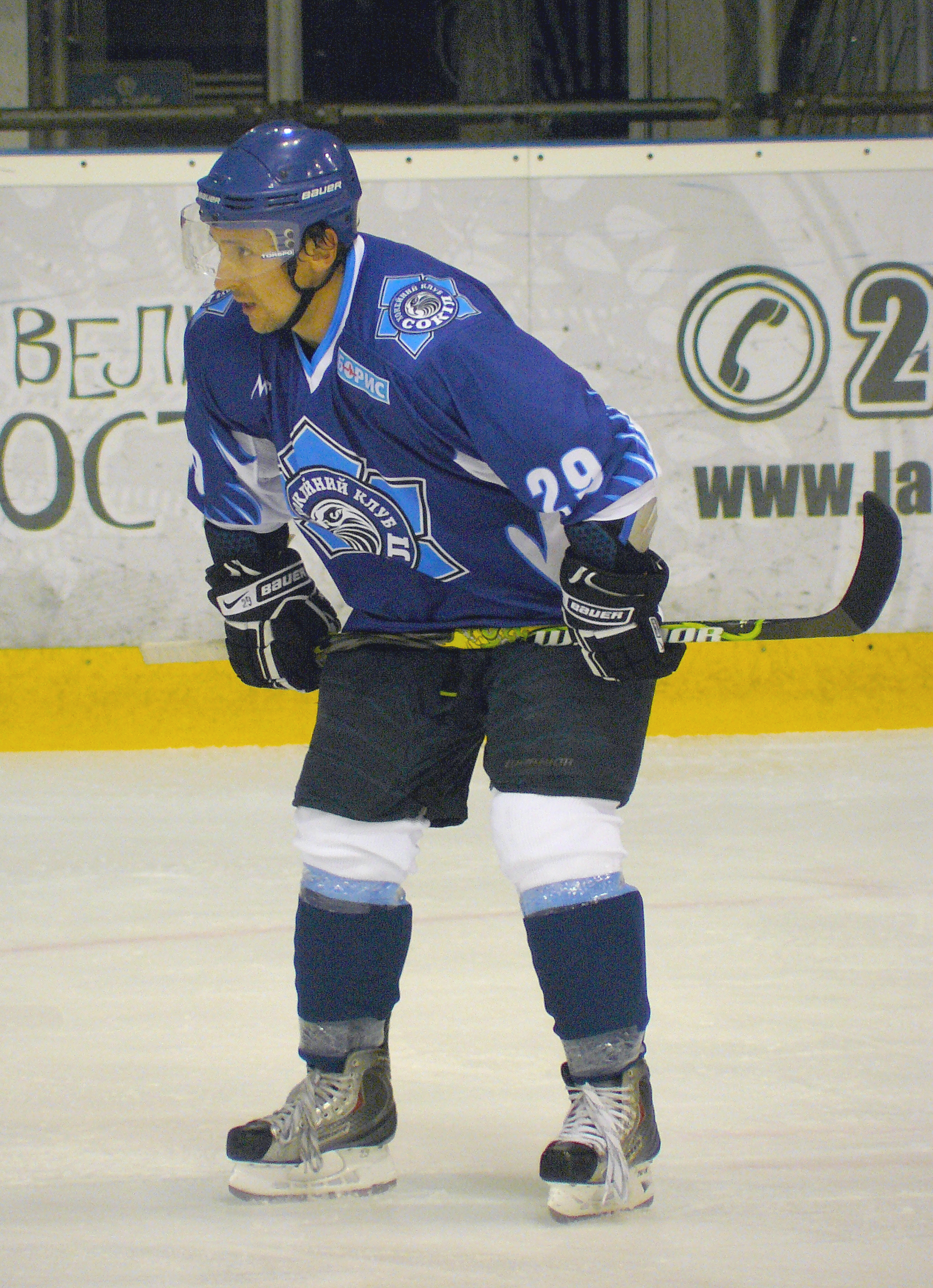
Valentyn Oletsky

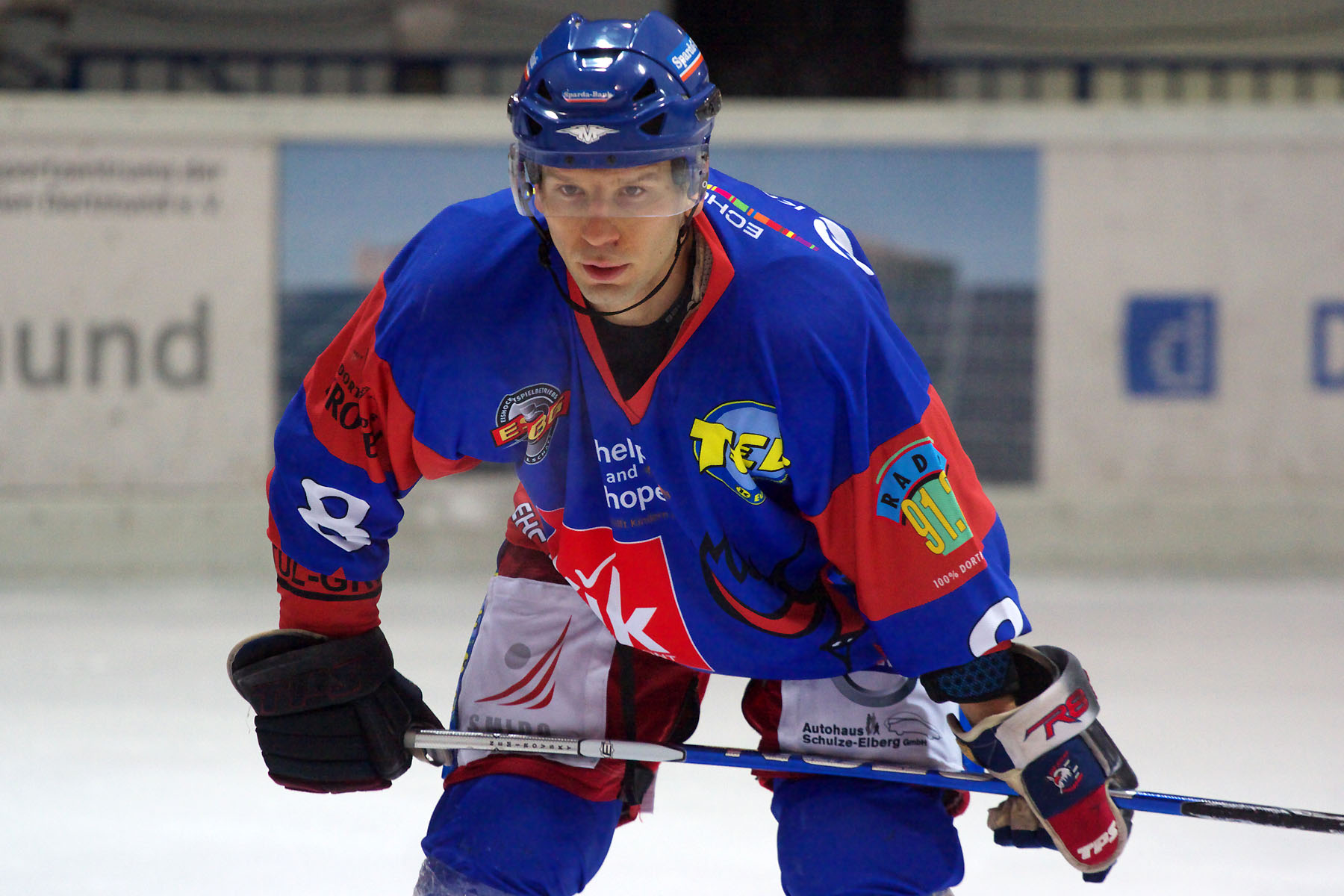
Mikhail Nemirovsky

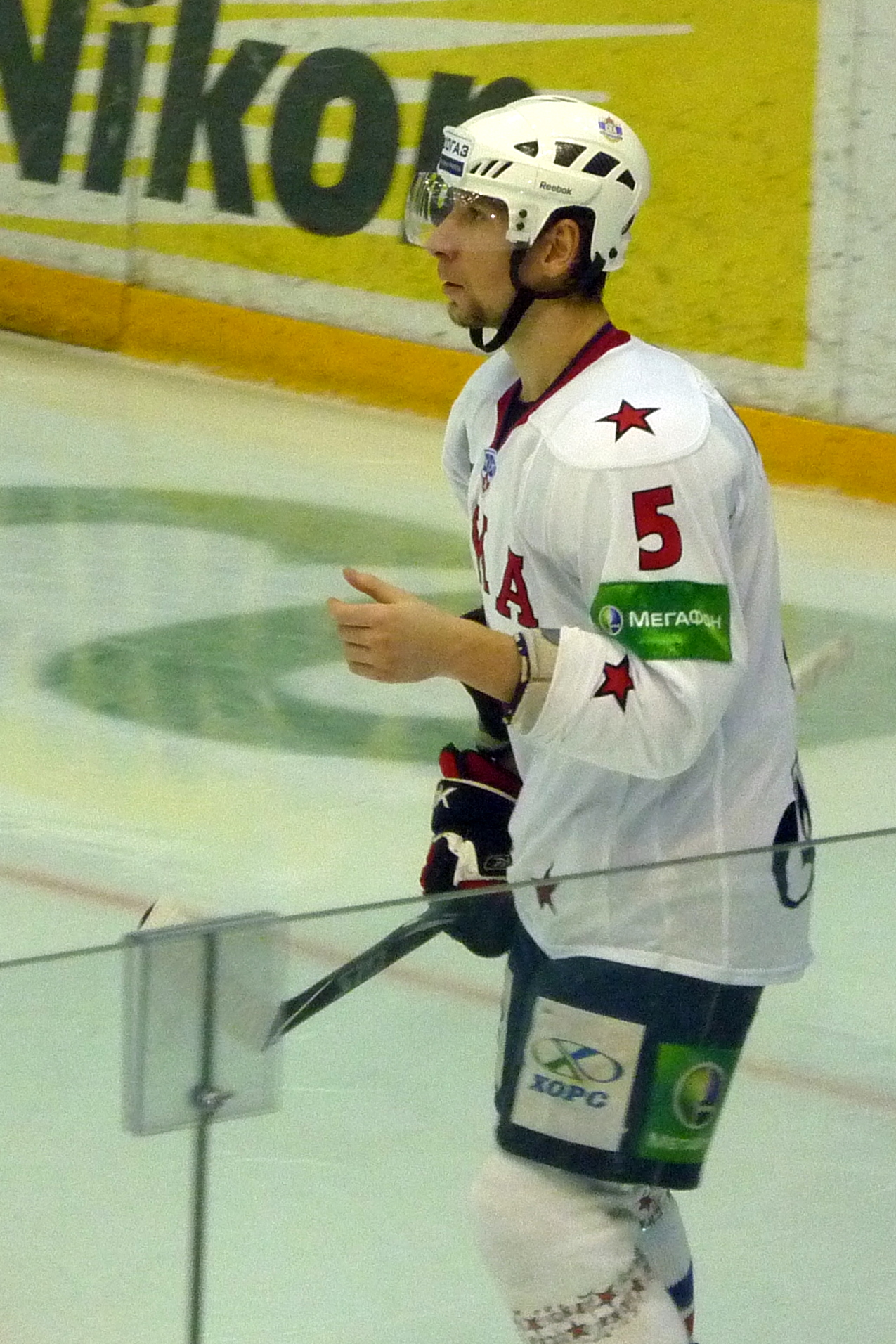
Vitaly Vishnevskiy

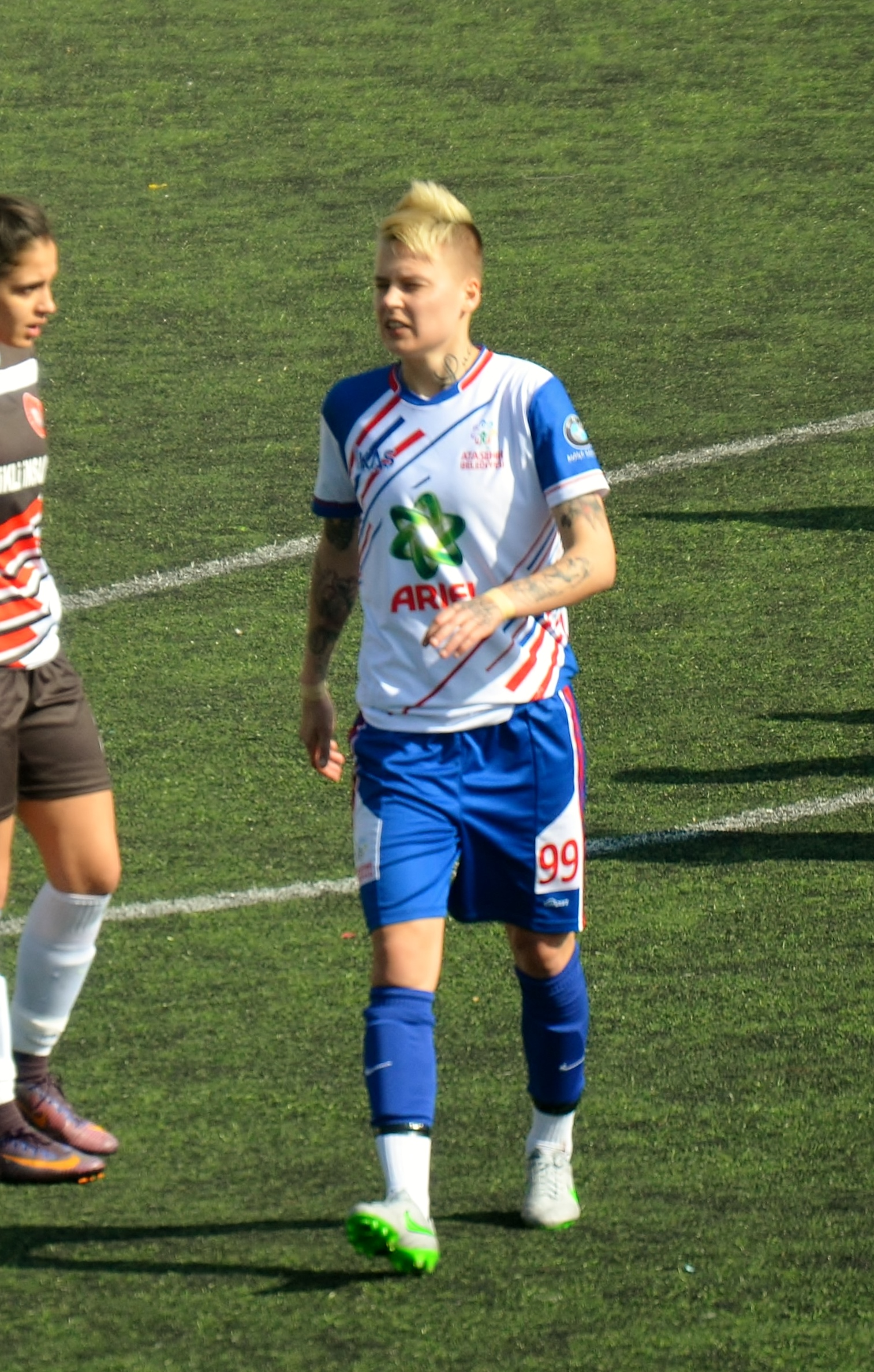
Tetyana Kozyrenko

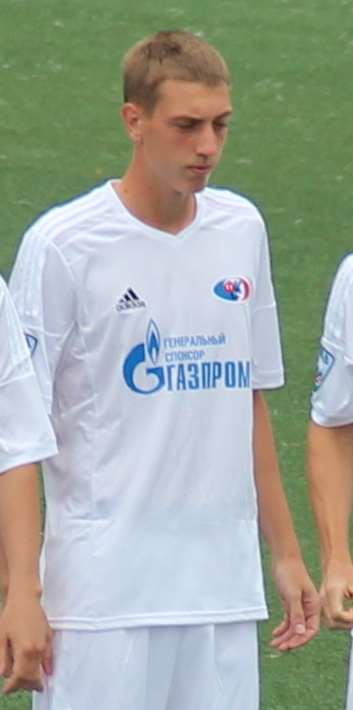
Kostyantyn Parkhomenko

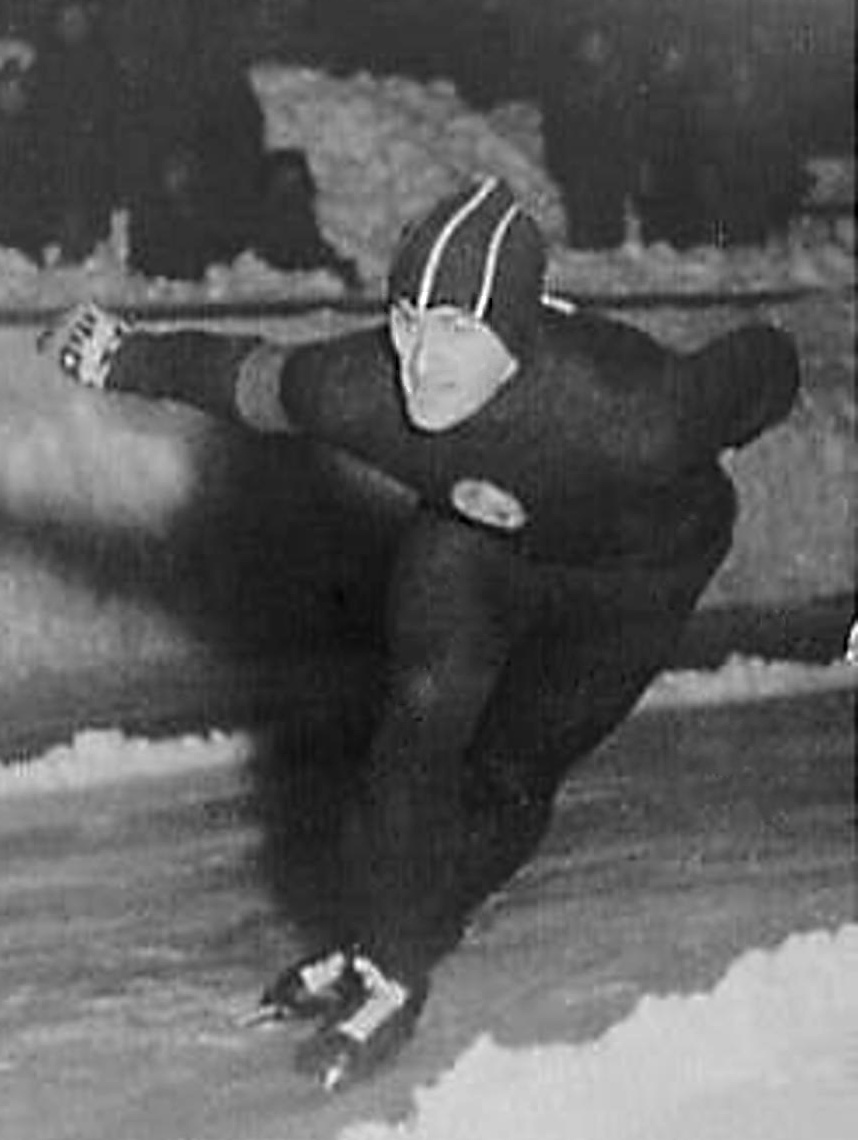
Oleg Goncharenko

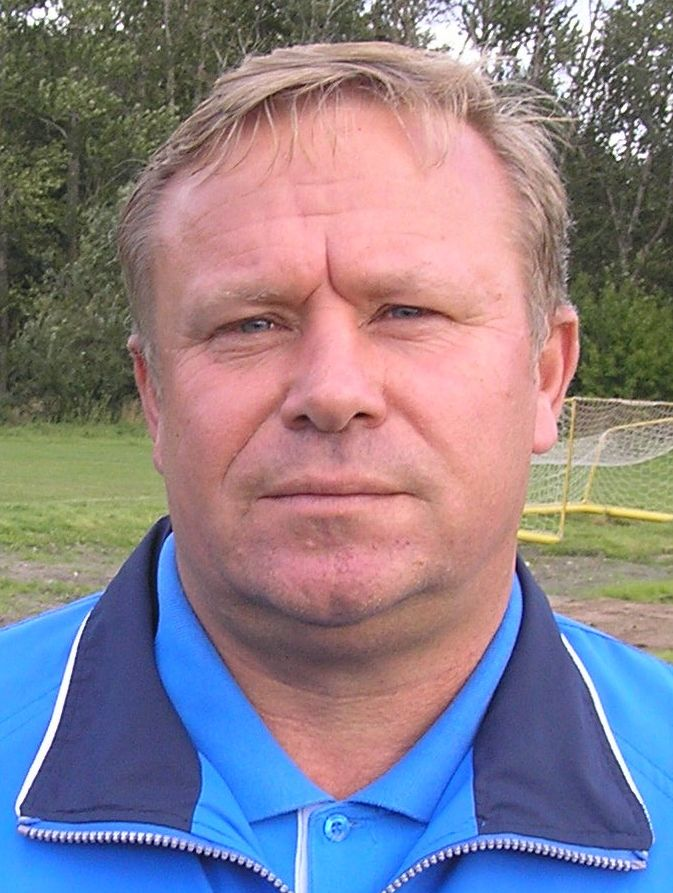
Leonid Tkachenko

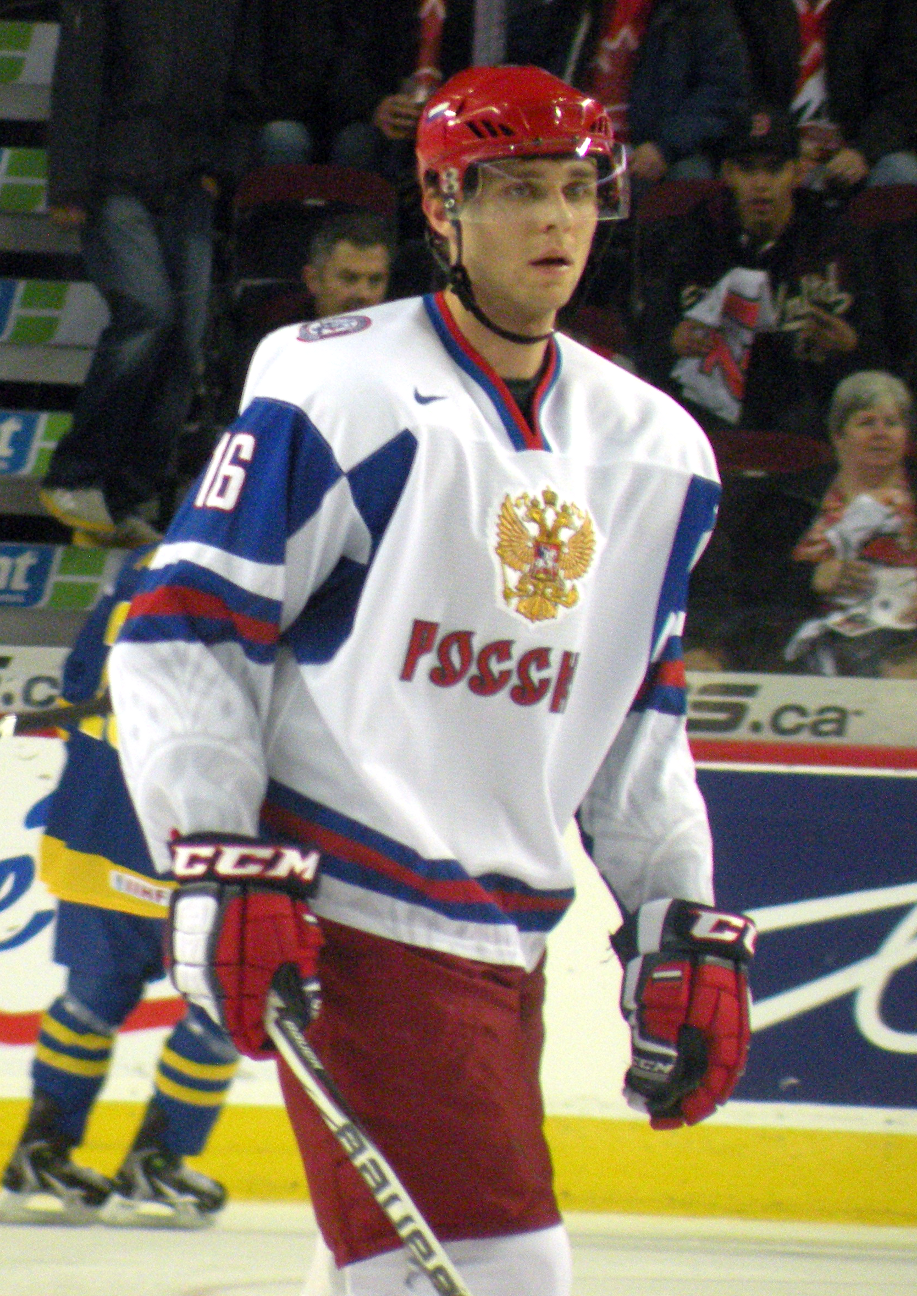
Ignat Zemchenko

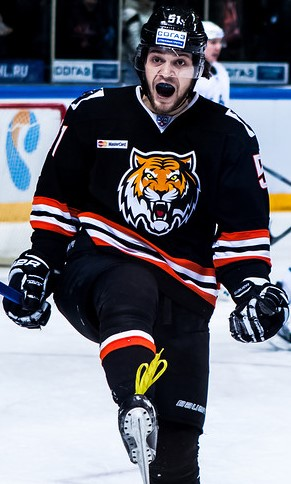
Vyacheslav Litovchenko

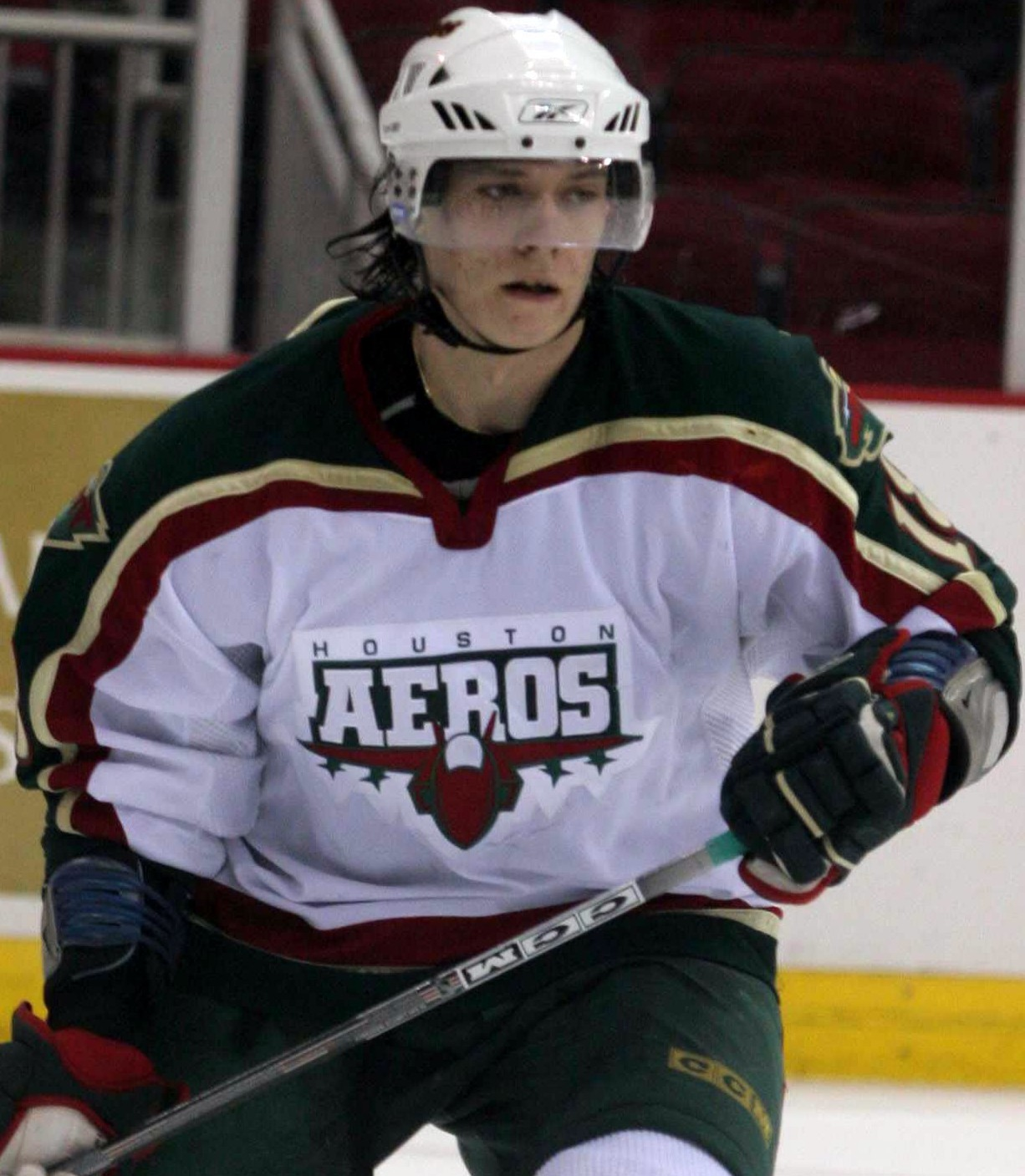
Roman Voloshenko

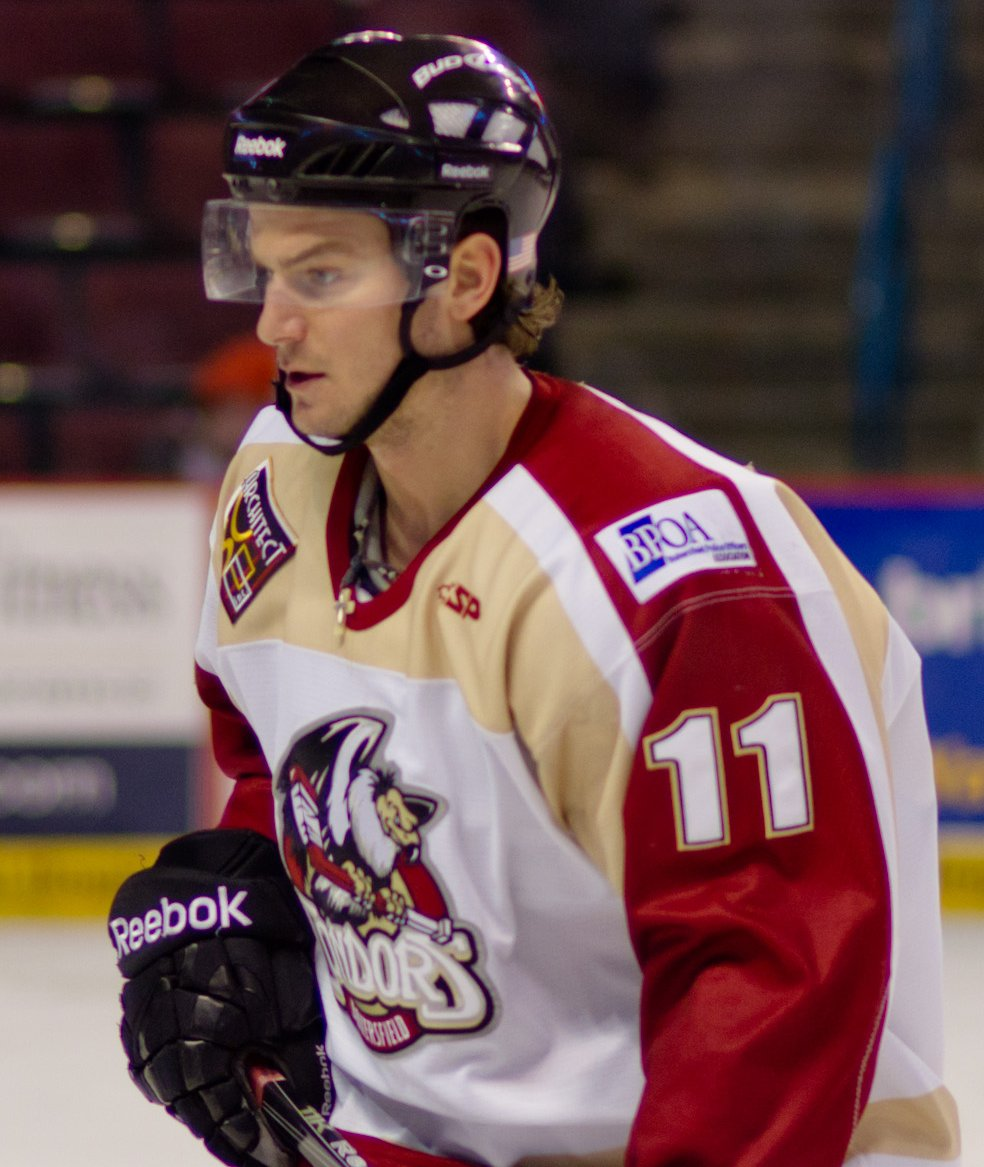
Vyacheslav Trukhno

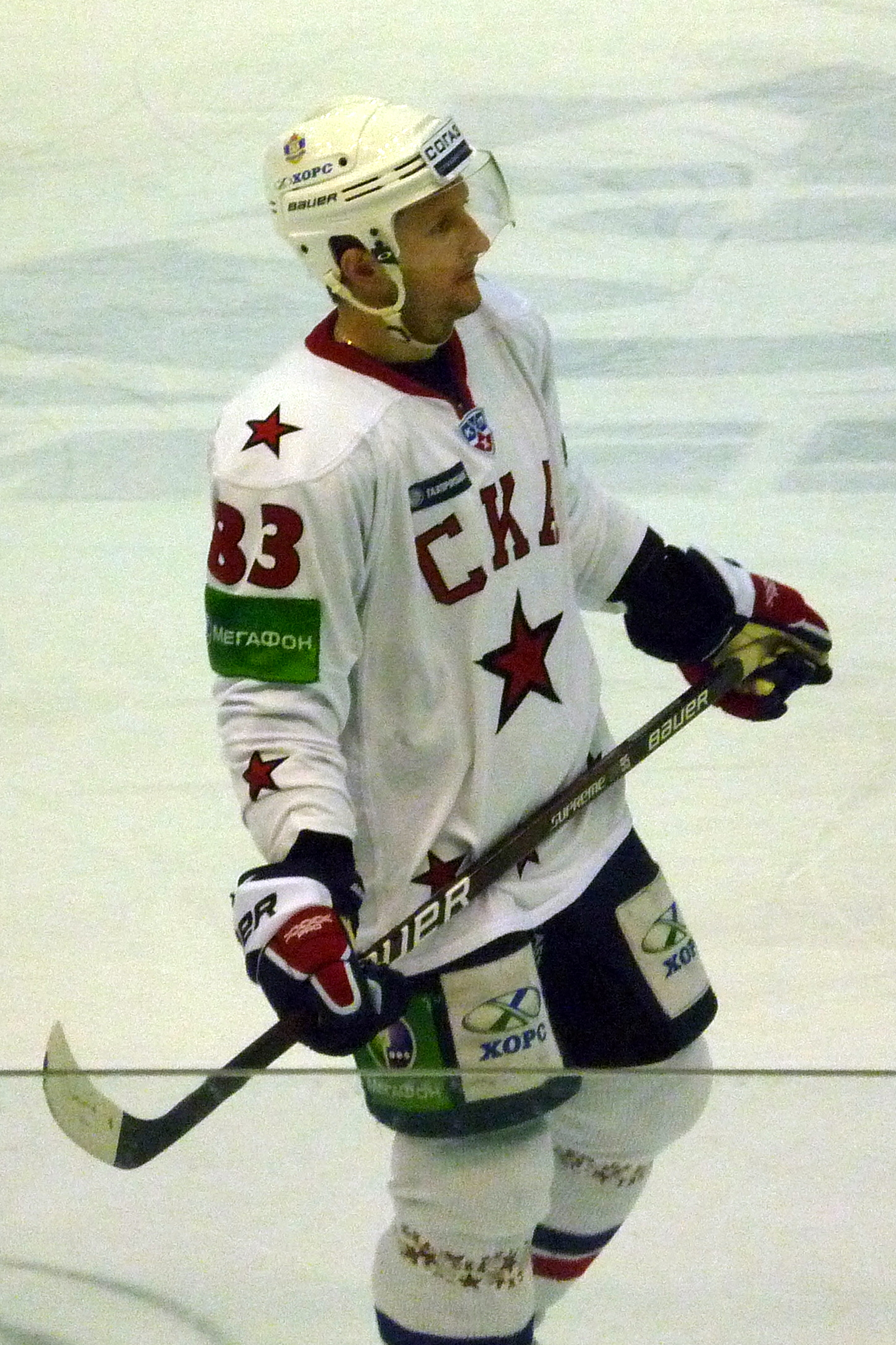
Gleb Klimenko

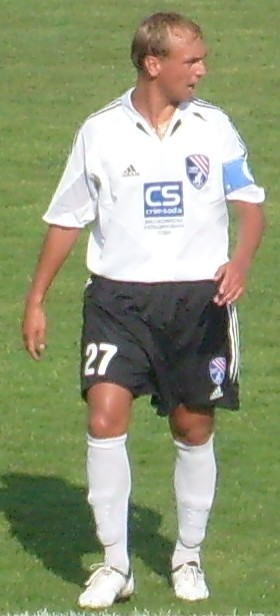
Denys Holaydo

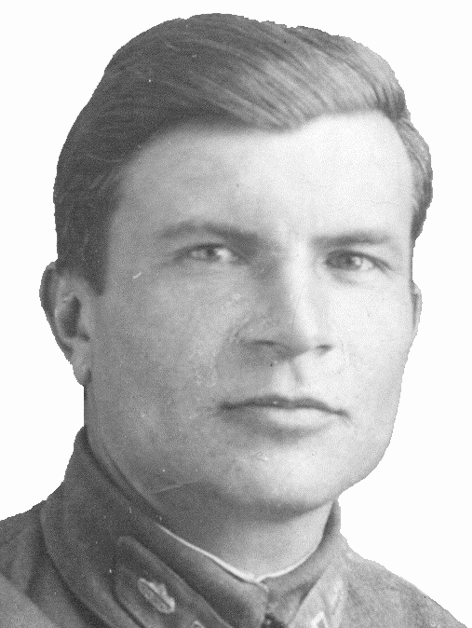
Hryhoriy Nosko

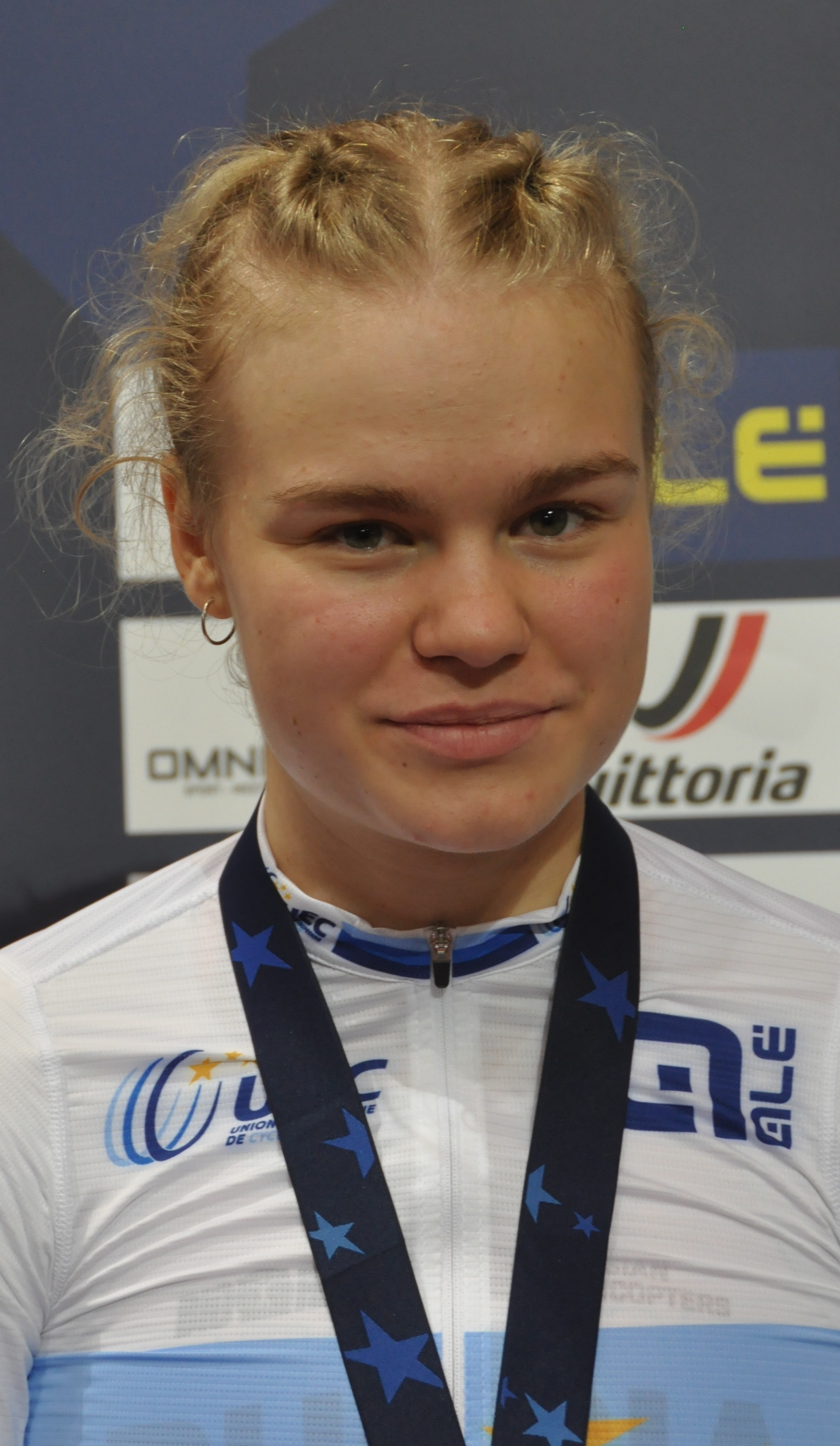
Alina Lysenko

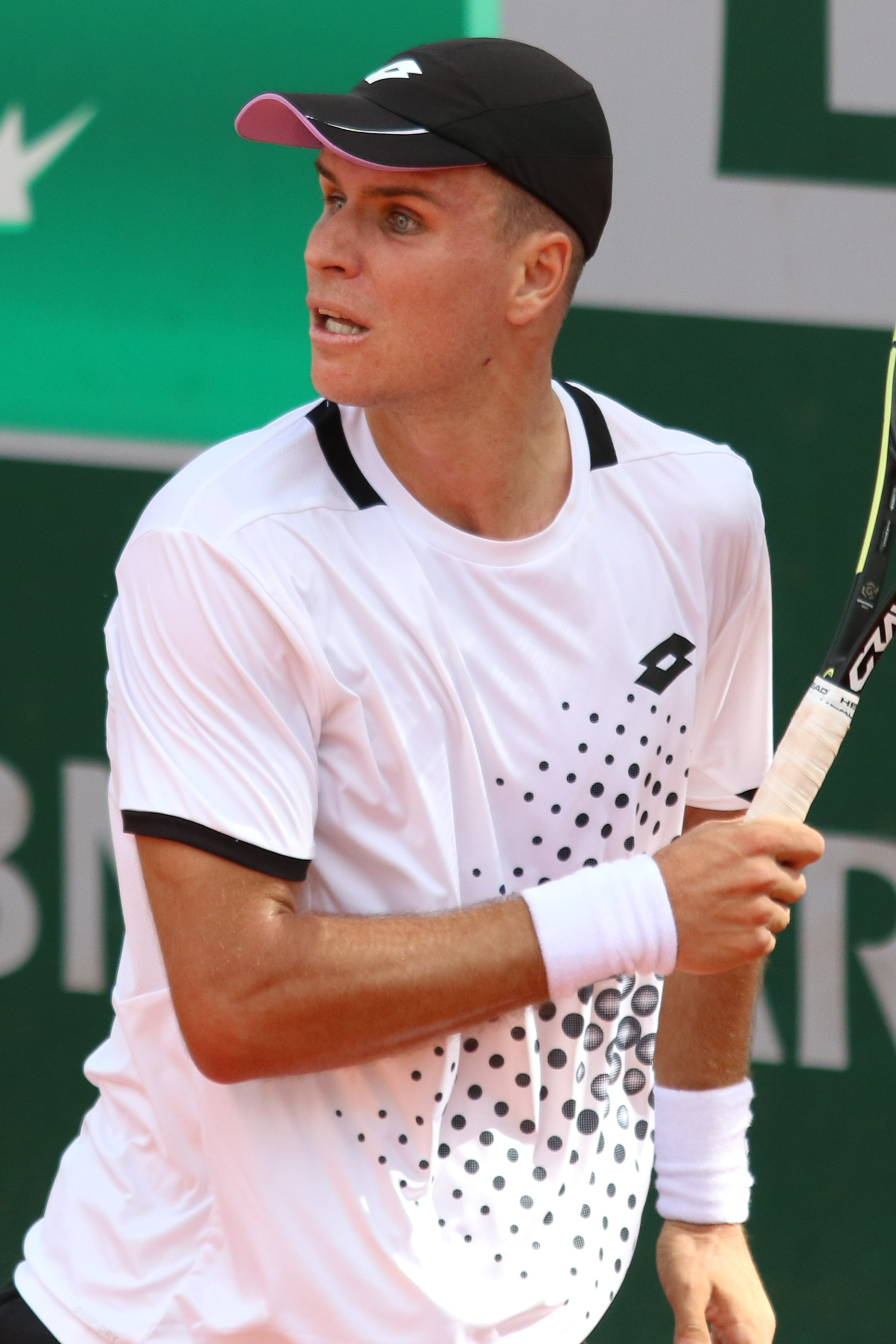
Dmitry Popko

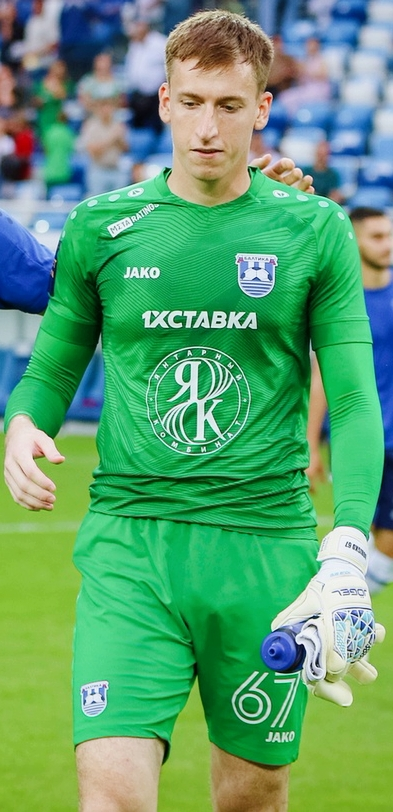
Maksim Borisko

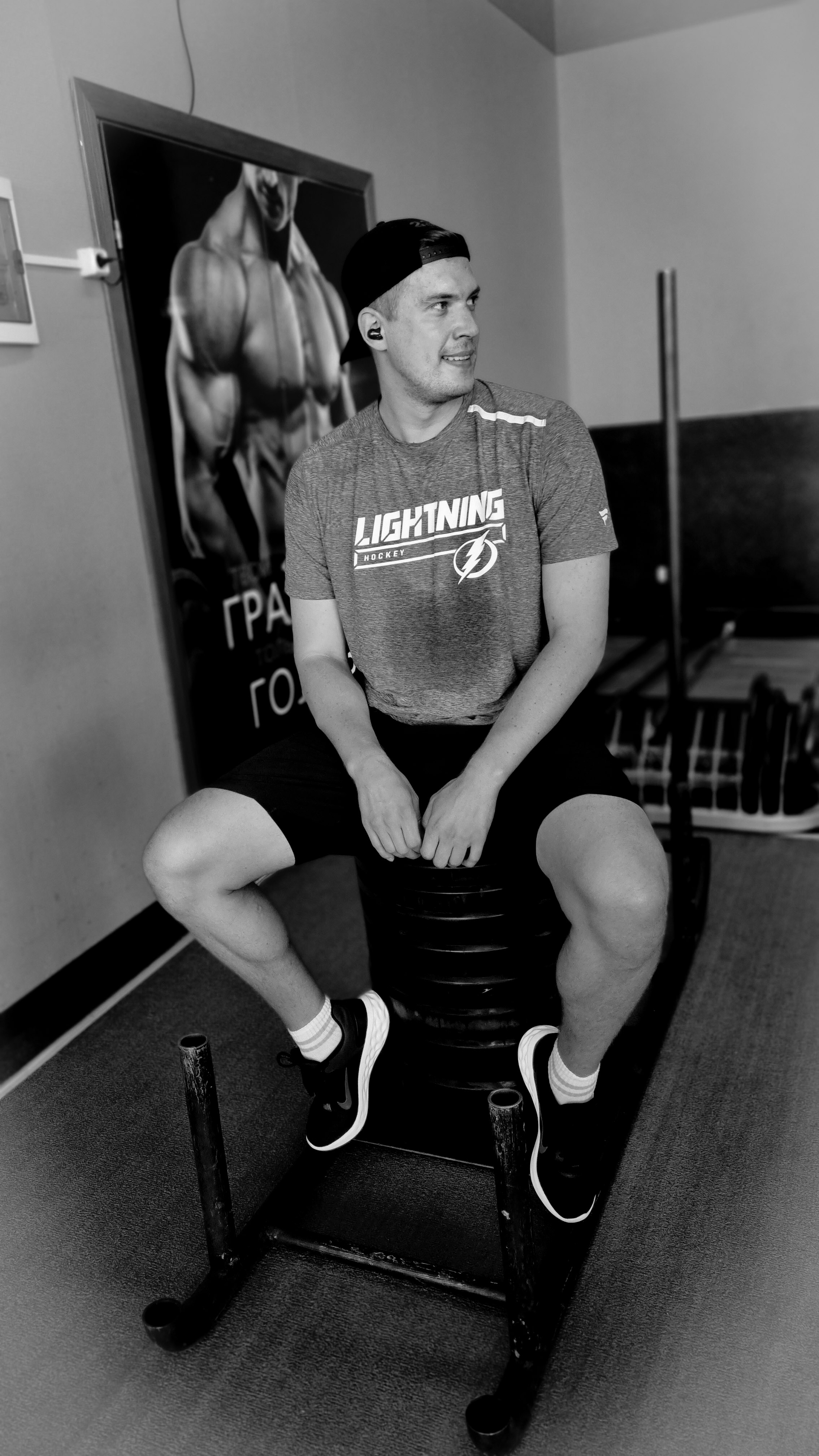
Vitaly Teslenko

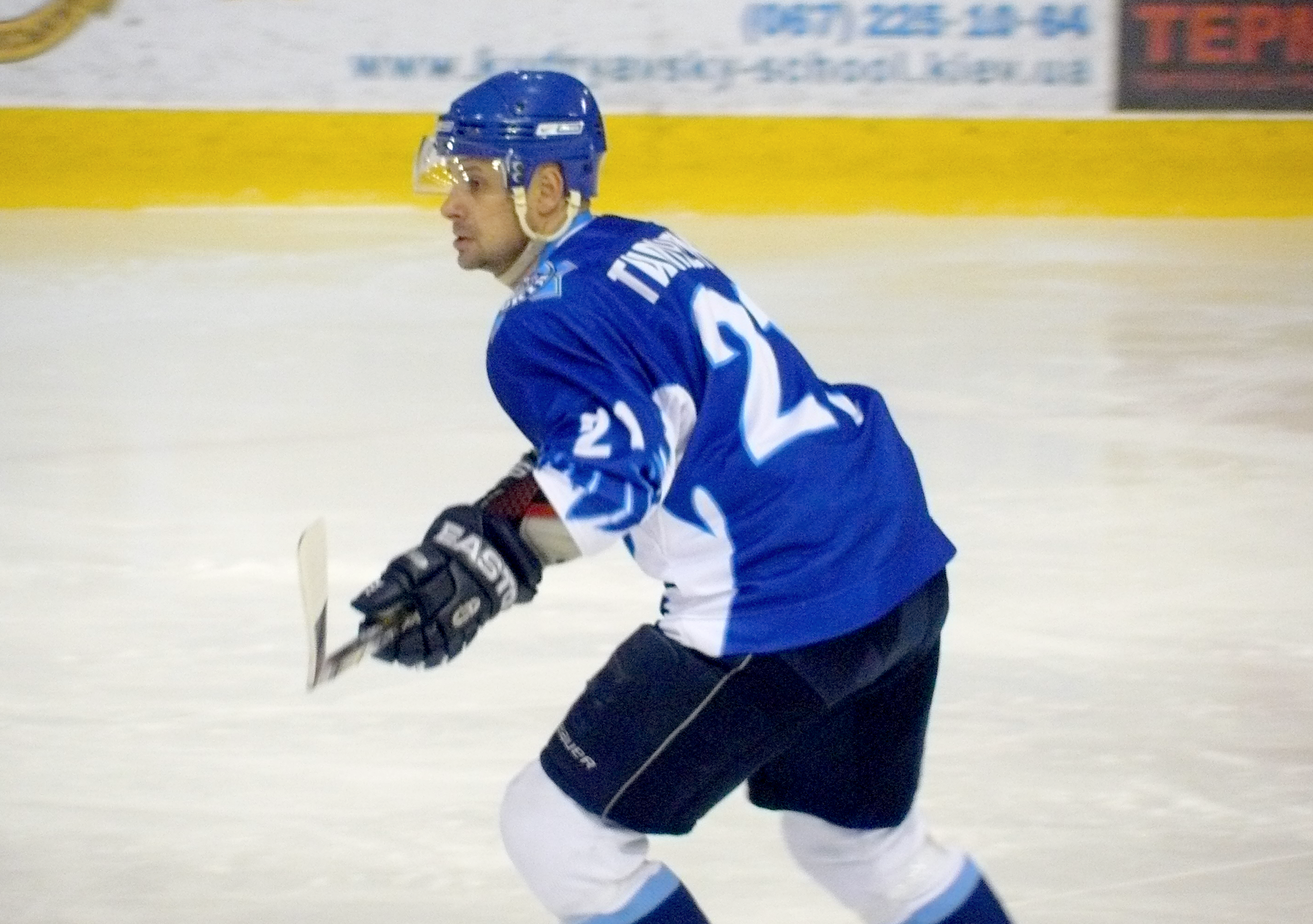
Vyacheslav Timchenko

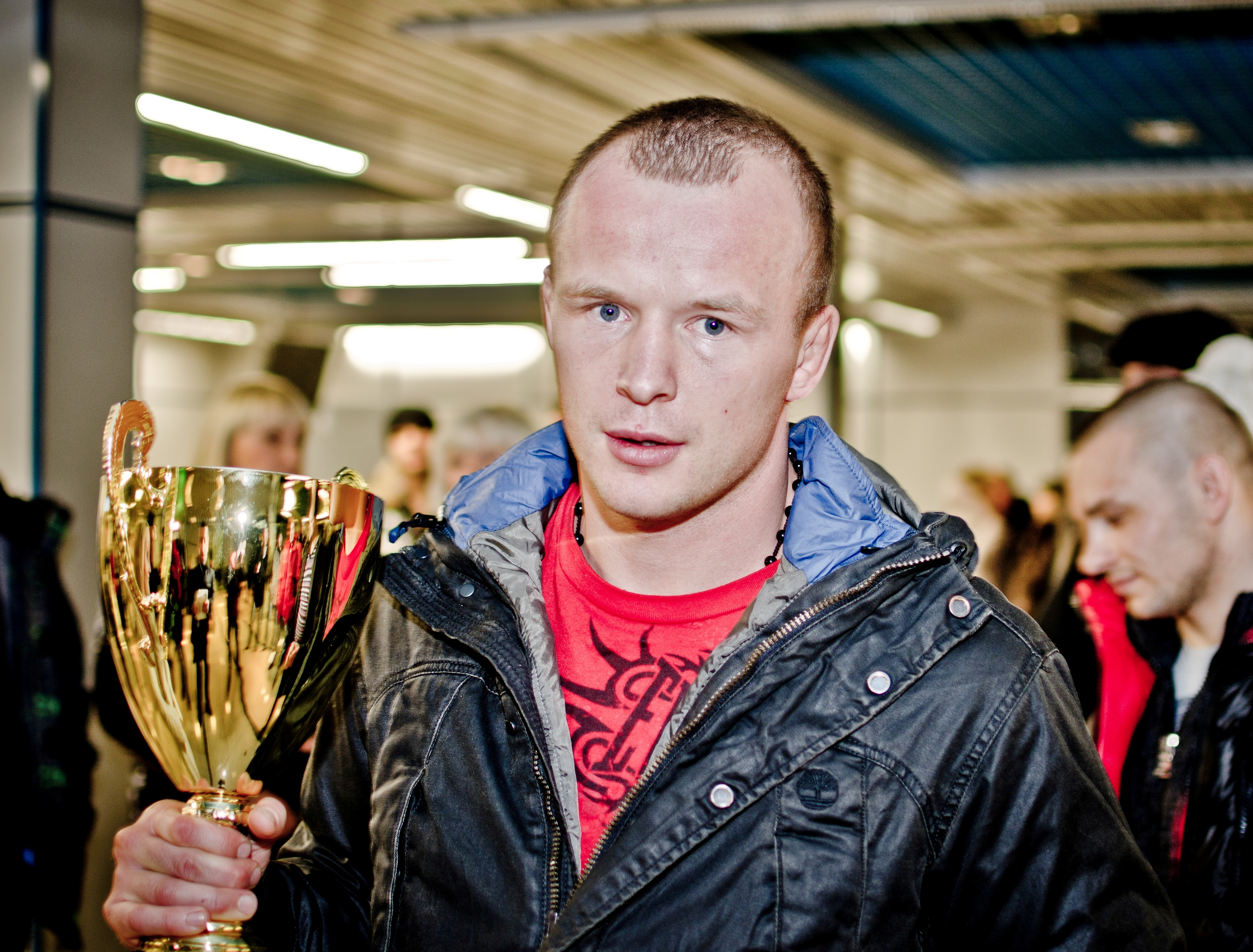
Alexander Shlemenko

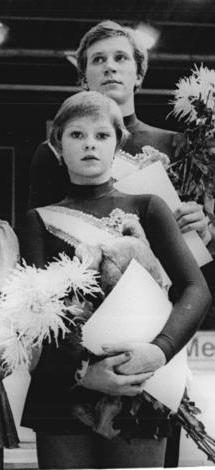
Valery Kornienko

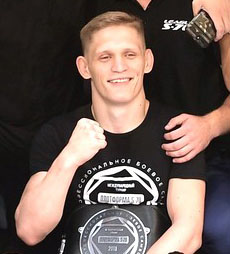
Sergey Khandozhko

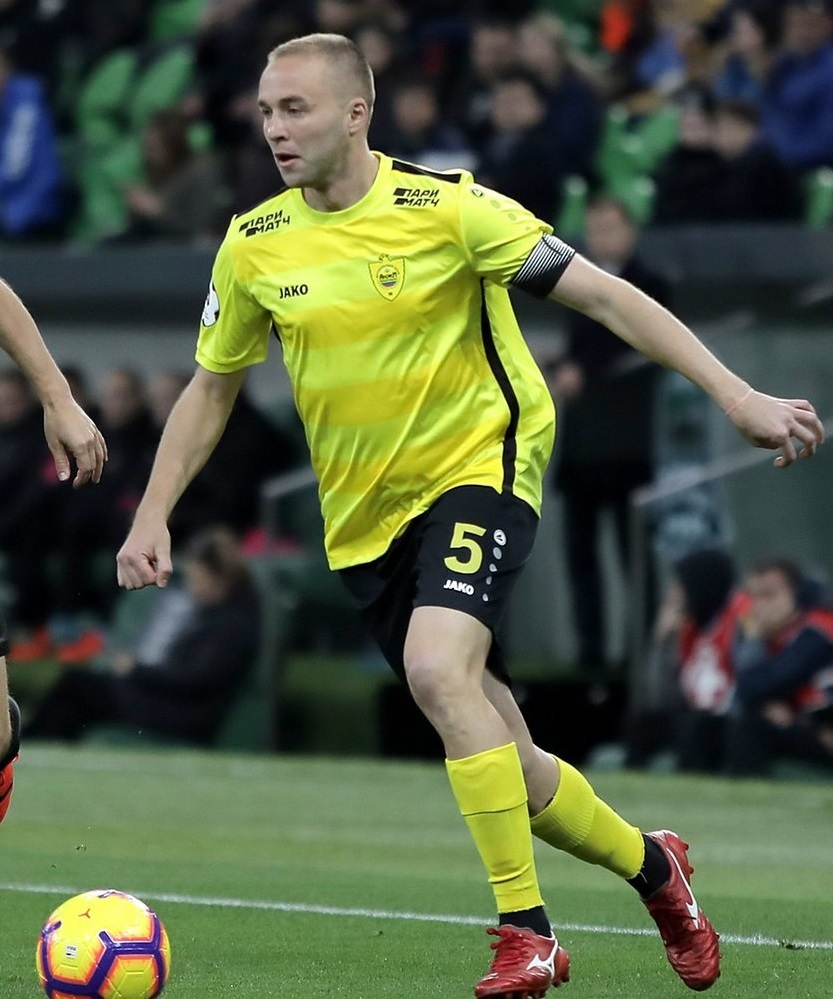
Vladislav Kulik

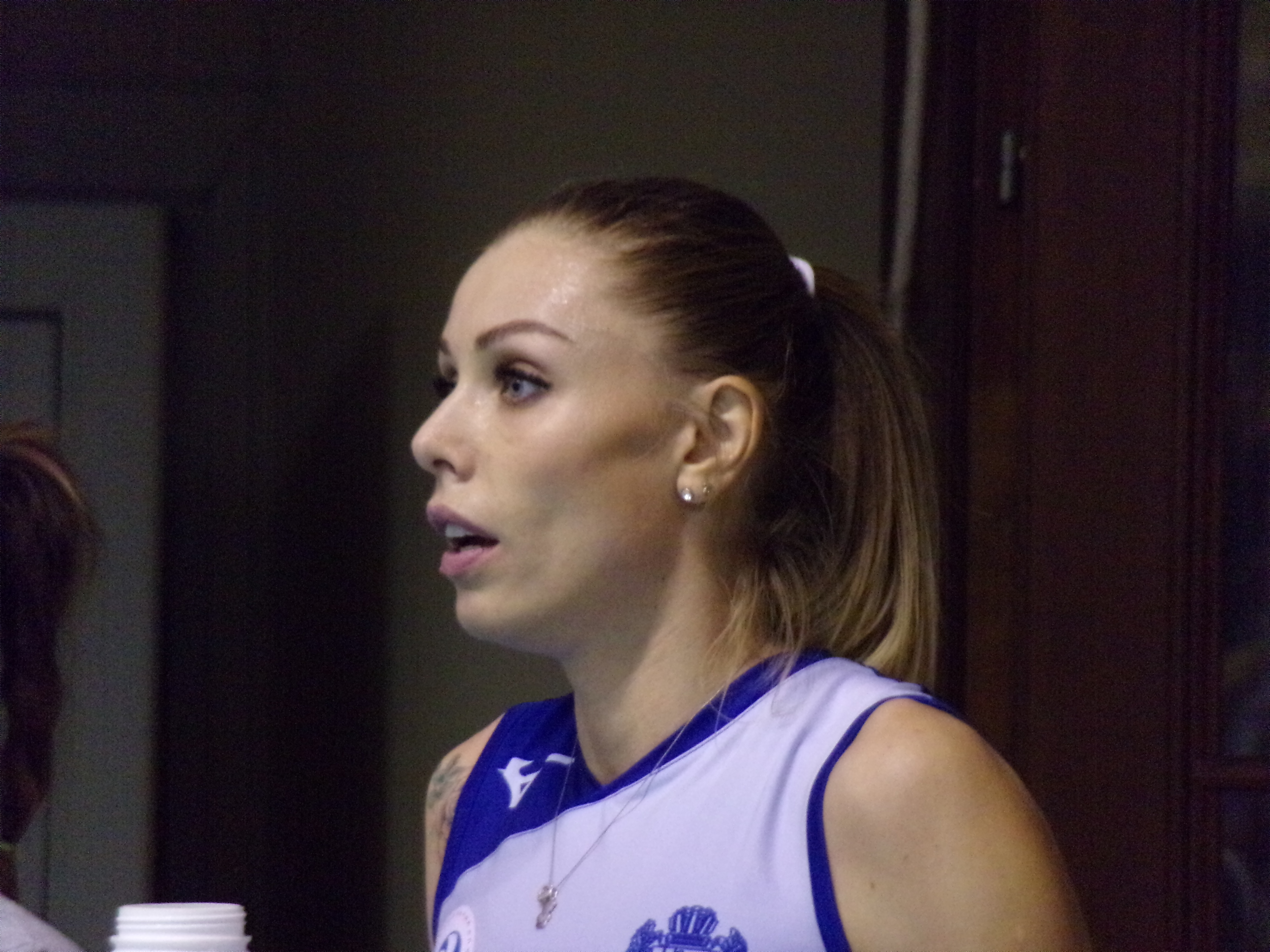
Anastasia Shlyakhovaya

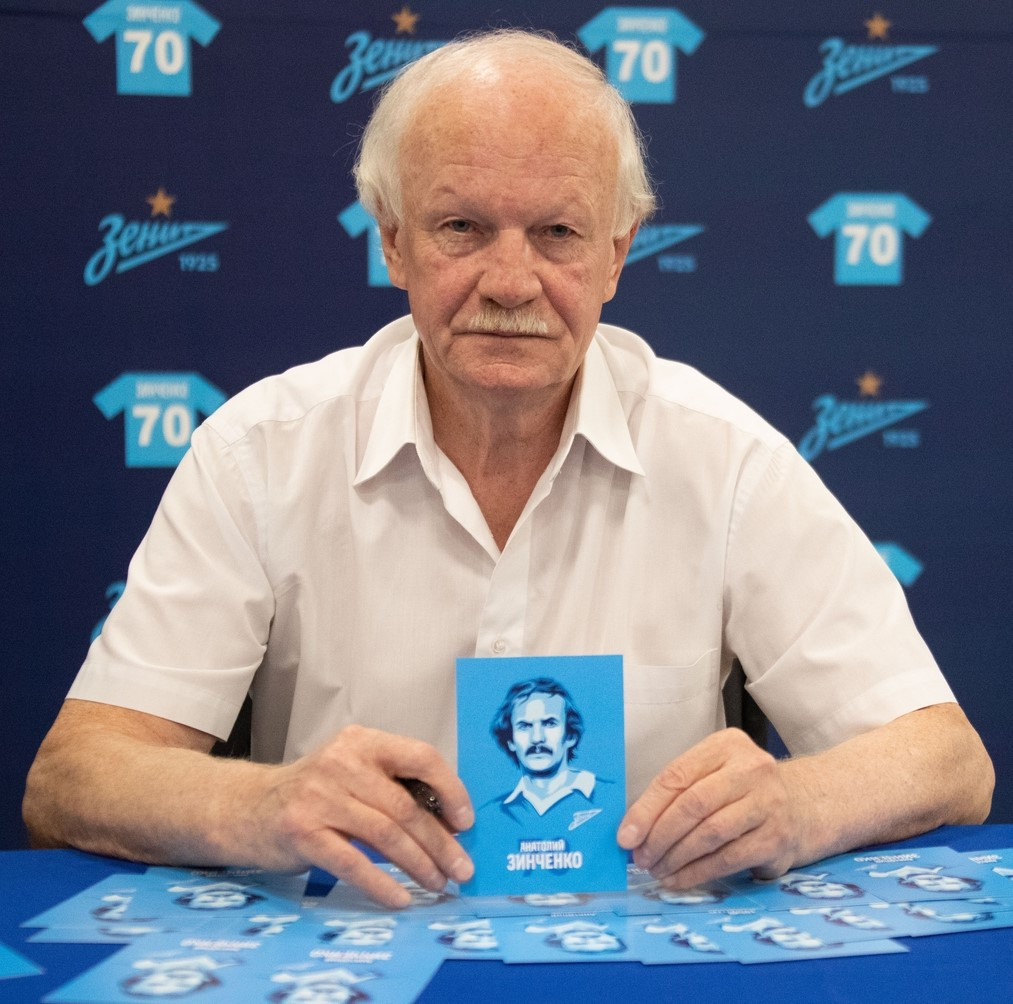
Anatoli Zinchenko

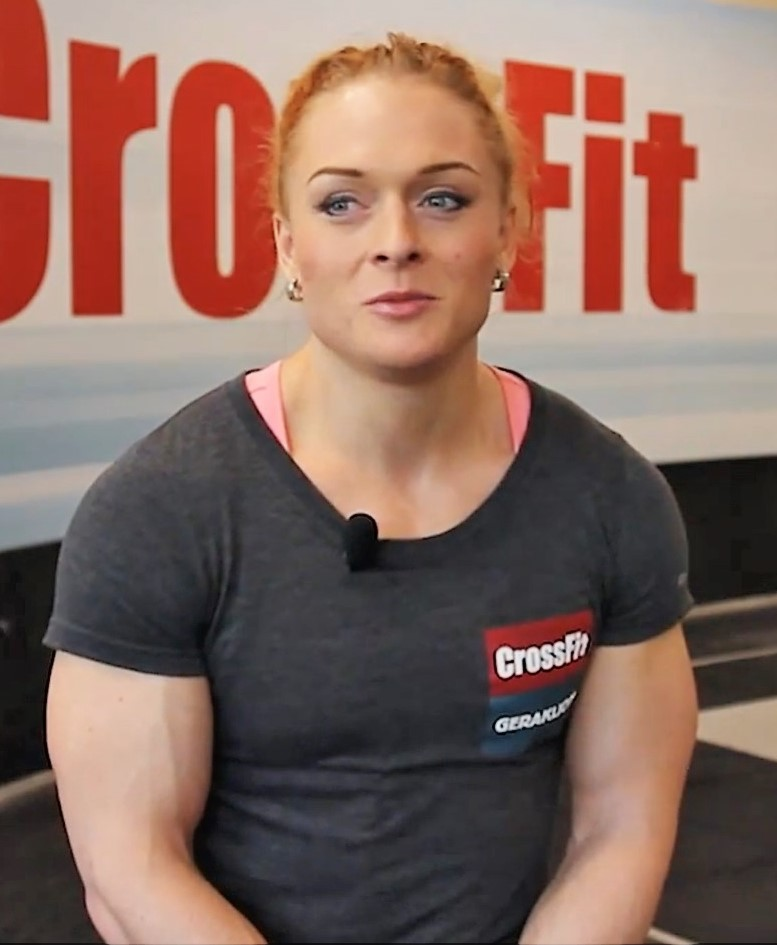
Oxana Slivenko

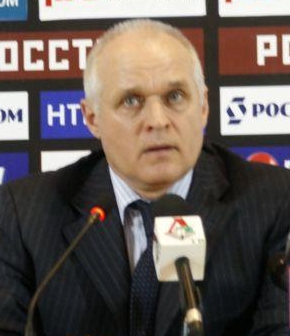
Leonid Nazarenko

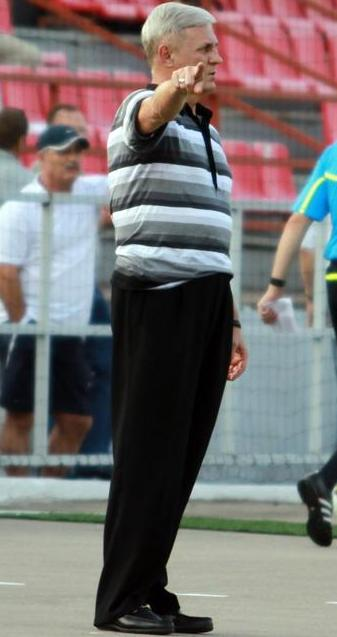
Vitaly Shevchenko

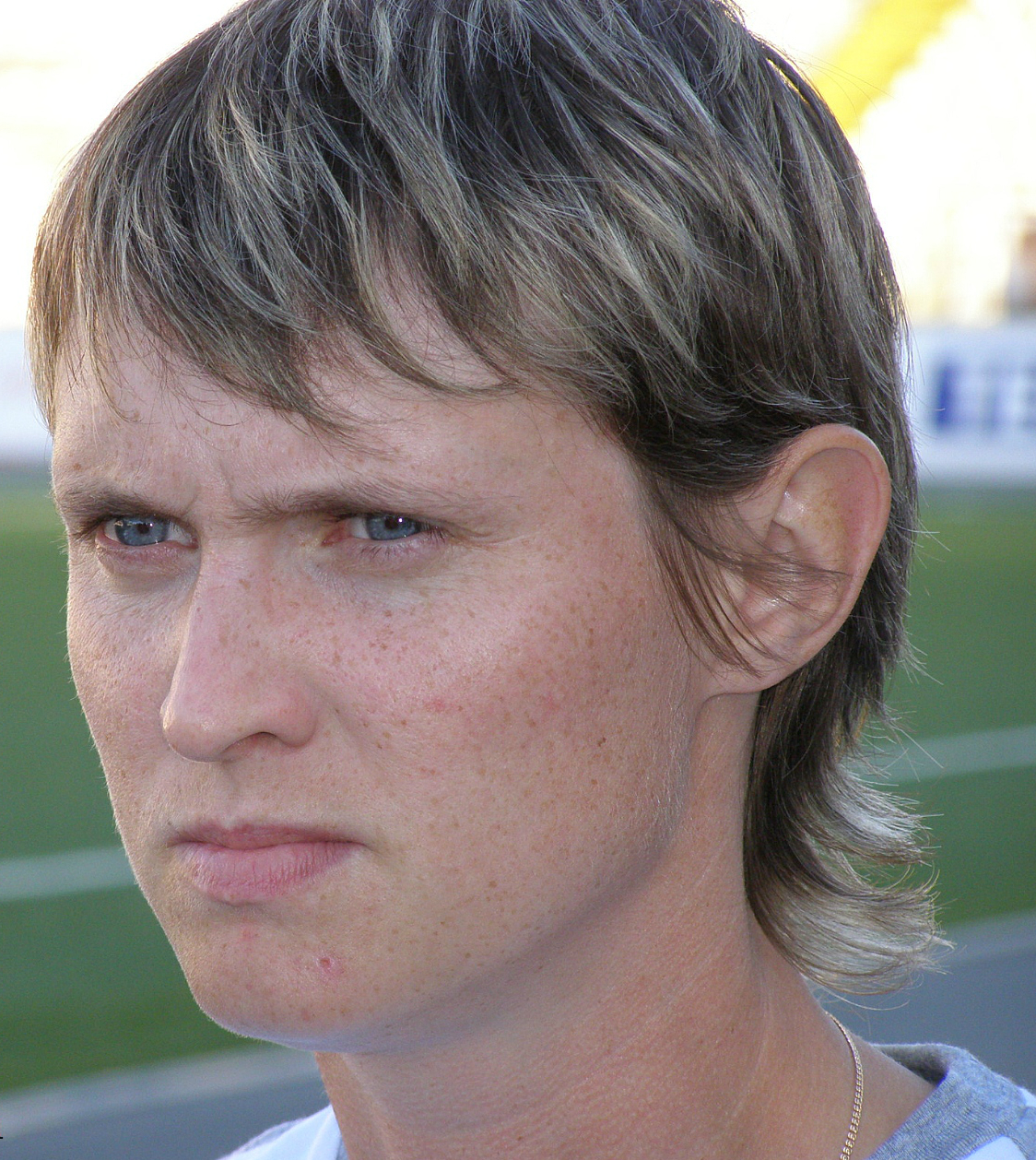
Natalya Zinchenko

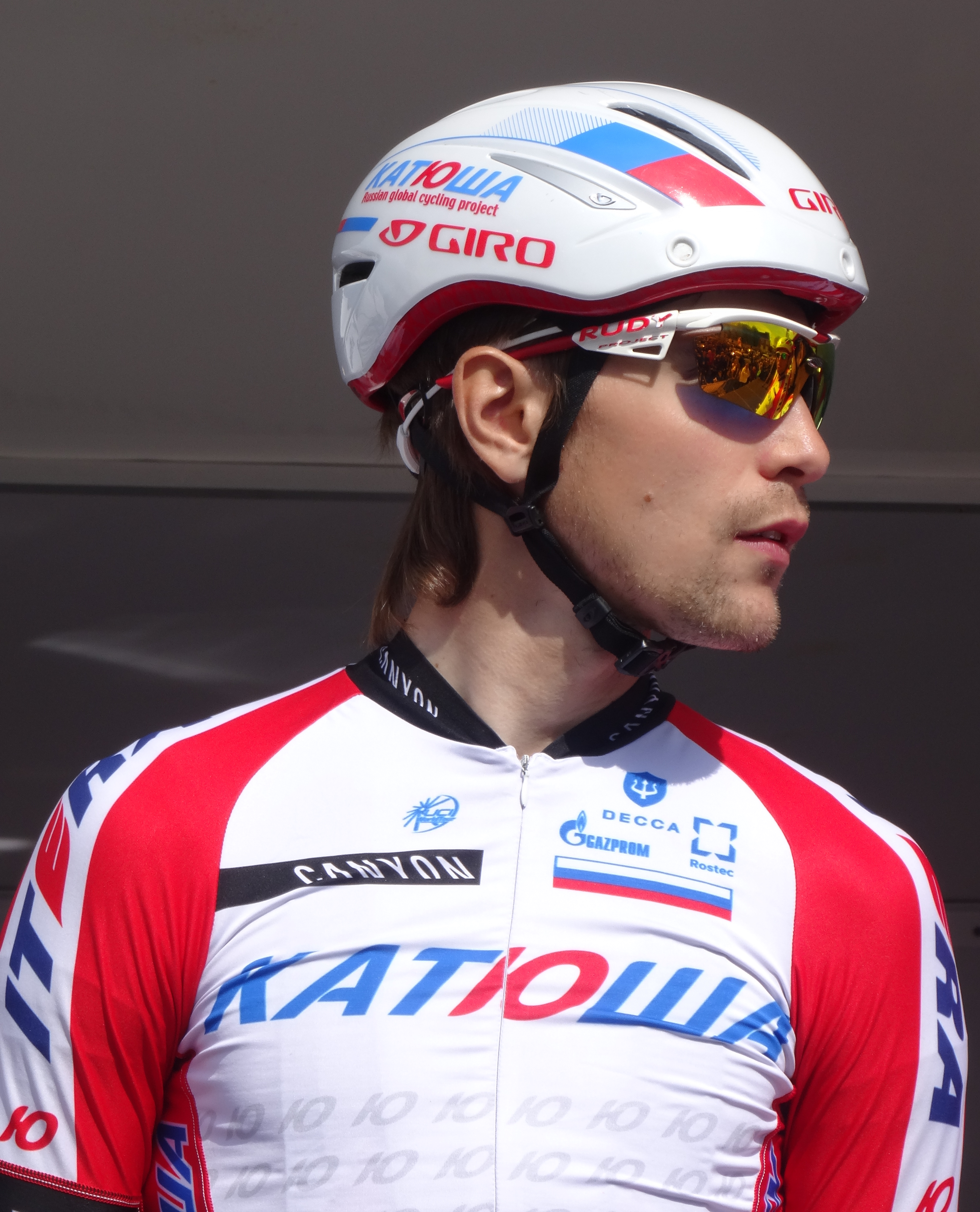
Petr Ignatenko

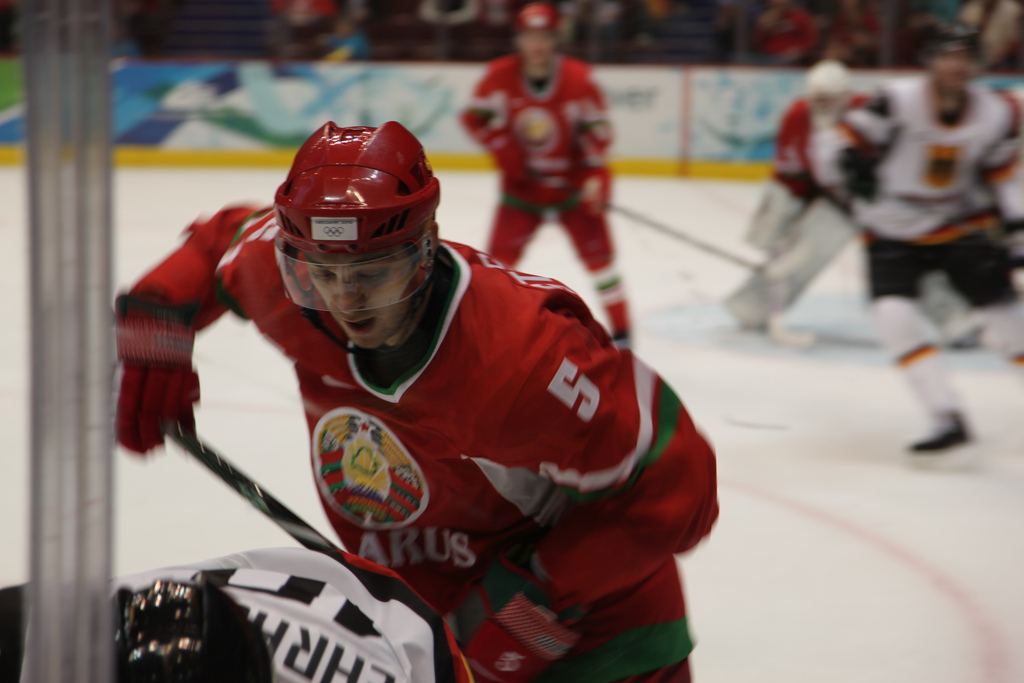
Nikolai Stasenko

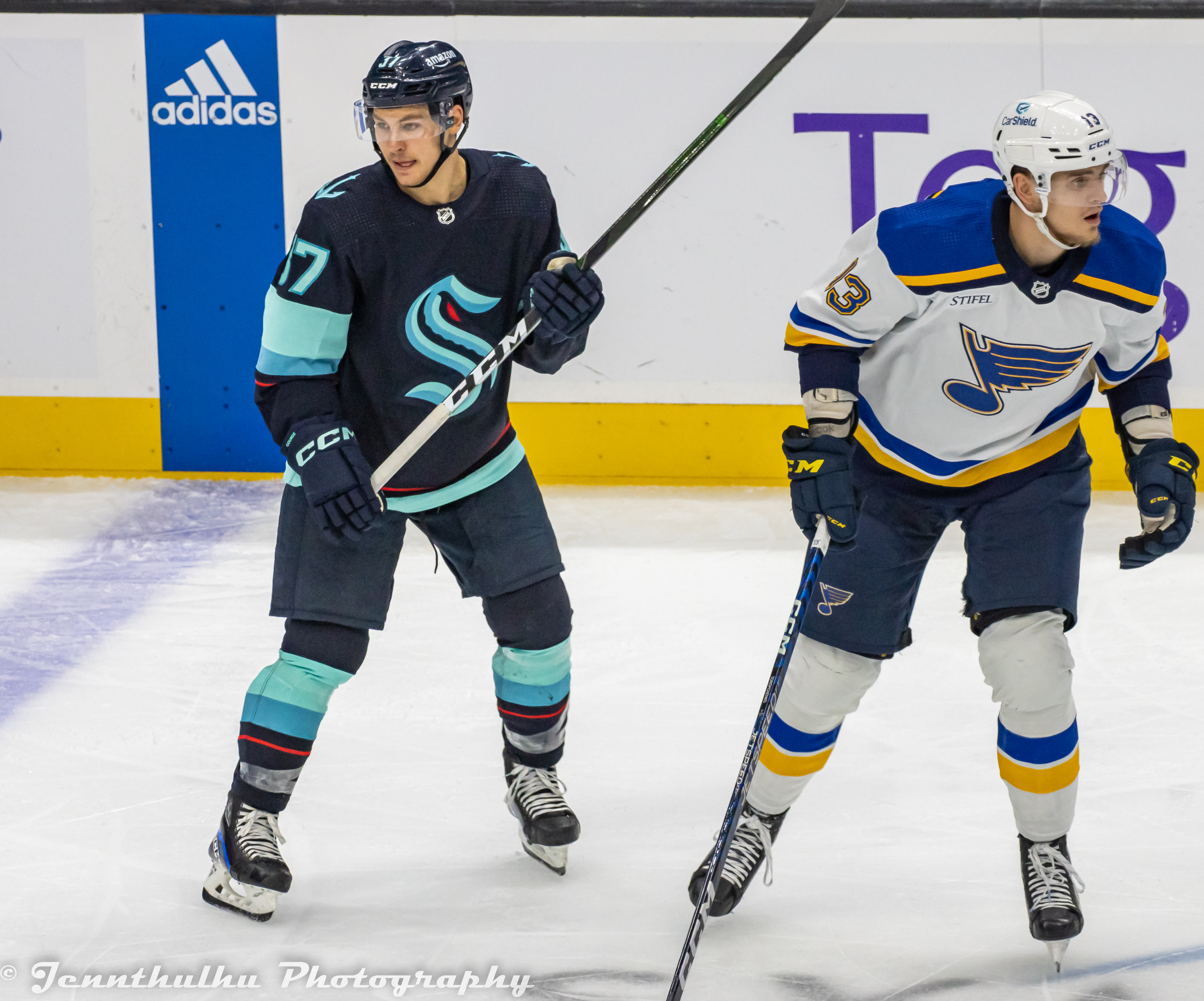
Alexey Toropchenko

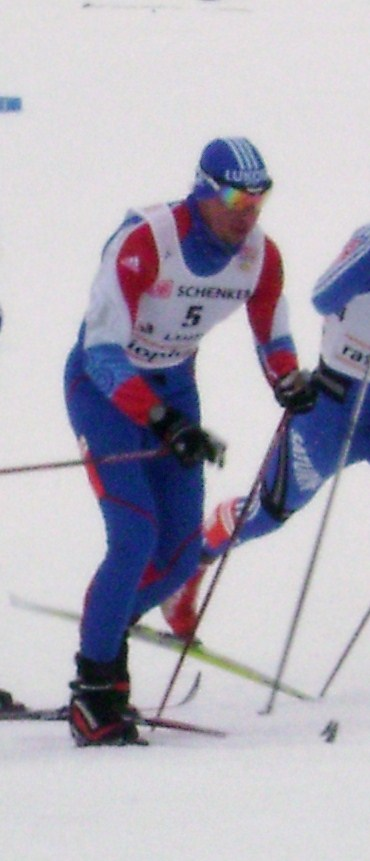
Artem Zhmurko

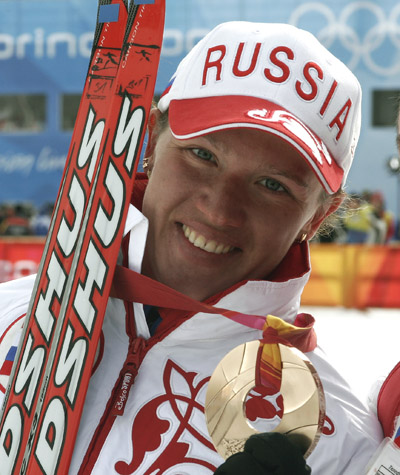
Alyona Sidko

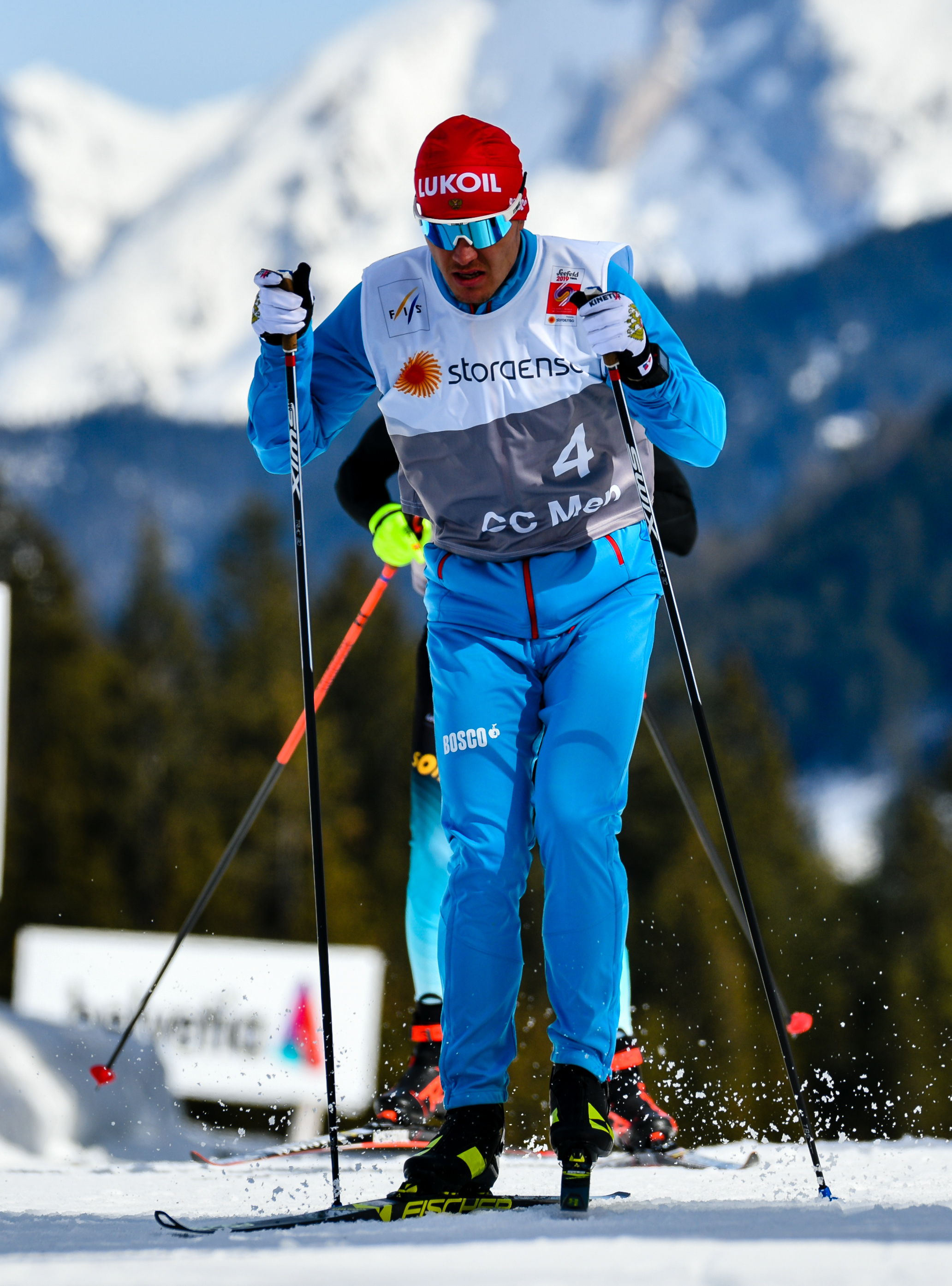
Andrey Melnichenko

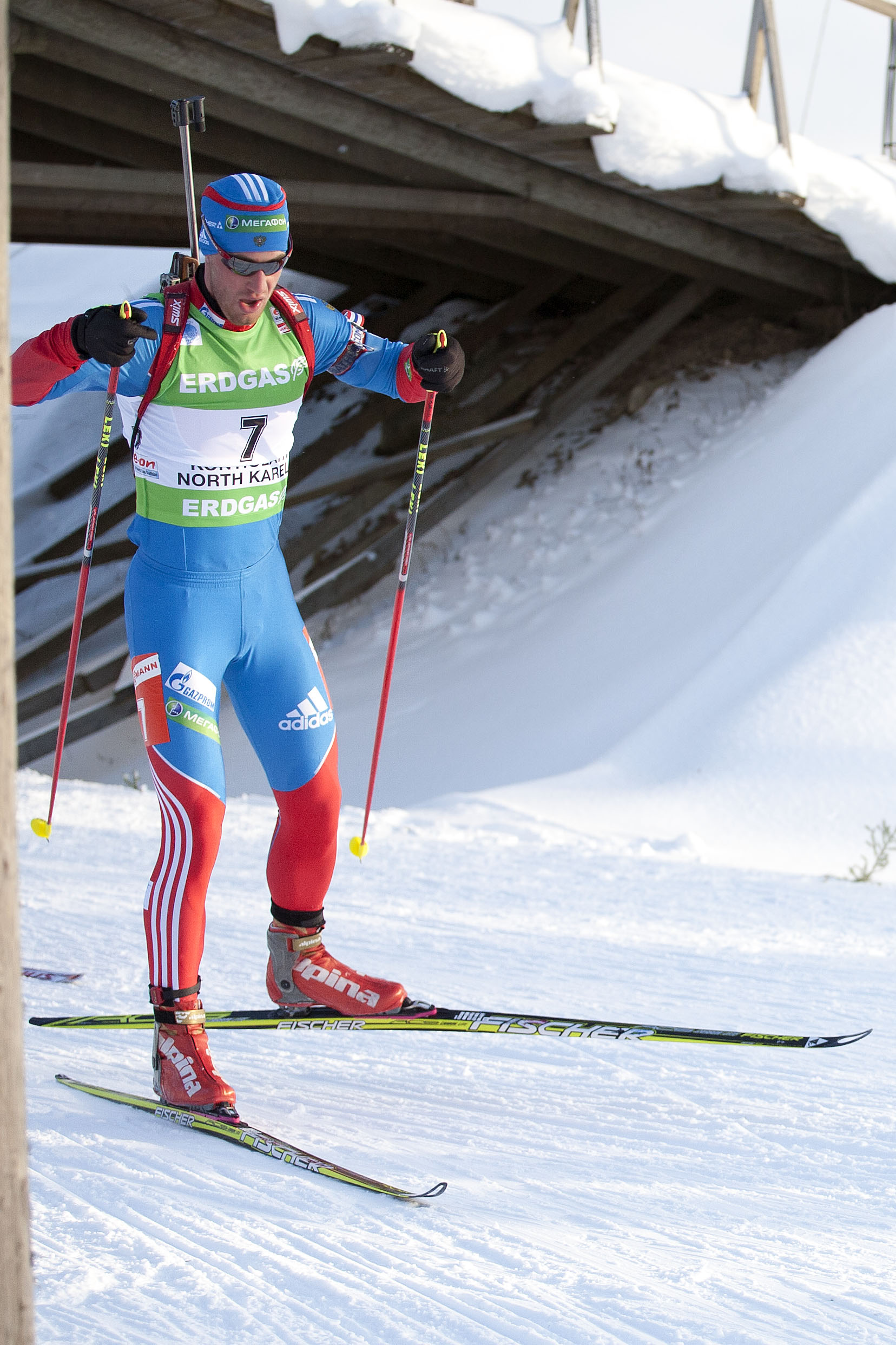
Dmitry Malyshko

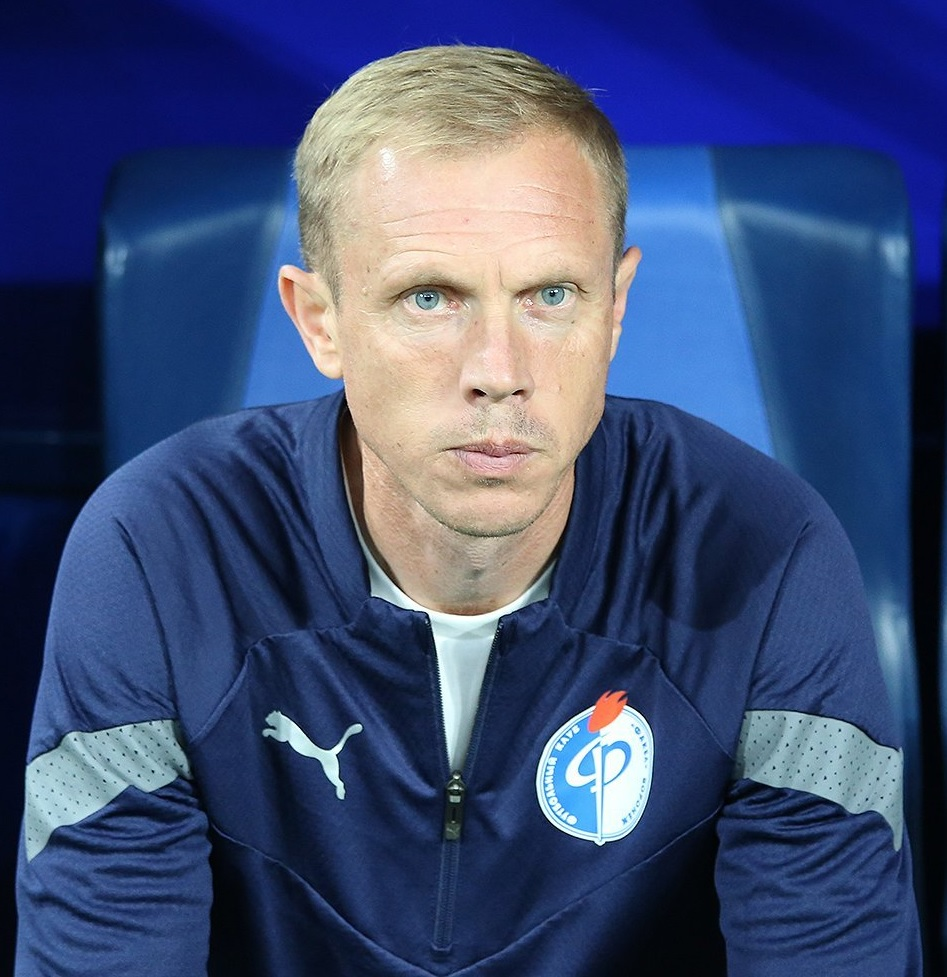
Oleg Vasilenko

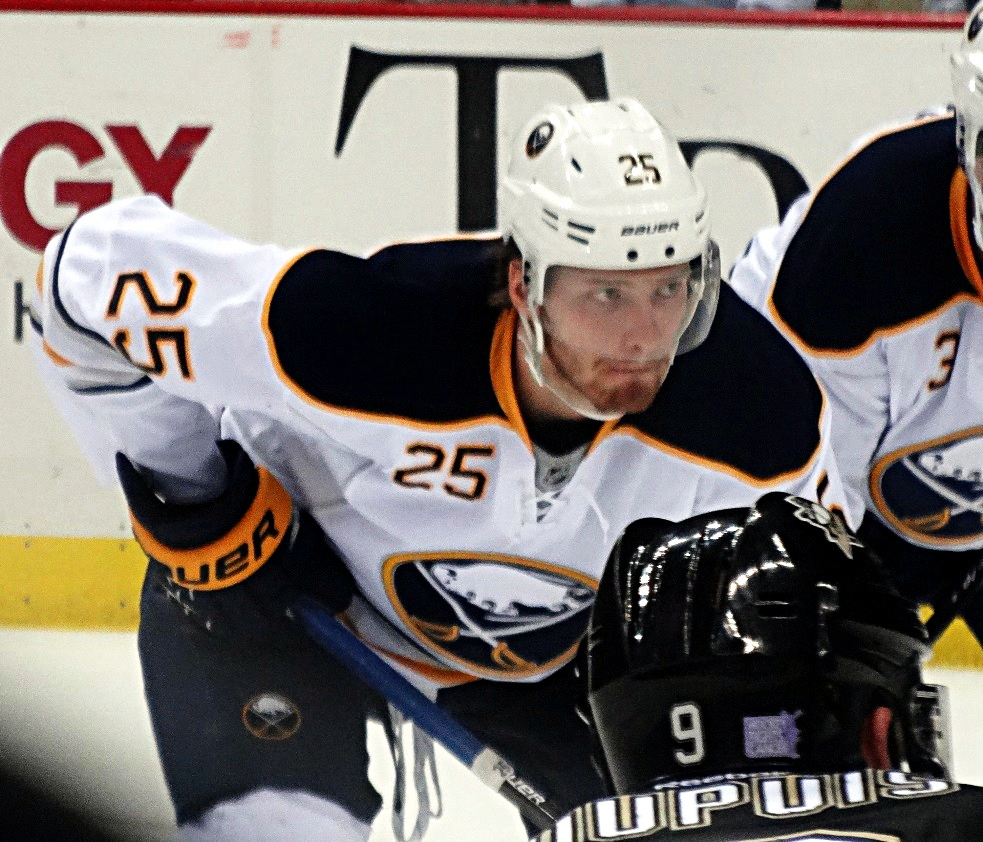
Mikhail Grigorenko

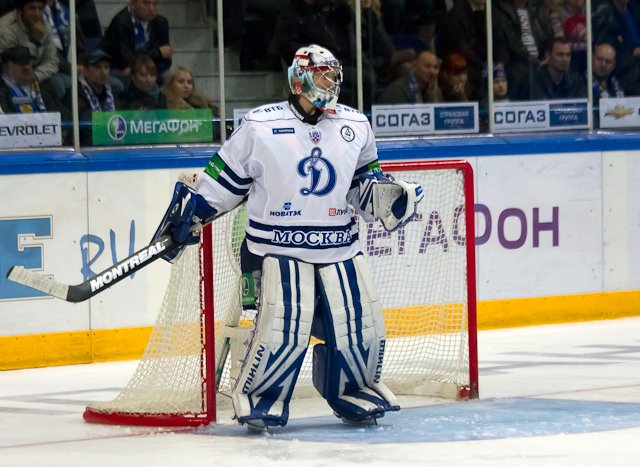
Alexander Yeryomenko

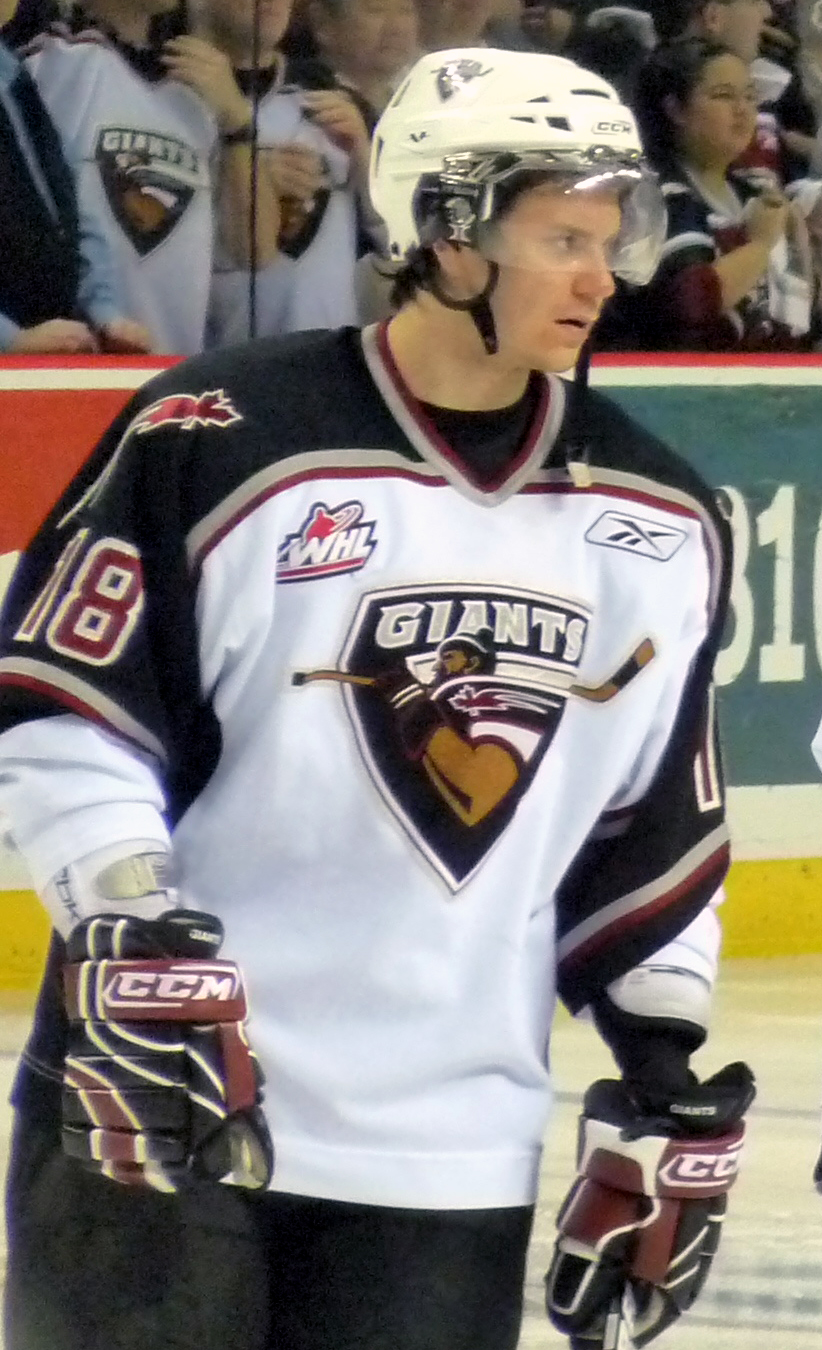
Mikhail Fisenko

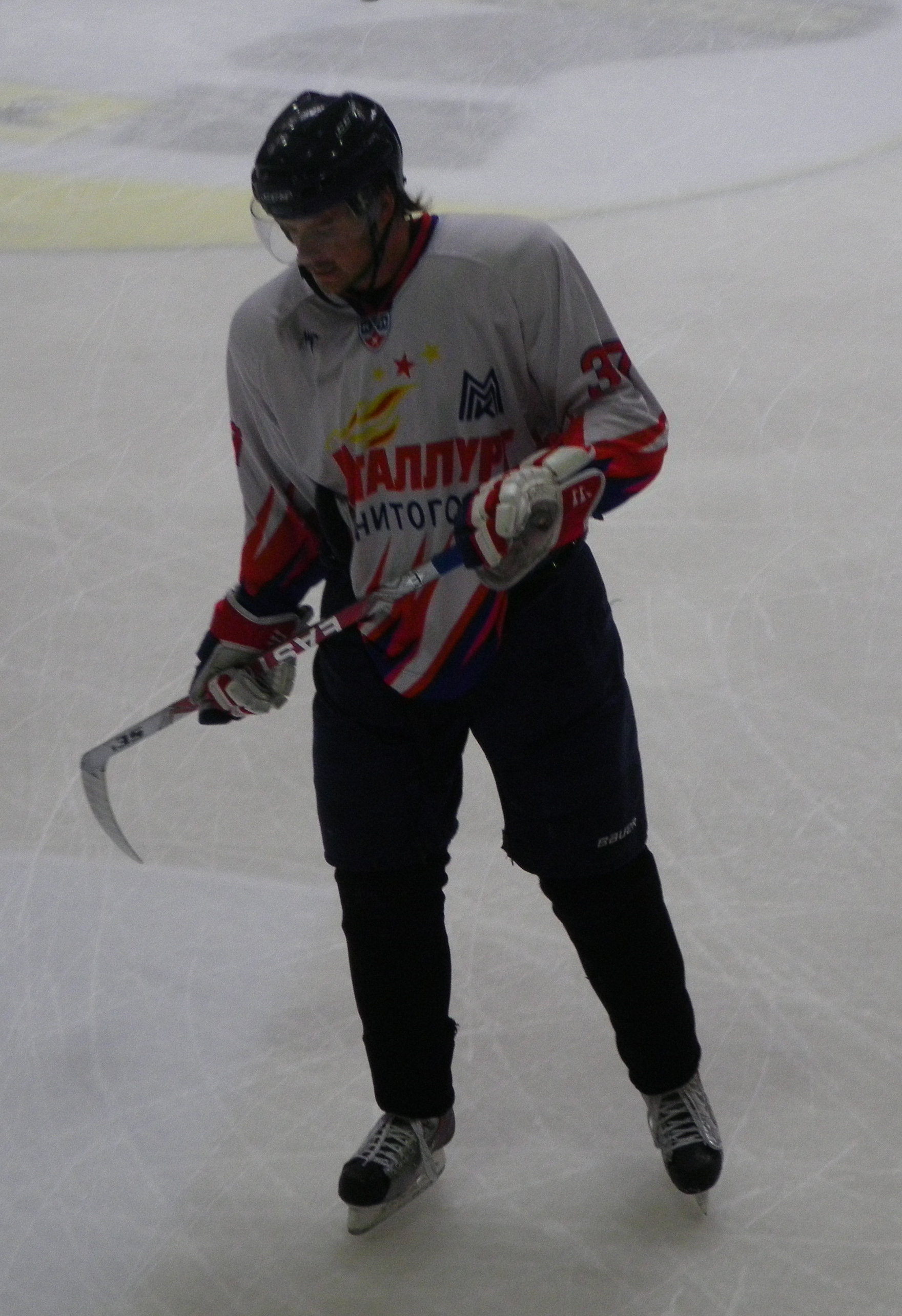
Anton Bukhanko

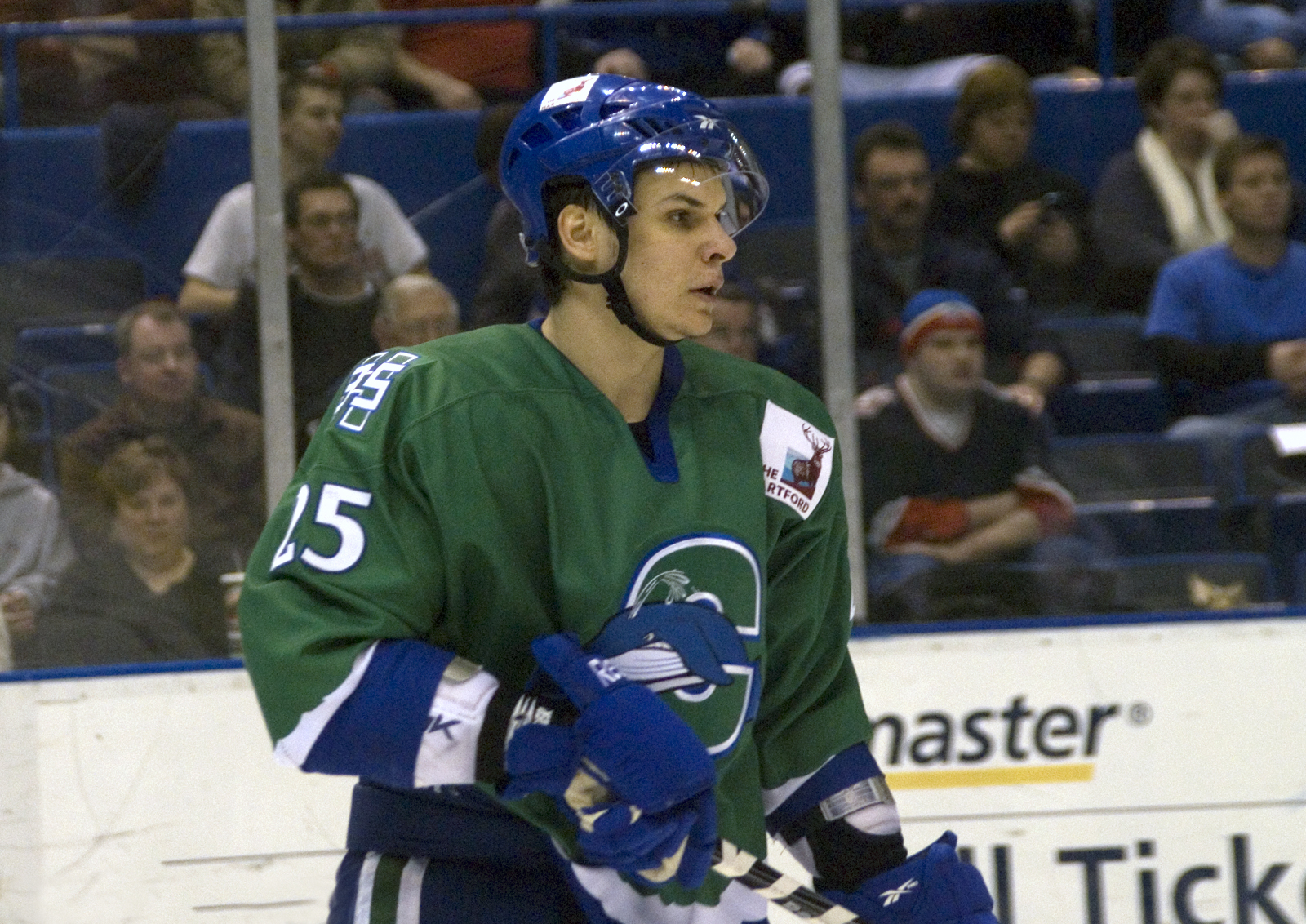
Pavel Valentenko

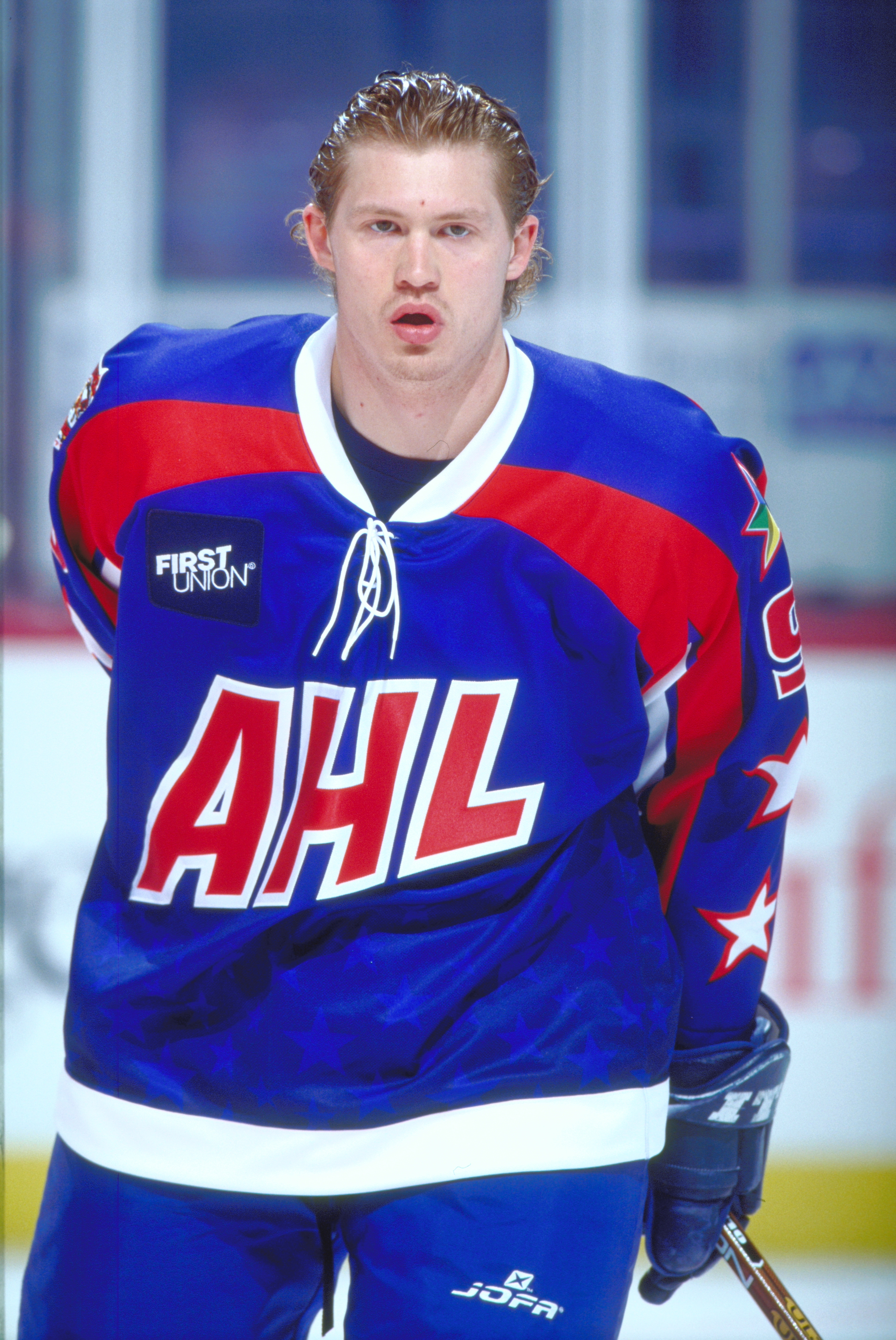
Denis Shvidki

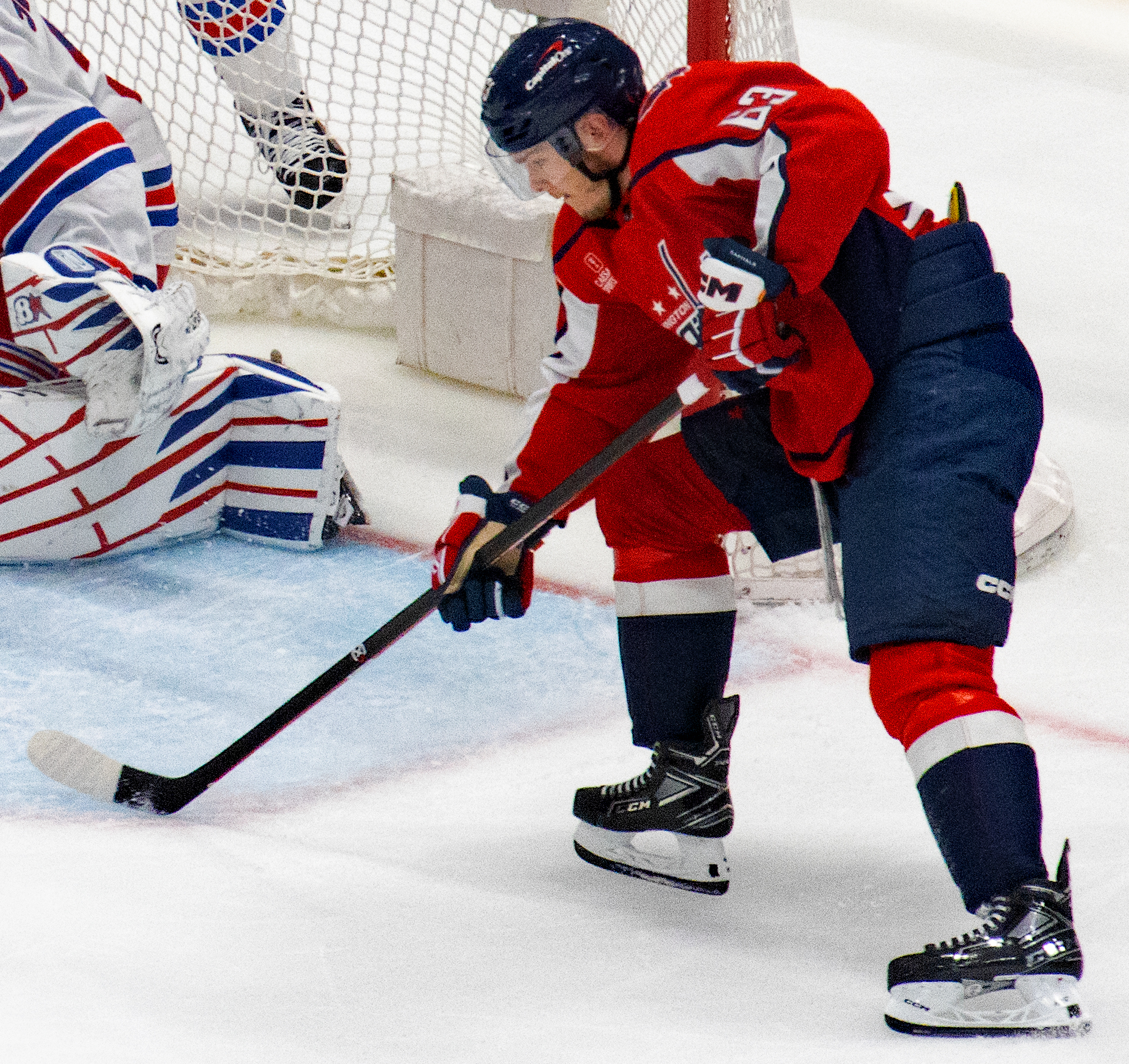
Ivan Miroshnichenko

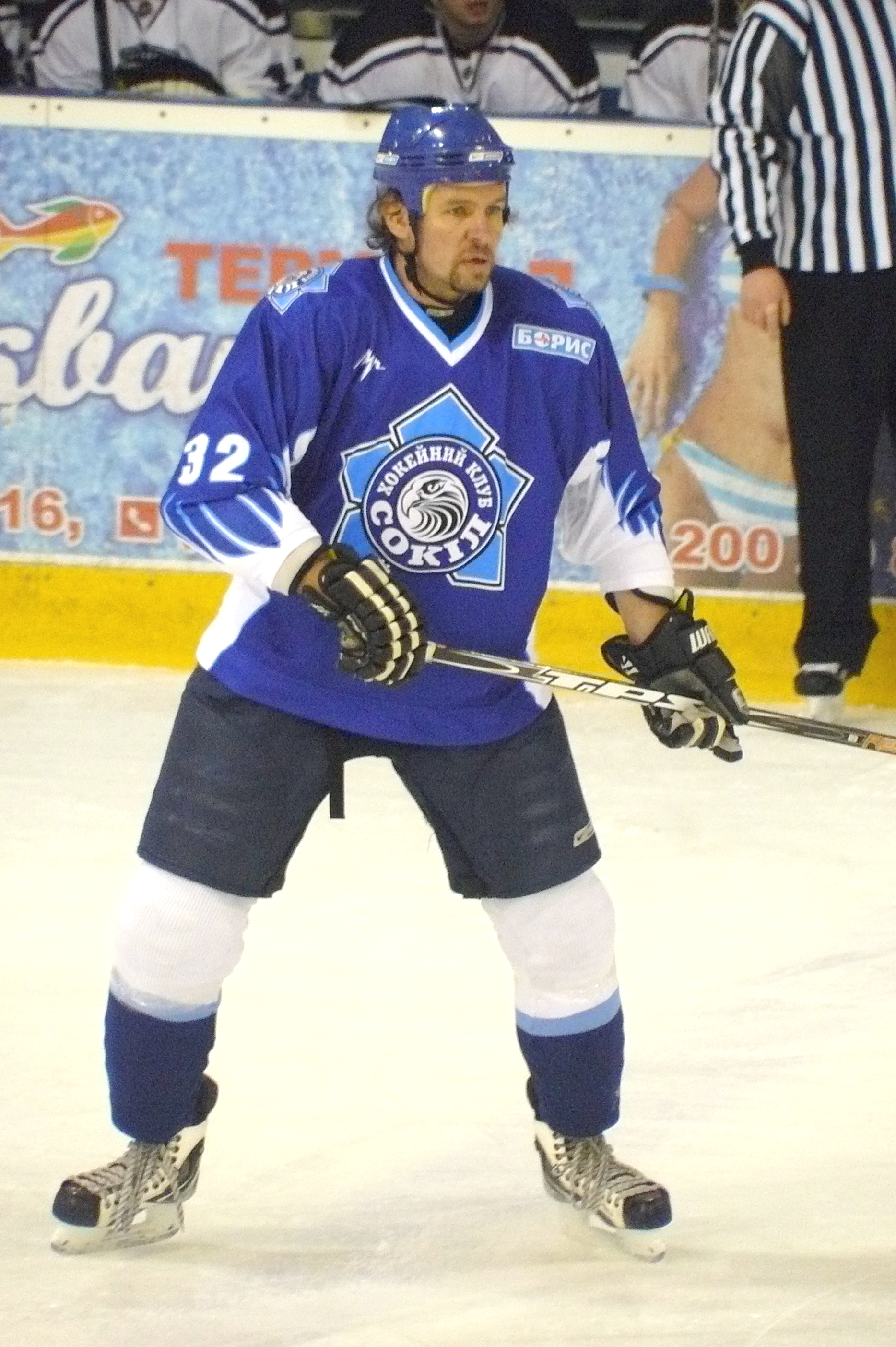
Yuri Gunko

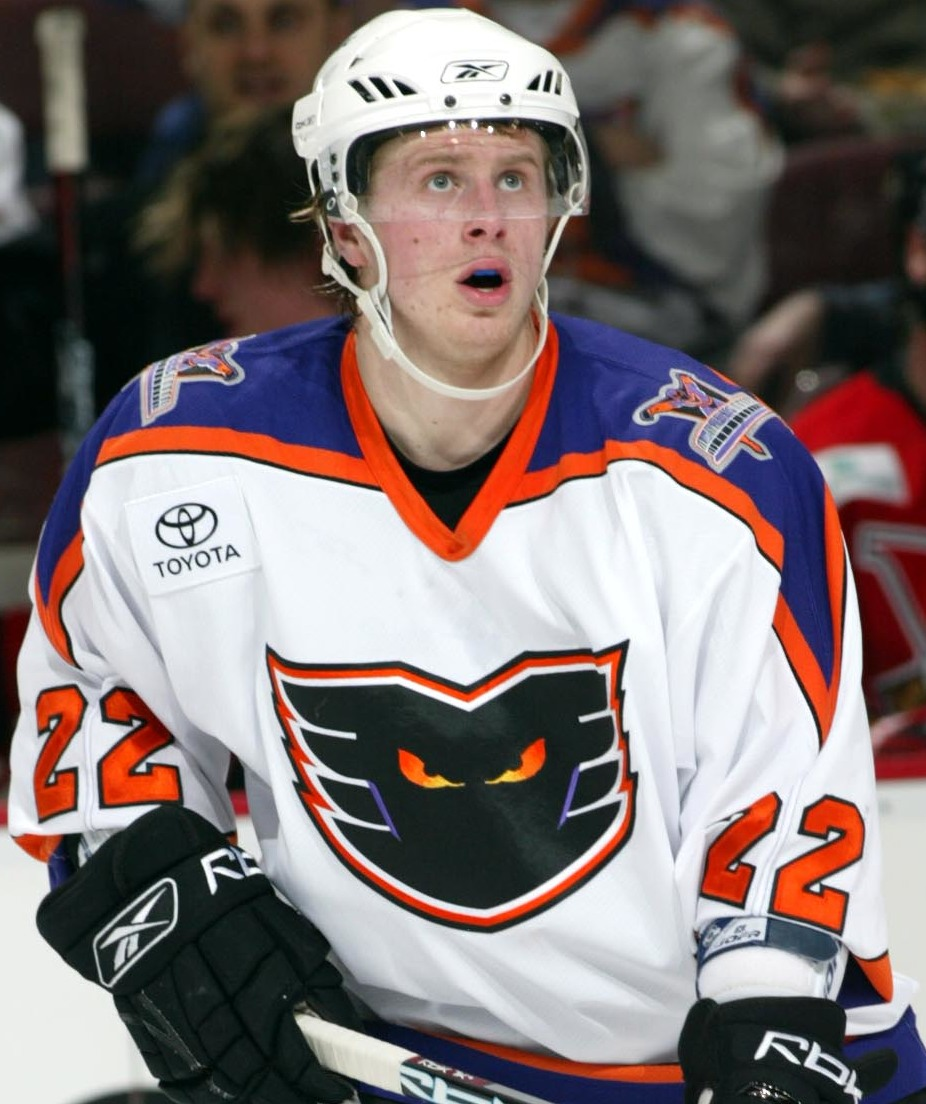
Denis Tolpeko

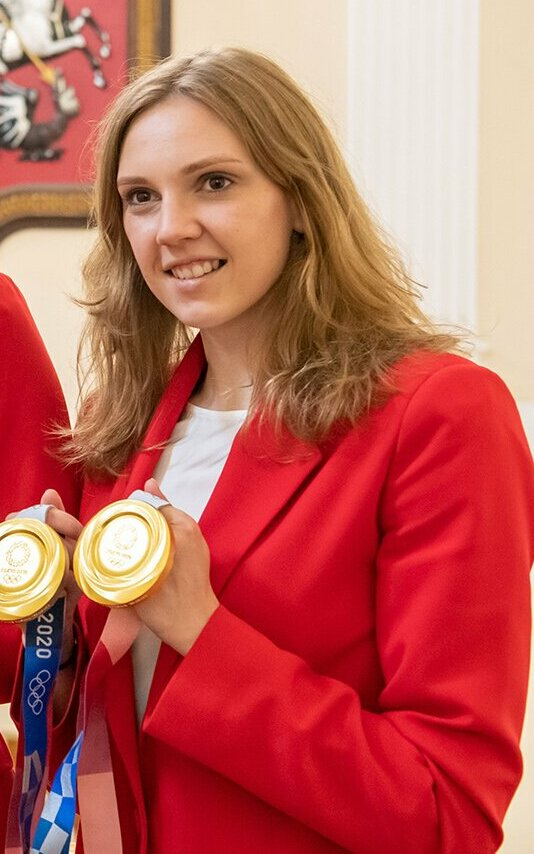
Svetlana Kolesnichenko

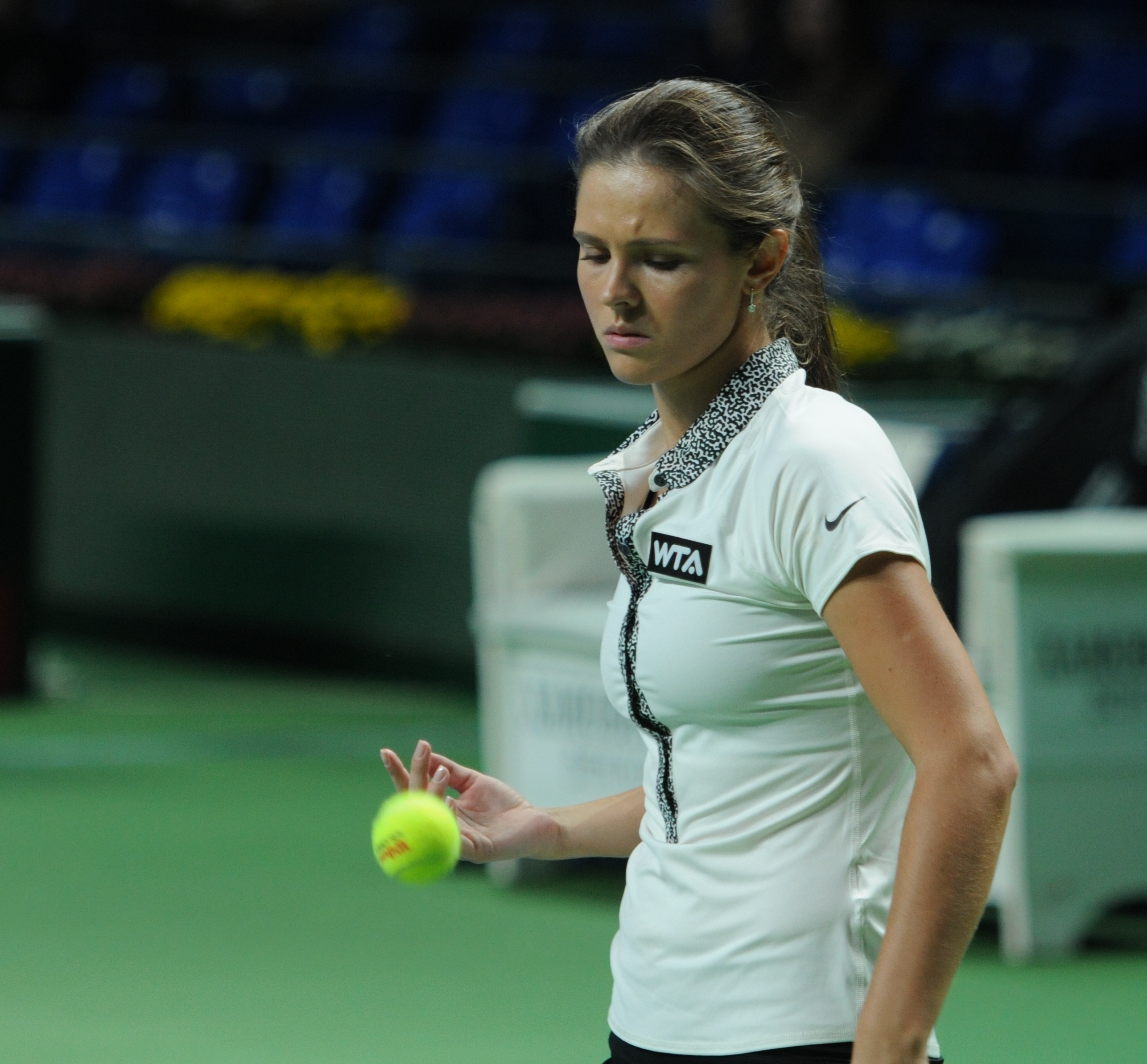
Anastasia Bukhanko

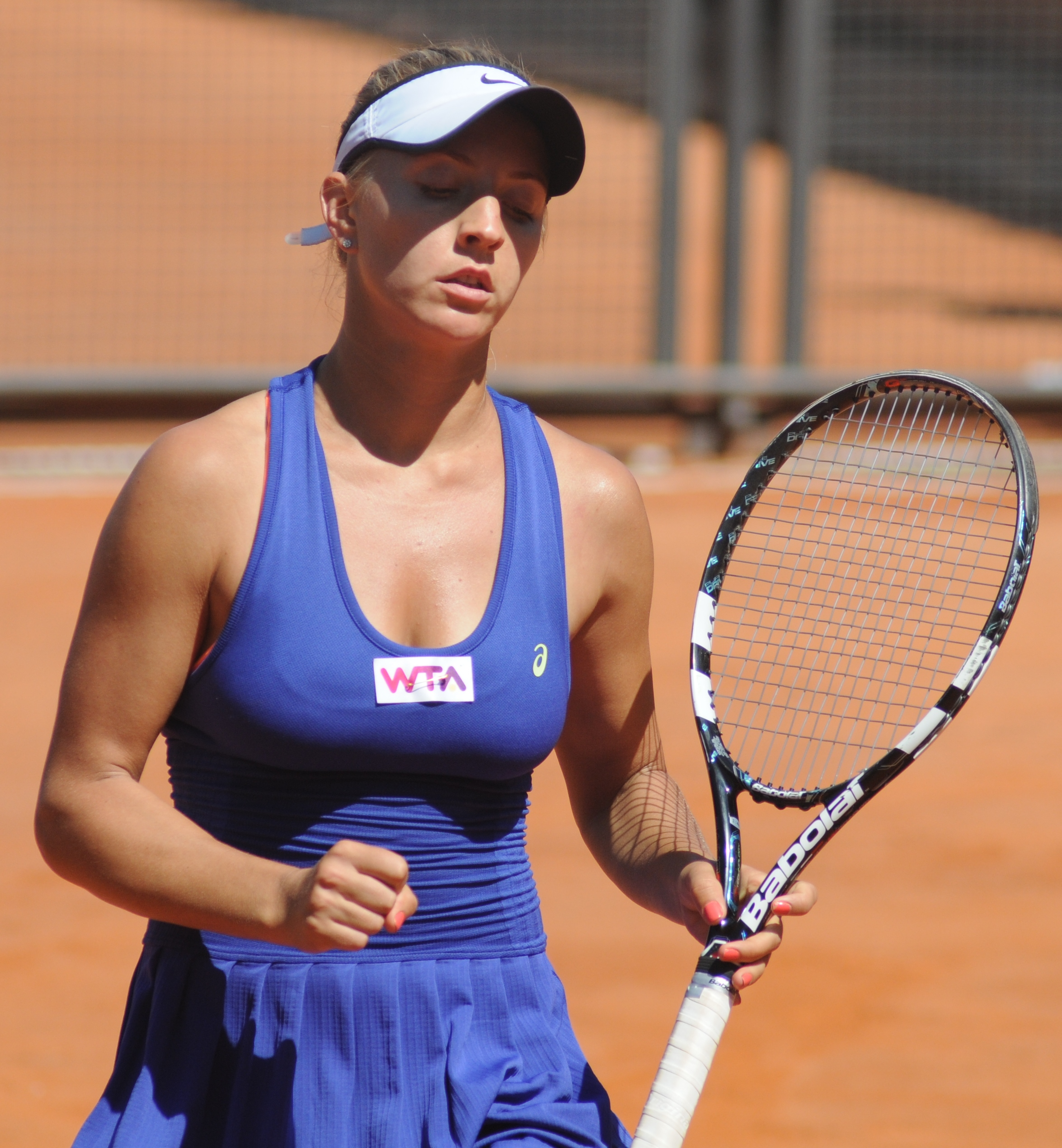
Marina Shamayko

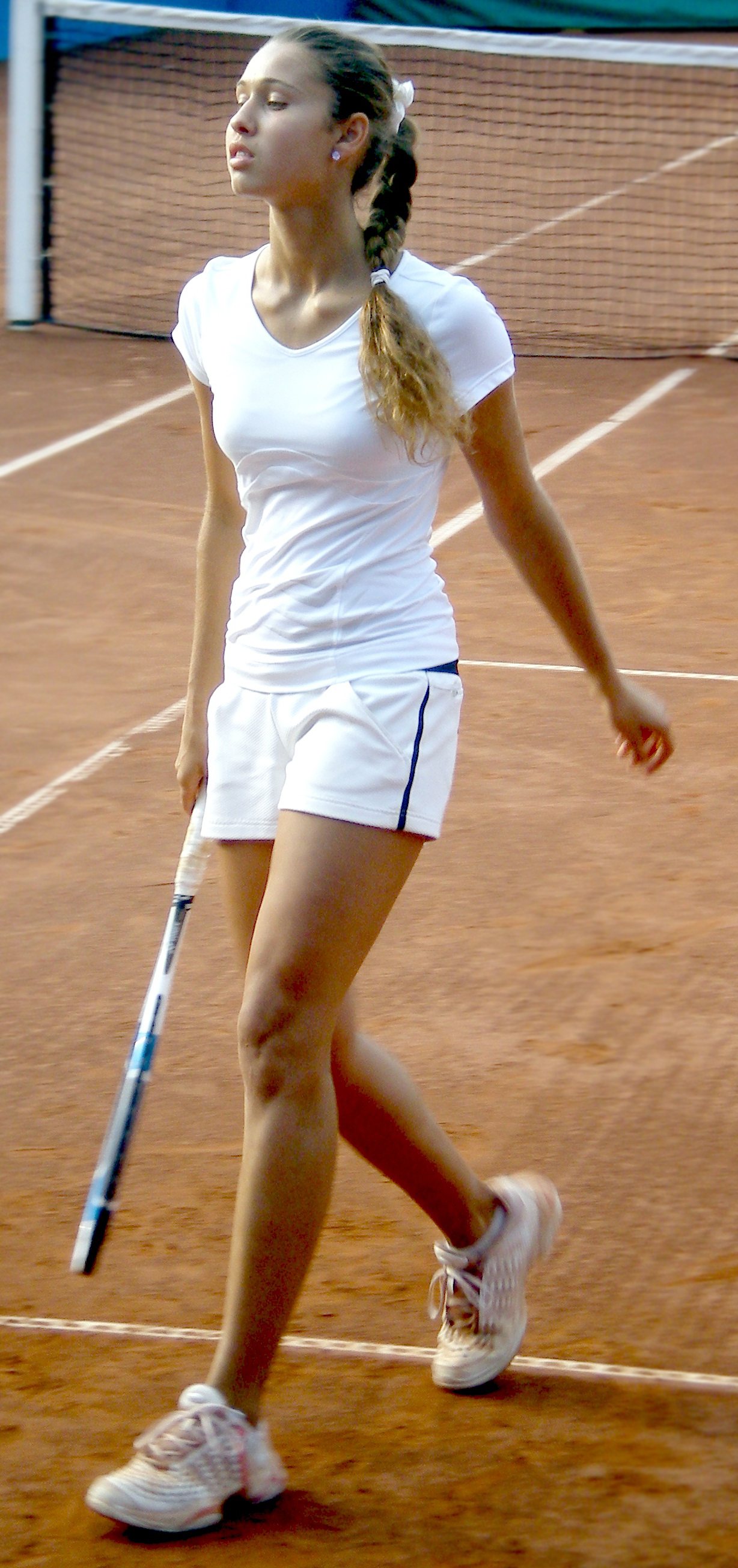
Vitalia Diatchenko

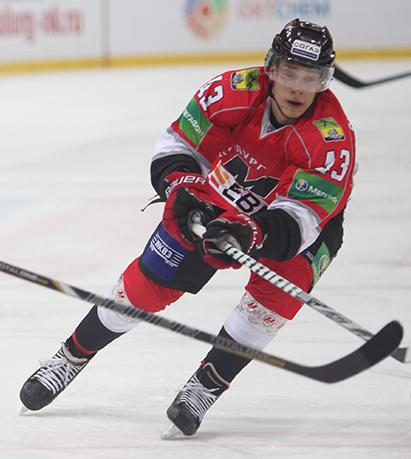
Nikolai Skladnichenko

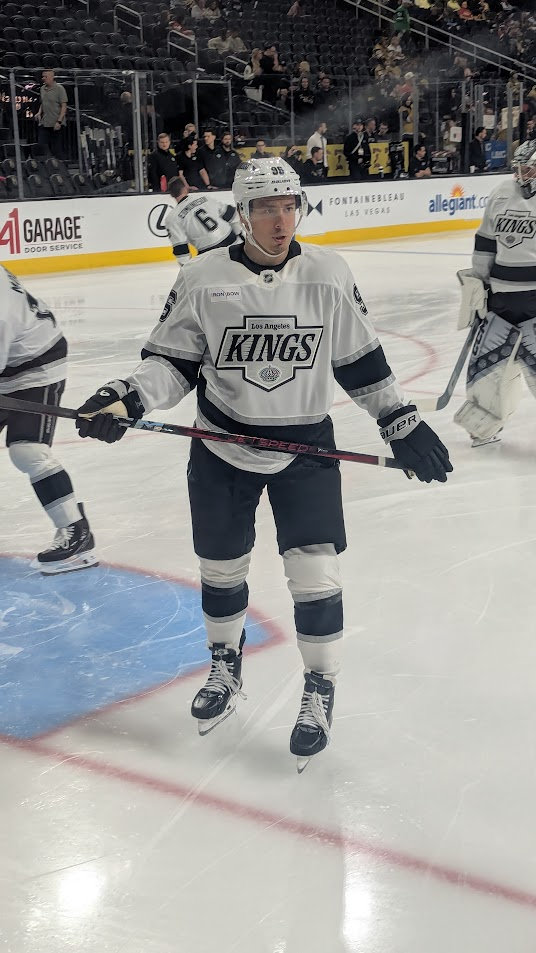
Andrei Kuzmenko

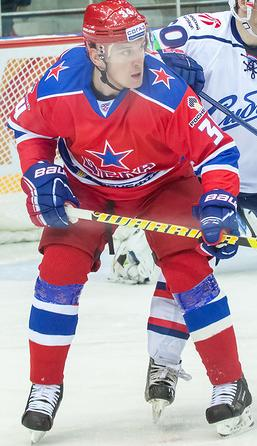
Igor Grigorenko

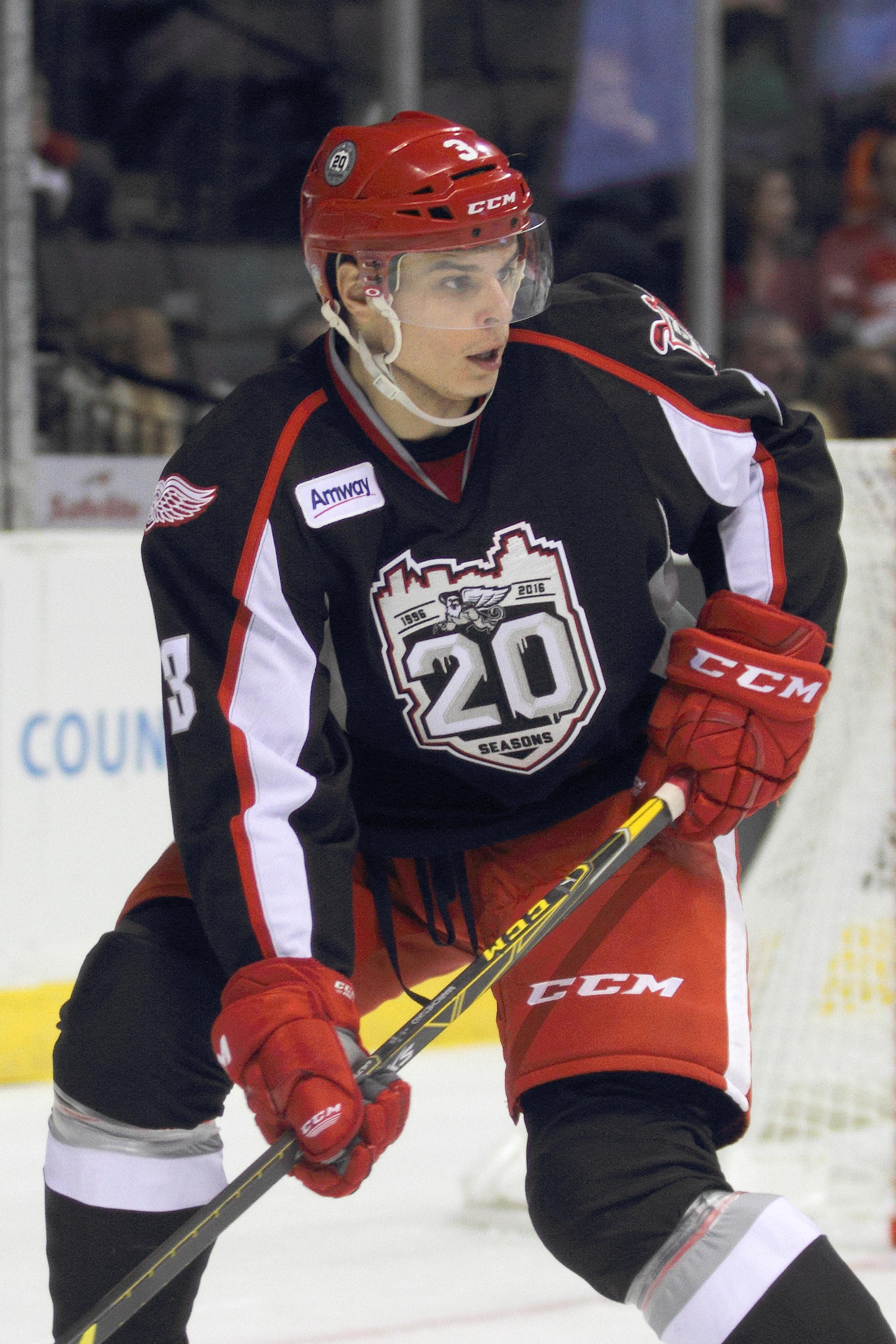
Alexey Marchenko

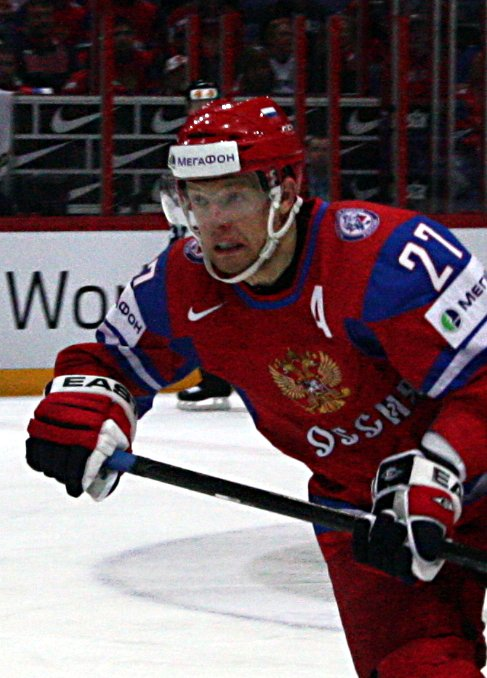
Alexei Tereshchenko

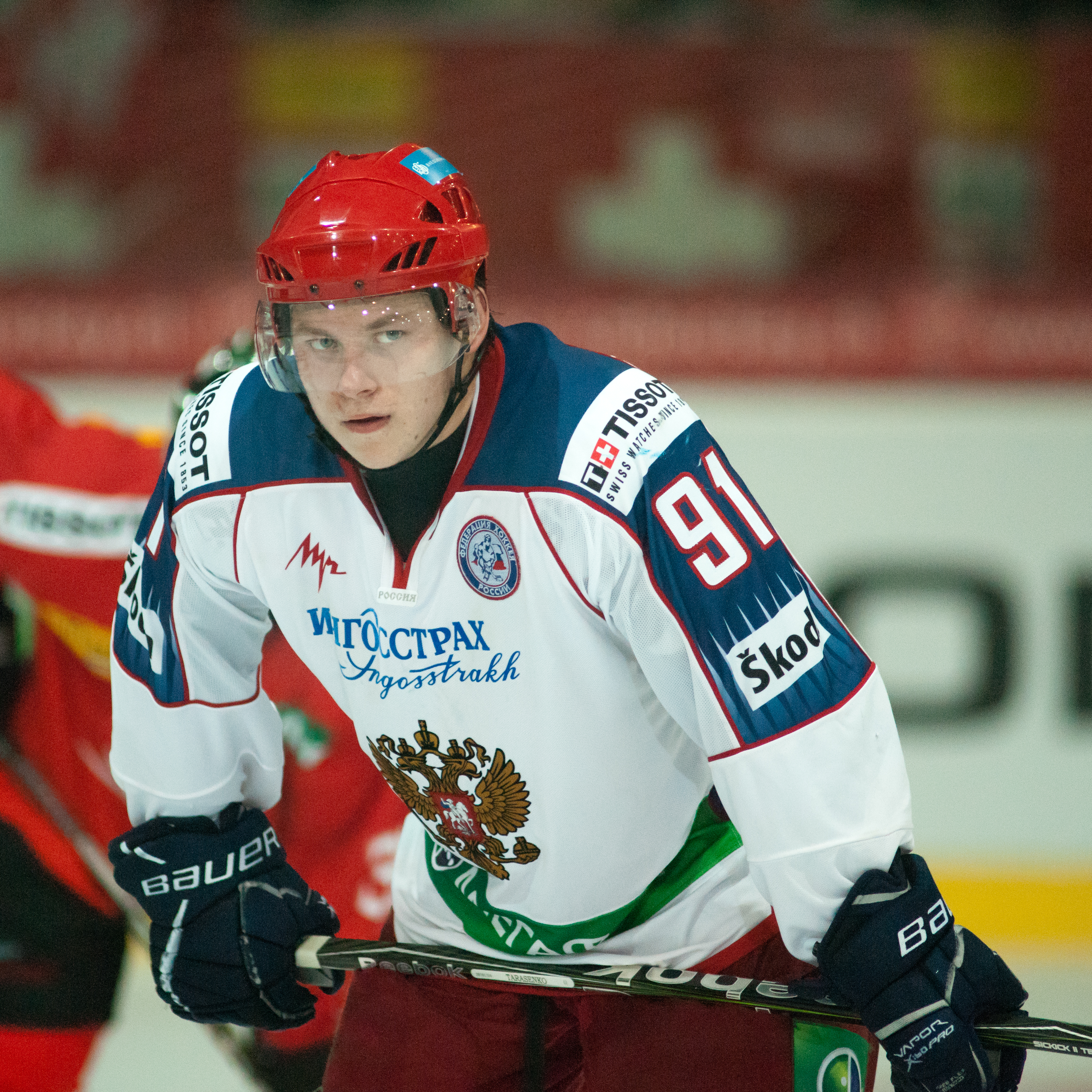
Vladimir Tarasenko

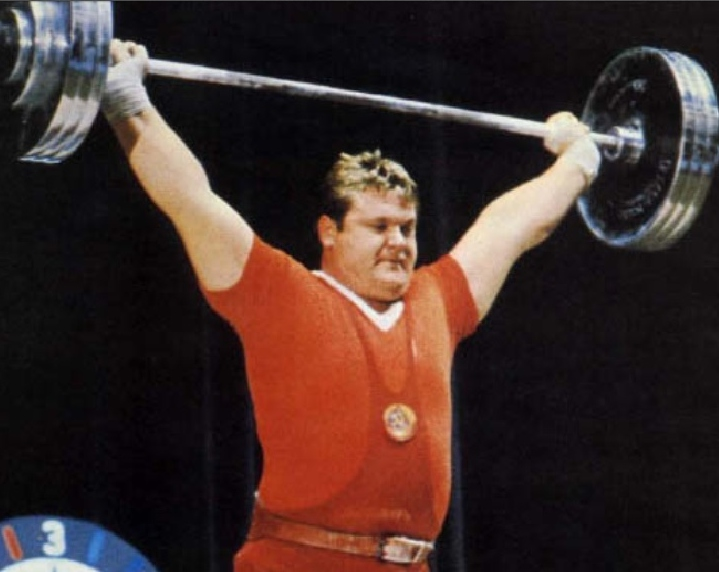
Leonid Zhabotinsky

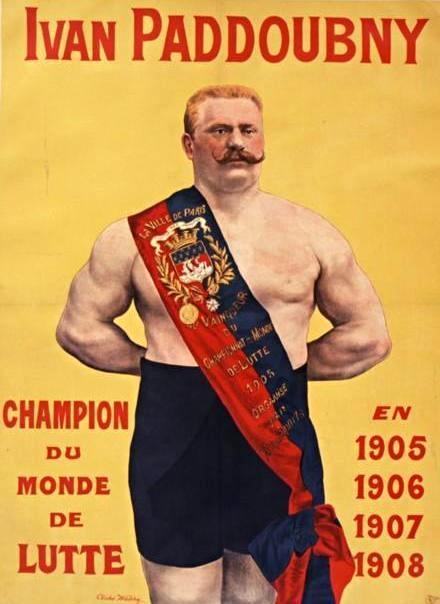
Ivan Poddubny

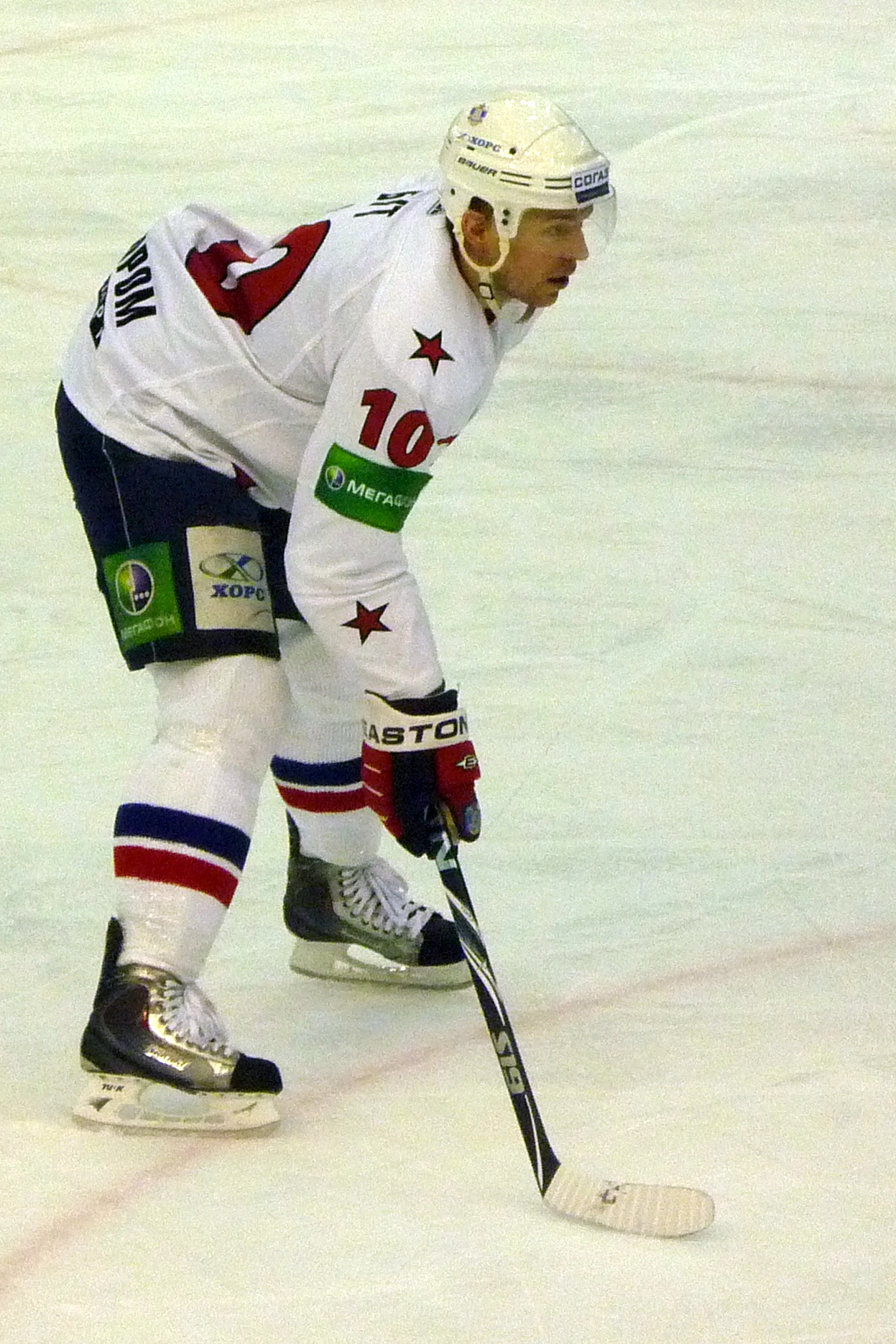
Anton But

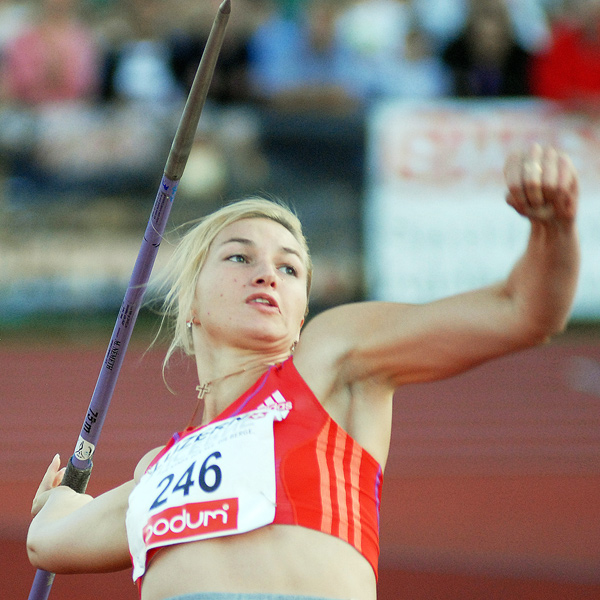
Vera Rebrik

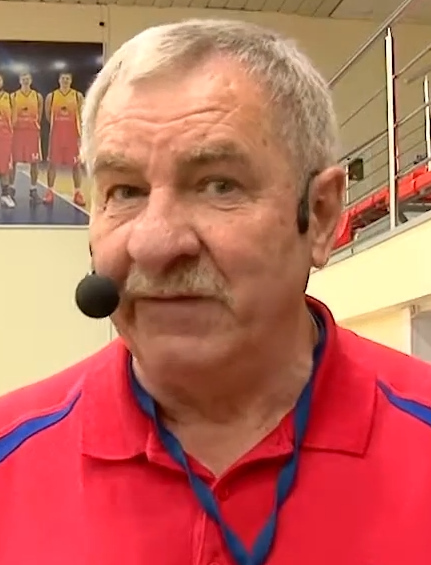
Ivan Edeshko

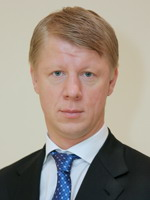
Konstantin Yeryomenko

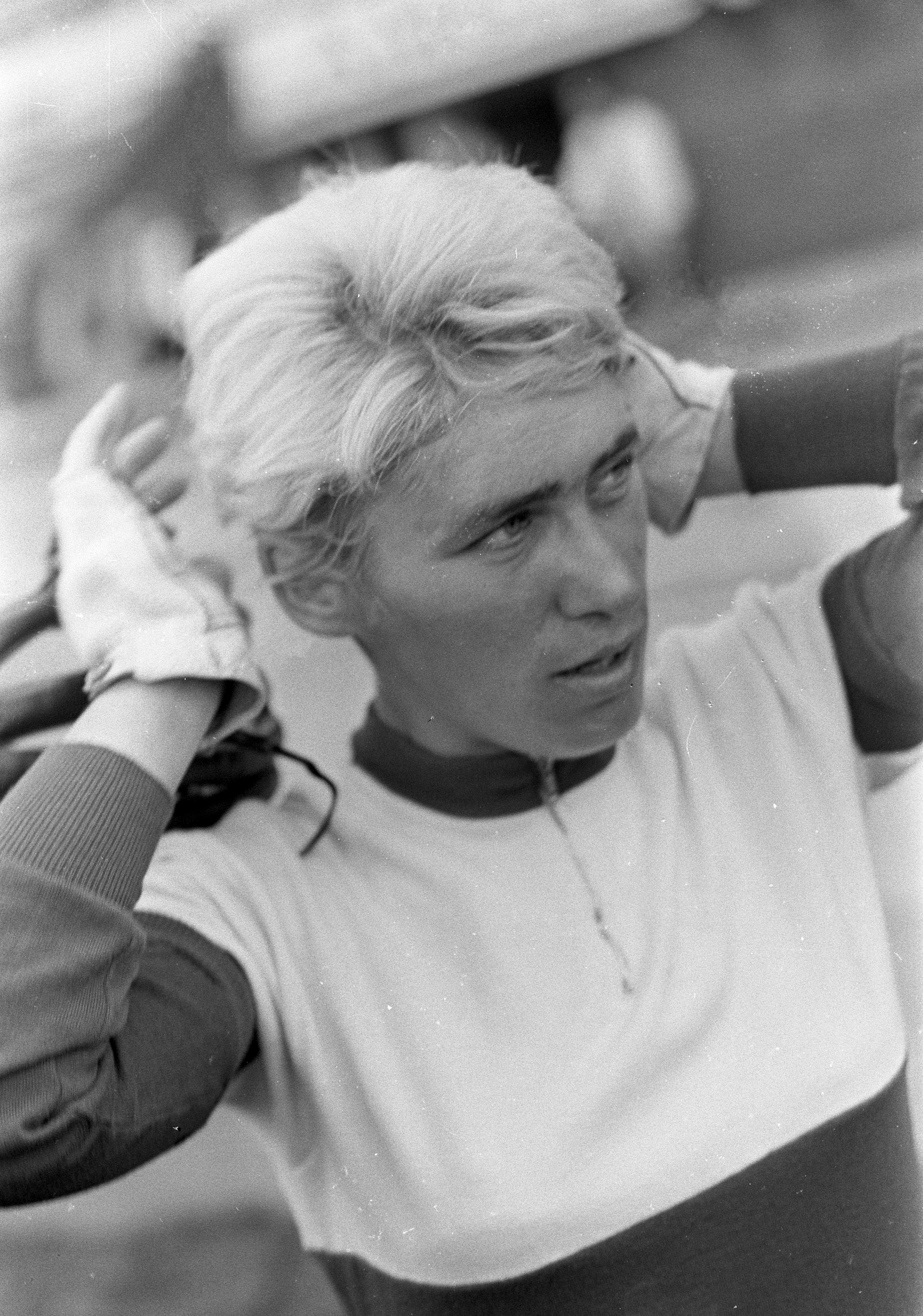
Irina Kirichenko

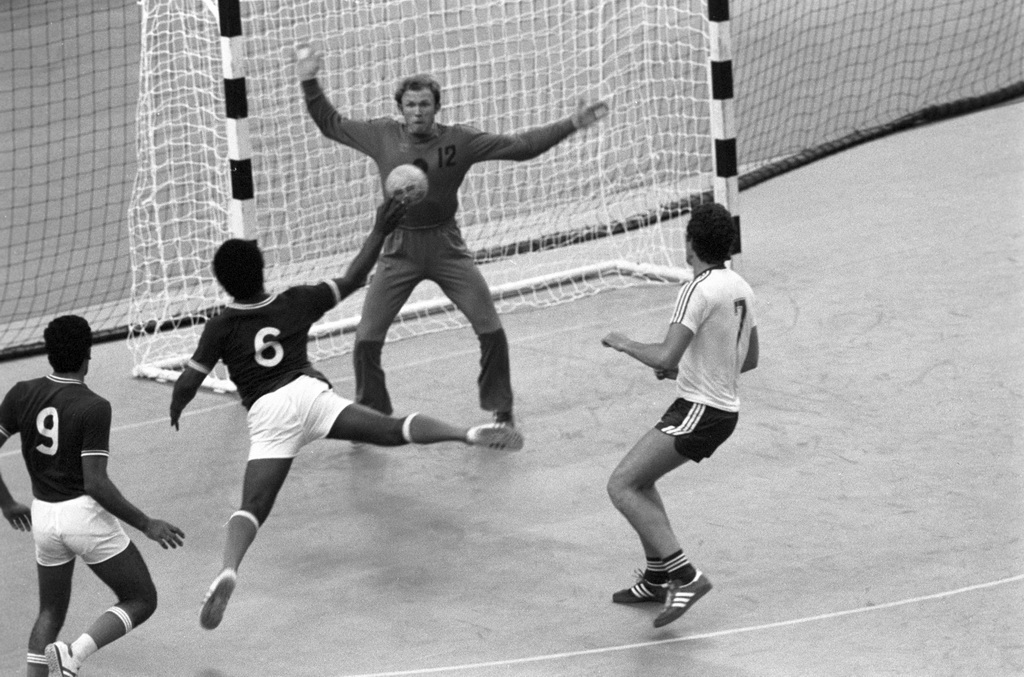
Mykhaylo Ishchenko

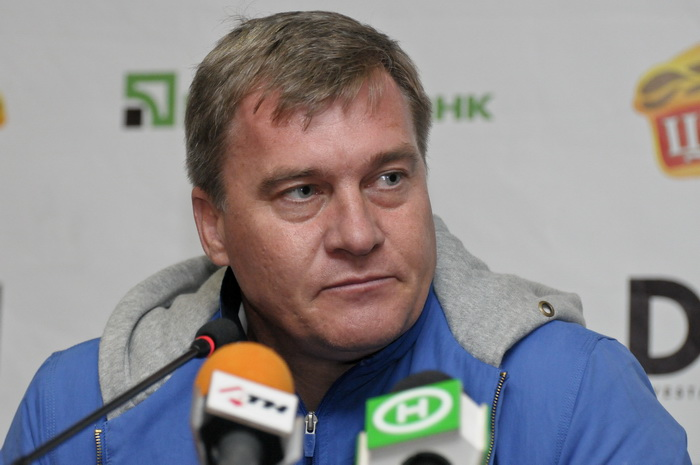
Oleh Leshchynskyi

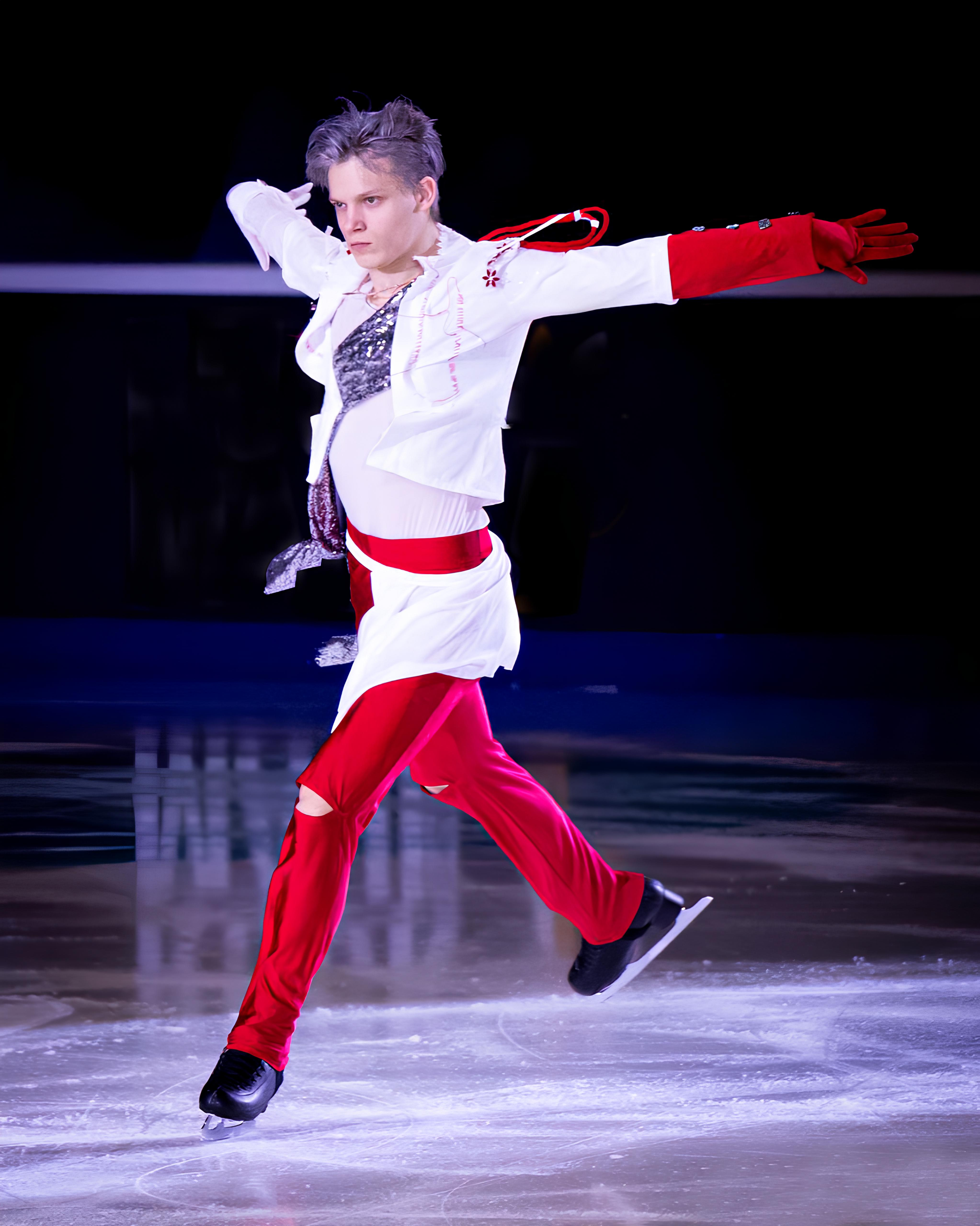
Evgeni Semenenko

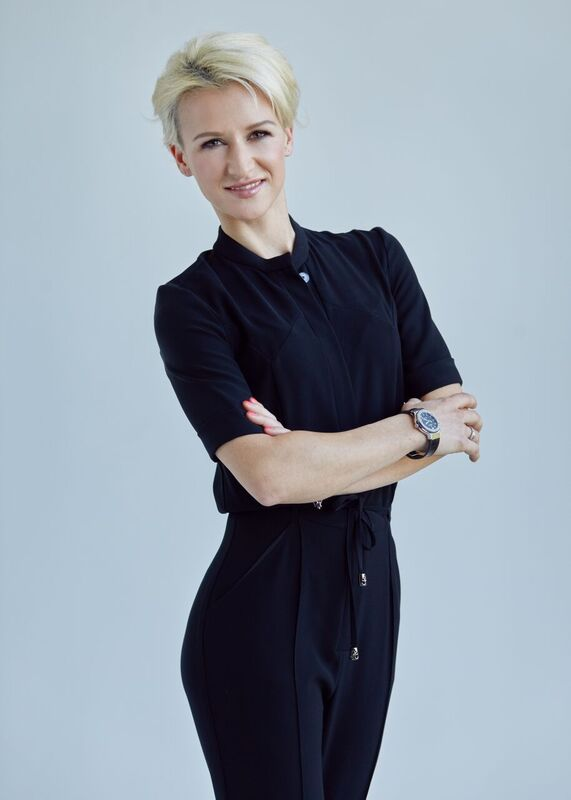
Tatiana Volosozhar

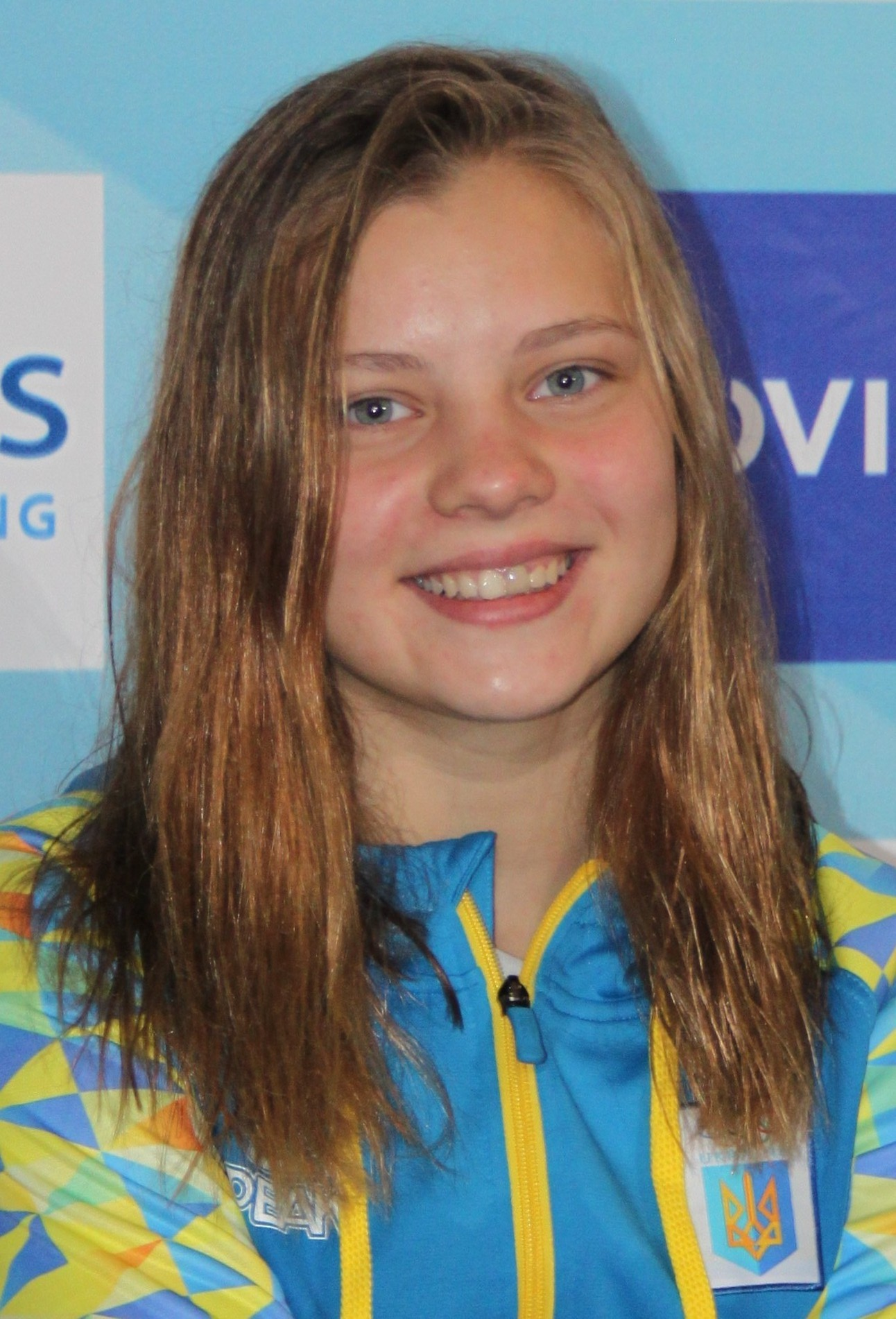
Sofiya Lyskun

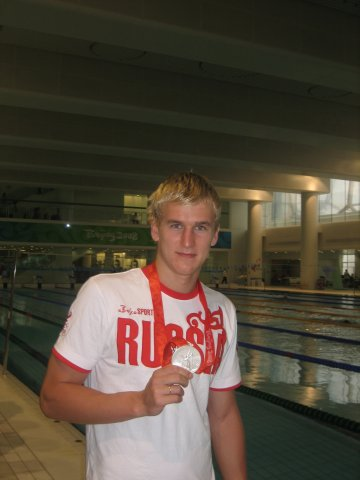
Mikhail Polischuk

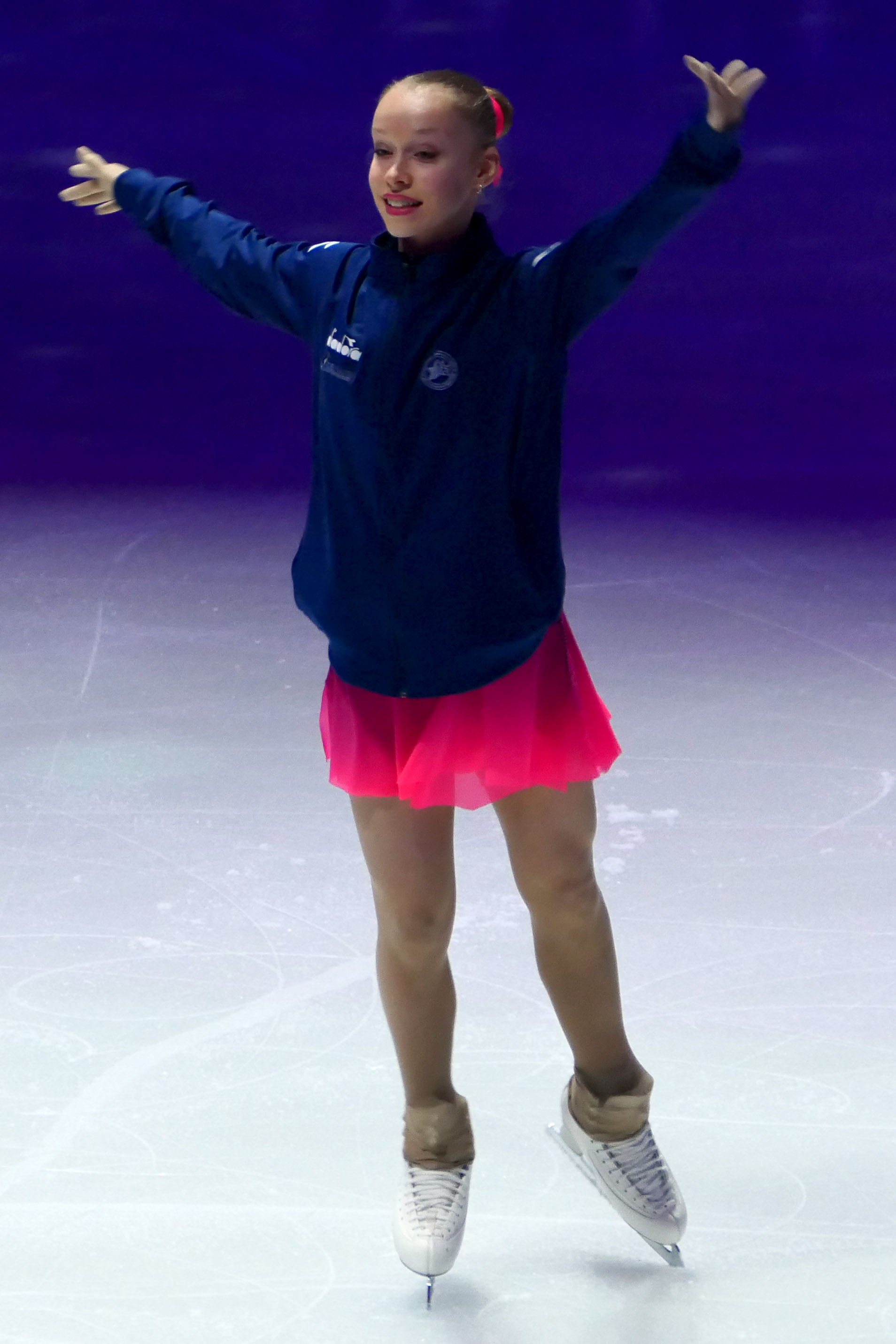
Mariia Seniuk

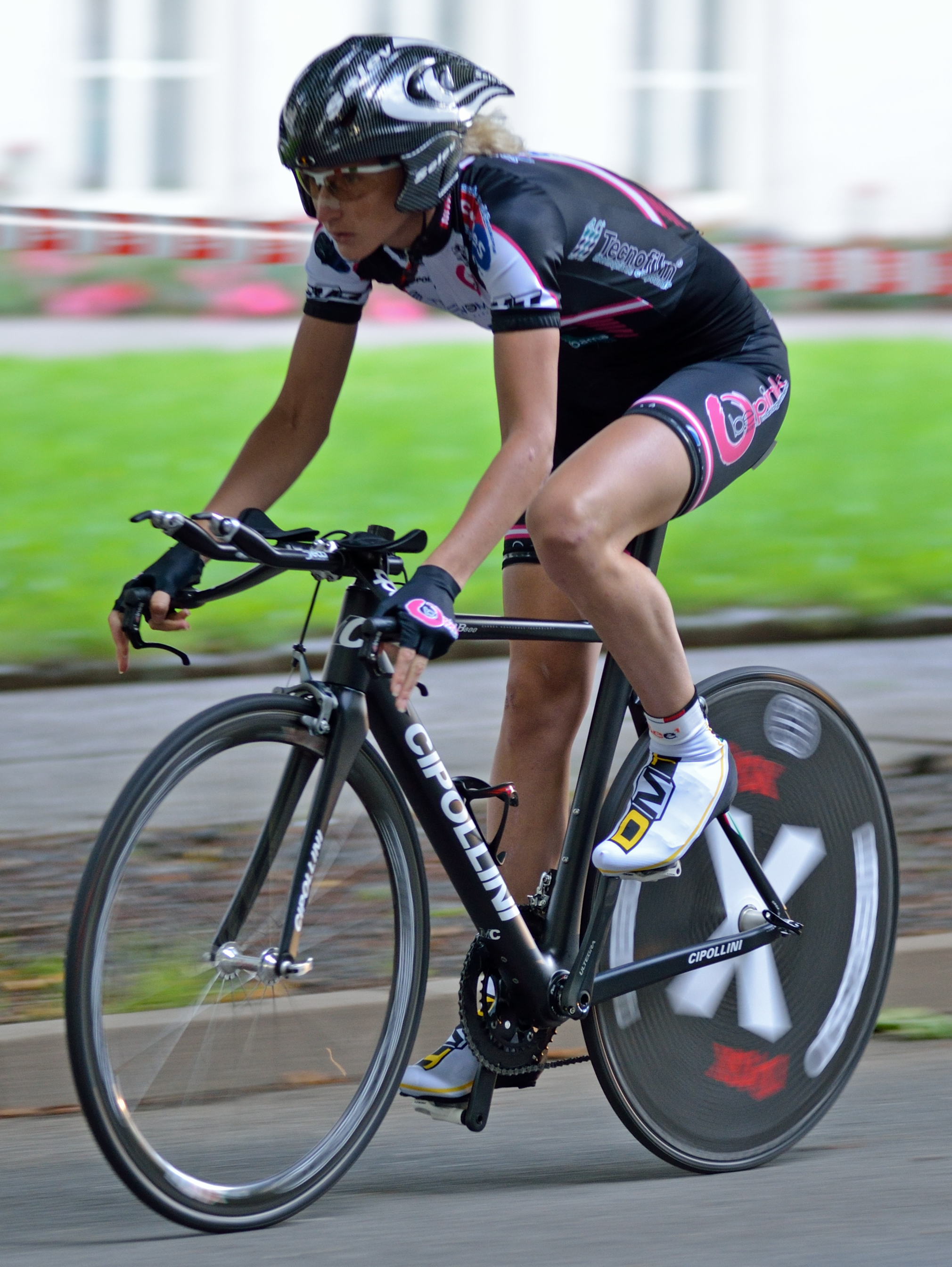
Oxana Kozonchuk

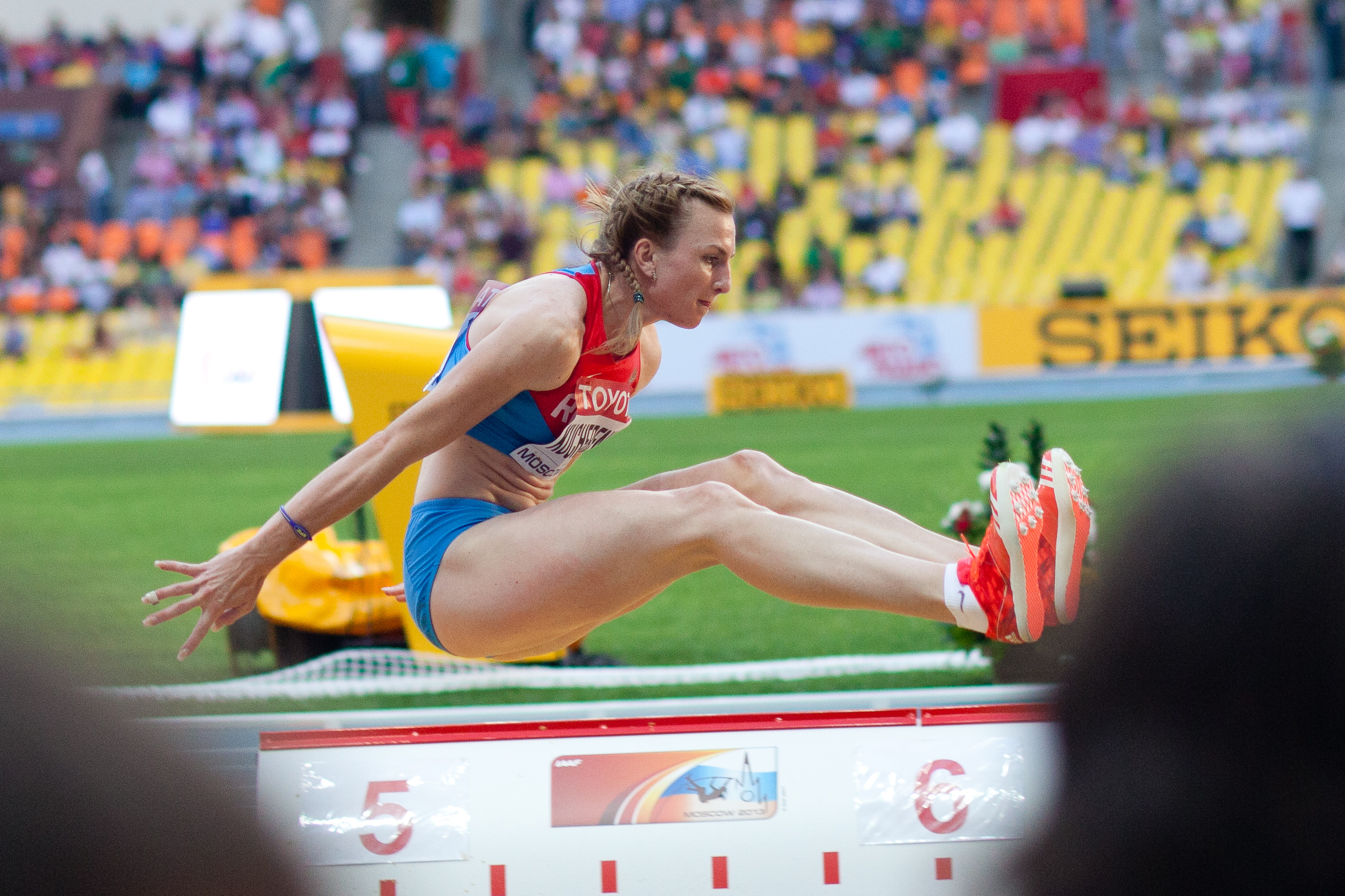
Olga Kucherenko

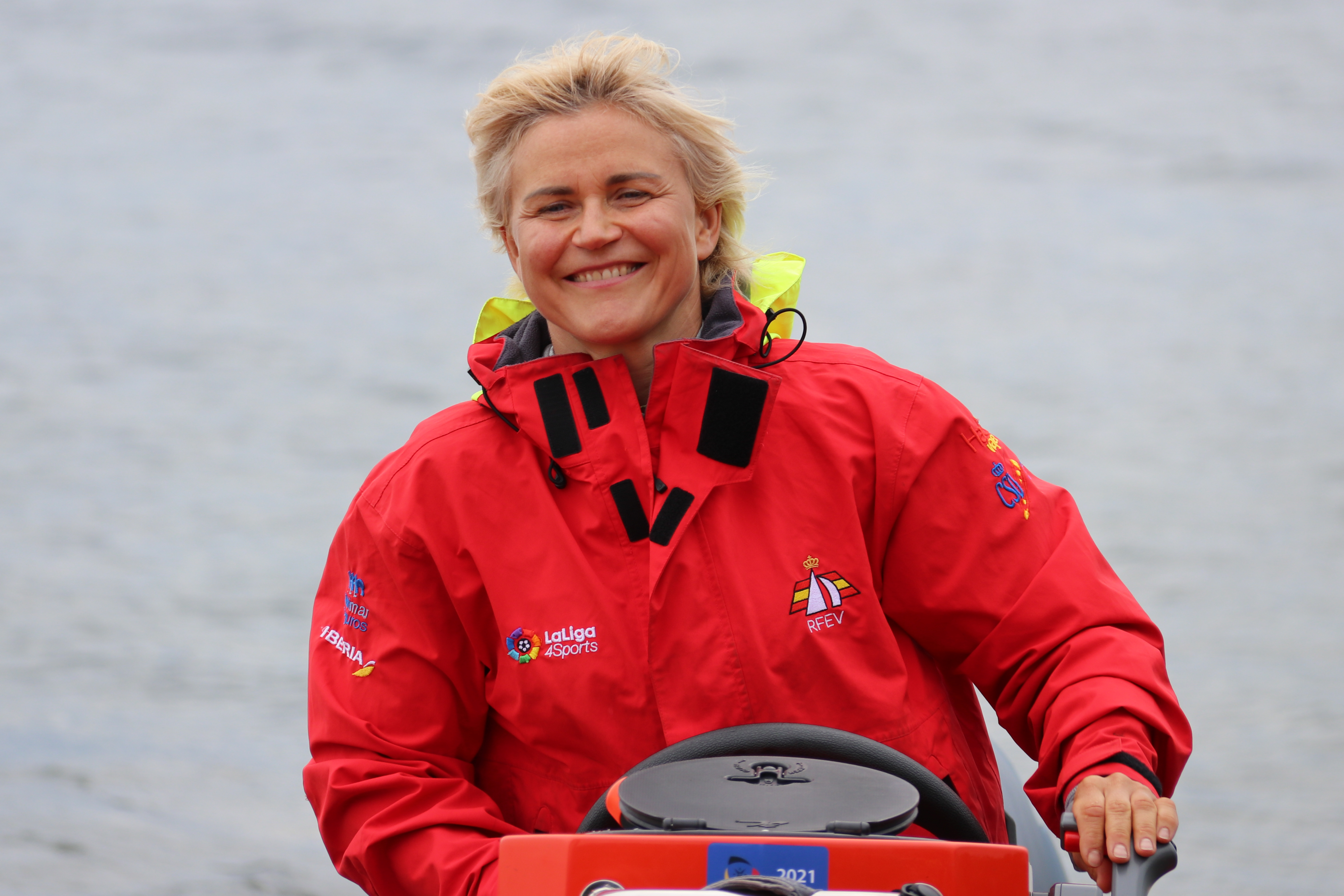
Olha Maslivets

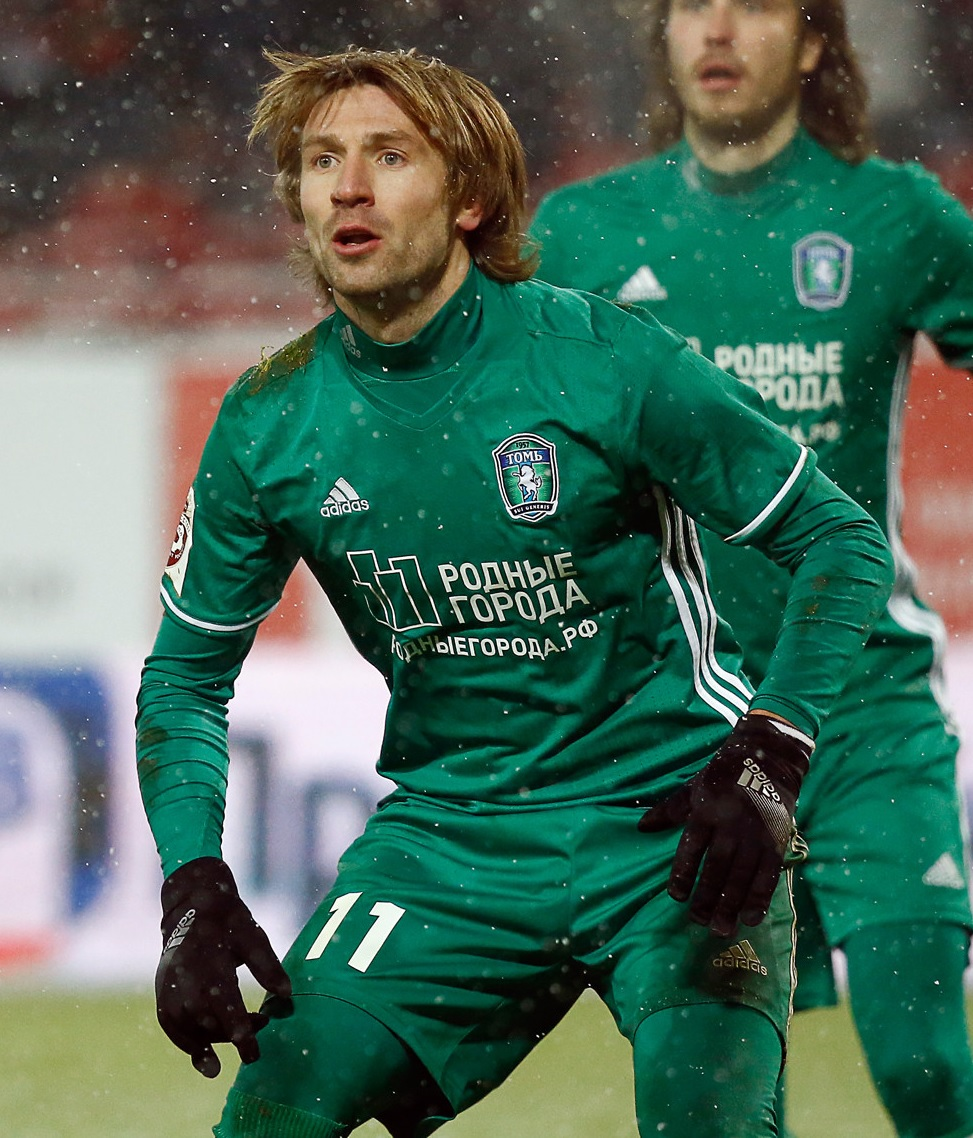
Oleksandr Kasyan

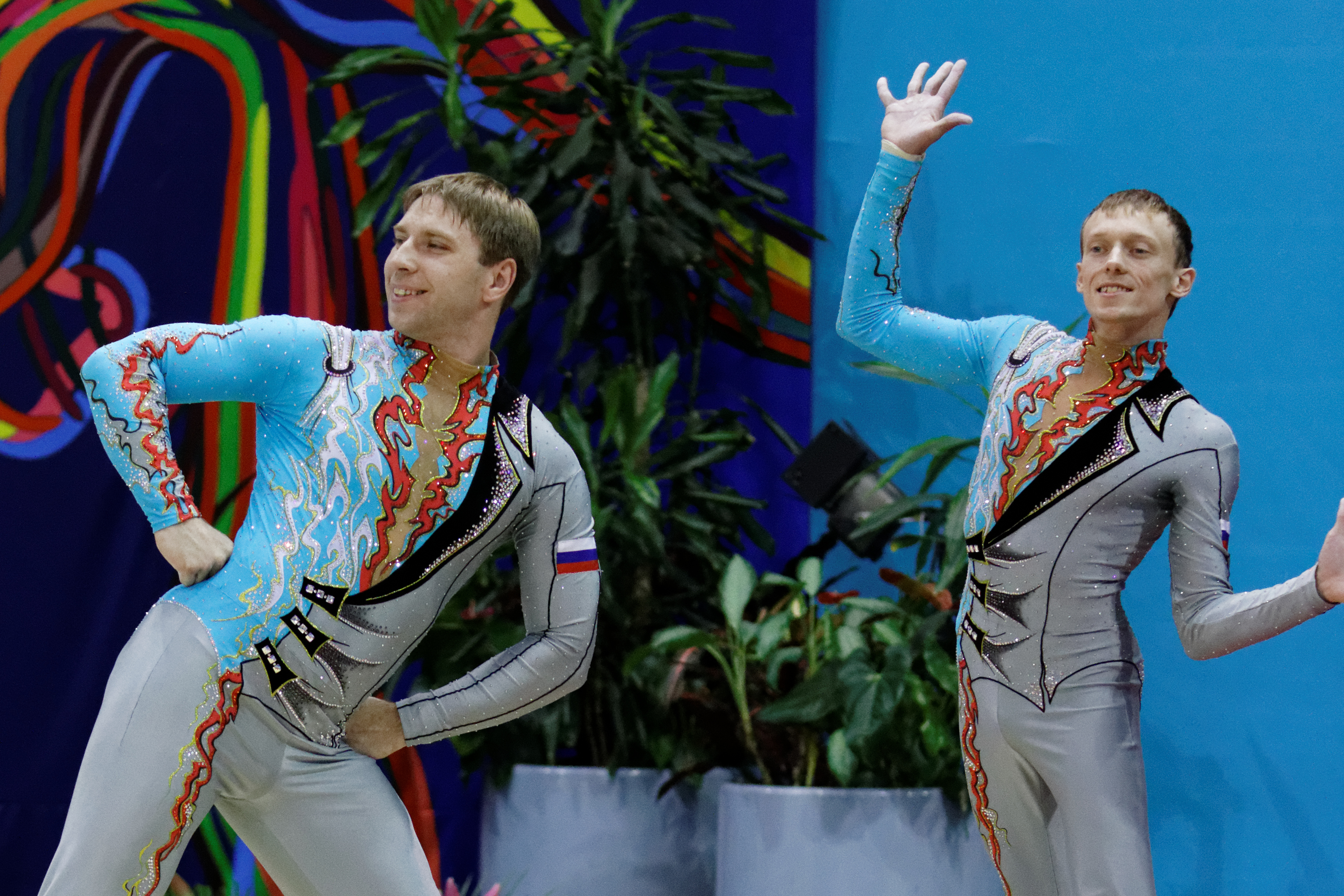
Konstantin Pilipchuk (right) and Alexei Dudchenko at the 2014 Acrobatic Gymnastics World Championships

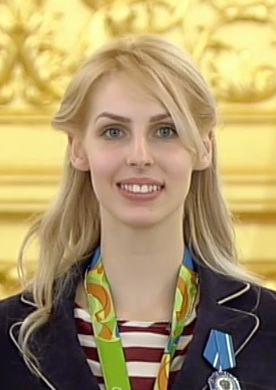
Anastasia Bliznyuk

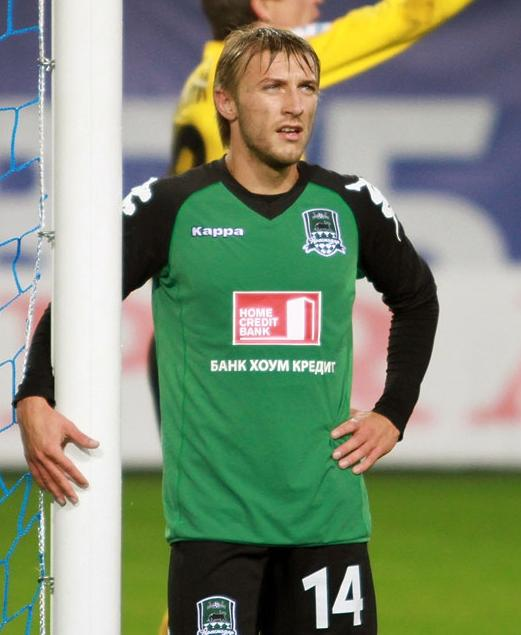
Vladimir Tatarchuk

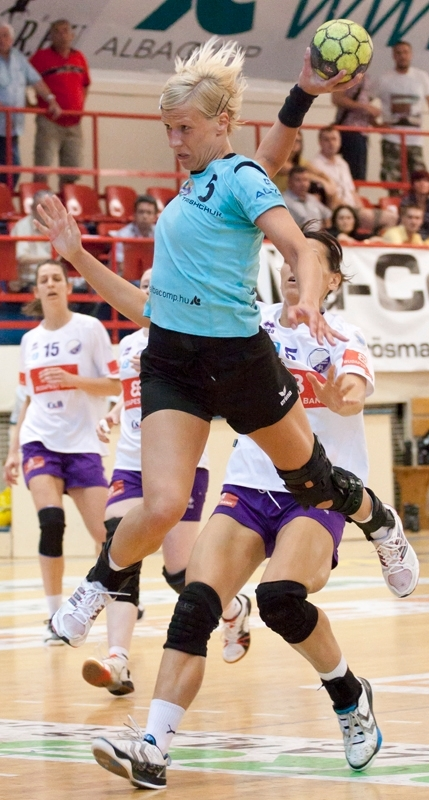
Krisztina Triscsuk

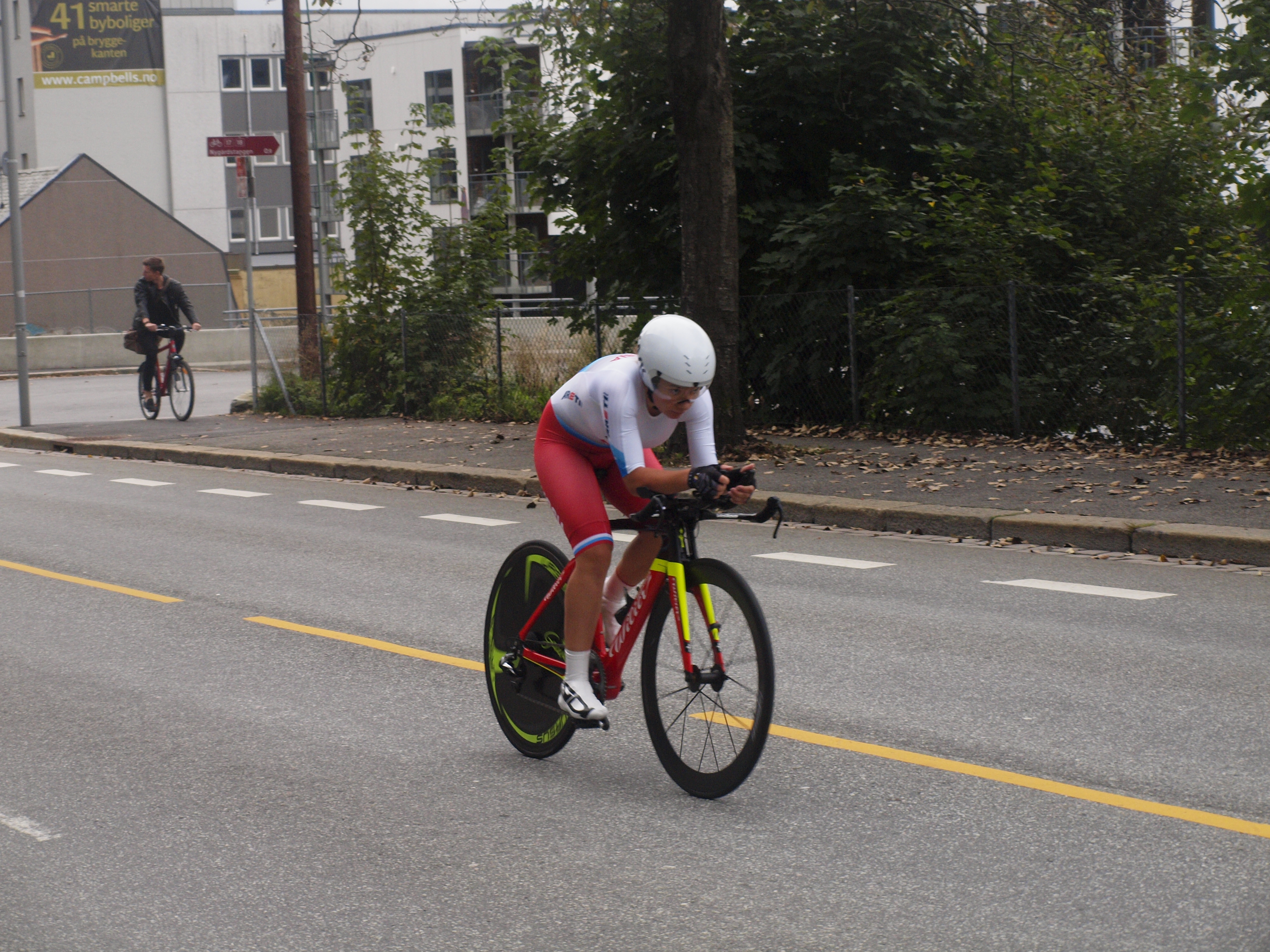
Kseniia Tsymbalyuk

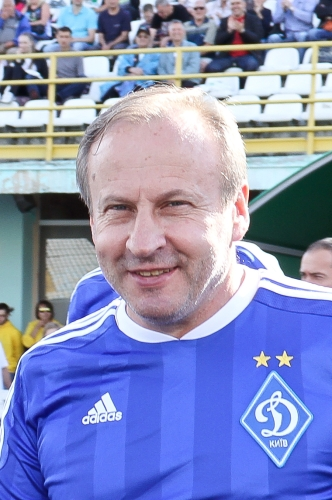
Ivan Yaremchuk

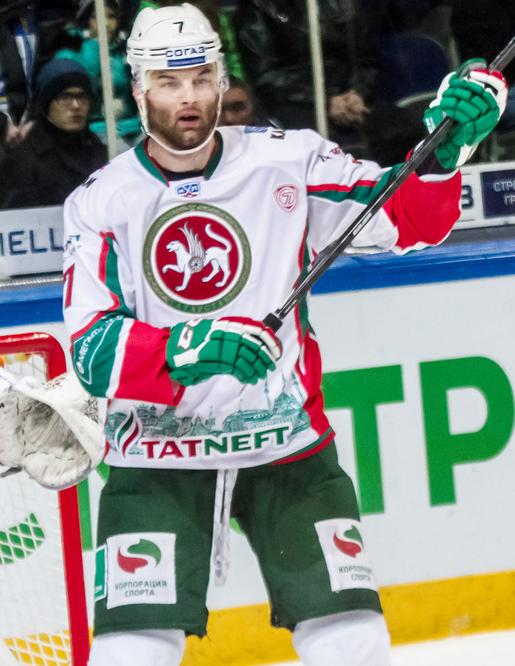
Stepan Zakharchuk

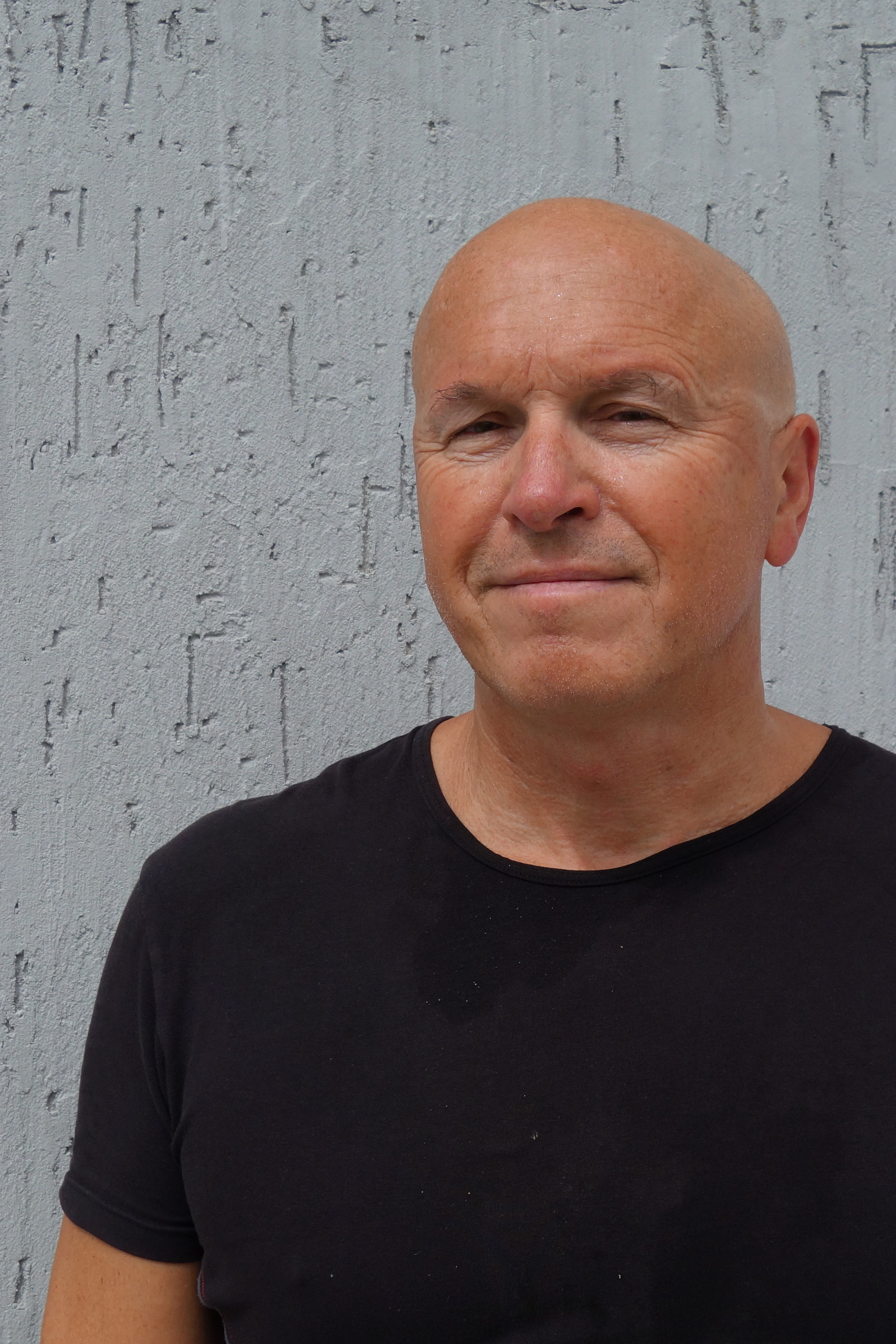
Andrey Fedoriv

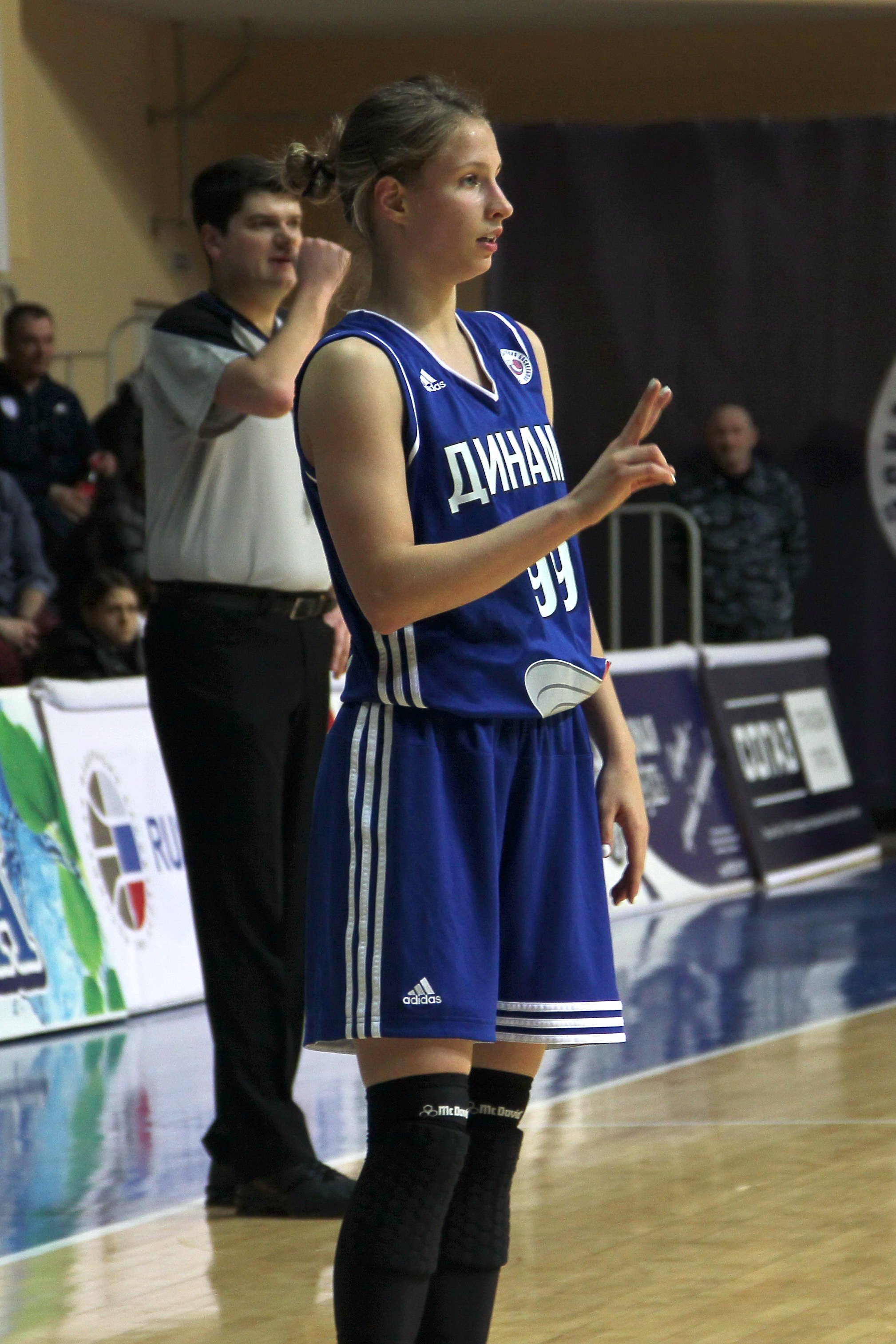
Kseniia Levchenko

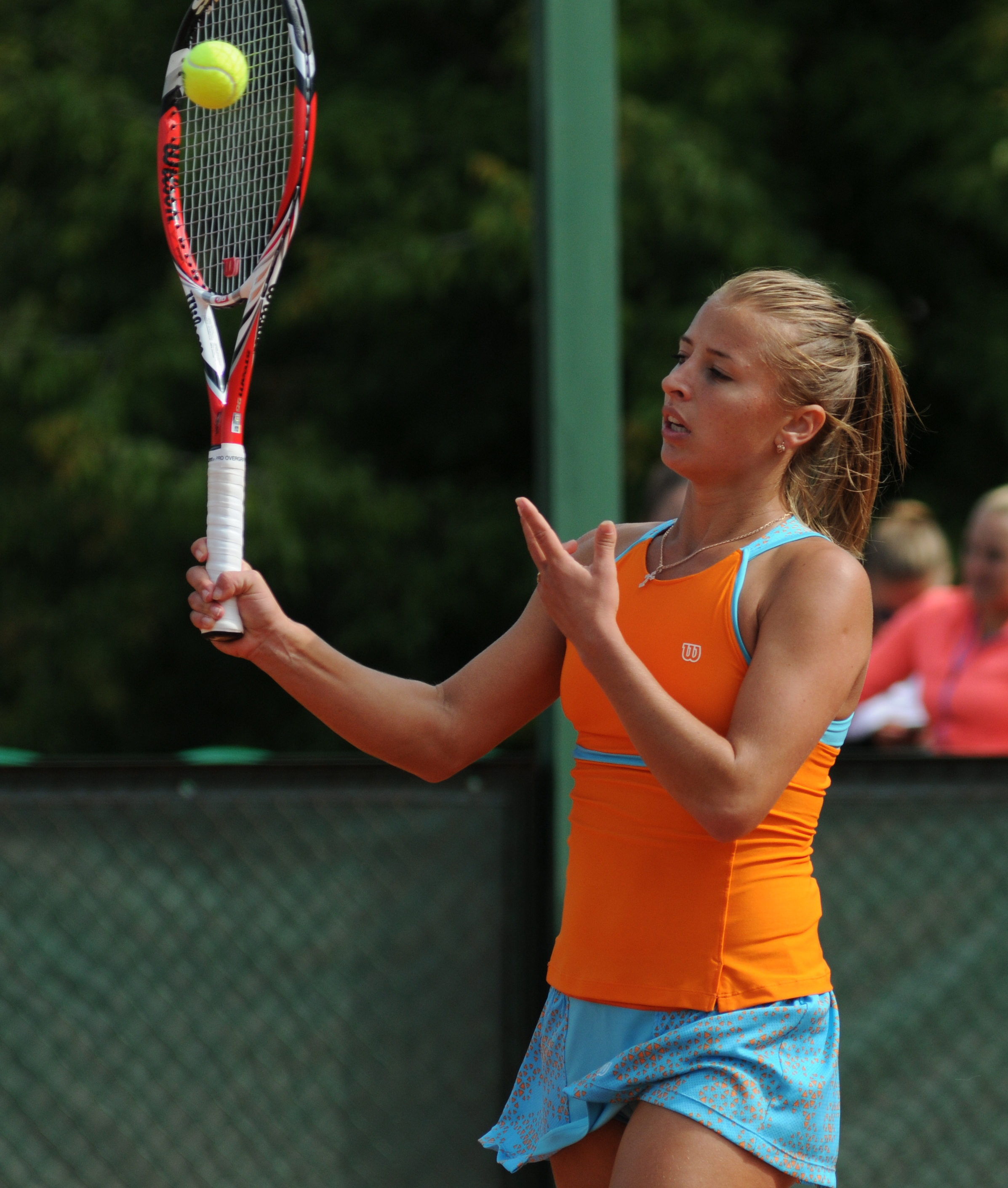
Valentina Ivakhnenko

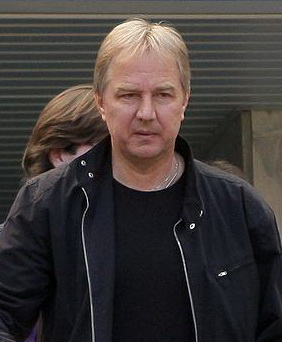
Sergey Shavlo

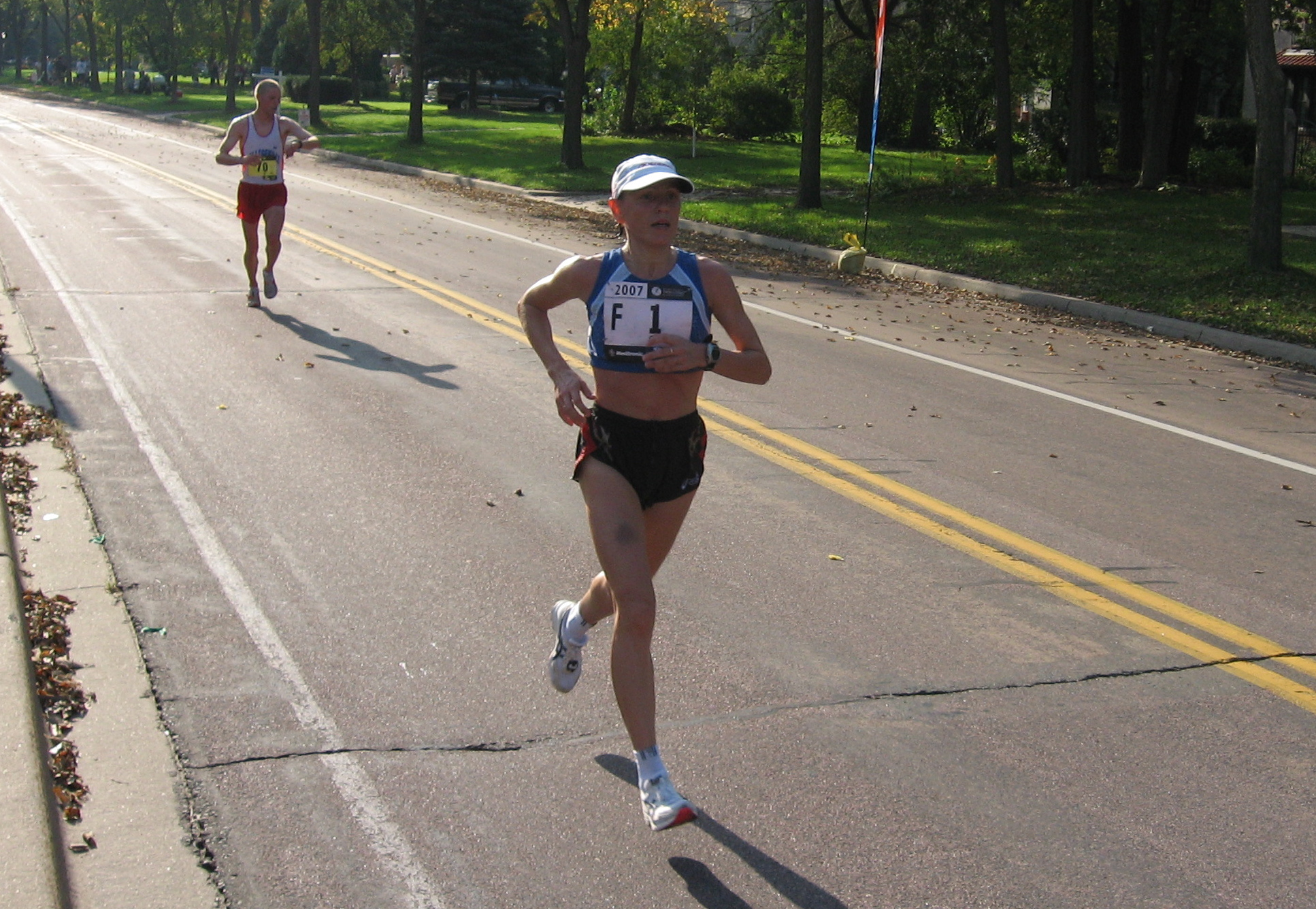
Svetlana Ponomarenko

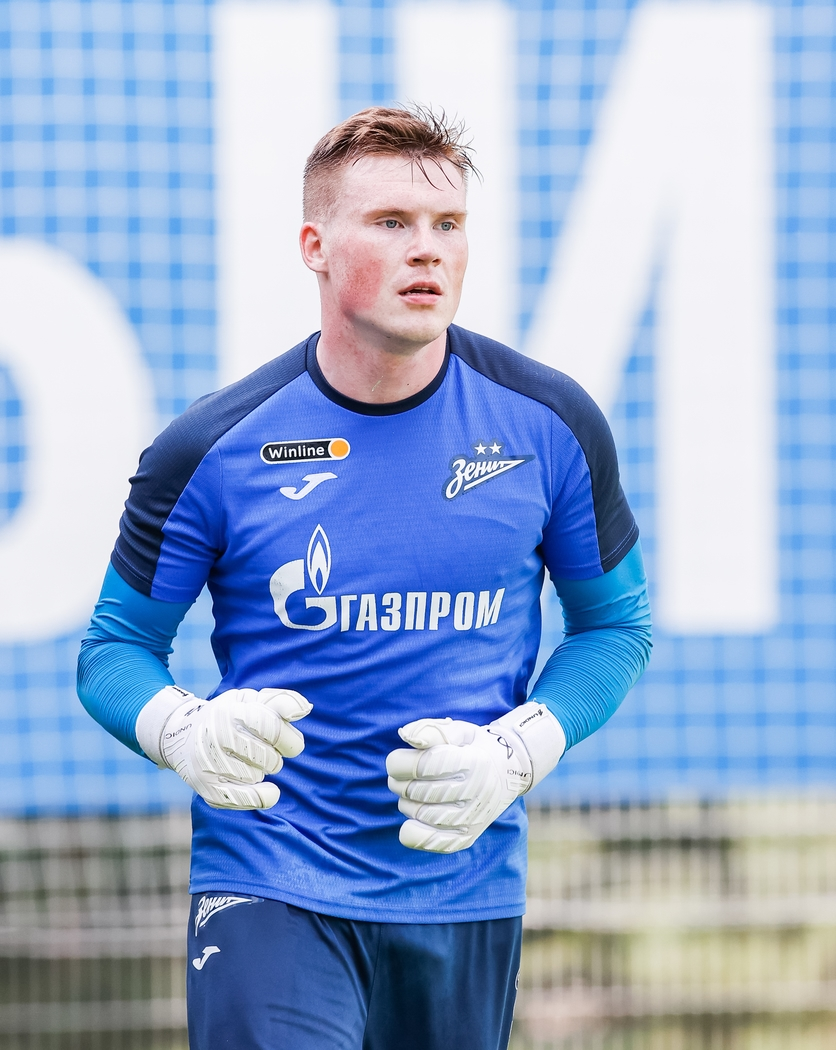
Nikita Goylo

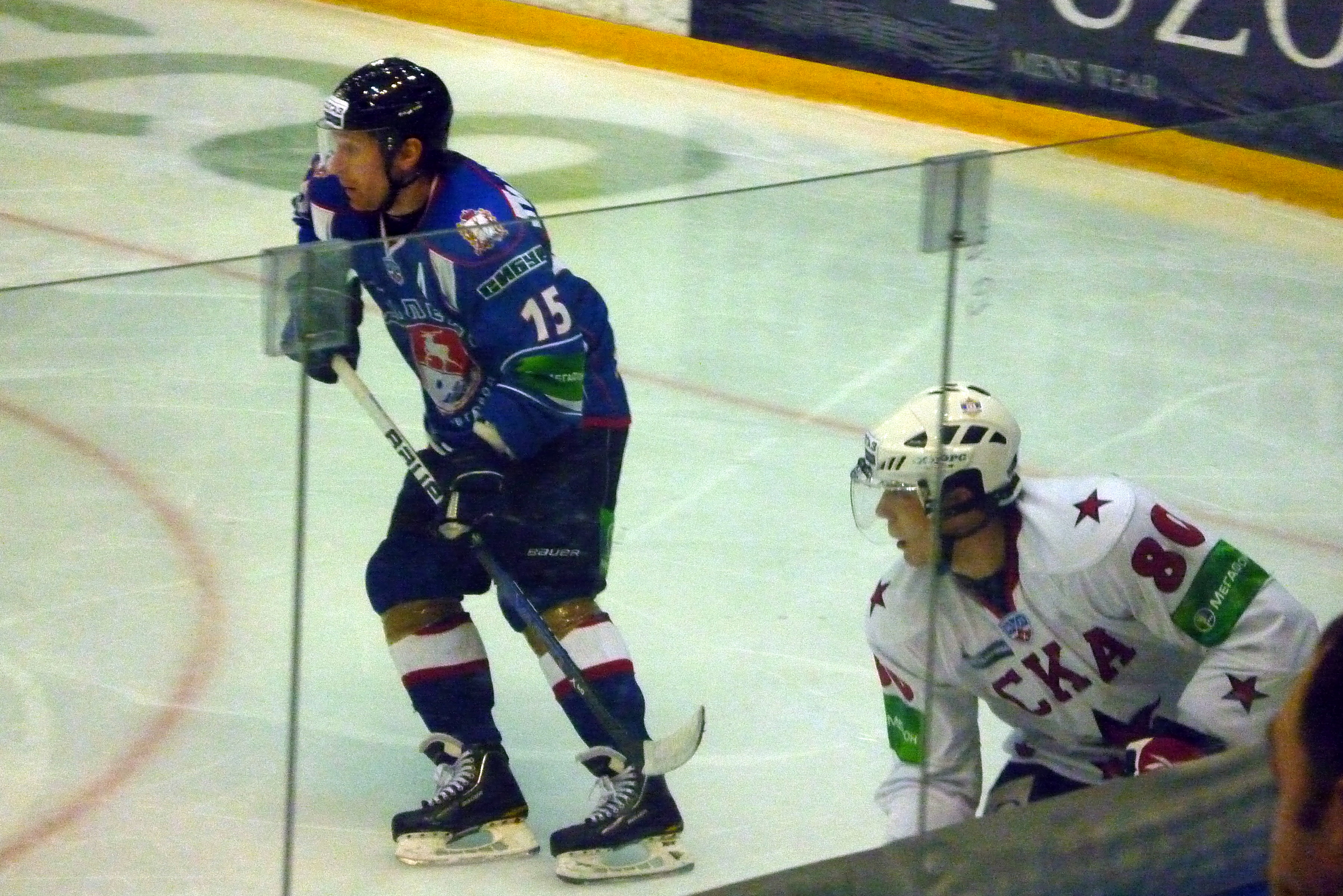
Andrei Nikitenko

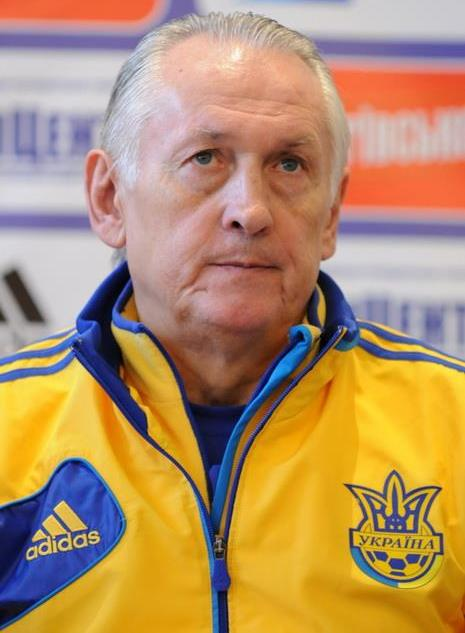
Mykhaylo Fomenko

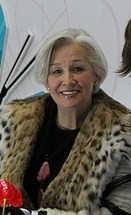
Natalia Linichuk

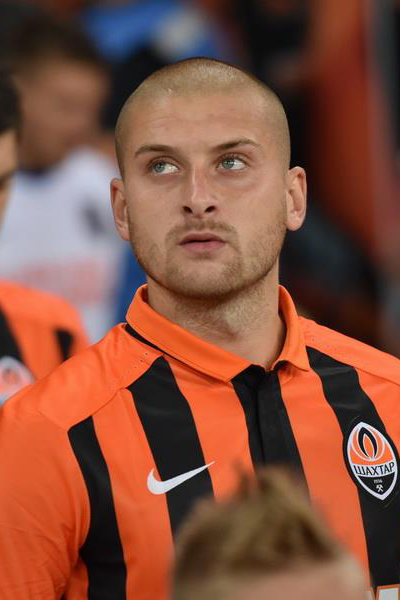
Yaroslav Rakitskyi

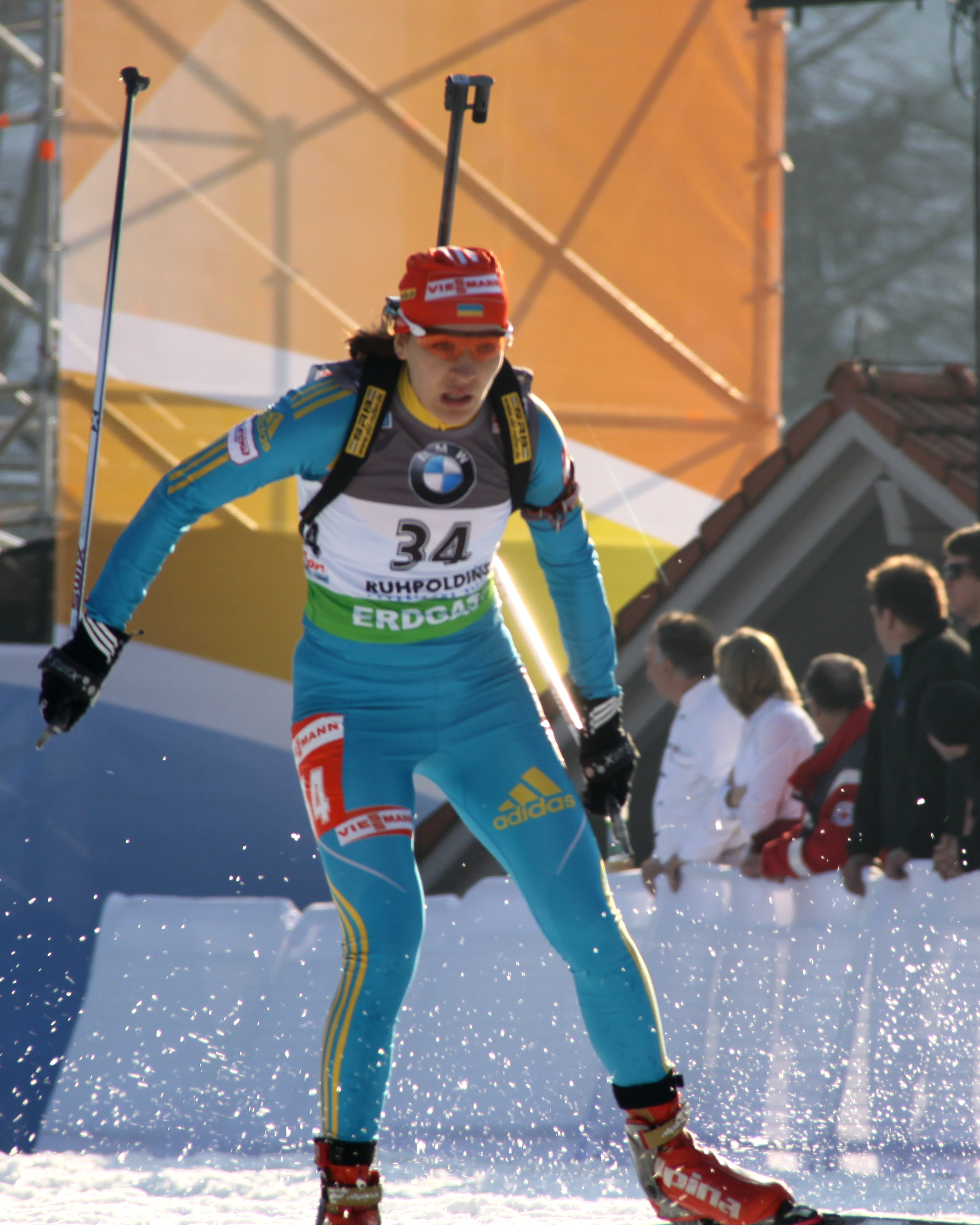
Natalya Otchenash (Burdyga)

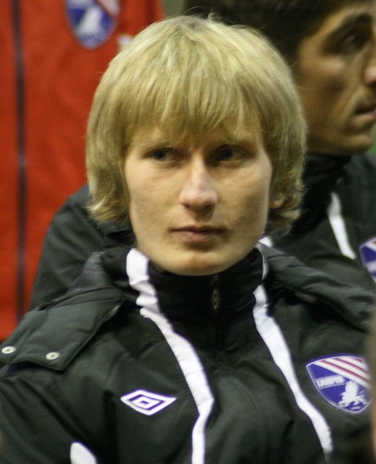
Stanislav Prychynenko

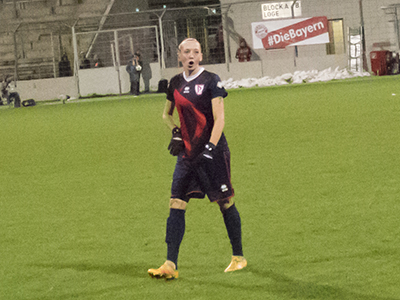
Ekaterina Dmitrenko

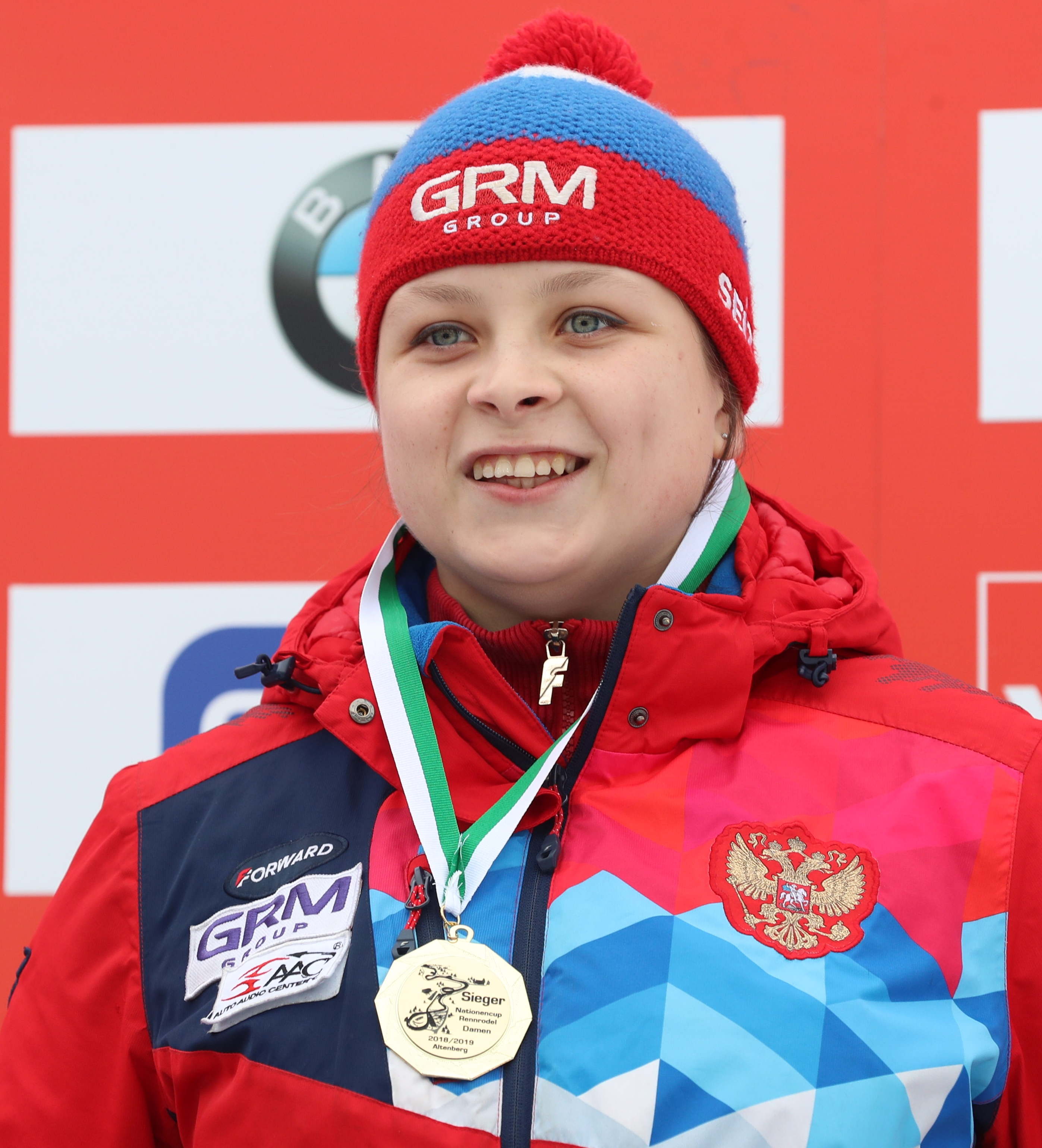
Victoria Demchenko

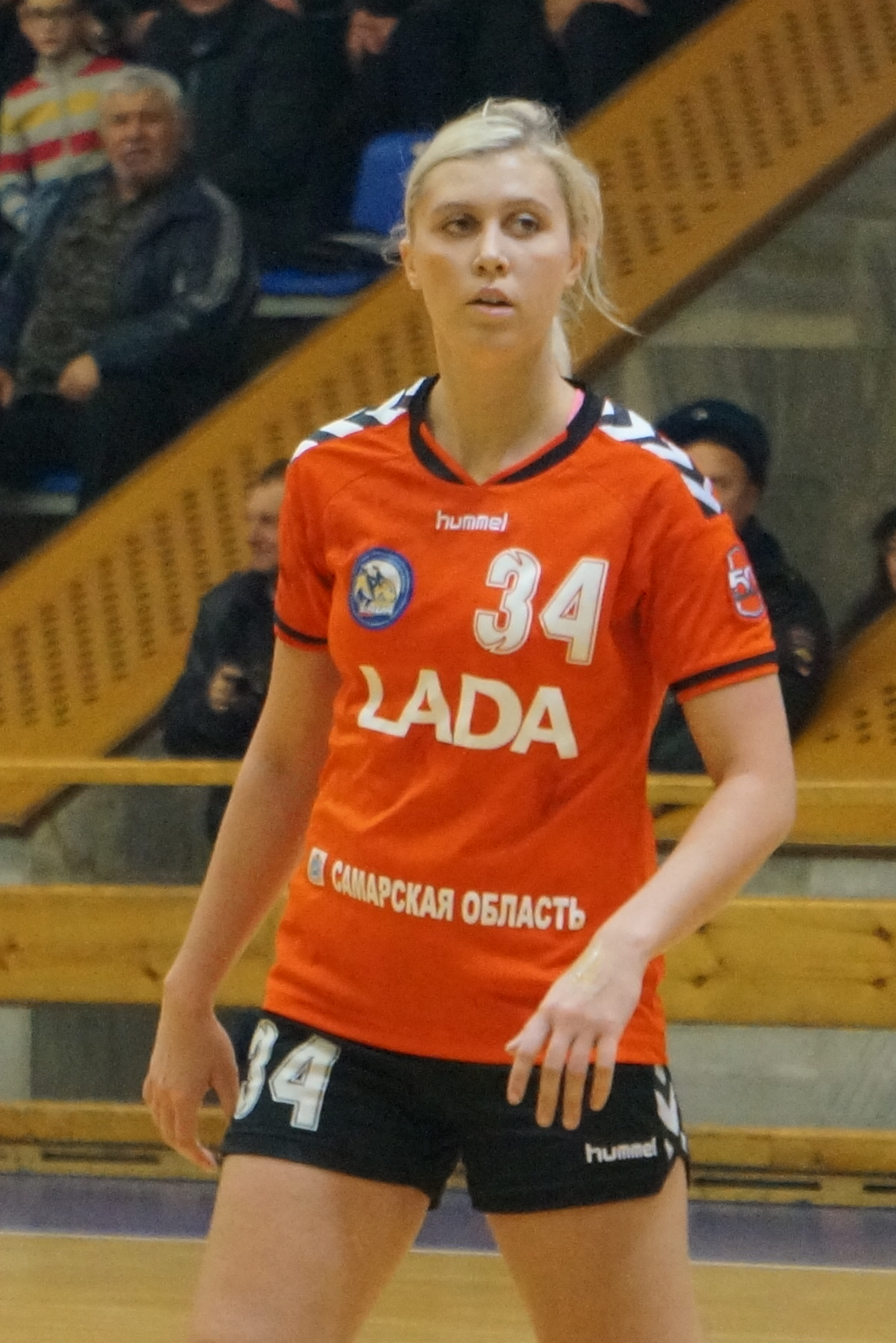
Elizaveta Malashenko

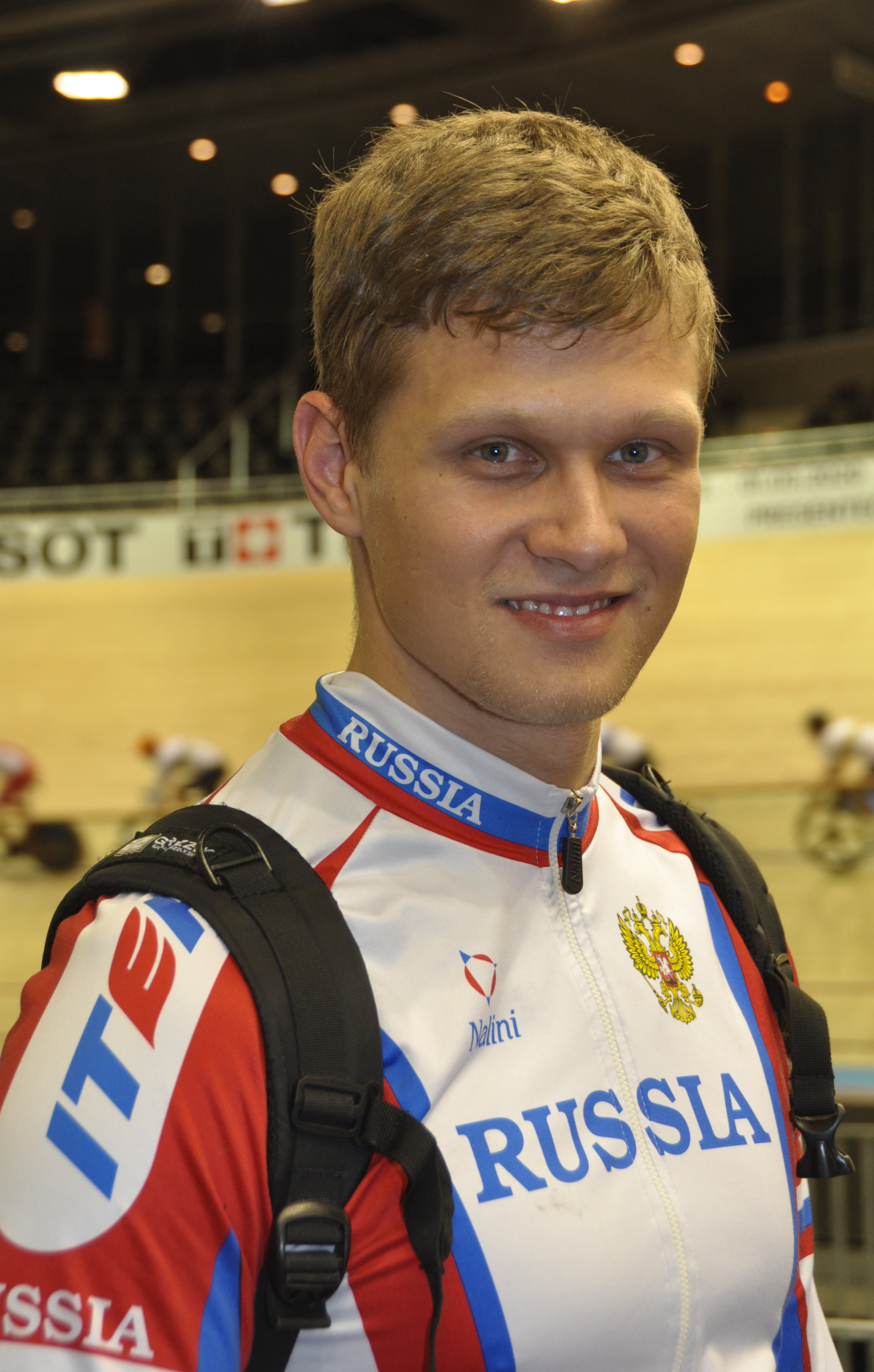
Alexandr Vasyukhno

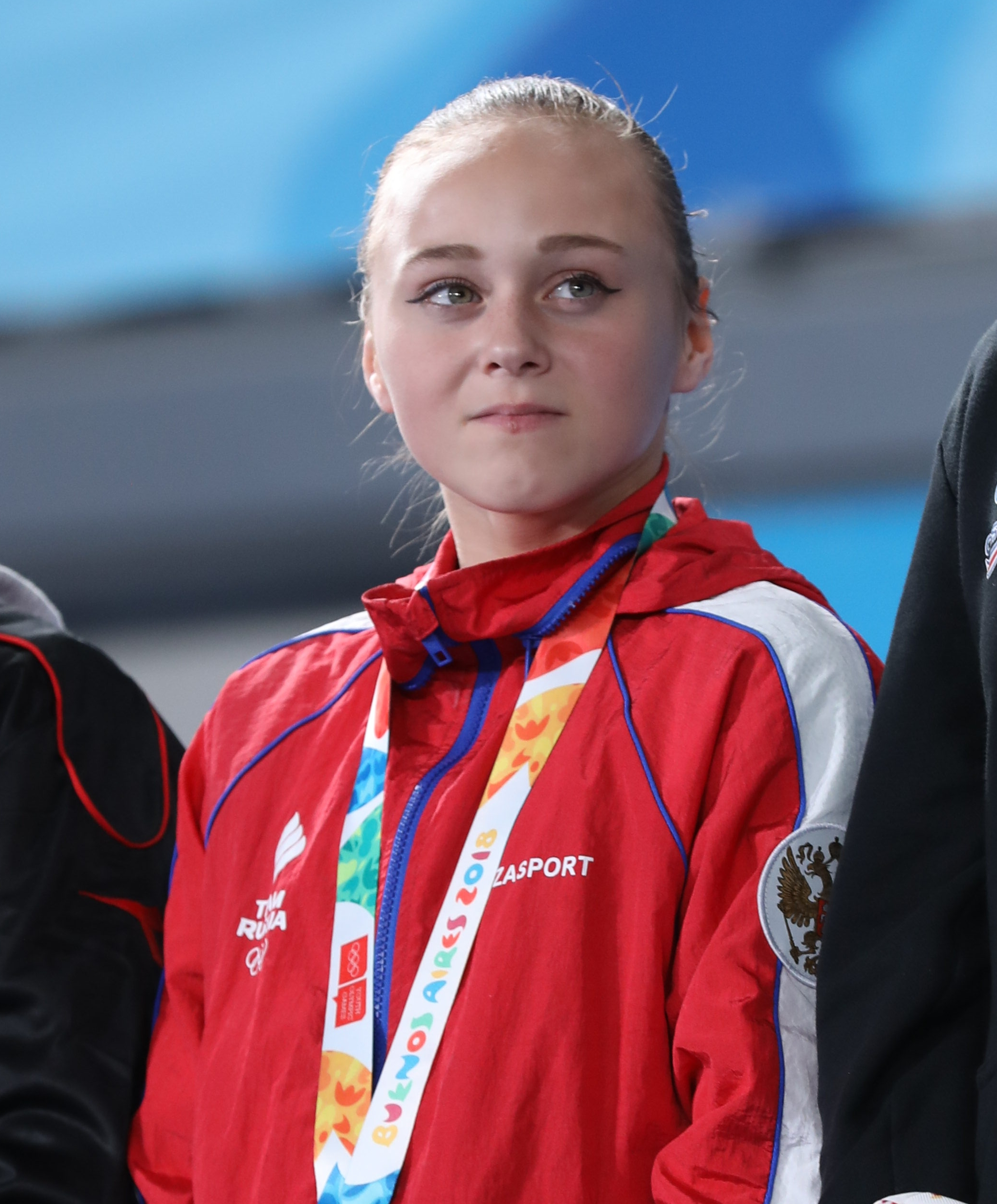
Ksenia Klimenko

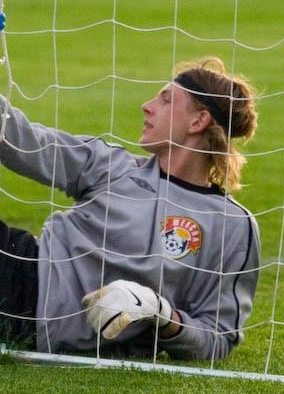
Sergei Prikhodko

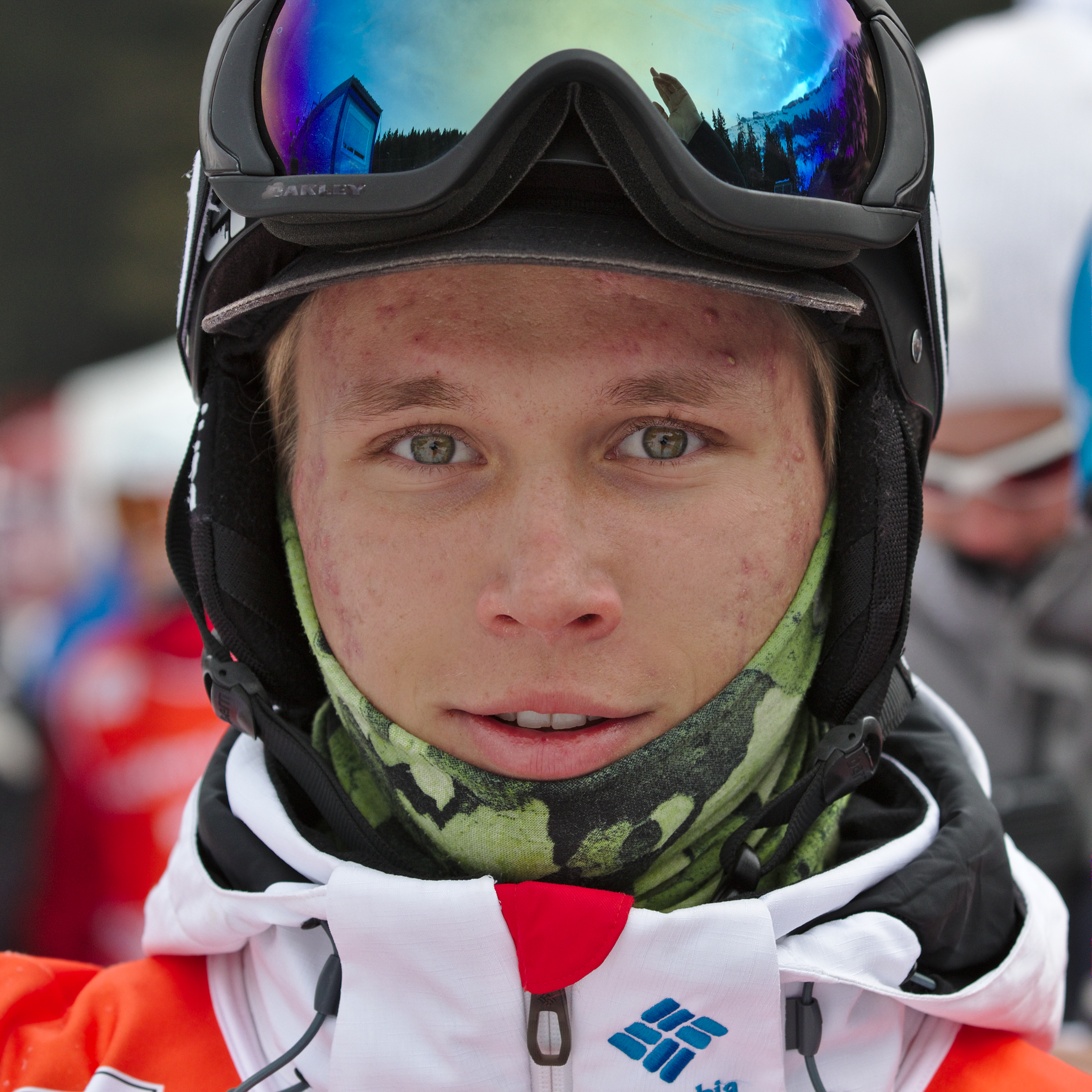
Aleksey Pavlenko

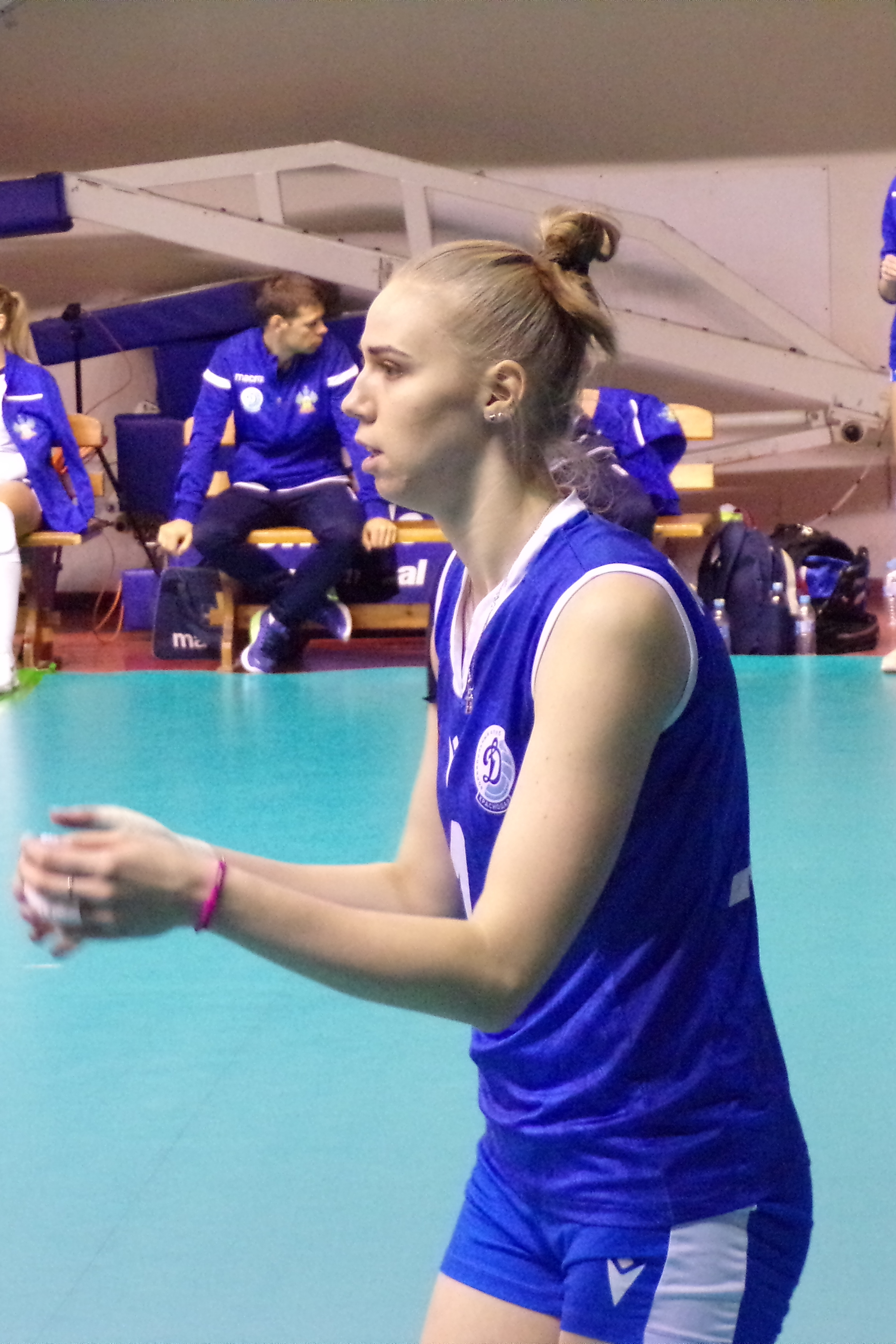
Angelina Lazarenko

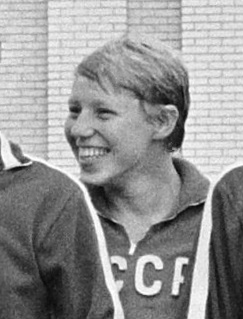
Antonina Rudenko

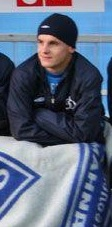
Yevgeni Yatchenko

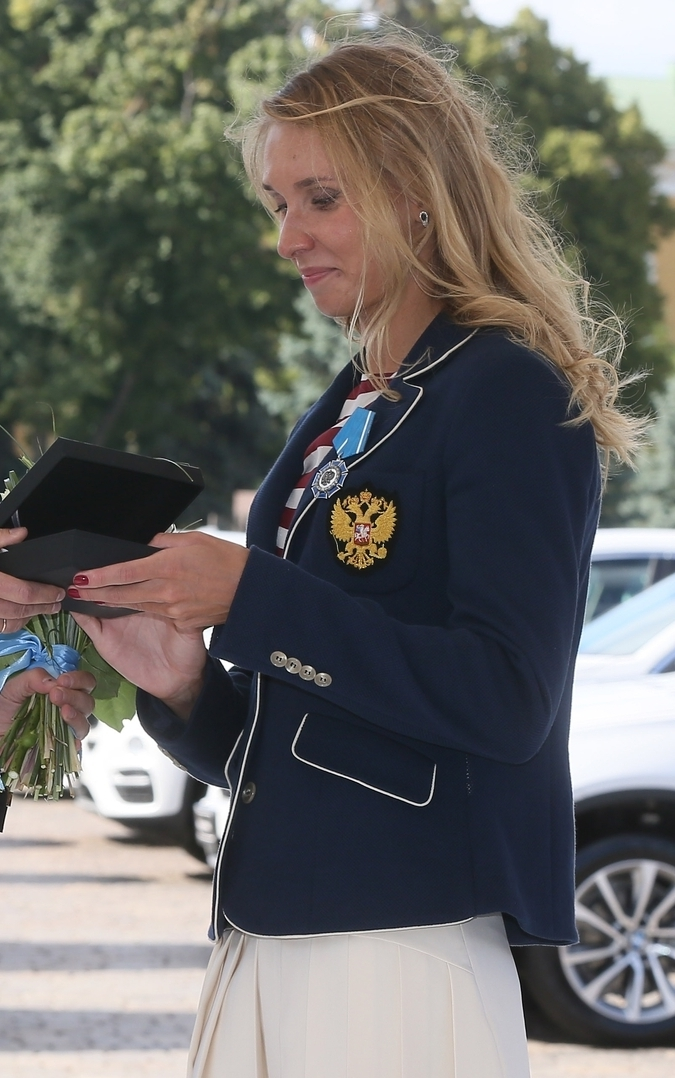
Natalia Ishchenko

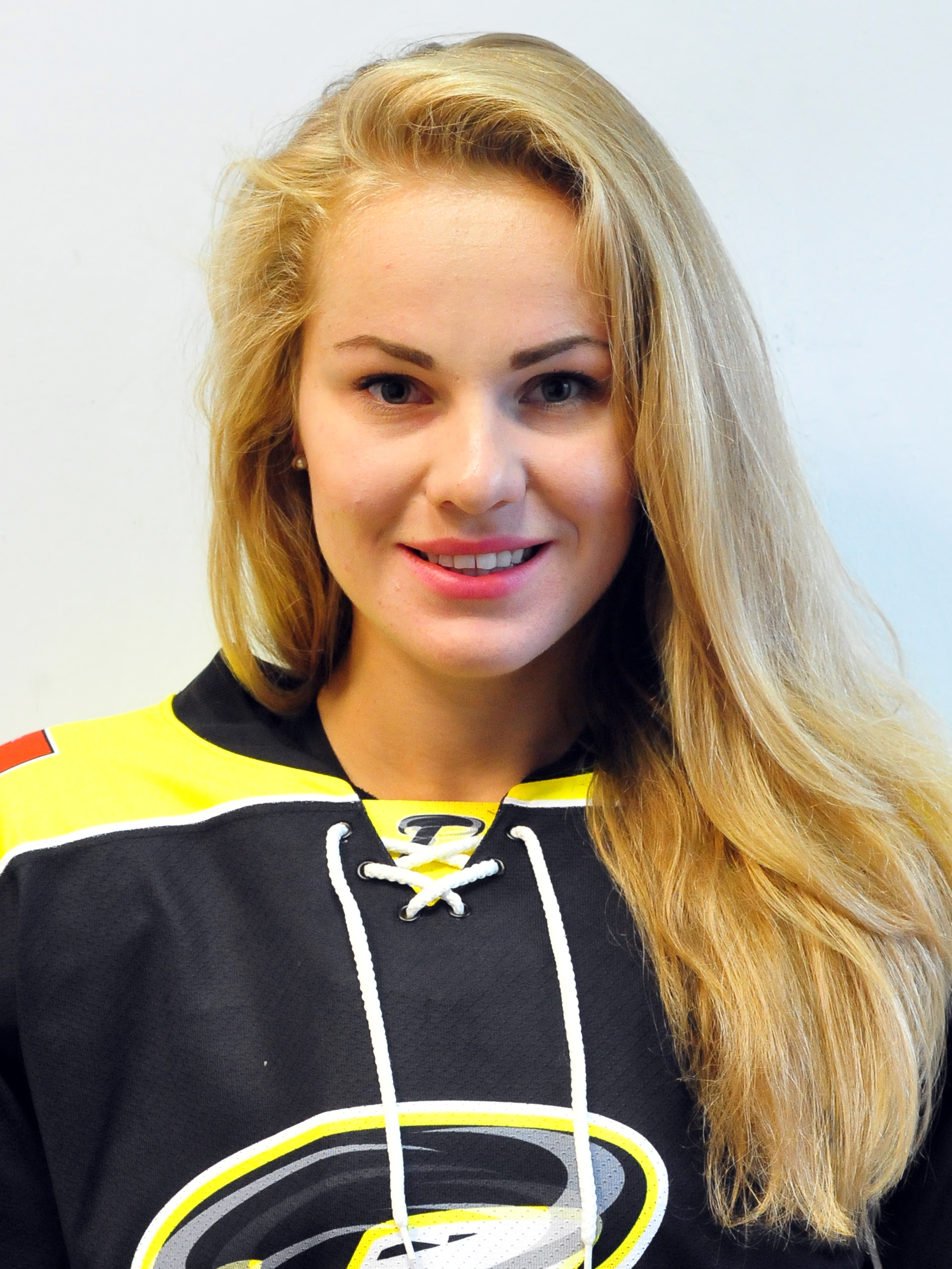
Angelina Goncharenko

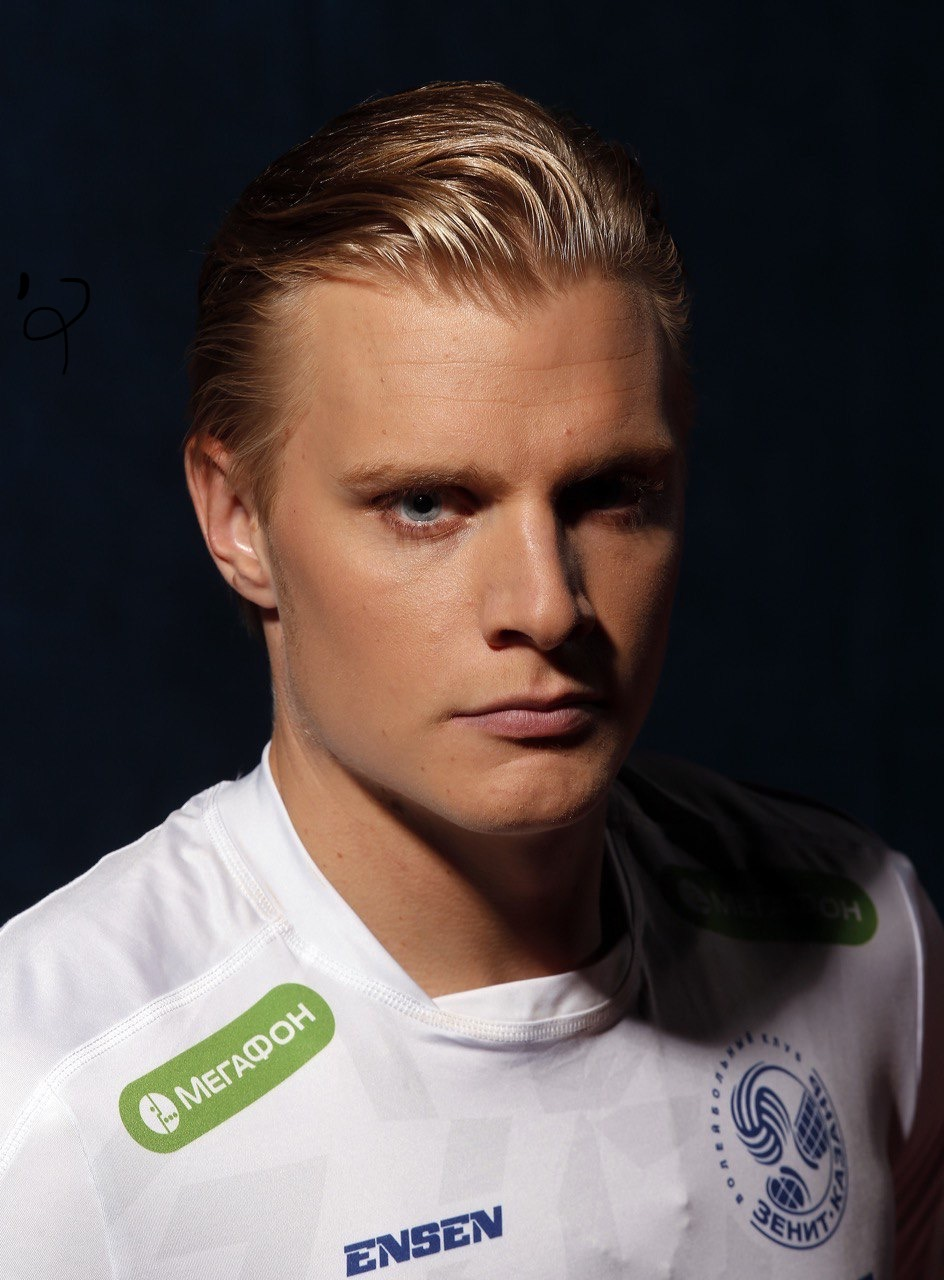
Loran Alekno

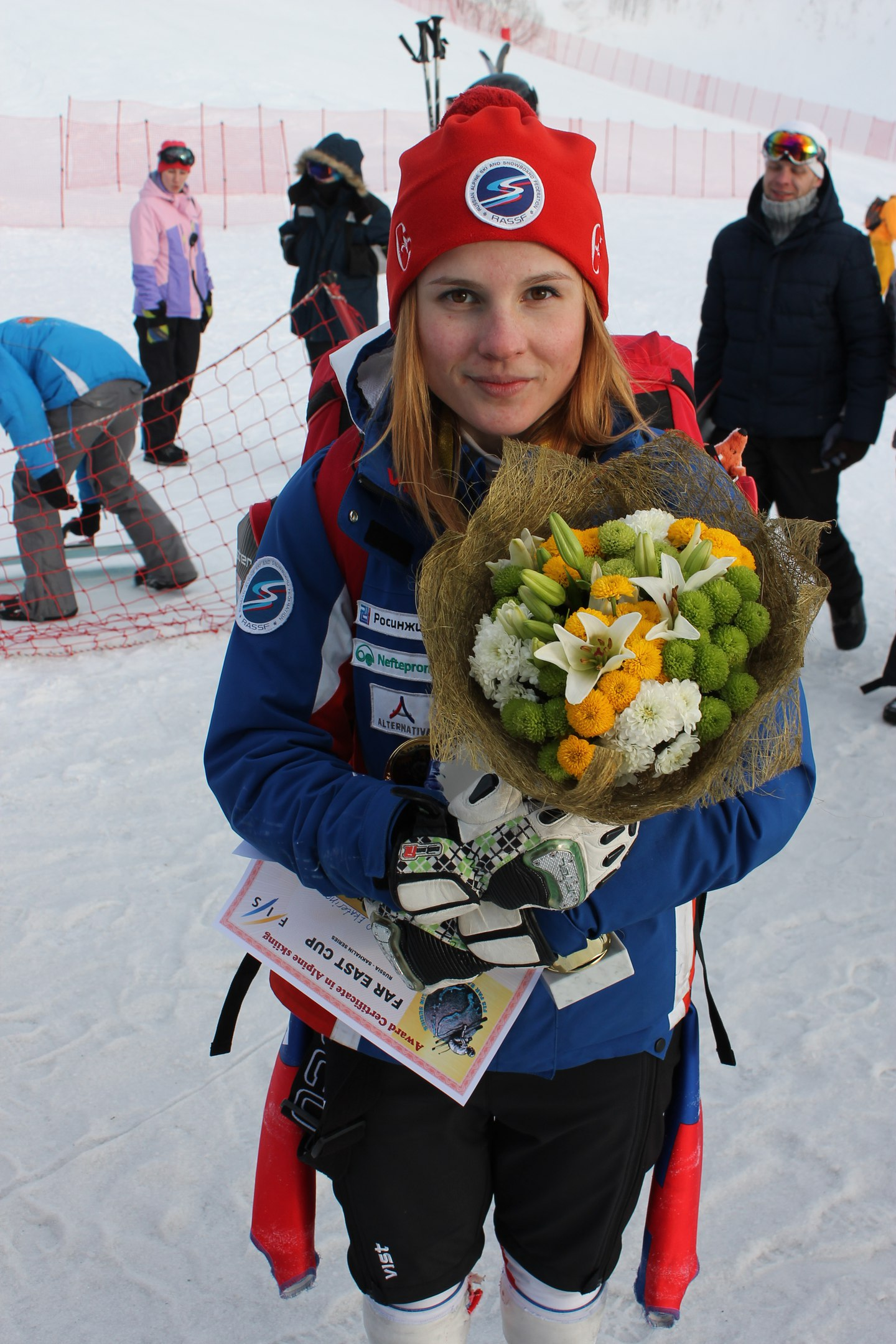
Ekaterina Tkachenko

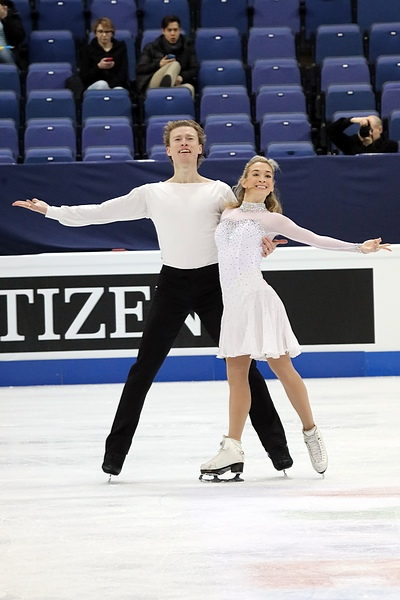
Ilia Tkachenko

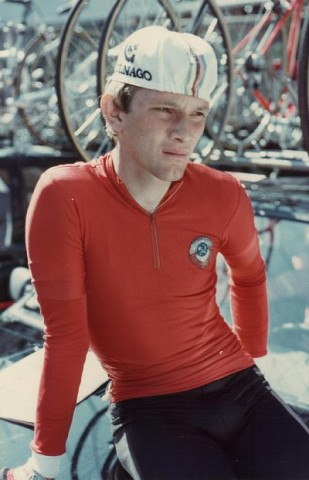
Viktor Demidenko

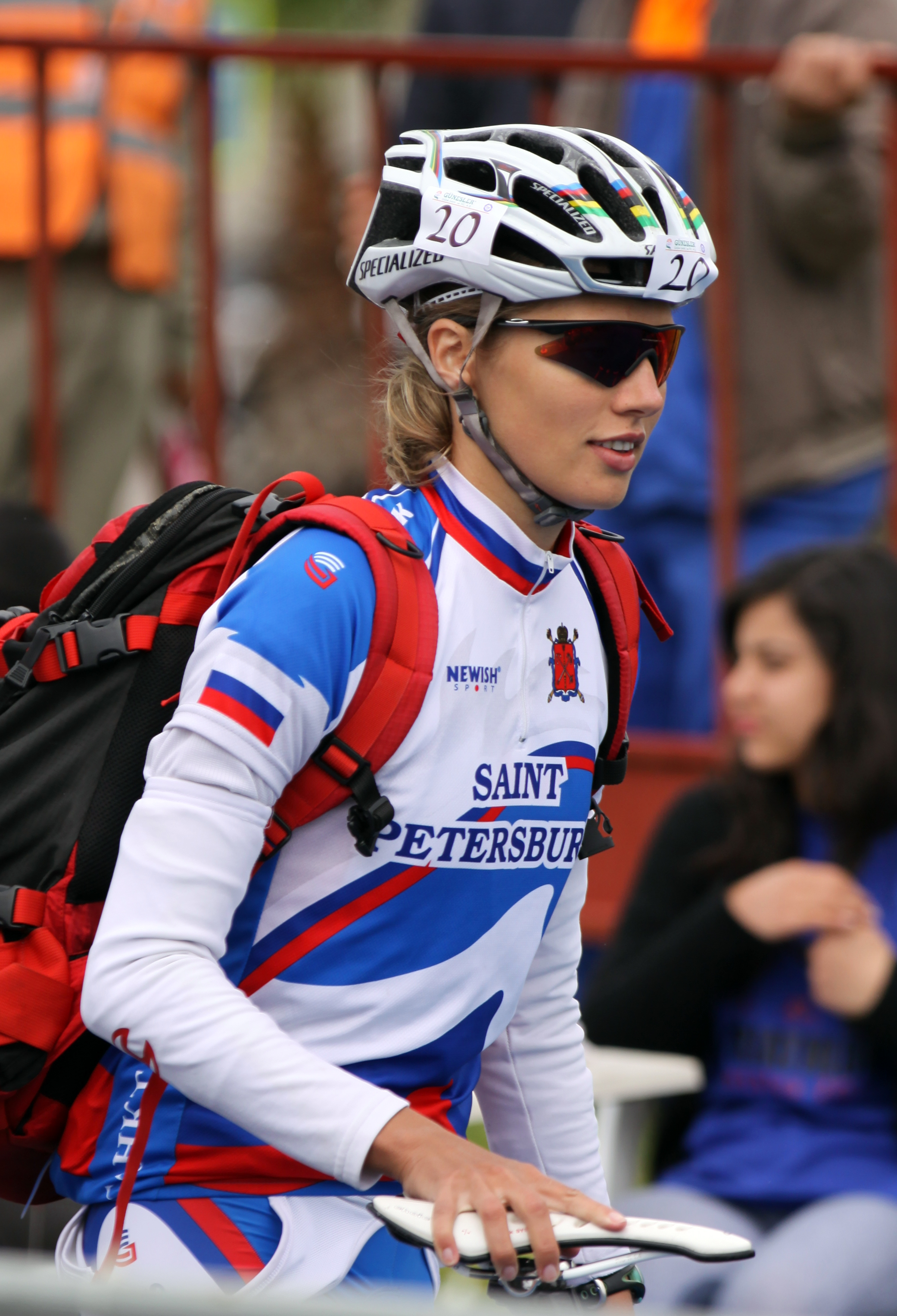
Natalia Shliakhtenko

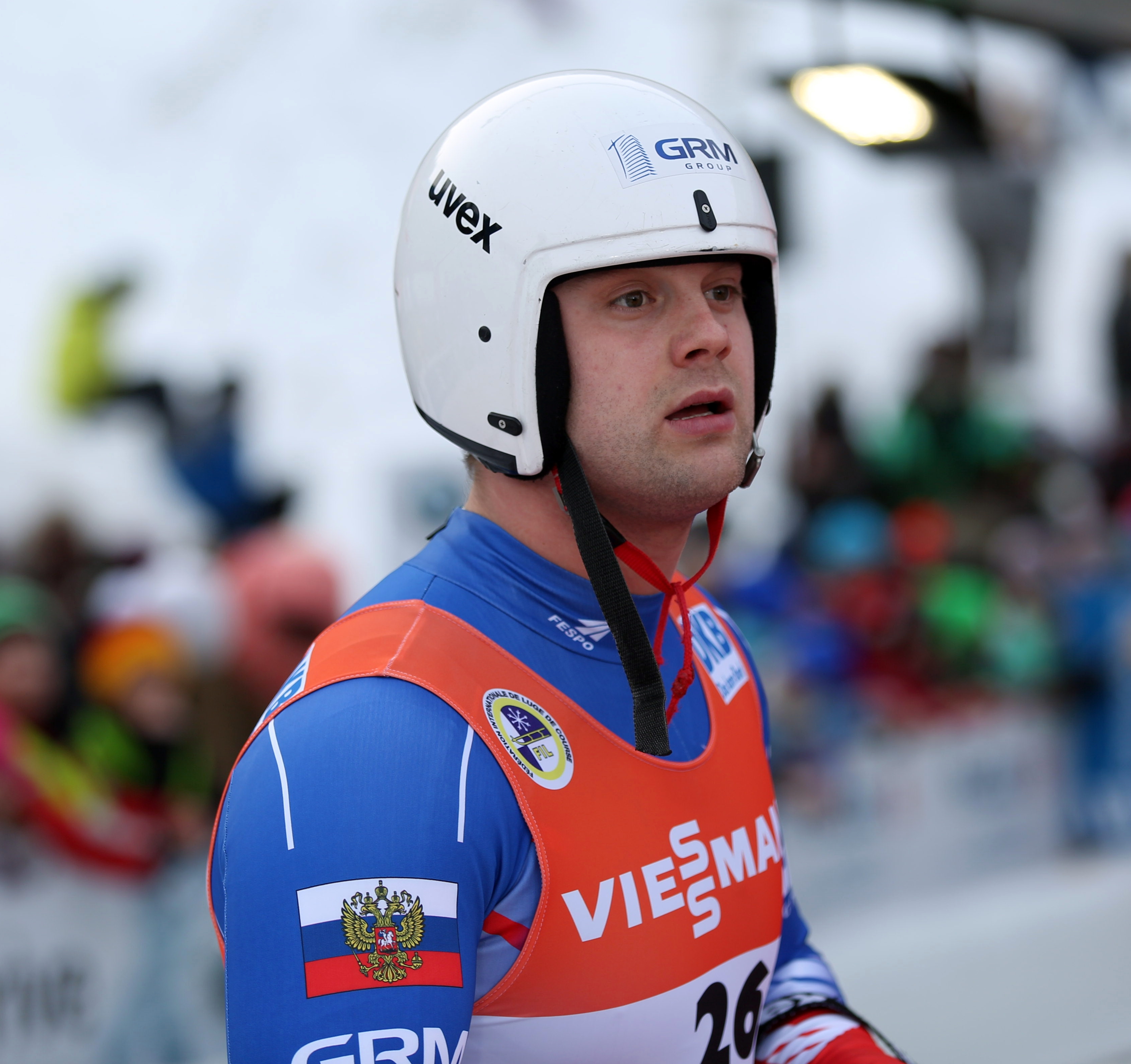
Semen Pavlichenko

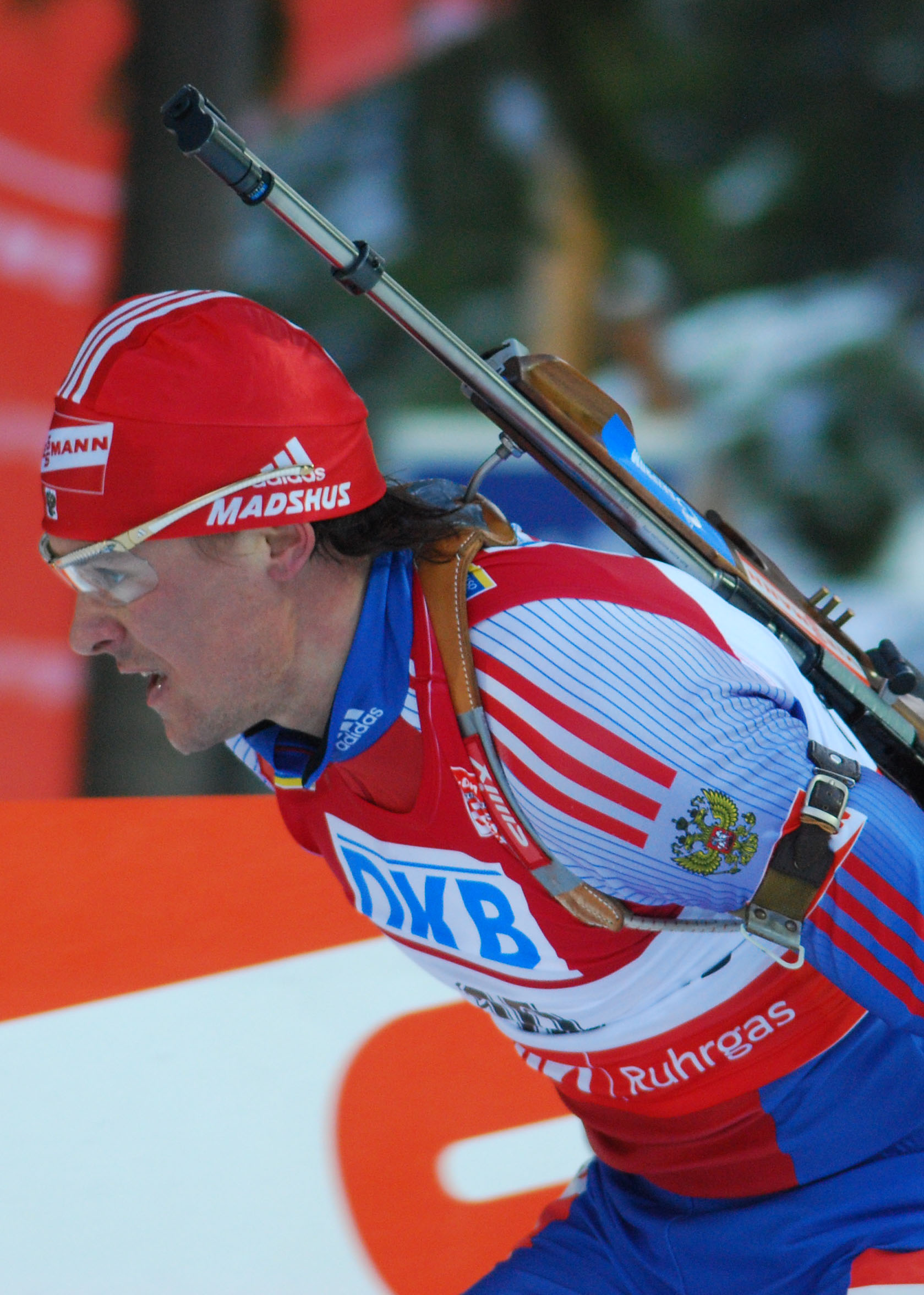
Dmitri Yaroshenko

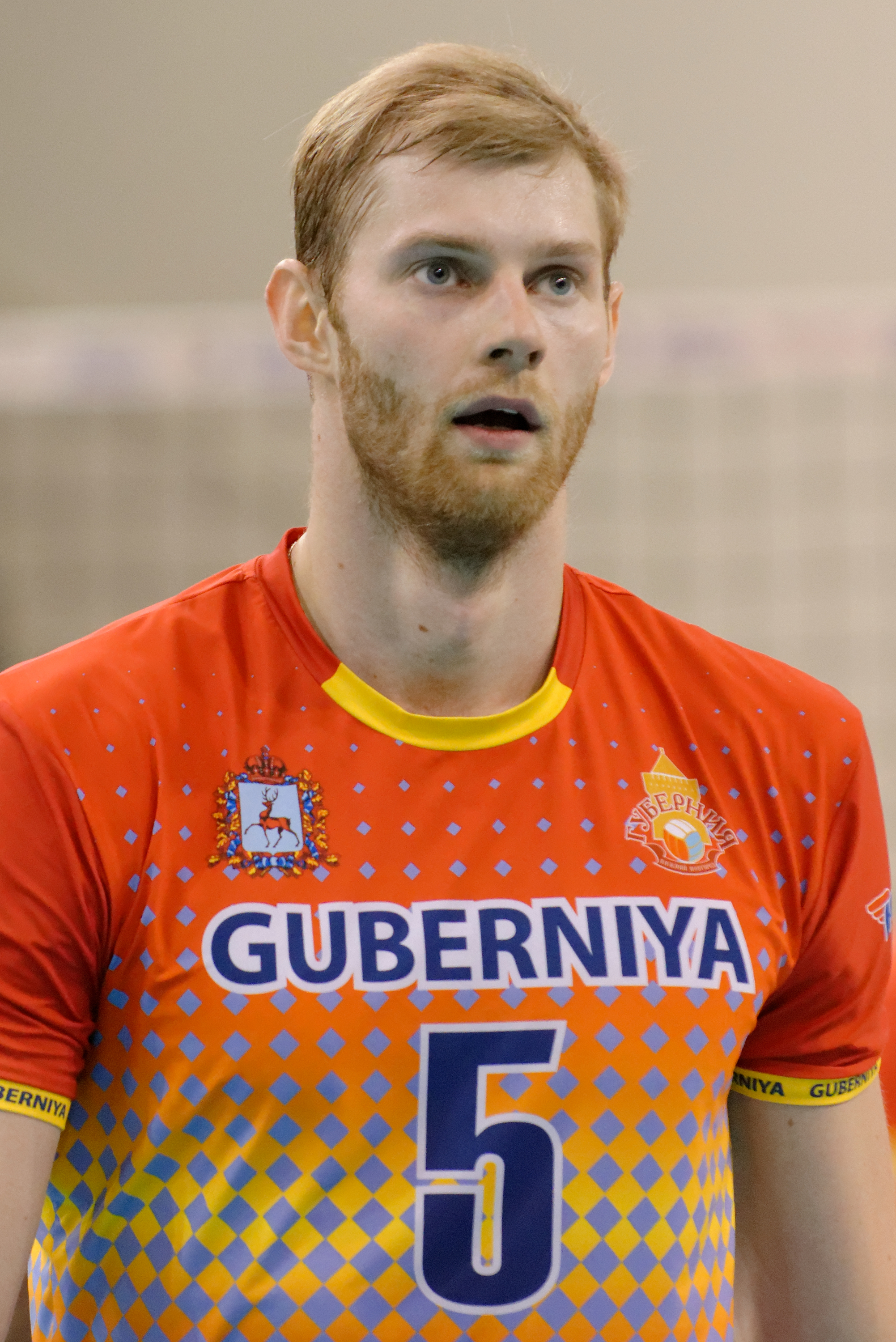
Aleksey Ostapenko

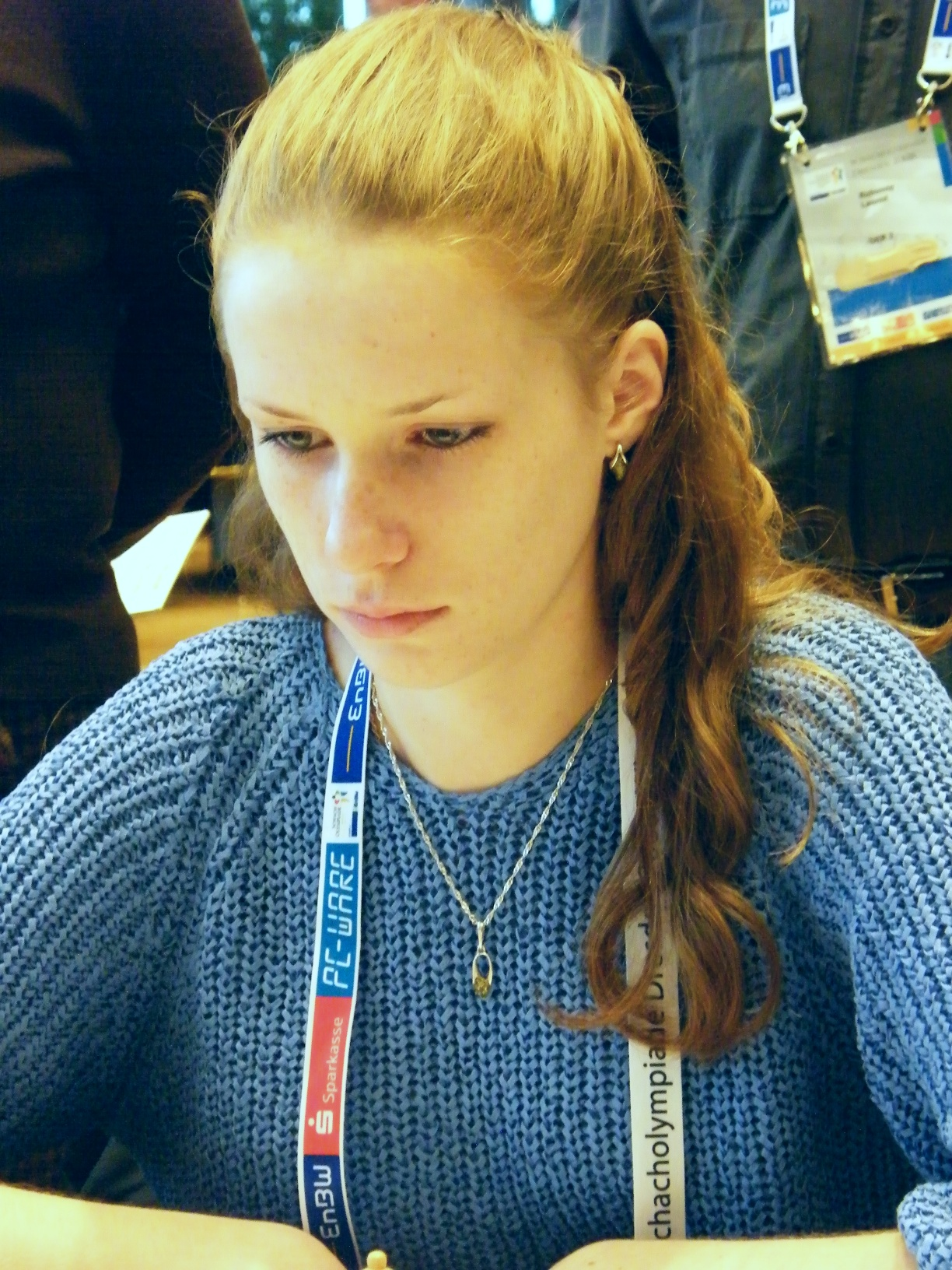
Valentina Golubenko

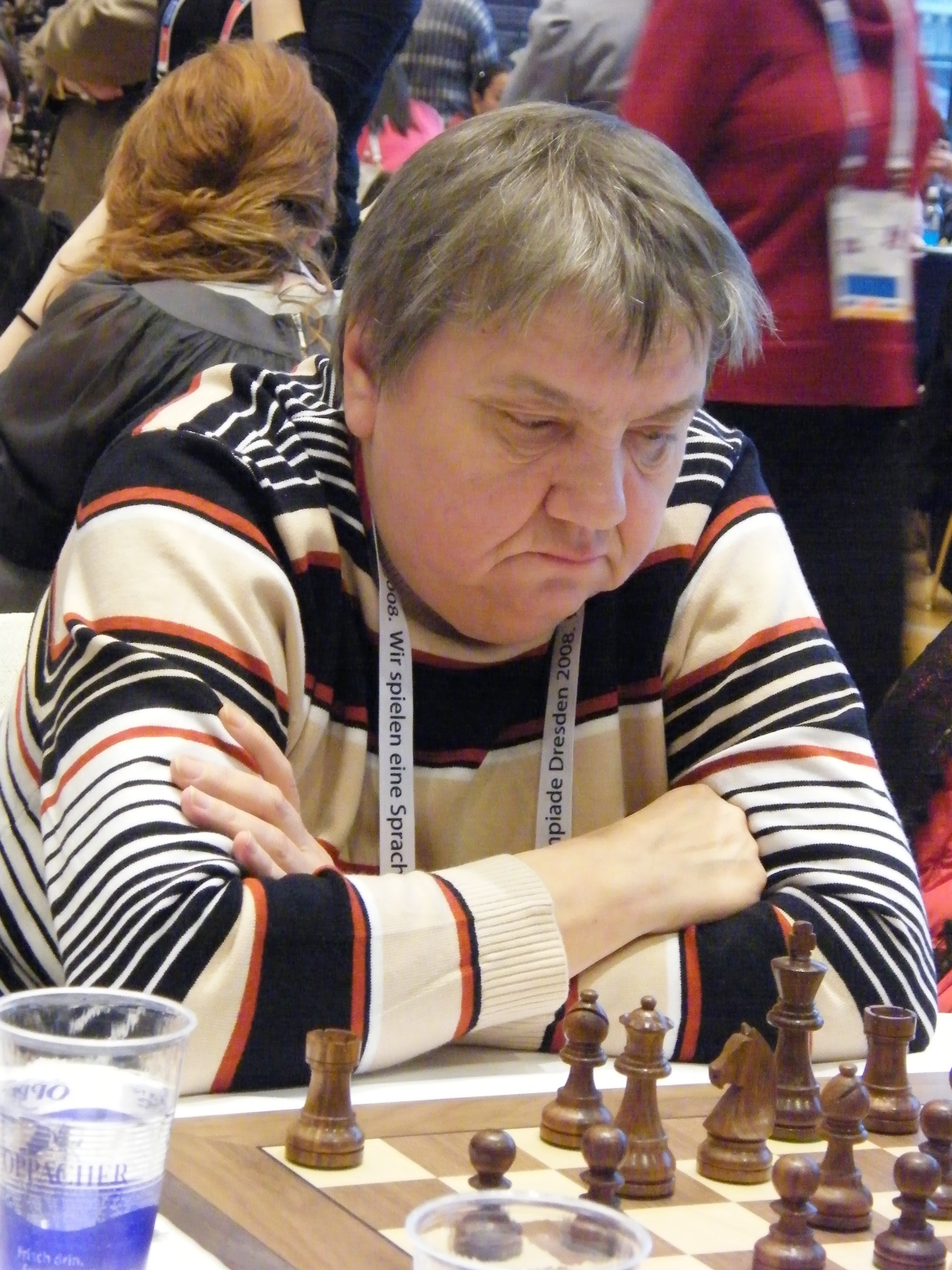
Tatjana Lematschko

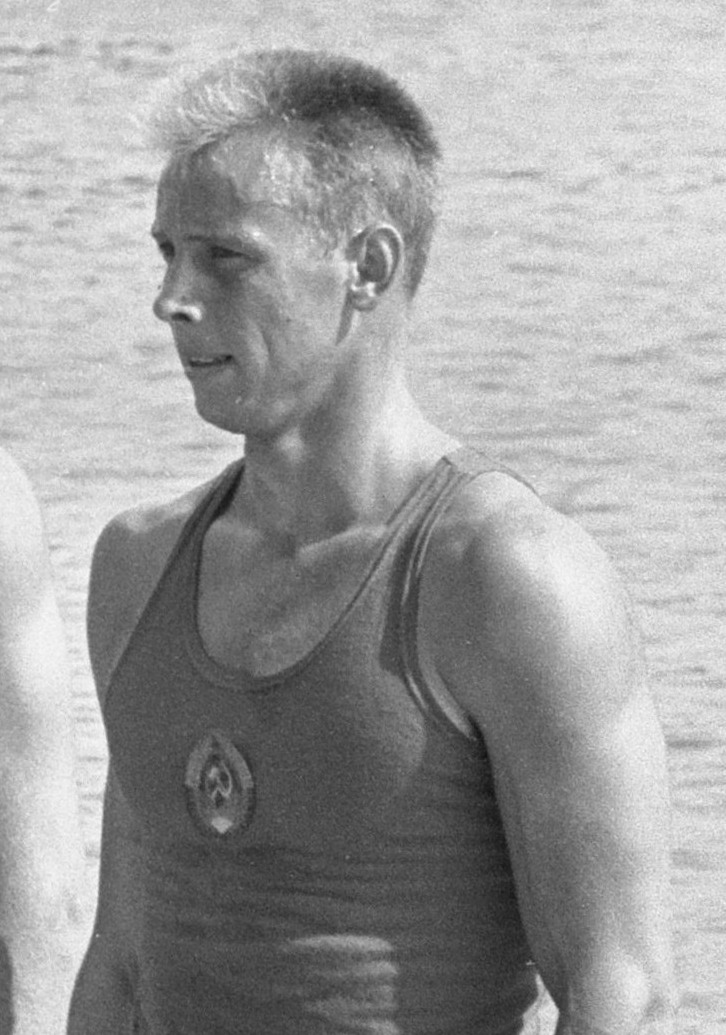
Vitaly Kurdchenko

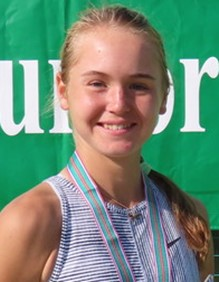
Maria Bondarenko

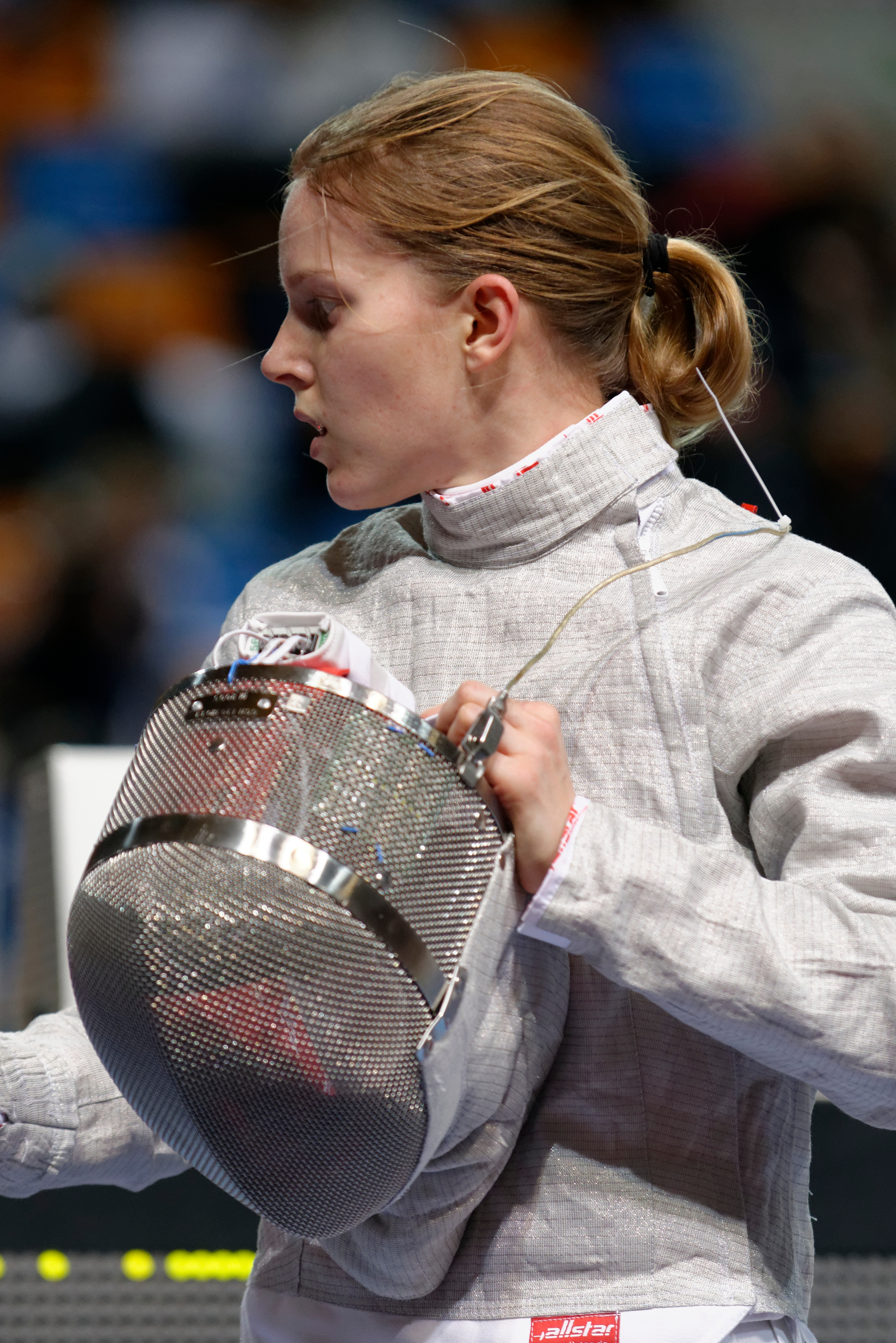
Yekaterina Dyachenko

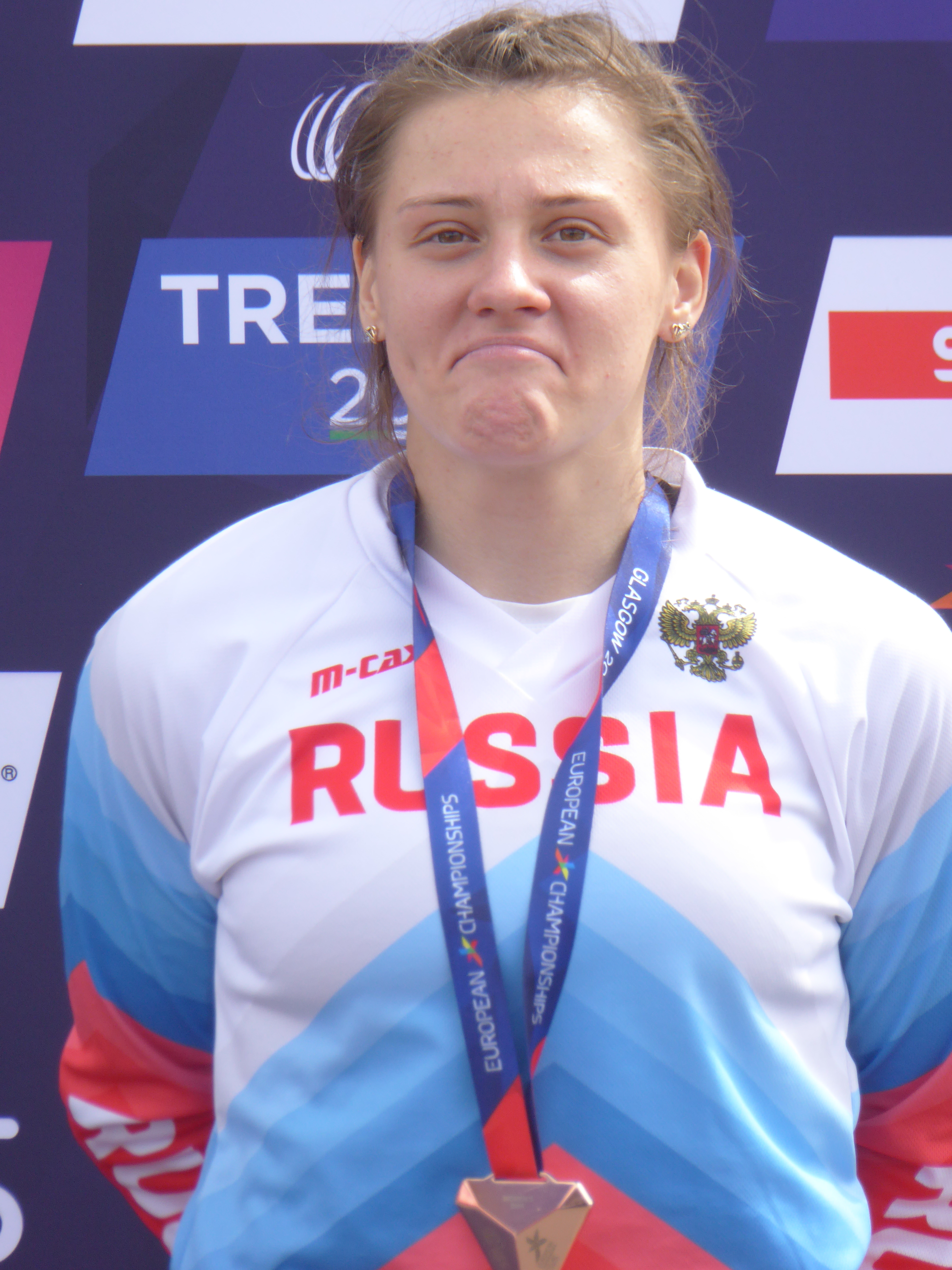
Yaroslava Bondarenko

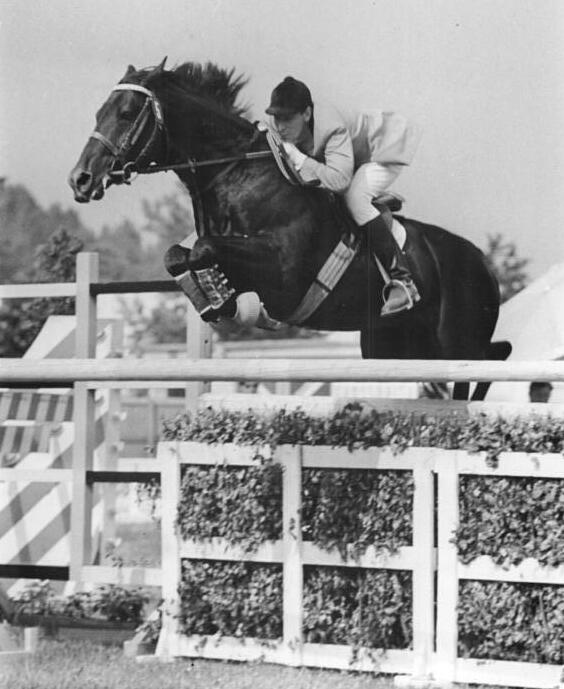
Gennady Samosedenko

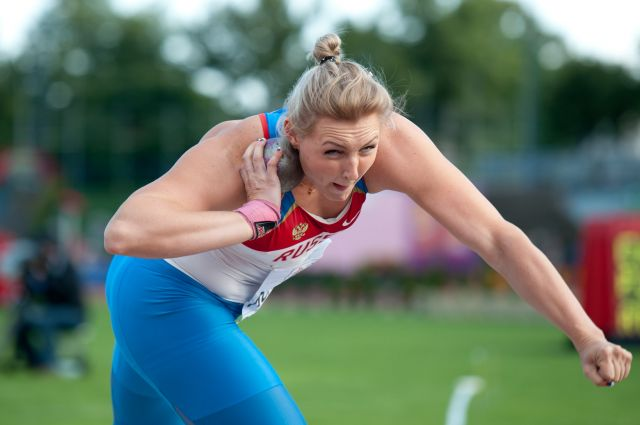
Yevgeniya Kolodko

- Natalya Akhrimenko – shot putter
- Andrei Akimenko – football player
- Vladyslav Akimenko – Soviet competition sailor
- Mikhail Akimenko, high jumper
- Vladislav Aksyutenko – footballer
- Loran Alekno – volleyball player for VC Zenit Kazan
- Vladimir Alekno – volleyball player
- Kirill Alekseenko – chess grandmaster
- Bogdan Aleshchenko – former football midfielder
- Sergei Alifirenko – sport shooter
- Margarita Aliychuk – gymnast
- Dmitri Ananko – footballer
- Vyacheslav Andreyuk – Soviet footballer
- Aleksandr Andrienko – alpine ski racer
- Viacheslav Andrusenko – swimmer
- Iya Andrushchak – footballer
- Aleksandr Andryushchenko – professional football coach and former player, currently a sports department manager for FC Rostov
- Vladimir Andryushchenko – Paralympic athlete
- Vitaly Anikeyenko – ice hockey player
- Natalia Annenko – former ice dancer who competed for the Soviet Union
- Aleksandr Antipenko – footballer
- Oleg Antonenko – ice hockey player
- Aleksey Antonyuk – football coach and former player
- Marina Antonyuk – track and field athlete who competed in the shot put
- Andrey Anufriyenko – speed skater
- Dmitry Apanasenko – swimmer
- Anna Arina Marenko – tennis player
- Vasyl Arkhypenko – Soviet athlete who competed mainly in the 400 metre hurdles
- Dmitry Arsenyuk – ice hockey forward
- Maksim Artemchuk – footballer
- Aleksandra Artyomenko – alpine skier
- Aleksandr Aseledchenko – triple jumper
- Anna Astapenko – footballer
- Liudmyla Avdieienko – athlete. She competed in the women's high jump at the 1988 Summer Olympics, representing the Soviet Union
- Dmitri Avramenko – footballer
- Gennadi Avramenko – Soviet sport shooter
- Roman Avramenko – javelin thrower
- Natalie Avseenko (Natalya Avseyenko) – former free diving champion featured in a photographic series illustrating the Orda Cave, a gypsum crystal cave underneath the western Ural Mountains
- Vladimir Avsyuk – footballer
- Mikhail Azarenko – sport shooter
- Anton Babchuk – ice hockey defenceman
- Aleksei Babenko – footballer
- Yuri Babenko – ice hockey player
- Olga Badelka – chess player
- Stepan Baidiuk – Soviet long-distance runner
- Nikita Bakalyuk – footballer
- Konstantin Bakun – Russian/Ukrainian volleyball player
- Ivan Balchenko – pair skater
- Anna Baranchuk – rugby sevens player
- Andrei Bashko – ice hockey player
- Konstantin Bazelyuk – footballer
- Tatiana Bazyuk – windsurfer
- Vitali Belichenko – footballer
- Yury Berezhko – volleyball player
- Artyom Bezrodny – Russian association footballer
- Yevgeny Bezruchenko – swimmer
- David Bidlovsky – football player
- Yulia Blindyuk – cyclist
- Anastasia Bliznyuk – group rhythmic gymnast
- Nikolai Bochko – footballer
- Anastasia Bodnaruk – chess player who holds the FIDE titles of International Master (IM) and Woman Grandmaster (WGM)
- Grigori Bogemsky – football player
- Vladislav Boiko – ice hockey player
- Aleksandr Bondar – Russian (since 2014) diver
- Sergei Bondar – professional football coach and former player
- Anatoliy Bondarchuk – retired Soviet hammer thrower, hammer throw coach
- Irina Bondarchuk – former long-distance runner
- Alexei Bondarenko – gymnast
- Maksim Bondarenko – footballer
- Maria Bondarenko – tennis player
- Sergei Bondarenko – footballer
- Viktor Bondarenko – football coach and former player
- Yaroslava Bondarenko – cyclist
- Gennadi Bondaruk – professional football coach and former player
- Stanislav Boreyko – sprint canoeist
- Valentin Boreyko – Soviet Olympic rower
- Georgy Borisenko – Soviet correspondence chess grandmaster and chess theoretician
- Grigory Borisenko – footballer
- Maksim Borisko – footballer
- Mikhail Borodko -footballer
- Aleksandr Borodyuk – footballer
- Andrei Bovtalo – footballer
- Pavel Boychenko – former professional ice hockey player
- Maksim Boychuk – footballer
- Svetlana Boyko, fencer
- Natalya Boyko (1946–1996) – Soviet canoeist
- Sergei Boyko (born 1971) – footballer
- Sergei Bozhko – footballer
- Yevgeniy Brago – Olympic rower
- Natalia Bratiuk – Paralympic cross country skier and biathlete
- Ekaterina Bratko – footballer
- Pyotr Brayko – athlete who specialised in the high jump
- Viktor Budyansky – retired association footballer who played as a midfielder
- Anastasia Bukhanko – tennis player
- Anton Bukhanko – ice hockey player
- Aleksandr Bulashenko – footballer
- Vladimir Bulatenko – footballer
- Maksim Burchenko – footballer
- Valeri Burlachenko – footballer
- Leonid Buryak – footballer, represented the USSR national team at international level
- Anton But – former professional ice hockey winger
- Dmitri Butaliy – football player
- Ivan Butaliy – professional football coach and former player
- Aleksandr Butenko – footballer
- Boris Butenko – Soviet athlete, who competed in the men's discus throw at the 1952 Summer Olympics
- Sergei Butenko – football coach and former player
- Valeri Butenko (1941–2020) – Soviet footballer
- Viktor Butenko – track and field athlete competing in the discus throw
- Aleksandr Butko – volleyball player, a member of Russia men's national volleyball team and Russian club Ural Ufa, 2012 Olympic Games
- Anatoliy Byshovets – Soviet and Russian football manager and former Soviet international striker
- Dmitry Chelovenko – ski jumper
- Aleksandr Cherevko – footballer
- Yuri Chesnichenko – ice dancer
- Igor Chislenko – Soviet association football player
- Pavel Chumachenko – shot putter
- Sergei Chumachenko – footballer
- Yevgeni Chumachenko – footballer
- Iryna Chunykhovska – former sailor, who competed for the Soviet Union
- Artyom Danilenko – footballer
- Dmitriy Danilenko – fencer
- Viktoriia Danilenko – gymnast
- Vladimir Danilenko – Paralympic swimmer
- Ruslan Dashko – handball player
- Mikhail Dasko – former long-distance runner who competed for the Soviet Union and later Russia
- Pavel Datsyuk – professional ice hockey player, currently an unrestricted free agent
- Vassili Davidenko – cyclist
- Nikolay Davydenko – tennis player
- Philipp Davydenko – tennis player
- Andrei Demchenko – footballer
- Albert Demchenko – luger
- Andriy Demchenko – football coach and former midfielder
- Anton Demchenko – chess grandmaster
- Vasily Demchenko – ice hockey player
- Victoria Demchenko – luger
- Konstantin Demenko – professional football coach and former player
- Maksim Demenko – football manager and former football player
- Svetlana Demidenko – long-distance runner and mountain runner
- Viktor Demidenko – Soviet road cyclist
- Anatoliy Demyanenko – football coach and former player
- Oleksiy Demyanyuk – high jumper
- Alexey Denisenko – taekwondo practitioner
- Grigori Denisenko – professional ice hockey winger
- Artem Derepasko – tennis player
- Leonid Derevyanko – Soviet sprint canoer who competed in the early to mid-1970s
- Roman Derlyuk- ice hockey defenceman
- Ilya Dervuk – ice hockey defenceman
- Olga Detenyuk – swimmer who specialized in breaststroke
- Olga Deyko – racing cyclist
- Vitalia Diatchenko – tennis player
- Valeri Didenko (born 1946) – Soviet canoeist
- Viktor Diduk – Soviet rower
- Aleksandr Dimidko – fooyball player
- Aleksandr Dmitrenko – kickboxer
- Ekaterina Dmitrenko – footballer
- Oleg Dmitrenko – footballer
- Viktor Dmitrenko – footballer
- Valentin Dmitriyenko – hammer thrower
- Igor Dobrovolski – football manager and former player
- Alexander Donchenko – chess grandmaster
- Natalya Donchenko – speed skater
- Anatoly Donika – ice hockey defenceman
- Vitali Doroshenko – footballer
- Yuri Doroshenko – professional football player
- Mayya Doroshko – swimmer
- Anastasia Dotsenko – cross-country skier
- Sergei Dotsenko – Soviet football player and coach
- Mikhail Dovgalyuk – swimmer
- Vladimir Dratchko – judoka
- Alexander Dubchenko – cyclist
- Alexei Dudchenko – acrobatic gymnast
- Arsenii Dukhno – gymnast
- Olga Dvirna – middle-distance runner
- Alexander Dyachenko – sprint canoer
- Aleksey Dyachenko – fencer
- Fyodor Dyachenko – footballer
- Konstantin Dyachenko – footballer
- Rod Dyachenko – soccer player
- Yekaterina Dyachenko – fencer
- Yuri Dyadyuk – footballer
- Ivan Dyagolchenko – footballer
- Heorhiy Dybenko (born 1928) – Soviet athlete
- Yaroslav Dyblenko – ice hockey defenceman
- Lyudmila Dymchenko – freestyle skier
- Artem Dzyuba – soccer player
- Ivan Edeshko – professional basketball player and coach
- Anna Efimenko – Paralympic swimmer
- Svetlana Egorenko – swimming coach
- Alexander Emelianenko – professional mixed martial artist
- Fedor Emelianenko – professional mixed martial artist
- Alexei Eremenko (born 1983) – Russian-Finnish association football player
- Igor Eremenko – ice dancer
- Roman Eremenko – footballer
- Sergei Eremenko – footballer
- Andrey Esipenko – chess grandmaster
- Alexander Evtushenko – racing cyclist
- Grigory Falko – swimmer
- Artyom Fedchuk – footballer
- Denis Fedenko – footballer
- Mykola Fedorenko – retired Soviet football player and a current Ukrainian football coach
- Andrey Fedoriv – former 200-meter sprinter
- Aleksandra Fedoriva – sprinter
- Sergey Fedosienko – powerlifter
- Sergey Fesenko, Sr. – swimmer
- Yekaterina Fesenko – Soviet hurdler
- Ivan Fischenko – ice hockey player
- Mikhail Fisenko – ice hockey player
- Ruslan Fishchenko – footballer
- Sergey Flerko – weightlifter
- Aleksandr Fomchenko – rower
- Yuliya Fomenko – backstroke swimmer
- Mykhaylo Fomenko – football player and coach
- Oleg Fomenko – football player
- Pavel Fomenko – high jumper
- Ekaterina Gaiduk (Davydenko) – handball player
- Matvey Galchenko – chess player
- Alex (Alexandrovich) Galchenyuk – ice hockey center
- Alexander (Nikolaevich) Galchenyuk – former professional ice hockey player
- Igor Gamula – professional football coach and former player
- Aleksei Ganiuk – swimmer
- Emma Gapchenko – archer
- Anna Gavrilenko – group rhythmic gymnast and Olympic champion
- Ivan Gavrilenko – ice hockey player
- Yevgeniy Gavrilenko – Soviet athlete who competed mainly in the 400 metre hurdles
- Nina Gavrylyuk – cross-country skier who competed from 1987 to 2003
- Aleksei Gerasimenko – football coach
- Dmitrij Gerasimenko – judoka
- Oleg Gerasimenko – footballer
- Vladislav Gerasimenko – swimmer
- Vitali Glushchenko – skier
- Vitali Glushchenko – footballer
- Ekaterina Gnidenko – track cyclist
- Alexander Godynyuk – Soviet professional ice hockey defenceman
- Yevgeni Golovchenko – football player
- Valentina Golubenko – chess player
- Ilya Gomanyuk – footballer
- Murat Gomleshko – footballer
- Nikolay Gomolko – rower who competed in the eights event at the 1960 Summer Olympics for the Soviet Union
- Sergey Gomolyako – ice hockey player
- Angelina Goncharenko – ice hockey player
- Oleg Goncharenko – Distinguished Master of Sports of the USSR, first male Soviet speed skater to become World Allround Champion
- Viktor Goncharenko – footballer
- Aleksandr Gorbatyuk – footballer
- Viktor Gordiuk – ice hockey right wing
- Ruslan Gordiyenko – footballer
- Konstantin Gordiyuk – footballer
- Viktor Gordiyuk – former ice hockey right wing
- Astemir Gordyushenko – footballer
- Pyotr Gornushko – equestrian
- Oleg Gorobiy – canoe sprinter who competed from 1990 to 2003
- Kirill Gotsuk – footballer
- Svetlana Goundarenko – judoka, professional wrestler and mixed martial artist
- Nikita Goylo – footballer
- Dmitri Gradilenko – footballer
- Andrei Granichka – Paralympic swimmer
- Svetlana Grankovskaya – track cyclist
- Aleksandr Grebenyuk – Soviet decathlete
- Evgenia Grebenyuk – tennis player
- Yulia Grichenko – footballer
- Evgeny Grigorenko – ice hockey player
- Mikhail Grigorenko – professional ice hockey forward for HC CSKA Moscow of the Kontinental Hockey League (KHL)
- Igor Grigorenko, Russian professional ice hockey right winger
- Alexander Grischuk – chess grandmaster
- Sergey Grishchenko – skier
- Vladimir Grishchenko – footballer
- Oksana Grishuk – former competitive ice dancer.
- Igor Griszczuk – retired basketball player and current coach
- Aleksei Gritsayenko – footballer
- Vitalii Gritsenko – Paralympic athlete
- Arseni Gritsyuk – professional ice hockey player
- Pavel Gromyko – basketball player
- Anna Grudko – artistic gymnast
- Nikita Gubenko – slalom canoeist
- Ivan Gulko – football player
- Aleksei Gulo – professional footballer who played as a defender
- Irina Gumenyuk – triple jumper
- Artemi Gunko – football player
- Dmitri Gunko – football coach and former player
- Sergei Gunko – football coach and former player
- Yuri Gunko – Soviet ice hockey player
- Alexander Gutsalyuk – volleyball player
- Oleksandr Haydash – Russian (since 2014) professional football striker
- Volodymyr Herashchenko – Soviet professional football coach and former player
- Vladyslav Hevlych – footballer
- Tetyana Hlushchenko – former Soviet handball player who competed in the 1976 Summer Olympics
- Yaroslav Hodzyur – footballer who played as a goalkeeper
- Denys Holaydo – retired football midfielder
- Olga Hudenko – track cyclist
- Olha Huzenko – rower who competed for the Soviet Union in the 1976 Summer Olympics
- Aleksandr Iaremchuk – cross-country skier, para-biathlete and para-athlete
- Polina Iatcenko – tennis player
- Aleksandr Ignatenko – wrestler
- Aleksandr Ignatenko – footballer and coach
- Dmitry Ignatenko – footballer
- Petr Ignatenko – professional road racing cyclist
- Vladislav Ignatenko – football player who plays for FC Nosta Novotroitsk
- Konstantin Igropulo – handball player
- Irina Ilchenko – volleyball player
- Ksenia Ilchenko – volleyball player, playing as an outside-spiker
- Larisa Ilchenko – long-distance swimmer
- Stanislav Iljutcenko – footballer
- Tatiana Ilyuchenko – skier
- Viktor Isaychenko – footballer
- Oleg Isayenko – footballer
- Boris Isachenko - archer who competed for the Soviet Union
- Mykhaylo Ishchenko – Soviet handball goalkeeper
- Natalia Ishchenko – competitor in synchronized swimming
- Yan Ishchenko – football player
- Valentina Ivakhnenko – tennis player
- Alena Ivanchenko – racing cyclist
- Gennady Ivanchenko – Soviet weightlifter
- Ivan Ivanchenko – footballer
- Vyacheslav Ivanenko – Soviet race walker
- Aleksandr Ivanitsky – wrestler and Olympic champion in freestyle wrestling
- Ilya Ivanyuk – high jumper
- Elena Ivashchenko – judoka
- Pavel Ivashko – sprinter
- Aleksandr Ivchenko – footballer
- Dmitry Ivchenko – footballer
- Yevgeniy Ivchenko – Soviet athlete
- Dmitry Jakovenko – chess Grandmaster
- Aleksei Kalashnik – professional football player
- Ivan Kalchuk – footballer
- Anton Kalinitschenko – ski jumper
- Kirill Kaplenko – footballer
- Sergey Karetnik – football midfielder
- Vadim Karlashchuk – footballer
- Vasili Karmazinenko – footballer
- Marina Karnaushchenko – sprint athlete
- Andrey Karpenko – Soviet footballer and football functionary
- Nikolai Karpenko – footballer
- Ilya Karpuk – footballer
- Boris Katchouk - hockey player
- Elena Karpushenko – rhythmic gymnast
- Daniil Karpyuk – ice hockey forward
- Andrei Karyaka – Russian football coach and former player who played as a midfielder
- Svitlana Kashchenko – Russian-Nicaraguan sport-shooter
- Kostiantyn Kasianchuk – ice hockey player
- Oleksandr Kasyan – former professional footballer
- Yevgeni Kasyanenko – footballer
- Sergey Khandozhko – martial artist
- Nadezhda Kharchenko – footballer
- Valentina Kharchenko – track and field athlete
- Yuri Kharchenko – Soviet luger
- Irina Khlebko – badminton player
- Daniil Khlusevich – footballer who plays as a right midfielder for FC Spartak Moscow
- Oleksiy Khoblenko – footballer
- Nikita Khodorchenko – footballer
- Ilya Khomenko – competitive swimmer who specializes in breaststroke
- Dmitri Khristich – ice hockey player
- Victor Khryapa – former professional basketball player who last played for CSKA Moscow of the VTB United League
- Aleksandr Kibalko – speed skater
- Yekaterina Kibalo – swimmer
- Pavel Kireyenko – footballer
- Dmitri Kirichenko – footballer and coach
- Irina Kirichenko – Soviet sprint cyclist
- Vadim Kirichenko – Soviet footballer and manager
- Yury Kirichenko – taekwondo athlete
- Andrei Kirilenko – basketball executive and former professional basketball player
- Denis Kirilenko – footballer
- Alisa Kirilyuk – sailor, placed 13th in the women's 470 event at the 2016 Summer Olympics
- Andrey Kirilyuk – Olympic sailor from Sevastopol
- Vitaly Kirinchuk – swimmer
- Grigory Kiriyenko – fencer
- Valeri Kiriyenko – biathlete
- Yana Kirpichenko – cross-country skier
- Sergei Kishchenko – footballer
- Leonid Kiyenko – footballer
- Aleksandr Kleshchenko – football player
- Evgeny Kleshchenko – BMX rider
- Mikhail Klimchuk – ice hockey player
- Marina Klimenchenko – Paralympic shooter from Khabarovsk who won a silver medal at the 2012 Summer Paralympics
- Andrei Klimenko – footballer
- Anton Klimenko – footballer
- Artem Klimenko – professional basketball player
- Gleb Klimenko – ice hockey player
- Ksenia Klimenko – gymnast
- Viktor Klimenko –gymnast
- Aleksandr Kobenko – footballer
- Kirill Kolesnichenko – footballer
- Svetlana Kolesnichenko – synchronized swimmer
- Yevgeniya Kolodko – shot putter
- Aleksei Kolomiychenko – footballer
- Aleksandr Kolotilko – footballer
- Viktor Kolyadko – footballer
- Alexander Komaristy – ice hockey centre
- Nikolay Komlichenko (born 1973) – footballer
- Nikolay Komlichenko (born 1995) – footballer
- Anatoli Kondratenko – Soviet football striker
- Vasiliy Kondratenko – bobsledder
- Mark Kondratiuk – figure skater
- Andrei Kondratyuk – footballer
- Anatoly Kononenko – Soviet sprint canoer
- Vladimir Kononenko – footballer
- Kirill Kononenko- ice hockey player
- Artem Kononuk – sprint canoer
- Viktor Konovalenko – Soviet ice hockey goaltender
- Valeri Kopiy – footballer
- Aleksey Kornienko – footballer
- Igor Kornienko – former professional tennis player
- Valery Kornienko – Soviet pair skater
- Oleg Kornienko- Russian and Kazakhstani footballer
- Anatoliy Korobochka – former football midfielder
- Petro Korol – Soviet weightlifter
- Irina Koroleva (Zaryazhko) – volleyball player, who plays as a middle blocker
- Alexander Korolyuk – former professional ice hockey winger
- Tyberiy Korponay – Soviet footballer
- Dmitry Kosenko – footballer
- Gordey Kosenko – badminton player
- Petro Koshelenko – cyclist
- Alexandra Kosteniuk – chess grandmaster
- Aleksei Kostenko – footballer
- Konstantin Kostenko – Soviet sprint canoeist
- Olga Kostenko – sprint canoeist
- Valentina Kostenko – judoka
- Olena Kostevych – pistol shooter
- Vladimir Kostyuk – professional footballer
- Roman Kosyanchuk – footballer
- Ilya Kovalchuk – ice hockey player
- Aleksandr Kovalenko – retired USSR triple jumper
- Aleksandr Kovalenko – footballer
- Alevtina Kovalenko – bobsledder
- Alexander Kovalenko
- Andrei Kovalenko – former professional ice hockey forward
- Andrei Kovalenko (Russian footballer) – footballer
- Andrei Kovalenko – footballer
- Andrei Kovalenko – professional football coach and former player
- Artyom Kovalenko – football player
- Dmitri Kovalenko – footballer
- Mikhail Kovalenko – footballer
- Nikolai Kovalenko – ice hockey forward
- Oleg Kovalenko – ice hockey
- Ostap Kovalenko – footballer
- Sergei Kovalenko (sport shooter)
- Sergey Kovalenko – Soviet basketball player who won the gold medal with the Soviet basketball team in the 1972 Olympics, played for CSKA Moscow (1976–1980)
- Sergey Kovalenko (wrestler)
- Viktor Kovalenko (ice dancer)
- Vitali Kovalenko – volleyball player
- Dmitriy Kovtsun – discus thrower
- Oxana Kozonchuk – racing cyclist
- Valentyna Kozyr- Soviet athlete
- Tetyana Kozyrenko – footballer, who plays for Lokomotiv Moscow in the Women's Football League
- Boris Kramarenko – Soviet wrestler
- Dmitriy Kramarenko – goalkeepers coach at CSKA Moscow
- Ekaterina Kramarenko – artistic gymnast
- Lala Kramarenko – rhythmic gymnast
- Oleh Kramarenko (footballer born 1956) – Soviet footballer and coach
- Sergei Kramarenko (footballer, born 1994)
- Sergey Kramarenko (footballer, born 1946)
- Vladimir Kramnik – chess grandmaster and champion
- Sergei Krashchenko – footballer
- Oleg Krasilnichenko – footballer
- Viktor Krasko – Soviet swimmer
- Serhiy Krasyuk – Soviet Olympic former swimmer
- Alexander Kravchenko (skier)
- Vladimir Kravchenko (swimmer)
- Anastasia Kravchenko – ski-orienteering competitor and World Champion
- Valeri Kravchenko – Soviet volleyball player
- Igor Kravchuk – ice hockey player
- Konstantin Kravchuk (born 1985) – tennis player
- Serhiy Kravchuk – Soviet fencer
- Valery Kravchuk – retired Soviet heavyweight weightlifter
- Sergei Krestenenko – footballer
- Aleksandr Krikunenko – footballer
- Stanislav Kritsyuk – footballer
- Aleksandr Krivoruchko – football player
- Daniil Krivoruchko – footballer
- Olga Kucherenko – long jumper
- Alexander Kucheryavenko – ice hockey player
- Halyna Kukhar – Soviet figure skating coach and former competitive skater
- Ilya Kukharchuk – football (soccer) player
- Vadim Kuleshenko – footballer
- Sergei Kulichenko – footballer
- Vladislav Kulik – footballer
- Stanislav Kulinchenko – handball player
- Igor Kulish – Soviet football goalkeeper
- Alexey Kunchenko – mixed martial artist
- Vitaly Kurdchenko – Soviet rower
- Anton Kushniruk – footballer
- Vladimir Kuts – Soviet Olympic long-distance runner
- Aleksei Kutsenko – football player
- Yuriy Kutsenko – Soviet decathlete
- Aleksei Kutsero – footballer
- Andrei Kuzmenko – ice hockey player
- Anna Kuzmenko – figure skater
- Igor Kuzmenko (born 1970) – footballer
- Ivan Kuzmenko – swimmer
- Ivan Kuzmenko (born 1995) – swimmer
- Ekaterina Lagno – Russian (since 2014) chess grandmaster and champion * Natalya Lapitskaya – handball player who competed for the Soviet Union in the 1988 Summer Olympics
- Nikolai Latysh – professional football coach, assistant manager with FC Tobol
- Vladimir Lavrinenko – swimmer
- Angelina Lazarenko – volleyball player, member of the Russia women's national volleyball team
- Olga Lazarenko (born 1980) – skier
- Viktor Lazarenko- Soviet footballer
- Viktoriia Lazarenko – skier
- Vitaly Lazarenko – Russian/Soviet acrobat
- Anton Lazko – slalom canoer who competed in the early to mid-1990s
- Vladimir Lebed – footballer
- Igor Lebedenko – footballer
- Yelena Lebedenko – heptathlete
- Anatoliy Lebid – Soviet footballer
- Aleksandr Lebziak – boxer, three-time Olympian
- Tatjana Lematschko – chess player
- Sergei Lemeshko – footballer
- Valeri Lenichko – footballer
- Vladimir Leonchenko – footballer
- Roman Tkachuk – footballer
- Oleh Leschynskyi – former Soviet professional football midfielder and football coach
- Vyacheslav Leshchenko – professional ice hockey right winger
- Igor Leshchuk – football player who plays as goalkeeper for FC Dynamo Moscow
- Kseniia Levchenko – basketball player
- Volodymyr Levchenko – Soviet footballer
- Nadezhda Milinchuk – Soviet sprint canoer
- Andrei Liforenko – footballer
- Valeri Likhobabenko – footballer
- Natalya Linichuk – ice dancing coach and former competitive ice dancer for the Soviet Union
- Aleksandr Lipko – footballer
- Tatyana Litovchenko – Olympic freestyle swimmer
- Vyacheslav Litovchenko – professional ice hockey forward
- Vladimir Litvinenko – sledge hockey player
- Yekaterina Lobaznyuk – Olympic gymnast
- Yevgeny Lomach – sailor, represented Russian Empire at the 1912 Summer Olympics in Nynäshamn, Sweden in the 8
- Vladislav Lomko – racing driver
- Yulia Lozhechko – artistic gymnast
- Alisa Lozko – figure skater
- Stanislav Lugailo – Olympic volleyball player
- Daria Lukianenko – Paralympic swimmer
- Artem Lukyanenko – decathlete
- Yevgeniy Lukyanenko – pole vaulter
- Vladimir Lutchenko – retired Soviet ice hockey player
- Mikhail Lutsenko – handball player
- Yevgeni Lutsenko – football striker
- Ross Lupaschuk - hockey player
- Ruslan Lyashchuk – former football player
- Roman Lyashenko – ice hockey player
- Vyacheslav Lykho – shot putter
- Sergei Lysenko (footballer, born 1972)
- Sergei Lysenko (footballer, born 1976)
- Alina Lysenko – cyclist
- Danil Lysenko – track and field athlete
- Stanislav Lysenko (born 1972) – footballer
- Tatyana Lysenko – hammer thrower
- Viktor Lysenko – Soviet footballer
- Sofiya Lyskun – diver, medalist of the European Championships
- Vitaliy Lytvynenko – Soviet ice hockey player
- Artyom Makarchuk – footballer
- Aleksandr Makarenko – footballer
- Alina Makarenko – rhythmic gymnast
- Daria Makarenko – footballer
- Evgeny Makarenko – boxer
- Sergei Makarenko – retired Soviet sprint canoeist, competed from the late 1950s to early 1960s
- Lesya Makhno – volleyball player, member of the Russian national team that won the gold medal at the 2010 World Championship
- Ilya Makiyenko – footballer
- Aleksandr Maksimenko (footballer, born 1996)
- Aleksandr Maksimenko (footballer, born 1998)
- Artyom Maksimenko – footballer
- Elizaveta Malashenko – handball player
- Eduard Malchenko – high jumper
- Sergey Malchenko – high jumper
- Lidia Malyavko – ice hockey player, currently playing in the Zhenskaya Hockey League (ZhHL) with Tornado Dmitrov
- Dmitry Malyshko – biathlete
- Andrei Mamatyuk – footballer
- Sergei Mamchur – football defender.
- Sergei Mandreko – footballer
- Oleksandr Mantsevych – rower who competed for the Soviet Union in the 1980 Summer Olympics
- Alexey Marchenko – professional ice hockey defenceman
- Igor Marchenko (swimmer)
- Kirill Marchenko – professional ice hockey winger
- Oleksandr Marchenko – Soviet Olympic rower
- Vladimir Marchenko (gymnast) – Olympic athlete
- Sergey Marchuk – speed skater
- Tatyana Markvo – rower
- Alexander Martynyuk – ice hockey player who played in the Soviet Hockey League
- Vyacheslav Marushko – Soviet footballer
- Viktor Maryenko – Soviet football player and coach
- Ruslan Mashchenko – hurdler and sprinter
- Vladimir Maslachenko – Soviet footballer
- Olha Maslivets – Olympic windsurfer
- Anna Matiyenko – volleyball player
- Yelena Matiyevskaya (Bratishko) – rower who competed in the 1980 Summer Olympics
- Sergei Matsenko – chess grandmaster
- Semyon Matviychuk – footballer
- Dmitri Matviyenko – footballer
- Dmytro Matviyenko – footballer
- Viktor Matviyenko – Soviet football player and coach
- Vladislav Matviyenko – footballer
- Yaroslav Matviyenko – footballer
- Stanislav Matyash – footballer
- Andrey Melnichenko (skier)
- Ilona Melnichenko – Soviet ice dancer
- Alexei Melnichuk – ice hockey player
- Nikolai Melnitsky – sport shooter who competed for the Russian Empire in the 1912 Summer Olympics
- Denis Metlyuk – professional ice hockey player
- Filipp Metlyuk – professional ice hockey defenceman
- Mariya Mikhailyuk – sprinter
- Viktor Mikhalchuk – Olympic volleyball player
- Grigori Mikhalyuk – footballer
- Dmitry Mikhaylenko – football player who plays for FC Khimik Dzerzhinsk
- Dmitry Mikhaylenko – former football player, who played for the main squad of FC Volga Nizhny Novgorod in a Russian Cup against FC SKA-Energiya Khabarovsk on 30 October 2013
- Elena Mikhaylichenko – handball player for CSKA Moscow and the Russian national handball team
- Artur Minchuk – Russian pair skating coach and former competitor
- Valeri Minko – footballer
- Aleksei Miranchuk and Anton Miranchuk – twin Russian soccer players of Ukrainian origin from Kuban.
- Andrei Miroshnichenko – footballer
- Ivan Miroshnichenko (ice hockey)
- Sergei Miroshnichenko (footballer) – footballer
- Veronika Miroshnichenko – tennis player
- Viktor Miroshnichenko – Olympic boxer
- Mikhail Mishchenko – footballer
- Aleksandr Mishchuk – footballer
- Igor Misko – ice hockey player
- Vyacheslav Mogilny – footballer
- Alexander Moiseenko – 2013 European chess champion
- Vadim Moiseenko – chess grandmaster (2011)
- Valentin Moldavsky – Russian (since 2014) combat sambo and mixed martial arts practitioner, World and European Champion in +100 kg
- Oleg Moliboga – Soviet volleyball player
- Roman Monchenko – rower
- Ksenia Monko – ice dancer
- Maria Monko – ice dancer
- Aleksei Morochko – footballer
- Pavel Moroz – volleyball player, a member of Russia men's national volleyball team and Russian club Fakel Novy Urengoy
- Ilya Moseychuk – footballer
- Alexander Moskalenko (chess player)
- Alexander Moskalenko – trampolinist
- Larysa Moskalenko – former sailor, competed for the Soviet Union
- Nikolay Moskalenko – football goalkeeper
- Vitaliy Moskalenko – triple jumper
- Vera Moskalyuk – judoka
- Dmitry Muserskiy – volleyball player, member of the Russia men's national volleyball team, 2012 Olympic Champion, 2013 European Champion, gold medallist of the 2011 World Cup and multiple World League medallist
- Mykola Musiyenko – former triple jumper who represented the Soviet Union
- Aleksandr Muzychenko – Soviet/Russian sailor, Olympic champion for the USSR team
- Nadezhda Myskiv – footballer
- Anna Nagornyuk – ice dancer
- Serhei Nahorny – Soviet sprint canoeist
- Devid Naryzhnyy – ice dancer
- Maksim Nasadyuk – footballer
- Semyon Nastusenko – footballer
- Vladimir Natalukha – Soviet sprint canoeist
- Sergei Natalushko – footballer
- Aleksandr Naumenko (footballer) (born 1997) – Russian football player
- Vladlen Naumenko – footballer
- Tatyana Navka – former competitive ice dancer
- Viktor Navochenko – footballer
- Anastasia Nazarenko – gymnast
- Anton Nazarenko – badminton player
- Leonid Nazarenko – Soviet-Russian football player and coach
- Yegor Nazarenko – footballer
- Sergei Nechay – footballer
- Ivan Nedelko – tennis player
- Alexey Negodaylo – bobsledder
- David Nemirovsky - ice hockey player
- Mikhail Nemirovsky - ice hockey player
- Ilya Nekolenko – ice hockey player
- Anatoli Nemchenko – footballer
- Konstantin Nerchenko – bodybuilder, powerlifter, strongman, master of Sambo, and personal trainer
- Nikolai Nesterenko – footballer
- Sergei Nesterenko – footballer
- Yekaterina Nesterenko – former alpine skier who competed in the 1998 Winter Olympics, where she finished 29th in the Women's downhill
- Yuri Nesterenko (footballer, born 1956) – footballer
- Yuri Nesterenko (footballer, born 1991)
- Mikhail Nichepurenko – field hockey player
- Andrei Nikitenko – ice hockey player
- Viktor Nikitenko – football coach
- Aleksandr Nikolaenko – badminton player
- Sergey Nikolskiy – sprint canoeist
- Anton Nimenko – figare skater
- Hryhoriy Nosko – Soviet footballer
- Vladimir Novokhatko – Soviet Greco-Roman wrestler, won a European title in 1968
- Maksim Oberemko – Russian (since 2015) windsurfer
- Valentina Ogiyenko – volleyball player
- Yegor Ogiyenko – ice hockey player
- Vera Olenchenko – Soviet athlete
- Valentyn Oletsky – Soviet professional ice hockey player
- Alexey Oleynik – mixed martial artist and combat sambo fighter currently signed with the Ultimate Fighting Championship, competing in their heavyweight division
- Anatoly Olizarenko – Soviet cyclist
- Aleksandr Omelchenko – footballer
- Igor Omelchenko – Soviet swimmer
- Sergey Omelchenko – Soviet skier
- Yegor Omelyanenko – ice hockey player
- Viktor Onopko – football coach
- Galina Onopriyenko – handball player
- Yevgeny Onopriyenko – footballer
- Volodymyr Onyshchenko – footballer, represented the USSR national team at international level
- Ivan Ordets – professional footballer
- Roman Oreshchuk – footballer
- Sergey Orlenko – volleyball player
- Liliya Osadchaya – former Soviet volleyball player, who won a silver medal at the 1976 Summer Olympics
- Sergei Osadchuk – professional football manager
- Alexander Osipenko (athlete) – ice hockey player
- Maksim Osipenko – footballer
- Sergey Ostapchuk – swimmer
- Aleksey Ostapenko – volleyball player
- Daniil Ostapenko – footballer
- Roman Ostashchenko – handball player
- Natalya Otchenash (Burdyga) – biathlete
- Dmitry Ovechko – rower
- Yevgeny Ovsiyenko – association football player
- Igor Pakhomenko – gymnast
- Alexander Panchenko – chess Grandmaster and honored coach, headed the All-Russian chess school
- Kirill Panchenko – footballer
- Viktor Panchenko – footballer
- Yuriy Panchenko – Ukrainian-born Russian coach and former volleyball player, competed for the Soviet Union in the 1980 Summer Olympics and in the 1988 Summer Olympics
- Anastasia Panchenko- sprint canoer
- Lyudmyla Panchuk – Soviet team handball player, competed in the 1976 Summer Olympics
- Vladimir Pantyushenko – footballer
- Kostyantyn Parkhomenko – football player who last played for FC Sakhalin Yuzhno-Sakhalinsk
- Svetlana Parkhomenko – tennis player
- Sergei Parshivlyuk – footballer
- Dmitry Pashytsky – volleyball player, member of the Russian club Zenit Saint Petersburg, Estonian Champion (2011), Russian Champion (2019)
- Kirill Pasichnik – footballer (born in Tutayev,Yaroslavl Oblast)
- Artyom Pasko – football player
- Aleksandr Pavlenko – football official and former player
- Aleksandr Pavlenko (footballer, born 1976)
- Aleksey Pavlenko (skier) – skier
- Andrei Pavlenko (footballer)
- Dmitry Pavlenko – handball player
- Vadim Pavlenko – footballer
- Semen Pavlichenko – luger
- Igor Pedan – strongman known for competing in the IFSA Strongman World Championships and World's Strongest Man
- Yevgeny Perevertaylo – professional football coach and former player
- Maxim Pestushko – ice hockey player
- Svetlana Petko – football goalkeeper
- Aleksandr Petrenko – triple jumper
- Alexander Petrenko – basketball player
- Artyom Petrenko – footballer
- Dmitri Petrenko – Soviet/Russian football player and coach
- Ihor Petrenko – Soviet pole vaulter
- Sergei Petrenko (footballer)
- Sergei Petrenko – Soviet ice hockey player
- Serhiy Petrenko – retired sprint canoeist
- Viktor Petrenko – Soviet World and Olympic champion in figure skating
- Vladimir Petrenko – Soviet figure skater
- Olga Pikhienko – circus performer who specializes in handbalancing and contortion
- Vladimir Pilguy – Soviet footballer
- Konstantin Pilipchuk – acrobatic gymnast, medalled at five Acrobatic Gymnastics World Championships
- Mykola Pinchuk – retired Soviet football player
- Vasili Pinchuk – former football player
- Maryan Plakhetko – Soviet footballer
- Rostislav Plechko – professional boxer who currently holds the Russian and WBA Asia heavyweight titles
- Ivan Poddubny – professional wrestler from the Russian Empire and later the Soviet Union
- Sergei Podpaly – footballer
- Dmitri Podruzhko – footballer
- Oleg Podruzhko – footballer
- Anna Pogorilaya – figure skater
- Nataliya Pohrebnyak – sprint athlete who specializes in the 100 metres
- Stanislav Pokhilko – ski jumper
- Anton Poleschuk – ice hockey player
- Ekaterina Poleshchuk – freestyle wrestler
- Mikhail Polischuk – freestyle swimmer
- Anatoliy Polishchuk – former volleyball player who competed for the Soviet Union in the 1976 Summer Olympics
- Dmitry Polishchuk – windsurfer
- Sofia Polishchuk – competitive ice dancer
- Anatoli Polivoda – basketball player who played for the Soviet Union
- Dmitri Polovinchuk – footballer
- Semyon Poltavskiy – medaling volleyball player
- Irina Poltoratskaya – Russian team handball player
- Anastasiya Polyanskaya (Yatsenko) – triathlete, Russian Supersprint Champion of the year 2009 and 2010
- Oleksandr Pomazun – footballer
- Aleksei Pomerko – footballer
- Mikhail Ponomarenko – footballer
- Sergei Ponomarenko – ice dancer
- Sergei Yuryevich Ponomarenko – footballer
- Svetlana Ponomarenko – long-distance runner
- Valeri Popenchenko – Soviet boxer who competed in the middleweight division
- Dmitry Popko – tennis player
- Hennadiy Popovych – Soviet footballer
- Lyudmila Porubayko – Soviet swimmer
- Oleg Pravilo – footballer
- Sergei Pravosud – football player
- Andrei Pridyuk – footballer
- Sergei Prikhodko (footballer, born 1962)
- Sergei Prikhodko (footballer, born 1984)
- Yuriy Prokhorenko – former Olympic pole vaulter
- Evgeniy Prokopchuk – judoka
- Alena Prokopenko – judoka
- Anastasia Prokopenko – badminton player
- Dmitri Prokopenko – footballer
- Gennady Prokopenko – Soviet-Russian ski jumper
- Georgy Prokopenko – retired Soviet swimmer who competed at the 1960 and 1964 Summer Olympics
- Pavel Prokopenko – pole vaulter
- Viktor Prokopenko – football player and coach who played for the Soviet forces in East Germany and the Ukrainian SSR including teams of the Soviet Top League and later worked as a coach in Russia and Ukraine
- Yevhen Prokopenko – footballer
- Oleg Protsenko – triple jumper
- Vyacheslav Protsenko – professional football coach and former player
- Yevgeniya Protsenko – water polo player
- Stanislav Prychynenko – footballer
- Olha Puhovska – Soviet rower
- Anna Punko – handball player
- Aleksandr Putsko – footballer
- Vasili Pyanchenko – footballer
- Vitali Pyanchenko – footballer
- Roman Pylypchuk – professional football manager and former player, manager of Russian FC Chelyabinsk
- Vladimir Pyshnenko – swimmer
- Aleksandr Radchenko (footballer)
- Aleksandr Nikolayevich Radchenko – association football player
- Dmitri Radchenko – association football player
- Mikhail Radchenko – footballer
- Nikolai Radchenko – footballer
- Dmitri Radchuk – ice hockey player
- Yaroslav Rakitskyi – footballer currently playing as a defender for Russian club FC Zenit Saint Petersburg
- Andrey Rapeyko – former professional footballer
- Igor Rasko – former professional ice hockey centre
- Andrey Rasolko – ice hockey player
- Roman Razbeyko – track and field athlete
- Vera Rebrik – Russian (since 2015) track and field athlete who competes in the javelin throw
- Stefan Reshko – Soviet former professional footballer
- Wladimir Resnitschenko- fencer
- Ivan Revenko – para-athlete
- Elena Riabchuk – former pair skater
- Roman Romanchuk – Russian (since 2000) amateur boxer
- Vladimir Romanenko – footballer
- Olesia Romasenko – sprint canoeist
- Olga Romasko – biathlete
- Aleksandr Rudenko (footballer, born 1993) – goalkeeper
- Aleksandr Rudenko (footballer, born 1999) – forward
- Antonina Rudenko – retired Soviet swimmer who won a gold medal in the 4 × 100 m freestyle relay at the 1966 European Aquatics Championships, setting a new European record
- Konstantin Rudenko – ice hockey player
- Lyudmila Rudenko – Soviet chess Grandmaster and champion
- Stanislav Rudenko – football coach
- Vladislav Rudenko – footballer
- Svyatoslav Ryabushenko – cyclist
- Maksim Rybalko – footballer
- Bogdana Sadovaia – field hockey player
- Dmitry Sakunenko – speed skater
- Oleg Salenko – soccer player
- Vladislav Samko – footballer
- Gennady Samosedenko – equestrian
- Petr Samoylenko – basketball player
- Kirill Samusenko – cyclist
- Pavel Samusenko – swimmer
- Oleg Sanko – footballer
- Aleksei Savchenko – footballer
- Anastasia Savchenko – pole vaulter
- Andrei Savchenko – Soviet ice hockey player
- Boris Savchenko – chess player
- Filipp Savchenko – ice hockey player
- Mikhail Savchenko – footballer
- Oxana Savchenko – Paralympic swimmer
- Borys Savchuk – Soviet sprinter, who competed in the men's 200 metres at the 1964 Summer Olympics representing the Soviet Union
- Bogdan Savenko – Soviet ice hockey player
- Galina Savenko – Soviet sprint canoer
- Lev Saychuk – Soviet fencer
- Aleksandr Sayenko – football player
- Andrei Semak – footballer
- Sergei Semak – football manager and former international midfielder, current manager of Zenit St. Petersburg
- David Semenchuk – footballer
- Vasilisa Semenchuk – freestyle skier who competed for the Soviet Union
- Evgeni Semenenko – figure skater
- Semyon Semenenko – footballer
- Mariia Seniuk – figure skater
- Artyom Serdyuk – footballer
- Aleksandr Sereda – footballer
- Dmitry Sergeyevich Kosenko – footballer
- Ernest Shabaylo – equestrian
- Aleksandr Shablenko – Soviet decathlete
- Alexandr Shabliy – martial artist
- Pavel Shakuro – footballer
- Marina Shamayko – tennis player
- Yuriy Shapochka – rower who competed for the Soviet Union in the 1980 Summer Olympics
- Lev Shatilo – Soviet javelin thrower
- Valery Shaveyko – former Soviet football player, Master of Sports of the USSR (1979), Russian coach, referee, and inspector
- Sergey Shavlo – former Soviet footballer
- Georgy Shayduko – sailor
- Fyodor Shcherbachenko – professional football coach and former player and referee; assistant coach with FC Ural Yekaterinburg
- Vladimir Shcherbak (footballer, born 1959)
- Artem Shcherbak – footballer
- Anatoli Shelest – football coach and former player
- Taras Shelest – football player, son of Anatoli
- Andrei Shepelenko – ice hockey player
- Olga Sherbak – handball player who plays for HC Lada
- Alexander Shevchenko (curler)
- Alexander Shevchenko (ice hockey)
- Alexander Shevchenko (tennis)
- Anastasiia Shevchenko – swimmer
- Anatoly Shevchenko – handball player
- Anzhelika Shevchenko – Russian (since 2017) runner who specializes in the middle-distance running events
- Dmitry Shevchenko (discus thrower)
- Dmitry Shevchenko (fencer)
- Igor Shevchenko – footballer
- Leonid Shevchenko – Soviet and Russian footballer and football coach
- Maksim Shevchenko (footballer, born 1983)
- Maksim Shevchenko (footballer, born 1980) – professional football coach and former player. He works as a deputy director at the academy of the Russian FC Lokomotiv Moscow
- Nikita Shevchenko – footballer
- Olga Shevchenko – ski-orienteering competitor
- Sofia Shevchenko – ice dancer
- Vitaly Shevchenko – footballer
- Yegor Shevchenko – footballer
- Yelena Shevchenko (gymnast) – Soviet artistic gymnast
- Yuri Shevchuk (figure skater)
- Andrey Shevchuk – javelin thrower
- Denis Shevchuk – footballer
- Stephan Shevchuk – sprint canoer
- Vladimir Shevchuk – footballer and manager
- Vyacheslav Shevchuk – footballer
- Natalya Shikolenko – javelin thrower who represented the Soviet Union
- Tatyana Shikolenko – track and field athlete who competed in the javelin throw
- Elena Shimko – badminton player
- Igor Shinkarenko – football player and manager
- Dmitri Shkidchenko – figure skating coach and former pair skater
- Alexander Shlemenko – martial artist
- Natalia Shliakhtenko – professional triathlete, Master of Sport
- Anastasia Shlyakhovaya – volleyball player
- Viktor Shmalko – cyclist
- Polina Shmatko – gymnast
- Svetlana Shnitko – sailor
- Aleksandr Shpakovsky – Soviet football player
- Anastasia Shpilevaya – former competitive ice dancer
- Yuri Shpiryuk – footballer
- Yevgeni Shurko – footballer
- Ilya Shvedyuk – footballer
- Anton Shvets – footballer who plays for Akhmat Grozny, as a central midfielder, represents the Russia national football team internationally
- Denis Shvidki – former professional ice hockey right wing
- Andrei Sidenko – footballer
- Alyona Sidko – cross-country skier who competed between 2000 and 2013
- Dmitri Sidorenko – footballer
- Elizaveta Sidorenko – Paralympic swimmer
- Kirill Sidorenko – ice hockey player
- Margarita Sidorenko – Paralympic archer
- Tatyana Sidorenko – Soviet volleyball player
- Vasiliy Sidorenko – Soviet-Russian hammer thrower
- Aleksandr Sidoryuk – footballer
- Kostiantyn Simchuk - hockey player
- Nataliya Sipchenko – swimmer, won a gold medal in the 4×100 m freestyle relay at the 1966 European Aquatics Championships, setting a new European record
- Vladislav Sitnichenko – footballer
- Alexander Sizonenko – Soviet professional basketball player
- Galina Skiba – ice hockey forward
- Nikolai Skladnichenko – ice hockey player
- Antonina Skorobogatchenko – handball player
- Yelena Slesarenko (Sivushenko) – high jumper
- Oxana Slivenko – weightlifter
- Vitaliy Slobodenyuk – Soviet sprint canoer
- Daniil Sobchenko – ice hockey player; was the member of the Russian national team that competed in the IIHF World Championship's under 18 and under 20 levels; winning gold for the country in 2011.
- Viacheslav Sobchenko – swimmer
- Aleksandr Sobko – former football player
- Yuri Sobol – footballer
- Aleksey Sokirskiy – Russian (since 2015) hammer thrower
- Olga Sokolovskaya – basketball player
- Rostislav Soldatenko – football player who plays for FC Alania Vladikavkaz
- Veniamin Soldatenko – Soviet athlete who competed mainly in the 50 km walk
- Natalya Solodkaya – footballer
- Zdislav Soroko – Soviet sprint canoer
- Vladislav Soromytko – footballer
- Gennadi Soshenko – footballer
- Oleksandr Spivak – football player of the FC Zenit Saint Petersburg football club
- Konstantin Spodarenko – Soviet ice hockey player
- Yuri Starunsky – Soviet volleyball player who competed for the Soviet Union in the 1972 Summer Olympics in Munich and the 1976 Summer Olympics in Montreal
- Yury Starunsky – Soviet volleyball player who competed for the Soviet Union in the 1972 Summer Olympics and in the 1976 Summer Olympics
- Nikolai Stasenko – ice hockey player
- Denis Stasyuk- ice hockey winger who currently plays for Metallurg Novokuznetsk of the Kontinental Hockey League (KHL)
- Valery Statsenko – diver
- Maria Stavitskaia – figure skater
- Ilya Stefanovich – football player, plays as forward for FC Volgar Astrakhan
- Ekaterina Stepanenko – football player
- Nikolay Stepanenko – Soviet sprint canoeist
- Oleg Stepanenko – Soviet hurdler
- Sergei Stepanenko – footballer
- Alesia Stepaniuk – judoka
- Oleg Stepko – Russian (since March 2018) gymnast
- Tatyana Stetsenko – Soviet rower
- Yuri Stetsenko – sprint canoeist who competed in the late 1960s and early 1970s
- Alexander Stetsurenko – kickboxer
- Vitali Stezhko – footballer
- Aleksandr Stolyarenko – footballer
- Mykhaylo Storozhenko – Soviet decathlete
- Galina Strutinskaya – chess player, trainer and international arbiter
- Anzhelika Stubailo – rhythmic gymnast
- Aleksandr Studzinsky – footballer
- Mikhail Sukhoruchenko – footballer
- Oleg Sukhoruchenko – bobsledder
- Alexei Sviatchenko – pair skater
- Pavel Sviridenko – footballer
- Vladimir Svizhuk – footballer
- Maksim Syshchenko – footballer
- Andrey Tarasenko – ice hockey player
- Andrey Tarasenko – powerlifter
- Stanislav Tarasenko – long jumper
- Vadim Tarasenko – speedway rider
- Vladimir Tarasenko – professional ice hockey right winger and alternate captain for the St. Louis Blues of the National Hockey League (NHL)
- Zakhar Tarasenko – footballer
- Stanislav Tarasyuk – footballer
- Vitali Tasenko – footballer
- Vladimir Tatarchuk (footballer, born 1987)
- Vladimir Tatarchuk (footballer, born 1966)
- Artemi Tchernenko – tennis player
- Sergei Tereschenko – ice hockey player
- Alexei Tereshchenko – professional ice hockey forward, who is currently an unrestricted free agent, he most recently played for Avangard Omsk of the Kontinental Hockey League (KHL).
- Konstantin Tereshchenko – former professional racing driver
- Sergei Tereshchenko – footballer
- Borys Tereshchuk – Soviet former volleyball player who competed for the Soviet Union in the 1968 Summer Olympics
- Vladislav Ternavsky – football coach and former player
- Vitaly Teslenko – ice hockey player
- Yegor Teslenko – footballer
- Ksenia Tikhonenko – basketball player for PBK Nadezhda Orenburg and the Russian national team
- Valeri Tikhonenko – Soviet basketball player and coach
- Stanislav Timchenko – figure skater
- Andrei Timoshenko – footballer and referee
- Ivan Timoshenko – footballer
- Vyacheslav Timchenko – Soviet ice hockey player
- Yelena Timoshenko – swimmer
- Daria Timoshenko- figure skater
- Aleksei Tishchenko – boxer
- Alisa Tishchenko – rhythmic gymnast
- Anatoly Tishchenko Sr. – sprint canoer, father of Anatoli and Olga
- Anatoly Tishchenko – sprint canoer, brother of Olga
- Andriy Tishchenko – Soviet former rower who competed for the Soviet Union in the 1980 Summer Olympics
- Evgeny Tishchenko – boxer
- Maksim Tishchenko – Russian professional football coach and former player
- Nikolai Tishchenko – Soviet football player
- Olga Tishchenko – sprint canoer, sister of Anatoly
- Stanislav Tishchenko – football player
- Tatyana Tishchenko – sprint canoer
- Viktor Tishchenko – football coach and former player
- Natalia Titorenko – chess player who held the FIDE title of Woman International Master (1982)
- Aleksandr Tkachenko – boxer
- Darya Tkachenko – Russian draughts player, Grandmaster and champion
- Ekaterina Tkachenko – alpine ski racer, a slalom specialist
- Ilia Tkachenko – ice dancer
- Ivan Tkachenko – ice hockey
- Leonid Tkachenko – former Soviet player and the Ukrainian-Russian coach
- Nadiya Tkachenko – Soviet pentathlete
- Oleksandr Tkachenko – footballer
- Oleksandr Tkachenko – rower
- Vladimir Tkachenko – basketball player
- Denis Tkachuk – footballer
- Roman Tkachuk – footballer
- Valeri Tkachuk – footballer
- Irina Tkatchuk – figure skater
- Denis Tolpeko – ice hockey player
- Alexey Toropchenko – ice hockey player
- Leonid Toropchenko – ice hockey player
- Vladislav Tretiak – celebrated Olympic ice hockey goaltender
- Krisztina Triscsuk – handballer
- Vitali Trofimenko – footballer
- Vladimir Trofimenko – pole vaulter
- Vyacheslav Trukhno – ice hockey player
- Aleksandr Tsarenko – football manager and former player
- Aleksandr Tsilyurik – footballer
- Ilya Tsymbalar – football player and coach
- Kseniia Tsymbalyuk – road and track cyclist, representing Russia at international competitions
- Dmitri Tsypchenko – footballer
- Aleksandr Tumenko – footballer
- Dmitri Tumenko – footballer
- Angelina Turenko – figure skating coach
- Oleg Tverdovsky – ice hockey defenceman
- Igor Tymonyuk – professional footballer who plays for Russian FC Saturn Ramenskoye
- Anatoliy Tymoshchuk – football coach and former midfielder, current assistant coach of the Russian Premier League club Zenit Saint Petersburg
- Denis Urubko – climber
- Ivan Usaty – handball player
- Iryna Ustymenko- former Olympic Soviet butterfly and freestyle swimmer
- Pavel Valentenko – ice hockey player
- Viktor Vashchenko – former professional footballer
- Liliya Vasilchenko – Soviet cross-country skier
- Olga Vasilchenko – rower
- Aleksandr Vasilenko – footballer
- Dmitri Vasilenko – gymnast
- Oleg Vasilenko – football manager
- Gennadiy Vassilenko – sprint canoeist
- Alexandr Vasyukhno – cyclist
- Nikolay Vdovichenko – footballer
- Valentin Vdovichenko – Soviet fencer
- Olesya Velichko – modern pentathlete
- Olga Velichko – Soviet fencer
- Yury Vengerovsky – volleyball player who competed for the Soviet Union in the 1964 Summer Olympics
- Igor Vinichenko – hammer thrower
- Valentin Vinnichenko – footballer
- Vitaly Vishnevskiy – former professional ice hockey defenceman
- Alexey Vitsenko – cross-country skier
- Yuri Vlasenko – ice dancer.
- Tatiana Voitiuk – Soviet former ice dancer
- Roman Voloshenko – ice hockey player
- Tatiana Volosozhar – pair skater
- Valeri Voytenko – football coach and player
- Mykola Vynnychenko – Soviet race walker
- Yaroslav Vynokur – billiards player
- Roman Vyzhenko – sprint canoeist
- Aleksey Yakimenko – fencer
- Anastasia Yakovenko – racing cyclist
- Mariya Yakovenko – javelin thrower
- Nikolay Yakovenko – wrestler
- Pavlo Yakovenko – football manager and retired football midfielder
- Vasil Yakusha – Soviet Olympic rower
- Vadim Yanchuk – football player
- Artem Yarchuk – ice hockey player
- Ivan Yaremchuk – Soviet footballer
- Vadim Yaroshchuk – former butterfly and medley swimmer from the Soviet Union, who won two bronze medals at the 1988 Summer Olympics in Seoul, South Korea
- Dmitri Yaroshenko – biathlete
- Nikolay Yaroshenko – triathlete
- Valeri Yaroshenko – footballer
- Evgeny Yarovenko – Soviet footballer and coach
- Vladimir Yashchenko – member of the Soviet national team and former world record holder in the high jump (233 cm, 234 cm and 235 cm).
- Danila Yashchuk – footballer
- Dmitri Yatchenko – footballer who played as a right-back
- Yevgeni Yatchenko – footballer
- Yevgeny Yatsinenko – sprint canoeist
- Aleksandr Yatsko – footballer
- Vladimir Yereshchenko – Soviet boxer
- Maksim Yermak – footballer
- Yury Yermolenko – sport shooter
- Alexander Yeryomenko – ice hockey goaltender who most notably played for Dynamo Moscow in the Kontinental Hockey League (KHL)
- Ilya Yeryomenko – footballer
- Konstantin Yeryomenko – Russian futsal player who was named the greatest futsal player of the 20th century
- Aleksei Borisovich Yeryomenko (born 1964) – Russian-Finnish association football player, father of Alexei Eremenko
- Aleksandr Yeshchenko – footballer
- Andrey Yeshchenko – footballer
- Sergei Yeshchenko – footballer
- Dmitry Yesipchuk – race walker
- Rinat Yesipenko – footballer
- Anatoli Yevtushenko – honored coach of the USSR (handball)
- Vadym Yevtushenko – footballer, represented the USSR national team at international level
- Artyom Yuran – footballer
- Sergei Yuran – professional football manager and former player, manager of SKA-Khabarovsk
- Ihor Yurchenko – Soviet footballer
- Ilya Yurchenko – footballer
- Makar Yurchenko – motorcycle racer
- Natalia Yurchenko – Soviet artistic gymnast
- Vasyl Yurchenko – Soviet sprint canoer
- David Yurchenko- footballer
- Igor Yushchenko – football coach
- Aleksei Yushchuk – football coach and former player
- Sergei Yuvenko – footballer
- Natalia Zabiiako – pair skater
- Sergey Zagorsky – equestrian, competed in the individual jumping at the 1912 Summer Olympics
- Anastasia Zagoruiko – biathlete
- Yevgeniy Zagorulko – high jump coach
- Boris Zaitchouk – Soviet hammer thrower
- Stanislav Zakharchenko – footballer
- Yevgeni Zakharchenko – footballer
- Platon Zakharchuk – footballer
- Stepan Zakharchuk – ice hockey player
- Andrei Zakharenko – association football player
- Vsevolod Zanko – swimmer
- Ivan Zavaliy – footballer
- Ruslan Zayerko – footballer
- Leonid Zayko – volleyball player
- Ignat Zemchenko – professional ice hockey player currently playing with HC Yugra in the Supreme Hockey League (VHL)
- Valeri Zhabko – footballer
- Oleksandr Zhabokrytskyi – football coach and former midfielder
- Leonid Zhabotynsky – weightlifter who set 19 world records in the superheavyweight class, and won gold medals at the 1964 and 1968 Olympic Games
- Vadim Zhelobnyuk – ice hockey player
- Sergey Zhinkarenko – Soviet sprint canoer who competed in the late 1970s
- Alexei Zhitnik – ice hockey defenceman; has played more games in the National Hockey League (NHL) (1,085) than any other Soviet-born defenceman
- Artem Zhmurko – skier
- Vladislav Zhovnirski – pair skating coach and former competitor
- Irina Zhuk – ice dancing coach and former competitor for the Soviet Union
- Viktor Zhurba – Soviet discus thrower
- Alexandr Zinchenko – badminton player
- Anatoli Zinchenko – Soviet footballer and coach
- Nataliya Zinchenko – football player who currently acts as manager for Zvezda Perm
- Mikhail Zubchuk – footballer
- Denis Zubko – footballer
- Olena Zubko – rower who competed for the Soviet Union in the 1976 Summer Olympics. In 1976 she was a crew member of the Soviet boat which won the silver medal in the eights event
- Igor Zuborenko – Soviet rower

=== Science ===
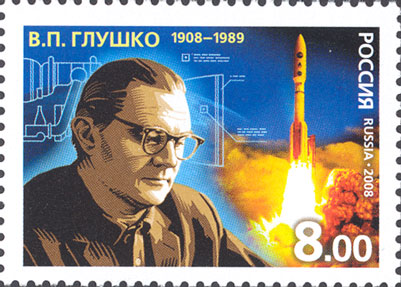
Valentin Glushko

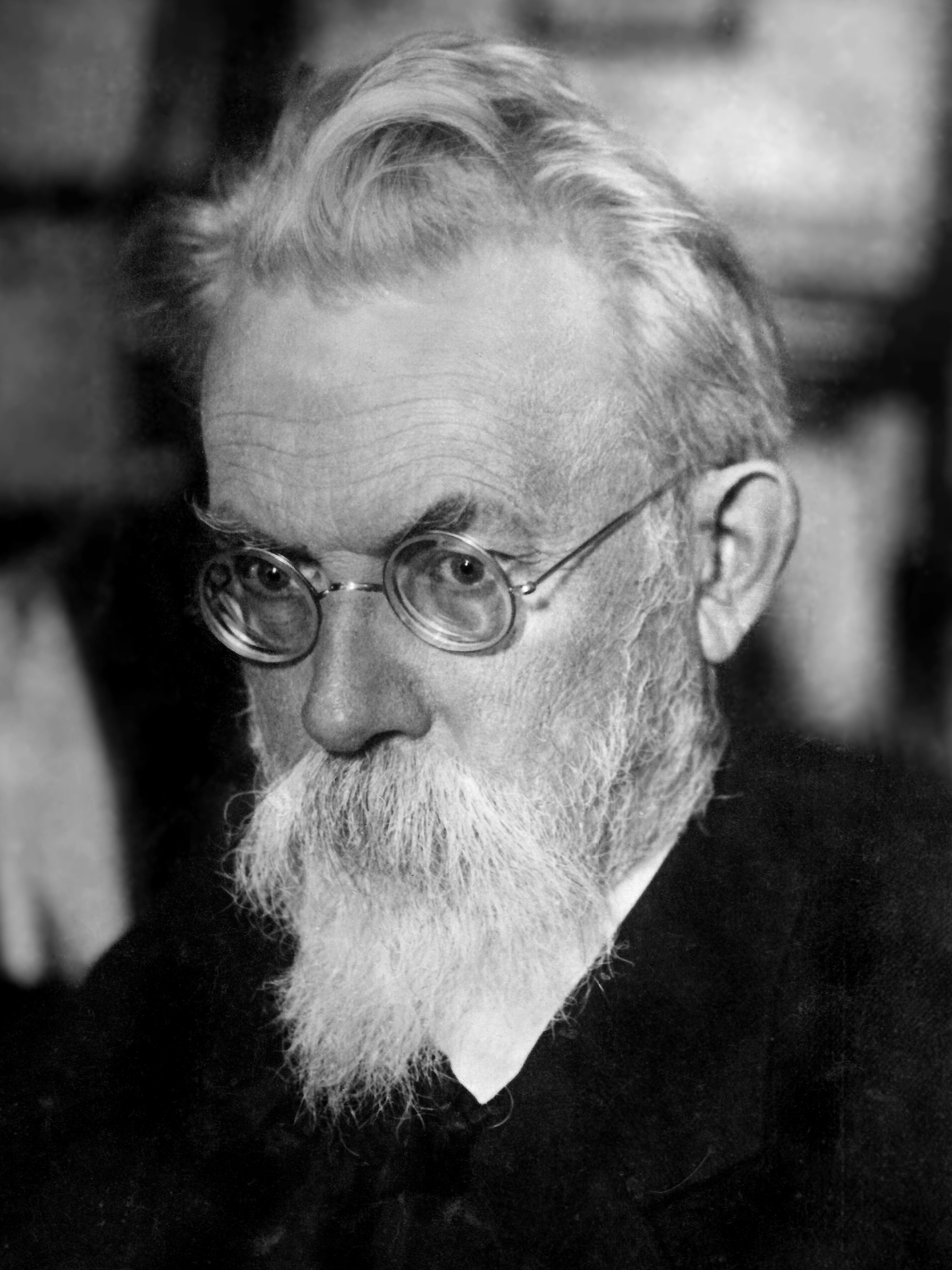
Vladimir Vernadsky

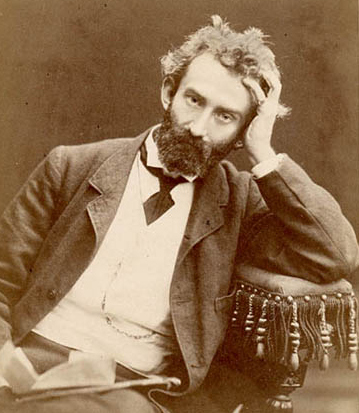
Nicholas Miklouho-Maclay

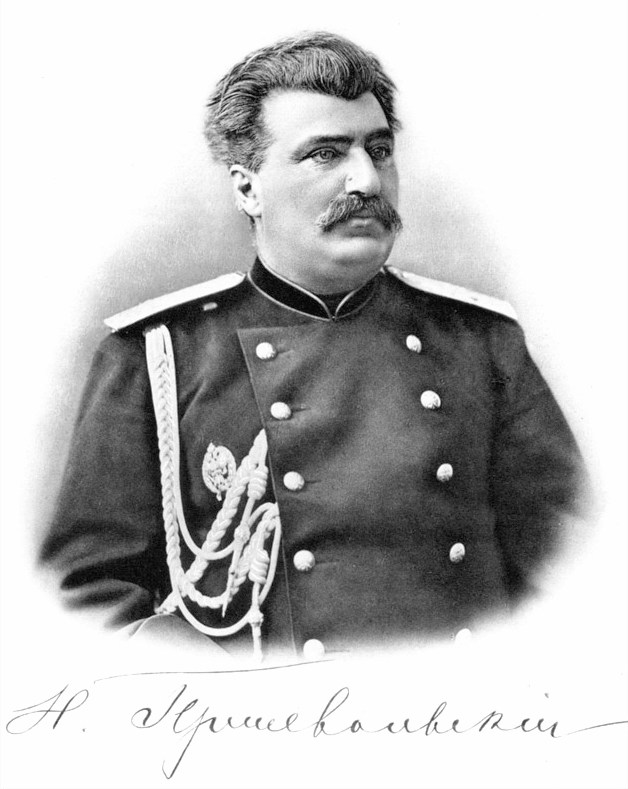
Nikolay Przhevalsky

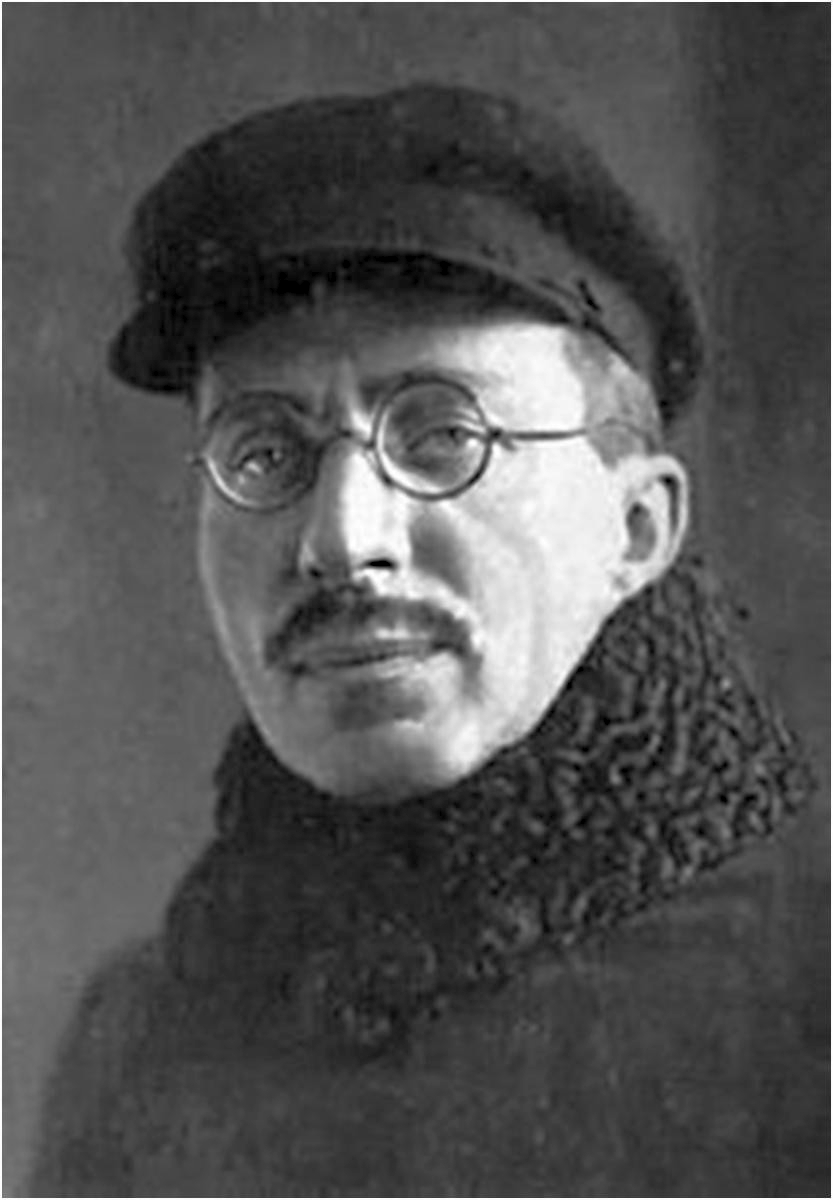
Anton Makarenko

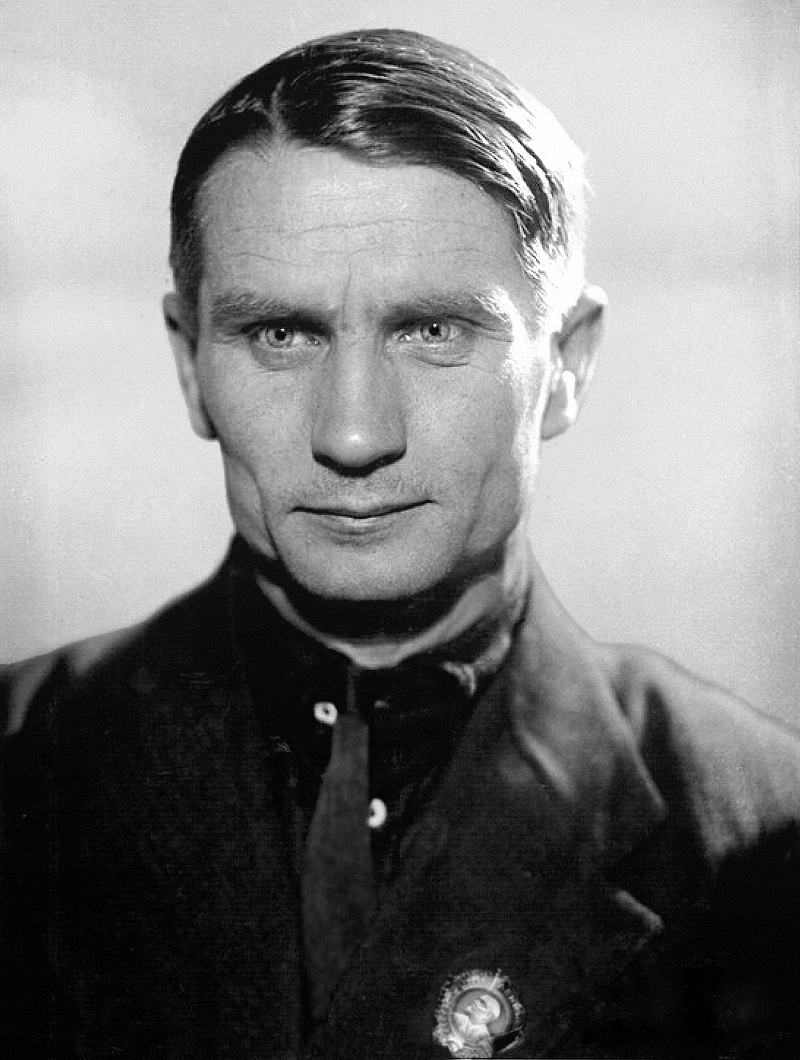
Trofim Lysenko

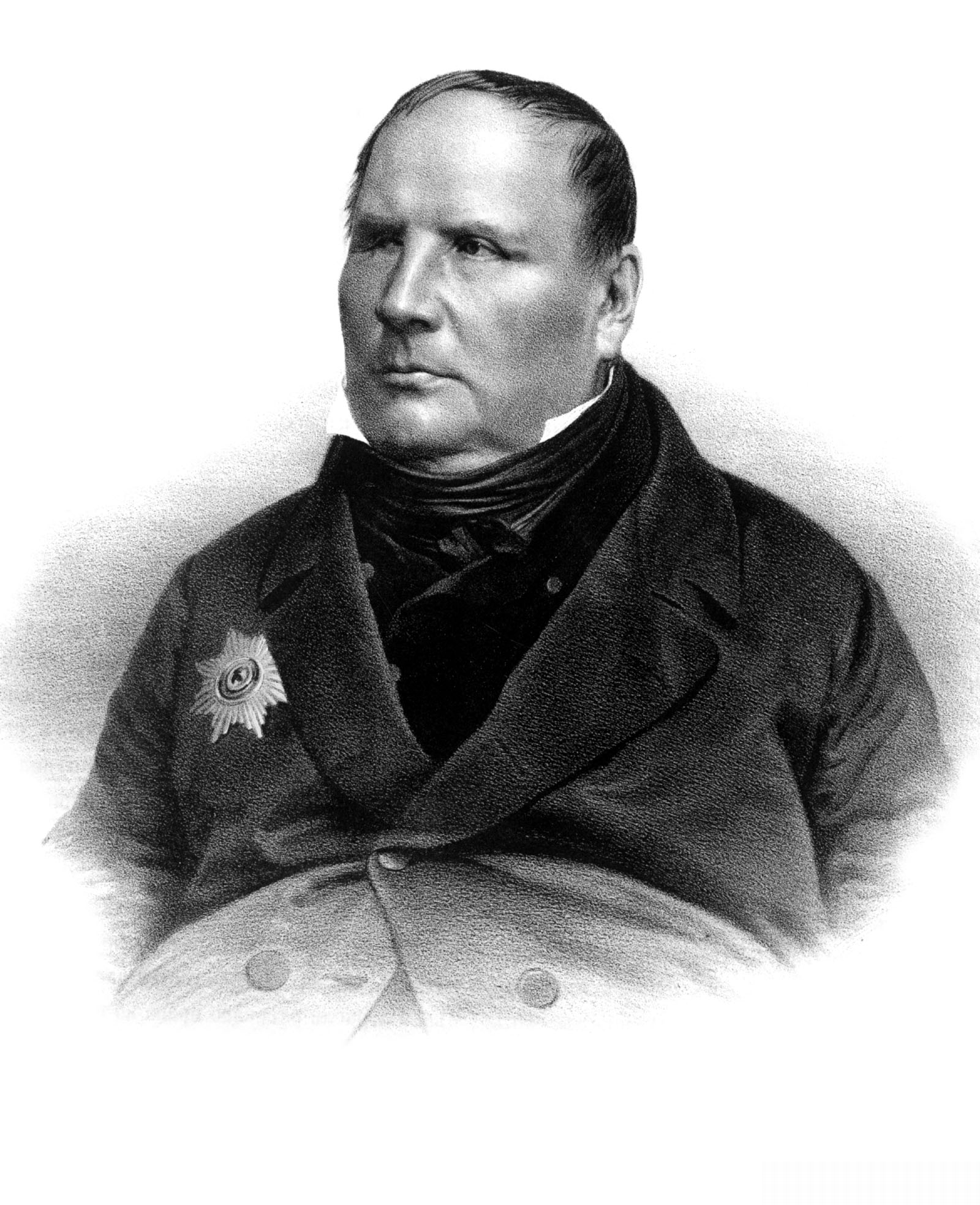
Mikhail Ostrogradsky

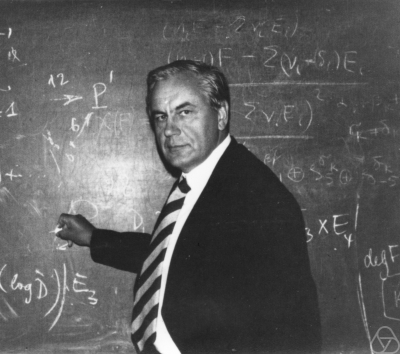
Igor Shafarevich

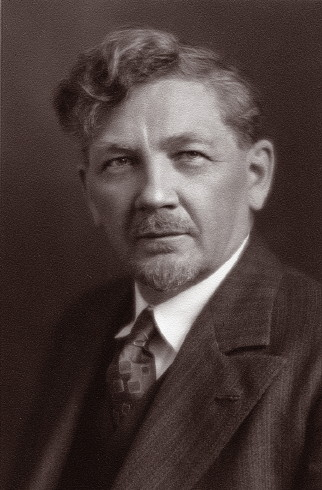
Stephen Timoshenko

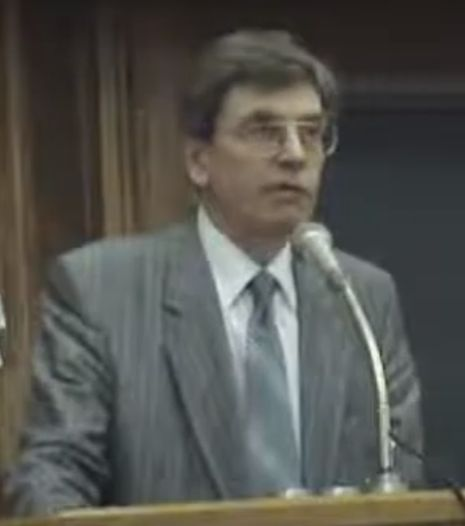
Anatoly Fomenko

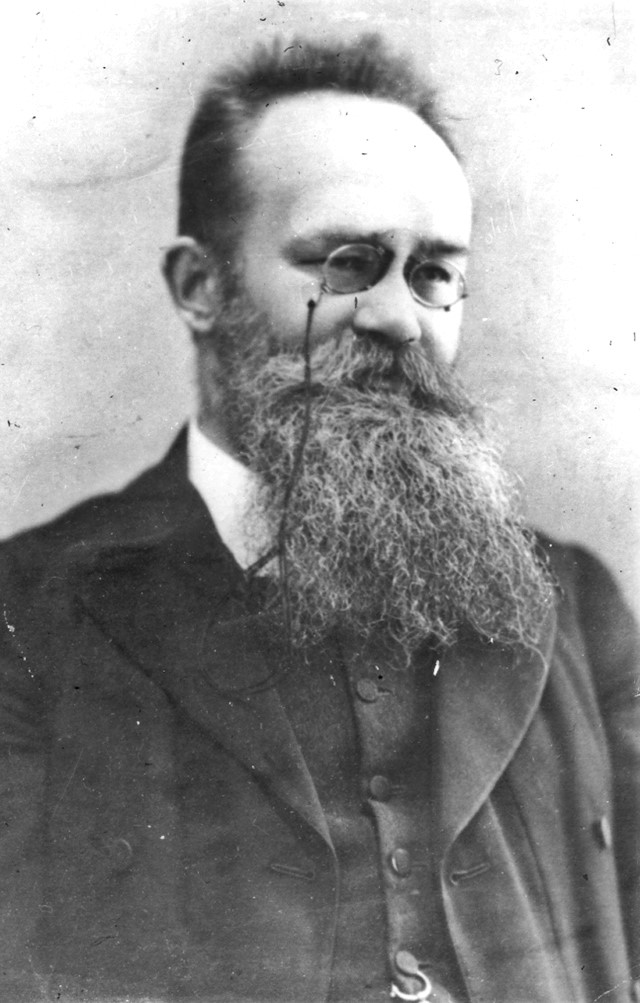
Mykhailo Hrushevsky

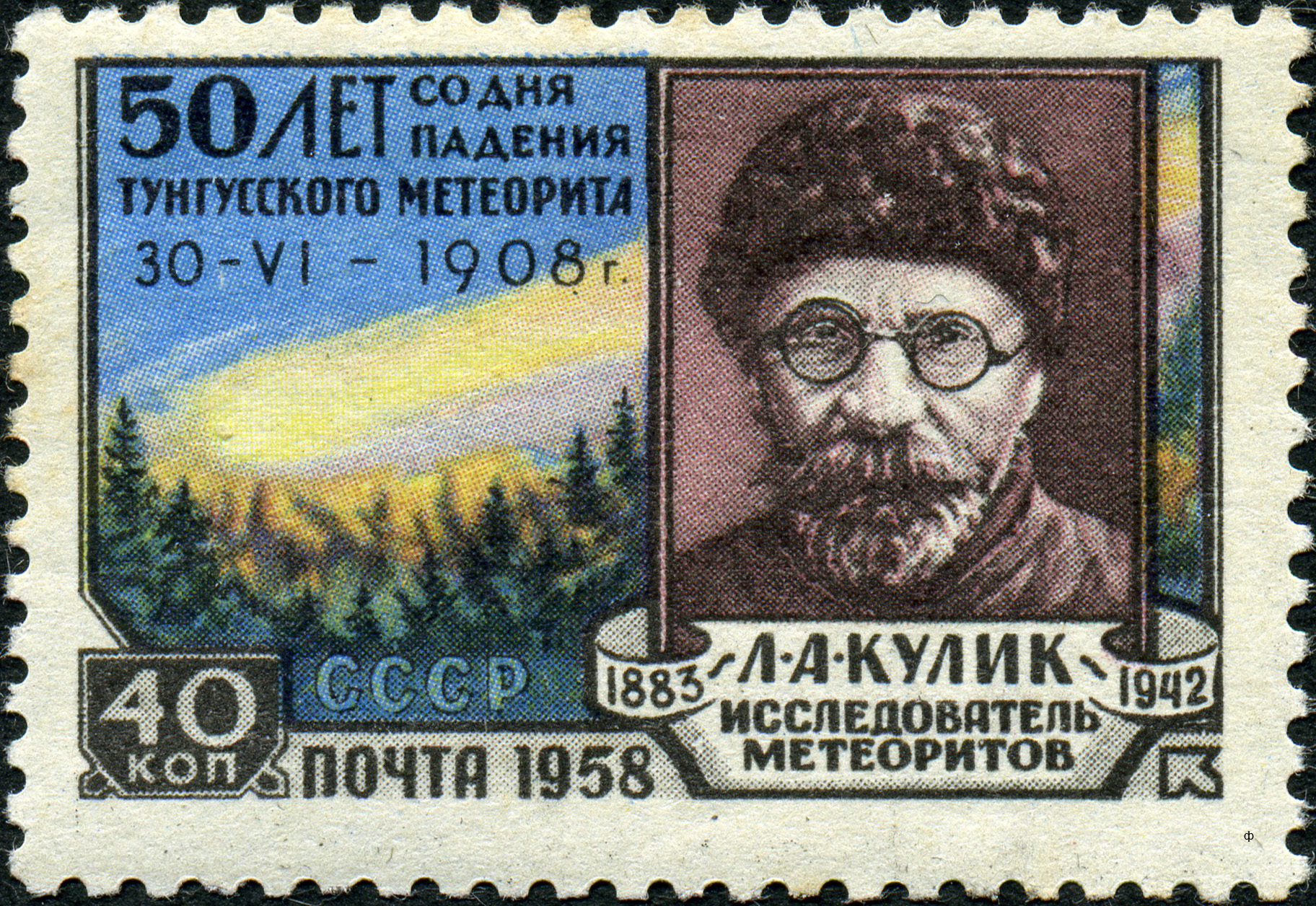
Leonid Kulik

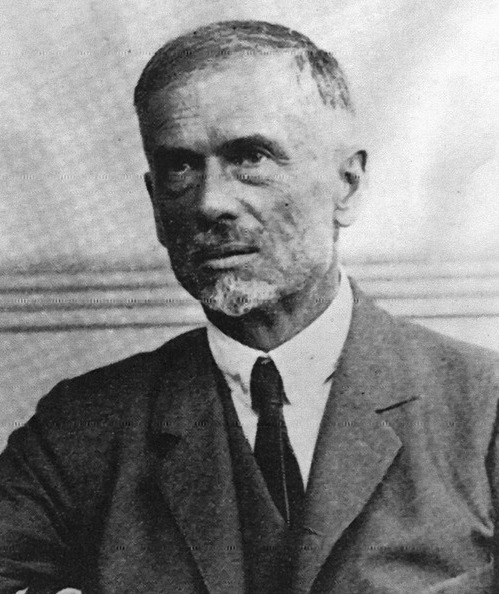
Sergei Winogradsky

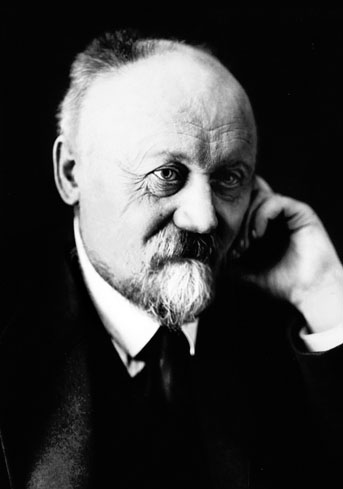
Danylo Zabolotny

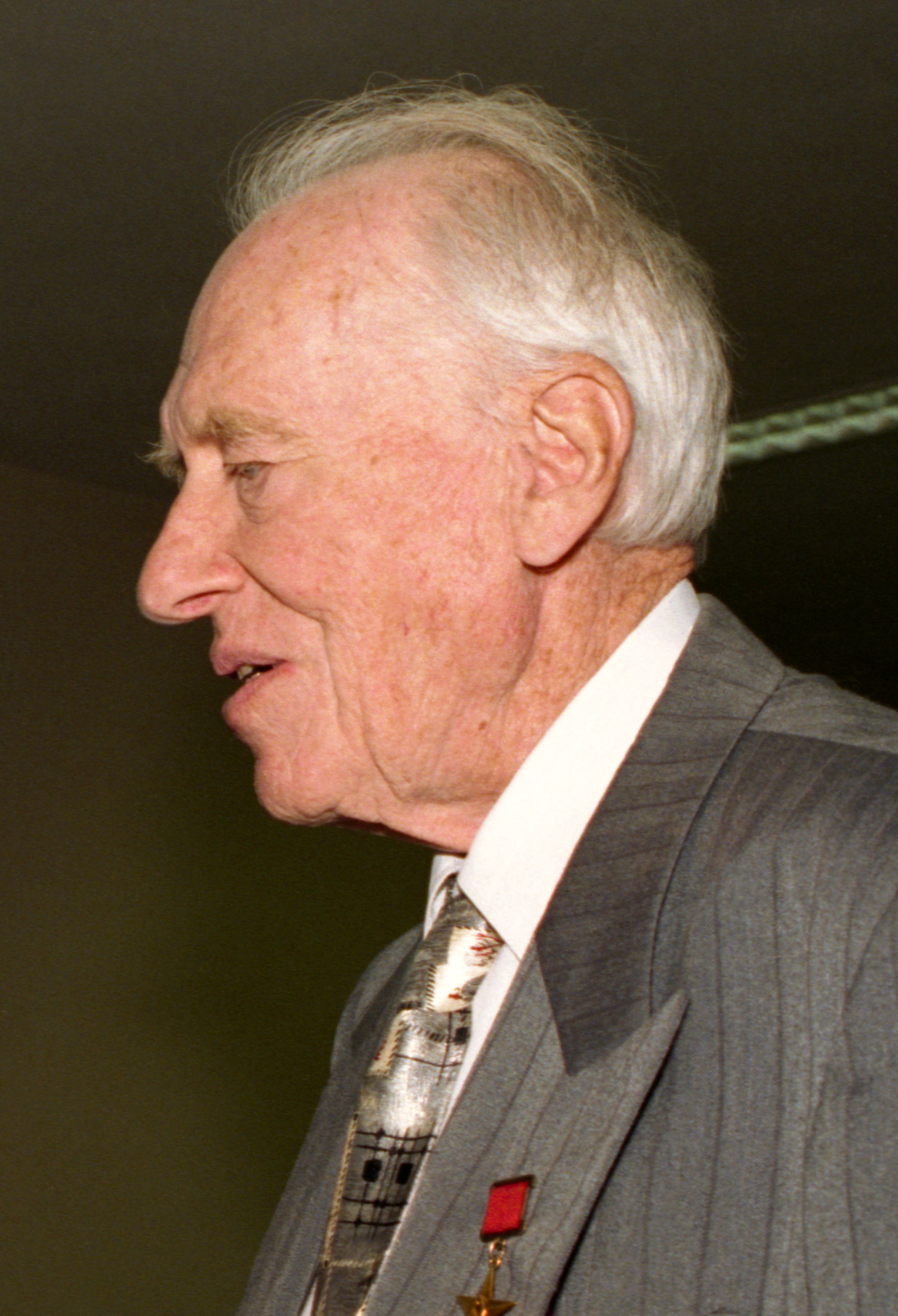
Gleb Lozino-Lozinskiy

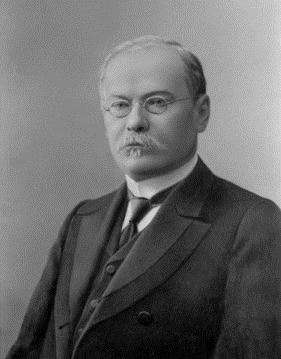
Vasily Omelianski

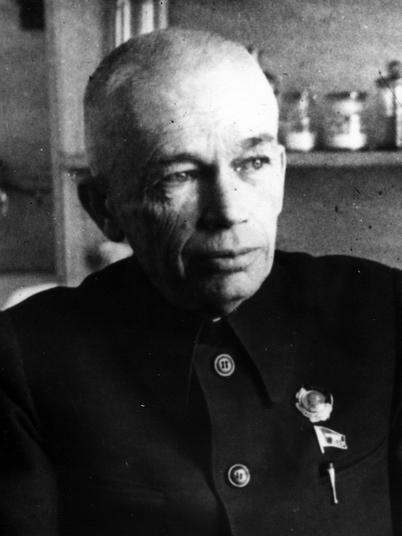
Aleksandr Bogomolets

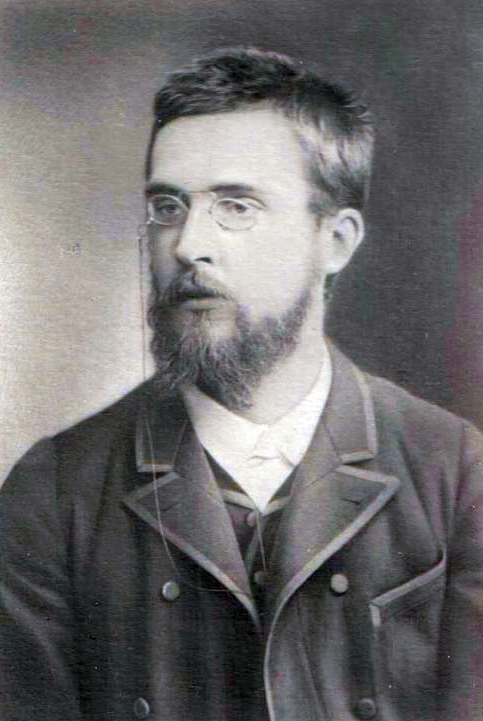
Nikolay Gamaleya

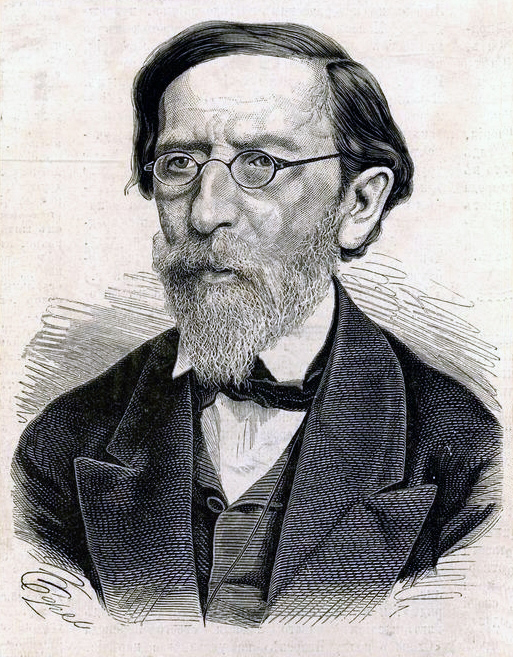
Mykhailo Maksymovych

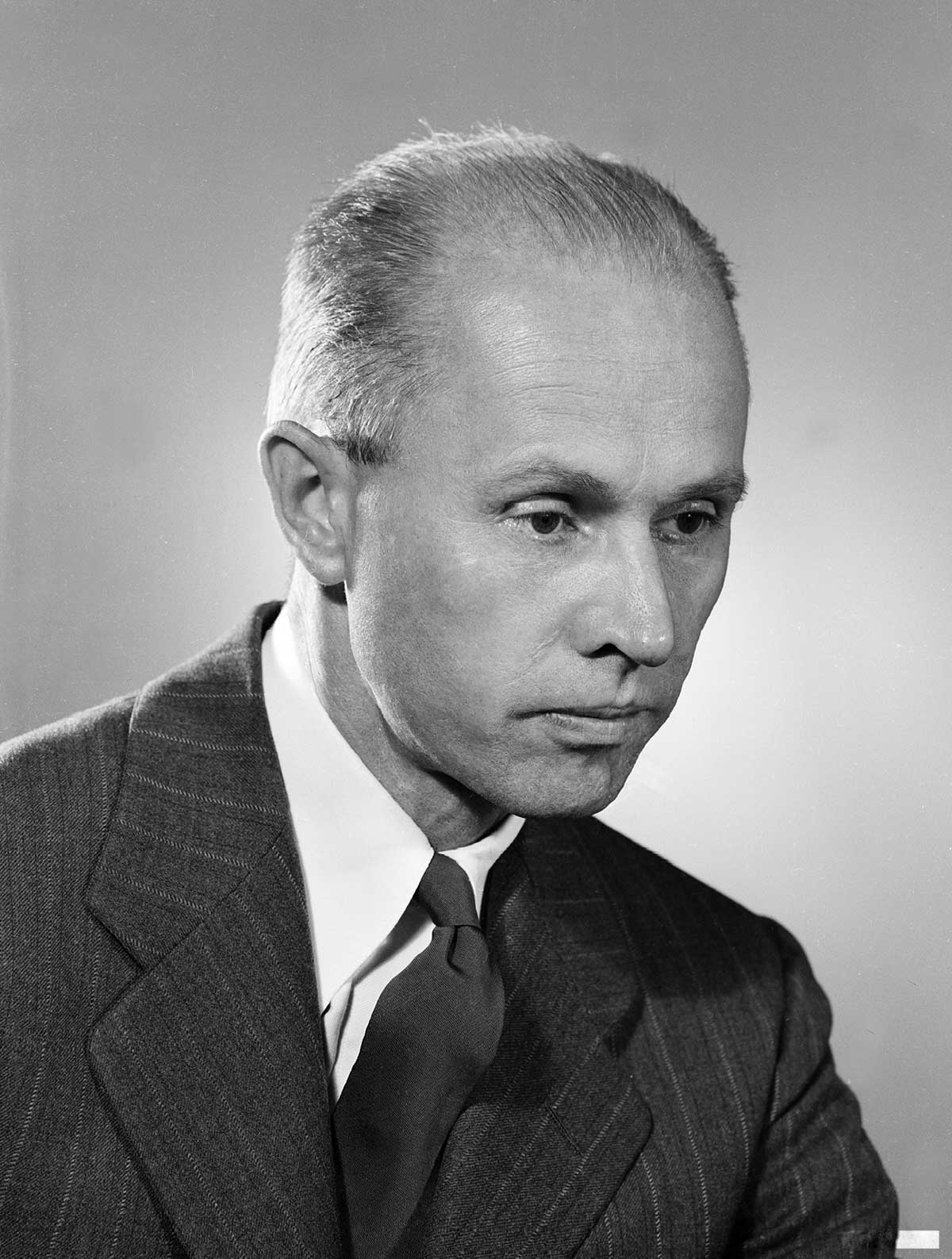
George Kistiakowsky

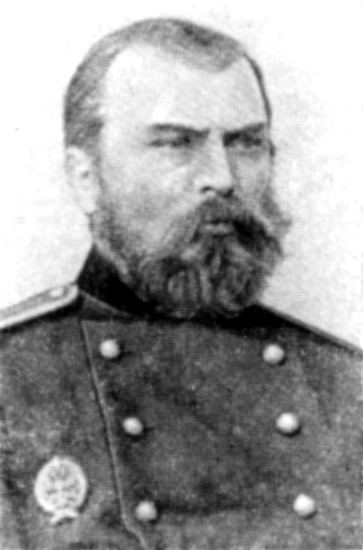
Fyodor Pirotsky

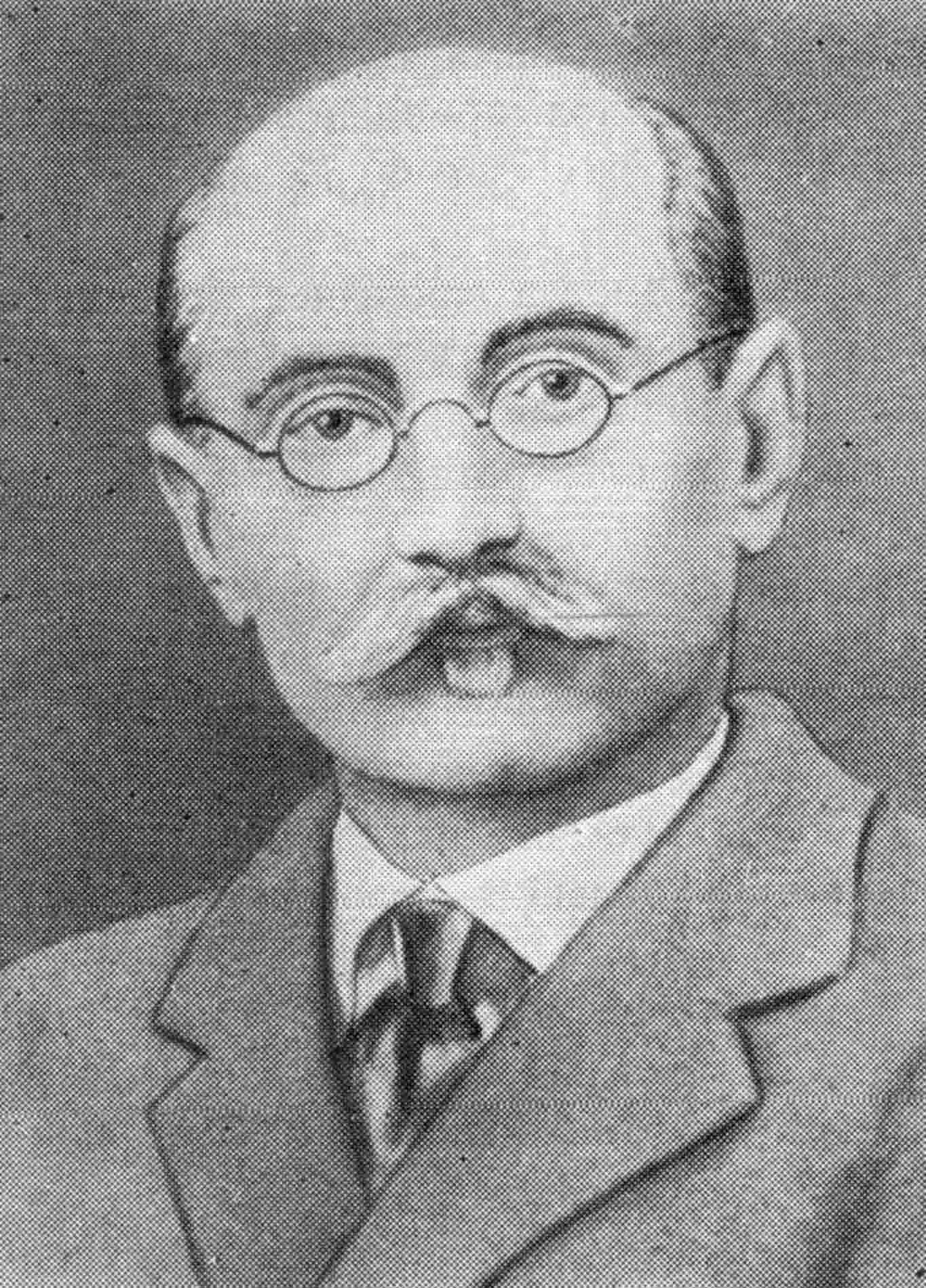
Vladimir Lipsky

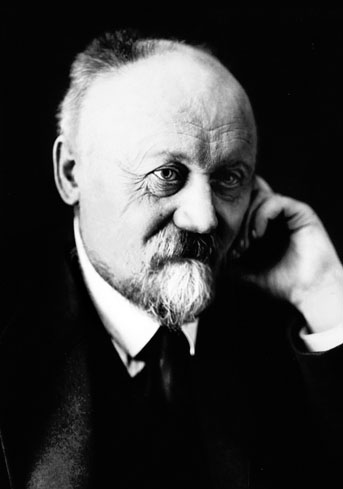
Danylo Zabolotny

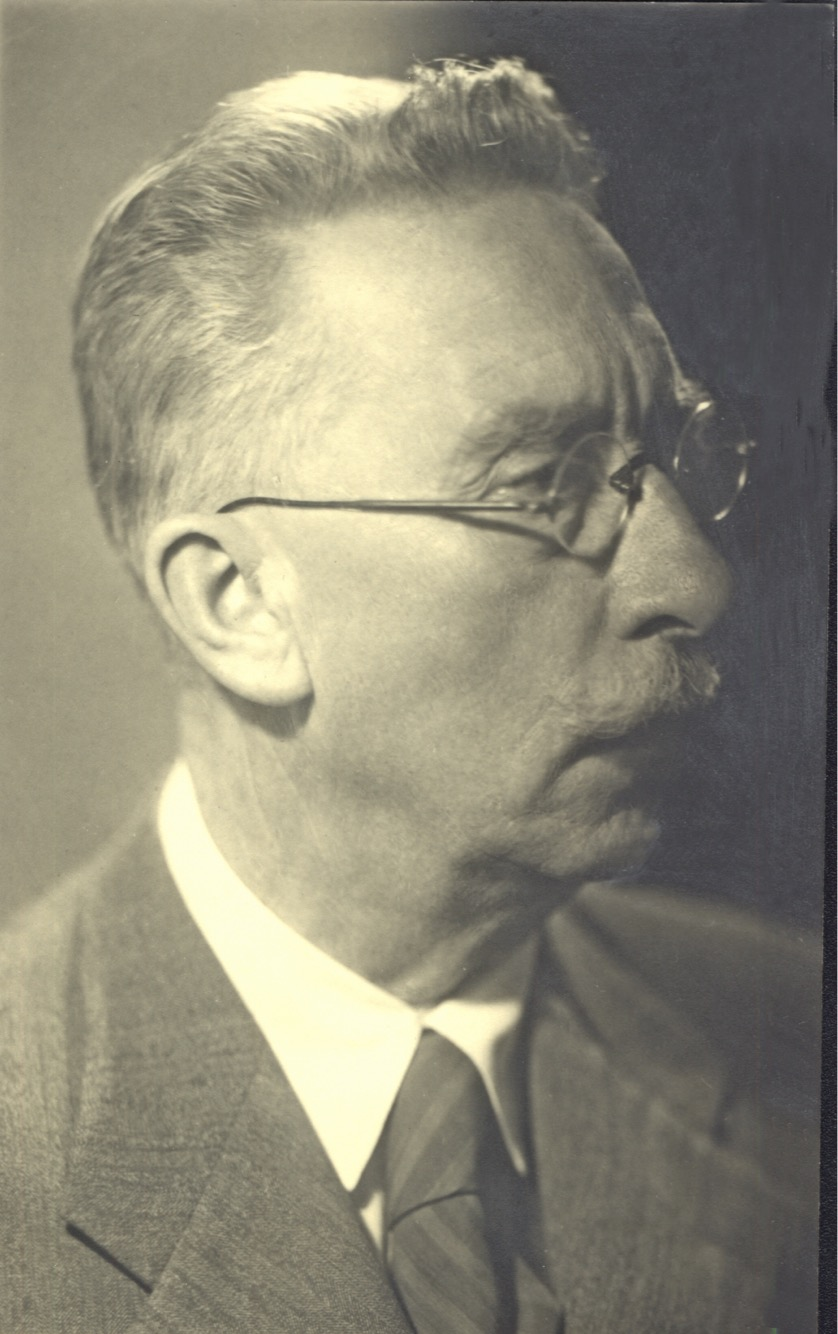
Evgenii Przhevalsky

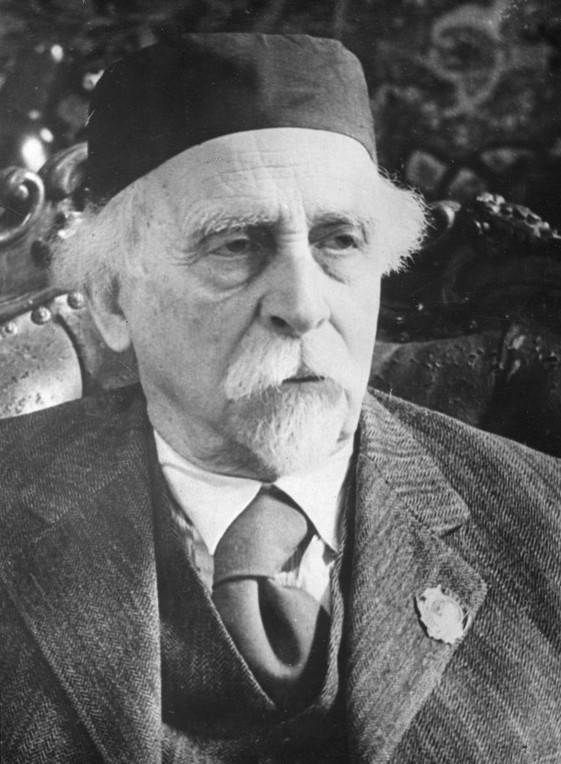
Nikolay Zelinsky

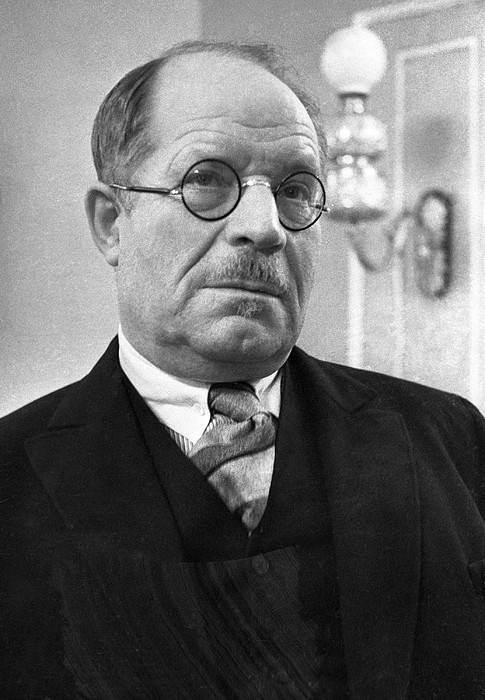
Nikolay Burdenko

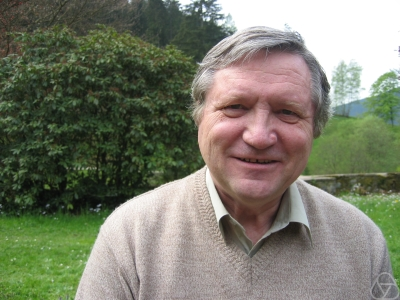
Yuri Nesterenko

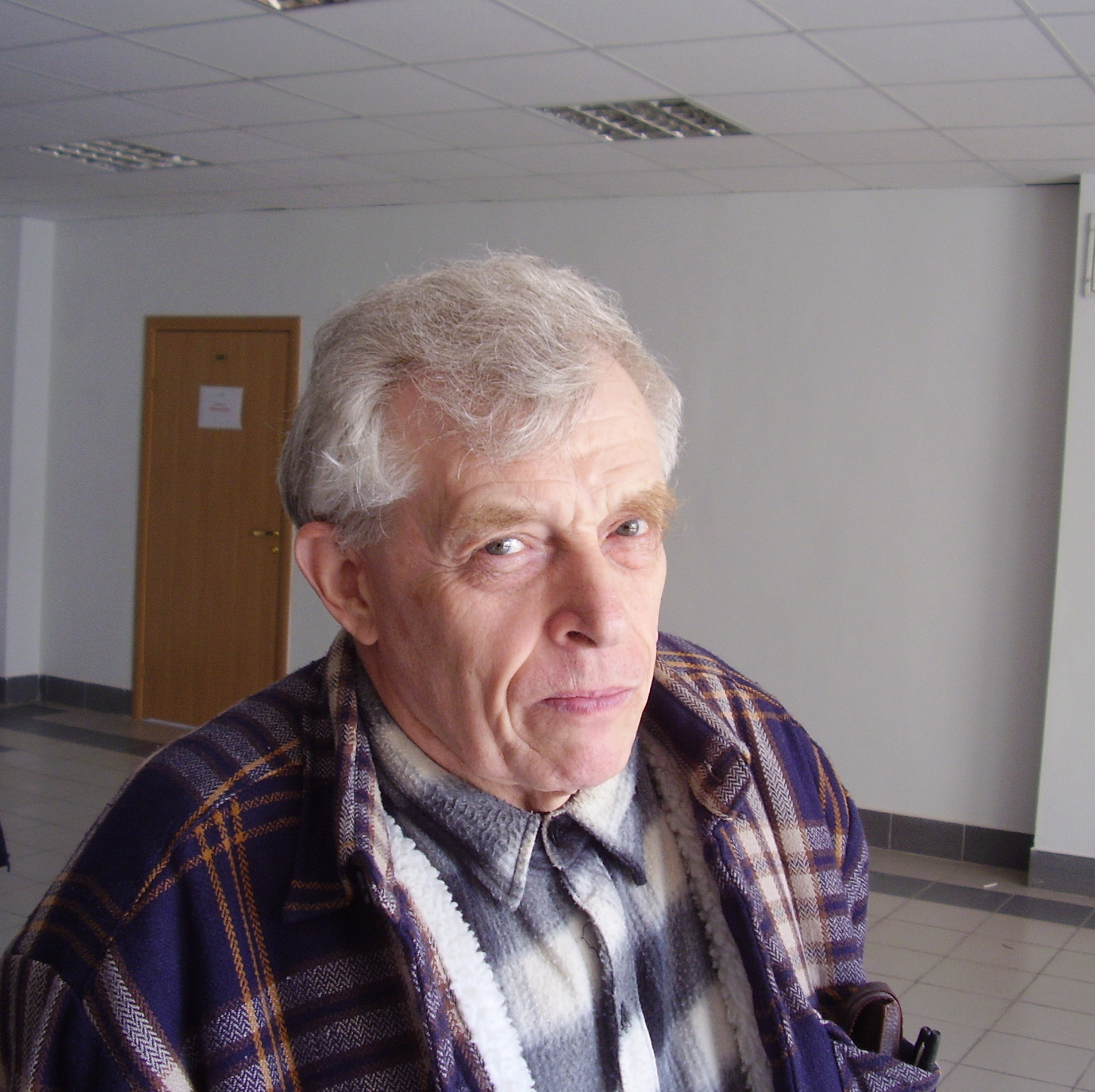
Igor Simonenko

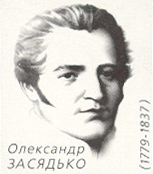
Alexander Zasyadko

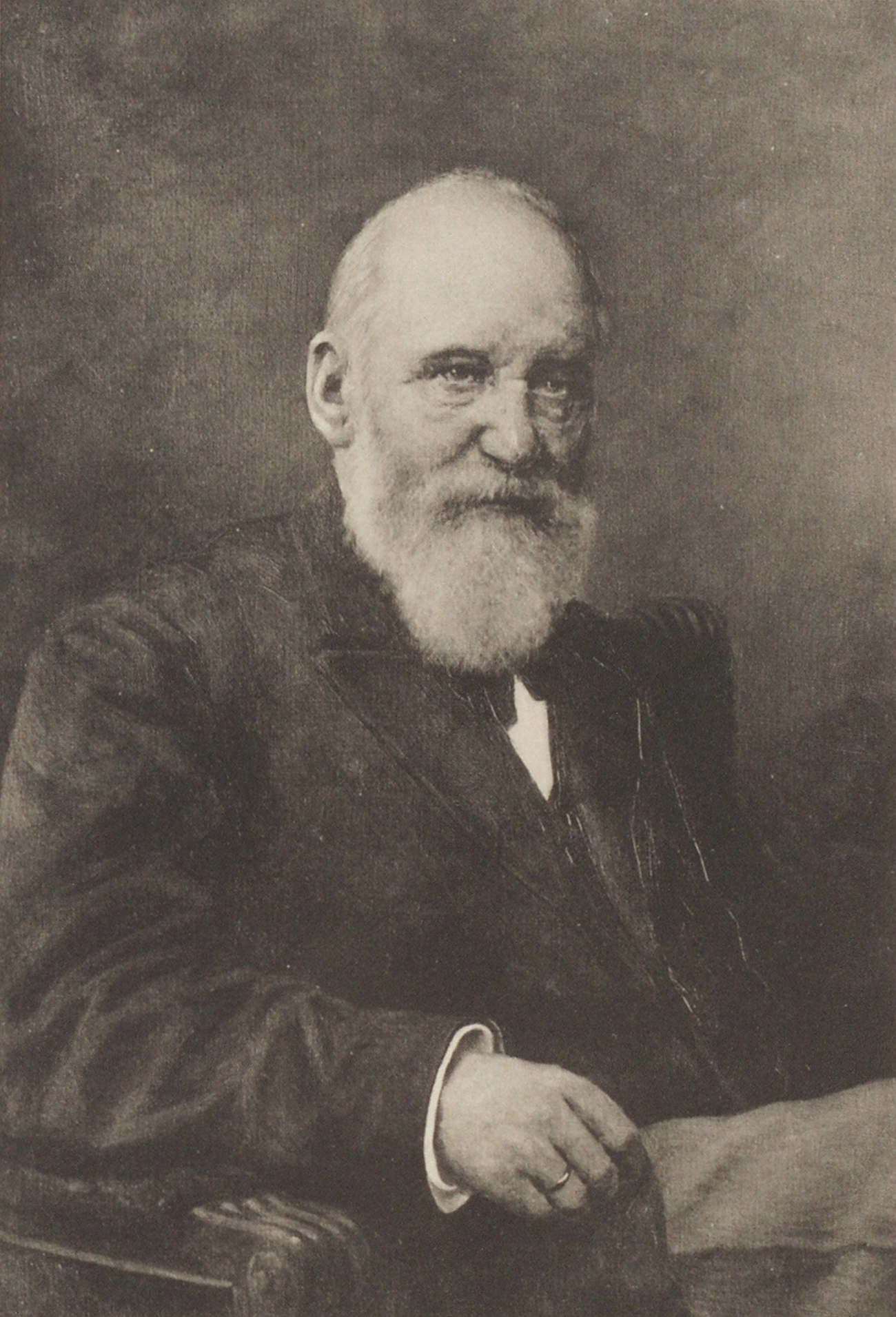
Nikolay I. Storozhenko

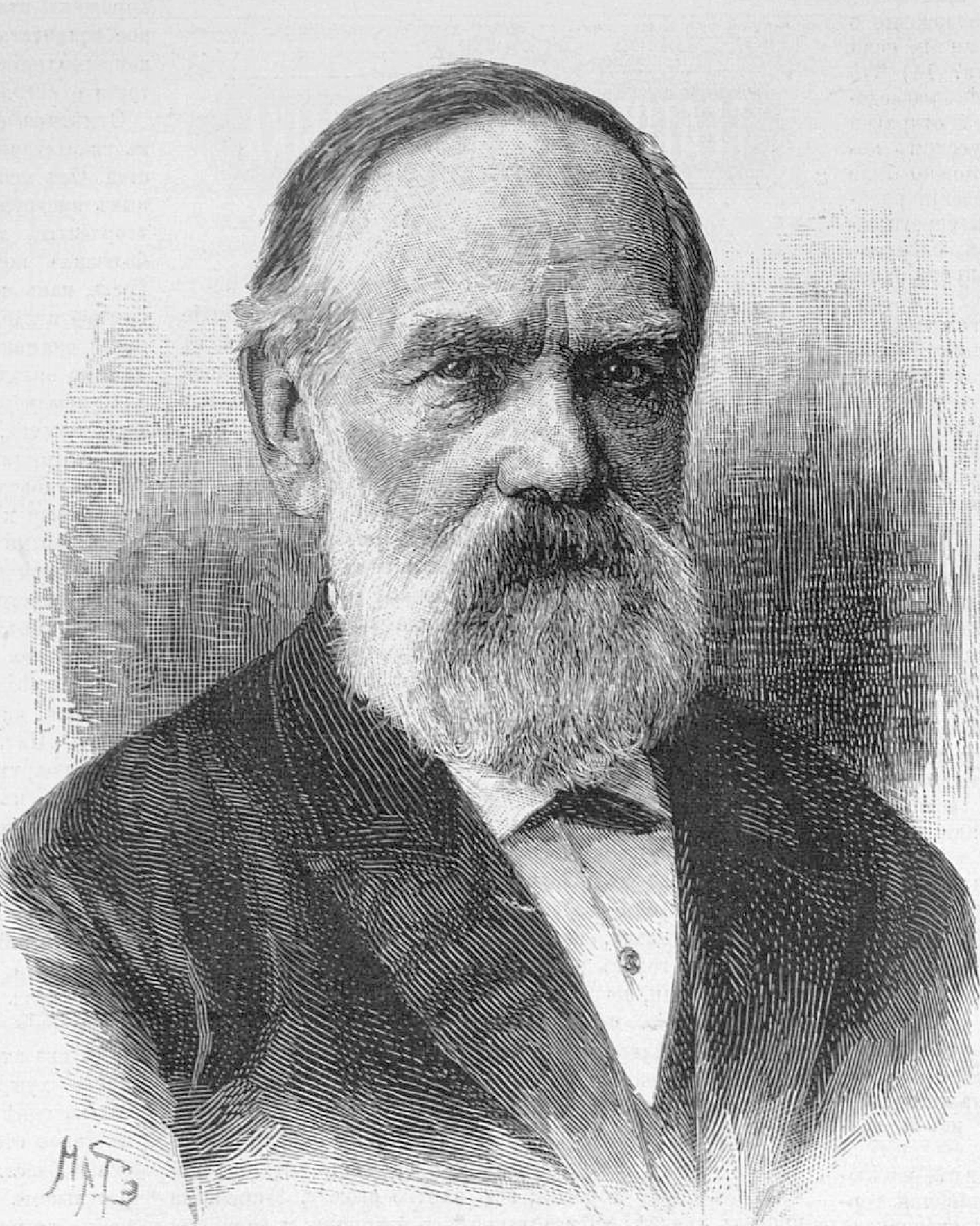
Julian Simashko

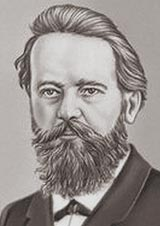
Pyotr Kashchenko

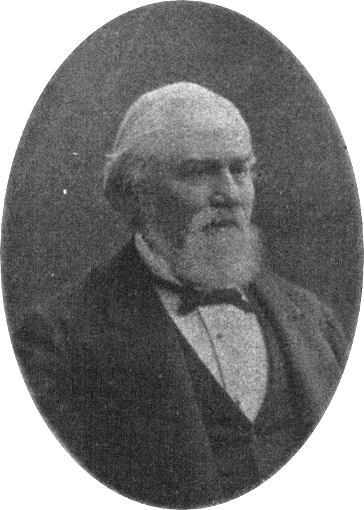
Mikhail Vaschenko-Zakharchenko

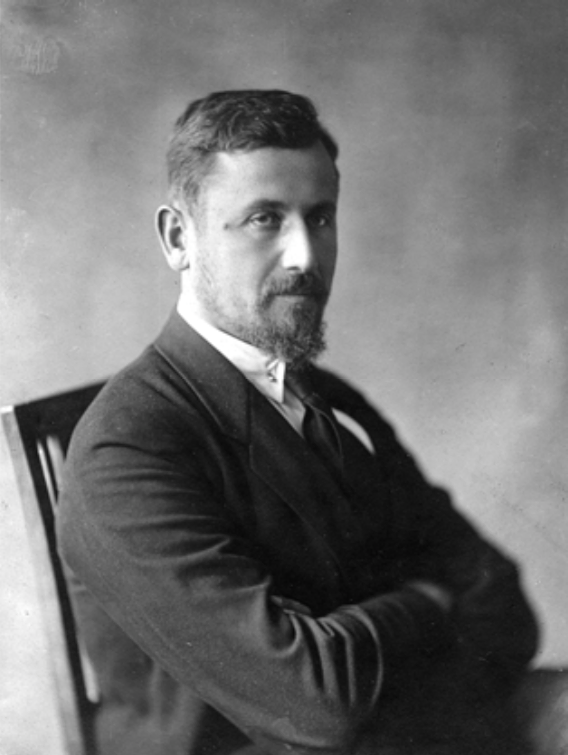
Mikhail Kravchuk

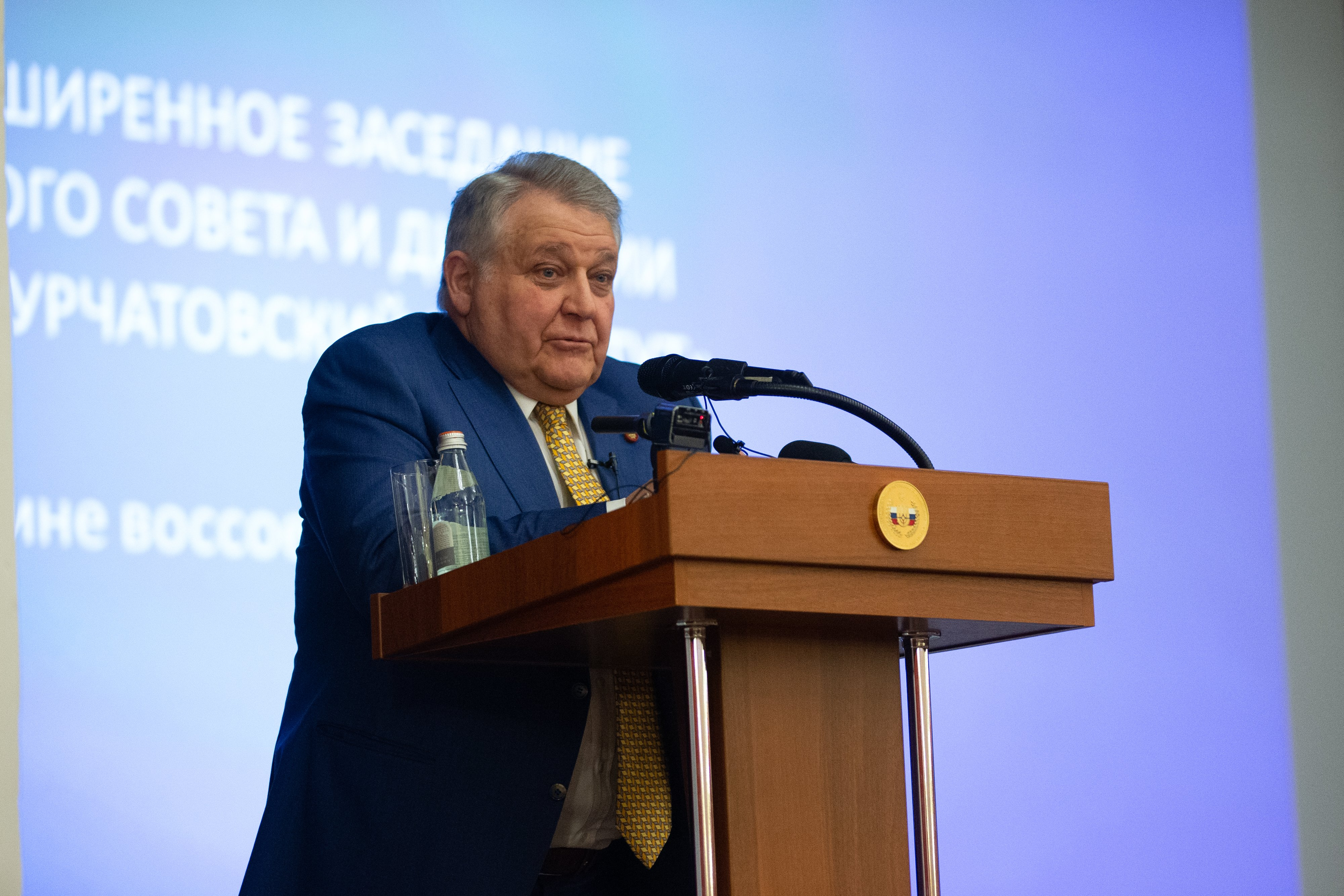
Mikhail Kovalchuk

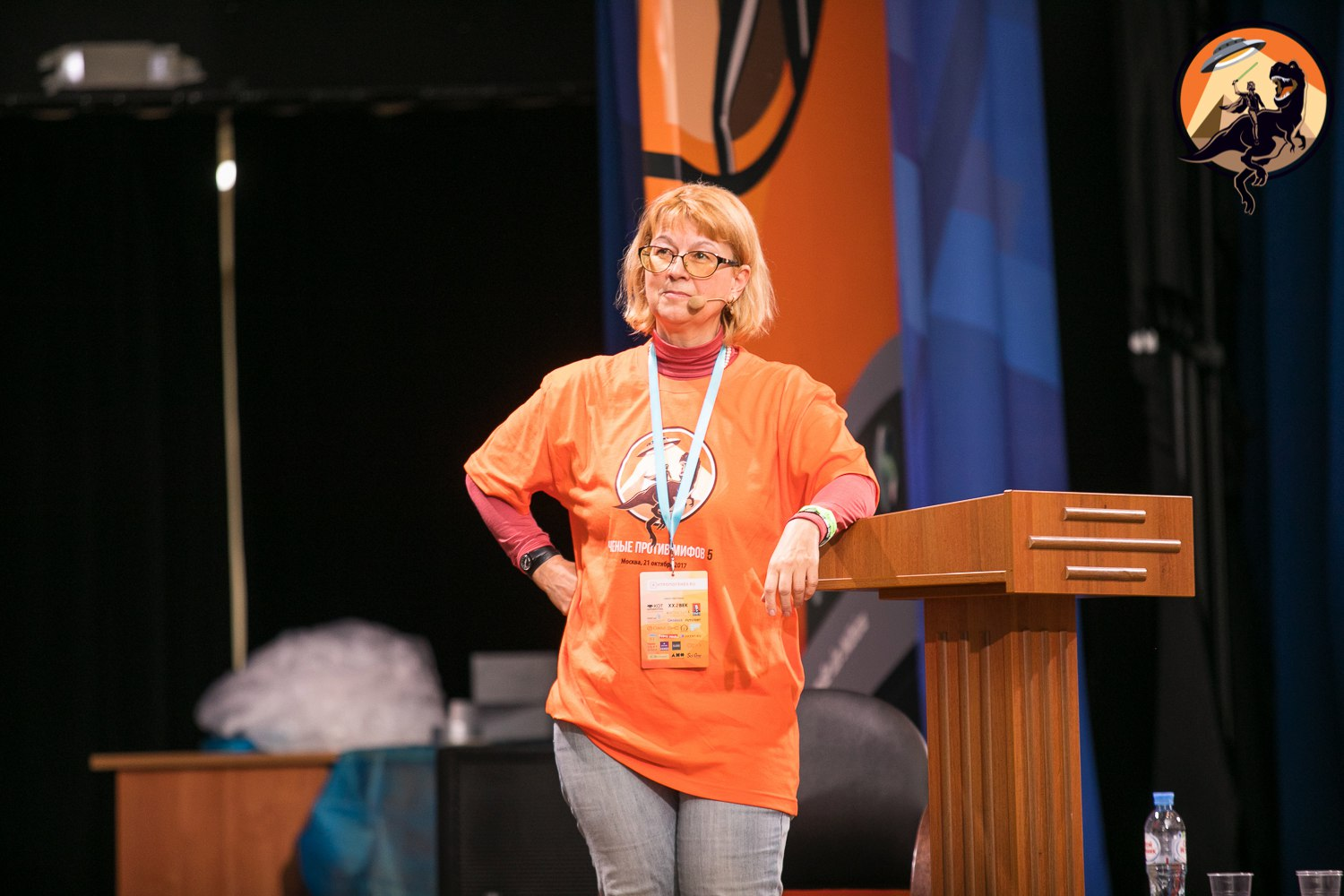
Marina Butovskaya

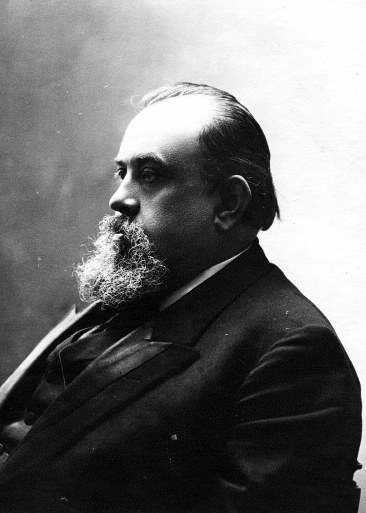
Maksim Kovalevsky

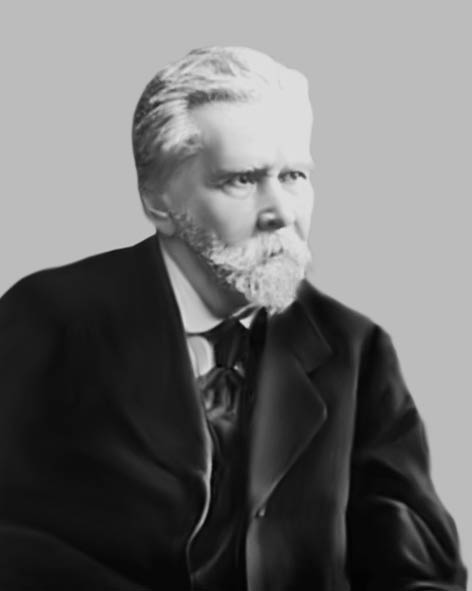
Fedir Vovk

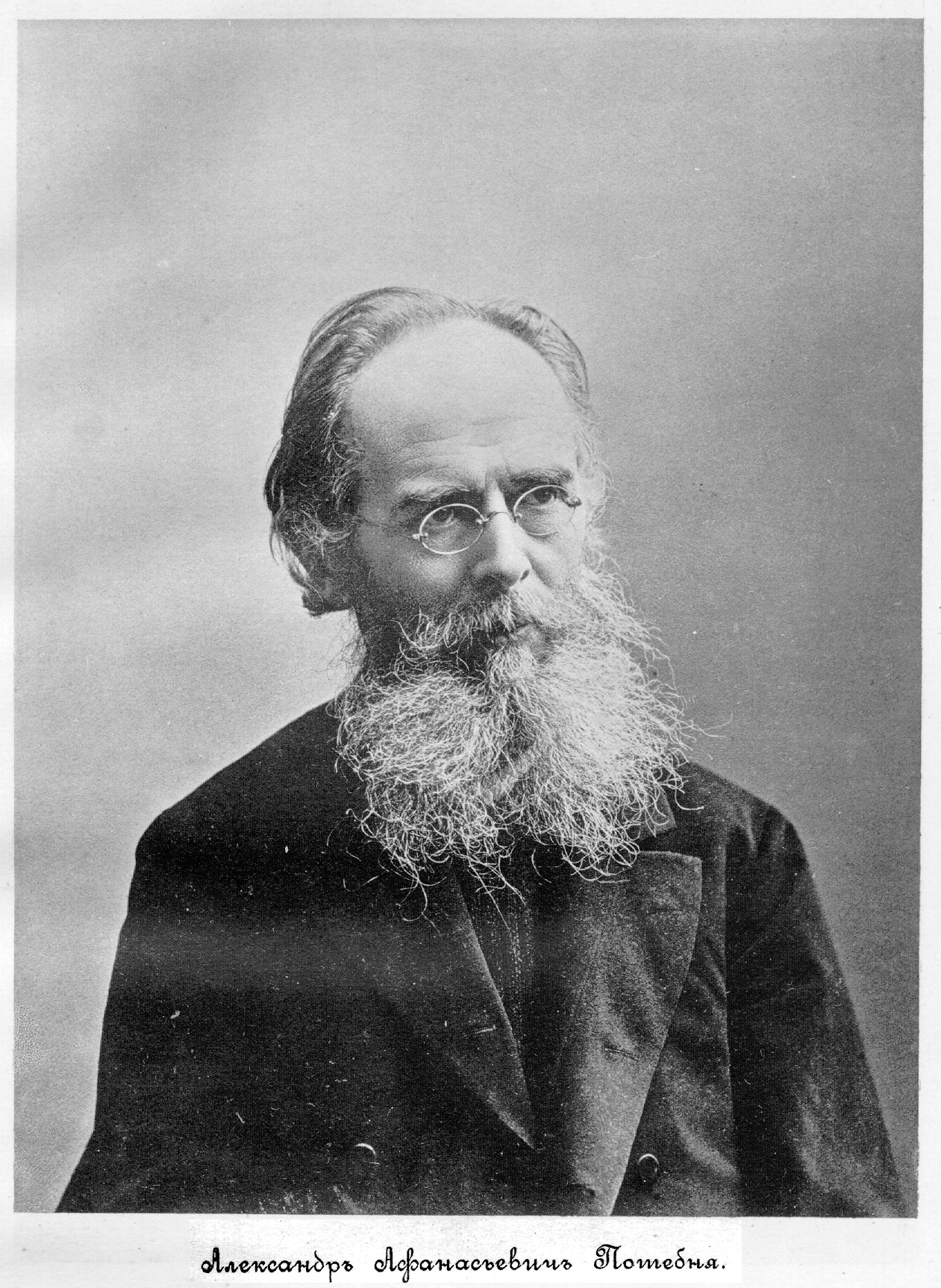
Alexander Potebnja

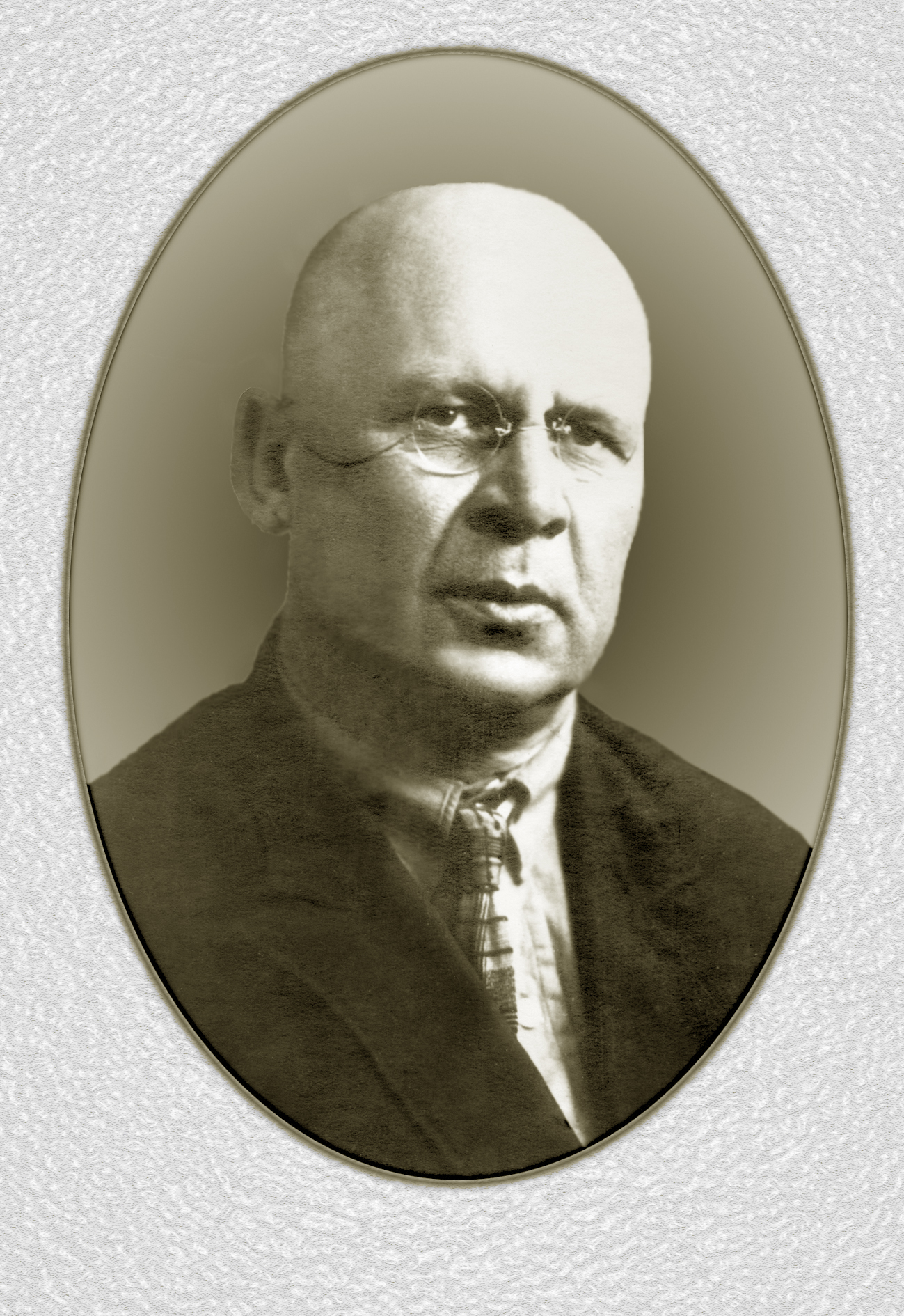
Dmitry Grigorovich

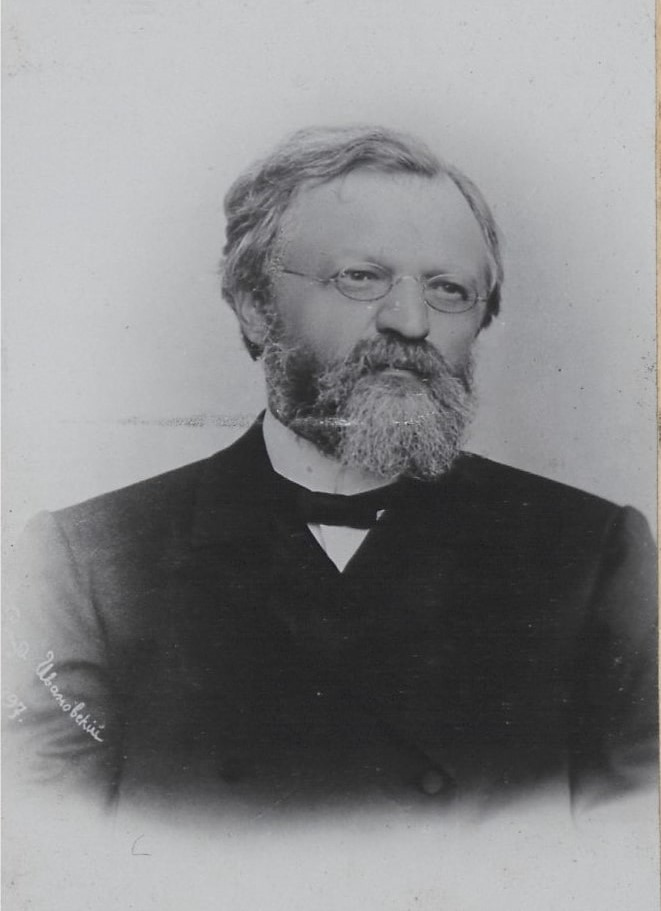
Dmitry Dubyago

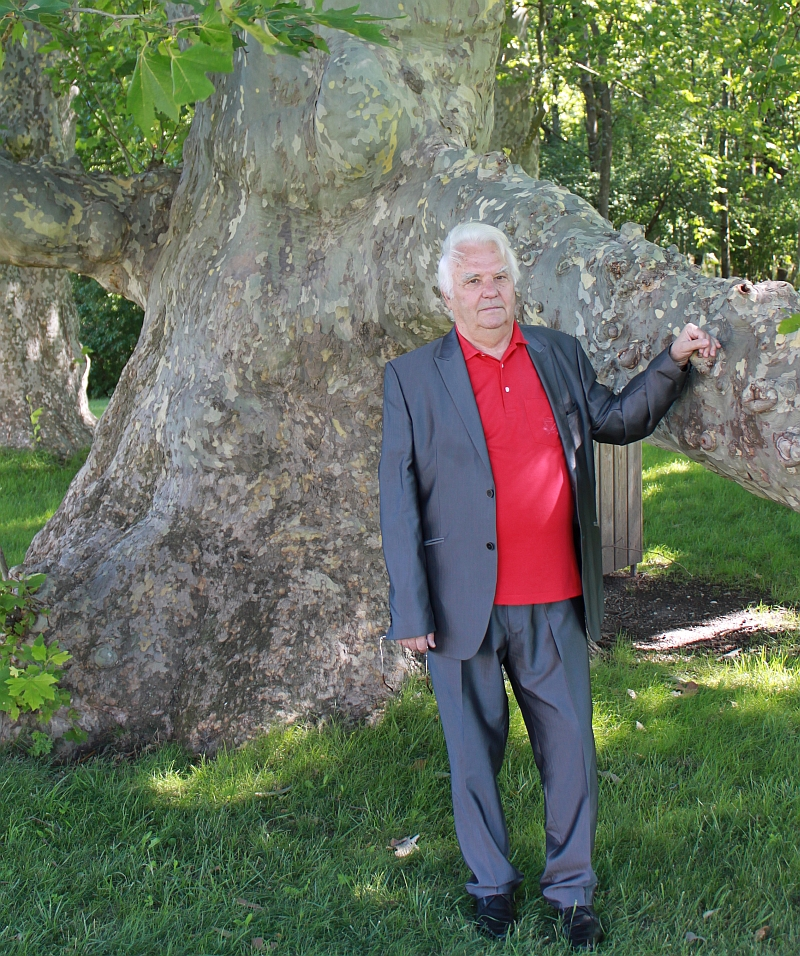
Anatoly Shvidenko

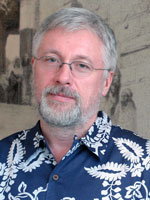
Vladimir Martynenko

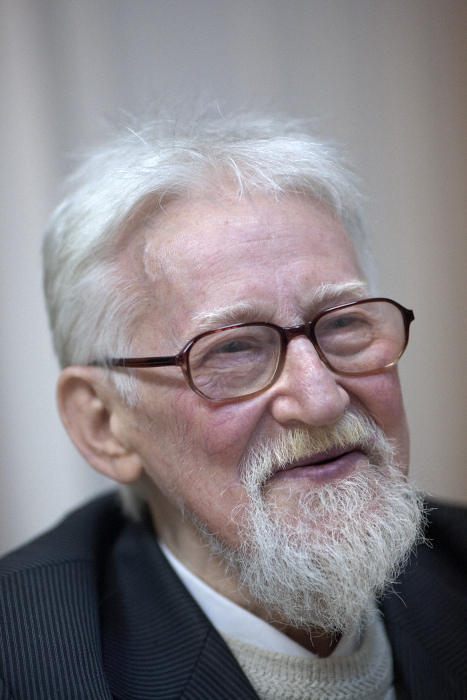
Vladimir Dybo

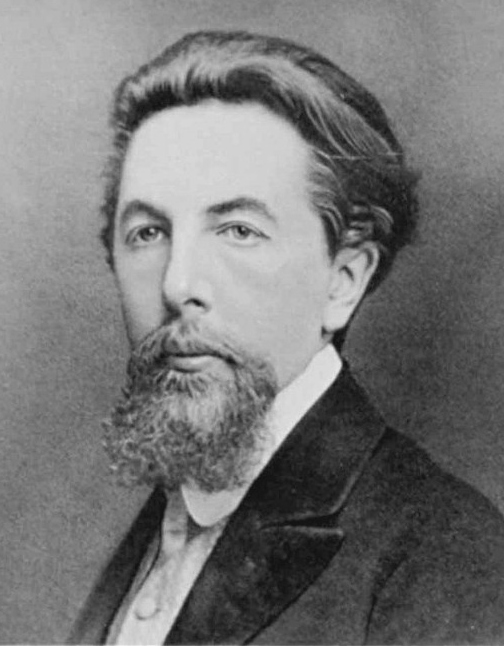
Mikhail Tsvet

- Viktor Adamsky – Soviet physicist known for his work on the former Soviet program of nuclear weapons
- Sergey Alekseenko – scientist known for his work in the fields of thermophysics and energy
- Vladimir Prokhorovich Amalitskii – paleontologist
- Artemiy Artsikhovsky – Soviet archaeologist and historian, professor (since 1937), head of the department of archaeology (since 1939) of the Moscow State University, the discoverer of birch bark manuscripts in Novgorod
- Vladimir Babeshko – physicist, former president of Kuban State University in Krasnodar, Russia
- Anatoly Babko – chemist
- Dmytro Bahalii – historian, member of the Imperial Academy of Sciences, and nine universities across the Russian Empire (1906)
- Alexander Barchenko – biologist and researcher of anomalous phenomena from St. Petersburg
- Alexander Barvinok – mathematician
- Nikolai Belelubsky – academic specialising in railway and civil engineering
- Sergei Bershadski – historian
- Vladimir Betz – anatomist and histologist, famous for the discovery of giant pyramidal neurons of primary motor cortex
- Grigory Bey-Bienko – Soviet entomologist who specialized in Orthoptera
- Dmitry Bisikalo – astrophysicist and an expert in the interaction of binary stars, member of the Russian Academy of Sciences, the IAU, acting chief of the Scientific Secretary of the Russian Academy of Sciences, chief researcher of the Institute of Astronomy of the Russian Academy of Sciences (RAS)
- Sergey Blazhko – Soviet astronomer
- Valentin Bliznyuk – aircraft designer, Chief Designer of the Tu-160
- Pavel Blonsky – Soviet psychologist, philosopher, and founder of Soviet paedology
- Osip Bodyansky – Slavist
- Alexander Bogomolets – pathophysiologist
- Dmitri Bondarenko – anthropologist and historian
- Zenon Ivanovich Borevich – mathematician
- Alexandr Boyarchuk – physicist and astronomer
- Sergei Brukhonenko – Soviet physician, biomedical scientist and technologist during the Stalinist era
- Mikhail Budyko – Soviet climatologist and one of the founders of physical climatology
- Viktor Bunyakovsky – mathematician
- Nikolay Burdenko – Soviet surgeon, the founder of Russian neurosurgery
- Leonid Burlachuk – Soviet psychologist
- Konstantin Buteyko – creator of the Buteyko method for the treatment of asthma and other breathing disorders
- Marina Butovskaya – ethologist and cultural anthropologis
- Vladimir Chelomey – mechanics scientist, aviation and missile engineer who invented the first Soviet pulse jet engine
- Maxim Chernodub – physicist best known for his postulation of the magnetic-field-induced superconductivity of the vacuum
- Alexander Chizhevsky – Soviet-era interdisciplinary scientist, biophysicist who founded "heliobiology" (study of the Sun's effect on biology) and "aero-ionization" (study of effect of ionization of air on biological entities)
- Leonard Chodźko – historian, geographer, cartographer, publisher, archivist
- Nikolai Cholodny – Soviet microbiologist
- Pavel Chubinsky – ethnographer and geographer
- Vasily Danilewsky – physician, physiologist and parasitologist
- Viktor Davidenko – Soviet engineer in the Soviet program of nuclear weapons, working mainly on military nuclear reactors for fissile materials
- Denis Denisenko – astronomer
- Yuri Denisyuk – Soviet physicist, one of the founders of optical holography. He is known for his great contribution to holography, in particular for the so-called "Denisyuk hologram"
- Anatoly Derevyanko – Soviet and Russian archaeologist who specializes in the Stone Age of Siberia and the Russian Far East
- Nikolay Dikansky – physicist
- Evgeny Dobrenko – historian
- Nadiya Dobrovolska-Zavadska – researcher, surgeon and geneticist
- Theodosius Dobzhansky – geneticist and evolutionary biologist
- Alexander Dovzhenko – Soviet psychiatrist
- Dmitry Dubyago – astronomer and expert in theoretical astrophysics, astrometry, and gravimetry
- Alexander Dubyago – astronomer and expert in theoretical astrophysics, astrometry, and gravimetry
- Konstantin Dushenko – historian
- Anna Dybo – linguist who specializes in the Altaic languages
- Vladimir Dybo – specialist in comparative historical linguistics and accentology
- Maria Emelianenko – applied mathematician and materials scientist known for her work in numerical algorithms, scientific computing, grain growth, and centroidal Voronoi tessellations
- Oktyabrʹ Emelʹyanenko – Soviet physicist, Ph.D. in Physics and Mathematical Sciences
- Alexei Fedchenko – explorer and naturalist
- Nikolay Fedorenko – economist and chemist
- Nikolai Fedorenko – Soviet philologist, orientalist, statesman, public figure, professor (1953), and corresponding member of the Soviet Academy of Sciences (1958)
- Mikhail Fedoruk – rector of Novosibirsk State University, Doctor of Physics and Mathematics
- Boris Fedtschenko – phytopathologist and botanist
- Ivan Fesenko – mathematician working in number theory and its interaction with other areas of modern mathematics
- Yuri Filipchenko – entomologist
- Anatoly Fomenko – mathematician, topologist, the author of a pseudoscientific theory known as New Chronology
- Nikolay Gamaleya – Soviet physician and scientist who played a pioneering role in microbiology and vaccine research
- Alexander Gavrilenko – cardiac surgeon, corresponding member of the USSR Academy of Medical Sciences since 2004, and a full member (academician) of the Russian Academy of Sciences since 2016
- Oleg Gazenko – scientist, general officer in the Soviet Air Force and the former director of the Institute of Biomedical Problems in Moscow
- Nikolai Girenko – Russian ethnologist
- Valery Glivenko – mathematician
- Valentin Glushko – rocket scientist, a pioneer in rocket propulsion systems, and a major contributor to Soviet space and defense technology
- Valery Godyak – physicist who specializes in plasma physics
- Alexander Gorban – physicist and biologist
- Sergey Govorushko – scientist who was laureate of the 2012 Grigoriev Prize of the Russian Academy of Science
- Boris Grabovsky – one of the pioneers of television, invented the first fully electronic TV set (video transmitting tube and video receiver), which was demonstrated in 1928
- Rostislav Grigorchuk – mathematician working in different areas of mathematics including group theory, dynamical systems, geometry and computer science
- Elena Grigorenko – clinical psychologist
- Dmitry Grigorovich – Soviet aircraft designer
- Victor Grigorovich – Slavist, folklorist, literary critic, historian and journalist, one of the originators of Slavic studies in the Russian Empire
- Ippolit S. Gromeka – 19th century Russian scientist who made significant contributions to the science of fluid mechanics
- Anatoly Gromyko – member of the Russian Academy of Sciences
- Mikhail Grushevsky – historian
- Aleksey Pavlovitch Hansky – astronomer
- Oleksandr Harmash – Soviet scientist in the field of production line methods in construction (construction engineering)
- Yakub Holovatsky – historian
- Yulij Ilyashenko – mathematician
- Mikhail Ivakhnenko – paleontologist
- Dmitri Ivanenko – theoretical physicist
- Arthur Jaczewski – biologist who was involved in studies on plant pathogenic fungi (particularly rusts and mildews) and was involved in the application of phytopathology to agronomy
- Józefa Joteyko – physiologist, psychologist, pedagogue, and researcher
- Anatoli Kapustinskii – Soviet chemist
- Georgii Karpechenko – biologist
- Boris Karvasarsky – psychiatrist
- Pyotr Kashchenko – psychiatrist, social and agrarian activist, author of articles on mental health and mental health services
- Anatoly Kashpirovsky – psychotherapist, claimed to be a hypnotist and a psychic healer
- Oleg Khlevniuk – historian
- Boris Kholodenko – biologist
- Nikolai Kibalchich – rocket pioneer
- Evgenia Kirichenko – historian of architecture and art
- George Kistiakowsky – physical chemistry professor
- Alexander Kistiakowsky – ornithologist and a specialist on bird lice
- Bogdan Kistyakovski – philosopher and social scientist
- Yuri Kivshar – physicist
- David Klyshko – physicist and professor, highly regarded Physics professor at Moscow State University, was known for his imperative approach for Quantum Optics understanding
- Leonid Kolotilo – Soviet geographer, researcher of Lake Baikal, a full member of Academic Senate Russian Geographical Society
- Anatoly Kondratenko – theoretical physicist
- Caesar Korolenko – psychiatrist
- Sergei Korzhinsky – botanist who proposed, in 1899, a mutation theory in evolution ("theory of heterogenesis"), which he thought was more accurate than Darwin's
- Valery Kostuk – Russian scientist who has contributed to the development of processes for producing gases and cryogenic liquids
- Gennady Kostyrchenko – historian
- Volodymyr Kosynsky – economist
- Aleksandr Kotseyovsky – historian, philologist and Egyptologist, specialising in the history of the ancient Egyptian religion
- Mikhail Kovalchuk – physicist
- Maksim Kovalevsky – main authority on sociology in the Russian Empire
- Vladimir Kovalevsky – statesman, scientist and entrepreneur
- Stepan Kozhumyaka – engineer, bridge-builder and linguist
- Mikhail Kravchuk – mathematician
- Afrikan Krishtofovich – Soviet geologist, paleobotanist and botanist
- Leonid Kulik – mineralogist who is noted for his research into meteorites
- Boris Kuzyk – economist, professor, member of Russian Academy of Sciences, Honored Scientist of the Russian Federation, director of the Institute for Economic Strategies
- Klyment Kvitka – musicologist and ethnographer
- Michael Lapinsky – neurologist and psychiatrist
- Mikhail Leontovich – Soviet physicist, member of Academy of Sciences of the Soviet Union, specializing in plasma and radiophysics
- Vladimir Lesevich – ethnographer, folklorist and literary historian
- Grigori Levitski – astronomer
- Grigory Levitsky – Soviet plant cytogeneticist
- Andrey Yevgenyevich Lichko – psychiatrist
- Yuri Linnik – Soviet mathematician active in number theory, probability theory and mathematical statistics
- Vladimir Lipsky – botanist
- Lev Lopatinsky – linguist, philologist, ethnographer, historian and researcher of the languages of the peoples of the Caucasus
- Gleb Lozino-Lozinskiy – lead developer of the Soviet Spiral and Shuttle Buran programme.
- Eduard Ludyansky – neurologist, acupuncturist, and apitherapist, Doctor of Medical Sciences and Doctor of the Highest Category
- Pyotr Lyashchenko – Soviet economist and a specialist in the field of economy, agriculture and history of the national economy of Russia and the Soviet Union, rector of Tomsk Imperial University in 1916
- Trofim Lysenko – agronomist and biologist
- Yuri Lysianskyi – explorer
- Vladimir Nikolaevich Lyubimenko – Soviet botanist and academician
- Arkhip Lyulka – Soviet scientist and designer of jet engines, head of the OKB Lyulka, member of the USSR Academy of Sciences
- Anton Makarenko – one of the founders of Soviet pedagogy
- Maria Makarevych – Soviet botanist and lichenologist
- Mikhail Maksimovich – professor in plant biology
- Vladimir Marchenko – mathematician
- Gury Marchuk – Soviet scientist in the fields of computational mathematics, and physics of atmosphere
- Aleksandr Markevich – zoologist, prolific helminthologist and copepodologist
- Mykola Markevych – historian and ethnographer
- Vladimir Martynenko – sociologist, economist, and political scientist; Doctor of political sciences, Professor, Chief Scientific Officer, Institute of Socio-Political Studies under the Russian Academy of Sciences (ISPI RAN).
- Igor Matsiyevsky – head of the Eurasian School of Contemporary Musicology and head of instrumental studies at the Russian Institute for Art History (РИИИ РАН) in Saint Petersburg, Doctor of Art Criticism, academic of the Russian Academy of Sciences
- Igor Mel'čuk – Soviet linguist
- Konstantin Mereschkowski – biologist and botanist, active mainly around Kazan, whose research on lichens led him to propose the theory of symbiogenesis – that larger, more complex cells (of eukaryotes) evolved from the symbiotic relationship between less complex ones
- Alexander Mikhailovsky-Danilevsky – historian and author of the first official history of the War of 1812, written in four volumes on the instructions of Nicholas I
- Nicholas Miklouho-Maclay – explorer, ethnologist, anthropologist and biologist
- Eugene Miroshnichenko – historian
- Michael I. Mishchenko – atmospheric physicist
- Alexandr Mishchenko – mathematician, specializing in differential geometry and topology and their applications to mathematical modeling in the biosciences
- Alexander Mordvilko – entomologist and parasitologist
- Aleksandr Nazarenko – historian
- Vladimir Nemoskalenko – physicist
- Yuri Nesterenko – mathematician
- Alexander Nikitenko – historian, censor, Professor of Saint Petersburg University, and ordinary member of St. Petersburg Academy of Sciences
- Vitaly Nikolayenko – natural scientist
- Olga Oleinik – Soviet mathematician who conducted pioneering work on the theory of partial differential equations, the theory of strongly inhomogeneous elastic media, and the mathematical theory of boundary layers
- Vasily Omeliansky – microbiologist and author of the first original Russian text book on microbiology
- Mikhail Ostrogradsky – mathematician
- Victor Ovcharenko – philosopher, sociologist, historian and psychologist
- Alexander Ozersky – military geologist
- Lev Palatnyk – Soviet physicist known for his contributions in the field of thin film physics and film material
- Vladislav Panchenko – Soviet and Russian scientist in the field of laser information technology, scientific instrumentation, nonlinear optics and medical physics, Doctor of Physical and Mathematical Sciences, Professor, Academician of the Russian Academy of Sciences (2008)
- Praskov′ja Georgievna Parchomenko – Soviet astronomer who discovered many minor planets between the years of 1930–1940
- Dmitry Petrushevsky – Soviet historian, medievalist, Academician of the USSR Academy of Sciences (since 1929)
- Ilya Pavlovich Petrushevsky – Soviet Orientalist and historian
- Fyodor Pirotsky – inventor of the world's first railway electrification system and electric tram
- Lev Pisarzhevsky – chemist
- Serhii Plokhy – historian
- Serhiy Podolynsky – socialist, physician, sociologist and an early pioneer of ecological economics
- Vladimir Podvysotsky – pathologist, endocrinologist, immunologist and microbiologist
- Platon Poretsky – Russian Imperial astronomer, mathematician, and logician
- Alexander Potebnja – Russian Imperial linguist
- Vladimir Pravdich-Neminsky – physiologist who published the first EEG and the evoked potential of the mammalian brain
- Antonina Prykhotko – Soviet experimental physicist
- Nikolay Przhevalsky – geographer and a renowned explorer of Central and East Asia
- Evgenii Przhevalsky – Soviet chemist, Doctor of Chemical Science, professor of Moscow University, dean of Faculty of Chemistry (1939–1944)
- Grigory Razumovsky – botanist, zoologist, geologist and mineralogist
- Pavel Rovinsky – historian, Slavist, ethnologist and geographer
- Sergei Rudenko – prominent Soviet anthropologist and archaeologist who discovered and excavated the most celebrated of Scythian burials, Pazyryk in Siberia
- Viktor Sadovnichiy – mathematician, winner of the 1989 USSR State Prize, and since 1992 he has been the rector of Moscow State University
- Stefan Grigorievich Samko – mathematician active in the field of functional analysis, function spaces and operator theory, retired professor of Mathematics at Algarve University and Rostov State University
- Yuri Savenko – psychiatrist
- Pavel Senko – Soviet polar explorer, scientist, and member and leader of numerous expeditions to Arctic Ocean and Antarctica under the auspices of the Arctic and Antarctic Research Institute and Soviet Antarctic Expedition
- Mariya Sergeyenko – Soviet scholar of Roman history and philologist
- Vladimir Shcherbina- Soviet geochemist and mineralogist
- Kalenyk Sheikovskyi – linguist, ethnographer, publisher, teacher
- Vladislav Shevchenko – astronomer who specializes in lunar exploration
- Alexandr Shiplyuk – scientist, Doctor of Physical and Mathematical Sciences, corresponding member of the Russian Academy of Sciences, a specialist in the field of gas dynamics
- Anatoly Shvidenko – doctor of Biological science
- Dmitry Shvidkovsky – historian
- Julian Simashko – zoologist and entomologist
- Igor Simonenko – mathematician
- Anatoly Skalny – physician and biomedical scientist in the field of trace elements,[1] founder of the Bioelementology scientific school
- Georgii Skrotskii – physicist
- Anatol Slissenko – Soviet mathematician and computer scientist
- Vadym Slyusar – founder of tensor-matrix theory of digital antenna arrays (DAAs), N-OFDM and other theories in fields of radar systems, smart antennas for wireless communications and digital beamforming
- Valery Solovei – historian, political scientist and conspiracy theorist, who served as the professor and head of the Public Relations Department at the Moscow State Institute of International Relations (MGIMO)
- Taisiya Maksimovna Stadnichenko – geologist and chemist, whose fieldwork focused on the distribution of germanium and the minor-element content in coal
- Sergei Starchenko – mathematical logician
- Vladimir Staroselski – Imperial Russian official who served as the governor of the Kutais Governorate from May 1905 to January 1906
- Ignatiy Stelletsky – Soviet archaeologist, historian, and researcher of the tunnels of Moscow
- Vasyl Stepanchenko – Soviet aircraft designer, Hero of Socialist Labor
- Anna Stetsenko, Soviet psychologist
- Oleksa Storozhenko – anthropologist
- Nikolay Vladimirovich Storozhenko, historian
- Nikolay Ilyich Storozhenko, literary historian
- Nicolas Stoyko – astronomer
- Nikolay Strazhesko – physiologist and therapist
- Boris Struminsky – physicist known for his contribution to theoretical elementary particle physics
- Vilen Strutinsky – Soviet nuclear physicist
- Vasyl Sukhomlynsky – humanistic educator in the Soviet Union who saw the aim of education in producing a truly humane being
- Alexander Tantlevsky – art historian
- Felix Tarasenko – mathematician
- Fedir Fedorovych Tereshchenko – aircraft designer
- Valery Tereshchenko – Russian−Soviet academic
- Stephen Timoshenko – engineer and academician, considered to be the father of modern engineering mechanics
- Vyacheslav Tishchenko – chemist
- Vsevolod Tkachuk – Soviet chemist and academic
- Kirill Tolpygo – Soviet physicist
- Mikhail Tsapenko – Soviet and Russian scientist, doctor of technical sciences, professor (1988), Honored Worker of Science and Technology of the RSFSR, measuring equipment specialist
- Mikhail Tsvet – botanist who invented chromatography
- Mikhail Tugan-Baranovsky – economist
- Konstantin Ushinsky – founder of scientific pedagogy in the Russian Empire
- Alexander Ivanovich Ustyumenko – Soviet scientist, Doctor of Physical and Mathematical Sciences (1980), and laureate of the Lenin Prize (1959)
- Alexander Varchenko – Soviet and Russian mathematician working in geometry, topology, combinatorics and mathematical physics
- Mikhail Vaschenko-Zakharchenko – mathematician, member of Moscow Mathematical Society from 1866 and Privy Councillor of Russia from 1908
- Georgy Vasilchenko – neuropathologist and the pioneer of sexology in the USSR
- George Vernadsky – historian
- Vladimir Vernadsky – mineralogist and geochemist
- Victor Veselago – Soviet physicist, doctor of physical and mathematical sciences, and a university professor
- Sergiy Vilkomir – computer scientist
- Anatoly Vishnevsky – demographer and economist
- Bogdan Voitsekhovsky – scientist, specialist in the field of hydraulic impulse technique, explosion physics, atmospheric electricity, employee of the Institute of Hydrodynamics
- Andrey Voronenko – mathematician, Professor, Dr.Sc., a professor at the Faculty of Computer Science at the Moscow State University
- Nadezhda Voronets (Kulzhinskaya) – Soviet geologist and paleontologist
- Georgy Voronoy – Imperial Russian mathematician noted for defining the Voronoi diagram
- Boris Evgenyevich Votchal – academician of the USSR Academy of Medical Sciences (since 1969), Honored Scientist of the Russian Federation (1966), one of the founders of the clinical pharmacology in Russia
- Fedir Vovk, anthropologist-archaeologist, the curator of the Alexander III Museum in St. Petersburg
- Volodymyr Vysokovych – Microbiologist
- Georgy Vysotsky – Soviet soil scientist and forester who worked in the steppe, where he examined forest growth and the effects of soil factors
- Sergei Winogradsky – microbiologist, ecologist and soil scientist who pioneered the cycle-of-life concept
- Nikolai Yanenko – Soviet mathematician
- Dmytro Yavornytsky – academician, historian, archeologist, ethnographer, folklorist, and lexicographer
- Pyotr Yefimenko – ethnographer and historian
- Daniil Zabolotny – epidemiologist and the founder of the world's first research department of epidemiology
- Andrey Zaliznyak – linguist who specialized in historical linguistics, morphology, accentology, and dialectology
- Alexander Zaporozhets – Soviet developmental psychologist
- Nikolai Zarudny – explorer and zoologist who studied the flora and fauna of Central Asia
- Alexander Zasyadko – Russian Imperial gunner and specialist in rocketry
- Boris Zavadovsky – Soviet physiologist
- Yevgeny Zavoisky – Soviet physicist known for discovery of electron paramagnetic resonance in 1944
- Nikolay Zelinsky – Soviet chemist and educator, inventor of the first effective filtering activated charcoal gas mask in the world (1915)
- Sergey Zhuk – Soviet hydraulic engineer, technician and state official
- Pavlo Zhytetsky – linguist, philologist, ethnographer and literary historian, Doctor of Russian Literature (1908)
- Pyotr Zinchenko – developmental psychologist
- Georgy Zolotarenko – ScDr., professor, entomologist specialized in Lepidoptera, mainly Noctuidae: Noctuinae

=== Politics ===
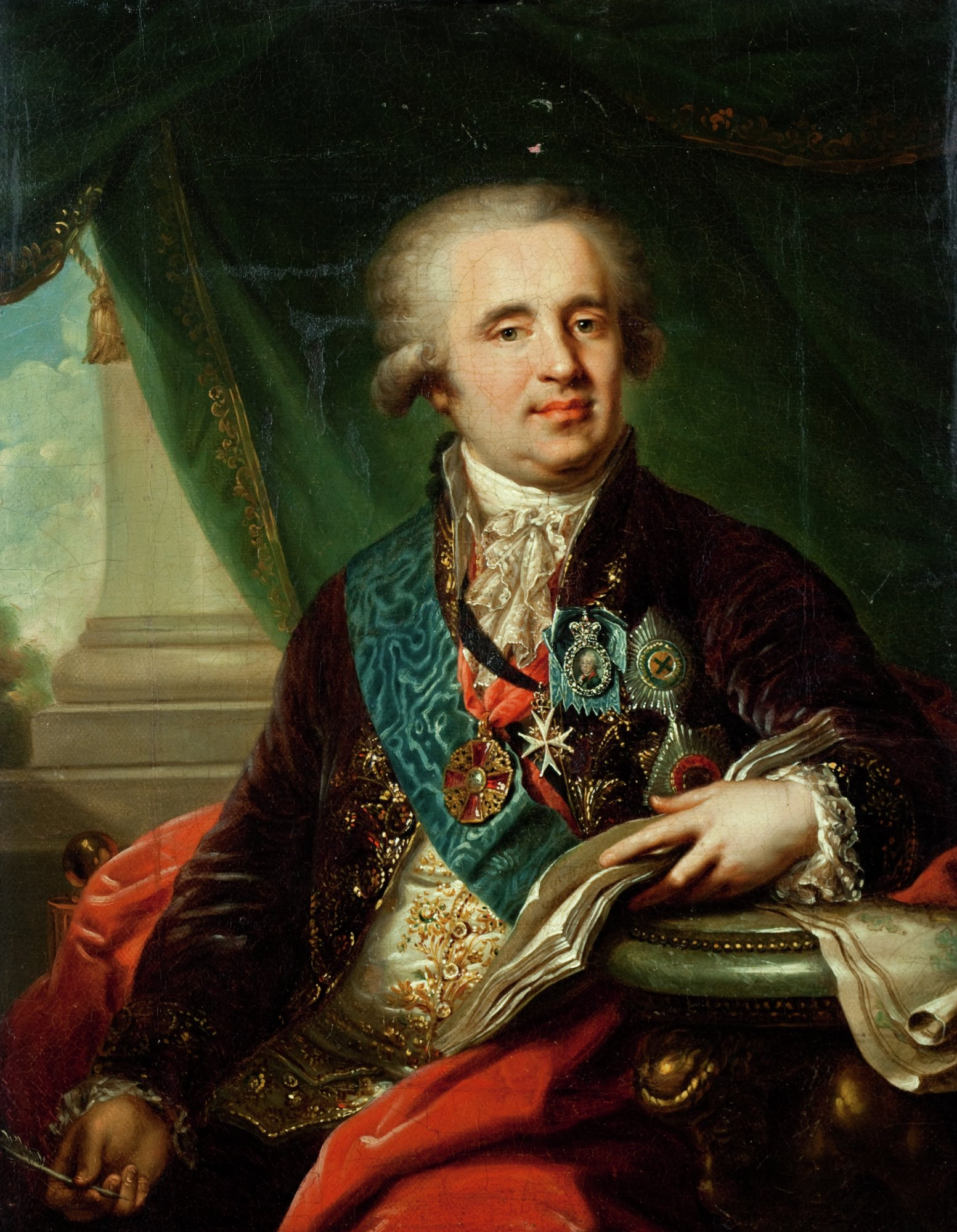
Alexander Bezborodko

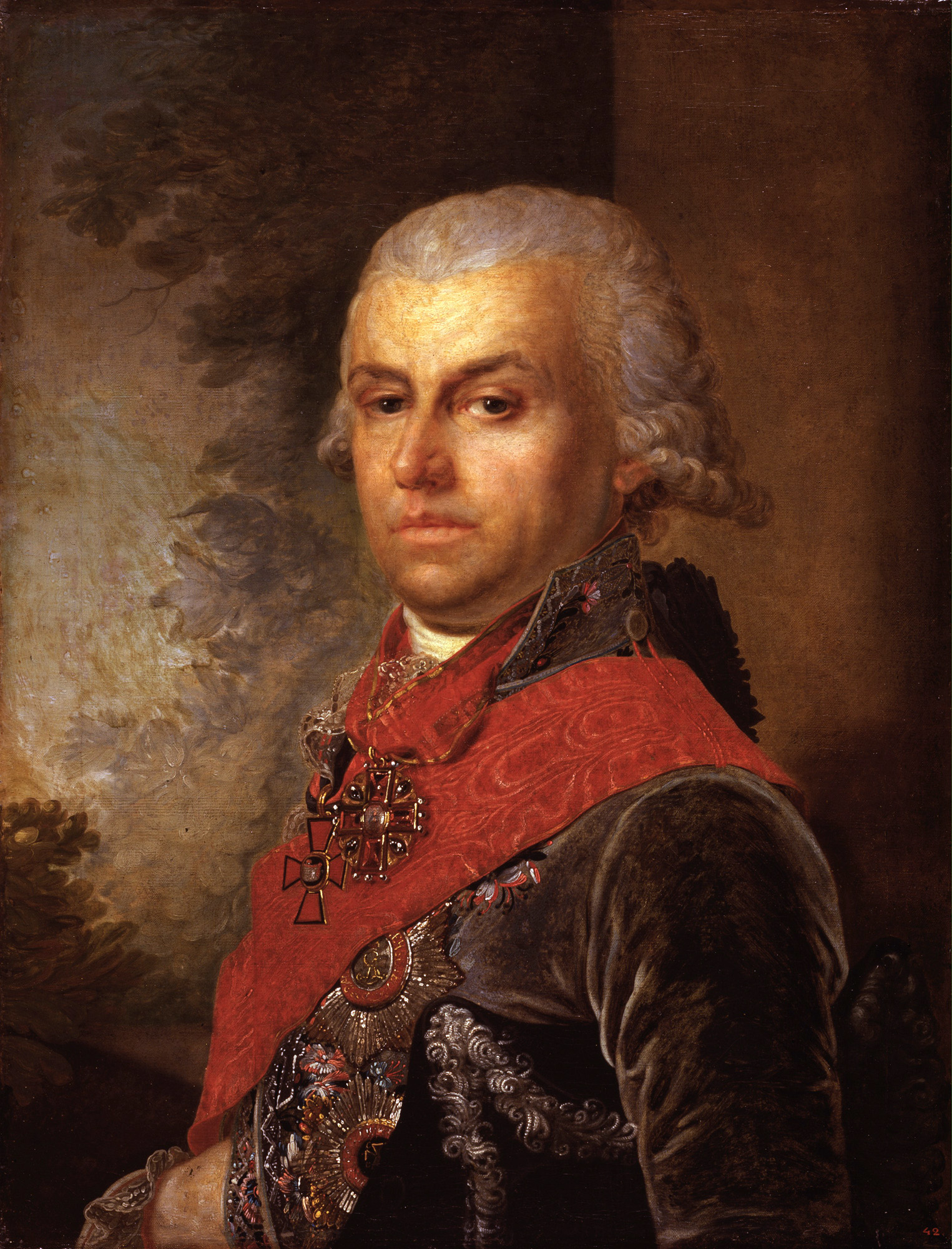
Dmitry Troshchinsky

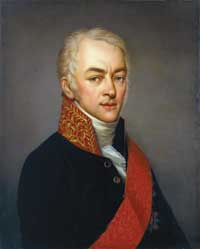
Alexey Razumovsky

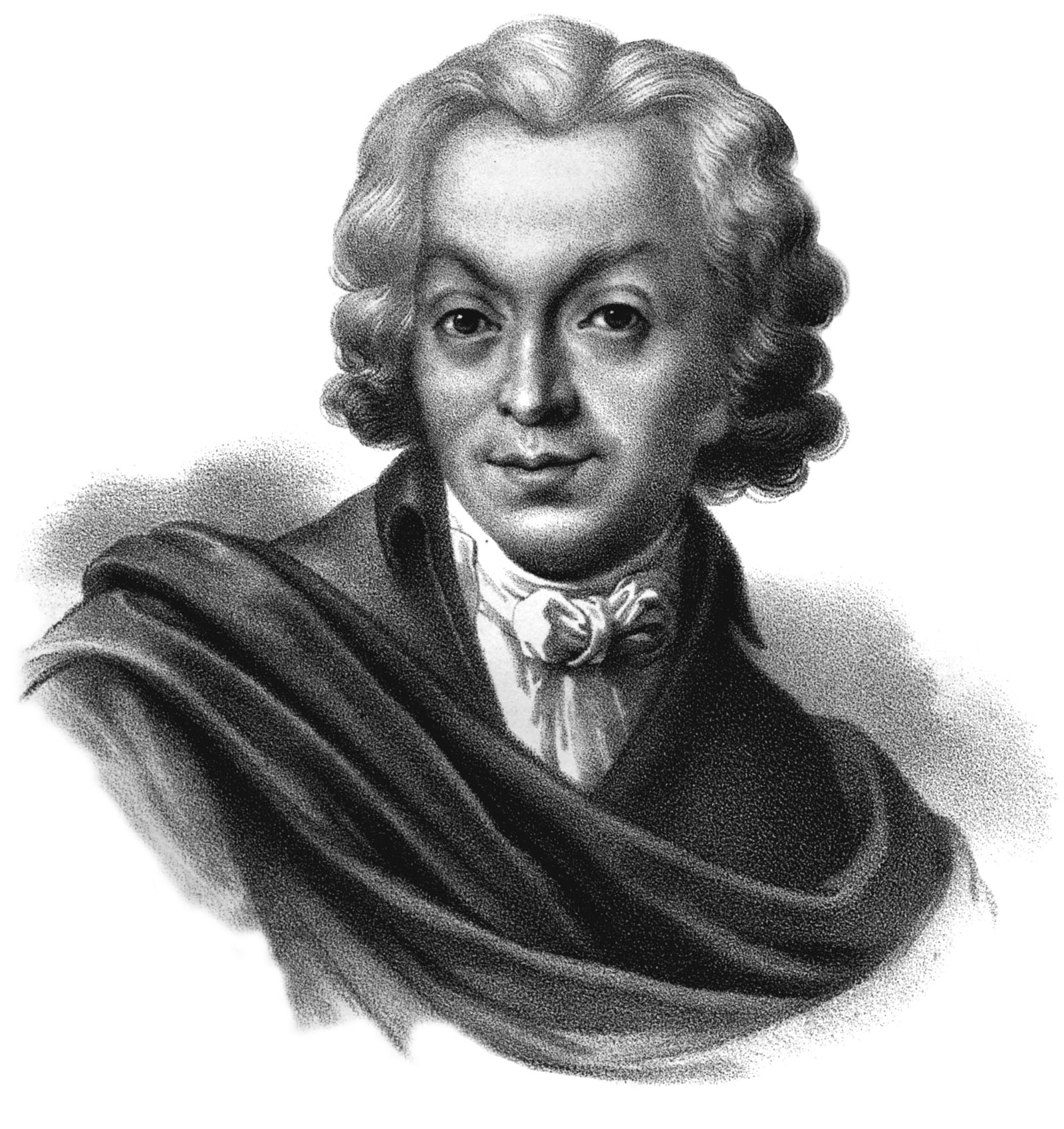
Vasily Kapnist

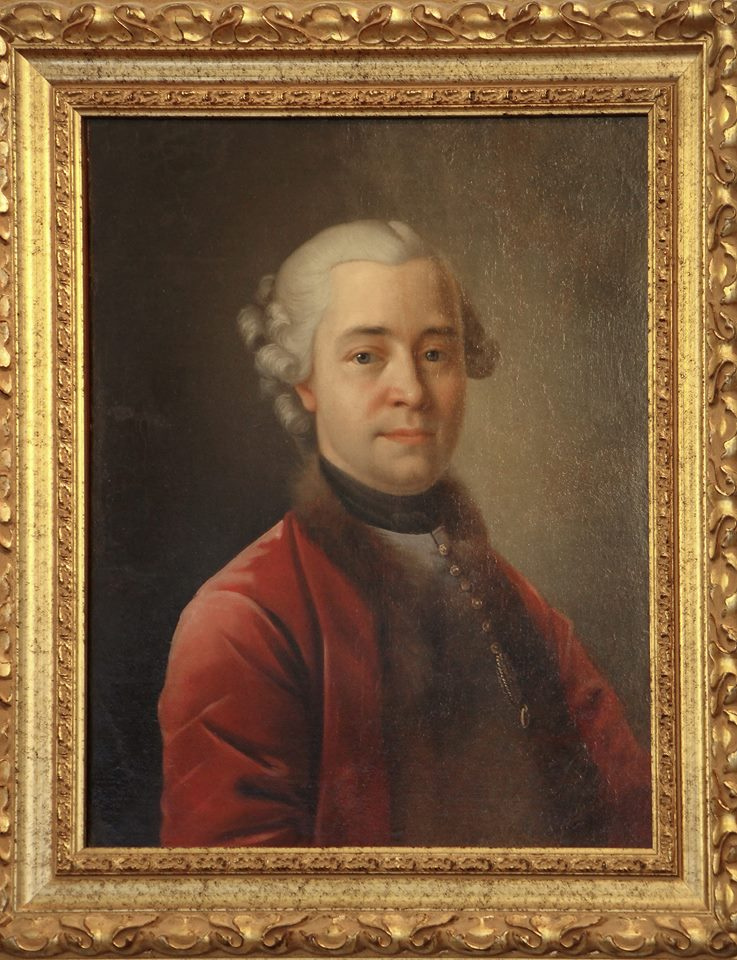
Grigory Kozitsky

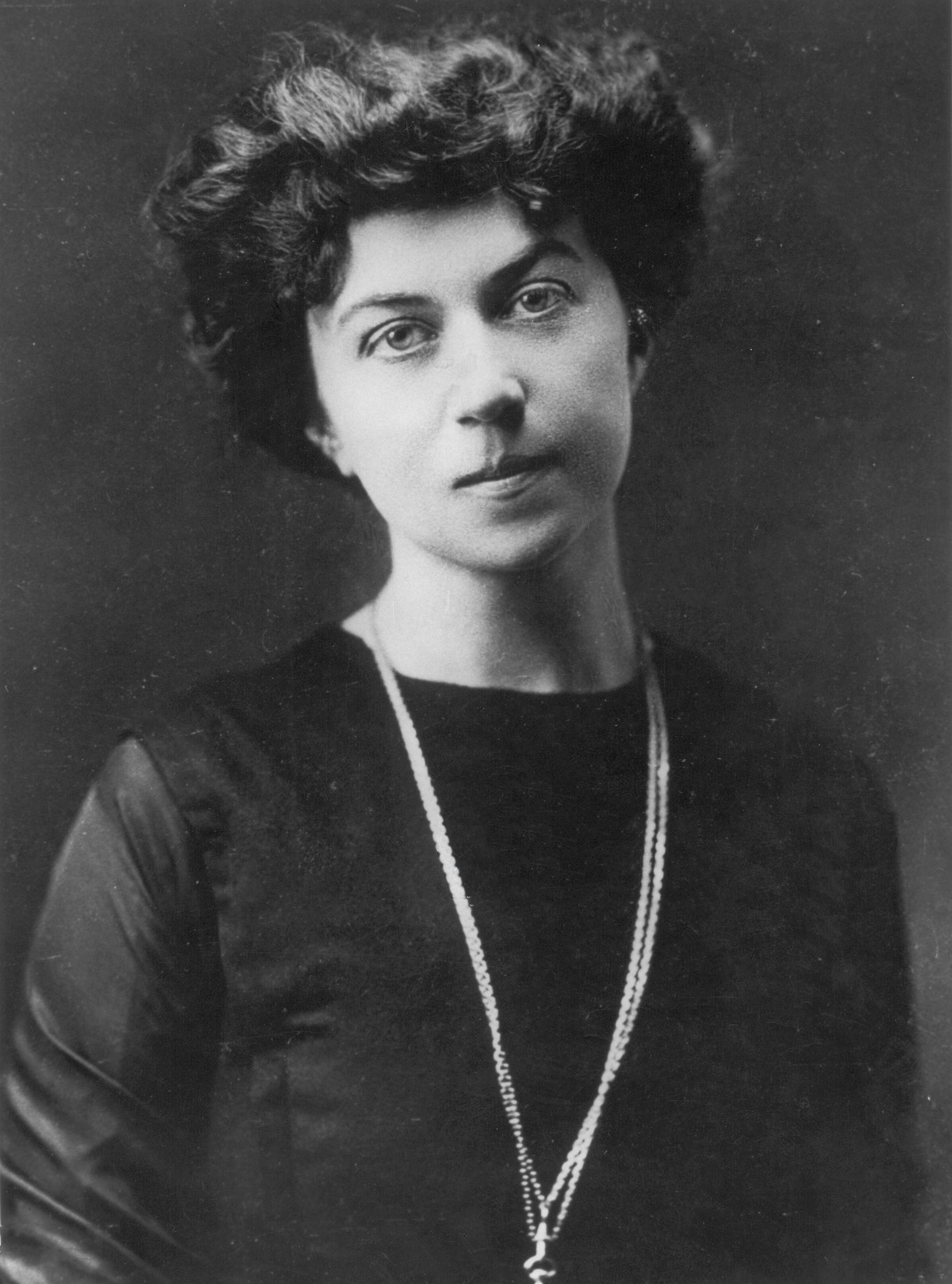
Alexandra Kollontai

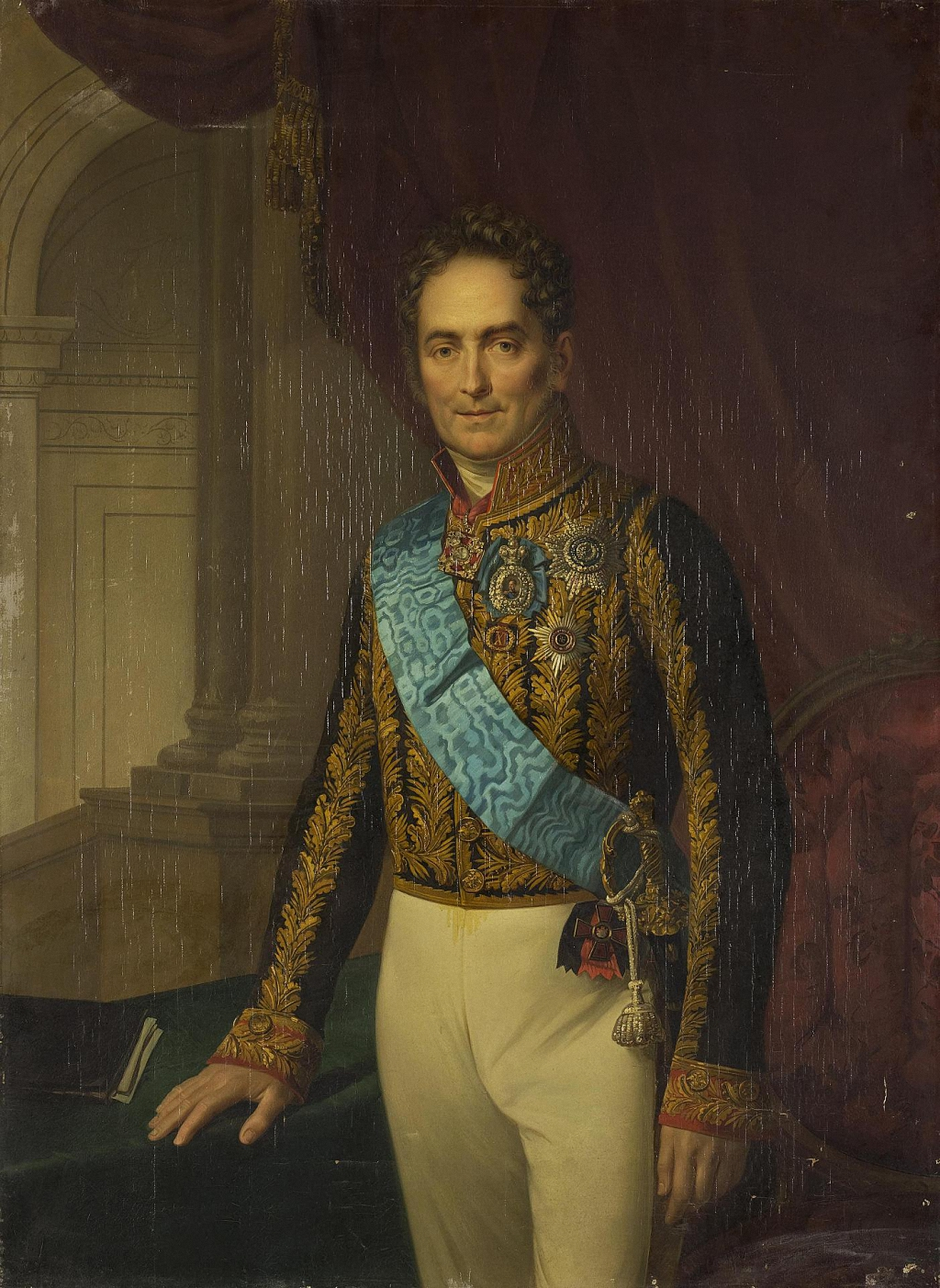
Viktor Kochubey

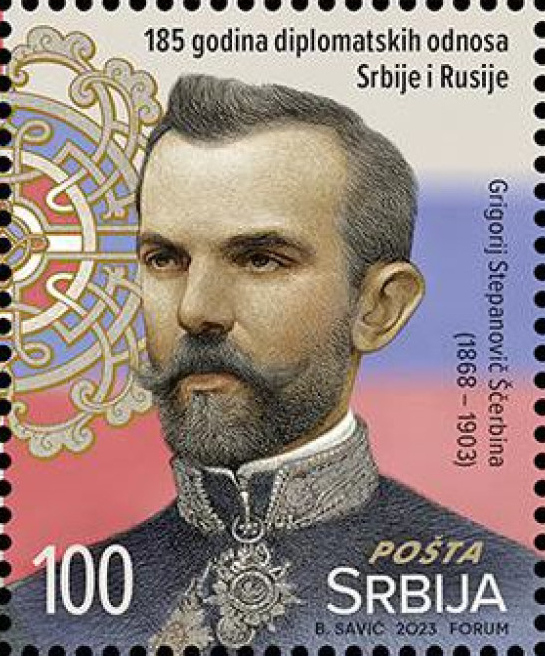
Grigoriy Shcherbina

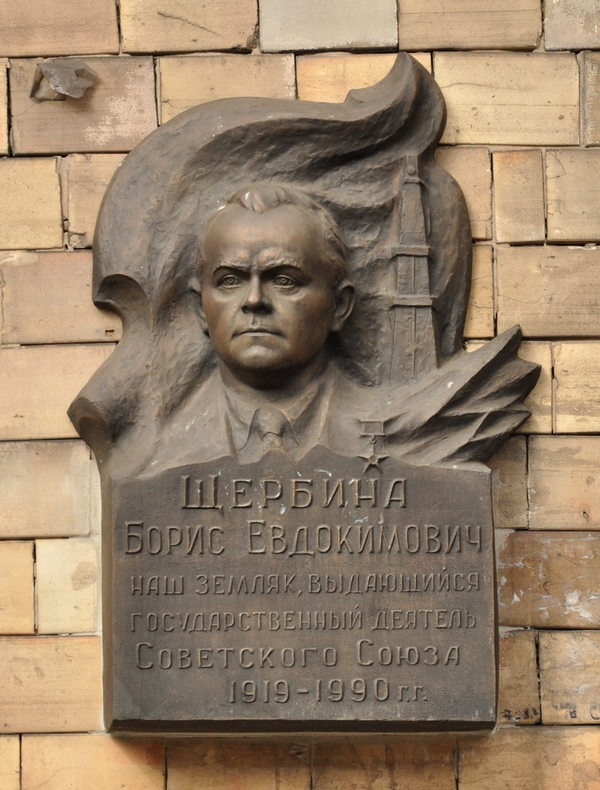
Boris Shcherbina

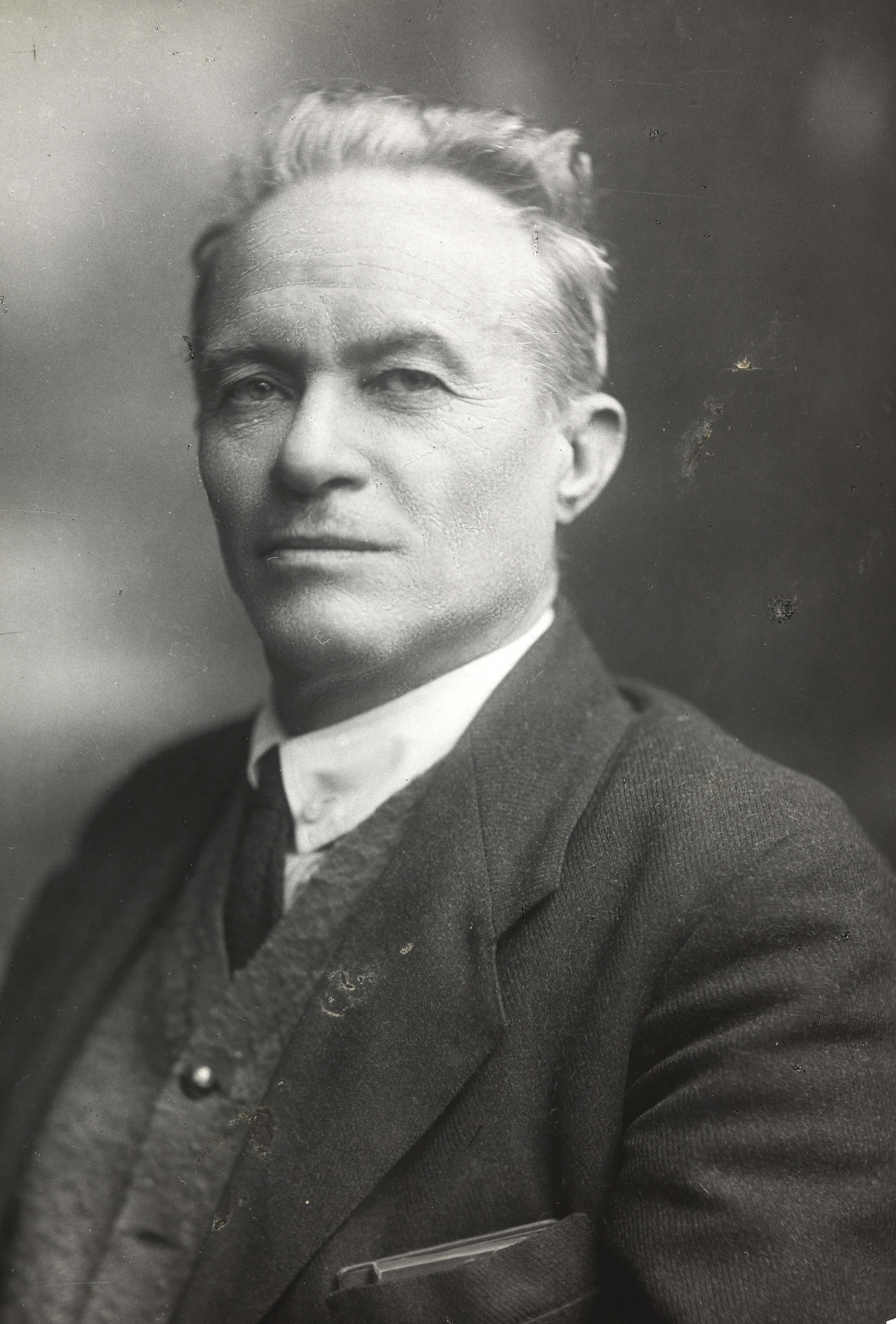
Alexander Tsiurupa

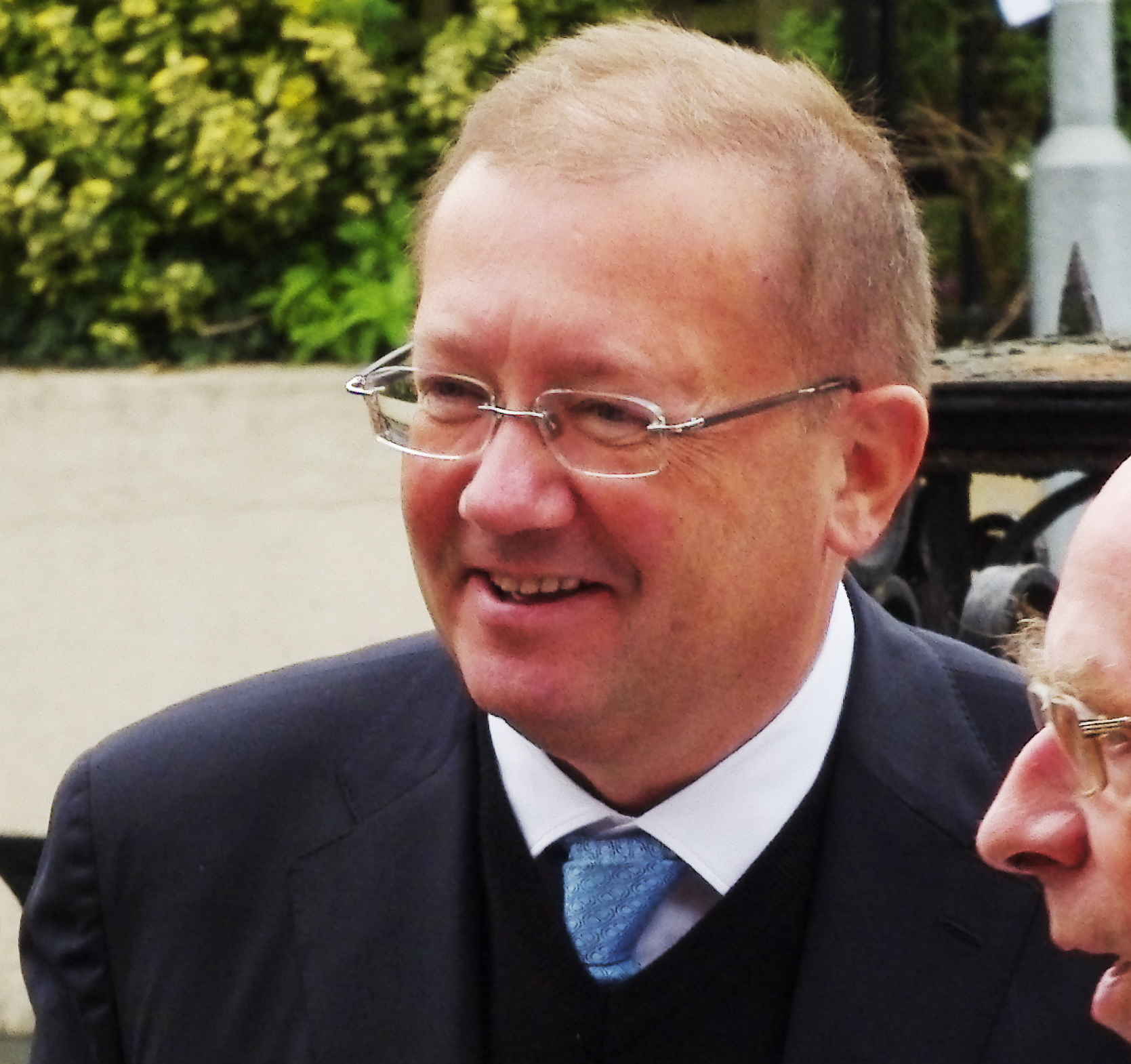
Alexander Yakovenko (diplomat)

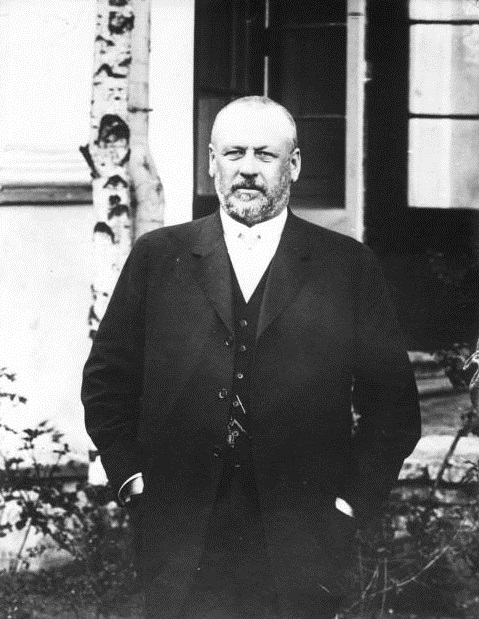
Mikhail Rodzianko

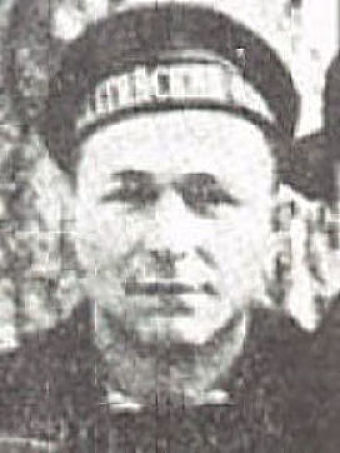
Stepan Petrichenko

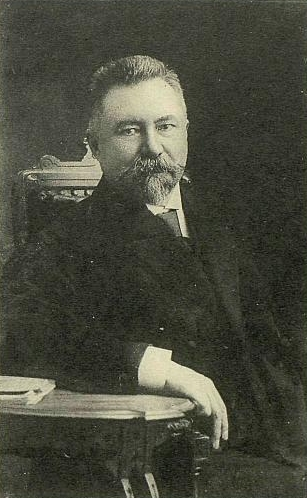
Mikhail Alekseyenko

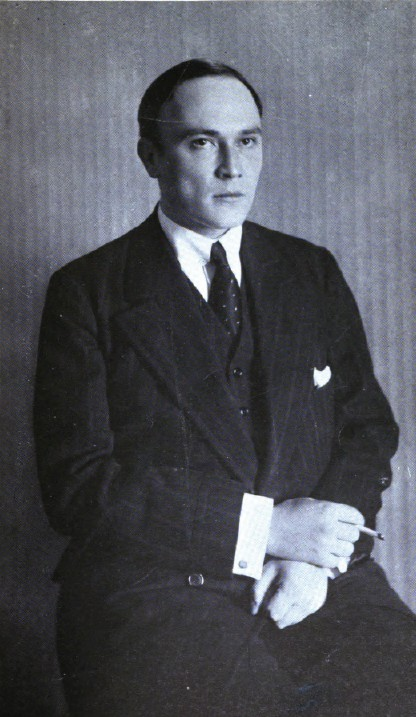
Mikhail Tereshchenko

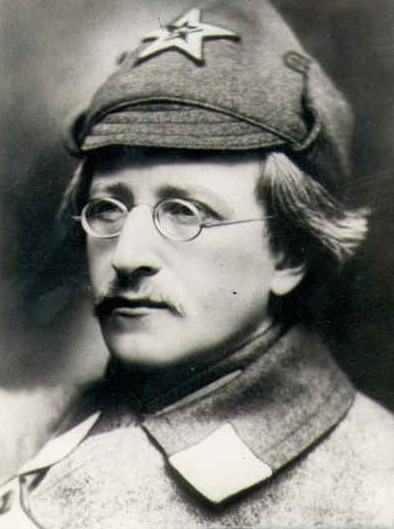
Vladimir Antonov-Ovseyenko

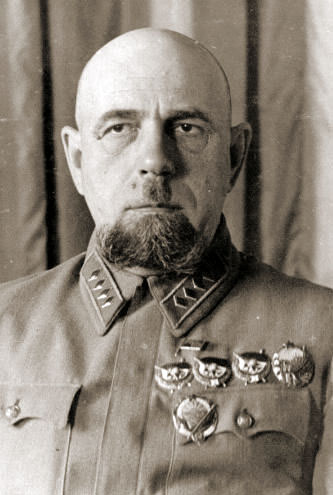
Pavel Dybenko

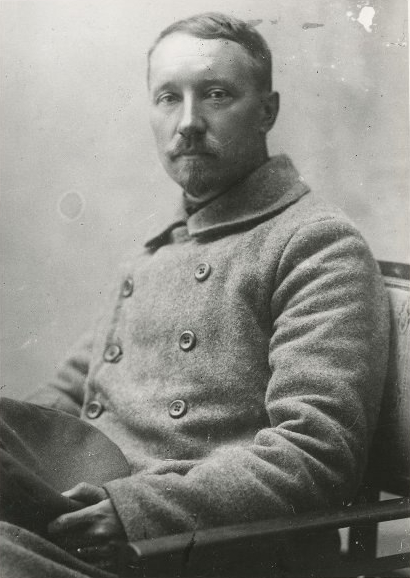
Nikolai Podvoisky

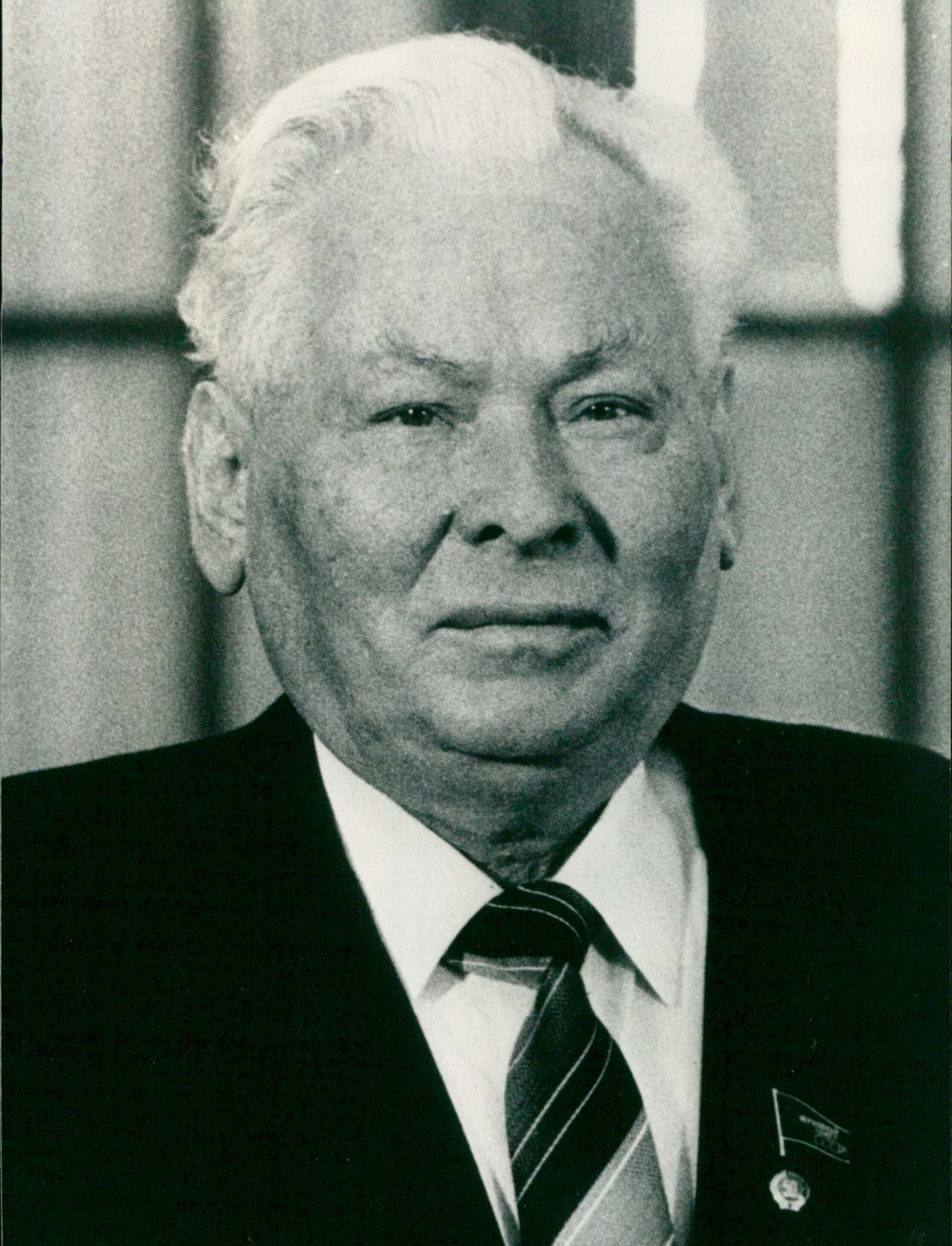
Konstantin Chernenko

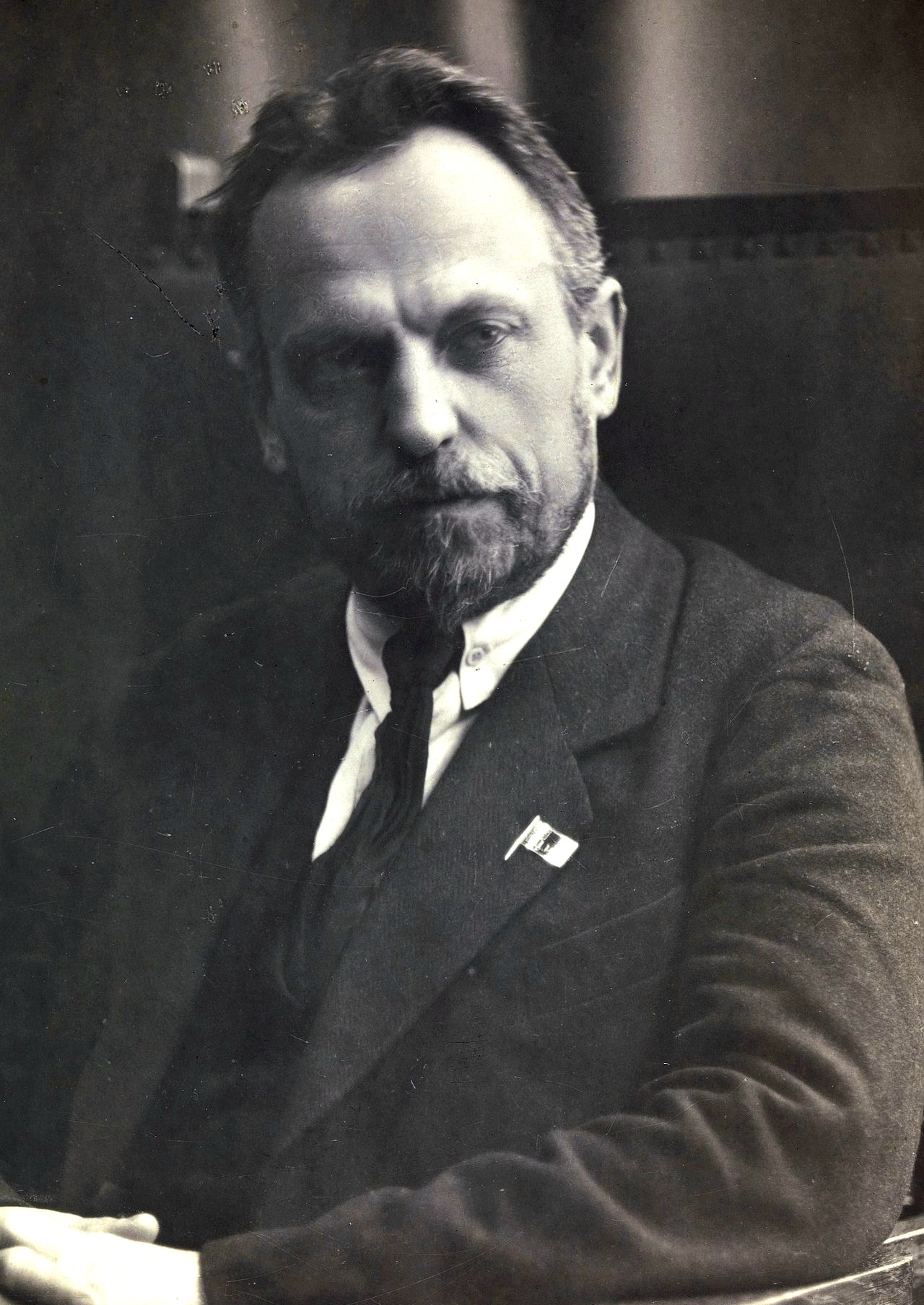
Nikolai Semashko

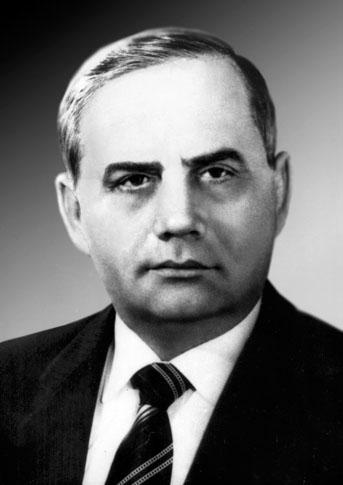
Vladimir Ivashko

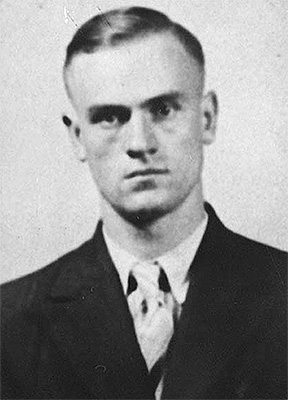
Igor Gouzenko

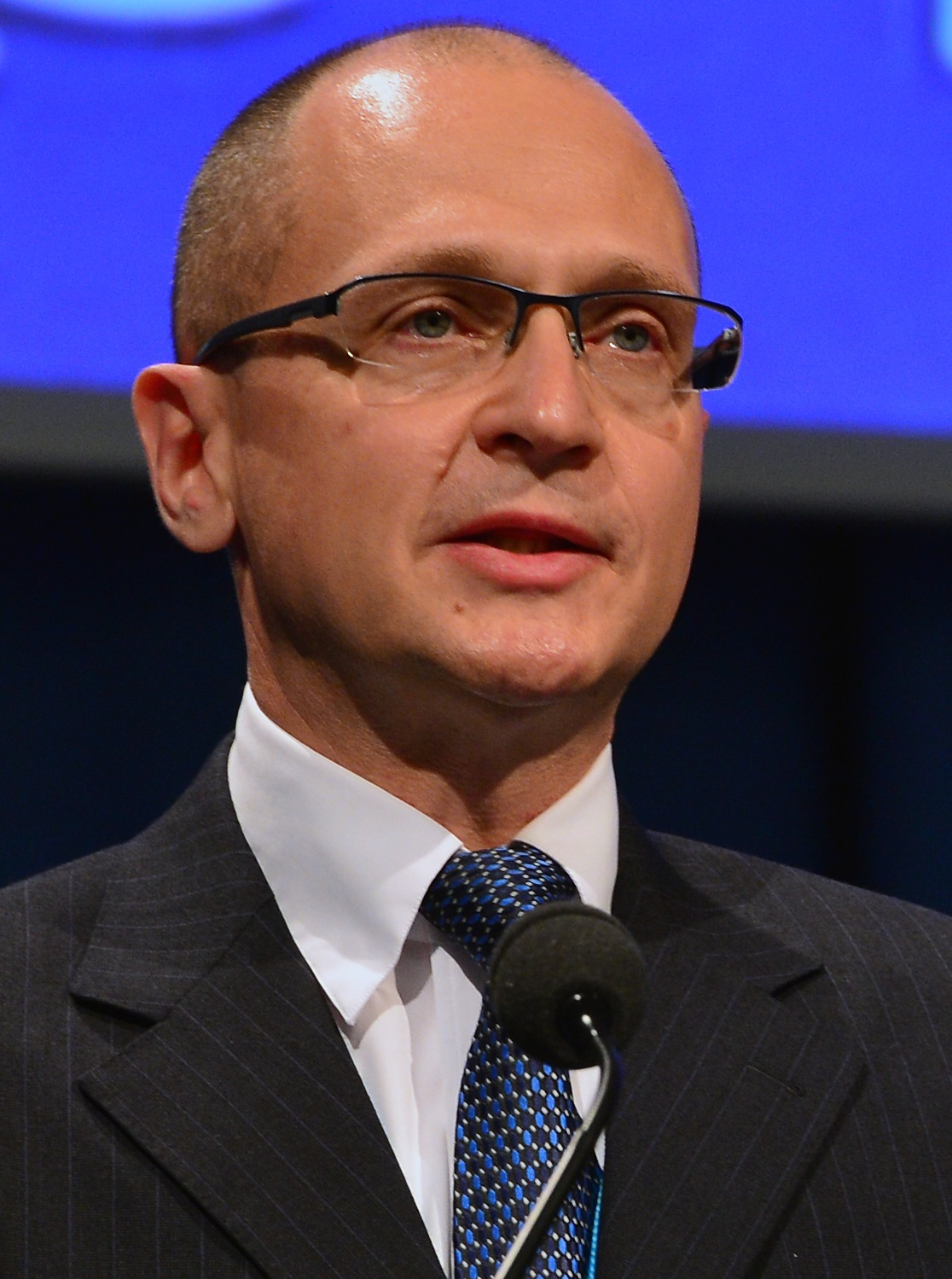
Sergey Kiriyenko

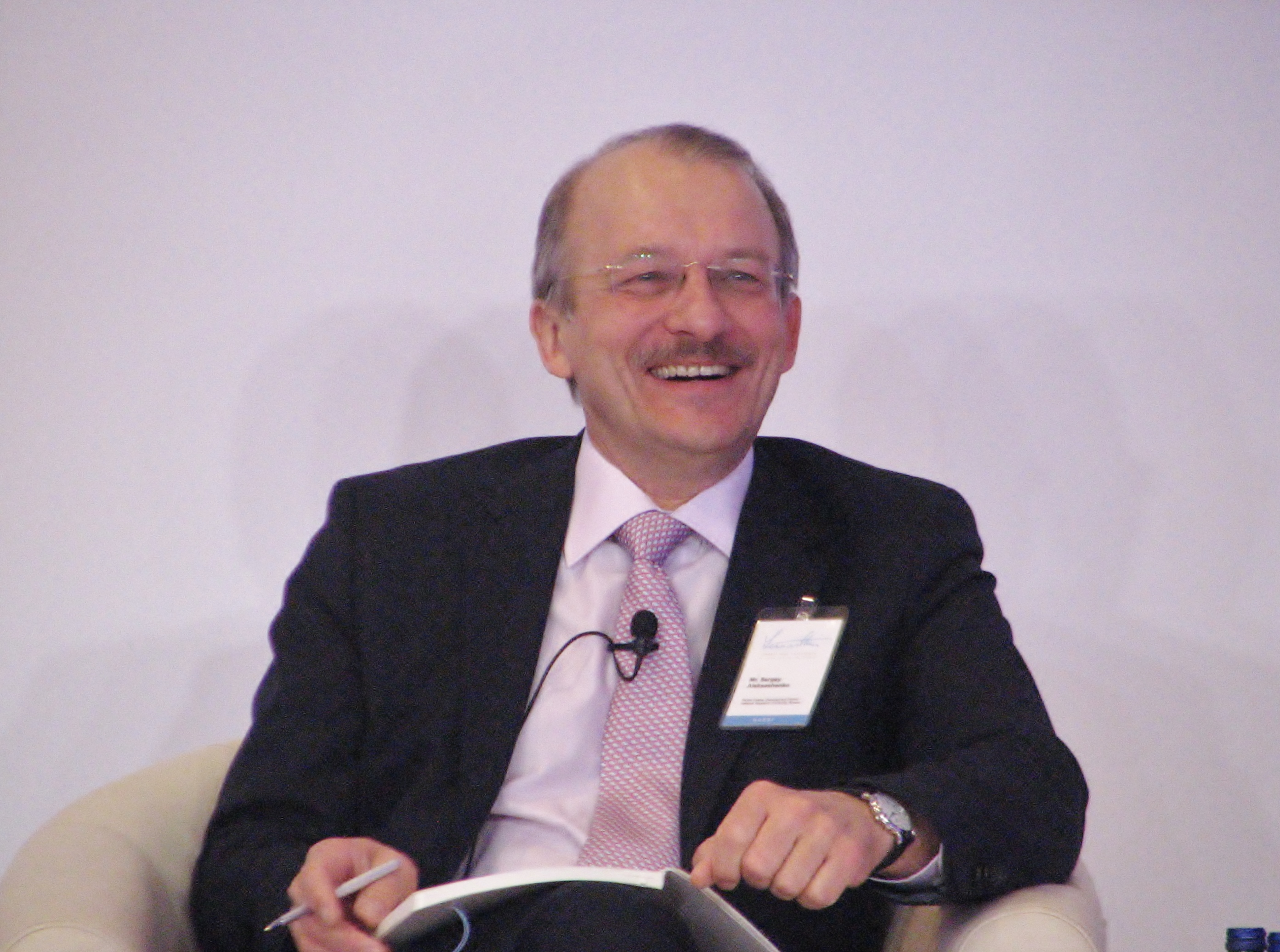
Sergey Aleksashenko

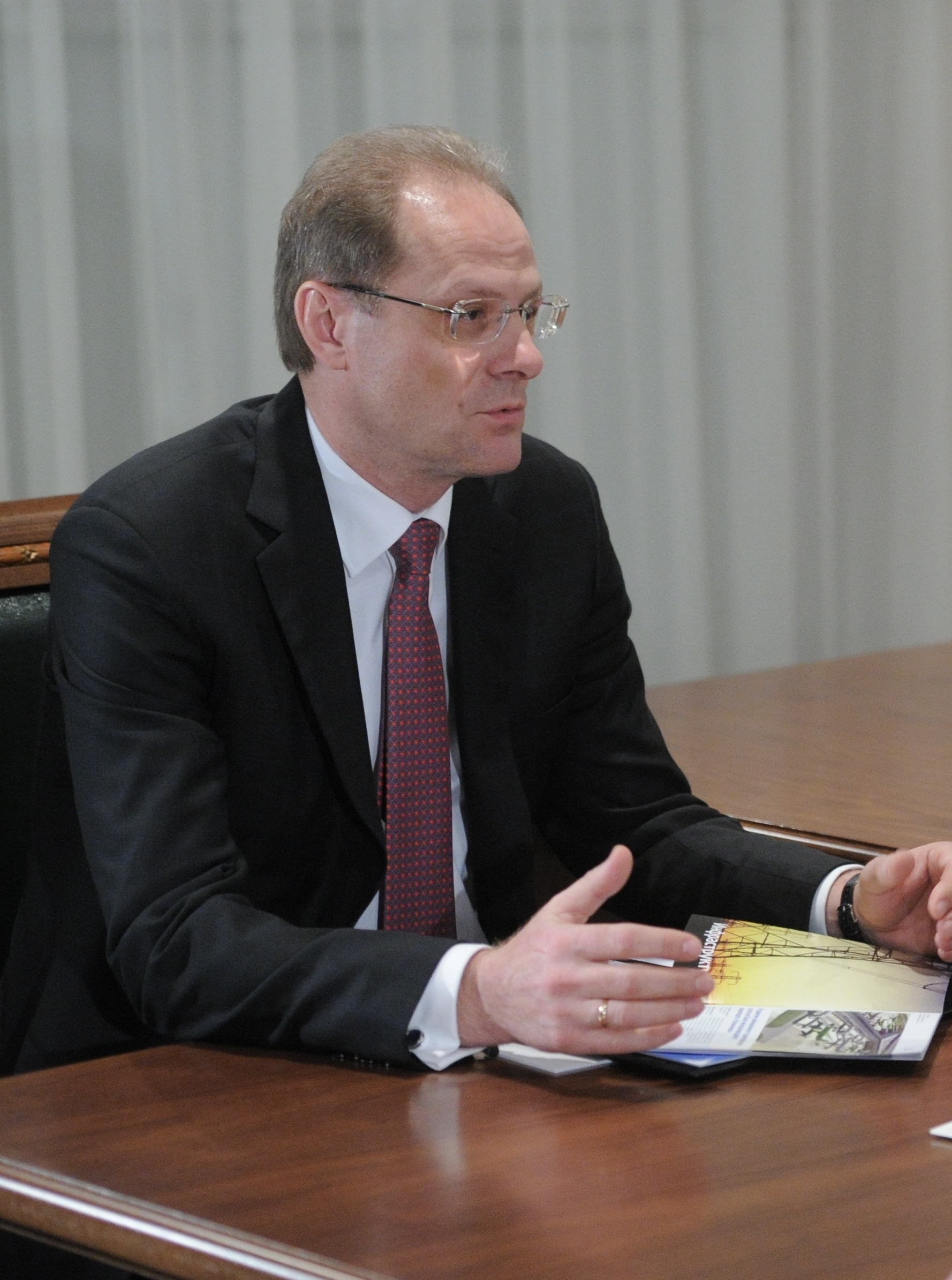
Vasily Yurchenko

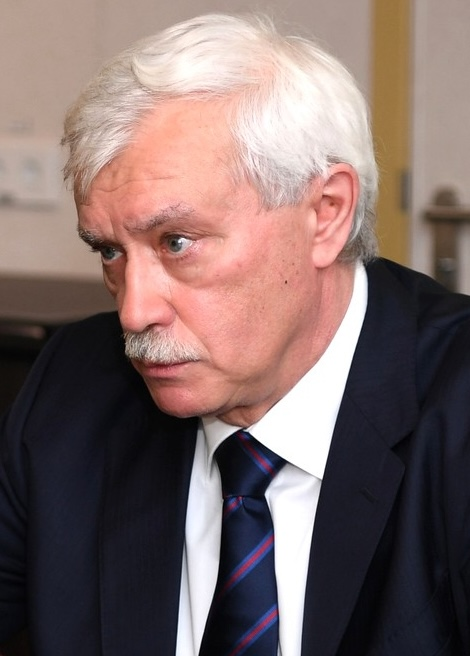
Georgy Poltavchenko

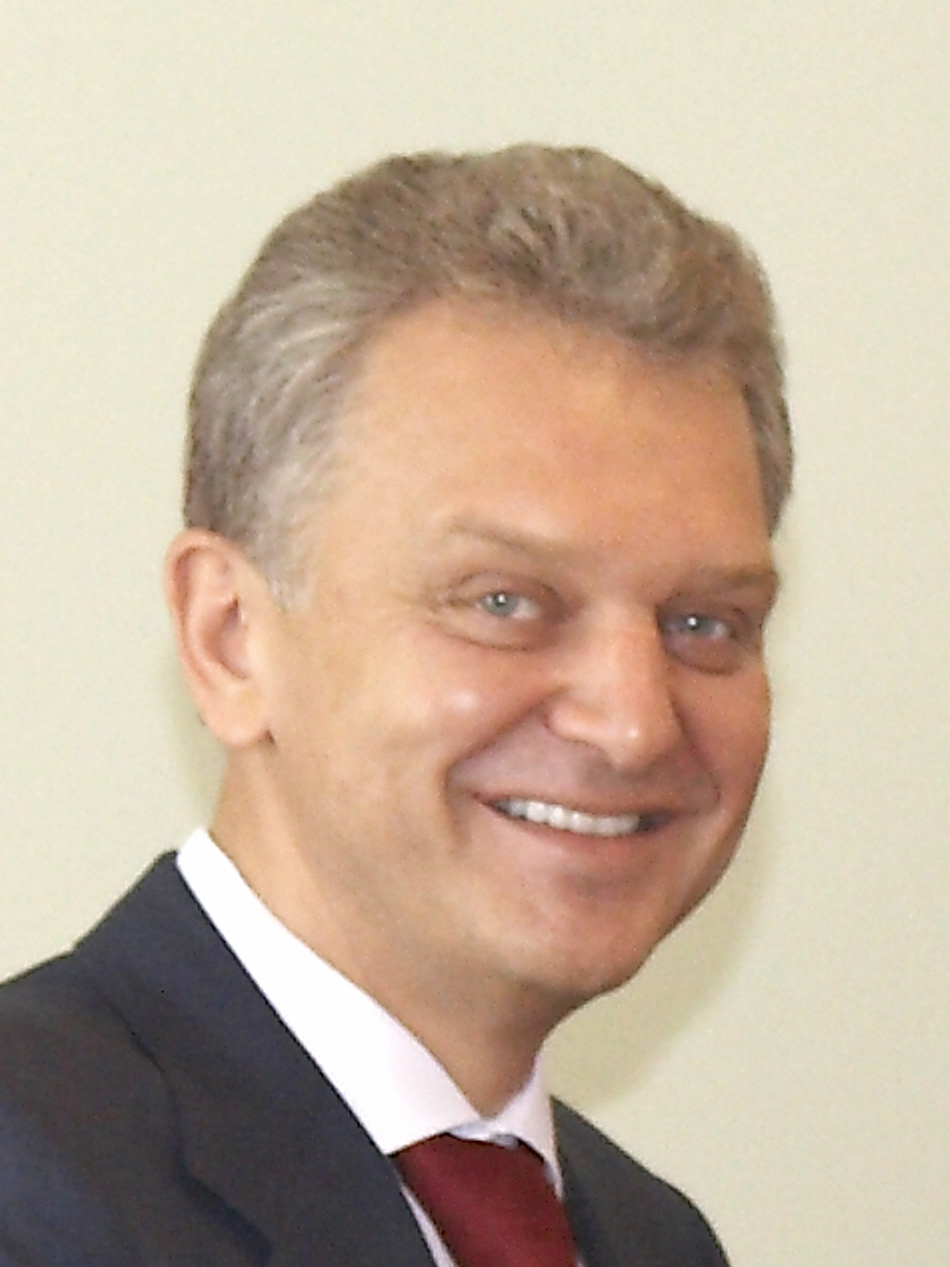
Viktor Khristenko

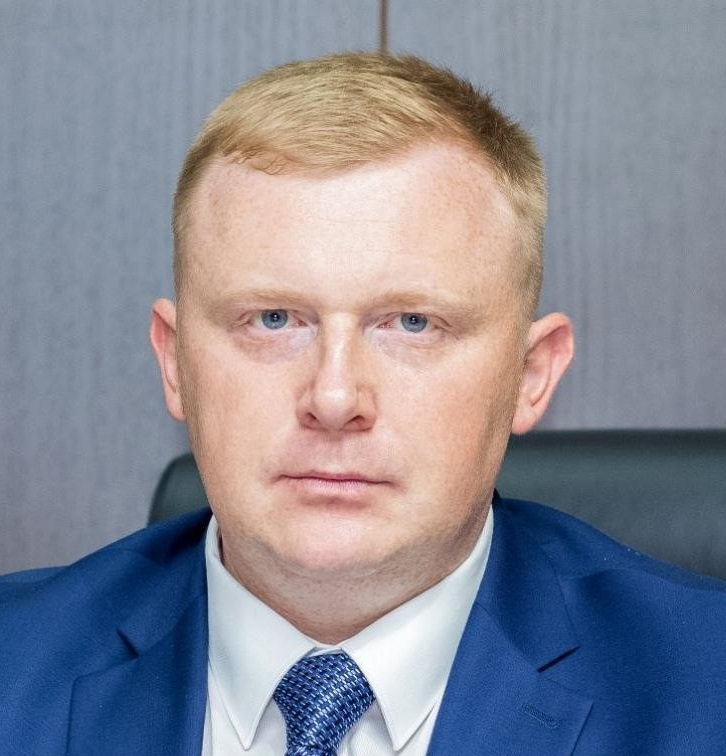
Andrey Ishchenko

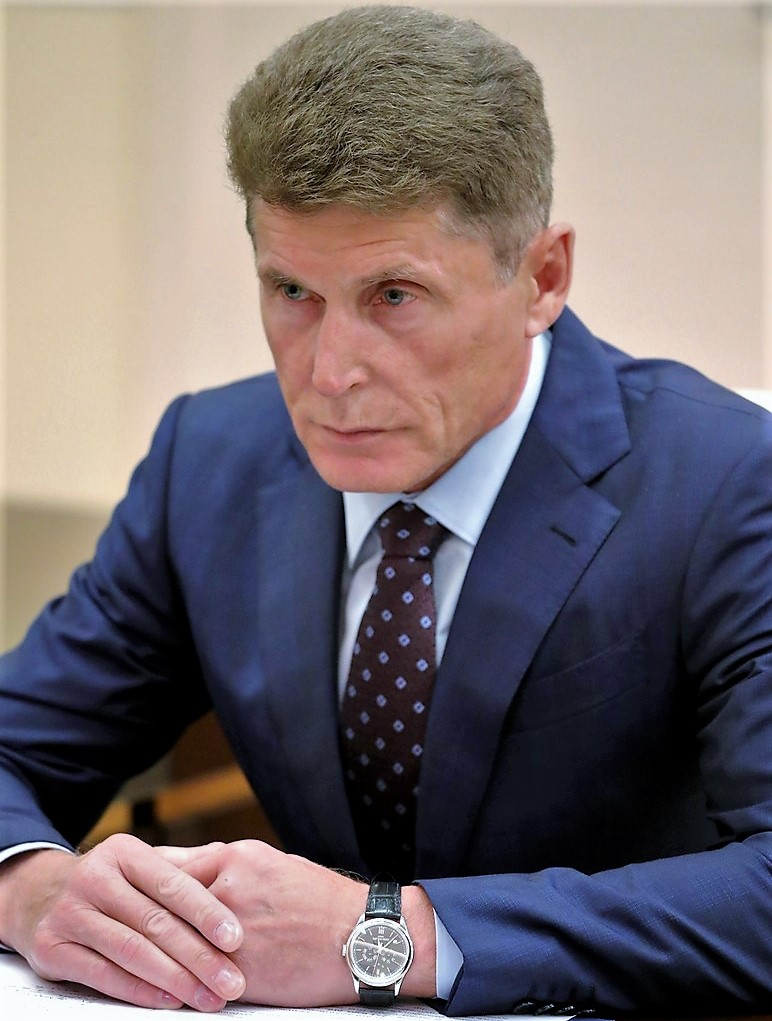
Oleg Kozhemyako

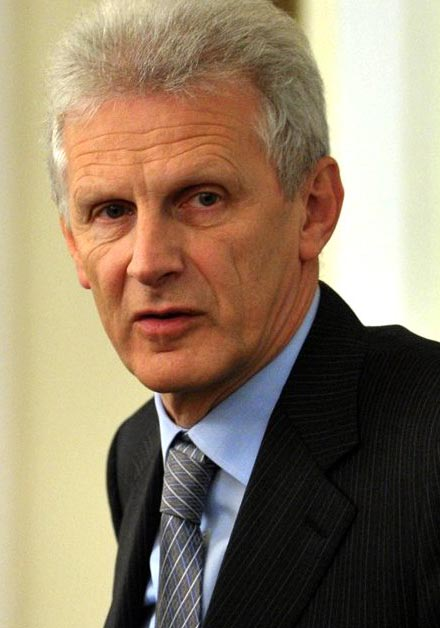
Andrei Fursenko

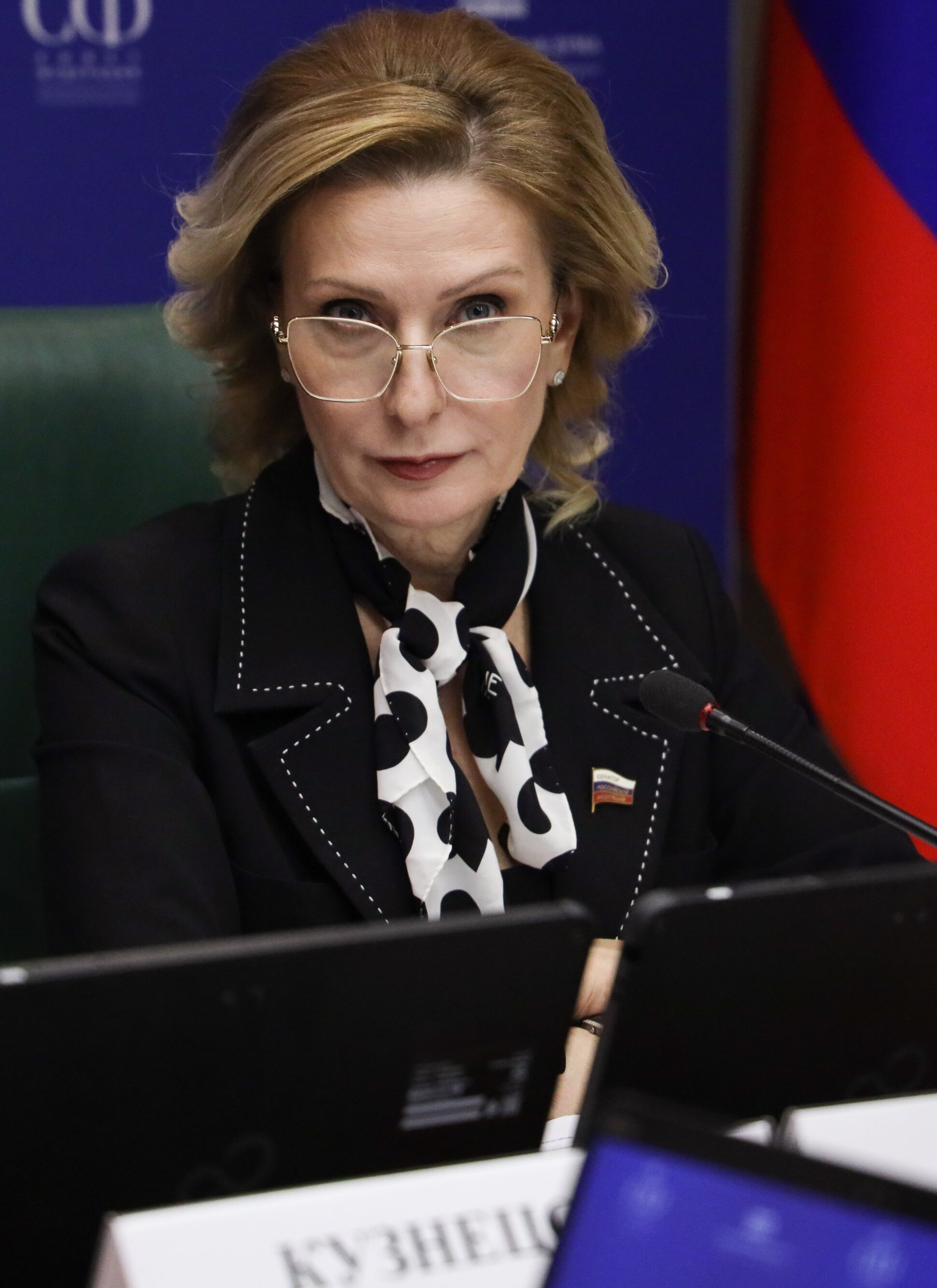
Inna Svyatenko

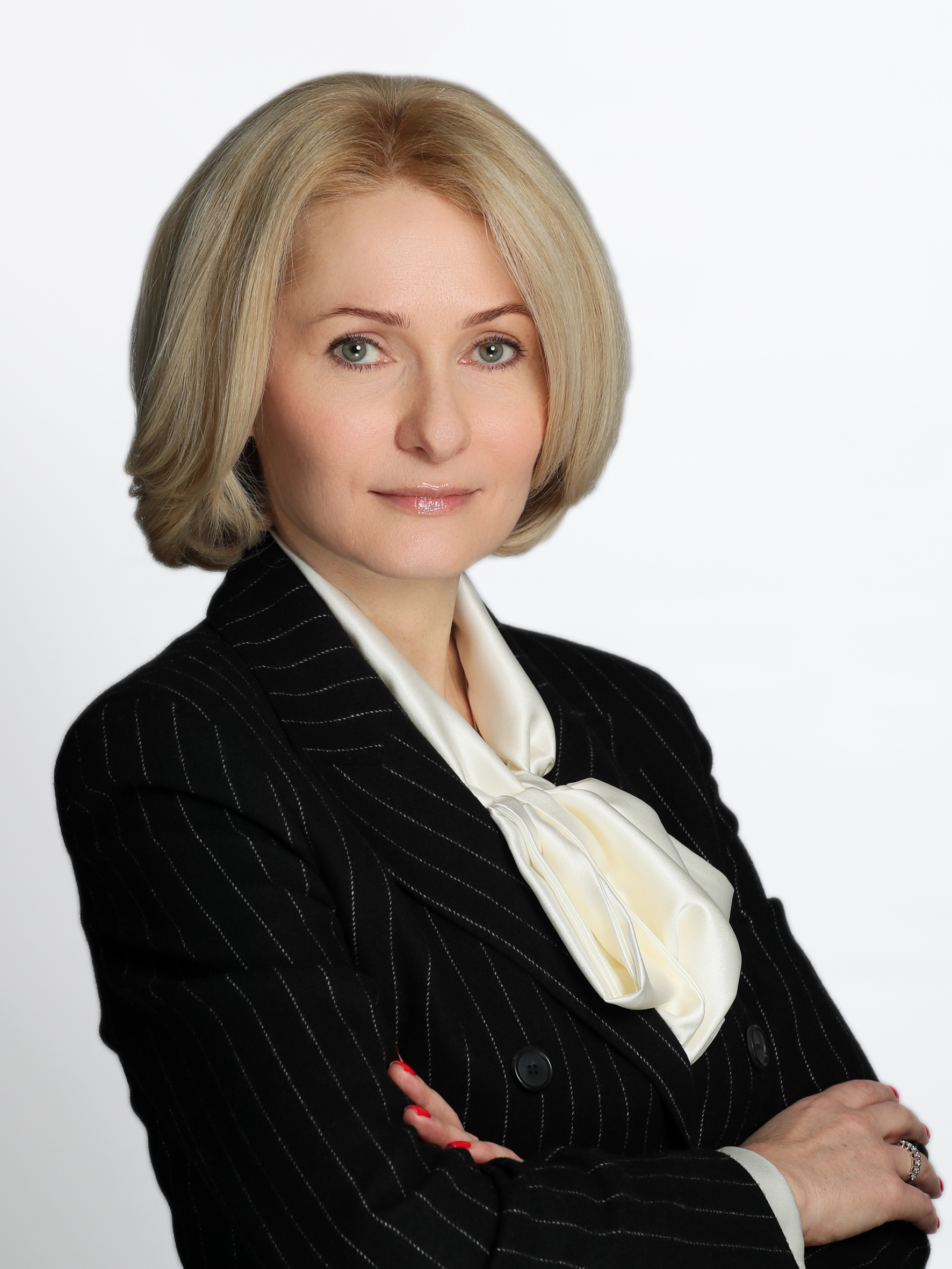
Viktoria Abramchenko

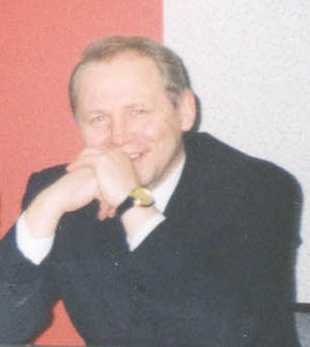
Yury Savenko

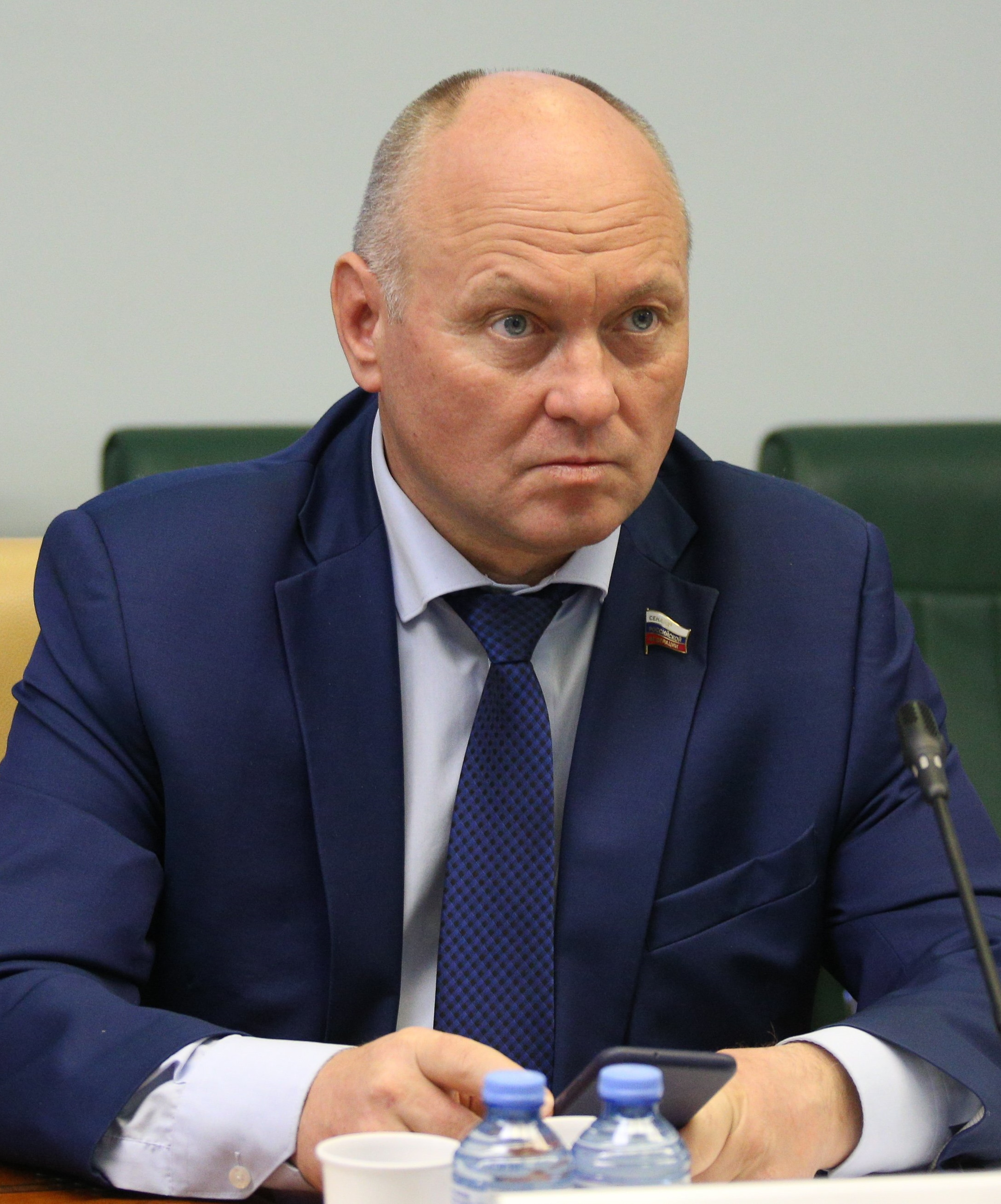
Aleksey Kondratenko

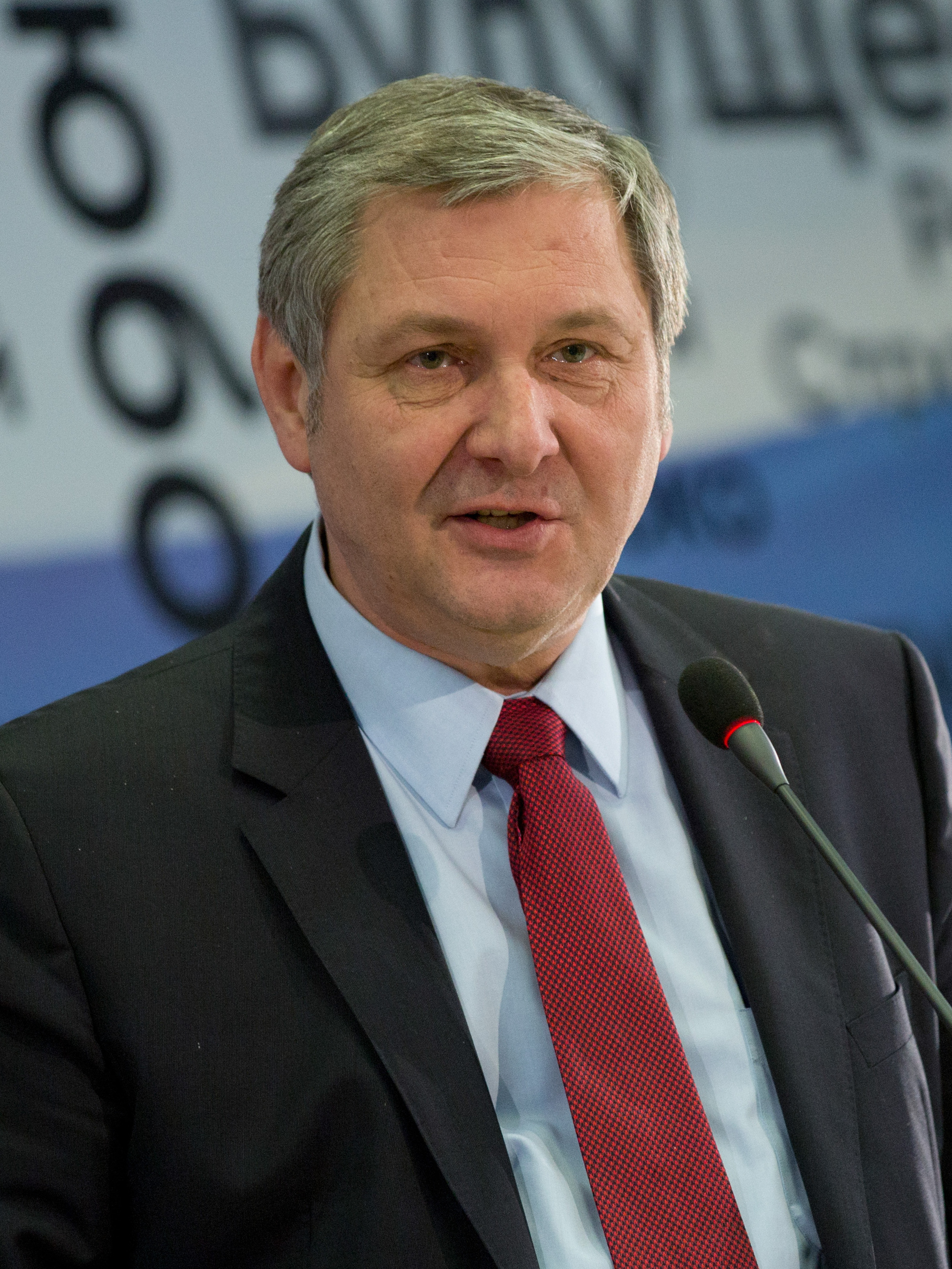
Sergey Ivanenko

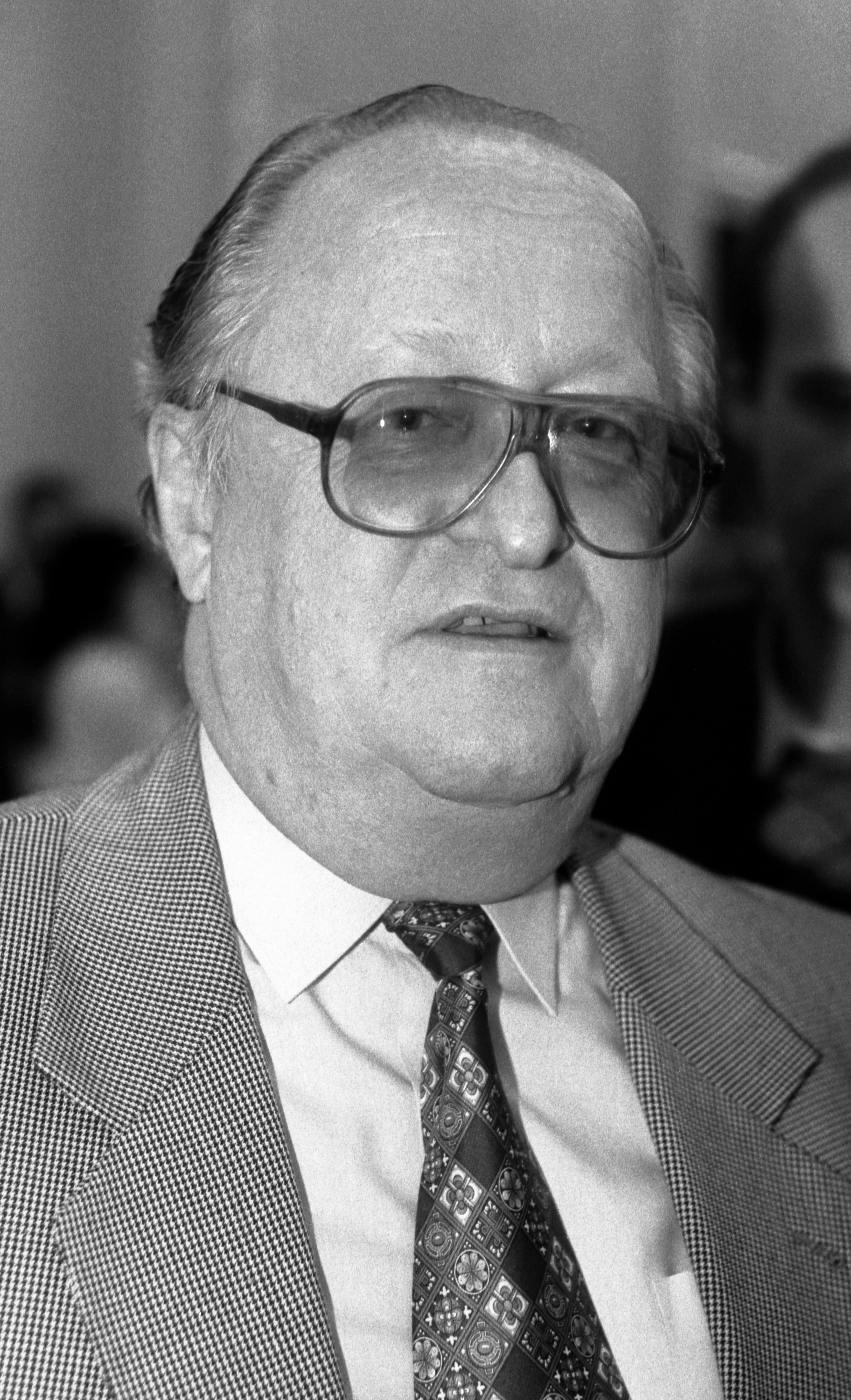
Viktor Gerashchenko

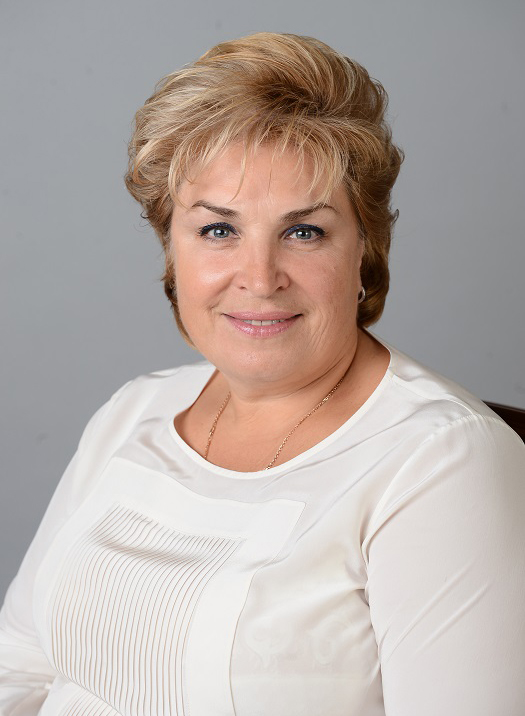
Tatyana Nesterenko

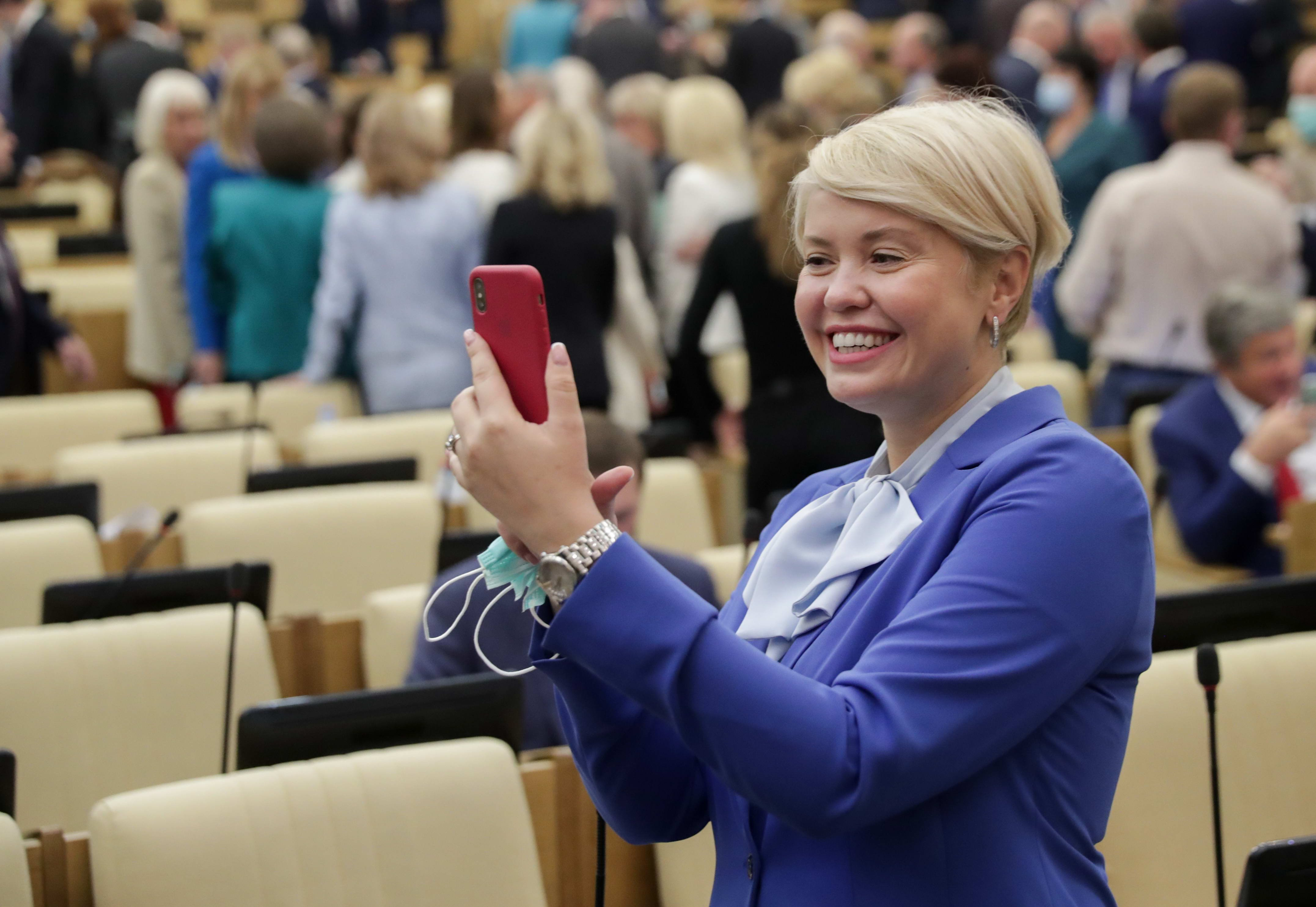
Yekaterina Kharchenko

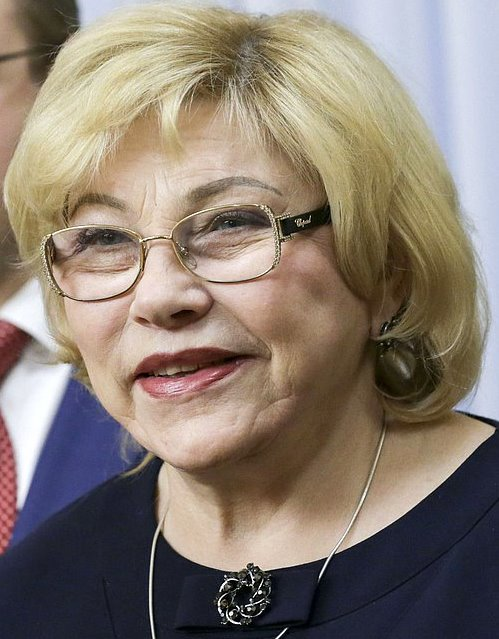
Yelena Drapeko

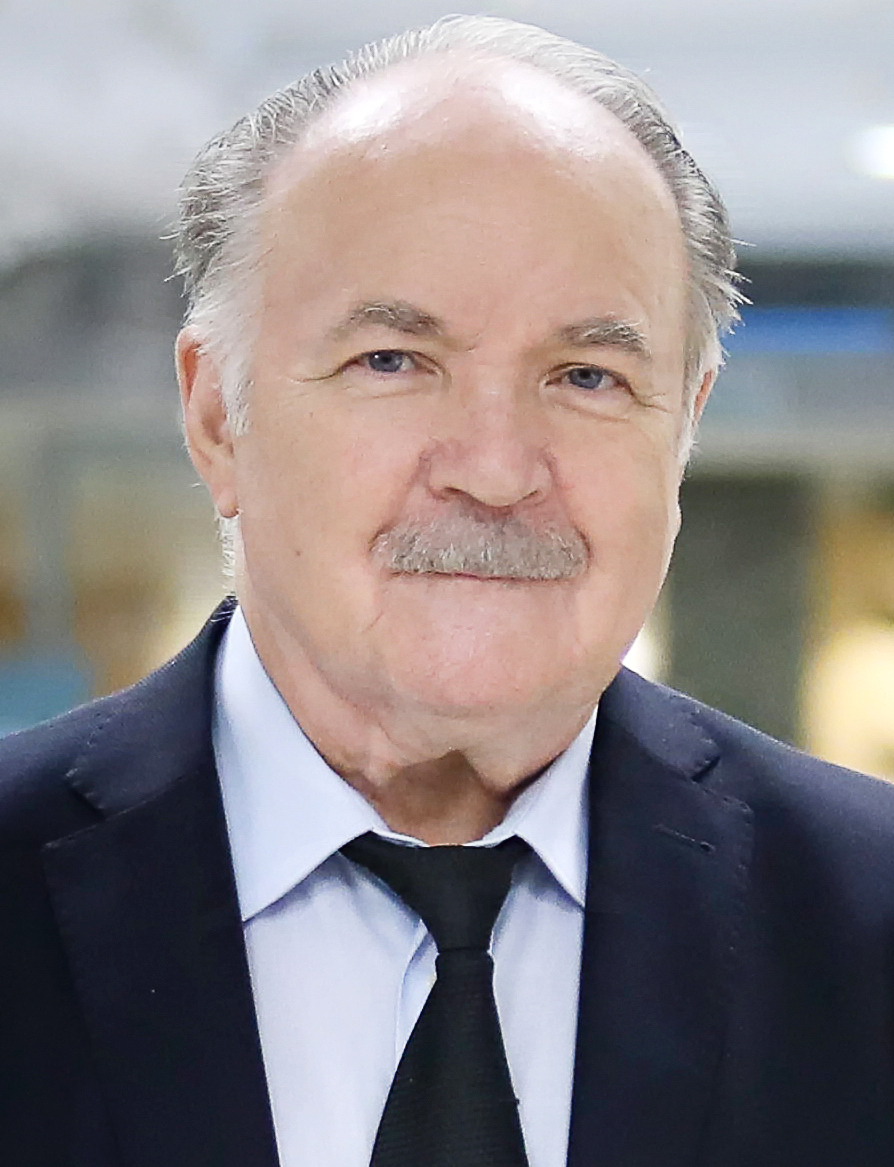
Nikolai Gubenko

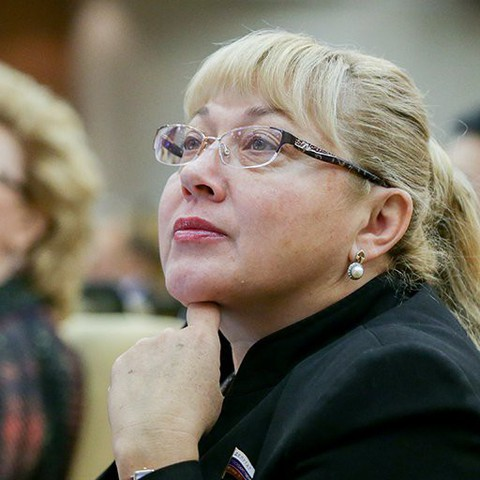
Svetlana Savchenko

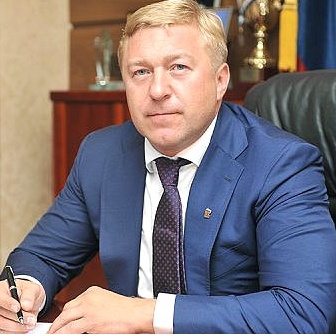
Alexander Yaroshuk

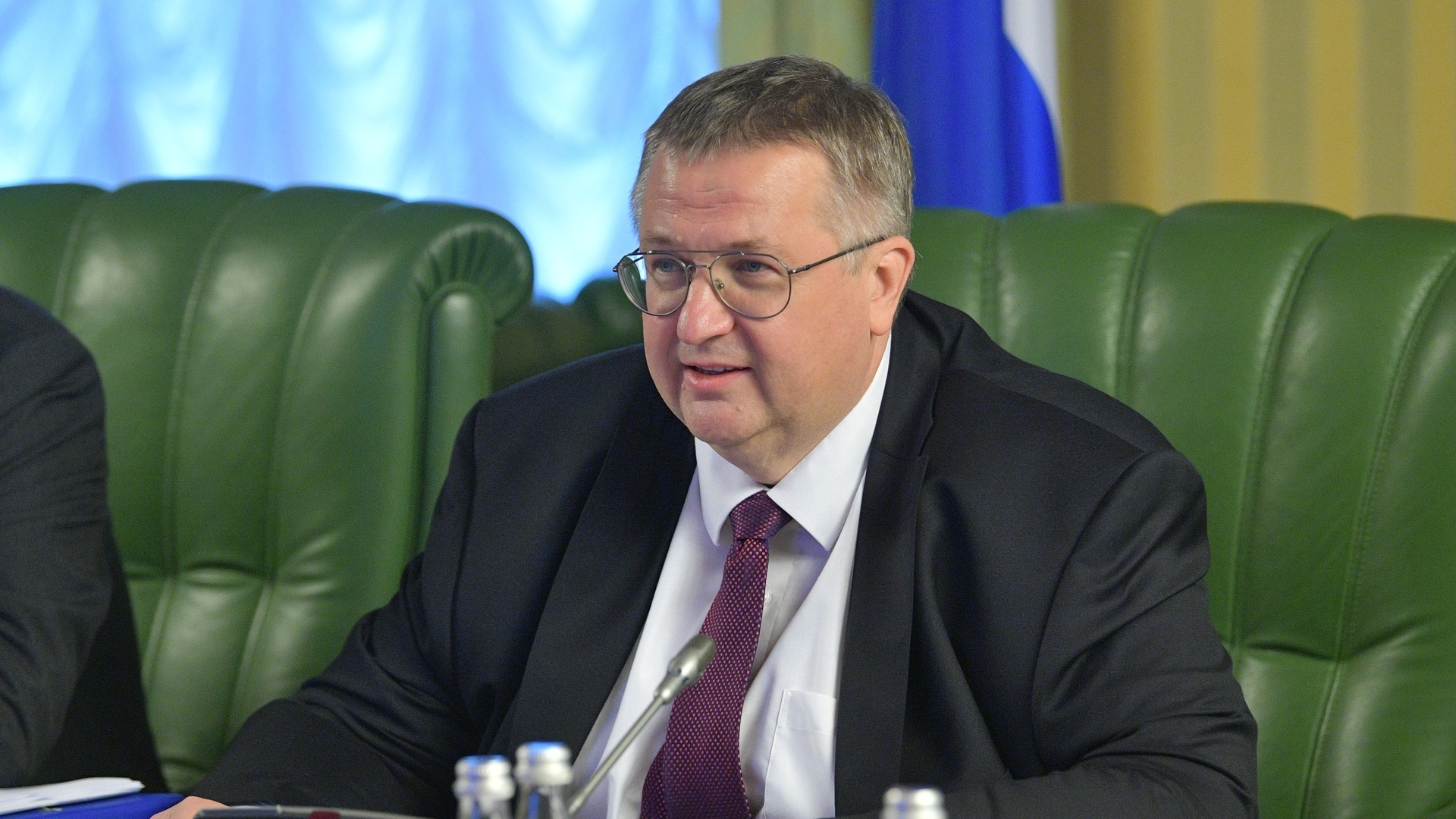
Alexey Overchuk

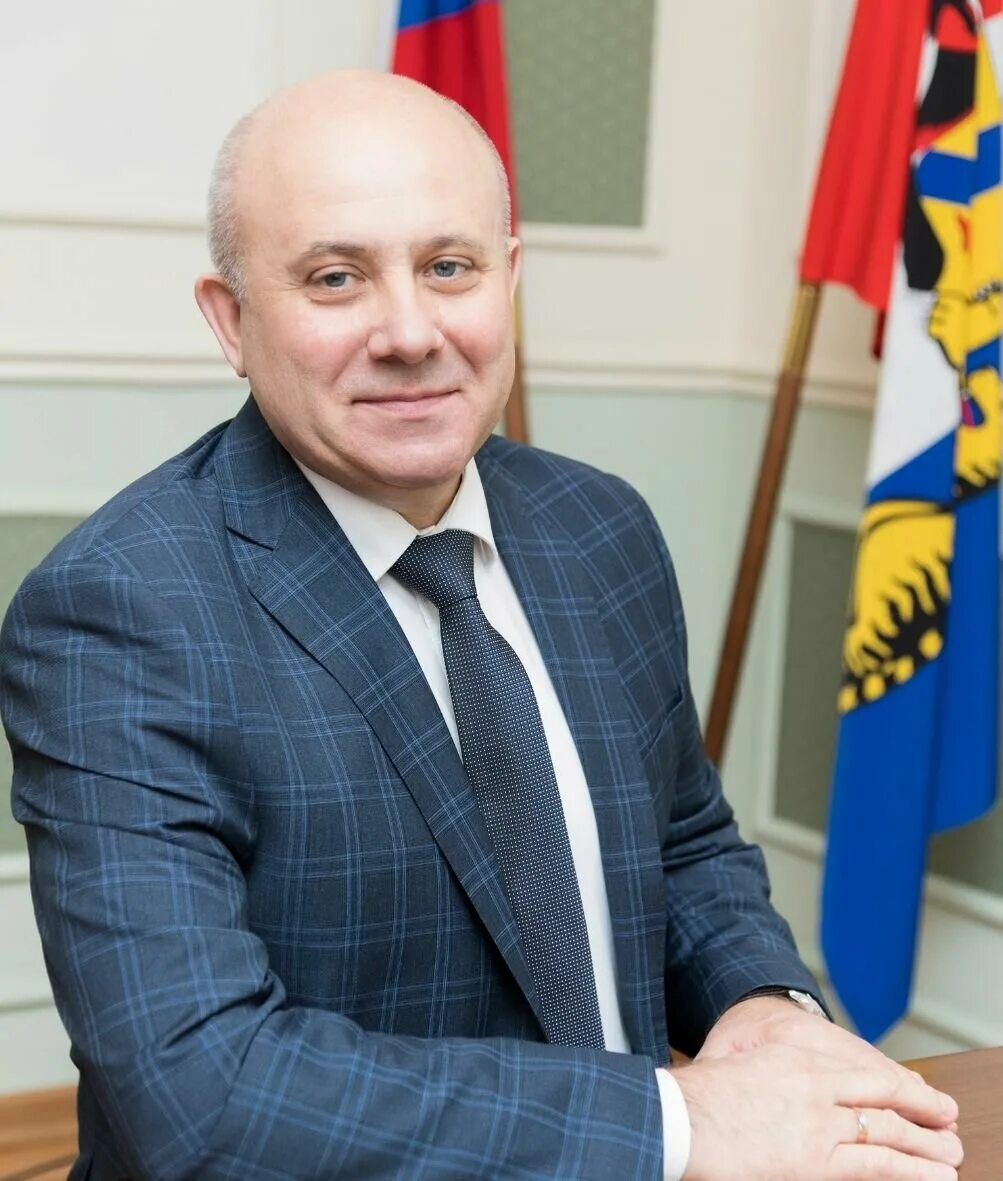
Sergey Kravchuk

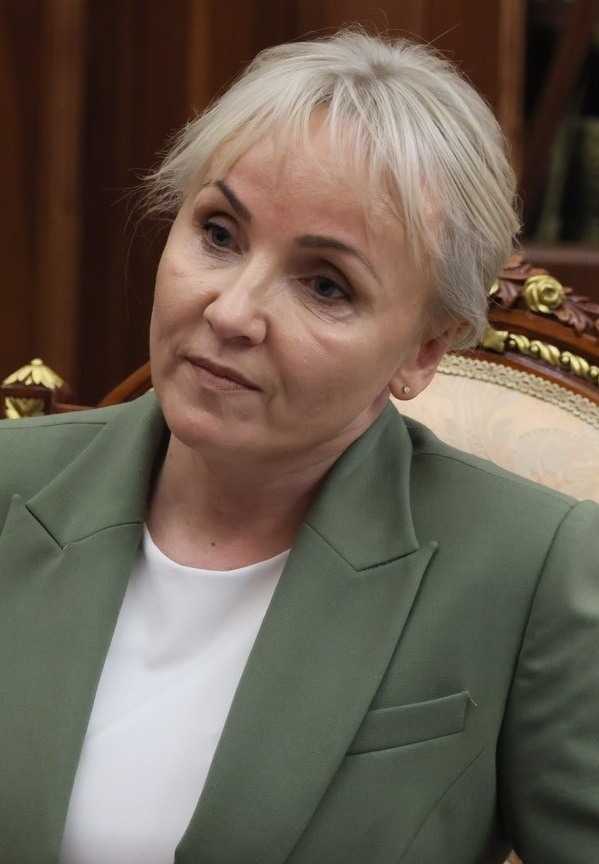
Maria Kostyuk

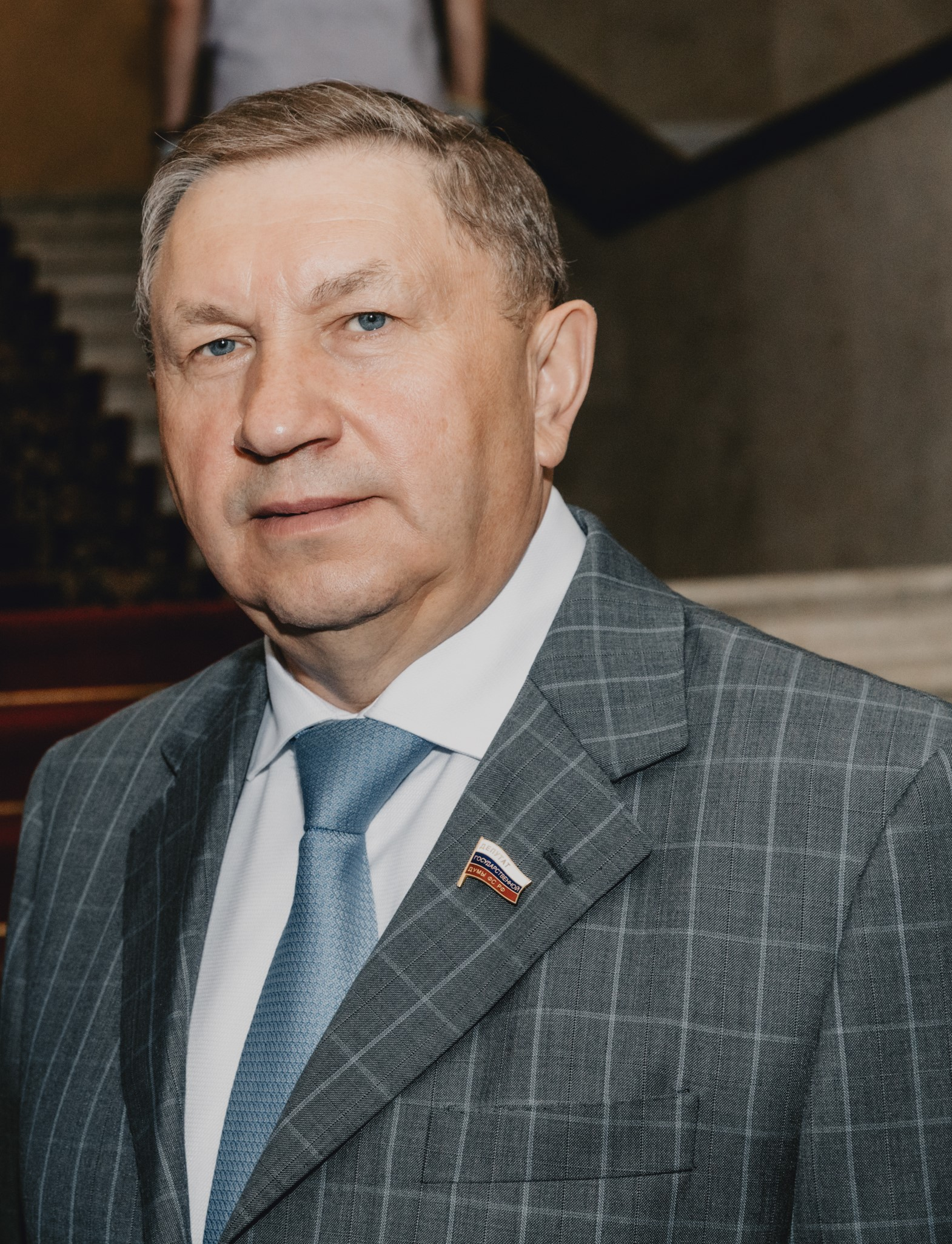
Sergey Yakhnyuk

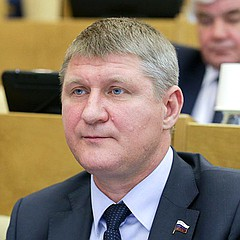
Mikhail Sheremet

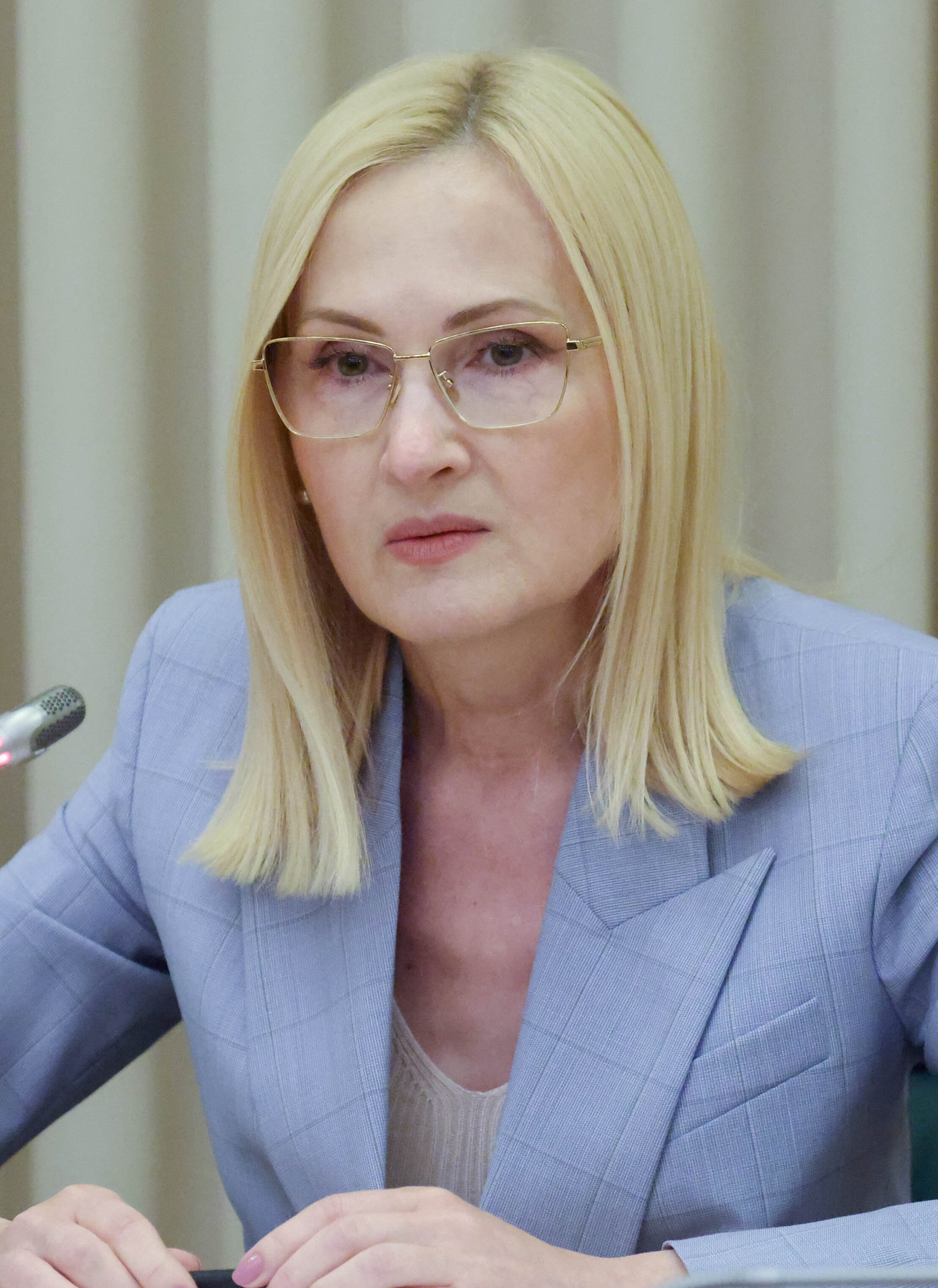
Irina Yarovaya

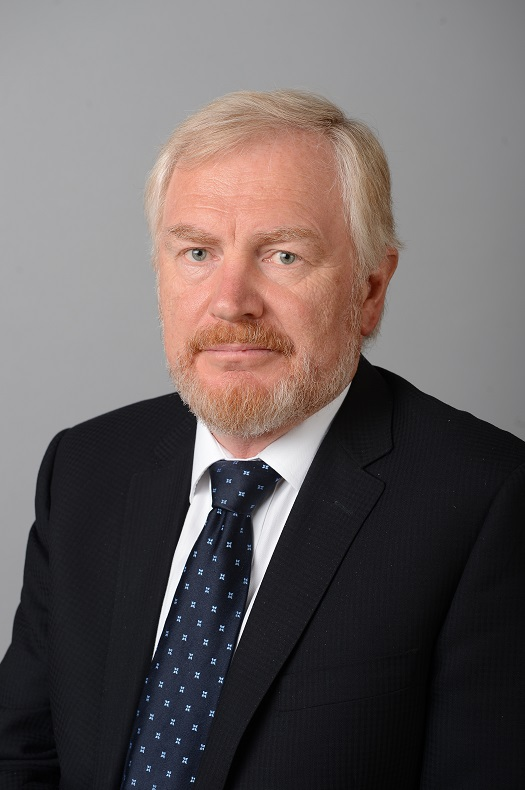
Sergei Storchak

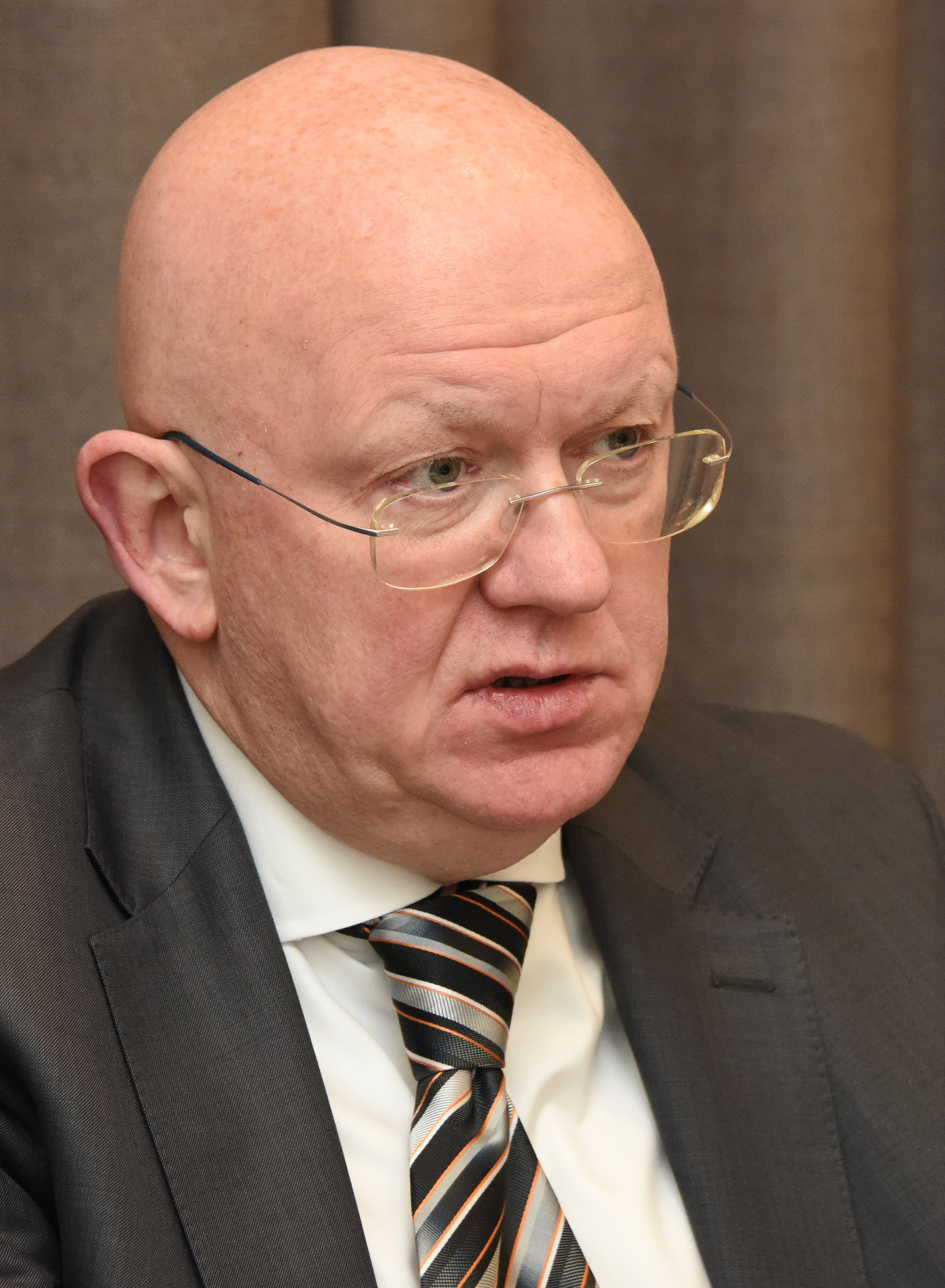
Vasily Nebenzya

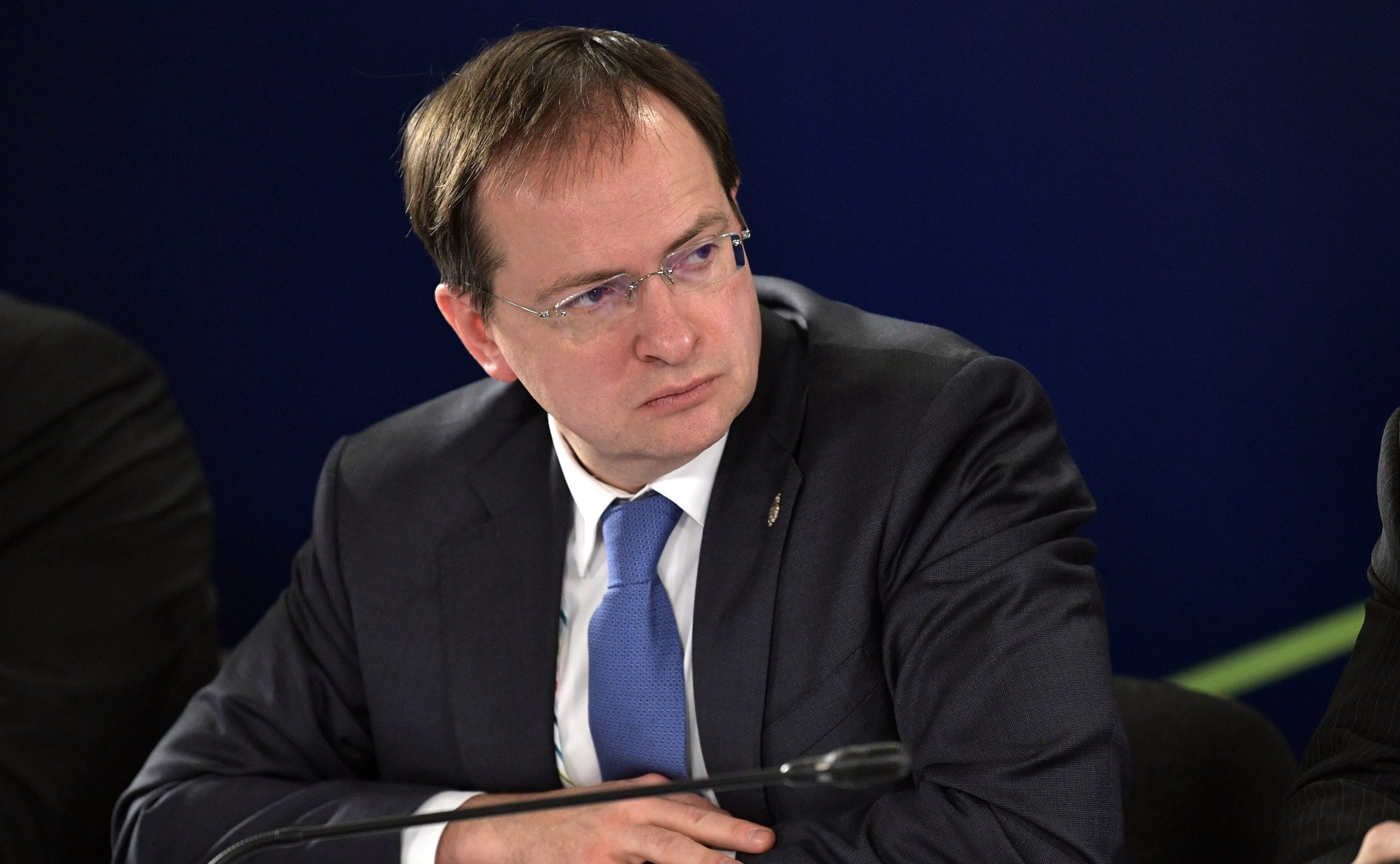
Vladimir Medinsky

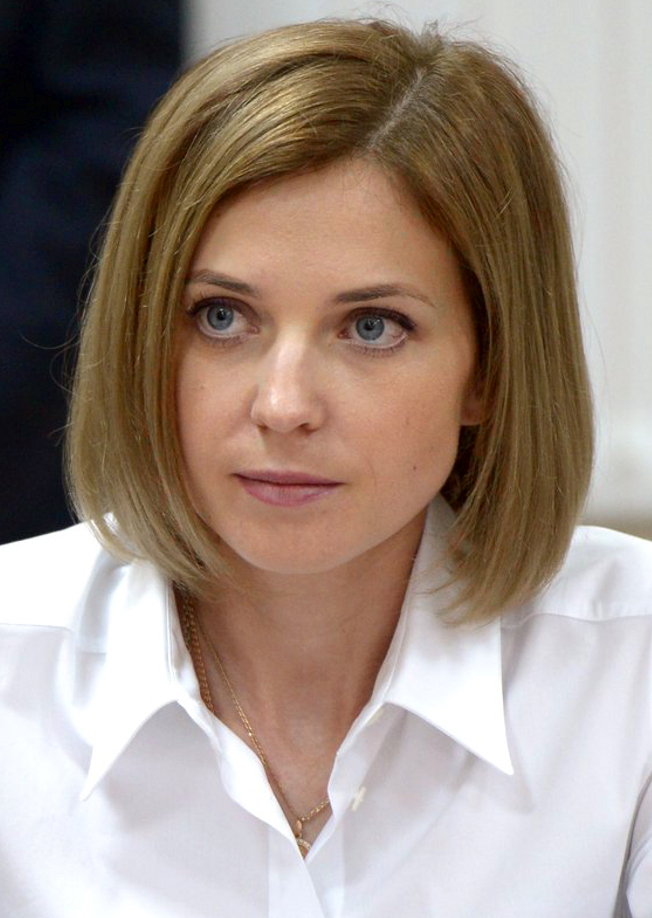
Natalia Poklonskaya

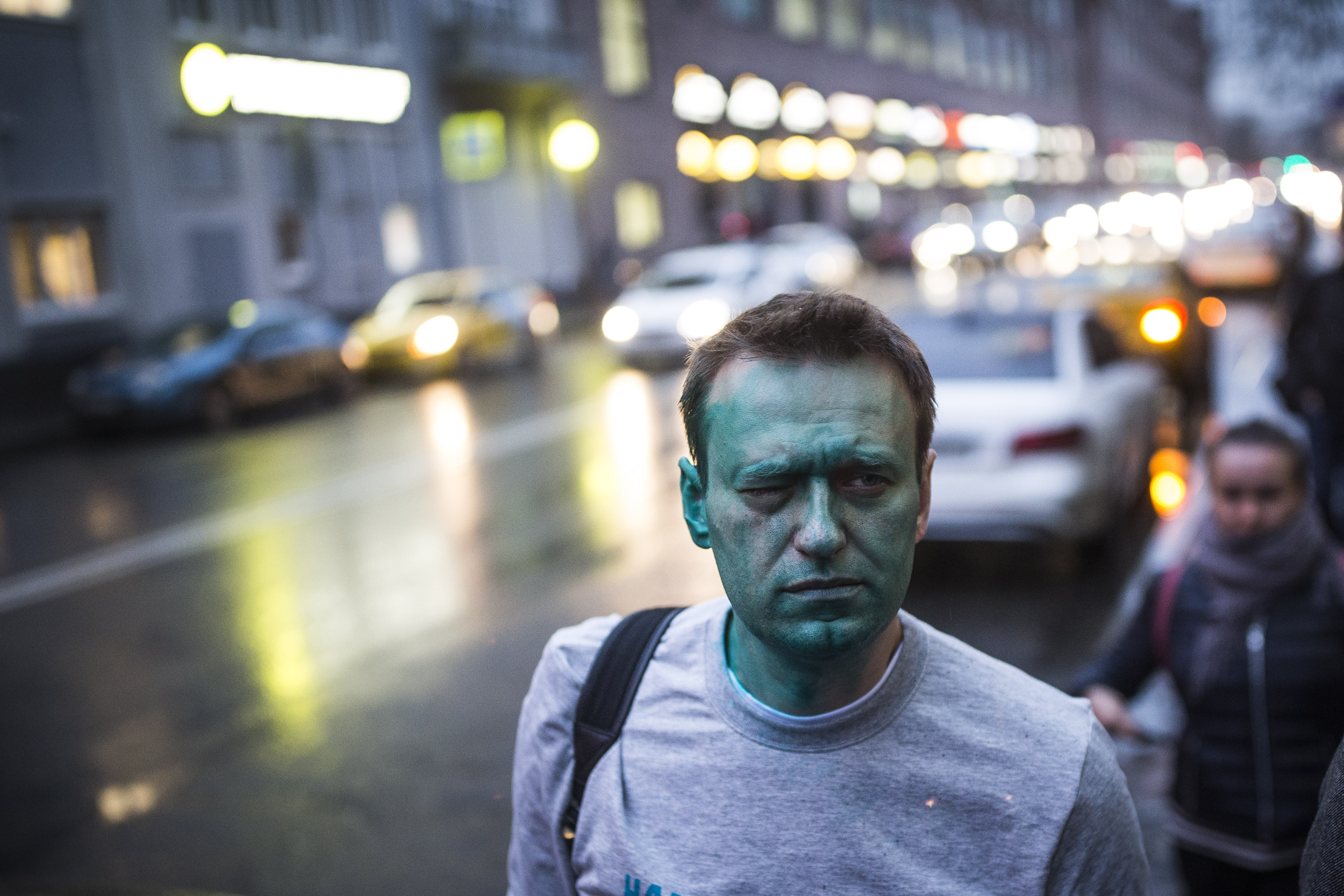
Alexei Navalny

- Viktoria Abramchenko – Deputy Prime Minister of the Russian Federation with responsibility for Agro-Industrial Complex, Natural Resources and Ecology
- Nikolay Aksyonenko – First Deputy Prime Minister of Russia (21 May 1999 – 10 January 2000)
- Alexander Aksyonenko – Member of the State Duma for Novosibirsk Oblast
- Sergey Aleksashenko – economist and former government official. He was the deputy finance minister and first deputy chairman of the board of the Central Bank of Russia from 1995 to 1998
- Mikhail Alekseyenko – member of the State Duma of the Russian Empire of 3rd and 4th convocations (by the list from the Union of October 17)
- Andrey Alekseyenko – politician and economist who served as mayor of Krasnodar from 2021 to 2022
- Nikolay Alexeyenko – deputy of the 8th State Duma convocation
- Alexander Ananchenko – senator
- Andrey Andreychenko – member of the State Duma of the VII convocation between 31 May 2017 and 12 October 2021, and a member of the Legislative Assembly of Primorsky Krai of the VI convocation from 18 September 2016 to 24 May 2017.
- Vladimir Antonov-Ovseyenko – Bolshevik leader and diplomat, a leader of the October Revolution
- Igor Antropenko – political figure, deputy of the 8th State Duma convocation
- Vladimir Babenko – first head of administration of Tambov Oblast 1991–1995
- Vsevolod Balitsky – Soviet official, commissar of State Security 1st Class (equivalent to four-star general) of the NKVD, member of the Central Committee of the Communist Party of the Soviet Union
- Konstantin Basyuk – senator
- Vasiliy Bebko – ambassador of the USSR and later Russia to Liberia 1987–1992
- Igor Belchuk – politician and businessman who served as acting governor of Primorsky Krai in spring 2001
- Stepan Petrovich Beletsky – senator in the State Council of Russian Empire
- Dmitry Belik – politician, current member of parliament in the State Duma of the VII convocation, member of the United Russia party, and member of the State Duma committee on control and regulations
- Alexander Bezborodko – grand chancellor of Russian Empire and chief architect of Catherine the Great's foreign policy
- Sergey Bidonko – deputy of the 7th and 8th State Duma convocations
- Anastasia Bitsenko (Kameristaya) – revolutionary
- Gleb Bokii – Bolshevik revolutionary, headed the "special department" of the Soviet secret police apparatus, believed to have been in charge of the Soviet Union's concentration camp system
- Nikolai Bondarenko – opposition politician and blogger, member of the Saratov Oblast Duma for the Communist Party
- Nikolai Bondarenko (politician, born 1958) - member of the Legislative Assembly of Saint Petersburg since 29 September 2021
- Yelena Bondarenko (Russian politician) – Member of the State Duma for Stavropol Krai
- Roman Boyko – chairperson of the Legislative Assembly of the Jewish Autonomous Oblast of the Russian Federation
- Anatoly Brovko – Russian politician who served as the governor of Volgograd Oblast
- Konstantin Chernenko (1911–1985) – leader of Soviet Union (1984–1985)
- Dmitry Chernyshenko – businessman, deputy prime minister of Russia for Tourism, Sport, Culture and Communications since 2020
- Stepan Chervonenko – Soviet ambassador to Peking
- Vladimir Chub – governor of Rostov Oblast in Russia 1991–2010
- Vlas Chubar – finance minister of the Soviet Union (1937–1938)
- Konstantin Chuychenko – politician, businessman, and lawyer; minister of justice since 21 January 2020
- Alexander Danieliuk-Stefanski – member of the Russian Social Democratic Labor Party
- Ivan Demchenko – deputy of the 5th, 6th, 7th, and 8th State Dumas
- Nikolai Demchenko – the first deputy commissar of agriculture of the USSR, People's Commissar of Grain and Livestock Farms of the USSR
- Andrii Derkach – member of the Russian Federation Council, former member of Verkhovna Rada (1998–2020)
- Alexei Didenko – deputy of the Tomsk Oblast Duma
- Alexey Dmitrienko – senator from Penza Oblast (2016–2020)
- Dmitry Dmitriyenko – former governor of Murmansk
- Nikolai Doluda – political figure, deputy of the 8th State Duma
- Andrey Doroshenko – deputy of the 8th State Duma
- Alexander Dovgopol – head of the Perovo District (2013–2017)
- Yelena Drapeko – actress and member of the State Duma for Saint Petersburg
- Aleksandr Drozdenko – economist, governor of Leningrad Oblast since 2012
- Peter P. Dubrovsky – bibliophile, diplomat, paleographer, secretary of the Russian Embassy in France, collector of manuscripts and books
- Vladimir Dyachenko – head of administration of Amur Oblast (1994–1996 )
- Pavel Dybenko – Bolshevik revolutionary, a leader of the October Revolution
- Vitaly Fedorchuk – KGB officer and Minister of Interior Affairs of the Soviet Union
- Alexander Filipenko – politician, former governor of Khanty-Mansi Autonomous Okrug
- Andrei Fursenko – minister of education and science of the Russian Federation (2004–2012)
- Aleksandr Gamanenko – member of the Communist Party of the Russian Federation
- Viktor Gerashchenko – chairman of the State Bank of the USSR, governor of the Bank of Russia during much of the Perestroika and post-Perestroika periods
- Nikolai Gerasimenko – member of the 2nd, 3rd, 4th, 5th, 6th, and 7th State Dumas between 1995–2021, and the Chair of State Duma Healthcare and Sports committee (1995–2003)
- Nikolay Gikalo – Soviet revolutionary and statesman
- Andrey Golovatyuk – member for the LDPR of the State Duma of Russia
- Nikolai Golushko – KGB officer, director of the Federal Service of Counter-intelligence of the Russian Federation
- Andrey Goncharenko – Russian billionaire businessman
- Leonid Gorbenko – 2nd governor of Kaliningrad Oblast (1996–2000)
- Yury Gotsanyuk – prime minister of Crimea since 2019
- Igor Gouzenko – cipher clerk for the Soviet embassy to Canada in Ottawa, Ontario
- Dmitry Grigorenko – deputy prime minister of the Russian Federation, chief of the Government Staff since 2020
- Grigory Grinko – finance minister of the Soviet Union (1930–1937)
- Evgeny Gromyko – senator from Krasnodar Krai (2014–2015)
- Alexander Grushko – diplomat, deputy minister of foreign affairs since 2018, permanent representative of Russia to NATO 2012–2018
- Vladimir Gurko – government official, member of the Russian Assembly
- Andriy Hirenko – secretary of the Communist Party of the Soviet Union (1989–1991)
- Yurii Hlushko – public and political figure, an organizer of Ukrainian national cultural existence in Green Ukraine (Zelenyi Klyn)
- Leonid Hrach – member of Communists of Russia party
- Vitaly Ignatenko – journalist and politician, head of ITAR-TASS news agency (1993–2012), deputy prime minister in the cabinet of Prime Minister Viktor Chernomyrdin (1995–1997)
- Kirill Ilyashenko – member of the Supreme Soviet of the Soviet Union (1966–1974)
- Mikhail Iovchuk – deputy head of the Propaganda and Agitation Department of the Central Committee of the CPSU (B) (1944–1947)
- Andrey Ishchenko – member of parliament in the Legislative Assembly of Primorsky Krai
- Sergey Ivanenko – economist and politician
- Vladimir Ivashko – Soviet politician, briefly general secretary of the Communist Party of the Soviet Union, deputy general secretary of the Communist Party of the Soviet Union (1990–1991)
- Pyotr Kapnist – Russian Imperial diplomat and ambassador to Austria (1895–1904)
- Aleksandr Kapto – Russian ambassador to North Korea (1990–1992)
- Ivan Kazanets – minister of ferrous metallurgy of the Soviet Union
- Alexey Kazannik – deputy governor of Omsk Oblast (1995–2003)
- Yekaterina Kharchenko – deputy of the 8th State Duma
- Lev Khinchuk – member of the Menshevik faction of the Russian Social Democratic Labour Party (RSDLP) until 1919, when he applied for membership of the Russian Communist Party (Bolshevik)
- Gleb Khor – deputy of the 4th, 5th, 6th, 7th, and 8th State Dumas
- Vitaliy Khotsenko – acting governor of Omsk Oblast since 2023
- Viktor Khristenko – chairman of the board of the Eurasian Economic Commission (2012–2016); first deputy prime minister of Russia (1999–2000); minister of industry (2004–2012)
- Taras Khtey – senator of Belgorod Oblast
- Alexei Kirichenko – Second Secretary of the Communist Party of the Soviet Union (17 December 1957 – 5 April 1960)
- Stepan Kirichuk – politician and former railway worker who has been a member of the Tyumen City Duma since 9 September 2018
- Sergey Kiriyenko (half Ukrainian) – Prime Minister of Russia
- Vadim Kirpichenko – Head of the First Chief Directorate of the KGB (October 1, 1988 – February 6, 1989)
- Sergey Kislyak – Russia's Ambassador to the United States (2008–2017)
- Mikhail Kislyuk – politician who had last served as the 1st Governor of Kemerovo Oblast from 1991 to 1997
- Vadym Kolesnichenko - Rodina (political party) member
- Viktor Kochubey – Russian statesman and a close aide of Alexander I of Russia
- Ivan Kodatsky – member of the Presidium of the All-Russian Central Executive Committee and a member of the Central Executive Committee of the Soviet Union
- Alexandra Kollontai – revolutionary, politician, diplomat and Marxist theoretician. Serving as the People's Commissar for Welfare in 1917–1918, she was the first woman in history to become an official member of a governing cabinet.
- Aleksey Kondratenko – politician serving as a senator from Krasnodar Krai since 22 September 2015
- Nikolai Kondratenko – politician, long time Governor of Krasnodar Krai, runner-up candidate of the Communist Party (CPRF) in 2003
- Nikolay Kondratyuk (politician) – Senator of the executive authority of Penza Oblast since 21 December 2021
- Alexey Kornienko (politician) – political figure and a deputy of the 5th, 6th, 7th, and 8th State Dumas
- Georgy Korniyenko – Soviet diplomat, attaché at the Soviet Embassy in Washington, D.C. during the 1962 Cuban Missile Crisis
- Leonid Korniyets – Soviet politician
- Natalya Kostenko – political figure and deputy of the 7th and 8th State Dumas
- Maria Kostyuk – governor of Jewish Autonomous Oblast since September 2025
- Yuriy Kotsiubynsky – Bolshevik politician
- Yegor Kovalchuk – acting governor of Bryansk Oblast since 13 May 2026
- Boris Kovalchuk – official who has served as Chairman of the Accounts Chamber of Russia since 2024
- Vyacheslav Kovalenko – diplomat
- Yegor Kovalevsky – Russian Imperial Diplomat
- Lev Kovpak – political figure and deputy of the 7th and 8th State Dumas
- Dmitry Kozak, the Deputy Prime Minister of Russia from 2008 to 2020, Deputy Kremlin Chief of Staff
- Andrey Kozenko – deputy of the State Duma of the 7th convocation between 2016 and 2021
- Oleg Kozhemyako – the Governor of Primorsky Krai since 2018. Previously he was the Governor of Sakhalin Oblast, Russia.
- Grigory Kozitsky – Cabinet Secretary of Catherine II
- Denis Kravchenko – deputy of the 8th State Duma
- Vladimir Kravchenko (politician) – politician serving as a senator from Tomsk Oblast since 14 October 2021
- Sergey Kravchuk – politician who is currently the third mayor of Khabarovsk since 25 September 20
- Albert Krivchenko- political figure who served as the 1st Governor of Amur Oblast
- Sergey Krivenko – journalist, publicist, and editor
- Mikhail Krivoshlyk – Russian Imperial State Councillor
- Ruslan Kukharuk – acting governor of Khanty–Mansi Autonomous Okrug since 30 May 2024
- Dmitry Kursky – Prosecutor General of the Russian SFSR (1922–1928)
- Tatiana Kusayko – member of the Federation Council between 2016 and 2021 and deputy of the 8th State Duma since 2021
- Alexander Kushelev-Bezborodko – Imperial nobleman and politician
- Aleksey Lavrinenko – deputy of the 7th and 8th State Dumas
- Aleksey Lebed – 2nd Head of the Republic of Khakassia (8 January 1997 – 14 January 2009)
- Dmitry Leshchenko – revolutionary, Old Bolshevik, professor and one of the founders and first organizers of Soviet Cinema who served as first head of the All-Russian Photo and Cinematographic Department of the People's Commissariat for Education
- Sergey Levchenko – politician and member of the 8th State Duma
- Valery Limarenko – current Governor of Sakhalin Oblast, a federal subject of Russia from 2018
- Vladimir Litvinenko – academic, businessman and Vladimir Putin's campaign manager
- Olga Litvinenko – member of the Legislative Assembly of Saint Petersburg from 2007 to 2011
- Tatiana Lobach – deputy of the 8th State Duma
- Pyotr Lomako – minister of non-ferrous metallurgy (1965–1986)
- Konstantin Lubenchenko – last chairman of the Soviet of the Union, the lower chamber of the Supreme Soviet of the USSR, in 1991 and 1992
- Yury Lyashko – statesman, served as the 5th governor of the Amur Oblast 1996–1997, served as the 1st mayor of Blagoveshchensk 1991–1996
- Anatoly Makarenko – member of the Supreme Soviet of the RSFSR (1986–1988)
- Nikolay Maksyuta – governor of Volgograd Oblast from 1997 to 2010
- Yakov Malik – Soviet diplomat, Soviet ambassador to the United Kingdom, known for giving the USSR justifications for the occupation of Czechoslovakia at the Security Council in August 1968
- Vladislav Malkevich (economist) – general director of Expocentre ZAO (2002–2012), member of the board of directors of Global Association of Exhibition Industry (2003), vice president of Russian Union of Exhibitions and Fairs (2003), member of the International Academy of Business (2001), member of the International Academy of Creative Endeavors (1999)
- Yevgeny Marchenko (politician) – deputy of the 7th and 8th State Dumas
- Pyotr Marchenko – politician, deputy of the Stavropol Krai Duma, chairman of the Stavropol Krai Duma committee on security, inter-parliamentary relations, veteran organizations and the Cossacks 2011–2021
- Vladimir Matskevich – deputy chairman of the Soviet Council of Ministers; ambassador of the Soviet Union to Czechoslovakia
- Vladimir Medinsky – Russia's minister of culture (2012–2020), Chief Negotiator with Ukraine who currently serves as an Aide to President Vladimir Putin
- Oleg Melnichenko – chairman of the Federation Council Committee on Federal Structure, Regional Policy, Local Self-Government and Northern Affairs
- Sergey Menyaylo – head of the Republic of North Ossetia since 9 April 2021
- Ilya Mikhalchuk – politician, head of the East-Siberian Construction Company representing the interests of the SU-155 Group of companies in Siberia
- Maksim Mishchenko – politician, deputy of the State Duma, founder and leader of the youth movement Young Russia
- Vitaly Mukha – politician, served as the 1st and third Governor of Novosibirsk Oblast 1991–1993 and 1995–2000
- Galina Munzuk – politician, senator from Tuva 2011–2014
- Vsevolod Murakhovsky – first deputy premier of the Soviet Union during the Gorbachev Era
- Mikhail Murashko – physician and a politician, minister of health of the Russian Federation since 21 January 2020
- Vitaly Mutko – politician, deputy prime minister of Russia 2016–2020
- Filipp Naumenko – politician, mayor of Reutov 2023–2025
- Alexei Navalny – Russian opposition leader, lawyer, and anti-corruption activist
- Natalya Narochnitskaya - member of several minor political parties in Russia, including Constitutional Democratic Party and Derzhava
- Aleksandr Nazarchuk – minister of agriculture of Russia (1994–1996)
- Vitaly Nazarenko – politician serving as a senator from North Ossetia–Alania since 25 September 2018
- Yevgeny Nazdratenko – 2nd governor of Primorsky Krai
- Vasily Nebenzya – diplomat, current permanent representative of Russia to the United Nations
- Yury Nesterenko – member of the State Duma since 10 September 2023
- Tatyana Nesterenko – first deputy minister of Finance in 2012–2021
- Ivan Nikitchuk – member of the Communist Party of the Russian Federation, served in the State Duma from 1995 to 2003 and again from 2011 to 2016
- Yury Nimchenko – military officer and politician serving as the senator from Crimea since 12 September 2024
- Yuri Nosenko – KGB officer who defected to US
- Ivan Nosenko – People's Commissar for Shipbuilding of the USSR
- Alexander Novak – Deputy Prime Minister of Russia since 2020
- Dmitry Odinets – Russian Empire politician
- Nikolay Olshansky – senator from Voronezh Oblast from 2011 to 2013
- Gennadiy Onishchenko – government official who was the Chief Sanitary Inspector of Russia from 1996 to 2013
- Larisa Opanasyuk – lawyer and politician
- Alexey Overchuk – politician serving as Deputy Prime Minister of the Russian Federation from 21 January 2020
- Pavel Palazhchenko – former high-level Soviet conference interpreter who was the chief English interpreter for Mikhail Gorbachev and Soviet foreign minister Eduard Shevardnadze from 1985 and 1991
- Irina Panchenko – politician and former Member of the State Duma from Chukotka Autonomous Okrug (2003–2007)
- Igor Panchenko – politician who served as a senator from Tula Oblast from 14 October 2021 until his death
- Valentina Petrenko – Senator from Khakassia from 2001 to 2011
- Stepan Petrichenko – anarcho-syndicalist politician, de facto leader of the Kronstadt Commune, and the leader of the revolutionary committee which led the Kronstadt rebellion of 1921
- Grigory Petrovsky – Old Bolshevik, participated in signing the Treaty on the Creation of the USSR, one of the officials responsible for implementing Stalin's policies such as collectivization.
- Olga Pilipenko – deputy of the 7th and 8th State Dumas
- Nikolai Podgorny, Chairman of the Presidium of the Supreme Soviet of the USSR (1965–1977)
- Nikolai Podvoisky – Bolshevik revolutionary and Soviet statesman, one of the leaders of the October Revolution
- Natalia Poklonskaya – politician, diplomat, serving as deputy head of Rossotrudnichestvo since 2 February 2022
- Georgy Poltavchenko – former governor of Saint Petersburg
- Viktor Polyanichko – Soviet and Russian diplomat and politician, a people's deputy of the USSR, a people's deputy of the Azerbaijan SSR, a deputy of the Chelyabinsk Regional Council of Workers' Deputies, and a delegate of the 23rd Congress of the Communist Party of the Soviet Union
- Dmitry Polyansky – Soviet-Russian statesman who was First Deputy Chairman of the Council of Ministers of the Soviet Union from 1965 to 1973. From 1958 to 1962 he was Chairman of the Council of Ministers of the Russian SFSR, equivalent to a Premier in of one of the 15 Soviet Socialist Republics that comprised the Soviet Union.
- Valery Potapenko – 5th governor (head) of Nenets Autonomous Okrug from 2006 to 2009
- Sergei Prikhodko – First Deputy Head of the Russian Government Office (19 May 2018 – 26 January 2021)
- Alexander Prokopchuk – employee of the internal affairs agencies, head of the Ministry of Internal Affairs of the Russian Federation National Central Bureau of Interpol from 14 June 2011, and vice-president of Interpol from 10 November 2016
- Mikhail Prusak – governor of Novgorod Oblast 1991–2007
- Pyotr Rachkovsky – chief of the Okhrana, the secret police of the Russian Empire
- Valeriy Raenko – Chairman of the Legislative Assembly of Kamchatka Krai (2011–2021)
- Alexey Razumovsky – Acting Chamberlain (1775), Senator (1776–1807), Minister of Public Education (1810–1816). Active Privy Councillor (1807)
- Andrey Razumovsky – Russian Imperial diplomat who spent many years of his life in Vienna
- Yevgeny Revenko – deputy of the 7th State and 8th State Duma
- Mikhail Rodzianko – chamberlain of the Imperial family, Chairman of the State Duma and one of the leaders of the February Revolution of 1917
- Leonid Roketsky – 2nd governor of Tyumen Oblast (1993–2001), First Deputy Head of Administration of the Tyumen Oblast (November 1991 – 12 January 1993)
- Andrey Rostenko – former Mayor of Yalta
- Elena Rozmirovich – revolutionary and politician and later an official in the Soviet Union
- Valentina Rudchenko – current speaker of the Duma of Chukotka Autonomous Okrug
- Vladimir Rushailo – minister of internal affairs (1999–2001)
- Anastasia Rybachenko – member of the Political Council, head of the Youth Committee, spokesperson with the Moscow branch of the "Solidarnost" movement 2008–2012
- Nikolay Ryabushenko - member of the Altai Krai Legislative Assembly (2004–2008)
- Oleg Savchenko – politician and businessman who had served as the second Governor of Kaluga Oblast in 1996
- Oleg Savchenko – deputy of the 4th, 5th, 6th, and 8th State Dumas
- Svetlana Savchenko – member of parliament of the State Duma of the VII convocation, as a member of the State Duma Committee on Culture from 5 October 2016 to 12 October 2021
- Yevgeny Savchenko – senator of Belgorod Oblast on legislative authority
- Ivan Savchenko – Soviet KGB general
- Yury Savenko – 3rd Mayor of Kaliningrad (11 November 1998 – 7 November 2007)
- Nikolai Semashko – Russian politician, Minister of Health of Soviet Union
- Zinovie Serdiuk – Deputy of the Supreme Soviet of the USSR, First Secretary of the Moldavian Communist Party
- Semyon Sereda – Peoples's Commissar for Agriculture of Soviet Russia
- Ilya Seredyuk – Governor of Kemerovo Oblast since 15 May 2024
- Vasily Shakhrai – political activist and Bolshevik revolutionary during the Russian Revolution, founder of what came to be called National Communism
- Sergey Shakhray – co-author of the Constitution of the Russian Federation
- Nadezhda Shaydenko – member of United Russia, she served in the State Duma from 2011 to 2016, Deputy Chairman of the State Duma Committee on Education, Corresponding Member of the Russian Academy of Education (2011)
- Efim Shchadenko – Soviet colonel general who served as Deputy People's Commissar of Defense during the early years of World War II
- Grigoriy Shcherbina – Russian Imperial diplomat
- Boris Shcherbina, a Soviet politician who served as a vice-chairman of the Council of Ministers from 1984 to 1989.Supervisor of Soviet crisis management during 1986 Chernobyl disaster and the 1988 Armenian earthquake.
- Pyotr Shelest, Deputy Chairman of the Council of Ministers of the Soviet Union, Full member of the 22nd, 23rd, 24th Politburo.
- Mikhail Sheremet – member of the State Duma and a member of the State Duma Committee on Energy since 5 October 2016
- Andrey Shevchenko – senator of legislative authority of Orenburg Oblast in the Federation Council since 27 September 2016, and is the Chairman of the Federation Council Committee on the Federal Structure, Regional Policy, Local Self-Government and Affairs of the North
- Sergei Shmatko – Russia's Minister of Energy from May 2008 until May 2012
- Vladimir Shumeyko – 1st Chairman of the Federation Council, First Deputy Prime Minister
- Alexander Shumsky – deputy head of the mass agitation department of the Central Committee of All-Union Communist Party (Bolsheviks), a head of the Central Committee of Trade Union of Education officials, and a Presidium member of the All-Union Central Council of Trade Unions,rector of the Leningrad Institute of National Economy, Leningrad Polytechnic Institute
- Aleksandr Skorobogatko – billionaire businessman and former deputy member in the State Duma, having represented the Liberal Democratic Party of Russia (2003–2007) and United Russia (2007–2016)
- Sergey Smetanyuk – politician who lasted served as the acting Governor of Tyumen Oblast in November 2005, and the head of the Tyumen administration from 2005 to 2007
- Sergei Sobko- chairman of the Russian Christian-Social Movement and deputy of the State Duma representing the Communist Party of the Russian Federation
- Sergey Sokol – deputy of the 7th and 8th State Dumas
- Vladimir Starostenko – politician, statesman, economist, railway operator, and engineer who had served as the Head of the Moscow Railway from 2002 to 2009
- Sergei Storchak – politician who had former served as the a Deputy Finance Minister of Russia
- Vladimir Strelchenko -mayor of Khimki since 2005 to 2012
- Nikolay Sukhoy – member of the State Duma from 1993 to 2007
- Inna Svyatenko – politician, who serves as Russian Federation Senator from Moscow since 2019
- Andrey Tarasenko – politician and former army officer who is currently the Chairman of the Government of the Republic of Sakha (Yakutia) since 31 July 2020
- Mikhail Tarasenko – deputy of the 8th State Duma
- Vasily Tarasyuk – Deputy Chairman of the State Duma's Committee on Natural Resources and Utilization
- Valentin Tatarchuk – member of the Democratic Choice of Russia, he served in the State Duma from 1994 to 1996
- Valery Tereshchenko – diplomat and ambassador
- Mikhail Tereshchenko – minister of Foreign Affairs of the Russian Provisional Government (1917)
- Alexander Teterdinko – deputy of the 8th State Duma
- Vyacheslav Timchenko – politician serving as a senator from Kirov Oblast since 2014, currently serving on legislative authority as of 2016
- Vladimir Timoshenko – career diplomat, former ambassador of the Russian Federation to Benin
- Boris Tolpygo – Soviet Communist politician, chairman of the executive committee of Soviet of Lower Amur Oblast in 1936–1938
- Viktor Tomenko – statesman who is currently serving as the governor of Altai Krai since 17 September 2018
- Dmitry Troshchinsky – senior cabinet secretary (1793–98), Prosecutor General (1814–17), privy councilor, senator, owner of the serf theater
- Alexander Tsiurupa – Bolshevik leader, Soviet statesman, Vice Chairman and, later, Chief of food of Soviet Russia
- Valery Usatyuk – politician, current member of the Federation Council representing the executive branch of the Republic of Khakassia, and a member of the Federation Council Committee on Defense and Security from 2018–2023
- Oleg Valenchuk – deputy of the 5th, 6th, 7th, and 8th State Dumas
- Dmitry Vasilenko – politician serving as a senator from Leningrad Oblast since 7 October 2021
- Sergey Veremeenko – businessman and politician
- Nikolay Vinnichenko – federal state civilian service rank of 1st class Active State Councillor of the Russian Federation
- Feliks Volkhovsky – revolutionary
- Alexey Voyevoda - bobsledder, professional arm wrestler and politician
- Anatoly Vyborny – deputy of the 6th, 7th, and 8th State Dumas
- Vasily Yakemenko -politician, creator and leader of several pro-government youth groups
- Sergey Yakhnyuk – deputy of the 7th and 8th State Dumas
- Alexander Yakovenko – diplomat
- Alexander Yaroshuk – Russian Federation Senator from Kaliningrad Oblast
- Irina Yarovaya – Deputy Chairman of the State Duma from United Russia Party and a member of United Russia's General Council
- Vasily Yurchenko – Governor in Novosibirsk Oblast (2010–2014)
- Vitaly Yurchenko – KGB officer
- Alexander Yushchenko – deputy of the 6th, 7th, and 8th State Dumas
- Alexander Zasyadko – Soviet economic, state and party leader
- Volodymyr Zatonsky – Soviet politician, academic, Communist Party activist, full member of the Ukrainian SSR Academy of Sciences (from 1929) and Academy of Sciences of the Soviet Union (from 1936)
- Pyotr Zavadovsky – Russian Imperial statesman
- Yelena Zlenko – politician who is a member of the Federation Council from the executive authority of Yamalo-Nenets Autonomous Okrug since 2018

=== Cosmonauts ===
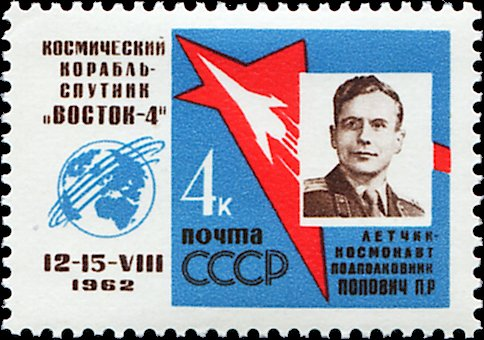
Pavel Popovich

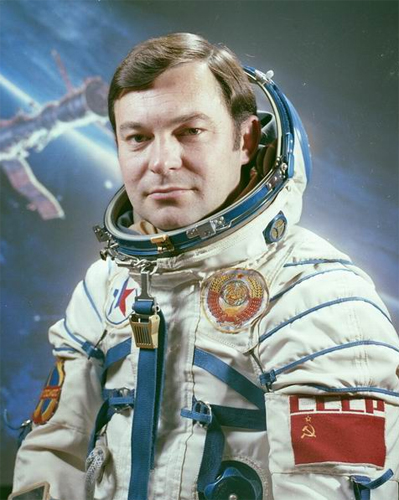
Yuri Romanenko

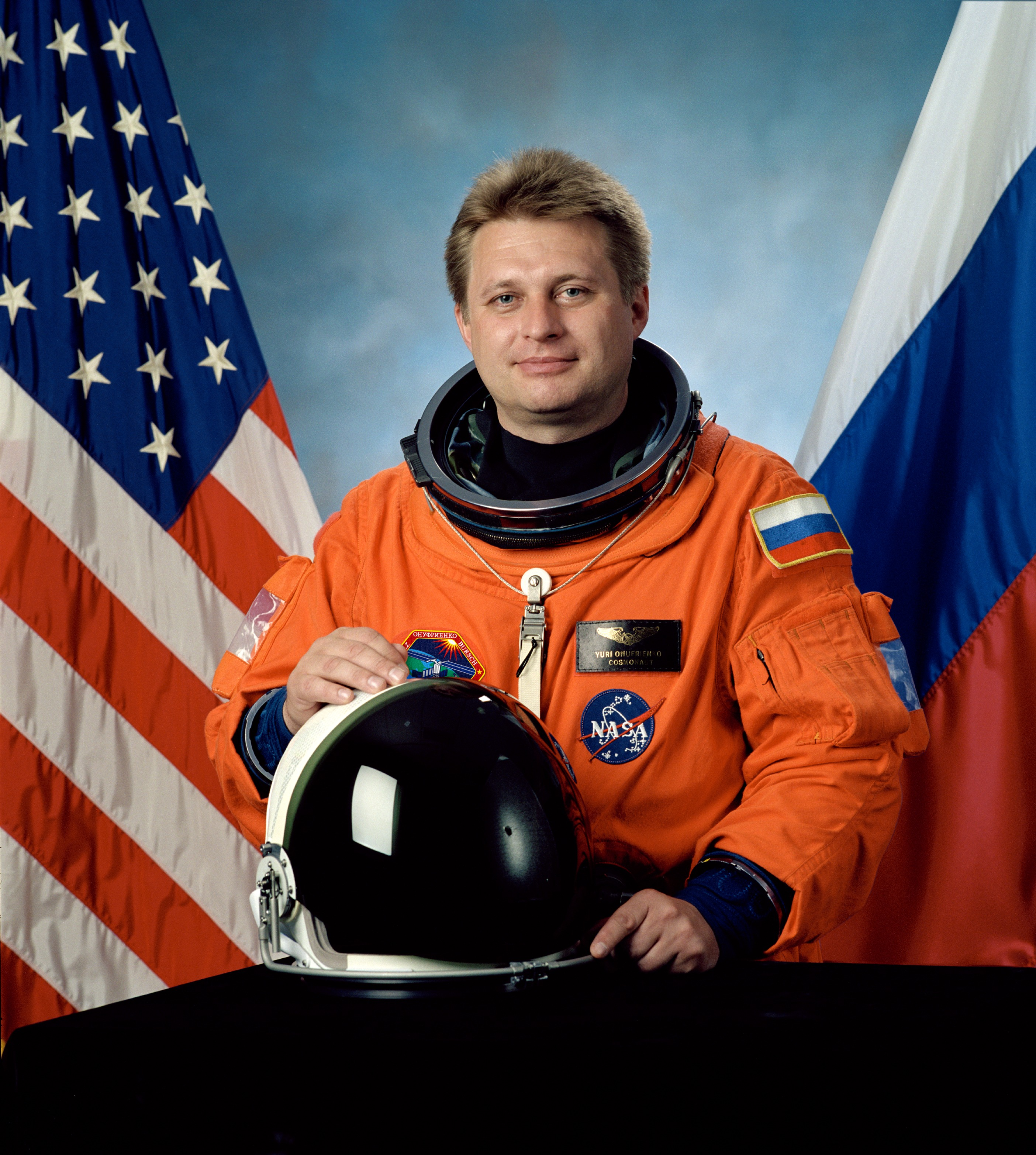
Yury Onufriyenko

- Anatoly Artsebarsky – Soviet cosmonaut
- Georgy Beregovoy – Soviet cosmonaut No.12, Soviet MP in 1974–89 representing Donetsk region
- Valentin Bondarenko – Soviet cosmonaut
- Andrey Borisenko – Russian cosmonaut
- Georgy Dobrovolsky – Soviet cosmonaut
- Anatoly Filipchenko – Soviet cosmonaut
- Yuri Gidzenko – Russian cosmonaut
- Viktor Gorbatko – Soviet cosmonaut
- Georgy Grechko – Soviet cosmonaut
- Leonid Kizim – Soviet cosmonaut
- Oleg Grigoriyevich Kononenko – Soviet cosmonaut
- Anatoly Levchenko – Soviet cosmonaut
- Yuri Malenchenko – Russian cosmonaut
- Yury Onufriyenko – Russian cosmonaut
- Aleksandr Poleshchuk – Russian cosmonaut
- Pavel Popovich – Soviet cosmonaut No.4; MP in Verkhovna Rada (1964–88); head of Ukrainian diaspora in Moscow
- Roman Romanenko – Russian cosmonaut
- Yuri Romanenko – Soviet cosmonaut
- Igor Volk – Soviet cosmonaut
- Alexey Zubritsky – Russian cosmonaut

=== Military ===
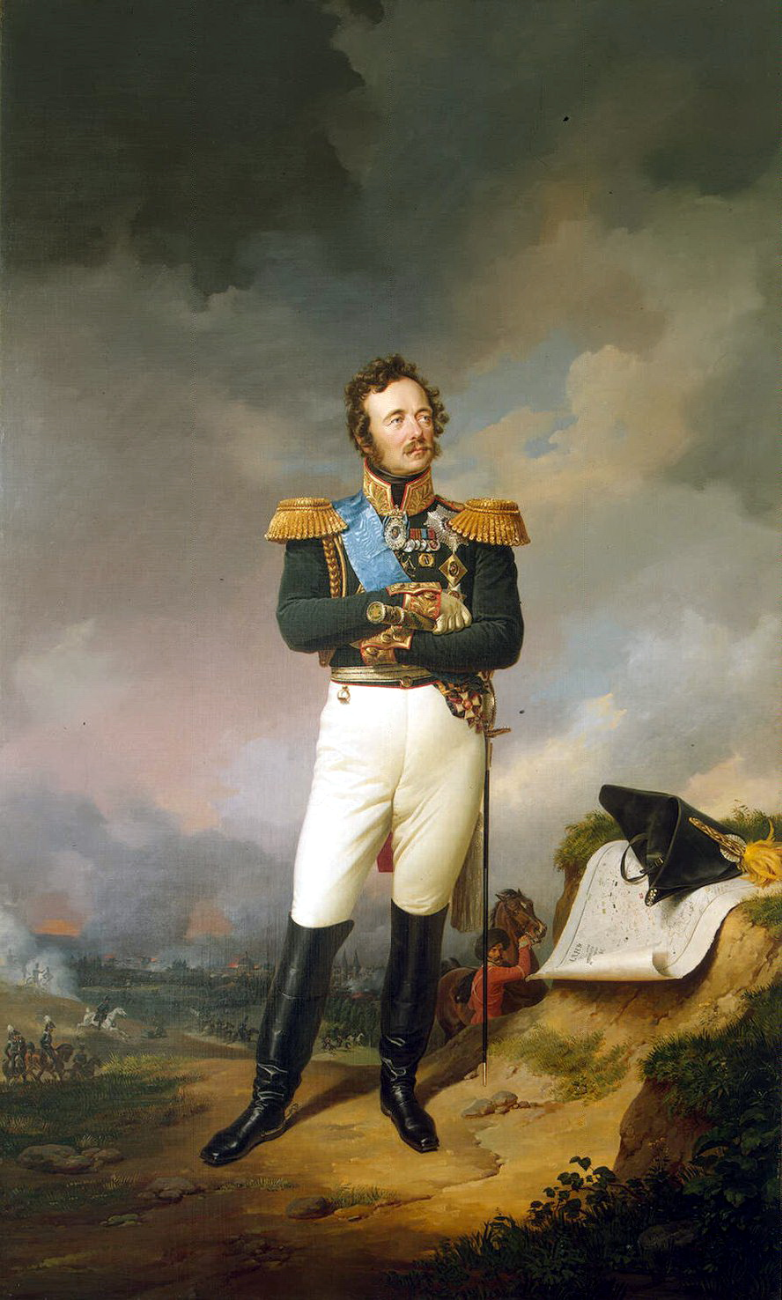
Ivan Paskevich

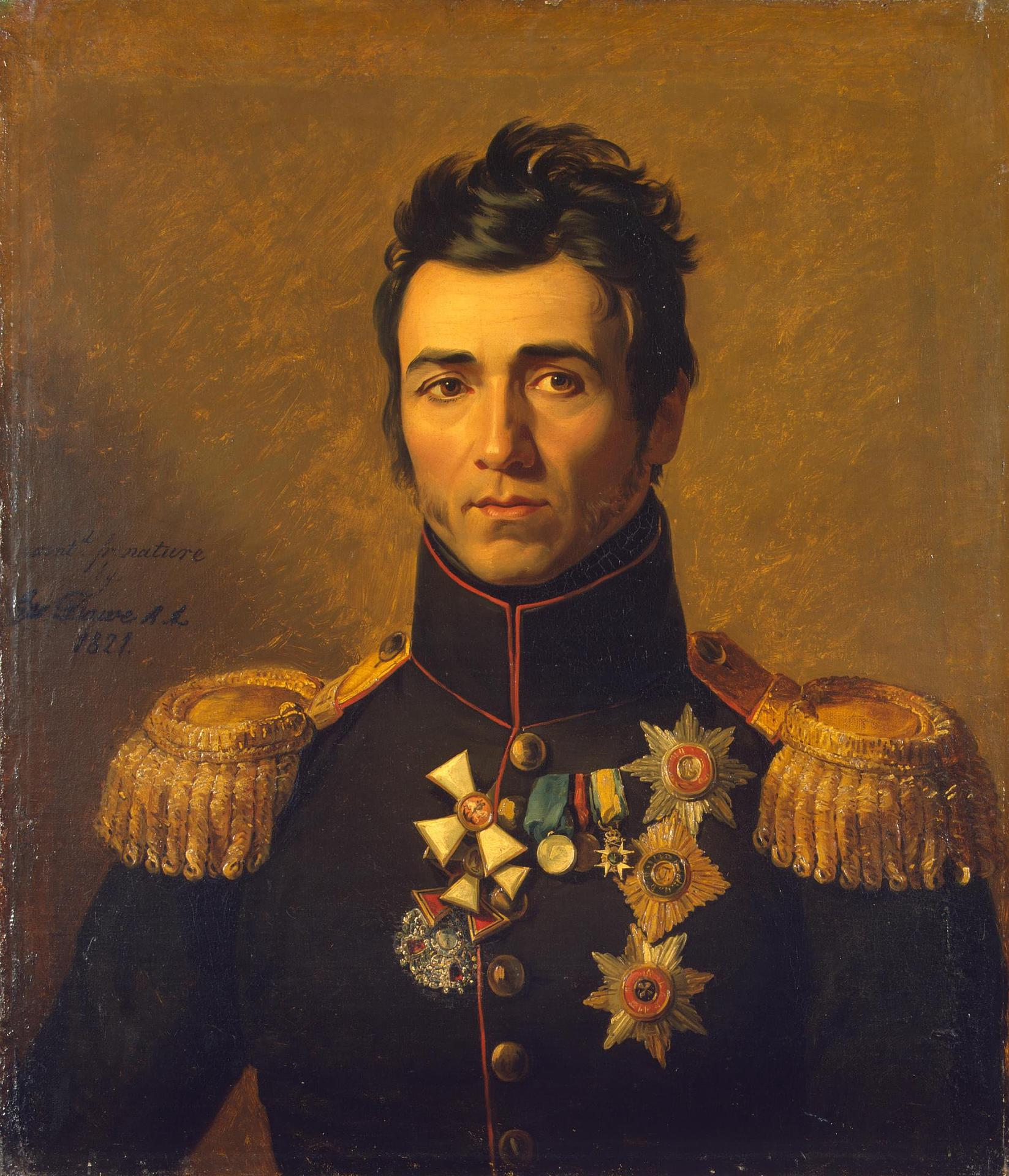
Peter Kaptzevich

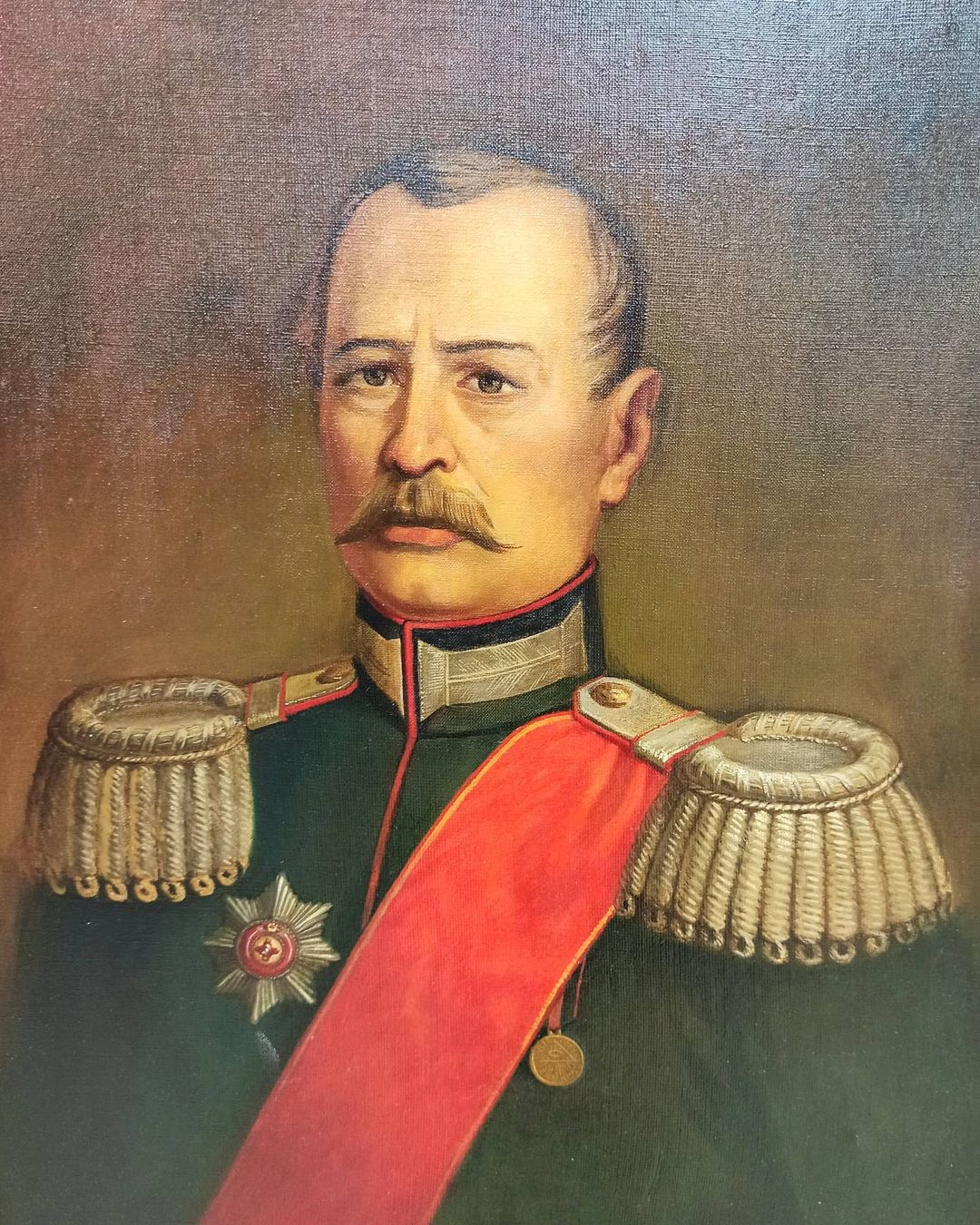
Fyodor Bursak

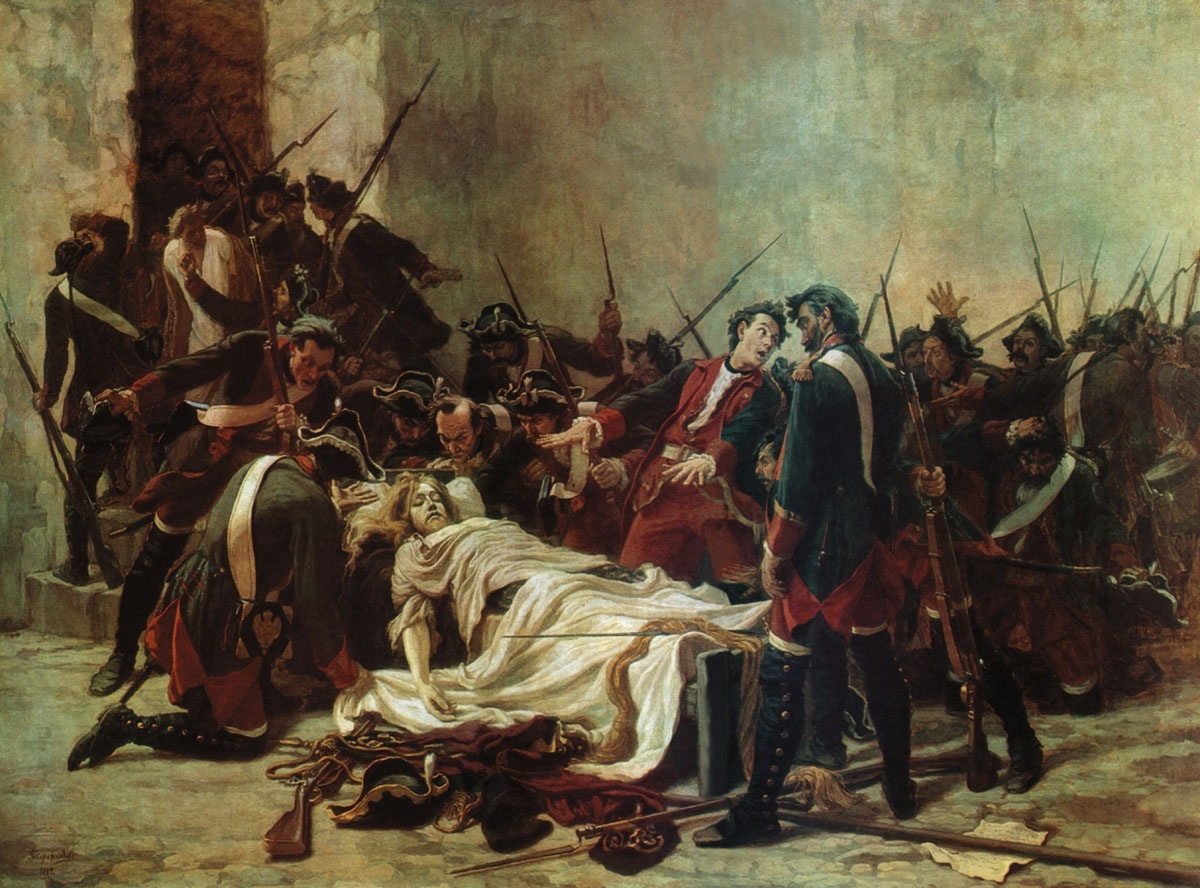
Vasily Mirovich Standing over the Corpse of Ivan VI

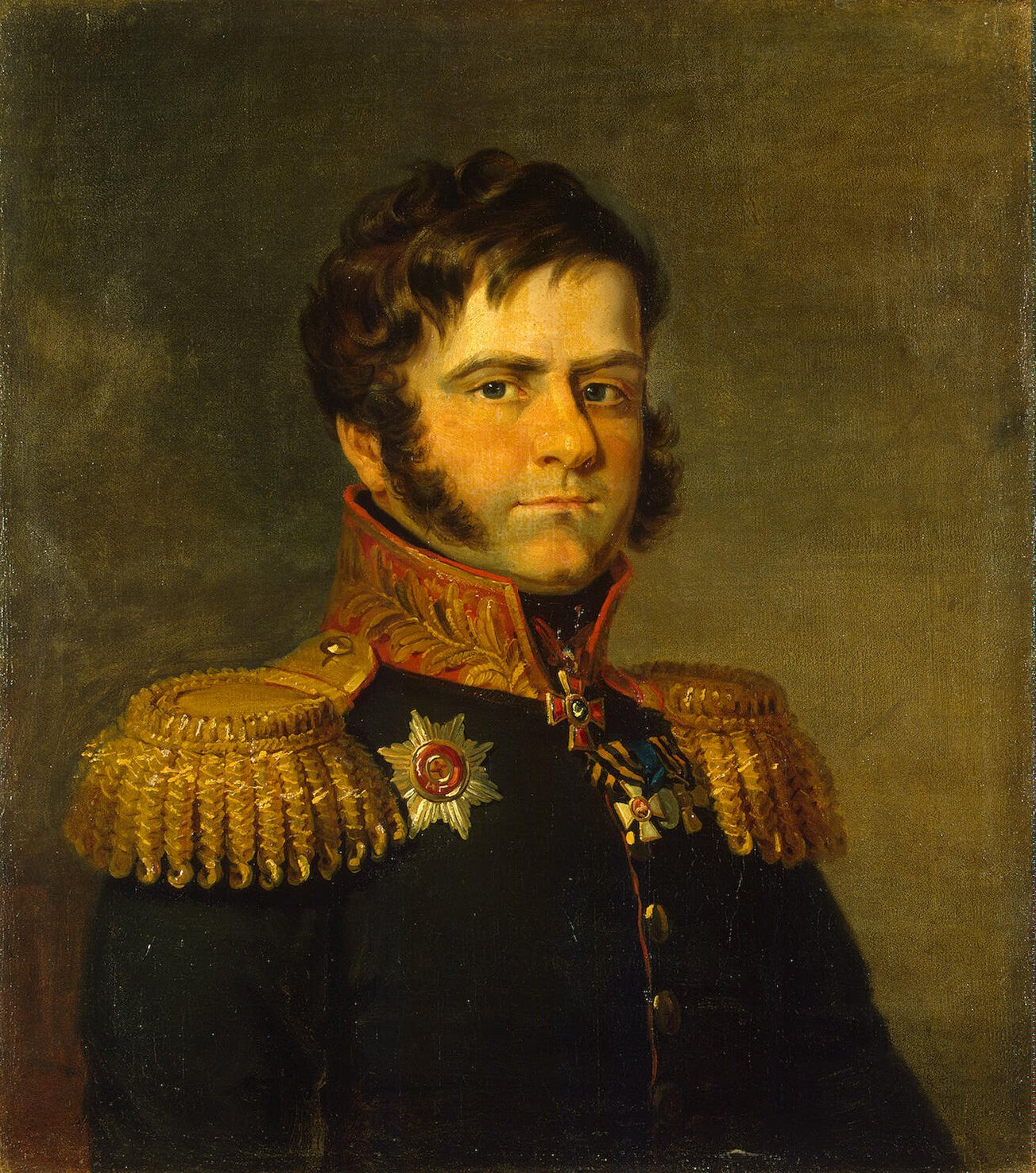
Dmitry Neverovsky

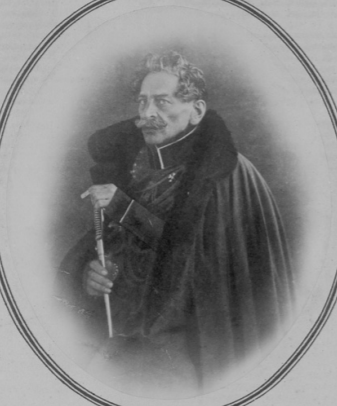
Vasily Perovsky

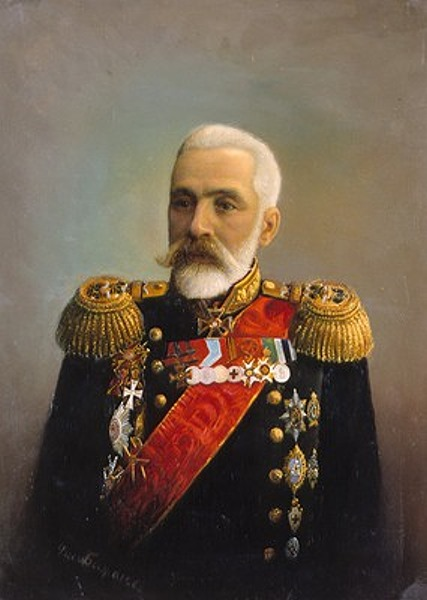
Ivan Grigorovich

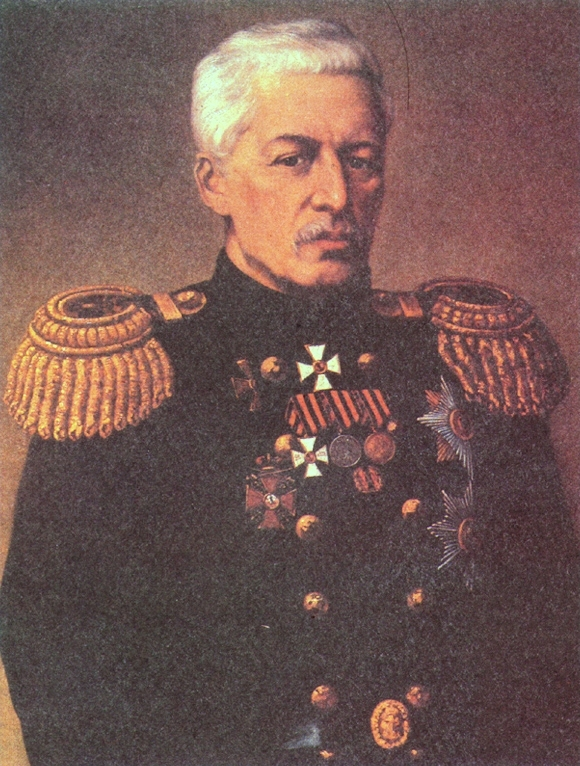
Vasily Zavoyko

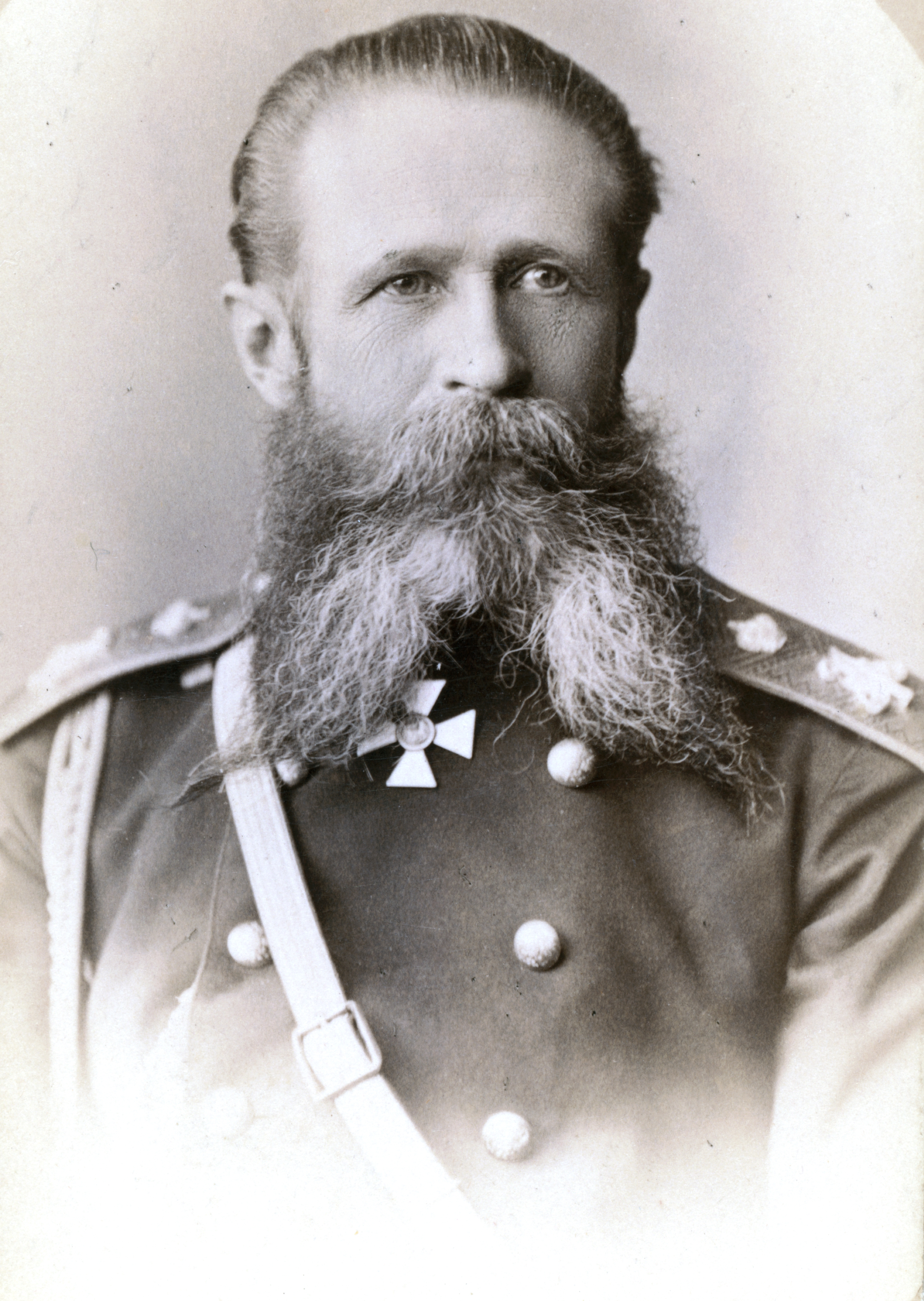
Iosif Gurko

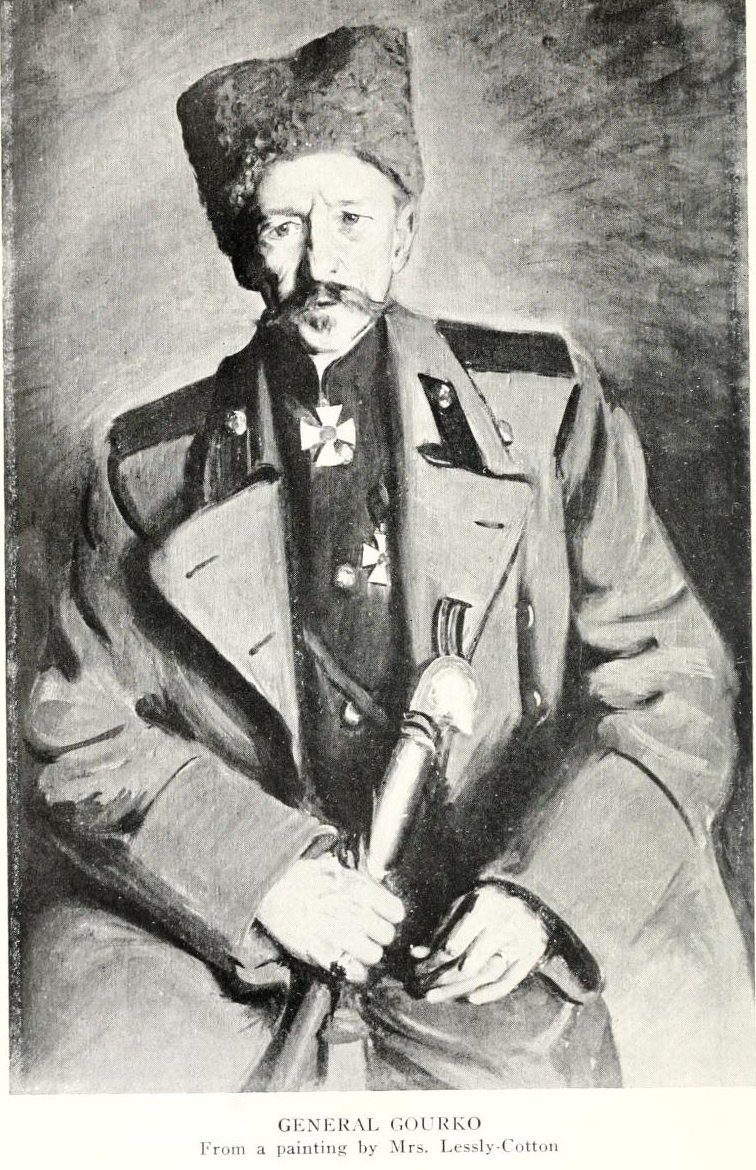
Vasily Gurko

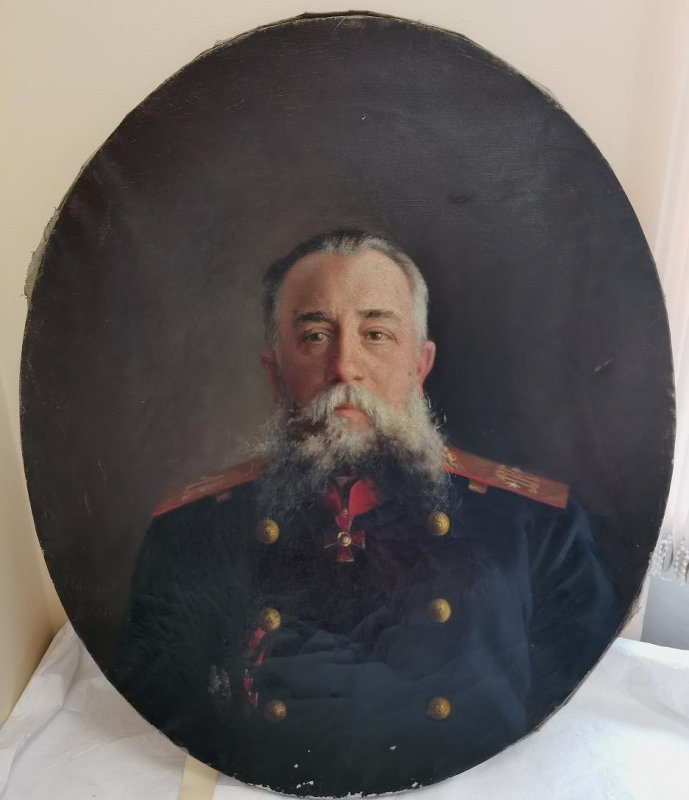
Vasiliy Pokotilo

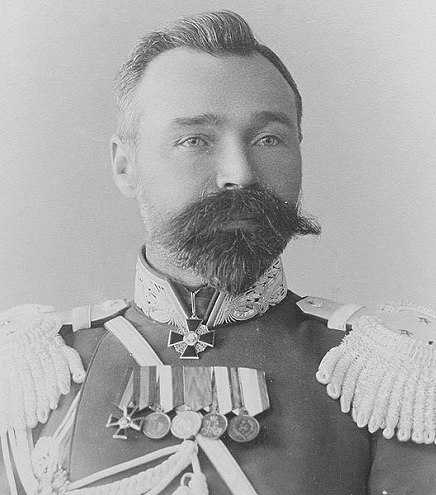
Roman Kondratenko

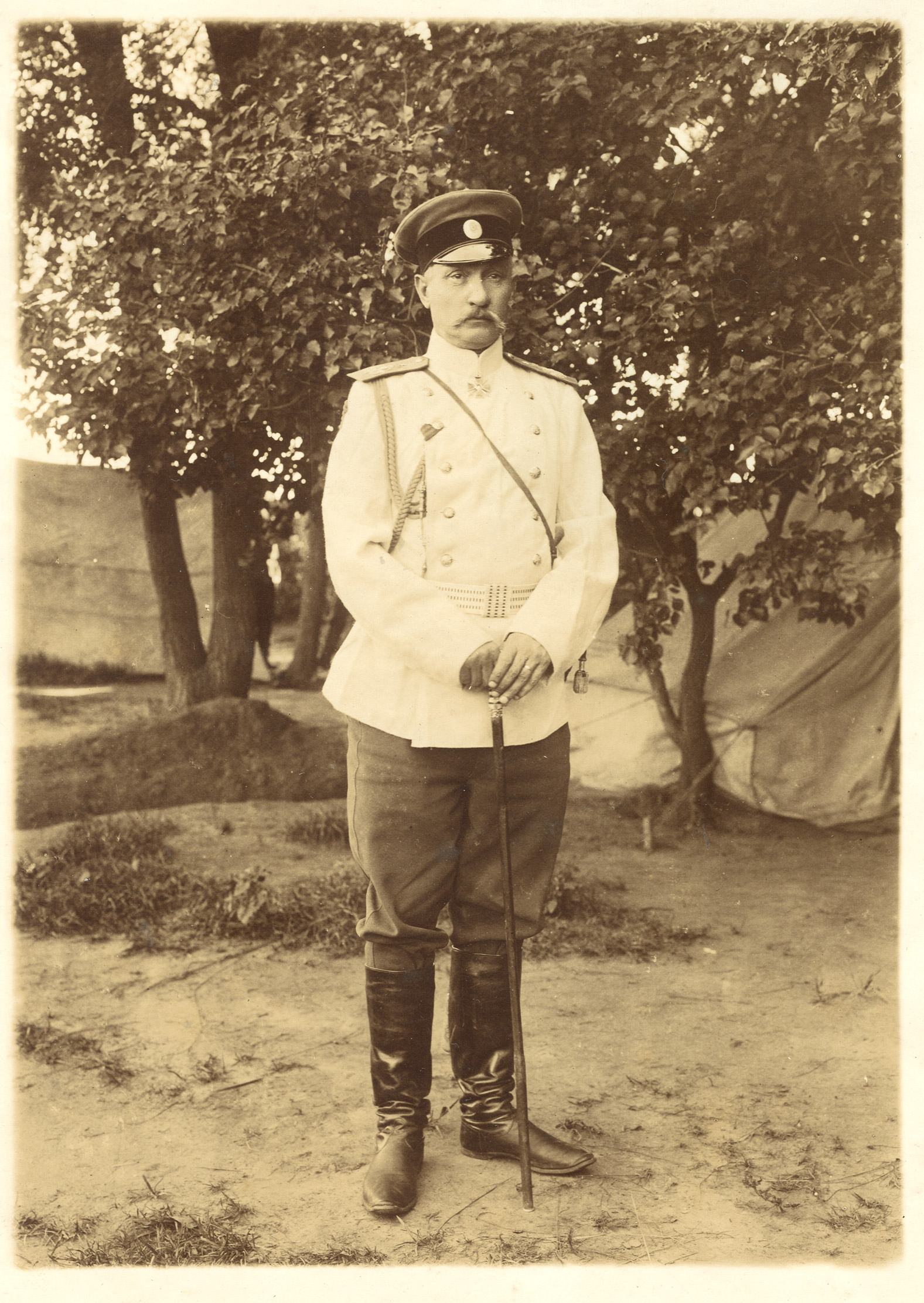
Pavel Mishchenko

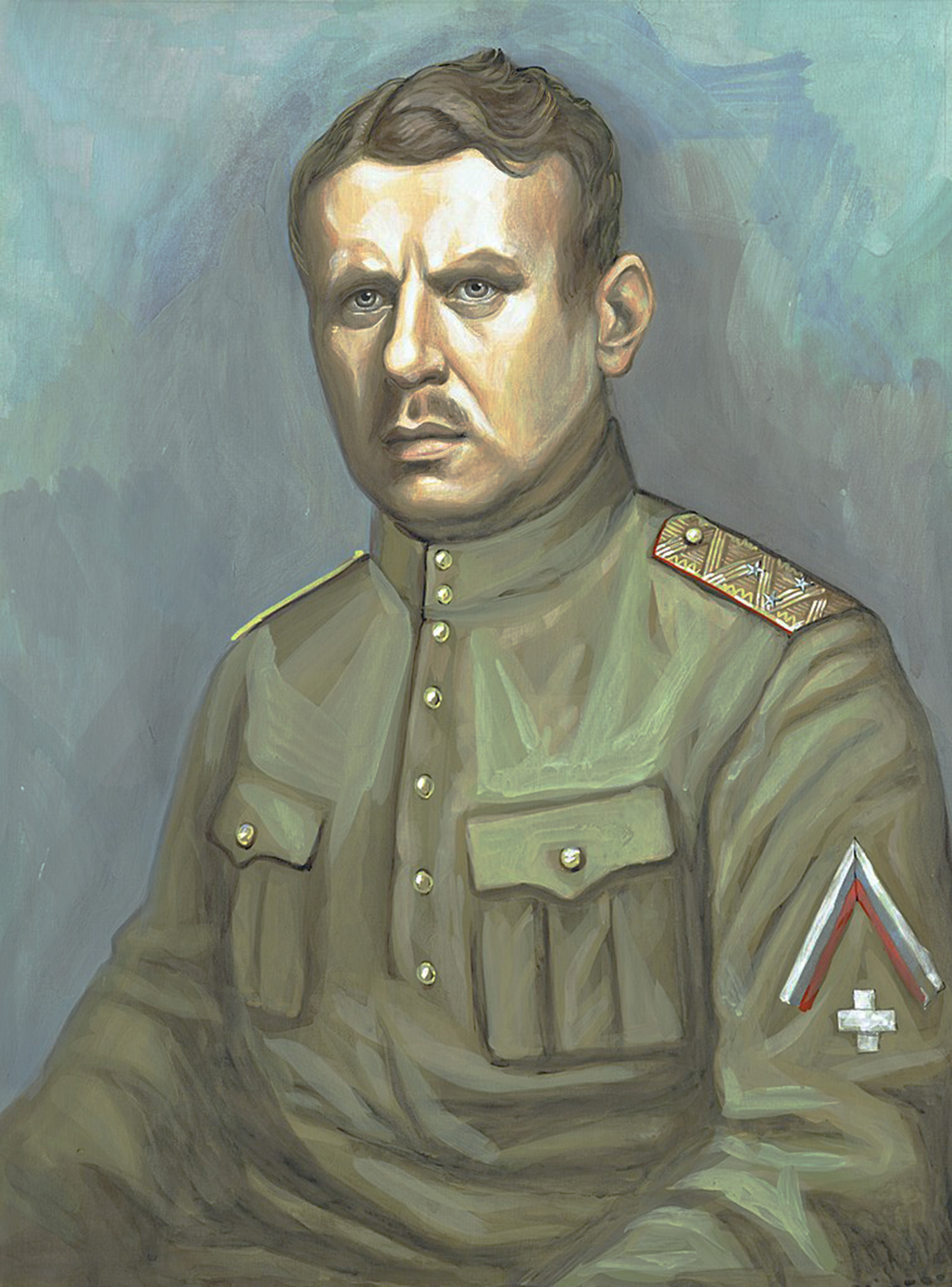
Alexander Rodzyanko

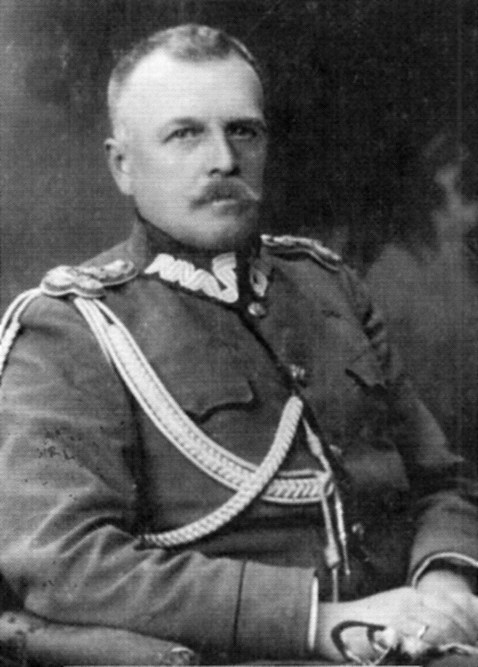
Władysław Wejtko

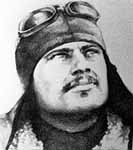
Vasili Yanchenko

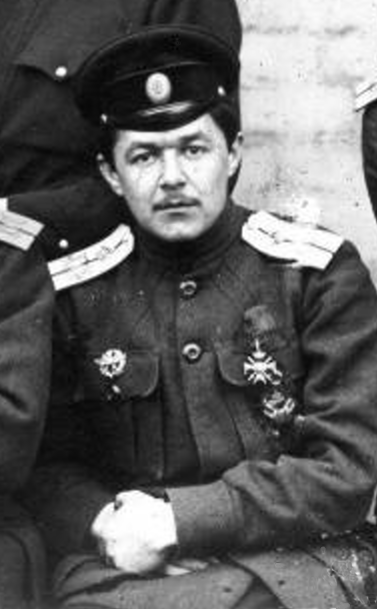
Ivan Loiko

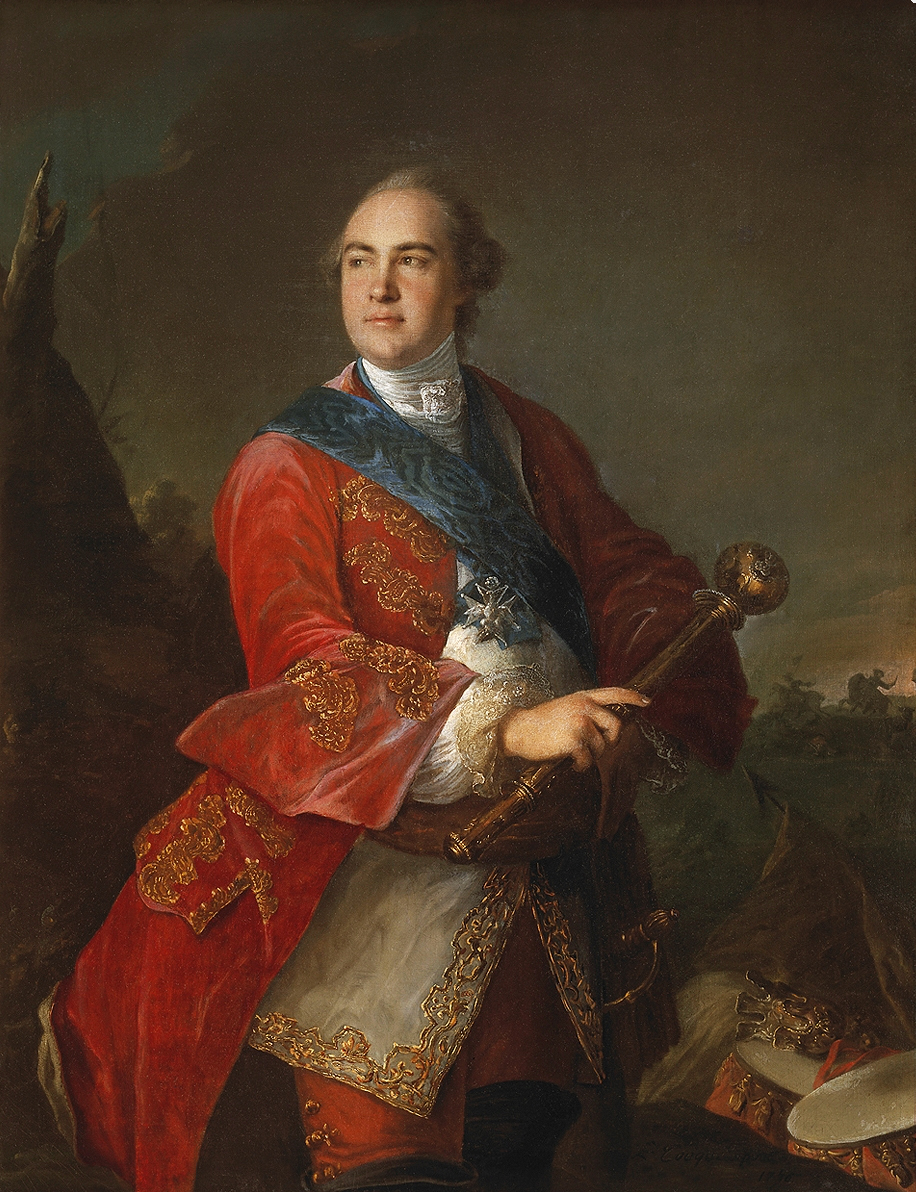
Kirill Razumovsky

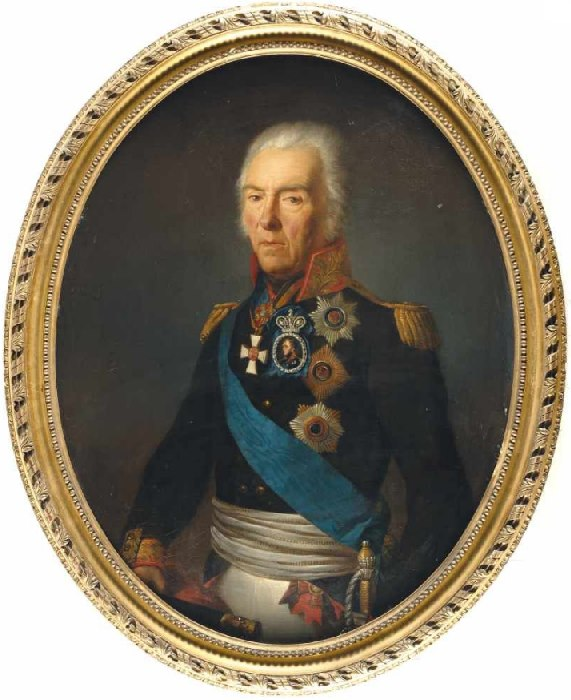
Ivan Gudovich

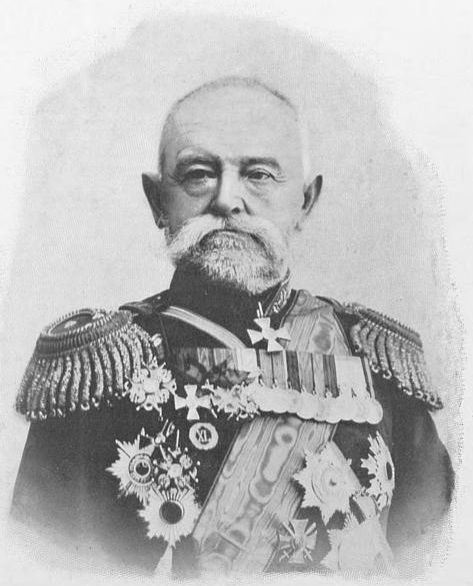
Nikolai Linevich

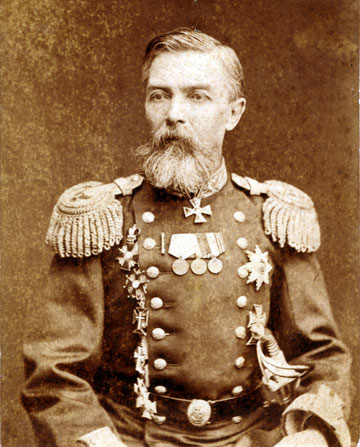
Pavel Zelenoy

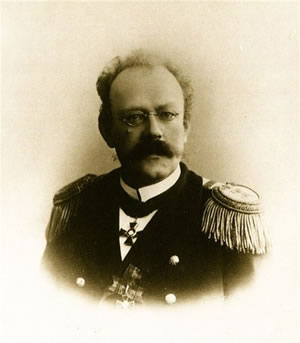
Vladimir Miklukha

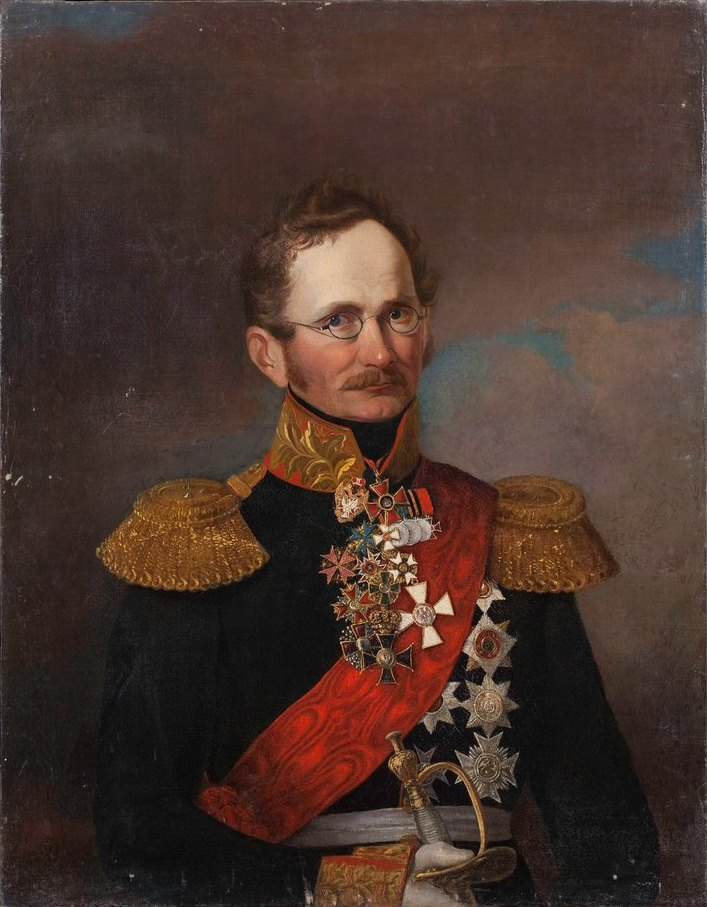
Alexander Mikhailovsky-Danilevsky

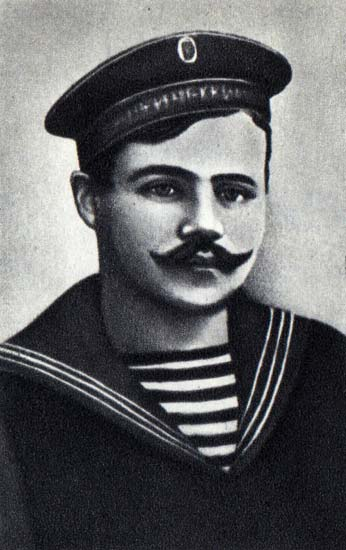
Grigory Vakulenchuk

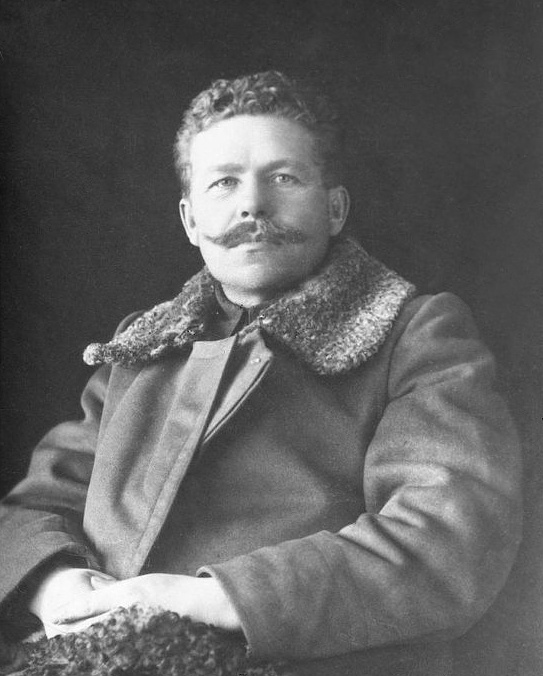
Alexander Kravchenko (revolutionary)

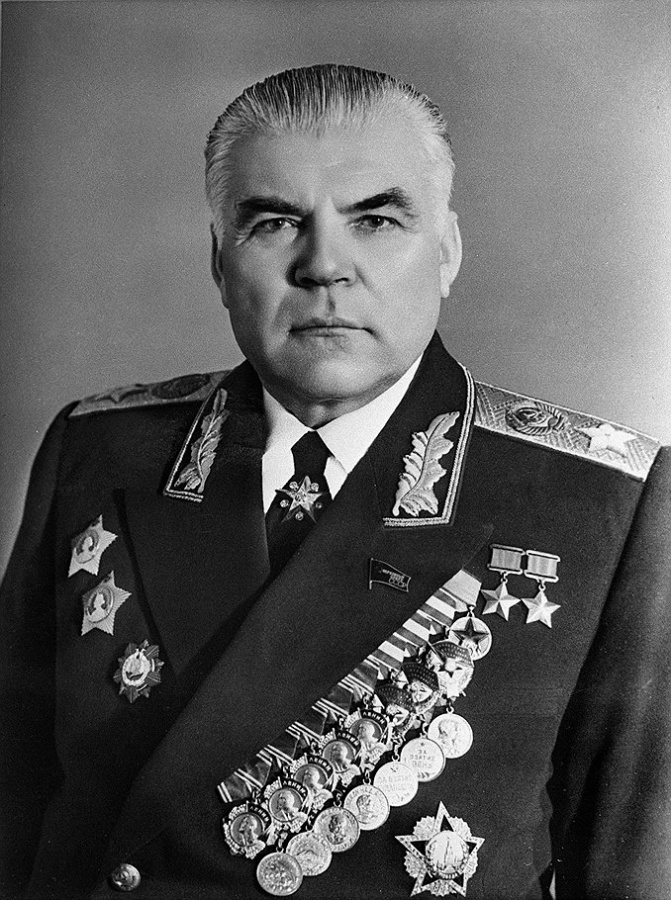
Rodion Malinovsky

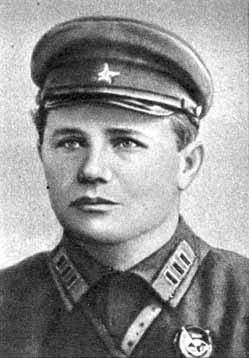
Andrey Yeryomenko

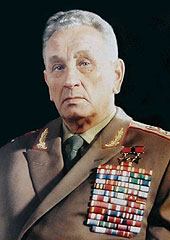
Andrei Grechko

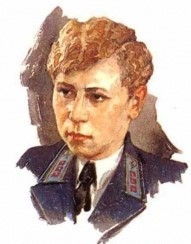
Yekaterina Zelenko

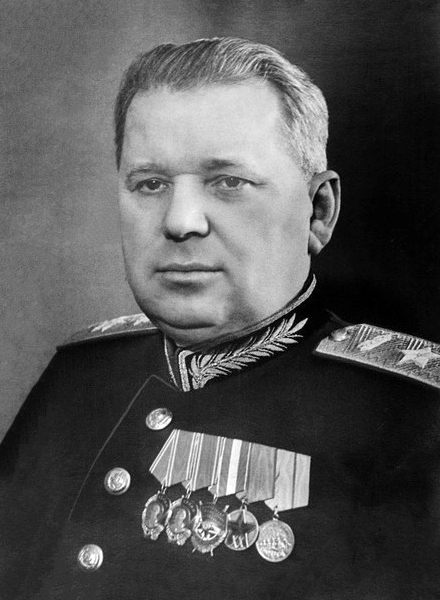
Yakov Fedorenko

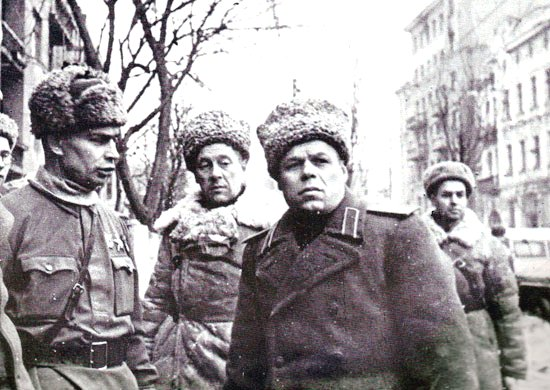
Pavel Rybalko

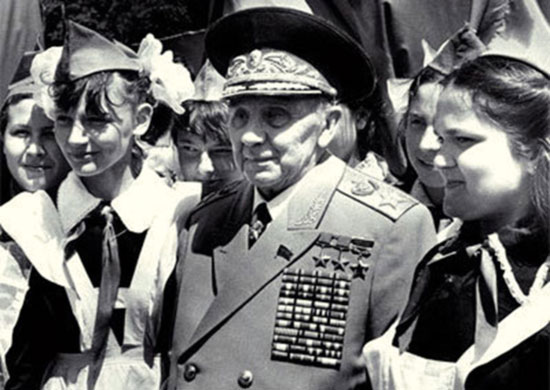
Kirill Moskalenko

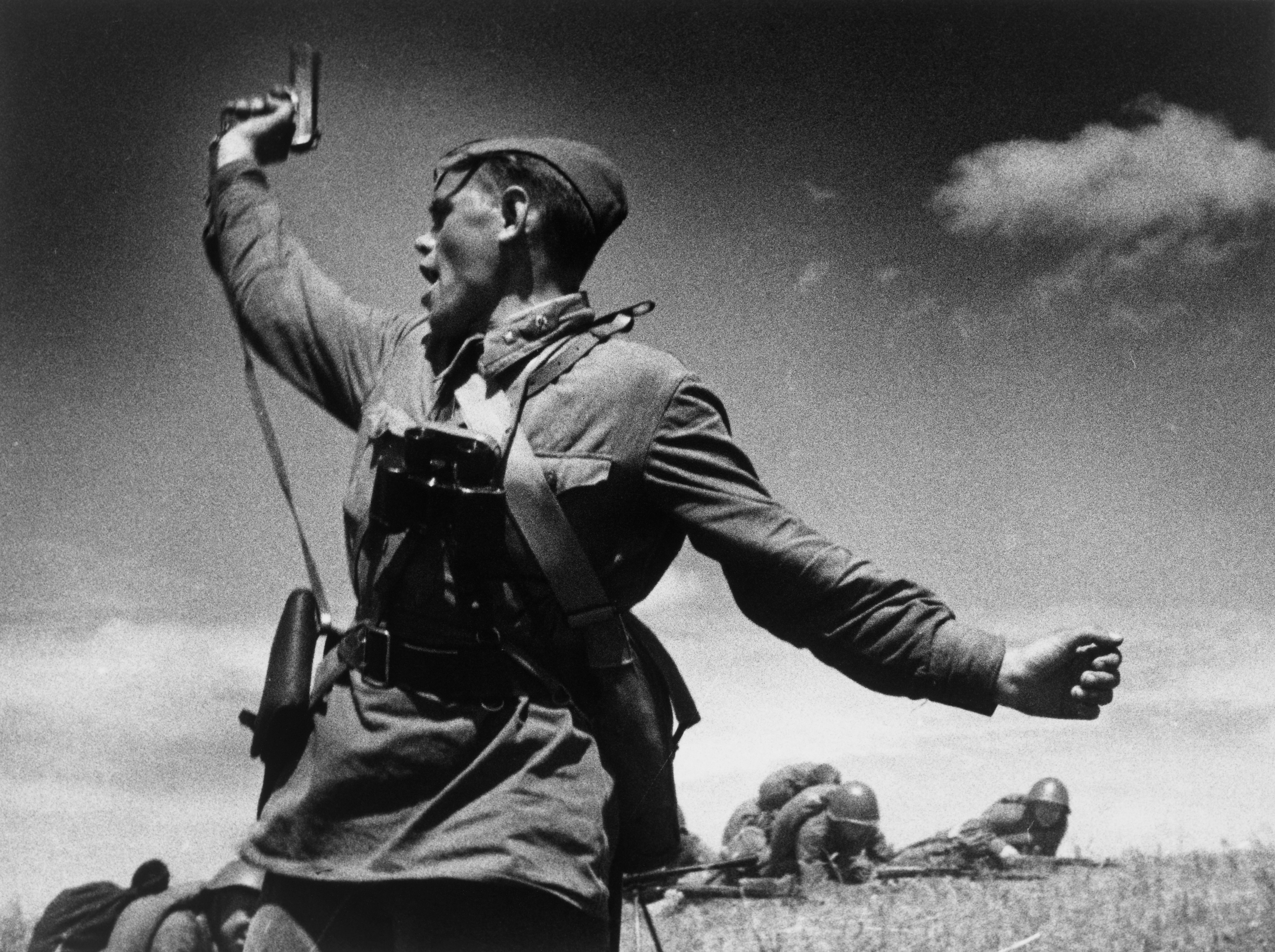
Aleksei Yeryomenko

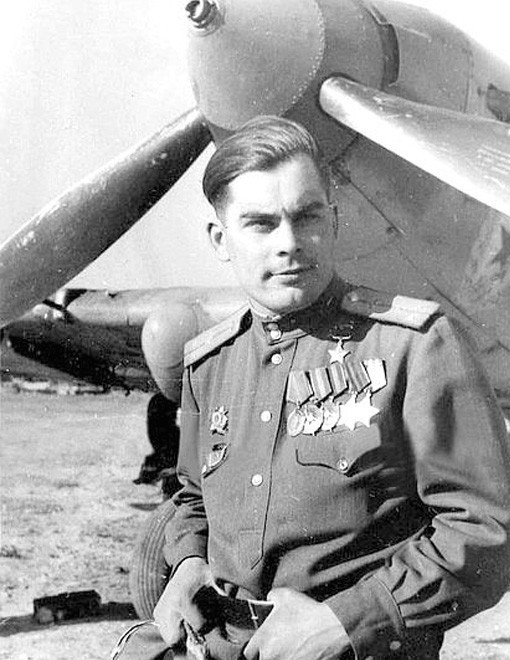
Ivan Mikhailichenko

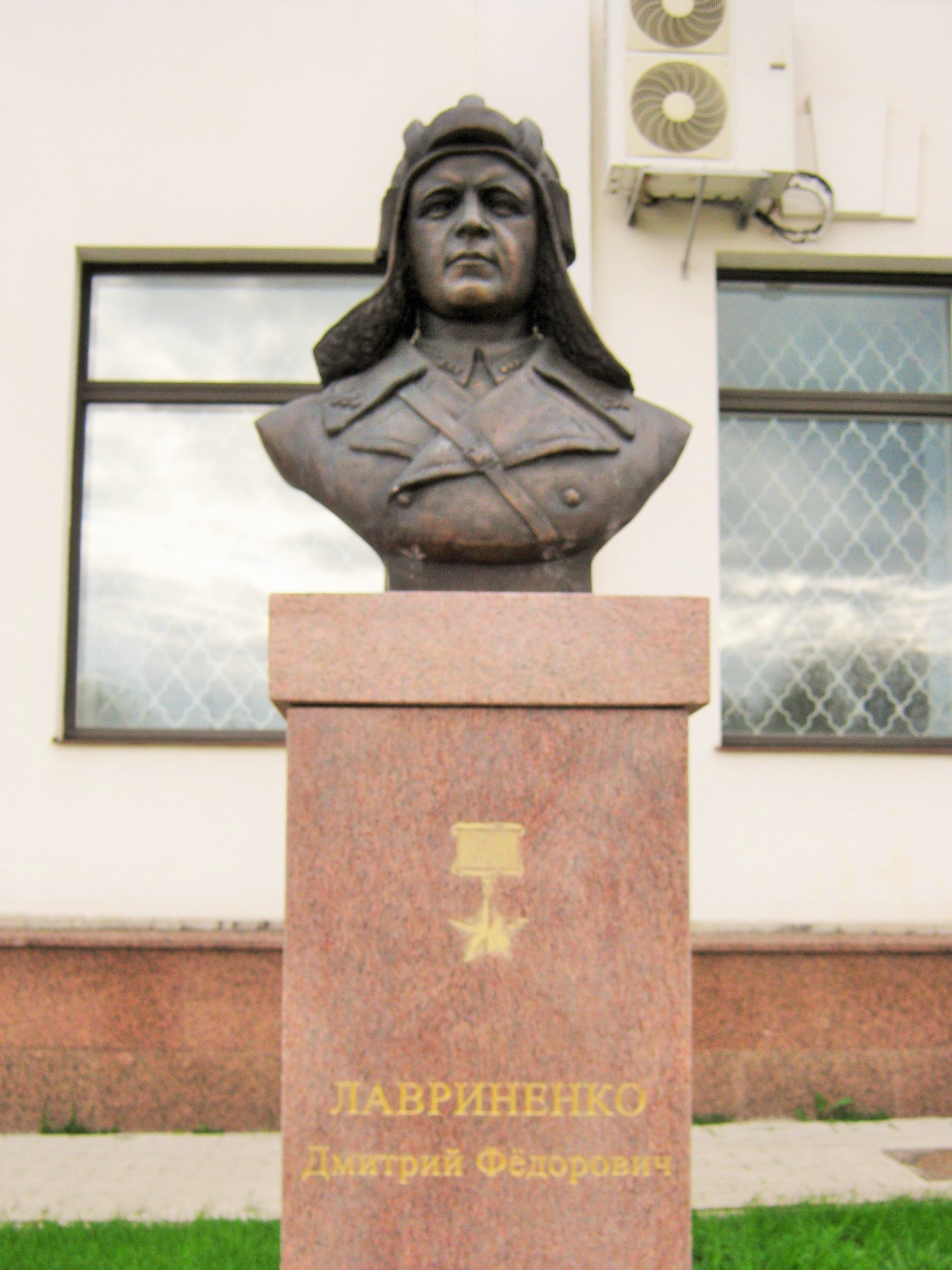
Dmitry Lavrinenko

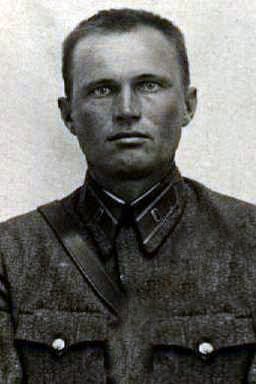
Alexander Utvenko

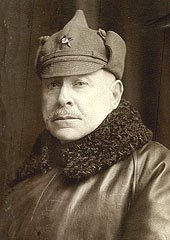
Alexander Samoylo

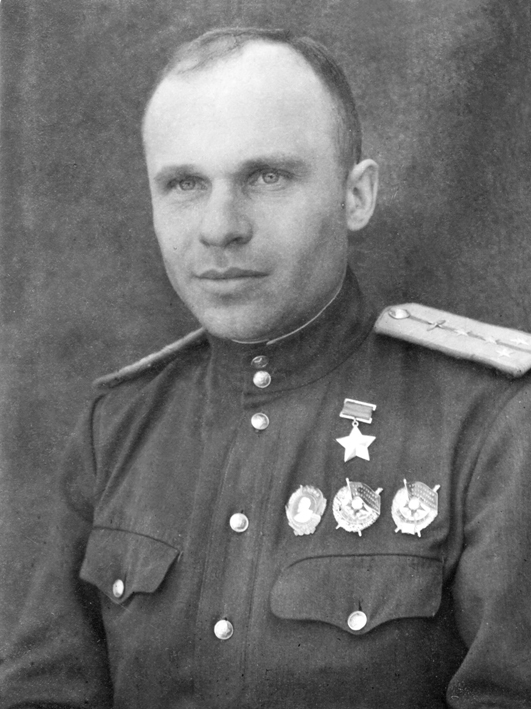
Mikhail Bondarenko

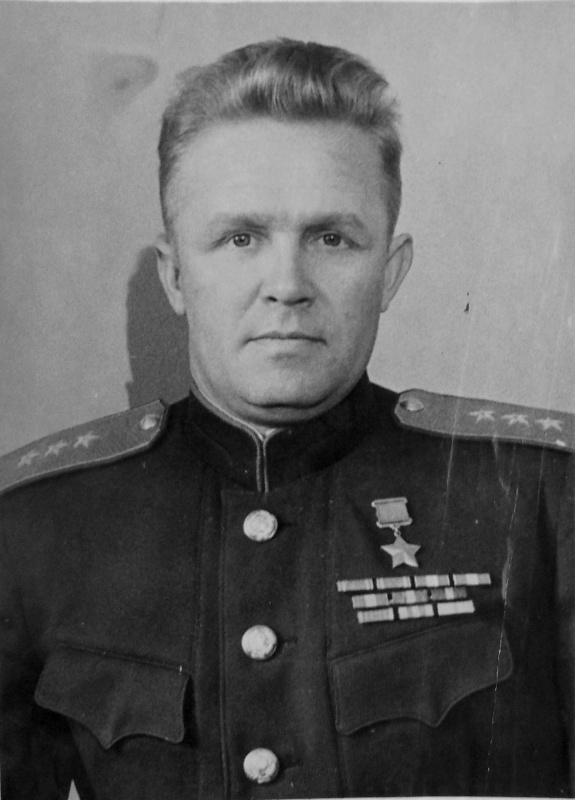
Sergei Rudenko

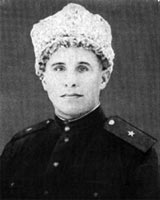
Ivan Sidorovich Lazarenko

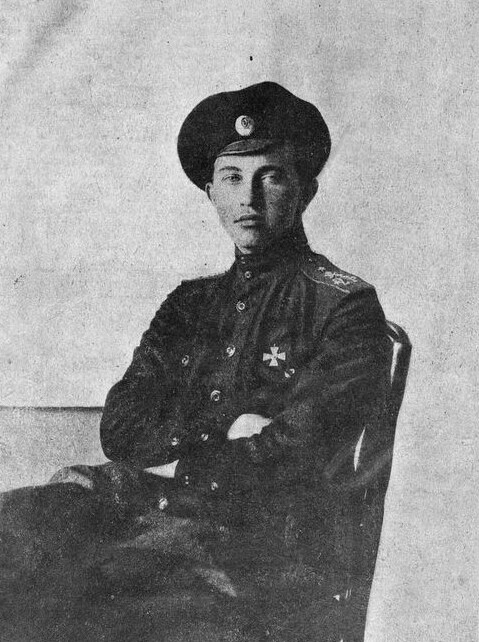
Yevgraf Kruten

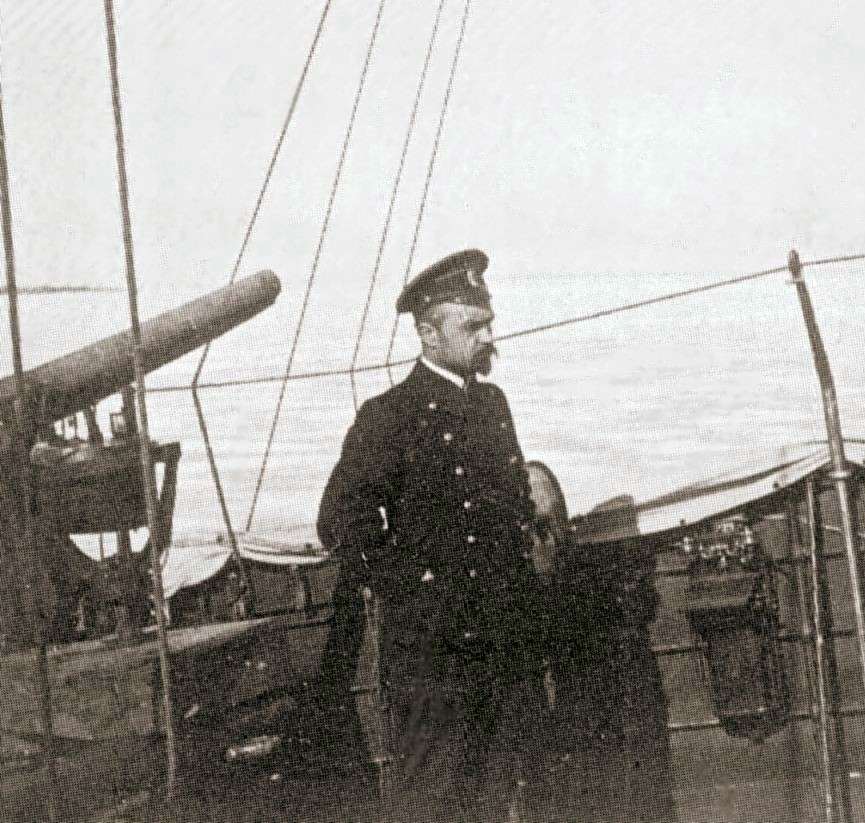
Alexey Schastny

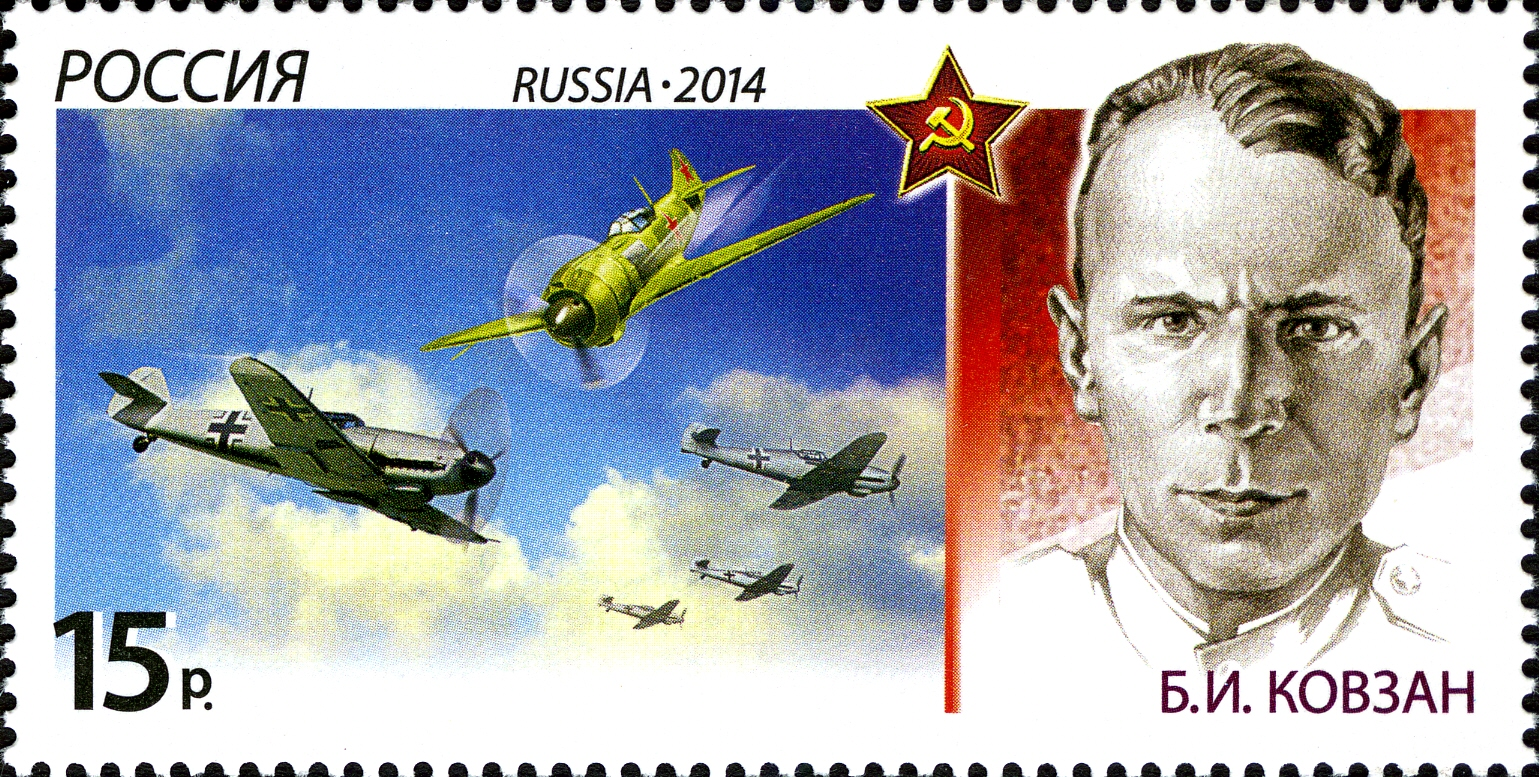
Boris Kovzan

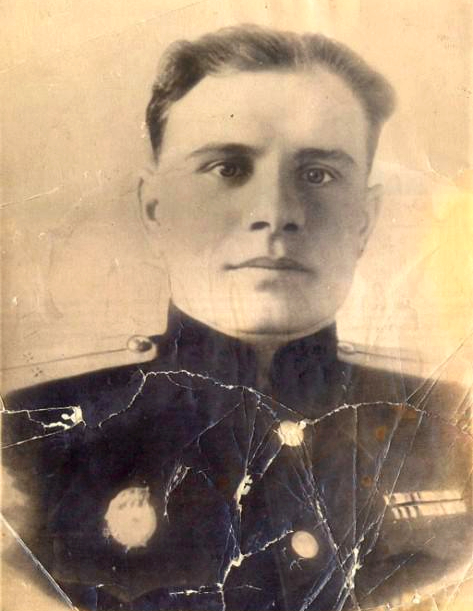
Alexei Berest

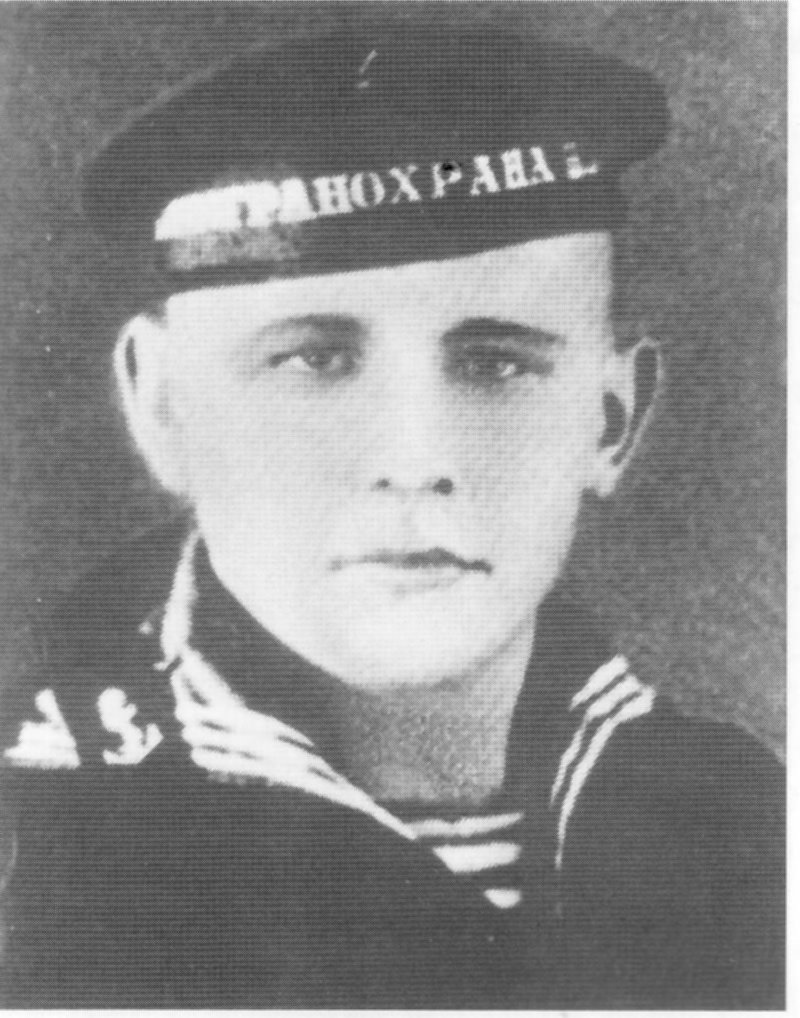
Ivan Golubets

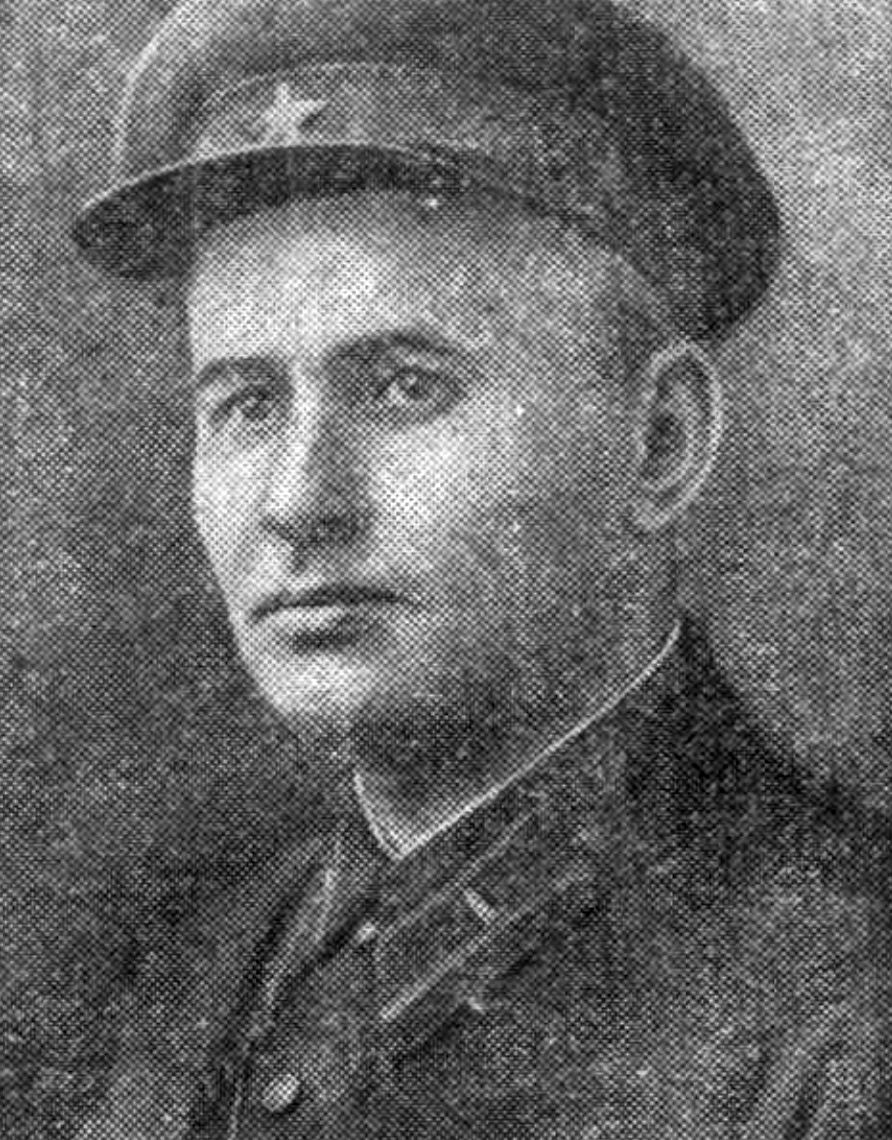
Timofei Strokach

Pavel Dubinda

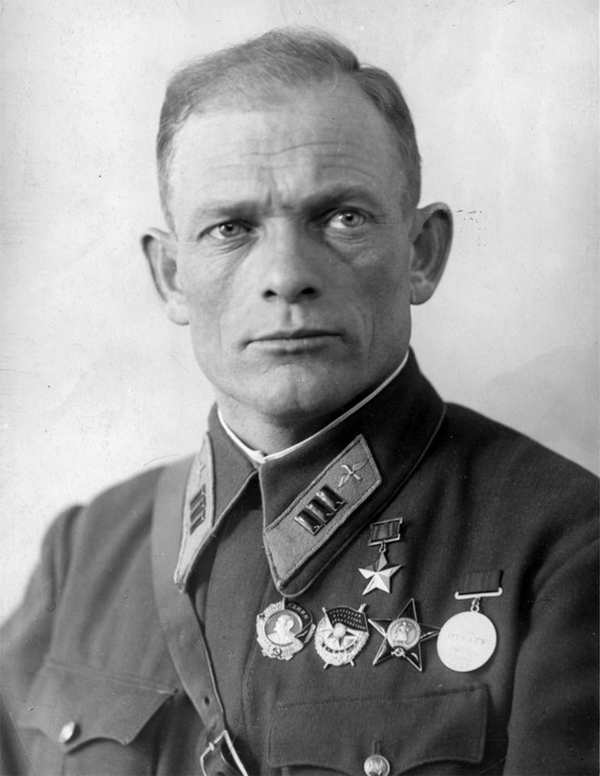
Andrey Vitruk

Grigory Simanchuk, Soviet sniper. During the Siege of Leningrad, he killed 287 german soldiers

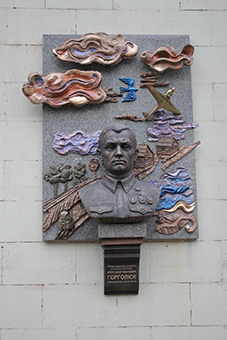
Aleksandr Gorgolyuk

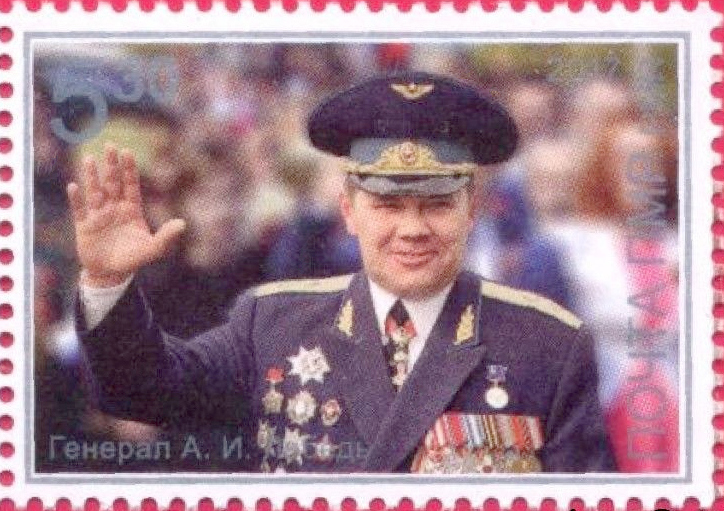
Alexander Lebed

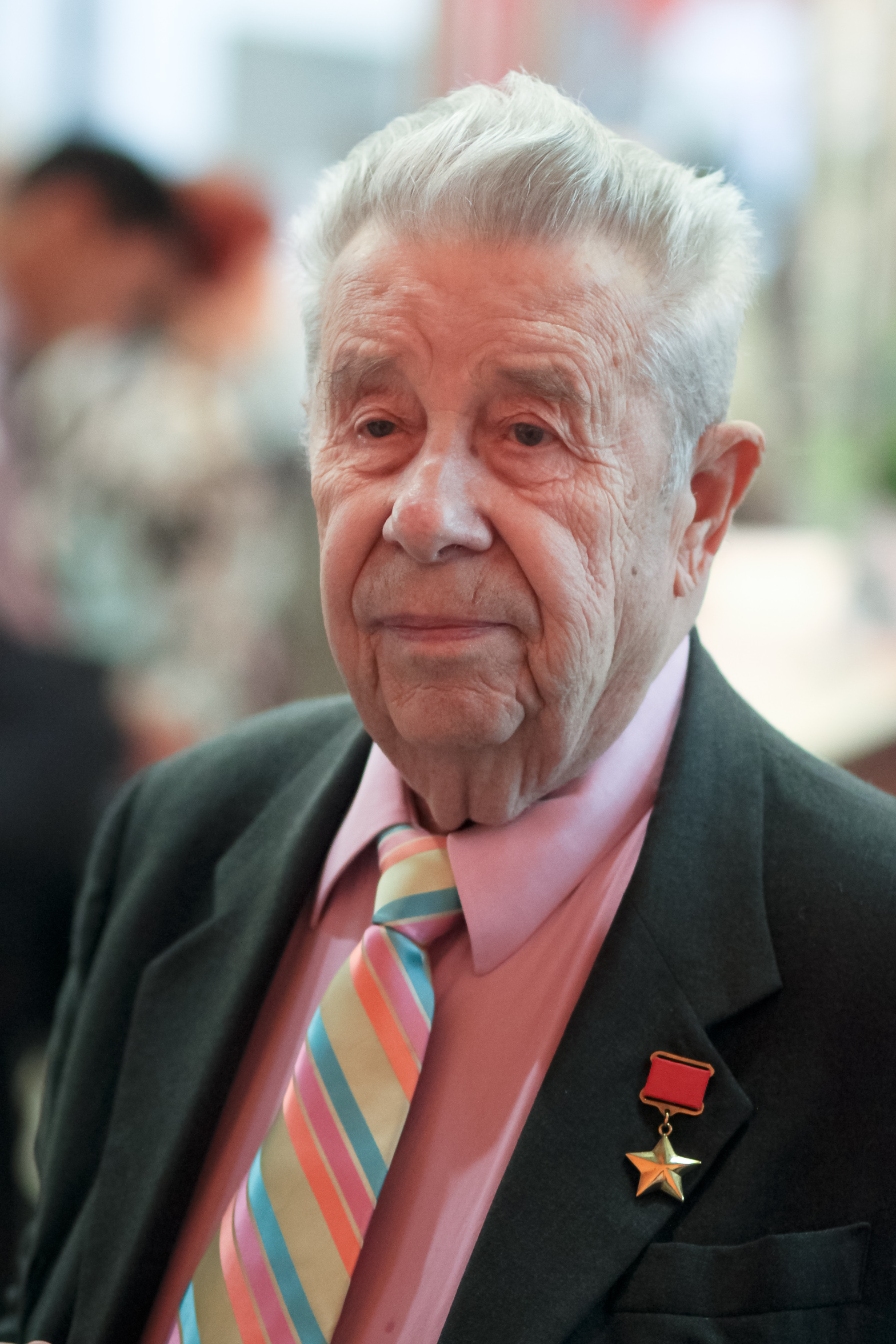
Pyotr Braiko

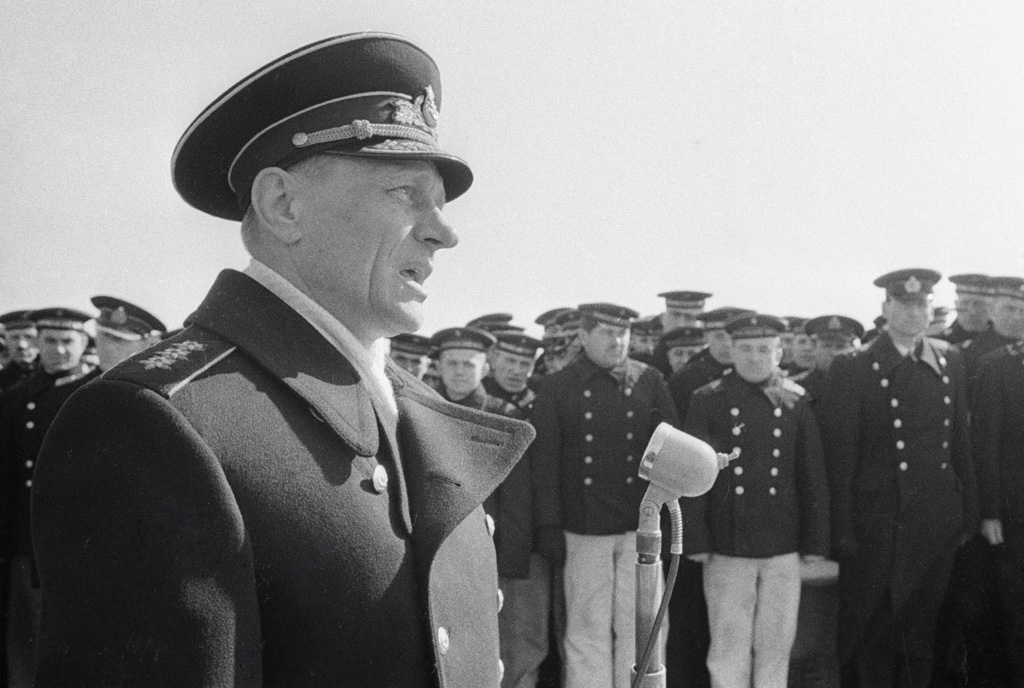
Nikolai Amelko

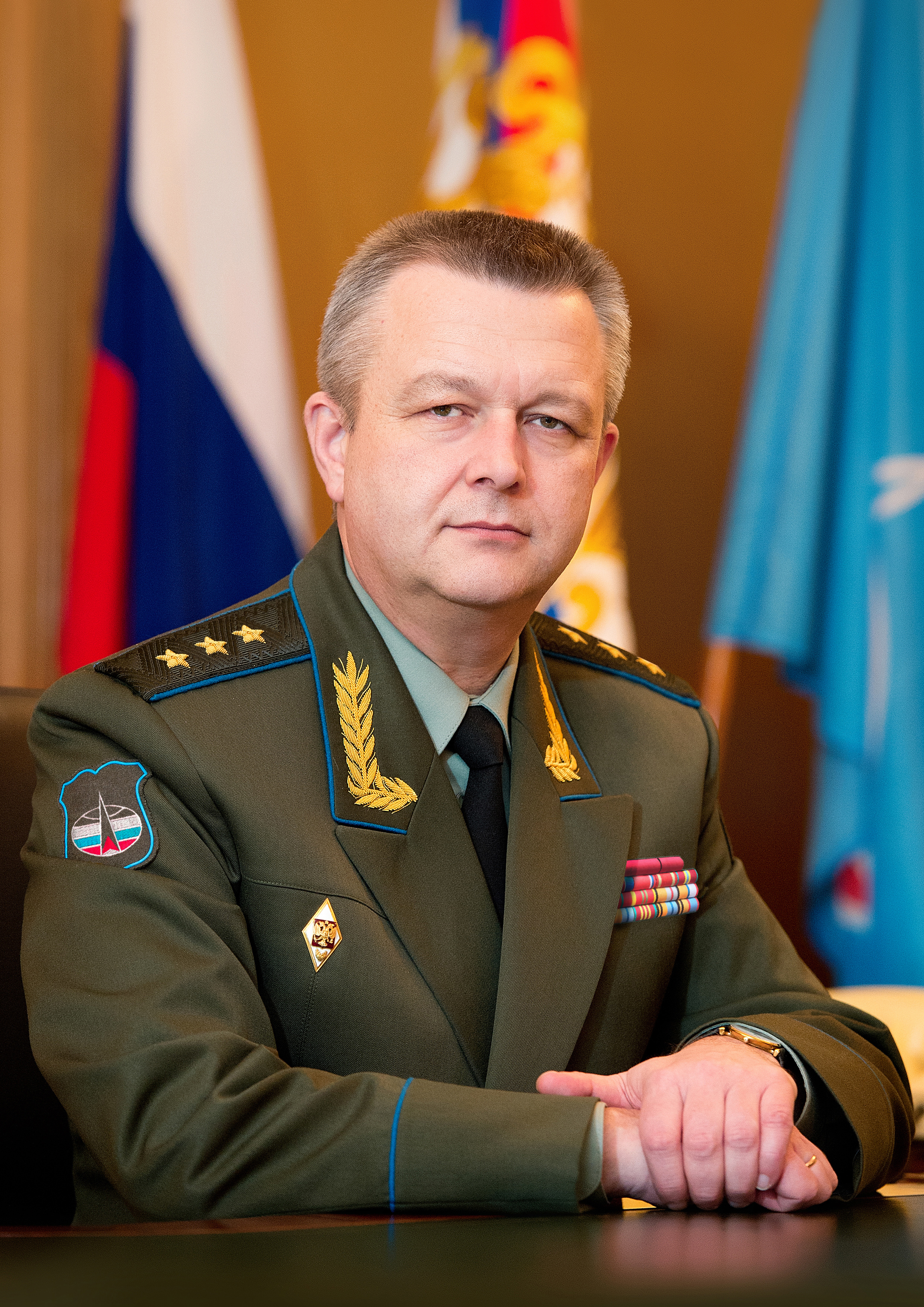
Aleksandr Golovko

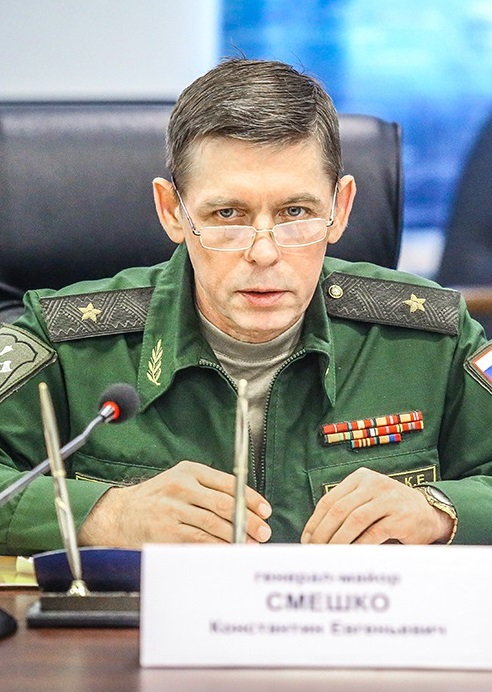
Konstantin Smeshko

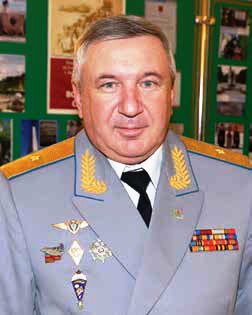
Alexander Tatarenko

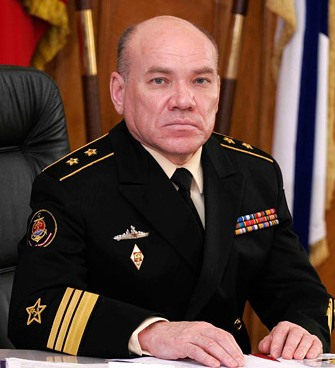
Viktor Kravchuk

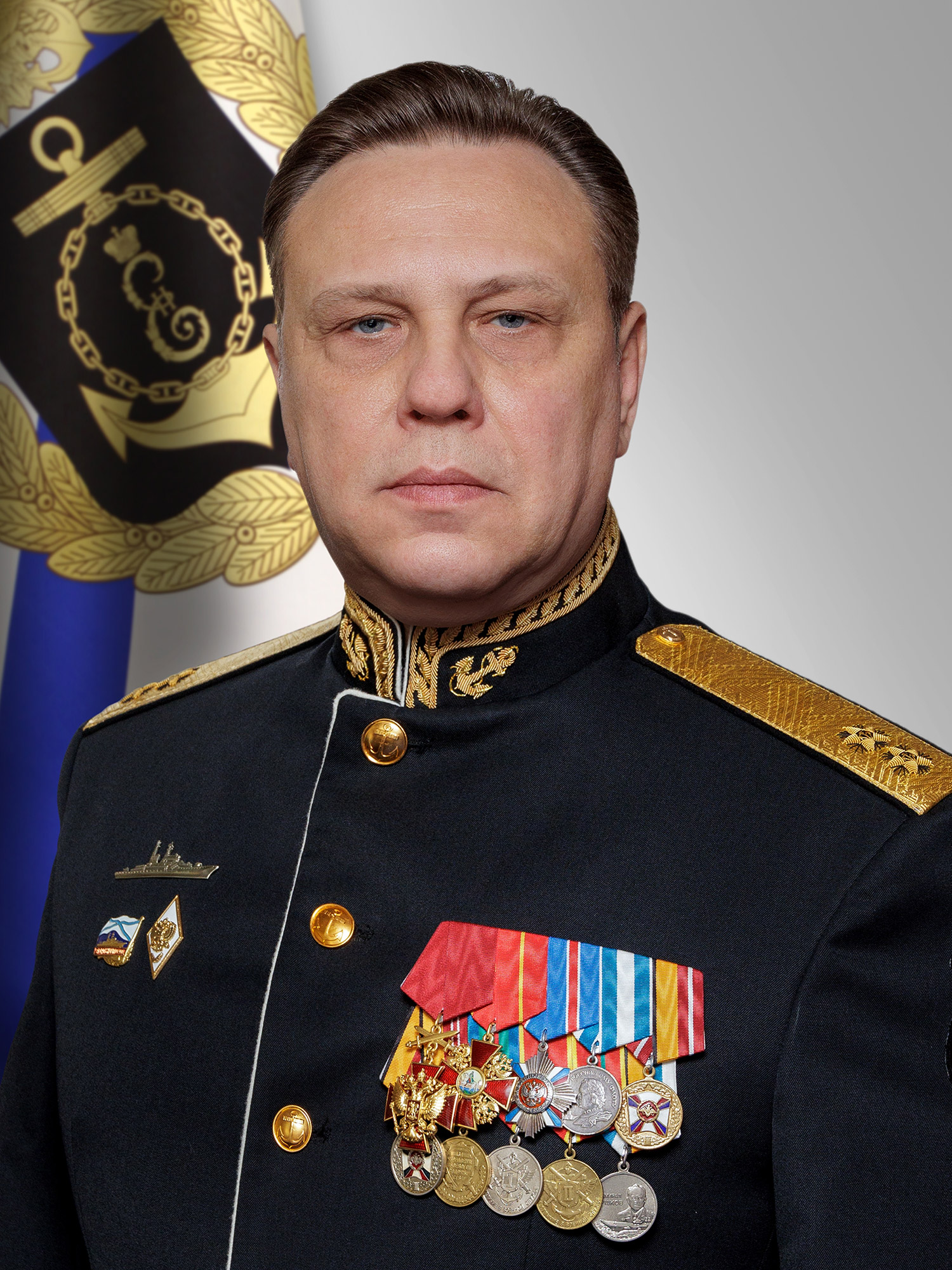
Sergei Pinchuk

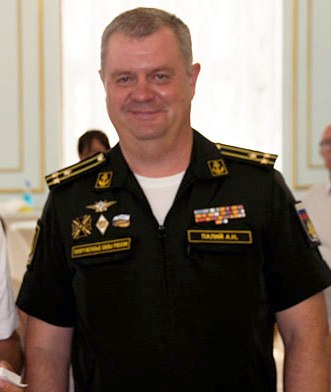
Andrei Paliy

- Ivan Afanasenko – Red Army Sergeant and a Hero of the Soviet Union
- Vladimir Aleksenko – ground-attack aviation squadron and regimental commander during World War II who was twice awarded the title Hero of the Soviet Union
- Ilya Alekseyenko – Red Army major general
- Nikolai Amelko – Soviet naval commander and admiral
- Kornei Andrusenko – Soviet colonel
- Maksim Antoniuk – Soviet general
- Pavel Antseborenko – Soviet soldier, awarded the title of Hero of the Soviet Union posthumously
- Iosif Apanasenko – Soviet division commander
- Fyodor Arkhipenko – flying ace of the Soviet Air Force during the Second World War and recipient of the title Hero of the Soviet Union
- Stepan Artyomenko – commander of a battalion of the 447th Rifle Regiment in the Red Army during the Second World War, who was twice awarded the title Hero of the Soviet Union
- Fedir Babachenko – junior lieutenant and chief of intelligence in the 323rd Artillery Regiment of the 123rd Infantry Division in the 7th Army on the Northwestern Front during the Winter War
- Vasily Bachilo – Soviet Army major general who held divisional command during the Cold War
- Mikhail Badyuk – Soviet aviator in the 9th Guards Mine Torpedo Aviation Regiment of the 5th Mine-Torpedo Air Division in the Northern Fleet's aviation division during the Second World War
- Andrey Baklan – Soviet flying ace during World War II
- Luka Basanets – Soviet military officer who led the Red Army's 140th Rifle Division
- Pavel Batitsky – Soviet military leader awarded the highest honorary title of Hero of the Soviet Union in 1965 and promoted to Marshal of the Soviet Union in 1968
- Georgy Bazilevich – Soviet komkor (corps commander)
- Leonid Beda – ground-attack squadron commander in the Soviet Air Forces during the Second World War who went on to become a lieutenant-general of aviation
- Alexei Berest – Soviet political officer and one of the three Red Army soldiers who hoisted the Victory Banner
- Ivan Bezugly – Soviet Red Army officer who served as commander of the Red Army's 5th Airborne Corps in 1941, the first airborne corps of the Red Army to fight in World War II after the German invasion of the Soviet Union on 22 June 1941
- Sergey Bobruk – Soviet Army lieutenant general and a Hero of the Soviet Union
- Modest Ivanovich Bogdanovich – Russian Imperial lieutenant-general and military historian
- Mikhail Bondarenko – navigator and squadron commander in the 198th Assault Aviation Regiment of the Soviet Air Forces during the Second World War who was twice awarded the title Hero of the Soviet Union for his ground-attack sorties on the Il-2 during the war
- Mikhail Grigoryevich Bondarenko – captain-lieutenant in Soviet Navy during World War II who was awarded the title Hero of the Soviet Union for his actions in the Kerch-Eltigen operation
- Mikhail Ivanovich Bondarenko (1901–1943) – artillerist of the Soviet Army during World War II
- Mariya Borovichenko – Soviet medical officer
- Stepan Borozenets – Soviet Air Force colonel and a Hero of the Soviet Union
- Ivan Boyko – commander of the 69th Guards Tank Regiment and later the 64th Guards Tank Brigade during World War II; twice awarded the title Hero of the Soviet Union for his combat leadership
- Pyotr Braiko – Soviet soldier during the Second World War who gained the status of Hero of the Soviet Union following the conflict
- Filipp Braylyan – Soviet Army major general who held divisional commands during World War II
- Alexei Burdeinei – Soviet general
- Fyodor Bursak – Russian Imperial General and an ataman (Cossack military chieftain) of the Black Sea Cossack Host
- Andrei Chabanenko – Soviet admiral, commander of the Northern Fleet
- Aleksandr Chayko – commander-in-chief of the Russian Aerospace Forces since 2026
- Yakov Cherevichenko – Soviet military leader and colonel general
- Yan Chernyak – World War II era spy who led a network of several dozen people in Germany working for the Soviet Union's military intelligence, the GRU
- Grigory Ivanovich Davidenko – Soviet reconnaissance pilot and navigator in the Baltic Fleet during the Great Patriotic War who was awarded the title Hero of the Soviet Union
- Grigory Mitrofanovich Davidenko – Soviet soldier, Hero of the Soviet Union (1944)
- Vasily Davidenko – Soviet general, Hero of the Soviet Union (1943)
- Mikhail Denisenko – Red Army Major general and Hero of the Soviet Union
- Kuzma Derevyanko – general of the Red Army. He was the representative of the Soviet Union at the ceremonial signing of the written agreement that established the armistice ending the Pacific War, and with it World War II
- Nikolai Dimidyuk - officer of the Soviet Armed Forces
- Nikolai Dokashenko – Soviet Air Force officer who fought in World War II and the Korean War
- Petro Doroshenko – hetman of Right-Bank Ukraine (1665–1672) and a Russian voivode
- Ivan Drachenko – Soviet Il-2 pilot and the only aviator awarded both the title Hero of the Soviet Union and been a full bearer of the Order of Glory
- Pavel Dubinda – sergeant in the Red Army during World War II and one of only four people that was both a full bearer of the Order of Glory and Hero of the Soviet Union
- Ivan Naumovich Dubovoy – Red Army commander during the Russian Civil War
- Ivan Dubovoy – Soviet Army major general of tank forces and a Hero of the Soviet Union
- Boris Dumenko – Red Army commander during the Russian Civil War
- Fedir Dyachenko – Soviet sniper during World War II, credited with as many as 425 kills
- Nikolay Dyatlenko – Soviet officer, interrogator and translator who was part of a team that attempted to deliver a message of truce (sometimes referred to as an "ultimatum") to the German Sixth Army at the Battle of Stalingrad in January 1943
- Galina Dzhunkovskaya – squadron navigator in 125th Guards Dive Bomber Regiment during the Second World War who was honored with the title Hero of the Soviet Union on 18 August 1945
- Ivan Fedko – Soviet Komandarm 1st rank and army commander
- Yakov Fedorenko, Soviet general during World War II
- Semyon Fedorets – Soviet Air Force officer who fought in World War II and the Korean War
- Nadezhda Fedutenko – Soviet Air Force officer and combat pilot
- Dmitry Fesenko – Soviet Komkor (corps commander)
- Sergey Fomenko, Soviet general
- Savva Fomichenko – Soviet Army major general who held divisional command during World War II
- Platon Gamaleya – Russian Imperial naval officer and navigation scientist; namesake of Gamaleya Rock, a rock formation in Antarctica
- Ilya Garkavy – Soviet komkor (corps commander)
- Grigory Ges – Soviet Air Force officer who fought in World War II and the Korean War
- Andrei Girich – Soviet Air Force major general and Hero of the Soviet Union
- Dmitry Glinka – Soviet flying ace during World War II who was twice awarded the title Hero of the Soviet Union for his achievements, having scored 50 individual aerial victories by the end of the war.
- Boris Glinka – Soviet flying ace during World War II with over 20 solo shootdowns.
- Pyotr Gnido – Soviet fighter pilot during World War II who was credited with 34 solo and 6 shared aerial victories, and recipient of the title of Hero of Soviet Union
- Aleksandr Golovko – colonel general in the Russian military and commander of the Russian Space Forces since 1 August 2015
- Arseny Golovko – Soviet admiral, whose naval service extended from the 1920s through the early Cold War
- Ivan Golubets – Soviet sailor with the Black Sea Fleet
- Filipp Gorelenko – Soviet Army lieutenant general and a Hero of the Soviet Union
- Aleksandr Gorgolyuk – Soviet fighter pilot in World War II
- Anatoly Grebenyuk - General of the Army (12.06.2006)
- Petro Grigorenko – Soviet Army commander, who in his fifties became a dissident and a writer, one of the founders of the human rights movement in the Soviet Union
- Ivan Grigorovich served as Imperial Russia's last Naval Minister from 1911 until the onset of the 1917 revolution
- Ivan Gudovich – Russian noble and military leader
- Iosif Gurko – prominent Russian field marshal during the Russo-Turkish War (1877–1878)
- Vasily Gurko – chief of staff of the Imperial Russian Army before being forced out of the country in exile following the October Revolution of 1917
- Vasyl Herasymenko – Soviet military leader
- Mikhail Ivasik – Soviet sniper in World War II who personally killed over 300 Nazis
- Stanislav Jermak – military man and rocket and space systems scientist
- Peter Kaptzevich – general who participated in the Napoleonic Wars
- Pyotr Karamushko – Red Army colonel who held division command during World War II
- Ivan Kharchenko – Soviet Army engineering colonel
- Vasily Khomenko – Soviet army commander, and lieutenant general
- Nikolai Kirtok – Soviet pilot who served during World War II
- Dmitry Klimenko – artillery officer and military commander, participant in the first and second Chechen wars, Hero of the Russian Federation (2000)
- Pavel Klimenko – major general
- Konstantin Kobets – army general
- Sergey Kobylash – military officer who has been the Commander of the Russian Air Force and a Deputy Commander-in-Chief of the Russian Aerospace Forces since July 2024
- Fyodor Kolchuk – Soviet military officer
- Trofim Kolomiets – Soviet Army commander
- Roman Kondratenko – general in the Imperial Russian Army famous for his devout defense of Port Arthur during the Russo-Japanese War of 1904–1905
- Matvey Kononenko – Soviet general
- Ivan Kopyak – Red Army major general who held division command during World War II
- Leonid Korniyets – Soviet lieutenant general during WW2, participated in Soviet partisan movement in Ukraine
- Oleg Koshevoy – Soviet partisan and one of the founders of the clandestine organization Young Guard, which fought the Nazi forces in Krasnodon during World War II between 1941 and 1945
- Pyotr Koshevoy – Soviet military commander and a Marshal of the Soviet Union
- Nikolai Kostechko – officer of the Soviet Main Intelligence Directorate (GRU) and its Russian successor, the Main Directorate of the General Staff
- Fyodor Kostenko – Soviet corps and army commander
- Pyotr Kotlyarevsky – Russian Imperial officer, known for his service in the Russo-Persian War (1804–1813), where he won many battles against Iran
- Arkady Kovachevich – Soviet flying ace and regimental commander during World War II who went on to become a general-lieutenant
- Alexander Kovalevsky (general) – Russian Imperial Lieutenant General, participant in the Caucasus campaigns and the Crimean War, military lawyer
- Yepifan Kovtyukh – Soviet corps commander
- Boris Kovzan – Soviet fighter pilot and the only person to have executed four confirmed aerial rammings, referred to as taran attacks in the Soviet Union
- Semyon Kozak – Soviet Army lieutenant general who was twice awarded the title Hero of the Soviet Union for his command of a division during World War II
- Ivan Kozhedub – Soviet World War II fighter ace, considered to be the highest-scoring Soviet and Allied fighter pilot of World War II
- Sergey Kramarenko (pilot) – Soviet Air Force officer who fought in World War II and the Korean War
- Alexander Kravchenko (revolutionary) – revolutionary, agronomist and partisan who fought against Admiral Kolchak's White forces in Siberia in 1919 during the Russian Civil War
- Andrey Kravchenko (general) – commander of multiple tank units of the Red Army throughout World War II who was twice awarded the title Hero of the Soviet Union
- Grigory Kravchenko – test pilot who became a flying ace and twice Hero of the Soviet Union in Asia before the start of Operation Barbarossa
- Ivan Yakovlevich Kravchenko – Red Army major and a Hero of the Soviet Union
- Valentina Kravchenko – squadron navigator during World War II and Hero of the Russian Federation
- Viktor Kravchuk – vice-admiral, served as commander of the Caspian Flotilla 2005–2009, and as commander of the Baltic Fleet 2012–2016
- Alexey Krivoruchko – statesman, Deputy Minister of Defense of the Russian Federation responsible for military-technical provision (armament, special and military hardware)since June 13, 2018
- Nikolai Krivoruchko – Russian and Soviet soldier
- Yevgraf Kruten – World War I flying ace credited with seven aerial victories
- Grigory Kulik – marshal of the Soviet Union
- Sergey Kuralenko – military commander serving as the Head of the Main Directorate of Military Police of the Ministry of Defense of Russia
- Pavel Kurachenko - retired Russian military officer, who served as the acting Commander-in-Chief of the Russian Aerospace Forces in 2017
- Andrey Kuzmenko (general) – the commander of the Eastern Military District from 20 April 2023 to May 2024
- Anatoly Kvochur – Soviet and Russian test pilot
- Dmitry Lavrinenko – Soviet tank commander and Hero of the Soviet Union, highest scoring tank ace of the Allies during World War II
- Ivan Sidorovich Lazarenko – Red Army major general and a posthumous Hero of the Soviet Union
- Alexander Lebed – late lieutenant general of Russia, 1996 Presidential candidate (Ukrainian origin)
- Nikita Lebedenko – Soviet Army lieutenant general and a Hero of the Soviet Union
- Nikolay Lebedenko – 20th century Imperial Russian military engineer
- Dmitry Lelyushenko, Soviet military commander, his final actions in 1945 involved directing forces during the Red Army's attacks on both Berlin and Prague.
- Anatoly Nikolayevich Levchenko – Soviet fighter pilot in the 655th Fighter Aviation Regiment of the 40th Army of the Turkestan Military District during the Soviet–Afghan War
- Gordey Levchenko – Soviet naval commander and admiral
- Irina Levchenko – medic turned tank officer in the Red Army during World War II who was awarded the title Hero of the Soviet Union in 1965; she was also the first Soviet woman awarded the Florence Nightingale Medal
- Nikolai Linevich – career military officer, General of Infantry (1903) and Adjutant general in the Imperial Russian Army in the Far East during the latter part of the Russo-Japanese War.
- Ivan Loiko – World War I flying ace credited with six confirmed aerial victories
- Dmitry Loza – Red Army Colonel and Hero of the Soviet Union
- Nikolai Lyashchenko – Soviet Army general
- Spartak Makovsky – Soviet fighter pilot and Hero of the Soviet Union who became a flying ace during World War II, tallying an estimated 25 solo and three shared shootdowns
- Alexander Marinesko – Soviet naval officer and, during World War II, the captain of the submarine S-13 which sank the German military transport ship Wilhelm Gustloff. The most successful Soviet submarine commander in terms of gross register tonnage (GRT) sunk.
- Nikolai Martynyuk – Soviet vice admiral ʖ
- Ivan Mashchenko – Red Army colonel
- Vladimir Maslyuk – Rear admiral in the Russian Navy, former chief of the Department of the Federal Service for Military-Technical Cooperation (1998–2005)
- Aleksey Mazurenko – commander of the 7th Guards Assault Aviation Regiment in the Black Sea Fleet during World War II, who was twice awarded the title Hero of the Soviet Union during the war and remained in the military afterwards, reaching the rank of General-major
- Ilya Mazuruk – Soviet pilot and polar explorer
- Ivan Mikhailichenko – Il-2 pilot in the Soviet Air Forces during the Second World War who was twice awarded the title Hero of the Soviet Union
- Alexander Mikhailovsky-Danilevsky – Russian Imperial military figure
- Vladimir Miklukha – Russian Imperial Captain 1st Rank and war hero of the Russo-Japanese War
- Alexander Mironenko – Soviet airborne senior sergeant and posthumous Hero of the Soviet Union
- Vasily Mirovich – lieutenant in the Imperial Russian Army's 25th Smolensk Infantry Regiment best known for his attempted but ultimately unsuccessful rescue of Ivan VI of Russia at Shlisselburg Fortress during the reign of Catherine the Great
- Pavel Mishchenko – Imperial Russian career military officer and statesman of the Imperial Russian Army
- Alexander Molodchy – Soviet long-range pilot who flew over 300 missions on the B-25, Il-4, and Yer-2 during World War II, WHO was the first person twice awarded the title Hero of the Soviet Union during the war while alive
- Ivan Moshlyak – Soviet major general who received the highest honorary title of Hero of the Soviet Union in 1938 for his heroism during the Battle of Lake Khasan
- Kirill Moskalenko – marshal of the Soviet Union
- Mitrofan Moskalenko – officer of the Soviet Navy
- Vasily Mykhlik – Ilyushin Il-2 pilot and squadron commander in the 566th Assault Aviation Regiment of the Soviet Air Forces during the Second World War who was twice awarded the title Hero of the Soviet Union.
- Alexander Myshlayevsky – general during World War I
- Nikolai Naumenko – Soviet military aviator who commanded the 4th Air and 15th Air Army during the Second World War.
- Stepan Naumenko – Soviet MiG-15 pilot during the Korean War, credited as the first Soviet ace in the conflict
- Anatoly Nedbaylo – Il-2 pilot in the 75th Guards Assault Aviation Regiment of the Soviet Air Forces during the Second World War who was twice awarded the title Hero of the Soviet Union
- Dmitry Neverovsky – military officer and general who served in the Russo-Turkish War and the Napoleonic Wars
- Yury Nimchenko – Russian military officer and politician serving as the senator from Crimea since 12 September 2024, was awarded the Hero of the Russian Federation title in 2022
- Yevdokiya Nosal – junior lieutenant and deputy squadron commander in the 588th Night Bomber Regiment (nicknamed the "Night Witches" by the Germans) during World War II
- Yakov Novichenko – Soviet military officer, notably protected Kim Il Sung, the first leader of North Korea, from an assassination attempt in 1946
- Grigory Okhay – Soviet Air Force officer who fought in World War II and the Korean War
- Nikolai Onoprienko – Red Army colonel and World War II Hero of the Soviet Union
- Dmitry Onuprienko – Soviet Army lieutenant general and Hero of the Soviet Union
- Alexander Osipenko (pilot) – Soviet military aviator and, according to some accounts, the Soviet Air Forces' top ace in the Spanish Civil War
- Polina Osipenko – Soviet military pilot
- Oleg Ostapenko – the former director of Roscosmos, the federal space agency, retired Colonel General in the Russian Military, former Deputy Minister of Defence, and former commander of the Aerospace Defence Forces
- Fyodor Ostashenko – Soviet Army lieutenant general and a Hero of the Soviet Union
- Andrei Paliy – naval officer who served as the deputy commander of the Black Sea Fleet
- Grigory Panchenko – Soviet Army major general and a Hero of the Soviet Union who held divisional commands during World War II
- Mikhail Panikakha – Red Army soldier
- Terentiy Parafilo – Soviet military commander
- Alexander Parkhomenko – Red Army commander during the Russian Civil War
- Feofan Parkhomenko – Soviet general
- Vasilisa Pashchenko – radio operator in the Soviet Air Force during World War II who was posthumously awarded the title Hero of the Russian Federation in 2021.
- Ivan Paskevich – Russian Imperial army Field Marshal
- Yevdokiya Pasko – Soviet military pilot
- Viktor Pavlenko – military officer in the service of the Russian Empire and both the Ukrainian Hetmanate and the Ukrainian People's Republic
- Ivan Pavlovsky – Soviet military leader, Commander-in-Chief Ground Forces – Deputy Minister of Defense of the Soviet Union (1967–1980), and a General of the Army (1967)
- Alexey Perelet – Soviet pilot who was the principal test pilot for military aircraft prototypes produced by Tupolev during World War II.
- Vasily Perovsky – Russian general and statesman
- Anatoly Petrakovsky – Soviet Army major general and Hero of the Soviet Union
- Leonid Petrovsky – Soviet lieutenant general
- Nikolai Pinchuk (pilot) – Soviet fighter pilot and flying ace during World War II who totaled 20 solo and 2 shared aerial victories
- Sergei Pinchuk – officer of the Russian Navy, currently holds the rank of vice-admiral, and is deputy commander in chief of the Black Sea Fleet
- Vasiliy Pokotilo – Governor general of Russian Turkestan from 1910 to 1911
- Konstantin Poltoratsky – Yaroslavl Military and Civil Governor (1830–1842), lieutenant general of the Imperial Russian Army, a participant of five wars, including the French invasion of Russia
- Panteleimon Ponomarenko – a Soviet statesman and politician and one of the leaders of Soviet partisan resistance during WW2
- Alexander Prokhorenko – Russian Spetsnaz officer
- Mikhail Puteiko – Red Army major general killed in action during World War II
- Yevdokiya Rachkevich – deputy regimental commander and commissar of the 46th Guards Night Bomber Aviation Regiment (a.k.a., the "Night Witches") during the Second World War
- Alexei Radzievsky – professional soldier of the Soviet Union who fought in the Second World War, commanding the 2nd Guards Tank Army during the Lublin–Brest offensive and afterwards
- Kirill Razumovski – Field marshal of Russian Imperial Army
- Alexei Razumovsky – Field marshal of Russian Imperial Army
- Nikolai Reznichenko- military officer
- Paul Rodzianko – Imperial Russian cavalry officer during WW1
- Alexander Rodzyanko – officer of the Imperial Russian Army during World War I and lieutenant-general and a corps commander of the White Army during the Russian Civil War
- Alexander Romanchuk – colonel general in the Russian Armed Forces
- Prokofy Romanenko – Soviet general
- Ivan Rubanyuk – Soviet colonel general who rose to field army command during the Cold War
- Sergei Rudenko (general) – Soviet Marshal of the aviation
- Stepan Rybalchenko – Soviet Air Force colonel-general
- Pavel Rybalko – commander of armoured troops in the Red Army during and following World War II.
- Nikolai Rybko – decorated test pilot and lead engineer of the Gromov Flight Research Institute
- Yuriy Sadovenko – army officer who served as the Deputy Minister of Defence from 2013 to 2024
- Alexander Samoylo – commander in the Imperial Russian Army and Red Army during World War I and the Russian Civil War
- Ivan Samoylovych – hetman of Left-bank Ukraine 1672–1687
- Aleksandra Samusenko – Soviet T-34 tank commander, liaison officer during World War II
- Alexey Schastny – Russian naval commander during World War I
- Nikolai Semeyko – Soviet Il-2 pilot and navigator during World War II who was twice awarded the title Hero of the Soviet Union
- Vasily Senko – Soviet Air Force colonel and the only navigator who was twice awarded the title Hero of the Soviet Union
- Yakov Sheko – Red Army Komdiv
- Sergey Sheyko – Hero of the Russian Federation, is a colonel in Russian Naval Infantry
- Anatoly Shkirko – Soviet and Russian military leader, Colonel General who served as Deputy Minister of Internal Affairs of the Russian Federation and commander-in-chief of the Internal Troops of the Ministry of Internal Affairs of Russia from 1995 to 1997
- Sergei Shtemenko – Soviet general who served as the Chief of the Soviet Armed Forces' General Staff from 1948 to 1952
- Konstantin Sidenko – admiral
- Ivan Sidorenko – Red Army officer and a Hero of the Soviet Union, who served during World War II
- Nikolai Simoniak – general in the Soviet Army during World War II
- Maxim Sinenko – Soviet Army lieutenant general of tank forces
- Grigory Skiruta – WWII Red Army officer
- Nikolai Skripko – commander of the 3rd long-range bombers' corps, then commander of the Air Force of the 5th Army and deputy commander of the Air Force of the Southwestern Front (Soviet Union)
- Alexey Skulachenko – Red Army kombrig executed during the Great Purge
- Zakhar Slyusarenko – WWII tank officer and brigade commander, twice awarded the title Hero of the Soviet Union
- Konstantin Smeshko – military commander who was deputy chief of the Engineer Troops (starting in 2017), major general
- Igor Smolyak – rear-admiral, served as commander of the Leningrad Naval Base 2015–2016, and as commander of the Nakhimov Black Sea Higher Naval School 2016–2017
- Valery Solodchuk – army officer and currently a deputy minister of defence, until 2026, he was commander of the Central Military District and joint group of forces "Center"
- Piotr Soprunenko – Soviet major-general in the Red Army who carried out the Katyn Massacre in World War II
- Mikhail Stakhursky – Soviet lieutenant general
- Dmitry Staroselsky – Russian Imperial general and bureaucrat who served as governor of Baku 1872–1875 and chief of the Administration of the Viceroy of the Caucasus 1878–1884
- Bogdan Stashinsky – KGB officer and spy who assassinated the Ukrainian nationalist leaders in the late 1950s
- Grigory Stelmakh – Soviet military commander
- Ivan Stepanenko – Soviet WWII flying ace with over 30 solo victories
- Timofei Strokach – prominent military figure of the Soviet NKVD and KGB
- Vladimir Sudets – Soviet air commander during World War II, commanding the 17th Air Army, and later became Marshal of the aviation after the war
- Stepan Suprun – Soviet test pilot who tested over 140 aircraft types during his career
- Pavel Taran – WWII Il-4 pilot, twice awarded the title Hero of the Soviet Union
- Ivan Taranenko – Soviet WWII fighter ace, later a general
- Viktor Taranovsky – major general of the First World War
- Alexander Tatarenko (general) – lieutenant general who was the commander of the 14th Air and Air Defence Forces Army of the Central Military District (2016–2020), commander of the 11th Air and Air Defence Forces Army of the Eastern Military District (2013–2015), lieutenant general (2015)
- Mitrofan Tchaikovsky – infantry general, commandant of the Ivangorod fortress, commander of the 3rd Army Corps (Russian Empire)
- Semyon Timoshenko – marshal of the Soviet Union
- Andrey Titenko – Soviet soldier who served during World War II and recipient of the title Hero of the Soviet Union
- Igor Tkachenko – military pilot with the rank of Colonel, Russian Knights group leader, Chief of the 237th Guards Aviation Showing Center of the Russian Air Force at Kubinka air base
- Grigory Tkhor – Soviet aviator, Spanish Civil War and Second Sino-Japanese War volunteer, and major general of the Soviet Air Force
- Ivan Tretyak – Soviet general who served in various positions in the Soviet Armed Forces including as commander of the Soviet Air Defence Forces
- Sergei Trofimenko – Soviet military commander, active in the Russian Civil War and Second World War
- Yefim Trotsenko – Colonel-general of Soviet Union
- Mikhail Tsiselsky – Soviet naval pilot during World War II who was awarded the title Hero of the Soviet Union
- Nikolai Tsymbal – Soviet military officer
- Erast Tsytovich – Imperial Russian military commander
- Ivan Turkenich – Soviet partisan, one of the leaders of the underground anti-Nazi organization Young Guard, which operated in Krasnodon district during World War II between 1941 and 1944
- Yuriy Tyutyunnyk – Russian Imperial Officer
- Yelena Ubiyvovk – WWII partisan and leader of a Komsomol cell
- Nina Ulyanenko – navigator, pilot and flight commander in the women's 46th Taman Guards Night Bomber Aviation Regiment
- Matvei Usenko – major general of the Red Army during the Second World War
- Nikolai Usenko – Red Army soldier, Hero of the Soviet Union
- Alexander Utvenko – Red Army lieutenant general
- Grigory Vakulenchuk – sailor, organizer, and leader of the uprising on the Russian battleship Potemkin
- Matvei Vasilenko – Soviet komkor (corps commander)
- Pyotr Vershigora – a leader of the Soviet partisan movement in Ukraine, Belarus and Poland
- Ivan Vertelko – officer of the Soviet military who held a number of posts in the Soviet Tank Forces, and later the Soviet Border Forces, reaching the rank of colonel general
- Aleksandr Vitko – retired officer of the Russian Navy, former commander of the Russian Black Sea Fleet between April 2013 and June 2018
- Andrey Vitruk – Soviet Air Force general
- Ilya Vlasenko – Hero of the Soviet Union (1943)
- Aleksey Vlasenko – Soviet general
- Nikolai Volodchenko - Lieutenant-General of the Imperial Russian Army, in 1917 was the commander-in-chief of the Southwestern front
- Vladimir Sergeyevich Vysotsky – Russian admiral and Commander of the Russian Northern Fleet
- Władysław Wejtko – general of the Imperial Russian Army
- Vasily Yakovenko – Soviet military commander and politician who organised Red Army partisan divisions in Siberia during the Russian Civil War
- Vasili Yanchenko – World War I flying ace credited with 16 aerial victories
- Nikolai Yegipko – Soviet Navy officer, Hero of the Soviet Union
- Andrey Yeryomenko – Soviet general during World War II and, subsequently, a Marshal of the Soviet Union
- Aleksei Gordeyevich Yeryomenko (1906–1942), Soviet military officer pictured in a famous World War II photograph
- Dimitri Mikhailovich Youzefovitch – Russian nobleman from the Poltava region, most notable for serving as a general in the Napoleonic Wars, especially his leadership of the force which besieged Metz in 1814
- Maksym Zalizniak – Cossack and leader of the Koliivshchyna rebellion
- Ivan Zaporozhets – Soviet security officer and official of the OGPU-NKVD
- Vasily Zavoyko – admiral in the Russian Imperial navy; in 1854, during the Crimean War, led the successful defence against the Siege of Petropavlovsk by the allied British-French troops
- Yekaterina Zelenko – WWII Soviet Su-2 pilot, flew during Winter War
- Pavel Zelenoy – admiral, governor of Taganrog and Odessa
- Gennady Zhidko – colonel general of the Russian Armed Forces, was awarded the title Hero of the Russian Federation in 2017 for his service as chief of staff of Russian forces deployed to Syria
- Yevgeniya Zhigulenko – WWII Soviet Air Force pilot and navigator, Hero of the Soviet Union
- Filipp Zhmachenko – Soviet Army general, Hero of the Soviet Union
- Nikolai Zhugan – Air Force major general, pilot during World War II, and Hero of the Soviet Union (1944)
- Fedor Zinchenko – Soviet officer who commanded the 150th Rifle Division's 756th Regiment during the Storming of the Reichstag
- Fyodor Zozulya – admiral of the Soviet Navy
- Georgy Zozulya – WWII ground-attack pilot in the Soviet Air Force
- Mikhail Zusko - Commander of the 58th Combined Arms Army of the Southern Military District (August 2020 – June 2022), Lieutenant General (2021)

=== Business ===
- Oleksiy Alchevsky – industrialist, established the first finance group in Russia.
- Viktor Bout – arms dealer
- Leonid Fedun – billionaire businessman
- Dmitry Gerasimenko – businessman, industrialist
- Vladimir Ivanenko – businessman, founded first private cable and television network in USSR
- Boris Kamenka – entrepreneur and banker in the Russian Empire. He was one of the richest people in Russia before the Russian Revolution.
- Artur Kirilenko – entrepreneur, property developer
- Mikhail Kovalchuk – physicist and official
- Yury Kovalchuk – billionaire businessman and financier "reputed to be Vladimir Putin's personal banker"
- Vladimir Kovalevsky – statesman, scientist and entrepreneur
- Serhiy Kurchenko – businessman and founder/owner of the group of companies "Gas Ukraine 2009" specializing in trading of liquefied natural gas. Kurchenko is also the former owner and president of FC Metalist Kharkiv and the Ukrainian Media Holding group.Since 2014 lives in Russia.
- Sergei Magnitsky – Ukrainian-born Russian tax advisor and prisoner
- Andrey Melnichenko – billionaire entrepreneur
- Alexander Ponomarenko – billionaire businessman who made his fortune in banking, sea ports, commercial real estate and airport construction
- Petro Prokopovych – founder of commercial beekeeping and the inventor of the first movable frame hive
- Vladimir Stolyarenko – banker
- Viacheslav Suprunenko – major shareholder of ASVIO BANK, owner of asset management company ASVIO and president of law firm Pravozahisnyk

=== Other ===
- Gennady Alferenko
- Valeria Ivanenko
- Oleksandr Opanasenko
- Anastasia Prokopenko
- Nikolai Usenko
- Kostyantyn Zhevago

== See also ==
- Russia–Ukraine relations
- Demographics of Russia
- Ukrainian diaspora
- Russians in Ukraine
- Ukrainians in Siberia

== Bibliography ==
- Kubiyovych, Volodymyr. Entsykolpedia Ukrainoznavstva. Vol. 7.
- Українське козацтво – Енциклопедія – Kyiv, 2006
- Zaremba, S. (1993). From the national-cultural life of Ukrainians in the Kuban (1920 and 1930s). Kyivska starovyna. pp. 94–104.
- Lanovyk, B.; et al. (1999). Ukrainian Emigration: from the past to the present. Ternopil.
- Petrenko, Y. (1993). Ukrainian cossackdom. Kyivska starovyna. pp. 114–119.
- Польовий Р. Кубанська Україна К. Дiокор 2003.
- Ratuliak, V. (1996). Notes from the history of Kuban from historic times until 1920. Krasnodar.
- Сергійчук В. Українізація Росії К. 2000
- Internet site for Ukrainians in Russia
- Зав'ялов А. В. Соціальна адаптація українських іммігрантів : монографія / А. В. Зав'ялов. — Київ : Саміт-книга, 2020. — 180 с.
- Завьялов А. В. Социальная адаптация украинских иммигрантов : монография / А. В. Завьялов. – Иркутск : Изд-во ИГУ, 2017. – 179 с.
