= Eastern constituency (Krasnodar Krai) =

Eastern single-member constituency
- Constituency of the Russian State Duma
- Deputy: Alexey Yezubov; United Russia
- Federal subject: Krasnodar Krai
- Districts: Beloglinsky, Gulkevichsky, Vyselkovsky, Kavkazsky, Korenovsky, Novopokrovsky (Ilyinskaya, Kubansky, Novopokrovskaya, Novopokrovsky),, Tbilissky, Tikhoretsky, Ust-Labinsky
- Voters: 508,385 (2026)

The Eastern constituency (No.56 (Note: Tikhoretsk constituency No.44 in 1993–1995, Tikhoretsk constituency No.43 in 1995–2003, Tikhoretsk constituency No.45 in 2003–2007, Tikhoretsk constituency No.51 in 2016–2026)) is a Russian legislative constituency in Krasnodar Krai. The constituency covers rural eastern Krasnodar Krai.

The constituency has been represented since 2016 by United Russia deputy Alexey Yezubov, a five-term State Duma member and former Basic Element executive.

== Boundaries ==
1993–2003 Tikhoretsk constituency: Beloglinsky District, Kavkazsky District, Korenovsky District, Kropotkin, Novopokrovsky District, Pavlovsky District, Tbilissky District, Tikhoretsk, Tikhoretsky District, Ust-Labinsky District, Vyselkovsky District
The constituency covered agriculture heavy eastern Krasnodar Krai, including the towns of Kropotkin and Tikhoretsk.

2003–2007 Tikhoretsk constituency: Beloglinsky District, Gulkevichsky District, Kavkazsky District, Kropotkin, Novopokrovsky District, Tbilissky District, Tikhoretsk, Tikhoretsky District, Ust-Labinsky District, Vyselkovsky District
After 2003 redistricting the constituency was slightly changed, losing Korenovsky District to Dinskaya constituency. The constituency gained Gulkevichsky District from Armavir constituency.

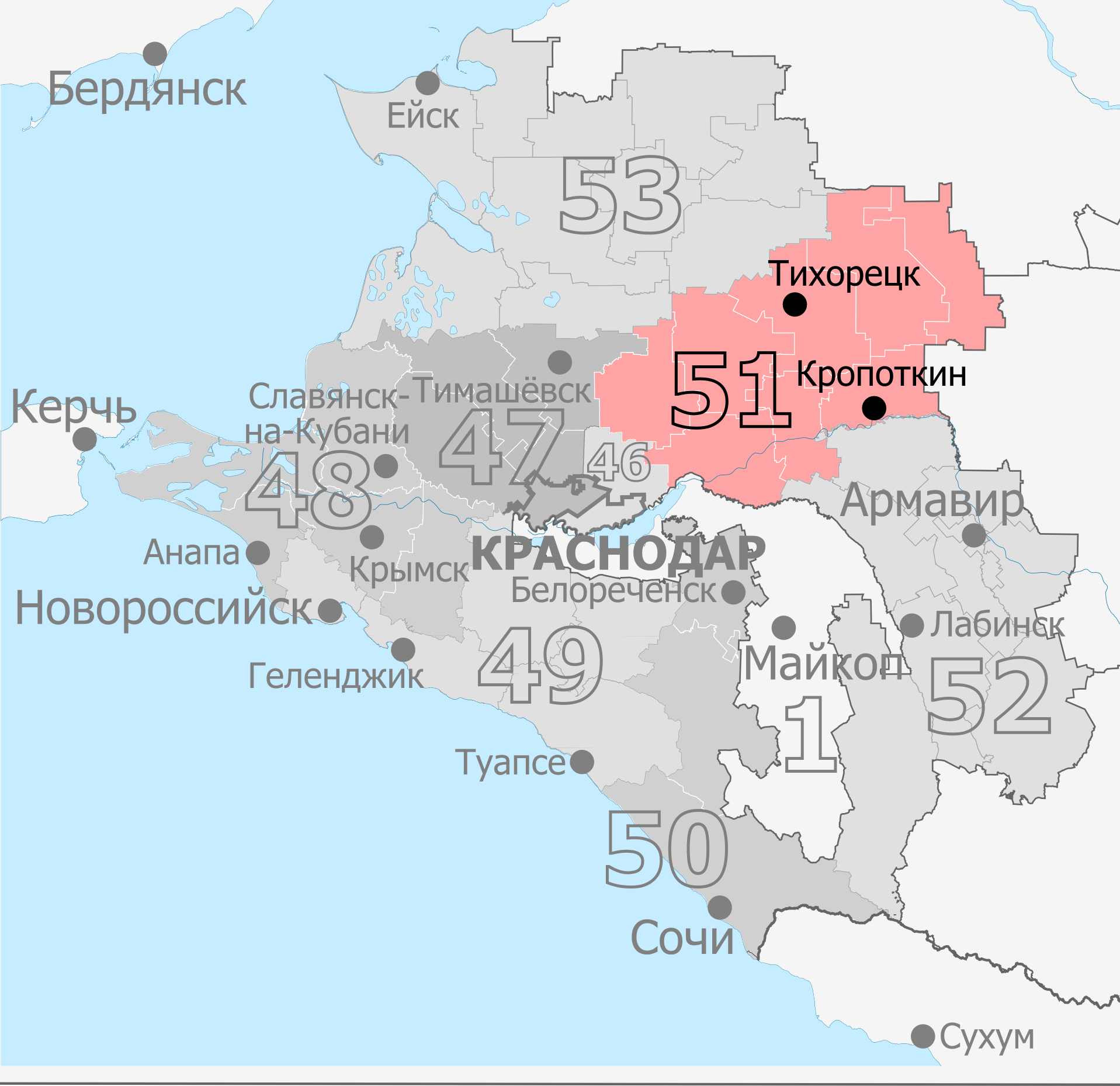
Constituency boundaries from 2016 to 2026

2016–2026 Tikhoretsk constituency: Beloglinsky District, Kavkazsky District, Korenovsky District, Novopokrovsky District, Tbilissky District, Tikhoretsky District, Ust-Labinsky District, Vyselkovsky District
The constituency was re-created for the 2016 election. This seat was drawn in its 1993–2003 configuration, losing Gulkevichsky District to Armavir constituency and gaining Korenovsky District from Dinskaya constituency.

2026–present: Beloglinsky District, Gulkevichsky District, Kavkazsky District, Korenovsky District, Novopokrovsky District (Ilyinskaya, Kubansky, Novopokrovskaya, Novopokrovsky), Tbilissky District, Tikhoretsky District, Ust-Labinsky District, Vyselkovsky District
The constituency was slightly altered after the 2025 redistricting, losing northern half of Novopokrovsky District to Kanevskaya constituency. This seat regained Gulkevichsky District from Armavir constituency and was renamed "Eastern constituency".

== Members elected ==
By-election are shown in italics.

Election	Member	Party
1993	Nadezhda Verveyko	Independent
1995	Aleksandr Tkachyov (Note: elected as Governor of Krasnodar Krai in December 2000)	Independent
1999	Aleksandr Tkachyov	Communist Party
2001	Nikolay Denisov	Independent
2003	Aleksey Tkachyov	Independent
2007	Proportional representation - no election by constituency	
2011	Proportional representation - no election by constituency	
2016	Alexey Yezubov	United Russia
2021	Alexey Yezubov	United Russia
2026	Alexey Yezubov	United Russia

== Election results ==
=== 1993 ===
==== Declared candidates ====
- Nikolay Belobritsky (APR), sovkhoz director
- Gennady Benov (CPRF), former People's Deputy of Russia (1990–1993), retired Soviet Air Force lieutenant general
- Aleksandr Fendrikov (Civic Union), machine building plant director general
- Yaroslav Matchak (Independent), Mayor of Kropotkin, former People's Deputy of Russia (1990–1993) (previously ran as PRES candidate)
- Vyacheslav Nekhay (Choice of Russia), businessman
- Vladimir Onopriyev (Independent), former People's Deputy of Russia (1990–1993), rector of Kuban State Medical University (1991–present)
- Nadezhda Verveyko (Independent), attorney
- Aleksandr Yermakov (DPR), gynecologist

==== Results ====
Summary of the 12 December 1993 Russian legislative election in the Tikhoretsk constituency
Candidate	Party	Votes	%
Nadezhda Verveyko	Independent	45,042	14.94%
Gennady Benov	Communist Party	44,525	14.77%
Nikolay Belobritsky	Agrarian Party	42,282	14.03%
Vladimir Onopriyev	Independent	36,737	12.19%
Aleksandr Fendrikov	Civic Union	33,951	11.26%
Vyacheslav Nekhay	Choice of Russia	18,446	6.12%
Aleksandr Yermakov	Democratic Party	17,146	5.69%
Yaroslav Matchak	Independent	14,385	4.77%
against all		29,835	9.90%
Total		301,399	100%

=== 1995 ===
==== Declared candidates ====
- Vladimir Girig (Independent), industrial executive
- Leonid Golubenko (Independent), farmer
- Konstantin Gorovoy (LDPR), Member of Legislative Assembly of Krasnodar Krai (1994–present)
- Aleksandr Kofanov (PPR–ST), trade union leader
- Nikolay Kondratenko (Independent), Member of Federation Council (1994–present), tobacco executive
- Nikolay Kotov (APR), Member of State Duma (1994–present)
- Mikhail Kovalyov (CPRF), middle school teacher
- Vladislav Spiridonov (Independent), tourism businessman
- Aleksandr Tkachyov (Independent), Member of Legislative Assembly of Krasnodar Krai (1994–present), agriculture businessman
- Nadezhda Verveyko (V–N!), incumbent Member of State Duma (1994–present)

==== Results ====
Summary of the 17 December 1995 Russian legislative election in the Tikhoretsk constituency
Candidate	Party	Votes	%
Aleksandr Tkachyov	Independent	82,028	23.24%
Nikolay Kondratenko	Independent	73,901	20.94%
Mikhail Kovalyov	Communist Party	72,523	20.55%
Konstantin Gorovoy	Liberal Democratic Party	42,914	12.16%
Vladislav Spiridonov	Independent	24,239	6.87%
Nadezhda Verveyko (incumbent)	Power to the People!	12,899	3.66%
Vladimir Girich	Independent	8,203	2.32%
Leonid Golubenko	Independent	5,707	1.62%
Nikolay Kotov	Agrarian Party	5,253	1.49%
Aleksandr Kofanov	Trade Unions and Industrialists – Union of Labour	2,295	0.65%
against all		1,813	5.16%
Total		352,885	100%

=== 1999 ===
==== Declared candidates ====
- Sergey Danilenko (Independent), attorney
- Natalia Motyzheva (RSP), nonprofit executive
- Grigory Pogrebnoy (NDR), chairman of the party regional executive committee, Great Patriotic War veteran
- Zinaida Rakhno (Independent), construction executive
- Aleksandr Tkachyov (CPRF), incumbent Member of State Duma (1996–present)
- Nikolay Turekov (LDPR), businessman

==== Failed to qualify ====
- Vladimir Madonov (Nikolayev–Fyodorov Bloc), nonprofit director
- Nadezhda Verveyko (Independent), former Member of State Duma (1994–1995)

==== Did not file ====
- Sergey Bugayenko (DN)
- Igor Prisyazhnyuk (KTR–zSS), prosecutor

==== Results ====
Summary of the 19 December 1999 Russian legislative election in the Tikhoretsk constituency
Candidate	Party	Votes	%
Aleksandr Tkachyov (incumbent)	Communist Party	240,540	70.98%
Zinaida Rakhno	Independent	20,329	6.00%
Sergey Danilenko	Independent	18,073	5.33%
Nikolay Turekov	Liberal Democratic Party	14,063	4.15%
Natalia Motyzheva	Russian Socialist Party	8,954	2.64%
Grigory Pogrebnoy	Our Home – Russia	4,962	1.46%
against all		27,907	8.24%
Total		338,877	100%

=== 2001 ===
==== Declared candidates ====
- Sergey Danilenko (Independent), attorney, 1999 candidate for this seat
- Gennady Deminenko (Independent), Deputy Chairman of the Moscow Committee on Labor and Employment
- Nikolay Denisov (Independent), aide to Governor of Krasnodar Krai Aleksandr Tkachyov
- Aleksey Guzeyev (Independent), lawyer
- Marina Meshcheryakova (Independent), oil businesswoman
- Natalia Motyzheva (Independent), nonprofit executive, 1999 candidate for this seat
- Tatyana Pavlovskaya (Independent), journalist

==== Did not file ====
- Andrey Chaltsev (Independent)
- Mikhail Kovalyov (Independent), middle school teacher, 1995 candidate for this seat

==== Results ====
Summary of the 20 May 2001 by-election in the Tikhoretsk constituency
Candidate	Party	Votes	%
Nikolay Denisov	Independent	87,480	58.83%
Tatyana Pavlovskaya	Independent	15,019	10.10%
Marina Meshcheryakova	Independent	14,348	9.65%
Sergey Danilenko	Independent	11,211	7.54%
Natalia Motyzheva	Independent	5,380	3.62%
Gennady Deminenko	Independent	2,702	1.82%
Aleksey Guzeyev	Independent	1,677	1.13%
against all		9,027	6.07%
Total		148,701	100%

=== 2003 ===
==== Declared candidates ====
- Gennady Deminenko (PVR-RPZh), Deputy Chairman of the Moscow Committee on Labor and Employment, 2001 candidate for this seat
- Sergey Kryuchin (LDPR), Member of Kropotkin Duma, agriculture businessman
- Zinaida Rakhno (Yabloko), pensioner, 1995 candidate for this seat
- Anatoly Shalimov (ORP Rus'), businessman
- Aleksey Tkachyov (Independent), Member of Legislative Assembly of Krasnodar Krai (2002–present), agriculture businessman, brother of Governor of Krasnodar Krai Aleksandr Tkachyov (previously ran as United Russia candidate)

==== Did not file ====
- Nikolay Denisov (CPRF), incumbent Member of State Duma (2001–present)
- Ivan Lakhvich (Independent), pensioner

==== Results ====
Summary of the 7 December 2003 Russian legislative election in the Tikhoretsk constituency
Candidate	Party	Votes	%
Aleksey Tkachyov	Independent	188,105	67.32%
Sergey Kryuchin	Liberal Democratic Party	22,677	8.12%
Zinaida Rakhno	Yabloko	16,758	6.00%
Gennady Deminenko	Party of Russia's Rebirth-Russian Party of Life	6,156	2.20%
Anatoly Shalimov	United Russian Party Rus'	4,463	1.60%
against all		36,696	13.13%
Total		279,545	100%

=== 2016 ===
==== Declared candidates ====
- Vladimir Karpekin (A Just Russia), businessman
- Ilya Khalin (CPCR), Tikhoretsk station wagon maintenance foreman
- Lyudmila Lindblad (Rodina), corporate executive
- Aleksandr Nagnibeda (CPRF), former Member of Legislative Assembly of Krasnodar Krai (2002–2007)
- Nikolay Sytnik (LDPR), aide to State Duma member Anatoly Sikorsky
- Denis Vashchenko (Party of Growth), businessman
- Alexey Yezubov (United Russia), Member of State Duma (2007–present)

==== Declined ====
- Aleksandr Shustenkov (United Russia), Member of Legislative Assembly of Krasnodar Krai (2002–present) (lost the primary)

==== Results ====
Summary of the 18 September 2016 Russian legislative election in the Tikhoretsk constituency
Candidate	Party	Votes	%
Alexey Yezubov	United Russia	197,102	67.69%
Aleksandr Nagnibeda	Communist Party	28,336	9.38%
Nikolay Sytnik	Liberal Democratic Party	22,848	7.85%
Vladimir Karpekin	A Just Russia	15,510	5.33%
Denis Vashchenko	Party of Growth	8,955	3.08%
Ilya Khalin	Communists of Russia	7,409	2.54%
Lyudmila Lindblad	Rodina	6,873	2.36%
Total		291,168	100%

=== 2021 ===
==== Declared candidates ====
- Artyom Belobritsky (CPRF), Member of Vyselkovsky District Council (2020–present), agricultural executive
- Valery Chayevsky (RPPSS), homemaker
- Gennady Dergachev (LDPR), Member of Tuapse Council (2017–present), aide to Legislative Assembly of Krasnodar Krai member
- Svetlana Konovalova (Yabloko), party chairwoman in Korenovsky District
- Sergey Kusmakov (New People), nonprofit executive, perennial candidate
- Roman Shpakov (Party of Growth), Ust-Labinsk Administration staffer
- Nikolay Sytnik (SR–ZP), community activist, 2016 LDPR candidate for this seat
- Maksim Yasenetsky (GP), unemployed
- Alexey Yezubov (United Russia), incumbent Member of State Duma (2007–present)

==== Results ====
Summary of the 17–19 September 2021 Russian legislative election in the Tikhoretsk constituency
Candidate	Party	Votes	%
Alexey Yezubov (incumbent)	United Russia	278,780	72.76%
Artyom Belobritsky	Communist Party	41,153	10.74%
Nikolay Sytnik	A Just Russia — For Truth	15,855	4.14%
Gennady Dergachev	Liberal Democratic Party	15,229	3.97%
Sergey Kusmakov	New People	12,621	3.29%
Svetlana Konovalova	Yabloko	5,734	1.50%
Valery Chayevsky	Party of Pensioners	4,662	1.22%
Roman Shpakov	Party of Growth	3,768	0.98%
Maksim Yasnetsky	Civic Platform	2,131	0.56%
Total		383,154	100%

=== 2026 ===
==== Declared candidates ====
- Anton Kuligin (New People), Member of Tikhoretsk Council (2022–present), Russian Army officer
- Denis Labeko (The Greens), Member of Labinsk Council (2024–present), municipal sports school director
- Aleksey Moryakhin (A Just Russia), municipal stadium deputy head
- Eduard Varlashkin (CPRF), aide to State Duma member Nikolay Osadchy
- Alexey Yezubov (United Russia), incumbent Member of State Duma (2007–present)
- Igor Zubarev (LDPR), middle school deputy principal

==== Results ====
Summary of the 18-20 September 2026 Russian legislative election in the Eastern constituency
Candidate	Party	Votes	%
Alexey Yezubov (incumbent)	United Russia	309,907	73.22%
Eduard Varlashkin	Communist Party	42,512	10.04%
Anton Kuligin	New People	27,792	6.57%
Igor Zubarev	Liberal Democratic Party	23,387	5.53%
Aleksey Moryakhin	A Just Russia	10,453	2.47%
Denis Labeko	The Greens	6,825	1.61%
Total		423,237	100%
