= Bratsky (rural locality) =

Bratsky (Russian: Братский; masculine), Bratskaya (Братская; feminine), or Bratskoye (Братское; neuter) is the name of several rural localities in Russia:

- Bratsky, Republic of Bashkortostan, a village in Ivano-Kazansky Selsoviet of Iglinsky District of the Republic of Bashkortostan
- Bratsky, Kaluga Oblast, a settlement in Zhizdrinsky District of Kaluga Oblast
- Bratsky, Gulkevichsky District, Krasnodar Krai, a khutor in Tysyachny Rural Okrug of Gulkevichsky District of Krasnodar Krai
- Bratsky, Korenovsky District, Krasnodar Krai, a settlement in Novoberezansky Rural Okrug of Korenovsky District of Krasnodar Krai
- Bratsky, Labinsky District, Krasnodar Krai, a khutor in Pervosinyukhinsky Rural Okrug of Labinsky District of Krasnodar Krai
- Bratsky, Tikhoretsky District, Krasnodar Krai, a settlement in Bratsky Rural Okrug of Tikhoretsky District of Krasnodar Krai
- Bratsky, Ust-Labinsky District, Krasnodar Krai, a khutor in Bratsky Rural Okrug of Ust-Labinsky District of Krasnodar Krai
- Bratsky, Yeysky District, Krasnodar Krai, a settlement in Yeysky Rural Okrug of Yeysky District of Krasnodar Krai
- Bratsky, Orenburg Oblast, a settlement in Dimitrovsky Selsoviet of Ileksky District of Orenburg Oblast
- Bratsky, Oryol Oblast, a settlement in Vysokinsky Selsoviet of Mtsensky District of Oryol Oblast
- Bratsky, Rostov Oblast, a khutor in Ilyinovskoye Rural Settlement of Martynovsky District of Rostov Oblast
- Bratsky, Samara Oblast, a settlement in Krasnoarmeysky District of Samara Oblast
- Bratsky, Saratov Oblast, a settlement in Ivanteyevsky District of Saratov Oblast
- Bratsky, Volgograd Oblast, a khutor in Krepinsky Selsoviet of Kalachyovsky District of Volgograd Oblast
- Bratskoye, Chechen Republic, a selo in Nadterechny District of the Chechen Republic
- Bratskoye, Krasnodar Krai, a selo in Glebovsky Rural Okrug of Kushchyovsky District of Krasnodar Krai
- Bratskoye, Oryol Oblast, a village in Kotovsky Selsoviet of Sverdlovsky District of Oryol Oblast
- Bratskoye, Saratov Oblast, a selo in Arkadaksky District of Saratov Oblast
- Bratskoye, Krasnokholmsky District, Tver Oblast, a village in Krasnokholmsky District, Tver Oblast
- Bratskoye, Udomelsky District, Tver Oblast, a village in Udomelsky District, Tver Oblast
- Bratskoye, Sokolsky District, Vologda Oblast, a village in Zamoshsky Selsoviet of Sokolsky District of Vologda Oblast
- Bratskoye, Velikoustyugsky District, Vologda Oblast, a village in Opoksky Selsoviet of Velikoustyugsky District of Vologda Oblast
- Bratskoye, Vologodsky District, Vologda Oblast, a village in Kubensky Selsoviet of Vologodsky District of Vologda Oblast
- Bratskoye, Yaroslavl Oblast, a village in Beloselsky Rural Okrug of Poshekhonsky District of Yaroslavl Oblast
