= 2022 Krasnodar Krai Legislative Assembly election =

- 9–11 September 2022
- Turnout: 53.31%
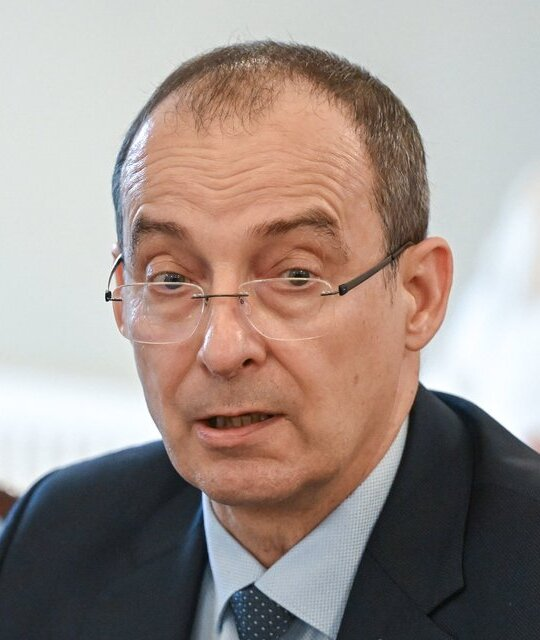

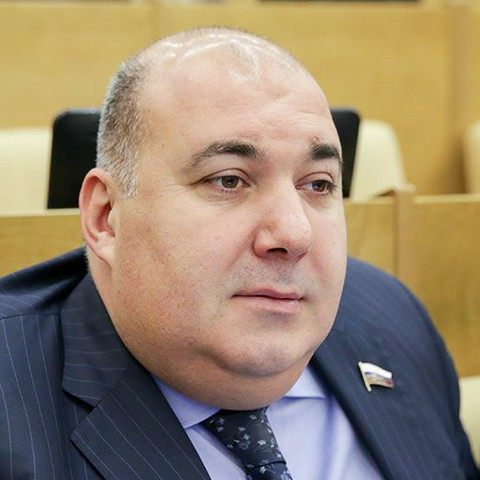
	Majority party	Minority party	Third party
		CPRF
Candidate	Yury Burlachko	Aleksandr Safronov	Yury Napso
Leader	Dmitry Medvedev	Gennady Zyuganov	Leonid Slutsky
Party	United Russia	CPRF	LDPR
Last election	60 seats, 70.78%	3 seats, 11.53%	3 seats, 11.15%
Seats won	62	2	3
Seat change	▲2	▼1	0
Popular vote	1,636,842	248,784	153,219
Percentage	70.80%	10.76%	6.63%
Swing	▲0.02%	▼0.77%	▼4.52%
	Fourth party	Fifth party	Sixth party
	SR-ZP	NL	PR
Candidate	Denis Khmelevskoy	Nikita Sirazetdinov	Yulia Parkhomenko
Leader	Sergey Mironov	Aleksey Nechayev	Boris Titov
Party	SR-ZP	New People	Party of Growth
Last election	1 seat, 3.46%	Did not exist	1 seat
Seats won	2	0	1
Seat change	▲1	Did not exist	0
Popular vote	133,522	112,263	None
Percentage	5.78%	4.86%	None
Swing	▲2.32%	Did not exist	None

The 2022 Legislative Assembly of Krasnodar Krai election took place on 9–11 September 2022, on common election day. All 70 seats in the Legislative Assembly were up for reelection.

== Electoral system ==
Under current election laws, the Legislative Assembly is elected for a term of five years, with parallel voting. 25 seats are elected by party-list proportional representation with a 5% electoral threshold, with the other half elected in 45 single-member constituencies by first-past-the-post voting. Until 2022 the number of mandates allocated in proportional and majoritarian parts were standing at 35 each. Seats in the proportional part are allocated using the Imperiali quota, modified to ensure that every party list, which passes the threshold, receives at least one mandate.

== Candidates ==
=== Party lists ===
To register regional lists of candidates, parties need to collect 0.5% of signatures of all registered voters in Krasnodar Krai.

The following parties were relieved from the necessity to collect signatures:

- United Russia
- Communist Party of the Russian Federation
- A Just Russia — Patriots — For Truth
- Liberal Democratic Party of Russia
- New People

No.	Party	Krai-wide list	Candidates	Territorial groups	Status
1	A Just Russia — For Truth	Denis Khmelevskoy • Gennady Ufimtsev • Aleksandr Uvarov	49	45	Registered
2	Communist Party	Aleksandr Safronov • Pavel Sokolenko • Ivan Zhilishchikov	125	45	Registered
3	United Russia	Yury Burlachko • Vladimir Beketov • Vladimir Porkhanov	97	45	Registered
4	Liberal Democratic Party	Yury Napso • Ivan Tutushkin • Batyrbiy Panesh	89	45	Registered
5	New People	Nikita Sirazetdinov • Viktor Timofeyev • Pyotr Savelyev	45	45	Registered
	Rodina	Vladislav Zalevsky	31	30	Failed to qualify (Did not file)

New People will take part in Krasnodar Krai legislative election for the first time, while Communists of Russia, who participated in the 2017 election, did not file its party list in 2022.

=== Single-mandate constituencies ===
45 single-mandate constituencies were formed in Krasnodar Krai, an increase of 10 seats since last redistricting in 2017.

To register candidates in single-mandate constituencies need to collect 3% of signatures of registered voters in the constituency.

Number of candidates in single-mandate constituencies
Party	Candidates	
Party	Nominated	Registered
United Russia	41	41
Communist Party	45	45
Liberal Democratic Party	45	44
A Just Russia — For Truth	45	43
New People	42	41
Civic Platform	3	1
Party of Growth	1	1
Rodina	1	1
Party of Pensioners	1	0
Independent	8	0
Total	232	218

== Results ==
Summary of the 9–11 September 2022 Legislative Assembly of Krasnodar Krai election results
Party	Party list					Constituency		Total	
Party	Votes	%	±pp	Seats	+/–	Seats	+/–	Seats	+/–
United Russia	1,636,842	70.80	▲0.02%	21	▼8	41	▲10	62	▲2
Communist Party	248,784	10.76	▼0.77%	2	▼1	0	Steady	2	▼1
Liberal Democratic Party	153,219	6.63	▼4.52%	1	▼2	2	▲2	3	0
A Just Russia — For Truth	133,522	5.78	▲2.32%	1	▲1	1	0	2	▲1
New People	112,263	4.86	New	0	New	0	New	0	New
Party of Growth	—	—	—	—	—	1	0	1	0
Rodina	—	—	—	—	—	0	New	0	New
Civic Platform	—	—	—	—	—	0	New	0	New
Invalid ballots	27,438	1.19	▼0.35%	—	—	—	—	—	—
Total	2,312,070	100.00	—	25	▼10	45	▲10	70	Steady
Turnout	2,312,070	53.31	▲11.28%	—	—	—	—	—	—
Registered voters	4,336,930	100.00	—	—	—	—	—	—	—

Summary of the 9–11 September 2022 Legislative Assembly of Krasnodar Krai election results by constituency
No.	Candidate	Party	Votes	%
1	Vladislav Graf-Kolesnik	A Just Russia — For Truth	12,750	64.41%
1	Ivan Zhilishchikov	Communist Party	3,040	15.36%
1	Vladimir Kopylov	New People	2,266	11.45%
1	Nikolay Kostikov	Liberal Democratic Party	1,018	5.14%
1	Total		19,795	100%
1	Source:			
2	Ivan Tutushkin	Liberal Democratic Party	6,471	48.28%
2	Dmitry Kolomiyets	Communist Party	3,070	22.91%
2	Tatyana Arkadyeva	A Just Russia — For Truth	2,027	15.12%
2	Aleksey Ushakov	New People	1,114	8.31%
2	Total		13,403	100%
2	Source:			
3	Stanislav Grinev	United Russia	14,371	62.90%
3	Dmitry Chugunov	Communist Party	3,293	14.41%
3	Stanislav Dombrovsky	A Just Russia — For Truth	2,078	9.09%
3	Natalya Gvozdeva	Liberal Democratic Party	1,523	6.67%
3	Nikita Sirazetdinov	New People	1,174	5.14%
3	Total		22,848	100%
3	Source:			
4	Stanislav Nikolenko	United Russia	17,253	70.45%
4	Sergey Kovalev	Communist Party	2,700	11.02%
4	Igor Onegov	A Just Russia — For Truth	2,017	8.24%
4	Yevgeny Odin	New People	1,202	4.91%
4	Svetlana Yakimenko	Liberal Democratic Party	1,031	4.21%
4	Total		24,490	100%
4	Source:			
5	Igor Bragarnik	United Russia	15,024	70.02%
5	Aleksandr Latkin	Communist Party	2,750	12.82%
5	Sofia Kiseleva	New People	1,793	8.36%
5	Andrey Kireyev	Liberal Democratic Party	1,473	6.86%
5	Total		21,458	100%
5	Source:			
6	Aleksandr Trubilin (incumbent)	United Russia	16,821	68.28%
6	Pavel Yemtsov	Communist Party	3,374	13.70%
6	Aleksandr Veselov	A Just Russia — For Truth	1,529	6.21%
6	Lyubov Rusina	Liberal Democratic Party	1,302	5.29%
6	Sergey Kamarinsky	New People	1,191	4.83%
6	Total		24,634	100%
6	Source:			
7	Galina Golovchenko	United Russia	7,947	51.55%
7	Yury Gudkov	Communist Party	3,090	20.04%
7	Roman Aksenov	A Just Russia — For Truth	1,446	9.38%
7	Aleksandr Artemenko	New People	1,020	6.62%
7	Irina Kovaleva	Liberal Democratic Party	788	5.11%
7	Sergey Voskoboynikov	Civic Platform	678	4.40%
7	Total		15,417	100%
7	Source:			
8	Aleksey Buzmakov	United Russia	11,247	75.77%
8	Yekaterina Ludilshchikova	Communist Party	1,184	7.98%
8	Sergey Konovalov	A Just Russia — For Truth	941	6.34%
8	Yelena Telenkova	Liberal Democratic Party	610	4.11%
8	Viktoria Kurilenko	New People	590	3.97%
8	Total		14,844	100%
8	Source:			
9	Nikolay Lobachev	United Russia	23,407	66.18%
9	Vitaly Grigorov	Communist Party	7,837	22.16%
9	Vladislav Kuznetsov	A Just Russia — For Truth	1,800	5.09%
9	Maksim Kislyakov	New People	1,062	3.00%
9	Pavel Shevchenko	Liberal Democratic Party	1,012	2.86%
9	Total		35,369	100%
9	Source:			
10	Andrey Doroshev	United Russia	14,798	70.29%
10	Aleksey Pokruchin	Communist Party	2,482	11.79%
10	Gennady Ufimtsev	A Just Russia — For Truth	1,649	7.83%
10	Svetlana Zaytseva	Liberal Democratic Party	1,015	4.82%
10	Vladimir Stepanov	New People	823	3.91%
10	Total		21,052	100%
10	Source:			
11	Ivan Artemenko (incumbent)	United Russia	48,672	78.63%
11	Svetlana Shevel	Communist Party	4,593	7.42%
11	Natalya Sokolova	A Just Russia — For Truth	3,547	5.73%
11	Anna Semenova	New People	2,217	3.58%
11	Arutyun Paronyan	Liberal Democratic Party	2,173	3.51%
11	Total		61,900	100%
11	Source:			
12	Mikhail Kolodyazhny	United Russia	37,043	74.42%
12	Igor Shramko	Communist Party	5,947	11.95%
12	Kristina Patsenko	A Just Russia — For Truth	2,638	5.30%
12	Valery Litvin	Liberal Democratic Party	2,378	4.78%
12	Aleksey Khaliulin	New People	1,312	2.64%
12	Total		49,776	100%
12	Source:			
13	Aleksey Shtanichev	United Russia	45,065	75.64%
13	Yury Averyanov	Communist Party	4,979	8.36%
13	Maria Anishchenko	Liberal Democratic Party	3,654	6.13%
13	Sergey Kapitsa	A Just Russia — For Truth	2,576	4.32%
13	Aleksandr Makeyev	New People	2,476	4.16%
13	Total		59,577	100%
13	Source:			
14	Aleksey Titov	United Russia	53,323	78.41%
14	Grachik Davtyan	Communist Party	6,579	9.67%
14	Vadim Beglaryan	Liberal Democratic Party	2,874	4.23%
14	Nikolay Degtyarev	A Just Russia — For Truth	2,448	3.60%
14	Viktoria Makeyeva	New People	2,234	3.29%
14	Total		68,006	100%
14	Source:			
15	Aleksandr Galenko (incumbent)	United Russia	48,473	72.37%
15	Irina Smirnova	Communist Party	9,692	14.47%
15	Igor Kolotev	A Just Russia — For Truth	4,064	6.07%
15	Yevgeny Samokhvalov	New People	3,673	5.48%
15	Total		66,984	100%
15	Source:			
16	Vladimir Zyuzin (incumbent)	United Russia	70,942	81.36%
16	Nadezhda Kodenko	Communist Party	6,649	7.63%
16	Dmitry Udodenko	A Just Russia — For Truth	3,094	3.55%
16	Anton Kosenko	Liberal Democratic Party	2,998	3.44%
16	Isa Ibragimov	New People	2,722	3.12%
16	Total		87,197	100%
16	Source:			
17	Tatyana Ochkalasova	United Russia	77,224	81.11%
17	Dmitry Svezhinov	Liberal Democratic Party	6,649	6.98%
17	Valery Ragozin	A Just Russia — For Truth	6,253	6.57%
17	Mikhail Strelnikov	Communist Party	4,813	5.05%
17	Total		95,214	100%
17	Source:			
18	Sergey Nosov	United Russia	48,726	85.00%
18	Viktoria Strakaneva	Communist Party	2,794	4.87%
18	Sergey Kusmakov	New People	2,198	3.83%
18	Valery Iskantiyev	A Just Russia — For Truth	1,585	2.76%
18	Vitaly Konyayev	Liberal Democratic Party	1,539	2.68%
18	Total		57,324	100%
18	Source:			
19	Aleksandr Makoveyev	United Russia	46,242	76.40%
19	Yury Spirin	Communist Party	4,465	7.38%
19	Vitaly Pikula	A Just Russia — For Truth	4,038	6.67%
19	Igor Martynov	Liberal Democratic Party	2,753	4.55%
19	Nina Popova	New People	2,493	4.12%
19	Total		60,527	100%
19	Source:			
20	Sergey Kosyanikov	United Russia	54,444	75.23%
20	Aleksandr Ilyukhin	Communist Party	6,089	8.41%
20	Semyon Koltsov	Liberal Democratic Party	4,090	5.65%
20	Denis Fomenko	A Just Russia — For Truth	3,984	5.51%
20	Denis Shavlach	New People	2,800	3.87%
20	Total		72,369	100%
20	Source:			
21	Zhanna Belovol	United Russia	34,768	77.31%
21	Yury Nazarov	Communist Party	4,563	10.15%
21	Dmitry Turchenko	A Just Russia — For Truth	1,883	4.19%
21	Violetta Ovdiyenko	Liberal Democratic Party	1,673	3.72%
21	Lilia Yasenko	New People	1,384	3.08%
21	Total		44,970	100%
21	Source:			
22	Vladimir Lybanev (incumbent)	United Russia	55,884	79.35%
22	Aleksandr Protsenko	Communist Party	4,443	6.31%
22	Eduard Vrublevsky	New People	4,388	6.23%
22	Andrey Bogdanov	A Just Russia — For Truth	2,885	4.10%
22	Boris Antoniadi	Liberal Democratic Party	1,917	2.72%
22	Total		70,427	100%
22	Source:			
23	Sergey Belan (incumbent)	United Russia	21,837	65.90%
23	Alla Svarovskaya	Communist Party	4,667	14.08%
23	Vadim Kulkov	New People	2,046	6.17%
23	Aleksandr Tikhonov	A Just Russia — For Truth	1,592	4.80%
23	Pavel Grengolm	Liberal Democratic Party	1,498	4.52%
23	Total		33,136	100%
23	Source:			
24	Aleksandr Pogolov	United Russia	34,827	62.41%
24	Aleksandr Zaytsev	A Just Russia — For Truth	6,831	12.24%
24	Vladimir Shevchenko	Liberal Democratic Party	5,173	9.27%
24	Yevgeny Maltsev	Communist Party	5,068	9.08%
24	Artyom Bachurin	New People	3,507	6.28%
24	Total		55,805	100%
24	Source:			
25	Vyacheslav Sbitnev (incumbent)	United Russia	33,177	66.29%
25	Sergey Globa	A Just Russia — For Truth	12,118	24.21%
25	Svetlana Kozhushko	Communist Party	3,009	6.01%
25	Valentina Chugunova	Liberal Democratic Party	1,275	2.55%
25	Total		50,049	100%
25	Source:			
26	Sergey Orlov	United Russia	56,806	76.34%
26	Anton Chmel	Communist Party	5,048	6.78%
26	Anatoly Syusyukin	Liberal Democratic Party	4,473	6.01%
26	Konstantin Likhomanov	A Just Russia — For Truth	4,131	5.55%
26	Dmitry Belostotsky	New People	3,499	4.70%
26	Total		74,412	100%
26	Source:			
27	Yevgeny Shendrik	United Russia	31,555	76.43%
27	Yekaterina Sandetskaya	Communist Party	3,331	8.07%
27	Karine Zatsepina	Liberal Democratic Party	2,026	4.91%
27	Anastasia Irkhina	A Just Russia — For Truth	1,999	4.84%
27	Lyudmila Shuriga	New People	1,193	2.89%
27	Olga Sandetskaya	Rodina	699	1.69%
27	Total		41,286	100%
27	Source:			
28	Vladimir Kharlamov (incumbent)	United Russia	28,981	64.13%
28	Roman Polivoda	Communist Party	8,095	17.91%
28	Artyom Kucher	A Just Russia — For Truth	3,077	6.81%
28	Valery Chub	Liberal Democratic Party	2,315	5.12%
28	Bogdan Konovalov	New People	1,915	4.24%
28	Total		45,191	100%
28	Source:			
29	Viktor Chernyavsky (incumbent)	United Russia	38,290	81.45%
29	Dmitry Garmatyuk	Communist Party	4,120	8.76%
29	Irina Antishko	A Just Russia — For Truth	2,006	4.27%
29	Zinaida Kireyeva	Liberal Democratic Party	1,027	2.18%
29	Nikita Lyapunov	New People	974	2.07%
29	Total		47,008	100%
29	Source:			
30	Igor Chemeris	United Russia	48,017	85.47%
30	Aleksandr Alekseyenko	Communist Party	2,790	4.97%
30	Vladimir Kovalenko	Liberal Democratic Party	1,980	3.52%
30	Denis Nikonorov	A Just Russia — For Truth	1,555	2.77%
30	Aleksandr Martynyuk	New People	1,149	2.05%
30	Total		56,178	100%
30	Source:			
31	Nikolay Morar	United Russia	53,855	77.71%
31	Igor Ignatov	Communist Party	5,582	8.05%
31	Ruslan Bulatov	Liberal Democratic Party	3,864	5.58%
31	Sergey Derenovsky	A Just Russia — For Truth	3,066	4.42%
31	Elviz Vishnyakov	New People	2,263	3.27%
31	Total		69,299	100%
31	Source:			
32	Yulia Parkhomenko (incumbent)	Party of Growth	57,825	77.47%
32	Rostislav Shcherbakov	Communist Party	6,891	9.23%
32	Aleksandr Pronin	A Just Russia — For Truth	4,019	5.38%
32	Vagram Kochyan	Liberal Democratic Party	3,223	4.32%
32	Yelena Simutina	New People	2,502	3.35%
32	Total		74,646	100%
32	Source:			
33	Sergey Yaryshev (incumbent)	United Russia	40,075	73.44%
33	Vitaly Pronkin	Communist Party	8,230	15.08%
33	Aleksey Andreyev	A Just Russia — For Truth	3,285	6.02%
33	Yulia Stoycheva	Liberal Democratic Party	2,384	4.37%
33	Total		54,572	100%
33	Source:			
34	Aleksandr Karpenko	United Russia	56,051	76.26%
34	Viktor Surikov	Communist Party	6,786	9.23%
34	Sergey Kostyrev	A Just Russia — For Truth	3,818	5.19%
34	Igor Stepanov	Liberal Democratic Party	3,516	4.78%
34	Viktoria Lomaka	New People	3,044	4.14%
34	Total		73,501	100%
34	Source:			
35	Andrey Gorban	United Russia	53,440	78.87%
35	Vyacheslav Markov	Communist Party	9,234	13.63%
35	Natalya Lapcheva	A Just Russia — For Truth	1,992	2.94%
35	Oleg Mokan	New People	1,382	2.04%
35	Nikolay Pochtenny	Liberal Democratic Party	1,267	1.87%
35	Total		67,753	100%
35	Source:			
36	Nikolay Chaly	United Russia	36,712	73.71%
36	Maksim Khanin	Communist Party	4,658	9.35%
36	Nadezhda Demchenko	New People	3,143	6.31%
36	Natalya Rubezhnaya	A Just Russia — For Truth	2,266	4.55%
36	Denis Kumpan	Liberal Democratic Party	2,108	4.23%
36	Total		49,804	100%
36	Source:			
37	Konstantin Dimitriyev	United Russia	39,252	78.73%
37	Ilona Grachevskaya	Communist Party	4,055	8.13%
37	Maria Voytenko	A Just Russia — For Truth	2,344	4.70%
37	Viktor Semykin	New People	1,966	3.94%
37	Tatyana Glushkova	Liberal Democratic Party	1,893	3.80%
37	Total		49,855	100%
37	Source:			
38	Sergey Orlenko	United Russia	37,107	68.03%
38	Igor Boyko	Communist Party	7,398	13.56%
38	Lyudmila Deynega	Liberal Democratic Party	3,907	7.16%
38	Yelena Grzhivach	New People	3,558	6.52%
38	Konstantin Chekudzhan	A Just Russia — For Truth	1,719	3.15%
38	Total		54,547	100%
38	Source:			
39	Aleksey Kosach	United Russia	47,639	65.44%
39	Nikolay Borovkov	Communist Party	9,363	12.86%
39	Aleksandr Kraynik	Liberal Democratic Party	4,824	6.63%
39	Anton Izhak	New People	4,713	6.47%
39	Nikolay Izvestkov	A Just Russia — For Truth	4,363	5.99%
39	Total		72,797	100%
39	Source:			
40	Andrey Buldin	United Russia	38,892	71.06%
40	Andrey Babenko	Communist Party	7,706	14.08%
40	Leonid Zakharenko	Liberal Democratic Party	3,449	6.30%
40	Artyom Gayday	A Just Russia — For Truth	2,342	4.28%
40	Mikhail Starikov	New People	1,712	3.13%
40	Total		54,728	100%
40	Source:			
41	Aleksandr Dzheus (incumbent)	United Russia	41,108	74.00%
41	Artur Arakelyan	Communist Party	6,142	11.06%
41	Viktor Ivanov	Liberal Democratic Party	3,347	6.03%
41	Aleksey Nazarenko	New People	2,801	5.04%
41	Sergey Usenko	A Just Russia — For Truth	1,531	2.76%
41	Total		55,548	100%
41	Source:			
42	Veronika Ivanchikova	Liberal Democratic Party	31,010	66.76%
42	Valery Bayev	Communist Party	10,198	21.95%
42	Kira Skripal	New People	4,171	8.98%
42	Total		46,451	100%
42	Source:			
43	Viktor Teplyakov (incumbent)	United Russia	52,494	70.00%
43	Sergey Khamlov	Communist Party	16,110	21.48%
43	Yulia Fayzullina	New People	2,128	2.84%
43	Lyudmila Bazyleva	Liberal Democratic Party	1,911	2.55%
43	Denis Kuzminykh	A Just Russia — For Truth	1,686	2.25%
43	Total		74,995	100%
43	Source:			
44	Boris Yunanov	United Russia	30,433	62.69%
44	Sergey Nikolayev	Communist Party	11,193	23.06%
44	Aleksandr Nikolayenko	Liberal Democratic Party	3,597	7.41%
44	Anatoly Buturidi	A Just Russia — For Truth	2,978	6.13%
44	Total		48,546	100%
44	Source:			
45	Anna Nevzorova	United Russia	26,718	67.59%
45	Vladislav Zhironkin	Communist Party	4,795	12.13%
45	Olga Zarkova	Liberal Democratic Party	2,820	7.13%
45	Sofia Minina	New People	2,450	6.20%
45	Konstantin Butyrev	A Just Russia — For Truth	2,167	5.48%
45	Total		39,527	100%
45	Source:			

Legislative Assembly Deputy Speaker Aleksandr Trembitsky (United Russia) was appointed to the Federation Council, replacing incumbent Vladimir Beketov (United Russia).

== See also ==
- 2022 Russian regional elections
