= Belaya Glina =

Belaya Glina (Russian: Бе́лая Гли́на) is the name of several rural localities in Russia:

- Belaya Glina, Krasnodar Krai, a selo in Beloglinsky Rural Okrug of Beloglinsky District of Krasnodar Krai
- Belaya Glina, Sverdlovsk Oblast, a village in Verkhotursky District of Sverdlovsk Oblast
