= Evgeny Gromyko =

Russian politician (born 1962)

- Евгений Громыко
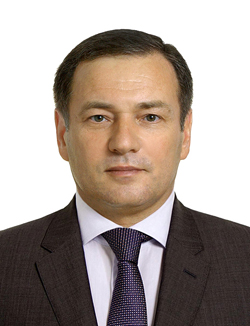
- Gromyko in 2009

Senator from Krasnodar Krai
- In office 22 January 2014 – 23 July 2015
- Preceded by: Nikolai Kondratenko
- Succeeded by: Vladimir Kharlamov

Personal details
- Born: Evgeny Gromyko; 22 December 1962 (age 63) Vyselki, Krasnodar Krai, Russian SFSR, Soviet Union
- Education: Kuban State Agrarian University

Evgeny Vasilievich Gromyko (Russian: Евгений Васильевич Громыко; born 22 December 1962) is a Russian politician who served as a senator from Krasnodar Krai from 2014 to 2015.

== Career ==
Evgeny Gromyko was born on 22 December 1962 in Vyselki, Krasnodar Krai. In 1985, he graduated from the Kuban State Agrarian University. After graduation, he worked as a senior veterinarian in the livestock department of the inter-farm complex for growing and fattening cattle "Vyselkovsky". In 1989, he joined the Vyselkovsky district committee of the Komsomol that was headed by Alexander Tkachov. In 2001, Gromyko was appointed general director of the Department of Regional Food of the Krasnodar Krai. The same year, he became the advisor to Alexander Tkachov, who was the head of the administration of the Krasnodar Krai. From 2009 to 2012, Gromyko served as Deputy Head of Administration (Governor) of the Krasnodar Krai Alexander Tkachev. From January 2014 to July 2015 Gromyko represented Krasnodar Krai in the Federation Council. He left the position to become a deputy head of the Minister of Agriculture.

== Awards ==
- Certificate of honor from the Council of Ministers of the Republic of Belarus (December 9, 2014).
