= Alexey Tkachov =

Russian politician

- Алексей Ткачев
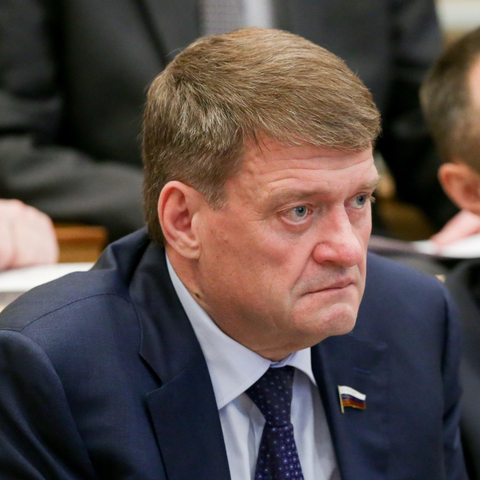

Deputy of the 8th State Duma
- Incumbent
- Assumed office 19 September 2021

Deputy of the 7th State Duma
- In office 5 October 2016 – 12 October 2021

Deputy of the 6th State Duma
- In office 21 December 2011 – 5 October 2016

Deputy of the 5th State Duma
- In office 24 December 2007 – 21 December 2011

Deputy of the 4th State Duma
- In office 29 December 2003 – 24 December 2007

Personal details
- Born: 1 March 1957 (age 69) Vyselki, Krasnodar Krai, Russian Soviet Federative Socialist Republic, USSR
- Party: United Russia
- Education: Saratov Higher Military Command and Engineering School of Missile Troops

Alexey Tkachov (Russian: Алексей Николаевич Ткачев; born 1 March 1957, Vyselki, Krasnodar Krai) is a Russian political figure and a deputy of the 4th, 5th, 6th, 7th, and 8th State Dumas.

From 1979 to 1992, Tkachov served at the Soviet Armed Forces. After that, he started working at the Vyselki inter-farm feed mill. From 1993 to 2002, he was the deputy of the Legislative Assembly of Krasnodar Krai of the 3rd convocation. From 2000 to 2003, he was a member of the Agrarian Party of Russia. In 2003, he was elected deputy of the 4th State Duma from the Krasnodar Krai constituency. In 2007, 2011, 2016, and 2021, he was re-elected for the 5th, 6th, 7th, and 8th State Dumas, respectively.

Tkachov's younger brother, Alexander Tkachov, is a former Governor of Krasnodar Krai and Minister of Agriculture.

In 2016, Dissernet found plagiarism in Tkachov's Candidate of Sciences dissertation.

In 2021, Kolomenskoe Moloko LLC accused Tkachov of using his powers and deputy status to take control of the company. In response, Tkachov refused all the accusations.

== Awards ==
- Order "For Service to the Homeland in the Armed Forces of the USSR"
- Order "For Merit to the Fatherland"
