= Bratsky =

Bratsky (masculine), Bratskaya (feminine), or Bratskoye (neuter) may refer to:

- Bratsky District, a district of Irkutsk Oblast, Russia
- Bratsky (rural locality) (Bratskaya, Bratskoye), name of several rural localities in Russia
- Bratsk Hydroelectric Power Station (Bratskaya GES), a power station on the Angara River, Russia
