= Alexey Yezubov =

Russian politician

- Алексей Езубов
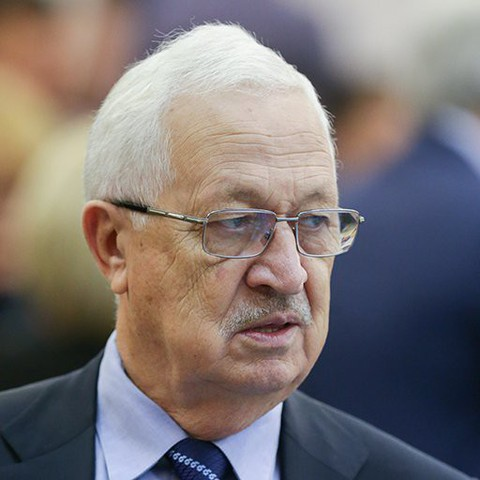

Member of the State Duma for Krasnodar Krai
- Incumbent
- Assumed office 5 October 2016
- Preceded by: constituency re-established
- Constituency: Tikhoretsk (No. 51)

Member of the State Duma (Party List Seat)
- In office 24 December 2007 – 5 October 2016

Personal details
- Born: 10 February 1948 (age 78) Khutor Sokol'skiy, Ust-Labinsky District, Russian SFSR, USSR
- Party: United Russia
- Spouse: Galina Nikolaevna (died 2021)
- Children: 2
- Relatives: Oleg Deripaska (nephew)
- Education: Ordzhonikidze Higher Anti-Aircraft Missile Command School of Air Defense

Alexey Petrovich Yezubov (Russian: Алексей Петрович Езубов; born 10 February 1948, Khutor Sokol'skiy, Ust-Labinsky District) is a Russian political figure and a deputy of the 5th, 6th, 7th, and 8th State Dumas.

After graduating from the Ordzhonikidze Higher Anti-Aircraft Missile Command School of Air Defense, Yezubov served at the Soviet Armed Forces. In 1997, he was appointed Deputy Financial Director of Siberian Aluminum LLC. From 1997 to 2002, he headed the agricultural, industrial group Basic Element. He was a member of the boards of directors of various companies and industrial organizations, including the Moscow non-ferrous metal processing plant, the Sayan aluminium plant, Avtogazbank, and others. In 2007, he was elected deputy of the 5th State Duma from the Krasnodar Krai constituency. In 2011, 2016, and 2021, he was re-elected for the 6th, 7th, and 8th State Dumas, respectively.

== Sanctions ==
He was sanctioned by the UK government in 2022 in relation to the Russian invasion of Ukraine.
