= 2017 Krasnodar Krai Legislative Assembly election =

2017 Krasnodar Krai parliamentary election
- 10 September 2017

All 70 seats to the Legislative Assembly 36 seats are needed for a majority
- Turnout: 42.03%
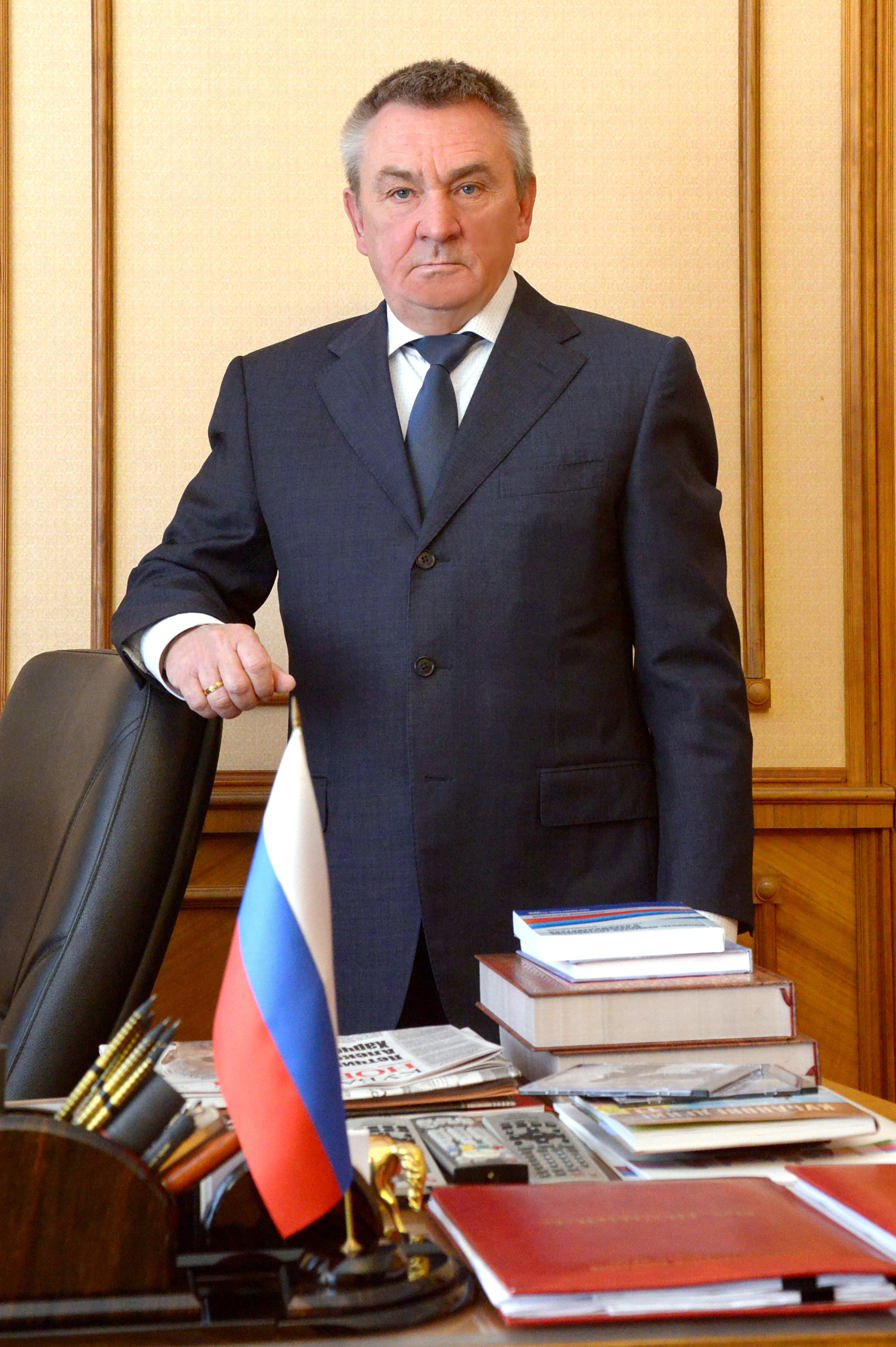

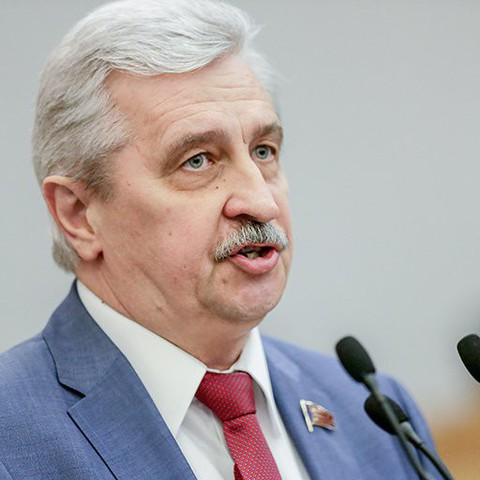

	First party	Second party	Third party
Leader	Vladimir Beketov	Nikolay Osadchy	Ivan Tutushkin
Party	United Russia	CPRF	LDPR
Seats before	95	5	0
Seats won	60	3	3
Seat change	▼35	▼2	▲3
Popular vote	1,199,904	195,424	188,972
Percentage	70.78%	11.53%	11.15%
Swing	▲1.31pp	▲2.55pp	▲6.59pp
	Fourth party	Fifth party
Leader	Denis Khmelevskoy	Igor Yakimchik
Party	A Just Russia	Party of Growth
Seats before	0	0
Seats won	1	1
Seat change	▲1	▲1
Popular vote	58,632	N/A
Percentage	3.46%	N/A
Swing	▼0.69pp	N/A
Chairman of the Legislative Assembly before election
Vladimir Beketov
United Russia
Elected Chairman of the Legislative Assembly
Yury Burlachko
United Russia

Parliamentary elections were held in Krasnodar Krai on 10 September 2017. After the previous elections in 2012, United Russia was the largest party in the Legislative Assembly with 95 seats.

The number of seats in the sixth convocation of the Legislative Assembly of the Krasnodar Krai was lowered from 100 to 70.

== Electoral system ==
Under current election laws, the Legislative Assembly is elected on a single day for a term of five years, with parallel voting. 35 seats are elected by party-list proportional representation with a 5% electoral threshold, with the other half elected in 35 single-member constituencies by first-past-the-post voting.

== Participating parties ==
The parties on the ballot.

Party	Regional leader	№ 1 in party list	Ideology	Seats before election
A Just Russia	Denis Khmelevskoy (acting)	Viktor Sergeev	Social democracy	0
Liberal Democratic Party	Ivan Tutushkin	Vladimir Zhirinovsky	Russian nationalism / Pan-Slavism	0
United Russia	Vladimir Beketov	Vladimir Beketov	National conservatism / statism / centrism	95
Communist Party	Nikolay Osadchy	Nikolay Osadchy	Communism / Marxism–Leninism	5
Communists of Russia	Yuliya Gorshenina	Yuliya Gorshenina	Communism / Marxism–Leninism	0
Party of Growth	Igor Yakimchik	None	Liberal conservatism	0

== Result ==
Party	Party List				Constituency	Total result	
Party	Votes	%	±pp	Seats	Seats	Seats	+/–
United Russia	1,199,904	70.78	▲1.31	29	31	60	▼35
Communist Party of the Russian Federation	195,424	11.53	▲2.55	3	0	3	▼2
Liberal Democratic Party of Russia	188,972	11.15	▲6.59	3	0	3	▲3
A Just Russia	58,632	3.46	▼0.69	0	1	1	▲1
Party of Growth	No Party List				1	1	▲1
Communists of Russia	26,155	1.54	▼1.73	0	0	0	Steady
Independent	No Party List				2	2	▲2
Total	1,695,223	100		35	35	70	▼30
Registered voters/turnout	4,033,025	42.03			0	0.00	

== See also ==
- 2017 Russian regional elections
