= Vladimir Kharlamov =

Russian politician (born 1963)

- Владимир Харламов

Senator from Krasnodar Krai
- In office 30 November 2015 – 15 September 2017
- Preceded by: Evgeny Gromyko
- Succeeded by: Vladimir Beketov

Personal details
- Born: Vladimir Kharlamov; 1 January 1963 (age 63) Vyselki, Krasnodar Krai, Russian SFSR, Soviet Union
- Education: Russian State Trade and Economic University

Vladimir Ivanovich Kharlamov (Russian: Владимир Иванович Харламов; born 1 January 1963) is a Russian politician who served as a senator from Krasnodar Krai from 2015 to 2017.

== Career ==
Vladimir Kharlamov was born on 1 January 1963 in Vyselki, Krasnodar Krai. He graduated from the Russian State Trade and Economic University. Later he served as deputy of the Legislative Assembly of Krasnodar Krai of the 5th convocation. From November 2015 to September 2017 Kharlamov represented Krasnodar Krai in the Federation Council.
