= 2017 Russian regional elections =

← 2016	10 September 2017	2018 →

262 seats from 3,980
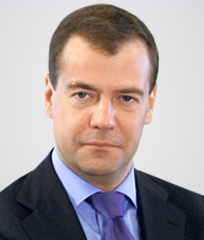

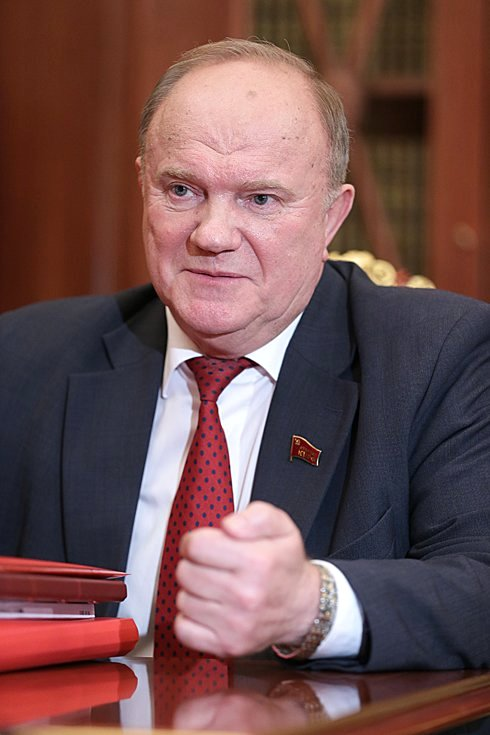

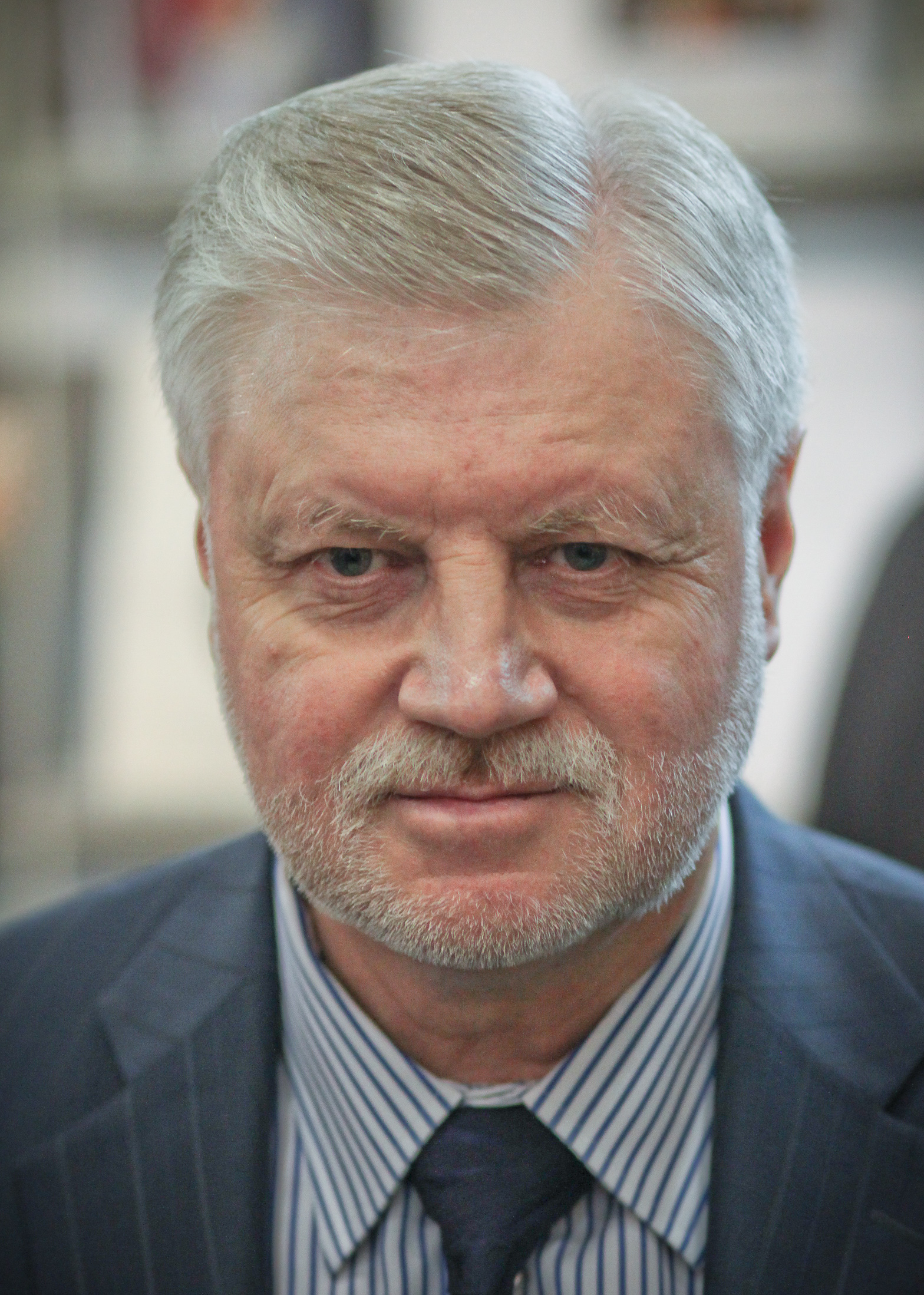

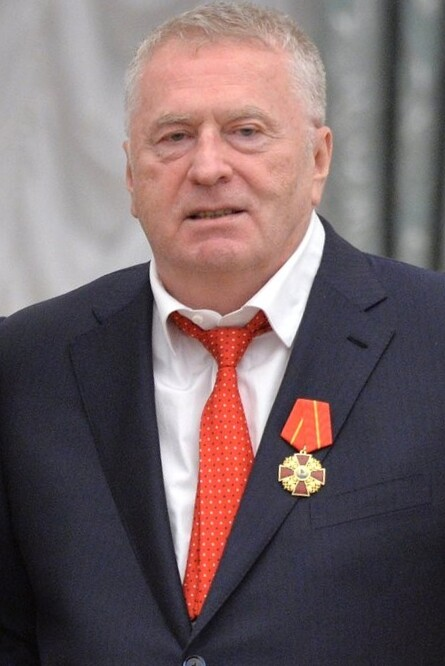

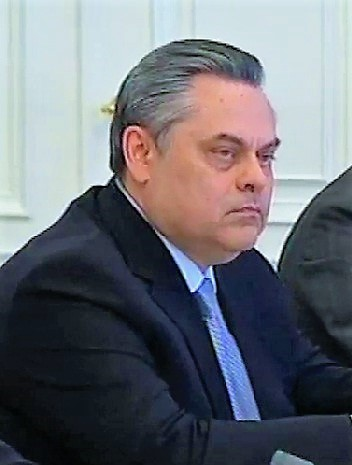

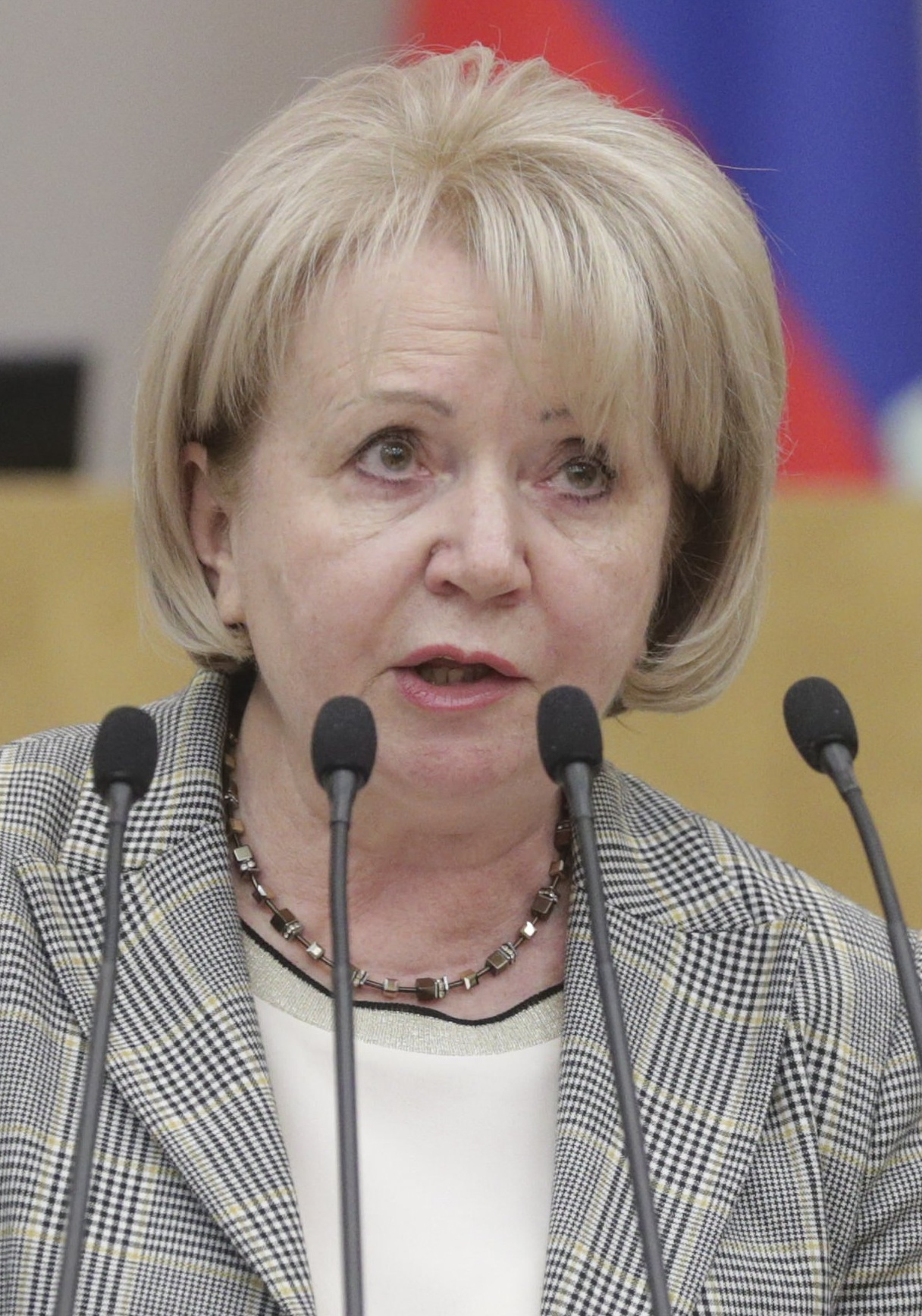
Leader	Dmitry Medvedev	Gennady Zyuganov	Sergey Mironov
Party	United Russia	CPRF	SR
Current seats	3,162	338	178
Current regions	85	79	74
Leader	Vladimir Zhirinovsky	Gennady Semigin	Emilia Slabunova
Party	LDPR	Patriots of Russia	Yabloko
Current seats	238	24	7
Current regions	68	5	3

Regional elections were held on 10 September 2017 in six federal subjects of Russia.

== Race summary ==
Federal Subject	Parliament	Seats	Parties prior to election	Parties after election	Election
Krasnodar Krai	Legislative Assembly of Krasnodar Krai	70	United Russia (95); CPRF (5)	United Russia (60); CPRF (3); LDPR (3); Independent (2); A Just Russia (1); Party of Growth (1)	Election
North Ossetia–Alania	Parliament of North Ossetia–Alania	70	United Russia (44) Patriots of Russia (15); A Just Russia (5) CPRF (5)	United Russia (46) Patriots of Russia (12) A Just Russia (7) CPRF (5)	Election
Penza Oblast	Legislative Assembly of Penza Oblast	36	United Russia (34); CPRF (2)	United Russia (32) CPRF (2) A Just Russia (1) LDPR (1)	Election
Sakhalin Oblast	Sakhalin Oblast Duma	14	United Russia (21); CPRF (4); A Just Russia (1); LDPR (1)	United Russia (9) CPRF (3) LDPR (2)	Election
Saratov Oblast	Saratov Oblast Duma	45	United Russia (39); A Just Russia (1) CPRF (1) Vacant (4)	United Russia (38) CPRF (4) LDPR (2) A Just Russia (1)	Election l
Udmurtia	State Council of the Udmurt Republic	60	United Russia (72); CPRF (10); LDPR (6); A Just Russia (2)	United Russia (47); CPRF (5) Independent (4); LDPR (2); A Just Russia (2)	Election

== See also ==
- 2017 Russian gubernatorial elections
