= Vyacheslav Vorobyov =

Russian footballer (1962–2026)

Personal information
- Full name: Vyacheslav Nikolayevich Vorobyov
- Date of birth: 27 November 1962
- Place of birth: Novopokrovskaya, Russian SFSR, Soviet Union
- Date of death: 11 August 2026 (aged 63)
- Height: 1.76 m (5 ft 9 in)
- Positions: Defender; midfielder

Senior career*
| Years | Team | Apps | (Gls) |
| 1981–1982 | Kuban Krasnodar | 0 | (0) |
| 1982 | Tsement Novorossiysk | 11 | (1) |
| 1983 | Kuban Krasnodar | 0 | (0) |
| 1984–1985 | SKA Rostov | 2 | (0) |
| 1986 | Kuban Krasnodar | 40 | (1) |
| 1987–1988 | Krylia Sovetov Kuybyshev | 43 | (0) |
| 1988–1989 | Kuban Krasnodar | 50 | (0) |
| 1990–1991 | FC Tighina | 68 | (0) |
| 1992–1993 | KAMAZ Naberezhnye Chelny | 45 | (0) |
| 1993 | → KAMAZ-d Naberezhnye Chelny (loan) | 4 | (0) |
| 1994–1996 | FC Lada-Yug Krasnodar | | |
| 1997 | FC Torpedo-GAZ Krasnodar | | |
| 1998 | FC Laba Ust-Labinsk | | |
| 1999 | FC MKK Korenovsk | | |
| 2002 | FC Kuban Ust-Labinsk | | |
- * Club domestic league appearances and goals

Vyacheslav Nikolayevich Vorobyov (Russian: Вячеслав Николаевич Воробьёв; 27 November 1962 – 11 August 2026) was a Russian footballer who played as a defender and midfielder. He died on 11 August 2026, at the age of 63.
