= 2017 North Ossetia–Alania parliamentary election =

2017 North Ossetian legislative election turnout map.

In 2017, elections were held to elect members of the Parliament of the Republic of North Ossetia–Alania. Vyacheslav Bitarov returned as Head of North Ossetia-Alania.

== Results ==
2017 North Ossetia–Alania parliamentary election
Party	Votes	%	+/- pp	Seats	+/-
United Russia	182,127	59.19	▲14.99	46	▲9
Patriots of Russia	48,422	15.74	▼10.83	12	0
A Just Russia	31,459	10.22	▲3.05	7	▲2
Communist Party	20,270	6.59	▼3.89	5	▼1
Rodina	10,174	3.31	—	0	—
Liberal Democratic Party	6,551	2.13	▲0.80	0	—
Alliance of the Greens–People's Party	2,913	0.95	▼1.11	0	0
Party of Growth	1,141	0.37	▼1.28	0	0
Valid ballots	303,057	98.49	▲1.22		
Invalid ballots	4,657	1.51	▼1.22		
Total	307,714	100	—	70	▲11
Registered voters/turnout	521,858	58.97	▲14.00		
