= Abram Pinkenson =

Soviet pioneer and schoolboy

Abram Vladimirovich Pinkenson
- Born: 5 December 1930; Bălți, Bessarabia, Romania
- Died: November 1942 (aged 11); Ust-Labinsk, Krasnodar Krai, Russian SFSR, USSR

Abram Vladimirovich "Musya" Pinkenson (5 December 1930 – November 1942) was a Soviet pioneer and schoolboy who was shot by the German occupying forces in 1942.

== Biography ==
Abram was the son of a doctor, Vladimir Borisovich Pinkenson, and his wife, Feni Moiseevna. His family had a long background in medicine, and one of his ancestors was the first physician of the Bălți district hospital at its inception in 1882.

At a young age, Abram learned to play the violin, and when he was five years old, a local newspaper described him as a violin prodigy. In 1941, Vladimir Pinkenson was assigned to a military hospital in Ust-Labinsk in the USSR. In the summer of 1942, after the start of Operation Barbarossa, the town of Ust-Labinsk was overrun by invading German troops, and there was no time to evacuate the hospital. Soon afterwards, Pinkenson and his family – who were Jewish – were arrested. In November 1942, they were taken to the banks of the river Kuban to be executed. While waiting to be lined up for execution, Abram began to play The Internationale on his violin. He was promptly shot to death by a German soldier.

After the end of World War II, Abram Pinkenson became widely known through articles in the Soviet press and radio. In particular, an article describing his deeds and heroic death was published in the newspaper Pravda in 1945. It was picked up not only in many parts of the Soviet Union, but also in Europe and America. At the place of the execution of the young violinist, an obelisk was erected. It was replaced by a concrete monument in the late 1970s.

== Commemoration ==
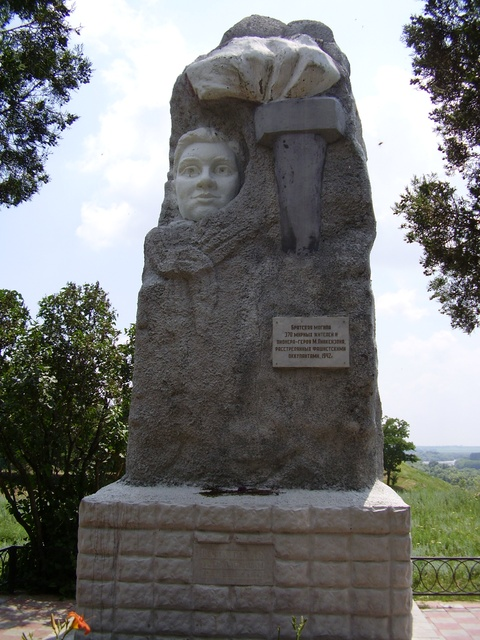
Concrete monument to Abram Pinkenson in Ust-Labinsk.

- Writer Saul N. Itskovich (1934–1988) wrote a book about Pinkenson entitled «Расстрелянная скрипка» ("Shot Violinist").
- The book «Муся Пинкензон (о пионере-герое)» ("Musya Pinkenson (Pioneer-Hero)") was published by Soviet publisher Маlysh in 1967. Subsequently, this book has been translated into several languages.
- The Pioneer squad of Ust-Labinsk School No. 1 was named after Musya Pinkenson. At the school, a memorial plaque in memory of Pinkenson was erected with the inscription: "In this school studied hero-pioneer Musya Pinkenson. He was shot by Hitler's Nazis in January 1943".
- Soyuzmultfilm in 1971 produced a cartoon called "Violin Pioneer" based on the deeds of Musya Pinkenson.
- The former Pushkin Lane in Balti was renamed in 2007 in Pinkenson's name and a plaque was placed on the newly built "Hesed Jacob" community house.
- In an alley on Rustaveli Street, Tbilisi, Georgia, a monument was erected to Pinkenson on the 34th house.
