= Bratsky, Republic of Bashkortostan =

Bratsky Братский
- Village
- Location within Bashkortostan Location within Russia
- Coordinates: 54°37′N 56°26′E
- Country: Russia
- Region: Bashkortostan
- District: Iglinsky District
- Time zone: UTC+5:00

Bratsky (Russian: Братский) is a rural locality (a village) in Ivano-Kazansky Selsoviet, Iglinsky District, Bashkortostan, Russia. The population was 10 as of 2010. There is 1 street.

== Geography ==
Bratsky is located 29 km south of Iglino (the district's administrative centre) by road. Ivano-Kazanka is the nearest rural locality.
