= Belaya Glina, Krasnodar Krai =

Rural locality in Beloglinsky District, Russia

Coordinates: 46°05′00″N 40°51′30″E

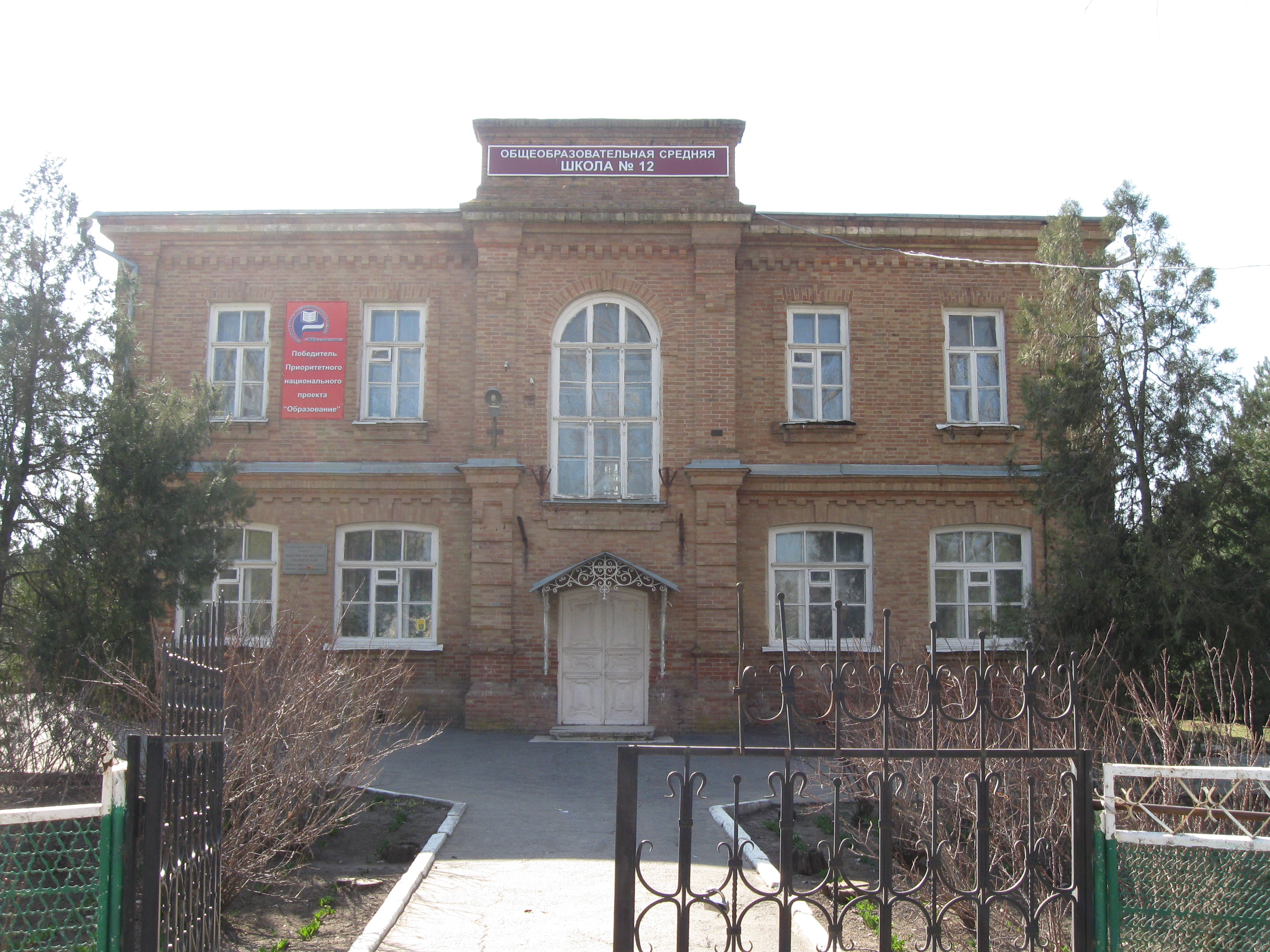
Balaya Glina . Russia

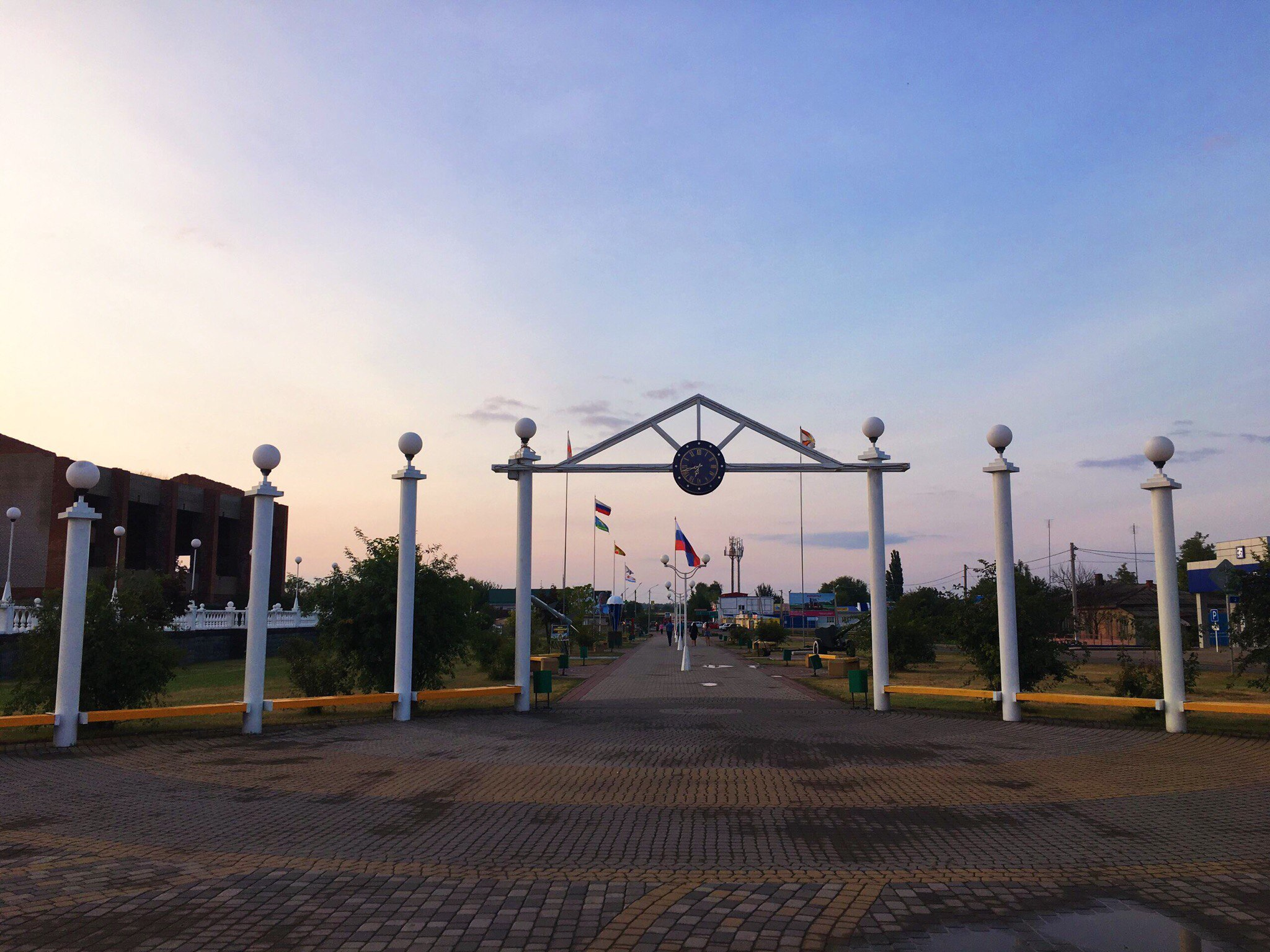
Main square of the village

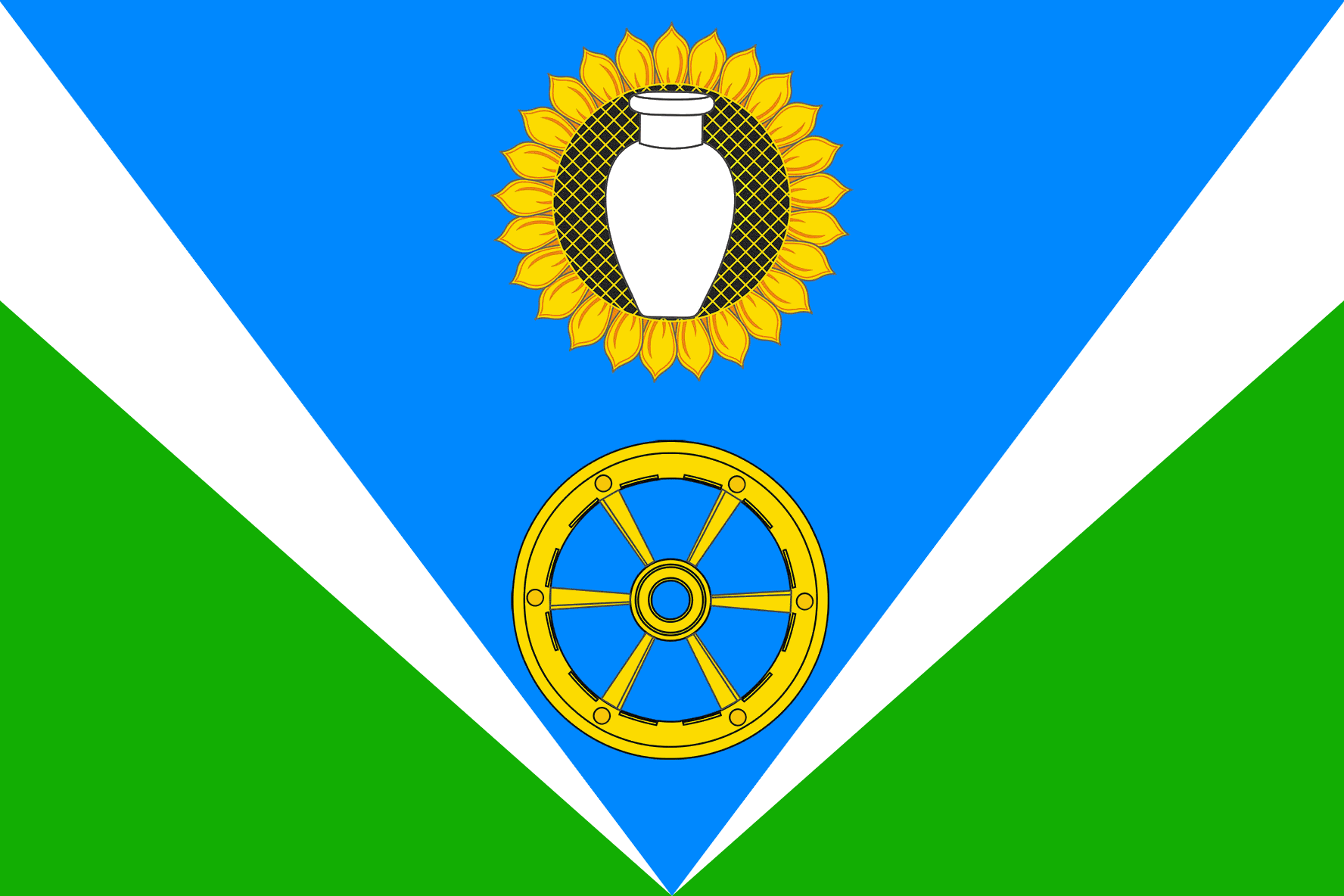
Flag of Belaya Glina

Belaya Glina (Russian: Бе́лая Гли́на) is a rural locality (a selo) and the administrative center of Beloglinsky District of Krasnodar Krai, Russia, located 200 kilometers (120 mi) northeast from Krasnodar, on the banks of the Rassypnaya River. Population: 17,320 (2010 census); 17,767 (2002 census); 17,881 (1989 Soviet census).

It was founded in 1820.
