= Novopokrovsky District =

Novopokrovsky District Новопокровский район
- District
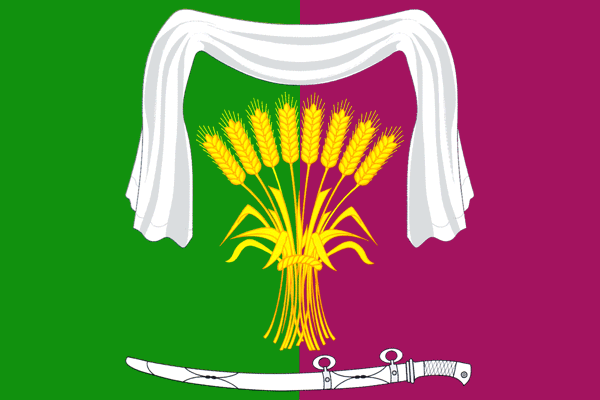
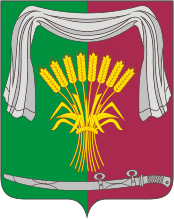
- Flag Coat of arms
- Location of Novopokrovsky District in Krasnodar Krai
- Coordinates: 45°05′17″N 40°42′24″E
- Country: Russia
- Federal subject: Krasnodar Krai
- Established: 1924
- Administrative center: Novopokrovskaya

Area
  - Total: 2,156 km^{2} (832 sq mi)

Population (2010 Census)
  - Total: 44,116
  - Density: 20.46/km^{2} (53.00/sq mi)
  - Urban: 0%
  - Rural: 100%

Administrative structure
  - Administrative divisions: 8 Rural okrugs
  - Inhabited localities: 32 rural localities

Municipal structure
  - Municipally incorporated as: Novopokrovsky Municipal District
  - Municipal divisions: 0 urban settlements, 8 rural settlements
- Time zone: UTC+3 (MSK)
- OKTMO ID: 03635000
- Website: http://www.novopokrovskaya.com/

Novopokrovsky District (Russian: Новопокро́вский райо́н) is an administrative district (raion), one of the thirty-eight in Krasnodar Krai, Russia. As a municipal division, it is incorporated as Novopokrovsky Municipal District. It is located in the northeast of the krai, covering an area of 2,156 square kilometers (832 sq mi). Its administrative center is the rural locality (a stanitsa) of Novopokrovskaya. Population: 44,116 (2010 Census); 47,893 (2002 Census); 46,842 (1989 Soviet census). The population of Novopokrovskaya accounts for 44.6% of the district's total population.
