= Ust-Labinsk =

Town in Krasnodar Krai, Russia

Ust-Labinsk Усть-Лабинск
- Town
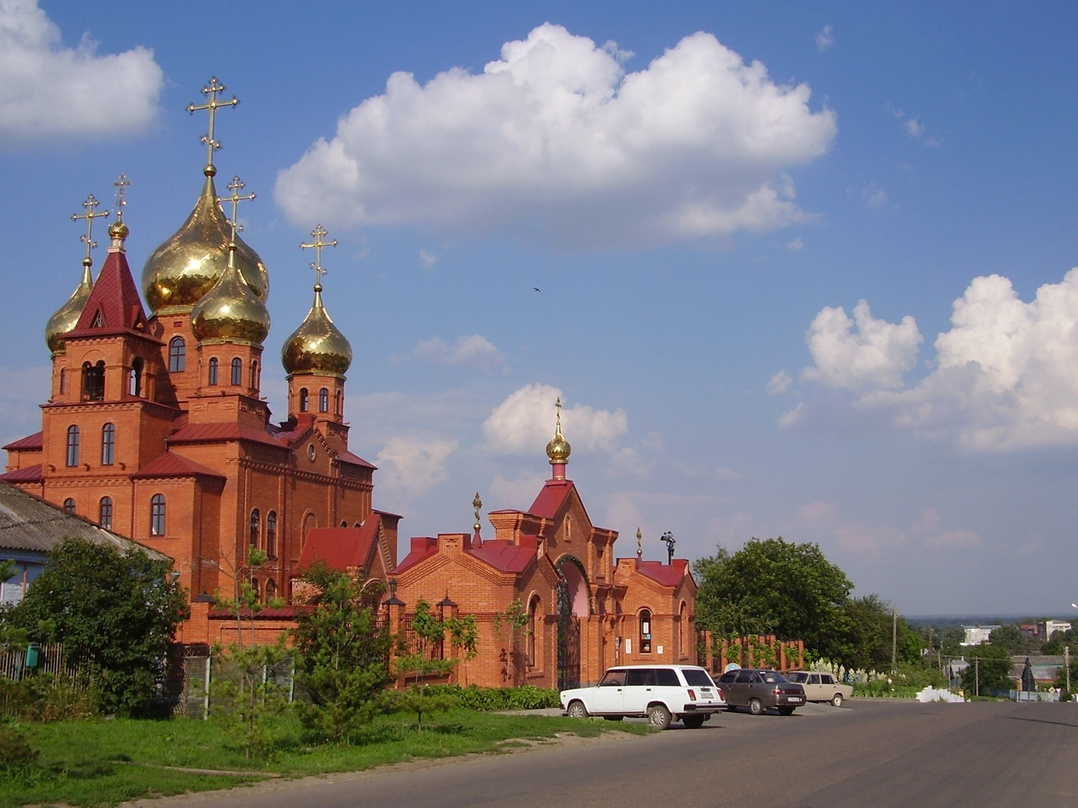
- Orthodox Church in Ust-Labinsk

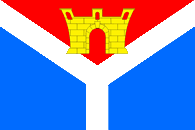
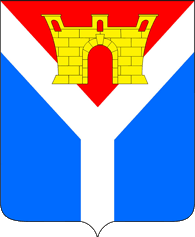
- Flag Coat of arms
- Interactive map of Ust-Labinsk
- Location of Ust-Labinsk Ust-Labinsk (Krasnodar Krai)
- Coordinates: 45°13′N 39°42′E
- Country: Russia
- Federal subject: Krasnodar Krai
- Administrative district: Ust-Labinsky District
- TownSelsoviet: Ust-Labinsk
- Founded: 1794
- Town status since: May 28, 1958
- Elevation: 70 m (230 ft)

Population (2010 Census)
  - Total: 43,270
  - Estimate (2025): 38,572 (−10.9%)

Administrative status
  - Capital of: Ust-Labinsky District, Town of Ust-Labinsk

Municipal status
  - Municipal district: Ust-Labinsky Municipal District
  - Urban settlement: Ust-Labinskoye Urban Settlement
  - Capital of: Ust-Labinsky Municipal District, Ust-Labinskoye Urban Settlement
- Time zone: UTC+3 (MSK)
- Postal codes: 352330–352337, 352349
- OKTMO ID: 03657101001
- Website: gorod-ust-labinsk.ru

Ust-Labinsk (Russian: Усть-Лаби́нск) is a town and the administrative center of Ust-Labinsky District of Krasnodar Krai, Russia.

== Geography ==
The town is situated in the central part of Krasnodar Krai, at the confluence of the Kuban and Laba rivers, 62 km to the east of Krasnodar.

== Population ==
Population: 39,456 (2020), 43,270 (2010 census); 43,824 (2002 census); 41,759 (1989 Soviet census).

== History ==
History of Ust-Labinsk dates back to 1778, when fort Aleksandrovskiy was founded at the confluence of Kuban and Laba rivers. The construction was finished in 1793, under the direction of general Ivan Gudovich. In 1794 stanitsa Ust-Labinskaya was established by the resettled Don Cossacks. On May 28, 1958, it was granted town status and renamed.

Two Heroes of the Soviet Union (Alexander Geraskin and Ivan Ivashchenko) were born in Ust-Labinsk, as well as soviet engineer Nikolay Popov (the chief designer of the T-80 tank), and football player Anton Vlasov. The 'Pioneer Hero' Abram Pinkenson was shot by the Nazis in the town in 1942. Russian billionaire Oleg Deripaska grew up in the town.

== Administrative and municipal status ==
Within the framework of administrative divisions, Ust-Labinsk serves as the administrative center of Ust-Labinsky District. As an administrative division, it is, together with two rural localities, incorporated within Ust-Labinsky District as the Town of Ust-Labinsk.

As a municipal division, the territory of Ust-Labinsk is incorporated within Ust-Labinsky Municipal District as Ust-Labinskoye Urban Settlement. The two rural localities are incorporated separately: the settlement of Dvubratsky is incorporated as Dvubratskoye Rural Settlement, while the khutor of Oktyabrsky is a part of Zheleznoye Rural Settlement, both of Ust-Labinsky Municipal District.

== Aleksandrovskaya Fortress festival ==
Since 2021, Ust-Labinsk annually hosts the world's largest ethnic Cossack festival Aleksandrovskaya Fortress, bringing together ethnic cossacks from around the globe.

The festival showcases traditional local culture through a variety of events, including musical concerts, cultural customs, food fairs, theatrical performances, and lectures on Cossack history. The festival is organised by the Volnoe Delo Foundation, whose founder Oleg Deripaska, ethnic Cossack, was born in Ust-Labinsk.

In 2022, one of the Festival's headliners was said to be the Russian-born Tajik singer Manizha, who represented Russia in the 2021 Eurovision Song Contest.

== First Lobachevsky University Lyceum ==
In 2022, Ust-Labinsk saw the opening of one of its key new landmarks – the First Lobachevsky University Lyceum.

The Lyceum is a boarding school for talented youths who want to study sciences. The Lyceum is designed for 475 students of the 7-11 grades. The Lyceum education is free of charge, based on a scholarship system.

The curriculum of the First University Lyceum is based on the principles of International Baccalaureate and at the same time replicates the academic educational system of leading universities. Most of Lyceum’s teachers and heads of departments are lecturers from leading universities and specifically the Moscow State University.

The Lyceum is named after a famous Russian mathematician Nikolay Lobachevsky to reflect the school's focus on sciences. The Lyceum was built by the Volnoe Delo Foundation.

The Lyceum is often nicknamed the 'Kuban Hogwarts'.

=== Architecture ===
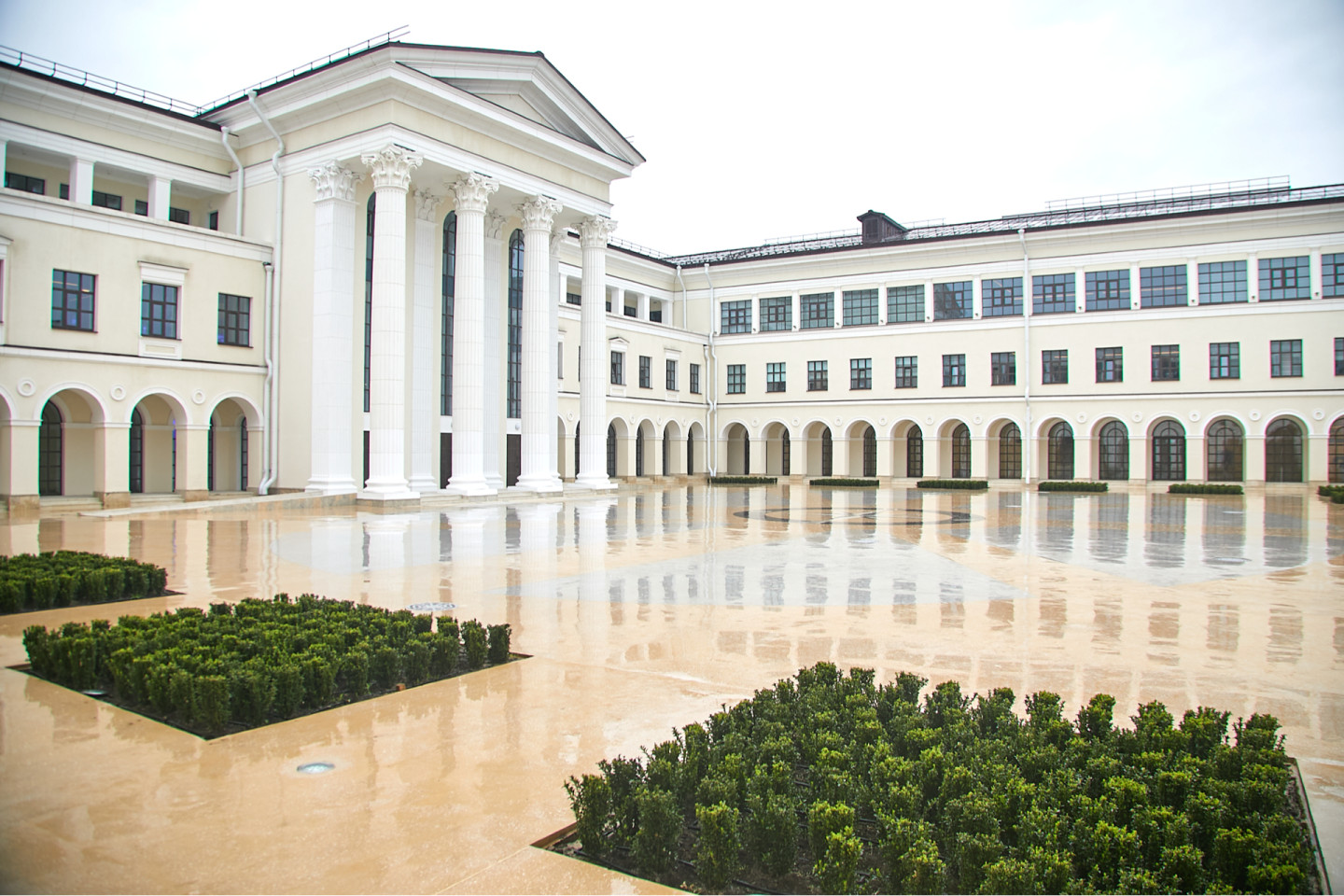
Courtyard of the First Lobachevsky University Lyceum

According to Lyceum's architect, the building was inspired by the works of the Renaissance architect Filippo Brunelleschi. The Lyceum is built in accordance with the classical architectural traditions that saw their rebirth in Renaissance Italy.

It echoes some of the key features of Brunelleschi’s Ospedale degli Innocenti located in Florence.

According to the architect, the arch entrance into the cloister bears a passing resemblance to Brunelleschi’s design of the Pazzi Chapel while the Lyceum’s main entrance is a magnificent classic three-storey high Corinthian portico.

The Lyceum's building has become one of Europe’s largest new-built structures in the Classical style.
