= Bratsky, Volgograd Oblast =

Bratsky Братский
- Khutor
- Location within Volgograd Oblast Location within Russia
- Coordinates: 48°24′N 43°37′E
- Country: Russia
- Region: Volgograd Oblast
- District: Kalachyovsky District
- Time zone: UTC+4:00

Bratsky (Russian: Братский) is a rural locality (a khutor) in Krepinskoye Rural Settlement, Kalachyovsky District, Volgograd Oblast, Russia. The population was 312 as of 2010. There are 4 streets.

== Geography ==
Bratsky is located 68 km south of Kalach-na-Donu (the district's administrative centre) by road. Beloglinsky is the nearest rural locality.
