= Nikolay Osadchy =

Russian politician

Nikolay Osadchy MP
- Николай Осадчий
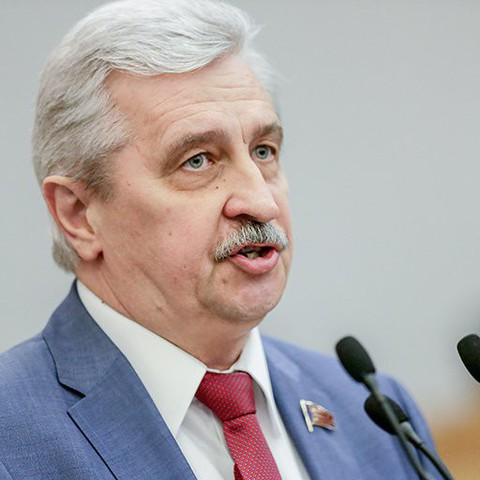

Member of the State Duma
- Incumbent
- Assumed office 5 October 2016

Personal details
- Born: 8 December 1957 (age 68) Tuapse, RSFSR, USSR
- Party: Communist
- Education: Moscow State University (PhD)
- Occupation: Professor

Nikolay Ivanovich Osadchy (Russian: Николай Иванович Осадчий; born 8 December 1957, Tuapse, Krasnodar Krai) is a Russian politician and professor serving as deputy of the State Duma. In 1984, he was granted a Candidate of Sciences degree in philosophy.

Osadchy began his career as a professor of philosophy at Kuban State University. In 1985, he started teaching history, sociology and philosophy at the Kuban State Medical University. In 1988, Osadchy joined the Communist Party of the Soviet Union. In 1995, he became the first secretary of the Krasnodar Krai branch of the Communist Party of the Russian Federation. From 1998 to 2015, he was the deputy of the Legislative Assembly of Krasnodar Krai of the 2nd, 3rd, 4th, and 5th convocations, respectively. In 2016, Osadchy was elected deputy of the 7th State Duma from the Krasnodar Krai convocation. He was re-elected in September 2021 for the 8th State Duma.

== Sanctions ==
He was sanctioned by Canada under the Special Economic Measures Act (S.C. 1992, c. 17) in relation to the Russian invasion of Ukraine for Grave Breach of International Peace and Security, and by the UK government in 2022 in relation to the Russo-Ukrainian War.
