= Novopokrovskaya =

Novopokrovskaya Новопокровская
- Stanitsa
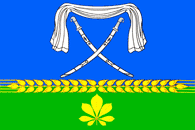
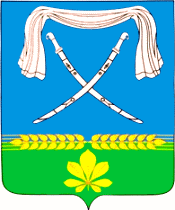
- Flag Coat of arms
- Interactive map of Novopokrovskaya
- Location of Novopokrovskaya Novopokrovskaya (Krasnodar Krai)
- Coordinates: 45°57′N 40°42′E
- Country: Russia
- Federal subject: Krasnodar Krai
- Administrative district: Novopokrovsky District
- Founded: 1827
- Elevation: 66 m (217 ft)

Population (2010 Census)
  - Total: 19,684
  - Estimate (2021): 18,559 (−5.7%)

Administrative status
  - Capital of: Novopokrovsky District
- Time zone: UTC+3 (MSK)
- Postal code: 353021
- OKTMO ID: 03635419101

Novopokrovskaya (Russian: Новопокровская) is a rural locality (a stanitsa) and the administrative center of Novopokrovsky District of Krasnodar Krai, Russia, located on the Yeya River. Population: 19,684 (2010 census); 19,095 (2002 census); 18,643 (1989 Soviet census).

== Notable people ==
- Andrey Alekseyenko (born 1978), Russian politician
- Vyacheslav Vorobyov (1962–2026), Russian footballer
