= Vyselkovsky District =

Vyselkovsky District Выселковский район (Russian)
- District
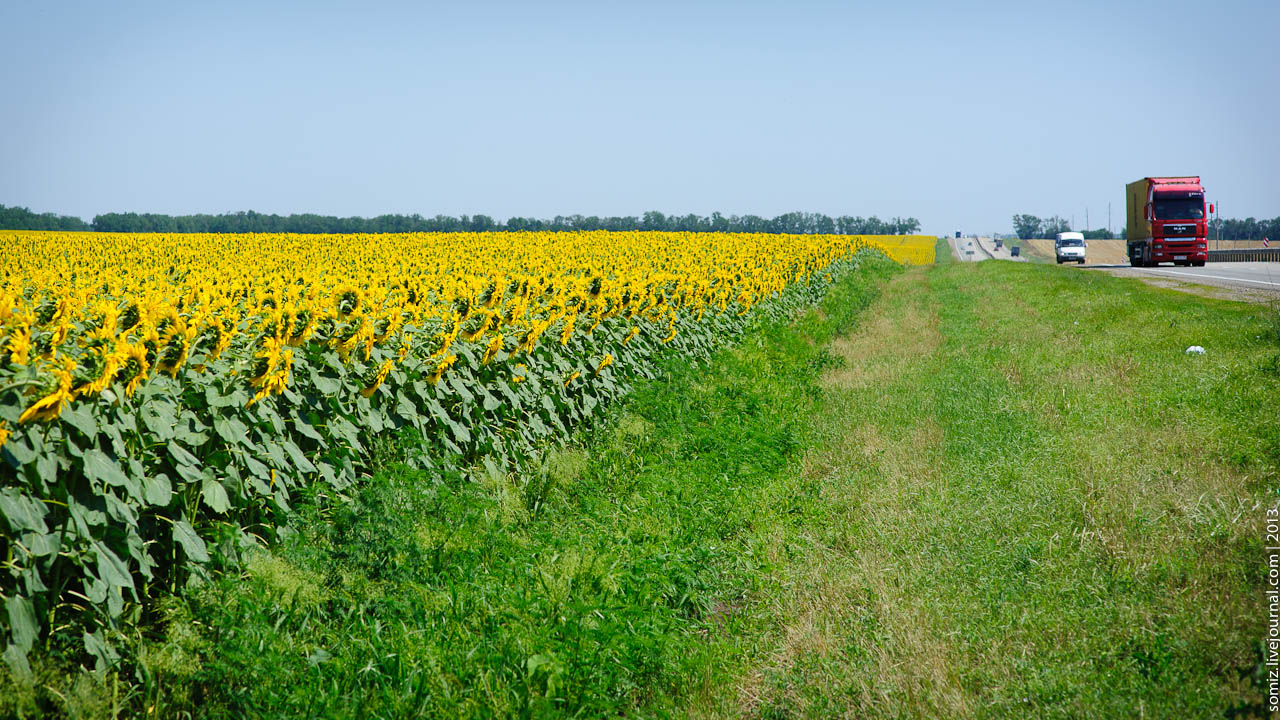
- Sunflower field, Vyselkovsky District

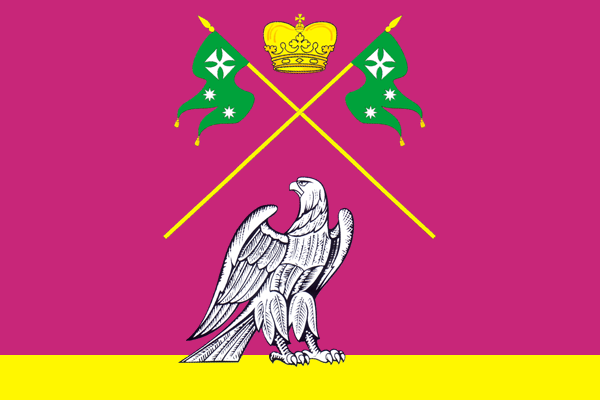
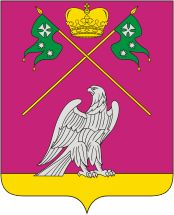
- Flag Coat of arms
- Location of Vyselkovsky District in Krasnodar Krai
- Coordinates: 45°34′42″N 39°39′29″E
- Country: Russia
- Federal subject: Krasnodar Krai
- Established: 31 December 1934
- Administrative center: Vyselki

Area
  - Total: 1,730 km^{2} (670 sq mi)

Population (2010 Census)
  - Total: 60,271
  - Density: 34.8/km^{2} (90.2/sq mi)
  - Urban: 0%
  - Rural: 100%

Administrative structure
  - Administrative divisions: 10 Rural okrugs
  - Inhabited localities: 25 rural localities

Municipal structure
  - Municipally incorporated as: Vyselkovsky Municipal District
  - Municipal divisions: 0 urban settlements, 10 rural settlements
- Time zone: UTC+3 (MSK)
- OKTMO ID: 03612000
- Website: http://viselki.net/

Vyselkovsky District (Russian: Выселковский райо́н) is an administrative district (raion), one of the thirty-eight in Krasnodar Krai, Russia. As a municipal division, it is incorporated as Vyselkovsky Municipal District. It is located in the center of the krai. The area of the district is 1,730 square kilometers (670 sq mi). Its administrative center is the rural locality (a stanitsa) of Vyselki. Population: 60,271 (2010 census); 60,239 (2002 census); 59,436 (1989 Soviet census). The population of Vyselki accounts for 32.2% of the district's total population.
