= Korenovsky District =

Korenovsky District Кореновский район (Russian)
- District
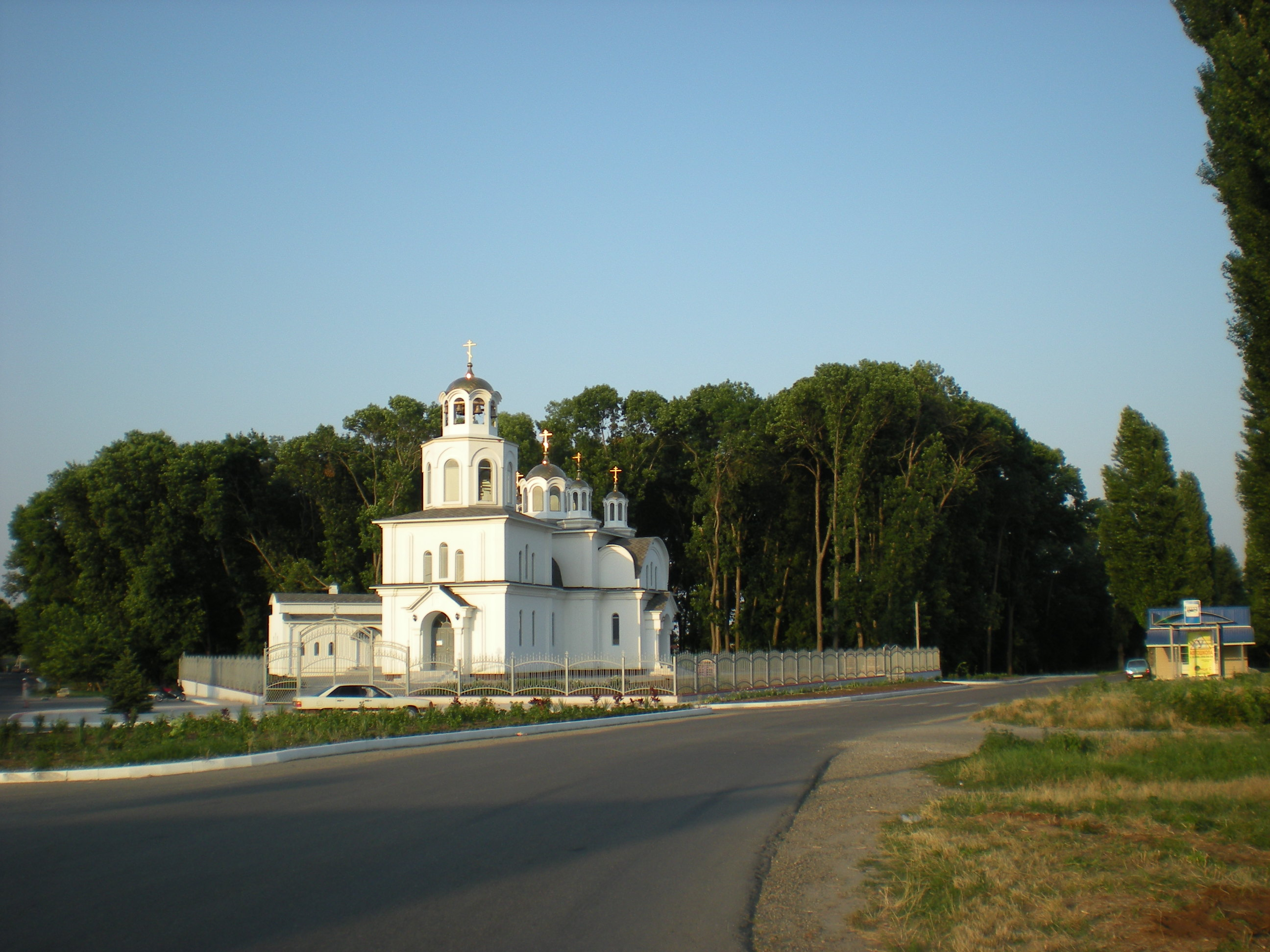
- Church in Korenovsk, Korenovsky District

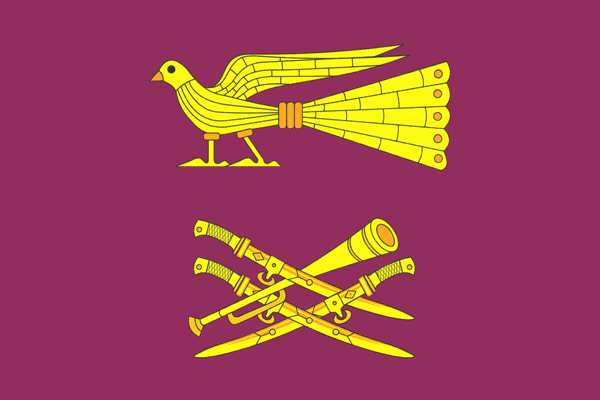
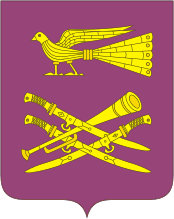
- Flag Coat of arms
- Location of Korenovsky District in Krasnodar Krai
- Coordinates: 45°27′57″N 38°27′04″E
- Country: Russia
- Federal subject: Krasnodar Krai
- Established: 2 June 1924
- Administrative center: Korenovsk

Area
  - Total: 1,433 km^{2} (553 sq mi)

Population (2010 Census)
  - Total: 85,264
  - Density: 59.50/km^{2} (154.1/sq mi)
  - Urban: 48.3%
  - Rural: 51.7%

Administrative structure
  - Administrative divisions: 1 Towns, 9 Rural okrugs
  - Inhabited localities: 1 cities/towns, 29 rural localities

Municipal structure
  - Municipally incorporated as: Korenovsky Municipal District
  - Municipal divisions: 1 urban settlements, 9 rural settlements
- Time zone: UTC+3 (MSK)
- OKTMO ID: 03621000
- Website: http://www.korenovsk.ru/

Korenovsky District (Russian: Корено́вский райо́н) is an administrative district (raion), one of the thirty-eight in Krasnodar Krai, Russia. As a municipal division, it is incorporated as Korenovsky Municipal District. It is located in the center of the krai. The area of the district is 1,433 square kilometers (553 sq mi). Its administrative center is the town of Korenovsk. Population: 85,264 (2010 census); 85,259 (2002 census); 77,131 (1989 Soviet census). The population of Korenovsk accounts for 48.3% of the district's total population.
