= Vladimir Beketov =

Russian politician (born 1949)

- Владимир Бекетов
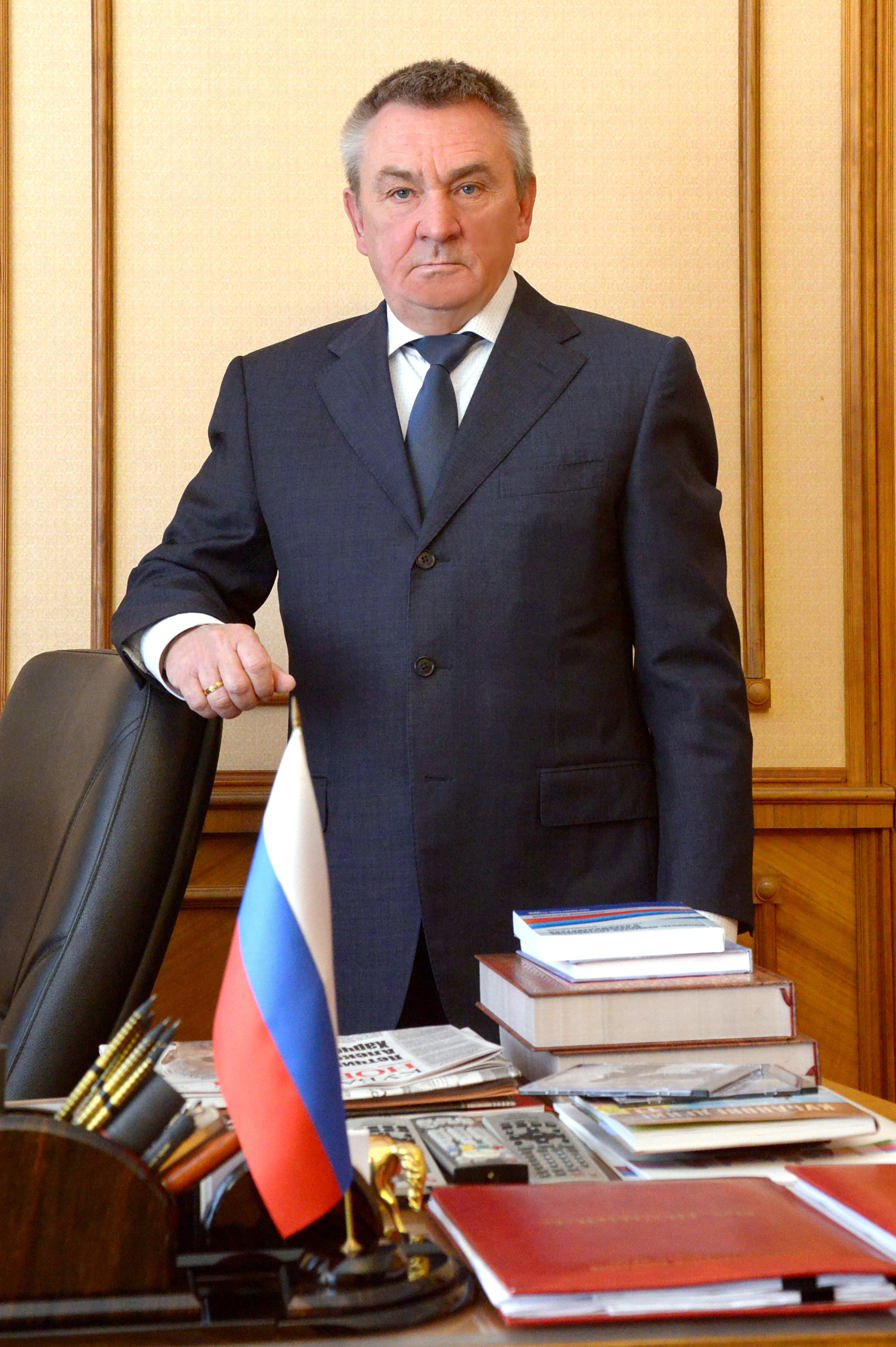
- Beketov in 2014

Senator from Krasnodar Krai
- In office 28 September 2017 – 16 September 2022
- Preceded by: Vladimir Kharlamov
- Succeeded by: Alexander Trembitsky

Personal details
- Born: Vladimir Beketov; 3 March 1949 (age 77) Uspensky District, Krasnodar Krai, Russian Soviet Federative Socialist Republic, Soviet Union
- Party: United Russia
- Education: Kuban State Agrarian University

Vladimir Andreevich Beketov (Russian: Владимир Андреевич Бекетов; born 3 March 1949) is a Russian politician who served as a senator from Krasnodar Krai from 2017 to 2022. He was re-elected as a deputy in the Legislative Assembly of Krasnodar Krai in September 2022.

== Biography ==
Vladimir Beketov was born on 17 August 1959 in Uspensky District, Krasnodar Krai. In 1976, he graduated from the Kuban State Agrarian University. In 1967, he served in the Soviet navy. Afterwards, he worked in the local kolkhoz. From 1975 to 1980, he was the second secretary of the Uspenskii district of the Komsomol. In 1992, he became the deputy of the Council of People's Deputies of the Krasnodar Krai. From 1991 to 1995, he was the head of the Uspensky District administration. On November 20, 1994, he was elected to the Legislative Assembly of Krasnodar Krai of the 1st convocation. On 2 December 2007, Beketov became the deputy of the Legislative Assembly of the IV convocation for the Eastern District. On 28 September 2017, he became a senator elected by the Legislative Assembly of Krasnodar Krai. On 16 September 2022, Beketov early terminated his duties.

As of October 2022, Beketov was a vice-speaker of the Legislative Assembly of Krasnodar Krai.

Vladimir Beketov is under personal sanctions introduced by the European Union, the United Kingdom, the USA, Canada, Switzerland, Australia, Ukraine, New Zealand, for ratifying the decisions of the "Treaty of Friendship, Cooperation and Mutual Assistance between the Russian Federation and the Donetsk People's Republic and between the Russian Federation and the Luhansk People's Republic" and providing political and economic support for Russia's annexation of Ukrainian territories.

== Awards and titles ==
- 2004 - Order of Honour
- 2009 - Order "For Merit to the Fatherland", IV degree
- 2017 - Order of Alexander Nevsky
- 1999 - Order "For Merit to the Fatherland", II degree
- 2019 - Certificate of Honor of the Government of the Russian Federation
- "Hero of labor of Kuban"
- Honorary citizen of the Uspensky district of the Krasnodar Territory, as well as those located near the village of Konokovo and the village of Urupsky
