= Beloglinsky District =

Beloglinsky District Белоглинский район (Russian)
- District
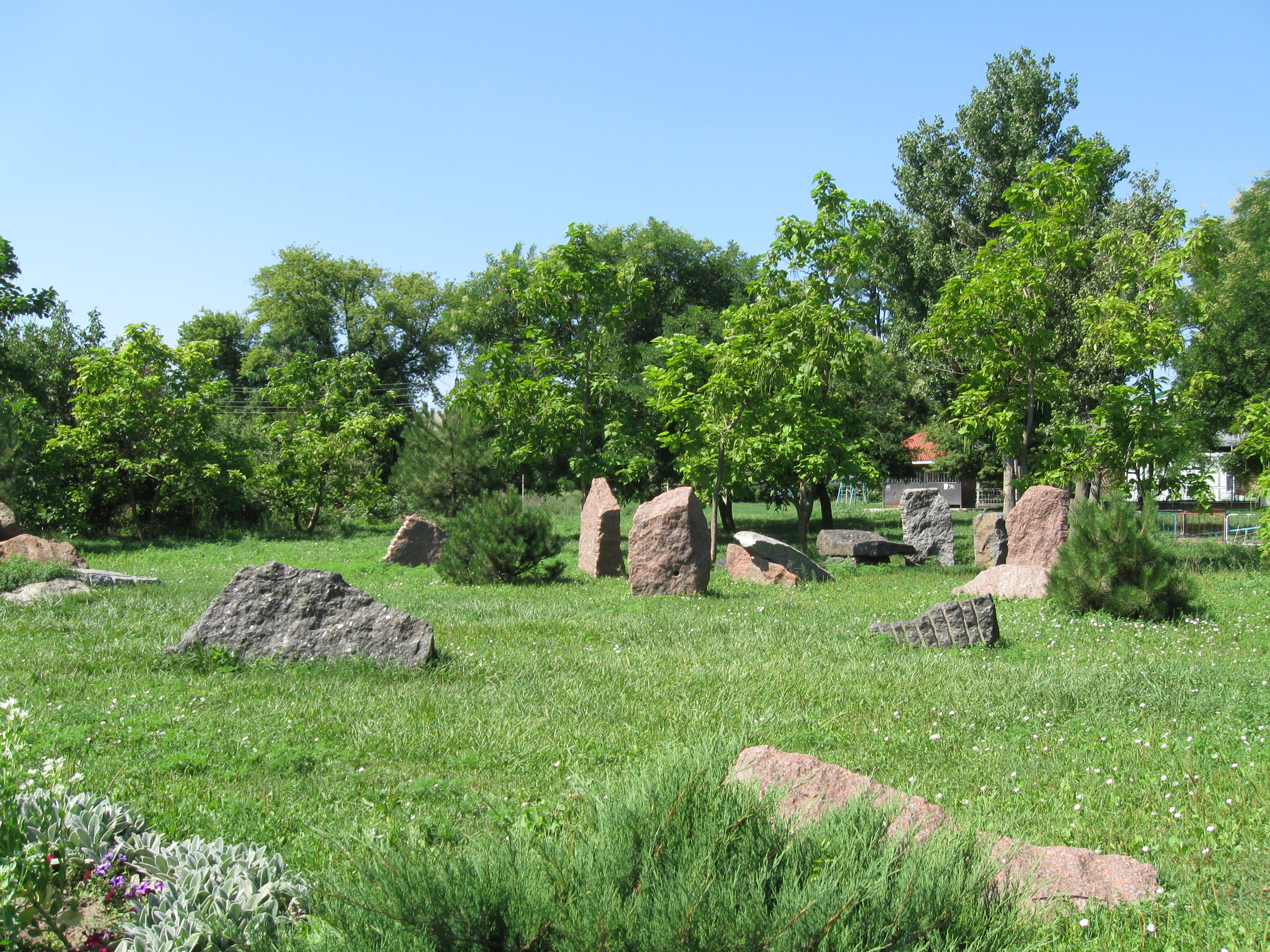
- Park in Belaya Glina, Beloglinsky District

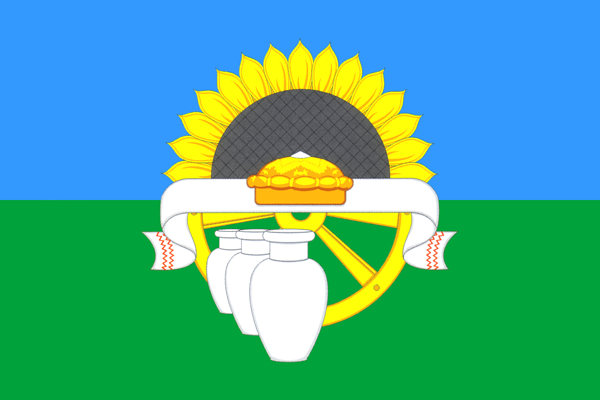
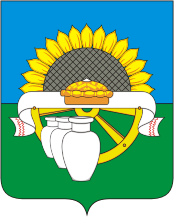
- Flag Coat of arms
- Location of Beloglinsky District in Krasnodar Krai
- Coordinates: 46°00′N 40°59′E
- Country: Russia
- Federal subject: Krasnodar Krai
- Established: 1924
- Administrative center: Belaya Glina

Area
  - Total: 1,470 km^{2} (570 sq mi)

Population (2010 Census)
  - Total: 31,303
  - Density: 21.3/km^{2} (55.2/sq mi)
  - Urban: 0%
  - Rural: 100%

Administrative structure
  - Administrative divisions: 3 Rural okrugs, 1 Stanitsa okrugs
  - Inhabited localities: 14 rural localities

Municipal structure
  - Municipally incorporated as: Beloglinsky Municipal District
  - Municipal divisions: 0 urban settlements, 4 rural settlements
- Time zone: UTC+3 (MSK)
- OKTMO ID: 03607000
- Website: http://www.belaya-glina.ru/

Beloglinsky District (Russian: Белогли́нский райо́н) is an administrative district (raion), one of the thirty-eight in Krasnodar Krai, Russia. As a municipal division, it is incorporated as Beloglinsky Municipal District. It is located in the east of the krai. The area of the district is 1,470 square kilometers (570 sq mi). Its administrative center is the rural locality of (a selo) of Belaya Glina. Population: 31,296 (2010 census); 33,477 (2002 census); 33,459 (1989 Soviet census). The population of Belaya Glina accounts for 55.3% of the district's total population.
