= Ust-Labinsky District =

Ust-Labinsky District Усть-Лабинский район (Russian)
- District
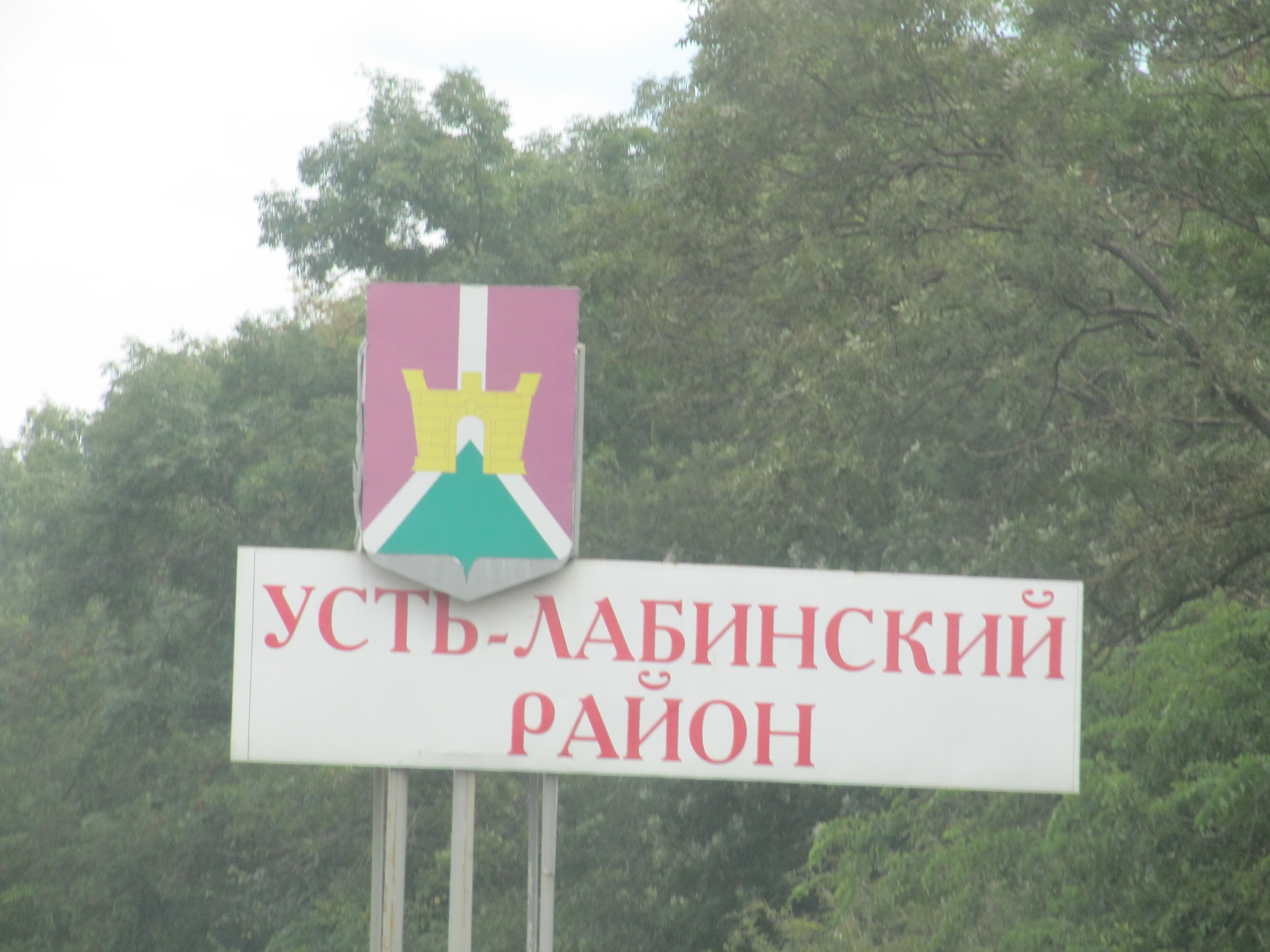
- Welcome sign at the entrance to Ust-Labinsky District

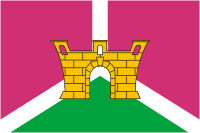
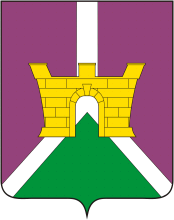
- Flag Coat of arms
- Location of Ust-Labinsky District in Krasnodar Krai
- Coordinates: 45°12′N 39°42′E
- Country: Russia
- Federal subject: Krasnodar Krai
- Established: 1924
- Administrative center: Ust-Labinsk

Area
  - Total: 1,511 km^{2} (583 sq mi)

Population (2010 Census)
  - Total: 112,900
  - Density: 74.72/km^{2} (193.5/sq mi)
  - Urban: 38.3%
  - Rural: 61.7%

Administrative structure
  - Administrative divisions: 1 Towns, 13 Rural okrugs
  - Inhabited localities: 1 cities/towns, 38 rural localities

Municipal structure
  - Municipally incorporated as: Ust-Labinsky Municipal District
  - Municipal divisions: 1 urban settlements, 14 rural settlements
- Time zone: UTC+3 (MSK)
- OKTMO ID: 03657000
- Website: http://www.adminustlabinsk.ru/

Ust-Labinsky District (Russian: Усть-Лабинский райо́н) is an administrative district (raion), one of the thirty-eight in Krasnodar Krai, Russia. As a municipal division, it is incorporated as Ust-Labinsky Municipal District. It is located in the center of the krai. The area of the district is 1,511 square kilometers (583 sq mi). Its administrative center is the town of Ust-Labinsk. Population: 112,900 (2010 census); 115,442 (2002 census); 100,770 (1989 Soviet census). The population of Ust-Labinsk accounts for 38.3% of the district's total population.
