= Vyselki, Krasnodar Krai =

Vyselki Выселки
- Stanitsa
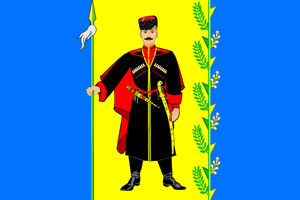
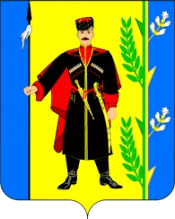
- Flag Coat of arms
- Interactive map of Vyselki
- Location of Vyselki Vyselki (Krasnodar Krai)
- Coordinates: 45°35′N 39°40′E
- Country: Russia
- Federal subject: Krasnodar Krai
- Administrative district: Vyselkovsky District
- Founded: 1892
- Elevation: 53 m (174 ft)

Population (2010 Census)
  - Total: 19,426
  - Estimate (2021): 19,955 (+2.7%)

Administrative status
  - Capital of: Vyselkovsky District
- Time zone: UTC+3 (MSK)
- Postal code: 353100–353103
- OKTMO ID: 03612413101

Vyselki (Russian: Выселки) is a rural locality (a stanitsa) and the administrative center of Vyselkovsky District of Krasnodar Krai, Russia. Population: 18,746 (2020), 19,426 (2010 census); 18,507 (2002 census); 17,683 (1989 Soviet census).
