= Legislative Assembly of Krasnodar Krai =

Regional parliament of Krasnodar Krai, Russia

Legislative Assembly of Krasnodar Krai Законодательное собрание Краснодарского края
- 7th legislature

Type
- Type: Unicameral

Leadership
- Chairman: Yury Burlachko, United Russia since 28 September 2017

Structure
- Seats: 70
- Political groups: United Russia (62) LDPR (3); SRZP (2); CPRF (2) Party of Growth (1)

Elections
- Voting system: Mixed
- Last election: 11 September 2022
- Next election: 2027

Meeting place
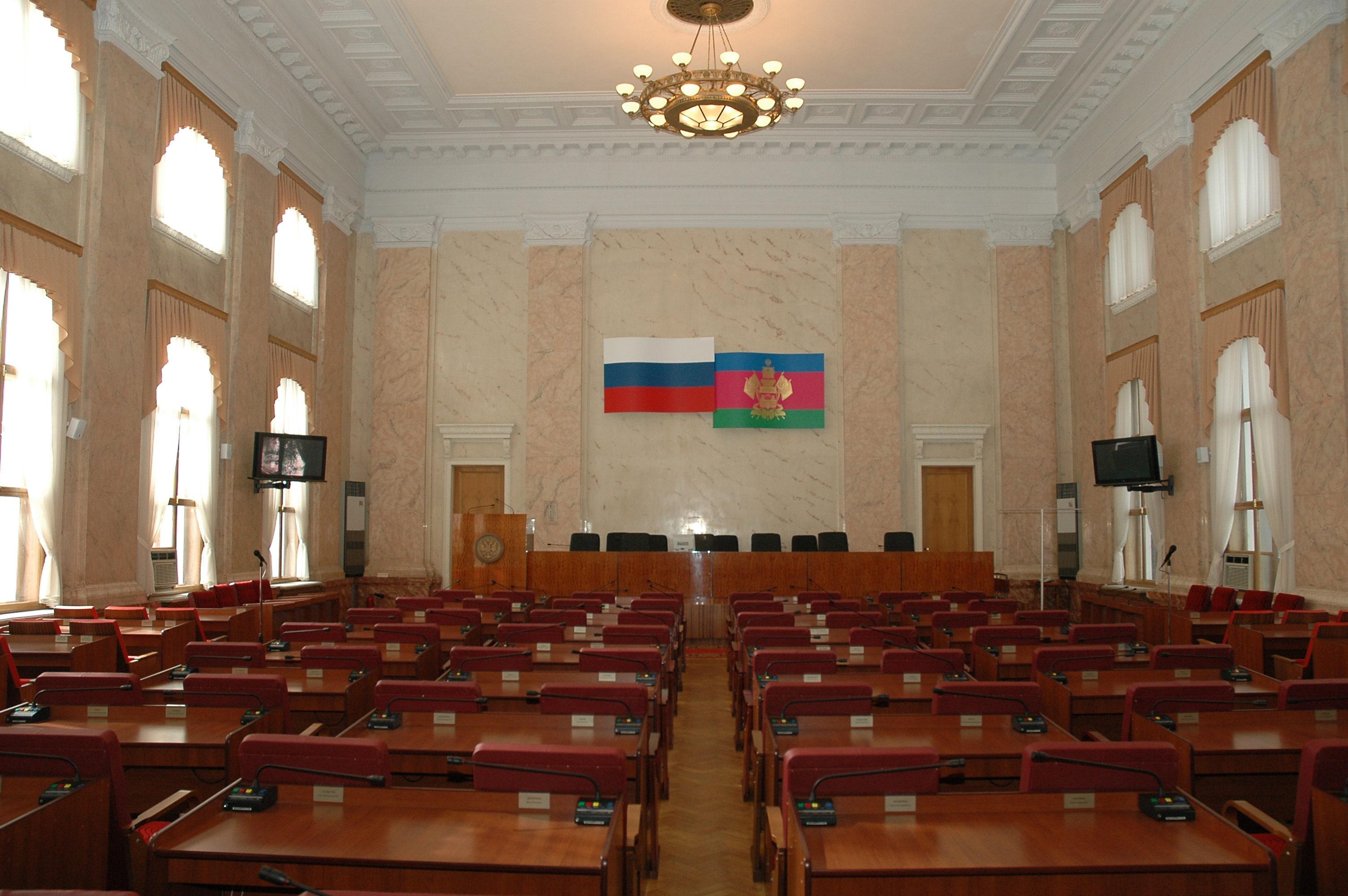
- 3 Red Street, Krasnodar

Website
- http://www.kubzsk.ru

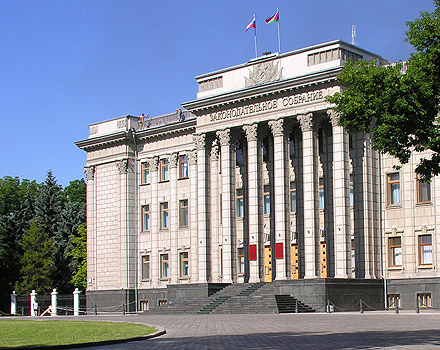
The Legislative Assembly building

The Legislative Assembly of Krasnodar Krai (Russian: Законодательное собрание Краснодарского края, ЗСК, romanized: Zakonodatel'noye sobraniye Krasnodarskogo kraya, ZSK) is the regional parliament of Krasnodar Krai, a federal subject of Russia. The assembly exercises its authority by passing laws, resolutions, and other legal acts and by supervising the implementation and observance of the laws and other legal acts passed by it.

The assembly consists of 70 deputies elected for a term of five years; 35 members are elected by single-member constituencies and another 35 deputies are elected in party lists.

== History ==
Election of deputies of the Legislative Assembly of the first convocation was held on 20 November 1994. The Legislative Assembly began on 14 December 1994, composing of 50 deputies. The first Chairman of the Legislative Assembly elected was Alexey Bagmut. From December 1995 to September 2017, the Parliament of the Kuban was headed by Vladimir Beketov. The same composition - 50 members - worked the Legislative Assembly of the second convocation.

On 24 November 2002, elections of deputies to the Legislative Assembly of the third convocation were held for 70 constituencies.

On 2 December 2007, elections of deputies of the Legislative Assembly of the fourth convocation were held. 70 deputies were elected under a mixed system: 35 deputies in single-mandate districts (in all districts won by representatives of United Russia) and 35 deputies - on party lists. United Russia won 26 seats out of 35. The Communist party won six seats and A Just Russia won 3 seats.

Elections of deputies of the Legislative Assembly of the fifth convocation were held on 14 October 2012. The number of deputies was increased to 100: 50 deputies in single-mandate constituencies and 50 in a party list. The Parliament passed the representatives of two political parties: United Russia with 95 seats and the Communist party with 5 seats.

Elections of the Legislative Assembly of the sixth convocation were held on 10 September 2017. The number of deputies was again reduced to 70. United Russia won the election with 60 seats, the Communist party and the Liberal Democratic party won 3 seats, A Just Russia and the Party of Growth won 1 seat, as well as 2 independent members. Yury Burlachenko was elected as Chairman of the Legislative Assembly.

== Elections ==
=== 2017 ===
Party	%	Seats
United Russia	70.78	60
Communist Party of the Russian Federation	11.53	3
Liberal Democratic Party of Russia	11.15	3
Self-nominated	—	2
A Just Russia	3.46	1
Party of Growth	—	1
Communists of Russia	1.54	0
Registered voters/turnout	42.03	

=== 2022 ===
Party	%	Seats
United Russia	70.80	62
Communist Party of the Russian Federation	10.76	2
Liberal Democratic Party of Russia	6.63	3
A Just Russia — For Truth	5.78	2
Party of Growth	—	1
New People	4.86	0
Registered voters/turnout	53.31	

== List of chairmen ==
№	Portrait	Name	Period		Party	Legislature
1		Alexey Bagmut	14 December 1994	December 1995	Independent	I (1994)
2		Vladimir Beketov	December 1995	10 September 2017	United Russia	I (1994)
2		Vladimir Beketov	December 1995	10 September 2017	United Russia	II (1998)
2		Vladimir Beketov	December 1995	10 September 2017	United Russia	III (2002)
2		Vladimir Beketov	December 1995	10 September 2017	United Russia	IV (2007)
2		Vladimir Beketov	December 1995	10 September 2017	United Russia	V (2012)
3		Yury Burlachko	28 September 2017	Incumbent	United Russia	VI (2017)
3		Yury Burlachko	28 September 2017	Incumbent	United Russia	VII (2022)
