= Krasnodar Krai Head of Administration elections =

The first election for governor of Krasnodar took place in 1996 as part of the series of Russian regional elections held in 1996–1997. For many Russian Oblasts and Krais, including Krasnodar Krai, these were the first elections of governors.

== Election of 1996 ==
=== First attempt ===
27 October 1996

Nikolai Yegorov and Nikolai Kondratenko were the two main candidates. Yegorov represented Yeltsin's administration and Kondratenko ran with the support of parties opposed to Yeltsin. The result was:

Voter turnout: 43.3%
Distribution of ballots:

Name	Percentage
Nikolai Kondratenko	57.14%
Nikolai Yegorov	24.77%
Viktor Krokhmal	7.79%
Boris Vavilov	2.3%
Yevgeny Kharitonov	2%
Vasiliy Dyakonov	1.1%

Mikhail Kurkov from Sochi was a candidate but withdrew in Kondratenko's favour. Aleksandr Tkachyov from Vyselki also ran, but withdrew in Yegorov's favour. The election failed because the electoral laws of Krasnodar Krai required participation of at least 50% of the citizens eligible to vote. On the next day the local parliament tried to reduce the threshold to 25% in order to finalize the election. It looked strange to change the law post facto, but although the results were not official it seemed to be legal. But Yegorov vetoed the reduction, and the parliament could pass the veto only some time later, when the first vote was officially declared to have failed.

=== Second attempt ===
The second vote was set for 22 December 1996. It was obvious that Kondratenko would run again, but Yegorov ran against him even though he seemed to have no chance. The results bore that out: his loss was even worse than in October.

22 December 1996

Citizens eligible to vote - 3,795,309
Ballots taken - 1,845,768 (48.63% voter turnout)
Ballots found in boxes - 1,842,259
Valid ballots - 1,822,520

Candidate	Ballots for	Percentage
Nikolai Kondratenko	1,510,652	82.00%
Viktor Krokhmal	132,291	7.18%
Nikolai Yegorov	88,969	4.83%
Boris Vavilov	26,224	1.42%
Vasiliy Dyakonov	20,732	1.13%
Sergei Suslov	5,827	0.32%
Vladimir Pozdnyakov	2,513	0.14%
Against all [none of the above]	35,312	1.92%

Invalid ballots 19,739 1.07%

Although voter participation increased, it did not reach the old threshold. But as the threshold voting rate had been reduced to 25%, the second election was declared valid.

== Election of 2000 ==
Although very popular in Krasnodar Krai, Kondratenko refused to participate in the new race. His friends, colleagues, and many citizens tried to make him change his decision, but Kondratenko kept his intention to retire from governorship. On 3 December 2000, Tkachyov was elected the new governor. Running with Kondratenko's support and in the absence of serious rivals, he won easily.

Voter turnout: 46.73%

Name	Ballots for	Percentage
Aleksandr Tkachyov	1,467,305	81.78%
Igor Kramarenko	93,758	5.23%
Martiros Oganesyan	73,302	4.09%
Against all	127,133	7.09%

== Election of 2004 ==
The election should have taken place in December 2004, but Tkachyov and the local parliament scheduled it for 14 March 2004, the day of the presidential election. The official reason was to save money, but really Tkachyov wanted to piggyback on Vladimir Putin's popularity. The result was excellent for Tkachyov: neither he nor Kondratenko had ever received so many votes.

Participation - 2,376,396 (63.08% voter turnout)
Invalid ballots - 27,488 (1.16%)

Name	Ballots for	Percentage
Aleksandr Tkachyov	1,995,681	83.98%
Alexander Bondarenko	79,854	3.36%
Anatoly Pahomov	47,862	2.01%
Sergei Kirichenko	44,442	1.87%
Against all	181,069	7.62%

== Election of 2015 ==
In April 2015, the Governor Alexander Tkachov, was appointed Minister of Agriculture. In this connection, were appointed early election of the Governor and the acting Governor became Veniamin Kondratyev.

Candidates	Party	Votes	%
Veniamin Kondratyev	United Russia	1,512,162	83.64%
Nikolay Osadchy	Communist Party	142,447	7.88%
Viktor Ponomaryov	Party of Social Protection	30,097	1.66%
Andrey Rudenko	A Just Russia	57,551	3.18%
Dmitry Fisyuk	Liberal Democratic Party	34,241	1.89%

== Election of 2020 ==
Veniamin Kondratyev was re-elected for a second term.

Candidates	Party	Votes	%
Veniamin Kondratyev	United Russia	2,401,266	82.97%
Alexander Safronov	Communist Party of the Russian Federation	237,696	8.21%
Ivan Tutushkin	Liberal Democratic Party of Russia	126,205	4.36%
Denis Khmelevskoy	A Just Russia	53,885	1.86%
Oleg Lugin	Party of Growth	46,869	1.62%
