= South-Eastern constituency (Krasnodar Krai) =

Constituency of the State Duma of the Russian Federation

South-Eastern single-member constituency
- Constituency of the Russian State Duma
- Deputy: Aleksey Shtanichev; United Russia
- Federal subject: Krasnodar Krai
- Districts: Armavir, Kurganinsky, Labinsky, Mostovsky, Novokubansky, Otradnensky, Uspensky
- Voters: 444,743 (2026)

The South-Eastern constituency (No.55 (Note: Armavir constituency No.39 in 1993-1995, Armavir constituency No.38 in 1995-2003, Armavir constituency No.40 in 2003-2007, Armavir constituency No.52 in 2016–2026)) is a Russian legislative constituency in Krasnodar Krai. The constituency covers south-eastern Krasnodar Krai, including the towns of Armavir and Labinsk.

The constituency has been represented since 2026 by United Russia deputy Aleksey Shtanichev, former Member of Legislative Assembly of Krasnodar Krai and businessman, who won the open seat, succeeding one-term United Russia incumbent Andrey Doroshenko.

== Boundaries ==
1993–2003 Armavir constituency: Armavir, Gulkevichsky District, Kurganinsky District, Labinsk, Labinsky District, Mostovsky District, Novokubansky District, Otradnensky District, Uspensky District
The constituency covered predominantly rural south-eastern Krasnodar Krai, including the towns of Armavir and Labinsk.

2003–2007 Armavir constituency: Armavir, Kurganinsky District, Labinsk, Labinsky District, Mostovsky District, Novokubansky District, Otradnensky District, Uspensky District
After 2003 redistricting the constituency was slightly changed, losing Gulkevichsky District to Tikhoretsk constituency.

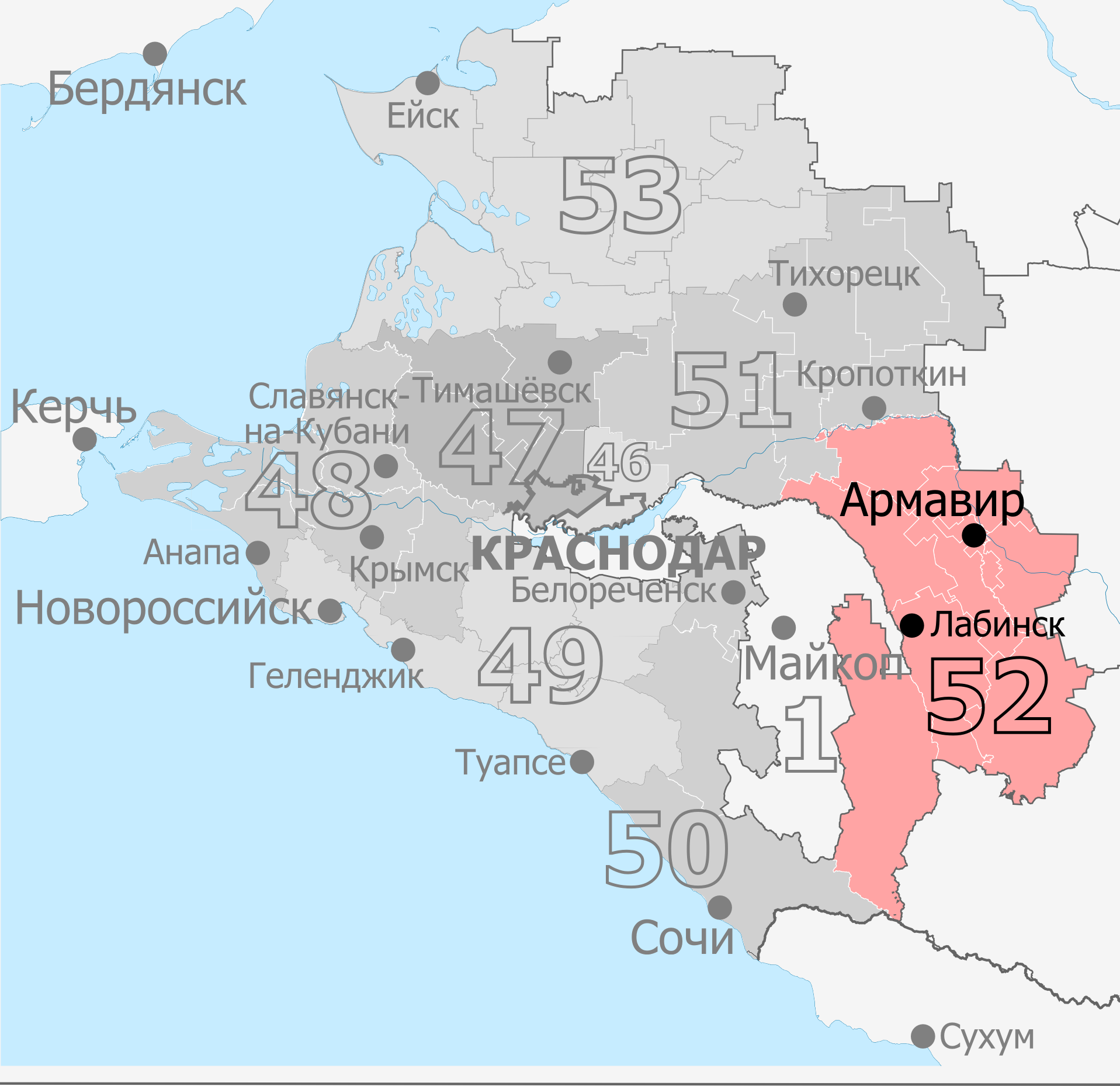
Constituency boundaries from 2016 to 2026

2016–2026 Armavir constituency: Armavir, Gulkevichsky District, Kurganinsky District, Labinsky District, Mostovsky District, Novokubansky District, Otradnensky District, Uspensky District
The constituency was re-created for the 2016 election. This seat was drawn in its 1993–2003 configuration, gaining Gulkevichsky District from Tikhoretsk constituency.

2026–present: Armavir, Kurganinsky District, Labinsky District, Mostovsky District, Novokubansky District, Otradnensky District, Uspensky District
The constituency was slightly altered after the 2025 redistricting, once again losing Gulkevichsky District to Eastern constituency and was renamed "South-Eastern constituency".

== Members elected ==
| Election | Member | Party |
|---|---|---|
| 1993 | Anatoly Dolgopolov | Independent |
| 1995 | Vladimir Pashuto | Trade Unions and Industrialists – Union of Labour |
| 1999 | Vladimir Pashuto | Communist Party |
| 2003 | Nikolay Litvinov | United Russia |
| 2007 | Proportional representation - no election by constituency | |
| 2011 | Proportional representation - no election by constituency | |
| 2016 | Nikolay Kharitonov | Communist Party |
| 2021 | Andrey Doroshenko | United Russia |
| 2026 | Aleksey Shtanichev | United Russia |

== Election results ==
=== 1993 ===
==== Declared candidates ====
- Anatoly Dolgopolov (Independent), cossack ataman, retired Soviet Army podpolkovnik
- Oleg Kalugin (Choice of Russia), former People's Deputy of the Soviet Union (1990–1991), retired KGB major general
- Irina Kirakozova (Independent), Deputy Mayor of Armavir
- Viktor Kolodyazhny (PRES), agricultural construction businessman
- Oleg Kotlyarov (Independent), Chairman of the Labinsk City Court (1984–present)
- Vladimir Pashuto (Independent), union leader
- Anatoly Poluektov (Independent), businessman
- Tatyana Solovyeva (Independent), journalist
- Aleksandr Tertyshnikov (Independent), banker
- Grigory Zezyulin (Independent), tekhnikum director

==== Results ====
Summary of the 12 December 1993 Russian legislative election in the Armavir constituency
| Candidate | Party | Votes | % |
|---|---|---|---|
| Anatoly Dolgopolov | Independent | 65,751 | 20.88% |
| Tatyana Solovyeva | Independent | 41,332 | 13.12% |
| Anatoly Poluektov | Independent | 35,696 | 11.34% |
| Grigory Zezyulin | Independent | 32,937 | 10.46% |
| Irina Kirakozova | Independent | 30,478 | 9.68% |
| Oleg Kalugin | Choice of Russia | 20,672 | 6.56% |
| Vladimir Pashuto | Independent | 19,688 | 6.25% |
| Viktor Kolodyazhny | Party of Russian Unity and Accord | 12,833 | 4.08% |
| Oleg Kotlyarov | Independent | 8,840 | 2.81% |
| Aleksandr Tertyshnikov | Independent | 7,577 | 2.41% |
| against all | | 16,860 | 5.35% |
| Total | | 314,914 | 100% |

=== 1995 ===
==== Declared candidates ====
- Viktor Babkin (KhDS–KhR), attorney
- Viktor Denisov (K–TR–zSS), locksmith
- Anatoly Dolgopolov (Independent), incumbent Member of State Duma (1994–present)
- Fyodor Inshakov (Independent), former People's Deputy of Russia (1990–1993), Armavir city hospital deputy chief doctor
- Vladimir Martynenko (APR), agriculture businessman
- Vladimir Pashuto (PPR–ST), union leader, 1993 candidate for this seat
- Raisa Rakhmail (SD), calculus associate professor
- Tatyana Solovyeva (NDR), journalist, 1993 candidate for this seat
- Georgy Troitsky (KDR), Mayor of Armavir (1992–present)
- Ivan Zabazanov (PST), nonprofit director
- Viktor Zhirinovsky (LDPR), party journalist, nephew of State Duma member Vladimir Zhirinovsky

==== Results ====
Summary of the 17 December 1995 Russian legislative election in the Armavir constituency
| Candidate | Party | Votes | % |
|---|---|---|---|
| Vladimir Pashuto | Trade Unions and Industrialists – Union of Labour | 72,858 | 20.92% |
| Viktor Zhirinovsky | Liberal Democratic Party | 48,261 | 13.86% |
| Tatyana Solovyeva | Our Home – Russia | 41,071 | 11.79% |
| Georgy Troitsky | Kedr | 36,195 | 10.39% |
| Anatoly Dolgopolov (incumbent) | Independent | 32,568 | 9.35% |
| Viktor Denisov | Communists and Working Russia - for the Soviet Union | 25,740 | 7.39% |
| Vladimir Martynenko | Agrarian Party | 23,110 | 6.64% |
| Viktor Babkin | Christian-Democratic Union - Christians of Russia | 15,059 | 4.32% |
| Fyodor Inshakov | Independent | 14,055 | 4.04% |
| Ivan Zabazanov | Party of Workers' Self-Government | 7,348 | 2.11% |
| Raisa Rakhmail | Social Democrats | 3,412 | 0.98% |
| against all | | 22,456 | 6.45% |
| Total | | 348,234 | 100% |

=== 1999 ===
==== Declared candidates ====
- Aleksey Andreyev (NDR), Member of State Duma (1996–present)
- Yury Belyayev (Yabloko), management professor
- Oleg Isayev (Independent), attorney
- Nikolay Kolosov (Independent), deputy chief of Armavir militsiya
- Sergey Kozaderov (OVR), farmer
- Vladimir Pashuto (CPRF), incumbent Member of State Duma (1996–present)
- Vladimir Rybalkin (LDPR), attorney
- Anatoly Silchenko (Independent), prosecutor
- Aleksandr Solovyev (Independent), Mayor of Novokubansk (1988–present)
- Vladimir Vakhaniya (Nikolayev–Fyodorov Bloc), nonprofit chairman

==== Did not file ====
- Viktor Chechentsev (DN)
- Aleksandr Mamontov (Independent)
- Yury Mikhaylov (Independent)
- Nikolay Popov (KTR–zSS)
- Vladimir Pozdnyakov (RSP), businessman, December 1996 gubernatorial candidate
- Anatoly Zyryanov (Independent)

==== Results ====
Summary of the 19 December 1999 Russian legislative election in the Armavir constituency
| Candidate | Party | Votes | % |
|---|---|---|---|
| Vladimir Pashuto (incumbent) | Communist Party | 113,143 | 35.47% |
| Nikolay Kolosov | Independent | 34,775 | 10.90% |
| Anatoly Silchenko | Independent | 30,314 | 9.50% |
| Aleksey Andreyev | Our Home – Russia | 29,419 | 9.22% |
| Oleg Isayev | Independent | 27,264 | 8.55% |
| Aleksandr Solovyev | Independent | 13,395 | 4.20% |
| Yury Belyayev | Yabloko | 13,008 | 4.08% |
| Vladimir Rybalkin | Liberal Democratic Party | 12,345 | 3.87% |
| Sergey Kozaderov | Fatherland – All Russia | 11,057 | 3.47% |
| Vladimir Vakhaniya | Andrey Nikolayev and Svyatoslav Fyodorov Bloc | 4,943 | 1.55% |
| against all | | 23,876 | 7.48% |
| Total | | 319,020 | 100% |

=== 2003 ===
==== Declared candidates ====
- Aleksandr Batayev (SPS), attorney
- Aleksandr Lazovsky (LDPR), entrepreneur
- Nikolay Litvinov (United Russia), Member of Legislative Assembly of Krasnodar Krai (2002–present), gas equipment plant director
- Andrey Mozzhegorov (ZRS), Armavir administration official
- Vladimir Pashuto (CPRF), incumbent Member of State Duma (1996–present)
- Aleksandr Prikhodchenko (ORP Rus'), unemployed

==== Failed to qualify ====
- Aleksandr Chernyavsky (Independent), accountant
- Viktor Semyonov (NPS RF), pensioner

==== Did not file ====
- Yury Ivanov (Independent), security executive
- Ivan Kudryashov (Independent), primary school counselor

==== Results ====
Summary of the 7 December 2003 Russian legislative election in the Armavir constituency
| Candidate | Party | Votes | % |
|---|---|---|---|
| Nikolay Litvinov | United Russia | 123,357 | 46.17% |
| Vladimir Pashuto (incumbent) | Communist Party | 62,517 | 23.40% |
| Andrey Mozzhegorov | For a Holy Russia | 18,882 | 7.07% |
| Aleksandr Lazovsky | Liberal Democratic Party | 15,399 | 5.76% |
| Aleksandr Batayev | Union of Right Forces | 8,134 | 3.04% |
| Aleksandr Prikhodchenko | United Russian Party Rus' | 3,494 | 1.31% |
| against all | | 30,944 | 11.58% |
| Total | | 267,491 | 100% |

=== 2016 ===
==== Declared candidates ====
- Aleksandr Blagodarnov (Party of Growth), agricultural executive
- Denis Dvornikov (The Greens), speechwriter to the Governor of Moscow Oblast (2013–present)
- Andrey Frolov (A Just Russia), former Member of Anapa Council (2010–2015), agricultural executive
- Viktoria Guseinova (CPCR), youth centre specialist
- Nikolay Kharitonov (CPRF), Member of State Duma (1994–present), Chairman of the Duma Committee on Regional Policy, Issues of the Arctic and the Far East (2011–present), 2004 presidential candidate
- Andrey Ovechkin (Patriots of Russia), farmer
- Yevgeny Pozdeyev (Yabloko), former Member of Komsomolsky Council (2009–2014), technician
- Aleksandr Vysich (LDPR), former Member of Gulkevichi City Council (2009–2014), computer science teacher
- Sergey Zakipnev (Rodina), Member of Mostovsky District Council (2004–present)

==== Declined ====
- Eduard Kuznetsov (United Russia), RSPP regional office executive director (lost the primary)
- Nikolay Titov (United Russia), Member of Legislative Assembly of Krasnodar Krai (2007–present), industrial executive (won the primary, ran on the party list)

==== Results ====
Summary of the 18 September 2016 Russian legislative election in the Armavir constituency
| Candidate | Party | Votes | % |
|---|---|---|---|
| Nikolay Kharitonov | Communist Party | 89,871 | 35.23% |
| Andrey Frolov | A Just Russia | 45,648 | 17.90% |
| Aleksandr Vysich | Liberal Democratic Party | 34,447 | 13.50% |
| Viktoria Guseinova | Communists of Russia | 19,918 | 7.81% |
| Aleksandr Blagodarnov | Party of Growth | 17,855 | 7.00% |
| Sergey Zakipnev | Rodina | 14,001 | 5.49% |
| Andrey Ovechkin | Patriots of Russia | 11,066 | 4.34% |
| Denis Dvornikov | The Greens | 6,794 | 2.66% |
| Yevgeny Pozdeyev | Yabloko | 5,899 | 2.31% |
| Total | | 255,082 | 100% |

=== 2021 ===
==== Declared candidates ====
- Grachik Davtyan (CPRF), Member of Novokubansky District Council (2020–present), municipal funeral home director
- Andrey Doroshenko (United Russia), Member of Legislative Assembly of Krasnodar Krai (2012–present), road transportation businessman
- Stanislav Grishin (Rodina), homeowners' association chairman
- Isa Ibragimov (New People), homemaker
- Nadezhda Kovalyova (LDPR), Member of Gelendzhik Duma (2018–present), aide to State Duma member Yury Napso
- Andrey Levashov (A Just Russia), individual entrepreneur
- Sergey Matveyev (RPPSS), Member of Medvedovskaya Council (2014–present), businessman
- Sergey Stepankov (Yabloko), checkpoint guard
- Natalya Tsybulskaya (Party of Growth), water utilities controller

==== Withdrawn candidates ====
- Viktor Statsenko (GP), former Member of Novokubansky District Council (2010–2015), individual entrepreneur

==== Declined ====
- Nikolay Kharitonov (CPRF), incumbent Member of State Duma (1994–present), Chairman of the Duma Committee on Regional Policy, Issues of the Arctic and the Far East (2011–present)

==== Results ====
Summary of the 17-19 September 2021 Russian legislative election in the Armavir constituency
| Candidate | Party | Votes | % |
|---|---|---|---|
| Andrey Doroshenko | United Russia | 271,669 | 68.16% |
| Grachik Davtyan | Communist Party | 44,502 | 11.16% |
| Nadezhda Kovalyova | Liberal Democratic Party | 19,288 | 4.84% |
| Andrey Levashov | A Just Russia — For Truth | 17,641 | 4.43% |
| Isa Ibragimov | New People | 11,772 | 2.95% |
| Sergey Matveyev | Party of Pensioners | 9,373 | 2.35% |
| Stanislav Grishin | Rodina | 8,606 | 2.16% |
| Natalya Tsybulskaya | Party of Growth | 5,211 | 1.31% |
| Sergey Stepankov | Yabloko | 3,811 | 0.96% |
| Total | | 398,599 | 100% |

=== 2026 ===
==== Declared candidates ====
- Vadim Beglaryan (LDPR), Member of Novokubansky District Council (2025–present), construction materials plant director
- Kristina Belyanskaya (A Just Russia), Member of Labinsk Council (2024–present), municipal youth centre director
- Roman Dedochev (CPRF), Member of Armavir City Duma (2025–present), party secretary
- Miko Kovbanin (The Greens), unemployed
- Aleksandr Makeyev (New People), Member of Armavir City Duma (2025–present), construction executive
- Aleksey Shtanichev (United Russia), Member of Legislative Assembly of Krasnodar Krai (2022–present), businessman

==== Declined ====
- Aleksandr Demchenko (United Russia), Chairman of the Labinsky District Council (2025–present), Member of the Council (2020–present) (lost the primary)
- Andrey Doroshenko (United Russia), incumbent Member of State Duma (2021–present)

==== Results ====
Summary of the 18-20 September 2026 Russian legislative election in the South-Eastern constituency
| Candidate | Party | Votes | % |
|---|---|---|---|
| Aleksey Shtanichev | United Russia | 231,240 | 64.78% |
| Roman Dedochev | Communist Party | 54,669 | 15.31% |
| Vadim Beglaryan | Liberal Democratic Party | 23,493 | 6.58% |
| Aleksandr Makeyev | New People | 21,773 | 6.10% |
| Kristina Belyanskaya | A Just Russia | 14,464 | 4.05% |
| Miko Kovbanin | The Greens | 8,316 | 2.33% |
| Total | | 356,966 | 100% |
