= Labinsky =

Labinsky (masculine), Labinskaya (feminine), or Labinskoye (neuter) may refer to:

== People ==
- Andrey Labinsky (1871–1941), Russian/Soviet tenor
- Numa Labinsky, one of the founders of Nimbus Records, a British record company

== Fictional characters ==
- Countess Labinsky, a character in the movie Moonraker played by Catherine Serre

== Places ==
- Labinsky District, a district of Krasnodar Krai, Russia
- Labinskoye Urban Settlement, a municipal formation which the Town of Labinsk in Krasnodar Krai, Russia is incorporated as
- Labinskaya, name of the town of Labinsk in Krasnodar Krai, Russia until 1947

== See also ==
- Ust-Labinsky (disambiguation)
