= 2025 Krasnodar Krai gubernatorial election =

Election in Russia

← 2020	12–14 September 2025	2030 →
- Turnout: 68.64% ▲0.61 pp
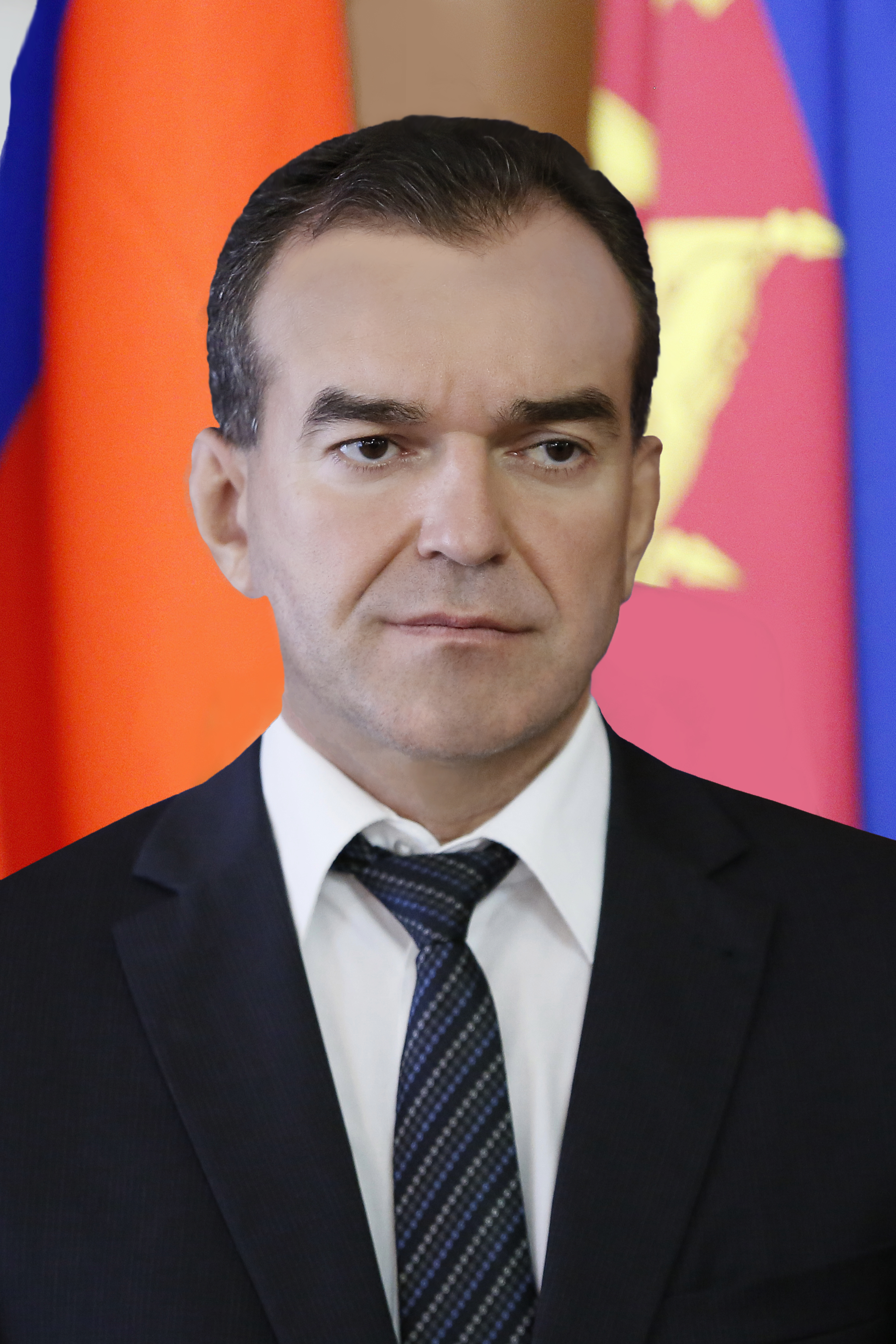

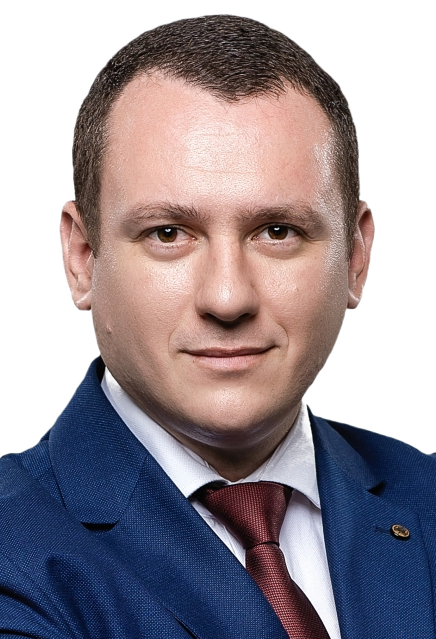
Candidate	Veniamin Kondratyev	Aleksandr Safronov
Party	United Russia	CPRF
Popular vote	2,551,614	262,711
Percentage	83.17%	8.56%
Governor before election
Veniamin Kondratyev
United Russia
Governor-elect
Veniamin Kondratyev
United Russia

The 2025 Krasnodar Krai gubernatorial election took place on 12–14 September 2025, on common election day. Incumbent Governor of Krasnodar Krai Veniamin Kondratyev was re-elected to a third term in office.

== Background ==
Veniamin Kondratyev, Deputy Head of the Directorate of the President of the Russian Federation and former Deputy Governor of Krasnodar Krai, was appointed acting Governor of Krasnodar Krai in April 2015 after three-term incumbent Alexander Tkachov was appointed Minister of Agriculture of Russia. Kondratyev, officially an Independent, was nominated for a full term by United Russia and won the September 2015 election with 83.64% of the vote. Governor Kondratyev was perceived as vulnerable prior to the 2020 election, however, he received the approval of President Vladimir Putin to run for a second term and won it with 82.97% as a United Russia candidate.

Initially Governor of Krasnodar Krai was limited for just two consecutive terms so Kondratyev would have been term-limited in 2025. However, in December 2021 "On Common Principles of Organisation of Public Authority in the Subjects of the Russian Federation" law was enacted, which lifted term limits for Russian governors. Krasnodar Krai followed suit and lifted the restrictions, which allowed Kondratyev to seek another term in 2025.

In December 2024 two tankers fell apart in the Kerch Strait, causing a massive oil spill that hit the resort town of Anapa in Krasnodar Krai. In January 2025 President Putin criticised the authorities of Krasnodar Krai for insufficient fuel oil cleanup efforts, which could cause challenges for Kondratyev's re-election. Experts also claimed that to run for another term Kondratyev should also overcome tensions in the local elite.

In March 2025 during a meeting with President Vladimir Putin Governor Kondratyev announced his intention to run for a third term and received Putin's endorsement.

== Candidates ==
In Krasnodar Krai candidates for Governor of Krasnodar Krai can be nominated only by registered political parties. Candidate for Governor of Krasnodar Krai should be a Russian citizen and at least 30 years old. Candidates for Governor of Krasnodar Krai should not have a foreign citizenship or residence permit. Each candidate in order to be registered is required to collect at least 10% of signatures of members and heads of municipalities. Also gubernatorial candidates present 3 candidacies to the Federation Council and election winner later appoints one of the presented candidates.

=== Declared ===
Candidate name, political party		Occupation	Status	Ref.
Denis Khmelevskoy; SR–ZP		Member of Legislative Assembly of Krasnodar Krai (2017–present); 2020 gubernatorial candidate	Registered	
Veniamin Kondratyev; United Russia	Veniamin Kondratyev	Incumbent Governor of Krasnodar Krai (2015–present)	Registered	
Aleksandr Safronov; Communist Party	Aleksandr Safronov	Member of Krasnodar City Duma (2020–present); Former Deputy Chairman of the City Duma (2020–2021); 2020 gubernatorial candidate	Registered	
Ivan Tutushkin; Liberal Democratic Party		Member of Legislative Assembly of Krasnodar Krai (2017–present); 2020 gubernatorial candidate	Registered	

=== Eliminated at the convention ===
- Anatoly Perepelin (United Russia), Head of Tikhoretsky District (2012–present)
- Andrey Vorushilin (United Russia), Head of Kurganinsky District (2015–present)

=== Declined ===
- Kaplan Panesh (LDPR), Member of State Duma (2021–present)
- Nikita Sirazetdinov (New People), aide to Deputy Chairman of the State Duma Vladislav Davankov

=== Candidates for Federation Council ===
Head candidate, political party	Candidates for Federation Council	Status
Veniamin Kondratyev; United Russia	* Aleksey Kondratenko, incumbent Senator (2015–present) * Vladimir Porkhanov, Member of Legislative Assembly of Krasnodar Krai (2012–present), Krasnodar Krai Clinical Hospital No.1 chief doctor (2004–present) * Yevgeny Shendrik, Member of Legislative Assembly of Krasnodar Krai (2012–present), Hero of Russia (2000)	Nominated

== Finances ==
All sums are in rubles.

Financial Report	Source	Khmelevskoy	Kondratyev	Safronov	Tutushkin
First		300,000	17,000,000	1,200,000	200,000
Final		1,335,000	50,000,000	7,340,610	573,000

== Polls ==
Fieldwork date	Polling firm	Kondratyev	Safronov	Tutushkin	Khmelevskoy	None	Lead
14 September 2025	2025 election	83.2	8.6	4.5	3.0	0.7	74.6
5–19 August 2025	WCIOM	74.1	13.2	6.7	3.2	2.8	60.9

== Results ==
Summary of the 12–14 September 2025 Krasnodar Krai gubernatorial election results
Candidate	Party	Votes	%
Veniamin Kondratyev (incumbent)	United Russia	2,551,614	83.17
Aleksandr Safronov	Communist Party	262,711	8.56
Ivan Tutushkin	Liberal Democratic Party	138,396	4.51
Denis Khmelevskoy	A Just Russia – For Truth	92,295	3.01
Valid votes		3,045,016	99.26
Blank ballots		22,847	0.74
Total		3,067,863	100.00
Turnout		3,067,863	68.64
Registered voters		4,469,620	100.00

Governor Kondratyev re-appointed incumbent Senator Aleksey Kondratenko (United Russia) to the Federation Council.

== See also ==
- 2025 Russian regional elections
