= Novokubansky =

Novokubansky (masculine), Novokubanskaya (feminine), or Novokubanskoye (neuter) may refer to:

- Novokubansky District, a district of Krasnodar Krai, Russia
- Novokubanskoye Urban Settlement, a municipal formation which the Town of Novokubansk in Novokubansky District of Krasnodar Krai, Russia is incorporated as
- Novokubansky (rural locality), a rural locality (a khutor) in Stavropol Krai, Russia
