= Governor of Krasnodar Krai =

Highest-ranking official in Krasnodar Krai, Russia

- Coat of arms of Krasnodar Krai

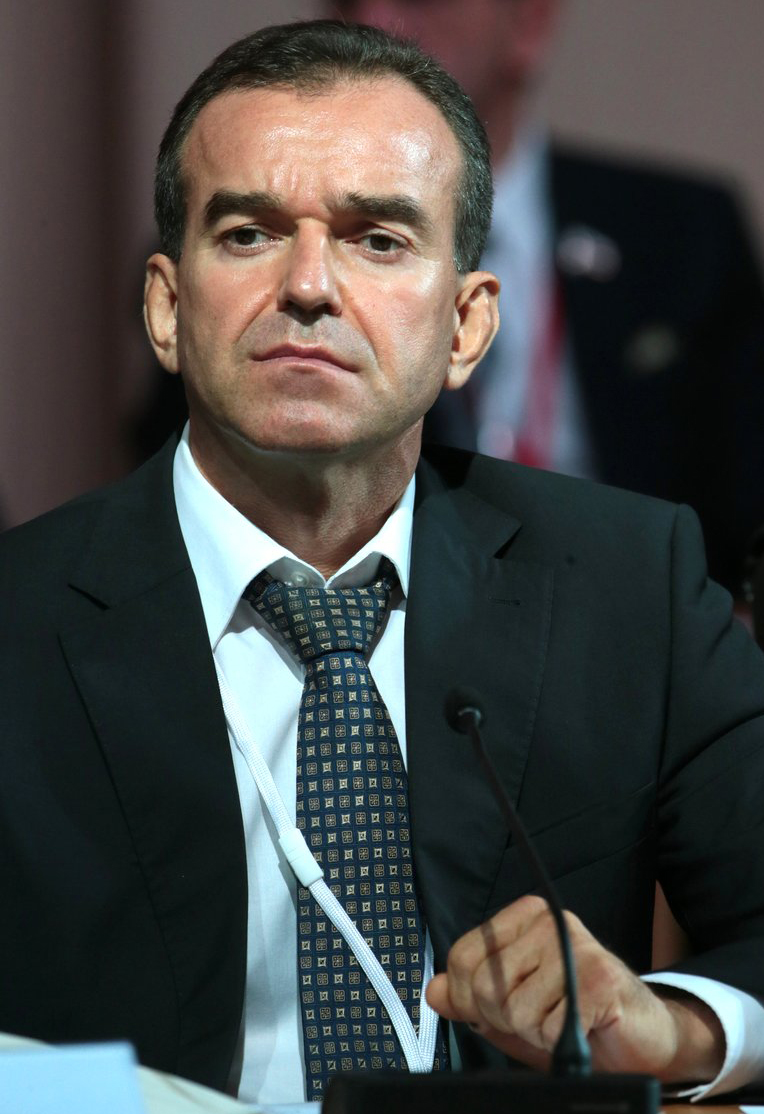
- Incumbent; Veniamin Kondratev since 22 April 2015
- Type: Head of federal subject
- Residence: 35, Red Street, Krasnodar
- Term length: Five years, renewable
- Constituting instrument: Charter of Krasnodar Krai, Section 4
- Inaugural holder: Vasily Dyakonov (1991)
- Website: admkrai.krasnodar.ru

The Governor of Krasnodar Krai (Russian: Губернатор Краснодарского края) is the highest post of executive power in Krasnodar Krai, a federal subject of Russia.

== List of governors ==
No.	Image	Governor	Tenure	Time in office	Party	Election
1		Vasily Dyakonov (1946–2012)	24 August 1991 – 9 December 1992 (removed)	1 year, 107 days	Independent (Note: Represented Democratic Russia coalition in the Congress of People's Deputies of Russia.)	Appointed
—		Viktor Kryuchkov (born 1946)	9 December 1992 – 23 December 1992	14 days	Independent	Acting
2		Nikolai Yegorov (1951–1997)	23 December 1992 – 18 June 1994 (resigned)	1 year, 177 days	Independent	Appointed
—		Viktor Gladskoy (1946–2015)	24 May 1994 – 18 June 1994	70 days	Independent	Acting for Yegorov
—		Viktor Gladskoy (1946–2015)	18 June 1994 – 2 August 1994	70 days	Independent	Acting
3		Yevgeny Kharitonov (born 1946)	2 August 1994 – 15 July 1996 (resigned)	1 year, 348 days	Our Home – Russia	Appointed
(2)		Nikolai Yegorov (1951–1997)	15 July 1996 – 5 January 1997 (lost election)	174 days	Independent	Appointed
4		Nikolai Kondratenko (1940–2013)	5 January 1997 – 5 January 2001 (retired)	4 years, 0 days	Fatherland (Note: Fatherland (Отечество), a populist "national patriotic" movement, had dominated regional politics in Krasnodar Krai from its creation in 1994 till the early 2000s. Kondratenko was later elected to the State Duma from Communist Party in 2003.)	~~Oct 1996~~ (Note: Annulled election); Dec 1996
5		Aleksandr Tkachyov (born 1960)	5 January 2001 – 22 April 2015 (resigned)	14 years, 107 days	Communist → United Russia (Note: Before his election Tkachyov represented Communist Party in the State Duma. He switched parties in 2004.)	2000; 2004; 2007 (Note: Appointed by the president of Russia with the consent of the Legislative Assembly.); 2012
—		Veniamin Kondratyev (born 1970)	22 April 2015 – 14 September 2015	11 years, 138 days	United Russia	Acting
6		Veniamin Kondratyev (born 1970)	14 September 2015 – present	11 years, 138 days	United Russia	2015; 2020; 2025

== Elections ==
The latest election for the office was held on 14 September 2025.

== Sources ==
- Kynev, Aleksandr (2020). Губернаторы в России: между выборами и назначениями [Governors in Russia: between elections and appointments] (PDF). Moscow: Фонд «Либеральная миссия». ISBN 978-5-903135-68-4. Archived from the original (PDF) on 2021-07-06.
