= Yevgeny Kharitonov =

Yevgeny Kharitonov may refer to:

- Yevgeny Kharitonov (politician) (born 1946), Russian politician
- Yevgeny Kharitonov (poet) (1941–1981), Russian poet
