= Vitaly Ignatenko =

Soviet journalist (born 1941)

- Виталий Игнатенко
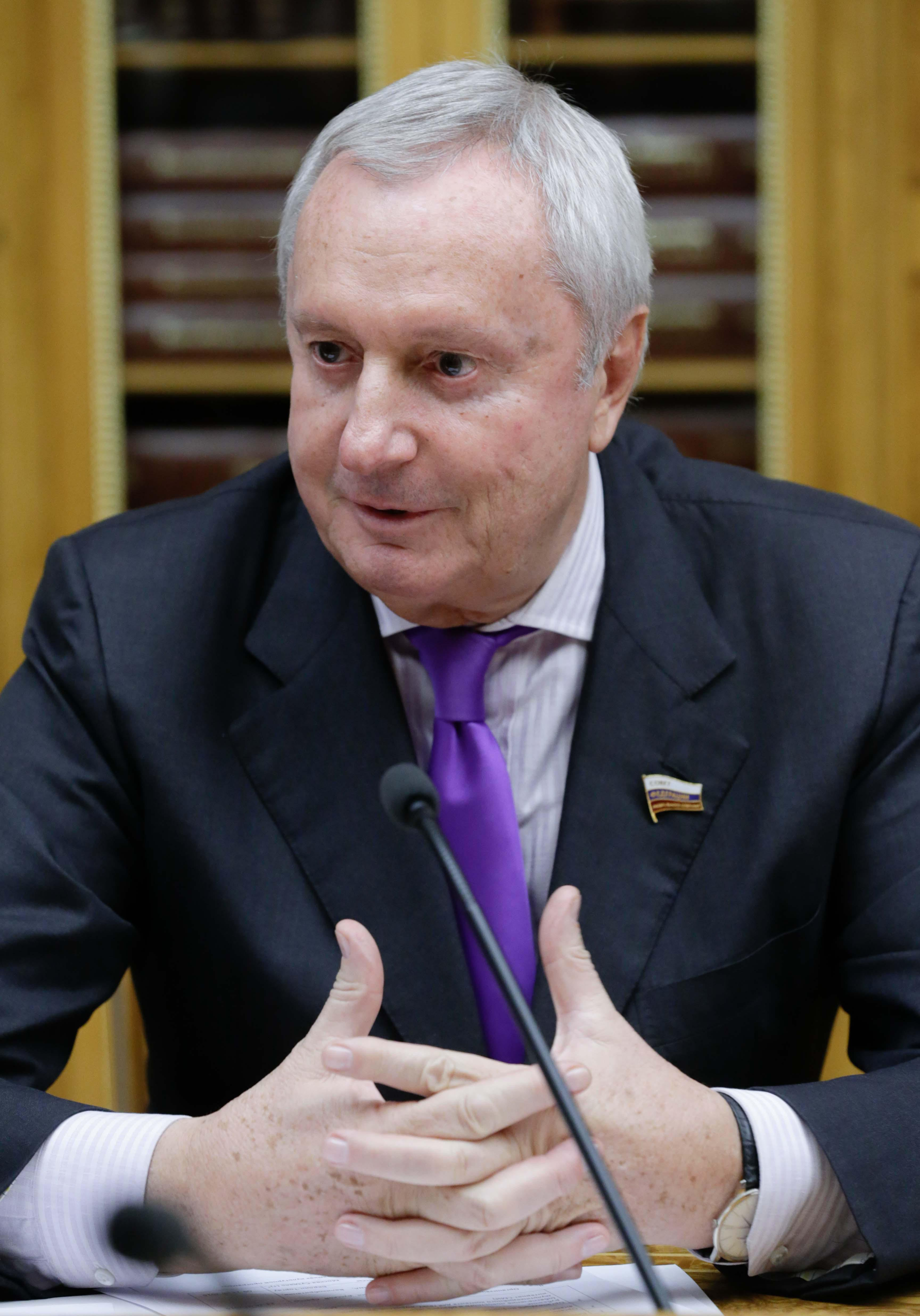
- Ignatenko in 2014

Russian Federation Senator from Krasnodar Krai
- In office 7 November 2012 – 22 September 2015
- Preceded by: Akhmed Bilalov
- Succeeded by: Aleksey Kondratenko

10th General Director of ITAR-TASS
- In office 28 August 1991 – 17 September 2012
- Preceded by: Lev Spiridonov
- Succeeded by: Sergey Mikhailov

Deputy Prime Minister of Russia
- In office 31 May 1995 – 17 March 1997
- President: Boris Yeltsin
- Prime Minister: Viktor Chernomyrdin

Personal details
- Born: 19 April 1941 (age 85) Sochi, Krasnodar Krai, Soviet Union
- Education: Moscow State University
- Occupation: Politician
- Profession: Journalist

Vitaly Nikitich Ignatenko (Russian: Виталий Никитич Игнатенко; born 19 April 1941) is a Russian journalist and politician who had been the head of ITAR-TASS news agency from 1993 until 2012 and had served in the first cabinet of Prime Minister Viktor Chernomyrdin from 1995 to 1997 as deputy prime minister. He has also been a member of different journalism organizations and foundations promoting the Russian language and Russian-speaking press.

== Biography ==
Graduating from Moscow State University with a degree in journalism, he worked for the Komsomolskaya Pravda and Novoye Vremya newspapers in the 1980s. From 1990 to 1991 he served as the press secretary of Soviet President Mikhail Gorbachev.

On June 2, 1995, Ignatenko was appointed Deputy Chairman of Government of the Russian Federation for media affairs. He worked in coordination with fellow deputy chairman Sergei Shakhrai. In 1997, during the Tajikistani Civil War, he was in contact with a local warlord to organize the release of foreign hostages.

In September 2012 Ignatenko was replaced as head of ITAR-TASS news agency.

He is also a UNESCO Goodwill Ambassador and President of the World Association of Russian Press.

== Gallery ==
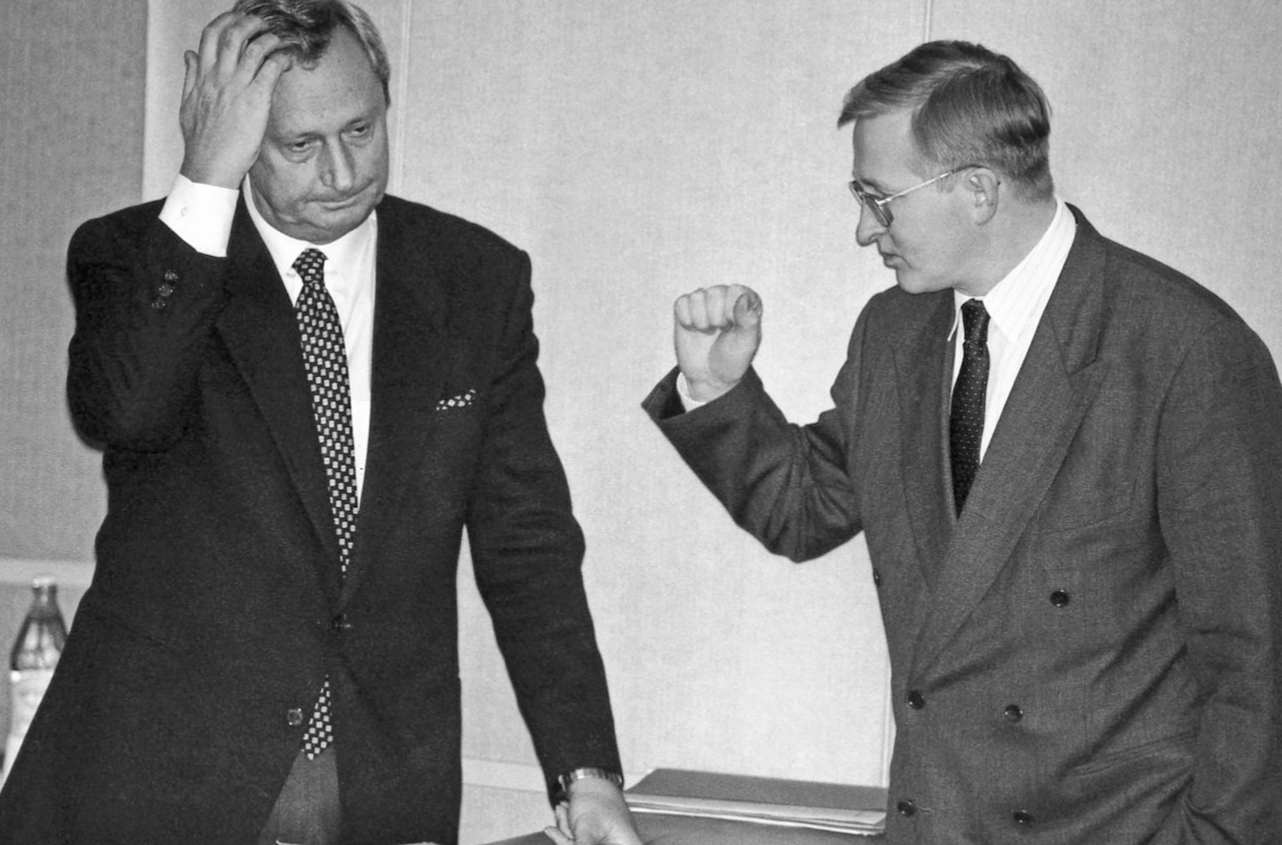
With Alexander Shokhin in State Duma, 10 February 1998

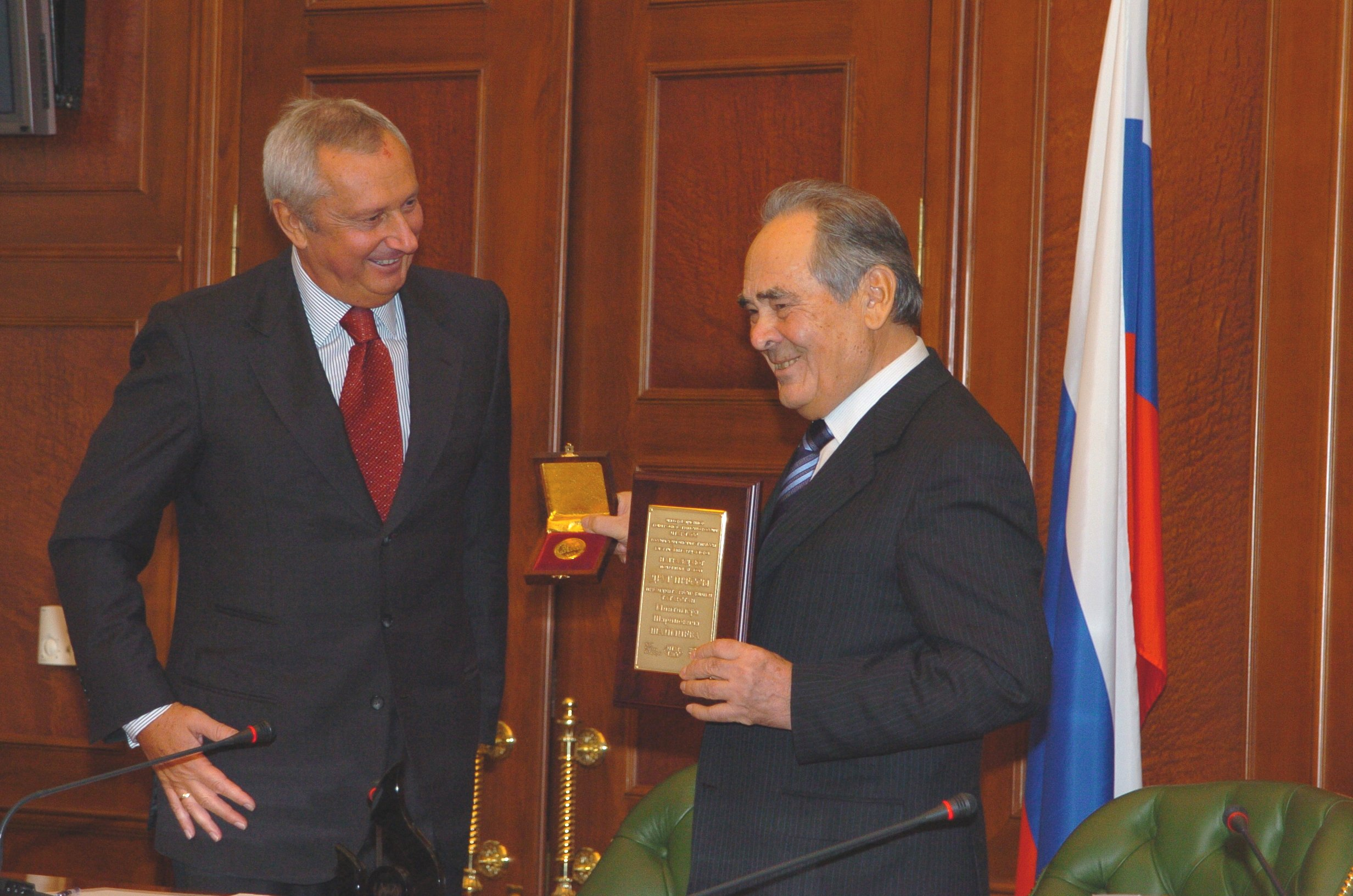
With Mintimer Shaimiev, 18 November 2006

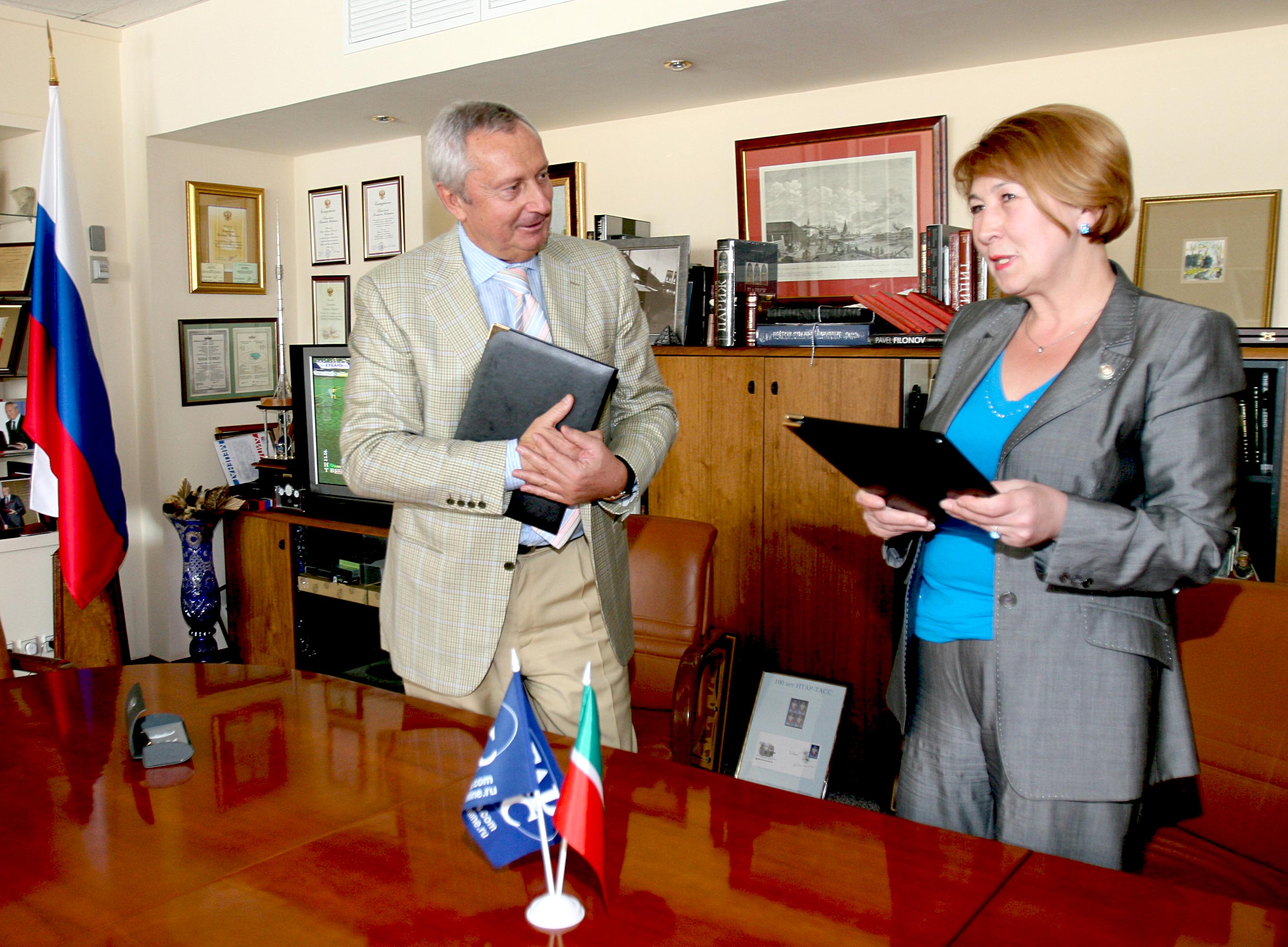
With Zilya Valeeva, 26 June 2007

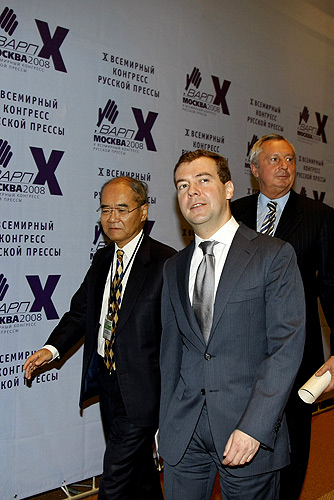
On X World Congress of Russian Press, 11 June 2008

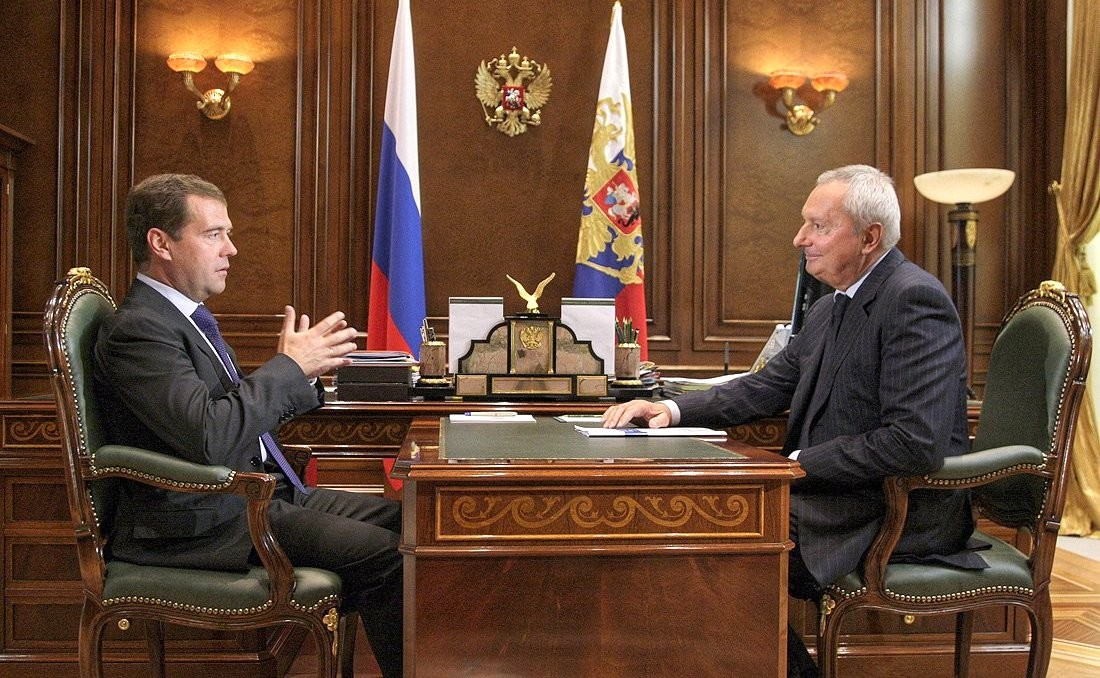
With Dmitry Medvedev on Gorki-9, 2 September 2009

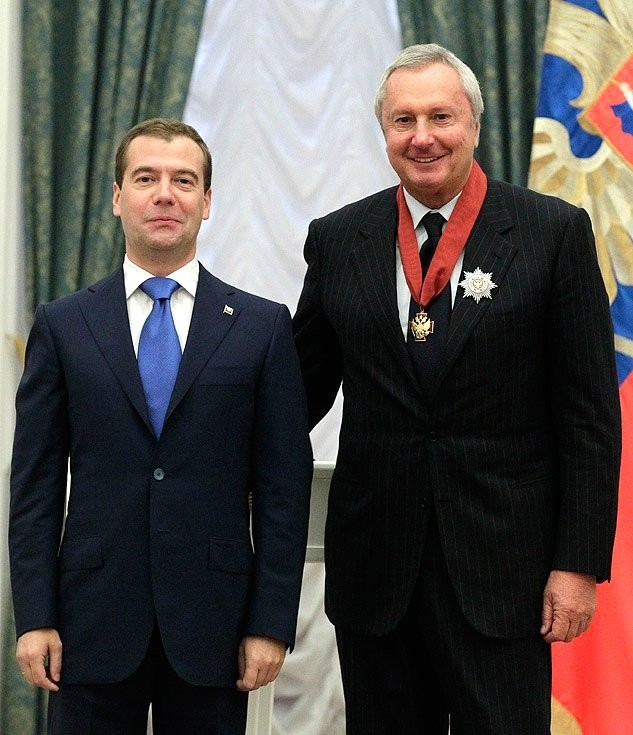
Presentation of the Order "For Merit to the Fatherland", 2nd class, 28 July 2011

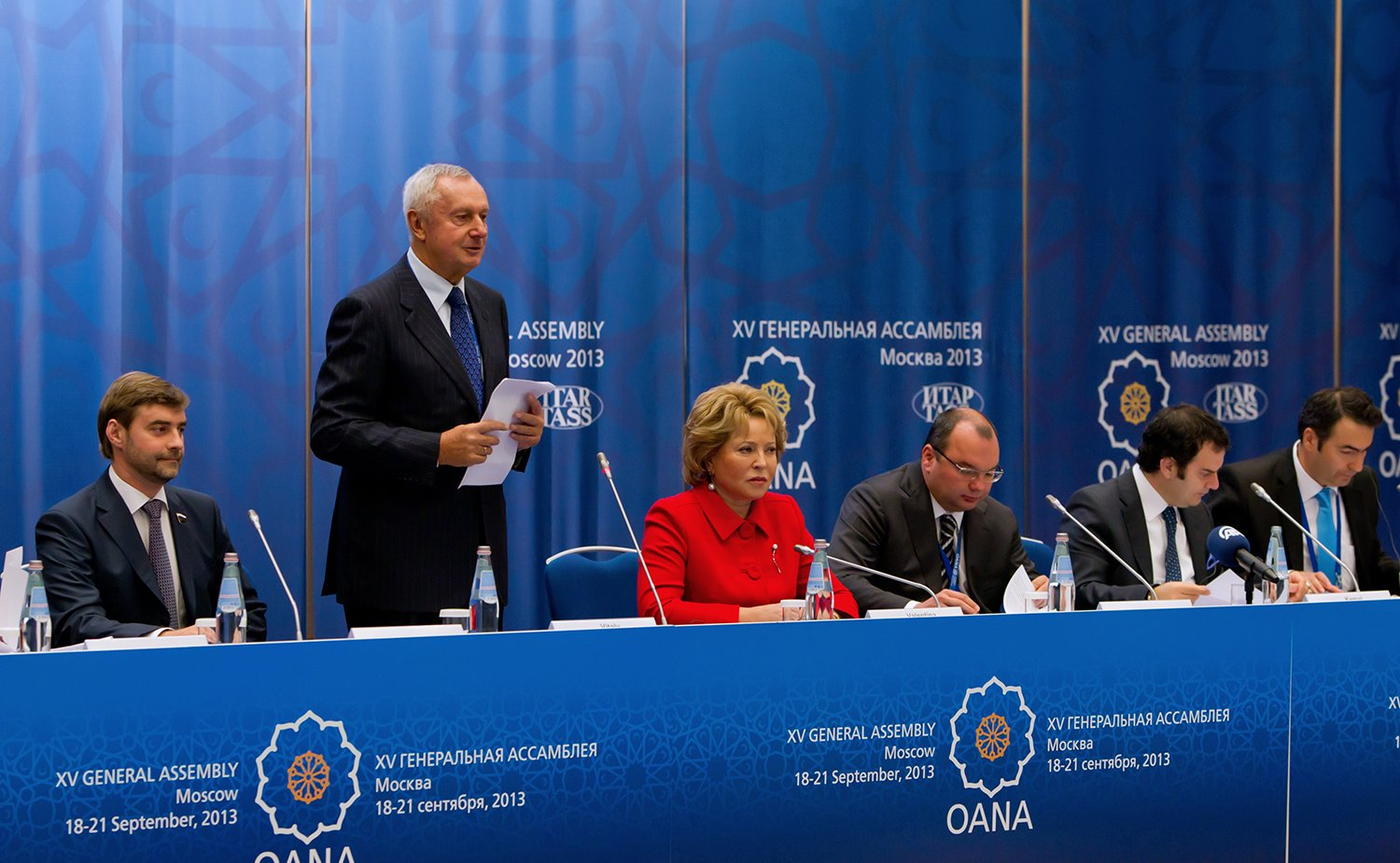

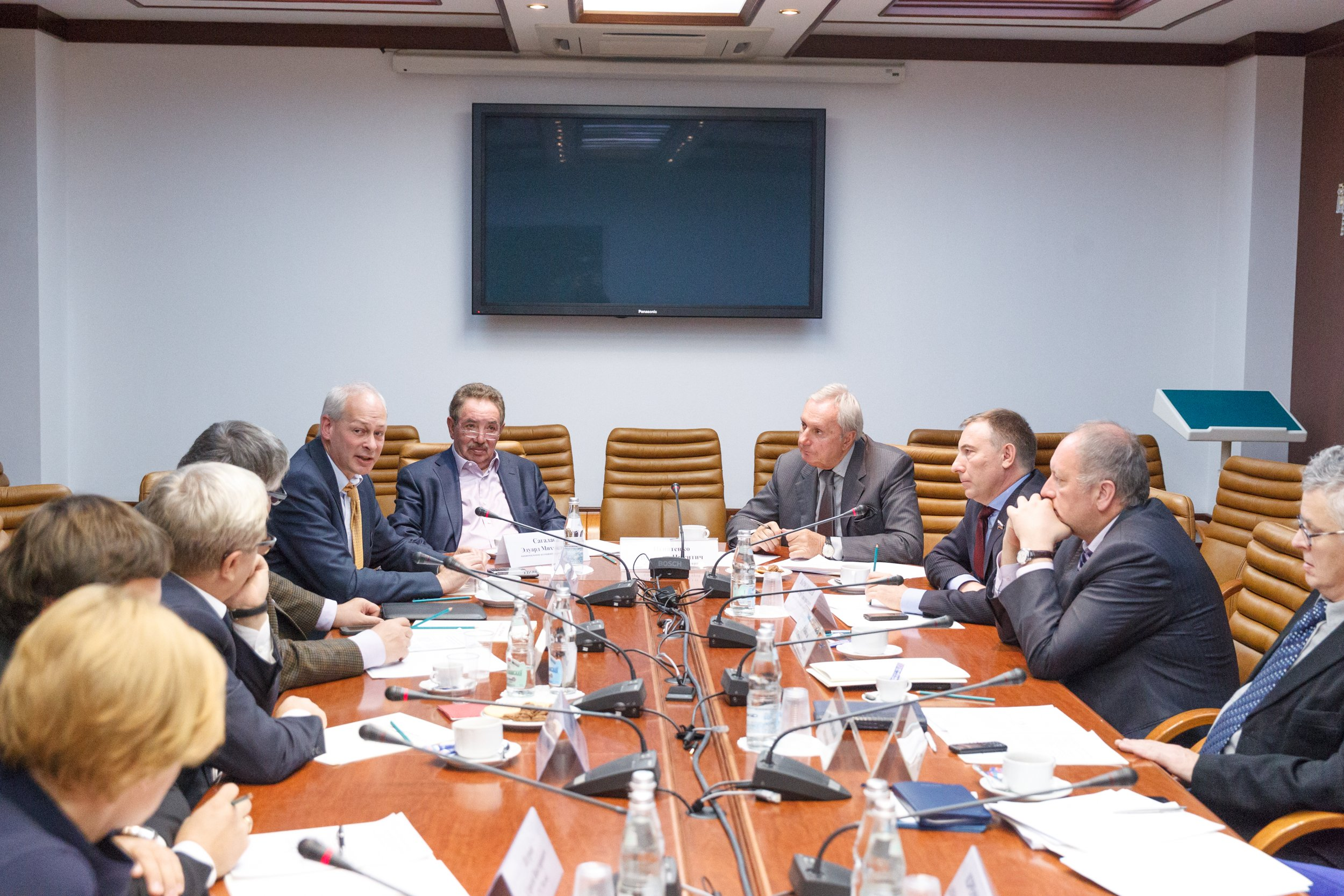

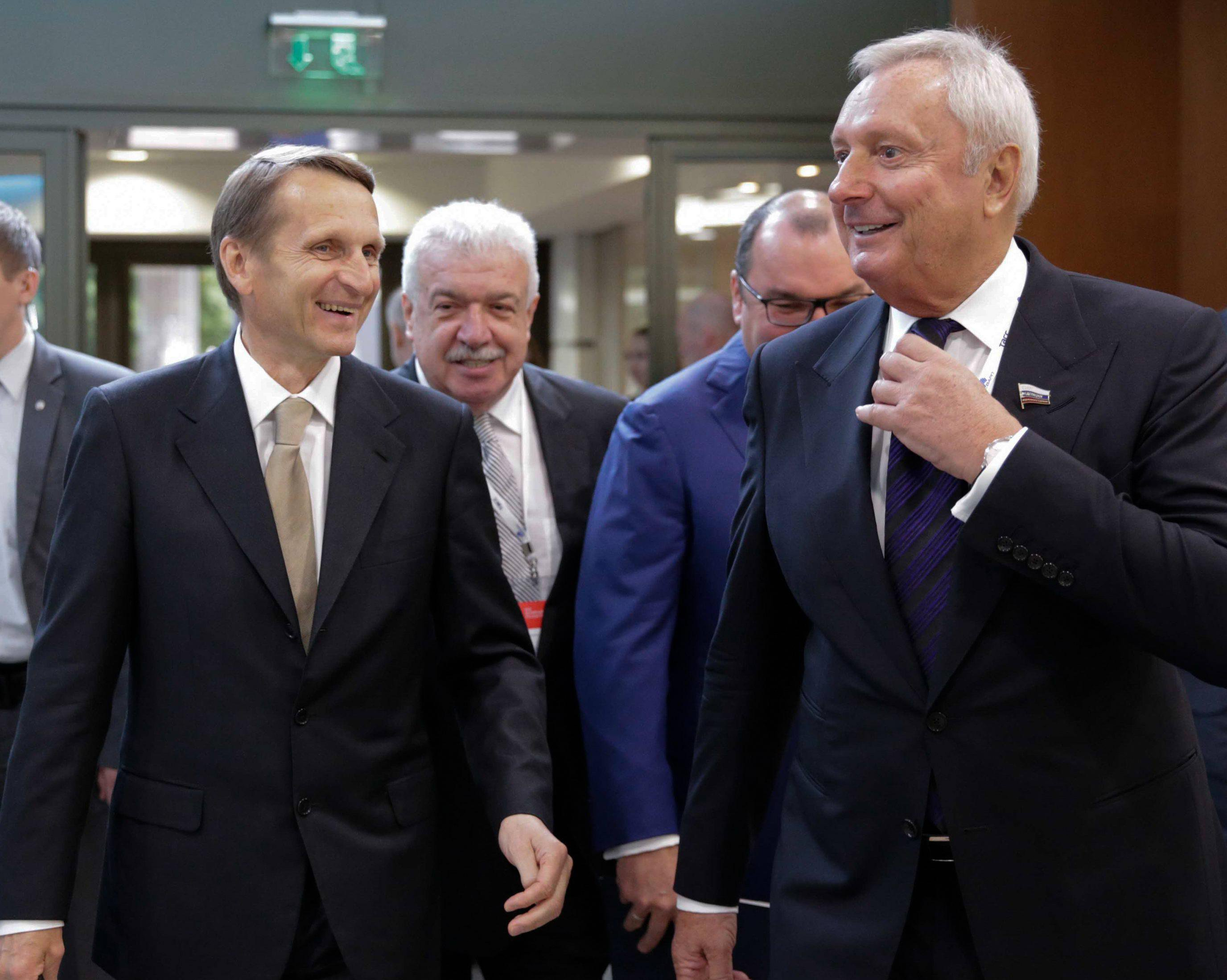

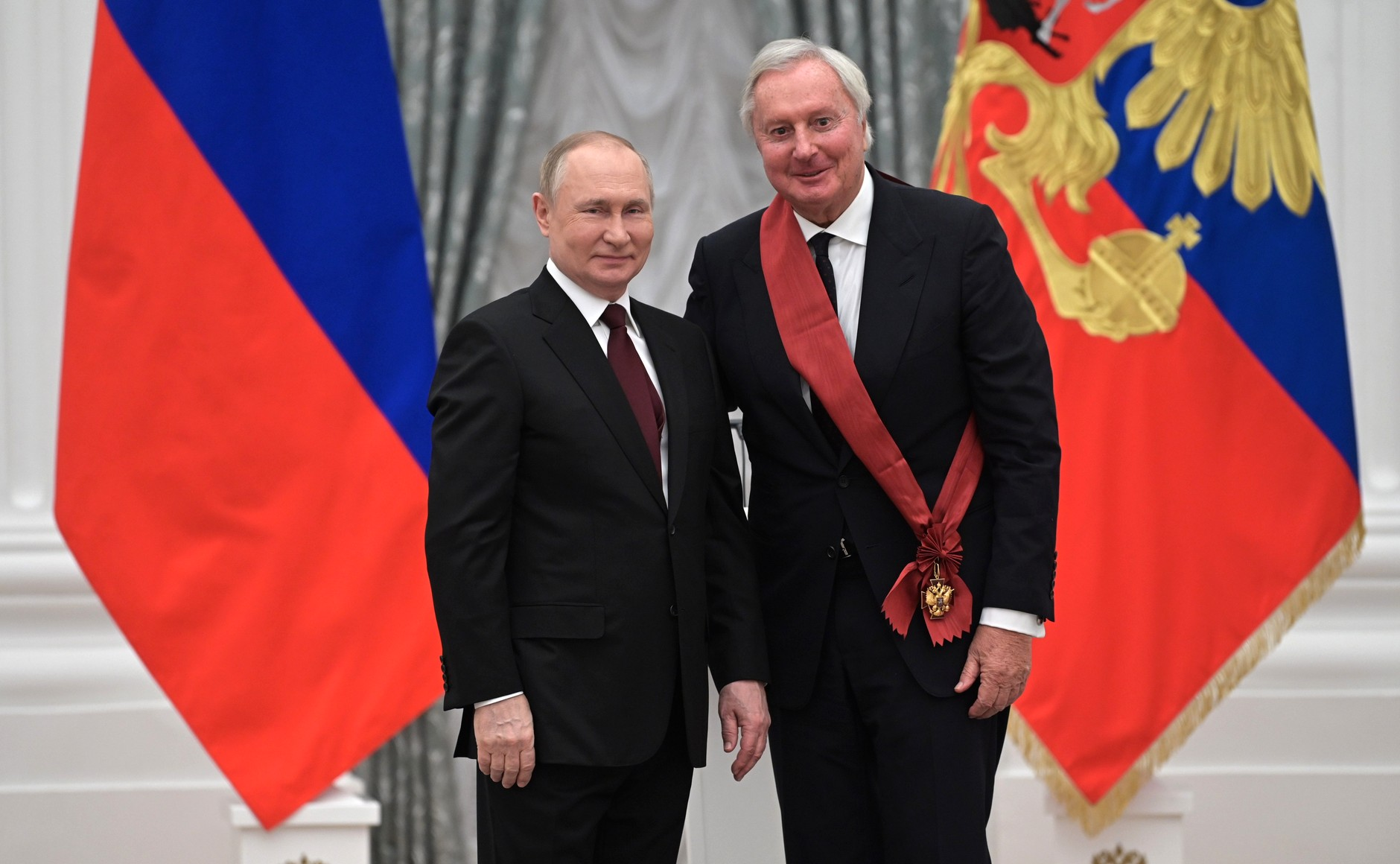
Presentation of the Order "For Merit to the Fatherland", 1st class, 2 February 2022

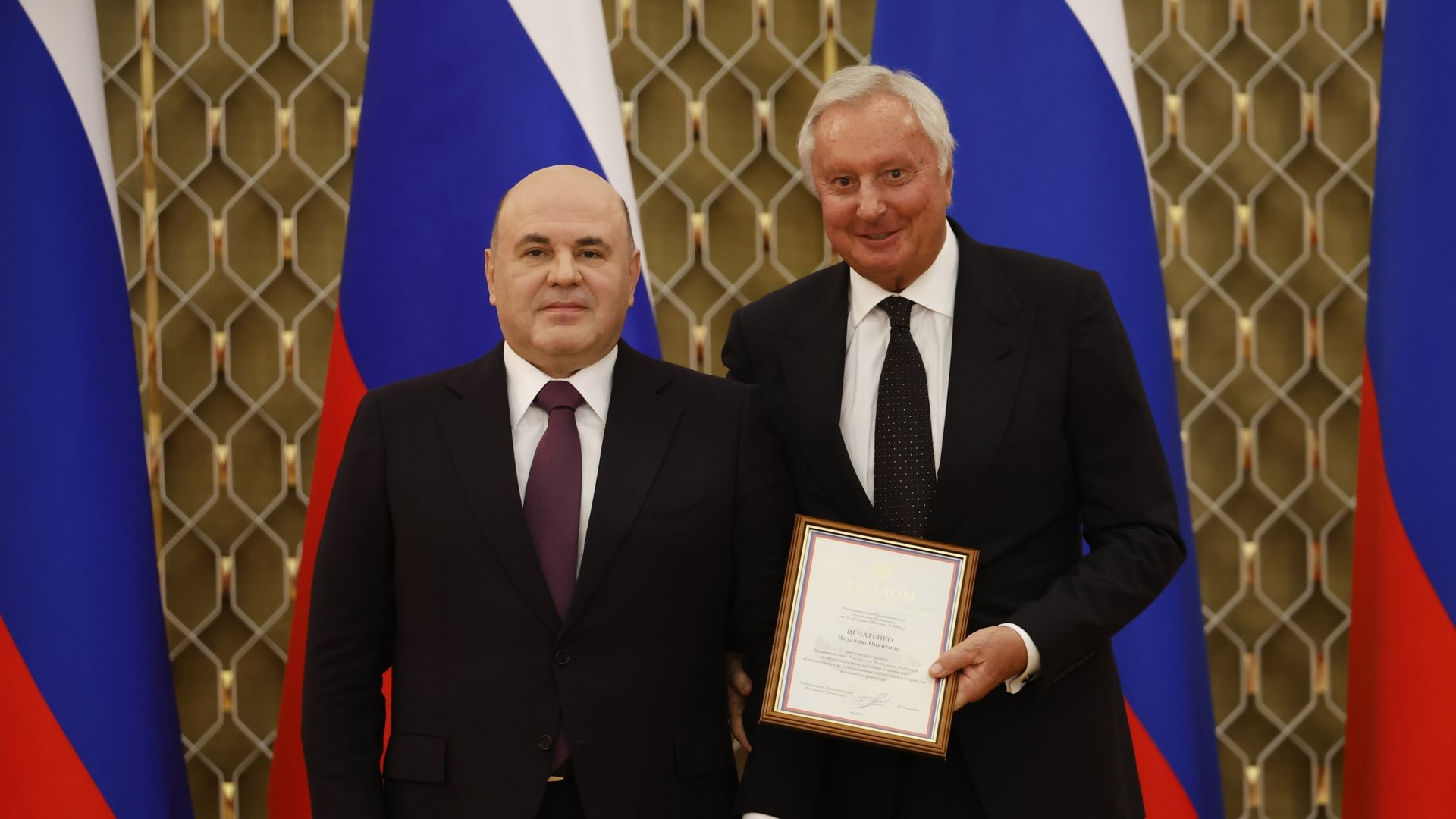
With Mikhail Mishustin, 11 January 2024

== Sources ==
=== Books ===
- Pavel, Palazchenko (2010). My Years with Gorbachev and Shevardnadze: The Memoir of a Soviet Interpreter. Penn State Press. ISBN 978-0271040929.
