= Yevgeny Kharitonov (politician) =

Russian agronomist and politician

- Евгений Харитонов
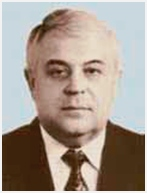

3rd Governor of Krasnodar Krai
- In office 2 August 1994 – 15 July 1996
- Preceded by: Nikolai Yegorov
- Succeeded by: Nikolai Yegorov

Personal details
- Born: 4 October 1946 (age 78) stanitsa Mikhailovskya, Kurganinsky District, Krasnodar Krai, RSFSR, Soviet Union
- Political party: Our Home - Russia

Yevgeny Mikhaylovich Khritonov (Russian: Евгений Михайлович Харитонов, born 4 October 1946) is a Russian agronomist and politician. He has served as governor of Krasnodar Krai in 1994–1996.

In 1971, Kharitonov graduated from the Kuban Agricultural Institute as an agronomist. Since 1973 he was a Communist Party functionary, holding senior positions in Labinsky and Kurganinsky Districts of Krasnodar Krai.

In 1991–94 he was the head of Kurganinsky District administration. From August 1994 to July 1996 Kharitonov was the governor of Krasnodar Krai. After he was removed from office by president Boris Yeltsin, he participated in the election of October 1996. Kharitonov finished fifth with 2% of the vote.

From 1996 to 1998 he was a vice-chancellor of the Kuban State Agrarian University. In 1998-2015 he headed the All-Russian Research Institute of Rice.
