= Vyselki =

Vyselki (Russian: Выселки) is the name of several rural localities in Russia:

- Vyselki, Krasnodar Krai, a stanitsa in Vyselkovsky District of Krasnodar Krai
- Vyselki, Samara Oblast, a selo in Stavropolsky District of Samara Oblast
- Vyselki, name of several other rural localities
- Vyselki, Vladimir Oblast, a village in Vladimir Oblast
