= Andrey Doroshenko =

Russian politician (born 1977)

- Андрей Дорошенко
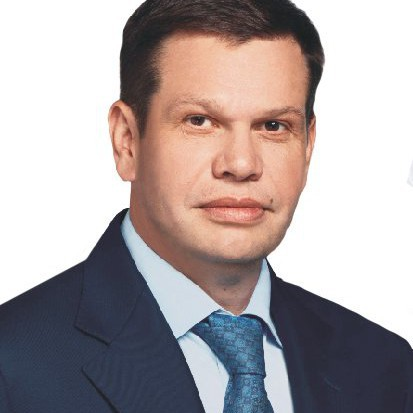
- official portrait, circa 2021

Member of the State Duma for Krasnodar Krai
- Incumbent
- Assumed office 12 October 2021
- Preceded by: Nikolay Kharitonov
- Constituency: Armavir (No. 52)

Personal details
- Born: 10 March 1977 (age 49) Armavir, Krasnodar Krai, Russian SFSR, USSR
- Party: United Russia
- Education: Kuban State Technological University

Andrey Nikolaevich Doroshenko (Russian: Андрей Николаевич Дорошенко; born 10 March 1977, Armavir, Krasnodar Krai) is a Russian political figure and a deputy of the 8th State Duma. From 2010 to 2012, Andrey Doroshenko was a deputy of the Armavir City Duma. From 2012 to 2021, he was a deputy of the Legislative Assembly of Krasnodar Krai of the 5th and 6th convocations.

Since 2021, he has served as a deputy of the 8th State Duma from the Armavir constituency in Krasnodar Krai.

Doroshenko was awarded the medal “For Outstanding Contribution to the Development of the Municipal Formation of the City of Armavir” twice.

== Sanctions ==
For violating the territorial integrity and independence of Ukraine during the Russian–Ukrainian war, he is subject to personal international sanctions imposed by a number of countries, including all member states of the European Union, as well as Canada, Switzerland, Australia, the United Kingdom, the United States, New Zealand, Japan, and Ukraine.
