= Trade Unions and Industrialists – Union of Labour =

Trade Unions and Industrialists – Union of Labour (Russian: Профсоюзы — Промышленники России — Союз труда, Profsoyuzi – Promishlenniki Rossii – Soyuz Truda) was an electoral alliance in Russia.

== History ==
In 1995, the Federation of Independent Trade Unions of Russia (FNPR) and the Russian United Industrial Party (ROPP, a political arm of the Russian Union of Industrialists and Entrepreneurs) formed an electoral bloc aimed at gaining representation in the State Duma. Its declared goal was to protect the interests of both employees and employers in their relations with the government. The federal party list was led by FNPR chairman Mikhail Shmakov and ROPP leaders Vladimir Shcherbakov and Arkady Volsky.

In the 1995 parliamentary elections the bloc received 1.6% of the proportional representation vote, failing to cross the electoral threshold. However, it won a single constituency seat in the State Duma (Armavir).

The bloc did not contest any further elections.

== See also ==
- Civic Union (Russia)
