= Nikolai Kondratenko =

Russian politician (1940–2013)

- Николай Кондратенко
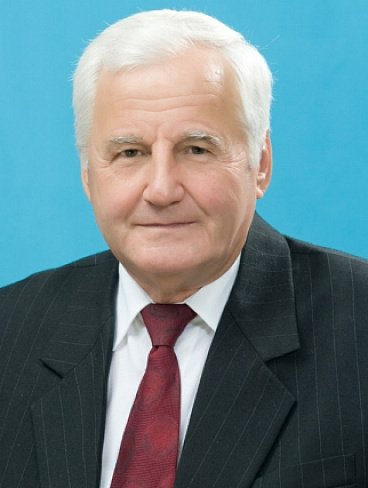

Russian Federation Senator from Krasnodar Krai
- In office 30 January 2008 – 27 November 2013
- Preceded by: Aleksey Shishkov
- Succeeded by: Evgeny Gromyko
- In office 11 January 2001 – 7 December 2003
- Preceded by: Seat established
- Succeeded by: Leonid Mostovoy

5th Governor of Krasnodar Krai
- In office 2 January 1997 – 5 January 2001
- Preceded by: Nikolai Yegorov
- Succeeded by: Alexander Tkachov

Personal details
- Born: Nikolai Ignatovich Kondratenko; 16 February 1940 Plastunovskaya, Dinskoy District, Krasnodar Krai, RSFSR, Soviet Union
- Died: 23 November 2013 (aged 73) Krasnodar, Russia
- Party: Communist Party

Nikolai Ignatovich Kondratenko (Russian: Николай Игнатович Кондратенко; 16 February 1940 – 23 November 2013) was a Russian politician who served as Governor of Krasnodar Krai from 1995 to 2001. He served as a senator from 2001 to 2003 and from 2008 to 2013. He was also the runner-up candidate of the Communist Party in 2003.

== Biography ==
Nikolai Kondratenko was born on 16 February 1940 in the village of Plastunkovskaya in Dinskoy District, Krasnodar Krai. He graduated from the Kuban Agricultural Institute and the Rostov Higher Party School and became a candidate of agricultural sciences.

From 1969, he was involved in party work. From 1984 to 1987, he was the head of the Department of Agriculture, then the Second Secretary of the Krasnodar Krai Committee of the Communist Party of the Soviet Union. From 1987 to 1990, he was Chairman of the Executive Committee of the Krasnodar Krai Soviet of People's Deputies.

In 1989, he was elected to the Congress of People's Deputies of the Soviet Union. In 1990, he was elected a people's deputy and chairman of the Krasnodar Krai Soviet. In August 1991, by decision of the Presidium of the Supreme Soviet of the Russian Soviet Federative Socialist Republic, he was relieved of his position in connection with supporting the August Coup; a criminal case was initiated against him, which was later declared illegal and canceled.

In December 1993, he was elected to the newly established Federation Council, and became a member of the Federation Council Committee on Agriculture and Food Policy. He was one of the organizers of the Kuban Fatherland movement.

In December 1996, he received 82% of the vote and was elected Governor of Krasnodar Krai, serving from 1997 to 2001, a position in which he was preceded by Nikolai Yegorov, and succeeded by Alexander Tkachov.

In 2001, he became the representative to the Federation Council from the administration of Krasnodar Krai. He was a member of the Federation Council Committee on Agriculture and Food Policy. In 2003, he was elected to the State Duma of the 4th convocation. He was a member of the State Duma Committee on Agrarian Issues.

Kondratenko was criticized for public antisemitic statements in 2003.

In 2008, he was again elected to the Federation Council.

He was known for his promotion of traditional values and a Cossack cultural revival.

He died on 23 November 2013.

== Personal life ==
His son Aleksey Kondratenko is also a politician, and has been a senator from Krasnodar Krai since 22 September 2015.

Preceded by Nikolai Yegorov	Governor of Krasnodar Krai; 2 January 1997 – 5 January 2001	Succeeded by Aleksandr Tkachyov
