= Aleksey Kondratenko =

Russian politician (born 1969)

- Алексей Кондратенко
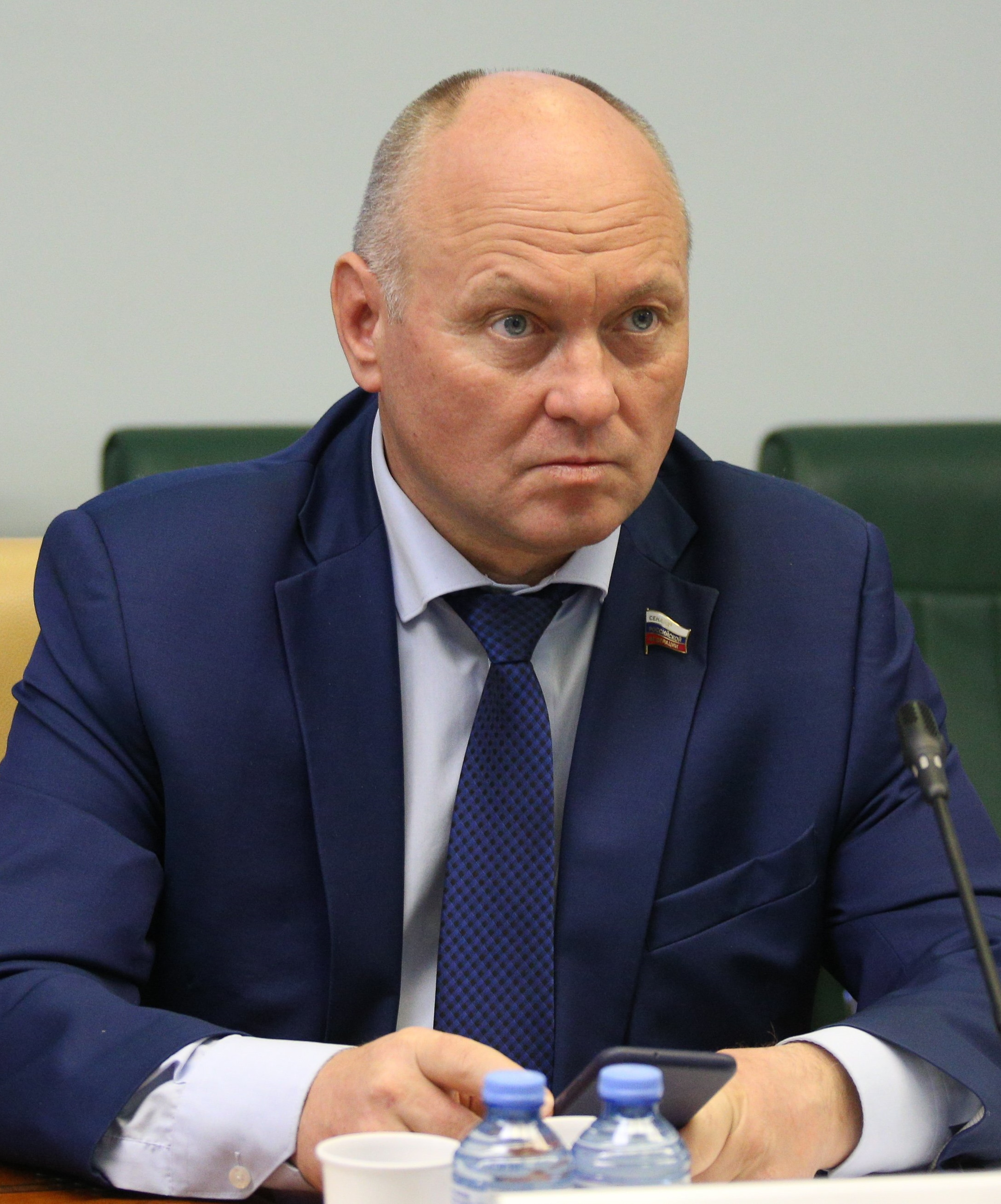

Senator from Krasnodar Krai
- Incumbent
- Assumed office 22 September 2015
- Preceded by: Vitaly Ignatenko

Personal details
- Born: Aleksey Kondratenko; 16 December 1969 (age 56) Dinskoy District, Krasnodar Krai, Soviet Union
- Party: United Russia
- Education: Kuban State Agrarian University

Aleksey Nikolayevich Kondratenko (Russian: Алексей Николаевич Кондратенко; born 16 December 1969) is a Russian politician serving as a senator from Krasnodar Krai since 22 September 2015.

== Career ==
Aleksey Kondratenko was born on 16 December 1969 in Dinskoy District, Krasnodar Krai, in the family of the future governor of Krasnodar Krai Nikolai Kondratenko, who served from 1997 to 2001. In 1993, he graduated from Kuban State Agrarian University. After graduation, he engaged with private enterprise. Until 2004, he was the Director General of Kuban Telesystems LLC. On 2 December 2007 and 14 October 2012 he was elected deputy of the Legislative Assembly of Krasnodar Krai of the 4th and 5th convocations, consequently. On 22 September 2015, he was appointed a senator from Krasnodar Krai.

=== Sanctions ===
Aleksey Kondratenko is under personal sanctions introduced by the European Union, the United Kingdom, the USA, Canada, Switzerland, Australia, Ukraine, New Zealand, for ratifying the decisions of the "Treaty of Friendship, Cooperation and Mutual Assistance between the Russian Federation and the Donetsk People's Republic and between the Russian Federation and the Luhansk People's Republic" and providing political and economic support for Russia's annexation of Ukrainian territories.
