= Ust-Labinsky =

Ust-Labinsky (masculine), Ust-Labinskaya (feminine), or Ust-Labinskoye (neuter) may refer to:

- Ust-Labinsky District, a district of Krasnodar Krai, Russia
- Ust-Labinskoye Urban Settlement, a municipal formation in Ust-Labinsky Municipal District of Krasnodar Krai, Russia
- Ust-Labinskaya, name of the town of Ust-Labinsk, Krasnodar Krai, Russia, between 1794 and 1958
