= Nikolai Yegorov =

- Николай Егоров
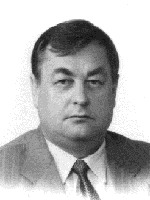

4th Governor of Krasnodar Krai
- In office 15 July 1996 – 2 January 1997
- Preceded by: Yevgeny Kharitonov
- Succeeded by: Nikolai Kondratenko

3rd Kremlin Chief of Staff
- In office 15 January 1996 – 15 July 1996
- Preceded by: Sergey Filatov
- Succeeded by: Anatoly Chubais

2nd Governor of Krasnodar Krai
- In office 23 December 1992 – 2 August 1994
- Preceded by: Vasily Dyakonov
- Succeeded by: Yevgeny Kharitonov

Personal details
- Born: Nikolay Dmitriyevich Yegorov; 3 May 1951; Zassovskaya, Krasnodar Krai, Russian SFSR, Soviet Union
- Died: 25 April 1997 (aged 45); Moscow, Russia
- Political party: Independent

Nikolay Dmitriyevich Yegorov (Russian: Николай Дмитриевич Егоров; 3 May 1951 – 25 April 1997) was a Russian politician. He was the Governor of Krasnodar Kray in 1992-1994 and in 1996–1997, Minister for the Ethnic Affairs of the Russian Federation in 1994–1995 and the representative of the President of Russian Federation in Chechnya, the chief of the Russian presidential administration, 1995–1996. He had the federal state civilian service rank of 1st class Active State Councillor of the Russian Federation.

Yegorov also played an important role in the leadership of Yeltsin's reelection campaign.

== Biography ==
Yegorov graduated from the Stavropol State Agrarian University, Higher Party School under the Central Committee of the CPSU. He worked as an instructor of the district party committee, secretary of the state farm party committee, chairman of the collective farm, chairman of the Labinsky District executive committee. In 1990–1993 - First Deputy Chairman of the Krasnodar Krai Agro-Industrial Union, General Director of the Department of Agriculture and Food, First Deputy Head of the Krai Administration of Krasnodar, Chairman of the Krai Government.

On December 23, 1992 was appointed governor of the Krasnodar Krai.

Preceded by Sergey Filatov	Chief of the Russian presidential administration 15 January 1995 – July 15, 1996	Succeeded by Anatoly Chubais
Preceded by Vasiliy Dyakonov	Governor of Krasnodar Krai; 23 December 1992 – 2 August 1994	Succeeded by Yevgeny Kharitonov
Preceded by Yevgeny Kharitonov	Governor of Krasnodar Krai; 15 July 1996 – 2 January 1997	Succeeded by Nikolai Kondratenko
