= Vyselki, Vladimir Oblast =

Vyselki Выселки
- Village
- Location within Vladimir Oblast Location within Russia
- Coordinates: 56°14′N 40°38′E
- Country: Russia
- Region: Vladimir Oblast
- District: Suzdalsky District
- Time zone: UTC+3:00

Vyselki (Russian: Выселки) is a rural locality (a village) in Bogolyubovskoye Rural Settlement, Suzdalsky District, Vladimir Oblast, Russia. The population was 26 as of 2010. There are 2 streets.

== Geography ==
Vyselki is located 45 km southeast of Suzdal (the district's administrative centre) by road. Dorzhevo is the nearest rural locality.
