= Vasily Dyakonov =

Russian politician (1946–2012)

- Василий Дьяконов

1st Governor of Krasnodar Krai
- In office 24 August 1991 – 9 December 1992
- Succeeded by: Nikolai Yegorov

Personal details
- Born: 25 June 1946 Platnirovskaya, Korenovsky District, Krasnodar Krai, RSFSR, Soviet Union
- Died: 5 September 2012 (aged 66) Moscow, Russia
- Party: Independent
- Children: 1 son 1 daughter

Vasily Nikolayevich Dyakonov (Russian: Васи́лий Никола́евич Дья́конов; July 25, 1946 – September 5, 2012) was a Governor of Krasnodar Krai who held this post in 1991–1992. He was succeeded by Nikolai Yegorov.

Preceded by Position created	Governor of Krasnodar Krai; August 24, 1991 – December 23, 1992	Succeeded by Nikolai Yegorov
