= Alexander Tkachov (politician) =

Russian politician

- Александр Ткачёв
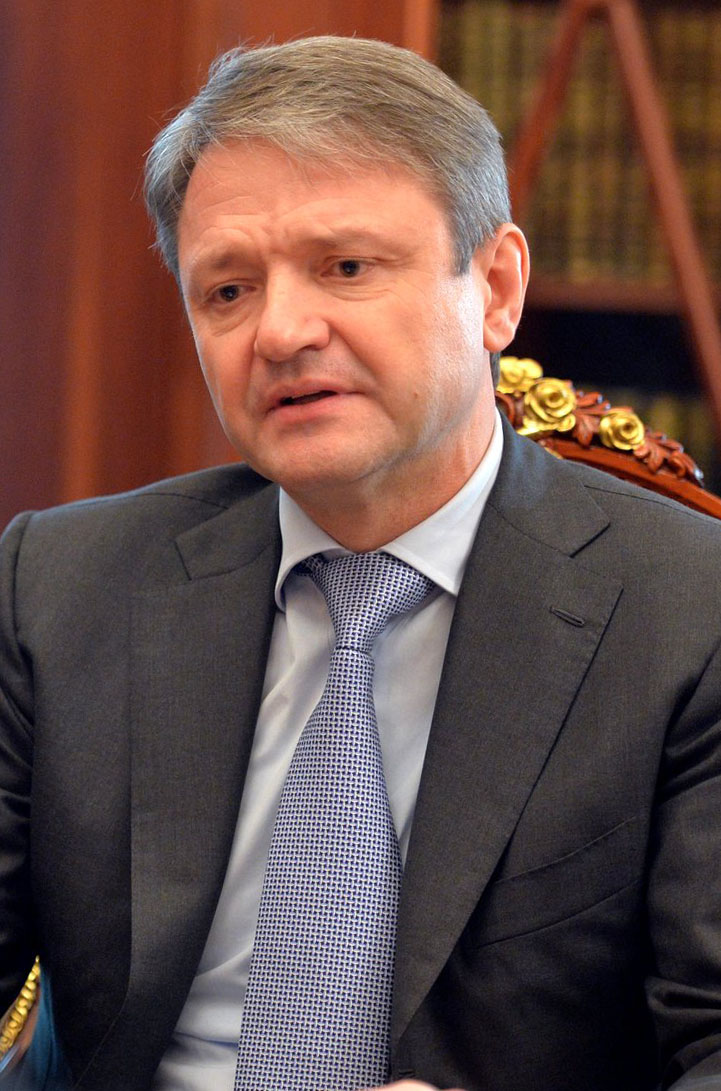
- Tkachov in 2015

Minister of Agriculture
- In office 22 April 2015 – 7 May 2018
- President: Vladimir Putin
- Prime Minister: Dmitry Medvedev
- Preceded by: Nikolay Fyodorov
- Succeeded by: Dmitry Patrushev

6th Governor of Krasnodar Krai
- In office 5 January 2001 – 22 April 2015
- Preceded by: Nikolai Kondratenko
- Succeeded by: Veniamin Kondratyev

Deputy of the State Duma from Krasnodar Krai
- In office 17 December 1995 – 5 January 2001
- Constituency: Tikhoretsk

Personal details
- Born: 23 December 1960 (age 65) Vyselki, Krasnodar Krai, Russian SFSR, Soviet Union
- Party: United Russia
- Other political affiliations: Communist Party of the Russian Federation
- Spouse: Olga Tkachyova
- Children: 2
- Education: Krasnodar Polytechnic Institute; Kuban State Agrarian University
- Profession: Mechanical engineer

Alexander Nikolayevich Tkachov (Russian: Александр Николаевич Ткачёв; born 23 December 1960) is businessman of the agribusiness group Tkachev Agrocomplex. He was a Russian politician who has served as Minister of Agriculture of Russia in Dmitry Medvedev's Cabinet from April 2015 to May 2018. Previously he was Governor of Krasnodar Krai in the southern European part of Russia from 2001 to 2015.

== Biography ==
Tkachov was born in 1960 in Vyselki, Krasnodar Krai. He was elected to Krasnodar Krai's legislative assembly in 1994. Subsequently, he was elected to the State Duma of Russia in 1995 and re-elected in 1999. He was elected as Governor of Krasnodar Krai on 3 December 2000, and was re-elected on 14 March 2004. He is a graduate of the Krasnodar Polytechnic Institute. In 2014, the Financial Times described him as one of Vladimir Putin's "most loyal lieutenants".

Tkachyov has been an advocate for building a dam across the Kerch Strait, between Krasnodar Krai and Ukraine. Tkachyov is also known for his strong stand against illegal immigration in Russia. Some commentators interpret his remarks as racist, particularly against the Meskhetian Turks.

Tkachyov has vowed to drive "the aliens and dissenters" out of his region.

In 2008, he made headlines when he expressed his frustration about the progress of the construction projects for the 2014 Sochi Olympics. Arguing that construction bosses and local politicians were "careless" and "indifferent" about the task ahead, he warned that the successful Olympics bid may be transferred to another part of Russia if no significant changes were made, which would result in the region forgoing a large economic opportunity.

On 2 August 2012, Tkachyov announced plans to deploy a paramilitary force of Cossacks in Krasnodar Krai beginning in September 2012 as vigilantes to discourage internal immigration by Muslim Russians. In a speech to police he stated, "What you can't do, the Cossacks can. We have no other way — we shall stamp it out, instill order; we shall demand paperwork and enforce migration policies."

On 22 April 2015, Vladimir Putin named him as the Minister of Agriculture in Dmitry Medvedev's Cabinet, replacing Nikolay Fyodorov, who was promoted to work in the Administration of the President of the Russian Federation.

During a cabinet meeting in October 2017, Russian President Vladimir Putin was amused by Minister Tkachov's proposal to export pork to Indonesia, a country with a predominantly Muslim population whose Islamic dietary laws prohibit the consumption of pork. When Putin remarked, "Indonesia is a Muslim country. They don't eat pork there," Tkachov replied, "Very well," before saying he meant South Korea, briefly continuing his speech and adding, "What's the difference?" Putin then chuckled and covered his face. Regardless, Russia does export pork to Indonesia, catering in particular to the nearly 36 million non-Muslim Indonesians who made up nearly 13% of the population as of 2024. In 2017, Indonesia imported more than one million tons of pork.

=== Sanctions ===
On July 26, 2014, the European Union, Albania, Iceland, Liechtenstein, Moldova, Montenegro, Norway, and Ukraine added Tkachev to their sanctions lists.

He was sanctioned by the UK government in 2014 in relation to the Russo-Ukrainian War.

== Awards and honours ==
In 2014, Tkachov was awarded the Paralympic Order.

== Photos ==
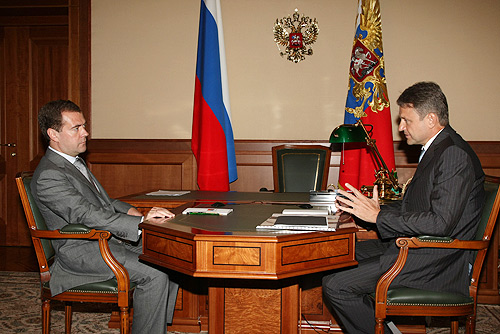
Tkachyov at a meeting with then-President Dmitry Medvedev, 2008

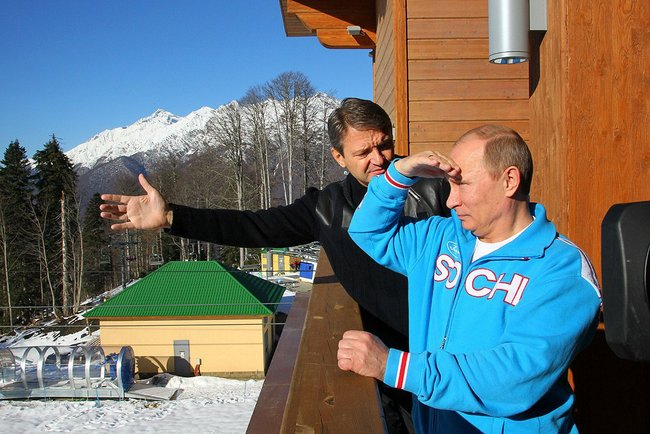
Vladimir Putin with Tkachyov at the ski resort Krasnaya Polyana, Sochi, Krasnodar Krai, 3 January 2013

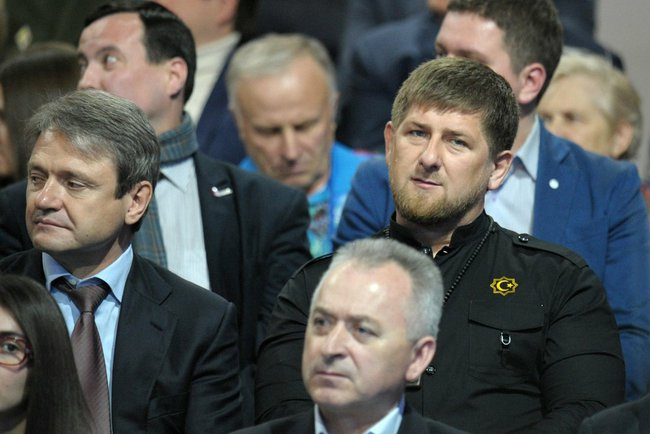
Tkachyov and Ramzan Kadyrov

Political offices
Preceded by Nikolay Fyodorov	Minister of Agriculture; 22 April 2015 – 7 May 2018	Succeeded by Dmitry Patrushev
Preceded by Nikolai Kondratenko	Governor of Krasnodar Krai; 5 January 2001 – 22 April 2015	Succeeded by Veniamin Kondratev
