= Novokubansky District =

Novokubansky District Новокубанский район (Russian)
- District
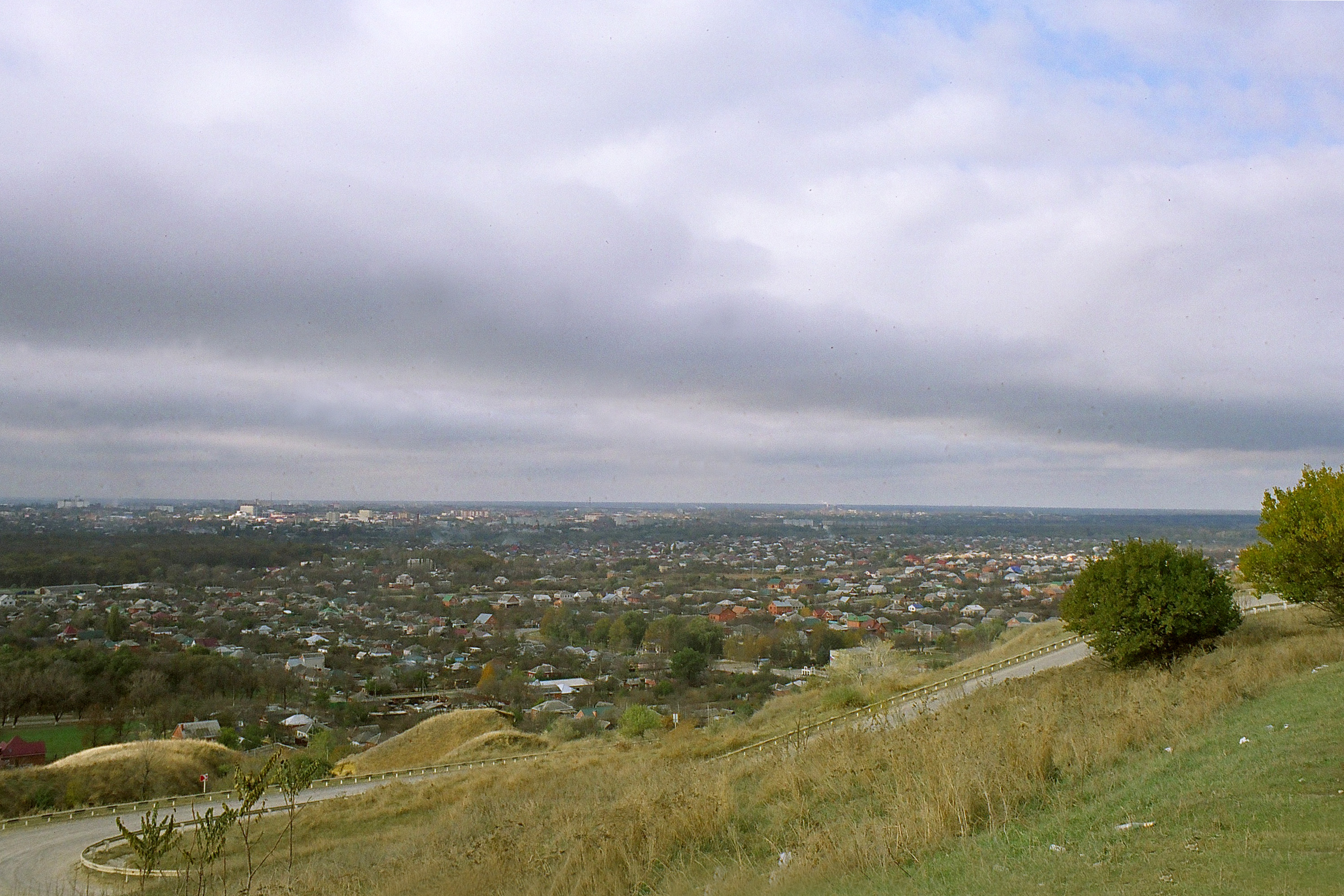
- View of Armavir, in Novokubansky District

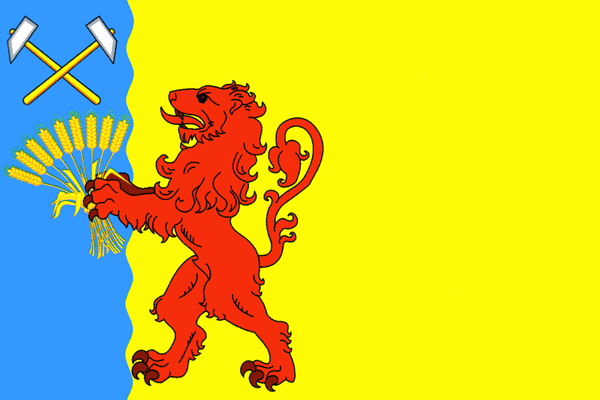
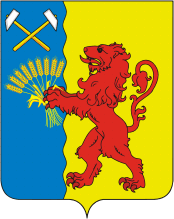
- Flag Coat of arms
- Location of Novokubansky District in Krasnodar Krai
- Coordinates: 45°06′11″N 41°02′52″E
- Country: Russia
- Federal subject: Krasnodar Krai
- Established: 1936
- Administrative center: Novokubansk

Area
  - Total: 1,823 km^{2} (704 sq mi)

Population (2010 Census)
  - Total: 86,311
  - Density: 47.35/km^{2} (122.6/sq mi)
  - Urban: 40.4%
  - Rural: 59.6%

Administrative structure
  - Administrative divisions: 1 Towns, 8 Rural okrugs
  - Inhabited localities: 1 cities/towns, 52 rural localities

Municipal structure
  - Municipally incorporated as: Novokubansky Municipal District
  - Municipal divisions: 1 urban settlements, 8 rural settlements
- Time zone: UTC+3 (MSK)
- OKTMO ID: 03634000
- Website: novokubanskiy.ru

Novokubansky District (Russian: Новокуба́нский райо́н) is an administrative district (raion), one of the thirty-eight in Krasnodar Krai, Russia. As a municipal division, it is incorporated as Novokubansky Municipal District. It is located in the east of the krai. The area of the district is 1,823 square kilometers (704 sq mi). Its administrative center is the town of Novokubansk. Population: 86,311 (2010 census); 87,478 (2002 census); 76,275 (1989 Soviet census). The population of Novokubansk accounts for 40.4% of the district's total population.

== Geography ==
The Kuban River flows through the district.

=== Climate ===
The district is vulnerable to extended drought conditions. Average annual precipitation is 551 millimeters (21.7 in).

== Economy ==
The district has very fertile soil, so the agriculture and food industry are developed. Farmlands cover 1,370 square kilometers (530 sq mi), or 75% of the district's territory.

=== Transportation ===
Major federal roads and railway pass through the district, playing a substantial role in its economy and life of local communities.
