= Novokubansk =

Town in Krasnodar Krai, Russia

Novokubansk Новокубанск
- Town
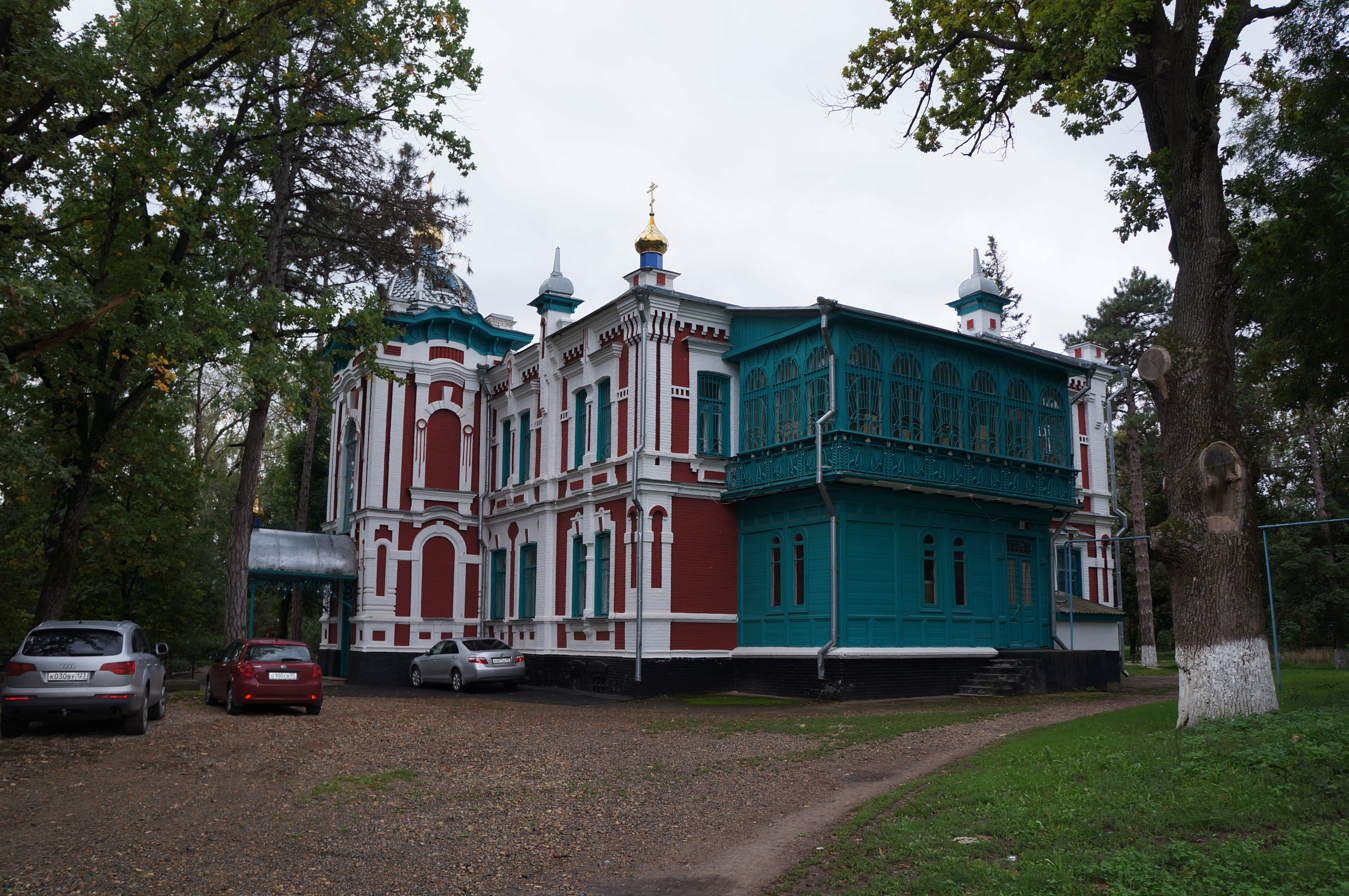

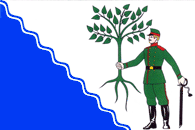
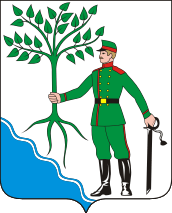
- Flag Coat of arms
- Interactive map of Novokubansk
- Location of Novokubansk Novokubansk (European Russia) Novokubansk (Russia)
- Coordinates: 45°06′N 41°02′E
- Country: Russia
- Federal subject: Krasnodar Krai
- Administrative district: Novokubansky District
- TownSelsoviet: Novokubansk
- Founded: 1867
- Town status since: 1966
- Elevation: 145 m (476 ft)

Population (2010 Census)
  - Total: 34,880
  - Estimate (2025): 33,048 (−5.3%)

Administrative status
  - Capital of: Novokubansky District, Town of Novokubansk

Municipal status
  - Municipal district: Novokubansky Municipal District
  - Urban settlement: Novokubanskoye Urban Settlement
  - Capital of: Novokubansky Municipal District, Novokubanskoye Urban Settlement
- Time zone: UTC+3 (MSK)
- Postal code: 352240 — 352244
- Dialing code: +7 86195
- OKTMO ID: 03634101001

Novokubansk (Russian: Новокуба́нск, until 1966 Novokubanskoye, Russian: Новокубанское; Ukrainian: Новокубанське, romanized: Novokubanske) is a town and the administrative center of Novokubansky District of Krasnodar Krai, Russia, located on the Kuban River. Population: 35,199 (2020), 34,880 (2010 census); 35,400 (2002 census); 30,201 (1989 Soviet census). The population of Novokubansk accounts for 40.4% of the district's total population.

== History ==
When the Caucasian War ended, in 1867, former soldiers decided to settle in a place which is now known as Novokubansk. According to the 1926 census, Novokubanskoye had a population of 12,303, 54.0% Russian and 43.8% Ukrainian. In 1936, Novokubanskoye became the administrative center of Novokubansky District. During World War II, the settlement was occupied by the German troops from August 6, 1942 to January 25, 1943. Six soldiers were killed and sixteen were wounded during the last battle. Rapidly growing Novokubanskoye was granted town status and renamed Novokubansk in 1966.

== Administrative and municipal status ==
Within the framework of administrative divisions, Novokubansk serves as the administrative center of Novokubansky District. As an administrative division, it is incorporated within Novokubansky District as the Town of Novokubansk. As a municipal division, the Town of Novokubansk is incorporated within Novokubansky Municipal District as Novokubanskoye Urban Settlement.

== Economy ==
Major federal roads and railway pass near Novokubansk. The town is very developed and it is the center of local food processing industry and agriculture. Surrounding Novokubansk are a number of orchards and wineries. A local brandy Big Prize is a famous product of one of the biggest wineries in the town. A large sugarcane production plant is situated at outskirts of Novokubansk. Also, one of the largest local experimental-industrial farms is headquartered in Novokubansk.
