= Labinsk =

Town in Krasnodar Krai, Russia

Labinsk Лабинск
- Town
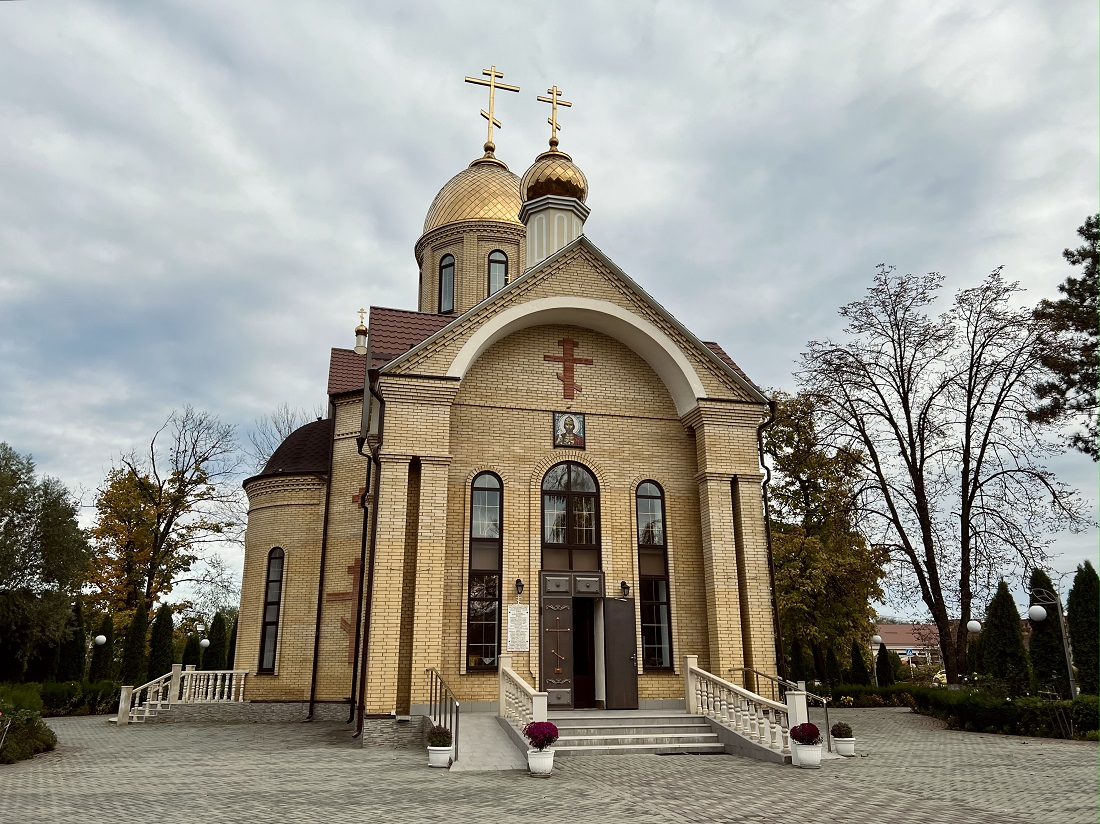
- Orthodox church in Labinsk

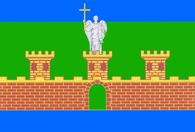
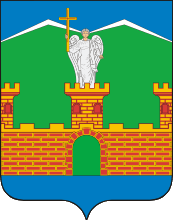
- Flag Coat of arms
- Interactive map of Labinsk
- Location of Labinsk Labinsk (European Russia) Labinsk (Russia)
- Coordinates: 44°38′N 40°44′E
- Country: Russia
- Federal subject: Krasnodar Krai
- Founded: 1841
- Town status since: 1947
- Elevation: 270 m (890 ft)

Population (2010 Census)
  - Total: 62,864
  - Estimate (2025): 55,434 (−11.8%)
  - Rank: 252nd in 2010

Administrative status
  - Subordinated to: Town of Labinsk
  - Capital of: Town of Labinsk, Labinsky District

Municipal status
  - Municipal district: Labinsky Municipal District
  - Urban settlement: Labinskoye Urban Settlement
  - Capital of: Labinsky Municipal District, Labinskoye Urban Settlement
- Time zone: UTC+3 (MSK)
- Postal code: 352500–352508
- OKTMO ID: 03630101001

Labinsk (Russian: Лаби́нск; Adyghe: Чэтыун, ‌Čʼătəun; Ukrainian: Лабінськ) is a town in Krasnodar Krai, Russia, located on the Bolshaya Laba River (a tributary of the Kuban) 145 kilometers (90 mi) southeast of Krasnodar and 50 kilometers (31 mi) southwest of Armavir. Population: 57,428 (2021), 59,330 (2020), 62,864 (2010 census); 61,446 (2002 census); 57,958 (1989 Soviet census); 53,000 (1972); 28,831 (1926).

== History ==
The stanitsa of Labinskaya was founded in autumn of 1841. It was named after the Bolshaya Laba River on which it stands. Its history is closely connected with the history of the Caucasian War and establishment of a special strategic defense line on the Bolshaya Laba River. The stanitsa was originally one of the fortresses that were founded along the southern border of the Russian Empire neighboring the Caucasus mountains and were protected by the Don Cossacks who eventually became the first settlers of Labinskaya. Later, many peasants belonging to the Cossack social class, both Russians and Ukrainians, moved to Labinskaya from the inner territories of Russia. With a population over 30,000 people, Labinskaya soon became a big trade center among the neighboring stanitsas owing to its favorable location in the river valley.

In 1913, a railway station was built in Labinskaya that integrated it in the railway system of the Russian Empire. According to the 1926 census, the population was 63.7% Russian, 28.5% Ukrainian, 2.9% Armenian, and 1.6% Belarusian.

From August 1942 to January 1943, Labinskaya was occupied by the Germans. The residents were resisting the enemy—Labinsk Fighter Squadron was established in the stanitsa with Ivan Konstantinov appointed as the Commander-in-Chief. After the war, one of the central streets was named after him. On January 25, 1943, Labinskaya was liberated from the Nazi occupation.

In the post-war years, Labinskaya was quickly rebuilt and renovated. In 1947, the stanitsa was granted town status and renamed Labinsk.

== Administrative and municipal status ==
Within the framework of administrative divisions, Labinsk serves as the administrative center of Labinsky District, even though it is not a part of it. As an administrative division, together with two rural localities, it is incorporated separately as the Town of Labinsk—an administrative unit with the status equal to that of the districts. As a municipal division, the Town of Labinsk is incorporated within Labinsky Municipal District as Labinskoye Urban Settlement.

== Economy ==
- Food processing industry: canning plant, sugar refinery, cheese-making and meat-processing plants
- Light industry: sewing and footwear factory
- Chemical industry: paint-and-varnish plant

Cereal crops and potatoes are cultivated in the region. Melon-growing is widespread. Dairy cattle and pig breeding are a part of local agriculture.

In 1985–89, a cheese and whey processing plant was delivered by a Finnish consortium Valio-Hankkija-YIT.

== Tourism ==
There is Laba health resort on the territory of Labinsk town that boasts its healing medicinal waters. The composition of the water in Labinsk is reported to resemble the composition of Baden-Baden mineral waters.

The most popular routes take the tourists along the local sites, waterfalls, caves including the trips to Lago-Naki plateau, Azishsky cave as well as Round and Black Lakes in the village of Gornoye.
