= Veniamin Kondratyev =

Russian politician (born 1970)

- Вениамин Кондратьев
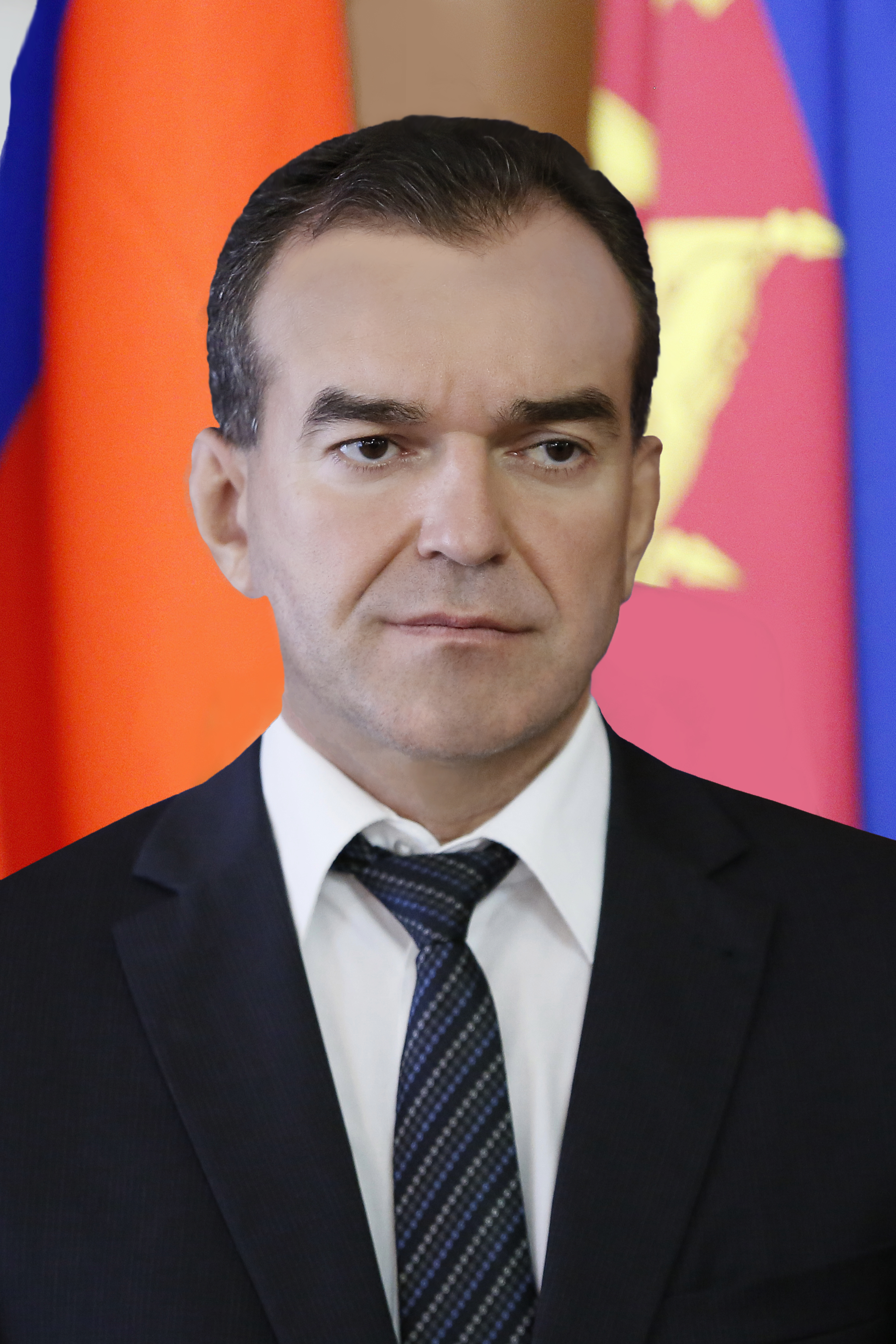
- Kondratyev in 2016

Governor of Krasnodar Krai
- Incumbent
- Assumed office 14 September 2015
- President: Vladimir Putin
- Preceded by: Aleksandr Tkachyov

Personal details
- Born: 1 September 1970 (age 56) Prokopyevsk, Kemerovo Oblast, Russian SFSR, Soviet Union
- Party: United Russia
- Education: Kuban State University
- Profession: Lawyer, Russian-language philologist

Veniamin Ivanovich Kondratyev (Russian: Вениамин Иванович Кондратьев; born 1 September 1970) is a Russian politician serving as the governor of Krasnodar Krai since 14 September 2015.

== Biography ==
In 1993 he graduated from the Kuban State University as a philologist and teacher of the Russian language. In 1995, he graduated from the same university as a lawyer.

In public service since 1994, he worked in the Jurist Department of the administration of Krasnodar Krai from 1994 to 1995, from 1995 – in the Lawyer Department of the administration of Krasnodar Krai. From 2001 to 2003—Deputy chief of staff, head of the Lawyer Department of administration of Krasnodar region.

Since August 2003, he has worked as deputy head of administration of Krasnodar Krai on issues of property, land, and legal relations. Since 30 July 2014, I have been working in the main office of the federal property of the Russian Federation the administration of the President of the Russian Federation.

January 2015—the head of the Main Department of Federal Property Management Department of the President of the Russian Federation, 12 March 2015—Deputy Manager of the President of the Russian Federation.

On 22 April 2015, by decree of the President of Russia, Kondratyev was appointed as the acting head of administration (Governor) of Krasnodar Krai.

On 14 September 2015, Kondratyev was elected Governor, with nearly 84% of the vote.

== Personal life ==
Kondratyev is married and has 2 children.

=== Sanctions ===
In 2022, Kondratyev was sanctioned by the British government following the start of the Russian invasion of Ukraine.

== Links ==
- Veniamin Kondratyev on VK
- Veniamin Kondratyev on Facebook
- Veniamin Kondratyev on Twitter
- Biography of Veniamin Kondratyev on the Official website of Krasnodar Krai

Preceded by Aleksandr Tkachyov	Governor of Krasnodar Krai since 14 September 2015	Succeeded by present
