= Kuban State Agrarian University =

Public university in Krasnodar, Russia

Coordinates: 45.0467°N 38.9285°E

- Кубанский государственный аграрный университет имени И.Т. Трубилина
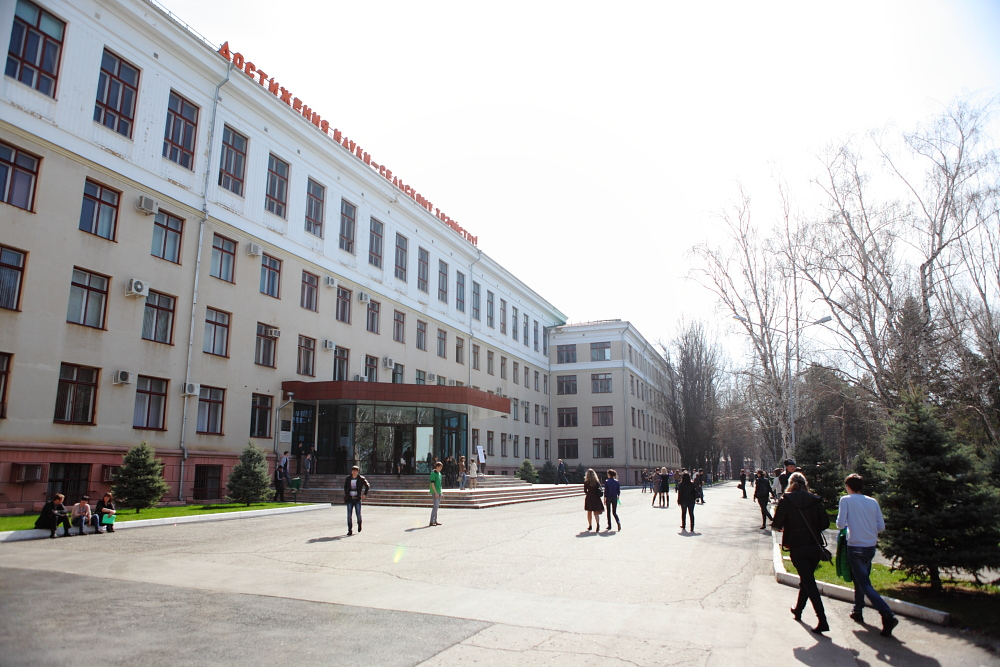
- Established: 1922; 104 years ago
- Students: 35 000
- Location: Krasnodar, Krasnodar Krai, Russia
- Website: http://kubsau.ru
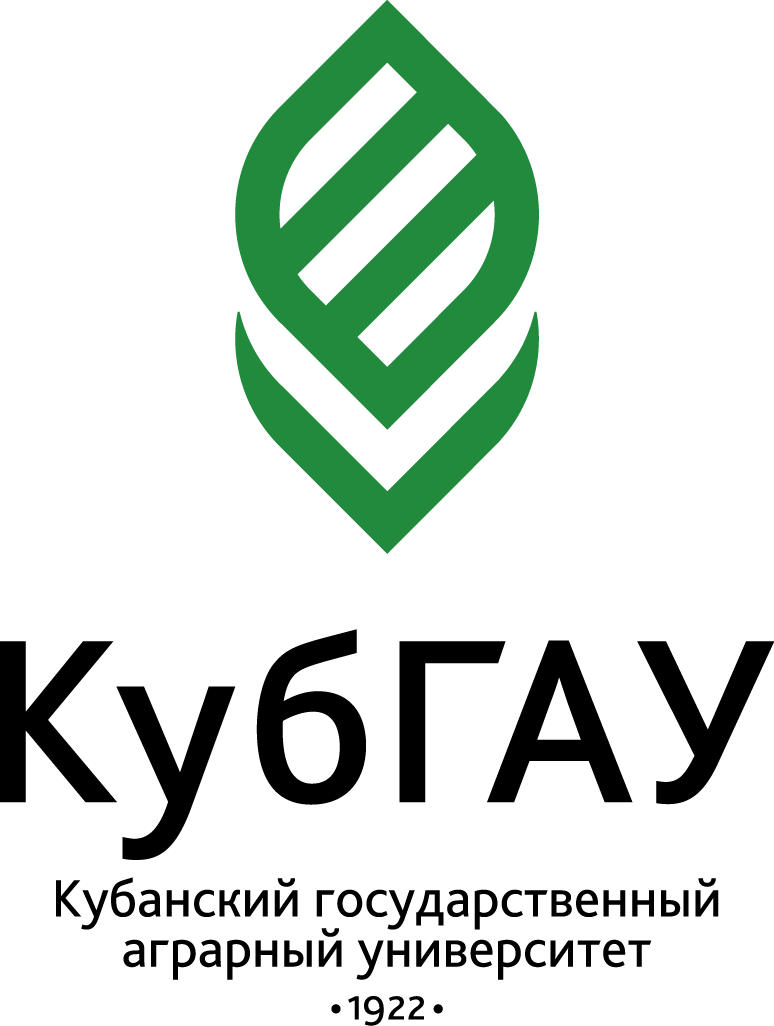

Kuban State Agrarian University (KubSAU; Russian: Кубанский государственный аграрный университет, КубГАУ) is a university located in Krasnodar, a city in southern Russia.

== History ==
In 1918, an agricultural department was established at the Kuban Polytechnic.

On March 12, 1922, by a decree of the People's Commissariat for Education of the USSR, the Kuban State Agricultural Institute was established and received legal independence.

In 1991, the institute was transformed into the Kuban State Agrarian University. The university is named after I.T. Trubilin.

From 1970 to 2007, the university was headed by Ivan Timofeevich Trubilin — Hero of Socialist Labour, Hero of Kuban Labour, honorary citizen of Krasnodar, Honored Scientist of the Russian Federation, Academician of the Russian Academy of Sciences, Doctor of Economics, Professor.

In April 2026, while the university was holding a video conference for the military recruitment of the Russian army, a Ukrainian soldier hacked the event and told the students he would be forced to kill them if they joined the army.

== Faculties ==
=== Agriculture ===
- Agronomical faculty
- Agrochemistry
- Plant protection
- Veterinary medicine
- Zoo engineering and management
- Fruit and vegetable cultivation
- Viticulture

=== Engineering ===
- Processing technologies
- Engineering and land use planning
- Land cadastre
- Water engineering and melioration
- Water supply and water removal
- Construction engineering
- Architectural engineering
- Mechanical faculty
- Power engineering and electrification

=== Economics ===
- Economics
- Financial accounting
- Finance and credit
- Applied information science
- Institute of digital economics and innovation (since 2022)

=== Other ===
- Administration
- Faculty of Law
- Military training center (MTC)

== Awards and honours ==
1967 - Order of the Red Banner of Labour (for services to the training of agricultural specialists, for the development of scientific research).

2015 - The university was awarded for its contribution to the development of the program "Leaders of the agroindustry" (cooperation with PepsiCo).

2022 - Rector Alexander Trubilin was awarded the medal of the Order "For Merit to the Fatherland" of the first degree.

благодарность Президента РФ «За вклад в сельскохозяйственную науку и подготовку высококвалифицированных специалистов

является членом Ассоциации восточно-европейских университетов, участником международных программ академической мобильности Erasmus+, DAAD, FULBRIGHT, LOGO, PRAXX, GerusAgro;
