= Labinsky District =

Labinsky District Лабинский район (Russian)
- District
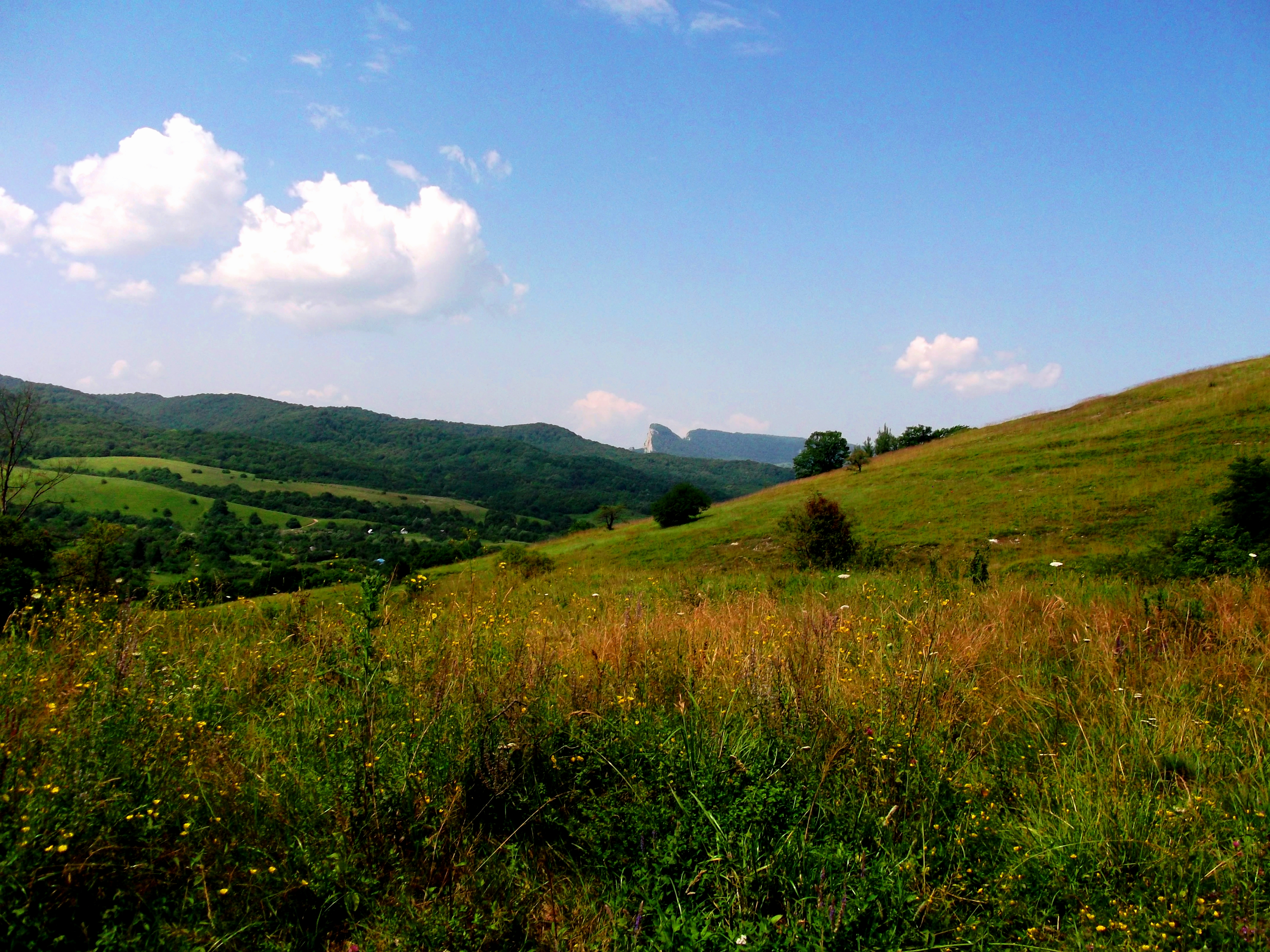
- Round Lake area, Labinsky District

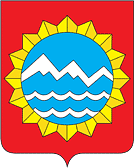
- Flag Coat of arms
- Location of Labinsky District in Krasnodar Krai
- Coordinates: 44°38′23″N 40°43′41″E
- Country: Russia
- Federal subject: Krasnodar Krai
- Established: 2 June 1924
- Administrative center: Labinsk

Area
  - Total: 1,843 km^{2} (712 sq mi)

Population (2010 Census)
  - Total: 37,443
  - Density: 20.32/km^{2} (52.62/sq mi)
  - Urban: 0%
  - Rural: 100%

Administrative structure
  - Administrative divisions: 12 Rural okrugs
  - Inhabited localities: 38 rural localities

Municipal structure
  - Municipally incorporated as: Labinsky Municipal District
  - Municipal divisions: 1 urban settlements, 12 rural settlements
- Time zone: UTC+3 (MSK)
- OKTMO ID: 03630000
- Website: http://www.labinskadmin.ru/

Labinsky District (Russian: Лаби́нский райо́н) is an administrative district (raion), one of the thirty-eight in Krasnodar Krai, Russia. As a municipal division, it is incorporated as Labinsky Municipal District. It is located in the southeast of the krai. The area of the district is 1,843 square kilometers (712 sq mi). Its administrative center is the town of Labinsk (which is not administratively a part of the district). Population: 37,443 (2010 census); 39,235 (2002 census); 37,580 (1989 Soviet census).

== Administrative and municipal status ==
Within the framework of administrative divisions, Labinsky District is one of the thirty-eight in the krai. The town of Labinsk serves as its administrative center, despite being incorporated separately as an administrative unit with the status equal to that of the districts (and which, in addition to Labinsk, also includes two rural localities).

As a municipal division, the district is incorporated as Labinsky Municipal District, with the Town of Labinsk being incorporated within it as Labinskoye Urban Settlement.
