= Priozerny =

Priozerny/Priozyorny (Russian: Прио́зерный/Приозёрный; masculine), Priozernaya/Priozyornaya (Прио́зерная/Приозёрная; feminine), or Priozernoye/Priozyornoye (Прио́зерное/Приозёрное; neuter) is a toponym.

== Modern localities ==
- Priozerny, Rubtsovsky District, Altai Krai, a settlement in Kuybyshevsky Selsoviet of Rubtsovsky District in Altai Krai; 51°34′N 81°12′E
- Priozerny, Ust-Kalmansky District, Altai Krai, a settlement in Priozerny Selsoviet of Ust-Kalmansky District in Altai Krai; 52°10′N 83°29′E
- Priozerny, Arkhangelsk Oblast, a settlement in Soyginsky Selsoviet of Verkhnetoyemsky District in Arkhangelsk Oblast
- Priozerny, Astrakhan Oblast, a settlement in Stepnovsky Selsoviet of Krasnoyarsky District in Astrakhan Oblast; 46°51′N 48°26′E
- Priozerny, Chelyabinsk Oblast, a settlement in Belonosovsky Selsoviet of Yetkulsky District in Chelyabinsk Oblast
- Priozerny, Komi Republic, a settlement in Priozerny Rural-type Settlement Administrative Territory of Kortkerossky District in the Komi Republic
- Priozerny, Krasnodar Krai, a settlement in Veselovsky Rural Okrug of Uspensky District in Krasnodar Krai
- Priozerny, Leningrad Oblast, a logging depot settlement in Yam-Tesovskoye Settlement Municipal Formation of Luzhsky District in Leningrad Oblast
- Priozerny, Murmansk Oblast, an inhabited locality in Alakurttinsky Territorial Okrug of Kandalakshsky District in Murmansk Oblast
- Priozerny, Novgorod Oblast, a settlement in Kostkovskoye Settlement of Valdaysky District in Novgorod Oblast
- Priozerny, Pskov Oblast, a settlement in Opochetsky District of Pskov Oblast
- Priozerny, Ryazan Oblast, a settlement in Zaboryevsky Rural Okrug of Ryazansky District in Ryazan Oblast
- Priozerny, Saratov Oblast, a settlement in Pitersky District of Saratov Oblast
- Priozerny, Stavropol Krai, a settlement in Sengileyevsky Selsoviet of Shpakovsky District in Stavropol Krai
- Priozerny, Sverdlovsk Oblast, a settlement in Nevyansky District of Sverdlovsk Oblast
- Priozerny, Tula Oblast, a settlement in Rozhdestvensky Rural Okrug of Kimovsky District in Tula Oblast
- Priozerny, Likhoslavlsky District, Tver Oblast, a settlement in Kavskoye Rural Settlement of Likhoslavlsky District in Tver Oblast
- Priozerny, Vyshnevolotsky District, Tver Oblast, a settlement in Solnechnoye Rural Settlement of Vyshnevolotsky District in Tver Oblast
- Priozerny, Ulyanovsk Oblast, a settlement in Zhivaykinsky Rural Okrug of Baryshsky District in Ulyanovsk Oblast
- Priozerny, Vladimir Oblast, a settlement in Vyaznikovsky District of Vladimir Oblast
- Priozerny, Volgograd Oblast, a settlement in Eltonsky Selsoviet of Pallasovsky District in Volgograd Oblast
- Priozerny, Yamalo-Nenets Autonomous Okrug, a settlement in Nadymsky District of Yamalo-Nenets Autonomous Okrug
- Priozerny, Pereslavsky District, Yaroslavl Oblast, a settlement in Troitsky Rural Okrug of Pereslavsky District in Yaroslavl Oblast
- Priozerny, Rostovsky District, Yaroslavl Oblast, a settlement in Perovsky Rural Okrug of Rostovsky District in Yaroslavl Oblast
- Priozernoye, Amur Oblast, a selo in Srednebelsky Rural Settlement of Ivanovsky District in Amur Oblast
- Priozernoye, Chernyakhovsky District, Kaliningrad Oblast, a settlement in Kaluzhsky Rural Okrug of Chernyakhovsky District in Kaliningrad Oblast
- Priozernoye, Gusevsky District, Kaliningrad Oblast, a settlement in Mikhaylovsky Rural Okrug of Gusevsky District in Kaliningrad Oblast
- Priozernoye, Krasnodar Krai, a selo under the administrative jurisdiction of Girey Settlement Okrug in Gulkevichsky District of Krasnodar Krai
- Priozernoye, Lipetsk Oblast, a selo in Verkhnematrensky Selsoviet of Dobrinsky District in Lipetsk Oblast
- Priozernoye, Primorsky Krai, a selo in Khorolsky District of Primorsky Krai
- Priozernoye, Sakhalin Oblast, a selo in Uglegorsky District of Sakhalin Oblast
- Priozernoye, Zabaykalsky Krai, a selo in Borzinsky District of Zabaykalsky Krai
- Priozernaya, Kurgan Oblast, a village in Kazak-Kocherdyksky Selsoviet of Tselinny District in Kurgan Oblast
- Priozernaya, Novgorod Oblast, a village in Polnovskoye Settlement of Demyansky District in Novgorod Oblast
- Priozernaya, Novosibirsk Oblast, a village in Kochenyovsky District of Novosibirsk Oblast
- Priozernaya, Pskov Oblast, a village in Ostrovsky District of Pskov Oblast
- Priozernaya, Republic of Tatarstan, a village in Alexeyevsky District of the Republic of Tatarstan
- Priozyornoye (Akmola Region), Kazakhstan.

== Alternative names ==
- Priozerny, alternative name of Evdik, a settlement in Chkalovskaya Rural Administration of Ketchenerovsky District in the Republic of Kalmykia; 47°21′N 45°12′E
- Priozerny, alternative name of Tsagan-Nur, a settlement in Tsagan-Nurskaya Rural Administration of Oktyabrsky District in the Republic of Kalmykia; 47°23′N 45°14′E
