= Administrative divisions of Krasnodar Krai =

Krasnodar Krai Russia
- Administrative center: Krasnodar

Administrative structure (as of 2013)
- Districts: 38
- Cities/towns: 15 (krai subordinance); 11 (raion subordinance)
- Urban-type settlements: 12
- Selsovets, rural okrugs, and stanitsa okrugs: 397

Municipal structure (as of 2002)
- Rural settlements: 1,719 (inhabited); 11 (uninhabited)

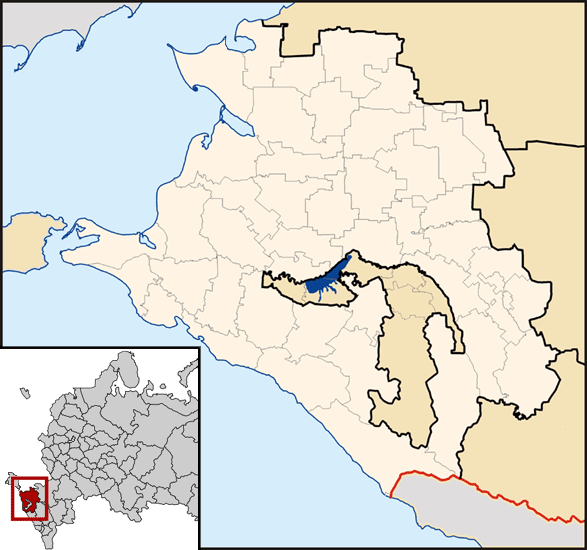
Map of administrative divisions of Krasnodar Krai

Krasnodar Krai is a federal subject of Russia.

== Cities and towns under the krai's jurisdiction ==
- Krasnodar (Краснодар) (administrative center)
  - city okrugs:
    - Karasunsky (Карасунский)
      - with 2 rural okrugs under the city okrug's jurisdiction.
    - Prikubansky (Прикубанский)
      - with 3 rural okrugs under the city okrug's jurisdiction.
    - Tsentralny (Центральный)
    - Zapadny (Западный)
- Anapa (Анапа)
  - with 2 rural okrugs under the town's jurisdiction.
- Armavir (Армавир)
  - with 3 rural okrugs under the town's jurisdiction.
- Belorechensk (Белореченск)
  - with 1 rural okrug under the town's jurisdiction.
- Gelendzhik (Геленджик)
  - with 4 selsovets under the town's jurisdiction.
- Goryachy Klyuch (Горячий Ключ)
  - with 7 rural okrugs under the town's jurisdiction.
- Kropotkin (Кропоткин)
- Krymsk (Крымск)
- Labinsk (Лабинск)
- Novorossiysk (Новороссийск)
  - City districts:
    - Primorsky (Приморский)
    - Tsentralny (Центральный)
    - Vostochny (Восточный)
    - Yuzhny (Южный)
  - with 6 rural okrugs under the city's jurisdiction.
- Slavyansk-na-Kubani (Славянск-на-Кубани)
- Sochi (Сочи)
  - City districts:
    - Adlersky (Адлерский)
      - Urban-type settlements under the city district's jurisdiction:
        - Krasnaya Polyana (Красная Поляна)
      - with 3 rural okrugs under the city district's jurisdiction.
    - Khostinsky (Хостинский)
      - with 2 rural okrugs under the city district's jurisdiction.
    - Lazarevsky (Лазаревский)
      - with 6 rural okrugs under the city district's jurisdiction.
    - Tsentralny (Центральный)
- Tikhoretsk (Тихорецк)
  - with 1 rural okrug under the town's jurisdiction.
- Tuapse (Туапсе)
- Yeysk (Ейск)
  - with 1 rural okrug under the town's jurisdiction.

== Federal territory ==
- Urban-type settlements:
  Sirius (Сириус)

== Districts ==
- Abinsky (Абинский)
  - Towns under the district's jurisdiction:
    - Abinsk (Абинск)
  - Urban-type settlements under the district's jurisdiction:
    - Akhtyrsky (Ахтырский)
  - with 6 rural okrugs under the district's jurisdiction.
- Anapsky (Анапский)
  - with 8 rural okrugs under the district's jurisdiction.
- Apsheronsky (Апшеронский)
  - Towns under the district's jurisdiction:
    - Apsheronsk (Апшеронск)
    - Khadyzhensk (Хадыженск)
  - Urban-type settlements under the district's jurisdiction:
    - Neftegorsk (Нефтегорск)
  - with 9 rural okrugs under the district's jurisdiction.
- Beloglinsky (Белоглинский)
  - with 4 rural okrugs and stanitsa okrugs under the district's jurisdiction.
- Belorechensky (Белореченский)
  - with 9 rural okrugs under the district's jurisdiction.
- Bryukhovetsky (Брюховецкий)
  - with 8 rural okrugs under the district's jurisdiction.
- Dinskoy (Динской)
  - with 10 rural okrugs under the district's jurisdiction.
- Gulkevichsky (Гулькевичский)
  - Towns under the district's jurisdiction:
    - Gulkevichi (Гулькевичи)
  - Urban-type settlements under the district's jurisdiction:
    - Girey (Гирей)
    - Krasnoselsky (Красносельский)
  - with 12 rural okrugs and stanitsa okrugs under the district's jurisdiction.
- Kalininsky (Калининский)
  - with 8 rural okrugs under the district's jurisdiction.
- Kanevskoy (Каневской)
  - with 9 rural okrugs under the district's jurisdiction.
- Kavkazsky (Кавказский)
  - with 8 rural okrugs under the district's jurisdiction.
- Korenovsky (Кореновский)
  - Towns under the district's jurisdiction:
    - Korenovsk (Кореновск)
  - with 9 rural okrugs under the district's jurisdiction.
- Krasnoarmeysky (Красноармейский)
  - with 10 rural okrugs under the district's jurisdiction.
- Krylovsky (Крыловский)
  - with 6 rural okrugs under the district's jurisdiction.
- Krymsky (Крымский)
  - with 10 rural okrugs under the district's jurisdiction.
- Kurganinsky (Курганинский)
  - Towns under the district's jurisdiction:
    - Kurganinsk (Курганинск)
  - with 9 rural okrugs under the district's jurisdiction.
- Kushchyovsky (Кущёвский)
  - with 13 rural okrugs under the district's jurisdiction.
- Labinsky (Лабинский)
  - with 12 rural okrugs under the district's jurisdiction.
- Leningradsky (Ленинградский)
  - with 12 rural okrugs under the district's jurisdiction.
- Mostovsky (Мостовский)
  - Urban-type settlements under the district's jurisdiction:
    - Mostovskoy (Мостовской)
    - Psebay (Псебай)
  - with 12 rural okrugs under the district's jurisdiction.
- Novokubansky (Новокубанский)
  - Towns under the district's jurisdiction:
    - Novokubansk (Новокубанск)
  - with 8 rural okrugs under the district's jurisdiction.
- Novopokrovsky (Новопокровский)
  - with 8 rural okrugs under the district's jurisdiction.
- Otradnensky (Отрадненский)
  - with 14 rural okrugs under the district's jurisdiction.
- Pavlovsky (Павловский)
  - with 11 rural okrugs and stanitsa okrugs under the district's jurisdiction.
- Primorsko-Akhtarsky (Приморско-Ахтарский)
  - Towns under the district's jurisdiction:
    - Primorsko-Akhtarsk (Приморско-Ахтарск)
  - with 8 rural okrugs under the district's jurisdiction.
- Seversky (Северский)
  - Urban-type settlements under the district's jurisdiction:
    - Afipsky (Афипский)
    - Chernomorsky (Черноморский)
    - Ilsky (Ильский)
  - with 9 rural okrugs under the district's jurisdiction.
- Shcherbinovsky (Щербиновский)
  - with 8 rural okrugs under the district's jurisdiction.
- Slavyansky (Славянский)
  - with 14 rural okrugs under the district's jurisdiction.
- Starominsky (Староминский)
  - with 5 rural okrugs under the district's jurisdiction.
- Tbilissky (Тбилисский)
  - with 8 rural okrugs under the district's jurisdiction.
- Temryuksky (Темрюкский)
  - Towns under the district's jurisdiction:
    - Temryuk (Темрюк)
  - with 11 rural okrugs under the district's jurisdiction.
- Tikhoretsky (Тихорецкий)
  - with 11 rural okrugs under the district's jurisdiction.
- Timashyovsky (Тимашёвский)
  - Towns under the district's jurisdiction:
    - Timashyovsk (Тимашёвск)
  - with 9 rural okrugs under the district's jurisdiction.
- Tuapsinsky (Туапсинский)
  - Urban-type settlements under the district's jurisdiction:
    - Dzhubga resort settlement (Джубга)
    - Novomikhaylovsky resort settlement (Новомихайловский)
  - with 7 rural okrugs under the district's jurisdiction.
- Uspensky (Успенский)
  - with 10 rural okrugs under the district's jurisdiction.
- Ust-Labinsky (Усть-Лабинский)
  - Towns under the district's jurisdiction:
    - Ust-Labinsk (Усть-Лабинск)
  - with 13 rural okrugs under the district's jurisdiction.
- Vyselkovsky (Выселковский)
  - with 10 rural okrugs under the district's jurisdiction.
- Yeysky (Ейский)
  - with 10 rural okrugs under the district's jurisdiction.
