= Uspensky (disambiguation) =

Uspensky is an East-European surname.

Uspensky of Uspenski may also refer to:

- Uspenska street , street in Burgas (Bulgaria)
- Uspenska street , street in Novi-Sad (Serbia)
- Uspensky (rural locality), multiple rural communities with this name in Russia
- Uspensky District, a district in Krasnodar Krai
- Uspenski Cathedral, an Eastern Orthodox cathedral in Helsinki, Finland
- Dormition Cathedral (disambiguation), the names of many of which may be occasionally transliterated from Russian "Успенский собор" as "Uspensky Sobor" or "Uspensky Cathedral"
- The Assumption Castle, an estate castle in Moscow Oblast, Russia, which is named "Uspensky Castle" (Успенский замок) in Russian
