= Uspensky (rural locality) =

Uspensky (Russian: Успе́нский; masculine), Uspenskaya (Успе́нская; feminine), or Uspenskoye (Успе́нское; neuter) is the name of several rural localities in Russia:

- Uspensky, Bryansk Oblast, a settlement in Bryansky District of Bryansk Oblast
- Uspensky, name of several other rural localities
- Uspenskaya (rural locality), a stanitsa in Beloglinsky District of Krasnodar Krai
- Uspenskoye, Kaduysky District, Vologda Oblast, a selo in Semizerye Rural Settlement, Kaduysky District, Vologda Oblast
- Uspenskoye, Krasnodar Krai, a selo in Uspensky District of Krasnodar Krai
- Uspenskoye, Voronezh Oblast, a selo in Korotoyakskoye Rural Settlement, Ostrogozhsky District, Voronezh Oblast
- Uspenskoye, name of several other rural localities
