= Gulkevichsky =

Gulkevichsky (masculine), Gulkevichskaya (feminine), or Gulkevichskoye (neuter) may refer to:

- Gulkevichsky District, a district of Krasnodar Krai, Russia
- Gulkevichskoye Urban Settlement, a municipal formation which the Town of Gulkevichi in Gulkevichsky District of Krasnodar Krai is incorporated as
