= Tikhoretsky =

Tikhoretsky (masculine), Tikhoretskaya (feminine), or Tikhoretskoye (neuter) may refer to:

- Tikhoretsky District, a district of Krasnodar Krai, Russia
- Tikhoretskoye Urban Settlement, a municipal formation within Tikhoretsky Municipal District which the Town of Tikhoretsk in Krasnodar Krai, Russia is incorporated as
- Tikhoretskoye (rural locality), a rural locality (a village) in Omsk Oblast, Russia

== See also ==
- Tikhoretsk, a town in Krasnodar Krai, Russia
