= Konokovo =

Konokovo (Russian: Коноково) is the name of several rural localities in Russia:

- Konokovo, Krasnodar Krai, a selo in Konokovsky Rural Okrug of Uspensky District of Krasnodar Krai
- Konokovo, Tver Oblast, a village in Velikooktyabrskoye Rural Settlement of Firovsky District of Tver Oblast
