= Kurganinsky =

Kurganinsky (masculine), Kurganinskaya (feminine), or Kurganinskoye (neuter) may refer to:

- Kurganinsky District, a district of Krasnodar Krai, Russia
- Kurganinskoye Urban Settlement, a municipal formation which the Town of Kurganinsk in Kurganinsky District of Krasnodar Krai, Russia is incorporated as
