= Krasnoselsky (inhabited locality) =

Krasnoselsky (Russian: Красносе́льский; masculine), Krasnoselskaya (Красносе́льская; feminine), or Krasnoselskoye (Красносе́льское; neuter) is the name of several inhabited localities in Russia.

Urban localities

- Krasnoselsky, Krasnodar Krai, an urban-type settlement in Gulkevichsky District of Krasnodar Krai

Rural localities

- Krasnoselsky, Novosibirsk Oblast, a settlement in Karasuksky District of Novosibirsk Oblast
- Krasnoselskoye, Kabardino-Balkarian Republic, a selo in Prokhladnensky District of the Kabardino-Balkarian Republic
- Krasnoselskoye, name of several other rural localities

== See also ==
- Zheleznodorozhnoy stantsii Krasnoselskaya, a village in Ivanovsky District of Ivanovo Oblast
- Krasnoye Selo (inhabited locality)
