= Kasperski =

Kasperski (also spelled Kaspersky) is a family name of East European origin. Formed by adding a Slavic adjective-forming suffix -ski (masc., also spelled -skii, -skiy; fem. -ska (Polish etc.), -skaya(Rus.)) to the Western men's personal name Kasper/Casper.

Kasperski or Kaspersky may refer to:

== People ==
=== Kasperski ===
- Lindy Kasperski, a former Canadian politician.
- Wojciech Kasperski, a Polish screenwriter, film director and producer.

=== Kaspersky ===
- Eugene Kaspersky, co-founder and head of Kaspersky Lab
- Natalya Kaspersky, co-founder of Kaspersky Lab, Eugene Kaspersky's ex-wife
- Ivan Kaspersky, the son of Eugene and Natalya Kaspersky
- Kris Kaspersky (1976–2017), security researcher, unrelated to the founders of Kaspersky Lab

== Businesses and business products ==
- Kaspersky Lab, a multinational computer security company, and its products
  - Kaspersky Anti-Virus, anti-malware software
  - Kaspersky Internet Security, an Internet security suite

== Other ==
- Kaspersky Commonwealth Antarctic Expedition
