= Krasnoye Selo (inhabited locality) =

Krasnoye Selo (Russian: Красное Село) is the name of several inhabited localities in Russia.

== Modern localities ==
Urban localities

- Krasnoye Selo, a municipal town in Krasnoselsky District of the federal city of St. Petersburg

Rural localities

- Krasnoye Selo, Arkhangelsk Oblast, a village in Lomonosovsky Selsoviet of Kholmogorsky District in Arkhangelsk Oblast; 64°14′N 41°44′E
- Krasnoye Selo, Kaliningrad Oblast, a settlement under the administrative jurisdiction of the town of district significance of Neman in Nemansky District of Kaliningrad Oblast
- Krasnoye Selo, Moscow Oblast, a village in Seredinskoye Rural Settlement of Shakhovskoy District in Moscow Oblast; 55°55′N 35°31′E
- Krasnoye Selo, Vologda Oblast, a village in Pogossky Selsoviet of Kichmengsko-Gorodetsky District in Vologda Oblast

== Alternative names ==
- Krasnoye Selo, alternative name of Krasnoselsk, a selo in Ynyrginskoye Rural Settlement of Choysky District in the Altai Republic; 51°49′N 86°48′E
- Krasnoye Selo, alternative name of Krasnoye, a selo in Kharikolinsky Selsoviet of Khunzakhsky District in the Republic of Dagestan; 43°16′N 47°06′E
- Krasnoye selo, alternative name of Iki-Bukhus, a settlement in Iki-Bukhusovskaya Rural Administration of Maloderbetovsky District in the Republic of Kalmykia; 48°03′N 45°14′E
- Krasnoye Selo, alternative name of Krasnoye, a selo in Chanovsky District of Novosibirsk Oblast; 55°32′N 76°49′E

== See also ==
- Krasnoselsky (inhabited locality)
