= Mikhail Ignatievich Belousov =

Soviet sniper in World war 2

Mikhail Belousov
- Михаил Игнатьевич Белоусов
- Born: 21 February [O.S. 8 February] 1894; Zdolbuniv, Volhynian Governorate, Russian Empire
- Died: 1 March 1956 (aged 62); Girey, Krasnodar Krai, RSFSR, USSR
- Military career
- Allegiance: Soviet Union
- Branch: Red Army
- Service years: 1917–1924; 1941–1946
- Rank: Lieutenant
- Unit: 1179th Rifle Regiment
- Conflicts: Russian Civil War; World War II
- Awards: Hero of the Soviet Union

Mikhail Ignatievich Belousov (Russian: Михаил Игнатьевич Белоусов; 21 February [O.S. 8 February] 1894—1 March 1956) was one of the top Soviet snipers in World War II who killed an estimated 350 Nazis.

== Early life ==
Belousov was born on 21 February [O.S. 8 February] 1894 to a working-class Russian family in Zdolbuniv. From 1917 to 1924 he fought in the Russian Civil War on the side of the Red Army.

== World War II ==
Belousov became part of the Red Army again in June 1941 to fight the German invasion of the Soviet Union. He soon showed himself to be a good commander and sniper. He was awarded the Order of the Red Star on 19 January 1943 for killing 64 enemies, and on 26 October 1943 he was awarded the title Hero of the Soviet Union for killing 245 Nazis. Estimates put his total number of kills during the war at around 350. He also trained 200 other snipers, who killed thousands of Nazis.

== Postwar ==
He was demobilized in 1946 and lived in Girey, where he died on 1 March 1956.
