= Tuapsinsky =

Tuapsinsky (masculine), Tuapsinskaya (feminine), or Tuapsinskoye (neuter) may refer to:

- Tuapsinsky District, a district of Krasnodar Krai, Russia
- Tuapsinskoye Urban Settlement, a municipal formation within Tuapsinsky Municipal District which the Town of Tuapse in Krasnodar Krai, Russia is incorporated as
