= Uspensky =

Uspensky (Russian: Успе́нский, Polish-Uśpieński), or Uspenskaya (feminine; Успе́нская, Uśpieńska) is an East European surname. Notable people with the surname include:

== People ==
- Aap Uspenski (born 1966), Estonian wrestler and strongman
- Aleksandr Uspensky (1902–1940), Soviet NKVD officer
- Andrej Uspenski, Russian photographer
- Boris Uspensky (born 1937), Russian philologist and historian
- Eduard Uspensky (1937–2018), Russian writer
- Fyodor Uspensky (1845–1928), Russian Byzantinist
- Gleb Uspensky (1843–1902), Russian writer
- J. V. Uspensky (1883–1947), Stanford University mathematician
- Lev Uspensky (1900–1978), Soviet writer
- Lyubov Uspenskaya (born 1954), popular Ukrainian/Russian chanson singer
- Maria Ouspenskaya (1876–1949), Russian actress and acting teacher
- Marina Uspenskaya (1925–2007), Russian book designer and graphics painter
- Nikolai Uspensky (1837–1889), Russian writerEstonia
- Peter Uspensky (1878–1947), Russian esotericist and philosopher, known as P. D. Ouspensky
- Porphyrius Uspensky (1804–1885), Russian traveller and theologian
- Vladimir Andreyevich Uspensky (born 1930), Soviet/Russian mathematician

== See also ==
- Boris Uspenskij
