= WMU =

WMU may refer to:

- Western Michigan University
- Wildlife Management Unit, the areas into which Pennsylvania's wilderness area are divided into.
- Woman's Missionary Union
- World Maritime University
- Wing Management Utilities for Civil Air Patrol
- Hryvnia-equivalent Webmoney
