= Konokovo, Krasnodar Krai =

Konokovo Коноково
- Selo
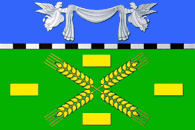
- Flag
- Interactive map of Konokovo
- Location of Konokovo Konokovo (European Russia) Konokovo (Russia)
- Coordinates: 44°51′45″N 41°19′31″E
- Country: Russia
- Federal subject: Krasnodar Krai
- Administrative district: Uspensky District
- Founded: 1901
- Elevation: 236 m (774 ft)

Population (2010 Census)
  - Total: 7,880
  - Estimate (2023): 8,235 (+4.5%)
- Time zone: UTC+3 (MSK)
- Postal code: 352464
- OKTMO ID: 03656410101

Konokovo (Russian: Коноково, Ukrainian: Конокове, romanized: Konokove) is a rural locality (a selo) in Uspensky District of Krasnodar Krai, Russia, located on the Kuban River. Population: 7,880 (2010 census); 7,411 (2002 census); 6,335 (1926 census)

According to the 1926 census, the population was 57.4% Ukrainian and 40.5% Russian.
