= Tikhoretsk (air base) =

Airport in Krasnodar Krai, Russia

Tikhoretsk
- Tikhoretsk, Krasnodar Krai in Russia
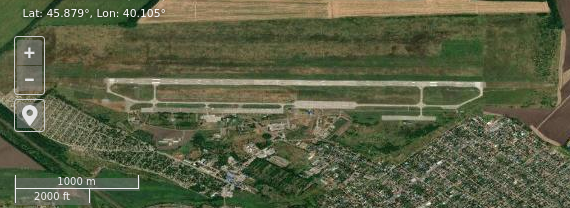
- Satellite imagery of Tikhoretsk air base

Site information
- Type: Air Base
- Owner: Ministry of Defence
- Operator: Russian Aerospace Forces

Location
- Shown within Krasnodar Krai Tikhoretsk (Russia)
- Coordinates: 45°52′43″N 40°06′19″E

Site history
- In use: present

Airfield information
- Identifiers: ICAO: URKT
- Elevation: 79 metres (259 ft) AMSL
Runways
Direction	Length and surface
08/26	2,500 metres (8,202 ft) Concrete

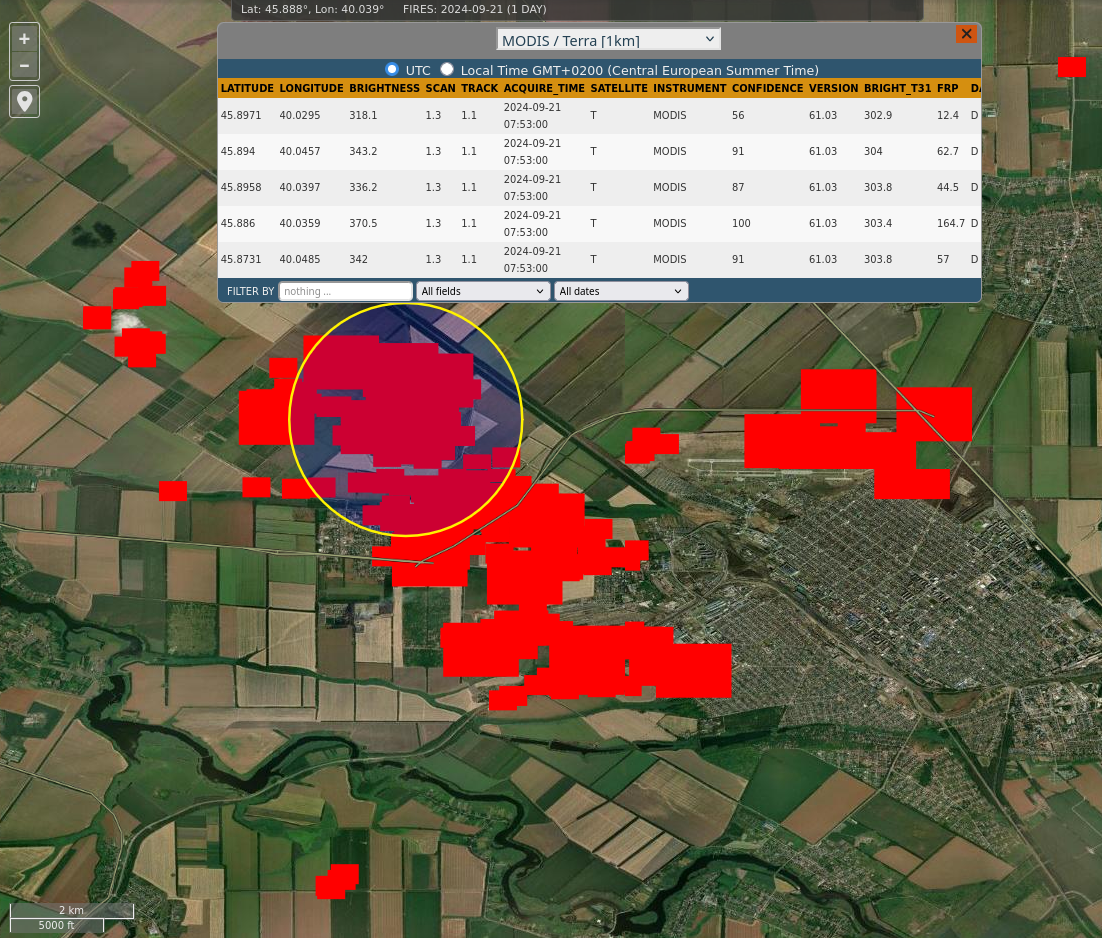
NASA's FIRMS imagery shows fires at the airbase north of Tikhoretsk and at the rail yard west of and at the GRAU arsenal northwest of the town on 21 September 2024

Tikhoretsk is an airbase of the Russian Aerospace Forces located near Tikhoretsk, Krasnodar Krai, Russia.

The base is home to the 627th Training Aviation Regiment with the Aero L-39C Albatros as part of the Krasnodar Higher Military Aviation School of Pilots.

On 21 September 2024 the air base suffered fires after a Ukrainian drone attack that also destroyed a nearby GRAU arsenal.

== See also ==
- List of military airbases in Russia
