= Novomikhaylovsky =

Novomikhaylovsky Новомихайловский
- Urban-type settlement
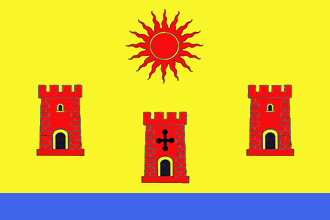
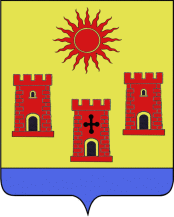
- Flag Coat of arms
- Interactive map of Novomikhaylovsky
- Location of Novomikhaylovsky Novomikhaylovsky (European Russia) Novomikhaylovsky (Russia) Novomikhaylovsky (Black Sea)
- Coordinates: 44.2534°N 38.8451°E
- Country: Russia
- Federal subject: Krasnodar Krai
- Administrative district: Tuapsinsky District
- Founded: 1864
- Elevation: 8 m (26 ft)

Population (2010 Census)
  - Total: 10,213
  - Estimate (2023): 10,134 (−0.8%)
- Time zone: UTC+3 (MSK)
- Postal codes: 352855, 352856, 352857
- OKTMO ID: 03655158051

Novomikhaylovsky (Russian: Новомиха́йловский) is an urban locality (an urban-type settlement) in Tuapsinsky District of Krasnodar Krai, Russia. Population: 10,213 (2010 census); 10,238 (2002 census); 10,410 (1989 Soviet census).

According to the 1926 census, it had a population of 896, 71.2% Ukrainian and 18.0% Russian.
