= Mostovsky District =

Mostovsky District Мостовский район (Russian)
- District
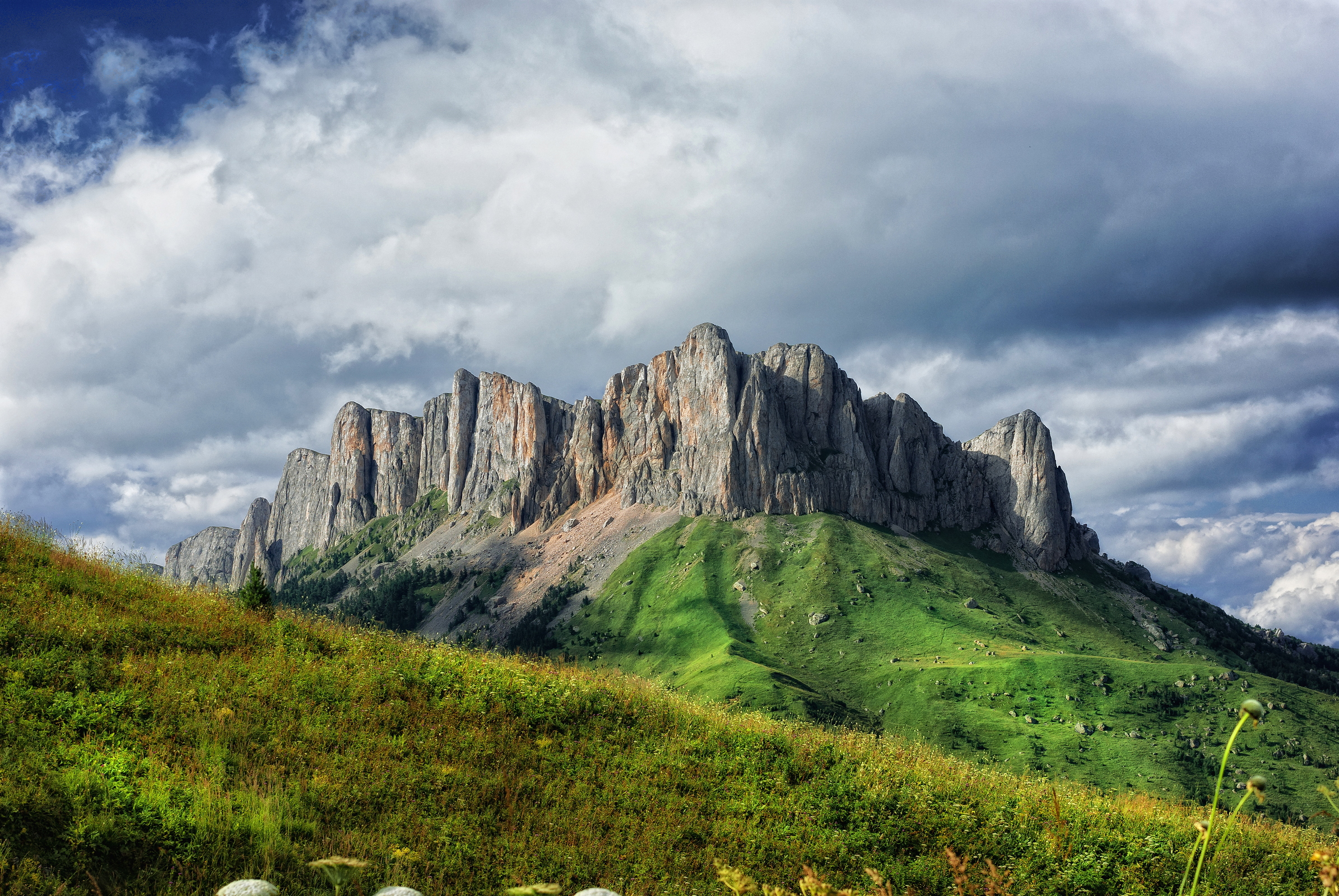
- Mount Bolshoy Tkhach in Mostovsky District

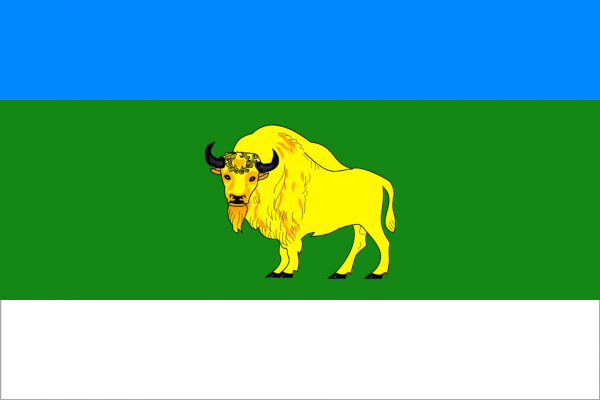
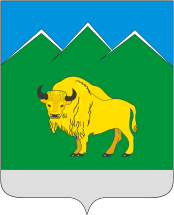
- Flag Coat of arms
- Location of Mostovsky District in Krasnodar Krai
- Coordinates: 44°24′32″N 40°47′50″E
- Country: Russia
- Federal subject: Krasnodar Krai
- Established: 1924
- Administrative center: Mostovskoy

Area
  - Total: 3,699 km^{2} (1,428 sq mi)

Population (2010 Census)
  - Total: 71,178
  - Density: 19.24/km^{2} (49.84/sq mi)
  - Urban: 50.5%
  - Rural: 49.5%

Administrative structure
  - Administrative divisions: 2 Settlement okrugs, 12 Rural okrugs
  - Inhabited localities: 2 urban-type settlements, 37 rural localities

Municipal structure
  - Municipally incorporated as: Mostovsky Municipal District
  - Municipal divisions: 2 urban settlements, 12 rural settlements
- Time zone: UTC+3 (MSK)
- OKTMO ID: 03633000
- Website: http://www.mostovskiy.ru/

Mostovsky District (Russian: Мосто́вский райо́н) is an administrative district (raion), one of the thirty-eight in Krasnodar Krai, Russia. As a municipal division, it is incorporated as Mostovsky Municipal District. It is located in the southeast of the krai. The area of the district is 3,699 square kilometers (1,428 sq mi). Its administrative center is the urban locality (an urban-type settlement) of Mostovskoy. Population: 71,178 (2010 census); 72,660 (2002 census); 65,368 (1989 Soviet census). The population of Mostovskoy accounts for 35.2% of the district's total population.
