= WebMoney =

Russian online payment system

WebMoney Transfer
- Type: Online payment solution
- Founded: November 1998; 27 years ago in Moscow
- Headquarters: Moscow, Russia
- Services: Online payments, Payment processor
- Parent: WebMoney Transfer Ltd
- Website: Official website

WebMoney is an online payment settlement system established in Russia in 1998. It is one of the largest electronic payments processors in Russia by number of users, with the company reporting 45 million registered accounts and 300,000 active weekly users in early 2020, and 100,000 stores accepting payments via the system. WebMoney is owned and operated by WM Transfer Ltd.

== Service ==
WebMoney users' funds are stored in a "purse", which holds electronic money corresponding to an underlying asset, such as a currency. The underlying assets for WebMoney units are held by a global network of companies that act as guarantors for the payment system. Guarantors accept deposits in the underlying assets and issue the corresponding WebMoney units. WebMoney Transfer can be used for peer-to-peer payments, and includes an escrow system. It charges 0.8% of the transacted amount in fees, up to a maximum fee of €50.

WebMoney provides an application called WebMoney Keeper for using their payments services, for Microsoft Windows, Windows Phone, Android, iOS, and Blackberry. In 2006, security researcher Kris Kaspersky criticised WebMoney Keeper Classic for Windows, as it installed a low-level device driver that allowed direct access to the I/O ports and accessed the hard disk directly using ATA commands instead of via the operating system.

== History ==
The company was founded in November 1998 in Russia as a money transfer system for United States dollars, in the wake of the 1998 Russian financial crisis that had led to increased US dollar use in Russia.

In November 2015, WebMoney Europe Ltd, based in Cambridge, United Kingdom, was granted an FCA licence to issue e-money within the European Economic Area. On 01-01-2021, the company terminated its agreements with all WebMoney EUR wallet holders as a result of Brexit.

In 2019, Sberbank said that WebMoney had joined its instant transfer ecosystem, allowing clients to make instant transfers from Sberbank cards to WebMoney purses and vice versa. The recipient’s phone number (which the card or purse is tied to) is needed to transfer funds.

In March 2019, the international settlement system WebMoney introduced a video identification system for customers.

The WebMoney Transfer system offered the solution of accepting payments via QR code for restaurants and shops. Customers need to scan a QR code displayed on the cash till screen and confirm the payment. In 2019, Burger King Russia has partnered with WebMoney Transfer to integrate QR code payments for customers.

On February 11, 2022, the Central Bank of Russian Federation revoked the license of KKB Bank JSC, the guarantor and the settlement bank for WebMoney's Russian ruble wallets, freezing WebMoney's funds on KKB's accounts.

=== In Ukraine ===
In June 2013, the Ukrainian government seized computer equipment from the Ukrainian guarantor and froze ₴60 million (US$7.5 million) of funds residing on guarantor's accounts in Ukraine, causing Ukrainian WebMoney transactions to be blocked. Officials of the Ministry of Revenues and Duties of Ukraine said that there were major irregularities in the operations of the company acting as the Ukrainian guarantor, and that the rules of the operation of the payment system were not agreed with the National Bank of Ukraine. The ministry described WebMoney as an "illegal system" that was suspected of being used for money laundering and tax evasion, and the central bank said that WebMoney did not have a licence to operate in Ukraine. WebMoney transactions resumed in Ukraine the following week.

In March 2015, the Ukrainian guarantor's bank accounts were released after a court ruling. Later that year, the National Bank of Ukraine and the State Savings Bank of Ukraine partnered with WebMoney.UA.

In May 2018, the National Bank of Ukraine has abolished the registration of the inner-state payment system WebMoney.UA (the subsidiary of 'Financing company ElMI', Kyiv) as it was put on the sanctions list of the National Security and Defense Council of Ukraine.
