= Priozernoye, Amur Oblast =

Priozernoye Приозёрное
- Selo
- Location within Amur Oblast Location within Russia
- Coordinates: 50°41′N 127°57′E
- Country: Russia
- Region: Amur Oblast
- District: Ivanovsky District
- Time zone: UTC+9:00

Priozernoye (Russian: Приозёрное) is a rural locality (a selo) in Srednebelsky Selsoviet of Ivanovsky District, Amur Oblast, Russia. The population was 184 as of 2018. There are 7 streets.

== Geography ==
Priozernoye is located 49 km north of Ivanovka (the district's administrative centre) by road. Srednebelaya is the nearest rural locality.
