= Tikhoretsk =

Town in Krasnodar Krai, Russia

Tikhoretsk Тихорецк
- Town
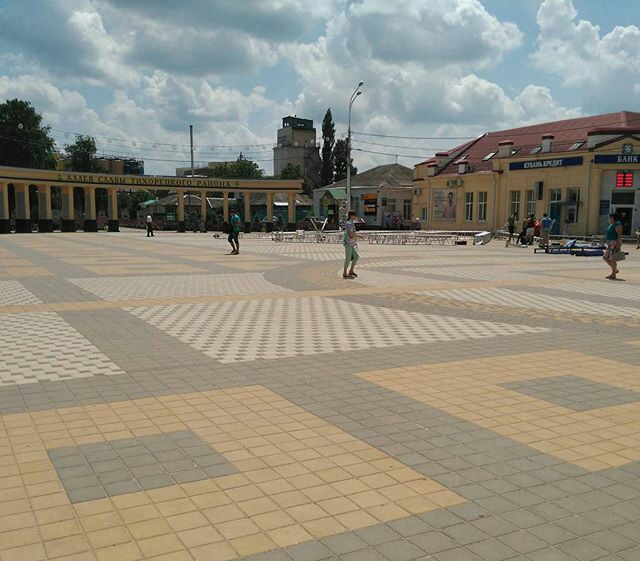
- Zhukov Square

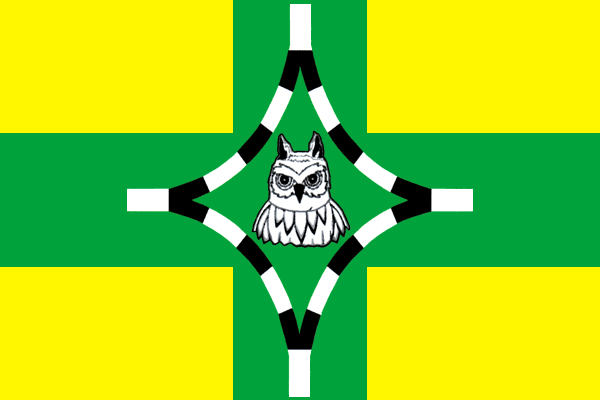
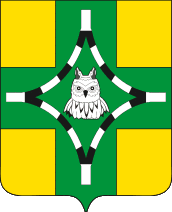
- Flag Coat of arms
- Interactive map of Tikhoretsk
- Location of Tikhoretsk Tikhoretsk (Russia)
- Coordinates: 45°52′N 40°08′E
- Country: Russia
- Federal subject: Krasnodar Krai
- Founded: 1874
- Elevation: 80 m (260 ft)

Population (2010 Census)
  - Total: 61,823
  - Estimate (2025): 54,009 (−12.6%)
  - Rank: 259th in 2010

Administrative status
  - Subordinated to: Town of Tikhoretsk
  - Capital of: Town of Tikhoretsk, Tikhoretsky District

Municipal status
  - Municipal district: Tikhoretsky Municipal District
  - Urban settlement: Tikhoretskoye Urban Settlement
  - Capital of: Tikhoretsky Municipal District, Tikhoretskoye Urban Settlement
- Time zone: UTC+3 (MSK)
- Postal code: 352120–352129
- OKTMO ID: 03654101001

Tikhoretsk (Russian: Тихоре́цк) is a town in Krasnodar Krai, Russia. It is the administrative center of the Tikhoretsky urban settlement and the Tikhoretsky District of the Krasnodar Territory. Population: 55,686 (2021 census); 61,823 (2010 census); 65,005 (2002 census); 67,105 (1989 Soviet census).

== Administrative and municipal status ==
Within the framework of administrative divisions, Tikhoretsk serves as the administrative center of Tikhoretsky District, even though it is not a part of it. As an administrative division, it is, together with the territory of Prigorodnensky Rural Okrug (which comprises two rural localities), incorporated separately as the Town of Tikhoretsk—an administrative unit with the status equal to that of the districts. As a municipal division, the Town of Tikhoretsk is incorporated within Tikhoretsky Municipal District as Tikhoretskoye Urban Settlement.

== Transportation ==
The town is an important part of the southern rail network. Tikhoretsk (air base), a Russian Air Force base is nearby.

After the 2022 Russian invasion of Ukraine, the United States announced in October 2023 that large quantities of North Korean ammunition were being transported by rail to an ammunition depot in Tikhoretsk.
