= Priozerny, Astrakhan Oblast =

Priozerny Приозёрный
- Settlement
- Location within Astrakhan Oblast Location within Russia
- Coordinates: 46°50′N 48°25′E
- Country: Russia
- Region: Astrakhan Oblast
- District: Krasnoyarsky District
- Time zone: UTC+4:00

Priozerny (Russian: Приозёрный) is a rural locality (a settlement) in Aksaraysky Selsoviet, Krasnoyarsky District, Astrakhan Oblast, Russia. The population was 18 as of 2010. There are 2 streets.

== Geography ==
Priozerny is located 41 km north of Krasny Yar (the district's administrative centre) by road. Maly Aral is the nearest rural locality.
