= Mostovskoy, Krasnodar Krai =

Mostovskoy Мостовской
- Urban-type settlement
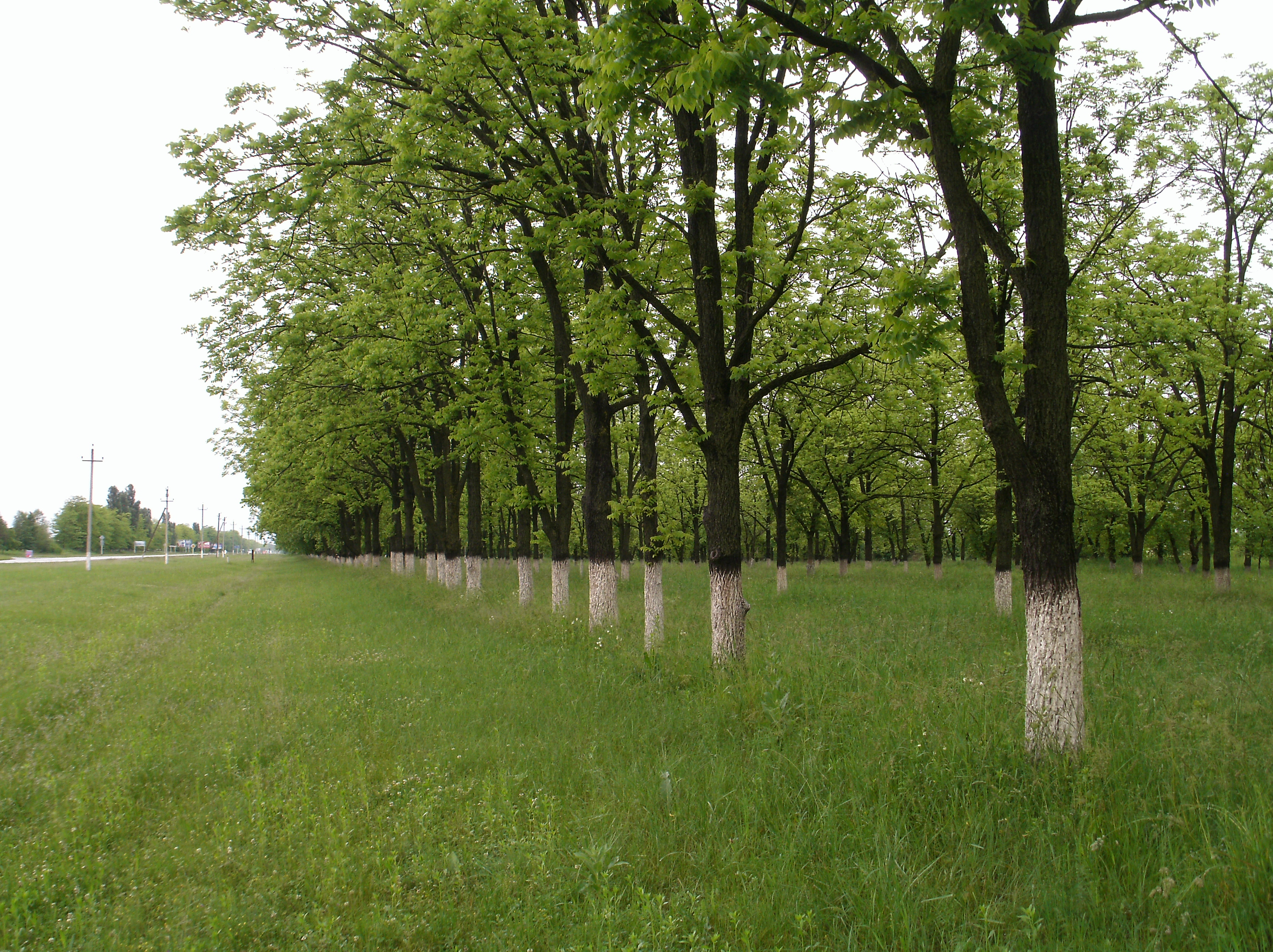

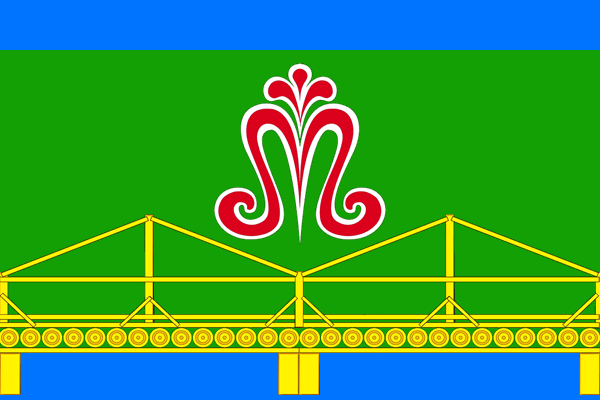
- Flag
- Interactive map of Mostovskoy
- Location of Mostovskoy Mostovskoy (European Russia) Mostovskoy (Russia)
- Coordinates: 44.400°N 40.767°E
- Country: Russia
- Federal subject: Krasnodar Krai
- Administrative district: Mostovsky District
- Founded: 1894
- Elevation: 383 m (1,257 ft)

Population (2010 Census)
  - Total: 25,075
  - Estimate (2025): 25,285 (+0.8%)
- Time zone: UTC+3 (MSK)
- Postal code: 352570
- OKTMO ID: 03633151051

Mostovskoy (Russian: Мостовско́й) is an urban locality (an urban-type settlement) and the administrative center of Mostovsky District of Krasnodar Krai, Russia, located on the left bank of the Laba River. Population: 25,062(2020), 25,075 (2010 census); 24,866 (2002 census); 19,348 (1989 Soviet census).

== History ==
It was founded in 1894 or 1895 as the village of Mostovoye (Мостовое) or Mostovskoye (Мостовское) on the land of the former auls whose former inhabitants moved to Turkey. According to the 1926 census, it had a population of 4,512, 60.6% Russian and 37.7% Ukrainian. It was granted urban-type settlement status and given its present name on October 10, 1961.

== Notable people ==
Association football player Roman Pavlyuchenko was born in Mostovskoy in 1981.
