= Kurganinsky District =

Kurganinsky District Курганинский район (Russian)
- District
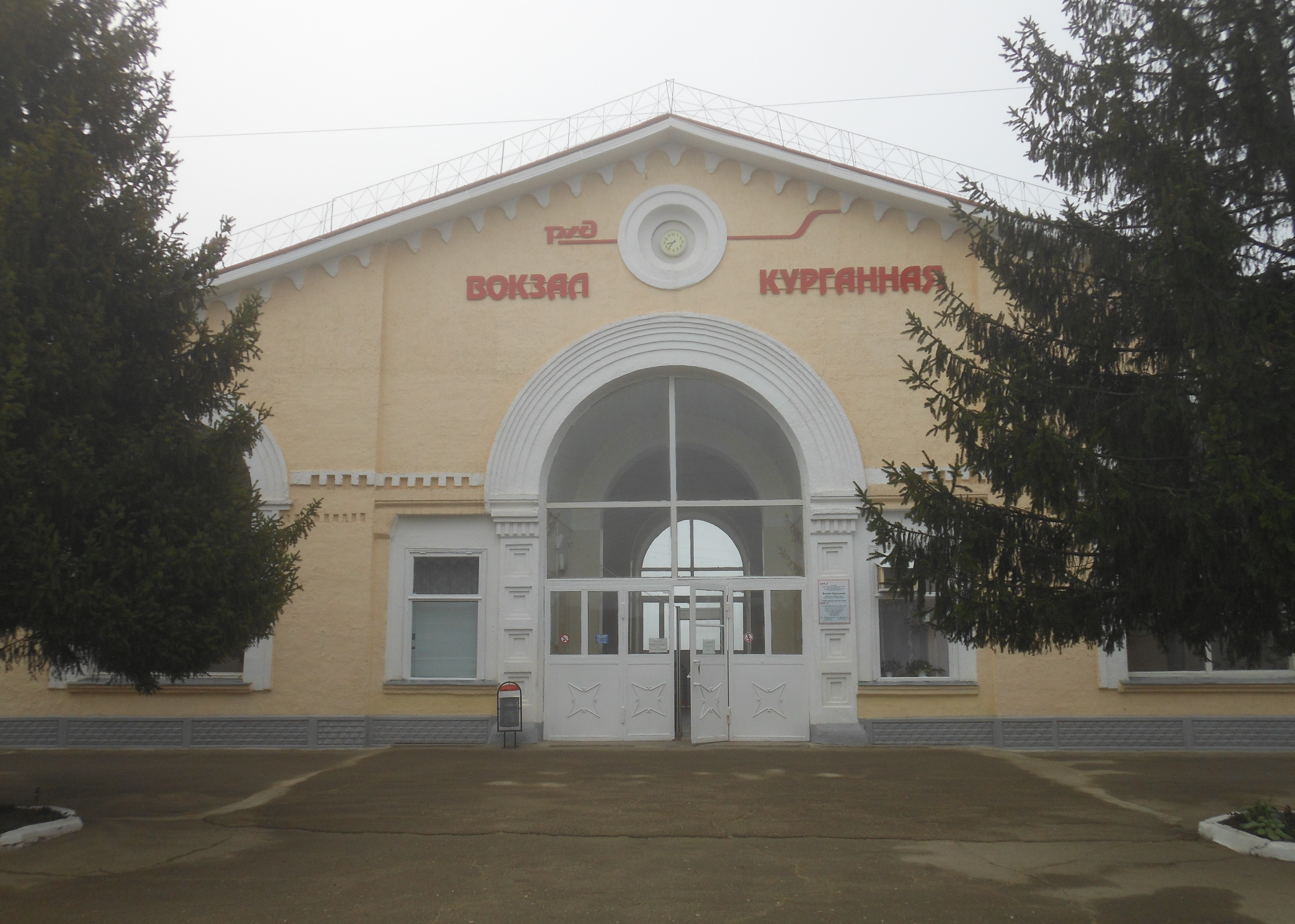
- Train station in Kurganinsk, Kurganinsky District

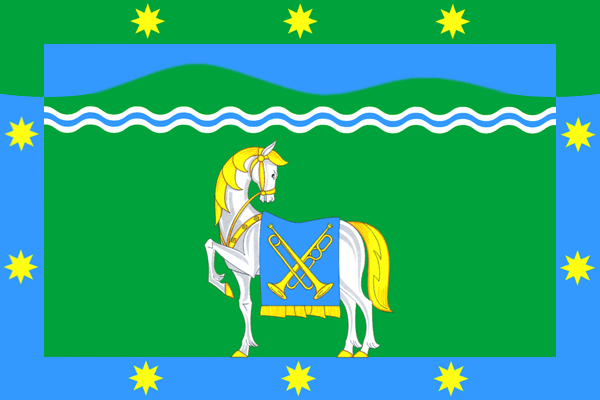
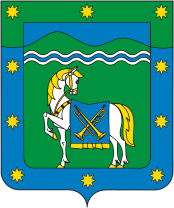
- Flag Coat of arms
- Location of Kurganinsky District in Krasnodar Krai
- Coordinates: 44°53′N 40°36′E
- Country: Russia
- Federal subject: Krasnodar Krai
- Established: 2 June 1924
- Administrative center: Kurganinsk

Area
  - Total: 1,590 km^{2} (610 sq mi)

Population (2010 Census)
  - Total: 103,036
  - Density: 64.8/km^{2} (168/sq mi)
  - Urban: 46.6%
  - Rural: 53.4%

Administrative structure
  - Administrative divisions: 1 Towns, 9 Rural okrugs
  - Inhabited localities: 1 cities/towns, 31 rural localities

Municipal structure
  - Municipally incorporated as: Kurganinsky Municipal District
  - Municipal divisions: 1 urban settlements, 9 rural settlements
- Time zone: UTC+3 (MSK)
- OKTMO ID: 03627000
- Website: http://www.admkurganinsk.ru/

Kurganinsky District (Russian: Курга́нинский райо́н) is an administrative district (raion), one of the thirty-eight in Krasnodar Krai, Russia. As a municipal division, it is incorporated as Kurganinsky Municipal District. It is located in the east of the krai. The area of the district is 1,590 square kilometers (610 sq mi). Its administrative center is the town of Kurganinsk.

== History ==
The district was formed on June 2, 1924 as part of South-East, Russian SFSR. Its structure included a part of the territory of the abolished Armavir department of the Kuban-Black Sea region. Since November 16, 1924, the district is part of the North Caucasus Krai. Since January 10, 1934, the district is part of the Azov-Black Sea Krai. The Temirgoevsky District was separated from the Kurganinsky District on December 31, 1934. On September 13, 1937, Kurganinsky district was the part of the Krasnodar Territory.

In 2005, rural administrations were abolished in the district and 10 municipalities were established.

== Population ==
103,036 (2010 census);[2] 103,999 (2002 census);[6] 93,811 (1989 Soviet census).[7] The population of Kurganinsk accounts for 46.6% of the district's total population.[2]

== See also ==
Administrative divisions of Krasnodar Krai
