= Krasnoselsky, Krasnodar Krai =

Krasnoselsky Красносельский
- Urban-type settlement
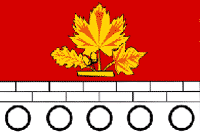
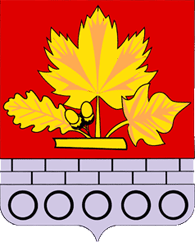
- Flag Coat of arms
- Interactive map of Krasnoselsky
- Location of Krasnoselsky Krasnoselsky (European Russia) Krasnoselsky (Russia)
- Coordinates: 45.3934°N 40.5991°E
- Country: Russia
- Federal subject: Krasnodar Krai
- Administrative district: Gulkevichsky District

Population (2010 Census)
  - Total: 7,792
  - Estimate (2023): 7,403 (−5%)
- Time zone: UTC+3 (MSK)
- Postal codes: 352188, 352189
- OKTMO ID: 03613162051

Krasnoselsky (Russian: Красносе́льский, until 1941: Zonnental, Russian: Зонненталь; German: Sonnental) is an urban locality (an urban-type settlement) in Gulkevichsky District of Krasnodar Krai, Russia. Population: 7,792 (2010 census); 7,462 (2002 census); 6,563 (1989 Soviet census).

According to the 1926 census, it had a population of 1,004, 99.4% German by ethnicity.
