= Boris Uspensky =

Russian painter

- Борис Успенский
- Born: July 12, 1927; Moscow, Soviet Union
- Died: September 28, 2005 (aged 78); Moscow, Russian Federation
- Education: Surikov Moscow Art Institute
- Style: Graphics painter
- Spouse: Marina Uspenskaya

Boris Aleksandrovich Uspensky (Russian: Борис Александрович Успенский; 12 July 1927 – 28 September 2005) was a Soviet and Russian poster and graphics painter.

== Biography ==
Boris Uspensky was born in Moscow. He studied in the Surikov Moscow Art Institute 1947–1953. In 1953 he became a member of the Union of Artists of the USSR. From 1985 he was Professor and Head of the Graphical Dep., Surikov Institute. In 1986 he became People's Artist of the USSR. From 1992 he was a full member of Russian Academy of Arts. Cavalier of the Order of Friendship (1997).

== Works ==
After graduation in 1953, he started a working partnership with fellow student Oleg Savostyuk. Their friendship and collaboration lasted for many years and proved to be successful, the two making a complete breakthrough in the poster genre by creating a new style inspired by the Russian folk art Lubok – brightly coloured stories, sometimes in a primitive style. "... The innovative feat of these two artists was that they returned the poster to life as a Work of Art after its death in the 1930s" (M. Lazarev). The artists worked mainly with the publishing houses Izogiz, Plakat, Sovietskaya Rossiya, and Sovietskii Khudozhnik, and in the famous creative workshop Agitplakat.

From the mid-1960s Uspensky and Savostyuk often traveled to Karelia, where they created several series of works: The Loggers of Karelia, Border Guards, and Karelia.

In the 1960s Uspensky started working with the Bolshoi Theatre in Moscow, where he was acquainted with the ballet choreographer Yuri Grigorovich and the dancer Vladimir Vasiliev. For the Ballet, Uspensky painted posters and drew illustrations for programmes and libretti, his first poster being Swan Lake for the ballet's tour of France in 1958. Over the next decades he worked on many ballets, including Petrushka, Spartacus, Angara, Ivan the Terrible, Leniniana (after Mayakovsky), Paganini, Chopeniana (les Sylphides), and Romeo and Juliet.

After seeing the life of the theatre from the inside, drawing sketches and recording impressions, Uspensky developed a life-long love for the art of ballet. He drew and painted ballerinas, danseurs and choreographers in a variety of situations - during and after rehearsals, at the barre, or resting, tired. He continuously returned to this theme in his work, exploring different media – oil, tempera, gouache, pencil, and silk screen prints.

The artist also loved the town of Tarusa, his father's birthplace, located on the banks of the river Oka. For hours he would admire the scenery, the vast expanses, the river in fog and rain, and the ancient trees.

Uspensky's first wife was prominent Moscow children's book illustrator Marina Uspenskaya.

== Bibliography ==
- G. Demosfenova, A. Nurok, N Shantyko. "The Soviet Political Poster" (In Russian), 1962
- Volya Lyakhov. "Oleg Savostyuk, Boris Uspensky", Monograph, 1974
- Klaus Bashik, Nina Baburina, "Reality of the Utopia", 2005
- "Boris Uspensky" – Masters of Soviet Art, volume 4 (In English and Russian). Gamborg Gallery, 2008
