= Chernomorsky, Seversky District, Krasnodar Krai =

Chernomorsky Черноморский
- Urban-type settlement
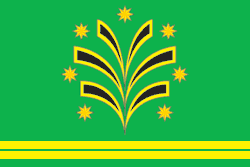
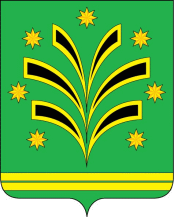
- Flag Coat of arms
- Interactive map of Chernomorsky
- Location of Chernomorsky Chernomorsky (Krasnodar Krai)
- Coordinates: 44°50′54″N 38°29′42″E
- Country: Russia
- Federal subject: Krasnodar Krai
- Administrative district: Seversky District
- Founded: 1946
- Elevation: 78 m (256 ft)

Population (2010 Census)
  - Total: 8,626
  - Estimate (2023): 8,504 (−1.4%)
- Time zone: UTC+3 (MSK)
- Postal code: 353266
- OKTMO ID: 03643158051

Chernomorsky (Russian: Черномо́рский) is an urban locality (an urban-type settlement) in Seversky District of Krasnodar Krai, Russia. Population: 8,626 (2010 census); 8,346 (2002 census); 8,398 (1989 Soviet census).
