= The Assumption Castle =

Estate castle near Moscow, Russia

Coordinates: 55°42′57″N 37°03′44″E

- Успенский замок
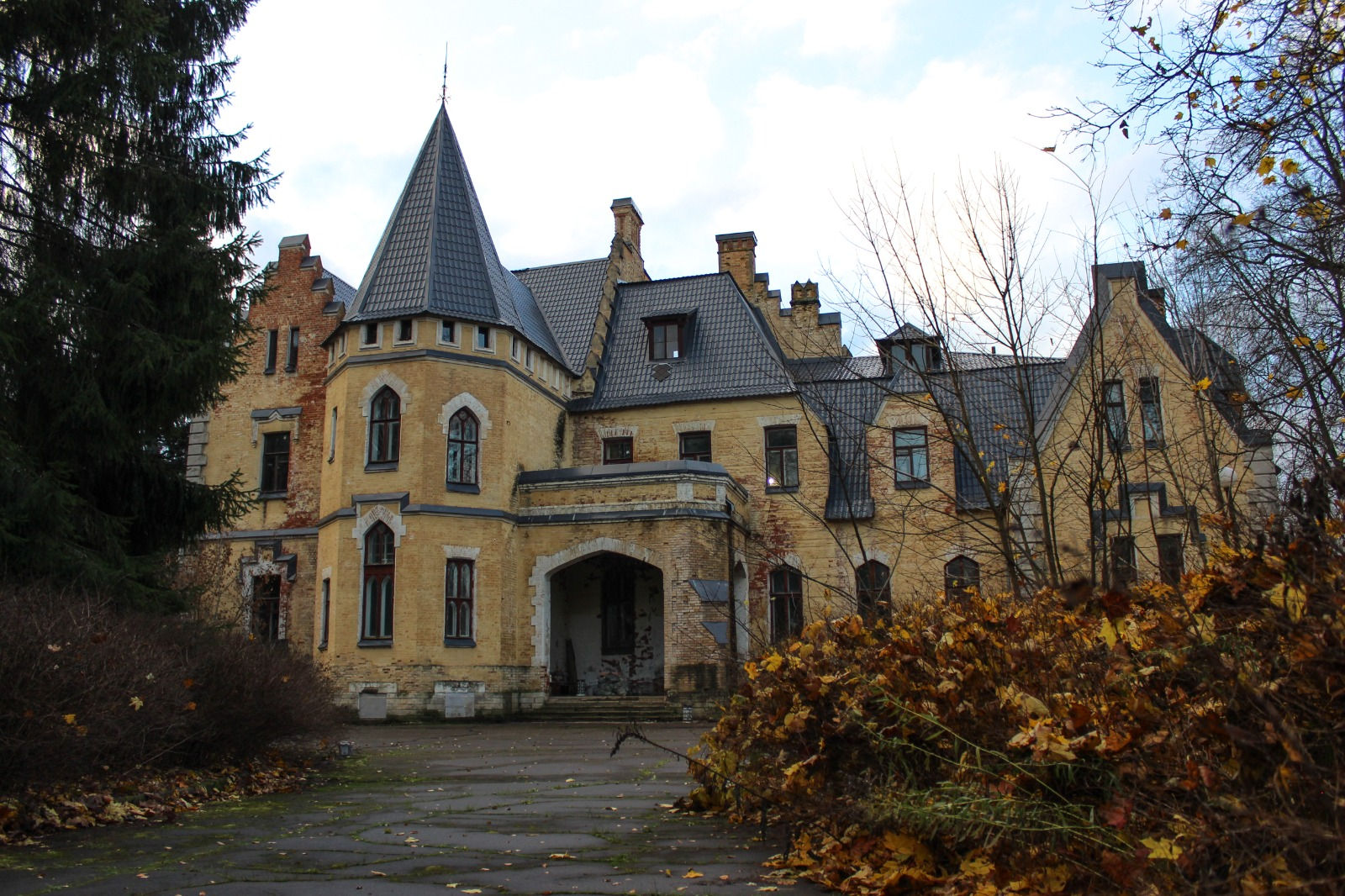

General information
- Status: Abandoned
- Type: Castle
- Location: Uspenskoye, Odintsovsky District, Moscow Oblast, Russia
- Year built: Mid 19th century

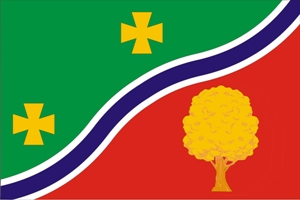
The flag of the rural settlement of Uspenskoye is registered in the State Heraldic Register of the Russian Federationwith the assigned registration number 4167

The Assumption Castle (Russian: Успенский замок) a castle is located 20 km from Moscow along the Rublyovo-Uspenskoye Highway.

The Assumption Castle is the main building of the estate "Uspenskoye," where in 1897 famous artist Isaac Levitan lived and writer Anton Chekhov frequently visited.

The castle is situated on a high cliff on the right bank of the Moskva River, within an ancient park, some oak trees of which are over 200 years old.

In 2022, the Assumption Castle was transferred to private ownership for the first time since its nationalization in 1917 as a result of a public competition won by the management company "Evocorp".

The Assumption Castle is protected as historical and cultural heritage.

== History ==
=== 1328 – 1917 ===
The lands around the Uspensky Castle have been inhabited since ancient times, as evidenced by archaeological finds from the Iron Age – a settlement and burial mounds.

The first written mention of the settlement dates back to 1328 as the personal property of Prince Ivan I Danilovich Kalita (Moscow prince 1322 or 1325 – 1340, Grand Prince of Vladimir 1328 – 1340, Prince of Novgorod 1328 – 1337). At that time, the settlement was called "Vyazemskoye."

By the mid-16th century, the landowners became the Boyars Ovtsyny.

During the Russo-Polish War of 1609 - 1618, the village was devastated and in 1624 was granted for service to the Tsar's noblemen Boris and Gleb Morozov.

Boris Ivanovich Morozov was the tutor and favorite of Tsar Alexei Mikhailovich and later married the sister of the Tsaritsa, Anna Miloslavskaya.

Gleb Ivanovich Morozov became the husband of Fyodosiya Sokovnina, the famous "Boyarina Morozova", depicted in the painting by V.I. Surikov.

After the Morozov family died out, their land holdings were distributed among the close associates of Tsar Alexei Mikhailovich, and Uspenskoye passed into the ownership of the Apraxin family, who erected initially a wooden and then a stone church in the village, consecrated in 1729.

By the end of the 18th century, there was a wooden manor house with a fruit garden on the estate.

At the very beginning of the 19th century, Uspenskoye was bought by Irina Ivanovna Beketova, the widow of Colonel Pyotr Afanasyevich Beketov (the son of the Simbirsk governor Afanasy Alekseevich Beketov and the brother of Nikita Afanasyevich Beketov, general-lieutenant, governor of Astrakhan (1763 – 1780), favorite of Empress Elizabeth Petrovna). In the same 1812, maneuvering and delaying the enemy troops' movement, the detachment of General F.F. Winzingerode, a hero of the Patriotic War, retreated to Moscow from Uspenskoe. After the Patriotic War of 1812, the estate continued to be owned by the heirs of I.I. Beketova, while the manor house was being rebuilt. In 1880, the Uspenskoe estate was purchased by Vera Alexandrovna Arapova (1842-1890), the wife of Nikolai Ustinovich Arapov (1825-1884), the Moscow chief of police, a lieutenant general for 92,500 rubles. Vera Alexandrovna was the daughter of Major General Alexander Borisovich Kazakov, who became a senator in 1870 and received the title of privy councillor in 1875.

A.B. Kazakov had been married since 1843 to Sofia Nikolaevna Demidova, the daughter of a privy councillor and a representative of the renowned Demidov family, descendants of Akinfiy Nikitich Demidov, owner of the Ural factories in the first half of the 18th century.

The house of A.B. Kazakov was located on Kudrinskaya Square in Moscow. In the wing of his estate, the museum of Pyotr Ilyich Tchaikovskyis currently located. The composer lived there from September 1, 1872, to November 1873.

General Kazakov in the mid-19th century was one of the first to recognize the value of local natural landscapes; being the owner of the village of Podushkino, he also purchased land near the village of Barvikha and built a resort settlement there, which brought him considerable income from the sale and rental of houses.

Notably, it was specifically for A.B. Kazakov's daughters – Vera and Nadezhda (who later married Baron Mayendorf) – that the outstanding architect Pyotr Samoilovich Boytsovdeveloped designs for two famous castles – the Uspensky Castle and the Mayendorf Castlein the Barvikha area, on Podushkinskoye Highway.

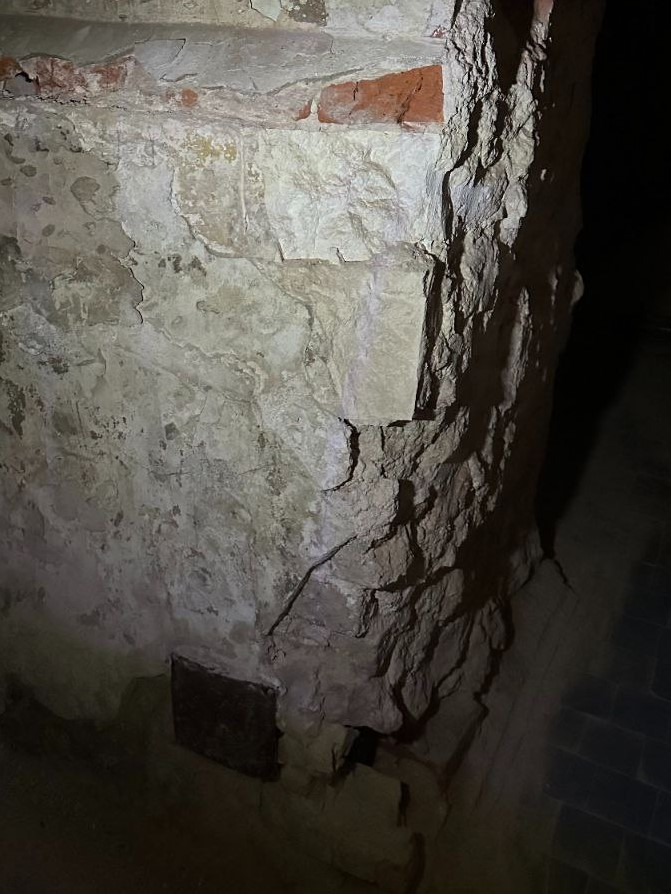
Fragment of the ancient foundation.

At the same time, the Uspensky Castle effectively became a reinterpretation of the old manor house, fragments of which still remain at the base of the castle.

In 1885 Vera Alexandrovna married Boris Vladimirovich Svyatopolk-Chetvertinsky, a representative of a noble Polish family.

In the same period, close to A.B. Kazakov's house on Kudrinskaya Square, another city mansion was built according to Boytsov's design - the famous building on Povarskaya Street, which became known as the Svyatopolk-Chetvertinsky Mansion, the place where meetings of Moscow Masons were held in the late 19th and early 20th centuries, and which later became, which it is to this day.

After Vera Alexandrovna's death in 1890, her relatives, in particular her sister Nadezhda Alexandrovna (Verigina by her first marriage, Mayendorf by her second), who lived nearby, became concerned about the guardianship of the property of Vera Alexandrovna's two daughters.

The husband of Nadezhda Alexandrovna - Evgeny Alexandrovich Verigin (colonel, chief of staff of the 2nd Grenadier Division) in those years was acting as a leader of the nobility of Zvenigorod district. The guardianship of Nadezhda Alexandrovna over 18-year-old Anastasia and 16-year-old Sofia was established. Later, the Uspensky castle was given to Vera Alexandrovna's eldest daughter Anastasia Nikolaevna, who became the wife of Baron Carl Gustav Mannerheim(1867-1951) in 1892.

In 1894 the Uspensky Castle was purchased by a representative of a famous dynasty of Old Believer merchants, philanthropist and patron of the arts - Sergei Timofeyevich Morozov, brother of the famous Savva Morozov.

Sergey T. Morozov paid 230 thousand rubles in silver for Baroness Mannerheim's possessions.

Sergei T. Morozov lived in Uspensky Castle during the summer and for several years, at his invitation, the painter Isaak Ilyich Levitan stayed at the castle for long periods of time.

Levitan painted several paintings here, including a depiction of the Uspensky Castle. n 1897 Anton Pavlovich Chekhovcame to the Uspensky Castle at Levitan's invitation.

=== 1917 – 2022 ===
After the October Revolution and until 1929 the Uspenskoe estate housed an orphanage, then the Horse Breeding Institute, and since 1934 a school.

In 1941-1942 the castle temporarily housed a military hospital.

From 1943 to 1955 the castle again housed the Institute of Horse Breeding.

From 1955 - the Institute of Forestry.

In 1960 the castle was assigned to the Central Clinical Hospital of the Academy of Sciences of the USSR.

In the early 1970s, according to the project developed by the workshop No. 1 of the GIPRONII of the USSR Academy of Sciences under the direction of Andrei Shchusev, a new hospital building was built on the territory of the castle park, connected to the castle, including an underground passage.

The hospital was located on the territory of the estate until 2014.

From 2014 to 2022, the complex was mothballed and not maintained, which could not but negatively affect its condition.

In 2022, a tender was announced for the acquisition of the property complex, which included the Uspensky Castle.

=== 2022 – current time ===
As a result of an open tender, the Estate, including the Uspensky Castle, was for the first time since 1917 transferred to private ownership - the Evokorp Management Company.

After acquiring the castle, the new owner organized works on preservation of the cultural heritage object, carrying out a set of emergency rescue works protecting the castle from leaks and destruction.

The territory of the park was cleared of construction and other garbage, collapsed trees were removed.

Restorers and art historians carried out historical, archival and bibliographic research and established new circumstances and facts related to the Uspensky Castle.

Restorers carried out surveys of the castle's structures and surfaces, laser scanning, pits and probes, realized engineering and chemical and technological (including mycological) studies, surveyed engineering networks.

Ultrasonic research was carried out, as a result of which preserved heating ducts were found in the castle walls. According to the design of P.S. Boytsov and historical engineering solutions, the air in the castle was heated by furnaces and then flowed into the rooms through the channels. The restoration project includes partial restoration of the 19th century heating system.

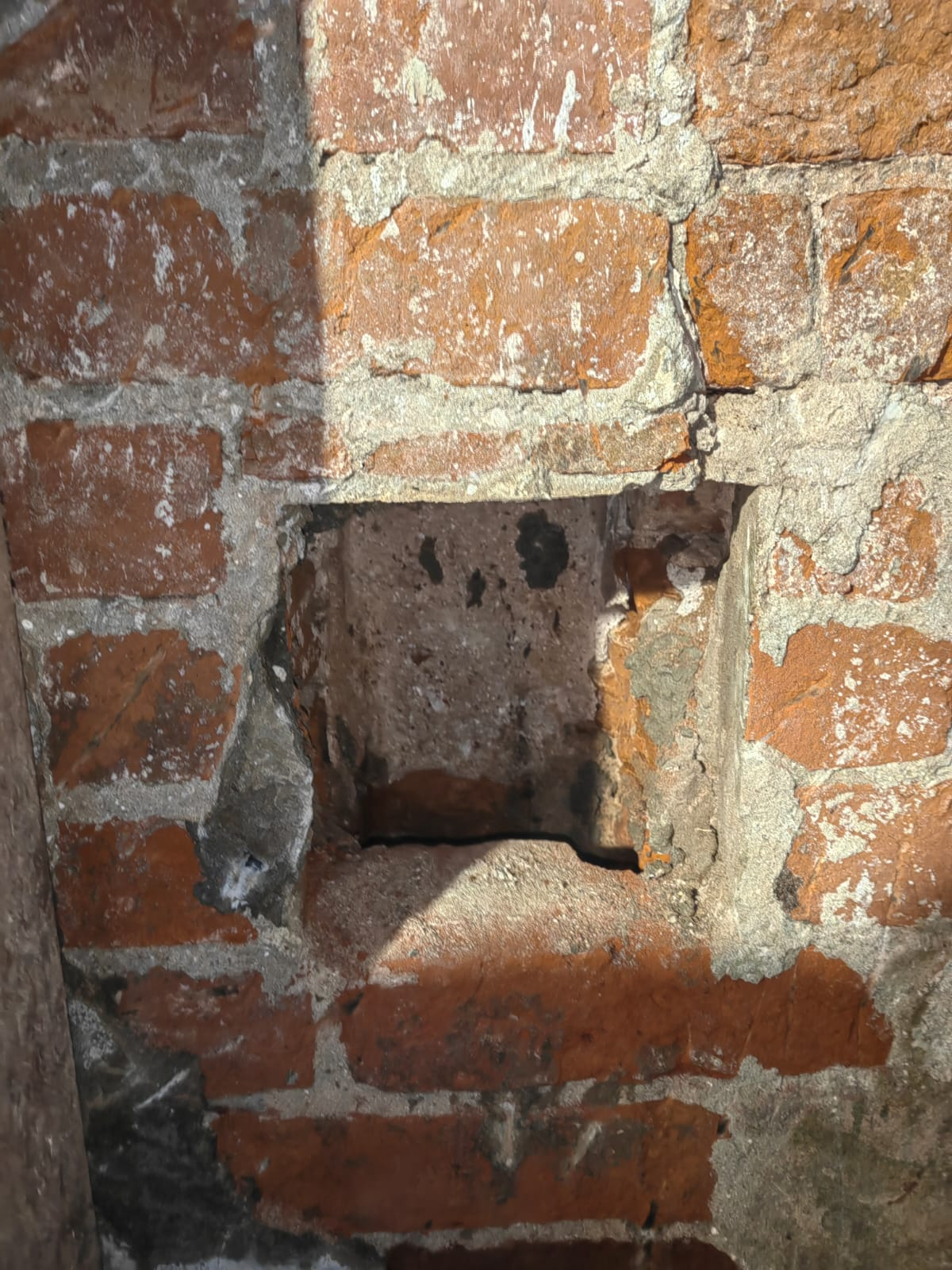
One of the surviving heating ducts.

A draft of the boundaries and the mode of use of the territory of the cultural heritage site were developed and approved. The subject of protection has been developed and approved. It was announced that the library of the Investment Programs Fund will be located in the Assumption Castle.

At the end of May 2024, a competition was announced for the development of a socio-cultural concept for the development of the Uspenskoye estate, in order to collect a wide range of ideas and views for the creation of a new center of attraction, including through the modernization of the 1970s building located in the park.

The competition was organized by Dom.rf.

== Architecture of the castle ==
The Assumption Castle was erected according to the project of P.S. Boytsov.

The two-storey castle is close in its architectural solutions to other projects of P.S. Boytsov, in particular, there are similarities with the Mayendorf Castle and with the interiors of the Central House of Writers on Povarskaya Street in Moscow.

The castle is an original example of stylization in the spirit of Art Nouveau of architectural motifs of the Northern Gothic.

The main planning axis of the estate runs along the main eastern facade of the castle, and an access alley is traced to the main entrance.

The castle stands on the crest of a high hill, along the slope of which a parterre descends to the river.

The castle has a complex stepped asymmetrical volumetric and spatial composition, built on a combination of volumes of different heights with attics and high roofs.

The volume of the building is made of clay red brick, the outer walls are lined with ceramic bricks of light gray-yellow color.

Decorative details are made of brick with partial use of white stone.

The walls are decorated by P.S. Boytsov with patterns of rhombuses and crosses carved in brickwork.

The composition of the main (eastern) facade is complicated by a two-storey faceted volume of the protrusive tower. The staircase tower, with battlements, is completed by a high tent with a spire, which is the main vertical accent of the castle. Next to the staircase tower there is a low ledge of the porch of the main entrance with a single-staircase of five steps and a covered platform. Above the porch there is a balcony-terrace.

The western facade, overlooking the river, has a composition of different heights. The center of the western facade is complicated by a faceted bay window with a balcony-terrace.

The southern facade of the building is a side facade, its western part is highlighted by a high risalit with a gable top.

The northern facade of the building is lateral, has no protruding parts.

The abundance of high gable pediments and peaked roofs creates a Gothic silhouette of the building. Steep triangular and stepped tongs complete the individual elements of the building. The gables are decorated with stepped and serrated parapets. Stepped firewalls with pipes from internal chimneys run along and across the roofs of the building.

The roof of the castle is of a complex mansard shape.

The interiors of the castle are decorated with wooden panels and portals in the Gothic style.

== Sources ==
=== Sources from archives ===
- Russian State Archive of Ancient Acts (RGADA, F. 1320, F. 1354, F. 1355).
- Russian State Military Historical Archive (RGMHA, F. 386, F. 2000).
- Russian State Archive of Economics (RGAE, F. 478).
- Central State Archive of the Moscow Region (TsGADA, F. 3767, F. 4997).
- Central State Archive of the City of Moscow (Central State Archive of Moscow, OKhD do 1917, F. 49, F. 98, F. 184, F. 203, F. 210, F. 357, F. 454, F. 608, F. 952).
- Tsarskoye Selo Museum-Reserve.
- Shchusev Museum of Architecture.
- Scientific Archive of the Main Department of Cultural Heritage of the Moscow Region.

== Bibliography ==
- Bautdinov G. Morozovs: Entrepreneurs and Philanthropists. Moscow, 2017.
- Blumin G.Z. Tsarskaya doroga [The Tsar's Road]. Moscow, b.g.
- Borovkova S. Zvenigorod and surroundings. Moscow, 1982.
- Borovkova S.N. Zapovednaya Zvenigorodskaya zemlya [Reserved Zvenigorod land]. Moscow, 1982.
- Around Moscow. Excursions. Moscow, 1930.
- Zavyalov A. Dom – kak Vatican: Uspenskoe – v gaz. "Moskovskaya Pravda", 1998, May 20.
- Zvenigorod. Historical and cultural monuments of the Zvenigorod region. Moscow, 1974.
- Zvenigorod. Statistical and Economic Collection. Zvenigorod, 1924.
- Architects of Moscow in the Time of Eclecticism, Art Nouveau and Neoclassicism (1830s – 1917). Moscow, 1998.
- Historical and cultural monuments of the Zvenigorod district. Zvenigorod, 1957.
- Kazhdan T.P. Some Features of the Merchant Estate of the Beginning of the XX Century – in the collection "Russian Estate", iss. 2., Moscow, 1996.
- Kazhdan T.P. K voprosu o tipologii podmoskovnoy kupecheskoy usadmy poslednej chetverti XIX – nachala XX vv. – V sb. «Russkaya usadba», vyp. 5, Moscow, 1999.
- Kovalev-Sluchevsky K.P. Drugaya Rublevka [The Other Rublevka]. Secrets of the Tsar's Path: A virtual journey through time and space. Moscow, 2009.
- Krasheninnikov A.F. Moskovskiy zodchiy Pyotr Samoilovich Boytsov – in the collection "Maryino: Orthodox Historical and Local Lore Almanac. Vol. 5, Moscow, 2000.
- The Morozov merchants are Moscow entrepreneurs and patrons of the arts. Moscow, 1997.
- Kusov V.G. Zemli Moskovskoy gubernii v XVIII v. T. 1, M., 2004.
- Leonid (archim.). Moscow Zvenigorod and its district in ecclesiastical and archaeological terms. – In the collection "Antiquities. Proceedings of the Commission for the Preservation of Ancient Monuments of the Imperial Moscow Archaeological Society". Vol. 7, Moscow, 1878.
- Livshits A.S., Mitronov N.N., Fomin S.V. Uspenskoye. – in the collection "History of Villages and Villages of the Moscow Region of the XIV-XX Centuries", issue. 7, Moscow, 1994.
- Livshits A.S., Mitronov N.N., Fomin S.V. Uspenskoe [Uspenskoye]. – in the coll. "Odintsovo Land". Moscow, 1994.
- Mamontova N.N. Sergey Timofeevich Morozov and the Moscow Handicraft Museum. – In the collection "The First Morozov Readings". Collection of reports. – Noginsk, 1996.
- Mukhovitskaya L. Morozovy – Moskovskie predprinimateli i metsenaty [Morozovs – Moscow Entrepreneurs and Patrons]. Moscow, 2015.
- Inhabited areas of the Moscow province. Moscow, 1913.
- Nashchokina M.V. Architects of Moscow Art Nouveau. M.
- Nashchokina M.V. Architect P.S. Boytsov. Moscow, 2016.
- Nashchokina M.V. Pyotr Boytsov [Pyotr Boytsov]. Moscow, 2019.
- Nistrem K. Pokazitel seleniy i zhitel' uyezdov Moskovskoy gubernii [Index of villages and residents of the districts of the Moscow province]. Moscow, 1852.
- Architectural monuments of the Moscow region. Vol. 2, Moscow, 1975.
- Land books of inhabited and uninhabited places of the Moscow province. Moscow, 1865.
- Russian Bibliographic Dictionary. Vol. 2, p. 115. Apraksins.
- Savinova E.N. Selskie usadby moskovskikh predprinimatel'stva kontsa XIX nachala XX vv. M., 2008.
- Lists of populated places of the Moscow province. St. Petersburg, 1862. No 2641 – Uspenskoye.
- Ulyanova G.N. Charity of Moscow entrepreneurs. 1860‒1914. Moscow, 1999.
- Fedorov-Davydov A.A. Isaak Ilyich Levitan: Life and Work 1860-1900, Iskusstvo Publishing House, 1976.
- Filatkina N.A. Morozovskie podmoskovnye po vospominaniam poslednykh vladnikov [Morozovskie podmoskovnye po vospominaniam poslednikam poslednikh vladnikov]. – In the coll. "Russian Estate", iss. 10 (26). Moscow, 2004.
- Kholmogorov V.I. i G.I. Istoricheskie materialy o tserkvakh i selakh XVIXVIII stoletiy [Historical materials about churches and villages of the XVIXVIII centuries]. Vol. 2. Zvenigorod desyatina. Moscow, 1882.
- Chizhkov A.B. Russkaya usadba [Russian estate]. Moscow, 2005.
- Shepovalov T. On the rivers and lakes of the Moscow region. Moscow, 1960.
- Shramchenko A.P. Spravochnaya knizhka Moskovskoy gubernii (opisanie uyezdov) [Reference book of the Moscow province (description of districts)]. Moscow, 1890.
- Encyclopedia of Villages and Towns of the Moscow Area. Odintsovo Land. M., 1994
