= Krasnoye Selo, Vologda Oblast =

Krasnoye Selo Красное Село
- Village
- Location within Vologda Oblast Location within Russia
- Coordinates: 60°02′N 46°07′E
- Country: Russia
- Region: Vologda Oblast
- District: Kichmengsko-Gorodetsky District
- Time zone: UTC+3:00

Krasnoye Selo (Russian: Красное Село) is a rural locality (a village) in Kichmegnskoye Rural Settlement, Kichmengsko-Gorodetsky District, Vologda Oblast, Russia. The population was 6 as of 2002.

== Geography ==
Krasnoye Selo is located 22 km northeast of Kichmengsky Gorodok (the district's administrative centre) by road. Pogudino is the nearest rural locality.
