= Uspenskoye, Voronezh Oblast =

Uspenskoye Успенское
- Selo
- Location within Voronezh Oblast Location within Russia
- Coordinates: 50°57′N 39°10′E
- Country: Russia
- Region: Voronezh Oblast
- District: Ostrogozhsky District
- Time zone: UTC+3:00

Uspenskoye (Russian: Успенское) is a rural locality (a selo) in Korotoyakskoye Rural Settlement, Ostrogozhsky District, Voronezh Oblast, Russia. The population was 257 as of 2010. There are 2 streets.

== Geography ==
Uspenskoye is located 21 km northeast of Ostrogozhsk (the district's administrative centre) by road. Pokrovka is the nearest rural locality.
