= Kris Kaspersky =

Russian hacker, IT security researcher (1976-2017)

- Крис Касперски
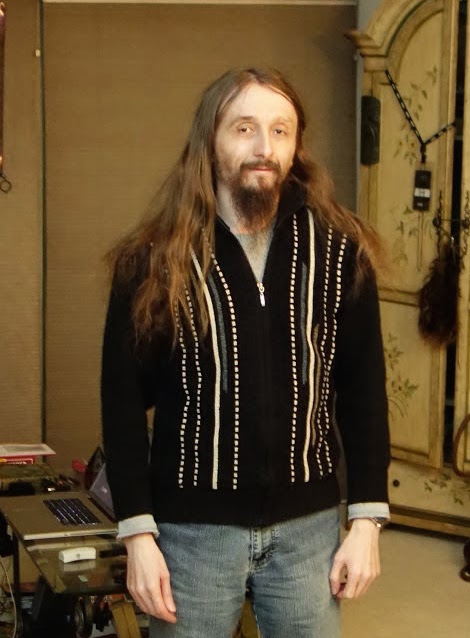
- Kris Kaspersky in 2014
- Born: Nikolay Likhachev; November 2, 1976 village Uspenskoye, Krasnodar Krai, Russia
- Died: February 18, 2017 (aged 40); Daytona Beach, Florida, United States
- Citizenship: Russia
- Occupations: Journalist, technical writer, hacker
- Writing career
- Pen name: Kris Kaspersky, myschh, visual-sex-ltd, KPNC, nezumi, elraton, souriz, tikus, muss, farah and jardon
- Genre: Computer literature

Kris Kaspersky (born Nikolay Likhachev, November 2, 1976 – February 18, 2017) was a Russian hacker, (Note: meaning not a cracker but a person interested in research of programmable systems) writer and IT security researcher.

== Early years ==
Kris Kaspersky was born on November 2, 1976, in the village of Uspenskoye, Krasnodar Krai, and at birth was named Nikolay. Being just a few weeks old he suffered a brain stroke, which came as a result of injection of calcium chloride, mistakenly made by a doctor. Brain tissue was partly damaged leading to minor autism. At the age of seven he made his first working radio. While studying at the elementary school he owned his first computer – Pravetz 8D, Bulgarian clone of British Oric Atmos with the documentation in Bulgarian language. The computer required connection to a tape recorder and a color TV set. For this computer Nikolay developed his first computer game.

Two symbols, 0 and >, standing close to each other represented a fish. The fish was running across the screen back and forth. In the center of the screen, there was a question mark sign, which stood for fisherman. To catch the fish, player needed to press space bar.

His next computer, Electronika BK-0010, helped Kris to master assembly. The third computer was ZX Spectrum, the fourth one was Agat. Except for his birthday, Kris does not remember exact dates and chronology of events, he reconstructs them based on computer models he had at various periods of his life.

He graduated from high school with a silver medal. Kris was a good student, and there were only excellent marks in his certificate, however, according to Kris, to get a gold medal one needed to give bribes to local officials. He entered Taganrog University of Radio Engineering with a specialization in "Design of microcontrollers" without entrance exam. Although he went down without taking even first end-of-semester exams because "students hardly had a possibility to program" and returned to his native village. In the next year, he entered the university again "to calm mom" and again he went down. In those years Kris had IBM PC with 20 mb disk and color monitor. In cooperation with student Shurik, they organized a service of system administration in Taganrog. Some time later his companion absconded with the money. Kris Kaspersky had to give the remaining money and the computer to racketeers and returned to the native village to his parents.

Then Kris made attempts to reopen the business with a trader from Armavir, took trips to Krasnodar and Rostov. Finally, Kris ended up in the capital.

"And one day in Moscow, in the stairwell, which served for the employees of the smoking room, there was a historic and unique meeting between the two Kaspersky's. Chris came to Eugene Kaspersky's antivirus lab and suggested a couple of ideas, but cooperation failed: "I don't know why, but as soon as the lab talks about me, they immediately get in a bad mood. Now they're spreading rumors that I worked for them for three weeks, they took me in for a laugh, and then threw me out. Now Kaspersky and I are on parallel planes, I do not interfere with his business, and he does not interfere with mine. I even removed the "Y" from my pseudonym on purpose, so that we wouldn't be confused. But he still does not like me."”

== Publications ==
The first article written by Kris was published when he was still in school. It was published by "Astrologer” magazine, and the article itself was devoted to astronomy. In 1998 Kris began to contribute actively to conferences of FidoNet RU.HACKER. Dmitry Sadchenko noted his posts and arranged him a meeting with the representatives of publishing house "Solon-Press". In 1999 "Solon-Press" published the first book of Kris Kaspersky "Technique and philosophy of hacker attacks" with 50 000 rubles of author's fee. Desktop publisher specialist Sergey Tarasov recalls:

"First time he came accompanied by his father – afterwards we began to publish his electrical engineering handbooks too. Kris was a good writer and conversation partner, and what is most important, had no quirks and excessive self-importance. His head worked incredibly well – he literally programmed in mind."

A total of 16 books had been published by 2008, including several translations into English. The books were dedicated to data protection and program optimization, computer virus and disassembling. Among these books there's also "Weatherlore Encyclopedia". Kris's interest lies in the field of computers and astronomy. Some of his articles and forum topics concern telescopes and observation of the starry sky. Along with the books Kris contributes to such magazines as "System administrator", "Byte", "Astrologer", "Hacker". The chief editor of "Hacker" magazine Nikita Kislitsin said:

"Neither me nor anybody else from editorial staff have seen him in person. We communicate by mail and telephone. He is a maniacally enthusiastic person, one can always address him with a request: "We need to reverse engineer WM Keeper, to understand what it's spying upon a PC, and write a 25 kilobytes article about it until tomorrow morning."”

Recently Kris Kaspersky expressed the idea to leave Russia. And, in order to increase the audience, to start writing books originally in English. Besides Kris Kaspersky had started his English blog. In late October 2008 he made a presentation on a fundamentally new holes in Intel processors, suitable for remote capture of multiple servers at a conference Hack in the Box in Kuala Lumpur.

== Endeavor Security and McAfee ==
Until recently Kris Kaspersky lived an isolated way of life in his native village. Since June 2008, he worked remotely on Endeavor Security, engaged in security of computers and networks. In 2009, McAfee acquired Endeavor Security.

"Kris knows the answer to the main question concerning security – he knows the way it works, – says CEO of the company Christopher Jordan. – Besides, he can instantly give rise to a new idea." “His fame outside Russia is not exaggerated – says another Endeavor employee Alice Chang – he's a very well-known hacker, in the original sense of the word: a man who understands the very basics of how it works."

Since 2008 Kris has been living and working in the United States. He worked for Check Point as a security expert.

== Injury and death ==
On February 10, 2017, Kris Kaspersky (Nikolay Likhachev) was critically injured in a hard landing after sky diving: "A sky diver who took a hard landing at Skydive DeLand remains in intensive care and is unable to communicate, a nurse at Halifax Health Medical Center said Monday. The sky diver, 40-year-old Nikolay Likhachev, suffered a compound fracture to his left leg and a head injury, an incident report released Monday by DeLand police states. The report states that Likhachev had completed 200 jumps, most of them at Skydive DeLand. Likhachev […] was injured Friday just before 9:15 a.m."

Kris Kaspersky was taken off life support and died from his wounds a week later on February 18, 2017.

== Bibliography ==
- Technique and philosophy of hacker attacks. ISBN 5-93455-015-2
- Thought pattern – IDA disassembler. ISBN 5-93455-093-4
- Technique of network attacks. ISBN 5-93455-078-0
- Fundamental principles of hacking. Inverse assembling mastership. ISBN 5-93455-175-2
- Sketch-book of a computer virus researcher. ISBN 5-469-00331-0
- Weather lore encyclopedia. Predicting weather by local signes
- Hacker Disassembling Uncovered, ISBN 978-1-931769-46-4
- Shellcoder's Programming Uncovered, ISBN 978-1-931769-46-4
- Data Recovery Tips & Solutions: Windows, Linux, and BSD, ISBN 978-1-931769-56-3
- CD Cracking Uncovered Protection Against Unsanctioned, ISBN 978-81-7008-818-9
- CD Cracking Uncovered: Protection Against Unsanctioned CD Copying, ISBN 978-1-931769-33-4
- Hacker Debugging Uncovered, ISBN 978-1-931769-40-2
- Code Optimization: Effective Memory Usage, ISBN 978-1-931769-24-2

=== Magazines, to which Kris Kaspersky contributed ===
- «BYTE Russia»
- «System administrator»
- «Hacker»
- «Hacker-specialist»
- «IT specialist»
- «Programmer»
- «Computerra»
- «Mobi»

== See also ==
- Assembler
- Programmer
- Hacker
