= Tikhoretsky District =

Tikhoretsky District Тихорецкий район (Russian)
- District
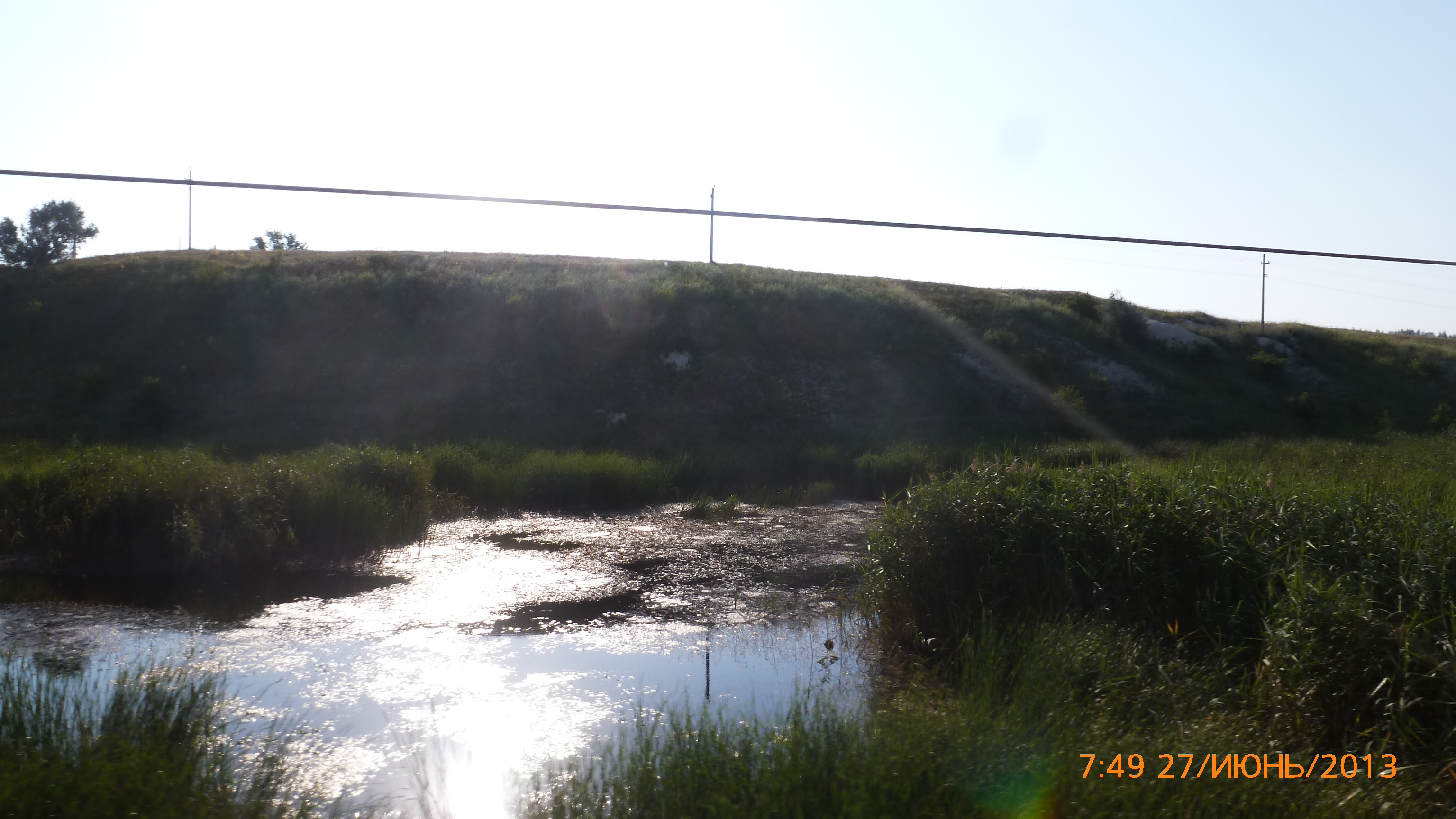
- Riverbank in Tikhoretsky District

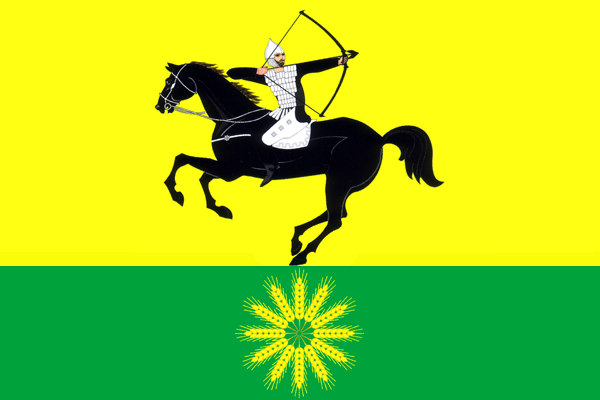
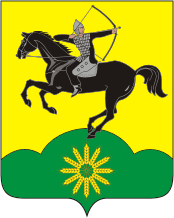
- Flag Coat of arms
- Location of Tikhoretsky District in Krasnodar Krai
- Coordinates: 45°54′N 40°06′E
- Country: Russia
- Federal subject: Krasnodar Krai
- Established: 2 June 1924
- Administrative center: Tikhoretsk

Area
  - Total: 1,825.4 km^{2} (704.8 sq mi)

Population (2010 Census)
  - Total: 59,106
  - Density: 32.380/km^{2} (83.863/sq mi)
  - Urban: 0%
  - Rural: 100%

Administrative structure
  - Administrative divisions: 11 Rural okrugs
  - Inhabited localities: 57 rural localities

Municipal structure
  - Municipally incorporated as: Tikhoretsky Municipal District
  - Municipal divisions: 1 urban settlements, 12 rural settlements
- Time zone: UTC+3 (MSK)
- OKTMO ID: 03654000
- Website: http://admin-tih.ru/

Tikhoretsky District (Russian: Тихоре́цкий райо́н) is an administrative district (raion), one of the thirty-eight in Krasnodar Krai, Russia. As a municipal division, it is incorporated as Tikhoretsky Municipal District. It is located in the northeastern central part of the krai. The area of the district is 1,825.4 square kilometers (704.8 sq mi). Its administrative center is the town of Tikhoretsk (which is not administratively a part of the district). Population: 59,106 (2010 census); 61,232 (2002 census); 58,739 (1989 Soviet census).

== Administrative and municipal status ==
Within the framework of administrative divisions, Tikhoretsky District is one of the thirty-eight in the krai. The town of Tikhoretsk serves as its administrative center, despite being incorporated separately as an administrative unit with the status equal to that of the districts (and which, in addition to Tikhoretsk, also includes two rural localities).

As a municipal division, the district is incorporated as Tikhoretsky Municipal District, with the Town of Tikhoretsk being incorporated within it as Tikhoretskoye Urban Settlement.
