= Priozerny, Ust-Kalmansky District, Altai Krai =

Priozerny Приозёрный
- Settlement
- Location within Altai Krai Location within Russia
- Coordinates: 52°09′N 83°29′E
- Country: Russia
- Region: Altai Krai
- District: Ust-Kalmansky District
- Time zone: UTC+7:00

Priozerny (Russian: Приозёрный) is a rural locality (a settlement) and the administrative center of Priozyorny Selsoviet, Ust-Kalmansky District, Altai Krai, Russia. The population was 371 as of 2013. There are 9 streets.

== Geography ==
Priozerny is located 15 km east of Ust-Kalmanka (the district's administrative centre) by road. Ust-Kalmanka is the nearest rural locality.
