= Priozerny, Vladimir Oblast =

Priozerny Приозёрный
- Settlement
- Location within Vladimir Oblast Location within Russia
- Coordinates: 56°08′N 41°58′E
- Country: Russia
- Region: Vladimir Oblast
- District: Vyaznikovsky District
- Time zone: UTC+3:00

Priozerny (Russian: Приозёрный) is a rural locality (a settlement) in Posyolok Nikologory, Vyaznikovsky District, Vladimir Oblast, Russia. The population was 659 as of 2010. There are 10 streets.

== Geography ==
Priozerny is located 22 km southwest of Vyazniki (the district's administrative centre) by road. Nikologory is the nearest rural locality.
