= Uspenskoye, Kaduysky District, Vologda Oblast =

Uspenskoye Успенское
- Selo
- Location within Vologda Oblast Location within Russia
- Coordinates: 59°29′N 36°36′E
- Country: Russia
- Region: Vologda Oblast
- District: Kaduysky District
- Time zone: UTC+3:00

Uspenskoye (Russian: Успенское) is a rural locality (a selo) in Semizerye Rural Settlement, Kaduysky District, Vologda Oblast, Russia. The population was 14 as of 2002.

== Geography ==
Uspenskoye is located 60 km northwest of Kaduy (the district's administrative centre) by road. Zaruchevye is the nearest rural locality.
