= Priozerny, Rubtsovsky District, Altai Krai =

Priozerny Приозёрный
- Settlement
- Location within Altai Krai Location within Russia
- Coordinates: 51°34′N 81°12′E
- Country: Russia
- Region: Altai Krai
- District: Rubtsovsky District
- Time zone: UTC+7:00

Priozerny (Russian: Приозёрный) is a rural locality (a settlement) in Kuybyshevsky Selsoviet, Rubtsovsky District, Altai Krai, Russia. The population was 385 as of 2013. There are 9 streets.

== Geography ==
Priozerny is located 10 km north of Rubtsovsk (the district's administrative centre) by road. Opytny is the nearest rural locality.
