= Marina Uspenskaya =

Russian painter

Marina Yevgenyevna Uspenskaya (Russian: Мари́на Евге́ньевна Успе́нская; June 18, 1925 – 2007) was a prominent Russian children's book illustrator and graphics painter.

== Biography ==
Marina Uspenskaya was born in Moscow in 1925. She graduated from the 1905 Art College, where she studied theatre and decorative arts under Professor V.A. Shestakov. In 1947 she entered the graphics department of the Surikov Institute in Moscow, where she studied under professor D.E. Dekhtyaryev in the book illustration studio.

== Works ==
After graduation she found her passion and craft, making illustrations for children's books. Throughout her career, she made illustrations for some 200 children's books in the Soviet Union, Czechoslovakia, Russia, France, India and Japan. She worked for several of the largest publishing houses in her native country, including Detskaya Literatura, Detgiz and Malysh. She is particularly famous for her illustrations for classic Russian fairy tales, including Ruslan and Lyudmila and Silver Hoof. Marina Evgenevna was one of the anchor artists on the children's journal Murzilka from 1958 to the late 1960s. In total, her illustrations have been printed in more than 115 million books and postcards.

Marina Evgenevna continued the tradition of her grandfather Vasily Navozov, artist and Academy member, and for many years her life was connected to famous Moscow artist and academician Boris Uspensky. Her art changed over time, but always in her very personal and highly recognisable style. Applying water colour, Indian ink and gouache in warm and gentle colours, her illustrations were detailed, yet have a simple light touch. From the late 1960s onwards, she moved away from her classical realism into a more expressionistic and symbolic world.

From the late 1980s she watched, and was inspired by, the changes in everyday life happening in the transition from the Soviet Union to the new Russia. This was, for example, reflected in her colourful images, often in red or orange, of the New Russian Women – as she called them – which she boldly depicted in scenes from every-day life. Her favourite tool in her later years was the colour pencil, with which she depicted daily life in Moscow, be it in the Moscow metro or evenings at the theatre or the ballet.

== Bibliography ==
- 1963 “Children's Books Illustrators” by Ella Gankina, p. 201, 203
- 1977 “Contemporary Children's Books Illustrators”, by Ella Gankina, p. 135, 195
- 1978 The journal “Detskaya Literatura” (August)
- 1997 The journal “Khudozhnik”, volume 4
- 2003 Russian Artists’ Union
- 2004 "20th and 21st Century Graphics and Oil Painting", p. 165, 185
- 2008 "Marina Uspenskaya" — Masters of Soviet Art, volume 3 (In English and Russian). Gamborg Gallery.
