= Tuapsinsky District =

Tuapsinsky District Туапсинский район (Russian)
- District
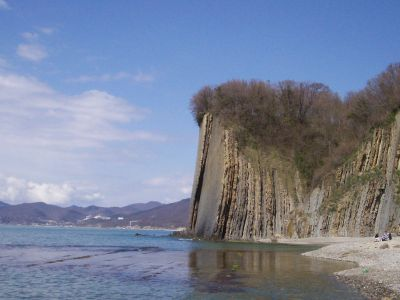
- Kiselyova Rock, a natural monument in Tuapsinsky District

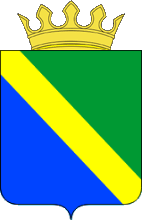
- Flag Coat of arms
- Location of Tuapsinsky District in Krasnodar Krai
- Coordinates: 44°06′N 39°05′E
- Country: Russia
- Federal subject: Krasnodar Krai
- Established: 26 January 1920
- Administrative center: Tuapse

Area
  - Total: 2,399 km^{2} (926 sq mi)

Population (2010 Census)
  - Total: 63,530
  - Density: 26.48/km^{2} (68.59/sq mi)
  - Urban: 24.3%
  - Rural: 75.7%

Administrative structure
  - Administrative divisions: 2 Settlement okrugs, 7 Rural okrugs
  - Inhabited localities: 2 urban-type settlements, 62 rural localities

Municipal structure
  - Municipally incorporated as: Tuapsinsky Municipal District
  - Municipal divisions: 3 urban settlements, 7 rural settlements
- Time zone: UTC+3 (MSK)
- OKTMO ID: 03555000
- Website: http://www.tuapseregion.ru/

Tuapsinsky District (Russian: Туапси́нский райо́н) is an administrative district (raion), one of the thirty-eight in Krasnodar Krai, Russia. As a municipal division, it is incorporated as Tuapsinsky Municipal District. It is located in the south of the krai. The area of the district is 2,399 square kilometers (926 sq mi). Its administrative center is the town of Tuapse (which is not administratively a part of the district). Population: 63,530 (2010 census); 61,257 (2002 census); 59,809 (1989 Soviet census).

== Administrative and municipal status ==
Within the framework of administrative divisions, Tuapsinsky District is one of the thirty-eight in the krai. The town of Tuapse serves as its administrative center, despite being incorporated separately as an administrative unit with the status equal to that of the districts.

As a municipal division, the district is incorporated as Tuapsinsky Municipal District, with the Town of Tuapse being incorporated within it as Tuapsinskoye Urban Settlement.
