= Gulkevichi =

Town in Krasnodar Krai, Russia

Gulkevichi Гулькевичи
- Town
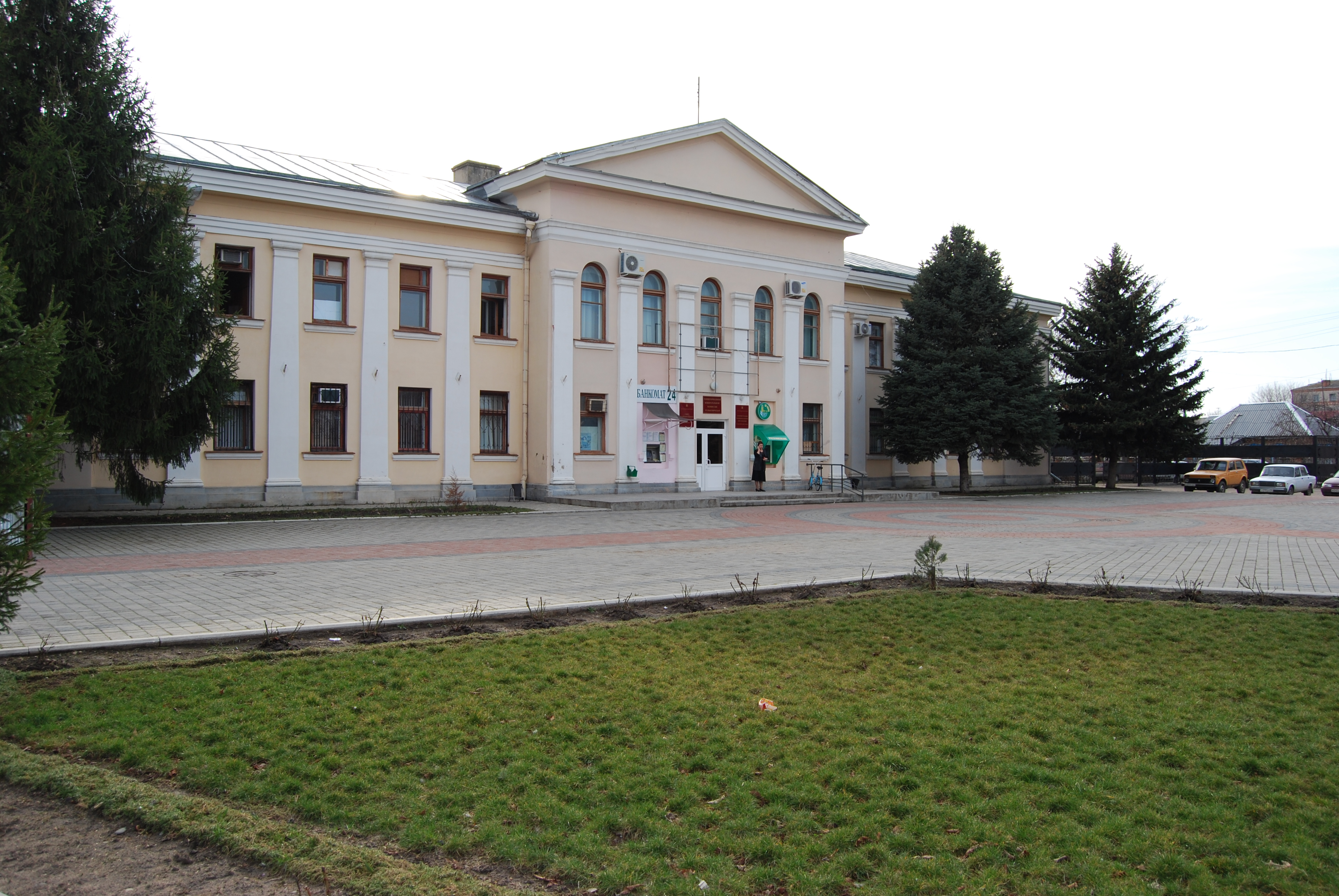
- Administration building, Gulkevichi

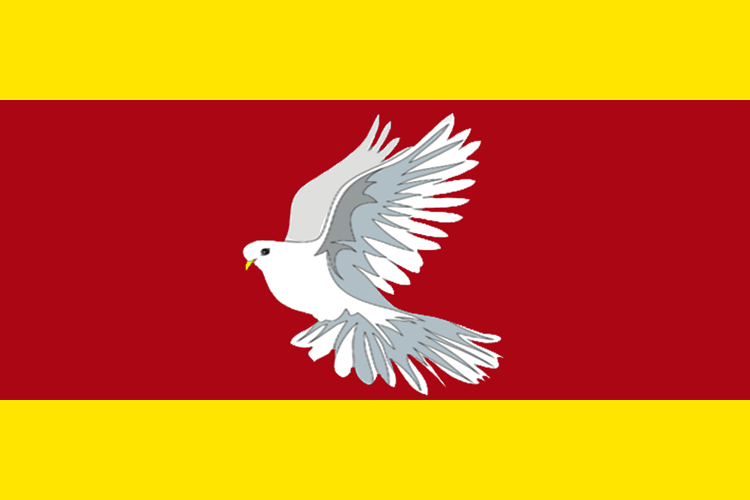
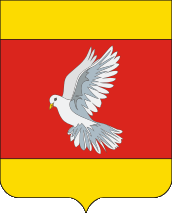
- Flag Coat of arms
- Interactive map of Gulkevichi
- Location of Gulkevichi Gulkevichi (Krasnodar Krai)
- Coordinates: 45°21′34″N 40°42′26″E
- Country: Russia
- Federal subject: Krasnodar Krai
- Administrative district: Gulkevichsky District
- TownSelsoviet: Gulkevichi
- Founded: 1875
- Town status since: 1961
- Elevation: 98 m (322 ft)

Population (2010 Census)
  - Total: 35,244
  - Estimate (2025): 32,911 (−6.6%)

Administrative status
  - Capital of: Gulkevichsky District, Town of Gulkevichi

Municipal status
  - Municipal district: Gulkevichsky Municipal District
  - Urban settlement: Gulkevichskoye Urban Settlement
  - Capital of: Gulkevichsky Municipal District, Gulkevichskoye Urban Settlement
- Time zone: UTC+3 (MSK)
- Postal code: 352190
- OKTMO ID: 03613101001

Gulkevichi (Russian: Гульке́вичи) is a town and the administrative center of Gulkevichsky District of Krasnodar Krai, Russia, located 150 kilometers (93 mi) northeast of Krasnodar. Population: 34,272 people (2020), 35,244 (2010 census); 35,141 (2002 census); 31,668 (1989 Soviet census).

== History ==
It appeared as a settlement at the Gulkevichi station, opened in 1875 (the name is based on the location of the station on the land owned by the councilor N. V. Gulkevichu). Town status was granted to it in 1961.

== Administrative and municipal status ==
Within the framework of administrative divisions, Gulkevichi serves as the administrative center of Gulkevichsky District. As an administrative division, it is, together with two rural localities, incorporated within Gulkevichsky District as the Town of Gulkevichi. As a municipal division, the Town of Gulkevichi is incorporated within Gulkevichsky Municipal District as Gulkevichskoye Urban Settlement.

== Notable people ==
- Andronik Karagezyan (born 1974), former Russian professional football player
