= Kurganinsk =

Town in Krasnodar Krai, Russia

Kurganinsk Курганинск
- Town
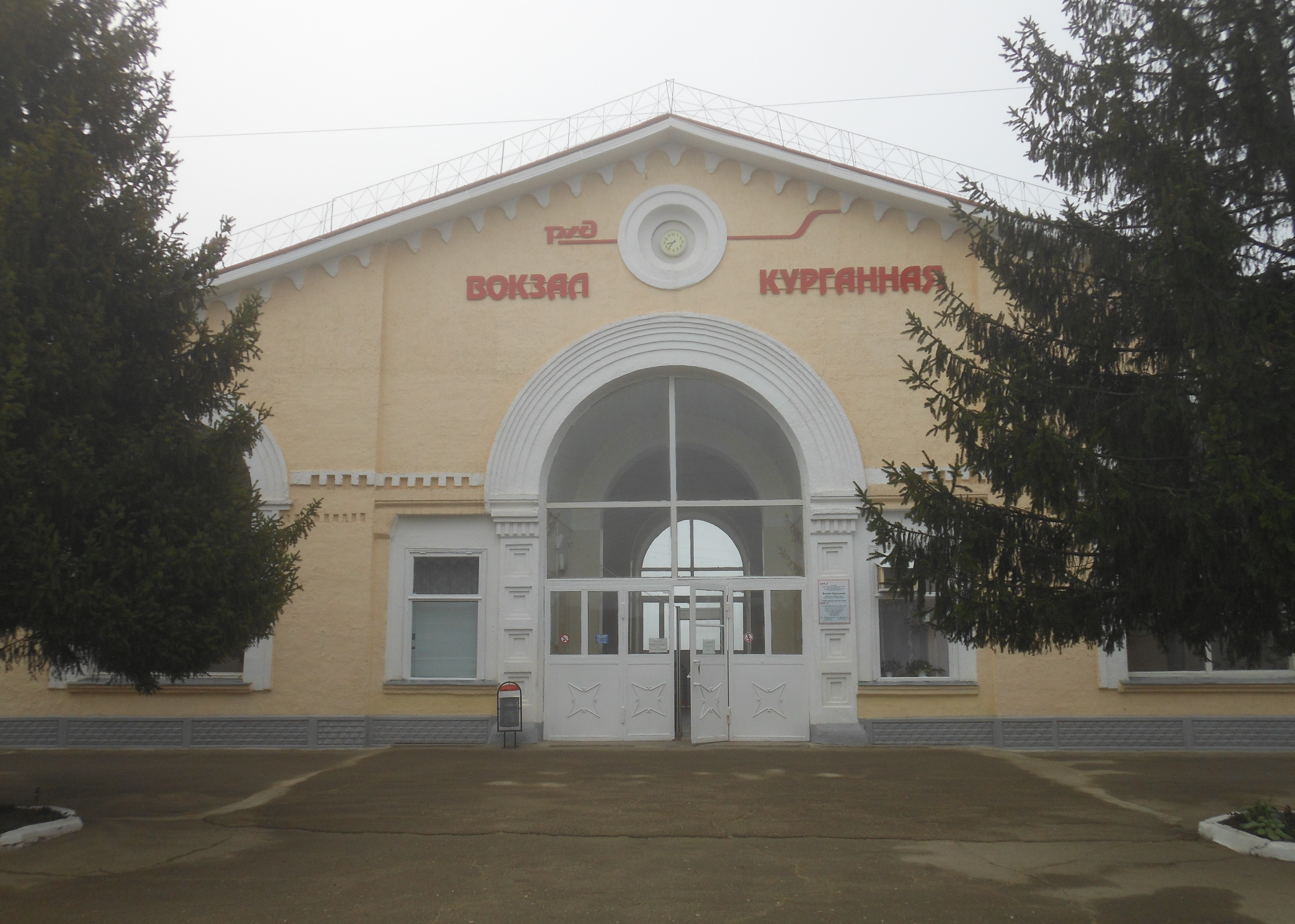
- Railway station, Kurganinsk

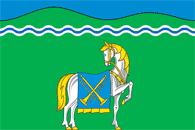
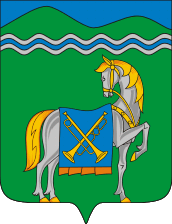
- Flag Coat of arms
- Interactive map of Kurganinsk
- Location of Kurganinsk Kurganinsk (European Russia) Kurganinsk (Russia)
- Coordinates: 44°52′N 40°37′E
- Country: Russia
- Federal subject: Krasnodar Krai
- Administrative district: Kurganinsky District
- TownSelsoviet: Kurganinsk
- Founded: 1855
- Town status since: 1961
- Elevation: 165 m (541 ft)

Population (2010 Census)
  - Total: 47,970
  - Estimate (2025): 46,089 (−3.9%)

Administrative status
  - Capital of: Kurganinsky District, Town of Kurganinsk

Municipal status
  - Municipal district: Kurganinsky Municipal District
  - Urban settlement: Kurganinskoye Urban Settlement
  - Capital of: Kurganinsky Municipal District, Kurganinskoye Urban Settlement
- Time zone: UTC+3 (MSK)
- Postal code: 352430–352437
- OKTMO ID: 03627101001
- Website: www.admkurganinsk.ru

Kurganinsk (Russian: Курга́нинск; until 1961: Kurgannaya, Russian: Курга́нная, Ukrainian: Курганна, romanized: Kurhanna) is a town and the administrative center of Kurganinsky District of Krasnodar Krai, Russia, located on the right bank of the Bolshaya Laba River 248 kilometers (154 mi) east of Krasnodar, the administrative center of the krai. Population: 48,194 people (2020), 47,970 (2010 census); 46,618 (2002 census); 40,763 (1989 Soviet census).

== History ==
It was founded in 1855 as the stanitsa of Kurgannaya (Курга́нная) by the Cossacks. According to the 1926 census, it had a population of 13,717, 65.2% Russian and 30.1% Ukrainian. It was renamed and granted town status in 1961.

== Administrative and municipal status ==
Within the framework of administrative divisions, Kurganinsk serves as the administrative center of Kurganinsky District. As an administrative division, it is, together with two rural localities, incorporated within Kurganinsky District as the Town of Kurganinsk. As a municipal division, the Town of Kurganinsk is incorporated within Kurganinsky Municipal District as Kurganinskoye Urban Settlement.
