= Uspenskoye, Krasnodar Krai =

Uspenskoye Успенское
- Selo
- Interactive map of Uspenskoye
- Location of Uspenskoye Uspenskoye (Krasnodar Krai)
- Coordinates: 44°50′N 41°24′E
- Country: Russia
- Federal subject: Krasnodar Krai
- Administrative district: Uspensky District
- Founded: 1864 (Julian)
- Elevation: 250 m (820 ft)

Population (2010 Census)
  - Total: 12,409
  - Estimate (2021): 11,286 (−9%)

Administrative status
  - Capital of: Uspensky District
- Time zone: UTC+3 (MSK)
- Postal code: 352450
- OKTMO ID: 03656443101

Uspenskoye (Russian: Успенское) is a rural locality (a selo) and the administrative center of Uspensky District in Krasnodar Krai, Russia, located on the Kuban River. Population: 12,409 (2010 census); 11,692 (2002 census); 9,945 (1989 Soviet census).
