= Girey, Russia =

Girey Гирей
- Urban-type settlement
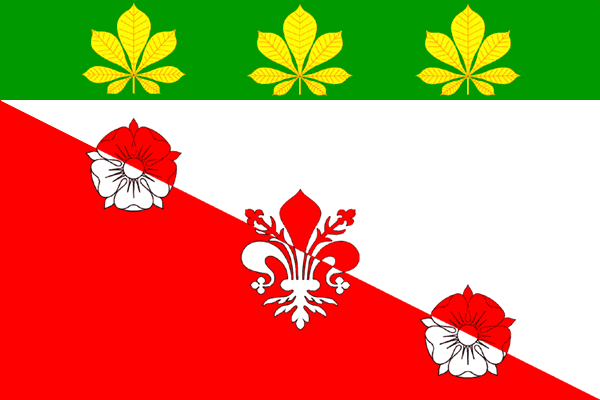
- Flag
- Interactive map of Girey
- Location of Girey Girey (Krasnodar Krai)
- Coordinates: 45.4024°N 40.6583°E
- Country: Russia
- Federal subject: Krasnodar Krai
- Administrative district: Gulkevichsky District
- Elevation: 75 m (246 ft)

Population (2010 Census)
  - Total: 6,586
  - Estimate (2023): 6,171 (−6.3%)
- Time zone: UTC+3 (MSK)
- Postal codes: 352160–352160, 352162
- OKTMO ID: 03613154051

Girey (Russian: Гире́й) is an urban locality (an urban-type settlement) in Gulkevichsky District of Krasnodar Krai, Russia. Population: 6,586 (2010 census); 6,626 (2002 census); 5,769 (1989 Soviet census).
