= Uspensky District =

Uspensky District Успенский район (Russian)
- District
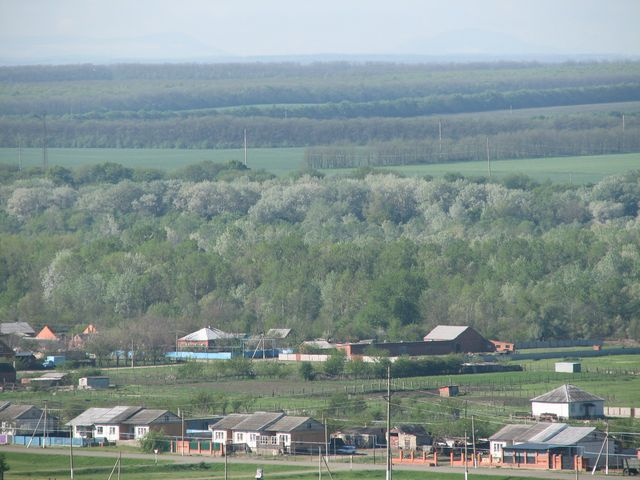
- Konokovsky, Uspensky District

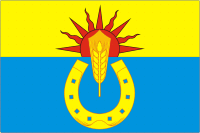
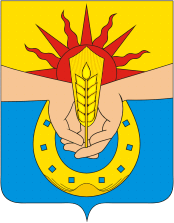
- Flag Coat of arms
- Location of Uspensky District in Krasnodar Krai
- Coordinates: 44°49′55″N 41°22′56″E
- Country: Russia
- Federal subject: Krasnodar Krai
- Established: 1924
- Administrative center: Uspenskoye

Area
  - Total: 1,129.98 km^{2} (436.29 sq mi)

Population (2010 Census)
  - Total: 41,273
  - Density: 36.525/km^{2} (94.600/sq mi)
  - Urban: 0%
  - Rural: 100%

Administrative structure
  - Administrative divisions: 10 Rural okrugs
  - Inhabited localities: 32 rural localities

Municipal structure
  - Municipally incorporated as: Uspensky Municipal District
  - Municipal divisions: 0 urban settlements, 10 rural settlements
- Time zone: UTC+3 (MSK)
- OKTMO ID: 03656000
- Website: http://www.adm-uspenskoe.ru/

Uspensky District (Russian: Успе́нский райо́н) is an administrative district (raion), one of the thirty-eight in Krasnodar Krai, Russia. As a municipal division, it is incorporated as Uspensky Municipal District. It is located in the east of the krai. The area of the district is 1,229.98 square kilometers (474.90 sq mi). Its administrative center is the rural locality (a selo) of Uspenskoye. Population: 41,273 (2010 census); 40,873 (2002 census); 36,697 (1989 Soviet census). The population of Uspenskoye accounts for 30.1% of the district's total population.
