= Gulkevichsky District =

Gulkevichsky District Гулькевичский район (Russian)
- District
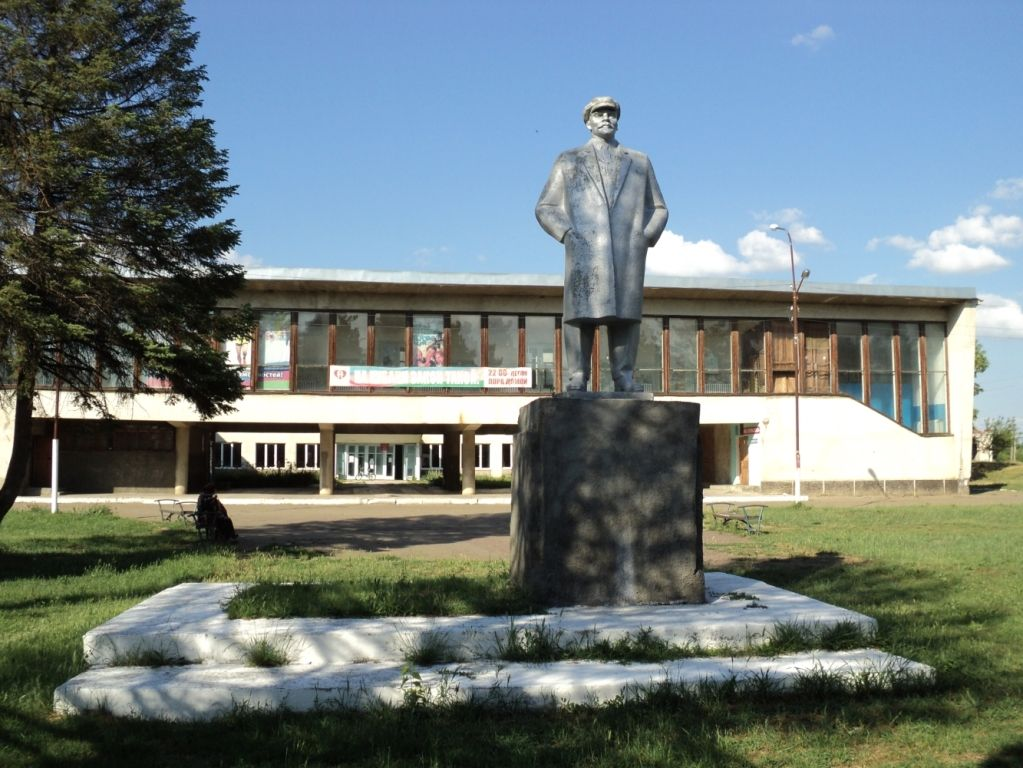
- Monument to Lenin, Gulkevichsky District

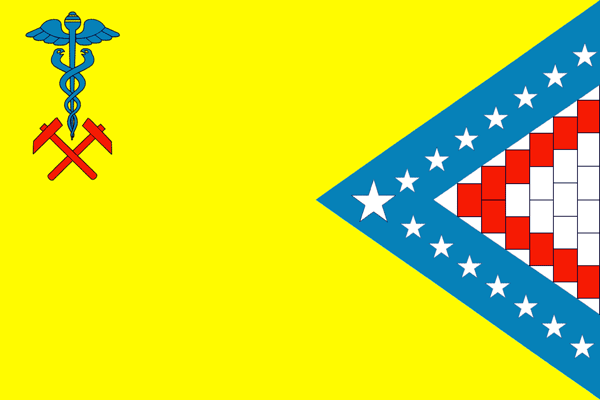
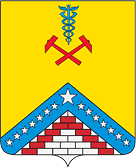
- Flag Coat of arms
- Location of Gulkevichsky District in Krasnodar Krai
- Coordinates: 45°21′00″N 40°41′57″E
- Country: Russia
- Federal subject: Krasnodar Krai
- Established: 1934
- Administrative center: Gulkevichi

Area
  - Total: 1,395.6 km^{2} (538.8 sq mi)

Population (2010 Census)
  - Total: 101,521
  - Density: 72.744/km^{2} (188.41/sq mi)
  - Urban: 48.9%
  - Rural: 51.1%

Administrative structure
  - Administrative divisions: 1 Towns, 2 Settlement okrugs, 11 Rural okrugs, 1 Stanitsa okrugs
  - Inhabited localities: 1 cities/towns, 2 urban-type settlements, 60 rural localities

Municipal structure
  - Municipally incorporated as: Gulkevichsky Municipal District
  - Municipal divisions: 3 urban settlements, 12 rural settlements
- Time zone: UTC+3 (MSK)
- OKTMO ID: 03613000
- Website: https://krasnodar.ru/content/40/show/34754/

Gulkevichsky District (Russian: Гульке́вичский райо́н) is an administrative district (raion), one of the thirty-eight in Krasnodar Krai, Russia. As a municipal division, it is incorporated as Gulkevichsky Municipal District. It is located in the east of the krai. The area of the district is 1,395.6 square kilometers (538.8 sq mi). Its administrative center is the town of Gulkevichi. Population: 101,521 (2010 census); 102,632 (2002 census); 91,201 (1989 Soviet census). The population of Gulkevichi accounts for 34.7% of the district's total population.
