= Vesyoly =

Vesyoly (Russian: Весёлый; masculine), Vesyolaya (Весёлая; feminine), or Vesyoloye (Весёлое; neuter) is the name of several rural localities in Russia:

== Republic of Adygea ==
As of 2010, four rural localities in the Republic of Adygea bear this name:

- Vesyoly, Maykop, Republic of Adygea, a khutor under the administrative jurisdiction of Maykop Republican Urban Okrug
- Vesyoly (Abadzekhskoye Rural Settlement), Maykopsky District, Republic of Adygea, a khutor in Maykopsky District; municipally, a part of Abadzekhskoye Rural Settlement of that district
- Vesyoly (Kamennomostskoye Rural Settlement), Maykopsky District, Republic of Adygea, a khutor in Maykopsky District; municipally, a part of Kamennomostskoye Rural Settlement of that district
- Vesyoly, Shovgenovsky District, Republic of Adygea, a khutor in Shovgenovsky District

== Altai Krai ==
As of 2010, one rural locality in Altai Krai bears this name:

- Vesyoloye, Altai Krai, a selo under the administrative jurisdiction of the town of krai significance of Slavgorod

== Amur Oblast ==
As of 2010, one rural locality in Amur Oblast bears this name:

- Vesyoloye, Amur Oblast, a selo in Arginsky Rural Settlement of Seryshevsky District

== Republic of Bashkortostan ==
As of 2010, two rural localities in the Republic of Bashkortostan bear this name:

- Vesyoly, Iglinsky District, Republic of Bashkortostan, a village in Krasnovoskhodsky Selsoviet of Iglinsky District
- Vesyoly, Sterlitamaksky District, Republic of Bashkortostan, a village in Oktyabrsky Selsoviet of Sterlitamaksky District

== Belgorod Oblast ==
As of 2010, eight rural localities in Belgorod Oblast bear this name:

- Vesyoly, Gubkinsky District, Belgorod Oblast, a khutor in Gubkinsky District
- Vesyoly, Korochansky District, Belgorod Oblast, a khutor in Korochansky District
- Vesyoly, Krasnensky District, Belgorod Oblast, a khutor in Raskhovetsky Rural Okrug of Krasnensky District
- Vesyoly, Novooskolsky District, Belgorod Oblast, a khutor in Novooskolsky District
- Vesyoly, Prokhorovsky District, Belgorod Oblast, a khutor in Prokhorovsky District
- Vesyoly, Veydelevsky District, Belgorod Oblast, a khutor in Veydelevsky District
- Vesyoly, Yakovlevsky District, Belgorod Oblast, a khutor in Yakovlevsky District
- Vesyoloye, Belgorod Oblast, a selo in Krasnogvardeysky District

== Bryansk Oblast ==
As of 2010, three rural localities in Bryansk Oblast bear this name:

- Vesyoly, Bryansky District, Bryansk Oblast, a settlement in Novodarkovichsky Selsoviet of Bryansky District
- Vesyoly, Dushatinsky Selsoviet, Surazhsky District, Bryansk Oblast, a settlement in Dushatinsky Selsoviet of Surazhsky District
- Vesyoly, Lopaznensky Selsoviet, Surazhsky District, Bryansk Oblast, a settlement in Lopaznensky Selsoviet of Surazhsky District

== Irkutsk Oblast ==
As of 2010, one rural locality in Irkutsk Oblast bears this name:

- Vesyoly, Irkutsk Oblast, a settlement in Chunsky District

== Kaliningrad Oblast ==
As of 2010, one rural locality in Kaliningrad Oblast bears this name:

- Vesyoly, Kaliningrad Oblast, a settlement in Ozerkovsky Rural Okrug of Gvardeysky District

== Republic of Kalmykia ==
As of 2010, two rural localities in the Republic of Kalmykia bear this name:

- Vesyoloye, Gorodovikovsky District, Republic of Kalmykia, a selo in Druzhnenskaya Rural Administration of Gorodovikovsky District
- Vesyoloye, Yashaltinsky District, Republic of Kalmykia, a selo in Veselovskaya Rural Administration of Yashaltinsky District

== Kemerovo Oblast ==
As of 2010, one rural locality in Kemerovo Oblast bears this name:

- Vesyoly, Kemerovo Oblast, a settlement in Krasulinskaya Rural Territory of Novokuznetsky District

== Khabarovsk Krai ==
As of 2010, one rural locality in Khabarovsk Krai bears this name:

- Vesyoly, Khabarovsk Krai, a settlement in Verkhnebureinsky District

== Krasnodar Krai ==
As of 2010, eighteen rural localities in Krasnodar Krai bear this name:

- Vesyoly, Goryachy Klyuch, Krasnodar Krai, a khutor in Kutaissky Rural Okrug of the Town of Goryachy Klyuch
- Vesyoly, Kanevskoy District, Krasnodar Krai, a settlement in Chelbassky Rural Okrug of Kanevskoy District
- Vesyoly, Keslerovsky Rural Okrug, Krymsky District, Krasnodar Krai, a khutor in Keslerovsky Rural Okrug of Krymsky District
- Vesyoly, Merchansky Rural Okrug, Krymsky District, Krasnodar Krai, a khutor in Merchansky Rural Okrug of Krymsky District
- Vesyoly, Yuzhny Rural Okrug, Krymsky District, Krasnodar Krai, a khutor in Yuzhny Rural Okrug of Krymsky District
- Vesyoly, Kurganinsky District, Krasnodar Krai, a settlement in Mikhaylovsky Rural Okrug of Kurganinsky District
- Vesyoly, Voznesensky Rural Okrug, Labinsky District, Krasnodar Krai, a settlement in Voznesensky Rural Okrug of Labinsky District
- Vesyoly, Zassovsky Rural Okrug, Labinsky District, Krasnodar Krai, a khutor in Zassovsky Rural Okrug of Labinsky District
- Vesyoly, Mostovsky District, Krasnodar Krai, a khutor in Mostovskoy Settlement Okrug of Mostovsky District
- Vesyoly, Novokubansky District, Krasnodar Krai, a settlement in Prikubansky Rural Okrug of Novokubansky District
- Vesyoly, Krasnogvardeysky Rural Okrug, Otradnensky District, Krasnodar Krai, a khutor in Krasnogvardeysky Rural Okrug of Otradnensky District
- Vesyoly, Mayaksky Rural Okrug, Otradnensky District, Krasnodar Krai, a settlement in Mayaksky Rural Okrug of Otradnensky District
- Vesyoly, Seversky District, Krasnodar Krai, a khutor in Chernomorsky Settlement Okrug of Seversky District
- Vesyoly, Starominsky District, Krasnodar Krai, a khutor in Kuybyshevsky Rural Okrug of Starominsky District
- Vesyoly, Tbilissky District, Krasnodar Krai, a khutor in Vannovsky Rural Okrug of Tbilissky District
- Vesyoly, Uspensky District, Krasnodar Krai, a khutor in Veselovsky Rural Okrug of Uspensky District
- Vesyoloye, Krasnodar Krai, a selo in Nizhneshilovsky Rural Okrug of the City of Sochi
- Vesyolaya, Krasnodar Krai, a stanitsa in Veselovsky Stanitsa Okrug of Pavlovsky District

== Krasnoyarsk Krai ==
As of 2010, one rural locality in Krasnoyarsk Krai bears this name:

- Vesyoloye, Krasnoyarsk Krai, a selo in Veselovsky Selsoviet of Taseyevsky District

== Kursk Oblast ==
As of 2010, six rural localities in Kursk Oblast bear this name:

- Vesyoly, Bolshesoldatsky District, Kursk Oblast, a settlement in Lyubostansky Selsoviet of Bolshesoldatsky District
- Vesyoly, Soldatsky Selsoviet, Fatezhsky District, Kursk Oblast, a khutor in Soldatsky Selsoviet of Fatezhsky District
- Vesyoly, Verkhnekhotemlsky Selsoviet, Fatezhsky District, Kursk Oblast, a khutor in Verkhnekhotemlsky Selsoviet of Fatezhsky District
- Vesyoly, Khomutovsky District, Kursk Oblast, a settlement in Menshikovsky Selsoviet of Khomutovsky District
- Vesyoly, Zheleznogorsky District, Kursk Oblast, a khutor in Linetsky Selsoviet of Zheleznogorsky District
- Vesyoloye, Kursk Oblast, a selo in Veselovsky Selsoviet of Glushkovsky District

== Lipetsk Oblast ==
As of 2010, two rural localities in Lipetsk Oblast bear this name:

- Vesyoloye, Lipetsk Oblast, a village in Rogozhinsky Selsoviet of Zadonsky District
- Vesyolaya, Lipetsk Oblast, a village in Veselovsky Selsoviet of Dolgorukovsky District

== Republic of Mordovia ==
As of 2010, one rural locality in the Republic of Mordovia bears this name:

- Vesyoly, Republic of Mordovia, a settlement in Lavrentyevsky Selsoviet of Temnikovsky District

== Republic of North Ossetia–Alania ==
As of 2010, one rural locality in the Republic of North Ossetia–Alania bears this name:

- Vesyoloye, Republic of North Ossetia–Alania, a selo in Veselovsky Rural Okrug of Mozdoksky District

== Novosibirsk Oblast ==
As of 2010, one rural locality in Novosibirsk Oblast bears this name:

- Vesyolaya, Novosibirsk Oblast, a village in Severny District

== Omsk Oblast ==
As of 2010, two rural localities in Omsk Oblast bear this name:

- Vesyoly, Gorkovsky District, Omsk Oblast, a settlement in Astyrovsky Rural Okrug of Gorkovsky District
- Vesyoly, Moskalensky District, Omsk Oblast, a settlement in Zvezdinsky Rural Okrug of Moskalensky District

== Oryol Oblast ==
As of 2010, five rural localities in Oryol Oblast bear this name:

- Vesyoly, Glazunovsky District, Oryol Oblast, a settlement in Taginsky Selsoviet of Glazunovsky District
- Vesyoly, Kolpnyansky District, Oryol Oblast, a settlement in Znamensky Selsoviet of Kolpnyansky District
- Vesyoly, Soskovsky District, Oryol Oblast, a settlement in Almazovsky Selsoviet of Soskovsky District
- Vesyoly, Zalegoshchensky District, Oryol Oblast, a settlement in Lomovsky Selsoviet of Zalegoshchensky District
- Vesyolaya, Oryol Oblast, a village in Grachevsky Selsoviet of Zalegoshchensky District

== Penza Oblast ==
As of 2010, two rural localities in Penza Oblast bear this name:

- Vesyoly, Penza Oblast, a settlement in Volchkovsky Selsoviet of Belinsky District
- Vesyolaya, Penza Oblast, a village in Yursovsky Selsoviet of Zemetchinsky District

== Primorsky Krai ==
As of 2010, one rural locality in Primorsky Krai bears this name:

- Vesyoly, Primorsky Krai, a settlement in Anuchinsky District

== Rostov Oblast ==
As of 2010, eleven rural localities in Rostov Oblast bear this name:

- Vesyoly, Aksaysky District, Rostov Oblast, a khutor in Grushevskoye Rural Settlement of Aksaysky District
- Vesyoly, Dubovsky District, Rostov Oblast, a khutor in Veselovskoye Rural Settlement of Dubovsky District
- Vesyoly, Martynovsky District, Rostov Oblast, a khutor in Ilyinovskoye Rural Settlement of Martynovsky District
- Vesyoly, Myasnikovsky District, Rostov Oblast, a khutor in Nedvigovskoye Rural Settlement of Myasnikovsky District
- Vesyoly, Neklinovsky District, Rostov Oblast, a khutor in Polyakovskoye Rural Settlement of Neklinovsky District
- Vesyoly, Oktyabrsky District, Rostov Oblast, a khutor in Krasnokutskoye Rural Settlement of Oktyabrsky District
- Vesyoly, Orlovsky District, Rostov Oblast, a khutor in Ostrovyanskoye Rural Settlement of Orlovsky District
- Vesyoly, Remontnensky District, Rostov Oblast, a khutor in Podgornenskoye Rural Settlement of Remontnensky District
- Vesyoly, Rodionovo-Nesvetaysky District, Rostov Oblast, a khutor in Rodionovo-Nesvetayskoye Rural Settlement of Rodionovo-Nesvetaysky District
- Vesyoly, Tselinsky District, Rostov Oblast, a khutor in Kirovskoye Rural Settlement of Tselinsky District
- Vesyoly, Vesyolovsky District, Rostov Oblast, a settlement in Veselovskoye Rural Settlement of Vesyolovsky District

== Ryazan Oblast ==
As of 2010, two rural localities in Ryazan Oblast bear this name:

- Vesyoly, Sarayevsky District, Ryazan Oblast, a settlement in Mozharsky Rural Okrug of Sarayevsky District
- Vesyoly, Shatsky District, Ryazan Oblast, a settlement in Starocherneyevsky Rural Okrug of Shatsky District

== Stavropol Krai ==
As of 2010, seven rural localities in Stavropol Krai bear this name:

- Vesyoly, Andropovsky District, Stavropol Krai, a khutor in Kurshavsky Selsoviet of Andropovsky District
- Vesyoly, Dobrovolno-Vasilyevsky Selsoviet, Ipatovsky District, Stavropol Krai, a khutor in Dobrovolno-Vasilyevsky Selsoviet of Ipatovsky District
- Vesyoly, Limansky Selsoviet, Ipatovsky District, Stavropol Krai, a khutor in Limansky Selsoviet of Ipatovsky District
- Vesyoly, Kirovsky District, Stavropol Krai, a khutor in Gornozavodskoy Selsoviet of Kirovsky District
- Vesyoly, Mineralovodsky District, Stavropol Krai, a khutor in Maryino-Kolodtsevsky Selsoviet of Mineralovodsky District
- Vesyoly, Shpakovsky District, Stavropol Krai, a khutor in Temnolessky Selsoviet of Shpakovsky District
- Vesyoloye, Stavropol Krai, a selo in Ivanovsky Selsoviet of Kochubeyevsky District

== Tambov Oblast ==
As of 2010, one rural locality in Tambov Oblast bears this name:

- Vesyoloye, Tambov Oblast, a selo in Veselovsky Selsoviet of Morshansky District

== Tomsk Oblast ==
As of 2010, one rural locality in Tomsk Oblast bears this name:

- Vesyoloye, Tomsk Oblast, a selo in Chainsky District

== Tula Oblast ==
As of 2010, one rural locality in Tula Oblast bears this name:

- Vesyoly, Tula Oblast, a settlement in Novopokrovskaya Rural Administration of Chernsky District

== Tyumen Oblast ==
As of 2010, one rural locality in Tyumen Oblast bears this name:

- Vesyoly, Tyumen Oblast, a settlement in Dubrovinsky Rural Okrug of Yarkovsky District

== Volgograd Oblast ==
As of 2010, three rural localities in Volgograd Oblast bear this name:

- Vesyoly, Kotelnikovsky District, Volgograd Oblast, a khutor in Verkhnekurmoyarsky Selsoviet of Kotelnikovsky District
- Vesyoly, Mikhaylovsky District, Volgograd Oblast, a khutor in Oktyabrsky Selsoviet of Mikhaylovsky District
- Vesyoly, Novoanninsky District, Volgograd Oblast, a khutor in Staroanninsky Selsoviet of Novoanninsky District

== Vologda Oblast ==
As of 2010, three rural localities in Vologda Oblast bear this name:

- Vesyolaya, Nizhneyenangsky Selsoviet, Kichmengsko-Gorodetsky District, Vologda Oblast, a village in Nizhneyenangsky Selsoviet of Kichmengsko-Gorodetsky District
- Vesyolaya, Nizhneyentalsky Selsoviet, Kichmengsko-Gorodetsky District, Vologda Oblast, a village in Nizhneyentalsky Selsoviet of Kichmengsko-Gorodetsky District
- Vesyolaya, Vashkinsky District, Vologda Oblast, a village in Roksomsky Selsoviet of Vashkinsky District

== Voronezh Oblast ==
As of 2010, one rural locality in Voronezh Oblast bears this name:

- Vesyoly, Voronezh Oblast, a khutor in Uryvskoye Rural Settlement of Ostrogozhsky District

== See also ==
- Vesyolovsky (disambiguation)
- Vesele (disambiguation)
- Vesele, Sudak Municipality, a village in Crimea
