= Veselá =

Veselá may refer to:

== Places in the Czech Republic ==
- Veselá (Pelhřimov District), a municipality and village in the Vysočina Region
- Veselá (Rokycany District), a municipality and village in the Plzeň Region
- Veselá (Semily District), a municipality and village in the Liberec Region
- Veselá (Zlín District), a municipality and village in the Zlín Region
- Veselá, a village and part of Mnichovo Hradiště in the Central Bohemian Region
- Veselá, a village and part of Sedletín in the Vysočina Region
- Veselá, a village and part of Zašová in the Zlín Region

== People ==
- Feminine variant of surname Veselý

== See also ==
- Vesela (disambiguation)
- Vesele (disambiguation)
- Veselí (disambiguation)
