= Wessely =

Wessely is the German variant of the Czech surname Veselý. Notable people with the surname include:

- Clare Gerada, Lady Wessely (born 1959), British medical doctor
- Josephine Wessely (1860–1887), Austrian actress
- Karl Wessely (1860–1931), Austrian papyrus scholar
- Karl Bernhard Wessely, (1768-1826). Prussian composer.
- Kurt von Wessely (died 1917), Austrian tennis player
- Naphtali Hirz Wessely (1725–1805), German Hebraist and educator.
- Paula Wessely (1907–2000), Austrian actress
- Peter Wessely (born 1959), Austrian author
- Rudolf Wessely (1925–2016), Austrian actor
- Simon Wessely (born 1956), British psychiatrist

== See also ==
- Ferdinand Wesely
- Veselí (disambiguation)
- Veselý, a surname
