= Veselý =

Veselý (feminine: Veselá) is a Czech and Slovak surname meaning "merry" or "cheerful".

Notable people with the surname Veselá include:

- Alena Veselá (1923–2025), Czech organist and music teacher
- Hana Veselá, Czech figure skater
- Jana Veselá (born 1983), Czech basketball player
- Jarmila Veselá (1899–1972), Czech criminal lawyer
- Libuše Veselá (1900–1973), Czech figure skater
- Markéta Veselá (born 1970), Czech architect

Notable people with the surname Veselý include:

- Aleš Veselý (1935–2015), Czech sculptor
- Austin Vesely, director of the 2018 American comedy horror film Slice
- Bohumil Veselý (born 1945), Czech footballer
- Dalibor Vesely (1934–2015), Czech architect
- František Veselý (1943–2009), Czech footballer
- Jan Veselý (born 1990), Czech basketball player
- Jan Veselý (cyclist) (1923–2003), Czech cyclist
- Jaroslav Veselý (born 1937), Czech sport shooter
- Jindřich Veselý (1885–1939), Czech puppeteer
- Jiří Veselý (born 1993), Czech tennis player
- Matt Vesely, Australian filmmaker, director of Monolith (2022)
- Ondřej Veselý (born 1977), Czech ice hockey player
- Petr Veselý (canoeist) (born 1976), Czech canoeist
- Petr Veselý (footballer) (born 1971), Czech footballer
- Radek Veselý (born 1996), Czech ice hockey player
- Tim Vesely (born 1963), Canadian musician and songwriter
- Václav Veselý (1900–1941), Czech gymnast
- Vítězslav Veselý (born 1983), Czech javelin thrower
- Vladimír Veselý (born 1976), Slovak footballer
- Vlastimil Veselý (born 1993), Czech footballer

== See also ==
- Veselá (disambiguation)
- Veselé (disambiguation)
- Veselí (disambiguation)
- Vesyoly, alternatively spelled Vesely; name of several rural localities in Russia
