= Khanskaya =

Khanskaya Ханская
- Stanitsa

Other transcription(s)
  - Adyghe: Хъанхьабл
- Interactive map of Khanskaya
- Location of Khanskaya Khanskaya (Republic of Adygea)
- Coordinates: 44°41′N 39°58′E
- Country: Russia
- Federal subject: Adygea
- Founded: 1862
- Elevation: 159 m (522 ft)

Population (2010 Census)
  - Total: 11,245
  - Estimate (2024): 11,152 (−0.8%)

Administrative status
  - Subordinated to: Maykop Republican Urban Okrug
- Time zone: UTC+3 (MSK)
- Postal codes: 385060, 385061
- OKTMO ID: 79701000141

Khanskaya population
- 2010 Census: 11,245
- 2002 Census: 11,290
- 1979 Census: 10,224

Khanskaya (Russian: Ха́нская; Adyghe: Хъанхьабл) is a rural locality (a stanitsa) under the administrative jurisdiction of Maykop Republican Urban Okrug in the Republic of Adygea, Russia, located on the Belaya River 13 kilometers (8.1 mi) northwest of Maykop. The population as of 2020 is 11,679.

It was established in 1862.
