= Zapadny, Republic of Adygea =

Zapadny Западный Къохьапӏэ
- Settlement
- Location within Republic of Adygea Location within Russia
- Coordinates: 44°37′N 40°04′E
- Country: Russia
- Region: Adygea
- District: Maykop
- Time zone: UTC+3:00

Zapadny (Russian: За́падный; Adyghe: Къохьапӏэ) is a settlement in the urban okrug of Maykop, Russia. The population was 3430 as of 2018. There are 45 streets.

== Geography ==
The settlement is located near Maykop.

== Ethnicity ==
The settlement is inhabited by Circassians and Russians.
