= Vesele =

Vesele or Veselé may refer to:

== Czech Republic ==
- Veselé, Czech Republic, a municipality and village

== Slovakia ==
- Veselé, Slovakia, a municipality and village

== Ukraine ==
- Vesele, Donetsk Raion, Donetsk Oblast, a village
- Vesele, Bakhmut Raion, Donetsk Oblast, a village
- Vesele, Hrodivka settlement hromada, Pokrovsk Raion, Donetsk Oblast, a village
- Vesele, Zaporizhzhia Oblast, an urban-type settlement
  - Vesele Raion, a former raion of Ukraine
- Vesele, Sudak Municipality, a village

== See also ==
- Male Vesele, a rural-type settlement in Ukraine
- Vesela (disambiguation)
- Veselí (disambiguation)
- Vesyoly
