= Veselí =

Veselí may refer to places in the Czech Republic:

- Veselí (Pardubice District), a municipality and village in the Pardubice Region
- Veselí, a village and part of Dalečín in the Vysočina Region
- Veselí, a village and part of Janovice nad Úhlavou in the Plzeň Region
- Veselí, a village and part of Lomnice (Brno-Country District) in the South Moravian Region
- Veselí, a village and part of Odry in the Moravian-Silesian Region
- Veselí, a village and part of Pavlov (Šumperk District) in the Olomouc Region
- Veselí, a village and part of Štětí in the Ústí nad Labem Region
- Veselí, a village and part of Zákupy in the Liberec Region
- Veselí, a village and part of Železný Brod in the Liberec Region
- Veselí nad Lužnicí, a town in the South Bohemian Region
- Veselí nad Moravou, a town in the South Moravian Region
- Vysoké Veselí, a town in the Hradec Králové Region

== See also ==
- Veselý, a surname
- Veselá (disambiguation)
- Vesele (disambiguation)
