= Kosinov, Adygeya =

Kosinov Косинов
- Khutor
- Location within Republic of Adygea Location within Russia
- Coordinates: 44°43′N 40°05′E
- Country: Russia
- Region: Adygea
- District: Maykop
- Time zone: UTC+3:00

Kosinov (Russian: Косинов) is a khutor in the urban okrug of Maykop, Russia. The population was 312 as of 2018. There are 2 streets.

== Geography ==
The khutor is located in the center of Adygea, 19 km (8 miles) north of Maykop (the district's administrative centre) by road. Podgorny is the nearest rural locality.
