= Rodnikovy =

Rodnikovy Родниковый Псынэкӏэчъ
- Settlement
- Location within Republic of Adygea Location within Russia
- Coordinates: 44°40′N 40°00′E
- Country: Russia
- Region: Adygea
- District: Maykop
- Time zone: UTC+3:00

Rodnikovy (Russian: Родниковый; Adyghe: Псынэкӏэчъ) is a settlement in the urban okrug of Maykop, Russia. The population was 1,267 as of 2018. There are 11 streets.

== Geography ==
The settlement is located near the federal highway A-160, 18 km northwest of Maykop (the district's administrative centre) by road. Khanskaya is the nearest rural locality.
