= Severny, Republic of Adygea =

Severny Северный Темыр
- Settlement
- Location within Republic of Adygea Location within Russia
- Coordinates: 44°39′N 40°06′E
- Country: Russia
- Region: Adygea
- District: Maykop
- Time zone: UTC+3:00

Severny (Russian: Северный; Adyghe: Темыр) is a settlement in the urban okrug of Maykop, Russia. The population was 1271 as of 2018. There are 51 streets.

== Geography ==
Severny is located 9 km north of Maykop (the district's administrative centre) by road. Severo-Vostochnye Sady is the nearest rural locality.
