= Gaverdovsky =

Gaverdovsky Гавердовский
- Khutor
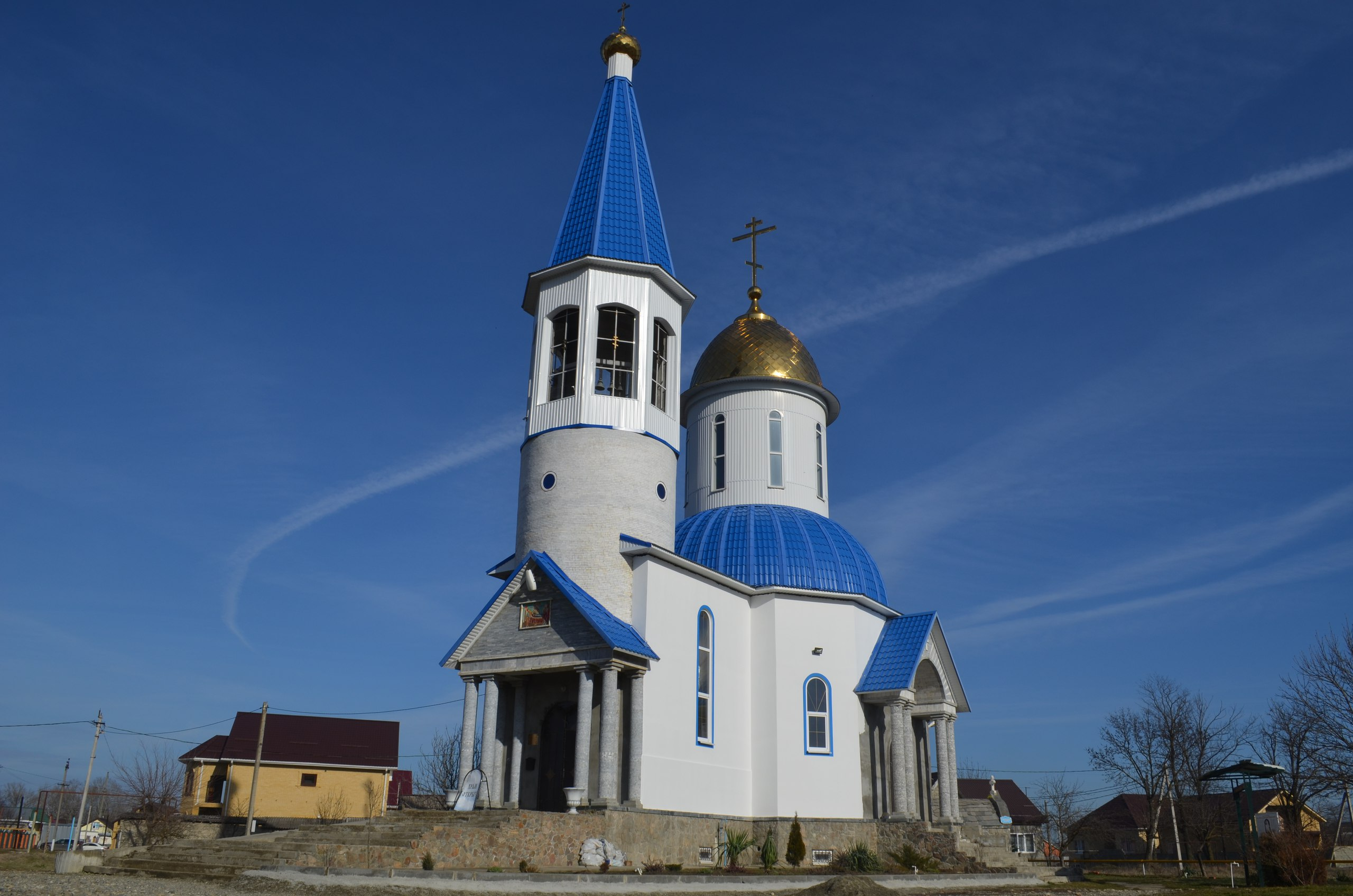

- Location within Republic of Adygea Location within Russia
- Coordinates: 44°36′N 40°01′E
- Country: Russia
- Region: Adygea
- District: Maykop
- Time zone: UTC+3:00

Gaverdovsky (Russian: Гавердовский, romanized: Gaverdovskiy; Adyghe: Гавердовск, romanized: Gaverdovsk) is a khutor in Koshekhablsky District, urban okrug of Maykop, Russia. The population was 3,824 as of 2018. There are 65 streets.

== Geography ==
The khutor is located on the right bank of the Belaya River, 8 km west of Maykop (the district's administrative centre) by road. Maykop is the nearest rural locality.

== Ethnicity ==
The khutor is inhabited by Circassians, Pontic and Tsalka Greeks and Russians.
