= Veselí (Pardubice District) =

- Municipality
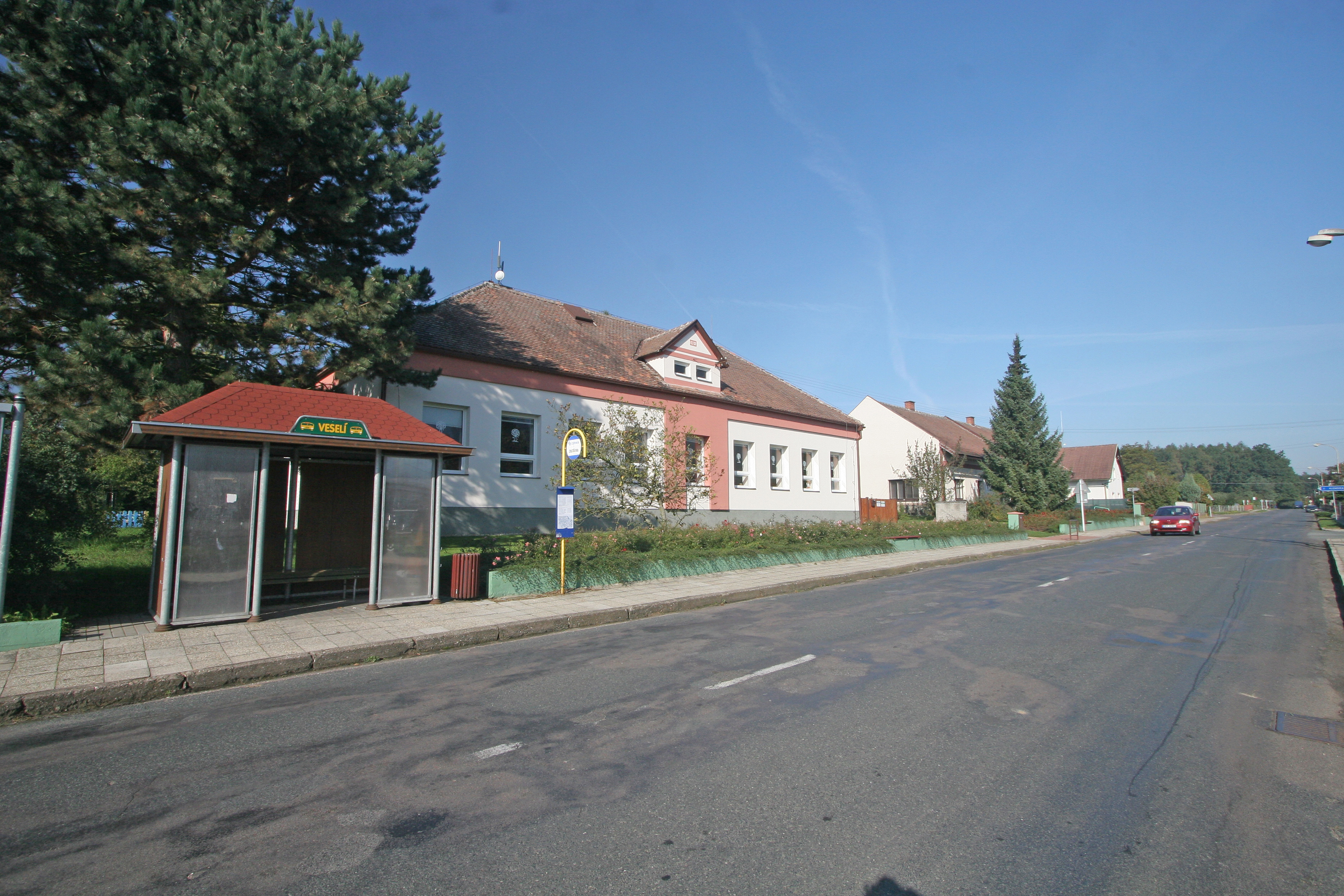
- Kindergarten by the main road

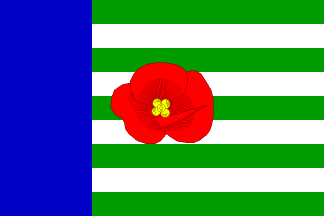
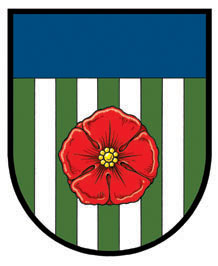
- Flag Coat of arms

- Location in the Czech Republic
- Coordinates: 50°0′40″N 15°37′8″E
- Country: Czech Republic
- Region: Pardubice
- District: Pardubice
- First mentioned: 1401

Area
  - Total: 3.01 km^{2} (1.16 sq mi)
- Elevation: 232 m (761 ft)

Population (2026-01-01)
  - Total: 400
  - Density: 130/km^{2} (340/sq mi)
- Time zone: UTC+1 (CET)
  - Summer (DST): UTC+2 (CEST)
- Postal code: 535 01
- Website: www.obecveseli.cz

Veselí is a municipality and village in Pardubice District in the Pardubice Region of the Czech Republic. It has about 400 inhabitants.

== Etymology ==
The word veselí means 'mirth', 'merriment' in Czech. It was a frequent name of newly founded settlements, which were given this name to ensure that its inhabitants would always be happy and joyful.

== Geography ==
Veselí is located about 11 kilometres (7 mi) west of Pardubice. It lies in the western tip of the Svitavy Uplands. The highest point is at 253 m (830 ft) above sea level.

The Struha Stream flows along the eastern municipal border. The surroundings of the Struha with the original meandering stream bed is protected as the Meandry Struhy National Nature Monument. This national nature monument has an area of 40.2 ha (99 acres).

== History ==
The first written mention of Veselí is from 1401. For most of its history, the village belonged to the Choltice estate. In the 1530s, three homesteads of the village were divided due to debts, but in 1703, the village was reunited. The village was devastated during the Thirty Years' War and the population significantly decreased.

Veselí was affected by the Battle of Königgrätz in 1866, after which Prussian units were stationed there. In the second half of the 19th century and early 20th century, Veselí gradually developed. The primary school was established in 1925. During the interwar period, social and cultural life flourished. In 1943, electrification took place. After World War II, collectivisation, infrastructure modernisation and the gradual transformation of the village followed.

== Demographics ==
Historical population

Year	Pop.	±%
1869	327	—
1880	357	+9.2%
1890	344	−3.6%
1900	338	−1.7%
1910	301	−10.9%

Year	Pop.	±%
1921	293	−2.7%
1930	333	+13.7%
1950	311	−6.6%
1961	376	+20.9%
1970	337	−10.4%

Year	Pop.	±%
1980	314	−6.8%
1991	301	−4.1%
2001	296	−1.7%
2011	377	+27.4%
2021	356	−5.6%

Source: Censuses

== Transport ==
Veselí is located on the railway line Přelouč–Heřmanův Městec.

There are no major roads passing through the municipality. The airport in the territory of Veselí is non-public.

== Sights ==
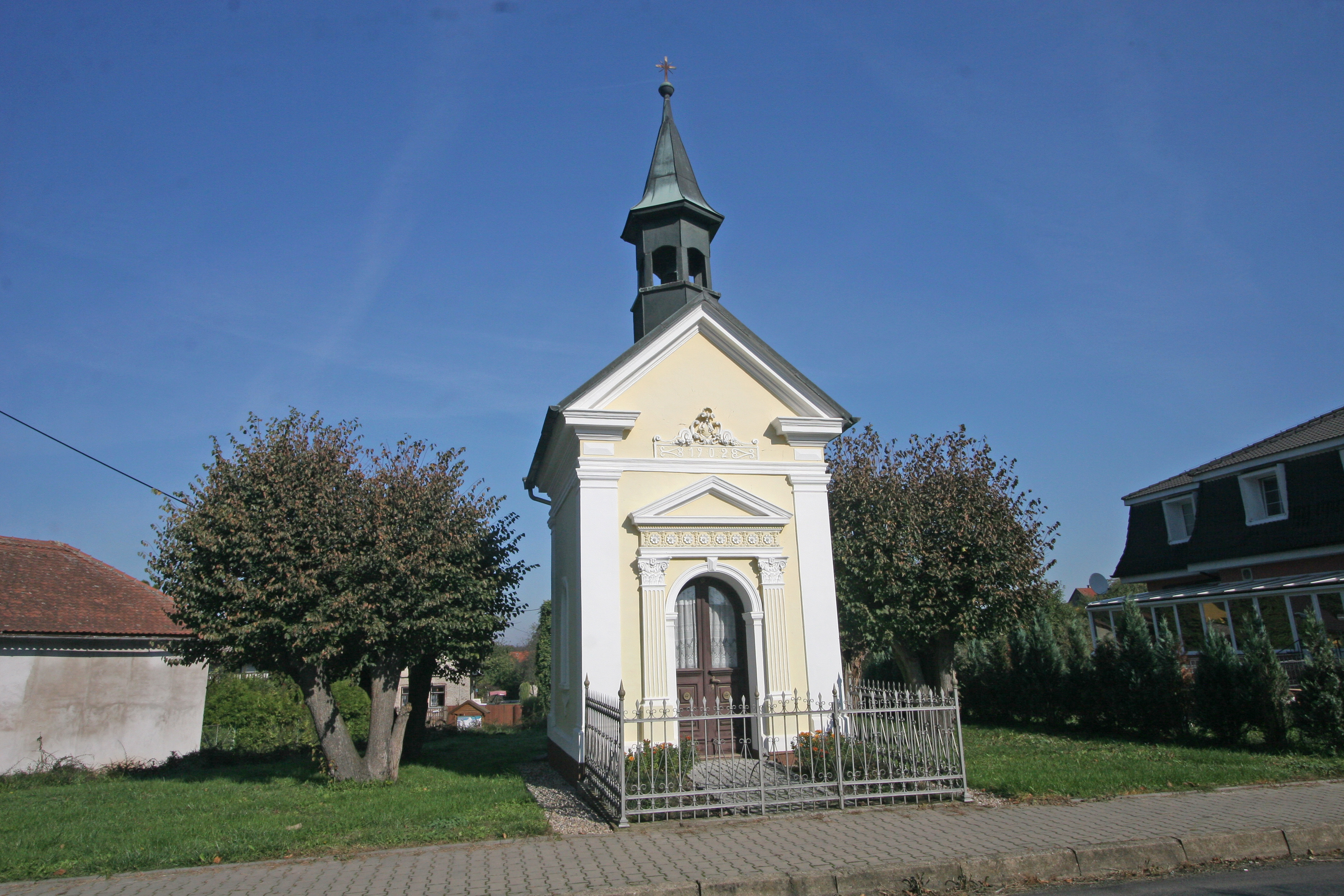
Chapel

There are no protected cultural monuments in the municipality. The main cultural landmark of Veselí is a small chapel, built in 1825.
