= Veselá (Zlín District) =

- Municipality
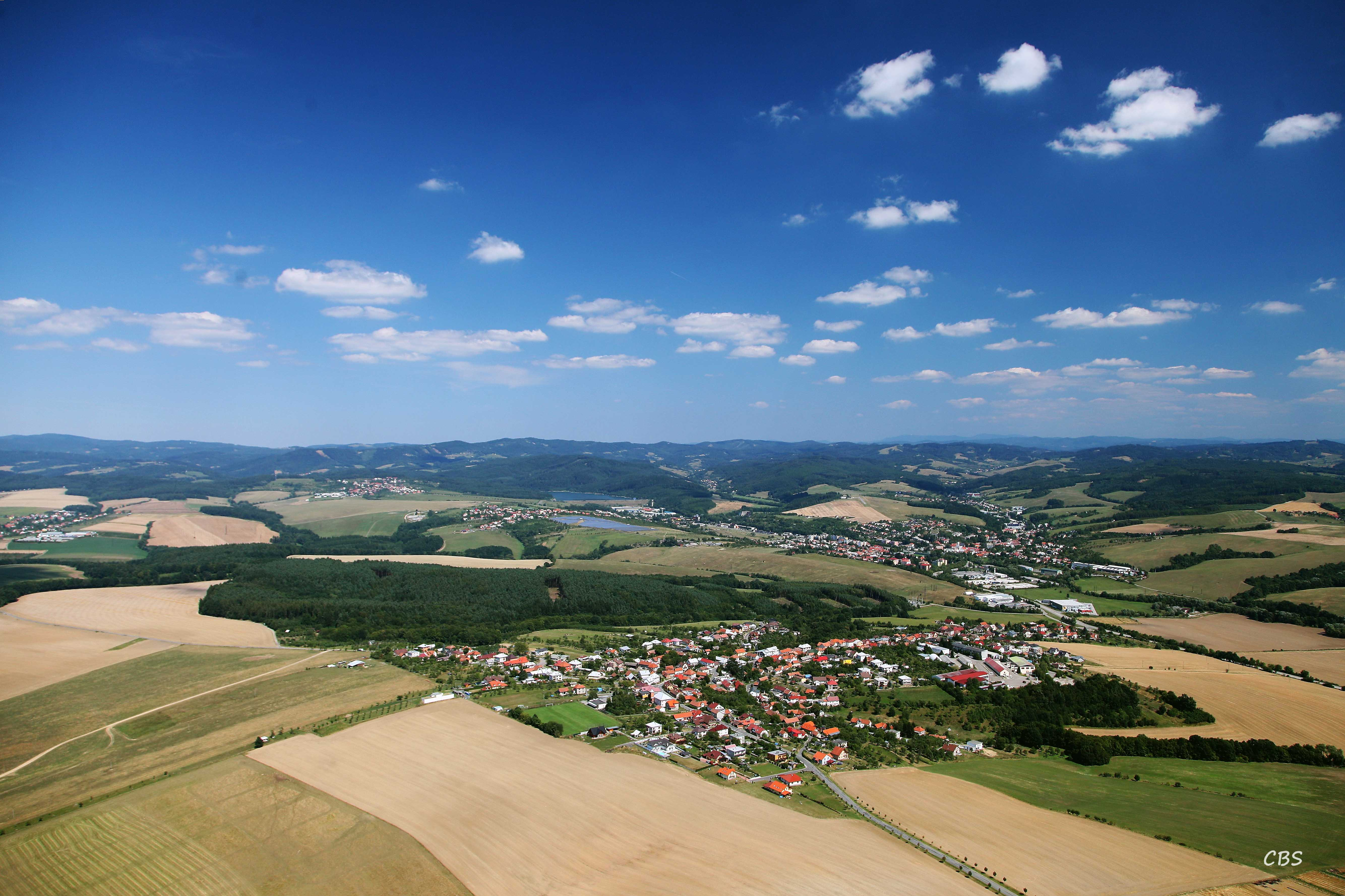
- Aerial view

- Flag Coat of arms

- Location in the Czech Republic
- Coordinates: 49°14′15″N 17°46′32″E
- Country: Czech Republic
- Region: Zlín
- District: Zlín
- First mentioned: 1407

Area
  - Total: 4.44 km^{2} (1.71 sq mi)
- Elevation: 346 m (1,135 ft)

Population (2026-01-01)
  - Total: 860
  - Density: 190/km^{2} (500/sq mi)
- Time zone: UTC+1 (CET)
  - Summer (DST): UTC+2 (CEST)
- Postal code: 763 15
- Website: www.veselauzlina.cz

Veselá is a municipality and village in Zlín District in the Zlín Region of the Czech Republic. It has about 900 inhabitants.

Veselá lies approximately 9 kilometres (6 mi) east of Zlín and 260 km (160 mi) east of Prague.

== Demographics ==
Historical population
Year	Pop.	±%
1869	462	—
1880	502	+8.7%
1890	495	−1.4%
1900	469	−5.3%
1910	551	+17.5%
1921	585	+6.2%
1930	622	+6.3%
1950	693	+11.4%
1961	790	+14.0%
1970	748	−5.3%
1980	717	−4.1%
1991	674	−6.0%
2001	718	+6.5%
2011	800	+11.4%
2021	788	−1.5%
Source: Censuses
