= Vesyoly, Sterlitamaksky District, Republic of Bashkortostan =

Vesyoly Весёлый
- Village
- Location within Bashkortostan Location within Russia
- Coordinates: 53°33′N 55°46′E
- Country: Russia
- Region: Bashkortostan
- District: Sterlitamaksky District
- Time zone: UTC+5:00

Vesyoly (Russian: Весёлый) is a rural locality (a village) in Oktyabrsky Selsoviet, Sterlitamaksky District, Bashkortostan, Russia. The population was 296 as of 2010. There are 5 streets.

== Geography ==
Vesyoly is located 16 km southwest of Sterlitamak (the district's administrative centre) by road. Preobrazhenovka is the nearest rural locality.
