= Jarmila Veselá =

Czech criminal lawyer and professor

Jarmila Veselá (29 November 1899 in Prague – 2 January 1972 in Prague) was a Czechoslovak criminal lawyer, first associate professor at the Faculty of Law of the Charles University in Prague. During the protectorate period when the Czech universities were closed, she became head of the criminal-biological department of the Czech Eugenic Society, a member of which was already before the war, and after 1942 an assistant at the Criminological Institute of the Faculty of Law of the German University.
