= Veselá (Pelhřimov District) =

- Municipality
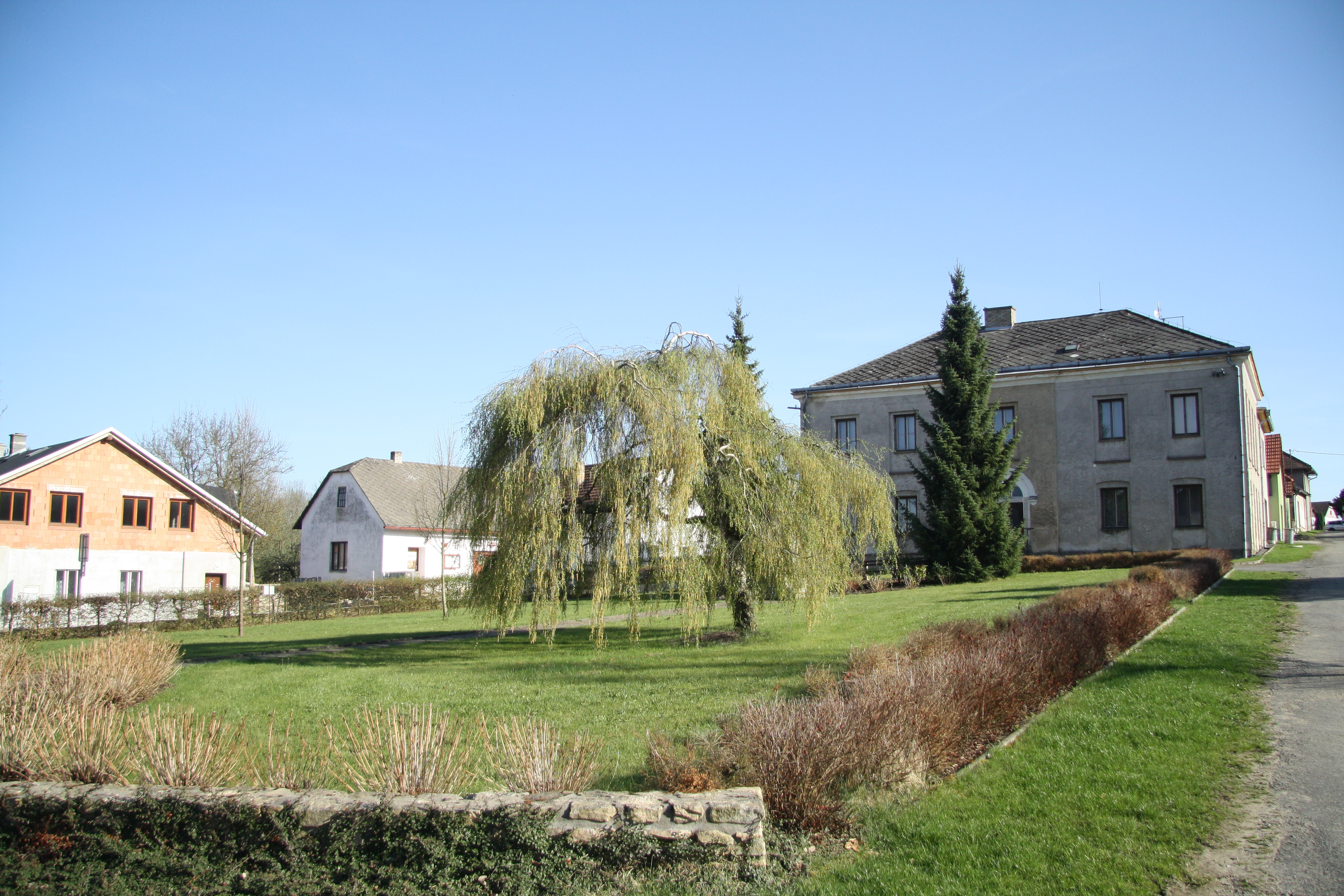
- Centre of Veselá

- Flag Coat of arms

- Location in the Czech Republic
- Coordinates: 49°19′9″N 15°13′36″E
- Country: Czech Republic
- Region: Vysočina
- District: Pelhřimov
- First mentioned: 1359

Area
  - Total: 8.69 km^{2} (3.36 sq mi)
- Elevation: 621 m (2,037 ft)

Population (2026-01-01)
  - Total: 232
  - Density: 26.7/km^{2} (69.1/sq mi)
- Time zone: UTC+1 (CET)
  - Summer (DST): UTC+2 (CEST)
- Postal code: 394 70
- Website: www.obecvesela.cz

Veselá is a municipality and village in Pelhřimov District in the Vysočina Region of the Czech Republic. It has about 200 inhabitants.

Veselá lies approximately 13 kilometres (8 mi) south of Pelhřimov, 28 km (17 mi) west of Jihlava, and 103 km (64 mi) south-east of Prague.

== Demographics ==
Historical population
Year	Pop.	±%
1869	440	—
1880	451	+2.5%
1890	478	+6.0%
1900	452	−5.4%
1910	427	−5.5%
1921	391	−8.4%
1930	335	−14.3%
1950	246	−26.6%
1961	246	+0.0%
1970	244	−0.8%
1980	267	+9.4%
1991	258	−3.4%
2001	243	−5.8%
2011	218	−10.3%
2021	219	+0.5%
Source: Censuses
