= Veselá (Rokycany District) =

- Municipality
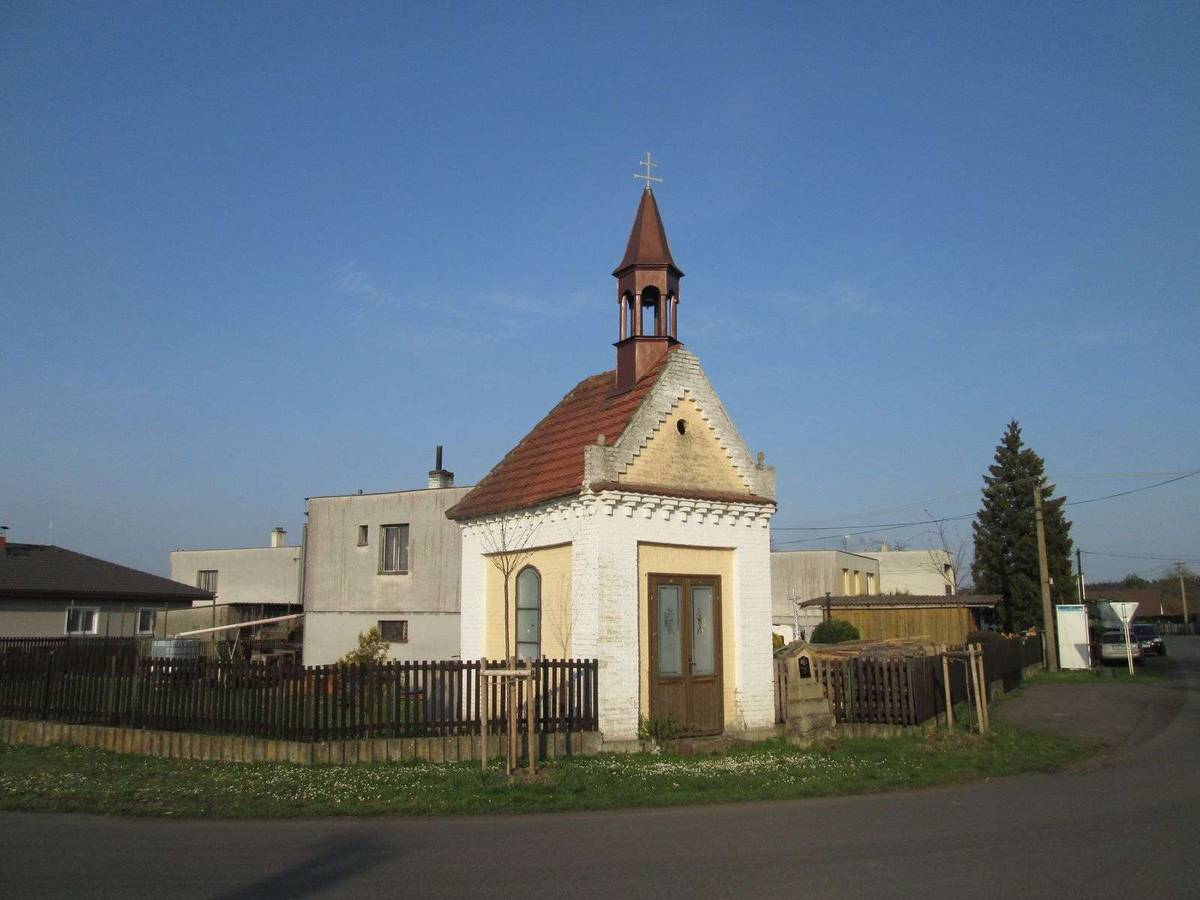
- Chapel of the Holy Family

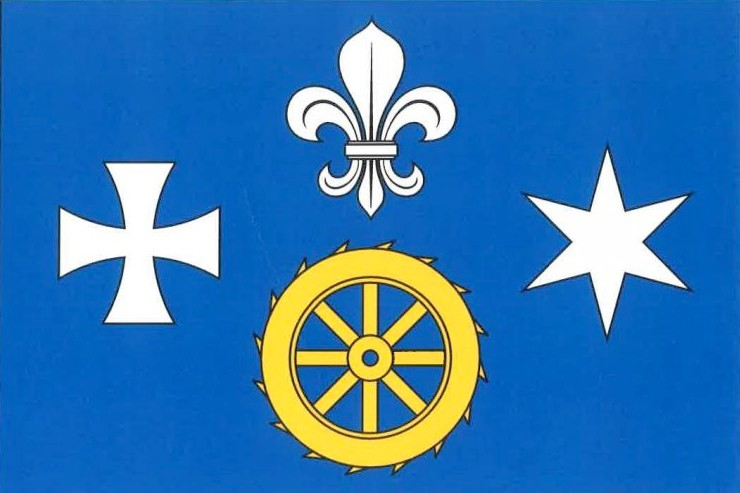
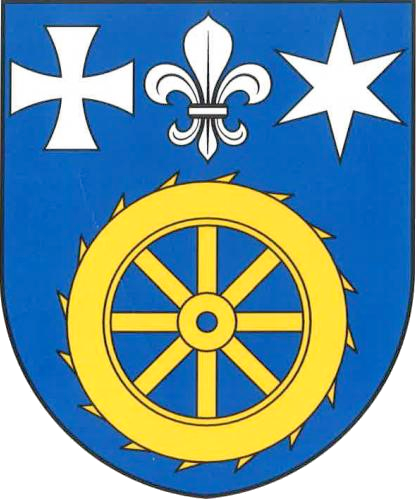
- Flag Coat of arms

- Location in the Czech Republic
- Coordinates: 49°41′43″N 13°36′10″E
- Country: Czech Republic
- Region: Plzeň
- District: Rokycany
- First mentioned: 1352

Area
  - Total: 3.06 km^{2} (1.18 sq mi)
- Elevation: 447 m (1,467 ft)

Population (2026-01-01)
  - Total: 321
  - Density: 105/km^{2} (272/sq mi)
- Time zone: UTC+1 (CET)
  - Summer (DST): UTC+2 (CEST)
- Postal code: 337 01
- Website: obecvesela.eu

Veselá is a municipality and village in Rokycany District in the Plzeň Region of the Czech Republic. It has about 300 inhabitants.

Veselá lies approximately 7 kilometres (4 mi) south of Rokycany, 18 km (11 mi) east of Plzeň, and 73 km (45 mi) south-west of Prague.

== Demographics ==
Historical population
Year	Pop.	±%
1869	402	—
1880	440	+9.5%
1890	427	−3.0%
1900	390	−8.7%
1910	341	−12.6%
1921	361	+5.9%
1930	337	−6.6%
1950	258	−23.4%
1961	234	−9.3%
1970	212	−9.4%
1980	185	−12.7%
1991	174	−5.9%
2001	175	+0.6%
2011	272	+55.4%
2021	288	+5.9%
Source: Censuses
