= Vesyoly, Iglinsky District, Republic of Bashkortostan =

Vesyoly Весёлый
- Village
- Location within Bashkortostan Location within Russia
- Coordinates: 54°57′N 56°58′E
- Country: Russia
- Region: Bashkortostan
- District: Iglinsky District
- Time zone: UTC+5:00

Vesyoly (Russian: Весёлый) is a rural locality (a village) in Krasnovoskhodsky Selsoviet, Iglinsky District, Bashkortostan, Russia. The population was 12 as of 2010. There is 1 street.

== Geography ==
Vesyoly is located 59 km northeast of Iglino (the district's administrative centre) by road. Kirovsky is the nearest rural locality.
