= Vesela =

Vesela may refer to:

- Vesela, Bugojno, a village in Bosnia and Herzegovina
- Vesela, Croatia, a village in Croatia
- Veselá (disambiguation), multiple places in the Czech Republic
