= Maykop =

Capital city of Adygea, Russia

Maykop Майкоп
- City

Other transcription(s)
  - Adyghe: Мыекъуапэ
  - Ubykh: Гъакъыва
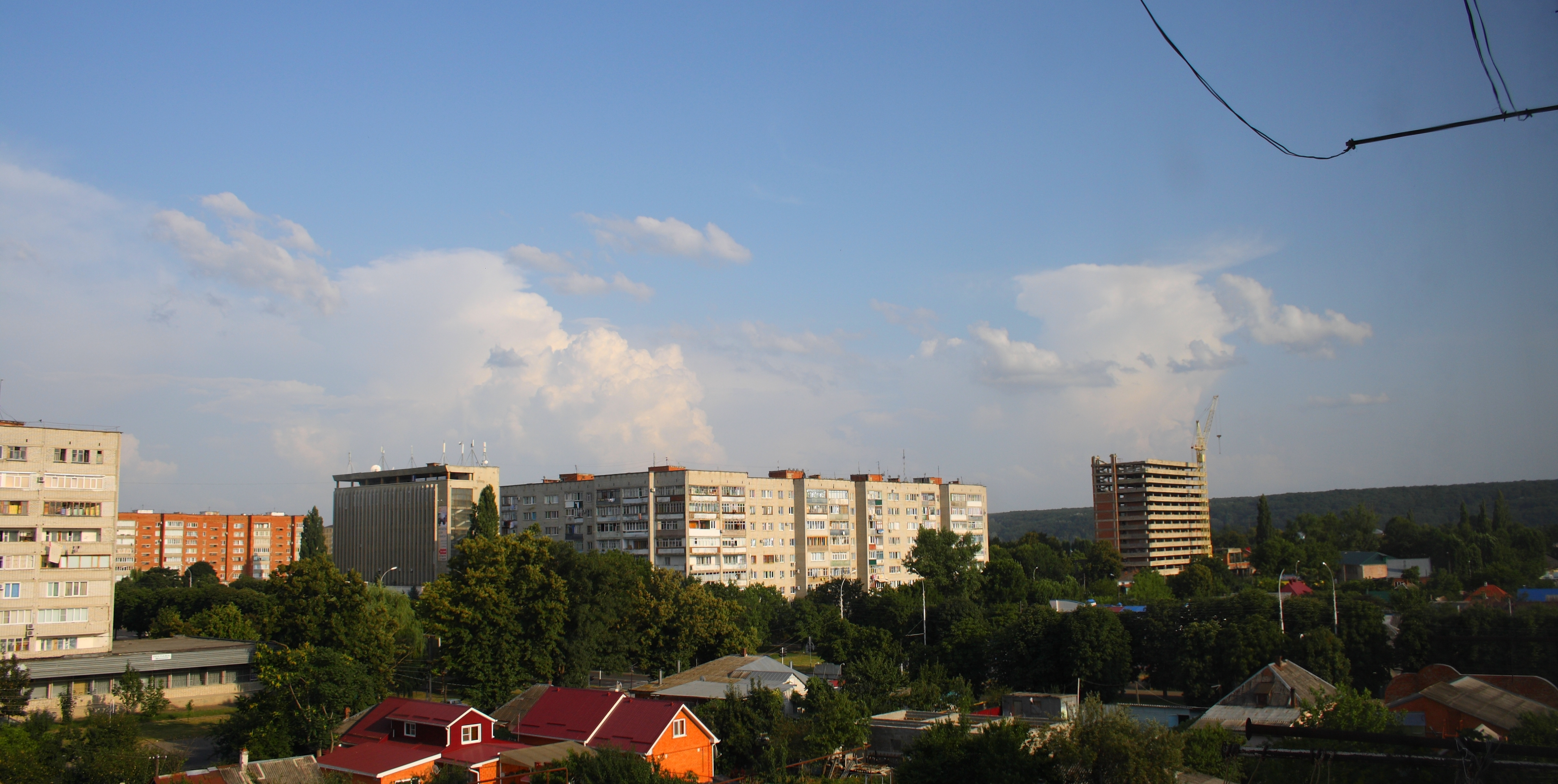
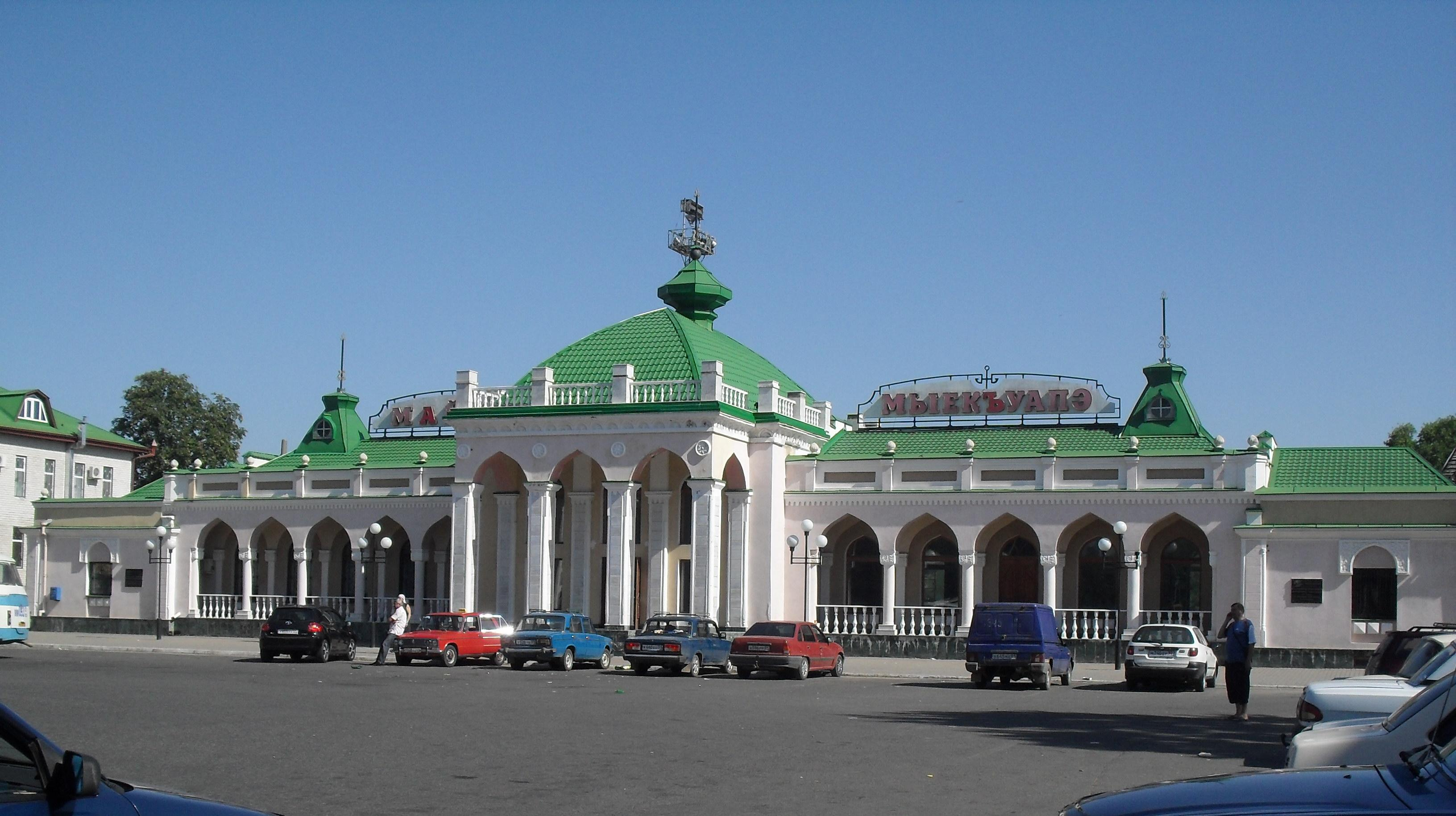
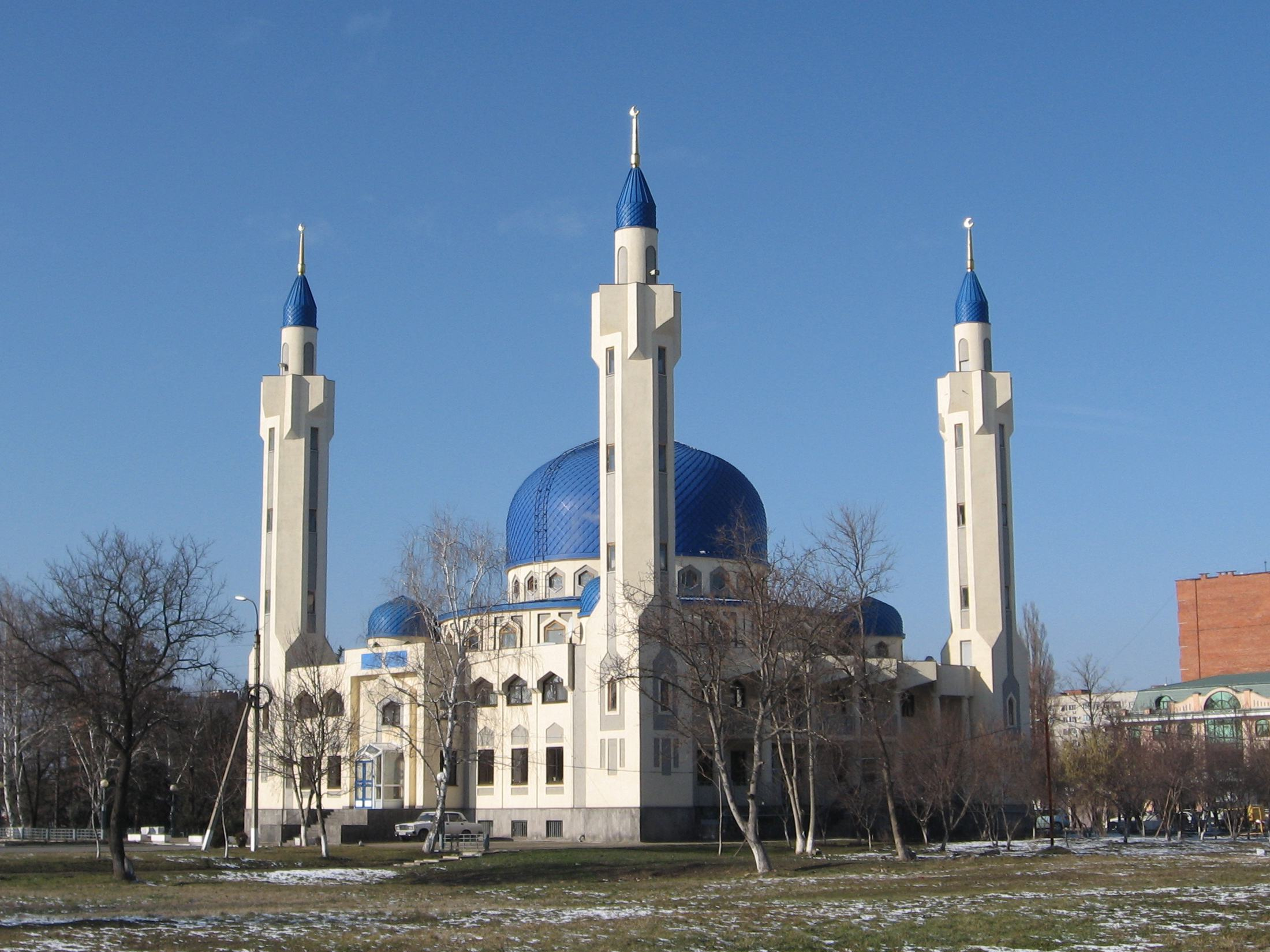
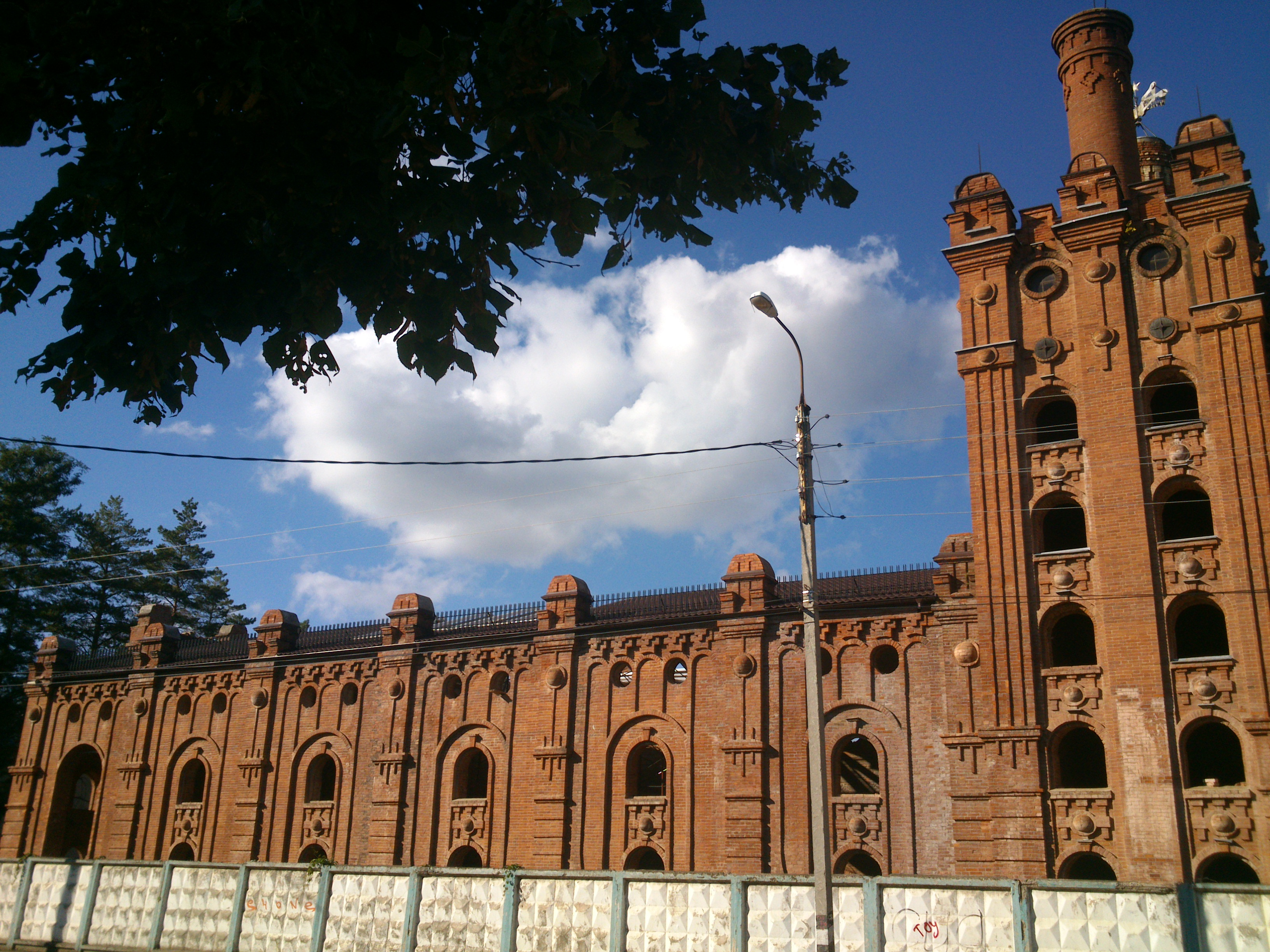
- From the top to bottom, Skyline of Maykop, Maykop Train Station, Maykop Grand Mosque, Maykop Brewery

- Flag Coat of arms
- Interactive map of Maykop
- Location of Maykop Maykop (European Russia) Maykop (Caucasus Mountains) Maykop (Black Sea) Maykop (Russia) Maykop (Europe)
- Coordinates: 44°36′N 40°05′E
- Country: Russia
- Federal subject: Adygea
- Founded: May 1857
- City status since: 1870

Government
  - Body: Council of People's Deputies
  - Head: Gennady Mitrofanov

Area
  - Total: 58.62 km^{2} (22.63 sq mi)
- Elevation: 220 m (720 ft)

Population (2010 Census)
  - Total: 144,249
  - Estimate (2025): 137,899 (−4.4%)
  - Rank: 120th in 2010
  - Density: 2,461/km^{2} (6,373/sq mi)

Administrative status
  - Subordinated to: Maykop Republican Urban Okrug
  - Capital of: Republic of Adygea
  - Capital of: Maykop Republican Urban Okrug

Municipal status
  - Urban okrug: Maykop Urban Okrug
  - Capital of: Maykop Urban Okrug
- Time zone: UTC+3 (MSK)
- Postal code: 385000
- Dialing code: +7 8772
- OKTMO ID: 79701000001
- City Day: First Saturday of June
- Website: web.archive.org/web/20020604231940/http://www.admins.maykop.ru/

Maykop (/meɪˈkɒp, maɪ-/) (Note: Adyghe: Мыекъуап; IPA: [mɘjɐqʷaːpɐ́]; Russian: Майкоп, IPA: [mɐj'kop]) is the capital city of Adygea, Russia, located on the right bank of the Belaya River. It borders Maykopsky District, from which it is administratively and municipally independent, to the east and south; Giaginsky District to the north, and Belorechensky District of Krasnodar Krai to the west.

Population: 143,385 (2021 census); 144,249 (2010 census); 156,931 (2002 census); 148,608 (1989 Soviet census).

Historical population
Year	Pop.	±%
1897	34,300	—
1926	52,525	+53.1%
1939	55,871	+6.4%
1959	82,135	+47.0%
1970	110,212	+34.2%
1979	127,828	+16.0%
1989	148,608	+16.3%
2002	156,931	+5.6%
2010	144,249	−8.1%
2021	143,385	−0.6%
Source: Census data

== History ==
The city gave its name to the early Bronze Age Maykop culture after the discovery of a royal burial site there in 1897.

Following the establishment of a military camp in 1825, the Imperial Russian Army built a military fort at Maykop in 1857.

In 1910 oil deposits were discovered in the vicinity of Maykop. The city was the administrative center of the Maykopsky Otdel of the Kuban Oblast.

In 1936, Maykop and the surrounding region merged with Adyghe Autonomous Oblast and became the administrative centre of the autonomy. The Wehrmacht occupied Maykop on 10 August 1942 without a fight as a result of a commando operation by the Brandenburgers during the Battle of the Caucasus. German attempts to re-start oil production in the scorched-earth area proved only minimally successful. On 29 January 1943, the Transcaucasian Front of the Red Army re-took the town.

Since 1991 Maykop has served as the capital of the Republic of Adygea in the Russian Federation.

== Economy ==
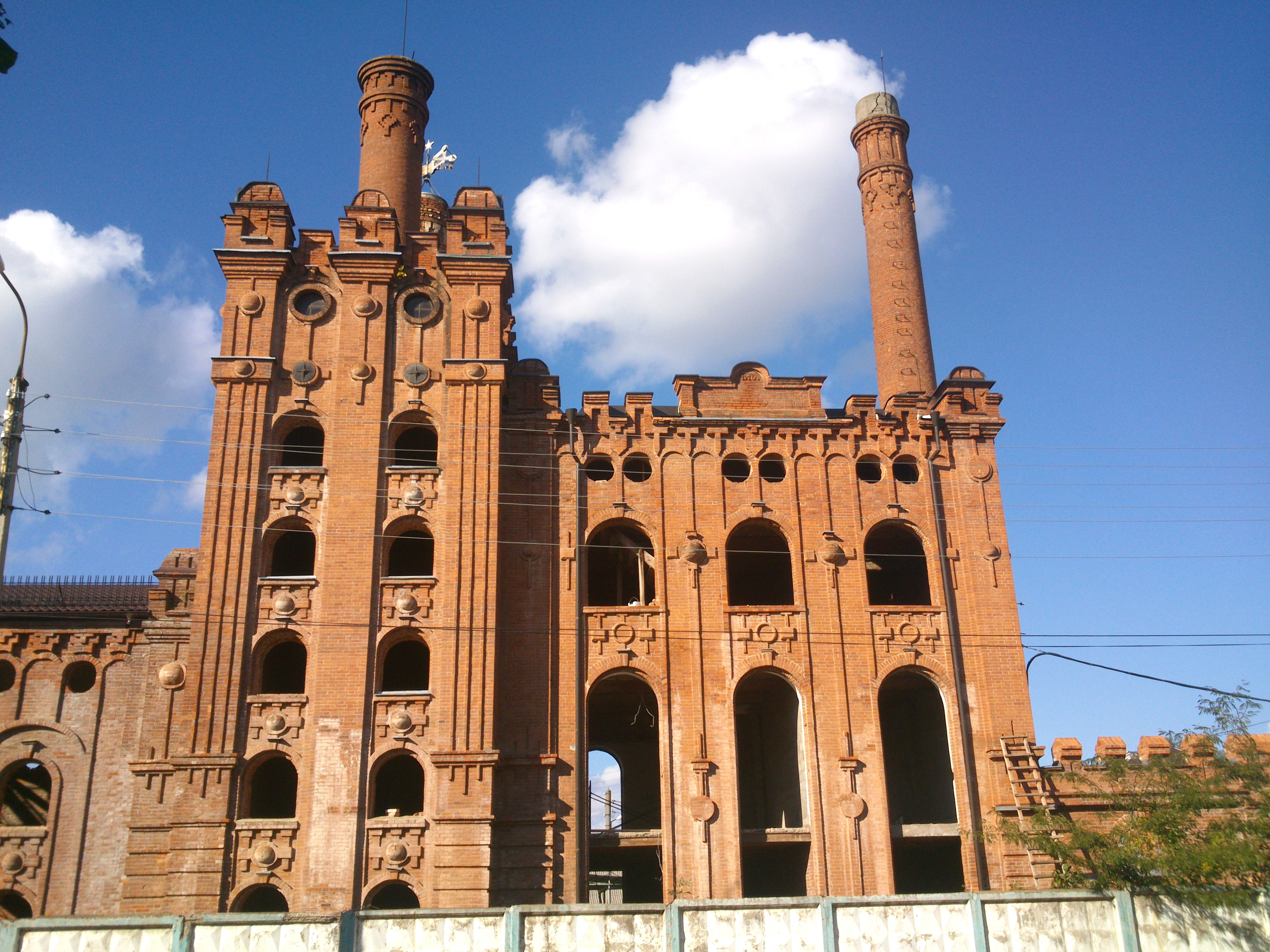
Brewery (cultural heritage)

The discovery of extensive underground oil reserves has made Maykop a major centre for oil extraction for the Soviet Union and, subsequently, Russia. Other economically important sectors are food processing and the timber industry.

== Administrative and municipal status ==
Within the framework of administrative divisions, it is, together with eight rural localities, incorporated as Maykop Republican Urban Okrug—an administrative unit with the status equal to that of the districts. It has the following rural localities under its jurisdiction:

- khutor of Gaverdovsky
- stanitsa of Khanskaya
- khutor of Kosinov
- settlement of Podgorny
- settlement of Rodnikovy
- settlement of Severny
- khutor of Vesyoly
- settlement of Zapadny

As a municipal division, Maykop Republican Urban Okrug is incorporated as Maykop Urban Okrug.

== Ethnic groups ==
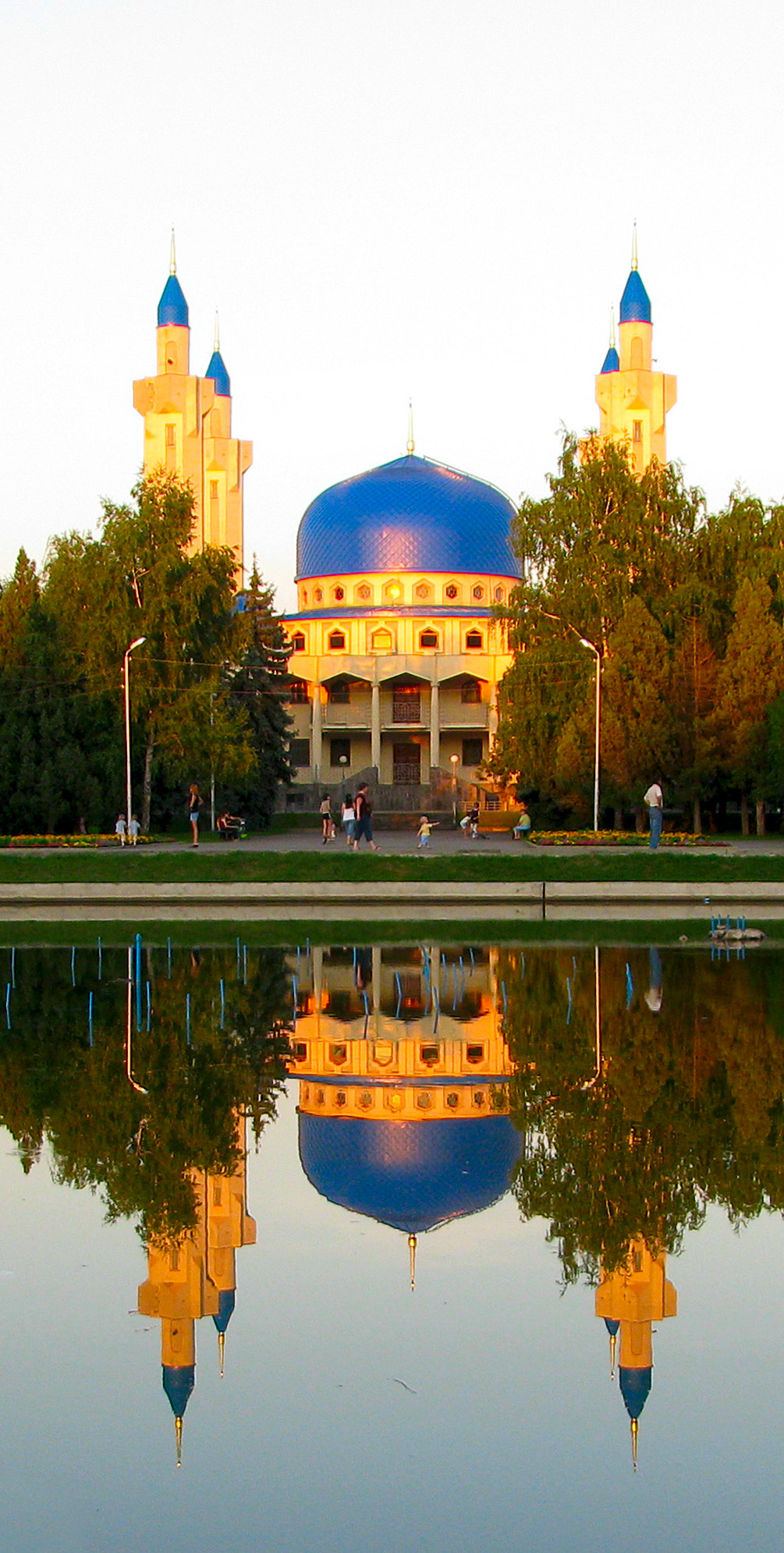
Grand Mosque of Maykop

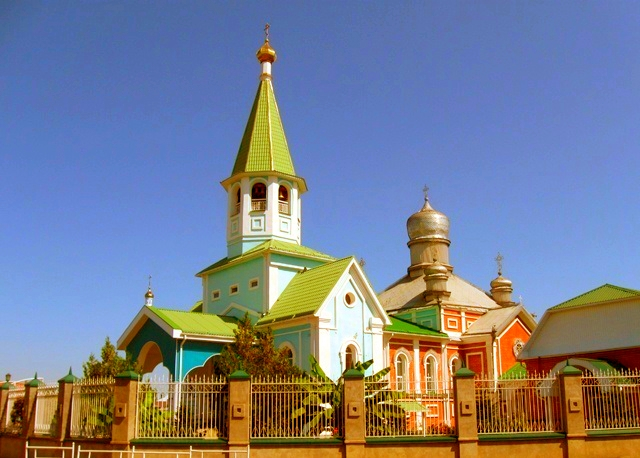
Holy Trinity Orthodox cathedral

Ethnic groups in Maykop (2010):

Ethnicity	Population	Percentage
Russians	96 119	71,29%
Adyghe	26 584	18,19%
Armenians	4 085	3,03%
Ukrainians	2 537	1,88%
Cherkess	1 812	1,34%
Tatars	895	0,66%
Belarusians	530	0,39%
Chechens	448	0,33%
Azerbaijanis	339	0,25%
Caucasus Greeks	312	0,23%
Kabardians	246	0,18%
Georgians	241	0,18%
Germans	235	0,17%
Romani	201	0,15%
Ingush	155	0,11%
Ossetians	152	0,11%
Abkhaz	136	0,10%
Uzbeks	102	0,08%
Others	1 757	1,30%

Ethnic groups in Maykop (2020):

Ethnicity	Population	Percentage
Russians	84 913	59,22%
Adyghe	20 339	14,18%
Cherkess	5 750	4,01%
Armenians	3 242	2,26%
Ukrainians	925	0,65%
Tatars	556	0,39%
Turkmens	461	0,32%
Chechens	363	0,25%
Azerbaijanis	302	0,21%
Others	26 534	18,31%

== Education ==
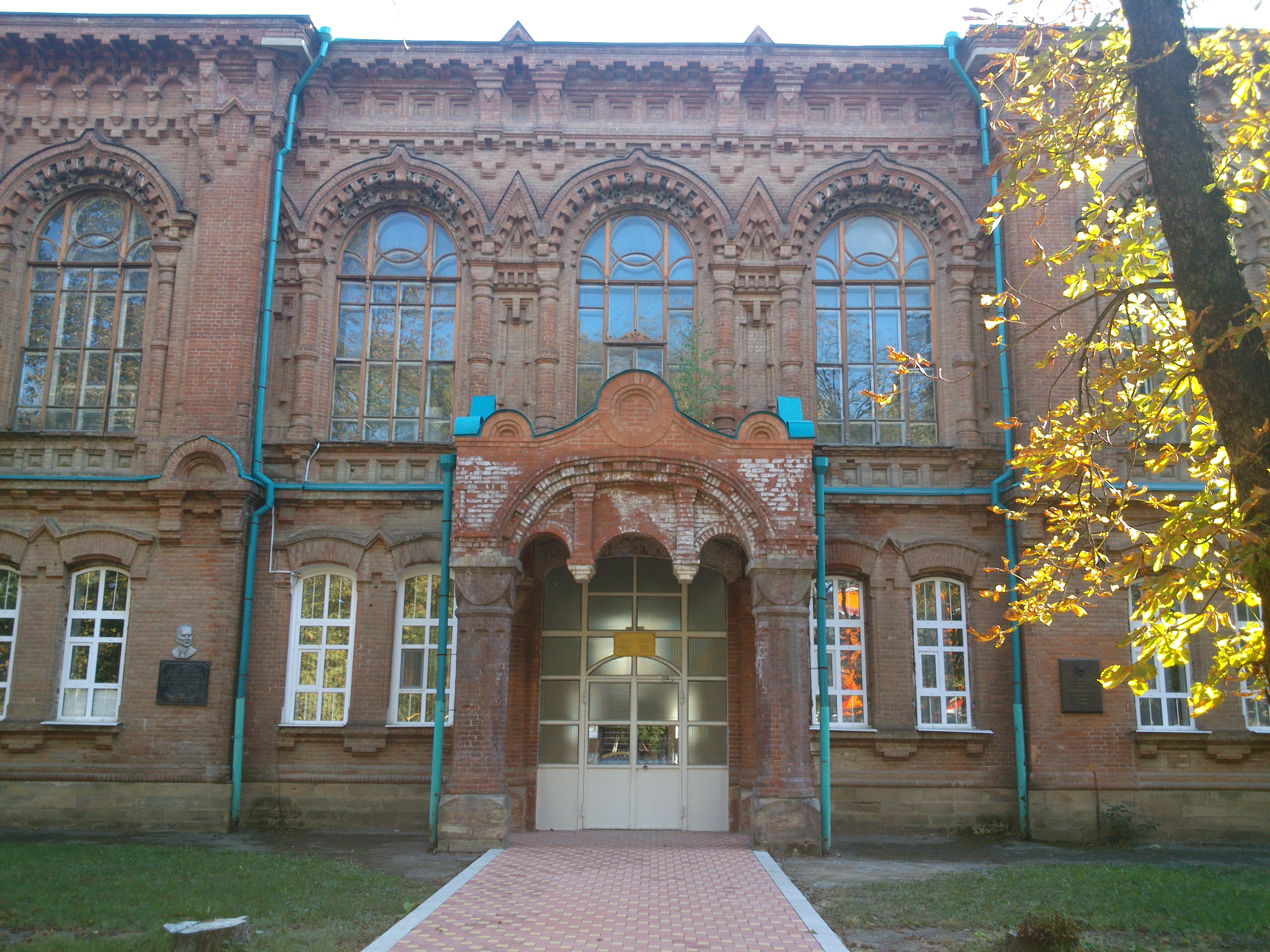
Maykop female grammar school

Maykop is home to the Adyghe State University and Maykop State Technological University. There are also several facilities of professional education in Maykop. There are many schools. For example, Adyghe Republican Gymnasium which is located near the mosque, the theatre and the park of friendship. It has 11 grades. There are many rules: students must wear a uniform, girls must have pony tails or braids. The school has five buildings. There is a sports hall where students play basketball and volleyball. There is also a football pitch where boys play football. A canteen is a separate building.

== Geography ==
=== Climate ===
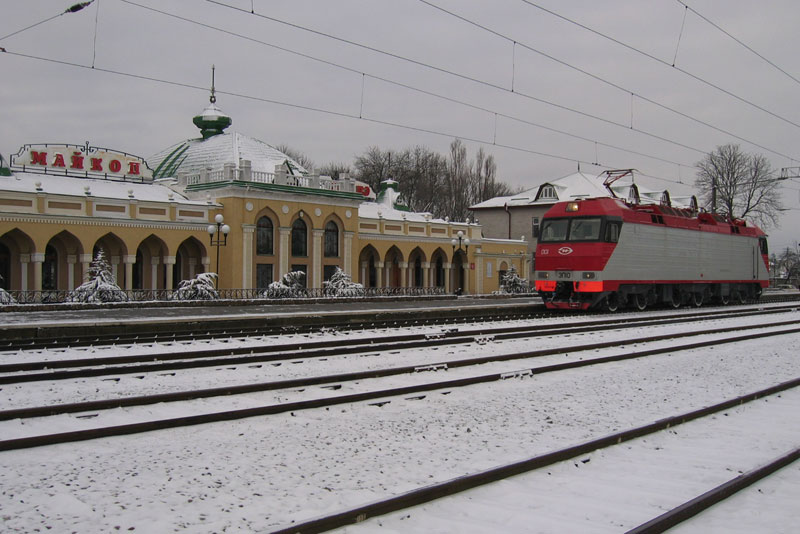
Maykop Railway station

Maykop lies within the humid subtropical climate zone (Cfa), according to the Köppen climate classification, or just within the humid continental climate (Dfa) zone according to the 0 °C (32 °F) isotherm.

Climate data for Maykop (1991-2020)
Month	Jan	Feb	Mar	Apr	May	Jun	Jul	Aug	Sep	Oct	Nov	Dec	Year
Daily mean °C (°F)	0.5 (32.9)	1.5 (34.7)	6.1 (43.0)	11.7 (53.1)	16.7 (62.1)	20.7 (69.3)	23.5 (74.3)	23.2 (73.8)	18.2 (64.8)	12.4 (54.3)	6.1 (43.0)	2 (36)	11.9 (53.4)
Average precipitation mm (inches)	58 (2.3)	47 (1.9)	62 (2.4)	59 (2.3)	87 (3.4)	98 (3.9)	62 (2.4)	64 (2.5)	77 (3.0)	86 (3.4)	71 (2.8)	64 (2.5)	835 (32.8)
Average precipitation days (≥ 1 mm)	9	7	9	9	10	9	6	6	8	8	8	9	98
Mean monthly sunshine hours	89	114	141	196	244	273	312	292	222	167	119	85	2,254
Source: Гидрометцентр России

Climate data for Maykop
Month	Jan	Feb	Mar	Apr	May	Jun	Jul	Aug	Sep	Oct	Nov	Dec	Year
Mean daily maximum °C (°F)	3.9 (39.0)	5.8 (42.4)	11.0 (51.8)	18.2 (64.8)	22.6 (72.7)	26.2 (79.2)	28.9 (84.0)	28.5 (83.3)	24.3 (75.7)	17.6 (63.7)	12.3 (54.1)	6.9 (44.4)	17.2 (62.9)
Daily mean °C (°F)	−0.5 (31.1)	1.3 (34.3)	5.7 (42.3)	12.6 (54.7)	16.8 (62.2)	20.3 (68.5)	22.8 (73.0)	22.3 (72.1)	18.1 (64.6)	12.0 (53.6)	7.6 (45.7)	2.8 (37.0)	11.8 (53.3)
Mean daily minimum °C (°F)	−4.9 (23.2)	−3.3 (26.1)	0.4 (32.7)	6.9 (44.4)	11.0 (51.8)	14.4 (57.9)	16.7 (62.1)	16.0 (60.8)	11.9 (53.4)	6.3 (43.3)	2.8 (37.0)	−1.3 (29.7)	6.4 (43.5)
Average precipitation mm (inches)	60 (2.4)	41 (1.6)	51 (2.0)	58 (2.3)	73 (2.9)	89 (3.5)	70 (2.8)	58 (2.3)	62 (2.4)	66 (2.6)	75 (3.0)	69 (2.7)	772 (30.4)
Average snowfall cm (inches)	27.0 (10.6)	11.1 (4.4)	10.2 (4.0)	0.9 (0.4)	0.0 (0.0)	0.0 (0.0)	0.0 (0.0)	0.0 (0.0)	0.0 (0.0)	0.6 (0.2)	6.7 (2.6)	15.8 (6.2)	72.3 (28.4)
Average precipitation days	8	7	8	8	8	9	7	6	7	7	9	10	94
Average relative humidity (%)	80	76	71	65	69	68	66	66	67	73	75	79	71
Average ultraviolet index	2	2	3	4	5	5	6	6	4	3	2	2	4
Source 1: worldweather.org
Source 2: Weather2visit(Humidity) World Weather Online(Snowfall-UV 2009-2023)

February 15, 2010 saw Maykop record the absolute maximum for any winter month in Russia: 23.4 °C or 74.1 °F.

== Military ==
On the south side of the city, alongside the Belaya River is the military complex housing the 131st Motor Rifle Brigade of the Southern Military District of the Russian Armed Forces which took part in the First Chechen War.

== People ==
- Nikita Kucherov, professional ice hockey player
- Anton Nemkin, politician, entrepreneur and racing driver
