= Vesyolaya, Vashkinsky District, Vologda Oblast =

Vesyolaya Весёлая
- Village
- Location within Vologda Oblast Location within Russia
- Coordinates: 60°23′N 38°04′E
- Country: Russia
- Region: Vologda Oblast
- District: Vashkinsky District
- Time zone: UTC+3:00

Vesyolaya (Russian: Весёлая) is a rural locality (a village) in Roksomskoye Rural Settlement, Vashkinsky District, Vologda Oblast, Russia. The population was 25 as of 2002.

== Geography ==
Vesyolaya is located 24 km northeast of Lipin Bor (the district's administrative centre) by road. Ikonnikovo is the nearest rural locality.
