= Sedletín =

- Municipality
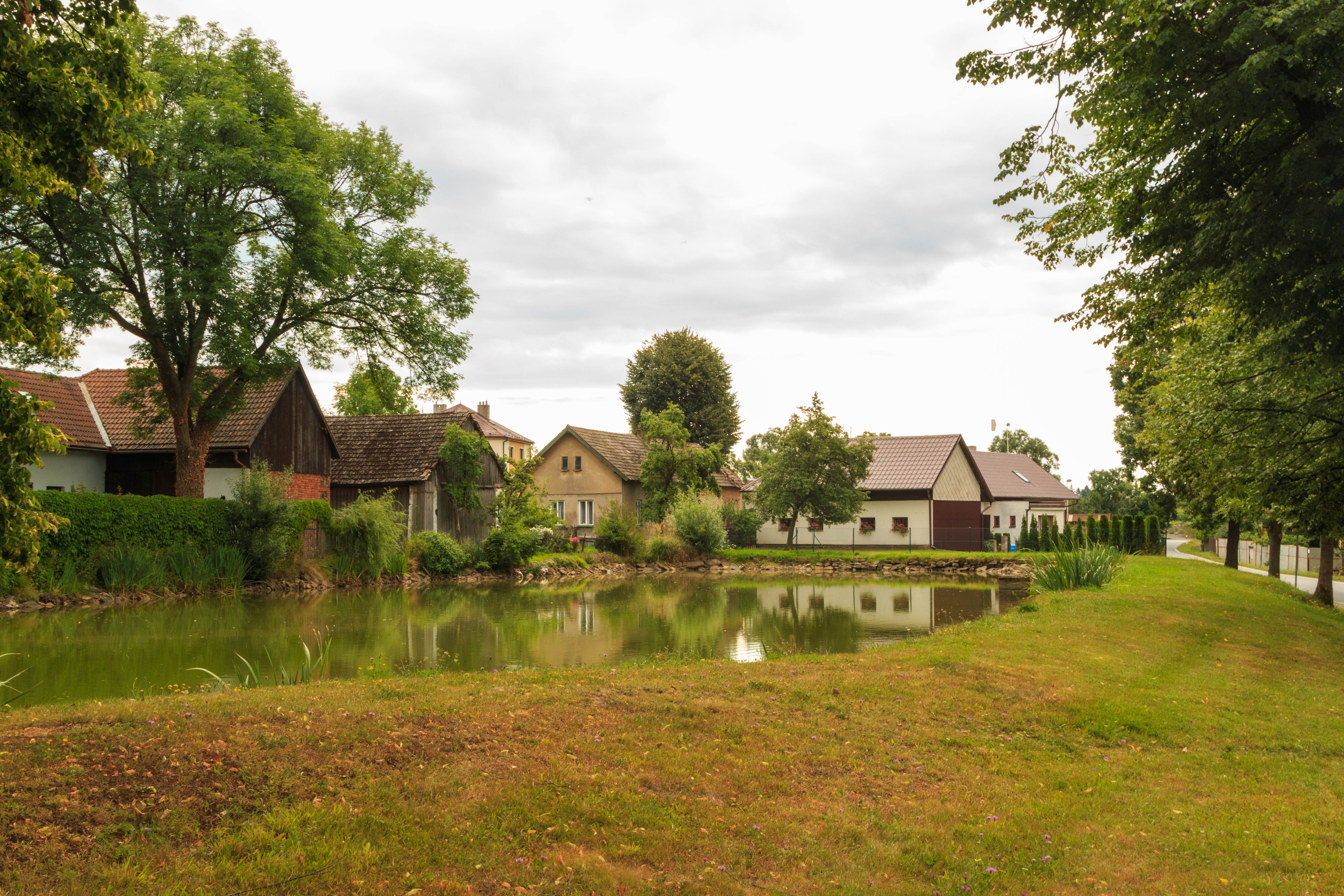
- Veselá, a part of Sedletín

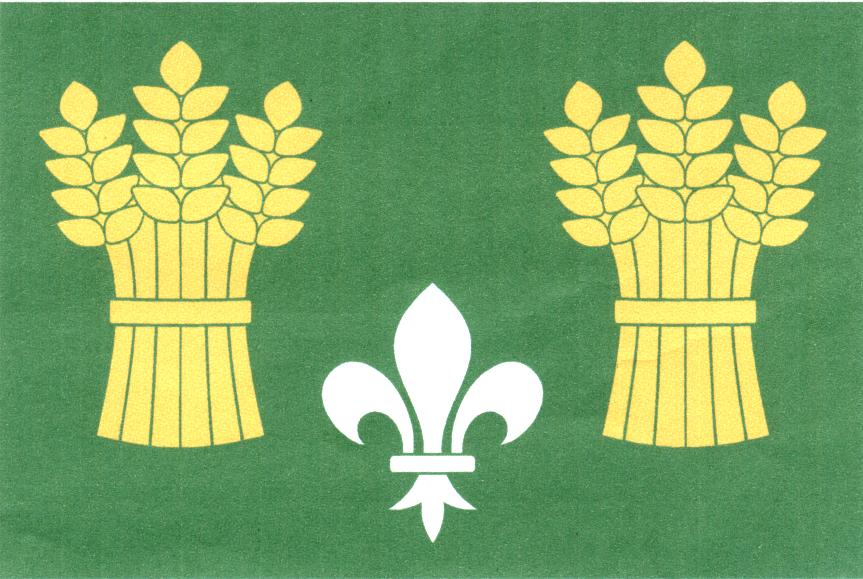
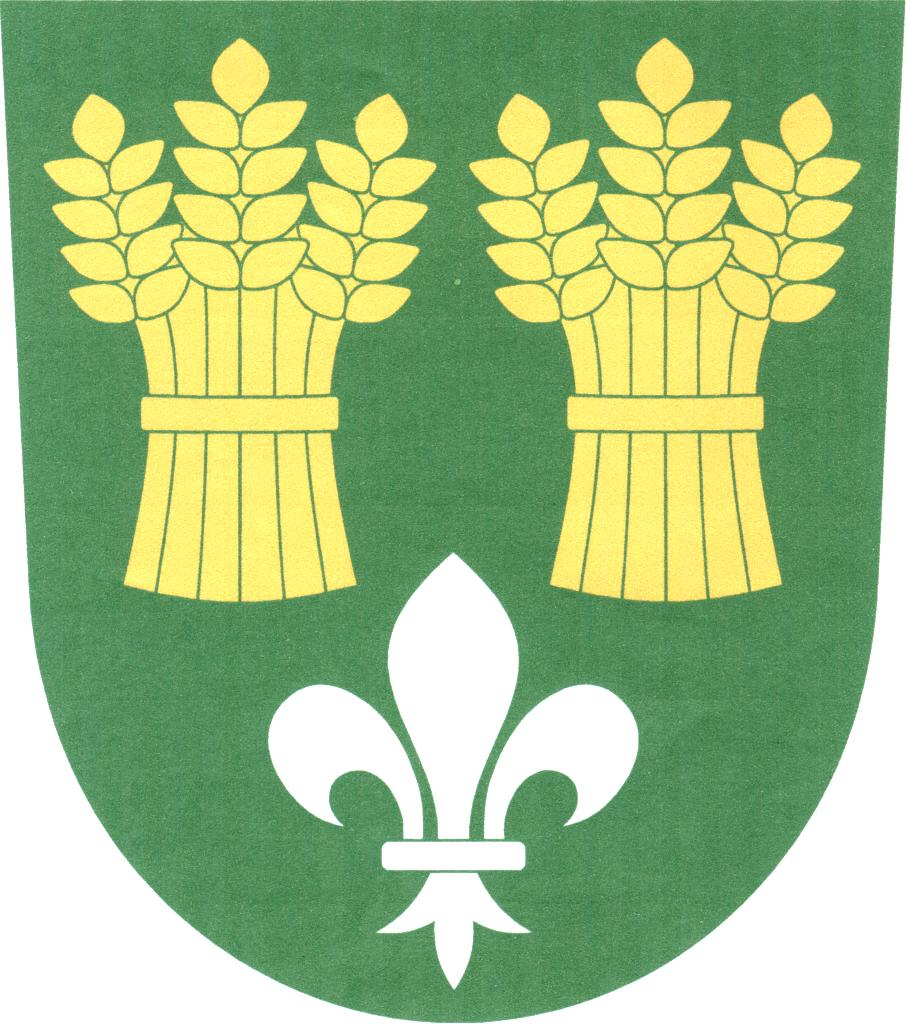
- Flag Coat of arms

- Location in the Czech Republic
- Coordinates: 49°42′31″N 15°33′52″E
- Country: Czech Republic
- Region: Vysočina
- District: Havlíčkův Brod
- First mentioned: 1400

Area
  - Total: 7.27 km^{2} (2.81 sq mi)
- Elevation: 568 m (1,864 ft)

Population (2026-01-01)
  - Total: 302
  - Density: 41.5/km^{2} (108/sq mi)
- Time zone: UTC+1 (CET)
  - Summer (DST): UTC+2 (CEST)
- Postal code: 583 01
- Website: www.sedletin.cz

Sedletín is a municipality and village in Havlíčkův Brod District in the Vysočina Region of the Czech Republic. It has about 300 inhabitants.

Sedletín lies approximately 13 kilometres (8 mi) north of Havlíčkův Brod, 36 km (22 mi) north of Jihlava, and 92 km (57 mi) south-east of Prague.

== Administrative division ==
Sedletín consists of two municipal parts (in brackets population according to the 2021 census):

- Sedletín (168)
- Veselá (113)

== Demographics ==
Historical population
Year	Pop.	±%
1869	542	—
1880	574	+5.9%
1890	524	−8.7%
1900	493	−5.9%
1910	528	+7.1%
1921	492	−6.8%
1930	457	−7.1%
1950	336	−26.5%
1961	337	+0.3%
1970	296	−12.2%
1980	295	−0.3%
1991	295	+0.0%
2001	299	+1.4%
2011	282	−5.7%
2021	281	−0.4%
Source: Censuses
