= Vesyoloye, Amur Oblast =

Vesyoloye Весёлое
- Selo
- Location within Amur Oblast Location within Russia
- Coordinates: 51°18′N 128°18′E
- Country: Russia
- Region: Amur Oblast
- District: Seryshevsky District
- Time zone: UTC+9:00

Vesyoloye (Russian: Весёлое) is a rural locality (a selo) in Arginsky Selsoviet of Seryshevsky District, Amur Oblast, Russia. The population was 84 as of 2018. There is 1 street.

== Geography ==
Vesyoloye is located 33 km north of Seryshevo (the district's administrative centre) by road. Arga is the nearest rural locality.
