= Vesyoly, Kotelnikovsky District, Volgograd Oblast =

Vesyoly Весёлый
- Khutor
- Location within Volgograd Oblast Location within Russia
- Coordinates: 47°49′N 42°59′E
- Country: Russia
- Region: Volgograd Oblast
- District: Kotelnikovsky District
- Time zone: UTC+4:00

Vesyoly (Russian: Весёлый) is a rural locality (a khutor) and the administrative center of Verkhnekurmoyarskoye Rural Settlement, Kotelnikovsky District, Volgograd Oblast, Russia. The population was 922 as of 2010. There are 14 streets.

== Geography ==
Vesyoly is located on the east bank of the Tsimlyansk Reservoir, 34 km northwest of Kotelnikovo (the district's administrative centre) by road. Pokhlebin is the nearest rural locality.
