= Veselé, Czech Republic =

Veselé
- Municipality
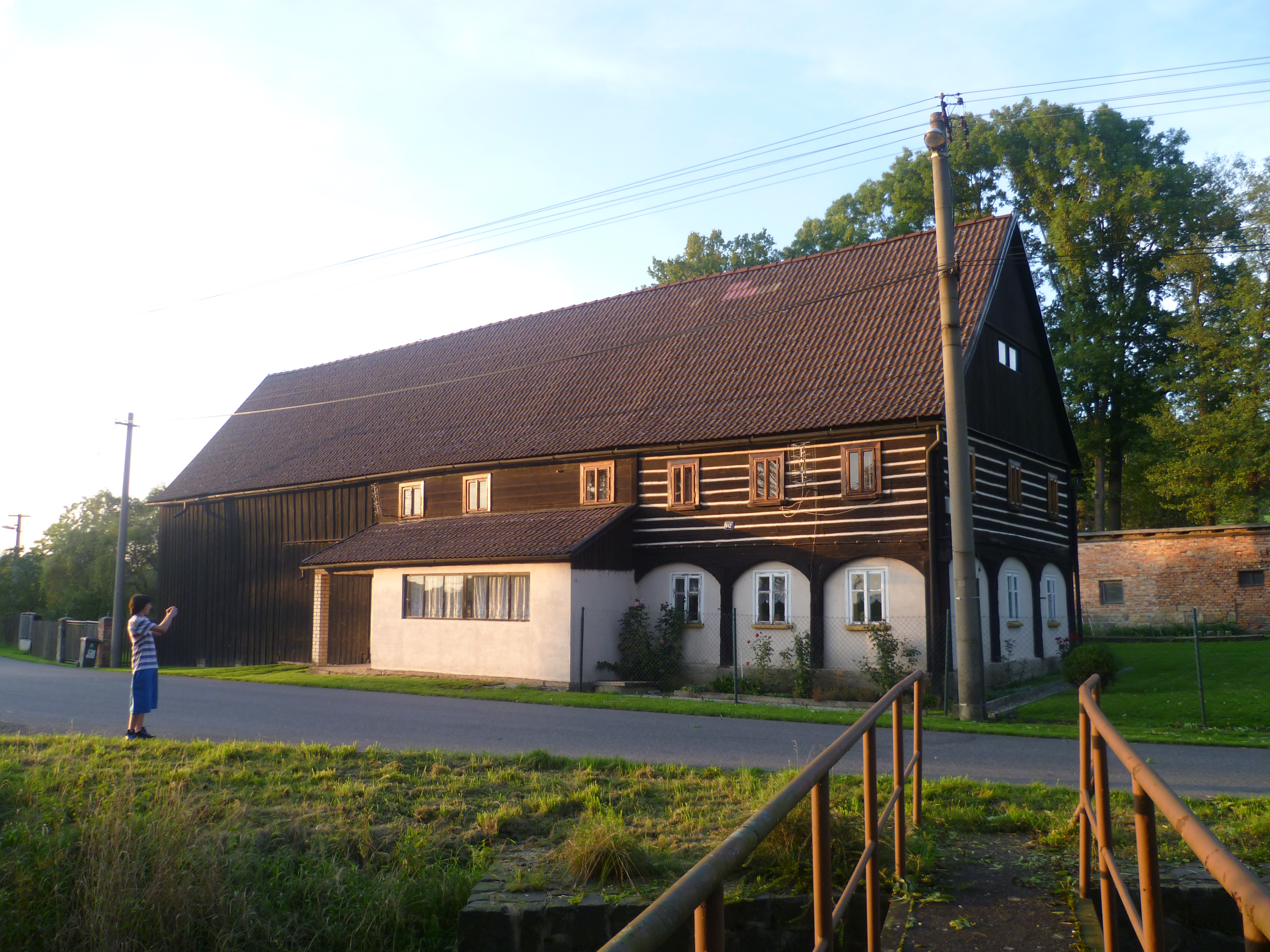
- Half-timbered farmstead

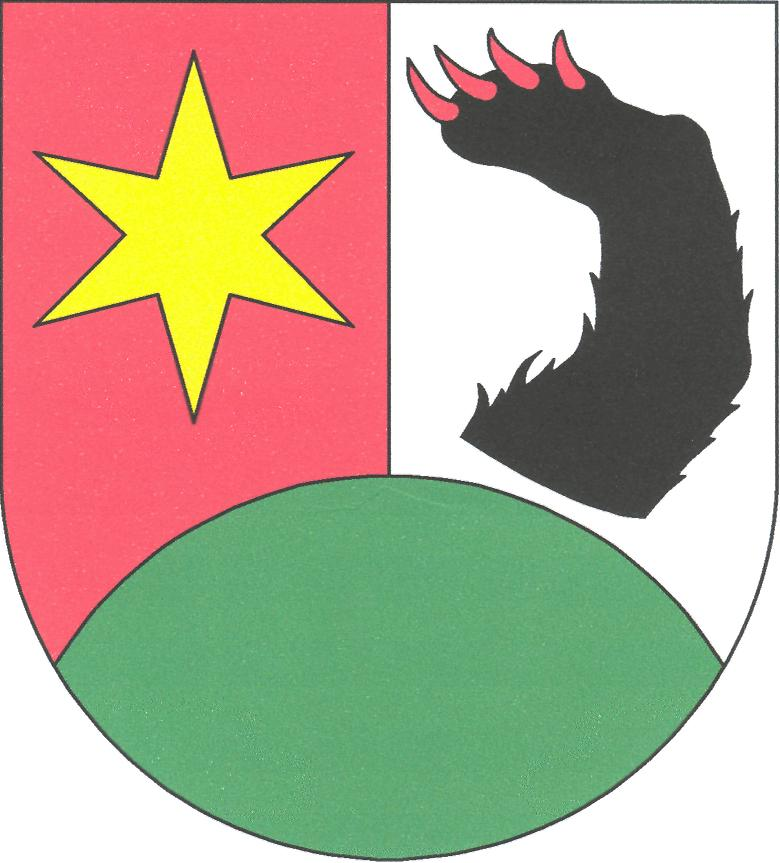
- Flag Coat of arms

- Location in the Czech Republic
- Coordinates: 50°47′5″N 14°22′26″E
- Country: Czech Republic
- Region: Ústí nad Labem
- District: Děčín
- First mentioned: 1381

Area
  - Total: 7.38 km^{2} (2.85 sq mi)
- Elevation: 264 m (866 ft)

Population (2026-01-01)
  - Total: 398
  - Density: 53.9/km^{2} (140/sq mi)
- Time zone: UTC+1 (CET)
  - Summer (DST): UTC+2 (CEST)
- Postal code: 405 02
- Website: www.obec-vesele.cz

Veselé (German: Freudenberg) is a municipality and village in Děčín District in the Ústí nad Labem Region of the Czech Republic. It has about 400 inhabitants.

== Administrative division ==
Veselé consists of two municipal parts (in brackets population according to the 2021 census):

- Veselé (345)
- Veselíčko 1. díl (2)

== Etymology ==
The name literally means 'merry', 'cheerful' in Czech. It was derived from the original German name Freudenberg, meaning 'merry hill'.

== Geography ==
Veselé is located about 11 kilometres (7 mi) east of Děčín and 27 km (17 mi) northeast of Ústí nad Labem. It lies in the hilly landscape of the Central Bohemian Uplands. The highest point is the hill Veselka at 460 m (1,509 ft) above sea level. The village is situated along the Bystrá Stream.

== History ==
The first written mention of Veselé is from 1381.

== Demographics ==
Historical population

Year	Pop.	±%
1869	918	—
1880	890	−3.1%
1890	793	−10.9%
1900	1,141	+43.9%
1910	1,132	−0.8%

Year	Pop.	±%
1921	981	−13.3%
1930	1,041	+6.1%
1950	492	−52.7%
1961	399	−18.9%
1970	364	−8.8%

Year	Pop.	±%
1980	311	−14.6%
1991	229	−26.4%
2001	268	+17.0%
2011	321	+19.8%
2021	347	+8.1%

Source: Censuses

== Transport ==
Veselé is located on the railway lines Děčín–Varnsdorf and Děčín–Rumburk.

== Sights ==
Among the protected cultural monuments in the municipality are a statue of Saint Anthony of Padua from 1712 and a half-timbered farmstead, built in the first half of the 19th century.
