= Vesyoloye, Altai Krai =

Vesyoloye Весёлое
- Selo
- Location within Altai Krai Location within Russia
- Coordinates: 53°03′N 78°52′E
- Country: Russia
- Region: Altai Krai
- District: Slavgorod
- Time zone: UTC+7:00

Vesyoloye (Russian: Весёлое) is a rural locality (a selo) in Slavgorod, Altai Krai, Russia. The population was 36 as of 2013. There is 1 street.

== Geography ==
Vesyoloye lies in the Kulunda Steppe, 13 kilometers (8.1 mi) to the west of lake Maloye Yarovoye and 7 kilometers (4.3 mi) to the NNW of lake Belenkoye.
