= Vesyoly, Novoanninsky District, Volgograd Oblast =

Vesyoly Веселый
- Khutor
- Location within Volgograd Oblast Location within Russia
- Coordinates: 50°30′N 42°35′E
- Country: Russia
- Region: Volgograd Oblast
- District: Novoanninsky District
- Time zone: UTC+4:00

Vesyoly (Russian: Веселый) is a rural locality (a khutor) in Staroanninskoye Rural Settlement, Novoanninsky District, Volgograd Oblast, Russia. The population was 77 as of 2010.

== Geography ==
Vesyoly is located in forest steppe on the Volga Upland, 10 km southwest of Novoanninsky (the district's administrative centre) by road. Rodnikovsky is the nearest rural locality.
