= Vesyoly, Maykop, Republic of Adygea =

Vesyoly Весёлый ЧэфыпI
- Khutor
- Location within Republic of Adygea Location within Russia
- Coordinates: 44°40′N 39°56′E
- Country: Russia
- Region: Adygea
- District: Maykop
- Time zone: UTC+3:00

Vesyoly (Russian: Весёлый; Adyghe: ЧэфыпI) is a khutor in the urban okrug of Maykop, Russia. The population was 680 as of 2018. There are 9 streets.

== Geography ==
The khutor is located on the left bank of the Belaya River, 17 km northwest of Maykop (the district's administrative centre) by road. Khanskaya is the nearest rural locality.
