= Vesyoloye, Belgorod Oblast =

Vesyoloye Весёлое
- Selo
- Location within Belgorod Oblast Location within Russia
- Coordinates: 50°37′N 38°09′E
- Country: Russia
- Region: Belgorod Oblast
- District: Krasnogvardeysky District
- Time zone: UTC+3:00

Vesyoloye (Russian: Весёлое) is a rural locality (a selo) and the administrative center of Vesyolovskoye Rural Settlement, Krasnogvardeysky District, Belgorod Oblast, Russia. The population was 2,156 as of 2010. There are 10 streets.

== Geography ==
Vesyoloye is located 22 km (14 mi) west of Biryuch (the district's administrative centre) by road. Podgorskoye is the nearest rural locality.
