= Central constituency (Krasnodar Krai) =

Central single-member constituency
- Constituency of the Russian State Duma
- Deputy: Igor Bragarnik; United Russia
- Federal subject: Krasnodar Krai
- Districts: Dinskoy (Dinskaya, Krasnoselskoye, Michurinskoye, Pervorechenskoye, Plastunovskaya, Staromyshastovskaya, Vasyurinskaya), Krasnodar (Karasunsky, Pashkovsky, Starokorsunsky, Tsentralny), Timashevsky
- Voters: 525,817 (2026)

The Central constituency (No.49 (Note: Krasnodar constituency No.41 in 1993-1995, Krasnodar constituency No.40 in 1995-2003, Krasnodar constituency No.43 in 2003-2007, Krasnodar constituency No.46 in 2016–2026)) is a Russian legislative constituency in Krasnodar Krai. Currently the constituency covers central and eastern of Krasnodar as well as suburbs, exurbs and rural territories to the east and north.

The constituency has been represented since 2026 by United Russia deputy Igor Bragarnik, former Member of Legislative Assembly of Krasnodar Krai and businessman, who won the open seat left vacant by the resignation of one-term United Russia incumbent Yevgeny Pervyshov in November 2024.

== Boundaries ==
1993–2003 Krasnodar constituency: Dinskoy District, Krasnodar (Karasunsky, Tsentralny, Zapadny)
The constituency was based in metro Krasnodar and covered most of Krasnodar, except Prikubansky City District, as well as suburban Dinskoy District.

2003–2007 Krasnodar constituency: Krasnoarmeysky District, Krasnodar (Prikubansky, Tsentralny, Zapadny)
After 2003 redistricting the constituency retained only central Krasnodar (Tsentralny and Zapadny city districts) and swapped the rest of its territories with former Prikubansky constituency, taking Prikubansky City District as well as suburban to rural Krasnoarmeysky District to the city northwest.

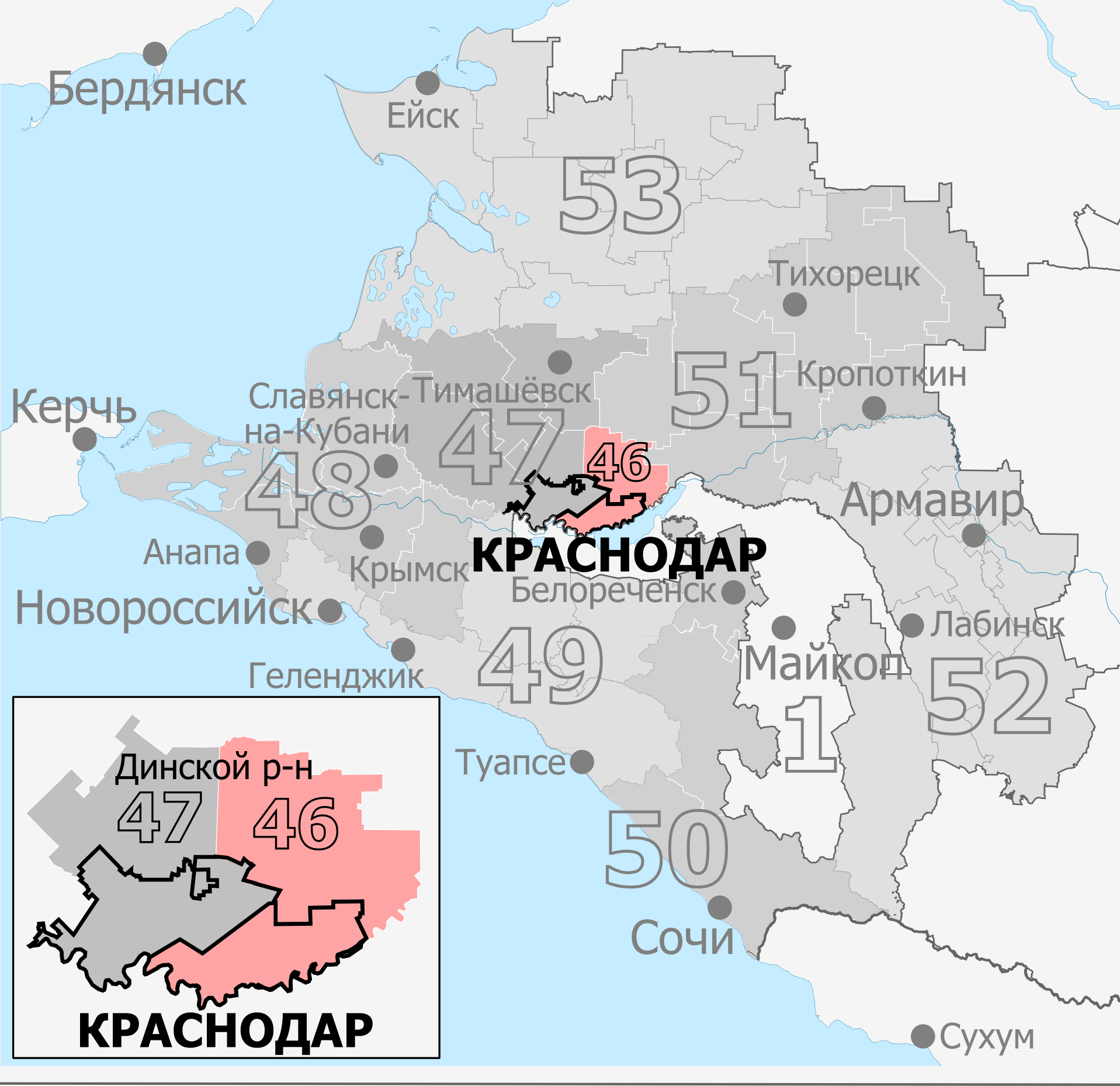
Constituency boundaries from 2016 to 2026

2016–2026 Krasnodar constituency: Dinskoy District (Dinskaya, Krasnoselskoye, Michurinskoye, Pervorechenskoye, Plastunovskoye, Staromyshastovskoye, Vasyurinskoye), Krasnodar (Karasunsky, Pashkovsky, Starokorsunsky, Tsentralny, Zapadny)
The constituency was re-created for the 2016 election and in its new configuration it took eastern half of Krasnodar as well as its suburbs in eastern Dinskoy District.

2026–present: Dinskoy District (Dinskaya, Krasnoselskoye, Michurinskoye, Pervorechenskoye, Plastunovskaya, Staromyshastovskaya, Vasyurinskaya), Krasnodar (Karasunsky, Pashkovsky, Starokorsunsky, Tsentralny), Timashevsky District
After 2025 redistricting the constituency was significantly altered and renamed as "Central constituency". The constituency retained almost all of its territory, losing only Zapadny urban okrug of Krasnodar to new South-Western constituency. Instead the constituency was pushed to the north, gaining rural Timashevsky District from the former Krasnoarmeysky constituency.

== Members elected ==
Election	Member	Party
1993	Sergey Glotov	Independent
1995	Sergey Glotov	Power to the People
1999	Igor Khankoyev	Independent
2003	Boris Kazakov	Independent
2007	Proportional representation - no election by constituency	
2011	Proportional representation - no election by constituency	
2016	Vladimir Yevlanov	United Russia
2021	Yevgeny Pervyshov (Note: appointed Head of Tambov Oblast in November 2024)	United Russia
2026	Igor Bragarnik	United Russia

== Election results ==
=== 1993 ===
==== Declared candidates ====
- Sergey Dementyev (Independent), Kuban State University department of criminal law head
- Sergey Frolov (Independent), construction businessman
- Sergey Glotov (Independent), former People's Deputy of Russia (1990–1993), RVSN colonel
- Nikolay Kotov (APR), kolkhoz chairman
- Gennady Len (Independent), lawyer, cossack army judge
- Tatyana Pavlovskaya (Choice of Russia), investigative journalist
- Sergey Shaydarov (Independent), Head of Dinskoy District
- Yevgeny Smetankin (CPRF), diesel locomotive engineer
- Vladimir Spiridonov (Independent), businessman
- Vadim Tumanov (Independent), physics teacher
- Mikhail Veligodsky (YaBL), chairman of the RPRF regional office
- Natalya Zakharova (DPR), privatization expert

==== Results ====
Summary of the 12 December 1993 Russian legislative election in the Krasnodar constituency
Candidate	Party	Votes	%
Sergey Glotov	Independent	59,677	24.82%
Sergey Dementyev	Independent	–	–
Sergey Frolov	Independent	–	–
Nikolay Kotov	Agrarian Party	–	–
Gennady Len	Independent	–	–
Tatyana Pavlovskaya	Choice of Russia	–	–
Sergey Shaydarov	Independent	–	–
Yevgeny Smetankin	Communist Party	–	–
Vladislav Spiridonov	Independent	–	–
Vadim Tumanov	Independent	–	–
Mikhail Veligodsky	Yavlinsky–Boldyrev–Lukin	–	–
Natalya Zakharova	Democratic Party	–	–
Total		240,395	100%

=== 1995 ===
==== Declared candidates ====
- Vardeks Ayrapetyan (Kedr), Armenian cultural centre director
- Sergey Batura (Independent), Deputy Mayor of Krasnodar
- Vyacheslav Burakov (Forward, Russia!), businessman
- Viktor Danyarov (K–TR–zSS), gas construction executive
- Lidiya Fedoseyeva-Shukshina (DVR–OD), actress
- Konstantin Frolov (Bloc '89), construction businessman
- Sergey Glotov (V–N!), incumbent Member of State Duma (1994–present)
- Vyacheslav Gushcha (Independent), Mayor of Novotitarovskaya (1992–present)
- Igor Khankoyev (NDR), municipal medical and diagnostic association director
- Vyacheslav Paliyenko (Independent), agriculture businessman
- Konstantin Pleshakov (Independent), nonprofit president
- Lyubov Shusharina (Independent), businesswoman
- Olga Solodovnikova (People's Union), aide to Krasnodar City Duma member
- Mikhail Tarasov (BN), corporate executive
- Vyacheslav Temnikov (Independent), First Deputy Mayor of Krasnodar
- Aleksandr Travnikov (Independent), Member of Legislative Assembly of Krasnodar Krai (1994–present)
- Vasily Trotsenko (APR), agricultural union leader
- Mikhail Veligodsky (Yabloko), aide to State Duma member, 1993 candidate for this seat
- Boris Zimin (Independent), businessman

==== Results ====
Summary of the 17 December 1995 Russian legislative election in the Krasnodar constituency
Candidate	Party	Votes	%
Sergey Glotov (incumbent)	Power to the People!	74,837	25.49%
Igor Khankoyev	Our Home – Russia	35,378	12.05%
Mikhail Veligodsky	Yabloko	27,484	9.36%
Lidiya Fedoseyeva-Shukshina	Democratic Choice of Russia – United Democrats	18,026	6.14%
Viktor Danyarov	Communists and Working Russia - for the Soviet Union	17,470	5.95%
Vyacheslav Paliyenko	Independent	17,088	5.82%
Vyacheslav Gushcha	Independent	15,987	5.44%
Konstantin Frolov	Bloc '89	13,938	4.75%
Aleksandr Travnikov	Independent	9,768	3.33%
Mikhail Tarasov	Bloc of Independents	6,847	2.33%
Vardeks Ayrapetyan	Kedr	6,254	2.13%
Vasily Trotsenko	Agrarian Party	3,976	1.35%
Sergey Batura	Independent	3,774	1.29%
Vyacheslav Burakov	Forward, Russia!	3,435	1.17%
Olga Solodovnikova	People's Union	2,482	0.85%
Lyubov Shusharina	Independent	2,325	0.79%
Konstantin Pleshakov	Independent	1,936	0.66%
Boris Zimin	Independent	1,682	0.57%
against all		25,683	8.75%
Total		293,650	100%

=== 1999 ===
==== Declared candidates ====
- Sergey Glotov (ROS), incumbent Member of State Duma (1994–present), October 1996 gubernatorial candidate
- Aleksandr Gorshkov (RSP), nonprofit executive
- Vyacheslav Grishin (DN), Chernobyl Union president
- Vasily Gromov (Independent), Kuban State University department of criminal procedure and prosecutorial supervision head
- Igor Khankoyev (Independent), Member of Legislative Assembly of Krasnodar Krai (1998–present), municipal medical and diagnostic association chief doctor, 1995 candidate for this seat
- Yury Konogray (Independent), agricultural machinery executive
- Georgy Muradov (Independent), former Ambassador of Russia to Cyprus (1996–1999)
- Ivan Ozerov (Independent), agriculture businessman
- Aleksandr Travnikov (Independent), former Member of Legislative Assembly of Krasnodar Krai (1994–1998), 1995 candidate for this seat, October 1996 gubernatorial candidate
- Ildus Salimzhanov (LDPR), entrepreneur
- Mikhail Veligodsky (Yabloko), chairman of the party regional office, 1993 and 1995 candidate for this seat

==== Did not file ====
- Gennady Lizogub (Independent)
- Aleksandr Makarenko (Independent)
- Ivan Sery (Independent)
- Sergey Vorobyov (Independent), unemployed

==== Results ====
Summary of the 19 December 1999 Russian legislative election in the Krasnodar constituency
Candidate	Party	Votes	%
Igor Khankoyev	Independent	96,840	30.90%
Sergey Glotov (incumbent)	Russian All-People's Union	73,973	23.60%
Vasily Gromov	Independent	43,220	13.79%
Mikhail Veligodsvky	Yabloko	26,377	8.42%
Georgy Muradov	Independent	14,416	4.60%
Yury Konogray	Independent	7,187	2.29%
Aleksandr Travnikov	Independent	6,059	1.93%
Ivan Ozerov	Independent	6,006	1.92%
Ildus Salimzhanov	Liberal Democratic Party	4,105	1.31%
Vyacheslav Grishin	Spiritual Heritage	2,640	0.84%
Aleksandr Gorshkov	Russian Socialist Party	2,016	0.64%
against all		27,154	8.66%
Total		313,398	100%

=== 2003 ===
==== Declared candidates ====
- Mamikon Ayrapetyan (Independent), State Duma staffer
- Stanislav Babin (SPS), oil businessman
- Sergey Glotov (Rodina), former Member of State Duma (1994–1999)
- Vladimir Izmaylov (Independent), Member of Legislative Assembly of Krasnodar Krai (2002–present), legal executive
- Mikhail Karakay (United Russia), construction businessman
- Boris Kazakov (Independent), Member of Legislative Assembly of Krasnodar Krai (2002–present), gynecologist
- Yulia Kryazheva (LDPR), legal counsel
- Stanislav Kurkin (SDPR), security businessman
- Gennady Loshkarev (CPRF), businessman
- Sergey Markov (ZRS), nonprofit vice president

==== Withdrawn candidates ====
- Sergey Kopylov (Independent), entrepreneur
- Nafset Melikhova (Independent), union leader

==== Failed to qualify ====
- Ivan Sery (Independent), pensioner, 1999 candidate for this seat

==== Did not file ====
- Vladimir Alekseyev (Independent), militsiya officer
- Yelena Averyanova (Independent), unemployed
- Oleg Buglak (Independent), dentist, orthopedist
- Tamara Chervenko (Independent), teaching methodologist
- Sergey Dikalov (Independent), pensioner
- Nikolay Fyodorov (Independent), corporate executive
- Konstantin Gordeyev (Independent), entrepreneur
- Grigory Klinov (Independent), music teacher
- Larisa Komaricheva (Independent), union leader
- Robert Koren (Independent), nonprofit chairman
- Igor Kozlov (Independent), union leader
- Nikolay Kristya (Independent), businessman
- Vladimir Kust (Independent), pensioner
- Yury Lutsev (KPE), security executive
- Lyudmila Maksimenko (Yabloko), taxpayers' rights advocate
- Stanislav Marchenko (Independent), undergraduate student
- Sergey Melikhov (Independent), security guard
- Andrey Miroshnichenko (Independent), unemployed
- Vladimir Peshkov (Independent), security guard
- Aleksandr Petrosyan (Independent), gym teacher
- Gennady Tkachenko (Independent), warehouse manager
- Igor Ustinov (NPS RF), investigator
- Igor Utin (Independent), locksmith

==== Declined ====
- Igor Khankoyev (NPRF), incumbent Member of State Duma (2000–present)

==== Results ====
Summary of the 7 December 2003 Russian legislative election in the Krasnodar constituency
Candidate	Party	Votes	%
Boris Kazakov	Independent	48,595	18.58%
Mikhail Karakay	United Russia	37,980	14.52%
Gennady Loshkarev	Communist Party	34,457	13.17%
Sergey Glotov	Rodina	31,427	12.02%
Vladimir Izmaylov	Independent	28,818	11.02%
Yulia Kryazheva	Liberal Democratic Party	12,737	4.87%
Stanislav Babin	Union of Right Forces	11,024	4.21%
Sergey Markov	For a Holy Russia	4,768	1.82%
Mamikon Ayrapetyan	Independent	3,125	1.19%
Stanislav Kurkin	Social Democratic Party	2,111	0.81%
against all		40,896	15.64%
Total		262,101	100%

=== 2016 ===
==== Declared candidates ====
- Mikhail Abramyan (CPCR), first secretary of the party regional committee, perennial candidate, 2015 gubernatorial candidate
- Daniel Bashmakov (A Just Russia), former Member of Korenovsky District Council (2004–2010), IT businessman
- Vitaly Katunin (Patriots of Russia), Krasnodar Administration staffer
- Yury Kopachev (Party of Growth), former Member of Legislative Assembly of Krasnodar Krai (2007–2015)
- Sergey Obukhov (CPRF), Member of State Duma (2007–present)
- Natalya Pogorelova (Rodina), college lecturer
- Ilya Shakalov (LDPR), aide to State Duma member Yury Napso
- Andrey Yadchenko (The Greens), construction executive
- Vladimir Yevlanov (United Russia), Mayor of Krasnodar (2005–present)
- Leonid Zaprudin (PARNAS), software engineer

==== Failed to qualify ====
- Oleg Boyarinov (Independent), construction executive
- Viktor Kotlyarov (Independent), lineworker
- Aleksey Pavlov (Independent), nonprofit chairman

==== Results ====
Summary of the 18 September 2016 Russian legislative election in the Krasnodar constituency
Candidate	Party	Votes	%
Vladimir Yevlanov	United Russia	97,209	50.52%
Sergey Obukhov	Communist Party	40,201	20.89%
Ilya Shakalov	Liberal Democratic Party	15,116	7.86%
Yury Kopachev	Party of Growth	8,481	4.41%
Daniel Bashmakov	A Just Russia	6,880	3.58%
Natalya Pogorelova	Rodina	6,648	3.46%
Leonid Zaprudin	People's Freedom Party	3,981	2.07%
Andrey Yadchenko	The Greens	3,543	1.84%
Mikhail Abramyan	Communists of Russia	3,318	1.72%
Vitaly Katunin	Patriots of Russia	2,478	1.29%
Total		192,413	100%

=== 2021 ===
==== Declared candidates ====
- Maksim Barinov (Party of Growth), Member of Timashevsky District Council (2020–present), construction businessman
- Akhmed Besleney (Yabloko), businessman
- Oleg Boyarinov (New People), construction executive, 2016 Independent candidate for this seat
- Vyacheslav Demkin (RPPSS), Member of Timashevsky District Council (2020–present), businessman
- Yevgeny Pervyshov (United Russia), Mayor of Krasnodar (2016–present)
- Ivan Tutushkin (LDPR), Member of Legislative Assembly of Krasnodar Krai (2017–present), 2020 gubernatorial candidate
- Gennady Ufimtsev (SR–ZP), Member of Krasnodar City Duma (2020–present), law firm director
- Vladimir Volynsky (Rodina), attorney
- Sergey Voskoboynikov (GP), housing cooperative chairman
- Marina Zakharova (The Greens), homemaker
- Ivan Zhilishchikov (CPRF), Member of Legislative Assembly of Krasnodar Krai (2017–present)

==== Failed to qualify ====
- Andrey Andreyev (CPCR), unemployed
- Aleksandr Kravchuk (ROS), IT manager

==== Did not file ====
- Dmitry Novikov (Independent), security specialist
- Igor Prokoshev (RPSS), electric and gas welder
- Bogdan Volobuyev (RPSS), unemployed

==== Declined ====
- Vladimir Yevlanov (United Russia), incumbent Member of State Duma (2016–present)

==== Results ====
Summary of the 17-19 September 2021 Russian legislative election in the Krasnodar constituency
Candidate	Party	Votes	%
Yevgeny Pervyshov	United Russia	130,231	53.56%
Ivan Zhilishchikov	Communist Party	45,252	18.61%
Oleg Boyarinov	New People	15,173	6.24%
Gennady Ufimtsev	A Just Russia — For Truth	13,499	5.55%
Ivan Tutushkin	Liberal Democratic Party	8,942	3.68%
Marina Zakharova	The Greens	6,016	2.47%
Vyacheslav Demkin	Party of Pensioners	6,010	2.47%
Maksim Barinov	Party of Growth	4,027	1.66%
Vladimir Volynsky	Rodina	3,750	1.54%
Akhmed Besleney	Yabloko	2,782	1.14%
Sergey Voskoboynikov	Civic Platform	2,429	1.00%
Total		243,157	100%

=== 2026 ===
==== Declared candidates ====
- Arsen Begiyan (New People), entrepreneur, blogger
- Akhmedkhan Bekov (RPPSS), Envoy of Ingushetia to Krasnodar Krai (2017–present)
- Akhmed Besleney (Yabloko), businessman, 2021 candidate for this seat
- Igor Bragarnik (United Russia), Member of Legislative Assembly of Krasnodar Krai (2022–present)
- Timur Grinkov (A Just Russia), businessman
- Natalya Gvozdeva (LDPR), Member of Krasnodar City Duma (2020–present), construction businesswoman
- Nikita Karpovich (The Greens), attorney
- Ivan Zhilishchikov (CPRF), Member of Legislative Assembly of Krasnodar Krai (2017–present), 2021 candidate for this seat

==== Did not file ====
- Mikhail Padiy (Independent), UAV instructor, United Russia primary candidate

==== Results ====
Summary of the 18-20 September 2026 Russian legislative election in the Central constituency
Candidate	Party	Votes	%
Igor Bragarnik	United Russia	181,958	62.20%
Ivan Zhilishchikov	Communist Party	51,636	17.65%
Natalya Gvozdeva	Liberal Democratic Party	20,028	6.85%
Arsen Begiyan	New People	10,121	3.46%
Timur Grinkov	A Just Russia	8,476	2.90%
Akhmed Besleney	Yabloko	6,501	2.22%
Nikita Karpovich	The Greens	5,525	1.89%
Akhmedkhan Bekov	Party of Pensioners	5,425	1.85%
Total		292,550	100%
