= North-Western constituency (Krasnodar Krai) =

Legislative constituency in Russia

North-Western single-member constituency
- Constituency of the Russian State Duma
- Deputy: Dmitry Lameykin; United Russia
- Federal subject: Krasnodar Krai
- Districts: Dinskoy (Novovelichkovskoye, Novotitarovskoy, Yuzhno-Kubanskoye), Kalininsky, Krasnoarmeysky, Krasnodar (Kalininsky, part of Prikubansky), Primorsko-Akhtarsky
- Voters: 476,136 (2026)

The North-Western constituency (No.50 (Note: Prikubansky constituency No.43 in 1993-1995, Prikubansky constituency No.42 in 1995-2003, Dinskaya constituency No.41 in 2003-2007, Krasnoarmeysky constituency No.47 in 2016–2026)) is a Russian legislative constituency in Krasnodar Krai. The constituency stretches from northern Krasnodar to Primorsko-Akhtarsk on the Azov Sea coast.

The constituency has been represented since 2016 by United Russia deputy Dmitry Lameykin, former Member of Legislative Assembly of Krasnodar Krai and journalist.

== Boundaries ==
1993–2003 Prikubansky constituency: Abinsky District, Kalininsky District, Krasnoarmeysky District, Krasnodar (Prikubansky), Krymsk, Krymsky District, Seversky District
The constituency covered western Krasnodar as well as rural areas to the west and southwest of the city.

2003–2007 Dinskaya constituency: Bryukhovetsky District, Dinskoy District, Kalininsky District, Korenovsky District, Krasnodar (Karasunsky), Timashevsky District
After 2003 redistricting the constituency was significantly changed, retaining only Kalininsky District and losing the rest to Krasnodar, Krymsk and Tuapse constituencies. The constituency gained Karasunsky urban okrug of Krasnodar and Dinskoy District from Krasnodar constituency, Bryukhovetsky and Timashevsky districts from Kanevskaya constituency and Korenovsky District from Tikhoretsk constituency as the seat was pushed to the east.

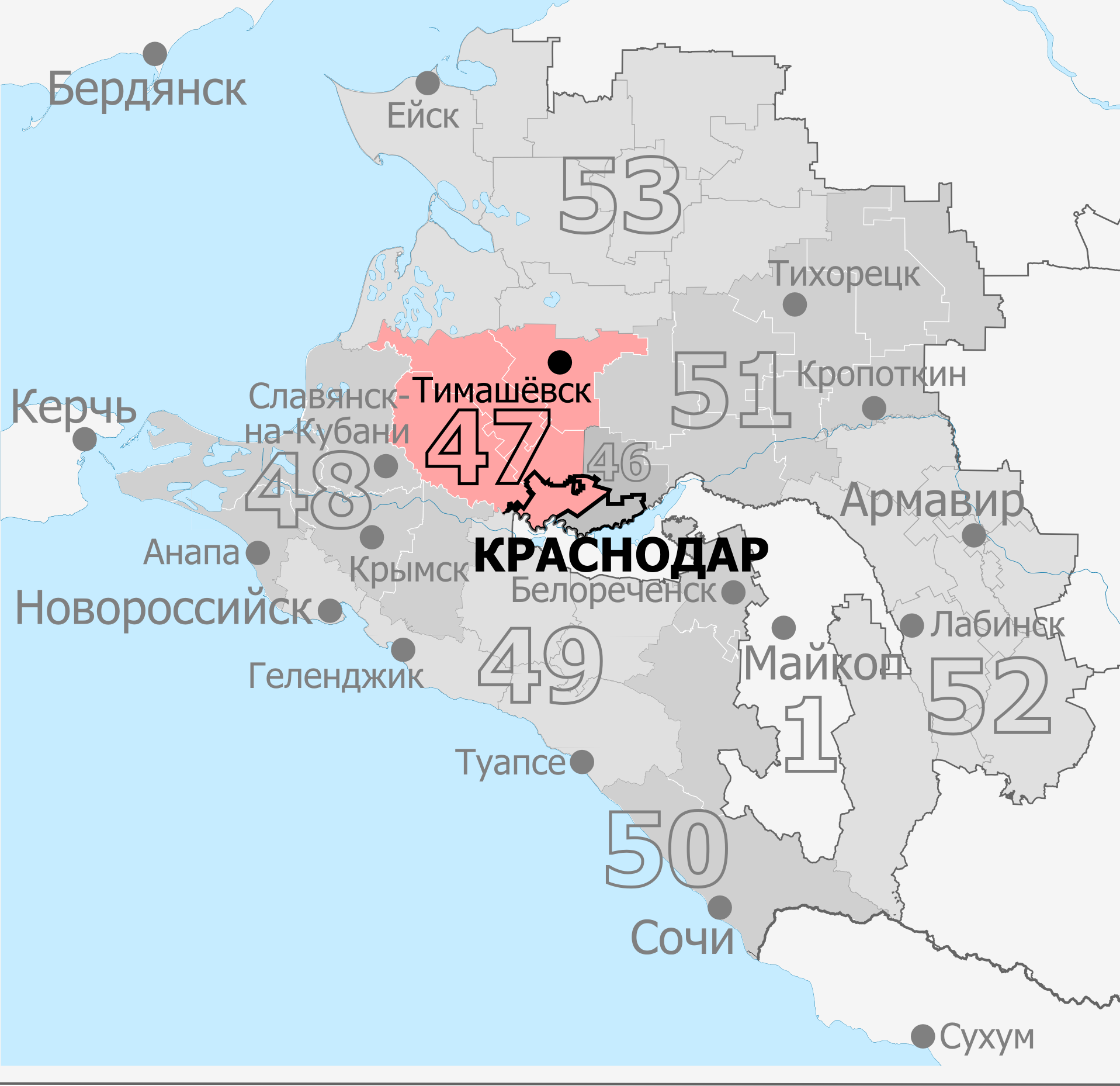
Constituency boundaries from 2016 to 2026

2016–2026 Krasnoarmeysky constituency: Dinskoy District (Novovelichkovskaya, Novotitarovskaya, Yuzhny), Kalininsky District, Krasnoarmeysky District, Krasnodar (Beryozovy, Kalininsky, Prikubansky, Yelizavetinsky), Timashevsky District
The constituency was re-created for the 2016 election under the name "Krasnoarmeysky constituency". This seat retained part of Dinskoy District, Kalininsky and Timashevsky districts, losing the rest of Dinskoy District and Karasunsky urban orkug of Krasnodar to Krasnodar constituency. It instead gained Krasnoarmeysky District and western Krasnodar from Krasnodar constituency.

2026–present: Dinskoy District (Novovelichkovskaya, Novotitarovskaya, Yuzhny), Kalininsky District, Krasnoarmeysky District, Krasnodar (Kalininsky, part of Prikubansky), Primorsko-Akhtarsky District
After 2025 redistricting the constituency was slightly altered and renamed as "North-Western constituency". The constituency retained almost all of its territory, losing western edges of Krasnodar to new South-Western constituency and Timashevsky District to Krasnodar constituency. This seat instead gained Primorsko-Akhtarsky District on the Azov Sea coast from the former Kanevskaya constituency.

== Members elected ==
| Election | Member | Party |
|---|---|---|
| 1993 | Pyotr Kiriy | Agrarian Party |
| 1995 | Yury Polyakov (Note: disappeared in December 1996, the seat declared vacant in June 1999) | Power to the People |
| 1999 | Oleg Mashchenko | Independent |
| 2003 | Vladimir Gorbachyov | United Russia |
| 2007 | Proportional representation - no election by constituency | |
| 2011 | Proportional representation - no election by constituency | |
| 2016 | Dmitry Lameykin | United Russia |
| 2021 | Dmitry Lameykin | United Russia |
| 2026 | Dmitry Lameykin | United Russia |

== Election results ==
=== 1993 ===
==== Declared candidates ====
- Nikolay Alyoshin (Independent), regional agricultural biotechnical centre director
- Vladimir Gritsan (Choice of Russia), attorney, former military prosecutor
- Georgy Ivashkov (Independent), banker
- Pyotr Kiriy (APR), kolkhoz chairman
- Ivan Osadchy (CPRF), history professor
- Nikolay Osokin (DPR), transportation executive
- Vladimir Serdyukov (LDPR), journalist

==== Results ====
Summary of the 12 December 1993 Russian legislative election in the Prikubansky constituency
| Candidate | Party | Votes | % |
|---|---|---|---|
| Pyotr Kiriy | Agrarian Party | 54,495 | 21.46% |
| Nikolay Alyoshin | Independent | – | – |
| Vladimir Gritsan | Choice of Russia | – | – |
| Georgy Ivashkov | Independent | – | – |
| Ivan Osadchy | Communist Party | – | – |
| Nikolay Osokin | Democratic Party | – | – |
| Vladimir Serdyukov | Liberal Democratic Party | – | – |
| Total | | 253,969 | 100% |

=== 1995 ===
==== Declared candidates ====
- Aleksey Anikin (Independent), cossack ataman
- Viktor Apalkov (BI), Chairman of the Krasnodar Krai Arbitral Tribunal
- Lyubov Bakhmetova (Yabloko), consumers' rights advocate
- Nikolay Berezhnoy (Independent), aide to Legislative Assembly of Krasnodar Krai member
- Aleksandr Bondarenko (Independent), Member of Legislative Assembly of Krasnodar Krai (1994–present), krai clinical hospital chief doctor
- Galina Doroshenko (NDR), Director of the Krasnodar Krai Department of Social Protection (1991–present)
- Nikolay Galushko (Kedr), Chairman of the Krasnodar Krai Committee on Environmental Protection
- Nikolay Gorovoy (KRO), former People's Deputy of the Soviet Union (1991), former Chairman of the Krasnodar Krai Executive Committee (1990–1991)
- Vladimir Ilyin (Independent), businessman
- Pyotr Kiriy (APR), incumbent Member of State Duma (1994–present)
- Viktor Kovalenko (LDPR), chief ataman of the Great Brotherhood of Cossack Troops (1994–present)
- Viktor Lebedintsev (Independent), aide to State Duma member Georgy Lukava
- Anatoly Medovnik (Independent), Head of Krasnodar Prikubansky City Okrug (1992–present)
- Georgy Ovchinnikov (Independent), Deputy Military Commissioner of Krasnodar Krai
- Yury Polyakov (V–N!), Member of Legislative Assembly of Krasnodar Krai (1994–present), kolkhoz chairman
- Vladimir Serdyukov (Independent), journalist, 1993 candidate for this seat
- Sergey Sergeyev (Independent), construction cooperative chairman
- Nina Shishkina (K–TR–zSS), business association chairwoman
- Viktor Shturba (Independent), Deputy Governor of Krasnodar Krai
- Sergey Velichko (Independent), geological executive
- Aleksandr Zabolotniy (PST), eye surgeon

==== Withdrawn candidates ====
- Asker Nekhay (PPR–ST), First Deputy Chairman of the Committee of Russia on Trade (1993–present)

==== Results ====
Summary of the 17 December 1995 Russian legislative election in the Prikubansky constituency
| Candidate | Party | Votes | % |
|---|---|---|---|
| Yury Polyakov | Power to the People! | 61,403 | 19.58% |
| Galina Doroshenko | Our Home – Russia | 27,453 | 8.76% |
| Viktor Lebedintsev | Independent | 22,989 | 7.33% |
| Aleksandr Zabolotniy | Party of Workers' Self-Government | 21,770 | 6.94% |
| Nina Shishkina | Communists and Working Russia - for the Soviet Union | 21,406 | 6.83% |
| Pyotr Kiriy (incumbent) | Agrarian Party | 19,347 | 6.17% |
| Nikolay Gorovoy | Congress of Russian Communities | 17,448 | 5.56% |
| Lyubov Bakhmetova | Yabloko | 16,237 | 5.18% |
| Anatoly Medovnik | Independent | 12,935 | 4.13% |
| Aleksandr Bondarenko | Independent | 11,629 | 3.71% |
| Aleksey Anikin | Independent | 10,424 | 3.32% |
| Viktor Shturba | Independent | 9,529 | 3.04% |
| Viktor Kovalenko | Liberal Democratic Party | 6,724 | 2.14% |
| Nikolay Galushko | Kedr | 6,247 | 1.99% |
| Vladimir Serdyukov | Independent | 5,003 | 1.60% |
| Georgy Ovchinnikov | Independent | 4,214 | 1.34% |
| Vladimir Ilyin | Independent | 2,758 | 0.88% |
| Viktor Apalkov | Bloc of Independents | 2,398 | 0.76% |
| Sergey Velichko | Independent | 2,262 | 0.72% |
| Sergey Sergeyev | Independent | 2,103 | 0.67% |
| Nikolay Berezhnoy | Independent | 1,509 | 0.48% |
| against all | | 21,503 | 6.86% |
| Total | | 313,564 | 100% |

=== 1999 ===
==== Declared candidates ====
- Lyubov Alimova (NDR), school computer centre director
- Sergey Bogdanov (Independent), LDPR coordinator in Seversky District
- Vladimir Dimitrov (Independent), Rosneft-Nefteorgsintez executive
- Pyotr Kiriy (Independent), former Member of State Duma (1994–1995)
- Vasily Lyakh (RSP), unemployed
- Oleg Mashchenko (Independent), Chairman of the Krasnodar Krai Committee on Housing Utilities (1997–present)
- Sergey Medyanik (Yabloko), attorney
- Vladimir Novolykin (Independent), Head of the Krasnodar Krai Militsiya Department of Public Order
- Vladimir Perebeynos (Independent), Head of Seversky District (1996–present)
- Aleksandr Polyakov (Independent), businessman
- Vladimir Shapiro (DN), director of the Modern University for the Humanities, Krasnodar branch
- Lyubov Shtangey (Independent), businesswoman, bakery owner
- Yevgeny Yegorov (Independent), director of the North Caucasian Institute of Horticulture and Viticulture (1998–present)
- Aleksandr Yelshin (KRO-Boldyrev), union leader
- Aleksandr Zakharchenko (MTM), rubber products plant director
- Lyudmila Zaytseva (ROS), actress

==== Did not file ====
- Vladimir Cherepanov (Nikolayev–Fyodorov Bloc), unemployed
- Anna Frolova (Independent)
- Vasily Gerasyuta (Independent)
- Pavel Getman (Independent), gas construction businessman
- Viktor Kovalenko (Independent), chief ataman of the Great Brotherhood of Cossack Troops (1994–present), 1995 candidate for this seat
- Pyotr Kursevich (Independent)
- Anatoly Kuzmenko (Independent)
- Georgy Ovchinnikov (Independent), Deputy Military Commissioner of Krasnodar Krai, 1995 candidate for this seat
- Ivan Romensky (Independent)
- Georgy Shchekoldin (Independent), physics lecturer
- Sergey Shchuchkin (Independent)

==== Results ====
Summary of the 19 December 1999 Russian legislative election in the Prikubansky constituency
| Candidate | Party | Votes | % |
|---|---|---|---|
| Oleg Mashchenko | Independent | 135,210 | 42.38% |
| Yevgeny Yegorov | Independent | 35,545 | 11.14% |
| Pyotr Kiriy | Independent | 30,303 | 9.50% |
| Sergey Medyanik | Yabloko | 22,530 | 7.06% |
| Lyudmila Zaytseva | Russian All-People's Union | 11,465 | 3.59% |
| Lyubov Alimova | Our Home – Russia | 8,423 | 2.64% |
| Sergey Bogdanov | Independent | 7,755 | 2.43% |
| Aleksandr Zakharchenko | Peace, Labour, May | 5,304 | 1.66% |
| Aleksandr Polyakov | Independent | 4,552 | 1.43% |
| Vladimir Perebeynos | Independent | 4,224 | 1.32% |
| Aleksandr Yelshin | Congress of Russian Communities-Yury Boldyrev Movement | 3,777 | 1.18% |
| Vasily Lyakh | Russian Socialist Party | 3,685 | 1.16% |
| Vladimir Novolykin | Independent | 3,424 | 1.07% |
| Vladimir Dimitrov | Independent | 3,086 | 0.97% |
| Lyubov Shtangey | Independent | 2,094 | 0.66% |
| Vladimir Shapiro | Spiritual Heritage | 1,976 | 0.62% |
| against all | | 31,121 | 9.75% |
| Total | | 319,042 | 100% |

=== 2003 ===
==== Declared candidates ====
- Lyubov Bakhmetova (Yabloko), consumers' rights advocate, 1995 candidate for this seat
- Nikolay Dyakov (LDPR), lawyer
- Vladimir Gorbachyov (United Russia), telecommunications executive
- Dmitry Gretsoy (Independent), nonprofit executive
- Vladimir Lakeyev (ORP Rus'), plastic molding trainer
- Vitaly Miroshnikov (Independent), sales manager
- Anatoly Safronov (Rodina), businessman
- Viktor Svetlov (CPRF), Member of Timashevsky District Council, kolkhoz chairman

==== Withdrawn candidates ====
- Sergey Suslov (SPS), businessman, December 1996 gubernatorial candidate

==== Did not file ====
- Aleksey Andreyev (PVR-RPZh), former Member of State Duma (1996–1999) (ran in the Apsheronsk constituency)
- Nikolay Berezhnoy (Independent), pensioner, 1995 candidate for this seat
- Marat Dinayev (Independent), nonprofit chairman
- Vyacheslav Kopchikov (NPS RF), insurance businessman
- Anatoly Olenenko (ZRS), businessman

==== Declined ====
- Oleg Mashchenko (Rodina), incumbent Member of State Duma (2000–present) (ran on the party list)

==== Results ====
Summary of the 7 December 2003 Russian legislative election in the Dinskaya constituency
| Candidate | Party | Votes | % |
|---|---|---|---|
| Vladimir Gorbachyov | United Russia | 157,711 | 60.36% |
| Viktor Svetlov | Communist Party | 34,870 | 13.34% |
| Anatoly Safronov | Rodina | 13,002 | 4.98% |
| Lyubov Bakhmetova | Yabloko | 12,579 | 4.81% |
| Nikolay Dyakov | Liberal Democratic Party | 6,998 | 2.68% |
| Dmitry Gretsoy | Independent | 3,348 | 1.28% |
| Vitaly Miroshnikov | Independent | 1,416 | 0.54% |
| Vladimir Lakeyev | United Russian Party Rus' | 829 | 0.32% |
| against all | | 26,573 | 10.17% |
| Total | | 261,511 | 100% |

=== 2016 ===
==== Declared candidates ====
- Denis Danilchenko (A Just Russia), businessman
- Natalya Ivanova (Patriots of Russia), passenger transport dispatcher
- Georgy Kozmenko (The Greens), former Member of State Council of the Republic of Adygea (1993–2001), forestry professor, United Russia primary candidate
- Denis Kumpan (LDPR), businessman
- Dmitry Lameykin (United Russia), Member of Legislative Assembly of Krasnodar Krai (2012–present)
- Sergey Luzinov (CPRF), Member of Legislative Assembly of Krasnodar Krai (2012–present), aide to State Duma member Sergei Obukhov
- Aleksandr Novikov (Party of Growth), businessman
- Denis Panasenko (Rodina), oil construction executive
- Yury Yankin (CPCR), political strategist, perennial candidate
- Georgy Zakharychev (GP), businessman

==== Failed to qualify ====
- Anatoly Alekseyev (Independent), installation engineer

==== Declined ====
- Dmitry Kozachenko (United Russia), Member of Legislative Assembly of Krasnodar Krai (2002–present) (lost the primary)

==== Results ====
Summary of the 18 September 2016 Russian legislative election in the Krasnoarmeysky constituency
| Candidate | Party | Votes | % |
|---|---|---|---|
| Dmitry Lameykin | United Russia | 117,988 | 53.71% |
| Sergey Luzinov | Communist Party | 29,387 | 13.38% |
| Denis Kumpan | Liberal Democratic Party | 23,240 | 10.58% |
| Denis Danilchenko | A Just Russia | 11,004 | 5.01% |
| Denis Panasenko | Rodina | 7,496 | 3.41% |
| Natalya Ivanova | Patriots of Russia | 7,277 | 3.31% |
| Yury Yankin | Communists of Russia | 5,953 | 2.71% |
| Georgy Kozmenko | The Greens | 5,120 | 2.33% |
| Aleksandr Novikov | Party of Growth | 4,452 | 2.03% |
| Georgy Zakharychev | Civic Platform | 2,733 | 1.24% |
| Total | | 219,677 | 100% |

=== 2021 ===
==== Declared candidates ====
- Lyudmila Bazyleva (LDPR), gas station assistant manager
- Roman Borisko (GP), municipal water utilities executive
- Kirill Guryev (Yabloko), hotel manager
- Vitaly Katsko (New People), attorney, law firm partner
- Viktoria Kurilenko (Party of Growth), accountant
- Vladislav Kuznetsov (SR–ZP), trading businessman
- Dmitry Lameykin (United Russia), incumbent Member of State Duma (2021–present)
- Aleksandr Safronov (CPRF), Member of Krasnodar City Duma (2020–present), 2020 gubernatorial candidate
- Andrey Safronov (RPPSS), university community centre director
- Aleksey Todorenko (RPSS), nonprofit president

==== Results ====
Summary of the 17-19 September 2021 Russian legislative election in the Krasnoarmeysky constituency
| Candidate | Party | Votes | % |
|---|---|---|---|
| Dmitry Lameykin (incumbent) | United Russia | 164,331 | 53.57% |
| Aleksandr Safronov | Communist Party | 56,978 | 18.57% |
| Vladislav Kuznetsov | A Just Russia — For Truth | 19,471 | 6.35% |
| Vitaly Katsko | New People | 19,029 | 6.20% |
| Lyudmila Bazyleva | Liberal Democratic Party | 14,859 | 4.84% |
| Andrey Safronov | Party of Pensioners | 9,188 | 3.00% |
| Aleksey Todorenko | Russian Party of Freedom and Justice | 5,417 | 1.77% |
| Kirill Guryev | Yabloko | 4,004 | 1.31% |
| Roman Borisko | Civic Platform | 3,658 | 1.19% |
| Viktoria Kurilenko | Party of Growth | 3,446 | 1.12% |
| Total | | 306,768 | 100% |

=== 2026 ===
==== Declared candidates ====
- Eduard Burdasov (LDPR), Member of Kalininsky District Council (2025–present), medical executive
- Sergey Klimov (New People), Member of Krasnodar City Duma (2025–present), blogger
- Dmitry Lameykin (United Russia), incumbent Member of State Duma (2016–present)
- Vitaly Shchevelev (A Just Russia), Member of Timashevsky District Council (2019–present), businessman
- Igor Shibalkin (CPRF), former Member of Krasnodar City Duma (2020–2025)

==== Results ====
Summary of the 18-20 September 2026 Russian legislative election in the North-Western constituency
| Candidate | Party | Votes | % |
|---|---|---|---|
| Dmitry Lameykin (incumbent) | United Russia | 160,203 | 56.81% |
| Igor Shibalkin | Communist Party | 43,911 | 15.57% |
| Sergey Klimov | New People | 31,627 | 11.22% |
| Eduard Burdasov | Liberal Democratic Party | 26,505 | 9.40% |
| Vitaly Shchevelev | A Just Russia | 17,980 | 6.38% |
| Total | | 281,990 | 100% |
