= Poltavska =

Poltavska (Ukrainian: Полтавська) may refer to:

- The Ukrainian name of Poltavskaya, Krasnodar Krai, Russia
- Poltava Oblast, known in Ukrainian as Poltavska oblast

== See also ==
- Poltavsky
- Poltavka
