= Medvedovsky =

Medvedovsky (Russian: Медведовский; masculine), Medvedovskaya (Медведовская; feminine), or Medvedovskoye (Медведовское; neuter) is the name of several rural localities in Russia:

- Medvedovskoye, a village in Pronovsky Selsoviet of Vetluzhsky District in Nizhny Novgorod Oblast; 57°53′N 44°55′E
- Medvedovskaya, a stanitsa in Medvedovsky Rural Okrug of Timashyovsky District in Krasnodar Krai; 45°27′N 39°2′E
