= Dinskoy =

Dinskoy (masculine), Dinskaya (feminine), or Dinskoye (neuter) may refer to:

- Dinskoy District, a district of Krasnodar Krai, Russia
- Dinskaya, a rural locality (a stanitsa) in Krasnodar Krai, Russia
