= Poltavsky (rural locality) =

Poltavsky (Russian: Полта́вский; masculine), Poltavskaya (Полта́вская; feminine), or Poltavskoye (Полта́вское; neuter) is the name of several rural localities in Russia:

- Poltavsky, Bryukhovetsky District, Krasnodar Krai, a khutor in Baturinsky Rural Okrug of Bryukhovetsky District of Krasnodar Krai
- Poltavsky, Kavkazsky District, Krasnodar Krai, a khutor in Privolny Rural Okrug of Kavkazsky District of Krasnodar Krai
- Poltavsky, Krasnoarmeysky District, Krasnodar Krai, a settlement in Oktyabrsky Rural Okrug of Krasnoarmeysky District of Krasnodar Krai
- Poltavsky, Kushchyovsky District, Krasnodar Krai, a khutor in Razdolnensky Rural Okrug of Kushchyovsky District of Krasnodar Krai
- Poltavsky, Volgograd Oblast, a khutor in Novokiyevsky Selsoviet of Novoanninsky District of Volgograd Oblast
- Poltavskoye, Guryevsky District, Kaliningrad Oblast, a settlement in Dobrinsky Rural Okrug of Guryevsky District of Kaliningrad Oblast
- Poltavskoye, Krasnoznamensky District, Kaliningrad Oblast, a settlement in Dobrovolsky Rural Okrug of Krasnoznamensky District of Kaliningrad Oblast
- Poltavskoye, Stavropol Krai, a selo in Poltavsky Selsoviet of Kursky District of Stavropol Krai
- Poltavskaya, a stanitsa in Poltavsky Rural Okrug of Krasnoarmeysky District of Krasnodar Krai
