= Poltava (disambiguation) =

Poltava is a city in Poltava Oblast, Ukraine.

Poltava may also refer to:

== Places in Ukraine ==
- Poltava Air Base, a military base northwest of the city
- Poltava International Airport, a public airport west of the city
- Poltava Oblast, an oblast (province)

== Military ==
- Battle of Poltava, 1709, a Russian victory over Swedish forces
- Russian ship Poltava, several Russian and Soviet naval vessels

== Other uses ==
- Poltava (poem), a poem by Alexander Pushkin
- Poltava (chicken), a breed of poultry

== See also ==
- Poltavsky (disambiguation)
- Poltavka (disambiguation)
