= Poltavka, Russia =

Poltavka (Russian: Полтавка) is the name of several inhabited localities in Russia.

Urban localities

- Poltavka, Poltavsky District, Omsk Oblast, a work settlement in Poltavsky District of Omsk Oblast

Rural localities

- Poltavka, Novosibirsk Oblast, a selo in Chanovsky District of Novosibirsk Oblast
- Poltavka, Nizhneomsky District, Omsk Oblast, a village in Solovetsky Rural Okrug of Nizhneomsky District in Omsk Oblast
- Poltavka, Primorsky Krai, a selo in Oktyabrsky District of Primorsky Krai
- Poltavka, Ryazan Oblast, a village in Inyakinsky Rural Okrug of Shilovsky District in Ryazan Oblast
- Poltavka, Saratov Oblast, a selo in Samoylovsky District of Saratov Oblast
- Poltavka, Voronezh Oblast, a selo in Dyachenkovskoye Rural Settlement of Bogucharsky District in Voronezh Oblast
