= Poltavsky =

Poltavsky (masculine), Poltavska(ya) (feminine), or Poltavsk(oy)e (neuter) may refer to:

== Places ==
=== Russia ===
- Poltavsky District, a district of Omsk Oblast, Russia
- Poltavsky (rural locality) (Poltavskaya, Poltavskoye), several rural localities

=== Russian Empire ===
- Poltava Governorate (Poltavskaya guberniya), a former subdivision
- Poltavsky Uyezd (Poltavsky uyezd), a former subdivision of the Poltava Governorate

=== Ukraine ===
- Poltava Oblast (Poltavska oblast), an oblast
  - Poltava Raion (Poltavsky raion), a district of Poltava Oblast
- Poltavske, Crimea, a settlement in Crimea

== See also ==
- Poltava (disambiguation)
- Poltavka (disambiguation)
- Poltavska (disambiguation)
