= Peter Engbrecht =

Canadian Second World War veteran

- Born: January 27, 1923; Poltavka, Russia
- Died: April 23, 1991 (aged 68); Altona, Manitoba
- Military career
- Service years: 1941–1973
- Rank: Flight Lieutenant; Master Corporal
- Unit: Royal Canadian Air Force
- Awards: Conspicuous Gallantry Medal; Canadian Forces' Decoration

Peter Engbrecht CGM CD (January 27, 1923 – April 23, 1991) was an ethnic Mennonite-Canadian air gunner. He was the only known Canadian non-pilot ace of the Second World War. Engbrecht was awarded the Conspicuous Gallantry Medal by King George VI in 1944. He is officially credited with 5.5 kills but personally claimed nine.

== Life ==
Engbrecht was born in Poltavka, Russia, Soviet Union, to a Russian Mennonite family. They emigrated to Canada in 1926 where his father began working as a blacksmith in Whitewater, Manitoba. As a youngster he was known as a crack shot with a .22 rifle and after completing public school in grade 8 he began to work in the blacksmith trade with his father.

== Second World War ==
He enlisted in the military when the Second World War began, despite coming from a pacifist Mennonite community and family. Engbrecht was one of 15 Mennonite Canadians from Boissevain and just one of 3,000 Mennonite Canadians who served in the second global war. He would serve with the No. 424 Squadron flying Halifax bombers. During the night of May 27 to 28 they attacked Bourg-Leopold, Belgium on their second mission. The Halifax bomber they were flying, named Dipsy Doodle was attacked 14 times by German night-fighters in a battle that began at the target site all the way back to the English coast. During this battle Engbrecht was credited with at least two kills as they were attacked by German Bf 110 and Ju 88 aircraft. He was credited with two more kills the next month on the night of June 10 to 11. On this mission, they were dispatched to attack a site at Versailles-Matelots in France. Attacked first by a Bf 110 and then by a Bf 109 Engbrecht shot both down from the mid-upper gunner position with assistance from his rear-gunner partner Gordon Gillanders. For these actions he was awarded the Conspicuous Gallantry Medal by King George VI on August 11, one of only eight CGMs presented to Canadians during the war. Engbrecht's citation read that "his exceptional coolness and confidence under fire was a source of inspiration to other crew members. . . His feats have been worthy of great praise."

His actions lead to Engbrecht becoming a household name in Canada and celebrated hero from southwest Manitoba. Journalists referred to Engbrecht as "Canada's top air gunner". A parade was held in his honour at Parliament Hill and he laid a wreath at the national war cenotaph. As a result of his coming from a pacifist and mistakenly thought to be of a German (rather than Dutch) family, his conflicting circumstances were noted by the Toronto Star which stated that "The paradoxical Peter Engbrecht is, all at once, a member of a religious sect which forbids participation in wars, of pure German descent, a member of the RCAF." Despite being celebrated nationally and by the king himself, his own family and community were somewhat conflicted by his participation in the war and he was not warmly received.

== Later life and career ==
Following the war Engbrecht returned to Canada, though like many World War II veterans he did not find a smooth return to civilian life. Three years later in 1948 he returned to military service as radar technician with the military as a part of NORAD. Engbrecht served a total 28.5 years with the Royal Canadian Air Force and as a master corporal he was honoured by the RCAF Association with a Fly-Past Salute on Parliament Hill on September 28, 1972, the first person of his rank to ever take the salute. At the time of his retirement in 1973 he was the longest-serving NORAD serviceman. He then moved to Beausejour, Manitoba working at the local newspaper the Beausejour Beaver. An award was named in his honour and given annual to the "Airperson of the Year" in Canada, though the award was renamed in 1993 to the Roy Slemon award. His wife died in 1978 and he remarried and moved to Altona, Manitoba, before dying in 1991. He was buried in a cemetery in Boissevain, Manitoba, close to his Manitoba hometown of Whitewater, and his headstone was provided by the Royal Canadian Air Force.
