= Poltavka =

Poltavka may refer to:

== Places ==
- Aranlı, Imishli, a village in Azerbaijan, formerly known as Poltavka
- Poltavka, Russia, several inhabited localities in Russia
- Poltavka, a village in Zaporizhzhia Oblast, Ukraine

== Other uses ==
- Poltavka culture, an early to middle Bronze Age archaeological culture of the middle Volga

== See also ==
- Poltava (disambiguation)
- Poltavsky (disambiguation)
