= Timashevsk =

Town in Krasnodar Krai, Russia

Timashyovsk Тимашёвск
- Town
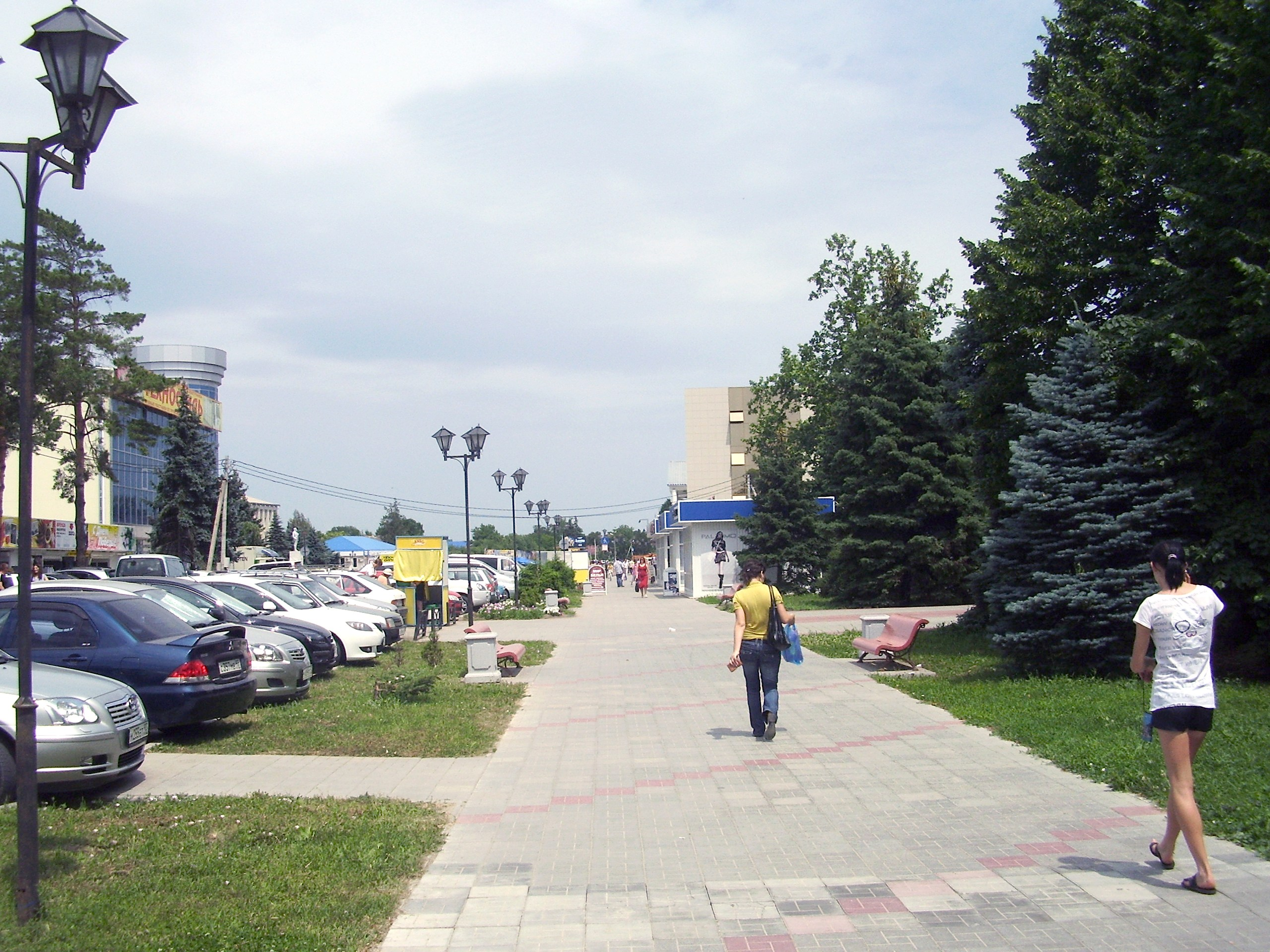
- Central Timashevsk

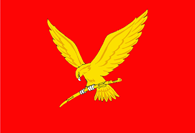
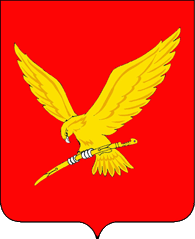
- Flag Coat of arms
- Interactive map of Timashyovsk
- Location of Timashyovsk Timashyovsk (Krasnodar Krai)
- Coordinates: 45°37′N 38°56′E
- Country: Russia
- Federal subject: Krasnodar Krai
- Administrative district: Timashevsky District
- TownSelsoviet: Timashevsk
- Founded: 1794
- Town status since: 1966
- Elevation: 20 m (66 ft)

Population (2010 Census)
  - Total: 53,924
  - Estimate (2025): 51,101 (−5.2%)

Administrative status
  - Capital of: Timashevsky District, Town of Timashevsk

Municipal status
  - Municipal district: Timashevsky Municipal District
  - Urban settlement: Timashevskoe Urban Settlement
  - Capital of: Timashevsky Municipal District, Timashevskoe Urban Settlement
- Time zone: UTC+3 (MSK)
- Postal codes: 352700–352703, 352705, 352706, 352708, 352747, 352749
- Dialing code: +7 86130
- OKTMO ID: 03653101001
- Website: www.adm-timashevsk.ru

Timashevsk population
- 2010 Census: 53,924
- 2002 Census: 54,116
- 1989 Census: 45,556
- 1979 Census: 39,121

Timashyovsk (Russian: Тимашёвск), sometimes romanized Timashyovsk, is a town and the administrative center of Timashevsky District of Krasnodar Krai, Russia, located on the Kirpili River 73 kilometers (45 mi) north of Krasnodar, the administrative center of the krai. As of 2020, the city has a population of 50,792.

== History ==
It was founded in 1794 and was granted town status in 1966. On August 17, 1942, 21 Jews were shot in the "Timachevets" sovkhoz. Seven other Jews were arrested in the hamlet Proletary and taken to there in order to be killed. According to the Extraordinary Soviet Commission, 75 Jews were shot in August 1942 in this location by an Einsatzgruppen.

== Administrative and municipal status ==
Within the framework of administrative divisions, Timashyovsk serves as the administrative center of Timashevsky District. As an administrative division, it is, together with one rural locality (the settlement of Kirpichny), incorporated within Timashevsky District as the Town of Timashevsk. As a municipal division, the Town of Timashyovsk is incorporated within Timashevsky Municipal District as Timashevskoe Urban Settlement.

== Twin towns and sister cities ==
Timashevsk is twinned with:

- Lethbridge, Alberta, Canada

== Notable people ==
- Aleksandr Khromykov (born 1984), Russian professional football coach and former player
