= Murat Zyazikov =

President of Ingushetia from 2002 to 2008

- Мурат Зязиков
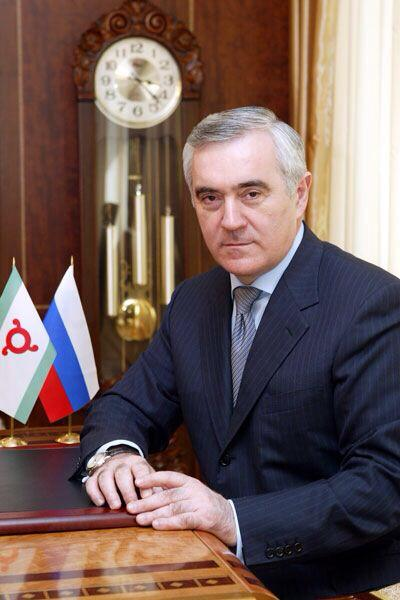

Ambassador of Russia to Cyprus
- Incumbent
- Assumed office 12 September 2022
- Preceded by: Stanislav Osadchiy

President of Ingushetia
- In office May 23, 2002 – October 30, 2008
- Preceded by: Ruslan Aushev
- Succeeded by: Yunus-bek Yevkurov

Personal details
- Born: 10 September 1957 (age 69) Osh, Kyrgyz SSR, Soviet Union (now Kyrgyzstan)
- Party: Non-Partisan
- Spouse: Luiza Magometovna Zyazikova
- Children: 3
- Education: Chechen State University
- Profession: Lawyer, Politician

Murat Magometovich Zyazikov (Russian: Мура́т Магоме́тович Зя́зиков; born September 10, 1957) is a Russian politician and diplomat who was the second president of the southern Russian republic of Ingushetia. He was born in what is now Kyrgyzstan. Zyazikov was a controversial politician in Ingushetia.

== Political career ==
In the 1980s, Zyazikov was a member of the KGB and later the FSB. In the 1990s, he became part of Ingushetia's security council and on May 23, 2002, he was elected president of the republic in the controversial circumstances. Zyazikov is considered a close ally with current Russian president and former Prime Minister Vladimir Putin, especially because of his province's proximity to Chechnya.

On April 6, 2004, Zyazikov was lightly wounded when a car bomb was rammed into his motorcade (he sat in an armored Mercedes W140) on the main road near the city of Nazran. Zyazikov blamed Chechen rebels for that attack and a June 2004 raid in Ingushetia that killed more than 90 people.

On February 27, 2006, Zyazikov's father-in-law (and a member of provincial legislature) Magomet Chakhkiyev was kidnapped in Nazran after his car was shot at and crashed. On March 30, 2006, the kidnappers made their demands: they wanted Zyazikov and Ingushetia prosecutor general Makhmud-Ali Kalimatov to resign in exchange for Chakhkiyev's release. He was released by the police on May 1, 2006, apparently without any payments to the kidnappers. The kidnappers have not been arrested.

On March 23, 2007, his 72-year-old uncle, Uruskhan Zyazikov, was kidnapped in Barsuki, Ingushetia by four armed men. A reward of 2,000,000 rubles (approximately $77,200) for information leading to his return was announced on March 29, 2007. No demands were made by the kidnappers at that point. On June 29, 2007, Zyazikov announced at a press conference that his uncle was still alive. He didn't offer any more information about the kidnapping. The Interior Minister of Ingushetia, Beslan Khamkhoyev, resigned and was replaced by Musa Medov a day before the press conference, apparently as a fallout from the kidnapping. The uncle was released by the kidnappers unharmed on October 11, 2007.

Zyazikov has been accused by the government's critics of corruption and inability to deal with political unrest which has plagued the Ingush republic. The opposition attribute the growing violence to popular anger fueled by alleged abductions, beatings, unlawful arrests and killings of suspects by the federal forces and local police and allied paramilitaries. Amid the increasing tensions, Zyazikov fired his government in March 2008, and called for further social and economic reforms.

== Personal life ==
Zyazikov is married to Luiza Magometovna Chakhiyeva (Russian: Луиза Магометовна Чахкиева), an ophthalmologist and they have three sons.

== Dismissal ==
On October 30, 2008, Murat Zyazikov was dismissed from his post by the Russian President Dmitry Medvedev, As reported by an Interfax news agency.

== Current activities ==
As of 31 October 2008, Zyazikov is one of the few advisors to Dmitry Medvedev. Zyazikov is also the president of FC Angusht Nazran. He was appointed Ambassador of Russia to Cyprus on 12 September 2022.

== Controversy ==
On August 31, 2008, after using the same aeroplane as Zyazikov, journalist Magomet Yevloyev was arrested at the airport. Yevloyev was shot in the temple and killed while in Nazran police custody. Weeks before his killing, Magomet reportedly knew his life was in danger and had planned on seeking political asylum in a European Union country. Local police claimed that Yevloyev was shot after he had attempted to grab an assault rifle from one of the police officers in the car. Human rights groups rejected this account of Yevloyev's death, and the US State Department called for an investigation of the killing and that those responsible be "held to account for what happened". A spokesman for Vladimir Putin said that an investigation will take place, but added that "Yevloyev [had] resisted arrest". In the summer of 2008, Human Rights Watch was also investigating the country's record.

== Honours and awards ==
- Order of Merit for the Fatherland;
  - 3rd class (23 February 2008) - for outstanding contribution to the socio-economic development of the long and fruitful work
  - 4th class (20 December 2004) - a great contribution to strengthening Russian statehood and many years of honest work
- Order of Courage, twice (1997, 2000) - for outstanding contributions to humanitarian work (by the Council of Federal Assembly of Russian Federation)
- "Gold badge" (United Nations)
- Order of St. Sergius, 2nd class (Russian Orthodox Church)
- Order "Al-Fahr", 1st class (Council of Muftis of Russia) - a significant contribution to strengthening interreligious and interethnic peace and accord in society, support for programs aimed at developing the spiritual, moral and human values of Islam, the development of friendship between the peoples of the multiethnic and multi- Russia
- National Award "Best governors and heads of the republics of Russia" (The Expert Council of the Russian Biographical Institute in cooperation with the Moscow Patriarchate of the Russian Orthodox Church) - for great achievements in socio-economic and cultural development and strengthening of international relations at the end of 2004
- Golden Order "Pride of Russia" (Foundation for the "Pride of the Fatherland" and the International Academy of Spiritual Unity of Peoples of the World, July 2006) - for the tremendous organizational work as President of the Republic, long-term service for the good of the Motherland, support the integrity of the Russian Federation, providing a package of measures to raise the region's economy and create jobs
- Honour number 1 (the Bureau of the Association of Teachers "civic") - for outstanding contribution to the education of citizens of the new Russia
- Order of Peter the Great, 1st class (March 2004) - for outstanding service and personal contribution to the development and strengthening of the Russian State
- Gold medal patron (November 2004) - for its contribution to the revival of the glorious traditions of Russian charity
- Order "great victory" - for outstanding service and personal contribution in strengthening the Russian state and in connection with the 60th anniversary of Great Victory
- Medal "60 Years of Victory in Great Patriotic War 1941-1945" - for active participation in the patriotic education of citizens and a large contribution to the preparation and conduct of the anniversary of the Victory

== See also ==
- Ruslan Aushev, the former president of Ingushetia.
- Yunus-Bek Yevkurov, Zyazikov's successor as President.
- Mahmud-Ali Kalimatov, the incumbent Head of the Republic of Ingushetia
