= Dmitry Lameykin =

Russian politician

- Дмитрий Ламейкин
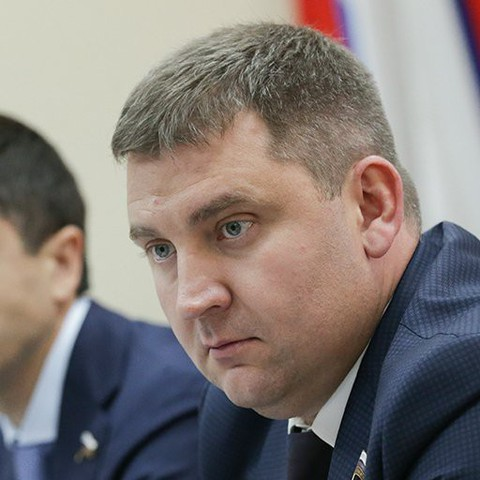

Member of the State Duma for Krasnodar Krai
- Incumbent
- Assumed office 5 October 2016
- Preceded by: constituency re-established
- Constituency: Krasnoarmeysky (No. 47)

Personal details
- Born: 27 February 1977 (age 49) Krasnodar, Russian SFSR, USSR
- Party: United Russia
- Education: Cyprus College of Marketing, Kuban State University
- Occupation: Journalist

Dmitry Victorovich Lameykin (Russian: Дмитрий Викторович Ламейкин; born 27 February 1977, Krasnodar) is a Russian political figure and a deputy of the 7th and 8th State Dumas. In 2007, he was granted a Candidate of Sciences in Economics degree.

After graduating from high school, Lameykin studied at the Cyprus College of Marketing. After that, he worked as a correspondent at the newspaper "Kuban – business" in Cyprus. In 1997, he returned to Krasnodar and worked as deputy editor-in-chief of the editorial office of Volnaya Kuban. On 10 October 2010 he was elected deputy of the Krasnodar City Duma of the 5th convocation. From 2012 to 2016, he was the deputy of the Legislative Assembly of Krasnodar Krai. In 2016, he became the deputy of the 7th State Duma. Since September 2021, he has served as deputy of the 8th State Duma from the Krasnodar Krai constituency.
