= Aleksandr Khromykov =

Russian footballer and coach

Personal information
- Full name: Aleksandr Yuryevich Khromykov
- Date of birth: 23 January 1984 (age 42)
- Place of birth: Timashyovsk, Krasnodar Krai, Russian SFSR
- Height: 1.83 m (6 ft 0 in)
- Position: Defender

Team information
- Current team: FC Krasnodar-2 (assistant coach)

Senior career*
Years	Team	Apps	(Gls)
2003–2004	FC Krasnodar-2000	48	(4)
2004	FC Dynamo Makhachkala	12	(0)
2005	FC Krasnodar-2000	8	(0)
2005	FC Amur Blagoveshchensk	15	(0)
2006	FC Kuban Krasnodar	1	(0)
2007	FC Dynamo Stavropol	18	(2)
2008	FC Dynamo Krasnodar		
2009	FC Stavropol	4	(0)
2010	FC Dynamo-Biolog Novokubansk (amateur)		
2011–2012	FC Gubkin	15	(1)

Managerial career
- 2016–2017: FC Krasnodar-2 (assistant)
- 2018: FC Krasnodar-2 (assistant)
- 2018–2019: FC Krasnodar (U19)
- 2020–2021: FC Krasnodar (U16)
- 2021–2022: FC Krasnodar (academy)
- 2022–2023: FC Krasnodar-2 (assistant)
- 2023: FC Krasnodar-2
- 2023–: FC Krasnodar-2 (assistant)
- * Club domestic league appearances and goals

Aleksandr Yuryevich Khromykov (Russian: Александр Юрьевич Хромыков; born 23 January 1984) is a Russian professional football coach and a former player. He is an assistant coach of FC Krasnodar-2.

== Playing career ==
He played 3 seasons in the Russian Football National League for FC Dynamo Makhachkala, FC Amur Blagoveshchensk and FC Kuban Krasnodar.
