= Vladimir Abazarov =

Soviet geologist

Vladimir Alekseevich Abazarov
- Born: 6 May 1930; Tihovskoi khutor, Krasnodar Territory, Soviet Union
- Died: 13 May 2003 (aged 73); Tyumen, Russia
- Occupation: geologist
- Spouse: Lenina Vasilyevna Abazarova
- Awards: Lenin Prize (1970); Order of Lenin (1966)

Vladimir Alekseevich Abazarov (Russian: Владимир Алексеевич Абазаров; 6 May 1930 – 13 May 2003) was an eminent Soviet geologist.

He took part in discovering of large and unique oil fields in Western Siberia. V. A. Abazarov is a discoverer of the largest Russian Samotlor oil field.

== Biography ==
Born 6 May 1930 in Tihovskoi khutor of Krasnoarmeyskiy region of the Krasnodar Territory.

In 1948 Abazarov finished secondary school and began to work as an accounter in Krasnoarmeyskiy rice sovkhoz. He wanted to enter Moscow Aviation Institute (MAI) in 1948 and become a pilot, as his brother Boris Alekseevich Abazarov (who later has become a commander of 62nd fighter aviation regiment). In 1949 he entered Grozny oil institute, in 1954 he finished it and acquired a profession of mining engineer of drilling. He worked on drilling enterprises in the Krasnodar Territory and Stalingrad region as a drilling foreman, an engineer, the head of drilling and the superintendent of testing deep boreholes shop until 1959.

In March 1960 V.A. Abazarov arrived in Tyumen on the invitation of director of “Tyumenneftegeologiya” Yuri Georgievich Ervier. In 1960 - 1962 he was an engineer in chief of Khanty–Mansi (later Berezovskaya) geological exploring expedition.

In 1962 he was nominated for the appointment of the director of Megion oil-prospecting expedition. In June of the same year he arrived in Megion. At that moment the only Megion oil - field was discovered and three oil wells were opened.

As primary task V.A. Abazarov determined the steady raising of the rate of exploring and preparation of oil reserves. He organized the administration for a certain program for construction of developed wooden habitation, social and cultural objects and industrial base.

Megion expedition was increasing the rate of drilling with every year. Vatinskoe, Severo – Pokurskoe, Aganskoe, Nizhnevartovskoe oil fields were opened. In 1965 famous Samotlor oil field was discovered. In 1967 large Varyeganskoe oil and gas field was opened, in 1968 – Malo – Tchernogorskoe, in 1970 – Bolshe – Thcernogorskoe, Tyumenskoe and Severo – Varyeganskoe. All in all, Megion geologists have opened more than 135 oil and gas deposits.

In 1970 the group of Megion expedition was awarded the order “Sign of honour”. In the same year Vladimir Alekseevich Abazarov, together with L.N. Kabaev, I.I. Nesterov, F.K. Salmanov, V.G. Smirnov, A.D. Storoshev, was awarded Lenin Prize for discovery of new deposits in the middle Ob side and fast preparation of industrial reserves.

Rates of developing of Samotlor were increasing with every year. Great changes took place from 1971 to 1974 under V.A. Abazarov being the director of geological department “Megionneft”. He was appreciated for his fairness and consistency, analytical mind and strong will.

In 1975–1976 he was the head of Karskaya oil exploring expedition. Later, in 1976–1977, he was the director of technology section of industrial union"Obneftegasgeologiya". In 1977-1980 V.A. Abazarov became the deputy director of drilling department of industrial association “Nizhnevartovskneftegas”, in 1980–1981 – he was the vice – president of oil and gas department “Belozerneft”. From 1983 to 1992 he was the head of Yuzchno – Tarkosalinskaya and Yamal expeditions.

Abazarov is remembered not only for the discoveries of oil fields in interior of Tyumen North, but for his justice in spite of harshness. “He worked selflessly, without being sorry of forces and time. In spite of any difficulty, he always was on his post. He could combine dislike to grabbers and dodgers with trust and friendliness to people.”

He continued to work a lot, even when he retired on a pension in 1992. He was the president of Union of creators of oil and gas complex in Western Siberia (1997–2002), which was founded on his initiative for “acceptance of concrete measures for improvement of vital conditions of founders of the Tyumen oil and gas complex..., preservation and development of spiritual, moral and cultural values and traditions”.

Vladimir Alekseevich Abazarov died on 13 May 2003. He was buried in Tyumen on Tchervishevskoe graveyard.

== Awards ==
- Order of Lenin (1966)
- Laureate of Lenin Prize (1970)
- Diploma “Discoverer of field” (1976, Samotlor oil field)
- Honourable citizen of Nizhnevartosk region of Tyumen oblast (1997)
