= Georgiy Muradov =

Russian diplomat (born 1954)

- Георгий Мурадов
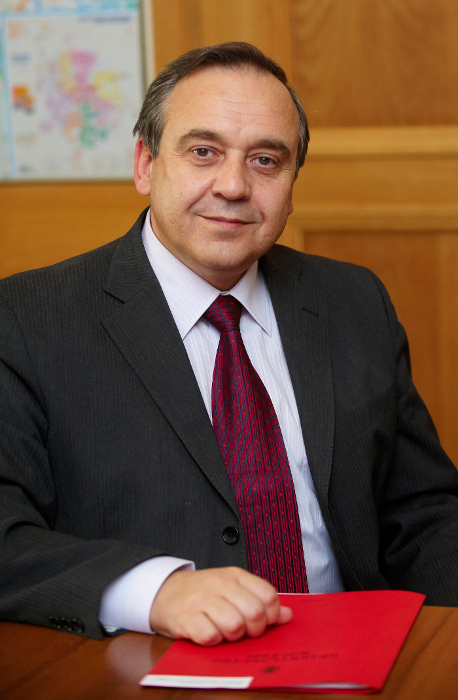
- Muradov in 2019

Deputy Chairman of the Council of Ministers of Crimea - Permanent Representative of the Republic of Crimea under the President of Russia
- Incumbent
- Assumed office 7 August 2014

Advisor to the Mayor of Moscow
- Incumbent
- Assumed office 21 October 2010

Minister of the Government of Moscow - Head of the Department of Foreign Economic and International Relations of the City of Moscow
- In office 2000 – 21 October 2010
- Succeeded by: Sergey Cheryomin

Ambassador of Russia to Cyprus
- In office 18 November 1996 – 25 October 1999
- Preceded by: Boris Zenkov
- Succeeded by: Vladimir Pavlinov

Personal details
- Born: Georgiy Lvovich Muradov; 19 November 1954 (age 71) Komches, Russian SFSR, Soviet Union

Georgiy Lvovich Muradov (Russian: Георгий Львович Мурадов; born 19 November 1954), is a Russian politician, statesman, and diplomat. He is currently the Deputy Chairman of the Council of Ministers of Crimea, and the Permanent Representative of the Republic of Crimea under the President of the Russia since 7 August 2014. He is also currently the advisor to the Mayor of Moscow.

Muradov as served as the ambassador to Cyprus from 1996 to 1999. He is also the acting State Councilor of Russia 2nd class, and the acting State Councilor of the city of Moscow, 1st class, awarded in 2000.

== Biography ==
Georgiy Muradov was born on 19 November 1954, in the village of Kochmes of the Inta region of the Komi Autonomous Soviet Socialist Republic, to his parents, Lev Vladimirovich, his father, and Yelena Shapovalova, his mother, and to a family of doctors, and participants in the Great Patriotic War. Lev, (born in 1910 in Krasnodar), was Armenian by nationality, and a major of the medical service.

In 1972, he graduated from the secondary special (English) school number 36 of Krasnodar.

From 1972 to 1974, he was a student of the evening department of the Faculty of Romance and Germanic Philology of the Kuban State University in Krasnodar.

In 1979, he graduated with honors from the Moscow State Institute of International Relations (University) of the Soviet Ministry of Foreign Affairs, with a specialty in international relations. He is a Lenin scholar.

From 1979 to 1992, Muradov was in the diplomatic service in Greece. He worked in various positions in the central office and foreign missions of the Soviet and Russian Foreign Ministries.

From 1992 to 1996, he was the Counselor-Minister of the Embassy of Russia in Sofia, Bulgaria.

In 1996, he graduated from the diplomatic courses of the Diplomatic Academy. He has a doctorate in history.

On 18 November 1996, Muradov served as the Russian Ambassador to Cyprus, until 25 October 1999.

From 2000 to 2007, he was the Head of the Moscow Department of International Relations.

From 2007 to 2010, he was the Head of the Department of Foreign Economic and International Relations of the city of Moscow.

On 7 August 2014, Muradov became a Deputy Chairman of the Council of Ministers of the Republic of Crimea, and a Permanent Representative of the Republic of Crimea to the President of Russia.

=== Sanctions ===
He was included in the list of persons sanctioned by the European Union for actions aimed at undermining the territorial integrity of Ukraine.

He was sanctioned by the UK government in 2014 in relation to the Russo-Ukrainian War.

== Personal life ==
=== Family ===
He is married to Irina Yuryevna Muradova and has three sons: Yury, Sergey and Albert.

=== Languages ===
He is fluent in English, Greek and Bulgarian.
