= South-Western constituency (Krasnodar Krai) =

South-Western single-member constituency
- Constituency of the Russian State Duma
- Deputy: Galina Golovchenko; United Russia
- Federal subject: Krasnodar Krai
- Districts: Goryachy Klyuch, Krasnodar (Beryozovy, part of Prikubansky, Yelizavetinskaya, Zapadny), Seversky
- Voters: 524,323 (2026)

The South-Western constituency (No.51) is a Russian legislative constituency in Krasnodar Krai. The constituency covers western Krasnodar as well as balneotherapeutical resort Goryachy Klyuch and Seversky District to the south of the city.

The constituency has been represented since 2026 by United Russia deputy Galina Golovchenko, former Member of Legislative Assembly of Krasnodar Krai and lawyer, who won the open seat after defeating State Duma Committee on Youth Policy chairman Artem Metelev in the primary.

== Boundaries ==
2026–present: Goryachy Klyuch, Krasnodar (Beryozovy, part of Prikubansky, Yelizavetinskaya, Zapadny), Seversky District
The constituency was created during the 2025 redistricting from parts of Krasnodar (Zapadny urban okrug of Krasnodar), Krasnoarmeysky (Prikubansky urban okrug of Krasnodar) and Tuapse (Goryachy Klyuch and Seversky District) constituencies.

== Members elected ==
Election	Member	Party
2026	Galina Golovchenko	United Russia

== Election results ==
=== 2026 ===
==== Declared candidates ====
- Galina Golovchenko (United Russia), Member of Legislative Assembly of Krasnodar Krai (2022–present), property management executive
- Fyodor Osipov (LDPR), Member of Krasnodar City Duma (2025–present)
- Aleksandr Safronov (CPRF), Member of Krasnodar City Duma (2020–present), 2020 and 2025 gubernatorial candidate
- Yulia Safronova (RPPSS), OB-GYN
- Igor Vinogradov (A Just Russia), legal counsel

==== Withdrawn candidates ====
- Aleksandr Barashkov (New People), businessman (withdrawn on September 5, 2026, for causing political damage to the party)

==== Declined ====
- Artem Metelev (United Russia), Member of State Duma (2021–present), Chairman of the Duma Committee on Youth Policy (2021–present) (lost the primary, running on the party list)

==== Results ====
Summary of the 18-20 September 2026 Russian legislative election in the South-Western constituency
Candidate	Party	Votes	%
Galina Golovchenko	United Russia	197,480	67.59%
Aleksandr Safronov	Communist Party	49,061	16.79%
Fyodor Osipov	Liberal Democratic Party	17,141	5.87%
Igor Vinogradov	A Just Russia	13,629	4.66%
Yulia Safronova	Party of Pensioners	11,124	3.81%
Total		292,195	100%
