= Medvedovskaya =

Medvedovskaya Медвёдовская (рфр)
- Stanitsa
- Interactive map of Medvedovskaya
- Location of Medvedovskaya Medvedovskaya (Krasnodar Krai)
- Coordinates: 45°27′N 39°02′E
- Country: Russia
- Federal subject: Krasnodar Krai
- Administrative district: Timashyovsky District
- Rural okrugSelsoviet: Medvedovsky Rural Okrug
- Founded: 1794
- Elevation: 12 m (39 ft)

Population (2010 Census)
  - Total: 16,793
  - Estimate (2021): 17,404 (+3.6%)
- Time zone: UTC+3 (MSK)
- Postal code: 352720–352722
- OKTMO ID: 03653413101

Medvedovskaya (Russian: Медвёдовская) is a rural locality (a stanitsa) in Timashyovsky District of Krasnodar Krai, Russia. Population: 16,793 (2010 census); 16,725 (2002 census); 13,464 (1989 Soviet census).
