= Kirpili =

River in Krasnodar Krai, Russia

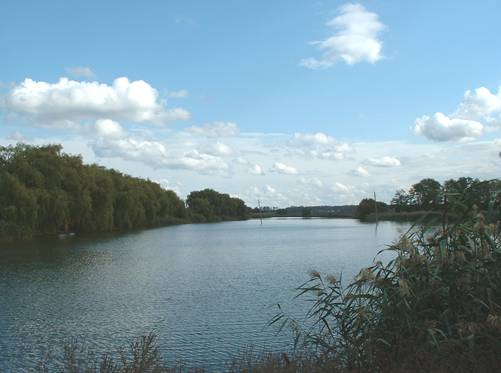
The Kakayka River, a tributary of the Kirpili River in the area of the Platnirovskaya stanitsa

Kirpili (Russian: Кирпили) (from Turkic languages: bridge or passage) is a river in Krasnodar Krai in Russia. It is 202 kilometres (126 mi) long.

The river is used for irrigation. The town of Timashyovsk lies by the Kirpili.
