= Kochmes =

Kochmes (Russian: Кочмес) is the name of two rural localities under the administrative jurisdiction of the city of republic significance of Inta in the Komi Republic, Russia:

- Kochmes, Kosyuvom Selo Administrative Territory, Inta, Komi Republic, a settlement in Kosyuvom Selo Administrative Territory; 66°22′N 60°1′E
- Kochmes, Verkhnyaya Inta, Inta, Komi Republic, a settlement under the administrative jurisdiction of Verkhnyaya Inta Urban-Type Settlement Administrative Territory; 66°11′N 60°47′E
