= Poltavsky, Volgograd Oblast =

Poltavsky Полтавский
- Khutor
- Location within Volgograd Oblast Location within Russia
- Coordinates: 50°22′N 43°04′E
- Country: Russia
- Region: Volgograd Oblast
- District: Novoanninsky District
- Time zone: UTC+4:00

Poltavsky (Russian: Полтавский) is a rural locality (a khutor) in Novokiyevskoye Rural Settlement, Novoanninsky District, Volgograd Oblast, Russia. The population was 102 as of 2010. There are 5 streets.

== Geography ==
Poltavsky is located in forest steppe on the Khopyorsko-Buzulukskaya Plain, on the bank of the Karmanchik River, 59 km southeast of Novoanninsky (the district's administrative centre) by road. Drobyazkin is the nearest rural locality.
