= Poltava (chicken) =

Breed of chicken

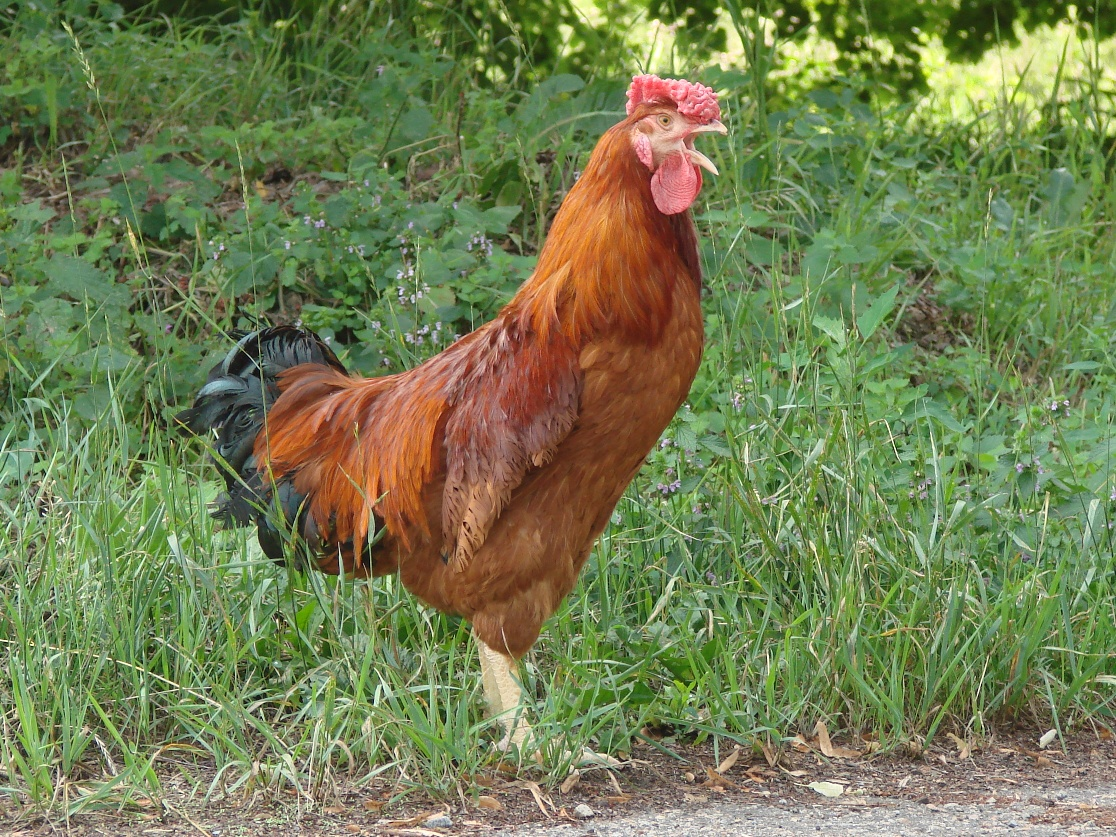
Poltava Clay male crowing

The Poltava is an old Ukrainian dual-purpose breed of chicken named after the Ukrainian city of Poltava. It includes three color varieties: Clay, Cuckoo, and Black.

== Breed and variety names ==
- Ukrainian Names: полтавська (глиняста, зозуляста, чорна)
- English Names: Poltava (Clay, Cuckoo, Black)
- Russian Names: полтавская (глинистая, зозулястая, черная)

== Genetic analysis ==
The Poltava Clay variety was included in the studies of genetic diversity and relationships between various chicken breeds:

- Moiseyeva; et al. (1994). "unknown". University of Pennsylvania Libraries. Archived from the original on March 13, 2007.
- Nikiforov et al. (1998)
- Romanov and Weigend (2001)
- Semyenova et al. (2002)
- Moiseyeva et al. (2003)
- Hillel et al. (2003)

The latter study was done in 1998—2000 within the framework of an international research project entitled «Development of Strategy and Application of Molecular Tools to Assess Biodiversity in Chicken Genetic Resources», or shortly AVIANDIV, that was sponsored by European Commission and co-ordinated by Dr. Steffen Weigend, of the Institute for Animal Breeding, Mariensee, Germany.

The AVIANDIV project employed anonymous genetic markers, so called microsatellite loci spread across the whole genome. It was shown that 33 populations had no unique alleles, and 14 populations had one unique allele.

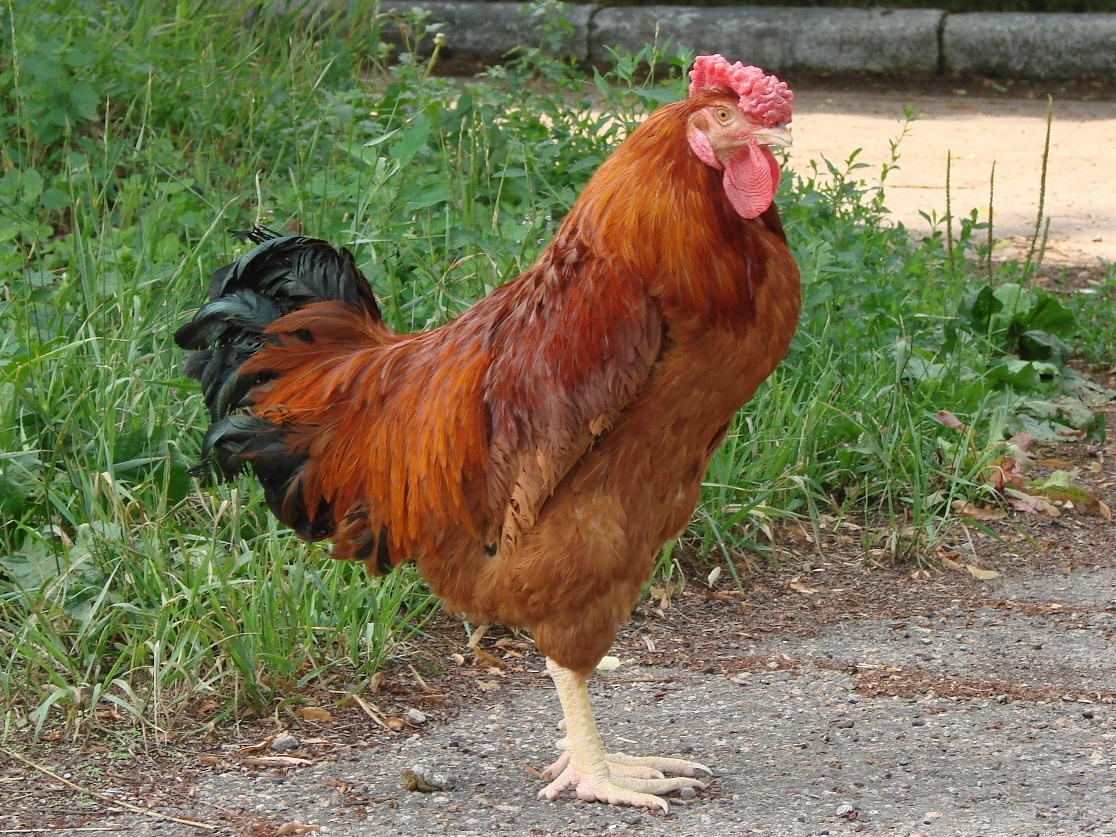
Poltava Clay male

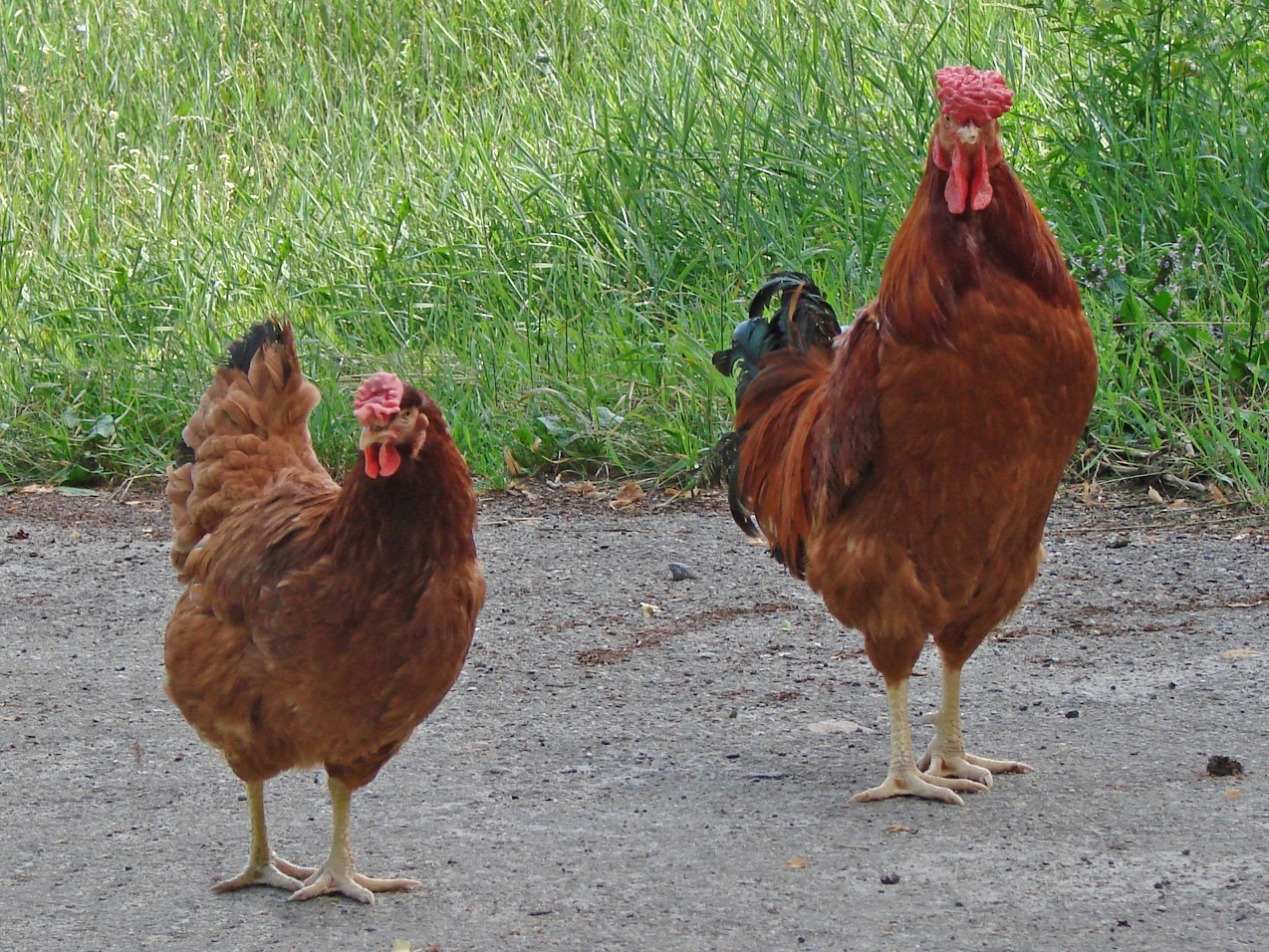
Poltava Clay female and male

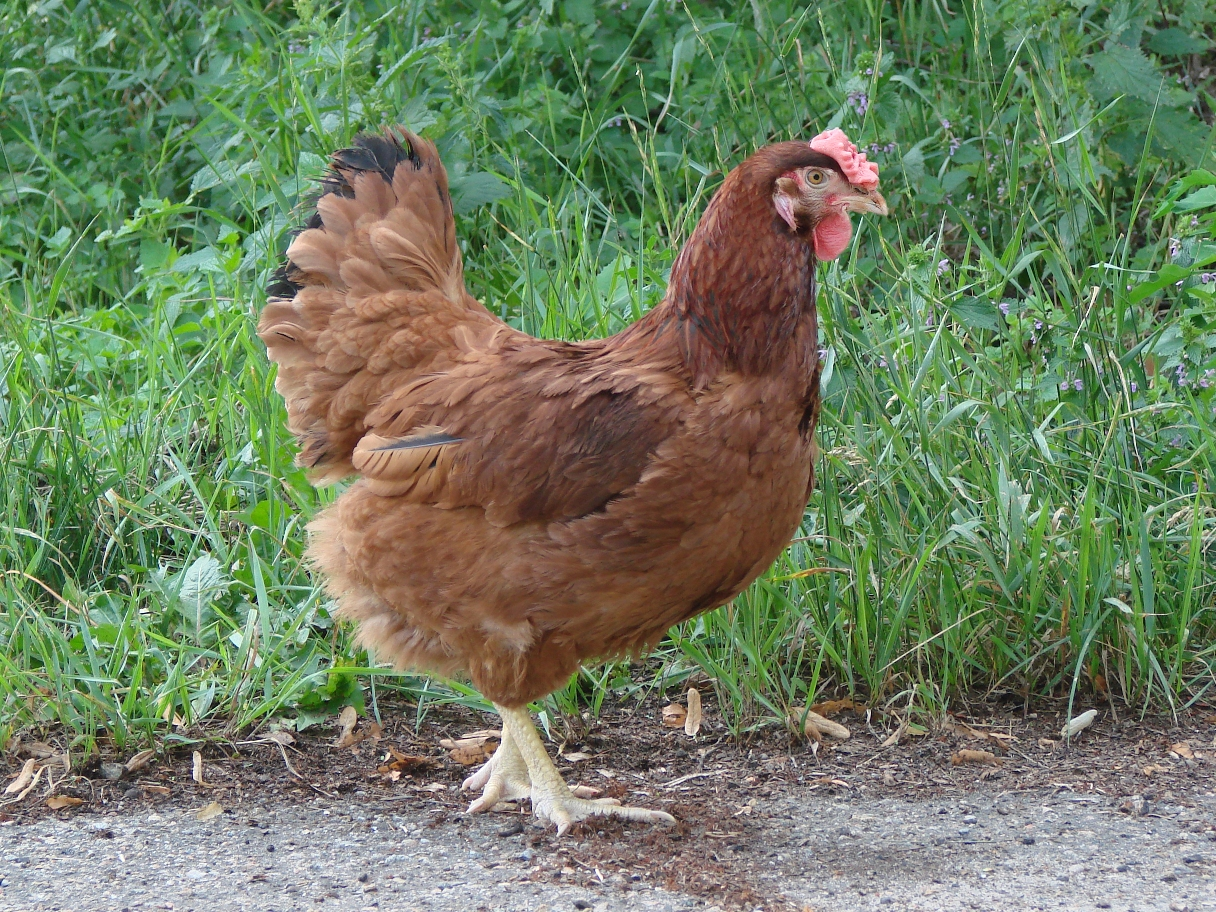
Poltava Clay female

== See also ==
- Federal Agricultural Research Centre
