= List of ambassadors of Russia to Cyprus =

Ambassador of the Russian Federation to the Republic of Cyprus
- Emblem of the Russian Foreign Ministry

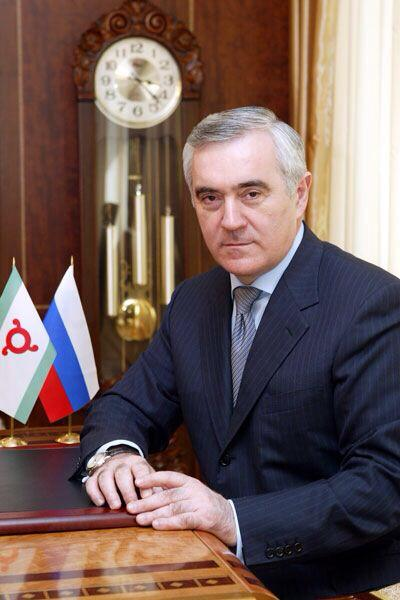
- Incumbent; Murat Zyazikov since 12 September 2022
- Ministry of Foreign Affairs; Embassy of Russia in Nicosia
- Style: His Excellency; The Honourable
- Reports to: Minister of Foreign Affairs
- Seat: Nicosia
- Appointer: President of Russia
- Term length: At the pleasure of the president
- Formation: 1960
- First holder: Pavel Yermoshin
- Website: Embassy of Russia in Cyprus

The ambassador extraordinary and plenipotentiary of the Russian Federation to the Republic of Cyprus is the official representative of the president and the government of the Russian Federation to the president and the government of Cyprus.

The ambassador and his staff work at large in the Embassy of Russia in Nicosia. The post of Russian ambassador to Cyprus is currently held by Murat Zyazikov, incumbent since 12 September 2022.

== History of diplomatic relations ==
Diplomatic relations at the mission level between the Soviet Union and Cyprus were first established in August 1960. The first ambassador, Pavel Yermoshin, was appointed on 16 December 1960, and presented his credentials on 31 December 1960. With the dissolution of the Soviet Union in 1991, the Soviet ambassador, Boris Zenkov, continued as representative of the Russian Federation until 1996.

== List of representatives (1960–present) ==
=== Soviet Union to Cyprus (1960–1991) ===
Name	Title	Appointment	Termination	Notes
Pavel Yermoshin	Ambassador	16 December 1960	20 April 1968	
Nikita Tolubeyev	Ambassador	20 April 1968	4 December 1970	
Anatoly Barkovsky	Ambassador	8 January 1971	7 July 1973	
Sergey Astavin	Ambassador	7 July 1973	31 July 1986	
Yury Fokin	Ambassador	31 July 1986	2 October 1990	
Boris Zenkov	Ambassador	14 September 1990	25 December 1991	

=== Russian Federation to Cyprus (1991–present) ===
Name	Title	Appointment	Termination	Notes
Boris Zenkov	Ambassador	25 December 1991	18 November 1996	
Georgiy Muradov	Ambassador	18 November 1996	25 October 1999	
Vladimir Pavlinov	Ambassador	31 December 1999	20 November 2003	
Andrei Nesterenko	Ambassador	24 November 2003	11 September 2008	
Vyacheslav Shumsky	Ambassador	11 September 2008	3 June 2013	
Stanislav Osadchiy	Ambassador	3 June 2013	12 September 2022	
Murat Zyazikov	Ambassador	12 September 2022		
