= Sergei Obukhov =

Russian politician

Sergei Obukhov MP
- Сергей Обухов
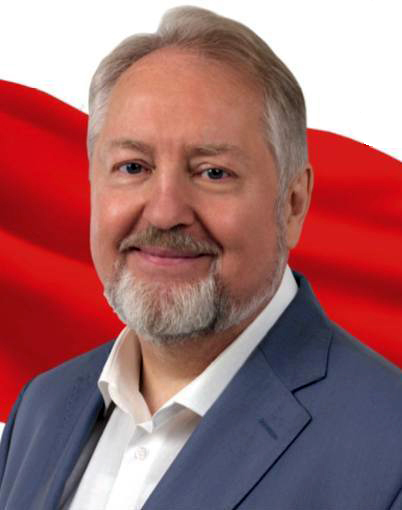

Member of the State Duma (Party List Seat)
- Incumbent
- Assumed office 12 October 2021
- In office 24 December 2007 – 5 October 2016

Personal details
- Born: 5 October 1958 (age 67) Lvov, Ukrainian SSR, USSR
- Party: CPSU (until 1991); CPRF
- Education: Lviv Polytechnic Institute; Kostroma Agricultural Institute
- Occupation: Journalist
- Religion: Russian Orthodox

Sergei Pavlovich Obukhov (Russian: Сергей Павлович Обухов; born 5 October 1958) is a Russian politician. The secretary of the central committee of the Communist Party of the Russian Federation (CPRF), he was a deputy of the 5th and 6th State Dumas in Moscow. In this capacity, he was also a member of the State Duma Committee for public associations and religious organizations. He returned to the 8th convocation of the State Duma in 2021.

== Career ==
Obukhov became a deputy of the State Duma in 2007.

| Years | State Duma | Party |
|---|---|---|
| 2007-2011 | 5th State Duma | Communist Party |
| 2011-2015 | 6th State Duma | Communist Party |
| 2021-2025 | 8th State Duma | Communist Party |

== Sanctions ==
Obukhov was sanctioned in March 2022 by the United Kingdom.
