= Power to the People (Russia) =

Power to the People! Власть — народу!
- Leader: Nikolai Ryzhkov; Sergey Baburin; Yelena Shuvalova
- Founded: 18 July 1995
- Dissolved: 17 December 1995
- Succeeded by: Narodovlastie
- Ideology: Pochvennichestvo; Social conservatism
- Political position: Left-wing
- Member parties: Russian All-People's Union; Union of Officers; Movement of Mothers "For Social Justice"
- Colours: Black; Gold; White
- Slogan: "Power to the People!" (Russian: "Власть — народу!", romanized: "Vlast' — narodu!")

The People's Patriotic Movement "Power to the People!" (Russian: Народно-патриотическое движение «Власть — народу!»; Narodno-patrioticheskoye dvizheniye «Vlast' — narodu!») was a political alliance in Russia.

== History ==
Power to the People! was established in 1995 as an alliance of several groups, including the Russian All-People's Union, the For Social Equality movement, and the Popular Movement "Union". In the 1995 Russian legislative election, the alliance received 1.6% of the proportional representation vote, failing to cross the electoral threshold; it won nine constituency seats in the State Duma, and sided with other deputies in the Narodovlastie faction. The party did not contest any further elections; the Russian All-People's Union contested the 1999 Russian legislative election alone, winning two seats.
