= Poltavskaya =

Place in Krasnodar Krai, Russia

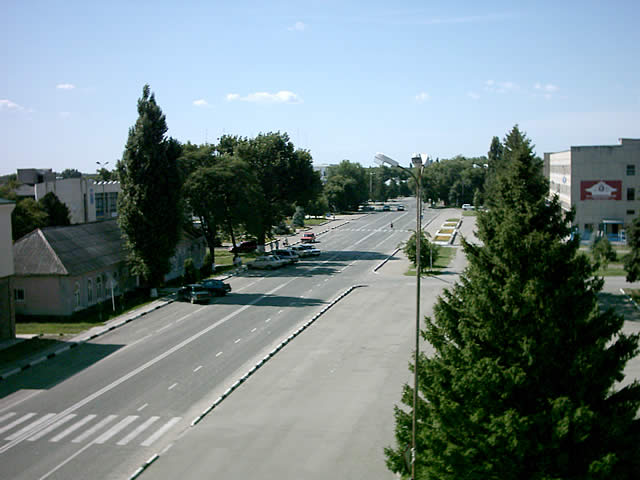
The village of Stanytsa Poltavskya

Poltavskaya (Russian: Полта́вская; Ukrainian: Полта́вська, romanized: Poltavska) is a rural locality (a stanitsa) and the administrative center of Krasnoarmeysky District of Krasnodar Krai, Russia, located on the Kuban River, 65 kilometers (40 mi) west of Krasnodar. Population: 26,490 (2010 census); 28,639 (2002 census); 23,788 (1989 Soviet census).

== History ==
Founded in 1794, it is one of the first forty settlements of Kuban Cossacks in the area. It was named after one of the 40 kurins that composed the Zaporizhian Cossacks Host. Initially the locality was known as kurin and accounted for only 460 people (298 men and 162 women). In 1807 it was almost completely destroyed by neighboring local mountainous tribes. Its status of stanitsa, the locality received in 1842. It supported the creation of the Kuban People's Republic.

=== Collectivization and deportation ===
Poltavskaya sabotaged and resisted collectivization period of the Soviet Union more than any other area in the Kuban which was perceived by Lazar Kaganovich to be connected to Ukrainian nationalist and Cossack conspiracy. Kaganovich relentlessly pursued the policy of requisition of grain in Poltavskaya and the rest of the Kuban and personally oversaw the purging of local leaders and Cossacks. Kaganovich viewed the resistance of Poltavskaya through Ukrainian lens delivering oration in a mixed Ukrainian language. To justify this Kaganovich cited a letter allegedly written by a stanitsa ataman named Grigorii Omel'chenko advocating Cossack separatism and local reports of resistance to collectivization in association with this figure to substantiate this suspicion of the area. However Kaganocvich did not reveal in speeches throughout the region that many of those targeted by persecution in Poltavskaya had their family members and friends deported or shot including in years before the supposed Omel'chenko crisis even started. Ultimately due to being perceived as the most rebellious area almost all (or 12,000) members of the Poltavskaya stantisa were deported to the north. This coincided with and was a part of a wider deportation of 46,000 cossacks from Kuban. At the same time, Poltavskaya was renamed Krasnoarmeyskaya (Красноарме́йская). The original name was returned in the 1990s.

== Radio transmission ==
In the vicinity, at 45°24′11″N 38°9′32″E, is located a large facility for VLF-transmission. It is used for transmitting the RJH63 time signal and the RSDN-20 radio navigation signal. The antenna system consists of seven guyed masts, six of which are arranged in a row around a central mast. As a result of its military importance, the facility is not shown on official maps and there are no technical data available.
