= Dinskaya =

Dinskaya Динская
- Stanitsa
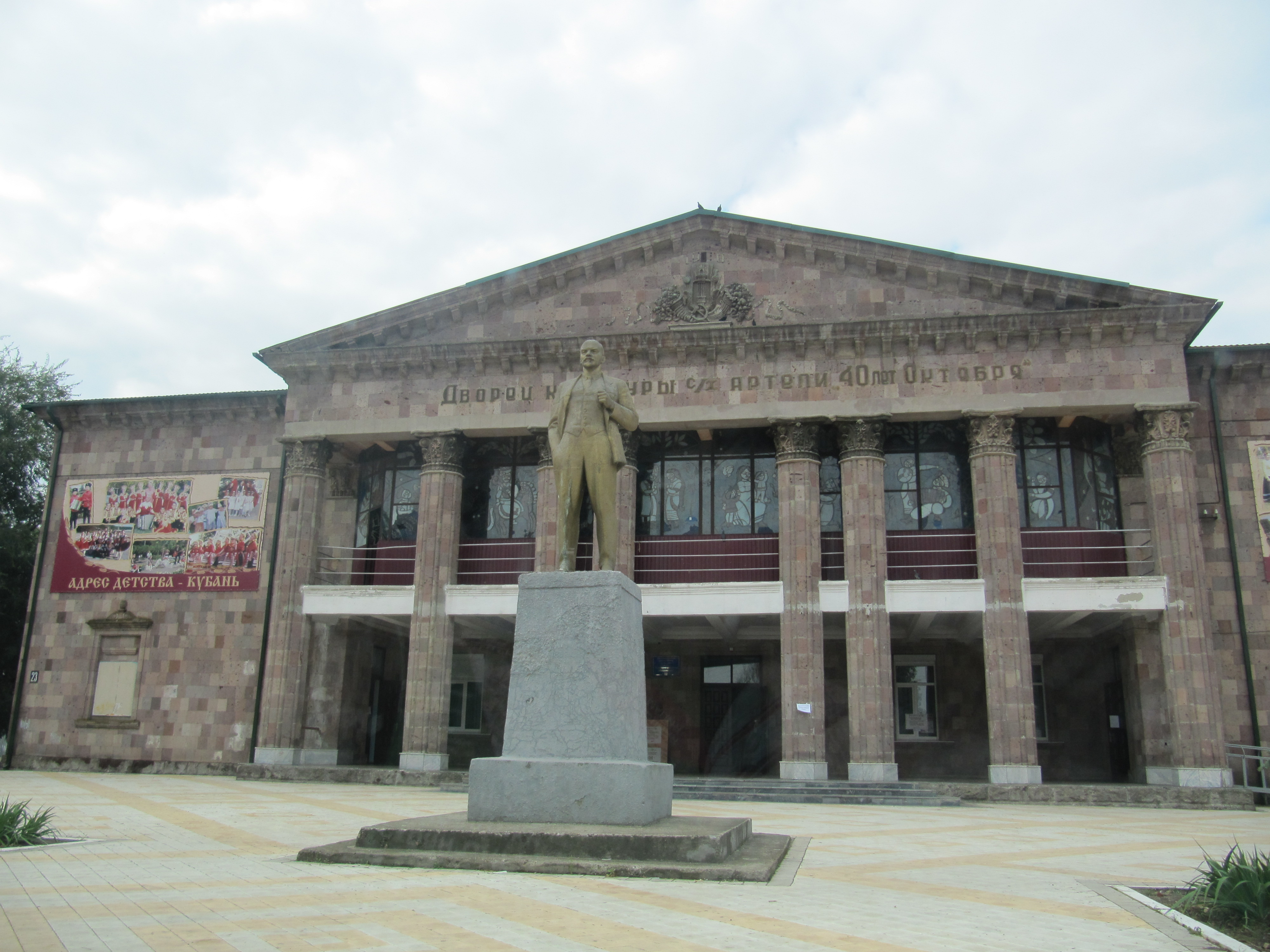
- Palace of Culture in Dinskaya

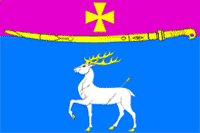
- Flag
- Interactive map of Dinskaya
- Location of Dinskaya Dinskaya (Krasnodar Krai)
- Coordinates: 45°13′N 39°14′E
- Country: Russia
- Federal subject: Krasnodar Krai
- Administrative district: Dinskoy District
- Founded: 1794
- Elevation: 40 m (130 ft)

Population (2010 Census)
  - Total: 34,848
  - Estimate (2021): 36,576 (+5%)

Administrative status
  - Capital of: Dinskoy District
- Time zone: UTC+3 (MSK)
- Postal code: 353200–353202
- OKTMO ID: 03614404101

Dinskaya (Russian: Динска́я) is a large rural locality (a stanitsa) and the administrative center of Dinskoy District in Krasnodar Krai, Russia. Population: 34,848 (2010 census); 34,132 (2002 census); 30,873 (1989 Soviet census).

== Notable people ==
- Stepan Maryanyan, Russian Greco-Roman wrestler of Armenian descent
