= Poltavka, Poltavsky District, Omsk Oblast =

Poltavka Полтавка
- Urban-type settlement
- Interactive map of Poltavka
- Location of Poltavka Poltavka (Omsk Oblast)
- Coordinates: 54.3636°N 71.7610°E
- Country: Russia
- Federal subject: Omsk Oblast
- Administrative district: Poltavsky District
- Founded: 1895

Population (2010 Census)
  - Total: 7,042
  - Estimate (2025): 6,197 (−12%)
- Time zone: UTC+6 (MSK+3)
- Postal code: 646740
- OKTMO ID: 52648151051

Poltavka (Russian: Полтавка) is an urban locality (an urban-type settlement) in Poltavsky District of Omsk Oblast, Russia. Population: 7,042 (2010 census); 7,189 (2002 census); 7,405 (1989 Soviet census).
