= Poltavsky District =

Poltavsky District Полтавский район (Russian)
- District
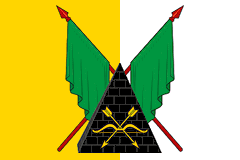
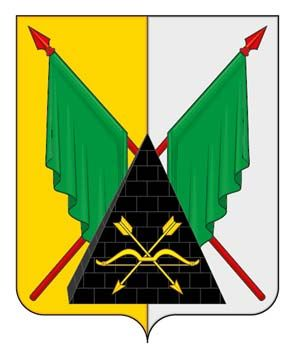
- Flag Coat of arms
- Location of Poltavsky District in Omsk Oblast
- Coordinates: 54°22′03″N 71°45′50″E
- Country: Russia
- Federal subject: Omsk Oblast
- Established: 25 May 1925
- Administrative center: Poltavka

Area
  - Total: 2,800 km^{2} (1,100 sq mi)

Population (2010 Census)
  - Total: 21,772
  - Density: 7.8/km^{2} (20/sq mi)
  - Urban: 32.3%
  - Rural: 67.7%

Administrative structure
  - Administrative divisions: 1 Work settlements, 8 Rural okrugs
  - Inhabited localities: 1 urban-type settlements, 43 rural localities

Municipal structure
  - Municipally incorporated as: Poltavsky Municipal District
  - Municipal divisions: 1 urban settlements, 8 rural settlements
- Time zone: UTC+6 (MSK+3)
- OKTMO ID: 52648000
- Website: http://poltav.omskportal.ru/

Poltavsky District (Russian: Полта́вский райо́н) is an administrative and municipal district (raion), one of the thirty-two in Omsk Oblast, Russia. It is located in the southwest of the oblast. The area of the district is 2,800 square kilometers (1,100 sq mi). Its administrative center is the urban locality (a work settlement) of Poltavka. Its 21,772 people (2010 Census) account for 32.3% of the district's total population.

== Notable residents ==
- Yury Belyayev (born 1947), film and theatre actor, Honored Artist of the Russian Federation
- Mariya Dolina (1922–2010), pilot, born in Sharovka
