= Dinskoy District =

Dinskoy District Динской район (Russian)
- District
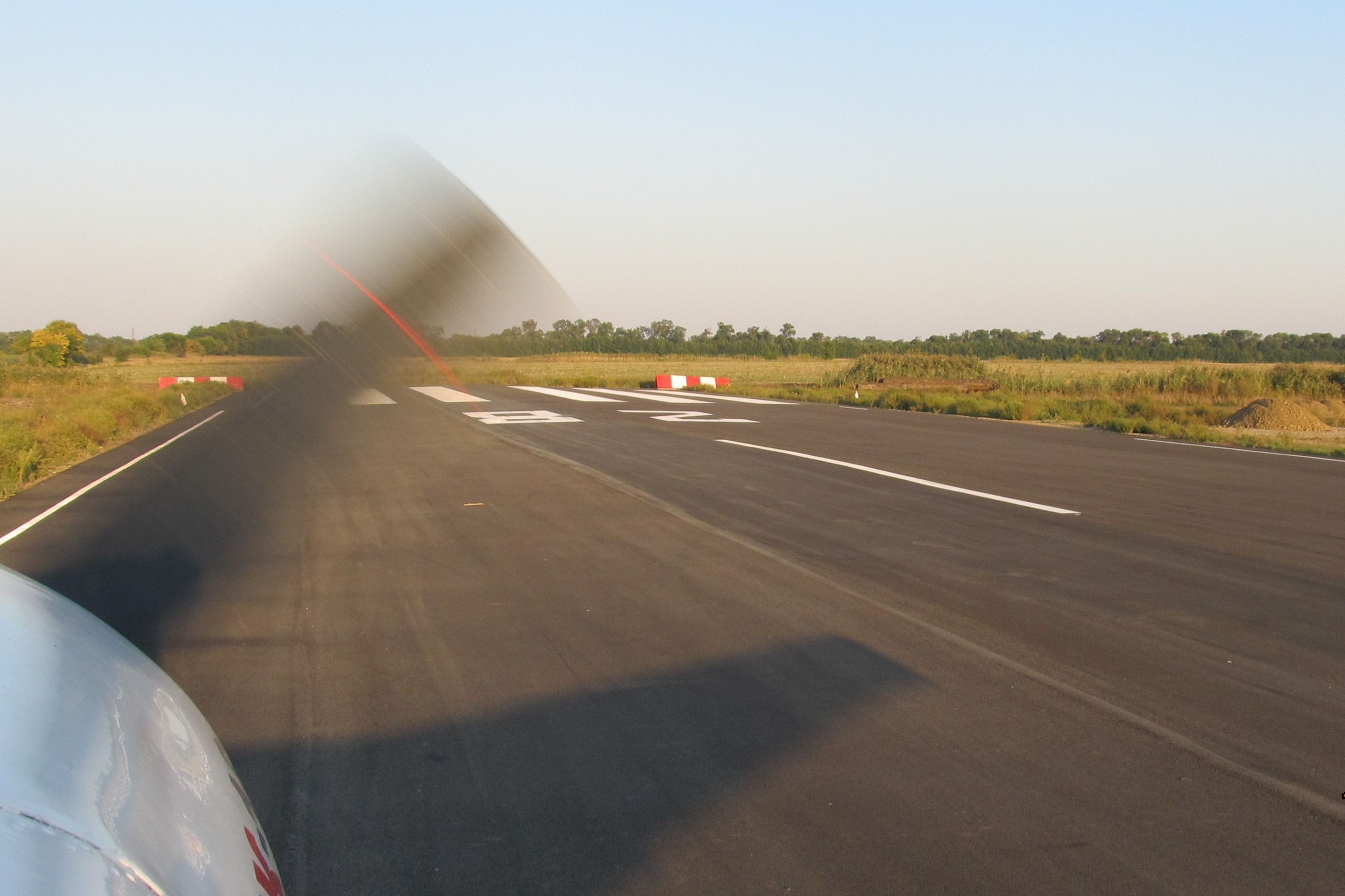
- On the runway in Dinskoy District

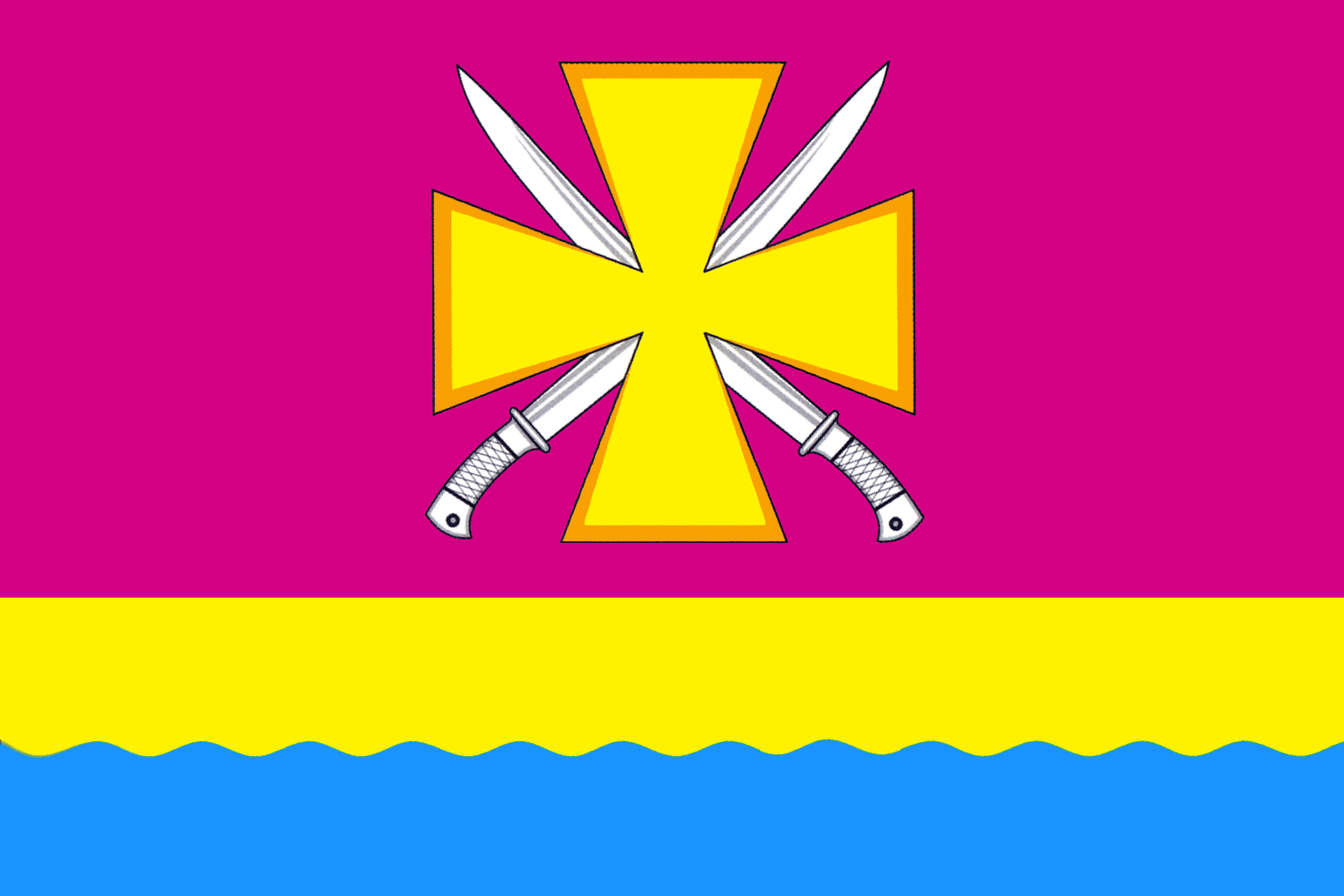
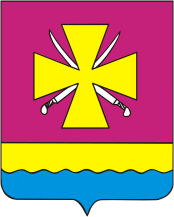
- Flag Coat of arms
- Location of Dinskoy District in Krasnodar Krai
- Coordinates: 45°12′N 39°14′E
- Country: Russia
- Federal subject: Krasnodar Krai
- Established: 1934
- Administrative center: Dinskaya

Area
  - Total: 1,361.96 km^{2} (525.86 sq mi)

Population (2010 Census)
  - Total: 126,871
  - Density: 93.1532/km^{2} (241.266/sq mi)
  - Urban: 0%
  - Rural: 100%

Administrative structure
  - Administrative divisions: 10 Rural okrugs
  - Inhabited localities: 27 rural localities

Municipal structure
  - Municipally incorporated as: Dinskoy Municipal District
  - Municipal divisions: 0 urban settlements, 10 rural settlements
- Time zone: UTC+3 (MSK)
- OKTMO ID: 03614000
- Website: http://www.dinskoi-raion.ru/

Dinskoy District (Russian: Динско́й райо́н) is an administrative district (raion), one of the thirty-eight in Krasnodar Krai, Russia. As a municipal division, it is incorporated as Dinskoy Municipal District. It is located in the center of the krai. The area of the district is 1,361.96 square kilometers (525.86 sq mi). Its administrative center is the rural locality (a stanitsa) of Dinskaya. Population: 126,871 (2010 census); 119,833 (2002 census); 105,485 (1989 Soviet census). The population of Dinskaya accounts for 27.5% of the district's total population.

Historical population
Year	Pop.	±%
1939	44,761	—
1959	45,685	+2.1%
1970	122,813	+168.8%
1979	108,913	−11.3%
1989	105,485	−3.1%
2002	119,833	+13.6%
2010	126,871	+5.9%
2021	149,370	+17.7%
Source: Census data
