= Krasnoarmeysky District, Krasnodar Krai =

Krasnoarmeysky District Красноармейский район (Russian)
- District
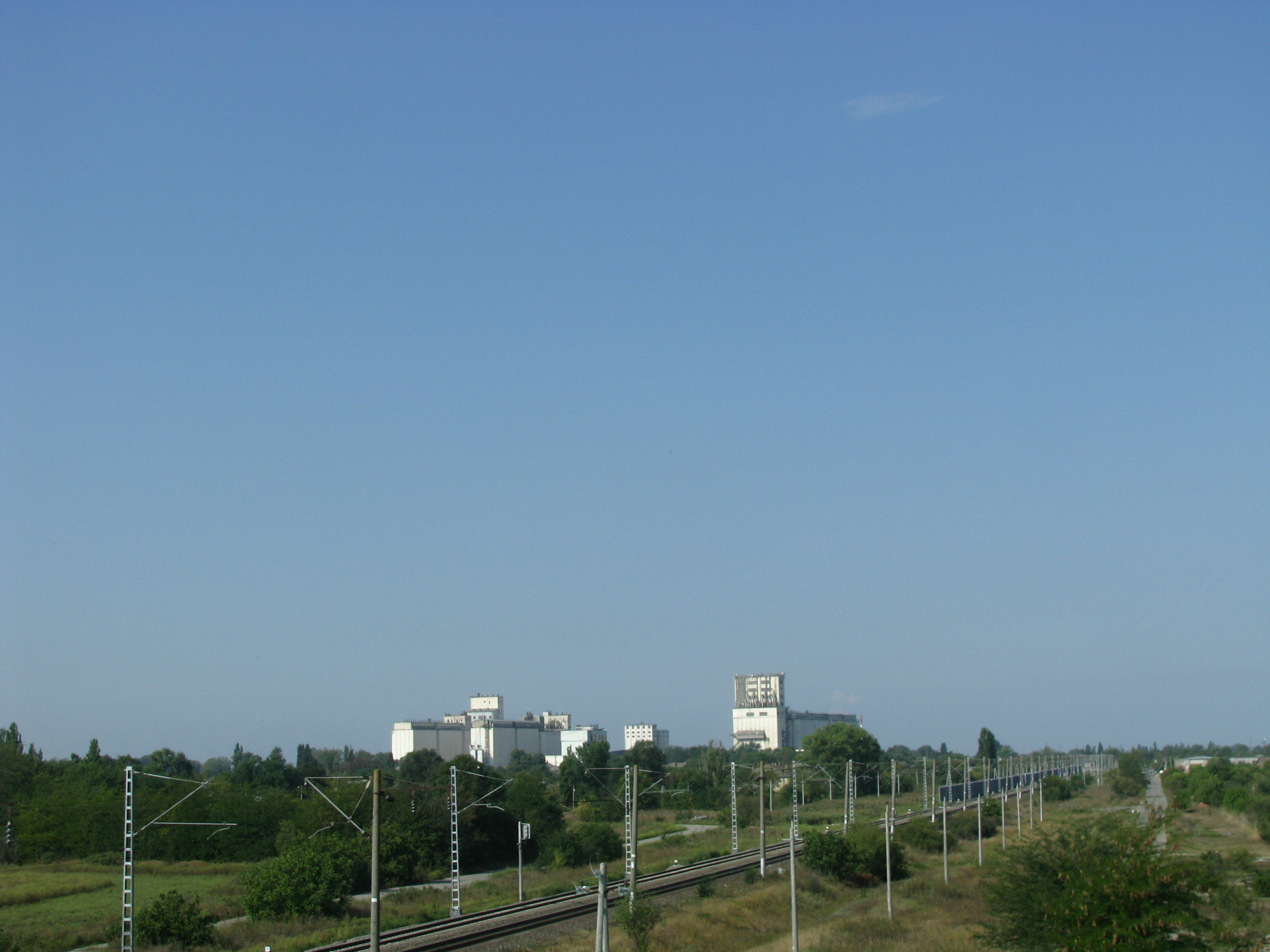
- Grain elevators in Krasnoarmeysky District

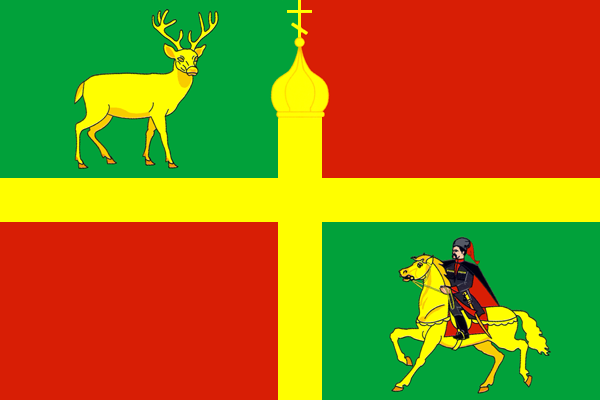
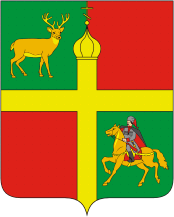
- Flag Coat of arms
- Location of Krasnoarmeysky District in Krasnodar Krai
- Coordinates: 45°20′N 38°13′E
- Country: Russia
- Federal subject: Krasnodar Krai
- Established: 1934
- Administrative center: Poltavskaya

Area
  - Total: 1,899 km^{2} (733 sq mi)

Population (2010 Census)
  - Total: 102,508
  - Density: 53.98/km^{2} (139.8/sq mi)
  - Urban: 0%
  - Rural: 100%

Administrative structure
  - Administrative divisions: 10 Rural okrugs
  - Inhabited localities: 43 rural localities

Municipal structure
  - Municipally incorporated as: Krasnoarmeysky Municipal District
  - Municipal divisions: 0 urban settlements, 10 rural settlements
- Time zone: UTC+3 (MSK)
- OKTMO ID: 03623000
- Website: http://xn--80aaatpfbbbetkjejtegih.xn--p1ai/

Krasnoarmeysky District (Russian: Красноарме́йский райо́н) is an administrative district (raion), one of the thirty-eight in Krasnodar Krai, Russia. As a municipal division, it is incorporated as Krasnoarmeysky Municipal District. It is located in the center of the krai. The area of the district is 1,899 square kilometers (733 sq mi). Its administrative center is the rural locality (a stanitsa) of Poltavskaya. Population: 102,508 (2010 census); 103,874 (2002 census); 93,434 (1989 Soviet census). The population of Poltavskaya accounts for 25.8% of the district's total population.

Historical population
Year	Pop.	±%
1939	52,815	—
1959	64,369	+21.9%
1970	93,576	+45.4%
1979	89,271	−4.6%
1989	93,434	+4.7%
2002	103,874	+11.2%
2010	102,508	−1.3%
2021	101,449	−1.0%
Source: Census data

== Notable people ==
- Vladimir Abazarov, discoverer of the largest Russian Samotlor oil field
