= Timashevsky District =

Timashevsky District Тимашёвский район (Russian)
- District
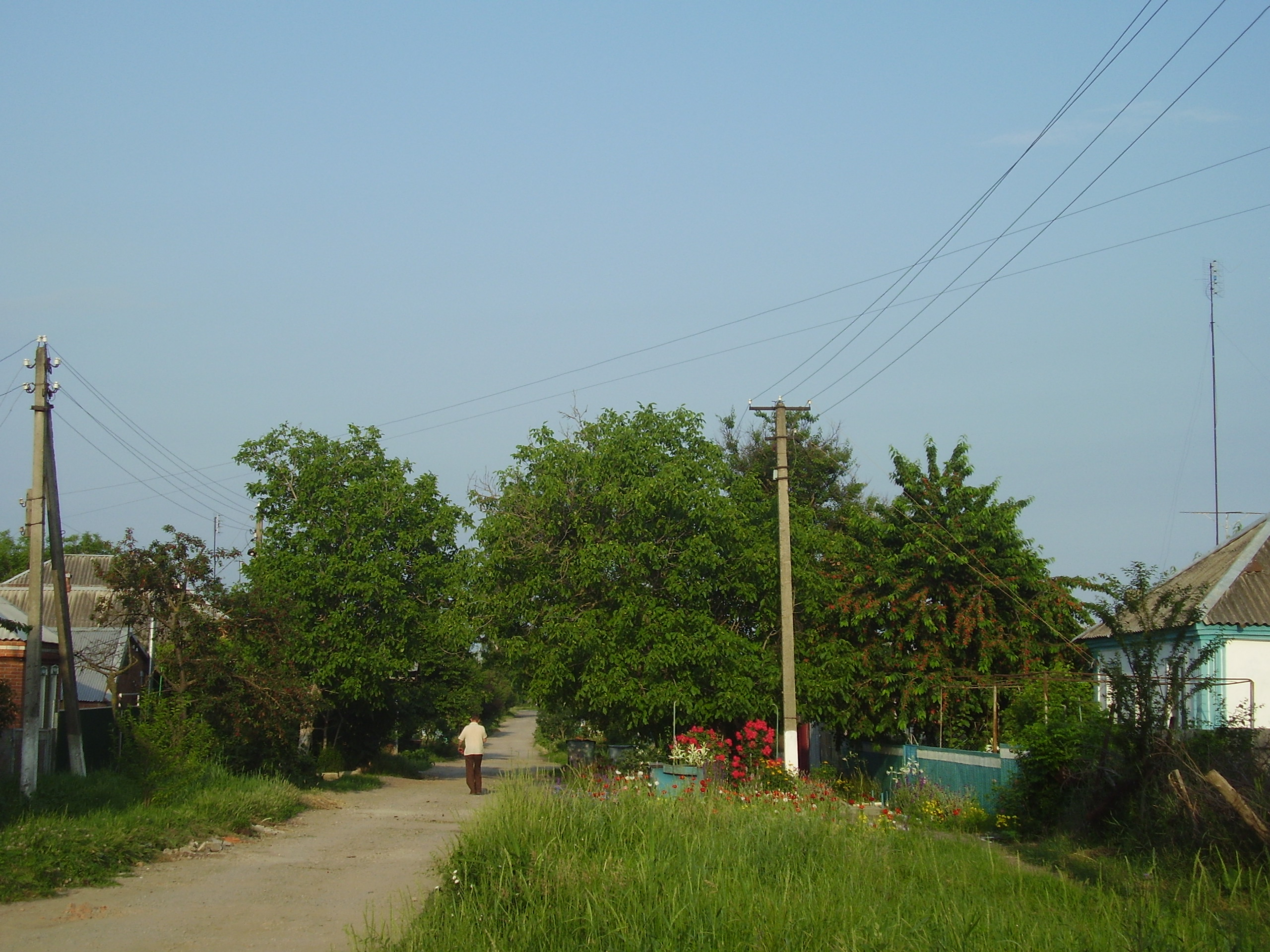
- Street in Timashevsky, Timashevsky District

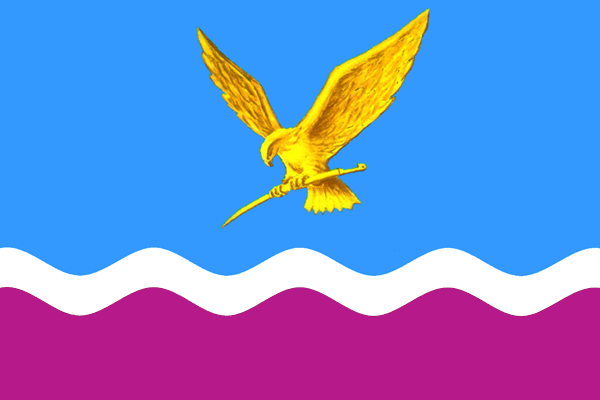
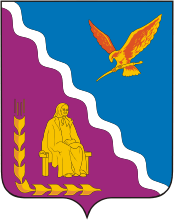
- Flag Coat of arms
- Location of Timashevsky District in Krasnodar Krai
- Coordinates: 45°37′N 38°58′E
- Country: Russia
- Federal subject: Krasnodar Krai
- Established: 2 June 1924
- Administrative center: Timashyovsk

Area
  - Total: 1,506.4 km^{2} (581.6 sq mi)

Population (2010 Census)
  - Total: 106,130
  - Density: 70.453/km^{2} (182.47/sq mi)
  - Urban: 50.8%
  - Rural: 49.2$

Administrative structure
  - Administrative divisions: 1 Towns, 9 Rural okrugs
  - Inhabited localities: 1 cities/towns, 40 rural localities

Municipal structure
  - Municipally incorporated as: Timashevsky Municipal District
  - Municipal divisions: 1 urban settlements, 9 rural settlements
- Time zone: UTC+3 (MSK)
- OKTMO ID: 03653000
- Website: http://www.timregion.ru/

Timashevsky District (Russian: Тимашёвский райо́н) is an administrative district (raion), one of the thirty-eight in Krasnodar Krai, Russia. As a municipal division, it is incorporated as Timashevsky Municipal District. It is located in the center of the krai. The area of the district is 1,506.4 square kilometers (581.6 sq mi). Its administrative center is the town of Timashevsk. Population: 106,130 (2010 census); 107,189 (2002 census); 91,851 (1989 Soviet census). The population of Timashevsk accounts for 50.8% of the district's total population.
