= Anapa (disambiguation) =

Anapa is a city in Krasnodar Krai, Russia

Anapa may also refer to:

- Anapa Urban Okrug, a municipal formation in Krasnodar Krai, Russia
- Anapa Airport, an airport in the city of Anapa, Krasnodar Krai, Russia

== See also ==
- Anapsky District
- FC Spartak-UGP Anapa
