= Vityazevo, Krasnodar Krai =

Vityazevo Витязево
- Selo

Other transcription(s)
  - Greek: Βίτιαζεβο
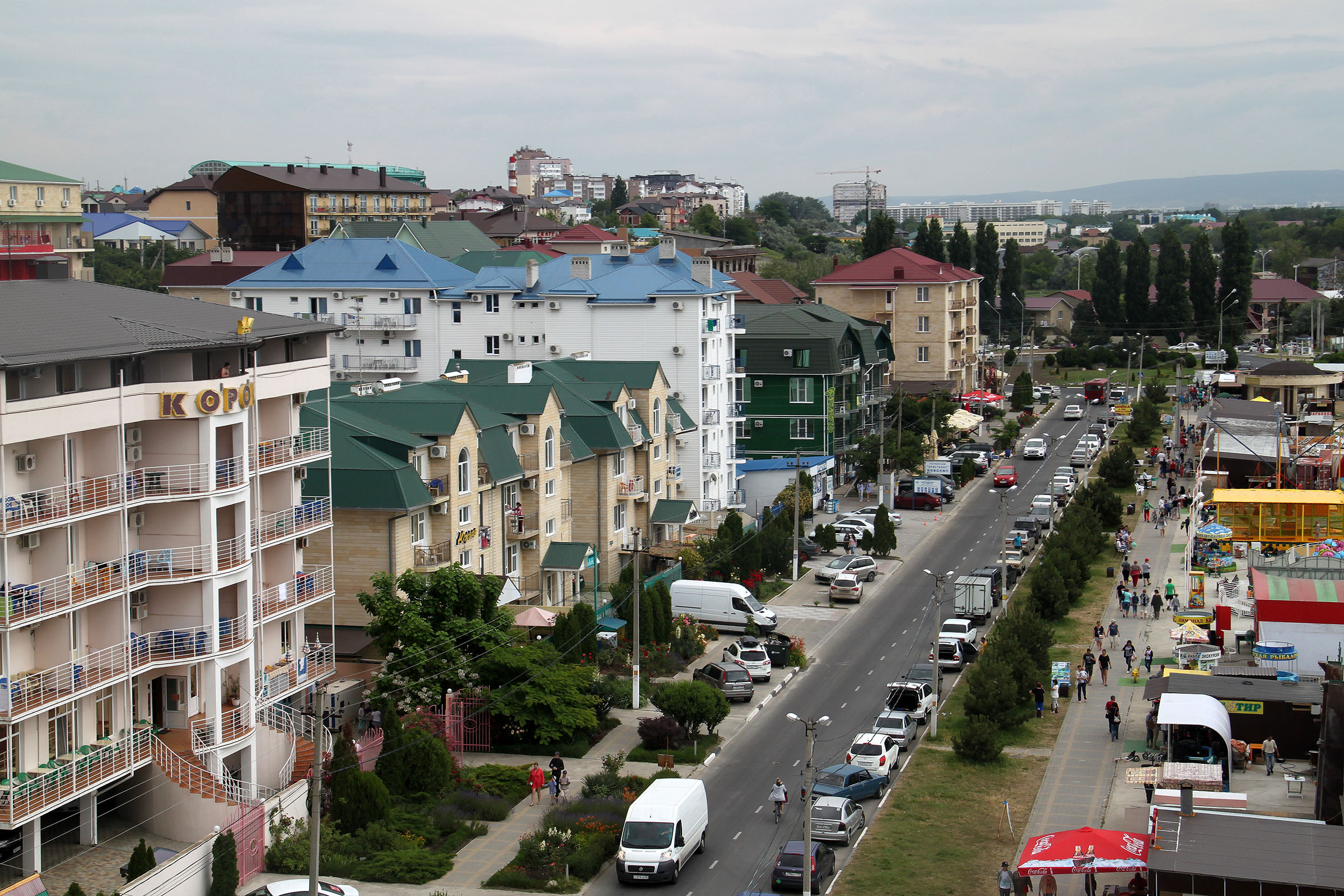
- View of Vityazevo
- Interactive map of Vityazevo
- Location of Vityazevo Vityazevo (Krasnodar Krai)
- Coordinates: 44°59′N 37°16′E
- Country: Russia
- Federal subject: Krasnodar Krai
- Founded: 1837
- Rural locality status since: January 2005
- Elevation: 7 m (23 ft)

Population (2010 Census)
  - Total: 7,936
  - Estimate (1926): 1,161 (−85.4%)

Administrative status
  - Subordinated to: Town of Anapa

Municipal status
  - Urban okrug: Anapa Urban Okrug
- Time zone: UTC+3 (MSK)
- Postal code: 353417
- OKTMO ID: 03703000166

Vityazevo (Russian: Витязево, Greek: Βίτιαζεβο) is a rural locality (a selo) in Vityazevsky Rural Okrug under the administrative jurisdiction of the Town of Anapa in Krasnodar Krai, Russia, located 11 kilometers (6.8 mi) north of Anapa proper on a bank of the Vityazevsky liman. Population: 7,936 (2010 census); 6,026 (2002 census); 5,268 (1989 Soviet census).

== History ==
The stanitsa of Vityazevskaya, named after Major Vityaz, existed in this location from 1837 to 1862. In 1862, it became the settlement of Vityazevskoye.

Vityazevo had urban-type settlement status until January 1, 2005.

== Sights and recreation ==
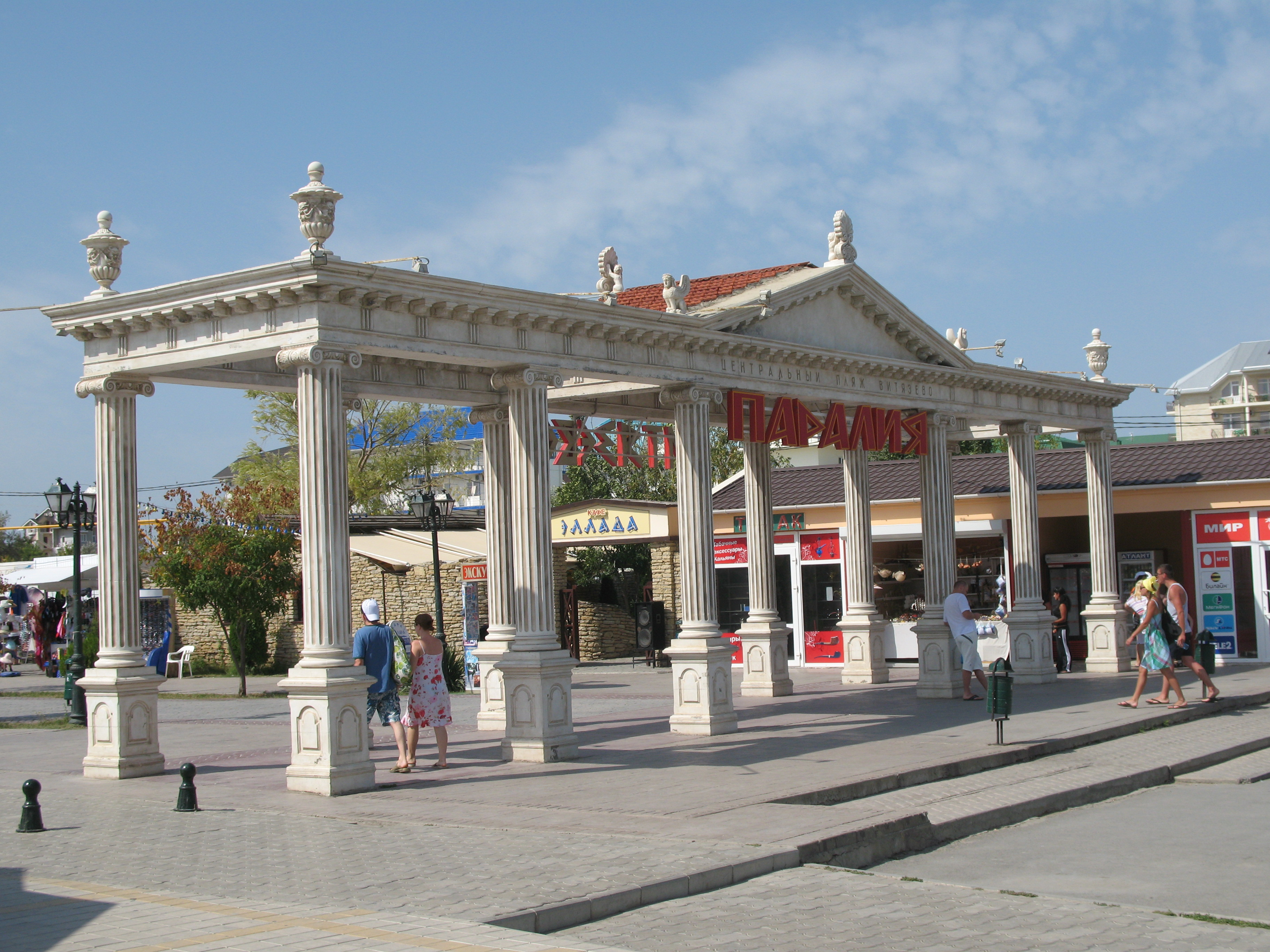
The "Paralia" embankment

The "Paralia" embankment, built in ancient Greek style, is the main attraction in Vityazevo.

Vityazevo has a beach, which is about 200 meters (660 ft) wide. Vityazevo is also known for its peloids.

Vityazevo is surrounded by vineyards and has a winery.

== Gallery ==
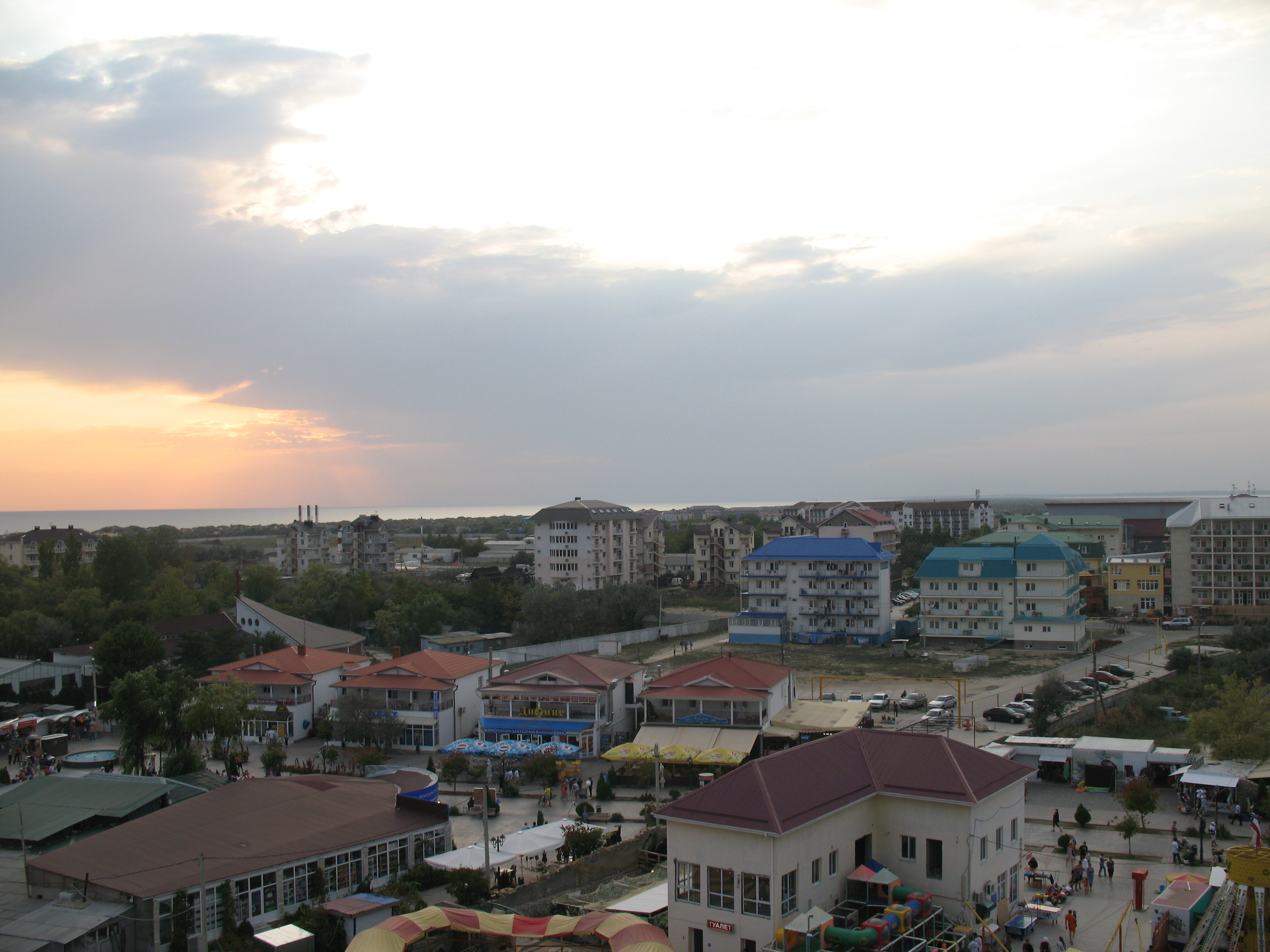

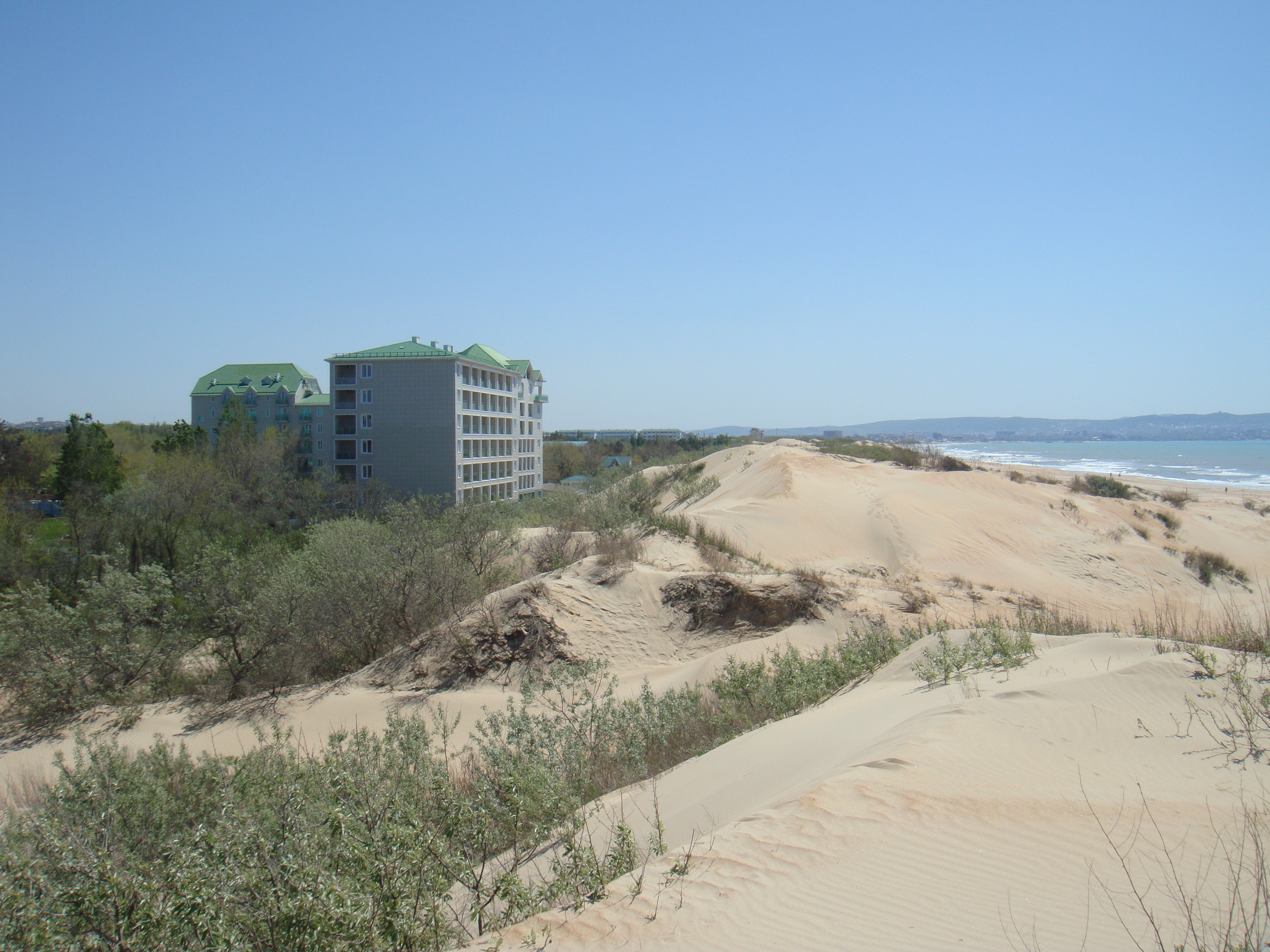

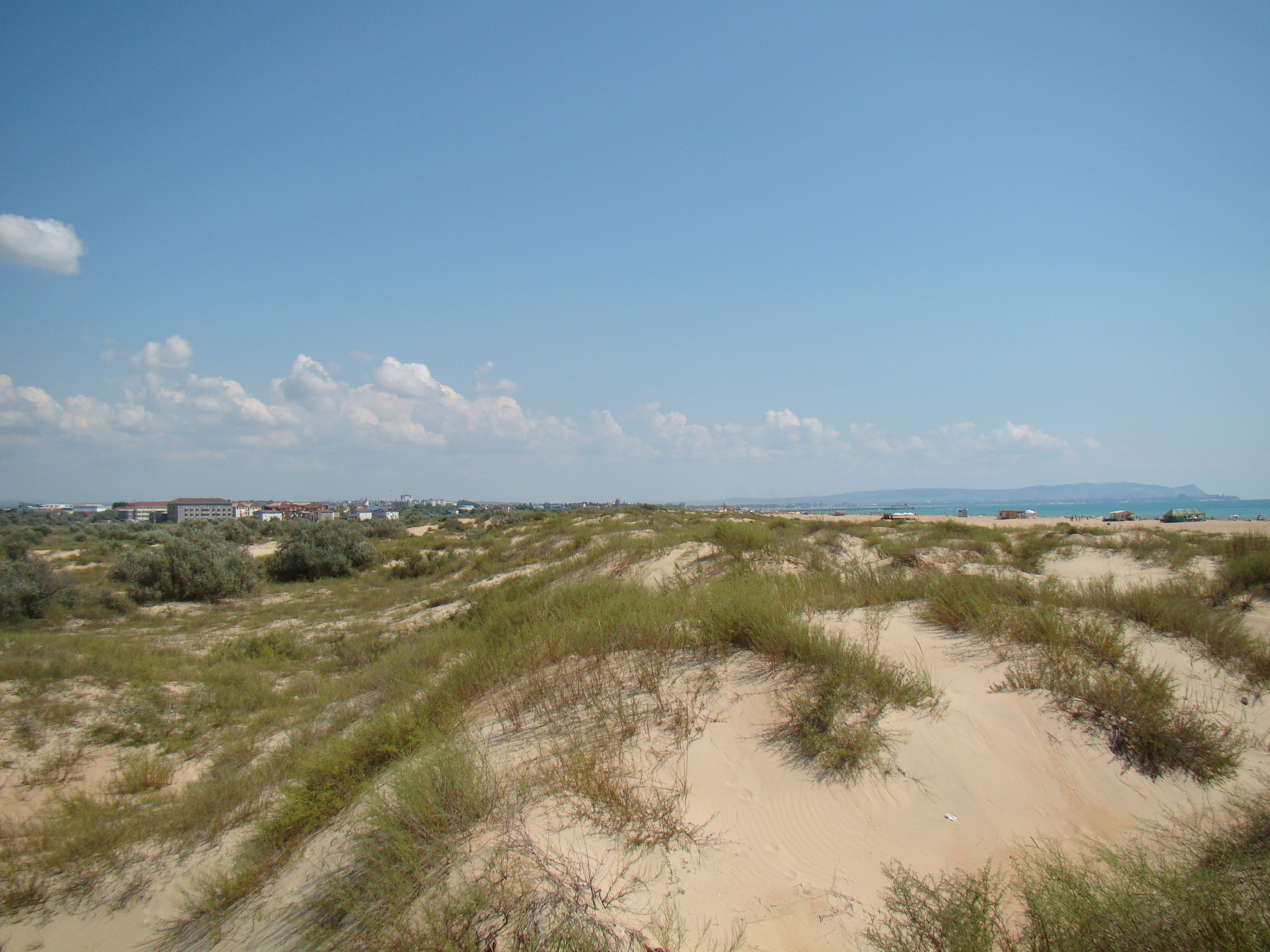

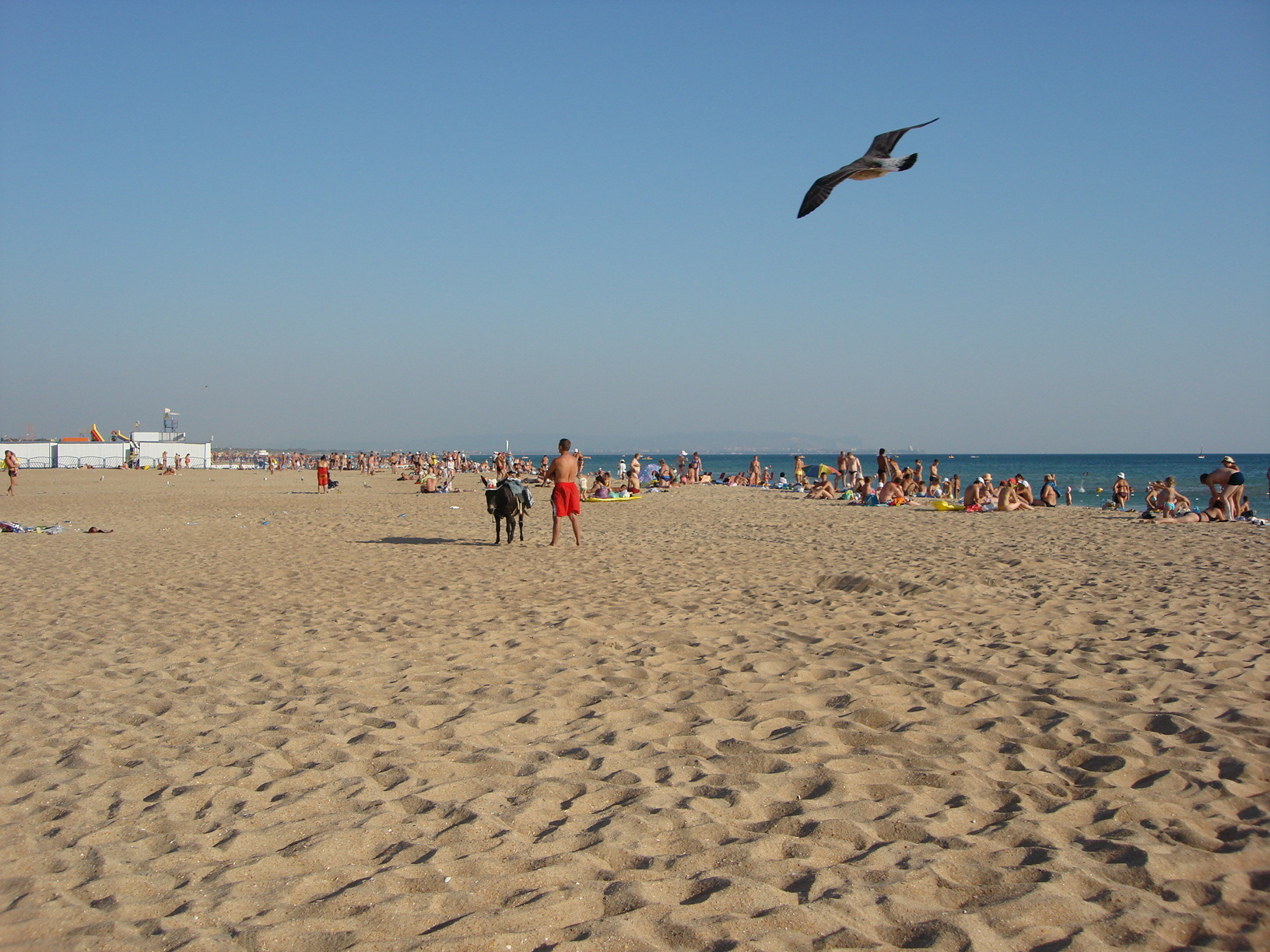

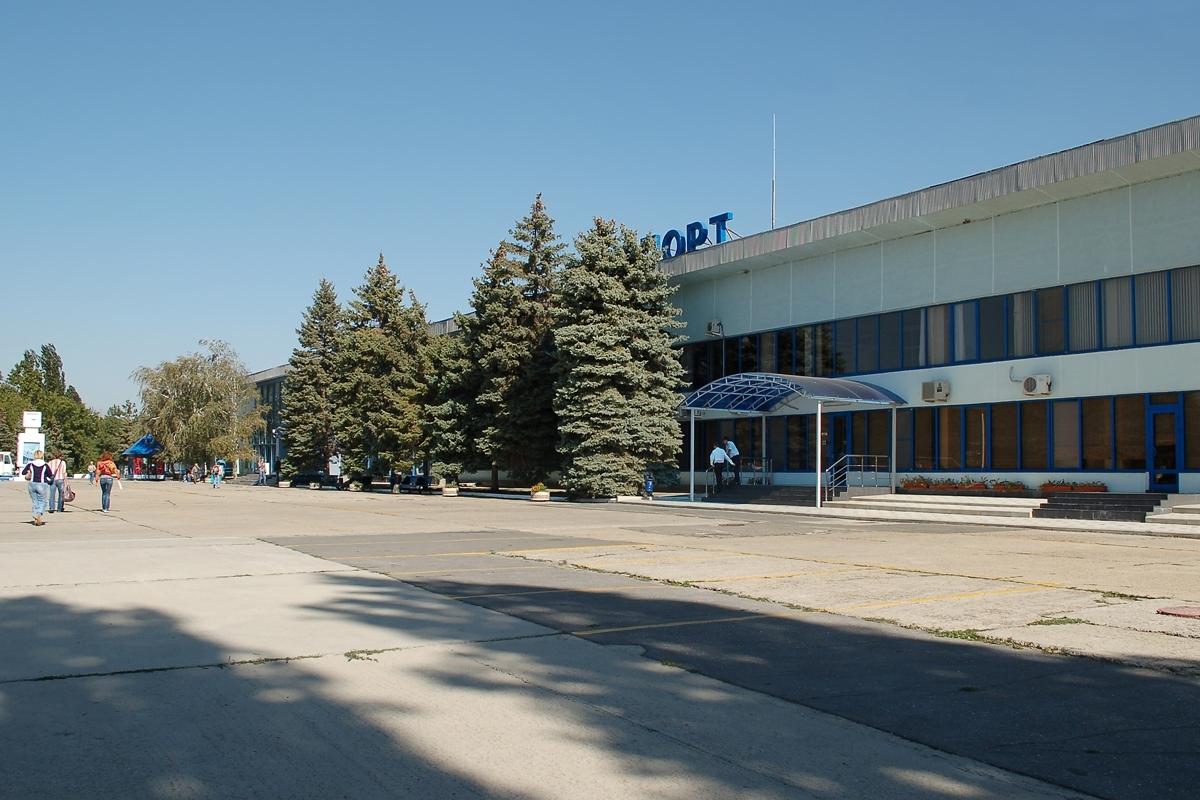

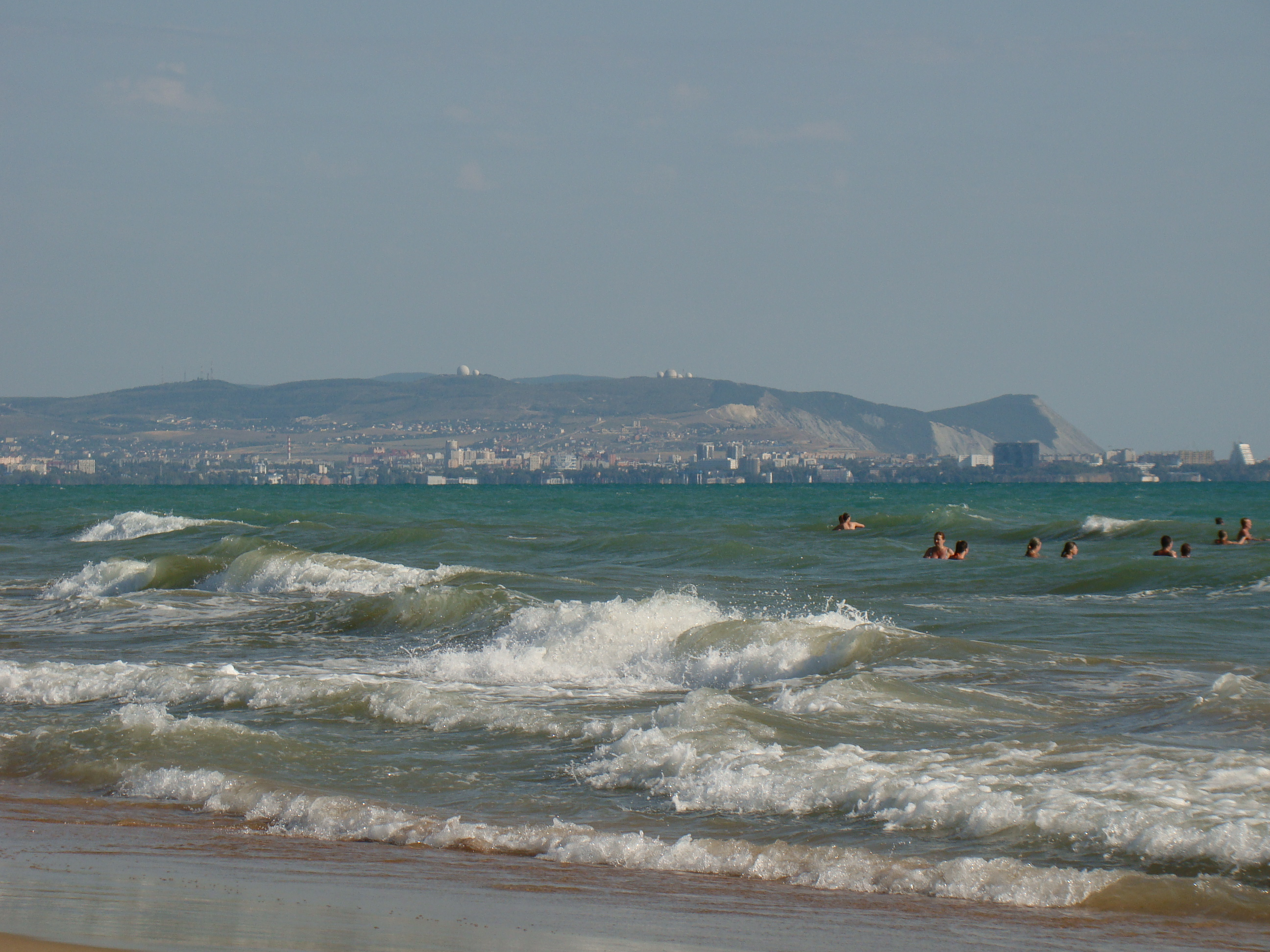

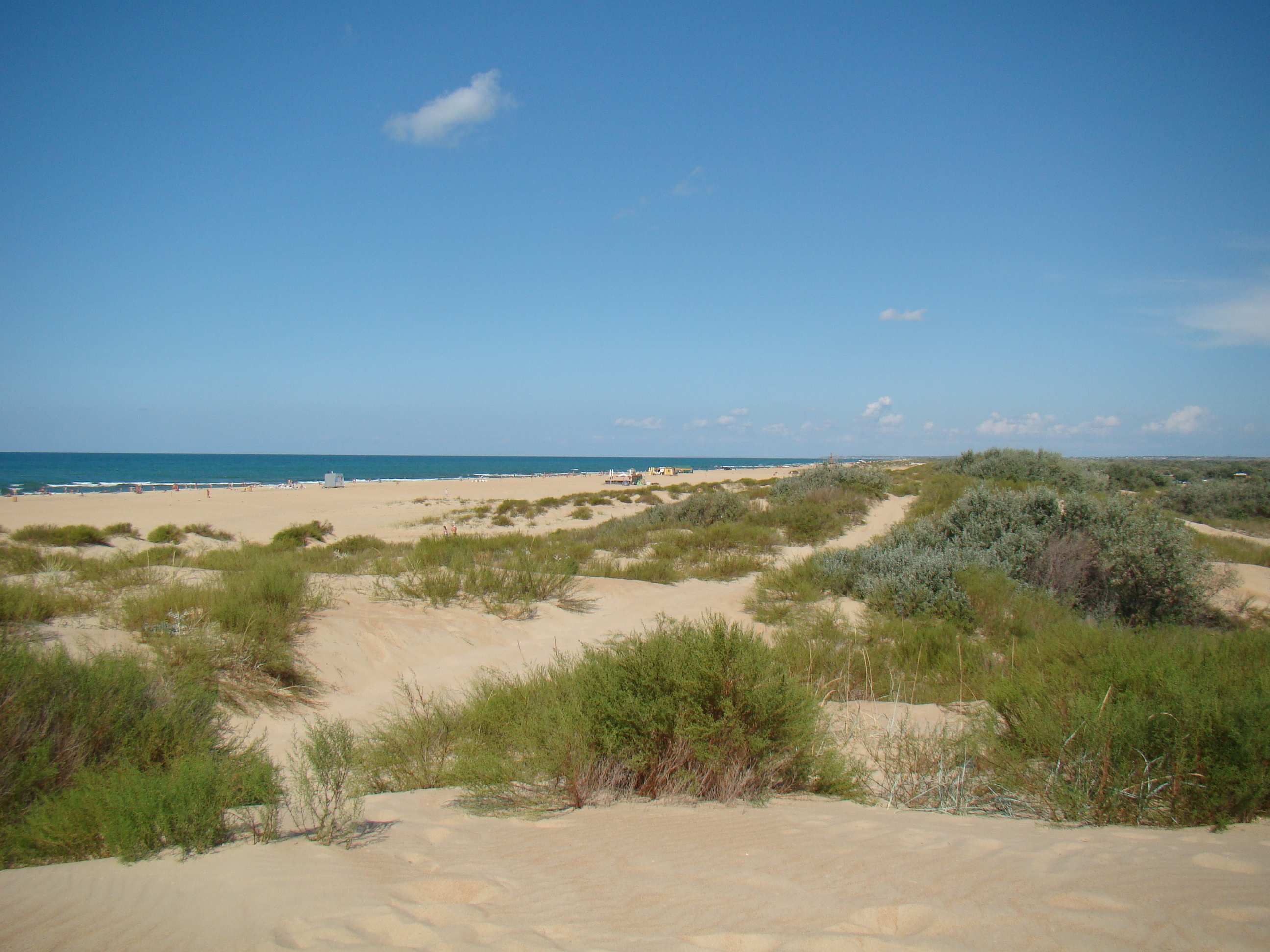

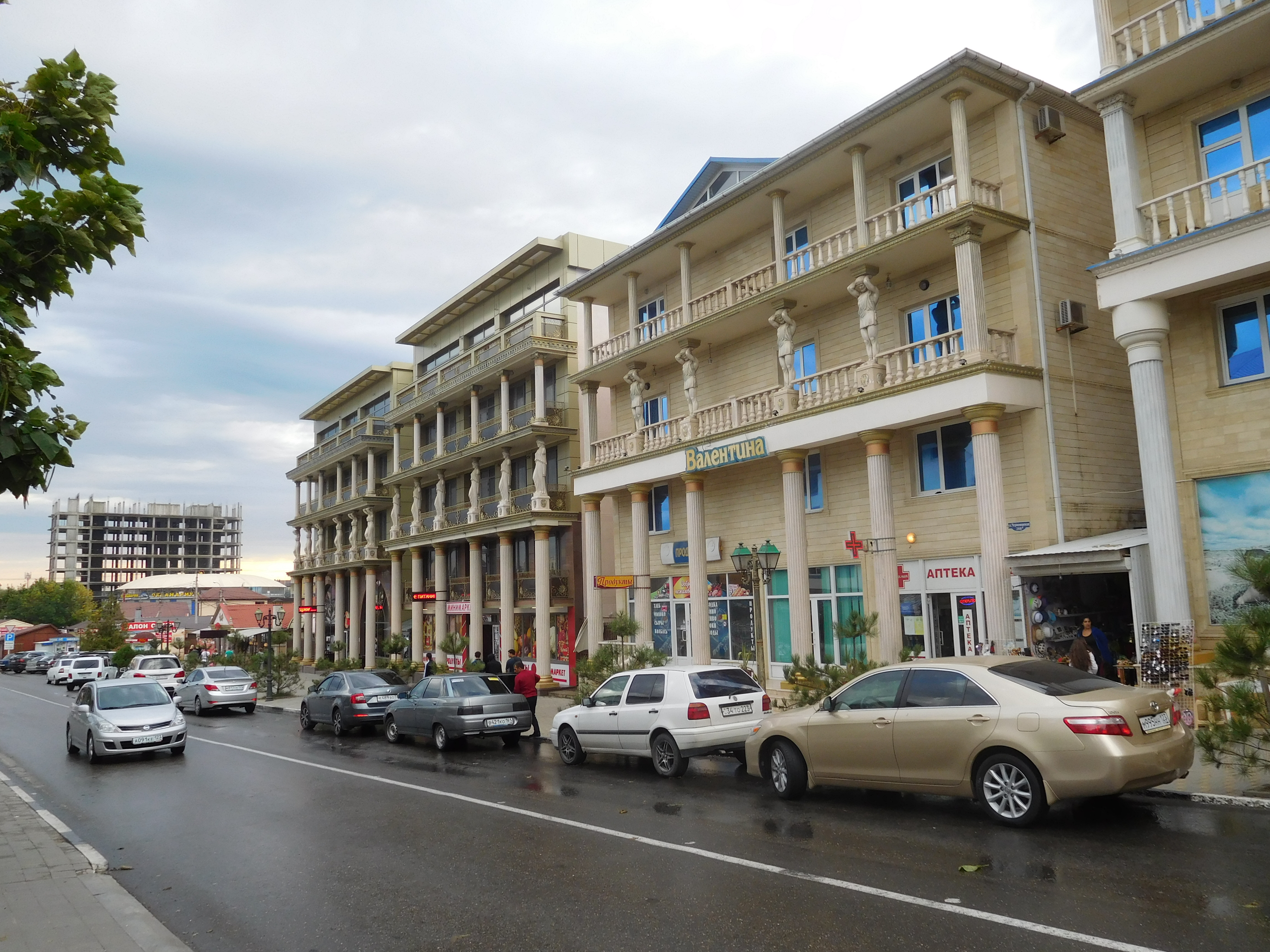

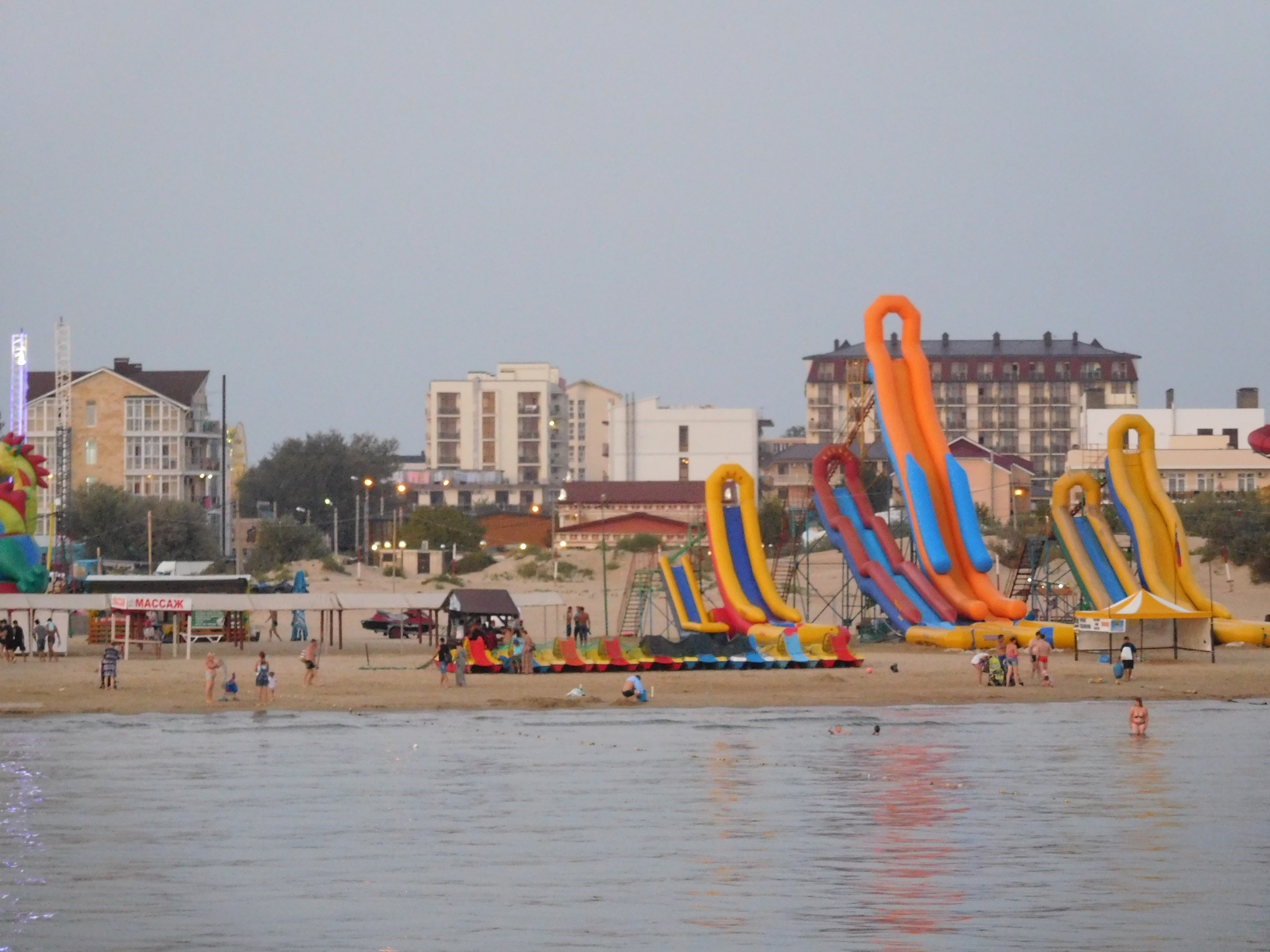

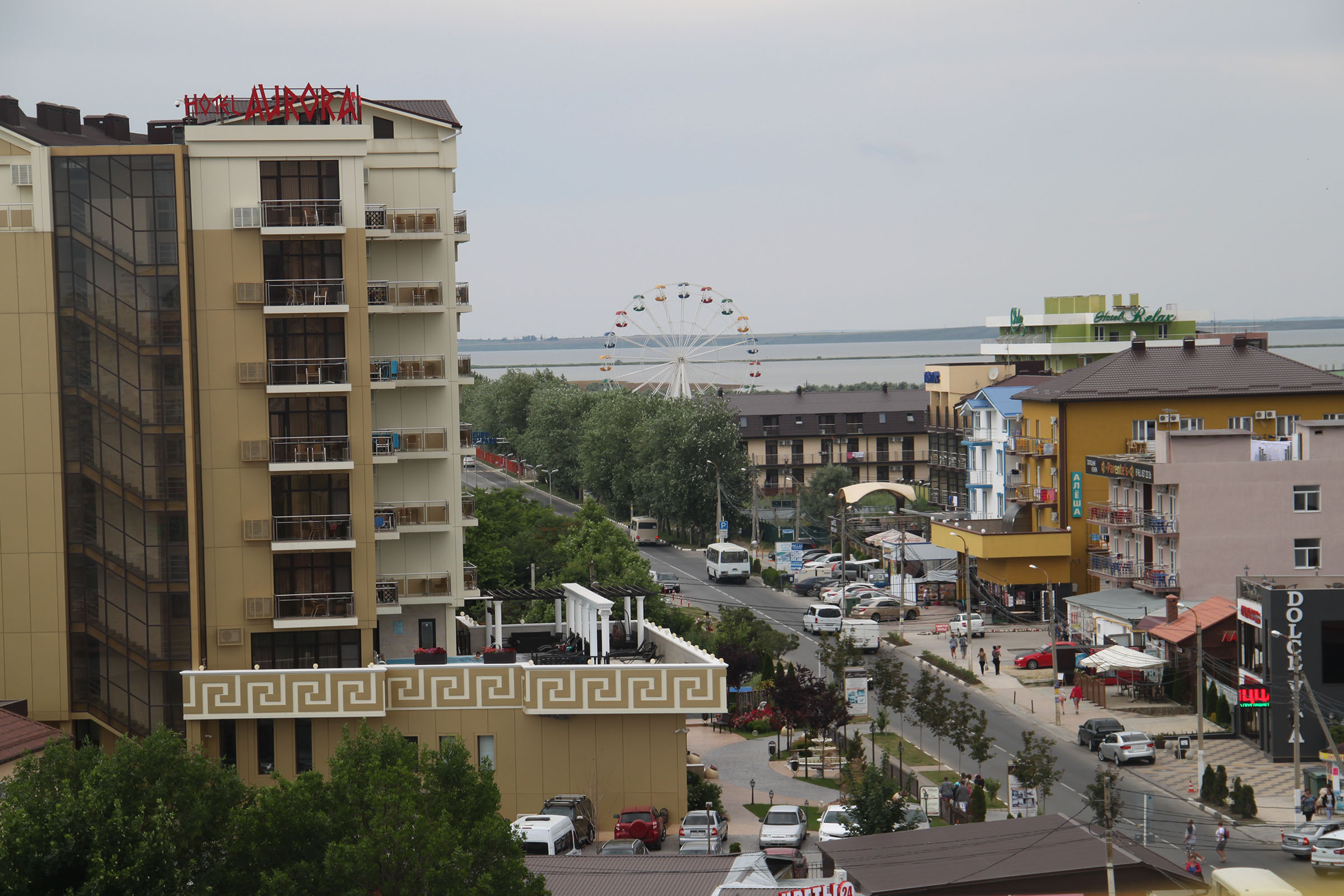
