= Anapsky =

Anapsky (masculine), Anapskaya (feminine), or Anapskoye (neuter) may refer to:

- Anapsky District, a district of Krasnodar Krai, Russia
- Anapsky (rural locality) (Anapskaya, Anapskoye), name of several rural localities in Russia
