= Sukko =

Rural locality in Anapsky District of Krasnodar Krai, Russia

Coordinates: 44°48′N 37°25′E

Sukko (Russian: Сукко) is a rural locality (a selo) in Anapsky District of Krasnodar Krai, Russia, located 13 kilometers (8.1 mi) south of Anapa on the shore of the Black Sea and serving as a resort. Population: 3,156 (2010 Census).

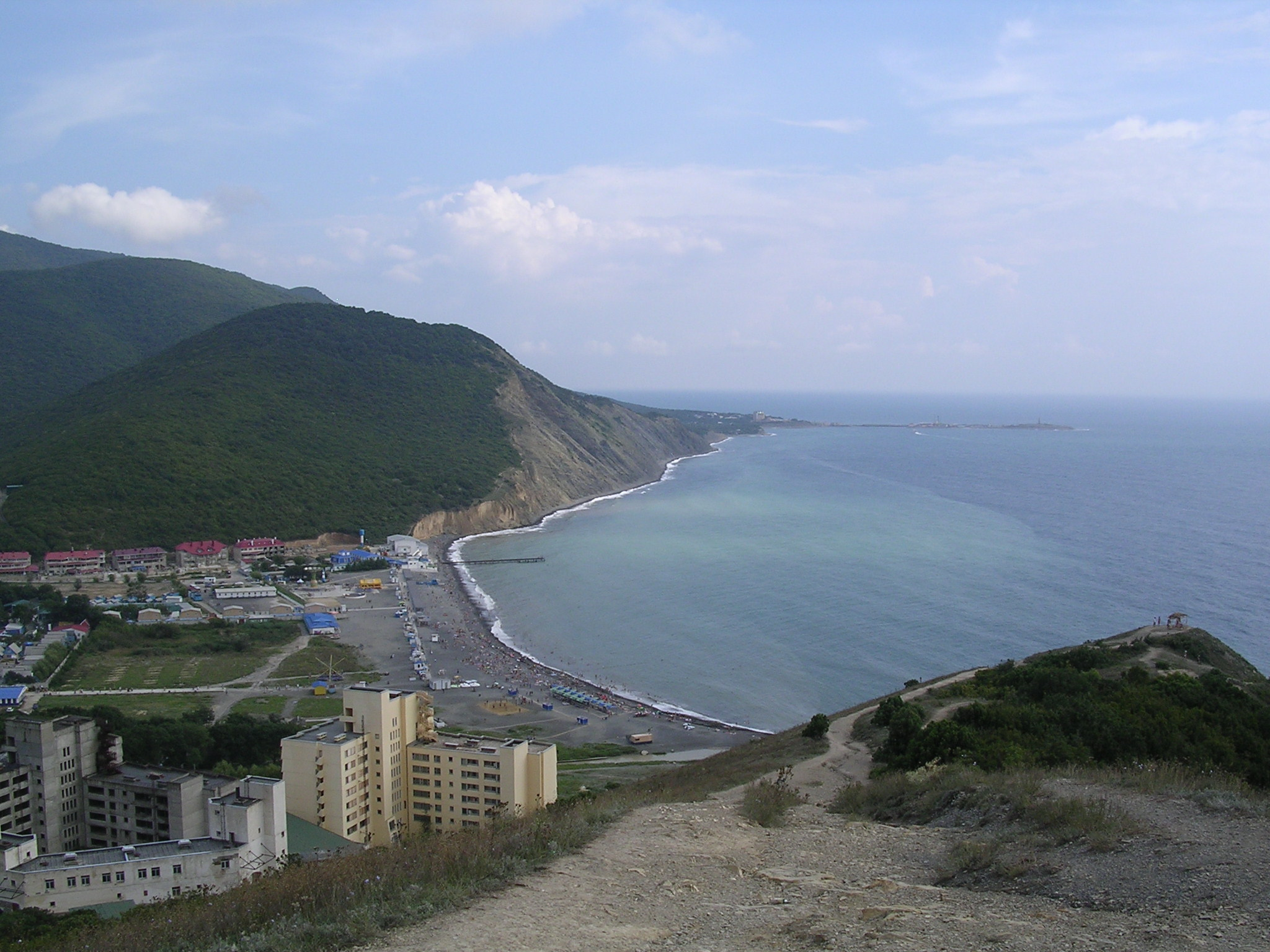
The Sukko Valley

It lies in the north of the Abrau Peninsula, in the valley of the small Sukko River wedged between the westernmost spurs of the Caucasus Mountains, otherwise known as the Markotkh. The valley consists of beech, oak, pine and juniper forests. Sukko is a frequent shooting location for the long-running Yeralash comedy show. Between Sukko and the seaside selo of Bolshoy Utrish sprawls the Bolshoy Utrish protected area (zakaznik).

== Gallery ==
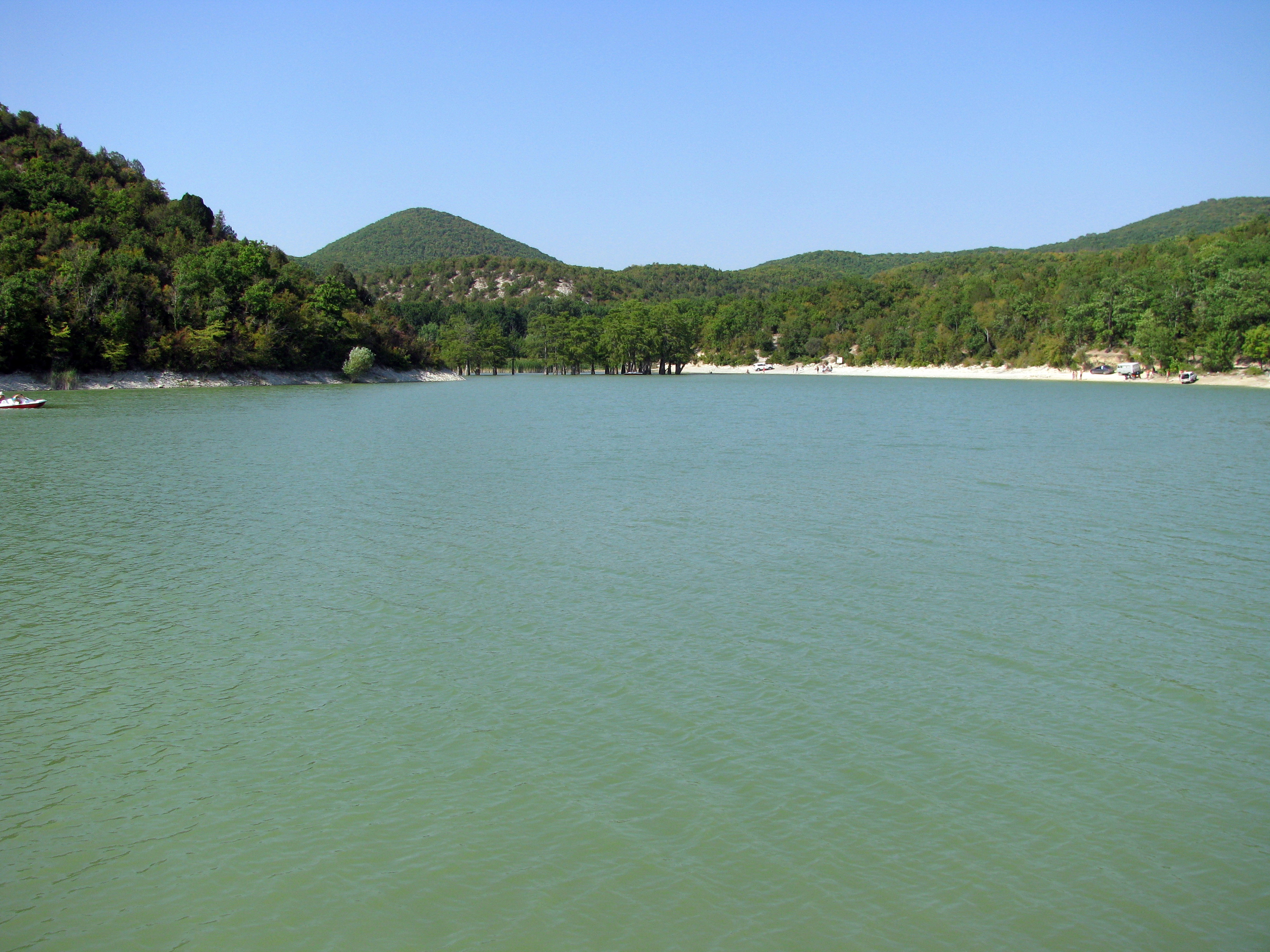
Cypress Lake in Sukko, Russia

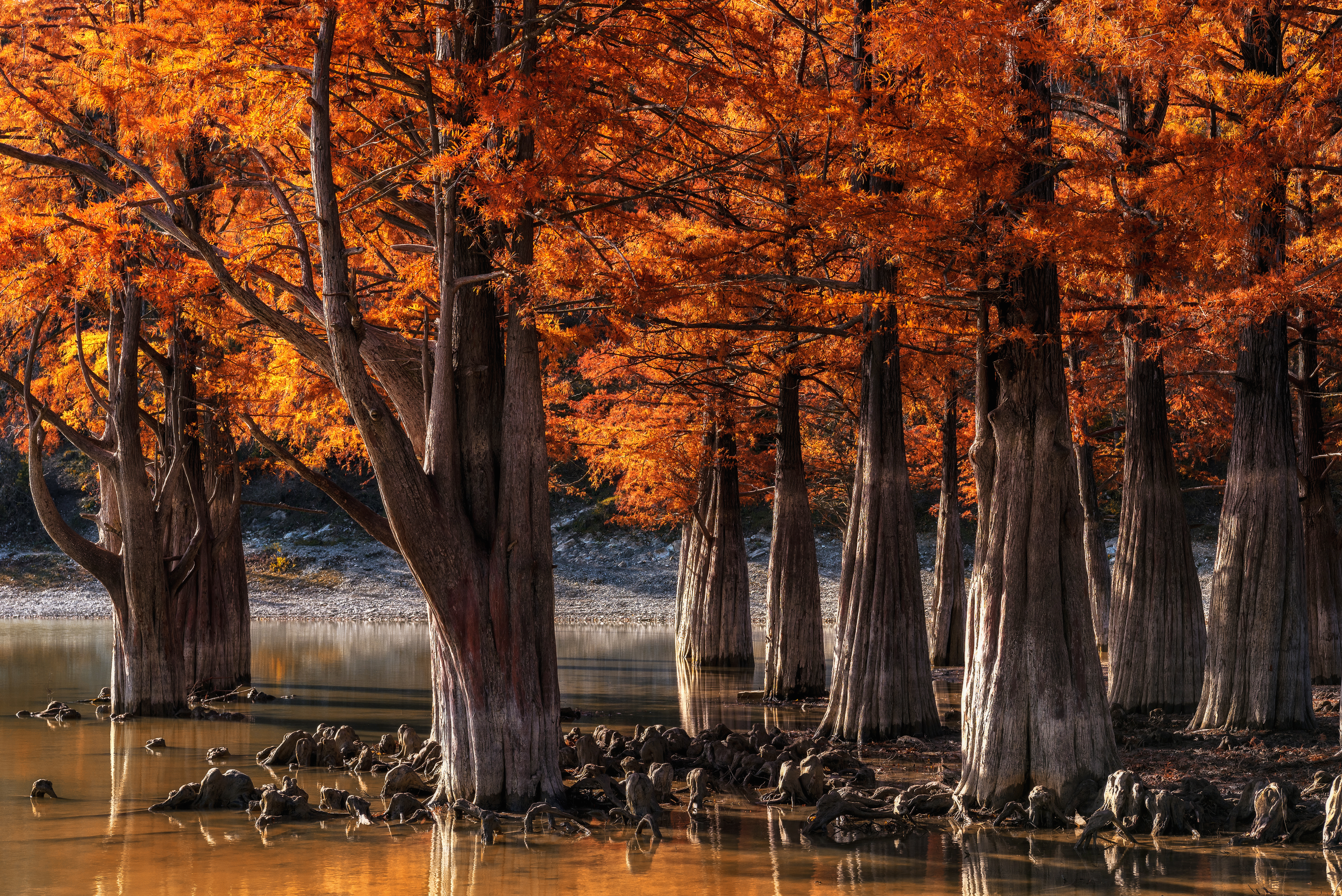
Bald Cypresses near Sukko
