= Anapsky (rural locality) =

Anapsky (Russian: Анапский; masculine), Anapskaya (Анапская; feminine), or Anapskoye (Анапское; neuter) is the name of several rural localities in Krasnodar Krai, Russia:

- Anapsky, Korenovsky District, Krasnodar Krai, a khutor in Novoberezansky Rural Okrug of Korenovsky District
- Anapsky, Krymsky District, Krasnodar Krai, a khutor in Keslerovsky Rural Okrug of Krymsky District
- Anapskaya, a stanitsa in Anapsky Rural Okrug of Anapsky District of Krasnodar Krai
