= Abrau Peninsula =

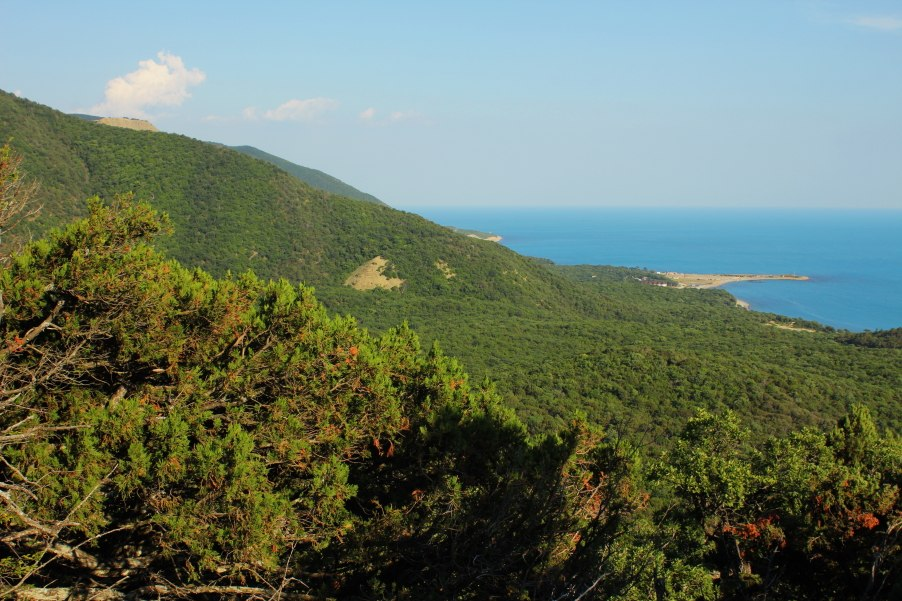
- View of the coast of Utrish Nature Reserve

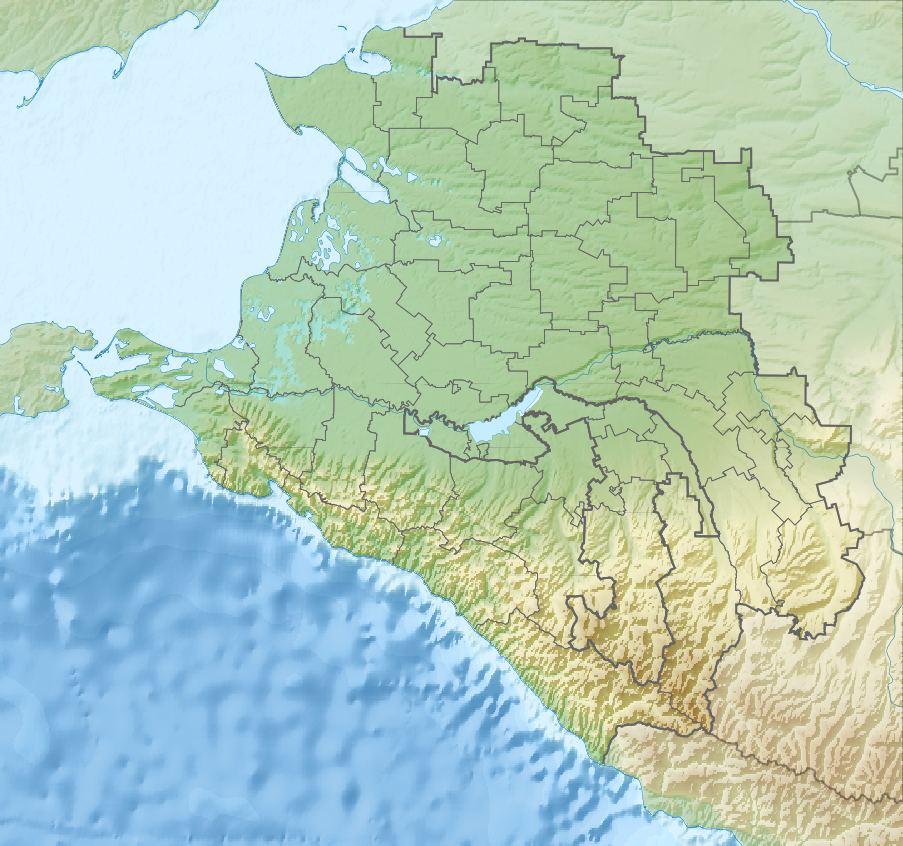
- Location within Krasnodar Krai Location within European Russia

Geography
- Location: Krasnodar Krai, Russia
- Coordinates: 44.79°N 37.53°E
- Adjacent to: Black Sea

Administration
- Russia

The Abrau Peninsula is a north-western spur of the Greater Caucasus Mountain Range, located on the Black Sea between Novorossiysk and Anapa, in the Krasnodar Region of Russia. It contains the Utrish State Nature Reserve.

== Climate and ecology ==
The Abrau Peninsula is the only place in Russia that harbours a Mediterranean vegetation. The climate of the Abrau Peninsula is sub-Mediterranean with cool rainy winters without a stable snow cover and with hot dry summers. The mean annual precipitation is 500 mm, the mean July and February temperatures are 23.7 °C and 2.7 °C, respectively. The area vegetation consists of three major belts: (1) coastal slopes with sub-Mediterranean xerophytic forests and shrublands with pistachio (Pistacia mutica), juniper (Juniperus excelsa, J. oxycedrus, J. foetidissima), oak (Quercus pubescens) and oriental hornbeam (Carpinus orientalis); (2) piedmont and low-mountain area with a combination of mesophitic and xerophytic forests and a predominance of two oak species (Q. pubescens, Q. petraea), oriental hornbeam and junipers; (3) low mountains with mesophitic deciduous forests with a domination of oak (Q. petraea), hornbeam (Carpinus caucasica), lime (Tilia begoniifolia), maple (Acer laetum), ash (Fraxinus excelsior) and beech (Fagus orientalis).
