= Anapa Urban Okrug =

- District
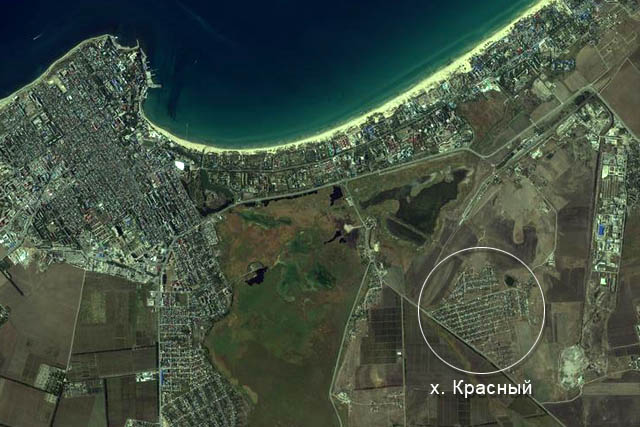

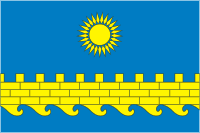
- Flag Coat of arms
- Coordinates: 46°30′9.0″N 38°10′21.0″E
- Country: Russia
- Federal subject: Krasnodar Krai
- Established: 2006
- Administrative center: Anapa

Area
  - Total: 981.86 km^{2} (379.10 sq mi)
- Time zone: UTC+3 (MSK)
- OKTMO ID: 03703000

Anapa Urban Okrug (Russian: городско́й о́круг Ана́па) is a municipal formation (an urban okrug) in Krasnodar Krai, Russia, one of the seven urban okrugs in the krai. Its territory comprises the territories of two administrative divisions of Krasnodar Krai — Anapsky District and the Town of Anapa. The area of the urban okrug is 981.86 square kilometers (379.10 sq mi).

The municipal formation was established on September 16, 1996. Urban okrug status was granted to it by the Law of Krasnodar Krai #676-KZ of April 1, 2004.
