= Anapa =

Town in Krasnodar Krai, Russia

Anapa Анапа
- Town

Other transcription(s)
  - Adyghe: Быгъуркъал
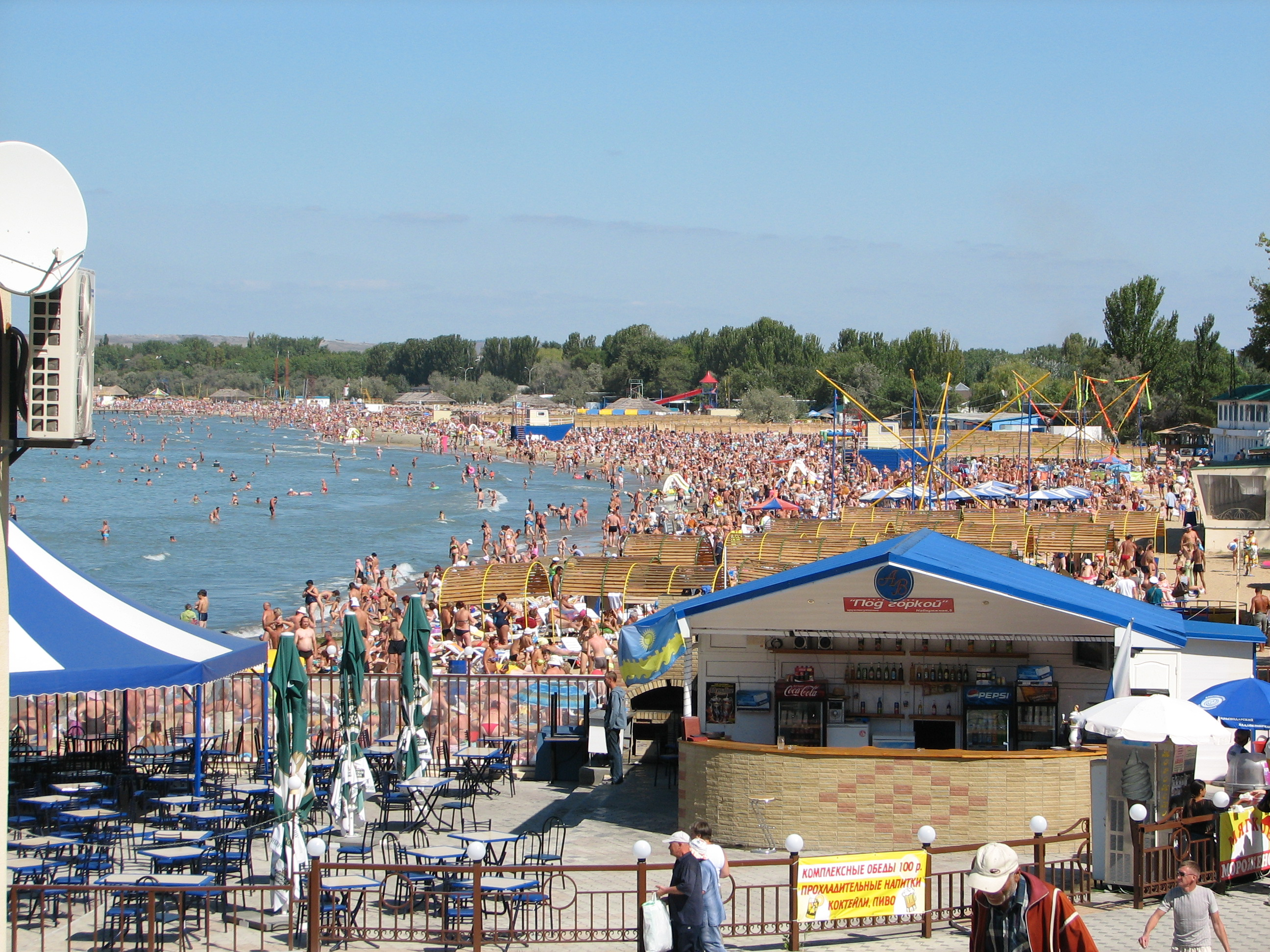
- A beach in Anapa

- Flag Coat of arms
- Interactive map of Anapa
- Location of Anapa Anapa (European Russia) Anapa (Black Sea) Anapa (Europe) Anapa (Earth)
- Coordinates: 44°53′40″N 37°19′00″E
- Country: Russia
- Federal subject: Krasnodar Krai
- Founded: 14th century
- Town status since: 1846

Government
  - Mayor: Vasily Shvets
- Elevation: 20 m (66 ft)

Population (2010 Census)
  - Total: 58,990
  - Estimate (2025): 84,804 (+43.8%)
  - Rank: 280th in 2010

Administrative status
  - Subordinated to: Town of Anapa
  - Capital of: Town of Anapa, Anapsky District

Municipal status
  - Urban okrug: Anapa Urban Okrug
  - Capital of: Anapa Urban Okrug
- Time zone: UTC+3 (MSK)
- Postal code: 353440—353458
- Dialing code: +7 86133
- OKTMO ID: 03703000001
- Website: www.anapa-official.ru

Anapa (Russian: Анапа, Adyghe: Быгъуркъал, Bəġ˚rq̇al, Ukrainian: Анапа) is a town in Krasnodar Krai, Russia, located on the northern coast of the Black Sea near the Sea of Azov. As of the 2021 Russian census, it had a population of 81,863. It is one of the largest children's resorts in Russia.

In ancient times, Anapa was the site of a major seaport and a capital of the Sindi people. In the 6th century BC, it was settled by Greeks, who called it Gorgippia. In later centuries, the settlement came under the control of Genoa and then the Ottoman Empire. In 1781, a fortress was constructed there, which became the site of multiple sieges during the Russo-Turkish wars. It was finally annexed by the Russian Empire in 1829, after several occupations.

== History ==
=== Antiquity ===
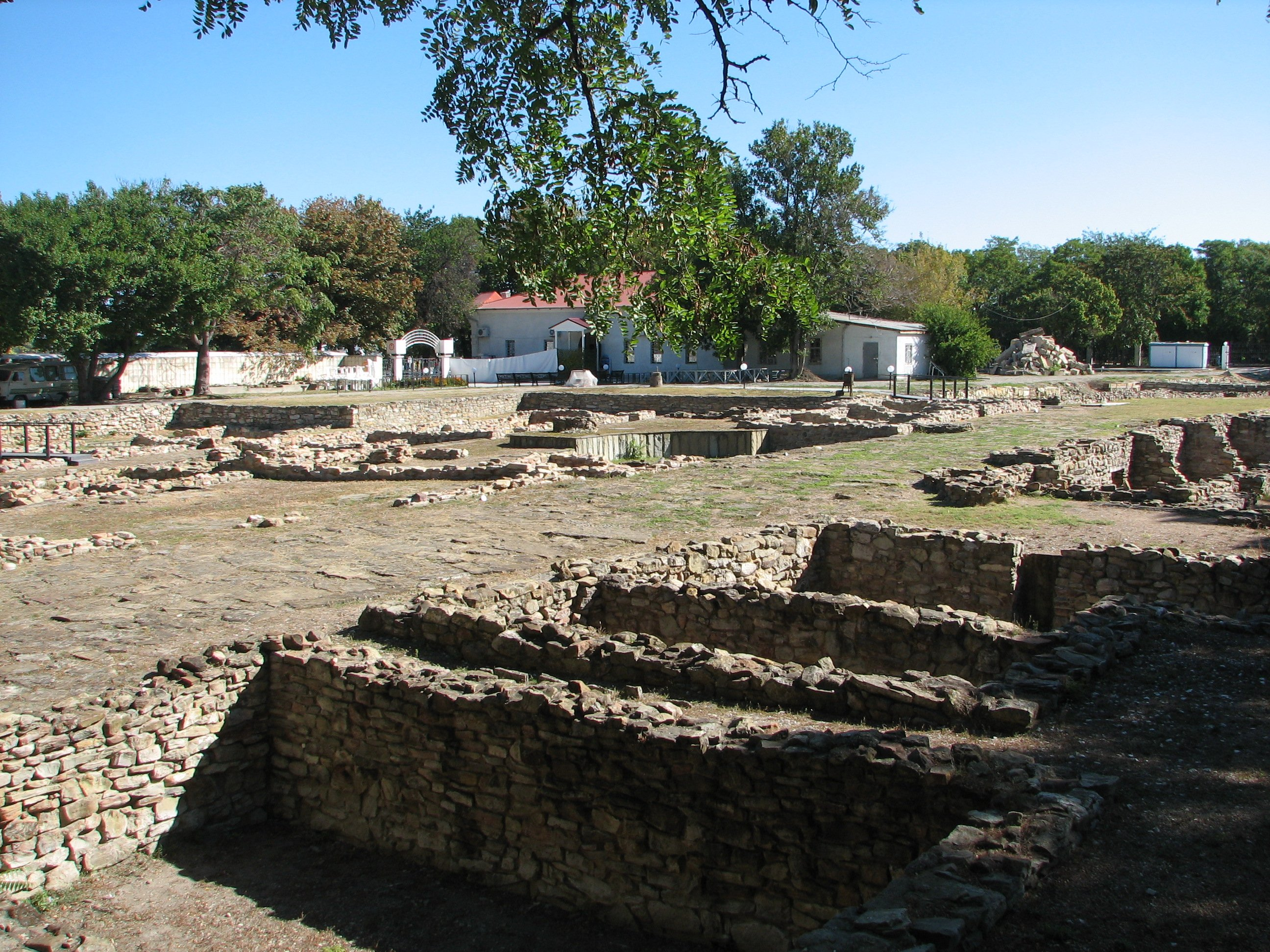
The archaeological site of Gorgippia

The area around Anapa was settled in antiquity. It was originally a major seaport (Sinda) and then the capital of Sindica. The colony of Gorgippia (Greek: Γοργιππία) was built on the site of Sinda in the 6th century BC by Pontic Greeks, who named it after a king of the Cimmerian Bosporus.

In the 2nd and 3rd centuries BC, Gorgippia flourished as part of the Bosporan Kingdom, as did its guild of shipowners, which controlled maritime trade in the eastern part of the Black Sea. A fine statue of Neokles (a local potentate, son of Herodoros) was unearthed by Russian archaeologists and is now on exhibit at the Russian Museum.

An inscription from the ancient city, dated to c. 60 AD, mentions individuals described as "Jews by race".

Gorgippia was inhabited until the 3rd century AD, when it was overrun by neighbouring native tribes. These tribes, of Circassian or Adyghe origin (specifically of the Natkhuay tribe), gave Anapa its modern name.

=== Middle Ages ===
Later the Black Sea littoral was overrun by successive waves of Asiatic nomads, including the Sarmatians, Ostrogoths, Huns, Avars, Gokturks, Khazars, Tatars and Circassians who are native to the Northwestern Caucasus. The settlement was renamed Mapa by the Genoese at the turn of the 14th century. Genoese domination lasted until the arrival of an Ottoman fleet in 1475.

=== Modern period ===
In 1781, during the reign of Abdul Hamid I, French engineers built a fortress at Anapa for the Ottomans.

The fortress was repeatedly attacked by the Russian Empire and was all but destroyed during its last siege in 1829. The town was passed to Russia after the Treaty of Adrianople (1829). See Russian conquest of the Caucasus § Black Sea Coast. It was included in Black Sea Okrug of Kuban Oblast and was granted town status in 1846.

It was occupied by Ottomans between 1853 and 1856 during the Crimean War. It became part of Black Sea Governorate in 1896. Elizabeth Pilenko, later named as a saint in the Eastern Orthodox Church, was the mayor during the Russian Revolution. It became part of Kuban-Black Sea Oblast in 1920, and then the North Caucasus Krai in 1924. According to the 1926 census, the population was 49.6% Russian, 32.7% Ukrainian, 5.7% Greek, and 3.9% Armenian.

During World War II, it was occupied and totally demolished by Nazi Germany with the help of Romanian troops between August 30, 1942 and September 22, 1943.

== Administrative and municipal status ==
Within the framework of administrative divisions, Anapa serves as the administrative center of Anapsky District, even though it is not a part of it. As an administrative division, it is, together with three rural localities, incorporated separately as the Town of Anapa—an administrative unit with the status equal to that of the districts. As a municipal division, the territories of the Town of Anapa and of Anapsky District are incorporated as Anapa Urban Okrug.

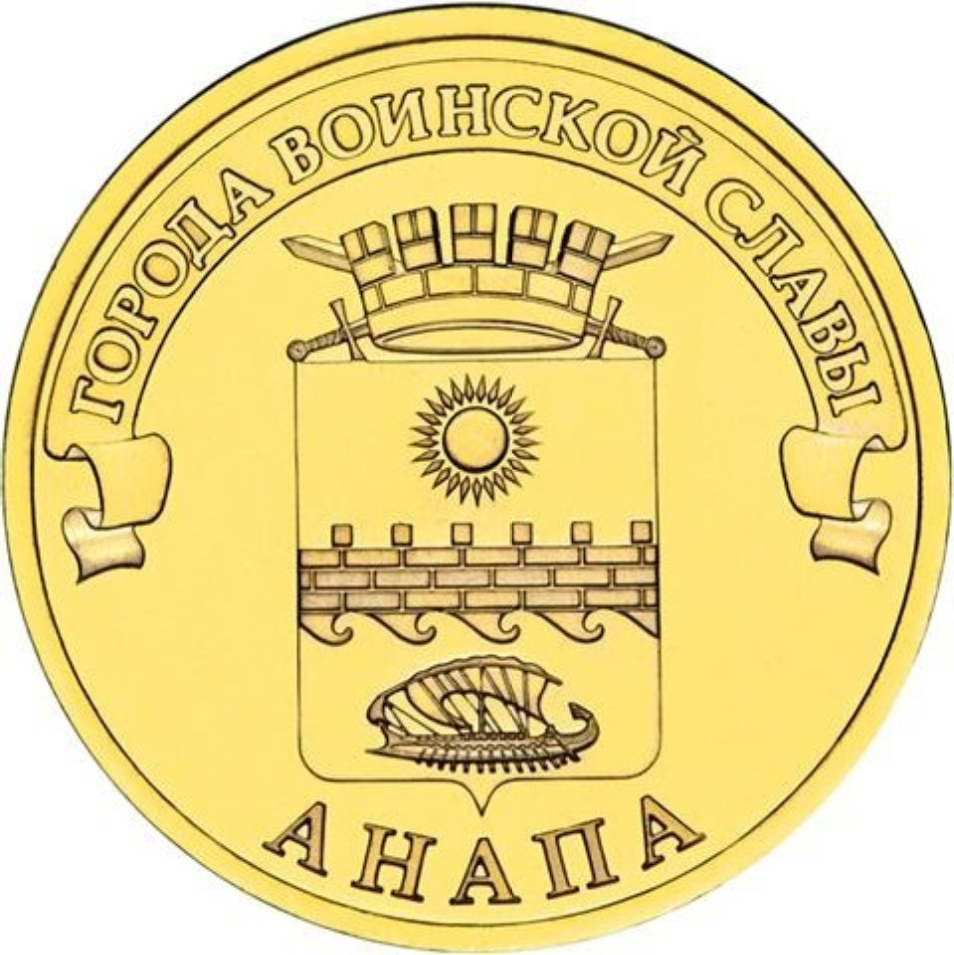
Commemorative coin of the Bank of Russia with a face of Anapa of 10 rubles (2014)

== Tourism ==
The town boasts a number of sanatoria and hotels. Anapa is served by the Anapa Airport. Anapa seldom attracts tourists from outside Russia due to its modest infrastructure and its inconvenient accessibility from Europe via Moscow or Krasnodar.

== Transportation ==
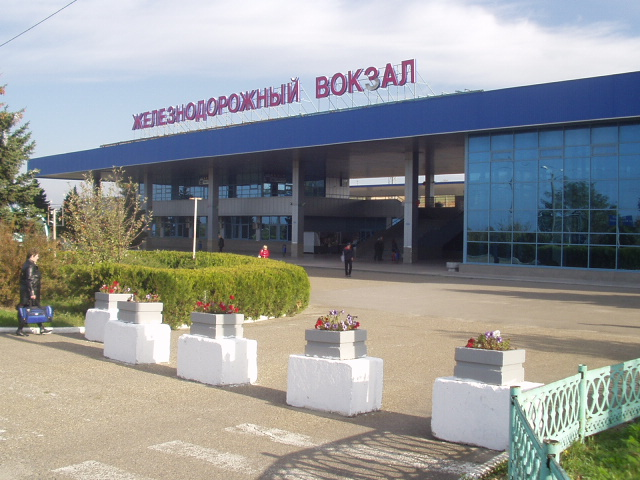
Train station in Anapa

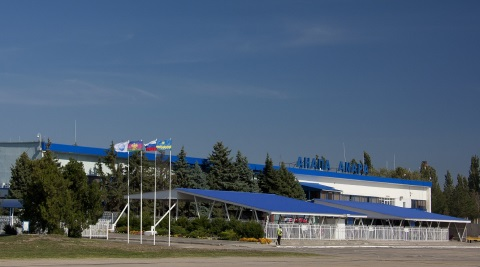
Anapa Airport

Transportation facilities include an international passenger port for small-tonnage ships, the Anapa Airport, a railway station, a bus station, and a network of highways.

== Climate ==
Anapa has a humid subtropical climate (Köppen climate classification Cfa) with mediterranean (Csa) influences at the lower elevations. Compared to cities further south along the coast like Novorossiysk and Sochi, Anapa receives considerably less rainfall but has somewhat colder winters.

Climate data for Anapa (1991–2020, extremes 1959–present)
Month	Jan	Feb	Mar	Apr	May	Jun	Jul	Aug	Sep	Oct	Nov	Dec	Year
Record high °C (°F)	17.9 (64.2)	21.0 (69.8)	24.9 (76.8)	29.2 (84.6)	31.1 (88.0)	36.3 (97.3)	39.9 (103.8)	38.5 (101.3)	34.9 (94.8)	35.6 (96.1)	27.1 (80.8)	22.3 (72.1)	39.9 (103.8)
Mean daily maximum °C (°F)	6.2 (43.2)	6.7 (44.1)	9.8 (49.6)	15.0 (59.0)	20.1 (68.2)	25.2 (77.4)	28.7 (83.7)	29.2 (84.6)	23.9 (75.0)	18.1 (64.6)	12.1 (53.8)	8.1 (46.6)	16.9 (62.5)
Daily mean °C (°F)	2.9 (37.2)	3.2 (37.8)	6.4 (43.5)	11.0 (51.8)	16.2 (61.2)	21.3 (70.3)	24.4 (75.9)	24.5 (76.1)	19.5 (67.1)	14.0 (57.2)	8.3 (46.9)	4.8 (40.6)	13.0 (55.5)
Mean daily minimum °C (°F)	0.2 (32.4)	0.4 (32.7)	3.6 (38.5)	7.9 (46.2)	13.1 (55.6)	17.9 (64.2)	20.3 (68.5)	20.1 (68.2)	15.2 (59.4)	10.4 (50.7)	5.2 (41.4)	2.0 (35.6)	9.7 (49.4)
Record low °C (°F)	−23.9 (−11.0)	−20.0 (−4.0)	−13.2 (8.2)	−5.1 (22.8)	0.7 (33.3)	7.6 (45.7)	11.1 (52.0)	8.5 (47.3)	2.0 (35.6)	−6.3 (20.7)	−12.2 (10.0)	−18.9 (−2.0)	−23.9 (−11.0)
Average precipitation mm (inches)	60 (2.4)	47 (1.9)	51 (2.0)	38 (1.5)	40 (1.6)	41 (1.6)	34 (1.3)	34 (1.3)	55 (2.2)	53 (2.1)	50 (2.0)	62 (2.4)	565 (22.3)
Average rainy days	13	12	13	13	11	9	7	6	9	10	13	14	130
Average snowy days	6	6	4	0.2	0	0	0	0	0	0.2	2	5	23
Average relative humidity (%)	81	78	77	77	77	78	71	69	72	75	79	81	76
Mean monthly sunshine hours	72.9	97.1	148.8	191.0	272.3	310.1	339.9	319.1	251.7	191.5	102.9	58.6	2,355.9
Source 1: Pogoda.ru.net
Source 2: Weatherbase (sunshine hours)

Average Sea Temperature (1977-2006).
Month	Jan	Feb	Mar	Apr	May	Jun	Jul	Aug	Sep	Oct	Nov	Dec
Average temperature	6.8 °C	6.1 °C	7.4 °C	10.6 °C	15.1 °C	20.0 °C	23.1 °C	24.1 °C	21.1 °C	16.6 °C	11.9 °C	8.7 °C

== Demographics ==
The population of Anapa according to recent censuses is as follows: 81,863 (2021 census); 58,990 (2010 census); 53,493 (2002 census); 54,796 (1989 Soviet census).

== Culture ==
The Town Theater of Anapa is located on Krymskaya Street. It was opened after the reconstruction of the Town Cultural Center. There are twenty-nine public libraries, including four for children. In 2010 the libraries of Anapa received more than 8,000 books, and magazines and newspapers were ordered costing more than 1,000,000 rubles; in addition, nine hundred CDs were purchased.

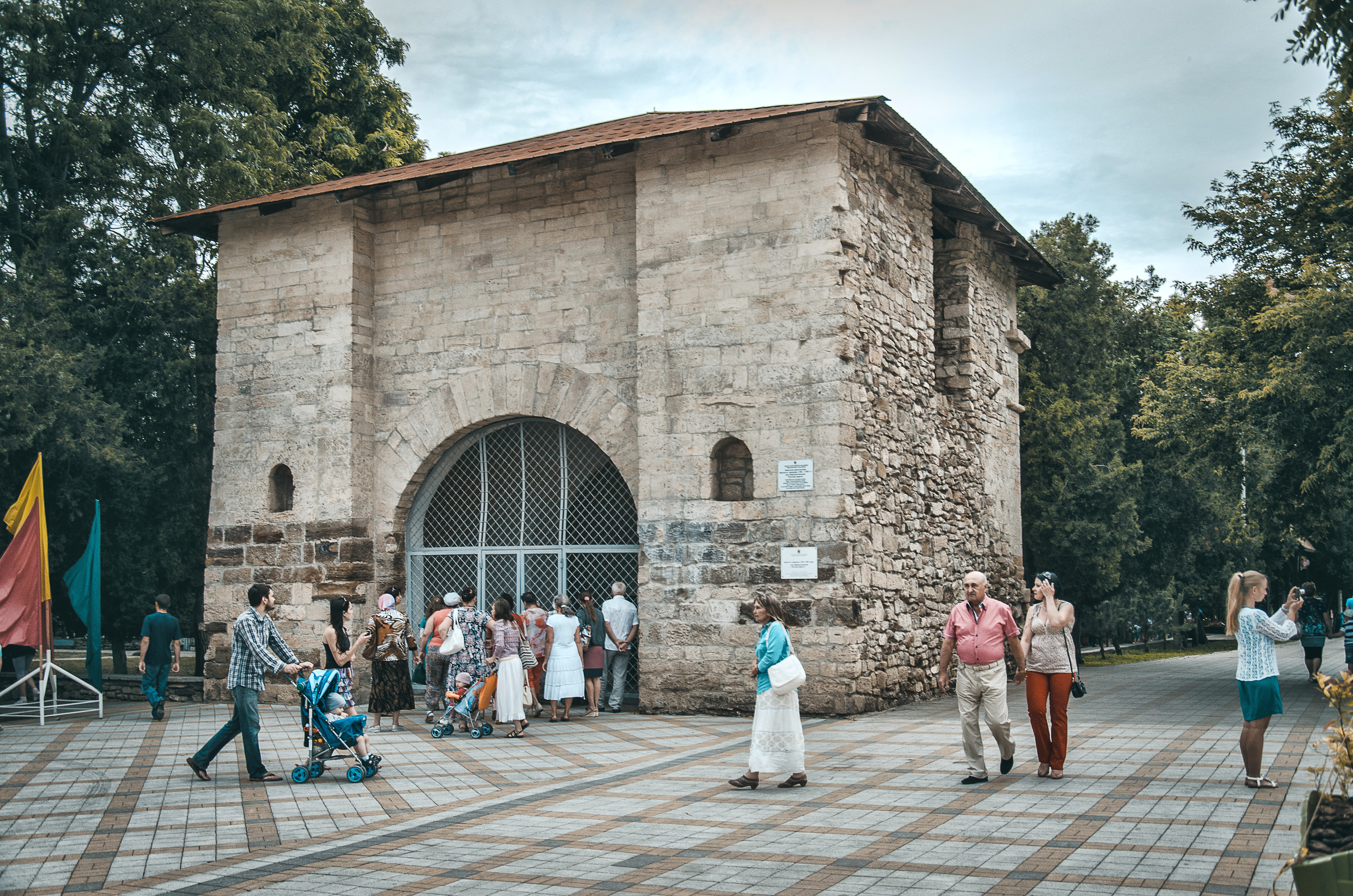
The only remaining gates of an Ottoman fort

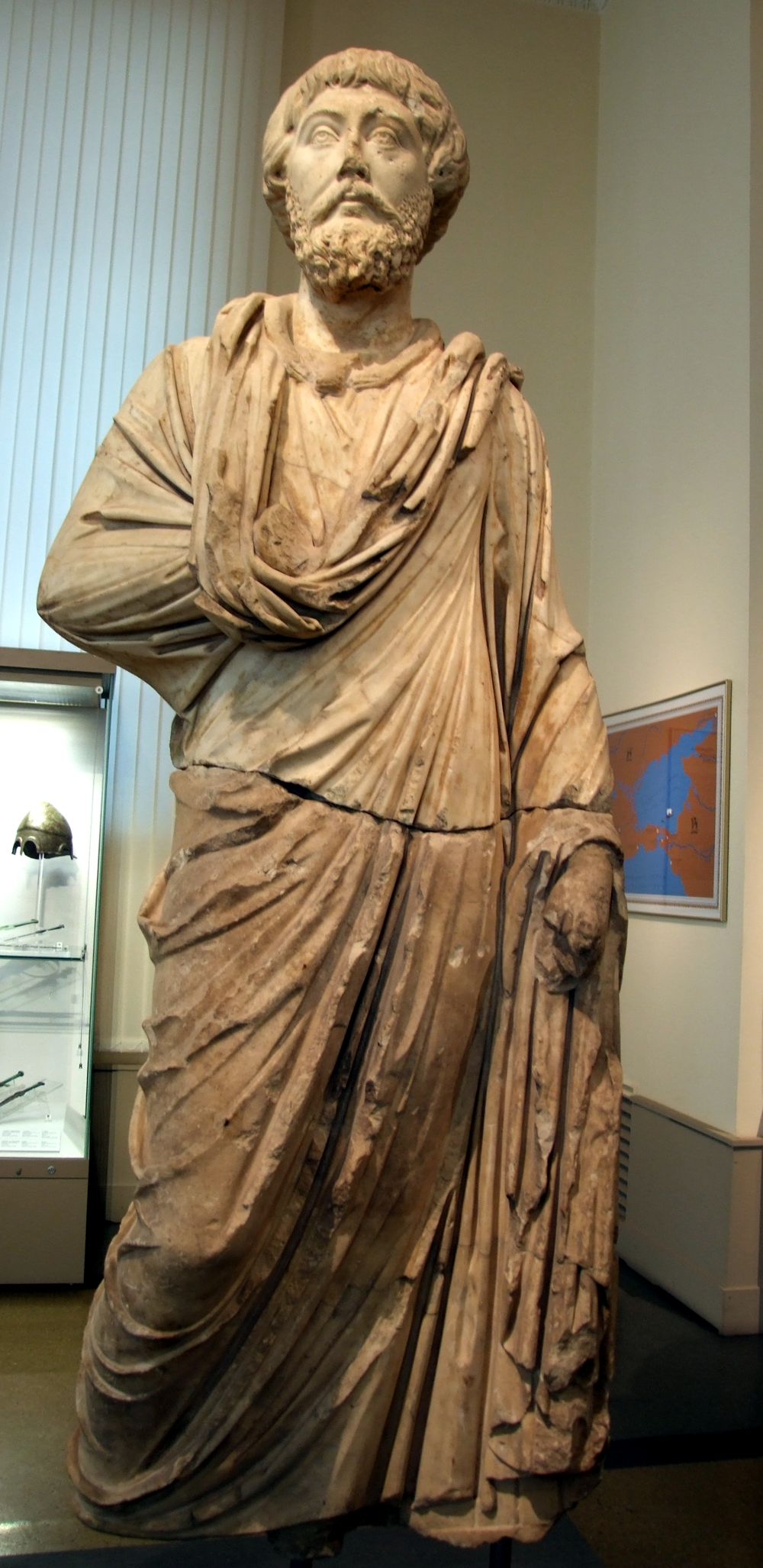
Anonymous ruler of the city of Gorgippia (Anapa) in the Bosporan Kingdom, c. 180 AD, during the period of Roman Crimea. Or alternatively the Roman Emperor at that time, Marcus Aurelius.

There is museum of Local History (Краеведческий музей) on Protapova Street.

=== Architecture and sights ===
- The Gorgippia Archeological museum
- Gates of Turkish fortress
- Church of St. Onuphrius
- Lighthouse
- Wildlife preserve of Bolshoy Utrish south of Sukko

== List of mayors ==
- Maria Skobtsova
- Valentin Mashukov
- Germogen Korolyov
- Mikhail Boyur
- Vitaly Astapenko
- Vladimir Tsukanov
- Anatoly Pakhomov
- Tatyana Yevsikova

== Activities carried out in the town ==
- Kinoshock Film Festival
- Blue-eyed Anapa song Festival
- Russian coast guard academy

== Twin towns and sister cities ==
Anapa is twinned with:

- Gomel, Belarus
- Novy Urengoy, Russia
- Larissa, Greece

== Gallery ==
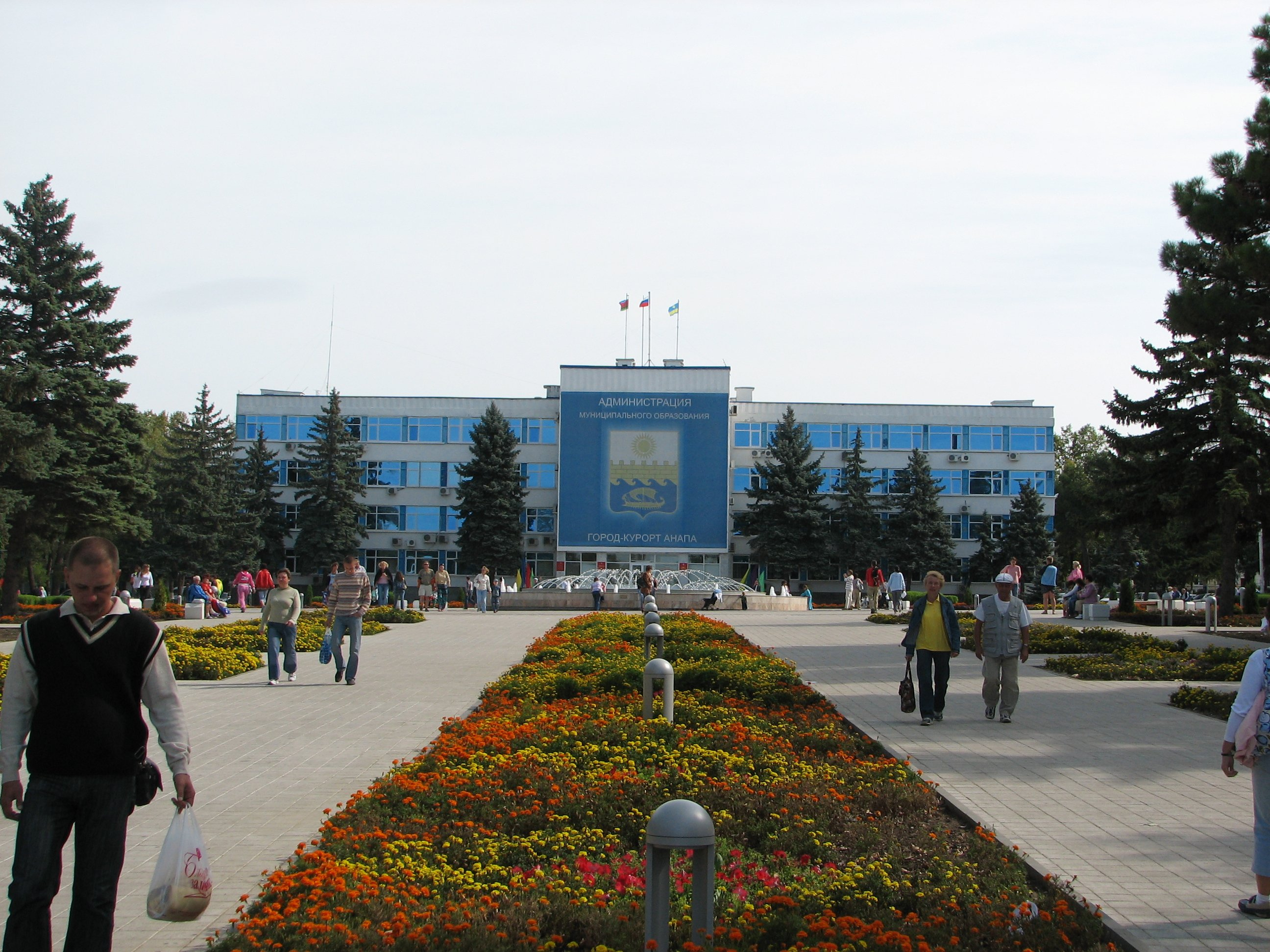
Administration building

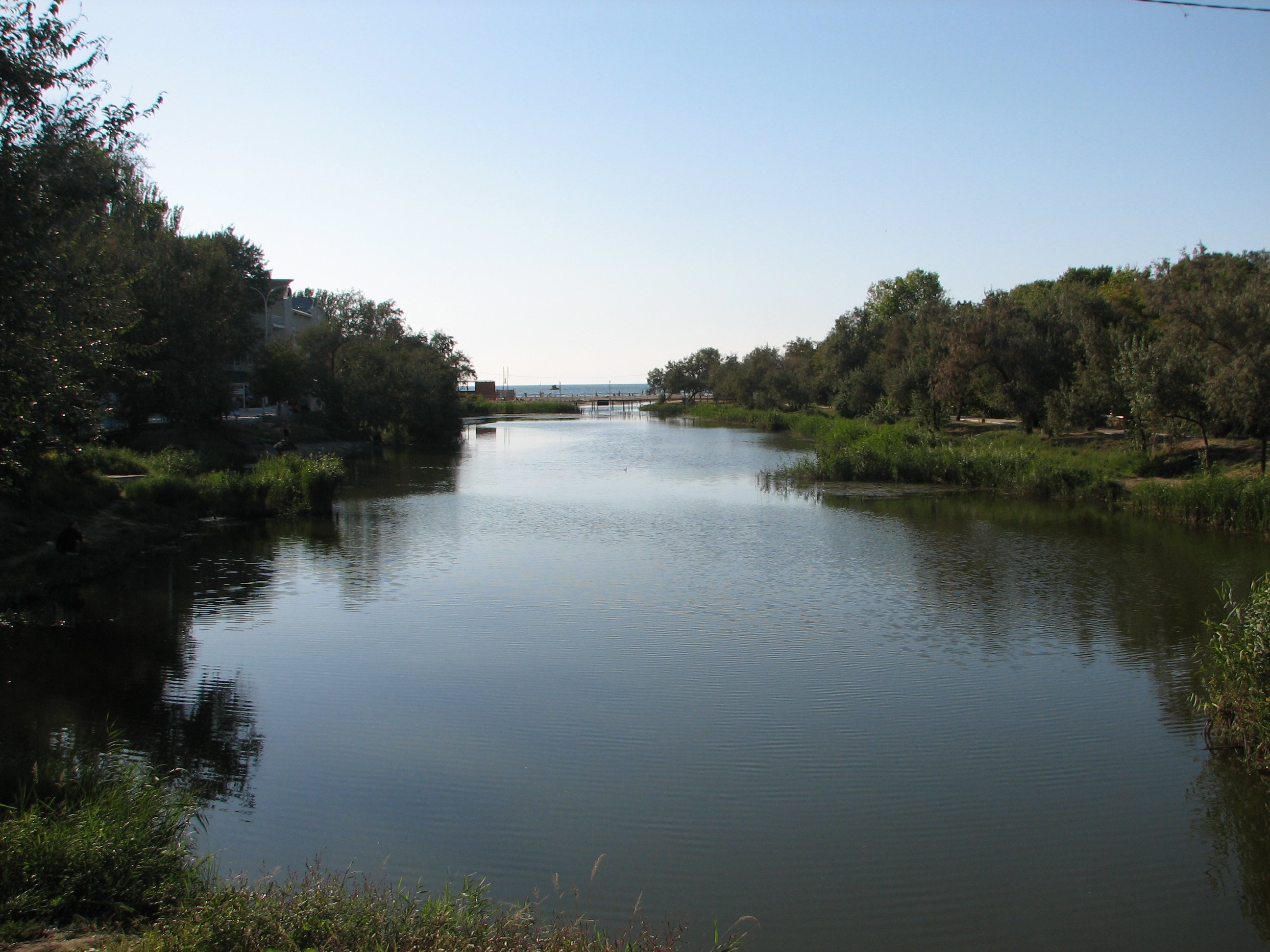
Anapa river

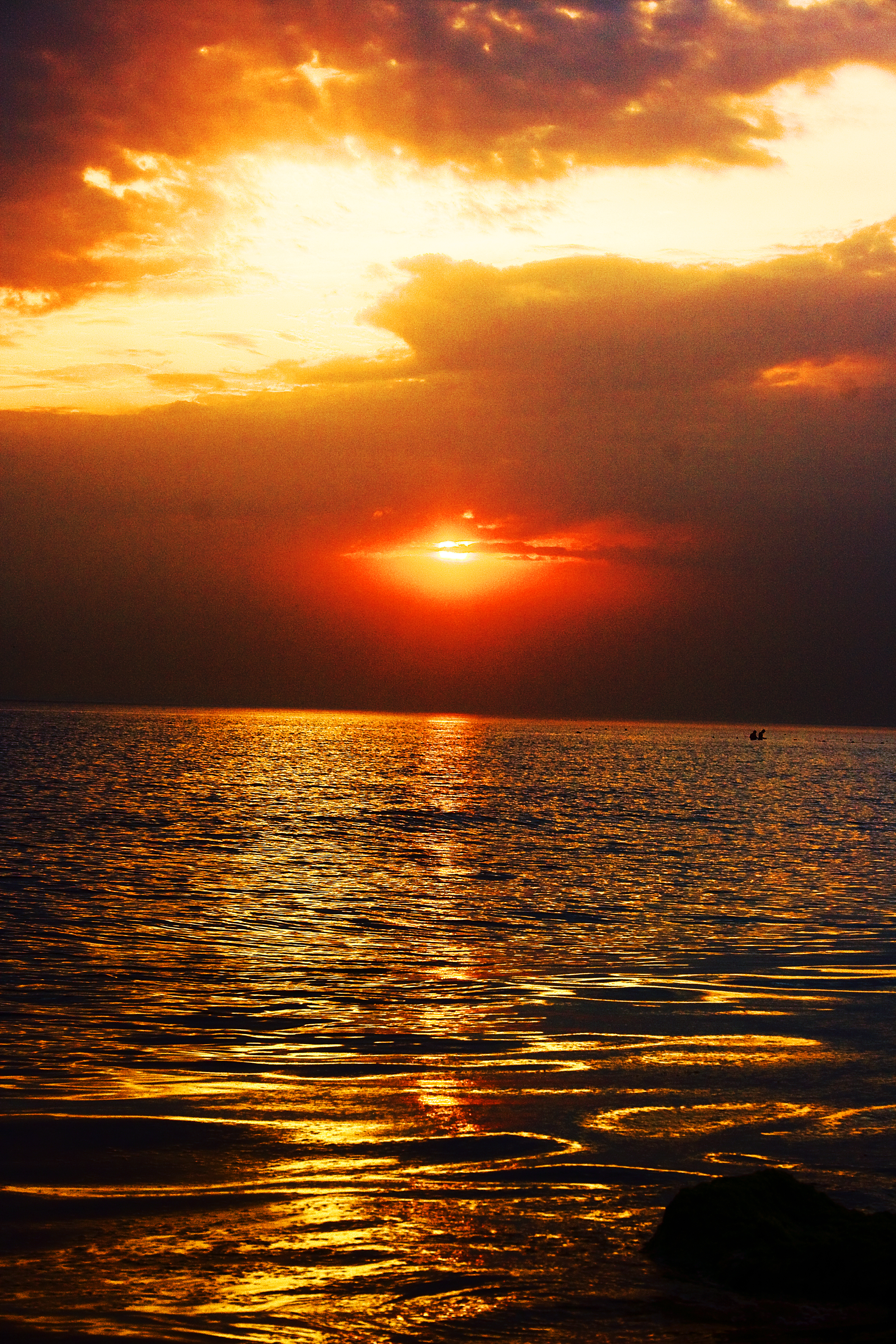
The sea in Anapa

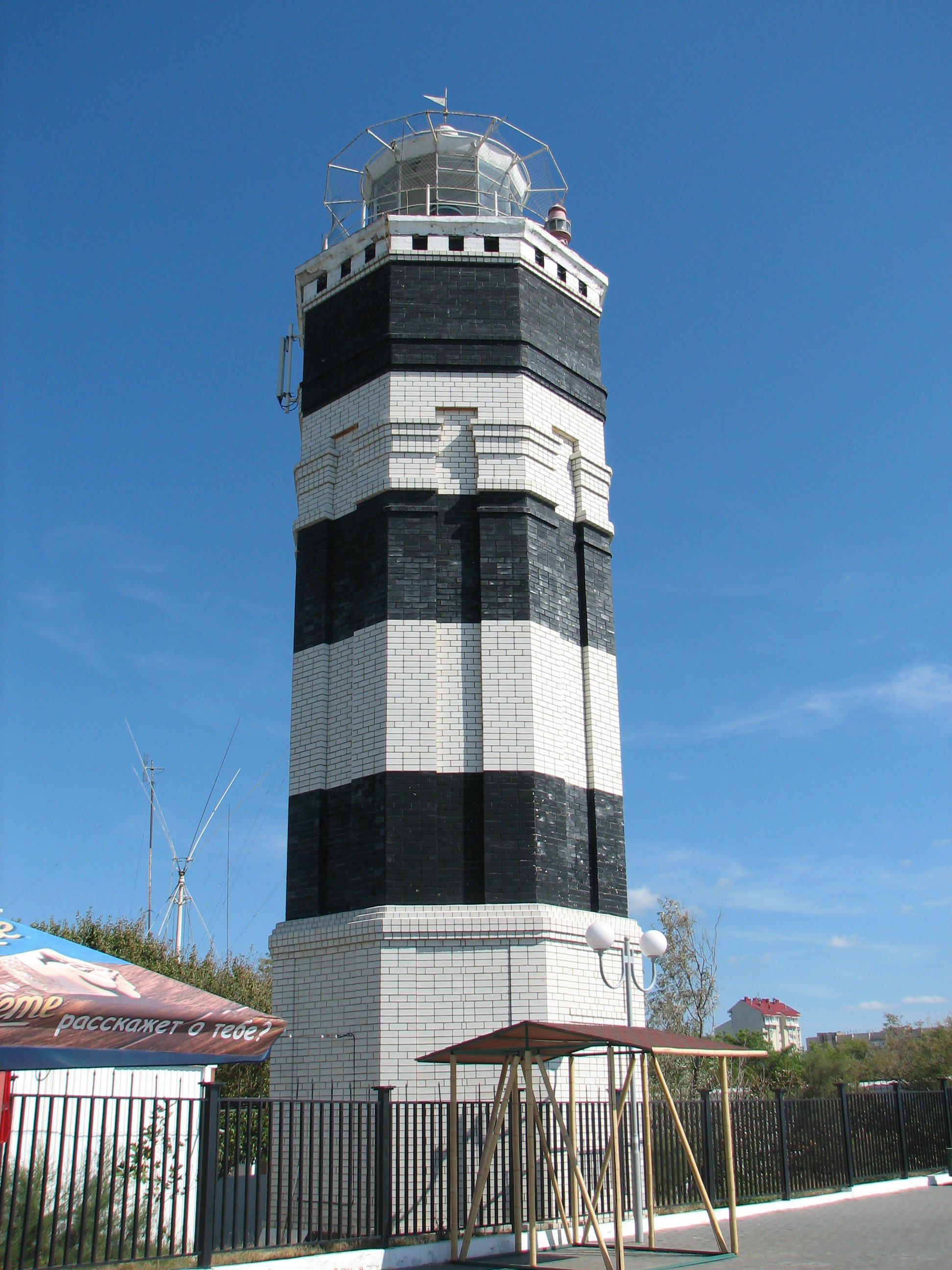
Lighthouse

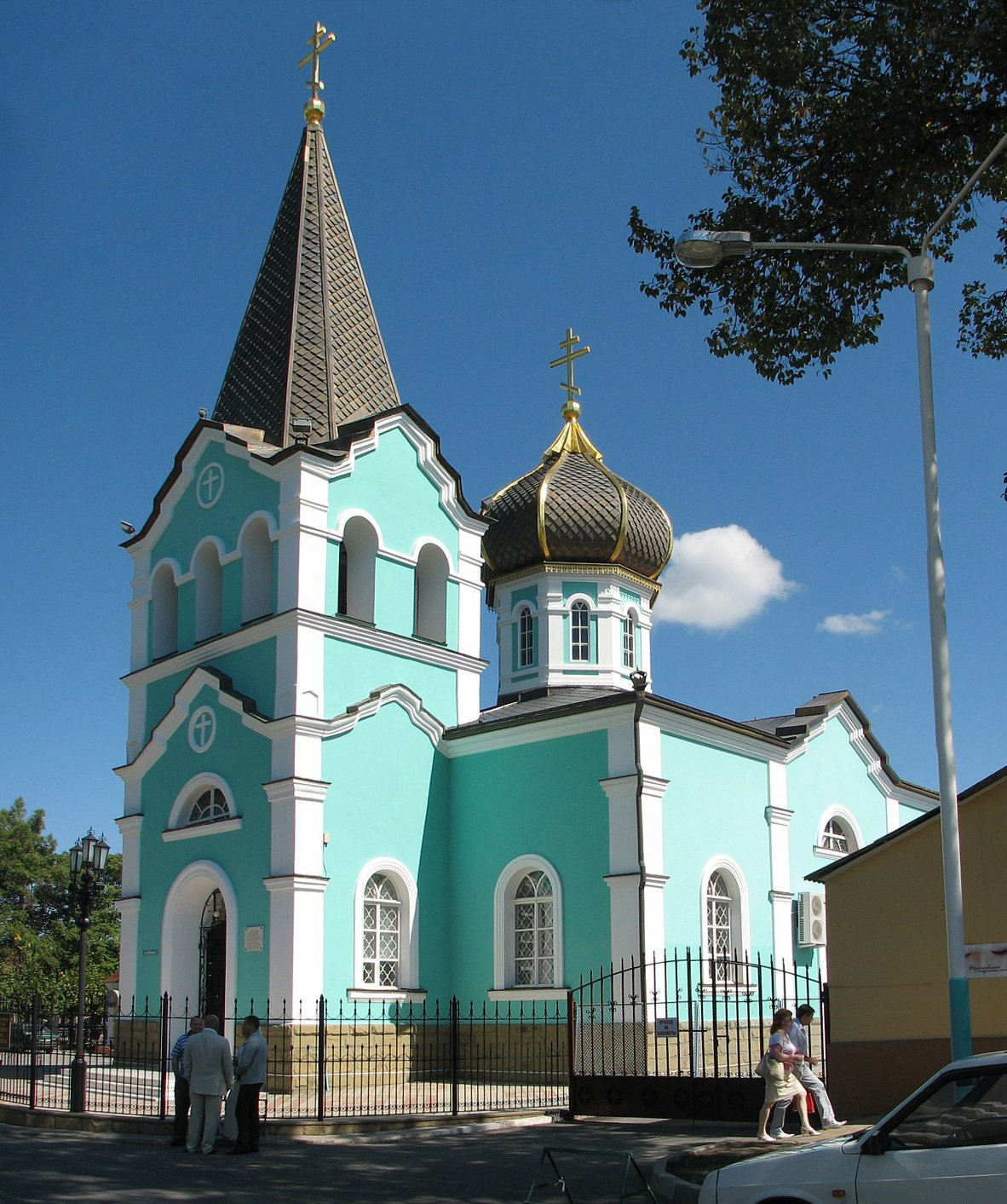
temple of Saint Onuphrius the Great

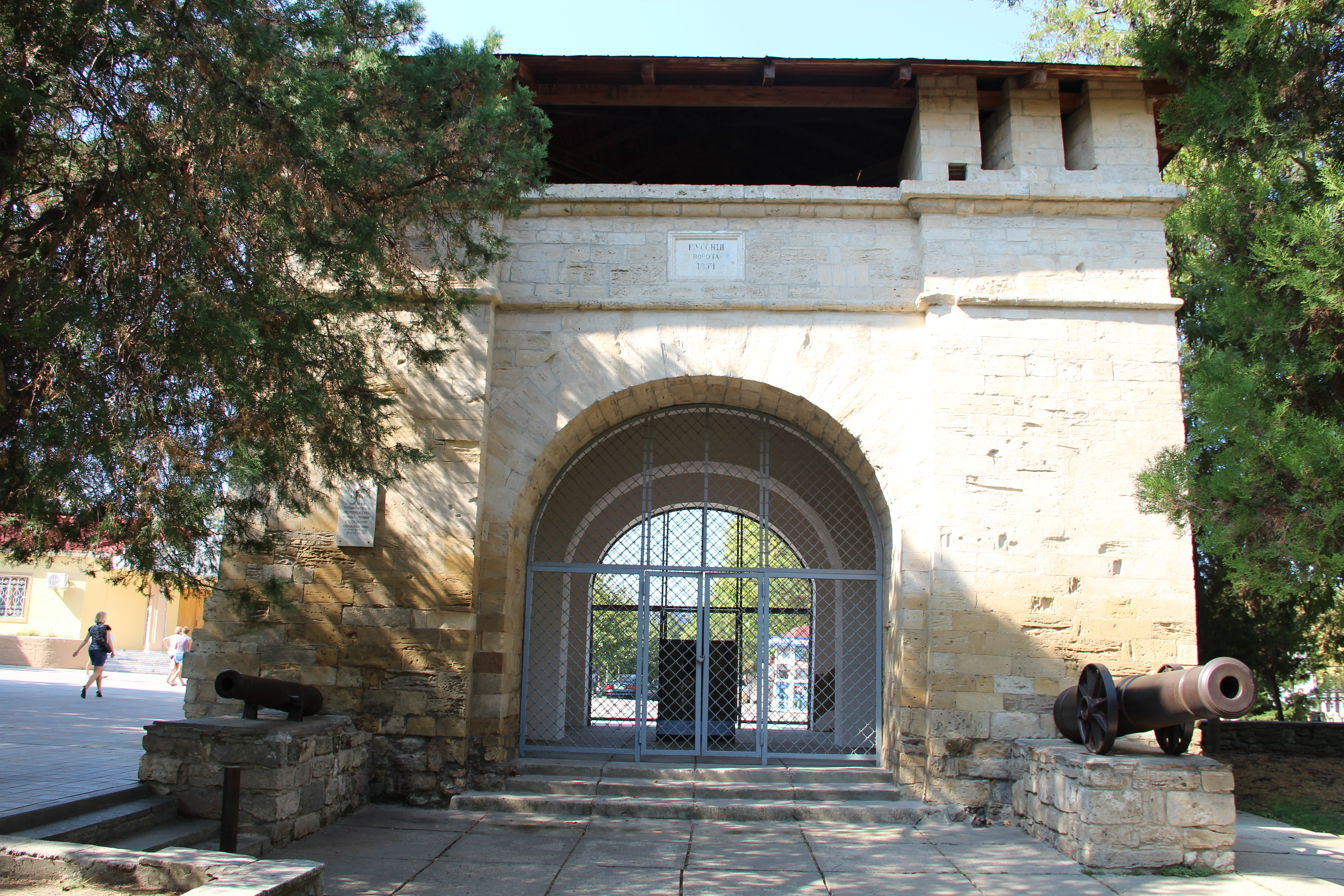
The only remaining gates of an Ottoman fort

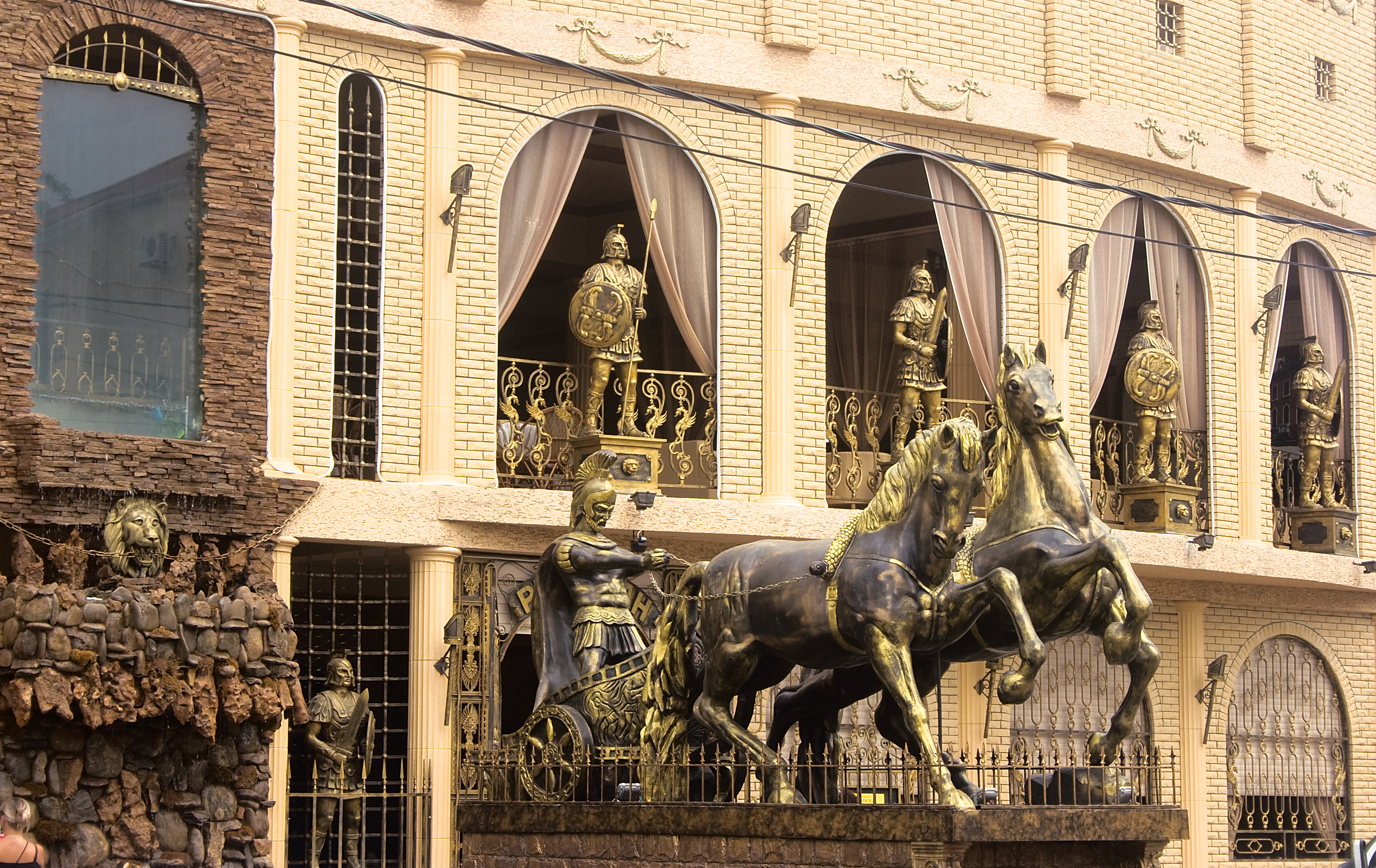
Equestrian statue in Gemete restaurant of the Colosseum

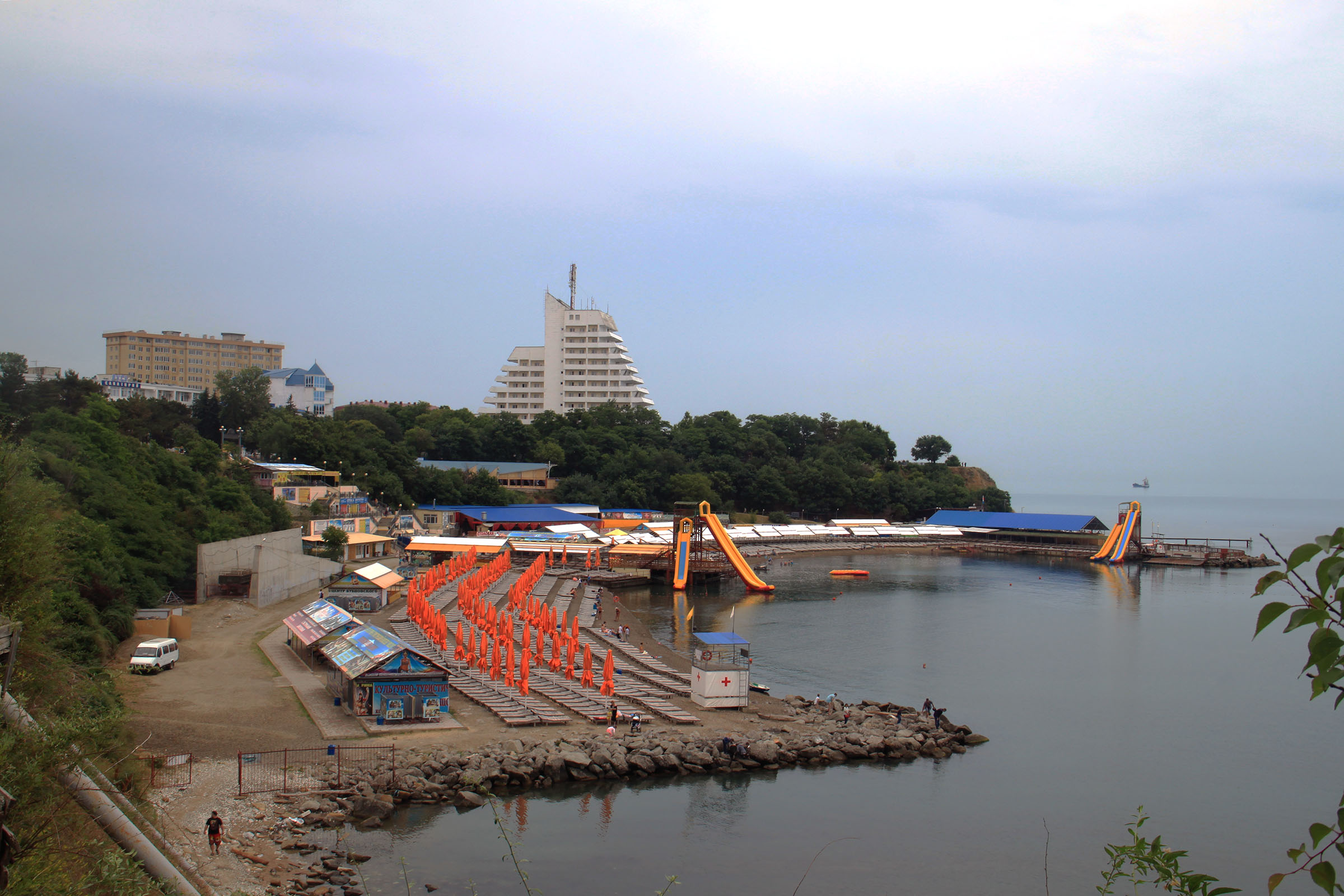
Beach in the Little Bay

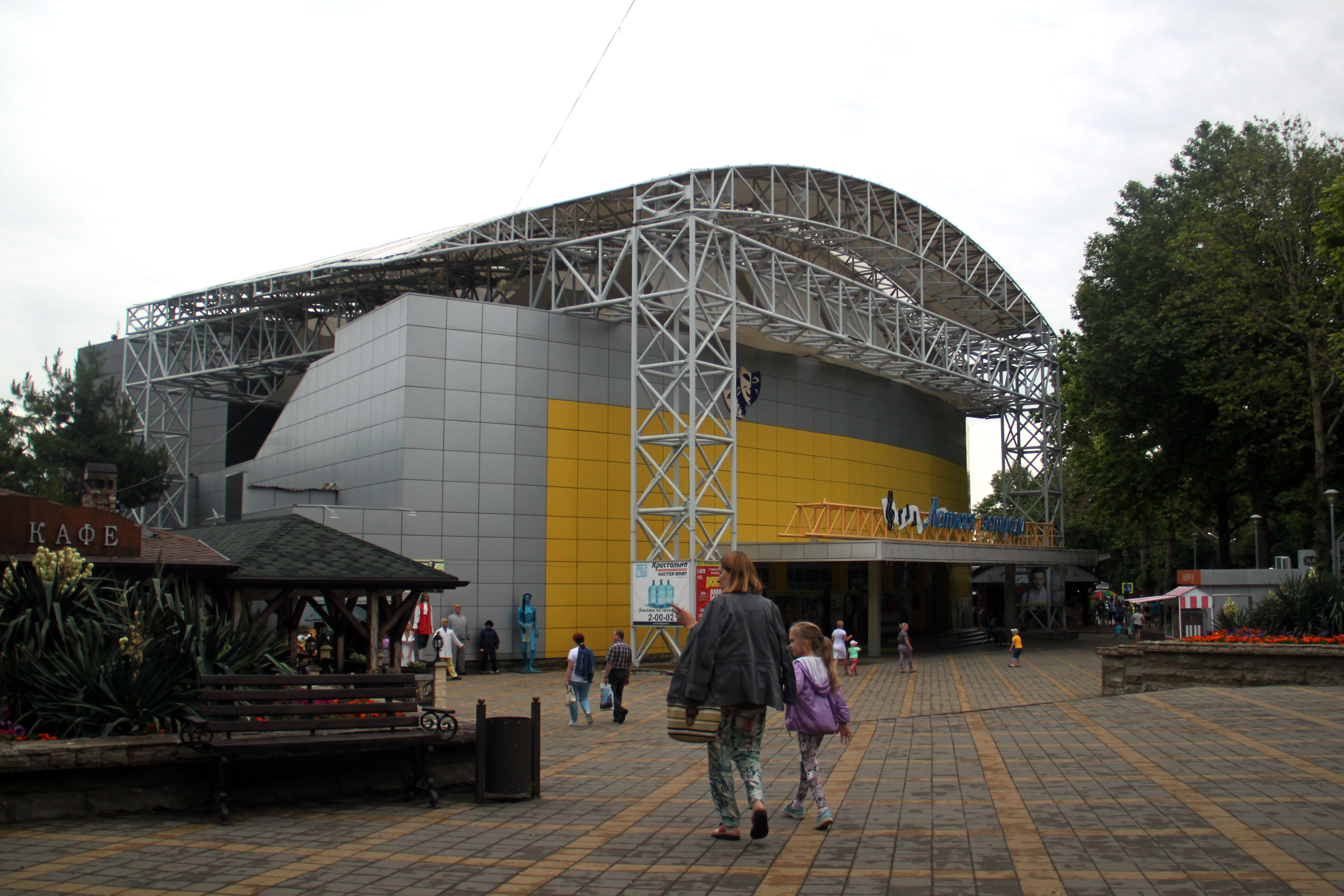
Concert platform "Summer Estrada"

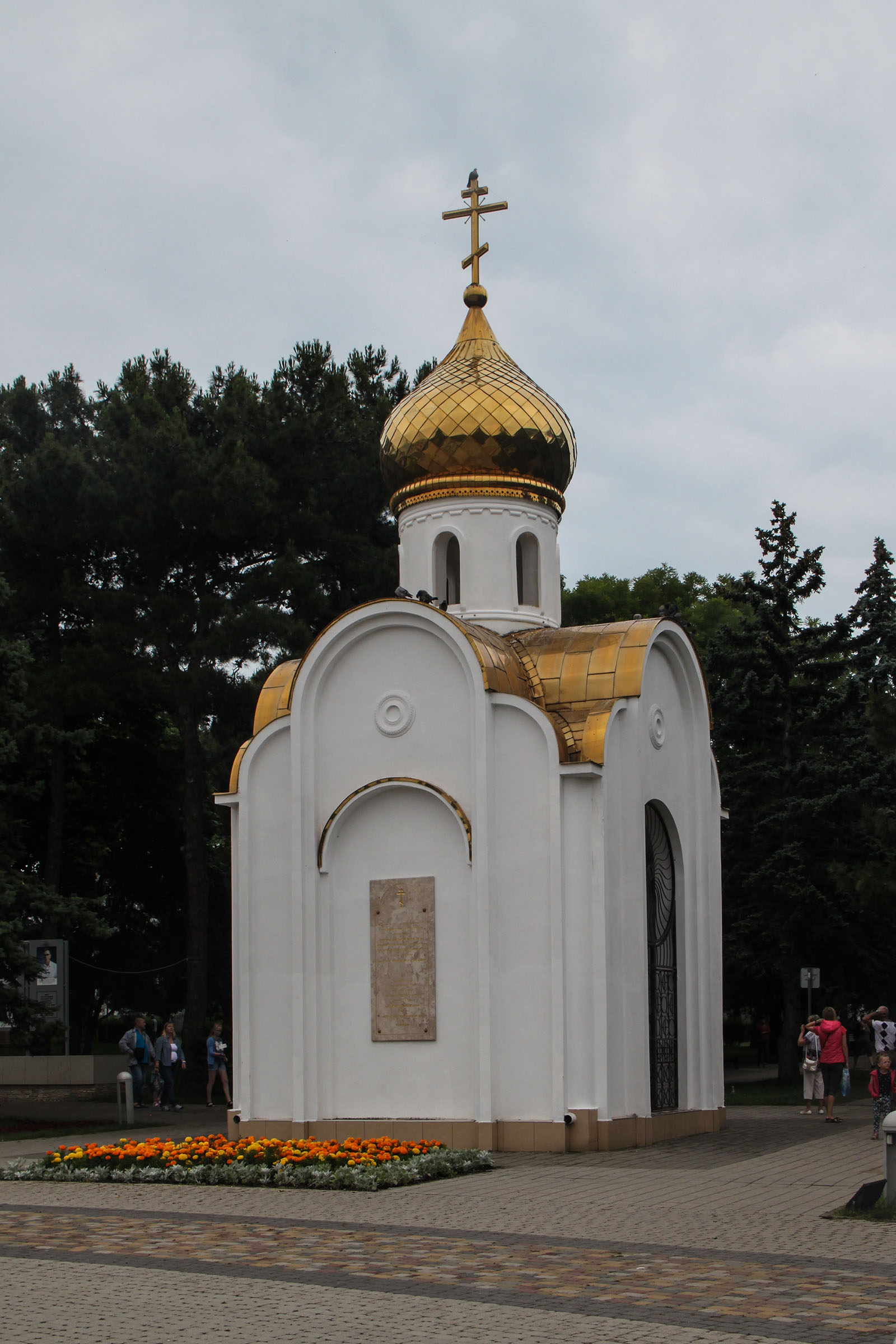
Chapel of the Prophet Hosea
