= Anapsky District =

Anapsky District Анапский район (Russian)
- District
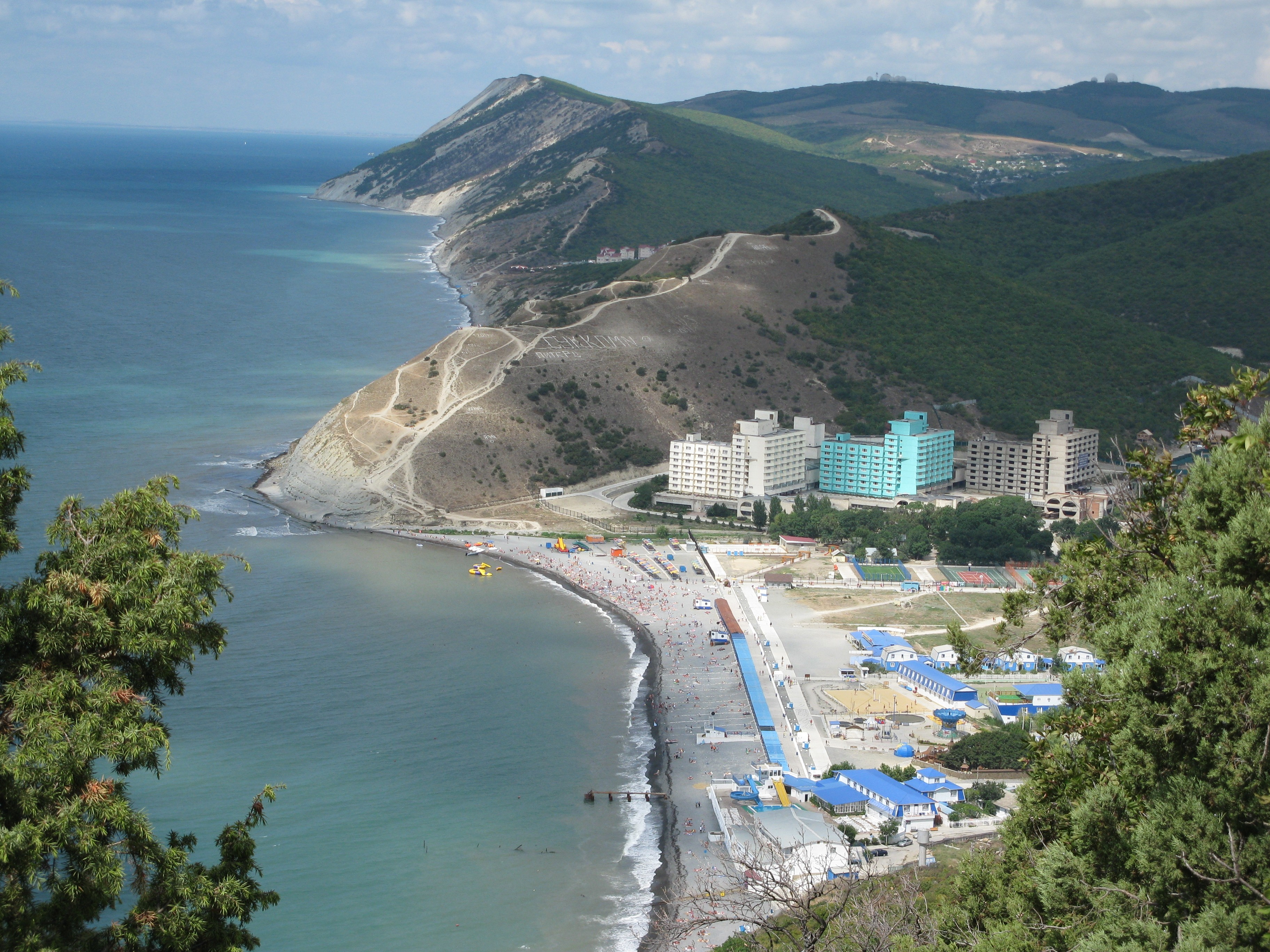
- Beach in Anapsky District

- Flag Coat of arms
- Location of Anapsky District in Krasnodar Krai
- Coordinates: 40°N 40°E
- Country: Russia
- Federal subject: Krasnodar Krai
- Established: 1923
- Administrative center: Anapa

Population (2010 Census)
  - Total: 76,904
  - Urban: 0%
  - Rural: 100%

Administrative structure
  - Administrative divisions: 8 Rural okrugs
  - Inhabited localities: 48 rural localities

Municipal structure
  - Municipally incorporated as: Anapa Urban Okrug

Anapsky District (Russian: Ана́пский райо́н) is an administrative district (raion), one of the thirty-eight in Krasnodar Krai, Russia. It is located in the west of the krai. Its administrative center is the town of Anapa (which is not a part of the administrative district). Population: 76,904 (2010 census); 69,134 (2002 census); 57,281 (1989 Soviet census).

== Administrative and municipal status ==
Within the framework of administrative divisions, Anapsky District is one of the thirty-eight in the krai. The town of Anapa serves as its administrative center, despite being incorporated separately as an administrative unit with the status equal to that of the districts.

As a municipal division, the territory of the administrative district and the territory of the Town of Anapa are incorporated together as Anapa Urban Okrug.
