= Northern constituency (Krasnodar Krai) =

Legislative constituency in Russia

Northern single-member constituency
- Constituency of the Russian State Duma
- Deputy: Dmitry Lotsmanov; United Russia
- Federal subject: Krasnodar Krai
- Districts: Bryukhovetsky, Kanevskoy, Krylovsky, Kushchyovsky, Leningradsky, Novopokrovsky (Gorkaya Balka, Kalnibolotskaya, Nezamayevsky, Novoivanovskaya) Pavlovsky, Shcherbinovsky, Starominsky, Yeysky
- Voters: 442,323 (2026)

The Northern constituency (No.57 (Note: Kanevskaya constituency No.40 in 1993-1995, Kanevskaya constituency No.39 in 1995-2003, Kanevskaya constituency No.42 in 2003-2007, Kanevskaya constituency No.53 in 2016–2026)) is a Russian legislative constituency in Krasnodar Krai. The constituency covers predominantly rural northern Krasnodar Krai.

The constituency has been represented since 2021 by United Russia deputy Dmitry Lotsmanov, an agricultural businessman, who won the open seat, succeeding one-term United Russia incumbent Natalya Boyeva.

== Boundaries ==
1993–2003 Kanevskaya constituency: Bryukhovetsky District, Kanevskoy District, Krylovsky District, Kushchyovsky District, Leningradsky District, Primorsko-Akhtarsky District, Shcherbinovsky District, Starominsky District, Timashevsky District, Yeysk, Yeysky District
The constituency covered heavy agricultural rural northern Krasnodar Krai, including the town of Yeysk on the Azov Sea coast.

2003–2007 Kanevskaya constituency: Kanevskoy District, Krylovsky District, Kushchyovsky District, Leningradsky District, Pavlovsky District, Primorsko-Akhtarsky District, Shcherbinovsky District, Starominsky District, Yeysk, Yeysky District
After 2003 redistricting the constituency was slightly changed, losing Bryukhovetsky and Timashevsky districts to Dinskaya constituency. This seat instead gained Pavlovsky District from Tikhoretsk constituency.

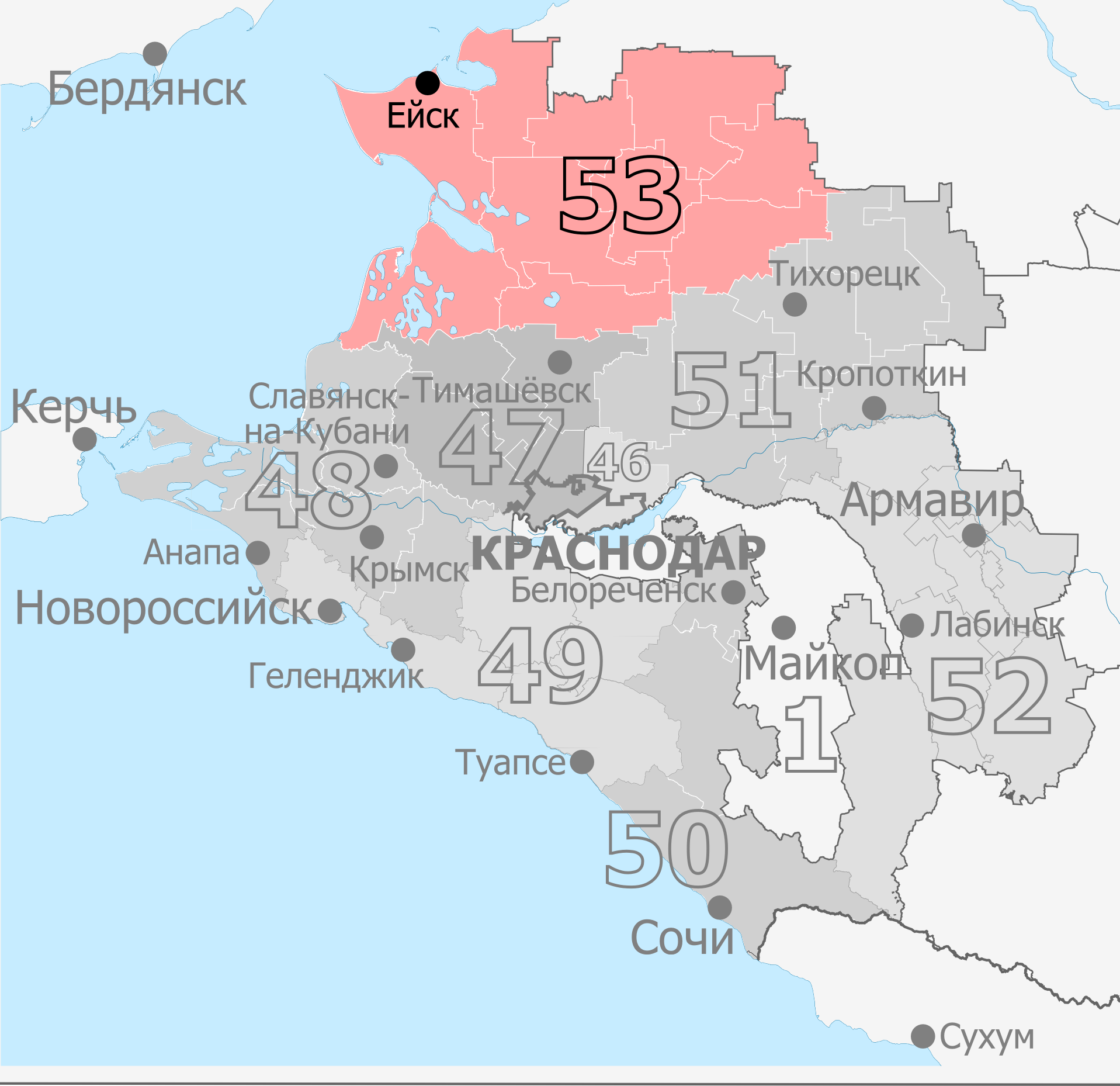
Constituency boundaries from 2016 to 2026

2016–2026 Kanevskaya constituency: Bryukhovetsky District, Kanevskoy District, Krylovsky District, Kushchyovsky District, Leningradsky District, Pavlovsky District, Primorsko-Akhtarsky District, Shcherbinovsky District, Starominsky District, Yeysky District
The constituency was re-created for the 2016 election. This seat regained Bryukhovetsky District from the former Dinskaya constituency.

2026–present: Bryukhovetsky District, Kanevskoy District, Krylovsky District, Kushchyovsky District, Leningradsky District, Novopokrovsky District (Gorkaya Balka, Kalnibolotskaya, Nezamayevsky, Novoivanovskaya), Pavlovsky District, Shcherbinovsky District, Starominsky District, Yeysky District
The constituency was slightly altered after the 2025 redistricting, once again losing Primorsko-Akhtarsky District to North-Western constituency. This seat gained northern half of Novopokrovsky District from the former Tikhoretsk constituency and was renamed "Northern constituency".

== Members elected ==
Election	Member	Party
1993	Anatoly Kochegura	Independent
1995	Aleksandr Petrik (Note: died in April 1998)	Communist Party
1998	Aleksandr Burulko	Communist Party
1999	Aleksandr Burulko	Communist Party
2003	Galina Doroshenko	Independent
2007	Proportional representation - no election by constituency	
2011	Proportional representation - no election by constituency	
2016	Natalya Boyeva	United Russia
2021	Dmitry Lotsmanov	United Russia
2026	Dmitry Lotsmanov	United Russia

== Election results ==
=== 1993 ===
==== Declared candidates ====
- Anatoly Barykin (CPRF), philosophy senior lecturer, political scientist
- Anatoly Kochegura (Independent), kolkhoz chairman
- Vasily Komlatsky (Choice of Russia), Kuban State Agrarian University department of pig breeding head
- Aleksandr Petrik (Independent), former People's Deputy of Russia (1990–1993)

==== Results ====
Summary of the 12 December 1993 Russian legislative election in the Kanevskaya constituency
Candidate	Party	Votes	%
Anatoly Kochegura	Independent	115,665	40.23%
Anatoly Barykin	Communist Party	–	–
Vasily Komlatsky	Choice of Russia	–	–
Aleksandr Petrik	Independent	–	–
Total		287,499	100%

=== 1995 ===
==== Declared candidates ====
- Anatoly Borzilov (APR), Member of Legislative Assembly of Krasnodar Krai (1994–present), agribusinessman
- Aleksandr But (Independent), farmer
- Vladimir Istomin (DVR–OD), journalist
- Anatoly Kochegura (Independent), incumbent Member of State Duma (1994–present)
- Galina Kuznetsova (Independent), Head of the Pension Fund regional office (1991–present)
- Vladimir Lisichkin (LDPR), Member of State Duma (1994–present)
- Vladimir Maystrenko (Independent), Mayor of Timashevsk (1993–present)
- Aleksey Melnik (NDR), kolkhoz chairman, Hero of Socialist Labour (1984)
- Aleksandr Petrik (CPRF), Member of Legislative Assembly of Krasnodar Krai (1994–present), former People's Deputy of Russia (1990–1993), 1993 candidate for this seat
- Anatoly Soldatov (Independent), agribusinessman
- Valentin Tishchenko (Independent), armored repair plant commander

==== Results ====
Summary of the 17 December 1995 Russian legislative election in the Kanevskaya constituency
Candidate	Party	Votes	%
Aleksandr Petrik	Communist Party	96,553	27.99%
Vladimir Lisichkin	Liberal Democratic Party	49,801	14.44%
Valentin Tishchenko	Independent	29,746	8.62%
Galina Kuznetsova	Independent	28,867	8.37%
Anatoly Kochegura (incumbent)	Independent	26,997	7.83%
Aleksey Melnik	Our Home – Russia	20,102	5.83%
Anatoly Soldatov	Independent	17,474	5.07%
Anatoly Borzilov	Agrarian Party	16,731	4.85%
Vladimir Istomin	Democratic Choice of Russia – United Democrats	14,079	4.08%
Vladimir Maystrenko	Independent	12,648	3.67%
Aleksandr But	Independent	7,714	2.24%
against all		19,054	5.52%
Total		344,915	100%

=== 1998 ===
==== Declared candidates ====
- Aleksandr Burulko (CPRF), brick factory director
- Oleg Krutov (Independent), businessman
- Nikolay Kryazhevskikh (Independent), Deputy Premier of Krasnodar Krai (1997–present)
- Vladimir Lisichkin (Independent), Member of State Duma (1994–present), 1995 candidate for this seat
- Vladimir Morozov (Independent), nonprofit president
- Lev Ubozhko (Independent), chairman of the Conservative Party of Russia (1990–present), perennial candidate
- Viktoria Ziborova (Independent), businesswoman

==== Results ====
Summary of the 22 November 1998 by-election in the Kanevskaya constituency
Candidate	Party	Votes	%
Aleksandr Burulko	Communist Party	76,337	32.96%
Nikolay Kryazhevskikh	Independent	59,823	25.83%
Viktoria Ziborova	Independent	29,145	12.58%
Vladimir Lisichkin	Independent	19,972	8.62%
Vladimir Morozov	Independent	11,519	4.97%
Oleg Krutov	Independent	5,200	2.24%
Lev Ubozhko	Independent	3,100	1.33%
Against all		18,287	7.89%
Invalid ballots		8,213	3.55%
Total		231,596	100%
Registered voters/turnout		538,646	43.00%

=== 1999 ===
==== Declared candidates ====
- Viktor Boyko (SPS), businessman
- Aleksandr Burulko (CPRF), incumbent Member of State Duma (1998–present)
- Anatoly Gorobets (Nikolayev–Fyodorov Bloc), Accounts Chamber of Russia inspector
- Aleksandr Korolev (Independent), Head of the Ministry of Agriculture and Food of Russia Department of Food Markets, Standardization, Certification, and Product Quality (1997–present)
- Vladimir Murakhovsky (RSP), nonprofit executive
- Igor Vinogradov (SPR), businessman
- Albina Zhuravleva (Yabloko), accountant
- Viktoria Ziborova (Independent), nonprofit chairwoman, 1998 candidate for this seat

==== Failed to qualify ====
- Vasily Agarkov (DN)
- Aleksandr Grigoryants (Independent), attorney

==== Did not file ====
- Nadezhda Avdeyeva (Independent)
- Leonid Bazhanov (Independent), businessman
- Aleksandr Gritsayev (Independent)
- Yury Kharchuk (Independent), businessman
- Vasily Komlatsky (NDR), Kuban State Agrarian University department of pig breeding head, 1993 Choice of Russia candidate for this seat
- Andrey Kovyrzin (Independent)
- Yury Nagayev (Independent), director general of MAKS (1992–present)
- Aleksey Nizyulya (Independent)
- Igor Sergeyev (Independent), farmers' association chairman
- Ivan Vasilevsky (LDPR), Member of State Duma (1998–present)
- Mikhail Zager (Independent), construction businessman

==== Results ====
Summary of the 19 December 1999 Russian legislative election in the Kanevskaya constituency
Candidate	Party	Votes	%
Aleksandr Burulko (incumbent)	Communist Party	143,848	43.18%
Aleksandr Korolev	Independent	58,136	17.45%
Viktoria Ziborova	Independent	29,116	8.74%
Albina Zhuravleva	Yabloko	26,782	8.04%
Viktor Boyko	Union of Right Forces	26,086	7.83%
Anatoly Gorobets	Andrey Nikolayev and Svyatoslav Fyodorov Bloc	13,386	4.02%
Igor Vinogradov	Socialist Party	3,559	1.07%
Vladimir Murakhovsky	Russian Socialist Party	3,478	1.04%
against all		24,489	7.35%
Total		333,153	100%

=== 2003 ===
==== Declared candidates ====
- Aleksandr Burulko (CPRF), incumbent Member of State Duma (1998–present)
- Galina Doroshenko (Independent), Deputy Governor of Krasnodar Krai (2001–present)
- Svetlana Kretova (Yabloko), chairwoman of the Kanevsky District party office
- Lyubov Ospishcheva (Independent), unemployed

==== Failed to qualify ====
- Valery Sokolov (LDPR), physician, ultrasound technician
- Alen Volodin (NRPR), businessman
- Vladimir Vologin (ORP Rus'), private security businessman

==== Did not file ====
- Aleksandr Kofanov (Rodina), union leader
- Vladimir Litvinov (Independent), entrepreneur
- Mikhail Zager (Independent), construction businessman, 1999 candidate for this seat

==== Results ====
Summary of the 7 December 2003 Russian legislative election in the Kanevskaya constituency
Candidate	Party	Votes	%
Galina Doroshenko	Independent	147,282	56.47%
Aleksandr Burulko (incumbent)	Communist Party	57,425	22.20%
Svetlana Kretova	Yabloko	13,707	5.26%
Lyubov Ospishcheva	Independent	5,646	2.16%
against all		32,351	12.40%
Total		261,119	100%

=== 2016 ===
==== Declared candidates ====
- Aleksandr Baturinets (Yabloko), Member of Yeysky District Council (2007–present), businessman
- Natalya Boyeva (United Russia), Member of Legislative Assembly of Krasnodar Krai (2012–present), agribusinesswoman
- Oleg Kerimov (Party of Growth), Member of Seversky District Council (2015–present), businessman
- Andrey Rudenko (A Just Russia), Member of State Duma (2011–present), 2015 gubernatorial candidate
- Pavel Sokolenko (CPRF), Member of Legislative Assembly of Krasnodar Krai (2012–present), energy executive
- Andrey Tumin (Patriots of Russia), Member of Primorsko-Akhtarsk Council (2014–present), businessman
- Aleksandr Turenko (CPCR), Member of Kushchyovsky District Council (2004–present), municipal energy executive
- Stanislav Vasilevsky (LDPR), banker
- Vladimir Zverev (Rodina), former Mayor of Tuapse (2008–2009), construction executive

==== Failed to qualify ====
- Aleksandr Radoshevich (Independent), agricultural executive

==== Did not file ====
- Yury Sobolev (PRB), private kindergarten owner

==== Declined ====
- Vladimir Petrov (United Russia), Chairman of the Yeysky District Council (2012–present), former Member of Legislative Assembly of Krasnodar Krai (2002–2012) (lost the primary)
- Vasily Tolstopyatov (United Russia), sanatorium director, father of former State Duma member Vasily Tolstopyatov (lost the primary)

==== Results ====
Summary of the 18 September 2016 Russian legislative election in the Kanevskaya constituency
Candidate	Party	Votes	%
Natalya Boyeva	United Russia	152,823	58.47%
Pavel Sokolenko	Communist Party	25,919	9.92%
Stanislav Vasilevsky	Liberal Democratic Party	21,794	6.46%
Andrey Rudenko	A Just Russia	16,328	6.25%
Aleksandr Turenko	Communists of Russia	9,946	3.81%
Aleksandr Baturinets	Yabloko	9,943	3.80%
Vladimir Zverev	Rodina	8,433	3.23%
Andrey Tumin	Patriots of Russia	4,981	1.91%
Oleg Kerimov	Party of Growth	3,242	1.24%
Total		261,364	100%

=== 2021 ===
==== Declared candidates ====
- Mikhail Akhmetgareyev (CPRF), former Member of Yeysky District Council (2012–2017), logistics businessman
- Yulia Gazizova (LDPR), aide to Legislative Assembly of Krasnodar Krai member
- Vladimir Karpekin (RPPSS), retired businessman
- Vitaly Klimenko (GP), businessman
- Aleksandr Korovayny (Yabloko), Member of Yeysky District Council (2017–present), community activist
- Dmitry Lotsmanov (United Russia), Member of Legislative Assembly of Krasnodar Krai (2017–present), agribusinessman
- Andrey Stupak (Party of Growth), Member of Krylovskaya Council (2019–present), farmer
- Timur Tatyanchenko (The Greens), Member of Belorechensky District Council (2018–present)
- Aleksandr Tikhonov (SR–ZP), Member of Yeysk Council (2019–present), businessman
- Lyudmila Volynskaya (Rodina), Member of Yeysky District Council (2017–present)
- Eduard Vrublevsky (New People), attorney
- Aleksandr Yepishkin (RPSS), nonprofit staffer

==== Declined ====
- Natalya Boyeva (United Russia), incumbent Member of State Duma (2016–present)

==== Results ====
Summary of the 17-19 September 2021 Russian legislative election in the Kanevskaya constituency
Candidate	Party	Votes	%
Dmitry Lotsmanov	United Russia	179,745	53.71%
Mikhail Akhmetgareyev	Communist Party	50,377	15.05%
Yulia Gazizova	Liberal Democratic Party	13,658	4.08%
Aleksandr Korovayny	Yabloko	13,303	3.97%
Eduard Vrublevsky	New People	13,172	3.93%
Aleksandr Tikhonov	A Just Russia — For Truth	12,597	3.76%
Aleksandr Yepishkin	Russian Party of Freedom and Justice	10,234	3.06%
Vladimir Karpekin	Party of Pensioners	9,712	2.90%
Lyudmila Volynskaya	Rodina	8,260	2.47%
Vitaly Klimenko	Civic Platform	6,369	1.90%
Andrey Stupak	Party of Growth	5,197	1.55%
Timur Tatyanchenko	The Greens	2,962	0.89%
Total		334,654	100%

=== 2026 ===
==== Declared candidates ====
- Olga Bukhar (A Just Russia), Member of Krylovskaya Council (2024–present), retired primary school teacher
- Dmitry Lotsmanov (United Russia), incumbent Member of State Duma (2021–present)
- Pavel Pikta (CPRF), Member of Yeysk Council (2019–2022, 2024–present)
- Marina Savitskaya (LDPR), Member of Kanevskoy District Council (2025–present), legal counsel
- Eduard Vrublevsky (New People), Member of Kanevskoy District Council (2025–present), attorney, 2021 candidate for this seat

==== Results ====
Summary of the 18-20 September 2026 Russian legislative election in the Northern constituency
Candidate	Party	Votes	%
Dmitry Lotsmanov (incumbent)	United Russia	218,405	63.01%
Pavel Pikta	Communist Party	39,871	11.50%
Eduard Vrublevsky	New People	32,443	9.36%
Marina Savitskaya	Liberal Democratic Party	29,150	8.41%
Olga Bukhar	A Just Russia	21,913	6.32%
Total		346,602	100%
