= Privolny, Russia =

Privolny (Russian: Привольный; masculine), Privolnaya (Привольная; feminine), or Privolnoye (Привольное; neuter) is the name of several rural localities in Russia.

== Amur Oblast ==
As of 2010, two rural localities in Amur Oblast bear this name:

- Privolnoye, Mikhaylovsky District, Amur Oblast, a selo in Dubovskoy Rural Settlement of Mikhaylovsky District
- Privolnoye, Tambovsky District, Amur Oblast, a selo in Tambovsky Rural Settlement of Tambovsky District

== Chelyabinsk Oblast ==
As of 2010, one rural locality in Chelyabinsk Oblast bears this name:

- Privolny, Chelyabinsk Oblast, a settlement in Lazurnensky Selsoviet of Krasnoarmeysky District

== Republic of Dagestan ==
As of 2010, one rural locality in the Republic of Dagestan bears this name:

- Privolny, Republic of Dagestan, a selo in Yurkovsky Selsoviet of Tarumovsky District

== Irkutsk Oblast ==
As of 2010, one rural locality in Irkutsk Oblast bears this name:

- Privolnoye, Irkutsk Oblast, a village in Nizhneudinsky District

== Kaliningrad Oblast ==
As of 2010, four rural localities in Kaliningrad Oblast bear this name:

- Privolnoye, Chernyakhovsky District, a settlement in Kaluzhsky Rural Okrug of Chernyakhovsky District
- Privolnoye, Pravdinsky District, a settlement in Domnovsky Rural Okrug of Pravdinsky District
- Privolnoye, Slavsky District, a settlement in Bolshakovsky Rural Okrug of Slavsky District
- Privolnoye, Zelenogradsky District, a settlement in Kovrovsky Rural Okrug of Zelenogradsky District

== Republic of Kalmykia ==
As of 2010, one rural locality in the Republic of Kalmykia bears this name:

- Privolny, Republic of Kalmykia, a settlement in Privolnenskaya Rural Administration of Yashkulsky District

== Karachay-Cherkess Republic ==
As of 2010, one rural locality in the Karachay-Cherkess Republic bears this name:

- Privolnoye, Karachay-Cherkess Republic, a selo in Prikubansky District

== Kemerovo Oblast ==
As of 2010, one rural locality in Kemerovo Oblast bears this name:

- Privolny, Kemerovo Oblast, a settlement in Yelykayevskaya Rural Territory of Kemerovsky District

== Kirov Oblast ==
As of 2010, two rural localities in Kirov Oblast bear this name:

- Privolny, Kirov Oblast, a khutor under the administrative jurisdiction of the urban-type settlement of Bogorodskoye in Bogorodsky District
- Privolnoye, Kirov Oblast, a khutor under the administrative jurisdiction of the urban-type settlement of Svecha in Svechinsky District

== Krasnodar Krai ==
As of 2010, seven rural localities in Krasnodar Krai bear this name:

- Privolny, Belorechensky District, Krasnodar Krai, a khutor in Shkolny Rural Okrug of Belorechensky District
- Privolny, Bryukhovetsky District, Krasnodar Krai, a khutor in Bryukhovetsky Rural Okrug of Bryukhovetsky District
- Privolny, Kavkazsky District, Krasnodar Krai, a khutor in Privolny Rural Okrug of Kavkazsky District
- Privolny, Korenovsky District, Krasnodar Krai, a settlement in Novoberezansky Rural Okrug of Korenovsky District
- Privolny, Labinsky District, Krasnodar Krai, a khutor in Vladimirsky Rural Okrug of Labinsky District
- Privolny, Tikhoretsky District, Krasnodar Krai, a khutor in Khopersky Rural Okrug of Tikhoretsky District
- Privolnaya, Krasnodar Krai, a stanitsa in Privolnensky Rural Okrug of Kanevskoy District

== Kurgan Oblast ==
As of 2010, two rural localities in Kurgan Oblast bear this name:

- Privolnoye, Makushinsky District, Kurgan Oblast, a village in Konovalovsky Selsoviet of Makushinsky District
- Privolnoye, Polovinsky District, Kurgan Oblast, a selo in Privolnensky Selsoviet of Polovinsky District

== Lipetsk Oblast ==
As of 2010, one rural locality in Lipetsk Oblast bears this name:

- Privolny, Lipetsk Oblast, a settlement in Petrovsky Selsoviet of Izmalkovsky District

== Novosibirsk Oblast ==
As of 2010, one rural locality in Novosibirsk Oblast bears this name:

- Privolny, Novosibirsk Oblast, a settlement in Cherepanovsky District

== Omsk Oblast ==
As of 2010, one rural locality in Omsk Oblast bears this name:

- Privolnoye, Omsk Oblast, a village in Solyansky Rural Okrug of Cherlaksky District

== Orenburg Oblast ==
As of 2010, two rural localities in Orenburg Oblast bear this name:

- Privolny, Orenburg Oblast, a settlement in Yasnogorsky Selsoviet of Novosergiyevsky District
- Privolnoye, Orenburg Oblast, a selo in Privolny Selsoviet of Ileksky District

== Rostov Oblast ==
As of 2010, five rural localities in Rostov Oblast bear this name:

- Privolny, Bagayevsky District, Rostov Oblast, a settlement in Azhinovskoye Rural Settlement of Bagayevsky District
- Privolny, Oktyabrsky District, Rostov Oblast, a khutor in Kommunarskoye Rural Settlement of Oktyabrsky District
- Privolny, Proletarsky District, Rostov Oblast, a khutor in Mokroyelmutyanskoye Rural Settlement of Proletarsky District
- Privolny, Remontnensky District, Rostov Oblast, a settlement in Privolnenskoye Rural Settlement of Remontnensky District
- Privolny, Tselinsky District, Rostov Oblast, a khutor in Mikhaylovskoye Rural Settlement of Tselinsky District

== Samara Oblast ==
As of 2010, two rural localities in Samara Oblast bear this name:

- Privolny, Bezenchuksky District, Samara Oblast, a settlement in Bezenchuksky District
- Privolny, Koshkinsky District, Samara Oblast, a settlement in Koshkinsky District

== Saratov Oblast ==
As of 2010, three rural localities in Saratov Oblast bear this name:

- Privolny, Alexandrovo-Gaysky District, Saratov Oblast, a khutor in Alexandrovo-Gaysky District
- Privolny, Pitersky District, Saratov Oblast, a settlement in Pitersky District
- Privolnoye, Saratov Oblast, a selo in Rovensky District

== Stavropol Krai ==
As of 2010, six rural localities in Stavropol Krai bear this name:

- Privolnoye, Stavropol Krai, a selo in Privolnensky Selsoviet of Krasnogvardeysky District
- Privolny, Kochubeyevsky District, Stavropol Krai, a khutor in Georgiyevsky Selsoviet of Kochubeyevsky District
- Privolny, Kursky District, Stavropol Krai, a khutor in Poltavsky Selsoviet of Kursky District
- Privolny, Mineralovodsky District, Stavropol Krai, a settlement in Leninsky Selsoviet of Mineralovodsky District
- Privolny, Sovetsky District, Stavropol Krai, a khutor under the administrative jurisdiction of the Town of Zelenokumsk in Sovetsky District
- Privolnoye, Pyatigorsk, Stavropol Krai, a selo under the administrative jurisdiction of the city of krai significance of Pyatigorsk

== Tver Oblast ==
As of 2010, one rural locality in Tver Oblast bears this name:

- Privolnoye, Tver Oblast, a village in Belyanitskoye Rural Settlement of Sonkovsky District

== Udmurt Republic ==
As of 2010, one rural locality in the Udmurt Republic bears this name:

- Privolny, Udmurt Republic, a village in Verkhneyurinsky Selsoviet of Mozhginsky District

== Volgograd Oblast ==
As of 2010, one rural locality in Volgograd Oblast bears this name:

- Privolny, Volgograd Oblast, a settlement in Privolnensky Selsoviet of Svetloyarsky District

== Vologda Oblast ==
As of 2010, one rural locality in Vologda Oblast bears this name:

- Privolnaya, Vologda Oblast, a village in Sarayevsky Selsoviet of Kichmengsko-Gorodetsky District

== Voronezh Oblast ==
As of 2010, one rural locality in Voronezh Oblast bears this name:

- Privolny, Voronezh Oblast, a settlement in Rostoshinskoye Rural Settlement of Ertilsky District
