= Bogorodsky (inhabited locality) =

Bogorodsky (Russian: Богоро́дский; masculine), Bogorodskaya (Богоро́дская; feminine), or Bogorodskoye (Богоро́дское; neuter) is the name of several inhabited localities in Russia.

Urban localities

- Bogorodskoye, Kirov Oblast, an urban-type settlement in Bogorodsky District of Kirov Oblast
- Bogorodskoye, Moscow Oblast, a work settlement in Sergiyevo-Posadsky District of Moscow Oblast

Rural localities

- Bogorodsky, Republic of Bashkortostan, a village in Yermekeyevsky District of the Republic of Bashkortostan
- Bogorodsky, Udmurt Republic, a village in Alnashsky District of the Udmurt Republic
- Bogorodskaya, a village under the jurisdiction of Pervomaysky City District of Kirov, Kirov Oblast
- Bogorodskoye, Khabarovsk Krai, a selo in Ulchsky District of Khabarovsk Krai
- Bogorodskoye, name of several other rural localities
