= Primorsko-Akhtarsky =

Primorsko-Akhtarsky (masculine), Primorsko-Akhtarskaya (feminine), or Primorsko-Akhtarskoye (neuter) may refer to:

- Primorsko-Akhtarsky District, a district of Krasnodar Krai, Russia
- Primorsko-Akhtarskoye Urban Settlement, a municipal formation which the Town of Primorsko-Akhtarsk in Primorsko-Akhtarsky District of Krasnodar Krai, Russia is incorporated as
