= Bogorodsky =

Bogorodsky (masculine), Bogorodskaya (feminine), or Bogorodskoye (neuter) may refer to:

- Bogorodsky District, several districts in Russia
- Bogorodskoye District, a district in Eastern Administrative Okrug of Moscow, Russia
- Bogorodskoye Urban Settlement, several municipal urban settlements in Russia
- Bogorodsky (inhabited locality) (Bogorodskoye, Bogorodskaya), several inhabited localities in Russia

== See also ==
- Bogorodsk
- Bogoroditsky (disambiguation)
- Bogoroditsk
