= Bogorodskoye Urban Settlement =

Bogorodskoye Urban Settlement is the name of several municipal formations in Russia.

- Bogorodskoye Urban Settlement, a municipal formation which the Urban-Type Settlement of Bogorodskoye in Bogorodsky District of Kirov Oblast is incorporated as
- Bogorodskoye Urban Settlement, a municipal formation which the Work Settlement of Bogorodskoye in Sergiyevo-Posadsky District of Moscow Oblast is incorporated as

== See also ==
- Bogorodsky
