= Bogorodsky District =

Location of Kirov Oblast in Russia

Location of Nizhny Novgorod Oblast in Russia

Bogorodsky District is the name of several administrative and municipal districts in Russia.

== Modern districts ==
- Bogorodsky District, Kirov Oblast, an administrative and municipal district of Kirov Oblast
- Bogorodsky District, Nizhny Novgorod Oblast, an administrative and municipal district of Nizhny Novgorod Oblast

== Historical districts ==
- Bogorodsky District, Ural Oblast (1924–1931), a district of Ural Oblast of the Russian SFSR, Soviet Union

== See also ==
- Bogorodsky (disambiguation)
