= Bryukhovetskaya =

Bryukhovetskaya Брюховецкая
- Stanitsa
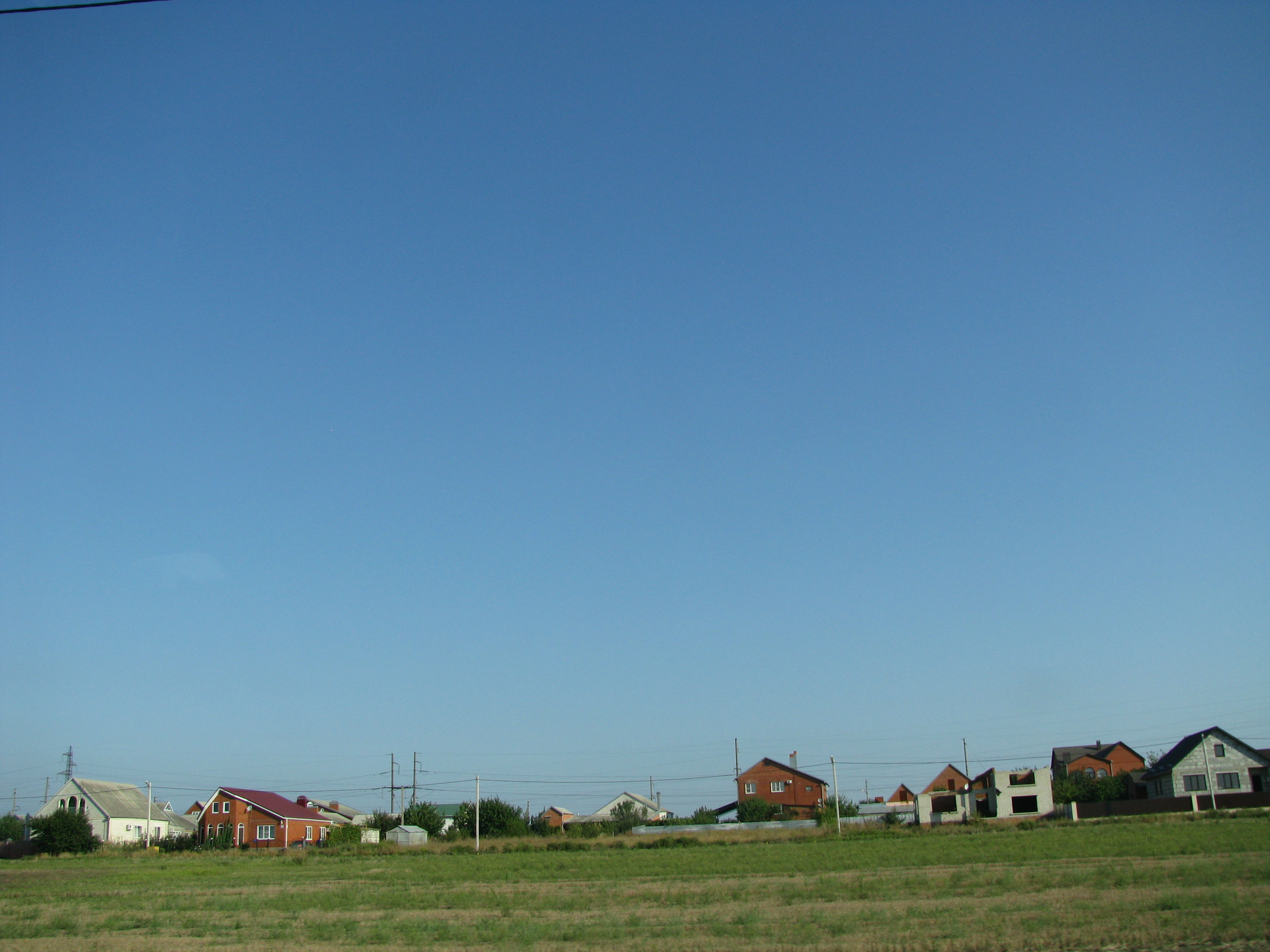
- View of Bryukhovetskaya

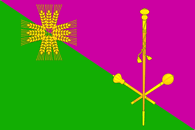
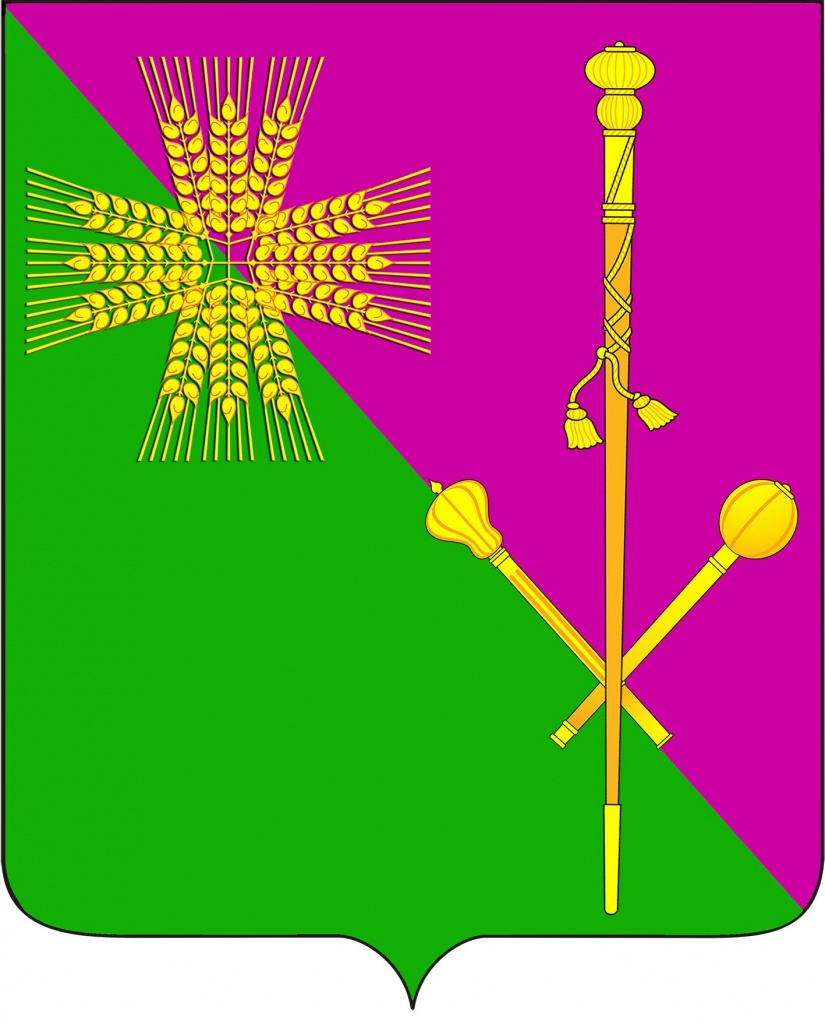
- Flag Coat of arms
- Interactive map of Bryukhovetskaya
- Location of Bryukhovetskaya Bryukhovetskaya (Krasnodar Krai)
- Coordinates: 45°48′N 39°00′E
- Country: Russia
- Federal subject: Krasnodar Krai
- Administrative district: Bryukhovetsky District
- Founded: 1794
- Elevation: 19 m (62 ft)

Population (2010 Census)
  - Total: 22,139
  - Estimate (2021): 19,154 (−13.5%)

Administrative status
  - Capital of: Bryukhovetsky District
- Time zone: UTC+3 (MSK)
- Postal code: 352750–352753
- OKTMO ID: 03610407101

Bryukhovetskaya (Russian: Брюхове́цкая) is a rural locality (a stanitsa) and the administrative center of Bryukhovetsky District in Krasnodar Krai, Russia, located on the Beysug River. Population: 22,139 (2010 census); 22,024 (2002 census); 21,518 (1989 Soviet census).
