= Staroshcherbinovskaya =

Staroshcherbinovskaya Старощербиновская
- Stanitsa
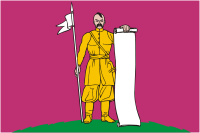
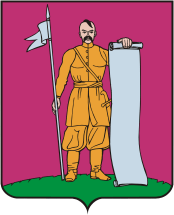
- Flag Coat of arms
- Location of Staroshcherbinovskaya
- Location of Staroshcherbinovskaya Staroshcherbinovskaya (Krasnodar Krai)
- Coordinates: 46°37′44″N 38°40′04″E
- Country: Russia
- Federal subject: Krasnodar Krai
- Administrative district: Shcherbinovsky District
- Founded: 1792
- Elevation: 10 m (30 ft)

Population (2010 Census)
  - Total: 18,010

Administrative status
  - Capital of: Shcherbinovsky District
- Time zone: UTC+3 (MSK)
- Postal code(s): 353620–353624
- OKTMO ID: 03659413101

Staroshcherbinovskaya (Russian: Старощербиновская) is a rural locality (a stanitsa) and the administrative center of Shcherbinovsky District of Krasnodar Krai, Russia. Population: 18,010 (2010 Census); 18,545 (2002 Census); 17,041 (1989 Soviet census).
