= Privolny =

Privolny (masculine), Privolnaya (feminine), or Privolnoye (neuter) may refer to:

- Privolnoye, Armenia, a town in Armenia
- Privolnoye, Azerbaijan, a village in Azerbaijan
- Privolny, Russia, several rural localities in Russia
