= Bogoroditsky (rural locality) =

Bogoroditsky (Russian: Богородицкий; masculine), Bogoroditskaya (Богородицкая; feminine), or Bogoroditskoye (Богородицкое; neuter) is the name of several rural localities in Russia.

== Modern localities ==
=== Belgorod Oblast ===
As of 2014, one rural locality in Belgorod Oblast bears this name:

Belgorod Oblast location map
Location of Bogoroditskoye in Belgorod Oblast

- Bogoroditskoye, Belgorod Oblast, a selo in Gubkinsky District; 51°10′N 37°21′E

=== Kaluga Oblast ===
As of 2014, one rural locality in Kaluga Oblast bears this name:

- Bogoroditskoye, Kaluga Oblast, a village in Sukhinichsky District

=== Kursk Oblast ===
As of 2014, two rural localities in Kursk Oblast bear this name:

- Bogoroditskoye, Gorshechensky District, Kursk Oblast, a selo under the administrative jurisdiction of Gorshechnoye Work Settlement in Gorshechensky District
- Bogoroditskoye, Shchigrovsky District, Kursk Oblast, a selo in Znamensky Selsoviet of Shchigrovsky District

=== Lipetsk Oblast ===
As of 2014, two rural localities in Lipetsk Oblast bear this name:

Lipetsk Oblast distribution map
Distribution of the inhabited localities called Bogoroditskoye in Lipetsk Oblast.

- Bogoroditskoye, Dobrinsky District, Lipetsk Oblast, a selo in Bogoroditsky Selsoviet of Dobrinsky District; 52°16′N 40°21′E
- Bogoroditskoye, Dobrovsky District, Lipetsk Oblast, a selo in Paninsky Selsoviet of Dobrovsky District; 52°49′N 39°47′E

=== Oryol Oblast ===
As of 2014, three rural localities in Oryol Oblast bear this name:

Oryol Oblast distribution map
Distribution of the inhabited localities called Bogoroditskoye in Oryol Oblast.

- Bogoroditskoye, Khotynetsky District, Oryol Oblast, a selo in Bogoroditsky Selsoviet of Khotynetsky District; 53°04′N 35°22′E
- Bogoroditskoye, Krasnoarmeysky Selsoviet, Sverdlovsky District, Oryol Oblast, a selo in Krasnoarmeysky Selsoviet of Sverdlovsky District; 52°35′N 36°27′E
- Bogoroditskoye, Novopetrovsky Selsoviet, Sverdlovsky District, Oryol Oblast, a village in Novopetrovsky Selsoviet of Sverdlovsky District; 52°49′N 36°23′E

=== Pskov Oblast ===
As of 2014, two rural localities in Pskov Oblast bear this name:

- Bogoroditskoye, Krasnogorodsky District, Pskov Oblast, a village in Krasnogorodsky District
- Bogoroditskoye, Velikoluksky District, Pskov Oblast, a village in Velikoluksky District

=== Rostov Oblast ===
As of 2014, one rural locality in Rostov Oblast bears this name:

Rostov Oblast location map
Location of Bogoroditskoye in Rostov Oblast

- Bogoroditskoye, Rostov Oblast, a selo in Bogoroditskoye Rural Settlement of Peschanokopsky District; 46°19′N 41°11′E

=== Ryazan Oblast ===
As of 2014, two rural localities in Ryazan Oblast bear this name:

- Bogoroditskoye, Miloslavsky District, Ryazan Oblast, a selo in Bogoroditsky Rural Okrug of Miloslavsky District
- Bogoroditskoye, Ukholovsky District, Ryazan Oblast, a selo in Bogoroditsky Rural Okrug of Ukholovsky District

=== Smolensk Oblast ===
As of 2014, three rural localities in Smolensk Oblast bear this name:

- Bogoroditskoye, Smolensky District, Smolensk Oblast, a village in Kozinskoye Rural Settlement of Smolensky District
- Bogoroditskoye, Vyazemsky District, Smolensk Oblast, a selo in Maslovskoye Rural Settlement of Vyazemsky District
- Bogoroditskoye, Yelninsky District, Smolensk Oblast, a village in Bobrovichskoye Rural Settlement of Yelninsky District

=== Tambov Oblast ===
As of 2014, three rural localities in Tambov Oblast bear this name:

- Bogoroditskoye, Tambov Oblast, a selo in Yekaterininsky Selsoviet of Nikiforovsky District
- Bogoroditskaya, Morshansky District, Tambov Oblast, a village in Starotomnikovsky Selsoviet of Morshansky District
- Bogoroditskaya, Petrovsky District, Tambov Oblast, a village in Volchkovsky Selsoviet of Petrovsky District

=== Tula Oblast ===
As of 2014, three rural localities in Tula Oblast bear this name:

- Bogoroditskoye, Chernsky District, Tula Oblast, a village in Popovskaya Rural Administration of Chernsky District
- Bogoroditskoye, Dubensky District, Tula Oblast, a village in Luzhensky Rural Okrug of Dubensky District
- Bogoroditskoye, Venyovsky District, Tula Oblast, a village in Rassvetovsky Rural Okrug of Venyovsky District

=== Voronezh Oblast ===
As of 2014, one rural locality in Voronezh Oblast bears this name:

- Bogoroditskoye, Voronezh Oblast, a settlement in Dmitriyevskoye Rural Settlement of Paninsky District

== Alternative names ==
- Bogoroditskaya, alternative name of Bogoroditskoye, a selo in Bogoroditsky Selsoviet of Khotynetsky District in Oryol Oblast; 53°04′N 35°22′E
- Bogoroditskoye, alternative name of Bogorodskoye, a selo in Denisovsky Selsoviet of Meleuzovsky District in the Republic of Bashkortostan; 52°59′N 55°40′E
- Bogoroditskoye, alternative name of Bogorodskoye, a selo in Shemetovskoye Rural Settlement of Sergiyevo-Posadsky District in Moscow Oblast; 56°32′N 37°53′E
- Bogoroditskoye, alternative name of Khormaly, a selo in Khormalinskoye Rural Settlement of Ibresinsky District in the Chuvash Republic; 55°18′N 47°15′E
