= Brigadny =

Brigadny (Russian: Брига́дный; masculine), Brigadnaya (Брига́дная; feminine), or Brigadnoye (Брига́дное; neuter) is the name of several rural localities in Russia:

- Brigadny (rural locality), a settlement in Novopokrovsky Rural Okrug of Primorsko-Akhtarsky District of Krasnodar Krai
- Brigadnoye, Kaliningrad Oblast, a settlement in Turgenevsky Rural Okrug of Polessky District of Kaliningrad Oblast
- Brigadnoye, Leningrad Oblast, a logging depot settlement under the administrative jurisdiction of Priozerskoye Settlement Municipal Formation, Priozersky District, Leningrad Oblast
