= Khansky =

Khansky (masculine), Khanskaya (feminine), or Khanskoye (neuter) may refer to:

- Khanskaya, a rural locality (a stanitsa) under the administrative jurisdiction of Maykop Republican Urban Okrug in the Republic of Adygea, Russia
- Khanskaya Airport, a military airport in the Republic of Adygea, Russia
- Lake Khanskoye, a salt lake in Krasnodar Krai, Russia
