= Yeysky =

Yeysky (masculine), Yeyskaya (feminine), or Yeyskoye (neuter) may refer to:

- Yeysky District, a district of Krasnodar Krai, Russia
- Yeysky (rural locality), a rural locality (a khutor) in Rostov Oblast, Russia
