= Krylovskaya, Krylovsky District, Krasnodar Krai =

Krylovskaya Крыловская
- Stanitsa
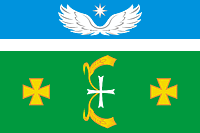
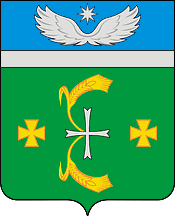
- Flag Coat of arms
- Interactive map of Krylovskaya
- Location of Krylovskaya Krylovskaya (Krasnodar Krai)
- Coordinates: 46°19′19″N 39°57′51″E
- Country: Russia
- Federal subject: Krasnodar Krai
- Administrative district: Krylovsky District
- Founded: 1794
- Elevation: 29 m (95 ft)

Population (2010 Census)
  - Total: 13,621
  - Estimate (2021): 12,797 (−6%)

Administrative status
  - Capital of: Krylovsky District
- Time zone: UTC+3 (MSK)
- Postal codes: 352080, 352081
- OKTMO ID: 03624411101

Krylovskaya (Russian: Крыловская) is a rural locality (a stanitsa) and the administrative center of Krylovsky District in Krasnodar Krai, Russia, located on the Yeya River. Population: 13,621 (2010 census); 14,419 (2002 census); 11,995 (1989 Soviet census).
