= Dmitry Lotsmanov =

Russian politician

- Дмитрий Лоцманов
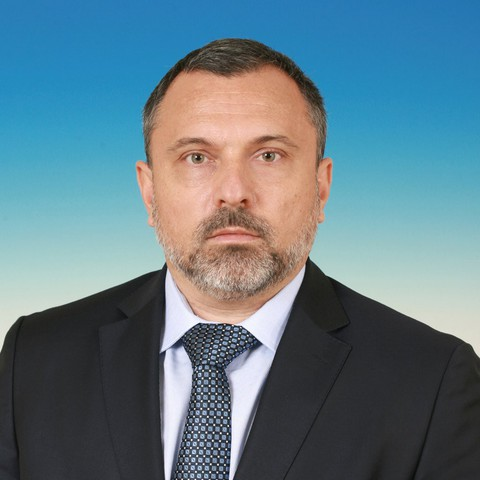
- official portrait, circa 2021

Member of the State Duma for Krasnodar Krai
- Incumbent
- Assumed office 12 October 2021
- Preceded by: Natalya Boyeva
- Constituency: Kanevskaya (No. 53)

Personal details
- Born: 2 March 1975 (age 51) Armavir, Krasnodar Krai, Russian SFSR, USSR
- Party: United Russia
- Education: Higher Economic College of the Kuban State Technological University

Dmitry Nikolaevich Lotsmanov (Russian: Дмитрий Николаевич Лоцманов; born March 2, 1975, Armavir) is a Russian political figure and a deputy of the 8th State Duma.

From 1994 to 2004, Lotsmanov engaged in business and worked in the company Kuban-Union Business, where he held positions from regional representative to deputy general director of the company. From 2004 to 2021, he worked at the Kubankhleb, founded by his father Nikolai Lotsmanov. In 2004-2008, he was the deputy of the Tikhoretsk City Council. In 2017-2021, Lotsmanov was the deputy of the Legislative Assembly of Krasnodar Krai. Since September 2021, he has served as deputy of the 8th State Duma.

In 2021, Dmitry Lotsmanov was ranked 39th in the Forbes ranking of the wealthiest civil servants in Russia.

== Sanctions ==
He was sanctioned by Canada under the Special Economic Measures Act (S.C. 1992, c. 17) in relation to the Russian invasion of Ukraine for Grave Breach of International Peace and Security, and by the UK government in 2022 in relation to Russo-Ukrainian War.
