= Shcherbinovsky District =

Shcherbinovsky District Щербиновский район (Russian)
- District
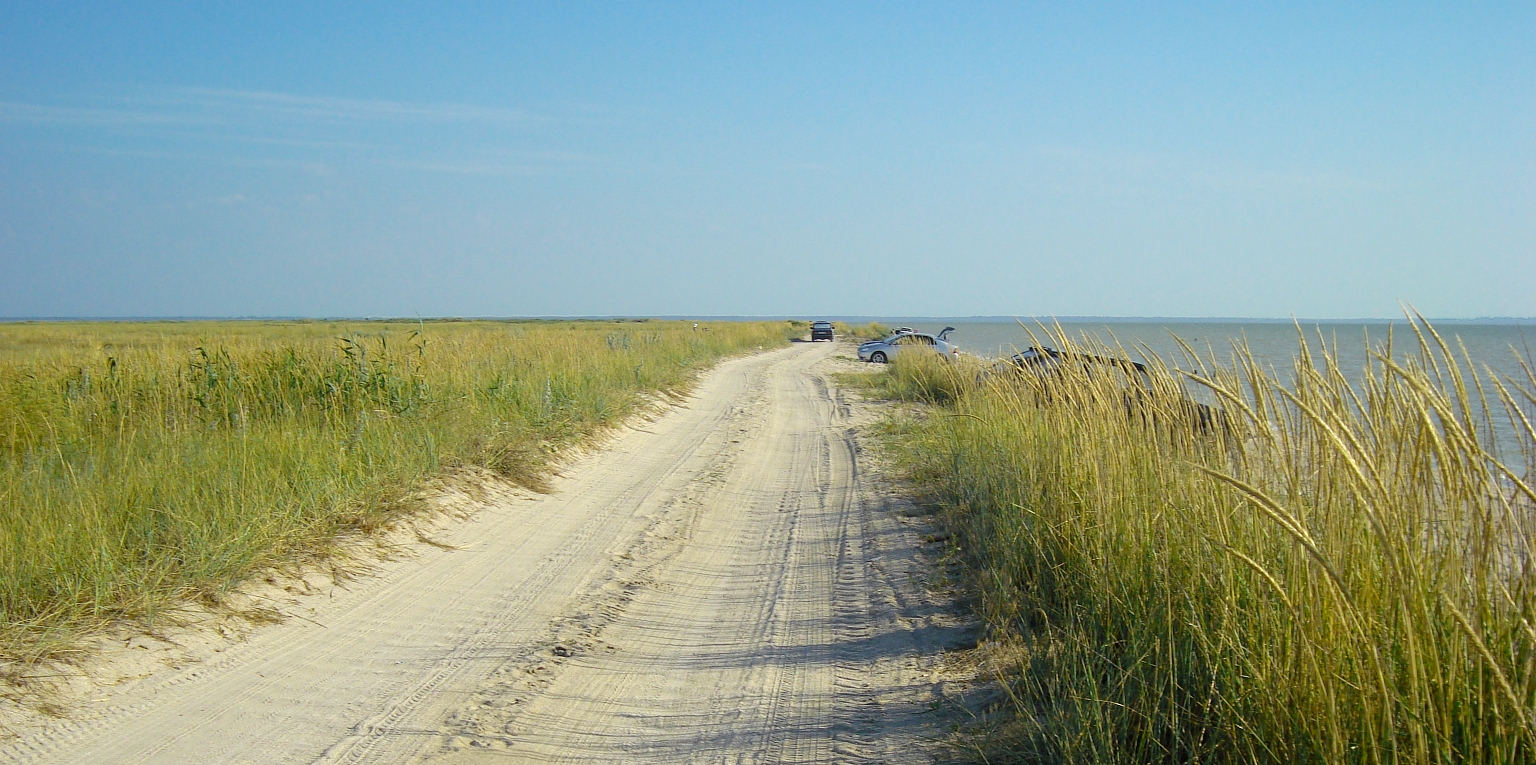
- Glafirovskaya Spit, Shcherbinovsky District

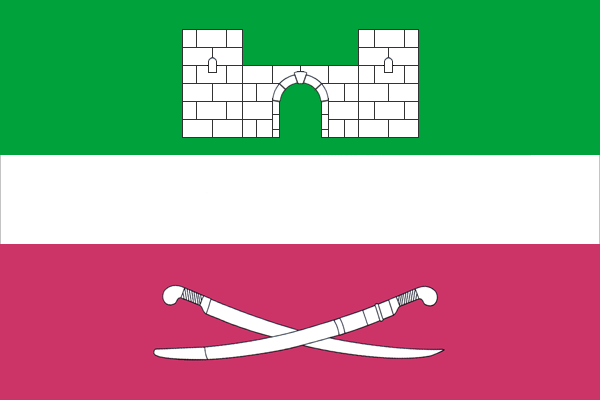
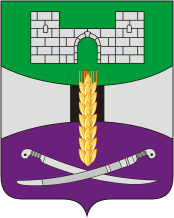
- Flag Coat of arms
- Location of Shcherbinovsky District in Krasnodar Krai
- Coordinates: 46°27′44″N 38°40′04″E
- Country: Russia
- Federal subject: Krasnodar Krai
- Established: 1934
- Administrative center: Staroshcherbinovskaya

Area
  - Total: 1,377 km^{2} (532 sq mi)

Population (2010 Census)
  - Total: 37,301
  - Density: 27.09/km^{2} (70.16/sq mi)
  - Urban: 0%
  - Rural: 100%

Administrative structure
  - Administrative divisions: 8 Rural okrugs
  - Inhabited localities: 15 rural localities

Municipal structure
  - Municipally incorporated as: Shcherbinovsky Municipal District
  - Municipal divisions: 0 urban settlements, 8 rural settlements
- Time zone: UTC+3 (MSK)
- OKTMO ID: 03659000
- Website: http://staradm.ru/

Shcherbinovsky District (Russian: Щерби́новский райо́н) is an administrative district (raion), one of the thirty-eight in Krasnodar Krai, Russia. As a municipal division, it is incorporated as Shcherbinovsky Municipal District. It is located in the north of the krai. The area of the district is 1,377 square kilometers (532 sq mi). Its administrative center is the rural locality (a stanitsa) of Staroshcherbinovskaya. Population: 37,301 (2010 census); 38,816 (2002 census); 36,208 (1989 Soviet census). The population of Staroshcherbinovskaya accounts for 48.3% of the district's total population.
