= Kanevskaya =

Kanevskaya Каневская
- Stanitsa
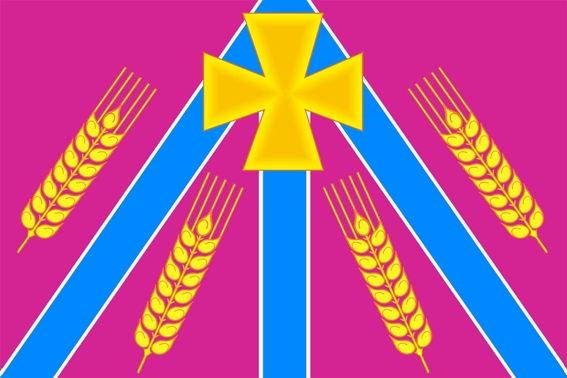
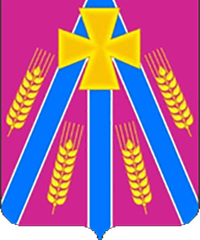
- Flag Coat of arms
- Interactive map of Kanevskaya
- Location of Kanevskaya Kanevskaya (Krasnodar Krai)
- Coordinates: 46°4′45″N 38°58′0″E
- Country: Russia
- Federal subject: Krasnodar Krai
- Founded: 1794
- Elevation: 14 m (46 ft)

Population (2010 Census)
  - Total: 44,386
  - Estimate (2021): 41,721 (−6%)

Administrative status
  - Subordinated to: Kanevskoy District
- Time zone: UTC+3 (MSK)
- Postal code: 353730–353733
- OKTMO ID: 03620402101

Kanevskaya (Russian: Каневска́я) is a stanitsa and the administrative center of Kanevskoy District of Krasnodar Krai, Russia.

== History ==
Kanevskaya was founded in 1794 among the first forty settlements of the Black Sea Cossacks in the Kuban. The name was transferred from the kuren of the Zaporizhzhya Sich.

== Population ==
Population: 44,755 (2002); 44,386 (2010 census); 45,334 (2020).
