= Bogoroditsky =

Bogoroditsky (masculine), Bogoroditskaya (feminine), or Bogoroditskoye (neuter) may refer to:

- Bogoroditsky District, a district of Tula Oblast, Russia
- Bogoroditsky (rural locality) (Bogoroditskaya, Bogoroditskoye), several rural localities in Russia
