= Krylovsky District =

Krylovsky District Крыловский район (Russian)
- District
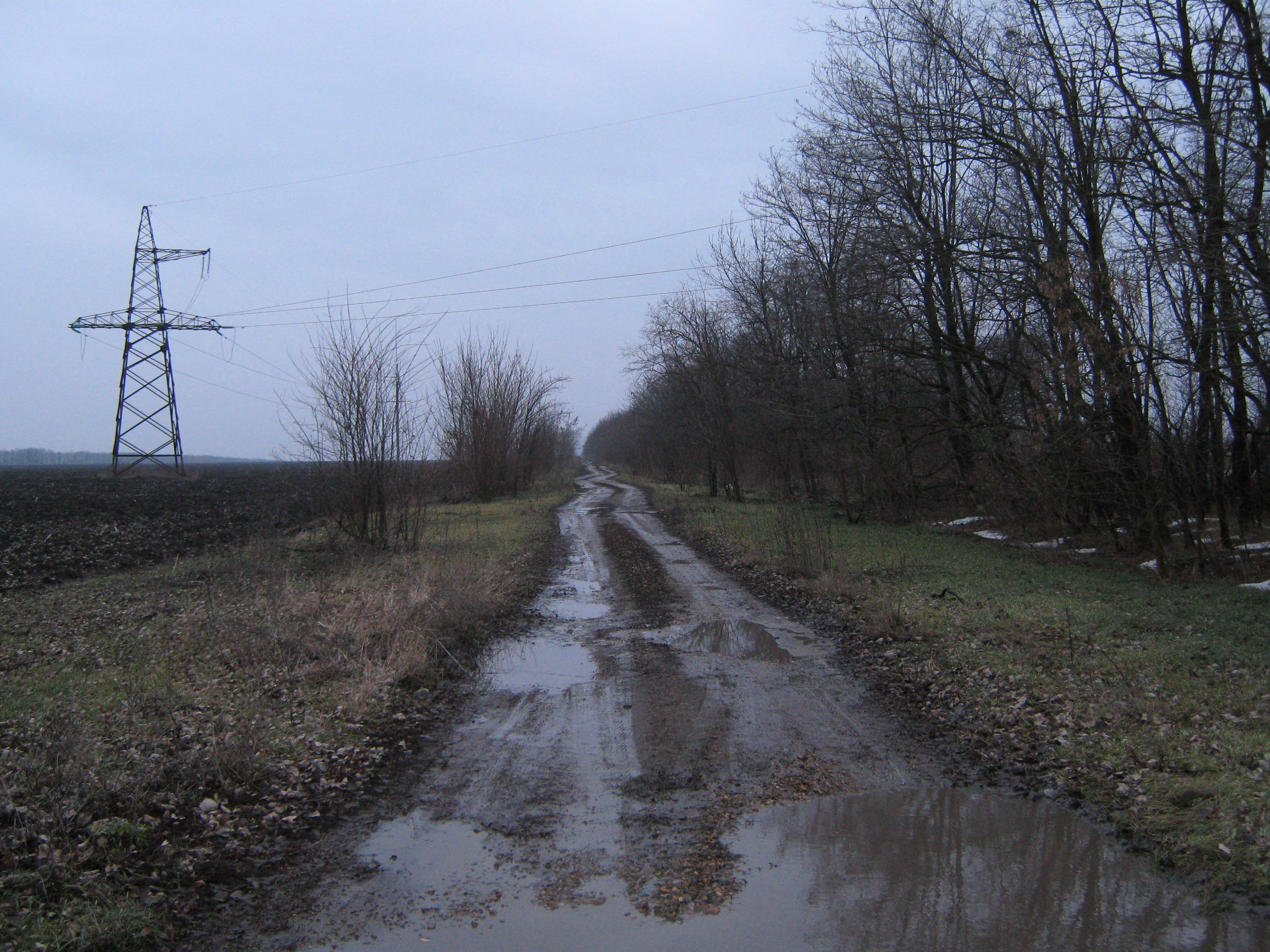
- Rural road in Krylovsky District

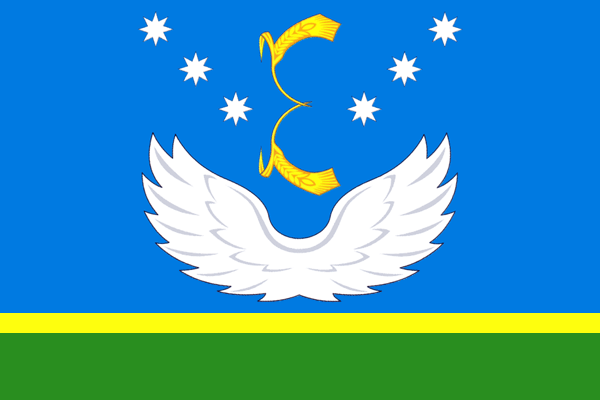
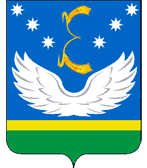
- Flag Coat of arms
- Location of Krylovsky District in Krasnodar Krai
- Coordinates: 46°19′19″N 39°57′51″E
- Country: Russia
- Federal subject: Krasnodar Krai
- Established: 31 December 1934
- Administrative center: Krylovskaya

Area
  - Total: 1,363.3 km^{2} (526.4 sq mi)

Population (2010 Census)
  - Total: 35,930
  - Density: 26.36/km^{2} (68.26/sq mi)
  - Urban: 0%
  - Rural: 100%

Administrative structure
  - Administrative divisions: 6 Rural okrugs
  - Inhabited localities: 30 rural localities

Municipal structure
  - Municipally incorporated as: Krylovsky Municipal District
  - Municipal divisions: 0 urban settlements, 6 rural settlements
- Time zone: UTC+3 (MSK)
- OKTMO ID: 03624000
- Website: http://www.krilovskaya.ru/

Krylovsky District (Russian: Кры́ловский райо́н) is an administrative district (raion), one of the thirty-eight in Krasnodar Krai, Russia. As a municipal division, it is incorporated as Krylovsky Municipal District. It is located in the northeast of the krai. The area of the district is 1,363.3 square kilometers (526.4 sq mi). Its administrative center is the rural locality (a stanitsa) of Krylovskaya. Population: 35,930 (2010 census); 37,657 (2002 census); 33,098 (1989 Soviet census). The population of Krylovskaya accounts for 37.9% of the district's total population.
