= Kalnibolotskaya =

Kalnibolotskaya Калниболотская
- Stanitsa
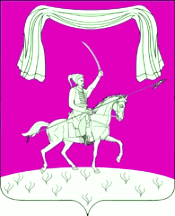
- Coat of arms
- Interactive map of Kalnibolotskaya
- Location of Kalnibolotskaya Kalnibolotskaya (Krasnodar Krai)
- Coordinates: 46°00′16″N 40°27′26″E
- Country: Russia
- Federal subject: Krasnodar Krai
- Administrative district: Novopokrovsky District
- Founded: 1794
- Elevation: 44 m (144 ft)

Population (2010 Census)
  - Total: 5,722
  - Estimate (2021): 5,422 (−5.2%)
- Time zone: UTC+3 (MSK)
- Postal codes: 353000, 353001
- OKTMO ID: 03635407101

Kalnibolotskaya (Russian: Калниболо́тская) is a rural locality (a stanitsa) in Novopokrovsky District of Krasnodar Krai, Russia, located on the Yeya River. Population: 5,722 (2010 census); 6,494 (2002 census).
