= Kanevskoy District =

Kanevskoy District Каневской район (Russian)
- District
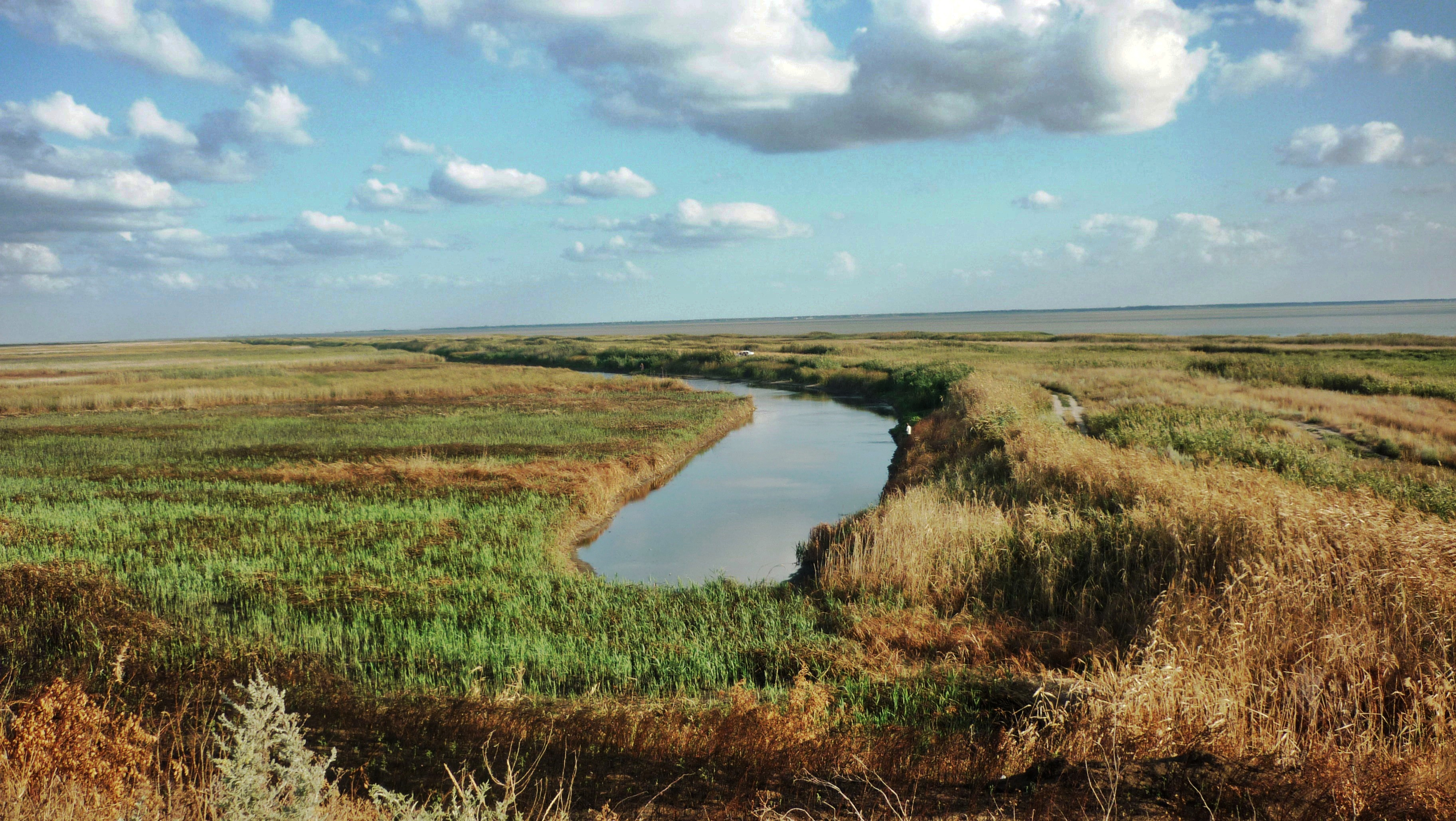
- Azov reed bed, Kanevskoy District

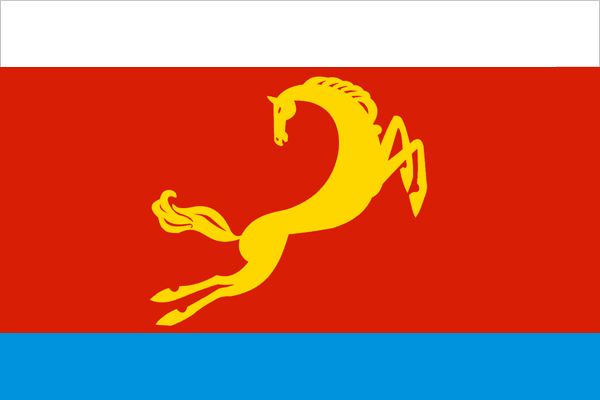
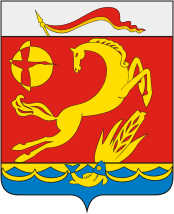
- Flag Coat of arms
- Location of Kanevskoy District in Krasnodar Krai
- Coordinates: 46°04′43″N 38°58′09″E
- Country: Russia
- Federal subject: Krasnodar Krai
- Established: 1924
- Administrative center: Kanevskaya

Area
  - Total: 2,483 km^{2} (959 sq mi)

Population (2010 Census)
  - Total: 102,624
  - Density: 41.33/km^{2} (107.0/sq mi)
  - Urban: 0%
  - Rural: 100%

Administrative structure
  - Administrative divisions: 9 Rural okrugs
  - Inhabited localities: 38 rural localities

Municipal structure
  - Municipally incorporated as: Kanevskoy Municipal District
  - Municipal divisions: 0 urban settlements, 9 rural settlements
- Time zone: UTC+3 (MSK)
- OKTMO ID: 03620000
- Website: http://www.kanevskadm.ru/

Kanevskoy District (Russian: Каневско́й райо́н), known as Kanevsky District (Каневский район) before March 2009, is an administrative district (raion), one of the thirty-eight in Krasnodar Krai, Russia. As a municipal division, it is incorporated as Kanevskoy Municipal District. It is located in the north of the krai. The area of the district is 2,483 square kilometers (959 sq mi). Its administrative center is the rural locality (a stanitsa) of Kanevskaya. Population: 102,624 (2010 census); 102,245 (2002 census); 88,415 (1989 Soviet census). The population of Kanevskaya accounts for 43.3% of the district's total population.
