= Privolny, Voronezh Oblast =

Privolny Привольный
- Settlement
- Location within Voronezh Oblast Location within Russia
- Coordinates: 51°34′N 40°50′E
- Country: Russia
- Region: Voronezh Oblast
- District: Ertilsky District
- Time zone: UTC+3:00

Privolny (Russian: Привольный) is a rural locality (a settlement) and the administrative center of Rostoshinskoye Rural Settlement, Ertilsky District, Voronezh Oblast, Russia. The population was 79 as of 2010.

== Geography ==
Privolny is located 36 km south of Ertil (the district's administrative centre) by road. Rostoshi is the nearest rural locality.
