= Bogorodsky, Republic of Bashkortostan =

Bogorodsky Богородский
- Village
- Location within Bashkortostan Location within Russia
- Coordinates: 54°15′N 53°43′E
- Country: Russia
- Region: Bashkortostan
- District: Yermekeyevsky District
- Time zone: UTC+5:00

Bogorodsky (Russian: Богородский) is a rural locality (a village) in Sukkulovsky Selsoviet, Yermekeyevsky District, Bashkortostan, Russia. The population was 78 as of 2010. There is 1 street.

== Geography ==
Bogorodsky is located 25 km north of Yermekeyevo (the district's administrative centre) by road. Knyazevka is the nearest rural locality.
