= Bogorodskoye, Khabarovsk Krai =

Rural locality in Khabarovsk Krai, Russia

Coordinates: 52°22′09″N 140°26′19″E

Bogorodskoye (Russian: Богородское) is a rural locality (a selo) and the administrative center of Ulchsky District, Khabarovsk Krai, Russia. Population: 3,900 (2010 census); 4,232 (2002 census); 4,935 (1989 Soviet census).
