= Privolny, Republic of Dagestan =

Privolny Привольный
- Selo
- Location within Republic of Dagestan Location within Russia
- Coordinates: 44°06′N 46°39′E
- Country: Russia
- Region: Republic of Dagestan
- District: Tarumovsky District
- Time zone: UTC+3:00

Privolny (Russian: Привольный) is a rural locality (a selo) in Yurkovsky Selsoviet, Tarumovsky District, Republic of Dagestan, Russia. Population: 451 (2010 census); 443 (2002 census); 425 (1989 Soviet census). There are 2 streets.

== Geography ==
Privolny is located 12 km east of Tarumovka (the district's administrative centre) by road. Tarumovka is the nearest rural locality.
