= Privolnoye, Mikhaylovsky District, Amur Oblast =

Privolnoye Привольное
- Selo
- Location within Amur Oblast Location within Russia
- Coordinates: 49°40′N 128°52′E
- Country: Russia
- Region: Amur Oblast
- District: Mikhaylovsky District
- Time zone: UTC+9:00

Privolnoye (Russian: Приво́льное, romanized: Privólʹnoye, IPA: [prʲɪˈvolʲnəjə]) is a rural locality (a selo) in Dubovsky Selsoviet of Mikhaylovsky District, Amur Oblast, Russia. The population was 50 as of 2018. There are 2 streets.

== Geography ==
Privolnoye is located 30 km northeast of Poyarkovo (the district's administrative centre) by road. Dubovoye is the nearest rural locality.
