= Bryukhovetsky District =

Bryukhovetsky District Брюховецкий район (Russian)
- District
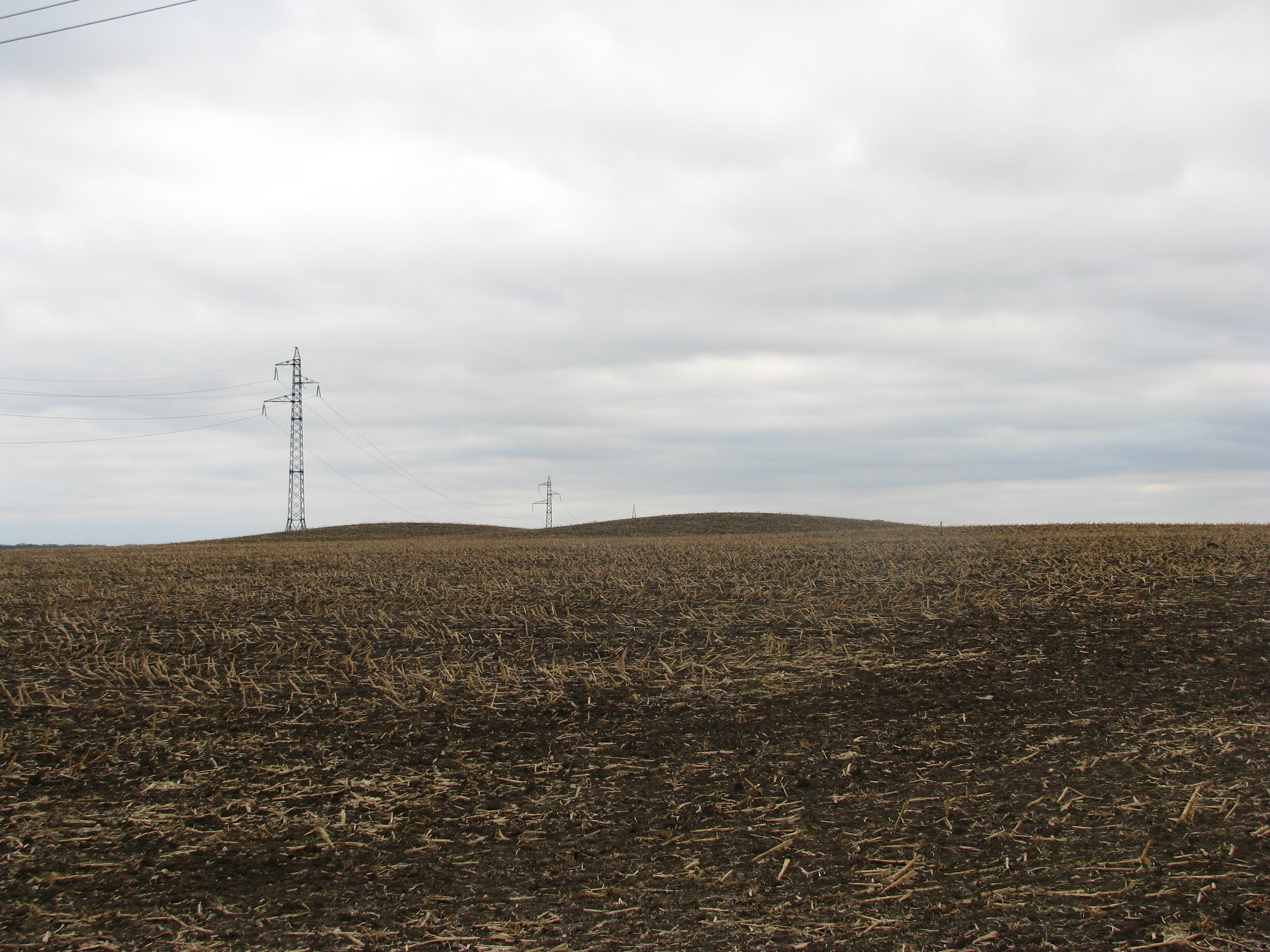
- Five barrows, village Bryukhovetskaya, Bryukhovetsky district

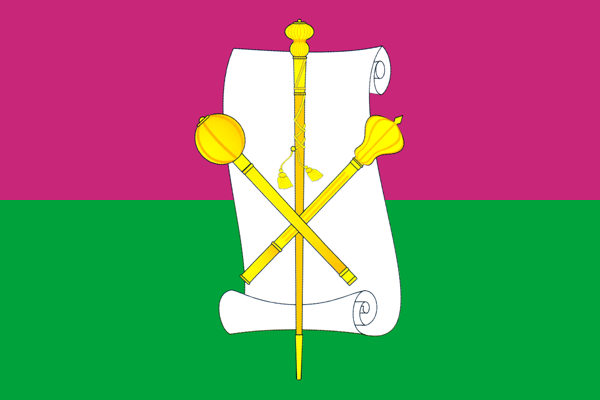
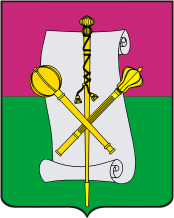
- Flag Coat of arms
- Location of Bryukhovetsky District in Krasnodar Krai
- Coordinates: 45°48′05″N 39°00′15″E
- Country: Russia
- Federal subject: Krasnodar Krai
- Administrative center: Bryukhovetskaya

Area
  - Total: 1,376 km^{2} (531 sq mi)

Population (2010 Census)
  - Total: 53,028
  - Density: 38.54/km^{2} (99.81/sq mi)
  - Urban: 0%
  - Rural: 100%

Administrative structure
  - Administrative divisions: 8 Rural okrugs
  - Inhabited localities: 33 rural localities

Municipal structure
  - Municipally incorporated as: Bryukhovetsky Municipal District
  - Municipal divisions: 0 urban settlements, 8 rural settlements
- Time zone: UTC+3 (MSK)
- OKTMO ID: 03610000
- Website: http://www.bruhoveckaya.ru/

Bryukhovetsky District (Russian: Брюхове́цкий райо́н) is an administrative district (raion), one of the thirty-eight in Krasnodar Krai, Russia. As a municipal division, it is incorporated as the Bryukhovetsky Municipal District. It is located in the northern central part of the krai. The area of the district is 1,376 square kilometers (531 sq mi). Its administrative center is the rural locality (a stanitsa) of Bryukhovetskaya. Population: 53,028 (2010 census); 54,594 (2002 census); 51,755 (1989 Soviet census). The population of Bryukhovetskaya accounts for 41.7% of the district's total population.
