= Bogorodskoye, Meleuzovsky District, Republic of Bashkortostan =

Bogorodskoye Богородское
- Selo
- Location within Bashkortostan Location within Russia
- Coordinates: 52°59′N 55°39′E
- Country: Russia
- Region: Bashkortostan
- District: Meleuzovsky District
- Time zone: UTC+5:00

Bogorodskoye (Russian: Богородское) is a rural locality (a village) and the administrative centre of Denisovsky Selsoviet, Meleuzovsky District, Bashkortostan, Russia. The population was 508 as of 2010. There are 6 streets.

== Geography ==
Bogorodskoye is located 26 km northwest of Meleuz (the district's administrative centre) by road. Mikhaylovka is the nearest rural locality.
