= Ulchsky District =

Ulchsky District Ульчский район (Russian)
- District
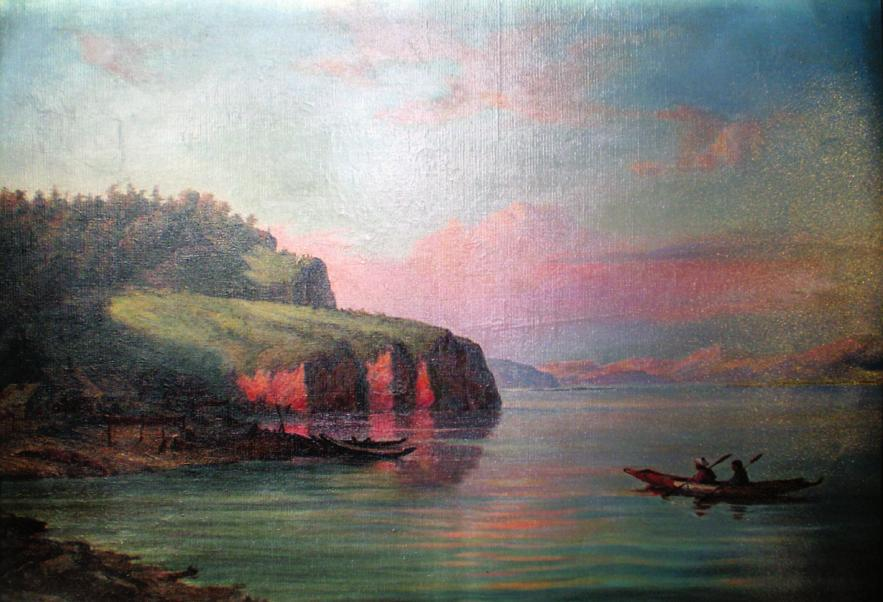
- Tyr village on the Amur River, by Yegor Meyer

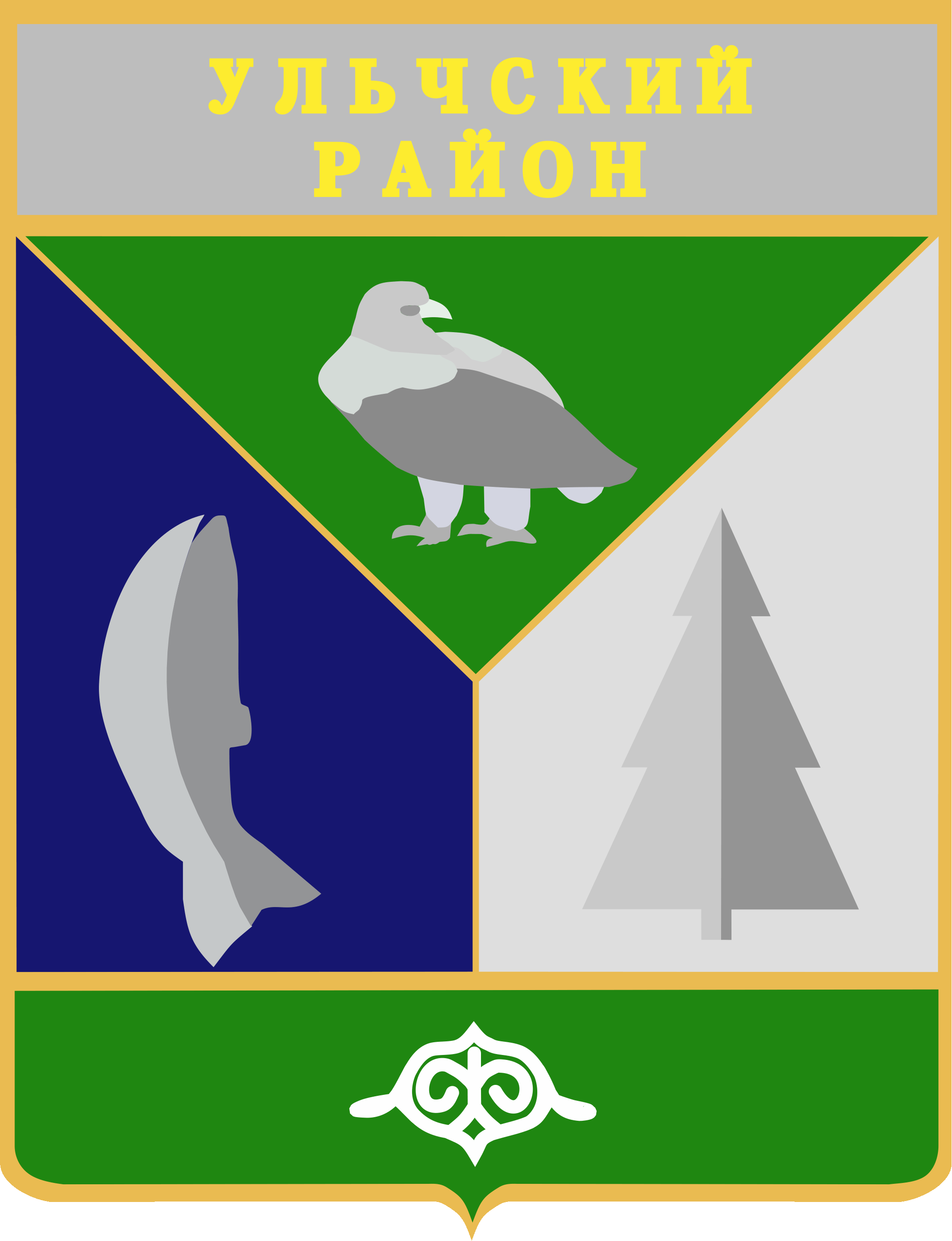
- Coat of arms
- Location of Ulchsky District in Khabarovsk Krai
- Coordinates: 52°22′19″N 140°26′13″E
- Country: Russia
- Federal subject: Khabarovsk Krai
- Established: 17 January 1933
- Administrative center: Bogorodskoye

Area
  - Total: 39,128 km^{2} (15,107 sq mi)

Population (2010 Census)
  - Total: 18,729
  - Density: 0.47866/km^{2} (1.2397/sq mi)
  - Urban: 0%
  - Rural: 100%

Administrative structure
  - Inhabited localities: 32 rural localities

Municipal structure
  - Municipally incorporated as: Ulchsky Municipal District
  - Municipal divisions: 0 urban settlements, 18 rural settlements
- Time zone: UTC+10 (MSK+7)
- OKTMO ID: 08650000
- Website: http://www.adminulchi.ru/

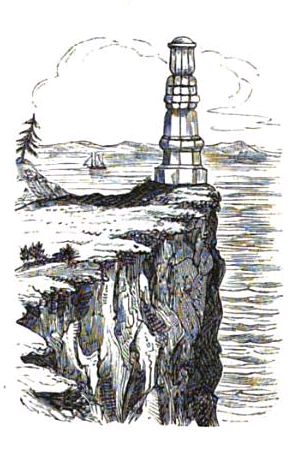
The Tyr Cliff as seen by Ernst Georg Ravenstein ca. 1860

Ulchsky District (Russian: У́льчский райо́н, romanized: Ulchskiy rayon) is an administrative and municipal district (raion), one of the seventeen in Khabarovsk Krai, Russia. It is located in the east of the krai and named after the indigenous Ulch people. The area of the district is 39,128 square kilometers (15,107 sq mi). Its administrative center is the rural locality (a selo) of Bogorodskoye. Population: 18,729 (2010 census); 23,930 (2002 census); 28,746 (1989 Soviet census). The population of Bogorodskoye accounts for 20.8% of the district's total population.

== History ==
A number of interesting Yuan and Ming Dynasty archaeological monuments have been found on the Tyr Cliff near the village of Tyr in this district.

== Demographics ==
Over 90% of the Russian population of Ulch people live in Ulchsky District.
