= Bogoroditskoye, Voronezh Oblast =

Bogoroditskoye Богородицкое
- Settlement
- Location within Voronezh Oblast Location within Russia
- Coordinates: 51°42′N 40°04′E
- Country: Russia
- Region: Voronezh Oblast
- District: Paninsky District
- Time zone: UTC+3:00

Bogoroditskoye (Russian: Богородицкое) is a rural locality (a settlement) in Dmitriyevskoye Rural Settlement, Paninsky District, Voronezh Oblast, Russia. The population was 35 as of 2010.

== Geography ==
Bogoroditskoye is located on the Pravaya Khava River, 22 km northwest of Panino (the district's administrative centre) by road. Dmitriyevka is the nearest rural locality.
