= Lake Khanskoye =

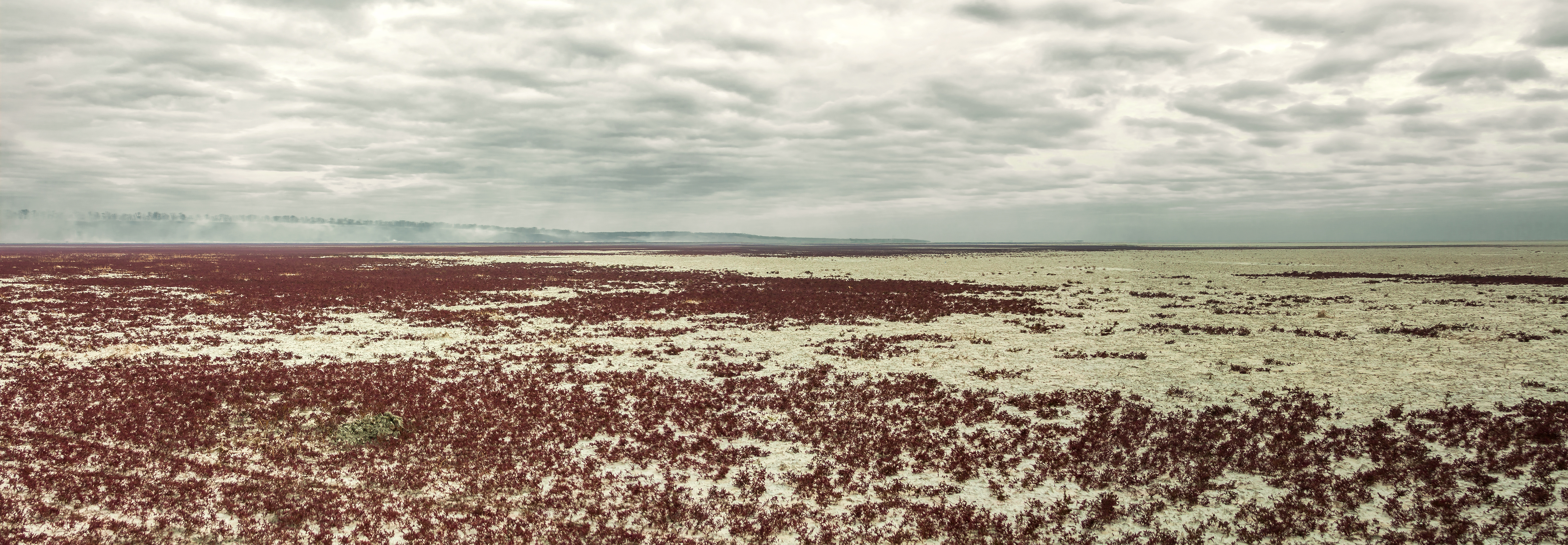
- The lake dries up in summertime.

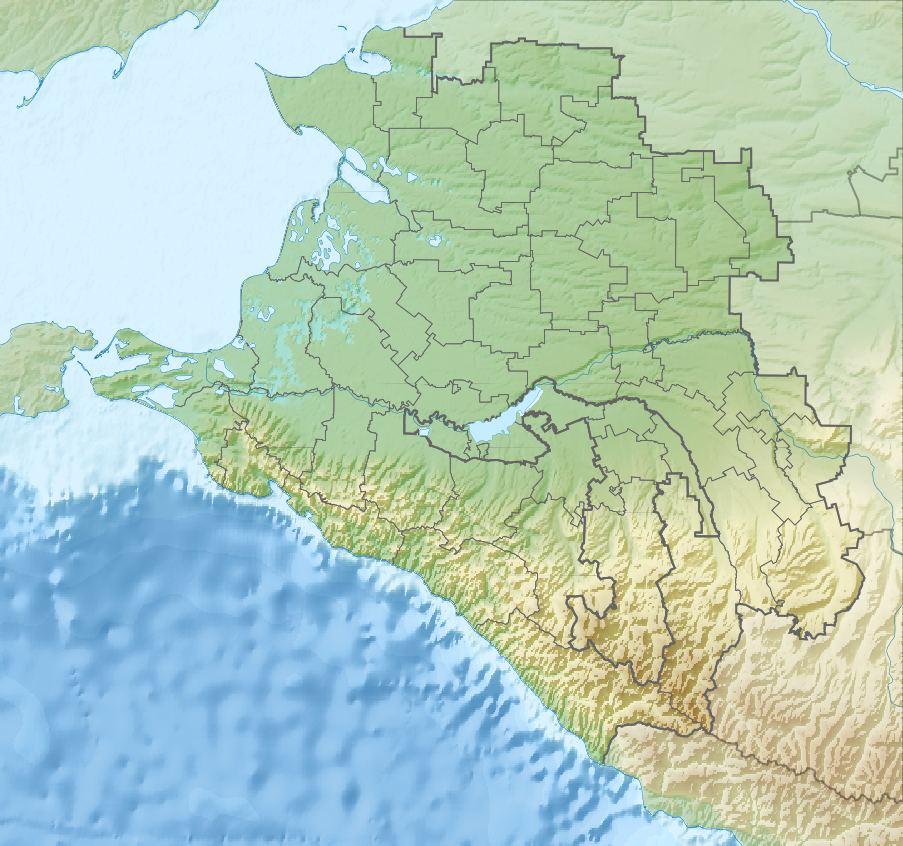
- Location within Krasnodar Krai
- Location: Yeysky District, Krasnodar Krai, Russia
- Coordinates: 46°15′N 38°22′E
- Type: Salt lake
- Max. length: 19 km (12 miles)
- Max. width: 7 km (4.3 miles)
- Max. depth: 1.8 m (5.9 ft)

Lake Khanskoye ("Khan's Lake", Ханское озеро; also Tatar Lake, Татарское озеро) is a salt lake near Yeysk, in Yeysky District, Krasnodar Krai, Russia. The lake is 19 kilometres (12 miles) long and 7 kilometres (4.3 miles) wide. It has a depth of up to 1.8 metres (5.9 ft).

A narrow spit separates it from the eastern shore of the Sea of Azov. It used to be an inlet of the sea and was connected to the Baisug Lagoon. The lake is about 12 times saltier than the neighbouring sea. In a hot summer the lake dries up exposing large deposits of mud which may be used for balneological purposes. Legend has it that one khan of Crimea liked to bathe in the lake's healing waters, hence the name.

The Khanskoye has several islets with large nestings of great cormorants and Dalmatian pelicans. The shape and configuration of the islets have been changing over the years.
