= Privolny, Volgograd Oblast =

Privolny Привольный
- Settlement
- Location within Volgograd Oblast Location within Russia
- Coordinates: 48°09′N 44°06′E
- Country: Russia
- Region: Volgograd Oblast
- District: Svetloyarsky District
- Time zone: UTC+4:00

Privolny (Russian: Привольный) is a rural locality (a settlement) in Svetloyarsky District, Volgograd Oblast, Russia. The population was 1,608 as of 2010. There are 18 streets.

== Geography ==
Privolny is located 75 km southwest of Svetly Yar (the district's administrative centre) by road. Abganerovo is the nearest rural locality.
