= Yeysky District =

Yeysky District Ейский район (Russian)
- District
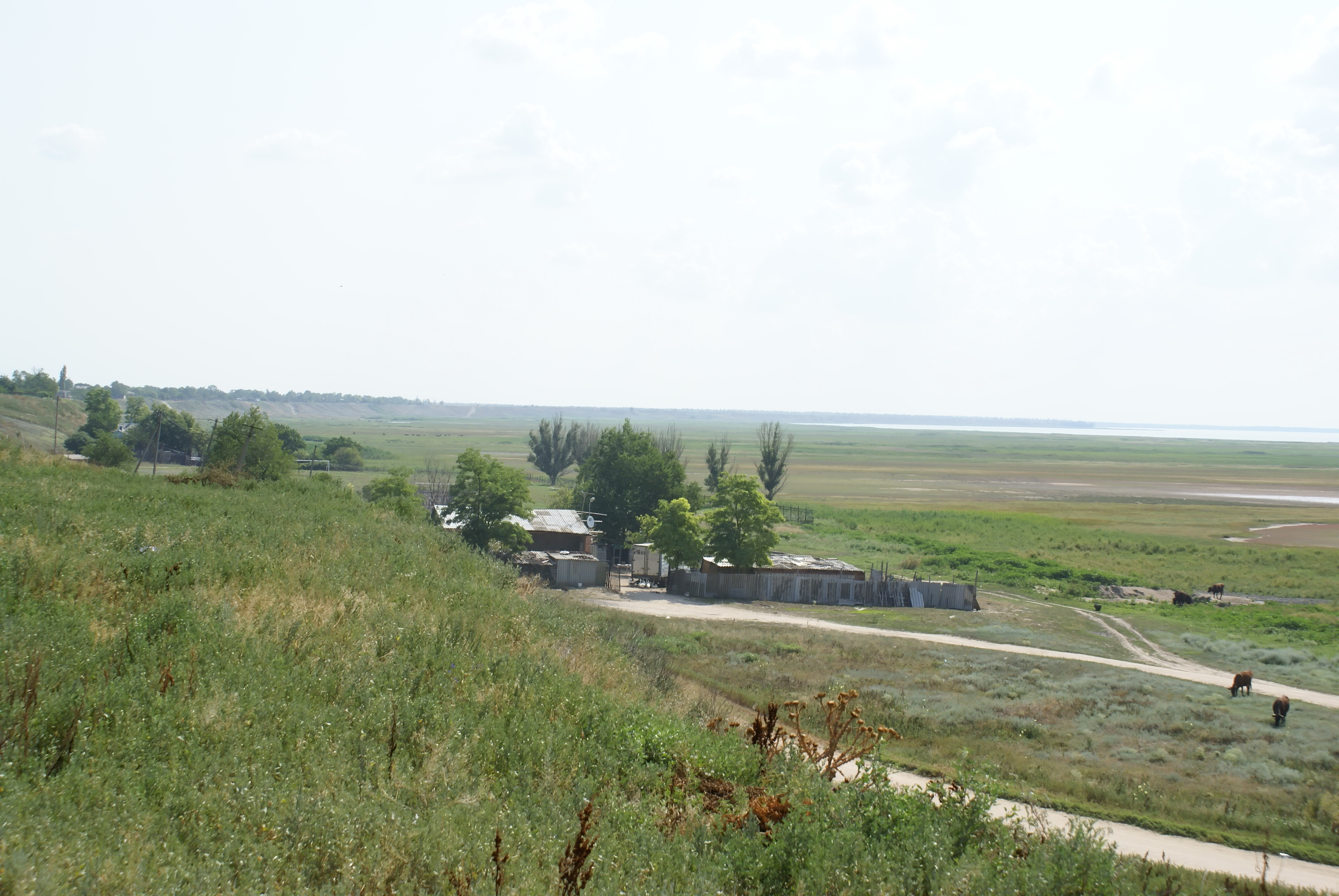
- Landscape in Yeysky District

- Flag Coat of arms
- Location of Yeysky District in Krasnodar Krai
- Coordinates: 46°41′N 38°17′E
- Country: Russia
- Federal subject: Krasnodar Krai
- Established: 1924
- Administrative center: Yeysk

Area
  - Total: 2,120 km^{2} (820 sq mi)

Population (2010 Census)
  - Total: 44,067
  - Density: 20.8/km^{2} (53.8/sq mi)
  - Urban: 0%
  - Rural: 100%

Administrative structure
  - Administrative divisions: 10 Rural okrugs
  - Inhabited localities: 32 rural localities

Municipal structure
  - Municipally incorporated as: Yeysky Municipal District
  - Municipal divisions: 1 urban settlements, 10 rural settlements
- Time zone: UTC+3 (MSK)
- OKTMO ID: 03616000
- Website: http://yeiskraion.ru/

Yeysky District (Russian: Е́йский райо́н) is an administrative district (raion), one of the thirty-eight in Krasnodar Krai, Russia. As a municipal division, it is incorporated as Yeysky Municipal District. It is located in the northwest of the krai. The area of the district is 2,120 square kilometers (820 sq mi). Its administrative center is the town of Yeysk (which is not administratively a part of the district). Population: 44,067 (2010 census); 43,962 (2002 census); 40,165 (1989 Soviet census).

== Geography ==
Yeysky District is home to Lake Khanskoye.

== Administrative and municipal status ==
Within the framework of administrative divisions, Yeysky District is one of the thirty-eight in the krai. The town of Yeysk serves as its administrative center, despite being incorporated separately as an administrative unit with the status equal to that of the districts (and which, in addition to Yeysk, also includes seven rural localities).

As a municipal division, the district is incorporated as Yeysky Municipal District, with the Town of Yeysk being incorporated within it as Yeyskoye Urban Settlement.
