= Primorsko-Akhtarsk =

Primorsko-Akhtarsk Приморско-Ахтарск
- Town
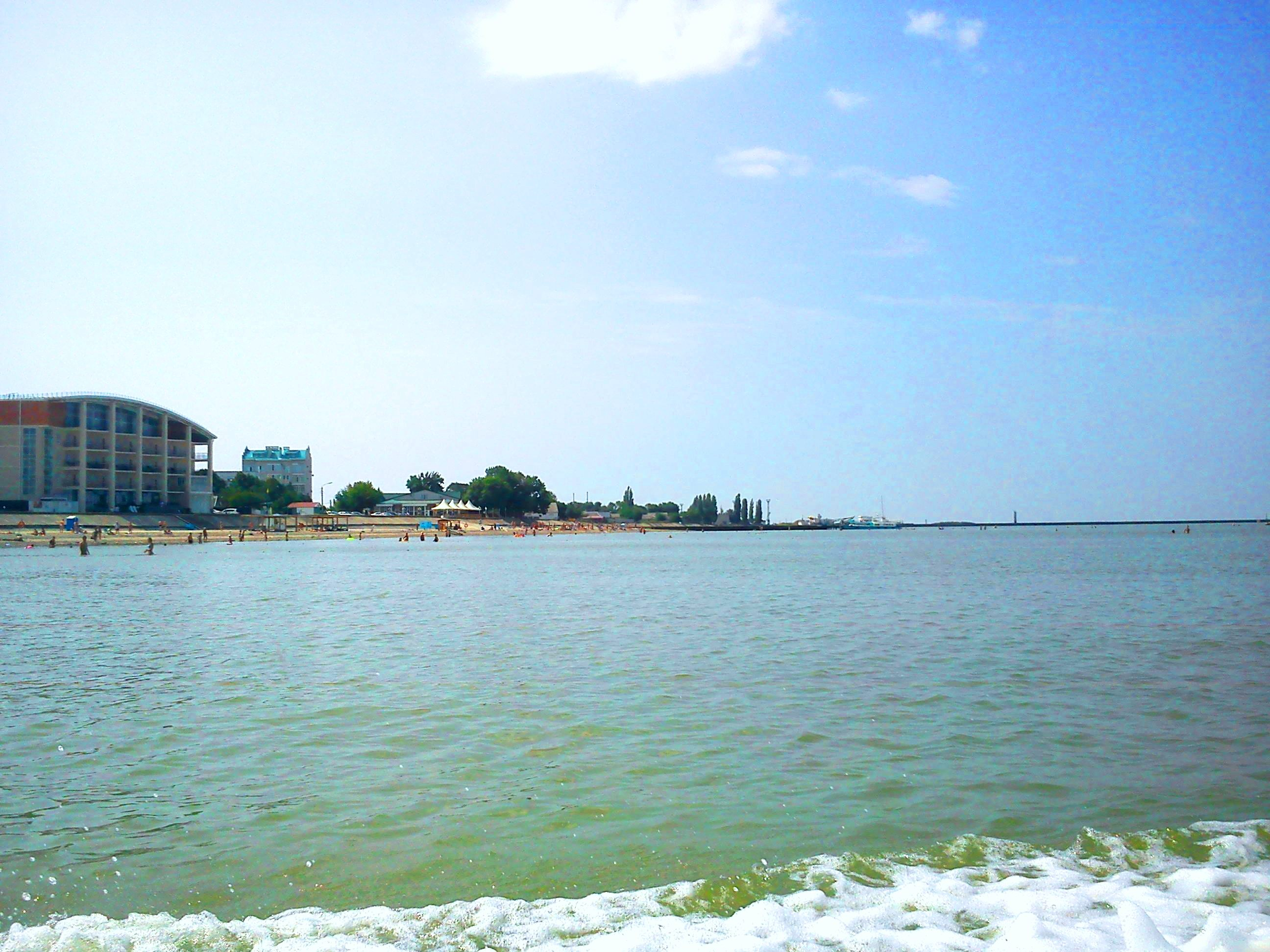
- Beach in Primorsko-Akhtarsk

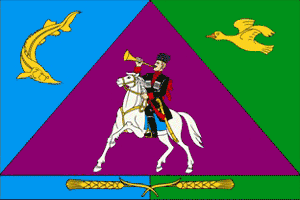
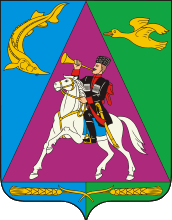
- Flag Coat of arms
- Interactive map of Primorsko-Akhtarsk
- Location of Primorsko-Akhtarsk Primorsko-Akhtarsk (Krasnodar Krai)
- Coordinates: 46°03′N 38°10′E
- Country: Russia
- Federal subject: Krasnodar Krai
- Administrative district: Primorsko-Akhtarsky District
- TownSelsoviet: Primorsko-Akhtarsk
- Founded: 1829
- Town status since: 1949
- Elevation: 2 m (6.6 ft)

Population (2010 Census)
  - Total: 32,257
  - Estimate (2025): 30,084 (−6.7%)

Administrative status
  - Capital of: Primorsko-Akhtarsky District, Town of Primorsko-Akhtarsk

Municipal status
  - Municipal district: Primorsko-Akhtarsky Municipal District
  - Urban settlement: Primorsko-Akhtarskoye Urban Settlement
  - Capital of: Primorsko-Akhtarsky Municipal District, Primorsko-Akhtarskoye Urban Settlement
- Time zone: UTC+3 (MSK)
- Postal code: 353860–353866
- OKTMO ID: 03641101001
- Website: prim-ahtarsk.ru/homepage.html

Primorsko-Akhtarsk (Russian: Примо́рско-Ахта́рск) is a port town and the administrative center of Primorsko-Akhtarsky District of Krasnodar Krai, Russia, located on the coast of the Sea of Azov, 151 kilometers (94 mi) northwest of Krasnodar, the administrative center of the krai. Population: 32,257 (2010 census); 32,677 (2002 census); 30,047 (1989 Soviet census).

== History ==
It was founded in 1829. Town status was granted to it in 1949.

A Russian Air Force base is located to the north east.

== Administrative and municipal status ==
Within the framework of administrative divisions, Primorsko-Akhtarsk serves as the administrative center of Primorsko-Akhtarsky District. As an administrative division, it is, together with three rural localities, incorporated within Primorsko-Akhtarsky District as the Town of Primorsko-Akhtarsk. As a municipal division, the town of Primorsko-Akhtarsk is incorporated within Primorsko-Akhtarsky Municipal District as Primorsko-Akhtarskoye Urban Settlement.

== Geography ==
=== Climate ===
Climate data for Primorsko-Akhtarsk (1991–2020 normals, extremes 1914–present)
Month	Jan	Feb	Mar	Apr	May	Jun	Jul	Aug	Sep	Oct	Nov	Dec	Year
Record high °C (°F)	17.7 (63.9)	21.4 (70.5)	26.5 (79.7)	32.8 (91.0)	36.1 (97.0)	39.3 (102.7)	40.7 (105.3)	40.3 (104.5)	37.3 (99.1)	33.7 (92.7)	24.5 (76.1)	20.7 (69.3)	40.7 (105.3)
Mean daily maximum °C (°F)	2.5 (36.5)	4.1 (39.4)	9.5 (49.1)	16.7 (62.1)	23.0 (73.4)	27.3 (81.1)	30.1 (86.2)	29.9 (85.8)	24.1 (75.4)	16.9 (62.4)	9.2 (48.6)	4.2 (39.6)	16.5 (61.7)
Daily mean °C (°F)	−0.6 (30.9)	0.1 (32.2)	5.0 (41.0)	11.6 (52.9)	17.9 (64.2)	22.5 (72.5)	25.2 (77.4)	24.6 (76.3)	18.8 (65.8)	12.2 (54.0)	5.3 (41.5)	1.1 (34.0)	12 (54)
Mean daily minimum °C (°F)	−2.9 (26.8)	−2.6 (27.3)	2.0 (35.6)	7.9 (46.2)	13.9 (57.0)	18.5 (65.3)	20.9 (69.6)	20.0 (68.0)	14.8 (58.6)	8.7 (47.7)	2.6 (36.7)	−1.2 (29.8)	8.6 (47.5)
Record low °C (°F)	−27.2 (−17.0)	−27.8 (−18.0)	−17.4 (0.7)	−4.8 (23.4)	2.0 (35.6)	8.0 (46.4)	12.1 (53.8)	7.8 (46.0)	0.9 (33.6)	−7.2 (19.0)	−21.1 (−6.0)	−22.8 (−9.0)	−27.2 (−17.0)
Average precipitation mm (inches)	54 (2.1)	44 (1.7)	47 (1.9)	36 (1.4)	48 (1.9)	59 (2.3)	45 (1.8)	43 (1.7)	45 (1.8)	44 (1.7)	45 (1.8)	50 (2.0)	558 (22.0)
Average extreme snow depth cm (inches)	3 (1.2)	3 (1.2)	1 (0.4)	0 (0)	0 (0)	0 (0)	0 (0)	0 (0)	0 (0)	0 (0)	0 (0)	1 (0.4)	3 (1.2)
Average rainy days	11	11	13	13	12	11	8	7	10	11	13	13	133
Average snowy days	9	9	6	0.3	0	0	0	0	0	0.4	3	9	102
Average relative humidity (%)	84	81	78	72	69	70	66	66	70	76	83	85	75
Source: Погода и Климат
