= Primorsko-Akhtarsky District =

Primorsko-Akhtarsky District Приморско-Ахтарский район (Russian)
- District
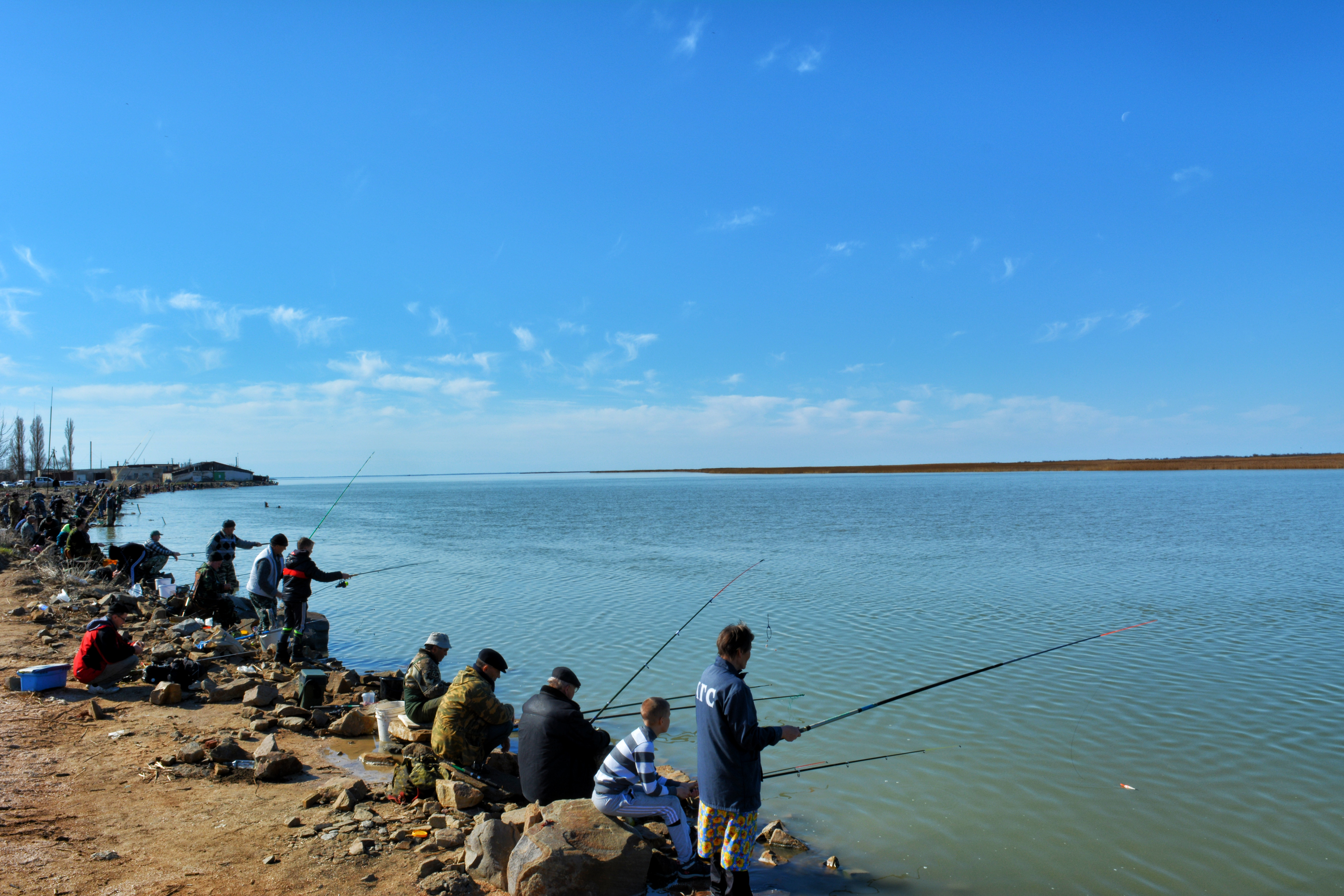
- Yasenskaya Spit, Primorsko-Akhtarsky District

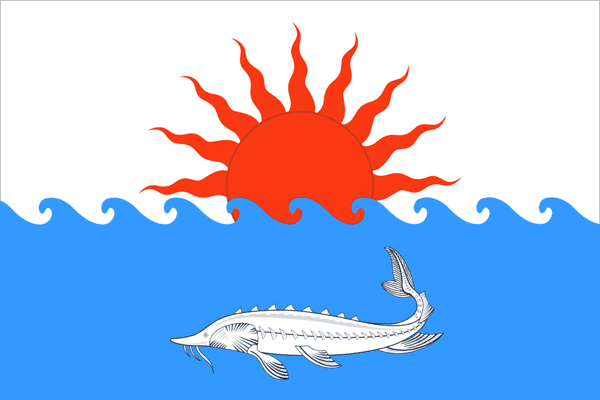
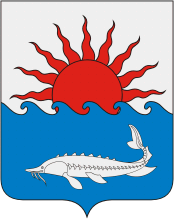
- Flag Coat of arms
- Location of Primorsko-Akhtarsky District in Krasnodar Krai
- Coordinates: 46°02′49″N 38°10′31″E
- Country: Russia
- Federal subject: Krasnodar Krai
- Established: 2 June 1924
- Administrative center: Primorsko-Akhtarsk

Area
  - Total: 2,503.6 km^{2} (966.6 sq mi)

Population (2010 Census)
  - Total: 60,327
  - Density: 24.096/km^{2} (62.409/sq mi)
  - Urban: 53.5%
  - Rural: 46.5%

Administrative structure
  - Administrative divisions: 1 Towns, 8 Rural okrugs
  - Inhabited localities: 1 cities/towns, 34 rural localities

Municipal structure
  - Municipally incorporated as: Primorsko-Akhtarsky Municipal District
  - Municipal divisions: 1 urban settlements, 8 rural settlements
- Time zone: UTC+3 (MSK)
- OKTMO ID: 03641000
- Website: http://prahtarsk.ru/

Primorsko-Akhtarsky District (Russian: Примо́рско-Ахтарский райо́н) is an administrative district (raion), one of the thirty-eight in Krasnodar Krai, Russia. As a municipal division, it is incorporated as Primorsko-Akhtarsky Municipal District. It is located in the west of the krai. The area of the district is 2,503.6 square kilometers (966.6 sq mi). Its administrative center is the town of Primorsko-Akhtarsk. Population: 60,327 (2010 census); 60,913 (2002 census); 54,795 (1989 Soviet census). The population of Primorsko-Akhtarsk accounts for 53.5% of the district's total population.
