= Bogorodskoye, Kirov Oblast =

Bogorodskoye Богородское
- Urban-type settlement
- Interactive map of Bogorodskoye
- Location of Bogorodskoye Bogorodskoye (Kirov Oblast)
- Coordinates: 57.8295°N 50.7531°E
- Country: Russia
- Federal subject: Kirov Oblast
- Administrative district: Bogorodsky District
- Founded: 1775
- Elevation: 165 m (541 ft)

Population (2010 Census)
  - Total: 2,875
  - Estimate (2025): 2,103 (−26.9%)
- Time zone: UTC+3 (MSK)
- Postal code: 612470
- OKTMO ID: 33606151051

Bogorodskoye (Russian: Богородское) is an urban locality (an urban-type settlement) in Bogorodsky District of Kirov Oblast, Russia. Population: 2,875 (2010 census); 3,221 (2002 census); 3,731 (1989 Soviet census).
