= Bogorodsky District, Kirov Oblast =

Bogorodsky District Богородский район (Russian)
- District
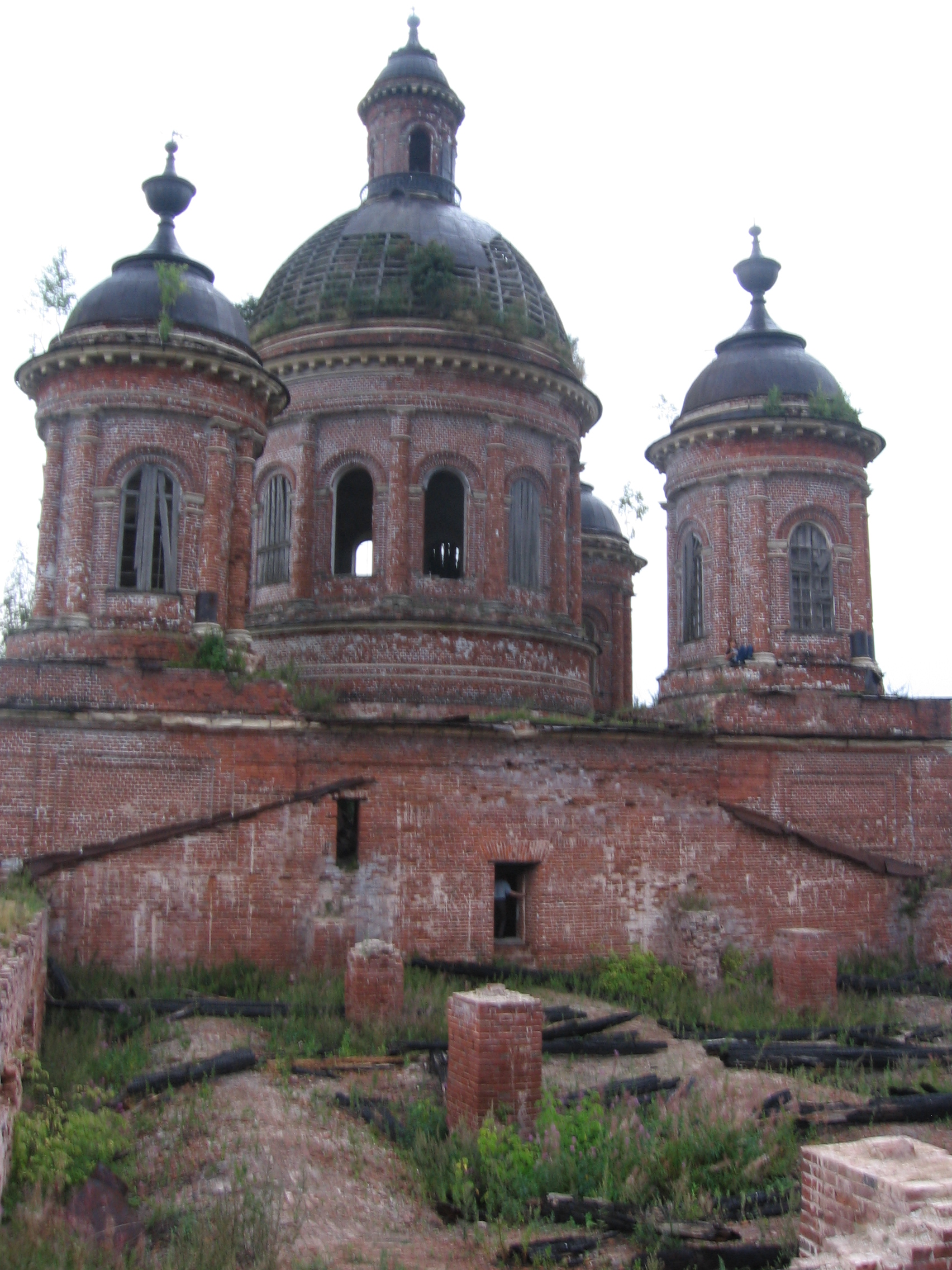
- Church of the Intercession of the Theotokos in Uhtym (1847-1867), Bogorodsky District

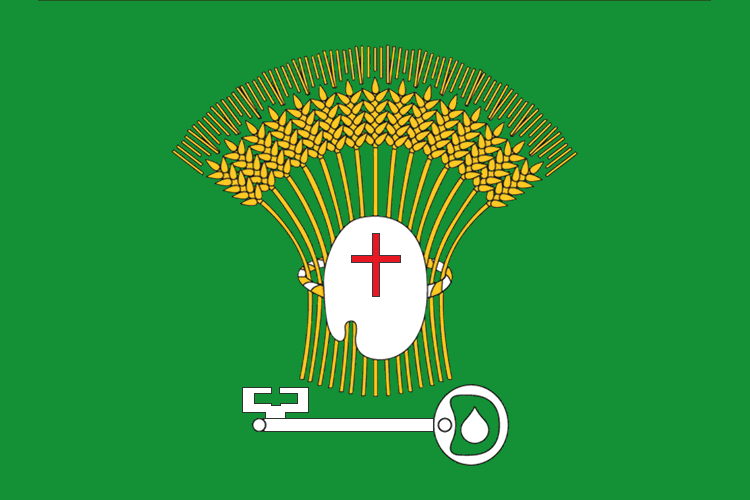
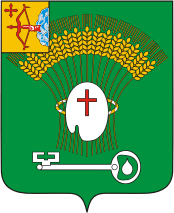
- Flag Coat of arms
- Location of Bogorodsky District in Kirov Oblast
- Coordinates: 57°50′06″N 50°44′58″E
- Country: Russia
- Federal subject: Kirov Oblast
- Established: 29 July 1929
- Administrative center: Bogorodskoye

Area
  - Total: 1,443 km^{2} (557 sq mi)

Population (2010 Census)
  - Total: 5,015
  - Density: 3.475/km^{2} (9.001/sq mi)
  - Urban: 57.3%
  - Rural: 42.7%

Administrative structure
  - Administrative divisions: 1 Urban-type settlements, 1 Rural okrugs
  - Inhabited localities: 1 urban-type settlements, 20 rural localities

Municipal structure
  - Municipally incorporated as: Bogorodsky Municipal District
  - Municipal divisions: 1 urban settlements, 1 rural settlements
- Time zone: UTC+3 (MSK)
- OKTMO ID: 33606000
- Website: http://www.bogorodskoe.vyatka.ru/

Bogorodsky District (Russian: Богоро́дский райо́н) is an administrative and municipal district (raion), one of the thirty-nine in Kirov Oblast, Russia. It is located in the southeastern central part of the oblast. The area of the district is 1,443 square kilometers (557 sq mi). Its administrative center is the urban locality (an urban-type settlement) of Bogorodskoye. Population: 5,015 (2010 census); 6,805 (2002 Census); 8,696 (1989 Soviet census). The population of Bogorodskoye accounts for 57.3% of the district's total population.
