= Stanitsa =

Village on Cossack military bases

A stanitsa or stanitza (/stə.ˈniːt.sə/, stə-NEET-sə; Russian: станица [stɐˈnʲitsə]; Belarusian: станіца [staˈnʲitsa]), also spelled stanytsia (Ukrainian: станиця [stɐˈnɪtsʲɐ]), was a historical administrative unit of a Cossack host, a type of Cossack polity that existed in the Russian Empire.

== Etymology ==
The Russian word is the diminutive of the word stan (стан), which means "station" or "police district". It is distantly related to the Sanskrit word sthāna (स्थान), which means "station", "locality", or "district".

== Structure ==
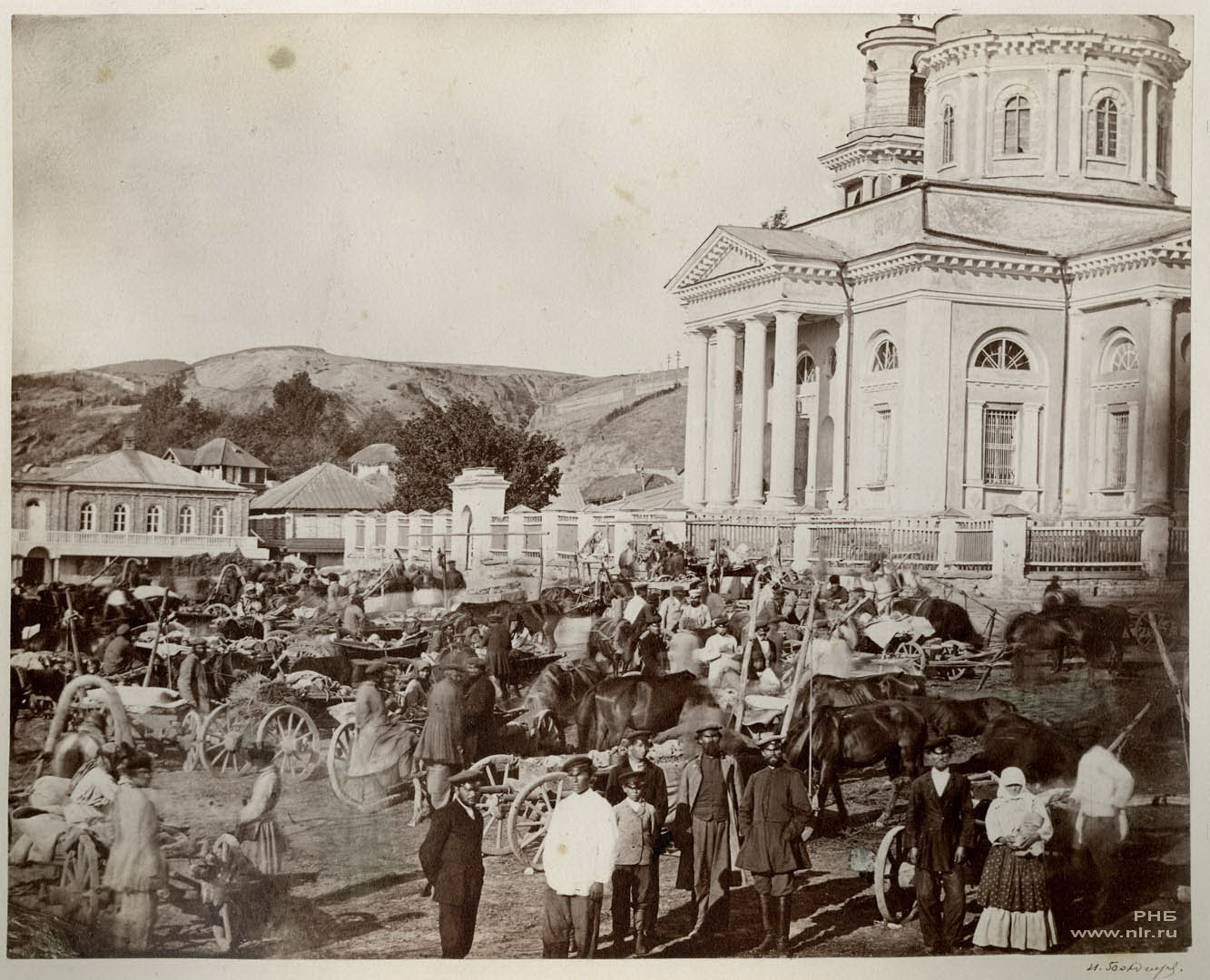
Market in Tsimlyanskaya stanitsa, Don Host Oblast (near present day Tsimlyansk), 1875-76

The stanitsa was a unit of economic and political organisation of the Cossack peoples who lived in the Russian Empire. Each stanitsa contained several villages and khutirs.

An assembly of landowners governed each stanitsa community. This assembly distributed land, oversaw institutions like schools, and elected a stanitsa administration and court. The stanitsa administration consisted of an Ataman, a collection of legislators, and a treasurer. The stanitsa court made judgements regarding "petty criminal and civil suits".

All inhabitants, except for non-Cossacks, were considered members of the stanitsa. Non-Cossacks were required to pay a fee to use the local land owned by the stanitsa.

== History ==
=== In the Russian Empire ===
The stanitsa was first an administrative unit in the 18th century. In the late 18th century, when the Cossack peoples largely lost their autonomy within the empire, they still kept self-governance at the level of the stanitsa; each stanitsa was still allowed to elect its own assembly.

=== In Italy ===
During the existence of Kosakenland the entity had various third level administrative divisions called "Stanitsa" and ruled by marshals or local atamans in an autonomous manner.

=== Destruction ===
In the aftermath of the 1917 October Revolution in Russia, a new Soviet regime took power. Beginning in 1919, the Soviet regime pursued a policy of genocide and systematic repression against Cossacks known as De-Cossackization. The policy aimed at the elimination of the Cossacks as a distinct collectivity by exterminating the Cossack elite, coercing all other Cossacks into compliance and eliminating Cossack distinctness. As part of this policy, the Soviet forces sought to erase Cossack administrative structures, especially of the Don Cossacks. The purpose of this was to "deny Cossacks any Don structure as a point of identification and to 'dilute' the Cossack population by appending portions of neighboring non-Cossack provinces". This included distinctly Cossack names for administrative units, as the Cossacks were fond of these names "as markers of their distinctiveness from peasants." The Soviets sought to erase these identities. On 20 April 1919, the Red Army's Southern Front issued an order renaming the stanitsas to generic volosts, or counties. Local revolutionary committees assisted in this, passing resolutions in parallel to destroy the stanitsa as a social unit. The Internet Encyclopedia of Ukraine lists the specific end date of the existence of the traditional stanitsa as 1920.

Later in the Soviet Union, the term stanitsa was used after 1929 to refer to rural settlements on former Cossack land that were governed by soviet councils.

=== Modern usage ===
Federal subjects of Russia in which stanitsas are a type of settlement

In modern Russia, the administration classifies a stanitsa as a type of rural locality in these federal subjects of Russia:

- Adygea
- Chechnya
- Dagestan
- Ingushetia
- Kabardino-Balkaria
- Karachay-Cherkessia
- Krasnodar Krai
- North Ossetia–Alania
- Novosibirsk Oblast
- Omsk Oblast
- Orenburg Oblast
- Rostov Oblast
- Stavropol Krai
- Sverdlovsk Oblast
- Volgograd Oblast

The most populous stanitsa in modern Russia is Kanevskaya in Krasnodar Krai (44,800 people in 2005). Formerly, the most populous stanitsa was Ordzhonikidzevskaya in Ingushetia (61,598 people in 2010), but in 2016 it was reorganized into the town Sunzha. The town Stanytsia Luhanska in Ukraine, originally founded by Cossacks, still has stanytsia in its name.

== Bibliography ==
- Holquist, Peter (1997). ""Conduct Merciless Mass Terror": Decossackization on the Don, 1919". Cahiers du Monde russe. 38 (1/2): 127–162. doi:10.3406/cmr.1997.2486. ISSN 1252-6576. JSTOR 20171035.
