= List of rural localities in Krasnodar Krai =

Map of Russia with Krasnodar Krai highlighted

This is a list of rural localities in Krasnodar Krai. Krasnodar Krai (Russian: Краснода́рский край, romanized: Krasnodarsky kray, IPA: [krəsnɐˈdarskʲɪj kraj]) is a federal subject of Russia (a krai), located in the North Caucasus region in Southern Russia and administratively a part of the Southern Federal District. Its administrative center is the city of Krasnodar. The third most-populous federal subject, the krai had a population of 5,226,647 as of the 2010 Census.

== Abinsky District ==
Rural localities in Abinsky District:

- Kholmskaya

== Adlersky City District ==
Rural localities in Adlersky City District:

- Estosadok
- Vesyoloye

== Anapa Urban Okrug ==
Rural localities in Anapa Urban Okrug:

- Gaikodzor
- Vityazevo

== Anapsky District ==
Rural localities in Anapsky District:

- Sukko

== Apsheronsky District ==
Rural localities in Apsheronsky District:

- Mezmay

== Beloglinsky District ==
Rural localities in Beloglinsky District:

- Belaya Glina

== Belorechensky District ==
Rural localities in Belorechensky District:

- Ryazanskaya

== Bryukhovetsky District ==
Rural localities in Bryukhovetsky District:

- Bryukhovetskaya

== Dinskoy District ==
Rural localities in Dinskoy District:

- Dinskaya

== Gelendzhik ==
Rural localities in Gelendzhik urban okrug:

- Arkhipo-Osipovka

== Goryachy Klyuch ==
Rural localities in Goryachy Klyuch urban okrug:

- Molkin
- Saratovskaya

== Kalininsky District ==
Rural localities in Kalininsky District:

- Kalininskaya

== Kanevskoy District ==
Rural localities in Kanevskoy District:

- Kanevskaya

== Kavkazsky District ==
Rural localities in Kavkazsky District:

- Kavkazskaya
- Kazanskaya
- Temizhbekskaya

== Korenovsky District ==
Rural localities in Korenovsky District:

- Platnirovskaya

== Krasnoarmeysky District ==
Rural localities in Krasnoarmeysky District:

- Poltavskaya

== Krylovsky District ==
Rural localities in Krylovsky District:

- Krylovskaya

== Kushchyovsky District ==
Rural localities in Kushchyovsky District:

- Kushchyovskaya
- Shkurinskaya

== Leningradsky District ==
Rural localities in Leningradsky District:

- Leningradskaya

== Mostovsky District ==
Rural localities in Mostovsky District:

- Kostromskaya

== Novokubansky District ==
Rural localities in Novokubansky District:

- Besskorbnaya
- Sovetskaya

== Novopokrovsky District ==
Rural localities in Novopokrovsky District:

- Kalnibolotskaya
- Novopokrovskaya

== Novorossiysk ==
Rural localities in Novorossiysk urban okrug:

- Abrau-Dyurso

== Otradnensky District ==
Rural localities in Otradnensky District:

- Otradnaya

== Pavlovsky District ==
Rural localities in Pavlovsky District:

- Pavlovskaya

== Seversky District ==
Rural localities in Seversky District:

- 8 Marta
- Severskaya

== Shcherbinovsky District ==
Rural localities in Shcherbinovsky District:

- Staroshcherbinovskaya

== Starominsky District ==
Rural localities in Starominsky District:

- Starominskaya

== Tbilissky District ==
Rural localities in Tbilissky District:

- Tbilisskaya

== Temryuksky District ==
Rural localities in Temryuksky District:

- Fontalovskaya
- Sennoy
- Starotitarovskaya
- Taman
- Vyshestebliyevskaya

== Tikhoretsky District ==
Rural localities in Tikhoretsky District:

- Kirpichny

== Timashyovsky District ==
Rural localities in Timashyovsky District:

- Medvedovskaya

== Uspensky District ==
Rural localities in Uspensky District:

- Konokovo
- Uspenskoye

== Ust-Labinsky District ==
Rural localities in Ust-Labinsky District:

- Ladozhskaya

== Vyselkovsky District ==
Rural localities in Vyselkovsky District:

- Vyselki

== Yeysky District ==
Rural localities in Yeysky District:

- Dolzhanskaya

== See also ==
- Lists of rural localities in Russia
