= Starominsky =

Starominsky (masculine), Starominskaya (feminine), or Starominskoye (neuter) may refer to:

- Starominsky District, a district of Krasnodar Krai, Russia
- Starominskaya, a rural locality (a stanitsa) in Starominsky District of Krasnodar Krai, Russia
