= Tbilissky =

Tbilissky (masculine), Tbilisskaya (feminine), or Tbilisskoye (neuter) may refer to:

- Tbilissky District, a district of Krasnodar Krai, Russia
- Tbilisskaya, a rural locality (a stanitsa) in Krasnodar Krai, Russia
