= Aidamir Achmiz =

Aydamir Achmiz
- Born: 23 March 1912; Bolshoy Kichmay, Sochi Okrug, Black Sea Governorate, Russian Empire
- Died: 2 December 1942 (aged 30) Novkus-Artezian, Ordzhonikidze Krai, Russian SFSR, Soviet Union
- Allegiance: Soviet Union
- Branch: Red Army (Artillery)
- Service years: 1942
- Rank: Guards Private
- Unit: 2nd Guards Separate Horse-Artillery Battalion; 10th Guards Cossack Cavalry Division; 4th Guards Cossack Cavalry Corps
- Commands: Artillery loader
- Conflicts: World War II: Battle of the Caucasus
- Awards: Hero of the Soviet Union; Order of Lenin; Order of the Patriotic War 2nd class

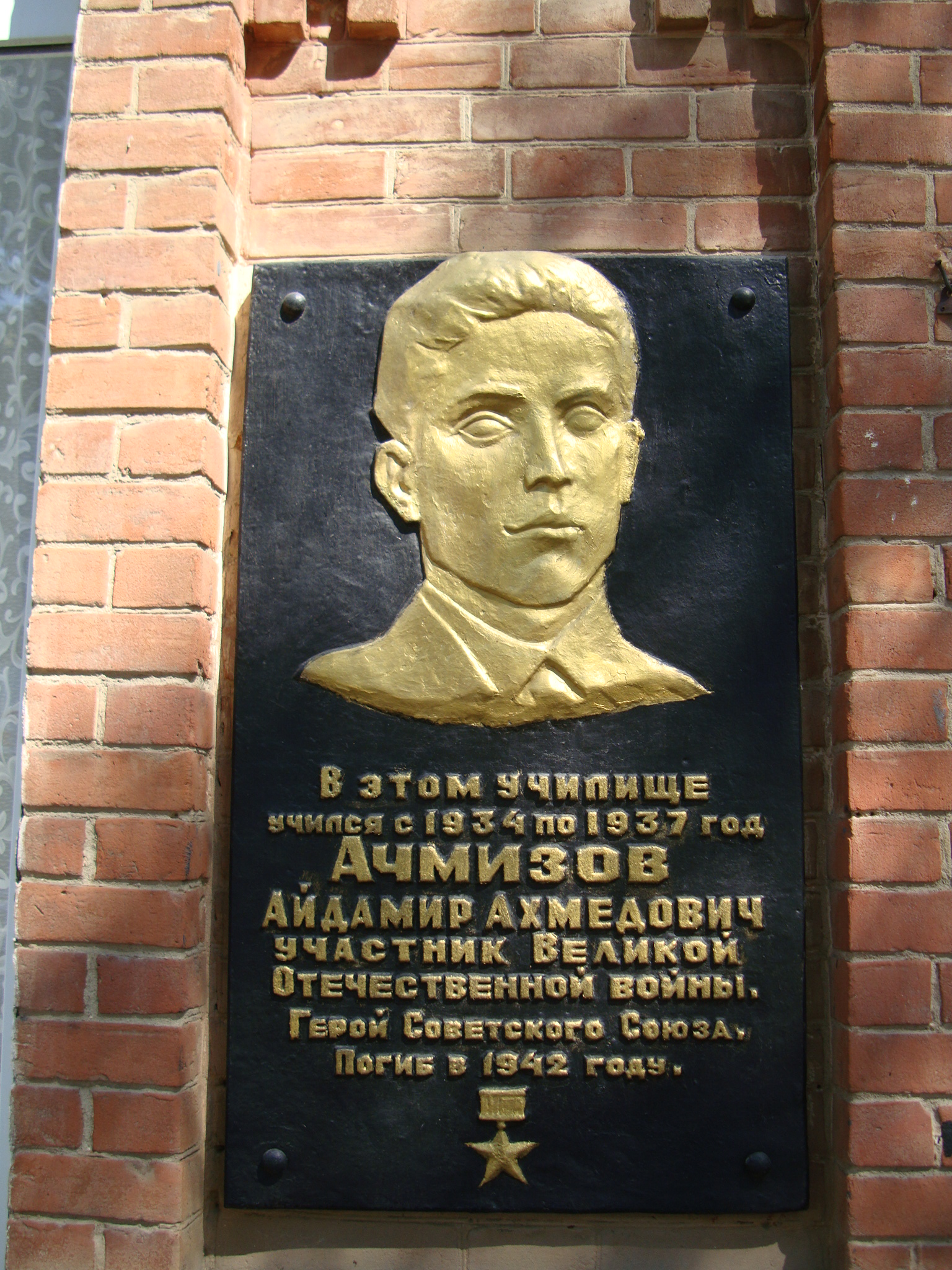
Aydamir Akhmedovich Achmizov. Memorial plaque on the Maykop Pedagogical College.

Aydamir Achmiz (Adyghe: Ацумыжъу Ахьмэт ыкъо Айдэмыр; Russian: Айдамир Ахмедович Ачмизов; 23 March 1912 – 2 December 1942) was a Red Army Guards Private, an artillery loader in the 2nd Guards Separate Horse-Artillery Battalion of the 10th Guards Cossack Cavalry Division (4th Guards Cossack Cavalry Corps, Transcaucasian Front), and a posthumous Hero of the Soviet Union.

== Biography ==
Aydamir Achmizov was born on 23 March 1912 in the aul of Bolshoy Kichmay (now in the Lazarevsky City District of Sochi, Krasnodar Krai) to a peasant family. He was of Circassian (Shapsug) ethnicity (related to Yanal Ashmoz) and a member of the All-Union Communist Party (Bolsheviks). He graduated from the Adyghe Pedagogical School in 1937 and later from the Krasnodar Pedagogical Institute via correspondence. Before the war, he worked as a geography teacher and the director of a middle school in the aul of Bolshoy Pseushkho, and as the director of the Krasnoaleksandrovskaya secondary school in the Tuapsinsky District.

He volunteered for the Red Army in February 1942 through the Shapsug district military commissariat and was sent to the front. He served as an artillery loader in the 2nd Battery of the 267th (later renamed 2nd Guards) Separate Horse-Artillery Battalion within the 4th Guards Volunteer Cossack Cavalry Corps. Achmizov demonstrated exceptional courage during his very first fierce engagements with German forces in August 1942 near the stanitsas of Shkurinskaya, Kushchevskaya, and Novo-Alekseevskaya, as well as the aul of Koshekhabl. For his actions in these battles, he was awarded the Order of the Patriotic War 2nd class.

== Heroism ==
Guards Private Achmizov distinguished himself in combat near the aul of Novkus-Artezian (now in the Neftekumsky District of Stavropol Krai).

On the night of 1 December 1942, guardsmen of the 36th Cossack Cavalry Regiment, supported by the 2nd Battery where Achmizov served, launched a surprise attack that drove the fascist forces out of Novkus-Artezian and took control of the strategic Budyonnovsk–Mozdok road. Refusing to accept the loss of this key position, the enemy launched continuous counterattacks the following morning.

On 2 December 1942, while repelling a tank attack, almost his entire artillery crew was incapacitated. Loader Achmizov took over the gunner's position. Alongside his wounded crew commander, he engaged in a direct duel against eleven enemy tanks. With highly accurate fire, he destroyed two heavy and three medium tanks. The brave artilleryman was killed in this action, but the enemy tanks failed to break through the Soviet defensive lines.

He was buried in the aul of Novkus-Artezian.

By a decree of the Presidium of the Supreme Soviet of the USSR on 31 March 1943, for the "exemplary performance of combat assignments of the command on the front of the struggle against the German invaders and the courage and heroism displayed," Guards Cossack Aydamir Akhmedovich Achmizov was posthumously awarded the title of Hero of the Soviet Union. He became the first soldier in the 4th Guards Cossack Cavalry Corps to receive this title.

== Awards ==
- Hero of the Soviet Union (31 March 1943)
- Order of Lenin (31 March 1943)
- Order of the Patriotic War 2nd class (6 February 1943)

== Memorials ==
- His name is engraved in gold letters in the Hall of Glory at the Central Museum of the Great Patriotic War in Victory Park, Moscow.
- A memorial tombstone was erected at his grave in Novkus-Artezian in 1962.
- The school in the aul of Bolshoy Kichmay is named after him, and a bust of the Hero was installed in its courtyard in 1963.
- A bas-relief is installed at the educational institution in the aul of Khadzhiko, where he worked as a director for several months before the war.
- An obelisk stands in front of the secondary school in Krasno-Aleksandrovsky (Lazarevsky District), where Achmizov was a teacher and director.
- A commemorative plaque is installed on the building of the Adyghe Pedagogical School in Maykop.
- A bust of Achmizov is installed in Novkus-Artezian, Neftekumsky District.
- A memorial bas-relief with his portrait and a brief description of his feat is placed at the entrance to the Neftekumsky District administration building.
- By a military decree, Achmizov was permanently added to the honorary muster roll of his battery, remaining listed alongside the unit he fought with.

== See also ==
- List of Heroes of the Soviet Union

== Bibliography ==
- Shkadov, Ivan (1987). Герои Советского Союза: Краткий биографический словарь [Heroes of the Soviet Union: A Brief Biographical Dictionary] (in Russian). Vol. 1. Moscow: Voenizdat.
- Sidzhakh, Khazretbiy (2005). "Ачмизов Айдамир Ахмедович [Achmizov Aydamir Akhmedovich]". Твои Герои, Адыгея: очерки о Героях Советского Союза [Your Heroes, Adygea: Essays on Heroes of the Soviet Union] (in Russian). Maykop: Adyghe Republican Book Publishing House. pp. 22–29. ISBN 5-7608-0459-6.
- Tyulenev, I. V., ed. (1975). Герои битвы за Кавказ [Heroes of the Battle for the Caucasus] (in Russian). Tskhinvali: Iryston.
- Aparin, N. G. (1980). Золотые Звёзды Адыгеи [Gold Stars of Adygea] (in Russian) (2nd ed.). Krasnodar.
