= 8 Marta =

8 Marta may refer to:

- 8 Marta, Krasnodar Krai, rural locality in Krasnodar Krai, Russia
- 8 Marta, Novosibirsk Oblast, rural locality in Novosibirsk Oblast, Russia
