= Mikhail Shkabardnya =

Russian politician (1930–2025)

- Михаил Шкабардня

Member of the Soviet of the Union
- In office 1979–1989

Personal details
- Born: Mikhail Sergeyevich Shkabardnya; 18 July 1930; Tbilisskaya, North Caucasus Krai, Russian SFSR, USSR
- Died: 28 January 2025 (aged 94)
- Political party: CPSU
- Education: Novocherkassk Polytechnic Institute
- Occupation: Engineer

Mikhail Sergeyevich Shkabardnya (Russian: Михаил Сергеевич Шкабардня; 18 July 1930 – 28 January 2025) was a Russian politician. A member of the Communist Party of the Soviet Union, he served in the Soviet of the Union from 1979 to 1989.

Shkabardnya died on 28 January 2025, at the age of 94.
