= Ivan Suchkov =

Soviet pilot

Ivan Afanasevich Suchkov
- Иван Афанасьевич Сучков
- Born: 17 August 1923; Besskorbnaya, RSFSR
- Died: 2 August 1981 (aged 57); Kaluga, USSR
- Military career
- Allegiance: Soviet Union
- Branch: Soviet Air Force
- Service years: 1941 – 1956
- Rank: Lieutenant Colonel
- Conflicts: Korean War
- Awards: Order of the Red Banner (3)

Ivan Afanasevich Suchkov (Russian: Иван Афанасьевич Сучков; 17 August 1923 – 2 August 1981) was a Soviet flight instructor and fighter pilot who was credited as a flying ace with 10 shootdowns in the Korean War.

== Early life ==
Suchkov was born on 17 August 1923 to a Russian family in Besskorbnaya. Having completed his eight grade of school in 1940, he went on to enter the military in 1941 and became a cadet at the Krasnodar Military Aviation School of Pilots. Hen then trained at the Konotop Military Aviation School of Pilots, which he graduated from with the rank of junior lieutenant in 1943 before being assigned to the 20th Reserve Aviation Regiment as a flight instructor. In December 1945 he was transferred to the 49th Separate Transport Aviation Regiment, where he served as a flight instructor until being sent to teach at the Stalingrad Military Aviation School of Pilots, and in 1950 he was promoted to the position of flight commander and made a military pilot 1st class; earlier that year he was reassigned to the 176th Guards Fighter Aviation Regiment. He did not see combat before the Korean War. In November 1950 the regiment was sent to China, having been sent to the Russian Far East earlier that year.

== Korean War ==
Before entering combat in April 1951, Suchkov helped train other pilots in his regiment. There he was appointed deputy commander of flight in the 3rd squadron. Having made his first sortie on 3 April 1951, he was soon credited with his first shootdown on 7 April - a B-29. He then was shot down another B-29 on 12 April, but then went several months without any credited aerial victories until 9 September despite having been promoted to squadron commander in July. In that aerial battle that day he and Grigory Ges each shot down one F-86 according to Soviet records, but America documents did not confirm losses from that incident. On 12 September he was credited with shooting down two F-80s; the Soviets claimed to have shot down 11 F-80 and F-84 aircraft that day. US records indicate the loss of only one F-84, but Korean War historian Diego Zampini estimated that at least three American F-84s were lost that day, with two of the losses being recorded several days later. Aviation historian Igor Seidov says that the two aircraft Suchkov shot down on 12 September were probably F-84E No.51-666 and F-84E No. 51-663. Having earned the title of ace, he continued to fly in combat, and on 4 November his colleagues witnessed him shoot down an F-84. The Soviets claimed to have shot down three other F-84s that day, but only one F-84 was recorded as lost. Four days later he claimed another aerial victory, which was listed as an F-84 by Soviet documents; however, American records and historians indicate that it was probably an F-80. After being credited with his last three aerial victories in December, he gained a possible victory on 12 January 1952, although ground units were not able to provide any sort of confirmation. He was withdrawn from the Korean War in February 1952 and nominated for the title Hero of the Soviet Union, but he did not receive the title. During the war he flew an estimated 120 sorties and engaged in 50 aerial battles. Most Russian historians credit him with 10 aerial victories, but some Western sources credit him with 12.

== Postwar ==
After the Korean War Suchkov became the deputy commander of his combat regiment, and in 1954 he was promoted to regimental commander, but in 1955 he became the deputy chief of staff of the 324th Air Defense Administration. Later that year he went on to hold the same position in the 78th Fighter Aviation Corps, but he retired and entered the reserve in 1956. He died in Kaluga on 2 August 1981 at the age of 57.

== Awards ==
- Three Order of the Red Banner (2 June 1951, 10 October 1951, and 22 February 1955)
- Two Order of the Red Star (29 April 1954 and 20 December 1956)
- Three Medal "For Military Merit" (23 February 1945, 18 August 1945, and 17 May 1951)
