= Ladoga =

Ladoga may refer to:

== Lakes ==
- Lake Ladoga, the largest lake in Europe

== Vehicles ==
- Ladoga APC, a Russian armoured personnel carrier
- TVRS-44 Ladoga, a Russian regional airliner

== Places ==
Russia

- Novaya Ladoga ("New Ladoga"), a town in Leningrad Oblast
- Staraya Ladoga ("Old Ladoga"), a village in Leningrad Oblast

United States

- Ladoga, California, an unincorporated community
- Ladoga, Indiana, a town
- Ladoga, Michigan, an unincorporated community
- Ladoga, Wisconsin, an unincorporated community

== See also ==
- Ladozhsky (disambiguation)
