= 30th Guards Army Corps =

30th Guards Rifle Corps (1943–1957) 30th Guards Army Corps (1957–1998)
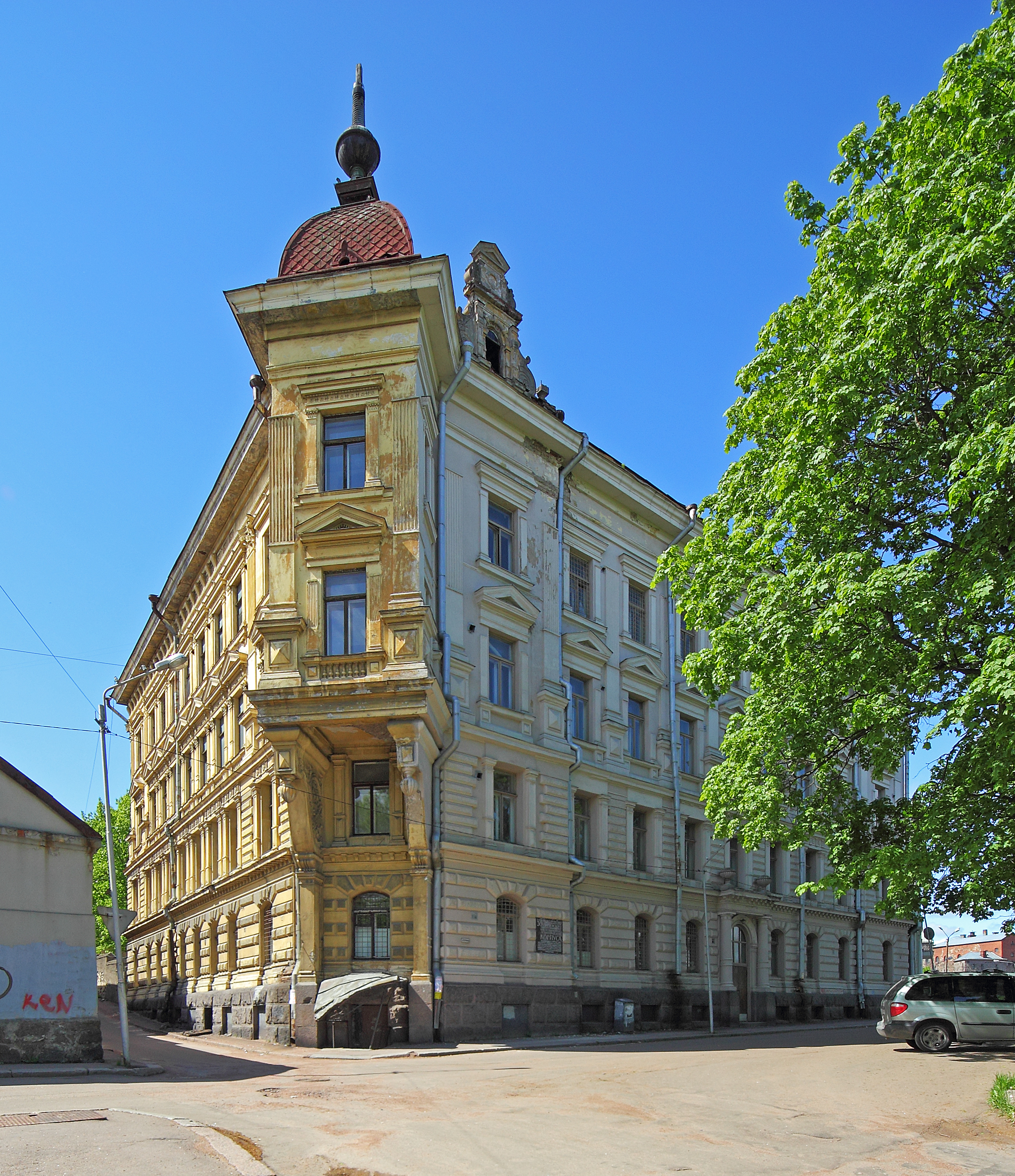
- Hackman Apartment Building, Vyborg, corps headquarters 1945-97.
- Active: 1943–1998
- Country: Soviet Union
- Branch: Soviet Army
- Type: Infantry
- Garrison/HQ: Vyborg
- Engagements: Second World War: Siege of Leningrad; Leningrad-Novgorod Offensive; Vyborg-Petrozavodsk Offensive; Narva Offensive; Tallinn Offensive; Courland Pocket
- Decorations: Order of the Red Banner
- Battle honours: Leningrad

Commanders
- Notable commanders: Nikolai Simoniak; Mikhail Panov

The 30th Guards Leningrad Army Corps (Russian: 30 Гвардейского армейского общевойскового Краснознамённого Ленинградского корпуса) was an army corps of the Soviet Ground Forces. As part of the Red Army on the Eastern Front of World War II it was designated the 30th Guards Rifle Corps.

It was formed in April 1943 on the basis of three guards rifle divisions, which had distinguished themselves in battle to break through the siege of Leningrad – the 45th, 63rd and 64th (the last came from the Volkhov Front). So the corps was a Guards unit from the first day of its formation. N. P. Simonyak, who had received for Operation Spark the title of Hero of the Soviet Union, was appointed as commander.

Until the second week of February 1944, the two armies of the Leningrad Front had deployed only vanguard elements while attempting to force entry into Estonia. Army General Leonid A. Govorov of Leningrad Front ordered the 2nd Shock Army to break through the German defence line north and south of Narva town, move the front fifty kilometres westwards and continue towards the town of Rakvere. The artillery of the 2nd Shock army opened fire on all German positions on 11 February, continuing the Battle for Narva Bridgehead. The 30th Guards Rifle Corps joined the Soviet units attempting to seize the Auvere station. The guards riflemen widened the bridgehead to ten kilometres along the front. The remains of the German 227th and 170th Infantry Divisions retreated. General Major Romantsov ordered an assault at Auvere settlement by the Air Force and artillery on 13 February, with the 64th Guard Rifle Division seizing the village in a surprise attack. Half a kilometre westward from Auvere station, the 191st Guard Rifle Regiment cut through the railway two kilometres from the Tallinn highway, which was the last way out for Army Group Narwa, but was repelled by the 170th Infantry Division and the 502nd Heavy Panzer Battalion.

The corps was deployed during the postwar period on the Karelian Isthmus with the headquarters in the city of Vyborg (Leningrad Military District).

In 1988 the corps was reported to consist of the 45th Guards Motor Rifle Division, the 64th Guards Motor Rifle Division, and the 37th Motor Rifle Division (a mobilisation division, the double of the 63rd Motor Rifle Training Division) at Chernaya Rechka. The 8th Guards Gun Artillery Regiment (8-й гвардейский пушечный артиллерийский полк) and the 807th Reactive (MRL) Artillery Regiments were at Kamenka, the 970th Anti-Tank Artillery Regiment at Vyborg, and the 93rd Independent Helicopter Squadron was located at Kasimovo Airfield on the Karelian Isthmus.

After the disbandment of the 111th Motor Rifle Division the remnant 20th Motor Rifle Brigade joined the corps.

The corps was disbanded in 1998.
