= Nikolai Simoniak =

Nikolai Pavlovich Simoniak
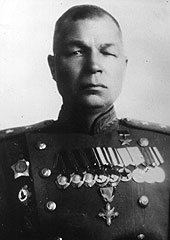
- Born: Николай Павлович Симоняк; 17 February 1901; Berezovka, Poltava Governorate, Russian Empire
- Died: 19 April 1956 (aged 55); Leningrad, Soviet Union
- Burial place: Leningrad
- Military career
- Allegiance: USSR
- Branch: Infantry
- Service years: 1918–1948
- Rank: Lieutenant General
- Commands: 8th Rifle Brigade; 136th Rifle Division; 63rd Guards Rifle Division; 30th Guards Rifle Corps; 67th Army; 3rd Shock Army
- Conflicts: Russian Civil War; World War II; Winter War; Eastern Front; Battle of Hanko Peninsula; Siege of Leningrad; Leningrad-Novgorod Offensive; Vyborg–Petrozavodsk Offensive; Baltic Offensive; East Pomeranian Offensive; Battle of Seelow heights; Vistula–Oder Offensive; Battle of Berlin
- Awards: Hero of the Soviet Union; Order of Lenin (3); Order of the Red Banner (3); Order of Suvorov, 1st Class; Order of Suvorov, 2nd Class; Order of Kutuzov, 1st Class; Order of the Red Star

Nikolai Pavlovich Simoniak (Russian: Николай Павлович Симоняк, February 17 [O.S. February 4] 1901 – April 23, 1956) was a General in the Soviet Army during World War II.

== Early life and Russian Civil War ==
Simoniak was born to Ukrainian parents on 17 February 1901 in the stanitsa of Temizhbekskaya, Caucasus Detachment of, Kuban Oblast. He was conscripted into the Red Army on 1 May 1918 and sent to the 154th Derbent Revolutionary Rifle Regiment of the 11th Army, which became the 292nd Derbent Rifle Regiment of the 33rd Kuban Rifle Division in Astrakhan in February 1919. With the regiment, Simoniak fought on the Kuban steppe and the Astrakhan steppe against the Armed Forces of South Russia. In early 1920 he was sent to study at the 6th Ryazan Cavalry Courses, and from there in June as part of a cadet squadron was transferred to the 18th Samara Preparatory Cavalry Courses. After graduating from the latter, Simoniak was sent to study at the 10th Novocherkassk Command Courses. As part of a cadet detachment, he participated in the suppression of anti-Soviet forces.

== Interwar period ==
After graduating from the courses, Simoniak was sent to the 83rd Cavalry Regiment of the 14th Maykop Cavalry Division in December 1922, in which he served as a squad leader, assistant platoon commander, platoon commander, and acting squadron commander. From January to June 1924 he commanded a platoon of the divisional school, then returned to the 83rd Regiment. In September 1924 the regiment was renumbered as the 59th Cavalry Regiment while the division became the 10th Cavalry Division, and Simoniak continued to serve with it as a platoon commander, assistant squadron commander, assistant chief of the regimental school, and commander and political officer of a squadron. Between November 1928 and October 1929 he was retrained at the Cavalry Officers Improvement Course at Novocherkassk, and in February 1929 was appointed a riding instructor at the Frunze Military Academy, which he became a student of in April 1932.

Upon graduating from the academy in May 1935 he was appointed to the staff of the 30th Cavalry Division of the Leningrad Military District, serving as chief of the 2nd section and then the 1st (operational) section from September 1937. In January 1938 he became deputy chief of the Control Group under the district military council, being awarded the Order of the Red Star a month later. Placed at the disposal of the Personnel Directorate between April and July, he was then appointed deputy chief of the 1st department of the Personnel Directorate. In September he returned to the control group under the Leningrad Military District military council and served as deputy chief and acting chief of the group. In this position, he participated in the Winter War. In September 1940, Simoniak, by then a colonel, became senior assistant inspector of infantry of the district, and in December became commander of the 8th Separate Rifle Brigade, stationed at the Hanko Naval Base.

== World War II ==
After the beginning of Operation Barbarossa on 22 June 1941, Simoniak led the brigade in the defense of Hanko until December, when it was evacuated to Leningrad and subordinated to the Leningrad Front commander. In March the brigade was used to form the 136th Rifle Division, of which Simoniak, then a major general, continued in command of. As part of the 23rd and later the 55th Armies the division fought in the Sinyavino Offensive, in fierce fighting to expand a bridgehead on the eastern bank of the Tosna River. In January 1943 it fought in Operation Iskra a part of the 67th Army, an attempt to relieve the Siege of Leningrad. The 136th launched the main attack of the army on 12 January and at 11:45 on 18 January linked up with elements of the 18th Rifle Division of the 2nd Shock Army to create a corridor to the besieged city. For its actions, the 136th was converted into the 63rd Guards Rifle Division, while Simoniak was made a Hero of the Soviet Union on 10 February.

As a result of his performance, Simoniak advanced to command the 30th Guards Rifle Corps, fighting in the direction of Mga and Sinyavino, in March 1943. In January 1944, the corps fought in the Krasnoye Selo–Ropsha Offensive, then in the battles to capture Narva. Simoniak was promoted to lieutenant general on 22 February. In July as part of the 21st Army the corps fought in the Vyborg–Petrozavodsk Offensive, then in September joined the 2nd Shock Army for the Tallinn Offensive. In October Simoniak was appointed commander of the 3rd Shock Army, which fought in the blockade of the Courland Pocket, the Warsaw–Poznan Offensive, and the East Pomeranian Offensive. On 16 March Simoniak was replaced and transferred to command the 67th Army, responsible for the defense of the coastline of the Gulf of Riga.

== Postwar ==
After the end of the war, Simoniak commanded the army until its disbandment, returning to command of the 30th Guards Rifle Corps in November 1945. On 28 September 1948 he was dismissed from service due to illness. Simoniak died on 23 April 1956 in Leningrad.

== Honours and awards ==
- Gold Star Medal (№ 558) Hero of the Soviet Union (10 February 1943)
- Three Order of Lenin (2 February 1942, 10 February 1943, and 21 February 1945)
- Three Order of the Red Banner (22 February 1938, 3 November 1944, and 1948)
- Order of Suvorov (1st class - 22 June 1944; 2nd class - 21 February 1944)
- Order of Kutuzov 1st class (5 October 1944)
- Order of the Red Star (1940)
- Medal "For the Defence of Leningrad"
- Medal "For the Defence of the Soviet Transarctic"
- Medal "For the Victory over Germany in the Great Patriotic War 1941–1945"
- Medal "For the Capture of Berlin"
- Jubilee Medal "XX Years of the Workers' and Peasants' Red Army"
- Jubilee Medal "30 Years of the Soviet Army and Navy"
