= Kasimovo Airfield =

Kasimovo
- IATA: none; ICAO: none

Summary
- Airport type: Military, disused
- Operator: Soviet Ground Forces
- Location: St Petersburg
- Elevation AMSL: 230 ft / 70 m
- Coordinates: 60°11′54″N 030°20′6″E
- Interactive map of Kasimovo

Runways
Direction	Length		Surface
Direction	ft	m	Surface
16/34	6,562	2,000	Asphalt

Kasimovo is a former air base in Leningrad Oblast, Russia located 30 km north of Saint Petersburg. It is an abandoned military airfield.

It was home to the 93rd independent Helicopter Squadron of the 30th Guards Army Corps from the 1960s to 1993.

Google Earth imagery shows that a road intersects the runway.
