= Kushchyovskaya massacre =

Mass killing in Kushchyovskaya, Krasnodar Krai, Russia

- Location: 46.5749°N 39.6666°E; Kushchyovskaya, Krasnodar Krai, Russia
- Date: 4 November 2010
- Attack type: Stabbing, strangulation
- Weapons: carbon monoxide, Nerve agent, Tranquillizer gun
- Deaths: 12

The Kushchyovskaya massacre, carried out on 4 November 2010, was the murder of 12 people including four children in the village of Kushchyovskaya, Krasnodar Krai of southern Russia. The ethnic Tatar family of wealthy local farmer Server Ametov was targeted and stabbed to death, together with visiting friends and a bystander. The mass murder shocked Russia and highlighted links between criminals and corrupt officials, as the perpetrators were members of a gang who had received protection from the authorities and operated with impunity for years.

Sergei Tsapok, the convicted gang leader and mastermind of the murders, died in prison following a stroke on July 6, 2014. Three of his accomplices had recently committed suicide, the most recent two days prior.

== Legacy ==
The case was the subject of several documentaries aired in Russia. It also inspired the 2013 TV series Станица (Stanitsa, The Village), a fictitious story loosely based on the events leading to the murder in Kushchyovskaya.

In an article for OpenDemocracy, Grigorii Golosov wrote that the massacre ran contradictory to a perceived propaganda program led by Vladimir Putin to portray Yeltsin's government as allowing crime to run rampant through the country in contrary to Putin's leadership (sometimes referred to as the wild nineties). Golosov noted that the heavy publicity the murders received had tarnished Putin's image.

== See also ==
- GTA gang
- Ivashevka massacre
- Inessa Tarverdieva
- Russian mafia
