= 8 Marta, Krasnodar Krai =

8 Marta 8 Марта
- Settlement
- Location within Krasnodar Krai Location within Russia
- Coordinates: 44°53′12″N 38°40′32″E
- Country: Russia
- Region: Krasnodar Krai
- District: Seversky District
- Time zone: UTC+03:00

8 Marta (Russian: 8 Ма́рта) is a rural locality (a settlement) in Severskoye Rural Settlement of Seversky District, Russia. The population was 48 as of 2010.

== Streets ==
- Stepnaya

== Geography ==
8 Marta is located 8 km north of Severskaya (the district's administrative centre) by road. Severskaya is the nearest rural locality.
