= GTA gang =

Gang of murderers and terrorists in Russia

- банда ГТА
- Founded: March 2012
- Founded by: Ibaydullo Subkhanov (alias Rustam Usmanov)
- Named after: Grand Theft Auto video game series
- Founding location: Udelnaya, Moscow Oblast, Russia
- Years active: 2012–2017
- Territory: Active on the motor roads around Moscow
- Ethnicity: Central Asian, predominantly Tajik and Uzbek
- Membership: 8–16
- Criminal activities: Terrorism, murder, robbery, weapons manufacturing and trafficking
- Allies: ISIL and Hizb ut-Tahrir

The "GTA gang" (Russian: банда ГТА, romanized: banda GTA) was the nickname given to a violent gang of murderers and terrorists located near Moscow, Russia, that robbed and murdered occupants of automobiles traveling on the Federal Automobile Road M-4 after stopping them using homemade caltrops. The Russian media dubbed them the "GTA gang" because of the similarity between their violent robberies and the actions of characters in the Grand Theft Auto video game series.

Formed in March 2012 by Ibaydullo Subkhanov to train soldiers for the Islamic State of Iraq and the Levant (ISIL), the gang was ultimately apprehended after a gunfight with police in the village of Udelnaya, near Moscow, on 6 November 2014, during which the gang members were captured and Subkhanov was killed. The gang was responsible for seventeen murders and two serious injuries in Moscow Oblast and Kaluga Oblasts, over the course of two and a half years.

== Membership ==
=== Leader ===
Ibaydullo Subkhanov (also known as Rustam Usmanov) is an Uzbek and a citizen of Osh, Kan. He arrived in Russia in 2004 and moved in with an older woman named Barakt Khasanova at a staff house in Udelnaya. Later, a younger woman named Ranohon Khasanova, who was his unofficial wife, also moved in, accompanied by two daughters from previous relationships. Ranohon Khasanova and her children disappeared on the night of the firefight on 6 November, and are still wanted internationally.

Subkhanov became a radical Islamist in 2011, and later fought for the Islamic State of Iraq and the Levant (ISIL) in the Syrian Civil War. When Subkhanov returned to Russia, he met some Tajiks who were members of an extremist pan-Islamic organisation Hizb ut-Tahrir. Later, Subkhanov worked as a house/villa servant for a top official in the federal office of the Prosecutor General of Russia, Alexei Staroverov, who had owned the villa since 2010. Subkhanov's mother reportedly also worked in the official's home. Subkhanov was killed by a police sniper during a gunfight on 6 November 2014 at the age of 32.

== Timeline of events ==
=== Early activity ===
The gang was founded by Kyrgyz national Ibaydullo Subkhanov in Udelnaya in March 2012. Believing a revolution would soon take place in Uzbekistan, Subkhanov, operating under the alias Rustam Usmanov, established a self-proclaimed jamaat (gathering) in order to train soldiers for ISIL. As a form of training, Subkhanov would take new members along with him on missions during which they were forced to murder victims as a way of proving their dedication to the cause.

In September 2013, a motorist was killed along the M9 highway. The following month, another man was killed near the town of Istra, and in December, the bodies of four men were discovered in a cabin north of the capital, all suffering from gunshot wounds.

Late into the night of 2 May 2014, an elderly couple, Anatoly and Tatyana Lebedev, were ambushed and killed along the road. The only item reported stolen was an iPad, even though a wallet was clearly visible on the dashboard.

On 30 June 2014, Alexei Tsyganov, a 53-year-old man from Tula Oblast, was found shot dead 25 m (82 ft) from his car 45 km (28 mi) from Moscow.

On 18 August 2014, the tenth victim of the gang's activities, 31-year-old Albert Yusupov, was found dead along the A-108 motorway. He had called a friend about a burst tire hours before his body was found. The story attracted widespread attention in the media, as all of the victims were killed with 9mm bullets, and their vehicles had been damaged by homemade caltrops.

=== Media speculation ===
The Russian media reported on several theories concerning the gang's origins. Some expressed the belief that the killers were satanists because of the black, crucifix-shaped caltrops used in the attacks.

Vladimir Zhirinovsky, leader of the Liberal Democratic Party, theorised the gangsters were Ukrainian nationalists, attempting subversive tactics against the Russian state.

Well known psychologist Mikhail Vinogradov, who worked in the police force during the Soviet era, suggested, after studying photos and videos of the gang leader and two gang members from surveillance cameras, that the gang was composed of experienced professionals from special forces, or former members of some other authority.

=== Vigilante response ===
The Russian media also began warning travellers about the gang in the summer of 2014, comparing their violent robberies to the actions of characters in the Grand Theft Auto video game series. Police agencies issued warnings to travellers, advising them not to stop until they reached a police road post or petrol station. Vigilante citizens, outraged by a lack of action from police and other authorities, soon organised armed patrols and started night raids in the areas south of Moscow, checking suspicious cars in an effort to stop the gang.

After warning citizens not to interfere with law enforcement operations, police eventually issued a computer-generated image of a suspect in mid-September 2014. A variety of methods were used by police and other authorities to find the gang, including tracking the stolen iPad signal, and switching off traffic lights.

On 6 November 2014, police raided an estate on Gor'kov Street in Udelnaya, killing Subkhanov and arresting nine other gang members. News agencies reported that the gang had been captured after a fierce gunfight around 3:00 a.m-3:20 a.m. in a private villa ( 55.6250354°N 38.0257228°E ) situated at Gor'kov street, 39, in the village of Udelnaya, Ramensky District, 10 to 15 km (6.2 to 9.3 mi) south-east of Moscow. Subkhanov was killed by a police sniper after reportedly initiating the gunfight by throwing a hand grenade towards the police and a Federal Security Service (FSB) special team after shouting Allahu Akbar (God is the greatest).

== Aftermath ==
Around 60 assorted weapons were found after the gunfire ended and a fire was controlled by firefighters. Most of the firearms were gas pistols (a non-lethal weapon for self-defence) remade to fire live bullets from standard 9mm ammunition rounds. All of these pistols had stickers with numbers. Experts found that one of these pistols was used in six murders.

Another 10 people were captured in other places in the Moscow Oblast. On 6 November the main group of the GTA gang was captured at the Dmitrovskoe Highway, north of Moscow. Two Kalashnikov sub-machine guns (AKS type) with 100 rounds were confiscated. Some gang members were on the run until 16 November.

List of suspects (Surname, First Name) - seven-eight males, two-three females (according to different sources):

Males: Absmatov Rashid, Okhunov Nematjohn, Rakhimov Abnunakhob, Ibragimov Dierbek, Akhmadjonov Alerbek, Sultanov Tolibjohn, Mamadchonov Abdumukim, Fazalitdin Khasanov. Khazratkhion Dodokhoev and Zafarjohn Guljamov were arrested later

Females: Sultanova Khosiyat, Sultanova Markhabo, Chekushina Maria (Russian citizen, later released as the wife of another labour migrant, not connected with the gang).

Later, two other people were arrested in Tajikistan by local police. The main ideologist of the gang, Bair Gulomov, who is the uncle of fellow gang member Zafarjohn Guljamov, was arrested around November 2015. ISIL recruiter, 38 year old Farrukh Azamjohn was reported arrested on 28 June 2016. As of June 2016, the Russian authorities were still in consultation with authorities in Tajikistan about having both suspects dealt with under Russian justice.

In August 2017, it was reported that another four members fled internationally and have yet to be located. In the same month, three members died in an attempt to flee court custody.

Ranohon Khasanova, Subkhanov's unofficial wife, and her two daughters disappeared on the night of the firefight on 6 November and are still wanted internationally.

=== President's congratulations ===
Russian President Vladimir Putin personally congratulated the Minister of Internal Affairs Vladimir Kolokol'cev for a successful investigation against the gang. Putin mentioned that the gang's actions can be described as a terrorist crime. He also applauded the cooperation between the police and the FSB during the investigation and said, "I hope you will get it (investigation) to the end."

== ISIL connected terrorist group ==
The information about the GTA gang and their connection with ISIL was later leaked to Russian mass media, in Arabic-language news, and abroad. The gang leader, Subkhanov, was probably previously personally connected with ISIL, and kept contact with ISIL after his participation in the Syrian war. He received assistance from the main ideologist of the gang, Bair Gulomov from Tajikistan. Gulomov found and encouraged newcomers. Meanwhile, the war-experienced Subkhanov, who trained and ruled over the other GTA gang members, planned and executed most assaults with at least one newcomer to the gang taken along for an "entrance exam".

The gang members, mainly Tajiks and Uzbeks by ethnicity and citizens of Tajikistan, Uzbekistan and Kyrgyzstan, and labour migrants mainly working as unofficial illegal taxi drivers, called themselves jaamat. They were on a mission to hunt down infidels on the motor roads as a fast and efficient way of training future ISIL fighters.

A few kilos of RDX (Hexogen) explosives were found in the GTA gang's hiding places which indicated that the jaamat was ready to commit an act of terror in the future.

== Motive ==
On 12 November the head representative of the Investigative Committee of Russia (IC or SK in Russian) Vladimir Markin said that news reports that the gang members acted like the heroes of the computer game GTA were unfounded, maintaining the gang's motivation was robbery. He did not specify when and how much money they took. These discrepancies in the gang's motives were widely discussed in Russia and abroad, but not in official mainstream media in Russia. There was mention in an article in which the connection between labour migrants' hate towards Russian citizens and their eager willingness to serve ISIL was discussed. This was caused by migrants' low and unstable salaries, slave-like working conditions and their unprotected, semi-official half-illegal lives in Russia.

== Top functionary from the Prosecutor Office involved ==
Alexei Staroverov, head of the Prosecutor General of Russia Office administration, was suspended temporarily while an internal investigation is carried out. This was confirmed by his office 12 November 2014. One day later, the head of IC Markin confirmed that Staroverov was being questioned by IC as a witness regarding the GTA gang. The criminal case concerning the illegal possession of weapons and ammunition found in his villa (article 222, Criminal Code of Russia) was initiated against him on 13 November.

He and his wife's income combined was more than 48 million rubles, but the 273 m^{2} (2,940 ft^{2}) villa itself and the land around it 1,110 m^{2} (1,330 yd^{2}), officially belonged to their underage son, a typical way to hide capital and real estate. It was purchased in 2010. Deputy Prosecutor General Viktor Grin had briskly intervened, issuing a personal order to close the criminal case against Alexei Staroverov as a harsh move in a long-running conflict between the Russian Investigative Committee and Prosecutor General's Office. Alexey Staroverov became ill and was hospitalised with heart problems around 20 November. He had also asked to resign. The head of the Cardiology Department where Staroverov spent some time recovering was Dr. Konstantin Lyadov, who was also included on the list of witnesses questioned about the GTA gang by IC. Lyadov owns a villa at the village of Pozdnyakovo, in the Krasnogorsk district, where another member of the GTA gang, Fazalitdin Khasanov (a brother of the gang leader's wife) made weapons (including remaking gas pistols) and caltrops for his friends. Russian opposition activist Alexei Navalny used the GTA gang connection to Staroverov to blame the corrupt prosecutors with cover-up of ISIL terrorists in his famous anti-corruption video called Chaika (which means "gull" in Russian) after the acting Prosecutor General of Russia Yury Chaika.

== Official report ==
The SK/IC failed to provide any kind of list of stolen valuables which are supposed to have been the reason for the murders. On 21 October 2015, the leader of the Russian IC, Markin, gave an interview to TV channel Russia 24 in which he said again that the aim of the gang was purely to obtain money and valuables. He did not mention any amount of money or say what valuable property had been taken.

He also said that the 17 victims were killed and that four more gang members had disappeared abroad, were listed internationally as wanted, and were still being searched for.

A few previous murders which occurred in 2009 in Moscow (but not on the highway) and in November–December 2013 in the Ryazan region were found to be connected with the GTA gang and are now under investigation.

On 28 June 2016, the criminal case was moved to the Moscow Oblast high court.

== Trial ==
On 6 July 2016 the Moscow Oblast court settled the preliminary hearing date for 13 July; some news leaked into media.

The preliminary hearing began on 13 July in a closed session and the next session date was set for 19 July. All video and photo recording was banned in the first session at the request of the accused. Court personnel checked the public and media to prevent mobile camera recording. Three prosecutors acted for the state. Some of the defense lawyers reported that they had insufficient time to read all 170 volumes of material relating to the case. Because of this, Judge Natalia Valikova verified the identities of accused and decided to move all other actions to the next session on 1 August 2016.

The nine defendants listened to the accusations read by the state prosecuting attorney during the session of 1 August. The formal accusations took more than two hours to read aloud. The gang members, their cars, and their home addresses were detailed. The list of weapons took about 10 minutes to read (two Kalashnikov different caliber submachine guns were mentioned, one TT pistol and numerous self-made pistols were named, but no information on hand grenades was given). The 15 criminal incidents were mentioned, some of which were previously unknown to the media. The first two victims, killed in 2012, were revealed to be guest-workers from abroad working as illegal taxi drivers, personally known to the perpetrators, who were killed by the gang to obtain their cars. A homicide with no robbery having taken place was also described. In it, Vladimir Kirillyuk, the head of the supervisory council from Flora-Moskva private bank, was killed bicycling on a side-road one night in 2014. The investigators suspected that he was killed because he had witnessed something dangerous to the gang members, although what he had seen was not mentioned. All of the defendants partially admitted their guilt, but decided to give their statements later during each criminal episode's hearing.

The next hearing was settled on 8 August, then the 19th and the 24th. A long break then followed, caused by a defendants' lawyer's vacations.

Several hearings went on throughout October. In the hearing on 31 October, Anvar Ulugmuradov gave his statements about one homicide and one homicide attempt, involving victims who were completely unknown to the gang; there was no robbery attempted. The crime was committed on the night of 11–12 June 2013 in a car parked in a forest/park near Mendeleevo settlement, Moscow Oblast. Ulugmuradov gave a confession during the investigation that the leader of the gang forced him to kill absolutely unknown persons for training purposes. The leader said that the revolution would soon start in Uzbekistan, and that gang members, as future militants, should prove their commitment and dedication to the gang and to the underground by killing somebody. But Ulugmuradov denied his own confession about the purpose of the murders during the court session. He confirmed that with a yet unknown gang member "Kirgiz" they found a car in which laughter and music could be heard. The man and woman in the car were intended to be killed inside the car, shot point-blank the windows using a pistol with a self-made suppressor in a form of a plastic bottle. But 38-year-old Yulia Baranova managed to survive after two wounds (breast and shoulder) that rendered her unconscious. She called her friends after she regained consciousness in the morning and they called the police. She repeated her statements at the hearings, saying that nothing had been stolen, and the purposes of the crime were non-lucrative.

=== Escape attempt after the trial session ===
Five GTA gang members tried to escape from custody in the elevator of the Moscow Oblast court on 1 August 2017, around 13:50 p.m. Moscow time, just after the trial session (which ended around 13:00 p.m.). Nine prisoners from the gang were divided into two groups after the trial. The first group of five men, accompanied by two guards, entered the elevator and moved down from the fourth floor where the session was held.

The first group of gang members then stopped the lift by either swinging and jumping in it or by pressing the STOP button. They proceeded to attack the two guards by suffocating the female guard from behind and cornering the male guard. Afterward, they stole the guards' pistols (PM pistols with 32 bullets) and keys for their handcuffs. The male guard managed to call on the radio and warn others in the building. Approximately half an hour later, the technicians in the building managed to remotely move the elevator to the upper floor where the other trial session had just ended.

The fugitives held the man as a hostage and beat and tortured the female guard, named Elizaveta Lukjanova, until she fell unconscious. They then waited for the elevator to move again.

The lift then stopped on the third floor, where three or four OMON officers, who happened to be on that floor were waiting for the fugitives. The firefight was quite long and, according to witnesses, more than 20 gunshots were fired.

A video of the firefight was published on 3 August 2017. Two policemen took position in the session hall with a lawyer hiding beside them using a chair as an improvised weapon. Viktor Ardabjevskiy, a prisoner from a different trial, and the former mayor of Miass city who was accused of contract murders, was still inside a bulletproof glass room and forced to stay and watch the firefight, which was merely 3 to 4 m (9.8 to 13.1 ft) away, through the glass. He is considered to be an important witness to the firefight. Three fugitives from the GTA gang were killed while two of them were seriously wounded. A video of their corpses was posted shortly after the firefight.

Against all prisoner convoy rules, the five dangerous criminals were guarded in the elevator by only two guards (regular criminals must be guarded by two per each, must not use the elevator, and would use one K9 unit, SWAT type units were but fortunately to another trial and shouted out in that courtroom°), the woman in her 40s and the man, 45 years old. Additionally, the prisoners had their hands cuffed in front of them instead of behind as they are supposed to be during the transfer of dangerous criminals. These facts provided grounds for conspiracy theories that the escape attempt was a plot by the authorities, who allegedly decided to kill the criminals by manipulating them into making an escape attempt.

°The court has new system where convoy area does not have any link to public area except courtrooms and get to courtroom as first and leave at last unless arrested or justified

=== Aftermath ===
Two police officers who guarded the fugitives in the elevator were rushed to the hospital with serious injuries, but no bullet wounds. One policeman, who encountered the armed fugitives after the elevator's doors were opened, was shot in the shoulder.

The three fugitives killed in the firefight were Abdumukim Mamadchonov, Mirzomavlon Mirzosharipov, and Kholik Subkhanov (the leader's brother). The two wounded were Khasanov and Gulyamov. The fourth fugitive died in the hospital on 2 August 2017. However, the information about the fourth death has not yet been confirmed.

== Court proceedings – trial results ==
Moscow Oblast court finished proceedings and declared the judgment about GTA gang case 9 August 2018.

Four main perpetrators: Sherozdon Kodirov, Khazratkhon Dodokhonov, Umar Khasanov and Anvar Ulugmuradov were found guilty and got life sentence in prison, the fifth bandit Zafardjon Gulyamov found guilty and got 20 years of prison in a maximum security facility.

Numerous relatives of these convicts attended the final trial and many of them are interconnected with other relatives (because the gang members prefer to marry each other sisters while living and working in Moscow). Nearly all perpetrators were originally from Tajik city Isfara but the gang leader and his brother were from nearby Kirgiz city Osh. Relatives, interviewed by media after the trial, tried to excuse their related gang members, stressing their moral quality as initially high but "corrupted by Moscow society". Some articles in Russian media mentioned that many relatives already managed to receive Russian citizenship.

== See also ==
- Inessa Tarverdieva
- Ivashevka massacre
- Kushchyovskaya massacre
