= Kushchyovskaya Air Base =

Airport in Krasnodar Krai, Russia

Kushchyovskaya Kushchovskaya Kushevskaya
- Кущёвская
- Kushchyovskaya, Krasnodar Krai in Russia
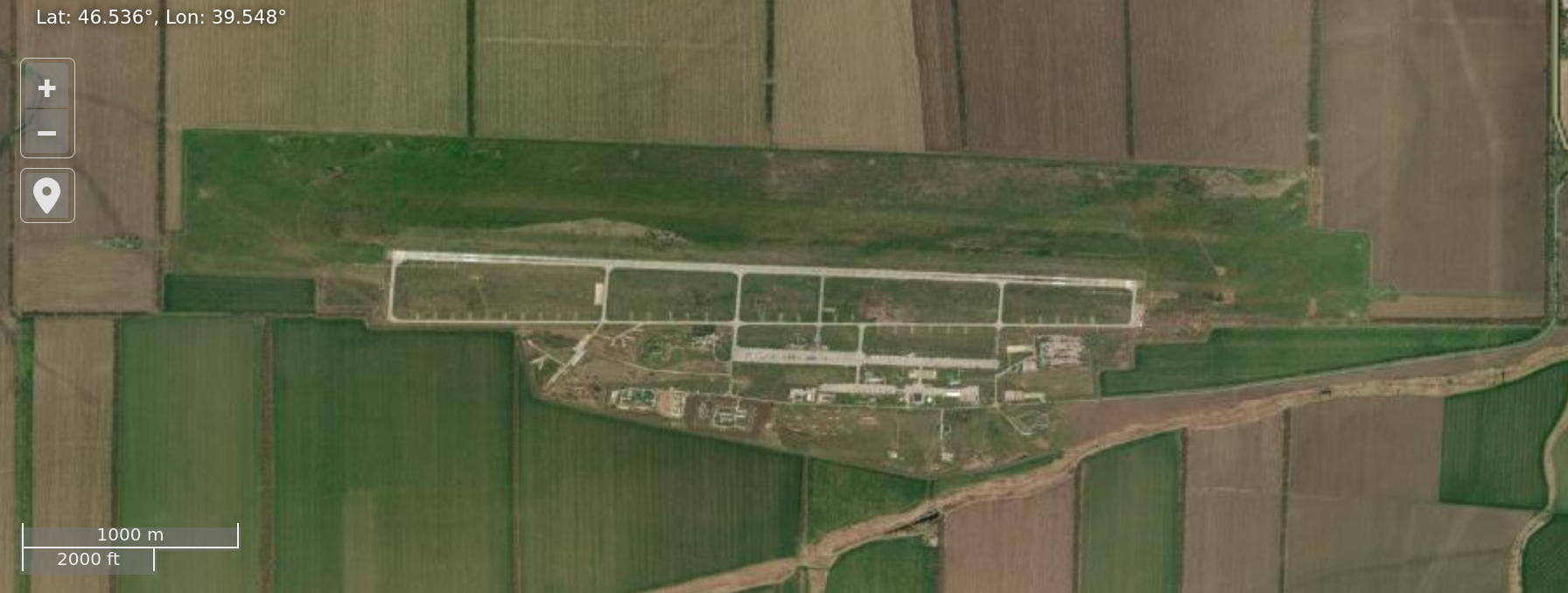
- Satellite imagery of Kushchyovskaya air base

Site information
- Type: Air Base
- Owner: Ministry of Defence
- Operator: Russian Aerospace Forces

Location
- Shown within Krasnodar Krai Kushchyovskaya (Russia)
- Coordinates: 46°32′11″N 39°32′54″E

Site history
- Built: 1952
- In use: 1952 - present

Airfield information
- Identifiers: ICAO: URRD
- Elevation: 38 metres (125 ft) AMSL
Runways
| Direction | Length and surface |
|---|---|
| 09/27 | 2,805 metres (9,203 ft) Concrete |

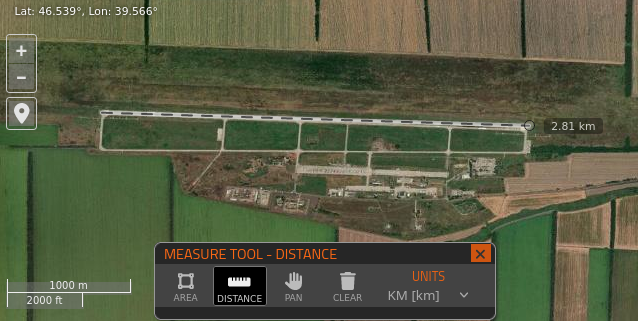
NASA's FIRMS shows runway 09/27 extended to just over 2.80 km

Kushchyovskaya is an airbase of the Russian Aerospace Forces located at Kushchyovskaya, Krasnodar Krai, Russia.

The base is home to the 797th Training Aviation Regiment.

== See also ==
- List of military airbases in Russia
