= Ivashevka massacre =

2016 massacre in Russia

- Location: Ivashevka, Samara Oblast, Russia
- Date: 24 April 2016
- Weapons: sticks, bats
- Deaths: 6
- Injuries: 1
- Perpetrators: 4

The Ivashevka massacre (Russian: Ма́ссовое уби́йство в Ива́шевке) involved the murder of six members of a family and the critical wounding of a seventh on the night of 24 April 2016 in the village of Ivashevka, Syzransky District, Samara Oblast.

The victims included Colonel Andrey Gosht (Russian: Андрей Гошт), the deputy head of police HQ in Samara Oblast and former head of the Syzran town police from 2013–2015, his wife, his mother and father, his sister-in-law and her daughter. Another niece, 7 years old, survived despite extensive injuries and a long coma.

== Preliminary evaluation ==
Andrey Gosht's brother Evgeniy came home around 7:30 on the morning after the attack (after working a night shift), found the bodies, and called for an ambulance. The victims were severely beaten with sticks and the body of Andrey Gosht had some signs of torture as if he had been interrogated by killers. Police soon found that the video-recording server for CCTV cameras around the house was stolen by the killers but three cameras under the roof had separate (internal) recording devices. A number of strange facts made the case a lot more suspicious: Andrey Gosht had hired a security to guard the house and his family while he was working in Samara city but released the guard whenever he was at home himself (as he had been that Sunday); furthermore, the family had a guard dog which had been poisoned just a week before.

== Investigation ==
The police announced a reward of 3 million rubles for assistance leading to the identification of the perpetrator.

The local police for the Samara region stated that the purpose of the crime was robbery.

The SK / IC spokesman informed the media that they had three main versions of the crime but could not reveal them because of the investigation's secrecy.

The first three suspects, Azerbaijani citizens, were arrested during the night of 1 May, and on 2 May they were transferred to Syzran. They made confessions and were charged with murder and robbery on 4 May

The suspects lived in the little villages of Shigony (Шигоны) and Kushnikovo (34 km from the crime scene) and in the town of Syzran.

1. Roman Fataliev (23 years old) — from Azerbaijan, lived in the village Shigony, officially unemployed, but worked unofficially on the construction sites (He had the criminal record during his school time - two years on probation for racketeering, assault and battery).
2. Islam Babaev (21 years old) — from Azerbaijan, lived in Syzran, worked with his brother as a builder on construction sites.
3. Orhan Zohrabov — from Azerbaijan, lived in Shigony, studied in polytechnical college. (He had the criminal record - three years in prison for stealing sheep.)).
4. Makhmadali Akhmadov (24 years old), Tajik (married a local woman whom he converted to Islam, they have a common child), lived in Kushnikovo.

The last suspect Akhamadov managed to escape to his homeland Tajikistan through Kazakhstan one day before the other three suspects were arrested. According to the Investigative Committee, he was arrested at Domodedovo International Airport when he took a flight from his home city Dushanbe.). Samara region police chief Sergey Solodovnikov, however, claimed that Akhmadov was arrested on 3 May on the border between Tajikistan and Afghanistan, and flown to Moscow while detained, and then to Syzran. Investigators concluded that he was the mastermind of the crime. Akhamadov told reporters in Syzran that he was not guilty. Akhmadov said that he was not guilty, had nothing to do with the crime, and was going to return to the Russian Federation to prove his innocence.

== Crime reconstruction ==
Investigators concluded that the gang had prepared for the theft or robbery in the village of Ivashevka, with Akhmadov as leader and organizer gathering sticks to use as weapons. They gathered on 23 April around 22:00 near the cafeteria in Syzran and drove to Ivashevka, changing two cars in the process. The criminals chose from two rich houses, selecting the one where the lights went off during the night. They left the car near the village club, went to the house through the field, entered the yard from the behind, and then the house through the open back door. The perpetrators killed all the people on the first floor, then those on the second floor. They left taking the video surveillance system with them. They took two mobile phones, a tablet and 900 rubles in Gosht's wallet. Then they drove to Ulyanovsk but stopped beside the river Tisherek, where they buried the video surveillance system and the bloody sticks. They stopped near the "Magnit" supermarket in Ulyanovsk where Fataliev tried to get money from a "Sberbank" ATM using Gosht's bank card, but failed because he did not know the PIN. The video from the ATM is one of the main pieces of evidence in the case.

== Alternative versions ==
Some experts have expressed doubts about the official version: how a robbery turned to the massacre. They point to the small value of the stolen items, the extreme cruelty of the crime and the elaborate preparations taken: the dog was poisoned months before, and the dogs in the neighboring houses were poisoned a few weeks before.

Investigator Telman Gdlyan has proposed that more experienced criminals, wanting to take revenge on a police officer, might have identified the house to the suspects, telling them that it contained more valuables, encouraging them to commit the crime.

Another former investigator (by the Procurator General of the Soviet Union in USSR times), now the lawyer Vladimir Kalinichenko thinks there is a parallel with the GTA gang's terror crimes and said: "at least the lack of property robbed tells me that the motives of the crime could be absolutely different. I have my own version. I know that during the last 10-15 years, especially in the Moscow region, in the flats and in the rural houses one can see the arrival of people of Caucasian ethnicity or from Middle Asia, they try to assimilate here, to live with weapons, try to propagate some literature. The news in the media just before these killings informed that one house of worship was discovered and captured by authorities nearby," "60 persons were detained". "They had explosives, weapons, extremist literature and so on in this house." "That's why I still have another version: crimes with quite different motivations today have just started to occur or are beginning to take place, there are no robberies involved here. We are talking about the destabilization of the situation on the territory of Russia through committing crimes like these. It has all been going on in the West too, for several years, and now it's flourishing".

== Political reactions ==
Political reactions followed from the moment the names, ethnicity, and citizenships of the suspects were revealed.

A senator from the Federation Council (Russia) Franc Klincevich made a very unusual and surprising political statement for the ruling party "United Russia" about the need for a strict visa regime toward former Soviet countries of "Middle Asia" (except Kazakhstan and Kyrgyzstan) and about the need to sharpen the requirements for receiving the citizenship of Russia. "Sadistic killing of Syzran ex-police chief with his family by migrants from Middle Asia - it's just already above the limit ... we all remember the terrible death of a Moscow child at the hands of a crazy babysitter from Uzbekistan". Klincevich said directly that we need to decide, what is more important: "Good relations with the former Soviet republics or the safety of the citizens of Russia?" Even the human rights advocates supported this idea.

Later, other politicians also gave support to the visa regime, taking into account the public reaction from the mass attack (with shooting) of migrants from Middle Asia against the North Caucasus ethnical gangs on the Khovanskoye Cemetery (south of Moscow) on 13 May 2016 (500 persons involved, 3 killed, 50 arrested). Another senator from Federation Council (Russia) and first Deputy of Defence and Security Committee, Evgeniy Serebrennikov, proposed enforcing the visa regime for countries including Tajikistan and Uzbekistan, in order to prevent such incidents.

== Court proceedings ==
The court proceedings started on 24 October 2016 in closed session, as requested by the son of the main victim. The suspects continued to maintain their innocence. Two of the suspects demanded a trial by jury.

The verdict was handed down on 22 February 2017: Makhmad Ali Akhmadov and Roman Fataliev were sentenced to life in prison; Islam Babaev to 25 years; and Ohran Zohrabov to 26 years. The next of kin were awarded damages of 12 million rubles from the killers. The son of Helmut Gosht insisted on being informed about the time then the convicts were sent to prison and when they were freed.

== See also ==
- Inessa Tarverdieva
- GTA gang
- Kushchyovskaya massacre
