= Anatoly Yermolin =

Russian politician (born 1960)

- Анатолий Ермолин

Member of the State Duma
- In office January 2003 – 24 December 2007

Personal details
- Born: Anatoly Aleksandrovich Yermolin; 7 April 1964 (age 62) Kushchyovskaya, Russia, Soviet Union
- Party: United Russia
- Anatoly Yermolin's voice Yermolin on the Echo of Moscow program, 8 October 2012

Anatoly Aleksandrovich Yermolin (Russian: Анатолий Александрович Ермолин; born on 7 April 1960), is a Russian politician, journalist and former army officer who served as a member of the State Duma of the fourth convocation. He has been the editor of the investigative department of The New Times magazine and the NewTimes.ru portal.

== Biography ==
Anatoly Yermolin was born on 7 April 1964 in Kushchevskaya, Krasnodar Krai, to the family of servicemen.

He graduated from the Moscow Higher Border Command Order of the October Revolution Red Banner School of the KGB of the USSR named after Mossovet in 1985.

Between 1985 and 1994 he served as an officer in the Vympel special forces unit, as a reserve Lieutenant Colonel. He took part in combat and special events in Afghanistan, the Transcaucasian republics of the Soviet Union and Russia, and worked as an inspector within the framework of the Intermediate-Range Nuclear Forces Treaty (INF Treaty) in Western Europe, was responsible for the anti-terrorist security of the provisional administrations in the republics of North Ossetia and Ingushetia as a commander of the anti-terrorism group. He was awarded five medals for military service. In 1989, he graduated Red Banner Institute of the KGB of the USSR named after Yu. V. Andropov, specializing as the officer with higher military-special education, and a translator and assistant in English and Spanish. He also completed additional training at the Youth Institute, Moscow State Open Pedagogical University named after M. A. Sholokhov, and Yale University School of Management. He is a candidate of Pedagogical Sciences.

He is one of the initiators of the revival of the scout movement in Russia. He took an active part in the development and implementation of innovative educational projects financed by the Yukos Oil Company: Podmoskovny Lyceum, New Civilization, Internet Education Federation. Administered all-Russian and international educational programs of a non-profit nature.

In January 2003, Yermolin became a member of parliament, a deputy of the State Duma, of the fourth convocation, elected on the list of the United Russia party. He is a member of the International Affairs Committee. In 2004, he was expelled from the United Russia faction for “violating parliamentary ethics.” He stated that the real reason for the expulsion was criticism of the political course of Vladimir Putin and his administration. The media associated his expulsion with the “YUKOS case.” After being expelled from the faction, he became an independent.

In 2005, he signed a manifesto on the creation of the United Civil Front, with party leader Garry Kasparov. In April 2007, he joined the Union of Right Forces. In November 2008, he became a member of the Right Cause party, as the Union of Right Forces became part of it. On 21 September 2011, he left the party along with a group of colleagues from the Union of Right Forces.

On September 21, 2011, he left the party along with a group of colleagues from the Union of Right Forces, just 6 days after Mikhail Prokhorov's removal as the party chairman. He has been a member of the Civil Initiatives Committee since its founding on 5 April 2012.

I got acquainted with this program, and it caused me a deep inner protest as a psychiatrist, because it distorted and distorted the important components that underlie the formation of a person and personality. That is, the main thing that defines the human essence, and this program is aimed at splitting and loss of unity from the point of view of depatriotism.

— Nikolay Govorin

== Social activities ==
Member of the Board of the Open Russia public organization, and since 2006, he has been the deputy chairman (de facto leader). Founder of the International Leadership School “League of Deeds”, honorary president of the Russian Association of Navigators/Scouts. Author of books for children and youth “Navigator of the 3rd Millennium”, “In the Service of Childhood”, “League of Deeds”, “How to Disenchant Zombies”. He was awarded the winner of the Russian Presidential Prize in Education in 2003.

He is a co-author of the model program “Modernization of the children’s movement of Zabaykalsky Krai”, presented in 2015. The program was criticized by ONF experts and representatives of the authorities of the Zabaykalsky Krai and caused heated discussion in the press and blogosphere.

The subject of criticism was primarily the idea of dividing students in the 9th grade into the “creative class”, “industrial proletariat”, “service class” and “industrial defects”.
