= Gang of Amazons =

Criminal gang in Russia

- Founder: Inessa Tarverdiyeva; Roman Podkopaev
- Years active: 2007–2013
- Territory: North Caucasian Federal District, Russia
- Ethnicity: Russian
- Membership: 4
- Activities: murder, robbery

The Gang of Amazons (Russian: Банда «амазонок», romanized: Banda "amazonok") is a family of serial killers from Stavropol, Russia, who committed a series of murders and robberies over a span of six years. Inessa Tarverdiyeva along with her husband Roman Podkopaev, 35, and two daughters Viktoria, 25, and Anastasiya, 13, began their murder spree in 2007, but some accounts detail offences as far back as 1998. Their spree lasted until their apprehension in 2013.

== Origin of name ==
The family was only dubbed the Gang of Amazons after the media discovered that a knife engraved with "My Favorite Amazon" was found not too far from the crime scene. The local media assumed that this was Inessa's knife, however, according to Igor Berezin, Deputy Head of the Investigation Department of Russia's Investigation Committee for Rostov Oblast, the knife belonged to a girl who had no affiliation with the gang or their crimes. The family has never used this name when referencing themselves.

== Members ==
The family lived in a comfortable home in the village of Divnoye in Stavropol, the administrative seat of the Stavropol Krai. The family used camping trips to the Rostov Oblast as a cover to commit their crimes.

- Roman Podkopaev (Russian: Роман Подкопаев), 35, patriarch of the family, was a registered dentist. He was the suspect in the mysterious death of Inessa's first husband and later went on to marry Inessa.
- Inessa Tarverdiyeva (Russian: Инесса Тарвердиева), 46, the matriarch of the family was a nursery school teacher and homemaker, but gave up being a teacher for their robbery and murder business. Had a profound hatred for the police after her lover, a policeman, left her for another woman. She was the founder of the gang.
- Viktoria Tarverdiyeva (Russian: Виктория Тарвердиева), 25, eldest daughter from Inessa's prior union with Azerbaijani man Arzu Tarverdiyev who died under mysterious circumstances at a power grid where he worked.
- Anastasiya Tarverdiyeva (Russian: Анастасия Тарвердиева), 13, the youngest member of the family and juvenile at the time of the murders
- Sergei Sinelnik (Russian: Сергей Синельник), 35, husband to Anastasiya Sinelnik and brother-in-law of Podkopaev. Was a police officer who provided inside information to the family to aid in the commission of their crimes.
- Anastasiya Sinelnik (Russian: Анастасия Синельник), 26, sister of Podkopaev, denies involvement in crimes committed by her relatives, however, was known to store goods stolen by the family.

== Killing spree ==
=== Mikhail Zlydnev ===
On 17 February 2008, in Aksai, bandits murdered Mikhail Zlydnev, head of the information security department of the State Drug Control Service, and his wife. They were shot in their home and then finished off with knives. The killers took a doublet, a jacket, and a television remote control from the victims' house.

=== Federal highway murder ===
On 17 July 2008, in the Aksai district on the federal highway, the gang members shot a car in which Rostovites Alexei Sazonov and Julia Vasilyeva were travelling. Sazonov was killed, and Vasilyeva was seriously wounded. The family stole a purse with a driver's licence and a passport.

=== Chudakov family ===
On 8 July 2009, the family overpowered and shot Lieutenant Colonel Dmitry Chudakov of Nizhny Novgorod, his wife and seven-year-old son with a Saiga .410 semi-automatic shotgun while they were parked on the shoulder of the road. Their 11-year-old daughter, Veronika, was stabbed 37 times. After the family murdered Chudakov's family, they made off with a laptop, hairdryer, and a camera, worth £950 in assets, leaving gold jewellery untouched. This became the family's most high-profile case. Alexei Serenko, from the nearby city of Aksay, was mistakenly accused of and spent two years in jail for the crime. The only evidence against him were the results of the ballistic examination. The expert of the Ministry of Justice had stated that the Chudakovs, as well as three other people in the vicinity, were killed by Serenko's carbine. Later it was shown that the findings of the examination were erroneous and Serenko was released from jail.

=== Teenage girls ===
In 2010, the family partook in another murder and robbery involving two teenage girls, one of whom was supposedly Tarverdiyeva's goddaughter. The family waited for their victims to return to home, knowing they had weapons and money, but when only the family's two daughters showed up Podkopaev and Tarverdiyeva ambushed them. The girls were tortured and had their eyes gouged out before they were murdered. While Inessa admits to killing adults, she claims she never killed children stating, "My husband shot them."

=== Novocherkassk murders ===
On 10 March 2009, on the outskirts of Novocherkassk, the family broke into a house and killed the two residents who lived there. They first shot them with the Saiga carbine and then finished them off with a knife. The family took passports, a laptop, a camera, women's boots, a doublet, and a man's jacket.

On 19 September 2012, in Novocherkassk, the family killed 26-year-old Vladimir Mandrik and 22-year-old Vasily Camforin, two employees of a private security company who responded to alarms going off at a local dental clinic. The family took the security guard's service weapons, which included a Kalashnikov assault rifle and two pistols.

On 29 November 2012, in Novocherkassk, the family infiltrated the home of Novocherkassk resident and taxi driver Vadim Lozhkov. The man attempted to pursue them but was killed using the guns stolen from the security guards.

On 16 March 2013, in Aksai, the family killed car inspector Nikolai Kutsekon, who left his apartment after hearing his car alarm go off. After seeing suspicious people near his car, he attempted to detain them but was shot and killed.

On 8 April 2013, on the outskirts of Novocherkassk, the family shot at a car of grocery store employees responding to alarms that were set off at their store. The wounded driver Nikolai Korsunov survived, however his partner, Yuri Statsenko, died later on at the hospital.

=== Andrei Yurin ===
On 24 April 2013 in the Aksai district, the family murdered 39-year-old police lieutenant Andrei Yurin, who was going out for a late-night drive. Yurin was shot at point-blank range shortly after leaving his home. The family attempted to break into the house, but the door was locked, so the family left without taking anything, saving Yurin's wife and child from his fate.

== Capture and arrest ==
On 8 September 2013, after shooting an unnamed couple, Podkopaev and Viktoria proceeded to rob the home of a former military officer in Aksai, Rostov Oblast. After finding no money, they proceeded to steal candles and alcohol from the home as well as drumsticks from the refrigerator. Both Podkopaev and Viktoria escaped via scooter but were stopped shortly after at an ID by patrol officer Ivan Shakhovoi. Instead of showing his documents, Podkopaev pulled out his weapons and opened fire, killing Shakhovoi. Podkopaev was killed shortly after the backup arrived. Officer Aleksey Lagoda, who was merely wounded, was able to radio for backup. Viktoria also made it out of the gunfight alive but was seriously wounded. Shortly after, Inessa and Anastasiya were captured by police at a campsite where they were guarding a large cache of weapons, including 20 firearms, silencers, grenades, and ammunition. Items stolen from victims were also discovered at the encampment, assisting Sledkom in linking the family to dozens of murders. The family saw their crimes like a day at the office. Tarverdiyeva, who also confessed to hating police, stated "I am a gangster by nature."

Arrested alongside the family were Podkopaev's sister, Anastasiya Sinelnik, 26, and her husband Sergei, 31, a former policeman. It is suspected that the couple aided the family in the commission of their crimes by providing them with inside information about police operations and officer movements. While Anastasiya would not openly admit to aiding and abetting the family in court, she would not admit to knowledge of the planning of the crimes. Her husband Sergei confessed to feeling pleased that his colleagues did not know who was committing the crimes, but that he did. The couple stored stolen goods in their home and occasionally took jewellery to a jeweller for sale or to be melted down into new jewellery.

== Investigation ==
The journalists of Novaya Gazeta conducted their own investigation into the circumstances of the detention of the gang members and in great detail - the circumstances of the death of the family of Dmitry Chudakov, which caused a great public outcry. According to journalists, the investigative authorities once again fabricated evidence, attributing to the gang of "Amazons" crimes that they did not commit [6]. At a preliminary hearing in the Rostov Regional Court, Dmitry Chudakov's mother Valentina Chudakova announced the Amazon gang was not involved in her son's murder and filed a motion to send the criminal case for an additional investigation.

According to the investigators, Inessa seemed to take pride in her crimes and see herself as an admirable hero. During the interrogations, she said that she killed the police officers out of personal hatred, and said that it was "a pity" that the gang could not kill more police officers before being arrested. She claimed that though she was present at all the murders, it was Podkopaev who actually committed them.

== Trials ==
=== First trial ===
In 2017, Inessa Tarverdieva was sentenced to 21 years in a general regime corrective labor colony, Viktoria Tarverdiyeva to 16 years in a general regime colony, Anastasiya Sinelnik to 19 years in a general regime colony, and Sergei Sinelnik to 20 years in a special regime colony. (Note: Special regime colonies (also known as very strict regime colonies) are the strictest security level in Russia's penal system.)

=== Second trial ===
In 2023, Inessa Tarverdieva was re-sentenced to 21 years in a general regime colony, Anastasiya Sinelnik to 25 years in a general regime colony, Viktoria Tarverdiyeva to 25 years in a general regime colony, Anastasiya Sinelnik to 24 years in a general regime colony, and Sergei Sinelnik to 25 years in a strict regime colony. (Note: In Russia, strict regime colonies are the next step down in security from special regime colonies.) On appeal by the prosecutors, Sergei Sinelnik was re-sentenced to life in a special regime colony.

=== Imprisonment ===
According to Komsomolskaya Pravda, Inessa Tarverdieva was sent to the IK-6 prison camp in Oryol Oblast.

== See also ==
- GTA gang
- Ivashevka massacre
- Kushchyovskaya massacre
- Sergei Zaripov's gang
- The Malyshev-Kultashev Gang
- List of Russian serial killers
