= Ladozhsky =

Ladozhsky (masculine), Ladozhskaya (feminine), or Ladozhskoye (neuter) may refer to:

- Ladozhsky Rail Terminal, a rail terminal in St. Petersburg, Russia
- Ladoga Canal (Ladozhsky Kanal), a water transport route in Leningrad Oblast, linking the Neva and the Svir Rivers
- Ladozhskaya, a village (stanitsa) in Krasnodar Krai, Russia
- Ladozhskoye, a village in Tver Oblast, Russia
- Ladozhsky Seal
