= Shkurinskaya =

Shkurinskaya Шкуринская
- Stanitsa
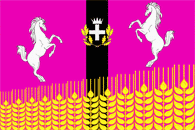
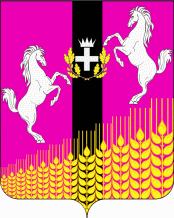
- Flag Coat of arms
- Interactive map of Shkurinskaya
- Location of Shkurinskaya Shkurinskaya (Krasnodar Krai)
- Coordinates: 46°35′N 39°22′E
- Country: Russia
- Federal subject: Krasnodar Krai
- Administrative district: Kushchyovsky District
- Founded: 1794
- Elevation: 12 m (39 ft)

Population (2010 Census)
  - Total: 4,597
  - Estimate (2021): 4,382 (−4.7%)
- Time zone: UTC+3 (MSK)
- Postal codes: 352000, 352001
- OKTMO ID: 03628431101

Shkurinskaya (Russian: Шкуринская) is a rural locality (a stanitsa) in Kushchyovsky District of Krasnodar Krai, Russia. Population: 4,597 (2010 census); 4,941 (2002 census).
