= 56th Guards District Training Center =

8th Rifle Brigade (1940 – February 1942) 136th Rifle Division (II) (February 1942 – January 1943) 63rd Guards Rifle Division (January 1943 – July 1946) 37th Guards Mechanised Division (July 1946 – 1957) 37th Guards Motor Rifle Division (1957–1964) 63rd Guards Training Motor Rifle Division (1965–1987) 56th District Training Centre
- Active: 1940–present
- Country: Soviet Union; Russia
- Branch: Red Army (1940-1946); Soviet Ground Forces (1946-1991); Russian Ground Forces (1991-present)
- Type: Infantry
- Size: Division
- Garrison/HQ: Sertolovo-2
- Engagements: Siege of Leningrad: Sinyavino Offensive; Operation Iskra; Operation Polyarnaya Zvezda; Leningrad-Novgorod Offensive Vyborg–Petrozavodsk Offensive

Commanders
- (1940-June 1943): Nikolai Simoniak
- (June 1943-1945): A. F. Sheglov
- Notable commanders: Nikolai Simoniak

The 56th Guards Krasnoye Selo Order of Lenin Red Banner District Training Center is a training center of the Russian Ground Forces.

It descends from the 63rd Guards Rifle Division, a Soviet division during World War II. Among other operations, it fought in the Battle of Tali-Ihantala from June 25 to July 9, 1944, during the Continuation War.

In July 1946, it became 37th Guards Mechanised Division, and in 1957 the 37th Guards Motor Rifle Division. It was located at Sertalovo in the Leningrad Military District.

On 6 February 1965 it regained its Second World War number and became the 63rd Guards Training Motor Rifle Division. (In late 1964 the previous 63 MRD in Lugansk, Kiev MD, had been redesignated the 4th Guards Motor Rifle Division.)

In the 1980s it was the 63rd Guards Motor Rifle Training Division.

In 1987 it became the 56th Guards District Training Centre for the Preparation of Junior Specialists.

During the Russian military reform, in 2010, the training center became a branch of the 467th Guards District Training Center. This was reversed on 1 February 2015 and the 56th Guards District Training Center became independent again.
