= Sovetskaya, Krasnodar Krai =

Sovetskaya Советская
- Stanitsa
- Interactive map of Sovetskaya
- Location of Sovetskaya Sovetskaya (European Russia) Sovetskaya (Russia)
- Coordinates: 44°47′N 41°10′E
- Country: Russia
- Federal subject: Krasnodar Krai
- Administrative district: Novokubansky District
- Founded: 1841

Population (2010 Census)
  - Total: 9,021
  - Estimate (2021): 9,882 (+9.5%)
- Time zone: UTC+3 (MSK)
- Postal codes: 352230–352232, 352450
- OKTMO ID: 03634431101

Sovetskaya (Russian: Сове́тская, until 1933: Urupskaya, Russian: Урупская) is a rural locality (a stanitsa) in Novokubansky District of Krasnodar Krai, Russia, located on the Urup River. Population: 9,021 (2010 census); 10,036 (2002 census); 13,182 (1926 census).

According to the 1926 census, the population was 62.1% Russian and 34.8% Ukrainian.
