= Tbilissky District =

Tbilissky District Тбилисский район (Russian)
- District
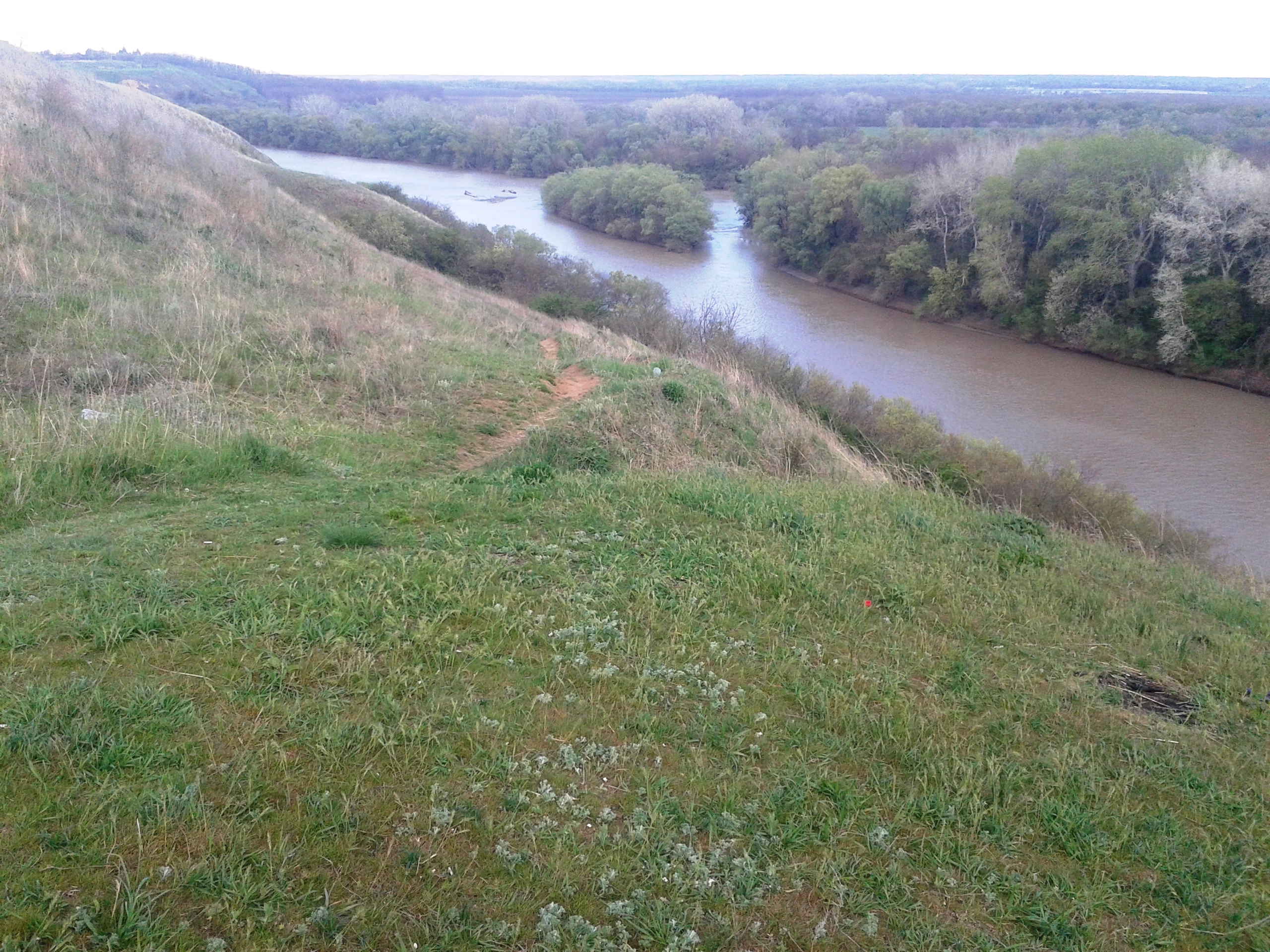
- Islands in stream near Tbilisi village, Tbilissky District

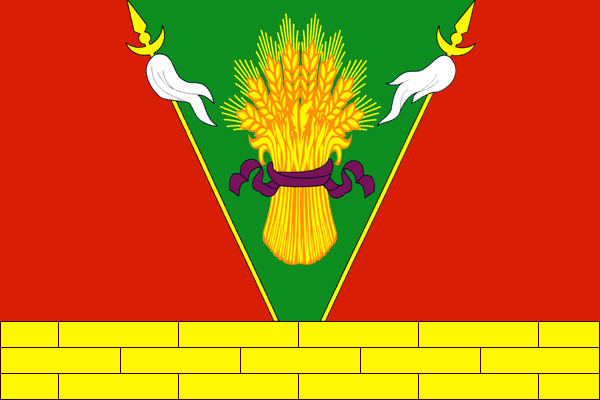
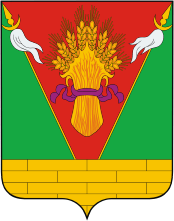
- Flag Coat of arms
- Location of Tbilissky District in Krasnodar Krai
- Coordinates: 45°22′N 40°12′E
- Country: Russia
- Federal subject: Krasnodar Krai
- Established: 1934
- Administrative center: Tbilisskaya

Area
  - Total: 992 km^{2} (383 sq mi)

Population (2010 Census)
  - Total: 48,536
  - Density: 48.9/km^{2} (127/sq mi)
  - Urban: 0%
  - Rural: 100%

Administrative structure
  - Administrative divisions: 8 Rural okrugs
  - Inhabited localities: 42 rural localities

Municipal structure
  - Municipally incorporated as: Tbilissky Municipal District
  - Municipal divisions: 0 urban settlements, 8 rural settlements
- Time zone: UTC+3 (MSK)
- OKTMO ID: 03649000
- Website: http://www.adm-tbilisskaya.ru/

Tbilissky District (Russian: Тбили́сский райо́н) is an administrative district (raion), one of the thirty-eight in Krasnodar Krai, Russia. As a municipal division, it is incorporated as Tbilissky Municipal District. It is located in the eastern central part of the krai.

The area of the district is 992 square kilometers (383 sq mi). Its administrative center is the rural locality (a stanitsa) of Tbilisskaya.

Population: 48,536 (2010 census); 48,752 (2002 census); 44,793 (1989 Soviet census). The population of Tbilisskaya accounts for 52.2% of the district's total population.
