= Besskorbnaya =

Besskorbnaya Бесскорбная
- Stanitsa
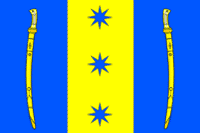
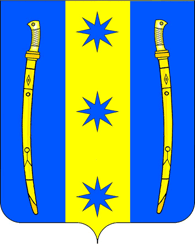
- Flag Coat of arms
- Interactive map of Besskorbnaya
- Location of Besskorbnaya Besskorbnaya (Krasnodar Krai)
- Coordinates: 44°38′N 41°18′E
- Country: Russia
- Federal subject: Krasnodar Krai
- Administrative district: Novokubansky District
- Founded: 1855
- Elevation: 343 m (1,125 ft)

Population (2010 Census)
  - Total: 5,892
  - Estimate (2021): 5,779 (−1.9%)
- Time zone: UTC+3 (MSK)
- Postal codes: 352201, 352462
- OKTMO ID: 03634402101

Besskorbnaya (Russian: Бесско́рбная) is a rural locality (a stanitsa) in Novokubansky District of Krasnodar Krai, Russia, located on the Urup River. Population: 5,892 (2010 census); 5,762 (2002 census).
