= Starominsky District =

Starominsky District Староминский район (Russian)
- District
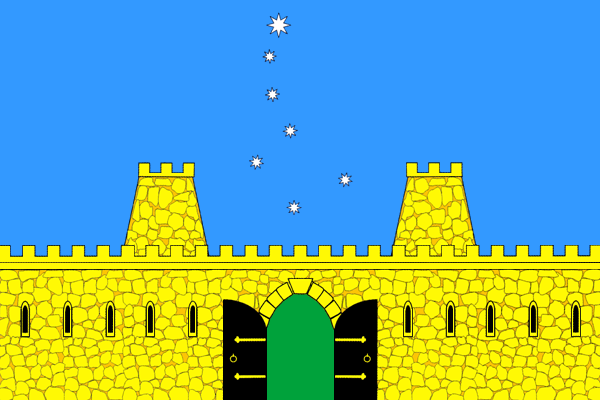
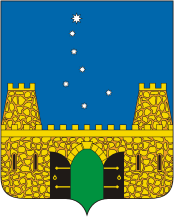
- Flag Coat of arms
- Location of Starominsky District in Krasnodar Krai
- Coordinates: 46°32′06″N 38°03′38″E
- Country: Russia
- Federal subject: Krasnodar Krai
- Established: 1924
- Administrative center: Starominskaya

Area
  - Total: 1,030 km^{2} (400 sq mi)

Population (2010 Census)
  - Total: 40,755
  - Density: 39.6/km^{2} (102/sq mi)
  - Urban: 0%
  - Rural: 100%

Administrative structure
  - Administrative divisions: 5 Rural okrugs
  - Inhabited localities: 21 rural localities

Municipal structure
  - Municipally incorporated as: Starominsky Municipal District
  - Municipal divisions: 0 urban settlements, 5 rural settlements
- Time zone: UTC+3 (MSK)
- OKTMO ID: 03647000
- Website: http://www.adm.starominska.ru

Starominsky District (Russian: Староминский райо́н) is an administrative district (raion), one of the thirty-eight in Krasnodar Krai, Russia. As a municipal division, it is incorporated as Starominsky Municipal District. It is located in the north of the krai. The area of the district is 1,030 square kilometers (400 sq mi). Its administrative center is the rural locality (a stanitsa) of Starominskaya. Population: 40,755 (2010 Census); 41,097 (2002 Census); 41,524 (1989 Soviet census). The population of Starominskaya accounts for 73.1% of the district's total population.
