= Seversky District =

Seversky District Северский район (Russian)
- District
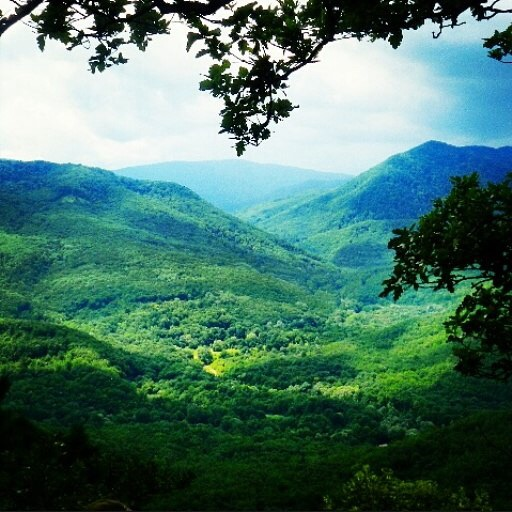
- Sober-Bash Mountain, Seversky District

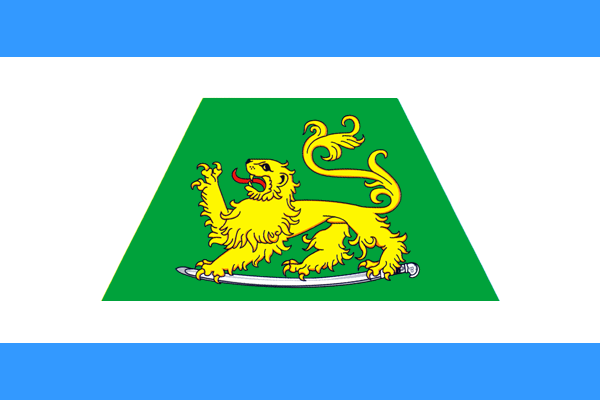
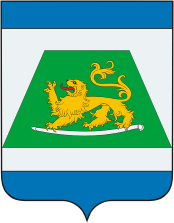
- Flag Coat of arms
- Location of Seversky District in Krasnodar Krai
- Coordinates: 44°51′20″N 38°40′46″E
- Country: Russia
- Federal subject: Krasnodar Krai
- Established: 2 June 1924
- Administrative center: Severskaya

Area
  - Total: 2,122 km^{2} (819 sq mi)

Population (2010 Census)
  - Total: 112,942
  - Density: 53.22/km^{2} (137.9/sq mi)
  - Urban: 45.5%
  - Rural: 54.5%

Administrative structure
  - Administrative divisions: 3 Settlement okrugs, 9 Rural okrugs
  - Inhabited localities: 3 urban-type settlements, 45 rural localities

Municipal structure
  - Municipally incorporated as: Seversky Municipal District
  - Municipal divisions: 3 urban settlements, 9 rural settlements
- Time zone: UTC+3 (MSK)
- OKTMO ID: 03643000
- Website: http://www.sevadm.ru/

Seversky District (Russian: Се́верский райо́н) is an administrative district (raion), one of the thirty-eight in Krasnodar Krai, Russia. As a municipal division, it is incorporated as Seversky Municipal District. It is located in the west of the krai. The area of the district is 2,122 square kilometers (819 sq mi). Its administrative center is the rural locality (a stanitsa) of Severskaya. Population: 112,942 (2010 census); 107,661 (2002 census); 96,015 (1989 Soviet census). The population of Severskaya accounts for 22.0% of the district's total population.

Historical population
Year	Pop.	±%
1939	52,539	—
1959	76,033	+44.7%
1970	89,368	+17.5%
1979	92,170	+3.1%
1989	96,015	+4.2%
2002	107,661	+12.1%
2010	112,942	+4.9%
2021	122,982	+8.9%
Source: Census data
