= Starominskaya =

Starominskaya Староминская
- Stanitsa
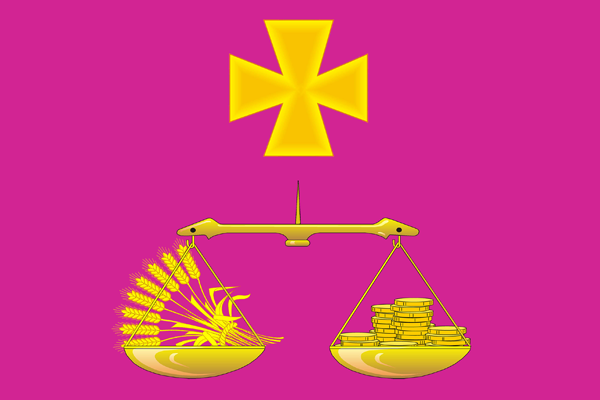
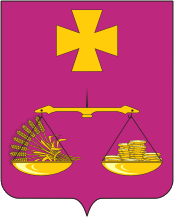
- Flag Coat of arms
- Interactive map of Starominskaya
- Location of Starominskaya Starominskaya (Krasnodar Krai)
- Coordinates: 46°32′N 39°03′E
- Country: Russia
- Federal subject: Krasnodar Krai
- Administrative district: Starominsky District
- Founded: 1794

Area
  - Total: 27.2 km^{2} (10.5 sq mi)
- Elevation: 16 m (52 ft)

Population (2010 Census)
  - Total: 29,809
  - Estimate (2021): 30,362 (+1.9%)
  - Density: 1,100/km^{2} (2,840/sq mi)

Administrative status
  - Capital of: Starominsky District
- Time zone: UTC+3 (MSK)
- Postal codes: 353600–353602, 353604, 353607
- OKTMO ID: 03647413101

Starominskaya (Russian: Староминская) is a rural locality (a stanitsa) and the administrative center of Starominsky District in Krasnodar Krai, Russia. Population: 29,809 (2010 census); 30,072 (2002 census); 30,743 (1989 Soviet census).
