= Kushchyovsky District =

Kushchyovsky District Кущёвский район (Russian)
- District
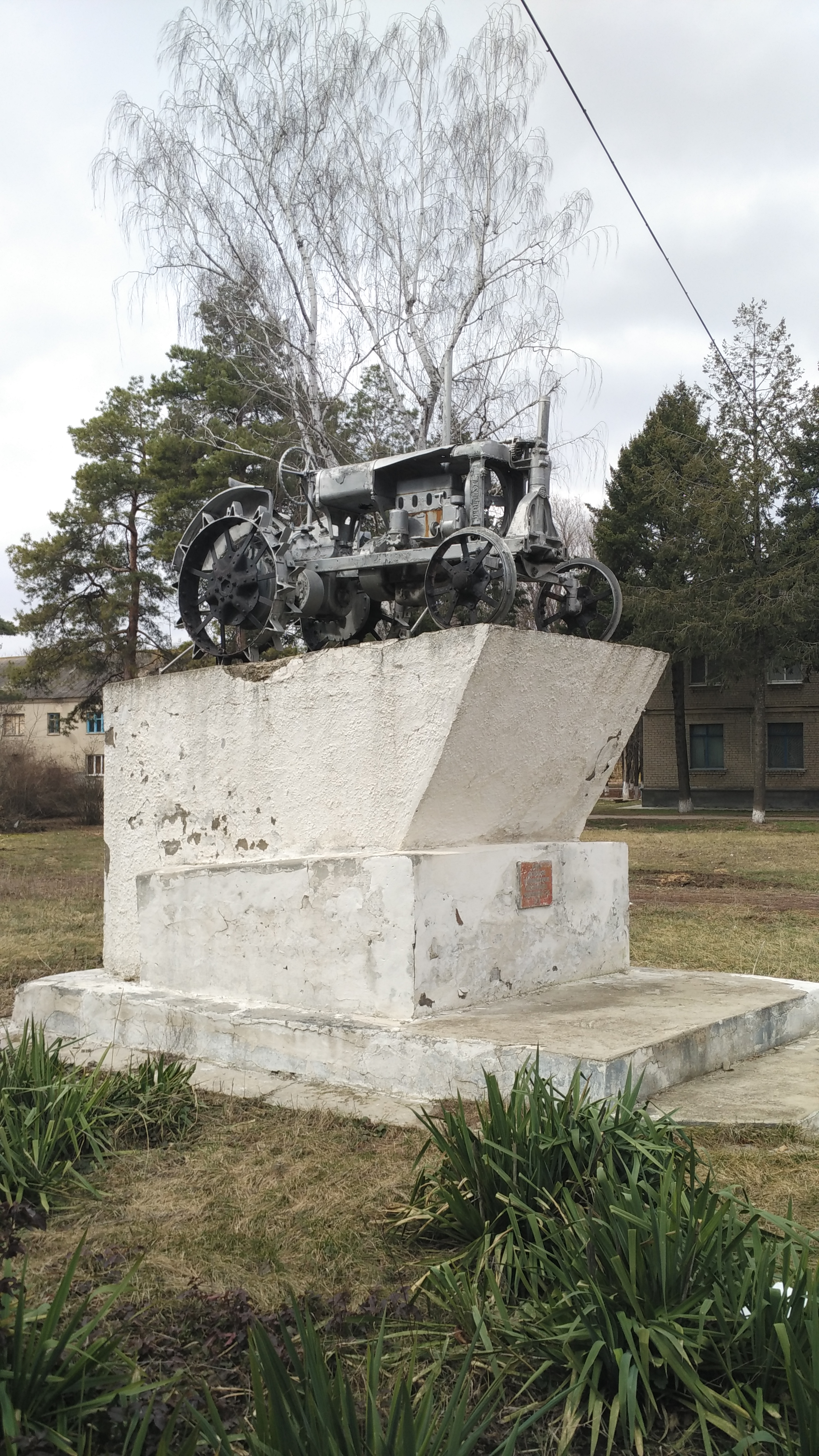
- "The first tractor - State Farm Kuschevskiy", Kushchyovsky District

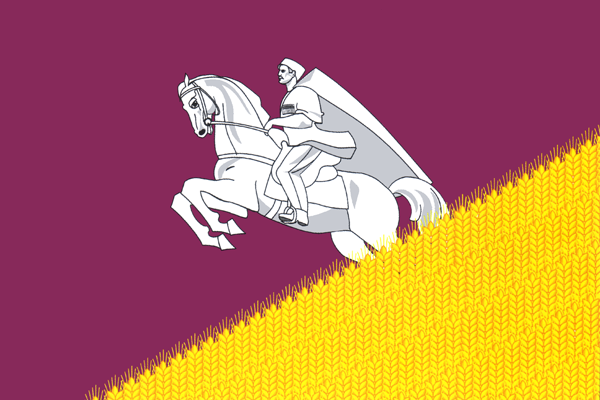
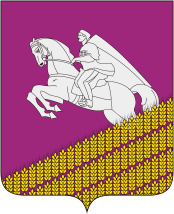
- Flag Coat of arms
- Location of Kushchyovsky District in Krasnodar Krai
- Coordinates: 46°34′N 39°38′E
- Country: Russia
- Federal subject: Krasnodar Krai
- Established: 2 June 1924
- Administrative center: Kushchyovskaya

Area
  - Total: 2,372 km^{2} (916 sq mi)

Population (2010 Census)
  - Total: 67,164
  - Density: 28.32/km^{2} (73.34/sq mi)
  - Urban: 0%
  - Rural: 100%

Administrative structure
  - Administrative divisions: 13 Rural okrugs
  - Inhabited localities: 74 rural localities

Municipal structure
  - Municipally incorporated as: Kushchyovsky Municipal District
  - Municipal divisions: 0 urban settlements, 12 rural settlements
- Time zone: UTC+3 (MSK)
- OKTMO ID: 03628000
- Website: http://www.adm-kush.ru/

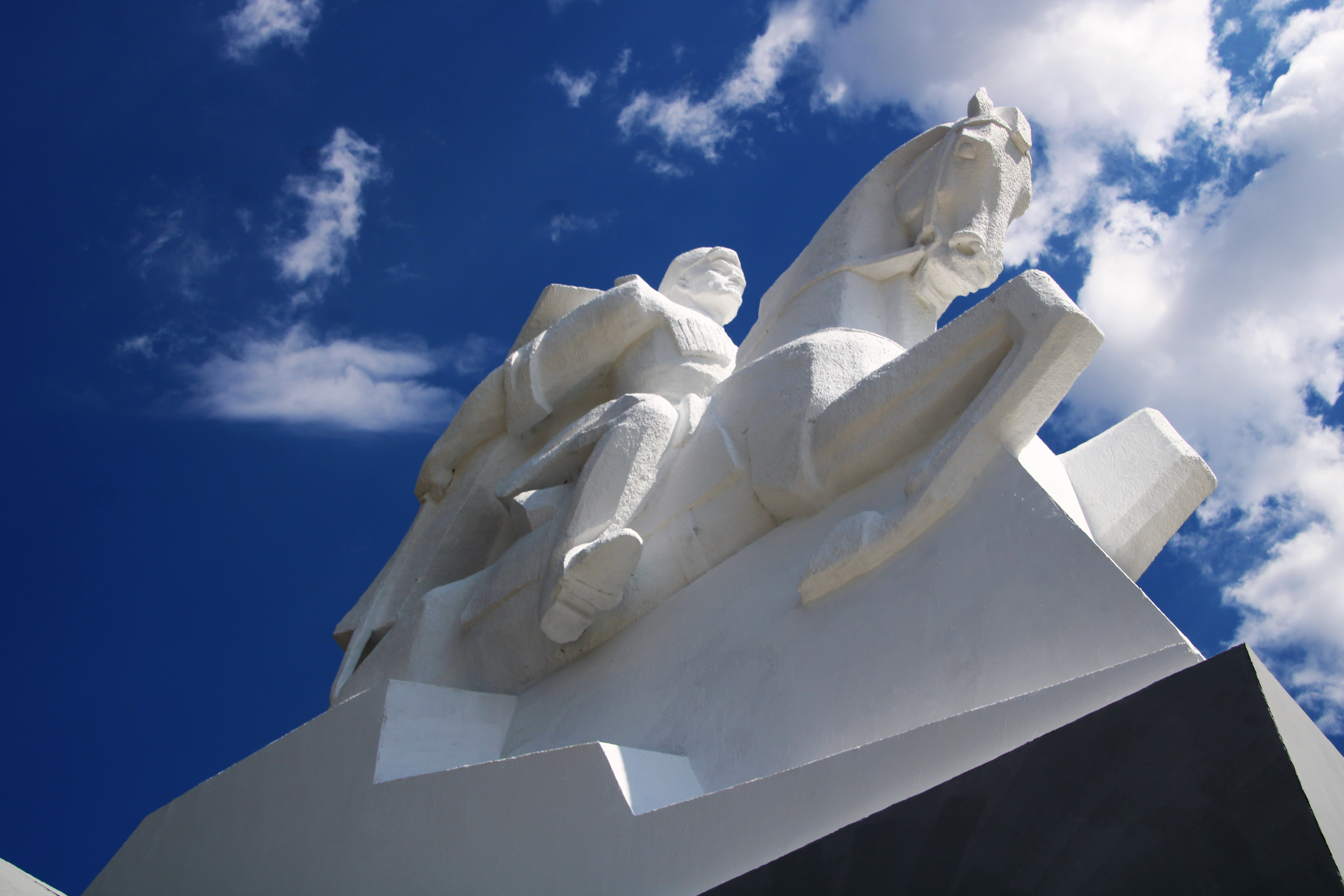
Monument to the Cossacks-Guards

Kushchyovsky District (Russian: Кущёвский райо́н) is an administrative district (raion), one of the thirty-eight in Krasnodar Krai, Russia. As a municipal division, it is incorporated as Kushchyovsky Municipal District. It is located in the north of the krai. The area of the district is 2,372 square kilometers (916 sq mi). Its administrative center is the rural locality (a stanitsa) of Kushchyovskaya. Population: 67,164 (2010 census); 70,513 (2002 census); 66,238 (1989 Soviet census). The population of Kushchyovskaya accounts for 42.2% of the district's total population.
