= Kushchyovskaya =

Kushchyovskaya Кущёвская
- Stanitsa
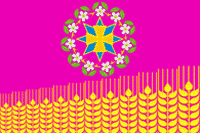
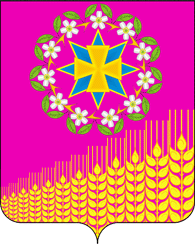
- Flag Coat of arms
- Interactive map of Kushchyovskaya
- Location of Kushchyovskaya Kushchyovskaya (Krasnodar Krai)
- Coordinates: 46°34′N 39°39′E
- Country: Russia
- Federal subject: Krasnodar Krai
- Administrative district: Kushchyovsky District
- Founded: 1794
- Rural locality status since: 1842
- Elevation: 15 m (49 ft)

Population (2010 Census)
  - Total: 28,362
  - Estimate (2021): 30,375 (+7.1%)

Administrative status
  - Capital of: Kushchyovsky District

Municipal status
  - Municipal district: Kushchyovsky Municipal District
  - Rural settlement: Kushchyovskoye Rural Settlement
  - Capital of: Kushchyovsky Municipal District, Kushchyovskoye Rural Settlement
- Time zone: UTC+3 (MSK)
- Postal codes: 352030–352033, 352037
- OKTMO ID: 03628416101

Kushchyovskaya population
- 2010 Census: 28,362
- 2002 Census: 29,533
- 1989 Census: 26,300
- 1979 Census: 24,627

Kushchyovskaya (Russian: Кущёвская) is a rural locality (a stanitsa) and the administrative center of Kushchyovsky District in Krasnodar Krai, Russia. As of the 2010 Census, its population was 28,362. Kushchyovskaya (air base) is near to the town.

== History ==
It was established in 1794 and reclassified as a stanitsa in 1842. The settlement came to national attention in 2010 as the site of the Kushchyovskaya massacre.

== Notable people ==
- Anatoly Yermolin (born 1960), politician, journalist and former army officer
