= Ladozhskaya =

Ladozhskaya Ладожская
- Stanitsa
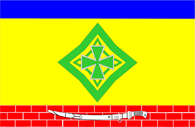
- Flag
- Interactive map of Ladozhskaya
- Location of Ladozhskaya Ladozhskaya (Krasnodar Krai)
- Coordinates: 45°18′17″N 39°55′49″E
- Country: Russia
- Federal subject: Krasnodar Krai
- Administrative district: Ust-Labinsky District
- Founded: 1802
- Elevation: 93 m (305 ft)

Population (2010 Census)
  - Total: 14,828
  - Estimate (2021): 14,022 (−5.4%)
- Time zone: UTC+3 (MSK)
- Postal codes: 352320, 352323
- OKTMO ID: 03657419101

Ladozhskaya (Russian: Ладожская) is a rural locality (a stanitsa) in Ust-Labinsky District of Krasnodar Krai, Russia, located on the Kuban River. Population: 14,828; (2010 census) 14,714 (2002 census).
