= Severskaya =

Severskaya Северская
- Stanitsa
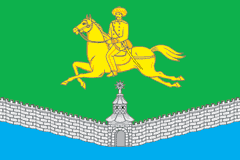
- Flag
- Interactive map of Severskaya
- Location of Severskaya Severskaya (Krasnodar Krai)
- Coordinates: 44°51′N 38°41′E
- Country: Russia
- Federal subject: Krasnodar Krai
- Administrative district: Seversky District
- Founded: 28 May 1864
- Elevation: 47 m (154 ft)

Population (2010 Census)
  - Total: 24,867
  - Estimate (2021): 26,973 (+8.5%)

Administrative status
  - Capital of: Seversky District
- Time zone: UTC+3 (MSK)
- Postal code: 353240
- OKTMO ID: 03643413101

Severskaya (Russian: Се́верская) is a rural locality (a stanitsa) and the administrative center of Seversky District of Krasnodar Krai, Russia. Population: 24,867 (2010 census); 22,557 (2002 census); 19,707 (1989 Soviet census).
