= Temizhbekskaya =

Temizhbekskaya Темижбекская
- Stanitsa
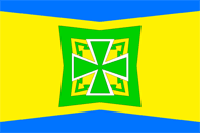
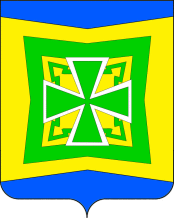
- Flag Coat of arms
- Interactive map of Temizhbekskaya
- Location of Temizhbekskaya Temizhbekskaya (Krasnodar Krai)
- Coordinates: 45°26′38″N 40°50′43″E
- Country: Russia
- Federal subject: Krasnodar Krai
- Administrative district: Kavkazsky District
- Founded: 1802
- Elevation: 124 m (407 ft)

Population (2010 Census)
  - Total: 5,778
  - Estimate (2023): 5,153 (−10.8%)
- Time zone: UTC+3 (MSK)
- Postal codes: 352150, 352151
- OKTMO ID: 03618452101

Temizhbekskaya (Russian: Темижбекская) is a rural locality (a stanitsa) in Kavkazsky District of Krasnodar Krai, Russia, located on the Kuban River. It is named after the village of the Circassian Prince Temizh - Bek, whose tract was located on the opposite side of the Kuban. Population: 5598 (2020), 5,778 (2010 census); 6,033 (2002 census).
