= Tbilisskaya =

Tbilisskaya Тбилисская
- Stanitsa
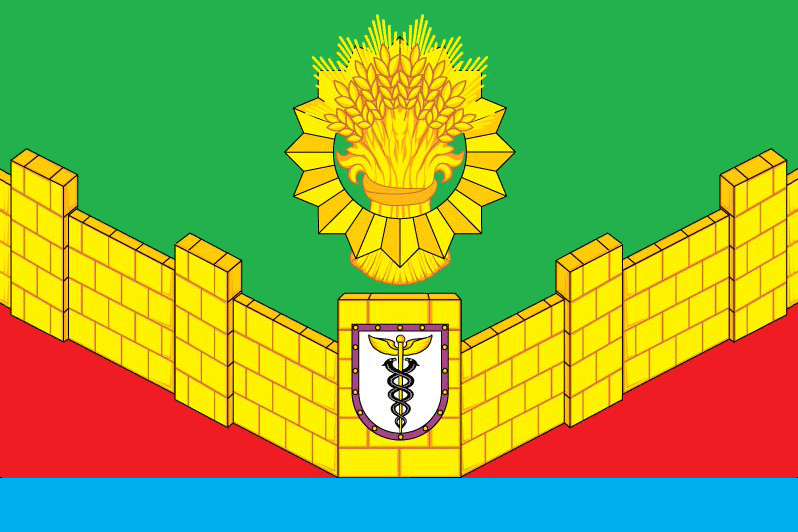
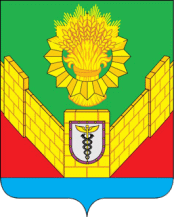
- Flag Coat of arms
- Location of Tbilisskaya
- Location of Tbilisskaya Tbilisskaya (Krasnodar Krai)
- Coordinates: 45°21′N 40°12′E
- Country: Russia
- Federal subject: Krasnodar Krai
- Administrative district: Tbilissky District
- Founded: 1802
- Elevation: 105 m (344 ft)

Population (2010 Census)
  - Total: 25,317

Administrative status
  - Capital of: Tbilissky District
- Time zone: UTC+3 (MSK)
- Postal code(s): 352360
- OKTMO ID: 03649419101

Tbilisskaya (Russian: Тбилисская) (until 1936 — Tiflisskaya) is a village in the Krasnodar Territory of the Russian Federation, the administrative center of the Tbilissky District. It is located in the central part of the Krasnodar Territory, on the right bank of the Kuban River, 100 km north-east of Krasnodar. As of 2020, the population was 24,446.
