= Georgy Zozulya =

Georgy Petrovich Zozulya
- Георгий Петрович Зозуля
- Born: 5 February 1920; Grozny
- Died: 5 January 1954 (aged 33); Krasnodar
- Military career
- Allegiance: Soviet Union
- Branch: Soviet Air Force
- Service years: 1939 – 1950
- Rank: Lieutenant
- Unit: 43rd Guards Attack Aviation Regiment
- Conflicts: World War II
- Awards: Hero of the Soviet Union

Georgy Petrovich Zozulya (Russian: Георгий Петрович Зозуля; 5 February 1920 – 5 January 1954) was a ground-attack pilot in the Soviet Air Force during World War II.

== Awards ==
- Hero of the Soviet Union (15 May 1946)
- Order of Lenin (15 May 1946)
- Order of the Red Banner (20 September 1944)
- Order of the Patriotic War 1st Class (19 December 1944)
- Order of the Red Star (15 May 1944)
- campaign medals
