= Yevgeny Dietrich =

Russian politician; Minister of Transport (2018–2020)

- Евегений Дитрих
- Dietrich in 2025

Senator from Novgorod Oblast
- Incumbent
- Assumed office 15 October 2025
- Preceded by: Sergey Mitin

Minister of Transport
- In office 18 May 2018 – 9 November 2020
- President: Vladimir Putin
- Prime Minister: Dmitry Medvedev; Mikhail Mishustin
- Preceded by: Maksim Sokolov
- Succeeded by: Vitaly Savelyev

Personal details
- Born: Yevgeny Ivanovich Dietrich; 8 September 1973 (age 53) Mytischi, Moscow Oblast, USSR
- Party: United Russia
- Education: National Research Nuclear University MEPhI; State University of Farming

Yevgeny Ivanovich Dietrich or Ditrikh (Russian: Евгений Иванович Дитрих; born 8 September 1973) is a Russian politician, former Minister of Transport of Russia from 18 May 2018 to 9 November 2020.

He has the federal state civilian service rank of 1st class Active State Councillor of the Russian Federation.

== Biography ==
Yevgeny Dietrich was born on 8 September 1973 in Mytishchi town in Moscow Oblast. He is of German descent.

In 1996 he graduated from the Moscow Engineering Physics Institute with a degree in Applied mathematics, in 1999 the Higher School of Privatization with a degree in law.

From 1995 to 1998 he was an adviser, Deputy Chief, and then Chief of the Department of the State Committee for State Property Management of Russia.

From 1998 to 2004, he was Deputy Chief, Chief of the department, and then Deputy Chief of the Department of Normative and Methodological Support of the Ministry of Property Relations of Russia.

From 2004 to 2005 he was deputy director of the Department of the Ministry of Economic Development and Trade.

From 2005 to 2012 he was Deputy Chief of the Federal Road Agency.

From 2012 to 2015, he was deputy director of the Department of Industry and Infrastructure of the Russian Government.

In 2015, he headed the Federal Service for Supervision of Transport.

From 14 October 2015 to 18 May 2018, he was the First Deputy Minister of Transport of Russia.

On 18 May 2018 he was appointed Minister of Transport of Russia. On 21 January 2020 he was re-appointed for this office.

Dietrich was retired on 9 November 2020.

On 19 November 2020, Dietrich became General Director of PJSC State Transport Leasing Company.

He is married and has three children.

== Awards ==
- Order of Honour;
- Thanks from the Russian Government;
- Badge "Honorary Worker of Transport of Russia".

Political offices
Preceded by Maksim Sokolov	Minister of Transport; 2018-2020	Succeeded by Vitaly Savelyev
