= Dmitry Yadrov =

Russian government official and enginneer

- Дмитрий Ядров

Minister of Transport
- Incumbent
- Assumed office 22 October 2026
- Prime Minister: Mikhail Mishustin
- Preceded by: Andrey Nikitin

Head of the Federal Air Transport Agency
- In office 15 September 2023 – 22 October 2026
- Preceded by: Alexander Neradko

Personal details
- Born: 3 May 1988 (age 38) Yakutsk, Yakut ASSR, Soviet Union
- Party: Independent
- Education: Saint Petersburg State University of Civil Aviation
- Profession: Politician, engineer

Dmitry Viktorovich Yadrov (Russian: Дмитрий Викторович Ядров; born 3 May 1988) is a Russian government official.

== Biography ==
Dmitry Yadrov was born in 1988. He graduated from the Saint Petersburg State University of Civil Aviation, specializing as an engineer in air navigation services and airspace utilization.

He held various positions at the State Air Traffic Management Corporation.

In 2019, he joined Rosaviatsia (the Federal Air Transport Agency). As deputy head of the agency, he coordinated the work of departments responsible for air traffic management, flight operations, and the development of airfield infrastructure. In addition, Yadrov oversaw the implementation of key federal projects within the sector. In September 2023 he became the head of Rosaviatsia. On October 2026 he was nominated as Minister of Transport amidst a reshuffle in the Second Cabinet of Mikhail Mishustin. He took office on October 22.
