= Vesna =

Vesna may refer to:

- Vesna (mythology), female characters associated with youth and springtime in early Slavic mythology
- Vesna (given name), Slavic female name, includes a list of people with the name
- Vesna (surname), includes a list of people with the name
- Vesna (film), 1953 Slovene romantic comedy
- Vesna Case (1930-1931), massive Soviet repressions against former officers of the Russian Imperial Army serving in the Red Army
- Operation Vesna (1948), one of the two largest Soviet deportations from Lithuania
- Vesna – Green Party, Slovenian political party
- Vesna (Russia), liberal youth organization in Russia
- Vesna (band), Czech band who represented their country at the Eurovision Song Contest 2023
- Vesna (album), 2023 studio album by Croatian rock band Pips, Chips & Videoclips
- Vesna, a 1985 song by the Soviet band Kino from the album Eto ne lyubov...

== See also ==
- Wesna
