= Nikolay Shipil =

Soviet/Russian economist (born 1955)

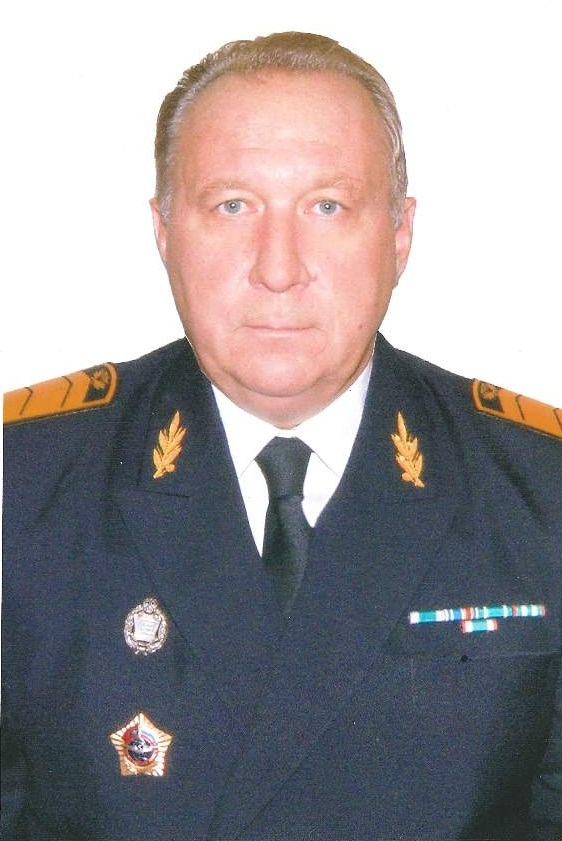
Nikolay Shipil

Nikolay Vladimirovich Shipil (born February 25, 1955, in Takhtabrod, Chistopolsky District, Kokchetav Oblast, Kazakh Soviet Socialist Republic, Soviet Union) is a senior manager in civil aviation, a distinguished employee of the Ministry of Transport of the Russian Federation, and president of International Investment Corporation, and was head of the Federal Air Transport Agency (FATA) of the Russian Federation from 2004 to 2005.

== Education ==
- 1975 – Leningrad Aviation Technical College of Civil Aviation;
- 1980 – Leningrad Finance and Economics Institute
- 1981-1983 – Academy of Civil Aviation, Department for advanced training
- 1984 – Department for advanced professional training of senior management at the Academy of Civil Aviation (Saint Petersburg State University of Civil Aviation)
- 1987 – Post-graduate studies at the Academy of Civil Aviation
- 1991 – Academy of National Economy at the Council of Ministers, Agence pour la Cooperation Technique, Industrielle et Economique

== Career ==
- 1972-1975 – Cadet, Leningrad Aviation Technical College of Civil Aviation (LATUGA)
- 1975-1978 – Member of staff, International Air Transport Division, Central Air Transport Agency (TSAVS) of the Leningrad civil aviation branch
- 1978-1983 – Deputy Head, International Operations Department, Leningrad civil aviation branch
- 1984-1985 – Deputy Head HR Department, Leningrad civil aviation branch
- 1985-1989 – Deputy General Representative of Aeroflot, Zurich (Switzerland)
- 1989-1997 – Deputy Director International Operations, Pulkovo Aviation Enterprise
- 1997-1999 – Director for Commerce, Pulkovo Aviation Enterprise
- 1999-2000 – Regional Representative Northern Europe and Baltic States, Pulkovo State Unitary Aviation Enterprise
- 2000-2004 – Director General, ″Russia″ State Transport Company
- 2004-2005 – Head, Federal Air Transport Agency
- 2005-2006 – General Representative in Italy, OJSC ″Aeroflot″
- 2004-2005 – Member of the Board of Directors, Sheremetyevo International Airport
- 2004-2005 – Chairman of the Board of Directors, JSC ″Domodedovo airlines″
- 2004-2005 – Member of the Board of Directors OJSC ″Aeroflot″
- 2004-2005 – Member of the Board of Directors, Ilyushin Finance Co.

== Awards ==
=== Government ===
- Order of Friendship – 1997
- Honorary Title Distinguished Employee of the Transport of the Russian Federation – 2003
- Certificate of Merit of the Government of the Russian Federation – 2003
- Acknowledgement of the Government of the Russian Federation – 2005

=== Departmental ===
- ″Air Transport Expert″ Award Pin – 2002
- Honorary Medal of the Ministry of Foreign Affairs – 2002
- Badge of Honour of the Security Council of the Russian Federation – 2003
- Medal for Cooperation (Foreign Intelligence Service) – 2005
