= Baldin =

Baldiny (Russian: Балдин) is a Russian masculine surname; its feminine counterpart is Baldina. It may refer to:

- Aleksander Baldin (born 1984), Estonian swimmer
- Alexander Baldin (physicist) (1926–2001), Russian physicist
- Alyssa Baldin (born 1990), Canadian hockey player
- Irina Baldina (1922–2009), Russian painter
- Lucas Baldin (born 1991), Brazilian football player
- Baldina, South Australia

== See also ==
- Baldin Collection, a group of masterpieces moved from Nazi Germany to the Soviet Union by Victor Baldin
