= Vladimir Chepets =

Head of the Federal Agency for Railway Transport
- In office 6 June 2017 – Incumbent
- Prime Minister: Dmitry Medvedev (2014-2020); Mikhail Mishustin
- Preceded by: Alexey Tsydenov

Personal details
- Born: Turkmen SSR Soviet Union
- Education: Tashkent Institute of Railway Transport Engineers
- Profession: Railwayman

Vladimir Chepets (Russian: Владимир Юрьевич Чепец) is a Russian railwayman and government official who has served in various positions in the Russian Railway sector. Since 2017 he is the head of the Federal Agency for Railway Transport subordinated to the Ministry of Transport of the Russian Federation.

== Biography ==
In 1980 he graduated from college number 2 of the city of Chardzhou, Turkmen SSR, majoring in "Driver Assistant". In 1989 he graduated from the Tashkent Institute of Railway Transport Engineers with a degree in Diesel and Diesel Locomotives. In March 1980, he was Assistant driver of the locomotive depot of Chardzhou Central Asian Railway (Russian: Среднеазиатская железная дорога). From 11.1980 to 12.1982 he served in the Soviet Armed Forces. In January 1983 he became Assistant Locomotive Engineer, Locomotive Depot Engineer Chardzhou Central Asian Railway 02.1987 was appointed Acting Auditor, Traffic Safety Inspector at the locomotive farm, Deputy Head, Acting Head of the Locomotive Department of the Chardzhou branch of the Central Asian Railway. On 08/08, he was deputy chief of the technical work station, deputy chief of the operational work station of the lost station of the Northern Railway. In 12.1995, he was the head of the Lost Station of the Transport Department of the Vologda branch of the Northern Railway. Since 08.2000 he served as chief engineer, chief auditor for train safety at the Vologda branch, a branch of the Federal State Unitary Enterprise “Northern State Railway” of the Ministry of Railways of Russia. In October 2003 he was chief engineer of the Vologda branch of the Northern Railway, a branch of Russian Railways. In January 2006 he was appointed Head of the Capital Construction Service of the Northern Railway Transport, a branch of Russian Railways. In July 2007 Head of the Department for Capital Construction of the Northern Railway. In July 2009 he became Deputy Head of the Federal Agency for Railway Transport. On 6 June 2017 he was appointed head of the Federal Agency for Railway Transport.

He was awarded the Order "For Merit to the Fatherland" II degree.
