= PortNews =

- Company type: Private company
- Industry: News agency
- Founded: April 15, 2004; 22 years ago
- Headquarters: Saint Petersburg, Russia
- Area served: Russia
- Products: News media, analytics
- Owner: PortNews Media Group LLC
- Website: en.portnews.ru

PortNews is a Russian news agency focused on shipping and sea transport. The company provides detailed on-line news and analytical materials related to Russian market of port services, sea and river transportation, and shipbuilding. Special attention is paid to oil and fuel markets.

Informational resource comprises exclusive branch news that focus on bunkering, logistics, stevedoring, shipbuilding, and surveyor services. All news articles placed on the site are available as open access.

By 2016, the agency's site was visited daily by about 4,000 specialists including personnel of the Russian Ministry of Transport, representatives of port administrations, regional authorities and regulatory agencies. Besides, PortNews IAA provides consulting, marketing, advertising and PR services.

== History ==
The information portal (www.en.portnews.ru) was established in 2004. The portal is a mass media site.

Since 2008 IAA PortNews has been being a member of the Association of Sea Commercial Ports (ASOP).

Information portal "Rus-shipping». was established in 2011 as a joint project of the Association of Shipping industry association of companies and PortNews.

Edition of "Port Service. Bunker market - is an analytical report. It's issued by PortNews twice a year on the basis of the industry since 2005. The publication is intended as information and analysis, contains reviews and analytical articles, own statistics agency.
