= Roman Starovoyt =

Russian politician (1972–2025)

- Роман Старовойт
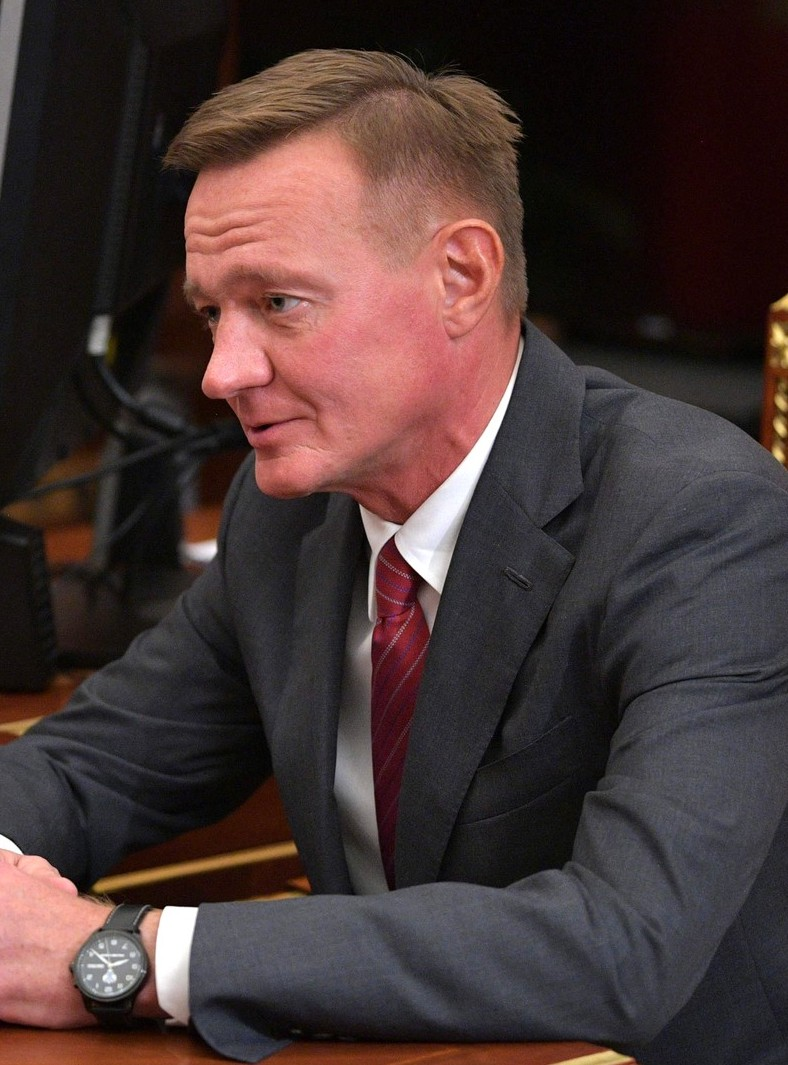
- Starovoyt in 2018

Minister of Transport
- In office 14 May 2024 – 7 July 2025
- President: Vladimir Putin
- Prime Minister: Mikhail Mishustin
- Preceded by: Vitaly Savelyev
- Succeeded by: Andrey Nikitin

4th Governor of Kursk Oblast
- In office 16 September 2019 – 14 May 2024; Acting: 11 October 2018 – 16 September 2019
- Preceded by: Alexander Mikhailov
- Succeeded by: Alexei Smirnov

Personal details
- Born: 20 January 1972 Kursk, Russian SFSR, Soviet Union
- Died: 7 July 2025 (aged 53) Razdory, Moscow Oblast, Russia
- Cause of death: Gunshot wound
- Party: United Russia
- Education: Baltic State Technical University; Northwestern Management Institute; Moscow University of the Ministry of Internal Affairs of Russia

Roman Vladimirovich Starovoyt (Russian: Роман Владимирович Старовойт; 20 January 1972 – 7 July 2025) was a Russian politician who served as Minister of Transport from May 2024 to July 2025. He had previously served as Governor of Kursk Oblast from 2019 to 2024, Deputy Minister of Transport, and the head of the Federal Road Agency in that ministry. He was a member of the United Russia party.

Starovoyt was dismissed from his position as transport minister on 7 July 2025, and was found dead from a gunshot wound in his car a few hours later.

== Early life, education and qualifications ==
Starovoyt was born on 20 January 1972 in the Soviet city of Kursk. His father, Vladimir Aleksandrovich Starovoyt, worked at the Kursk Nuclear Power Plant. In 1974, his father was transferred to the Leningrad NPP, in the city of Sosnovy Bor, Leningrad Oblast, where Roman spent his childhood.

In 1995, Starovoyt graduated from the D. F. Ustinov Baltic State Technical University, majoring in “Pulse heat engines”.

In 2008, he graduated from the North-West Academy of Public Administration with a degree in State and Municipal Administration.

In 2012, at the Moscow University of the Ministry of Internal Affairs of Russia, he defended his dissertation for the degree of candidate of pedagogical sciences on the topic "Innovative methodology for training athletes in winter polyathlon".

In 2019, he graduated from the program for the development of the personnel management reserve of the Higher School of Public Administration (ВШГУ) of the RANEPA.

Starovoyt held the federal state civilian service rank of 1st class Active State Councillor of the Russian Federation.

== Career ==
In 1995, Starovoyt was the executive director of JSC Regional Investment Agency. In 1995–2001, he was General Director of the asset management company NPF Promyshlenny. In 2002–2005, he was the owner and CEO of the construction company Stroyinvest.

From 2005 to 2007, he held the position of Head of the Investor Relations Department of the St. Petersburg Government Investment and Strategic Projects Committee. In 2007–2010, Starovoyt was First Deputy Chairman of the Committee on Investments and Strategic Projects of the Government of St. Petersburg. From 2010 to 2012, he was deputy director of the Department of Industry and Infrastructure of the Office of the Government of the Russian Federation.

From 22 November 2012, he was the head of the Federal Road Agency (Rosavtodor).

On 1 October 2018, Starovoyt was appointed Deputy Minister of Transport of the Russian Federation.

On 11 October 2018, after the resignation of Alexander Mikhailov, he was appointed interim governor of Kursk Oblast.

On 8 September 2019, at the 2019 Unified Voting Day, he won with a result of 81.07% in the first round of elections of the Governor of Kursk Oblast. His term of office ended in 2024.

In May 2024, he was appointed by President Vladimir Putin as Minister of Transport of Russia.

== Death ==
On 7 July 2025, Starovoyt was dismissed by President Putin. A few hours after his resignation, Starovoyt was found dead with a gunshot wound in Malevich Park, near the village of Razdory, Odintsovo District, Moscow Oblast. According to Russian news outlets, Starovoyt may have committed suicide due to the threat of a criminal case of large-scale fraud being opened against him after Alexei Smirnov, his successor as governor of Kursk Oblast, who was fired in December 2024 and arrested in April 2025, allegedly testified against him. It is reported that Starovoyt shot himself with an award pistol given to him by the Ministry of Internal Affairs. The same day, one of his underlings, Andrey Korneichuk, was also found dead, with the government stating his cause of death was due to "acute heart failure."

A memorial service was held for Starovoyt in Moscow on 10 July that was attended by several government ministers. The office of President Putin, who did not attend the ceremony, sent a wreath. Starovoyt was buried at the Smolensky Cemetery in Saint Petersburg on 11 July. At his funeral he was described as "very active, cheerful, and loved life very much" with attendees expressing dismay with the theory he killed himself. Nina Khrushcheva compared the death to something seen out of one of Stalin's purges. According to political analyst Alexander Baunov, "Putin has equated stealing from military projects with treason. And the penalty for treason is death."

== Family ==
Starovoyt married a woman from Kursk 28 years his junior. After his death, owing to the investigation of corruption, she was forced for a time to live in a hotel while the inquisitors had control of his estate.

== See also ==
- Andrei Badalov, Vice President of Transneft who died three days prior under suspicious circumstances
- Suspicious Russia-related deaths since 2022
