= Andrei Badalov =

Russian engineer (1962–2025)

- Андрей Бадалов
- Badalov attending a press conference
- Born: Andrei Yuryevich Badalov; 17 September 1962; Krasnodar, USSR
- Died: 4 July 2025 (aged 62); Moscow, Russia
- Cause of death: Fall from apartment
- Education: Moscow Engineering Physics Institute (MEPhI)
- Occupation: Engineer
- Known for: Vice President of Transneft (2019–2025)

Andrei Yuryevich Badalov (Russian: Андре́й Ю́рьевич Бада́лов; 17 September 1962 – 4 July 2025) was a Russian engineer.

== Life and career ==
Badalov was born 17 September 1962, in Krasnodar, Russian Soviet Federative Socialist Republic, Soviet Union. In 1984, he graduated with honors from the Moscow Engineering Physics Institute (MEPhI) with a degree in engineering and mathematics. After working for several years in the private sector, in 2013 he headed the Voskhod Research Institute.

From 2019 until his death, he was one of the vice presidents of Transneft.

On 4 July 2025, Badalov died as a result of a fall from a height from his apartment on Rublevskoye Highway in Moscow. He was 62. The preliminary cause of death was suicide.

== See also ==
- Ravil Maganov, chairman of Lukoil, who also died from a fall
- Roman Starovoyt, former Minister of Transport, who died a few hours after his dismissal
- Suspicious Russia-related deaths since 2022
