= Federal Agency for Rail Transport =

Federal Agency for Railway Transport
- Федеральное агентство железнодорожного транспорта (Росжелдор)
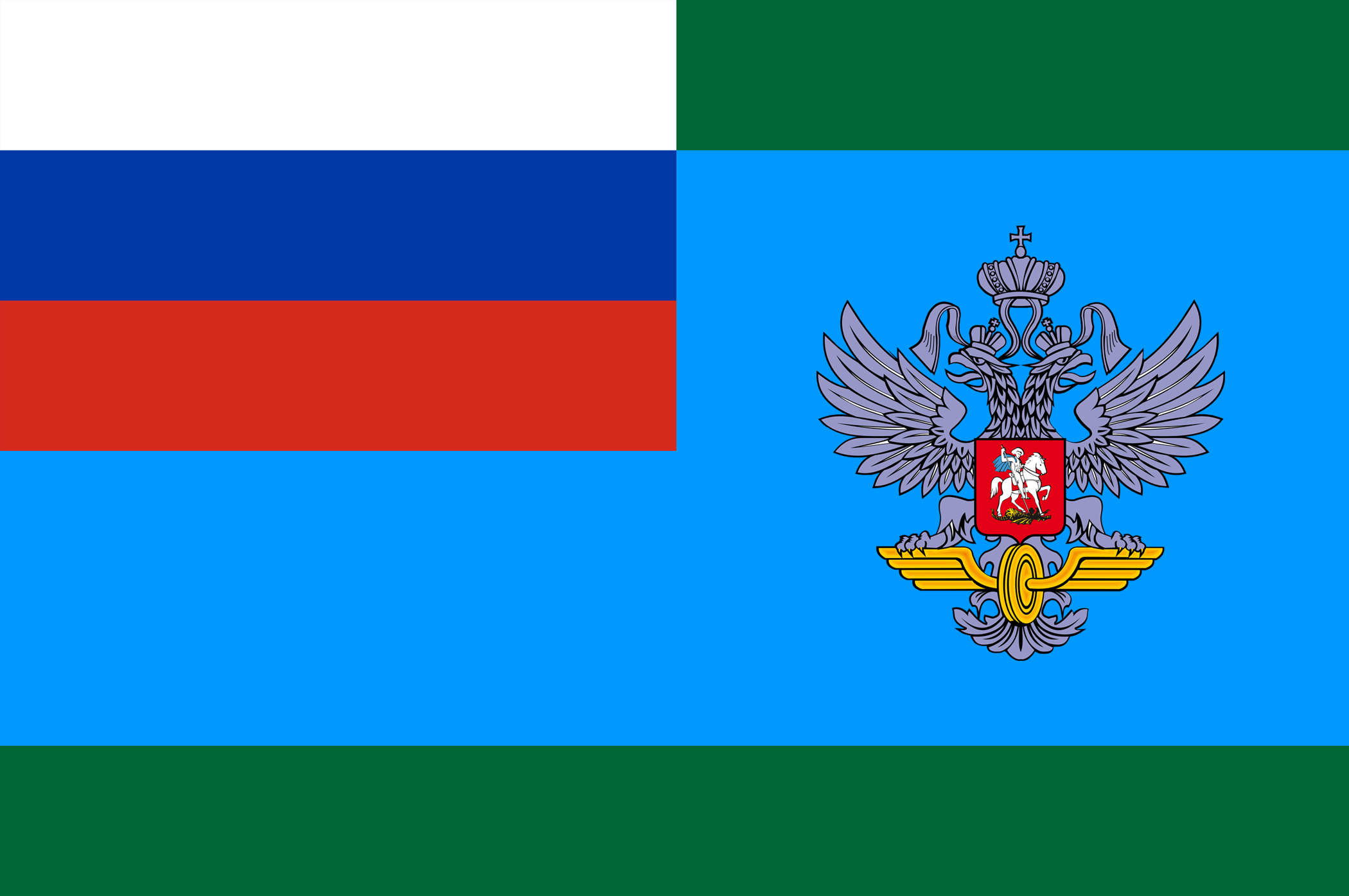
- Flag of the agency

- Emblem of the agency

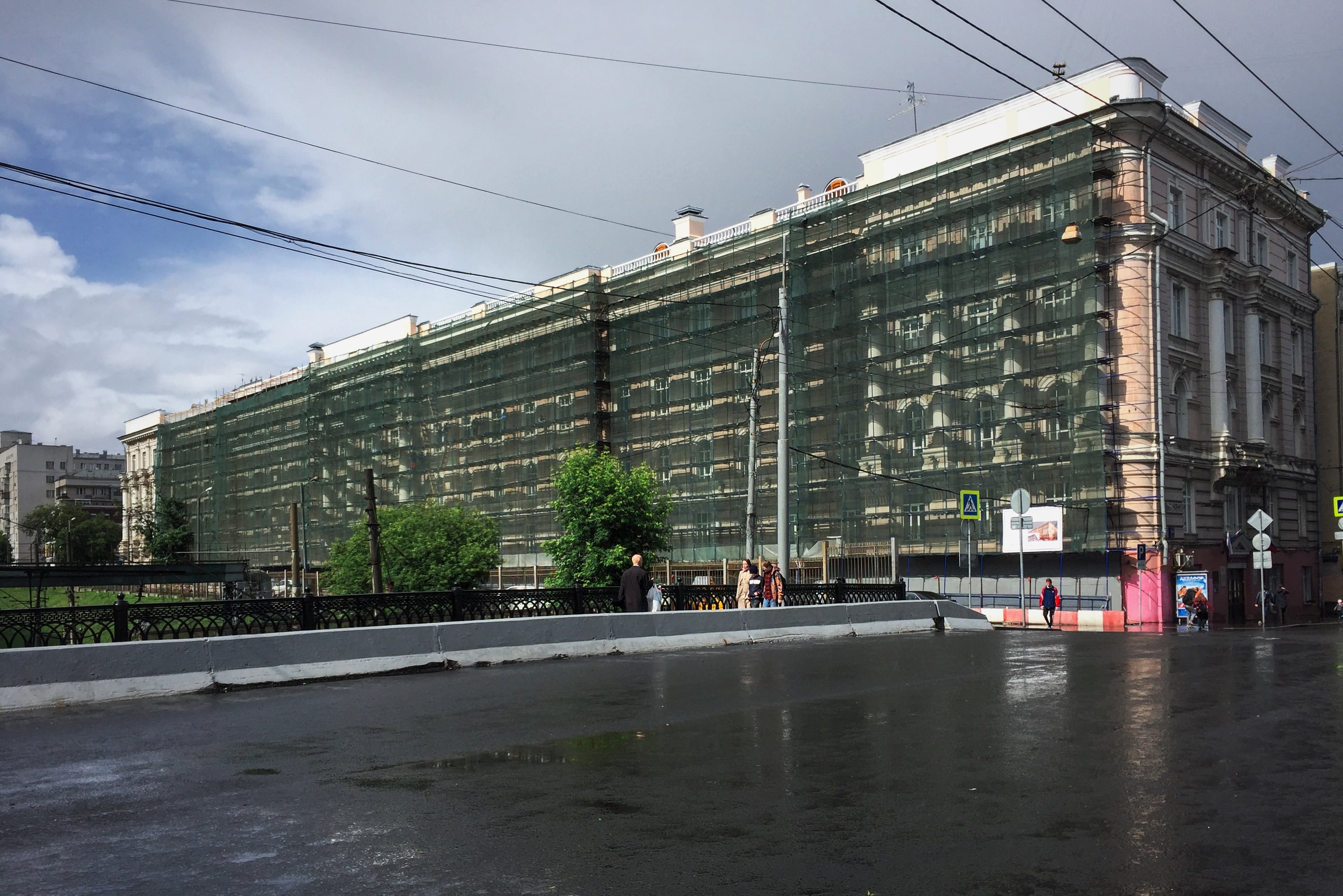

Federal agency overview
- Formed: March 12, 2004
- Headquarters: 11/2 Staraya Basmannaya str., Moscow, Russia; 55°45′52″N 37°39′29″E
- Federal agency executive: Vladimir Chepets
- Parent Federal agency: Ministry of Transport
- Website: www.rlw.gov.ru

The Federal Agency for Railway Transport (Roszheldor; Russian: Федеральное агентство железнодорожного транспорта (Росжелдор)) is a federal executive body that exercises functions of rendering public services, managing state property, as well as law enforcement functions and safety in the field of railway transport. Roszheldor is a federal agency subordinate to the Ministry of Transport of the Russian Federation. Roszheldor may create departmental security and departmental fire protection.

== History ==
Roszheldor was established on March 9, 2004, which was the last stage of the liquidation of the Ministry of Railways of the Russian Federation. In accordance with the concept of administrative reform and structural reform of the railways, the functions of formulating state policy and issuing normative acts were transferred to the Ministry of Transport of Russia, the functions of law enforcement, state property management and the provision of public services to Roszheldor, the oversight functions to Rostransnadzor, and the economic functions to Russian Railways.
