= NEVOD =

Coordinates: 55.6511°N 37.6679°E

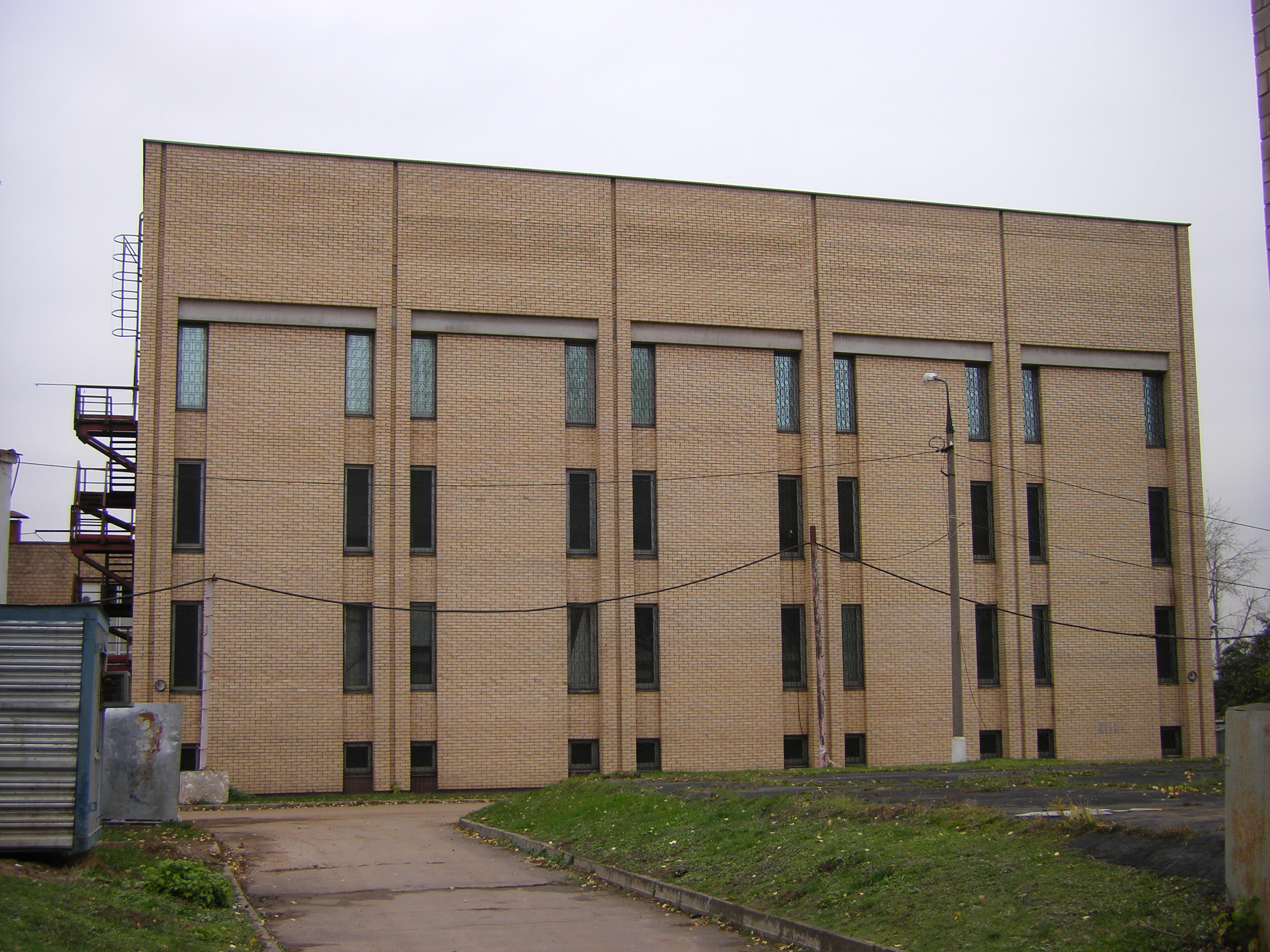
NEVOD building

NEVOD (Russian: НЕВОД, НЕйтринный ВОдный Детектор, Neutrino Water Detector; nevod means "dragnet" in Russian) is a neutrino detector and cosmic ray experiment that attempts to detect Cherenkov radiation arising from interactions between water and charged particles (mostly muons). It represents the first attempt to perform such measurements at the Earth's surface; it is because of this surface deployment that the experiment is also able to investigate cosmic rays. NEVOD is situated at the Moscow Engineering Physics Institute (MEPhI).

The term NEVOD experimental complex is used of the experimental complex built around the original water Cherenkov detector for the study of cosmic rays; as of 2018, the experimental complex consists of: the Cherenkov water detector (the eponymous NEVOD detector), a coordinate-tracking detector DECOR, an array of scintillation detectors forming the calibration telescopes system CTS, and PRISMA array of thermal neutron detectors. As of 2018, the experimental complex is being expanded by three new cosmic ray detectors: NEVOD-EAS (for determination of cosmic ray air shower parameters), URAN (neutron detector) and TREK (drift chamber detector). Part of the new detectors are under operation (in 2018).

The experimental complex used to also have a muon hodoscope URAGAN which was operational in 2016 and years prior. Current (2019) status of URAGAN is unknown.

== Description ==
As described by its inventors, NEVOD consists of a water reservoir measuring 9 m x 9 m x 26 m into which is placed a spatial lattice of quasi-spherical detector modules (QSMs) to record Cherenkov radiation from any direction. The dimensions of reservoir make it possible to arrange up to 241 QSMs.

The quasi-spherical modules are, in fact, not spherical, but consist of an array of 6 photomultiplier tubes arranged along the primary axes of the device. The arrangement of the PMTs is such that the response of the PMT is dependent only on the intensity of the incident radiation, but not on its angle of incidence (over the limitation of angles viewable by the device), rendering the entire detector "quasi-spherical".

== History ==
NEVOD started operations in 1994 and was described in a journal in 1995, and has since been used both for primary research and for educational purposes. Since the start of NEVOD experiment's operation, many detectors have been added to the original Cherenkov detector, becoming the NEVOD experimental complex. Also the Cherenkov detector has been upgraded many times. One upgrade of the experimental complex was discussed in 2015-2016.

As of 2018, the NEVOD experimental complex is operational.
