= Vesna (surname) =

Vesna is a surname. Notable people with the surname include:

- Elena Vesna (born 1962), Russian psychologist
- Fedor Vesna (died 1393), 14th-century falconer and nobleman of the Grand Duchy of Lithuania
- Victoria Vesna (born 1959), Serbian-American professor and digital media artist
