= Maksim Sokolov =

Russian economist and politician (born 1968)

Maxim Sokolov
- Максим Соколов
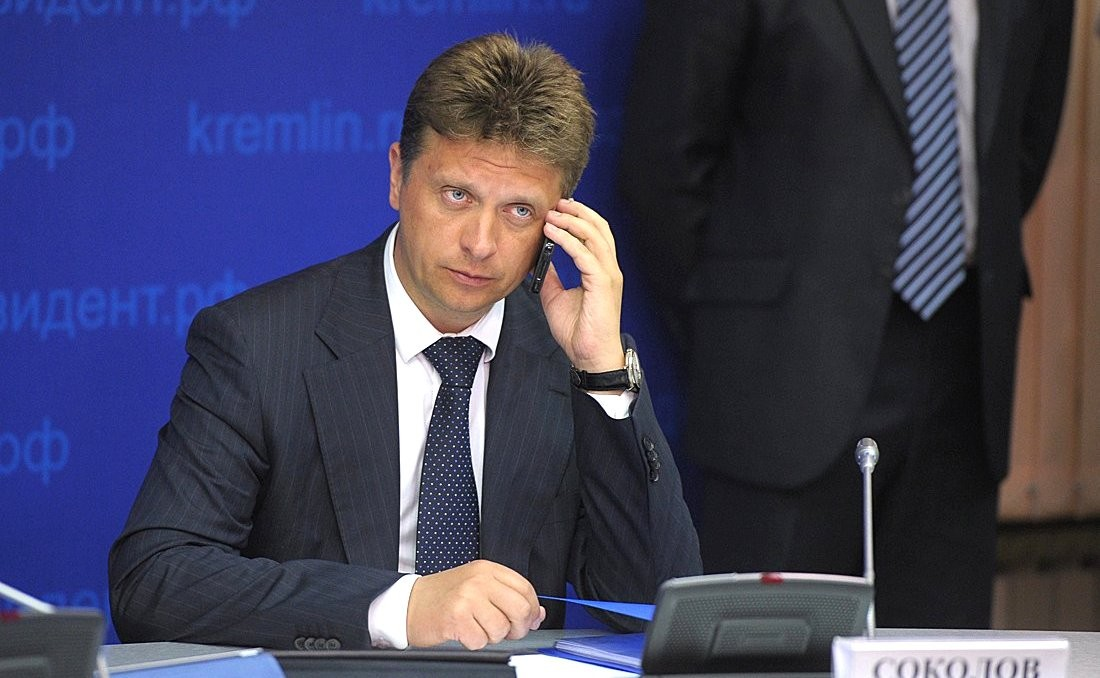
- Sokolov in 2012

Minister of Transport
- In office 21 May 2012 – 7 May 2018
- President: Vladimir Putin
- Preceded by: Igor Levitin
- Succeeded by: Yevgeny Dietrich

Director of the Department of Industry and Infrastructures of the Government
- In office 2009–2012

Personal details
- Born: Maksim Yurevich Sokolov; 29 September 1968 (age 58) Leningrad, Russian SFSR, Soviet Union (now Saint Petersburg, Russia)
- Party: Communist Party of the Soviet Union (Before 1991); Independent (1991–2003); United Russia (2004–present)
- Education: Leningrad State University
- Website: https://www.instagram.com/sokolov_mu/

Maksim Yurevich Sokolov (Russian: Максим Юрьевич Соколов, romanized: Maksim Yurevich Sokolov; born 29 September 1968) is a Russian economist and politician who was the Minister of Transport, from 21 May 2012 to 7 May 2018.

== Biography ==
=== Early life ===
Sokolov was born on September 29, 1968, in Leningrad. He served in the army from 1987 to 1989. In 1991, he graduated with honors from St. Petersburg State University with a degree in economics.

=== Career ===
Between 1991 and 1993, Sokolov worked as a lecturer in the department of economics at St. Petersburg State University.

In 2008 he defended his doctoral thesis in economics. According to examination made by Dissernet, this doctoral thesis contains gross undocumented plagiarism from two other doctoral theses.

In 2011, Sokolov became professor and chair of the department of the Higher Management School of Saint Petersburg State University.

=== Business ===
In 1992, he became Chairman of the "Rossi" Company. In 1999 and 2004 he became Chairman of "Corporation S", a company that builds elite homes in St Petersburg.

=== Political career ===
In 2004, he began working in the Administration of Saint Petersburg as Head of Committee for Strategic Projects of the Municipal government. In 2009, he was a member of the municipal government, as Chairman of Committee for Economic Development, Industrial policy and Trade.

In 2009, he moved to Moscow and on December 4 of the same year he became the Director of Department for Industry and Infrastructures of the Government of Russia. In May 2012, he was appointed Minister of Transportation by Dmitry Medvedev.

== Personal life ==
He is married and has three sons.

== Honours and awards ==
- Medal of the Order "For Merit" 2nd class

Political offices
Preceded by Igor Levitin	Minister of Transport; 2012-2018	Succeeded by Yevgeny Dietrich
