= Rosaviatsiya =

Russian aviation administration

Federal Air Transport Agency (Rosaviatsiya)
- Федеральное агентство воздушного транспорта (Росавиация)
- Emblem of the Federal Air Transport Agency

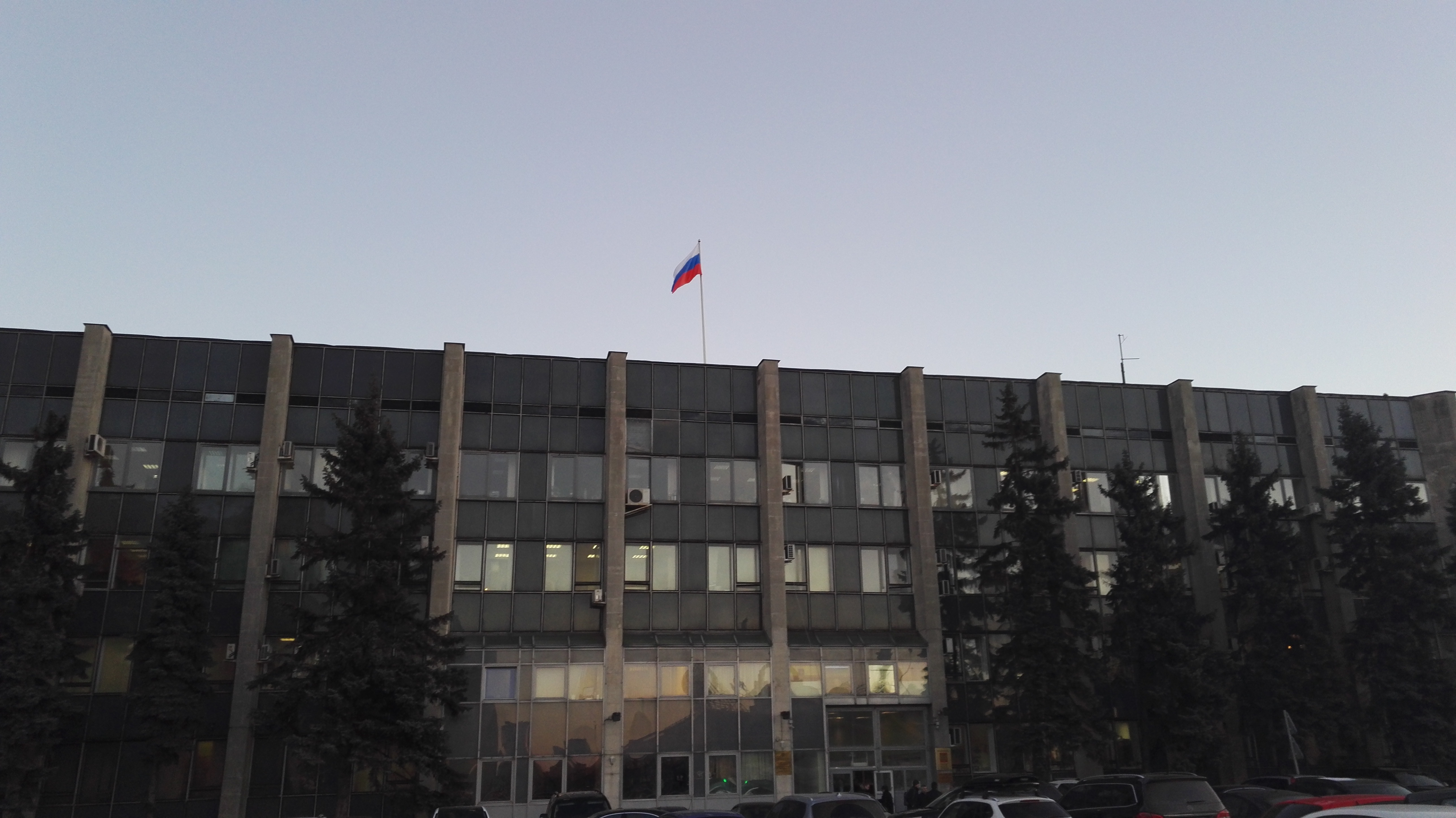
- Rosaviatsiya headquarters in Moscow

Federal Agency overview
- Formed: February 9, 2004
- Preceding Federal Agency: USSR Ministry of Civil Aviation
- Jurisdiction: Russian Federation
- Headquarters: Leningradsky Avenue, 37/2, Moscow, Russia
- Federal Agency executive: Dmitry Yadrov
- Parent Federal Agency: Ministry of Transport
- Child Federal Agency: State Air Traffic Management Corporation
- Website: favt.gov.ru

The Federal Air Transport Agency (Russian: Федеральное агентство воздушного транспорта - Federalnoye agentstvo vozdushnogo transporta, FAVT), also known as Rosaviatsiya (Russian: Росавиация), is the civil aviation authority of the Russian Federation, responsible for overseeing the civil aviation industry across Russia and surrounding international waters, covering about 14 flight information regions. Its headquarters are located in Moscow.

The Federal Air Transport Agency regularly works alongside the Interstate Aviation Committee in investigations of aviation accidents and incidents. It is also called the Russian Federation Civil Aviation Administration (RFCAA).

== History ==
The Federal Air Transport Agency was established in 2004 by Russian president Vladimir Putin. On March 9, 2004, Putin issued a decree, “On the System and Structure of Federal Executive Bodies,” in which the Agency was created. The Agency received many functions of the abolished Ministry of Transport of the Russian Federation.

A cyberattack on Rosaviatsia by hackers was unleashed in late March 2022 following the Russian invasion of Ukraine. The effect was a massive disruption and the Russian agency said it had switched back to paper records following the attack. Due to budget limitations, Rosaviatsia did not have good backup of the hacked data.

== Leadership ==
The head of the Federal Air Transport Agency is appointed and dismissed by the government of the Russian Federation. At its creation, the head was Nikolay Vladimirovich Shipil. Other heads followed, including from 2009, Alexander Neradko. who was replaced and sanctioned by the Ukrainian government for assisting in transferring Russian troops to the Ukrainian border. Since September 2022, Dmitry Yadrov has headed the Agency.

== Functions ==
The agency handles a mix of planning, regulation, and oversight. It runs federal investment and development programs and provides public services related to air travel, including making sure domestic and international flights run smoothly and that airports and aircraft are protected from unlawful interference.

The agency also issues directives based on Russia’s constitution and orders from the president, resolutions of the government, and transport ministry and is in charge of managing the country’s Unified Air Traffic Management System.

=== Flight information regions ===
Rosaviatsiya controls airspace covering about 15 flight information regions.

| ICAO code | FIR | ACC |
|---|---|---|
| UEEE | Yakutsk | Yakutsk ACC |
| UHHH | Khabarovsk | Khabarovsk ACC |
| UHMM | Magadan | Magadan ACC (Oceanic) |
| UHPP | Petropavlovsk-Kamchatsky | Petropavlovsk-Kamchatsky ACC |
| UIII | Irkutsk | Irkutsk ACC |
| URFV | Simferopol | Simferopol ACC |
| ULLL | Sankt-Peterburg | Sankt-Peterburg ACC (Oceanic) |
| UMKK | Kaliningrad | Kaliningrad ACC |
| UNKL | Krasnoyarsk | Krasnoyarsk ACC |
| UNNT | Novosibirsk | Novosibirsk ACC |
| URRV | Rostov-Na-Donu | Rostov-Na-Donu ACC |
| USSV | Yekaterinburg | Yekaterinburg ACC |
| USTV | Tyumen | Tyumen ACC |
| UUWV | Moscow | Moscow ACC |
| UWWW | Samara | Samara ACC |
