= Vladimir Okrepilov =

Soviet economist (1944–2026)

- Владимир Окрепилов
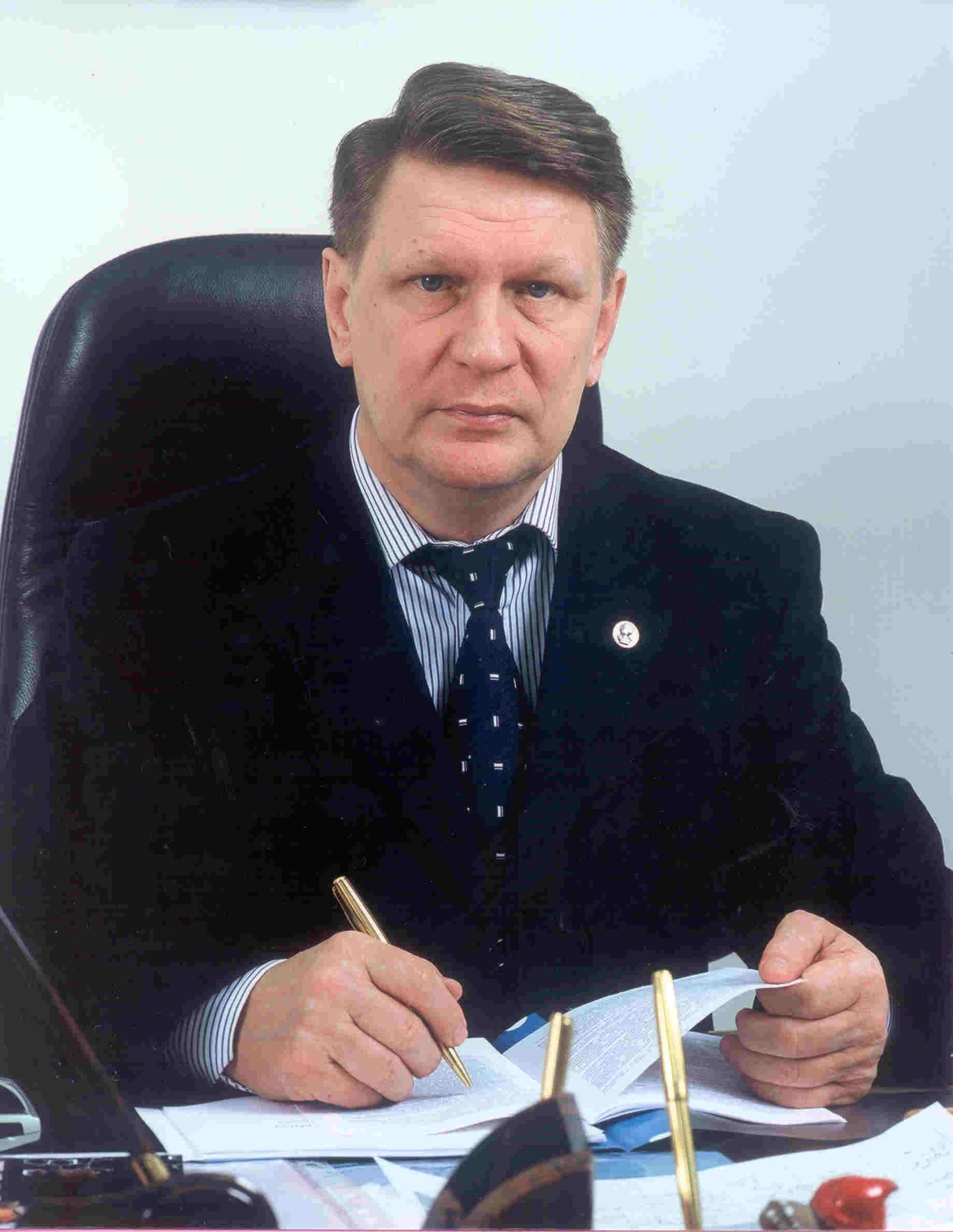
- Okrepilov in 2015
- Born: February 23, 1944; Leningrad, Russian SFSR, Soviet Union
- Died: July 6, 2026 (aged 82)
- Education: Baltic State Technical University
- Awards: Order "For Merit to the Fatherland"; Order of Honour (Russia); Order of Friendship; Order of Friendship of Peoples; Honorary citizen of St. Petersburg; Award of the Russian Federation Government in a field of education Award of the Russian Federation Government in the field of Science and Technology
- Scientific career
- Fields: Economics
- Workplaces: Test-St.Petersburg; Full member (academician) of Russian Academy of Sciences

Vladimir Valentinovich Okrepilov (Russian: Владимир Валентинович Окрепилов; February 23, 1944 – July 6, 2026) was a Soviet and Russian economist and academic.

Okrepilov served as General Director of the Federal budgetary institution State Regional Centre for Standardization, Metrology and Testing in St. Petersburg and Leningrad Region (State Centre "Test-St.Petersburg").

== Work experience ==
In 1970 graduated from the Leningrad Mechanical Institute (specialty: "Mechanical equipment of automatic installations").

- From 1965: Leningrad Plant of Radio Engineering Equipment – mechanic, technician, process engineer, senior design-engineer.
- From 1970 to 1979: public works.
- From 1979: Chief engineer at the D.I. Mendeleyev All–Russian Scientific Research Institute of Metrology (VNIIM)
- From 1986: Director of the Leningrad Center for Standardization and Metrology of the USSR Gosstandart
- From 1990 to 1992: General Director of the Leningrad Centre for Product Testing ("So-yuztest – Leningrad") of the USSR Gosstandart
- From 1992: General Director of the Russian Centre for Testing and Certification in St.Petersburg ("Rostest-St.Petersburg")
- From 1992 to 2001: General Director of the Centre for Testing and Certification in St.Petersburg (State Centre "Test-St.Petersburg") of Rosstandart.
- From 2001 to 2011: General Director of the Federal State Institution "Centre for Testing and Certification in St.Petersburg" (State Centre "Test-St.Petersburg") of Rosstandart.
- From 2011 to 2017: General Director of the Federal Budgetary Institution State Regional Centre for Standardization, Metrology and Testing in St. Petersburg and Leningrad Region (State Centre "Test-St.Petersburg") of Rosstandart.

== Scientific activity ==
Okrepilov founded a new field of economic science – Economics of Quality, based on the use of tools of quality management, standardization and metrology in ensuring socioeconomic progress and the quality of life improvement and was the leader of the scientific school on the Economics of Quality. He authored works on increasing the efficiency of the regional development based on the implementation of quality management models at the meso- and macro-levels. Under the leadership of V.V. Okrepilov, the Comprehensive Scientific and Technical Development Program of the Northwest Russia for a period of up to 2030 was developed. V.V. Okrepilov was one of the authors of the "Strategy on Social and Economic Development of St. Petersburg for the period of up to 2030 approved by the Decree of St. Petersburg Government of May 13, 2014, No. 355. Under his leadership, fundamental scientific research and practical calculations of economic benefits gained from various activity in the fields of standardization and metrology were carried out for the first time; and a national quality management system based on application of the MBO planning methods aimed at increasing the pace of the national economy modernization was developed. He made a scientific and organizational contribution to the development of the scientifically-based multilevel system of continuous personnel training in Economics of Quality. The scientific school «Economics and Quality Management» led by him is entered into the Register of the Leading Scientific and Pedagogical Schools of St. Petersburg.

== Death ==
Okrepilov died on July 6, 2026, at the age of 82.

== Academic and government awards, prizes, honorary titles and foreign awards ==
- Laureate of the RAS Award for the best achievements in science popularization in 2009 (2010).
- Awarded by: Order "For Merits to the Fatherland" of IV grade (1999), "Order of Honor" (2009), "Order of Friendship" (2016), "Order of Friendship of Peoples" (1988), medals: "Twenty years anniversary of victory in the Great Patriotic War of 1941-1945" (1965), "For valorous work".
