= Vitaly Savelyev =

Russian businessman and politician

- Виталий Савельев
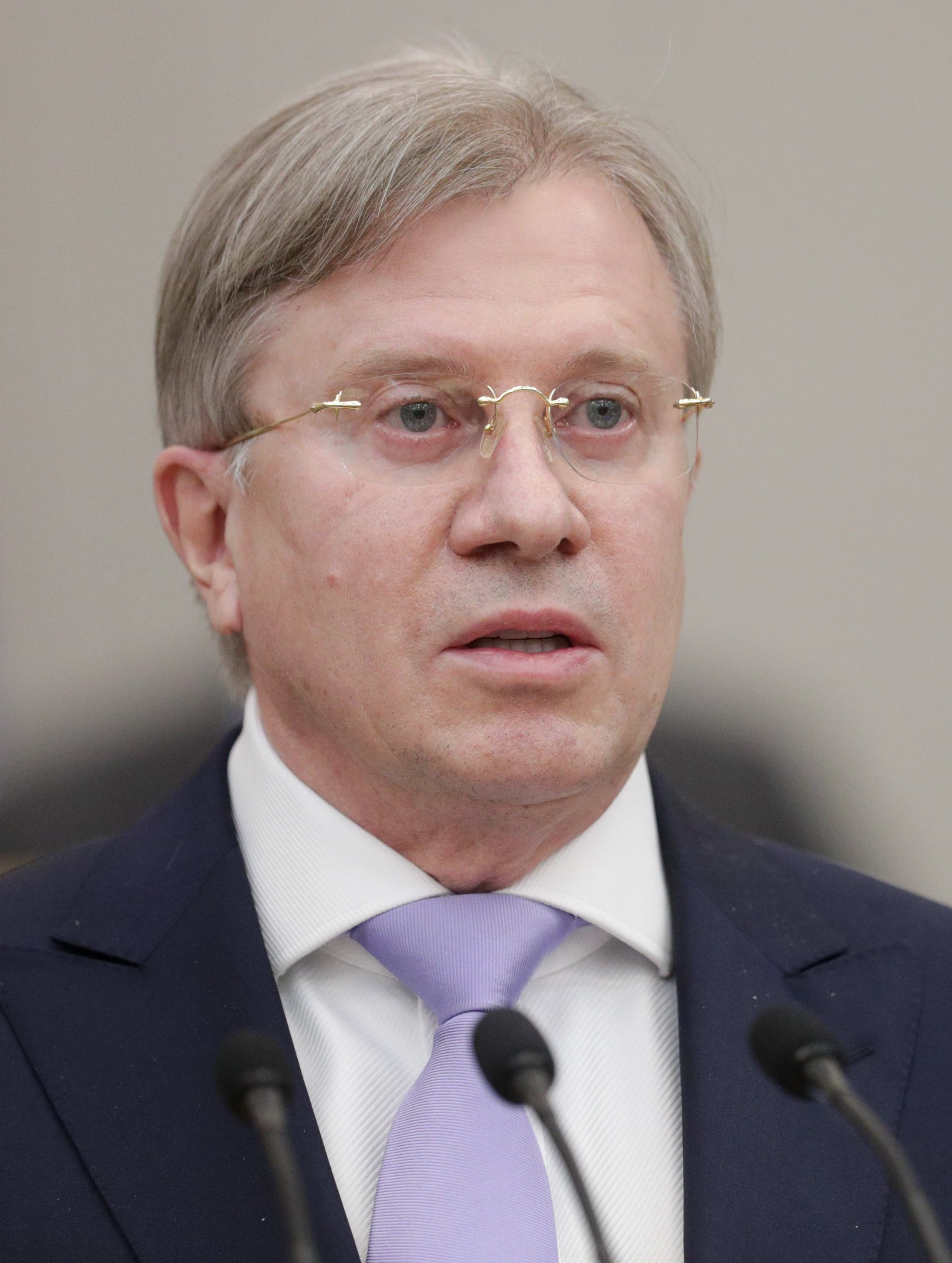
- Savelyev in 2020

Deputy Chairman of the State Duma
- Incumbent
- Assumed office 30 September 2026

Member of the State Duma
- Incumbent
- Assumed office 30 September 2026

Deputy Prime Minister of Russia for Transport
- In office 14 May 2024 – 28 September 2026
- President: Vladimir Putin
- Prime Minister: Mikhail Mishustin
- Preceded by: Office established
- Succeeded by: Andrey Nikitin

Minister of Transport
- In office 10 November 2020 – 7 May 2024; Acting: 7 May 2024 – 14 May 2024
- President: Vladimir Putin
- Prime Minister: Mikhail Mishustin
- Preceded by: Yevgeny Dietrich
- Succeeded by: Roman Starovoyt

Personal details
- Born: 18 January 1954 (age 72) Tashkent, Uzbek SSR, Soviet Union
- Party: United Russia
- Known for: CEO of OJSC Aeroflot
- Awards: Order of Honour; Jubilee Medal "300 Years of the Russian Navy"; Medal "In Commemoration of the 300th Anniversary of Saint Petersburg"; Medal "In Commemoration of the 1000th Anniversary of Kazan"

Vitaly Gennadyevich Savelyev (Russian: Виталий Геннадьевич Савельев; born 18 January 1954) is a Russian businessman and politician serving as the Member and Deputy Chairman of the State Duma, the lower house of the Russian Parliament.

Previously Savelyev was Deputy Prime Minister of Russia for Transport from May 2024 to September 2026., Minister of Transport from November 2020 to May 2024 and he served as the chairman and CEO of Aeroflot, Russia's largest airline, from 2009 to 2020.

== Biography ==
Vitaly Savelyev was born on 18 January 1954, in Tashkent. In 1977, he graduated from the Leningrad Polytechnic Institute (Mechanical Engineering), and earned a PhD in economics in 1986 from the Leningrad Engineering and Economics Institute.

From 1977 to 1984, Vitaly Savelyev worked at the USSR Ministry of Energy (Sayano-Shushenskaya Dam). He became deputy director of the All-Union SevZapMetallurgMontazh Trust in 1984, and deputy director of the GlavLeningradEngStroy Chief Directorate in 1987. In 1989, he was named President of Russian-American DialogInvest JV, chairman of the executive board of Rossiya Bank in 1993, and chairman of the executive board of Menatep in 1995. In 2001–2002, he was Deputy Chairman of the executive board of OJSC Gazprom,

- 2001 − present — Member of the Council of the Association of Russian Banks
- 2002 − 2004 — Gros United Company, Vice-president
- 2004 − 2007 — Ministry of Economic Development and Trade, Deputy Minister
- 2007 − 2009 — AFK Sistema, First Vice-president
- 2009 − present — OJSC Aeroflot – Russian Airlines, Director General
- 2020 − 2024 - Minister of Transport
- 2024 − present - Deputy Prime Minister for Transport

Vitaly Savelyev served as chairman of the boards at All-Russia Exhibition Centre, OJSC Russian Development Bank, MTS, Komstar, OJSC SMM, CJSC SkyLink, and Shiam Telelink.

In 2010, Russian president Vladimir Putin tasked Vitaly Savelyev to transform Aeroflot in Russia's first full-fledged airline group. Many regional carriers were merged with Aeroflot. In 2013, he made Aeroflot the main sponsor of the UK soccer team Manchester United. He introduced Aeroflot's new low-cost airline Pobeda in 2014 and actively contributed to bend Russia's aviation code to favor the development of airline activities. In June 2017, he announced that 40% of Aeroflot's fleet would be composed of domestic aircraft (including Irkut aircraft). Between 2009 and 2017, the number of passengers carried by Aeroflot grew from 8.9 million to 50.1 million. In August 2018, he was reelected CEO of Aeroflot.

In 2018, the US added Vitaly Savelyev in its "Kremlin List", not a sanction, rather a way to identify Russia's top economic agents. In May 2022 the United States Department of the Treasury placed sanctions on him pursuant to Executive Order 14024 as a member of the Government of Russia.

=== Sanctions ===
He was sanctioned by the UK government in 2022 in relation to the Russo-Ukrainian War.

=== Minister of Transport ===
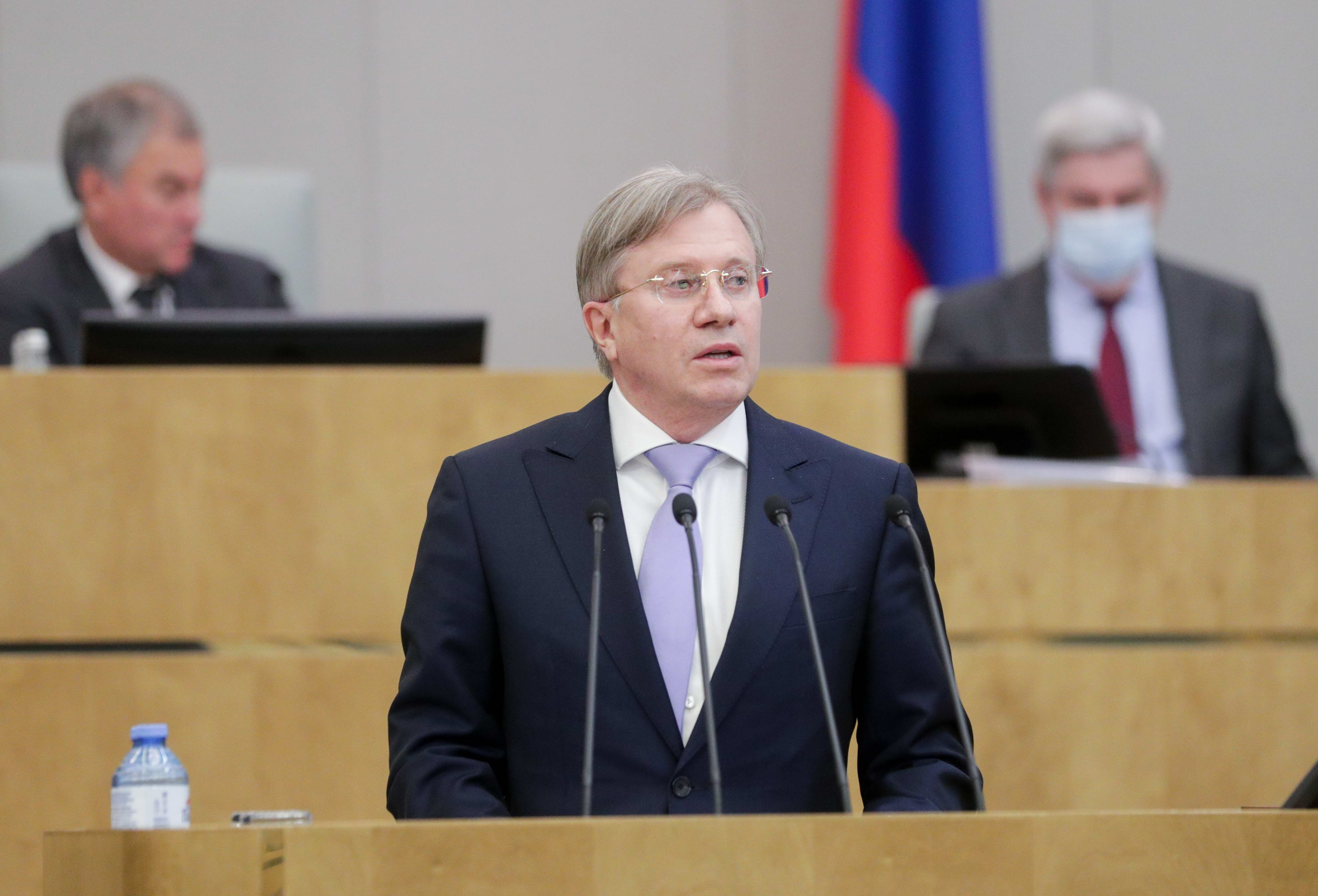
Savelyev at his confirmation hearing on 10 November 2020

On 9 November 2020, Prime Minister Mikhail Mishustin nominated Savelyev for the Minister of Transport after the resignation of Yevgeny Dietrich. On 10 November, Savelyev's candidacy was approved by the State Duma and on the same day, President Vladimir Putin signed a decree appointing Savelyev to the post of Minister.

== Personal life ==
Savelyev was a boxer and achieved the rank of Candidate for Master of Sport of the USSR. He is married and has two sons and one daughter.

== Honours and awards ==
- Order of Honour (Russian Federation)
- Medal "In Commemoration of the 300th Anniversary of Saint Petersburg"
- Medal "In Commemoration of the 1000th Anniversary of Kazan"
- “Leader of the Year” category winner at “Person of the Year 2011” award according to RosBusinessConsulting (RBC), Russia's leading Internet holding company (2012).
