= Baltic State Technical University =

Technical university in Saint Petersburg, Russia

Baltic State University
- Балтийский государственный технический университет "Военмех" им. Д.Ф.Устинова
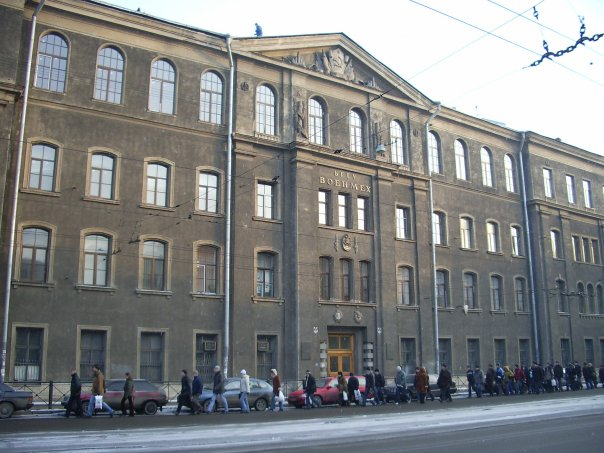
- Type: University
- Established: 1871 (1932)
- Rector: Shashurin A.E.
- Undergraduates: 7000
- Location: Saint Petersburg, Russia; 59°54′59″N 30°19′00″E
- Campus: Two campuses
- Website: www.voenmeh.ru

Baltic State Technical University "Voenmeh" D.F. Ustinov (Russian: Балтийский государственный технический университет "Военмех" им. Д.Ф.Устинова; abbreviated BGTU) is a Russian technical university situated in Saint Petersburg. Previously it was known as the Leningrad Mechanical Institute (Russian: Ленинградский механический институт) and Military Mechanical Institute (Russian: Военно-механический институт).

== History ==
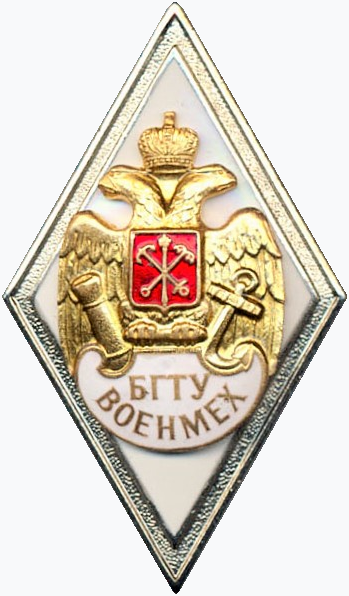
Academic graduation badge of the university

- 1875: Tsesarevich Nikolay's Handicraft College is created (for which is considered an heir)
- 1932: Established by order of the People's Commissariat of Heavy Industry of the USSR, as the Leningrad Military Mechanical Institute
- 1992: Reformed as Baltic State Technical University, after D.F. Ustinov

== Faculties ==
- Rocket and Space Technology Faculty (A)
- Arms and Weapons Systems Faculty (E)
- Department of Information and Control Systems (I)
- Natural Science (O)
- International Industrial Management and Communications (R)

== Notable alumni ==
- Dmitriy Feodorovich Ustinov (Marshal of the USSR, the Minister of Defense of the USSR from July 30, 1976 to December 20, 1984)
- Sergei Krikalev (cosmonaut)
- Georgi Grechko (cosmonaut)
- Kiviryan Harutyunovich (cosmonaut)
- Roman Starovoyt (Minister of Transport of Russia from May 2024 to July 2025)
- Vladimir Yakunin (head of Russian Railways)
- Vladimir Okrepilov (academician of Russian Academy of Sciences RAS, general director of State Centre "Test-St.Petersburg")
