= Academic graduation badge =

Academic graduation badge (Russian: Академический нагрудный знак) is a badge of distinction worn on the chest for individuals who have graduated from a higher education institution.

== History ==
=== Russian Empire ===
Chest badges for graduation from educational institutions appeared in the Russian Empire in the 19th century. At first, badges of distinction were established for individuals who graduated from military academies of the Russian Empire, which gave rise to the term "academic badges". Among civilian educational institutions, the first special badges of this kind were established for individuals who were awarded master's and doctoral degrees by the Imperial Russian Universities. In 1889, a badge was introduced for those who completed courses at the Imperial Russian Universities. The sample badge that appeared in 1899 became the prototype of modern academic badges. It was an elongated vertical enamel rhombus topped with a double-headed eagle. A blue enamel cross with a laurel wreath on top was located on top of the rhombus.

=== USSR ===
The revolutions (February and October coups) of 1917 led to the abolition of previous awards and badges of distinction. However, in 1940, vocational schools were established in the USSR, upon completion of which a badge was issued in the form of a small, slightly convex rhombus covered in blue enamel with white enamel stripes along the edges and gilded sides. In the center of the badge, against a background of blue enamel, was a symbolic image of a branch of the national economy.

On September 4, 1945, by decree of the Presidium of the Supreme Soviet of the USSR, breast badges were introduced for persons who graduated from state universities. The badge in the form of a blue rhombus covered in enamel in a white border with gilded sides and a superimposed image of the Soviet coat of arms was supposed to be worn on the right side of the chest below the orders and medals of the USSR.

In accordance with the resolution of the Council of Ministers No. 1375 of December 20, 1958, badges were established for graduation from other higher and secondary specialized educational institutions. By the Order of the Ministry of Higher and Secondary Specialized Education of the USSR No. 123 of April 8, 1961 "On the introduction of academic badges for graduates of Soviet higher educational institutions" a uniform form of academic badges of the USSR was established. According to the description attached to the order, "the academic badge for persons who graduated from Soviet higher educational institutions has the shape of a slightly convex rhombus, covered with enamel of a color depending on the type of higher educational institution, with white enamel stripes bordered by golden edges located on the edge of the rhombus. In the upper part of the badge, against the background of enamel, an overhead golden image of the USSR coat of arms is placed. In the academic badge of universities, the overhead gilded image of the USSR coat of arms is placed in the center of the badge. The emblem of the higher educational institution of this type is placed in the lower part of the badge. On the reverse side of the badge there is a screw with a nut for attaching the badge to clothing. The size of the badge was also set at 46 mm vertically and 26 mm wide. Similar chest badges, but with a hexagonal shield, measuring 40 × 25.5 mm and without the name "academic" have been established since 1966 for graduates of secondary specialized educational institutions with secondary specialized education, including for graduates who graduated from secondary specialized educational institutions earlier this year, upon their application and confirmation of education.

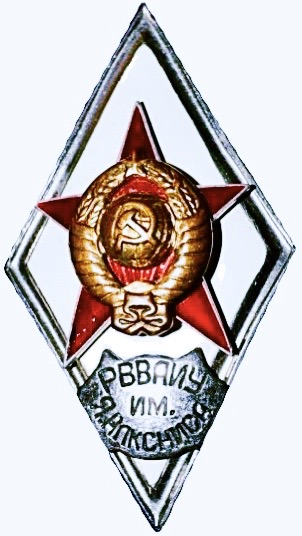
Academic badge of students who graduated from the Riga Higher Military Aviation Engineering School, class of 1972

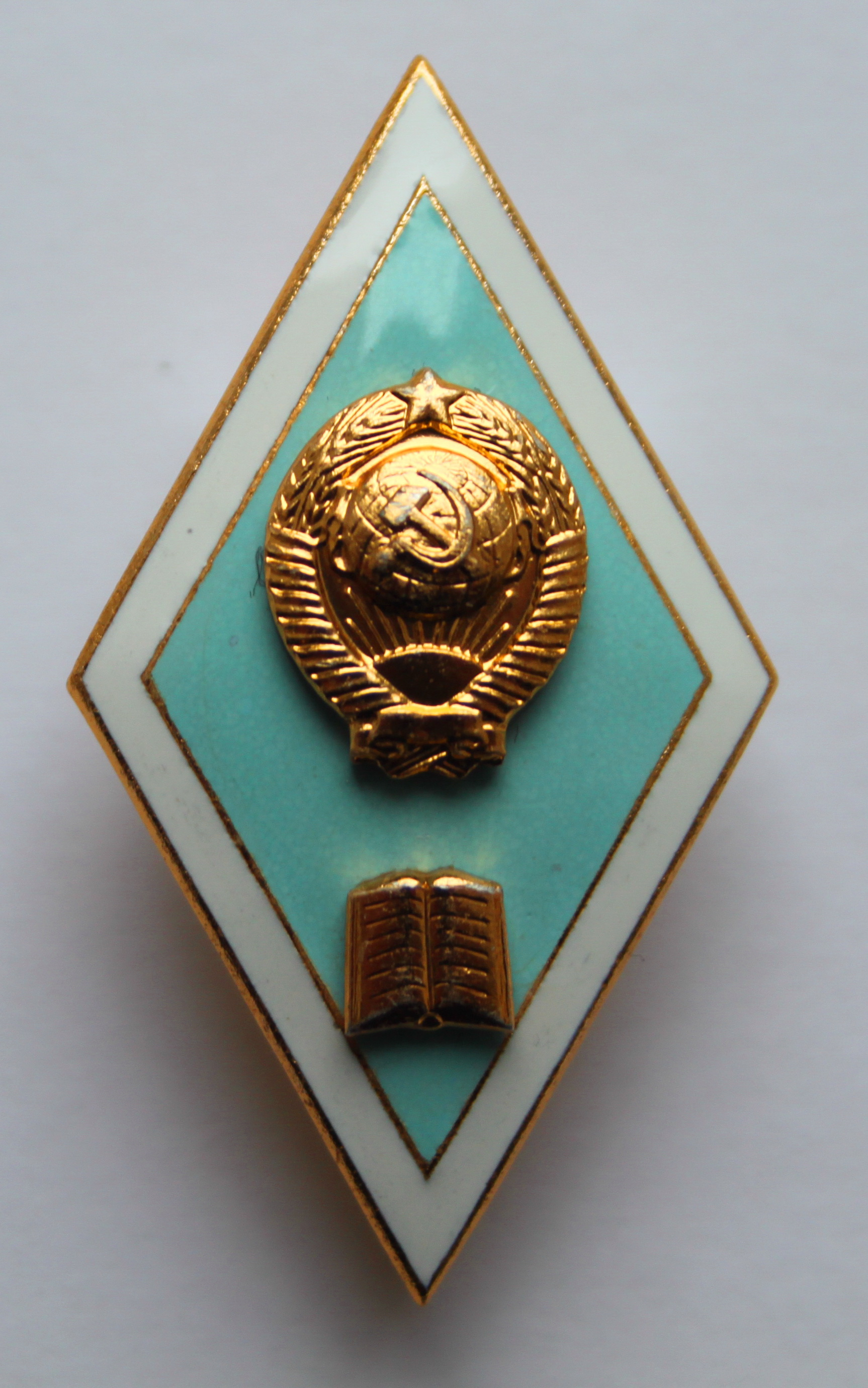
Badge of a graduate of a pedagogical university

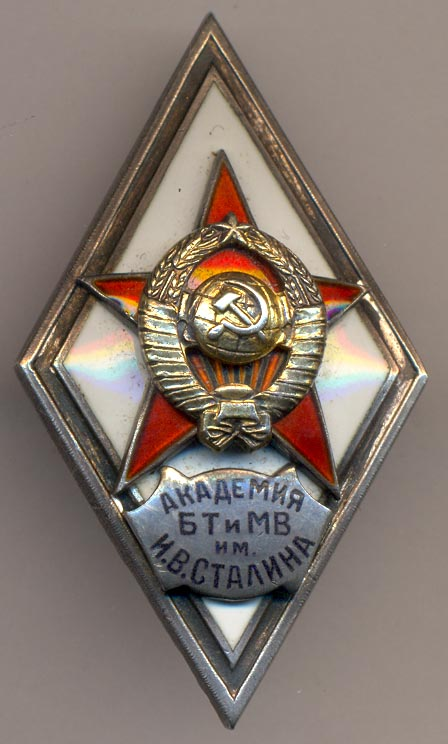
Badge for persons who graduated from higher military educational institutions of the Soviet Armed Forces - military academies (and equivalent), model 1950

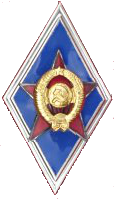
Badge of a graduate of a higher military educational institution (institute, higher military school)

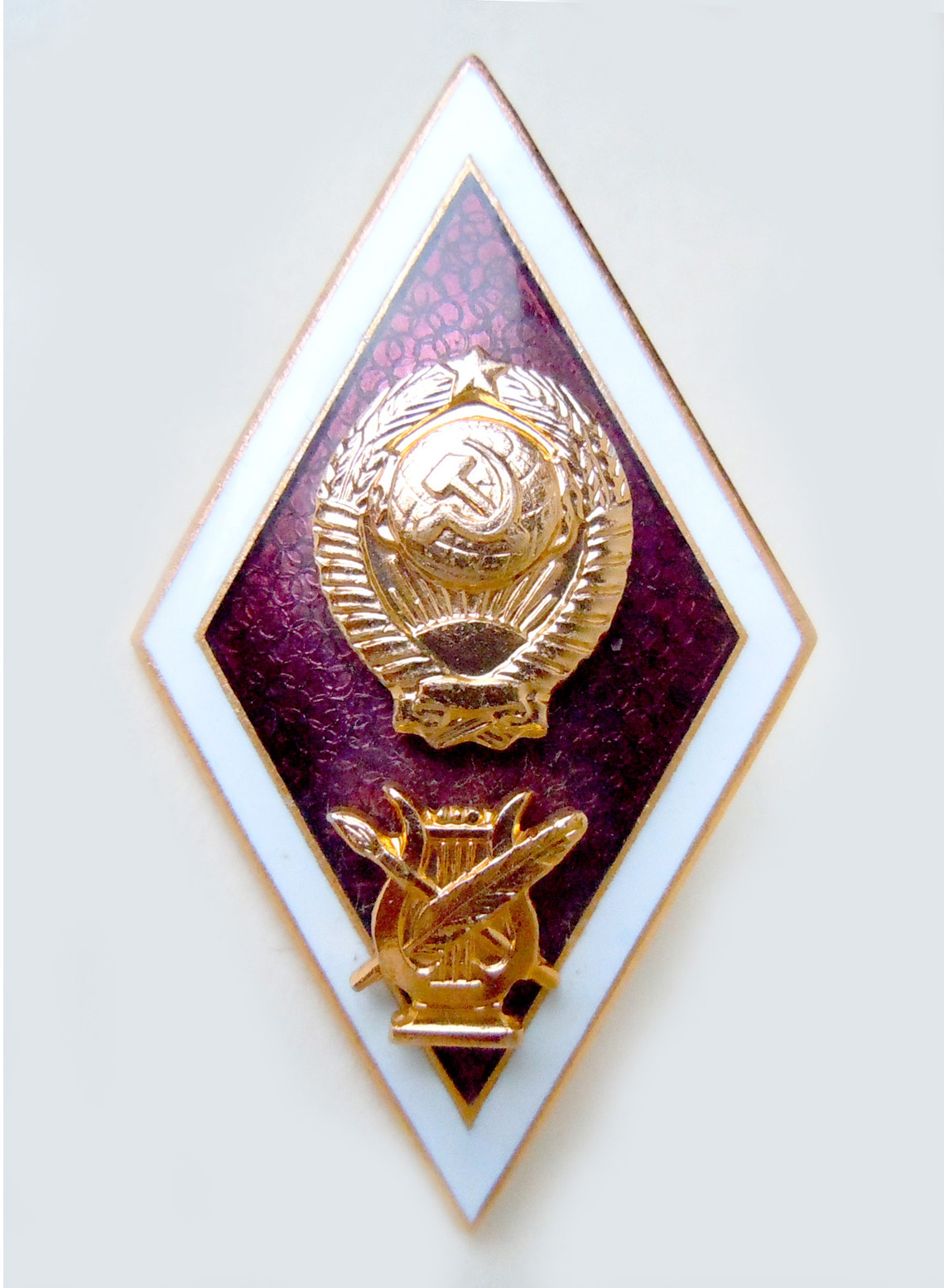
Badge of the graduate of a university of arts

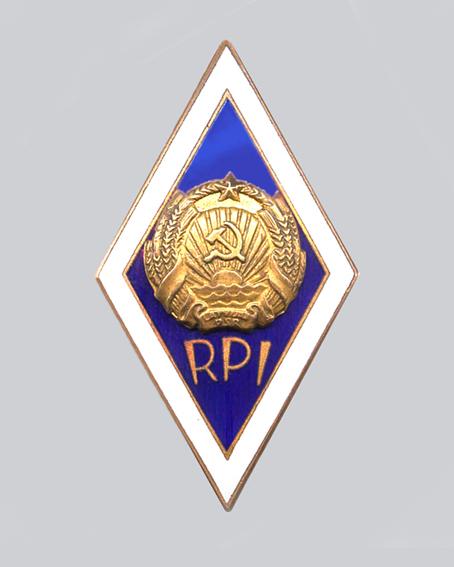
Riga Polytechnic Institute graduate badge

=== Modern Russia ===
After the collapse of the USSR, as part of the abolition of regulatory legal acts of the USSR, the previously valid provisions on education badges lost their force, since 2013 - on graduation from secondary vocational educational institutions (by order of the Ministry of Education and Science of the Russian Federation dated November 29, 2013 No. 1296 "On the recognition of certain legal acts of the USSR as invalid on the territory of the Russian Federation and the recognition of certain legal acts of the RSFSR in the field of education as invalid"), since 2016 - academic on graduation from a higher educational institution (by order of the Ministry of Education and Science of the Russian Federation dated May 25, 2016 No. 620 "On the recognition of certain legal acts of the RSFSR as invalid and the recognition of certain legal acts of the USSR in the field of education as invalid on the territory of the Russian Federation"). However, many universities traditionally continue to award badges to their graduates. Post-Soviet academic badges generally continued to follow Soviet regulations, with Soviet symbols replaced by Russian ones and the addition of elements of the educational institution's symbols. In the early post-Soviet period of the Russian Federation, in the 1990s, Soviet-style educational badges were issued.

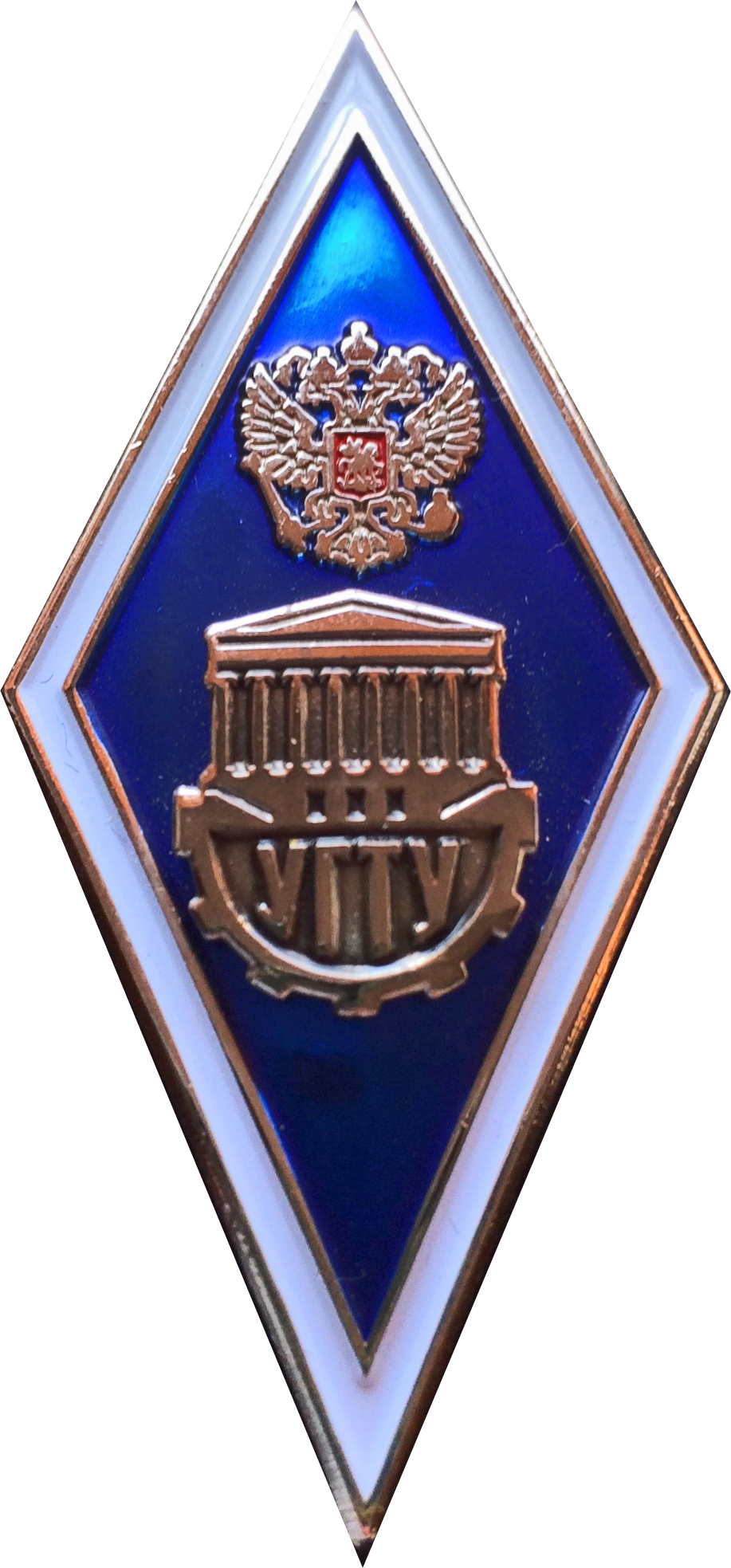
Russian academic badge of Ural State Technical University graduate

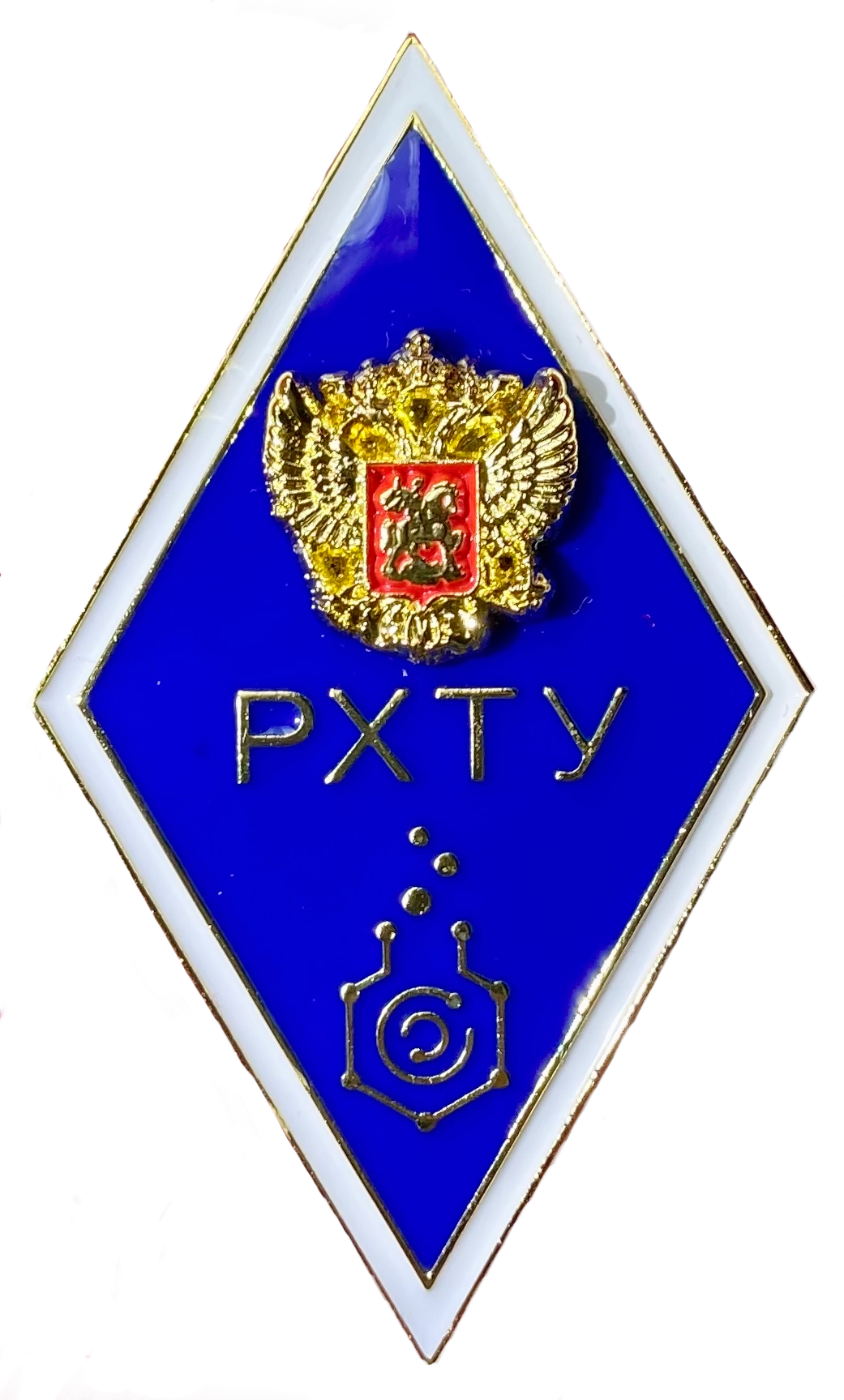
Russian academic badge of the Graduate of the Mendeleev University of Chemical Technology of Russia

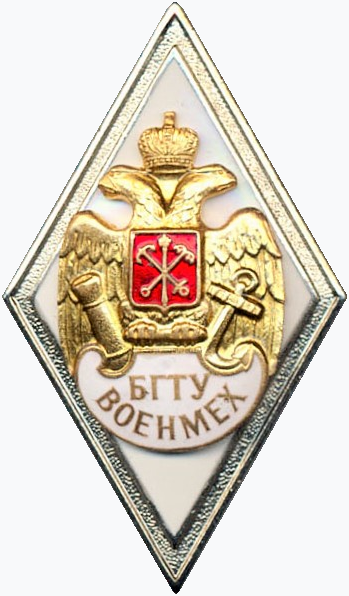
Russian academic badge of a graduate of the Baltic State Technical University
