= Federal Service for Supervision of Transport =

Russian government agency

- Федеральная служба по надзору в сфере транспорта
- Emblem of the Federal Service for Supervision of Transport

Federal Agency overview
- Formed: March 9, 2004
- Jurisdiction: Ministry of Transport
- Headquarters: Leningradsky Avenue, 37/1, Moscow, Russia
- Federal Agency executive: Viktor Gulin
- Website: rostransnadzor.gov.ru

The Federal Service for Supervision of Transport (Russian: Федеральная служба по надзору в сфере транспорта, Rostransnadzor, Ространснадзор) is an agency of the Government of Russia. The agency is headquartered in Moscow. It was formed in 2004 as a result of government reforms which moved supervisory functions out of several agencies into a new one.

As of 2013, Alexander Kasyanov was the head of the agency. The Rostrasnadzor oversees and supervises several aspects of Russia's transport network.

Rostransnadzor has several agencies, according to the type of transport:

- Goszheldornadzor (railroad transport)
- Gosavtodornadzor (automobile transport)
- Gosmorrechnadzor (sea and river transport)
- Gosavianadzor (aviation transport)
- Transport safety
