= Elena Vesna =

Russian psychologist

- Born: November 12, 1962
- Education: Vitus Bering Kamchatka State University
- Scientific career
- Workplaces: Vitus Bering Kamchatka State University; Psychological Institute of Russian Academy of Education; National Research Nuclear University MEPhI

Elena Borisovna Vesna (Russian: Елена Борисовна Весна; born 12 November 1962) is a Russian psychologist. Since 2011 she works as a Vice-rector on Educational Affairs in National Research Nuclear University MEPhI.

== Early life and career ==
Graduated from Vitus Bering Kamchatka State University (former Kamchatka State Pedagogical University), earning diploma with honors in Psychology and Russian language and literature. Received a PhD in Psychological Institute of Russian Academy of Education.

== Professional experience ==
Elena Vesna started her professional career at Psychological Institute of Russian Academy of Education working as research assistant, senior lecturer, docent, professor; worked as a head of Theoretical and Applied Psychology Department in Vitus Bering Kamchatka State University. Between 1999 and 2008 she held several administrative positions in Vitus Bering Kamchatka State University including: Vice-rector on educational affairs, Vice-rector on educational and international affairs, First Vice-rector, Vice-rector on educational affairs, innovative and international activities. Her career in MEPhI started in 2008. In the period between 2008 and 2011 she served as the head of Modern educational technologies development center and head of Educational office (as a Vice-rector of MEPhI). In 2011 she was officially appointed the Vice-rector on educational affairs.

== Scientific career ==
Elena Vesna is the author of 76 scientific papers, including 8 monographs and 4 study guides. The scope of her scientific interests includes various areas of psychology (personality psychology, general psychology, ethnopsychology, developmental psychology (in extreme conditions), industrial psychology), university management and university's research, educational and innovative activity governance. Under her supervision 20 PhD theses and 1 Doctoral thesis on psychology were successfully presented.

== Awards ==
Elena Vesna is a doctor of science in the field of psychology, Professor, member of Expert council on pedagogics and psychology of Higher Attestation Commission. She is a laureate of the following awards:

- Honoured Worker of Higher Education of the Russian Federation
- Honoured Worker of science and technology of the Russian Federation
- The order "For Merit to the Fatherland", II class
- Diploma of Merit, Ministry of Education and Science
- Diploma of Merit, Federal Service for Financial Monitoring
- Medal for contribution to the development of nuclear industry
