= State Air Traffic Management Corporation =

Russian air navigation service provider

Coordinates: 55°47′32″N 37°32′23″E

State Air Traffic Management Corporation Государственная корпорация по организации воздушного движения в Российской Федерации
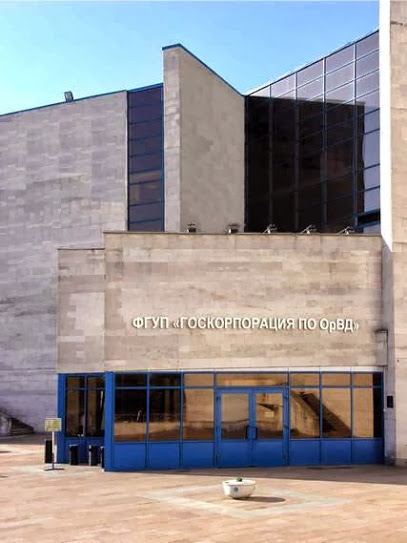
- Company type: Unitary enterprise
- Industry: Aviation
- Founded: May 14, 1996; 30 years ago
- Founder: Government of Russia
- Headquarters: Moscow, Russia
- Products: Navigation services
- Revenue: 93,144,000,000 Russian ruble (2017)
- Net income: 32,800,000,000 Russian ruble (2018)
- Total assets: 165,400,000,000 Russian ruble (2018)
- Number of employees: 29,358 (2018)
- Parent: Federal Air Transport Agency
- Website: www.gkovd.ru

State Air Traffic Management Corporation in the Russian Federation (Russian: Федеральное государственное унитарное предприятие «Государственная корпорация по организации воздушного движения в Российской Федерации») is an organization providing air navigation services in Russia. It was established in accordance with the decree of the Government of the Russian Federation of May 14, 1996 No. 583.

It is a subordinate organization of the Federal Air Transport Agency (Rosaviatsia) and provides state air navigation services on its behalf in accordance with the administrative regulations. From 2005 to 2009, the enterprise's activities were supervised by the Federal Air Navigation Service.

== Operations ==
The Federal State Unitary Enterprise State Air Traffic Management Corporation creates and maintains air navigation infrastructure in Russia, and also carries out business activities (provides services) in the field of air traffic management through its structural divisions, which are entrusted with the powers of operational bodies of the unified air traffic management system.

The provider's area of responsibility extends over an area of more than 26 million km2 (over the territory of Russia and neutral waters, where responsibility for air traffic management is assigned to the Russian Federation in accordance with international treaties), the total length of air traffic service routes exceeds 800 thousand km. On average, about 1,000 aircraft are under management at the same time, and per year the enterprise services more than 1.6 million flights of aircraft of Russian and foreign airlines. FSUE State Air Traffic Management Corporation is a member of the Coordination Council (CC) "Eurasia", which includes eight national providers (performers) of air navigation services of the post-Soviet states (Belarus, Russia, Kazakhstan, Uzbekistan, Tajikistan, Kyrgyzstan, Armenia, Azerbaijan).
