= Aleksandr Baldin =

Aleksandr Mikhailovich Baldin (Russian: Александр Михайлович Балдин) (February 26, 1926, Moscow – April 29, 2001) was a Soviet and Russian physicist, expert in the field of physics of elementary particles and high energy physics.

After finishing the railway technical school, he studied in the Moscow Institute of Engineers and Transport, followed by a DSc program in Moscow Engineering Physics Institute completing in 1949, when he became a professor in Lebedev Physical Institute. In 1968, he was named the director of Laboratory of High Energy Physics in the Institute for Nuclear Research (ОИЯИ) in Dubna, where the Soviet nuclear weapons were developed. He was elected a member of Russian Academy of Sciences and a faculty of Moscow State University. He was the co-designer of the project of synchrophasotron ОИЯИ (1949). He received the Lenin Prize (1988).

== Biography ==
He graduated from the railway technical school, and then entered to the Moscow State University of Railway Engineering. In 1946, as an excellent student, he was invited to continue his studies at the Moscow Engineering Physics Institute (MEPI). After graduation in 1949, he was sent to the Lebedev Physical Institute of the Academy of Sciences of the USSR (PIAS), where he later defended his PhD and became a professor.

In 1952, he became a master of sports in mountaineering and the champion of the USSR.

He was chairman of the Council on Electromagnetic Interactions of the Russian Academy of Sciences, a member of the Bureau of the Nuclear Physics Division of the Russian Academy of Sciences, chief editor of the journal Elementary Particles and Atomic Nuclei (EPAN) and “ Letters to EPAN”, the member of the editorial boards of many scientific publications. He organized several international seminar on High Energy Physics (since 1969).
