= Moscow Engineering Physics Institute =

Public technical university in Moscow

National Research Nuclear University MEPhI
- Former names: Moscow Mechanical Institute of Munitions (1942–1953); Moscow Engineering Physics Institute (1953–2009)
- Type: Public
- Established: 1942
- Rector: Vladimir Igorevich Shevchenko
- Location: Moscow, Russia; 55°38′59″N 37°39′52″E
- Website: mephi.ru

General information
- Completed: 1962

University rankings

Global – Overall
- QS World: =591 (2026)

Regional – Overall
- QS Emerging Europe and Central Asia: 34 (2022)

National Research Nuclear University MEPhI, (Note: (Russian: Национальный исследовательский ядерный университет "МИФИ")) formerly known as Moscow Engineering Physics Institute, is a public technical university in Moscow, Russia. It was founded in 1942 as the Moscow Mechanical Institute of Munitions, but was soon renamed the Moscow Mechanical Institute. Its original mission was to train skilled personnel for the Soviet military and Soviet atomic bomb project. It was renamed the Moscow Engineering Physics Institute in 1953, which was its name until 2009.

By the Order of the Government of Russia on April 8, 2009 (#480-r) on behalf of Russian President's Decree of October 7, 2008 (#1448) "On the pilot project launching on creating National Research Universities" MEPhI was granted this new status. The university was reorganized. The aim of the university existence is now preparing the specialists by giving them higher professional, post-graduation professional, secondary professional and additional professional education, as well as educational and scientific activities.

In 2022, QS World University rankings rated the university #308 in the world, World University Rankings by Times Higher Education ranked the university #401 in the world, and in 2023 U.S. News & World Report rated the university #483 in the world.

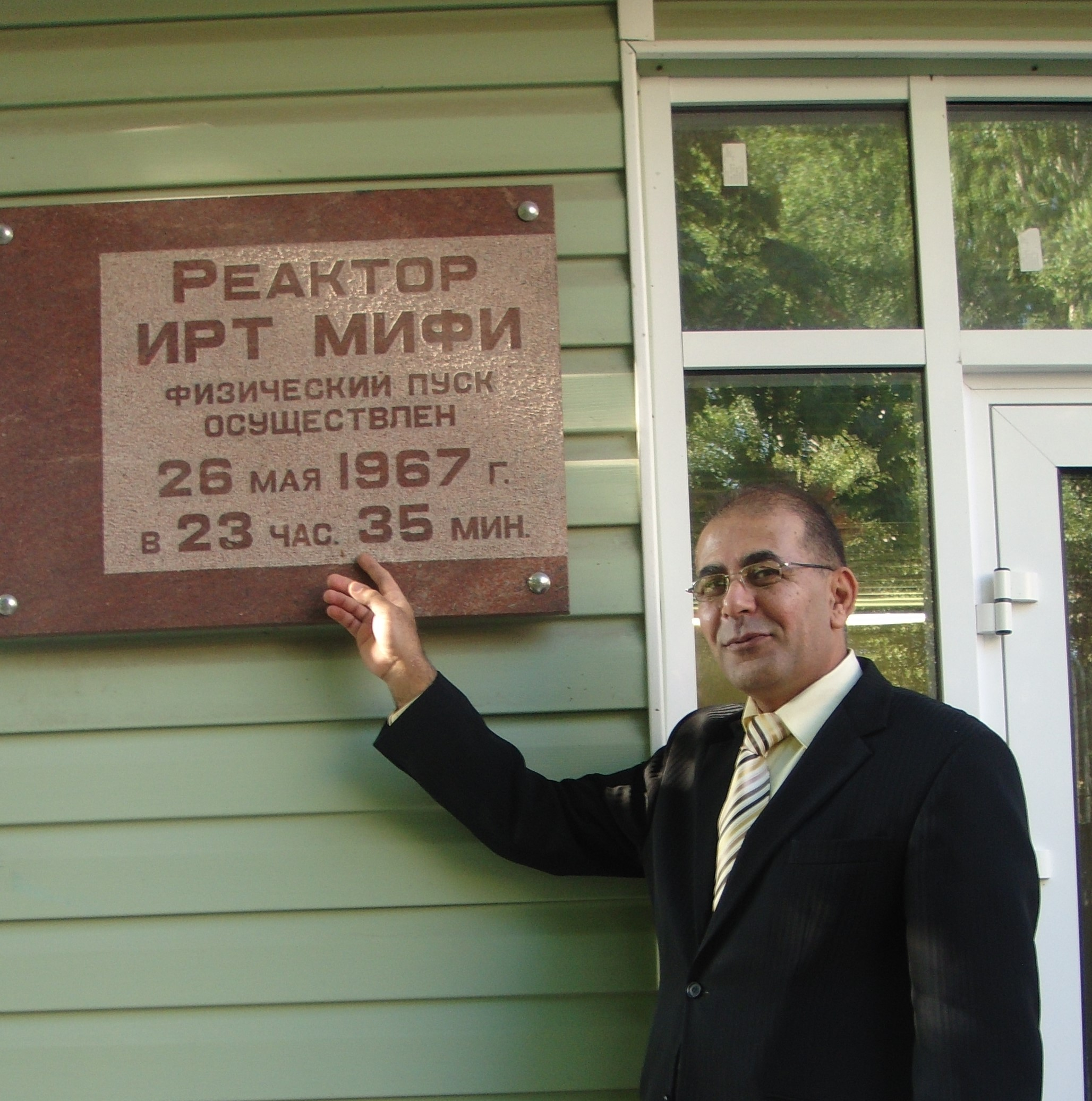
MEPHI University Reactor startup May 26, 1967 at 23:36

== Academics ==
Today, MEPhI has eleven main departments (faculties or institutes):

- Institute of Nuclear Physics and Engineering
- Institute for Laser and Plasma Technologies
- Institute of Engineering Physics for Biomedicine
- Institute of Nanoengineering in Electronics, Spintronics and Photonics
- Institute of Cyber Intelligence Systems
- Institute of Financial Technology and Economic Security
- Institute of International Relations
- Institute of Cyber-Physical Systems
- Institute of General Professional Competencies
- Higher Engineering School
- Faculty of Business Informatics and Complex Systems Management

The university offers bachelor, masters (and similar degree 'Specialist'), and post-graduate degrees in physics, mathematics, computer science and other areas. MEPhI facilities include a 2.5 MW (thermal) pool-type research reactor and Neutrino Water Detector NEVOD. The university has about 35,000 students at branches in Moscow and other towns. In Moscow are around 7,500 students (including over 1300 foreigners). It normally takes 4 – 5.5 (some sub-departments take six) years for a student to graduate from MEPhI. The curriculum of the first two years consists exclusively of required courses (core), with emphasis on mathematics, physics, experimental work and English. After the two first years of studying students on a competition basis enroll in the sub-departments which specialize in different branches of physics, computer science, information security, mathematics, etc.

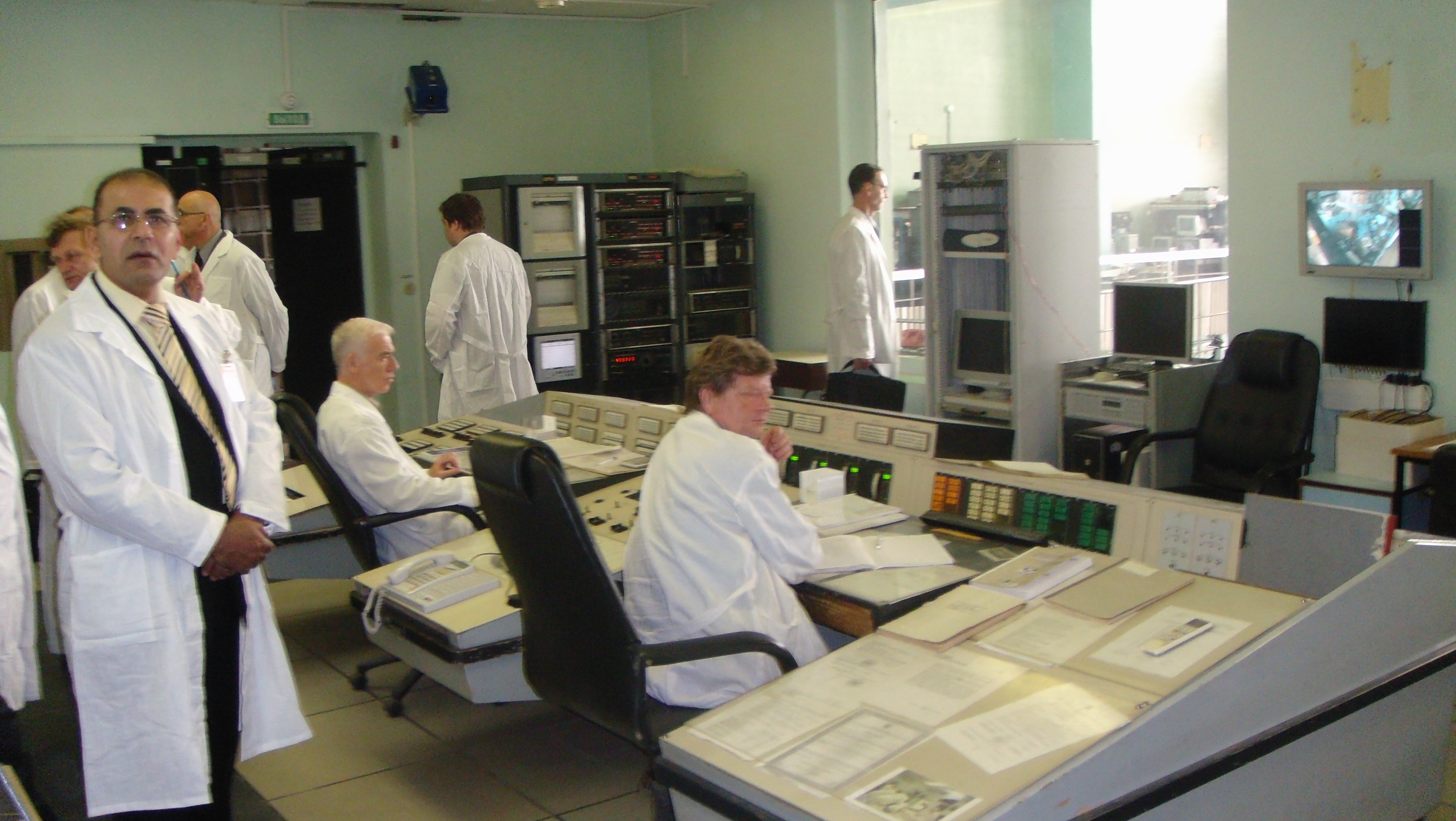
MEPhi Nuclear Reactor Control Room

== Rankings ==
In 2022, QS World University rankings rated the university #308 in the world, World University Rankings by Times Higher Education ranked the university #401 in the world, and in 2023 U.S. News & World Report rated the university #483 in the world.

Global Ranking	MEPhI Rank among Russian universities (World Rank)											
Global Ranking	2012	2013	2014	2015	2016	2017	2018	2019	2020	2021	2025	2026
ARWU — Academic Ranking of World Universities								5 (601–700)	5 (701–800)			
ARWU — ShanghaiRanking's Global Ranking of Academic Subjects — Physics						3 (201–300)	3 (151–200)	=2 (101–150)	4 (151–200)	4 (151–200)		
ARWU — ShanghaiRanking's Global Ranking of Academic Subjects — Energy Science & Engineering							401–500	2 (401—500)	2 (301–400)			
ARWU — ShanghaiRanking's Global Ranking of Academic Subjects — Instruments Science & Technology							201–300					
THE — World University Rankings		2 (226–250)			3 (251–300)	4 (401–500)	5 (401–500)	4 (351–400)	=3 (401- 500)	6 (401–500)		
THE — Physical Sciences			3 (74)	3 (95)	1 (36)	2 (84)	2 (89)	2 (78)	3 (101–125)	3 (98)		
THE — Computer Science							4 (201–250)	=4 (201—250)	=5 (301–400)	7 (401–500)		
THE — Engineering and Technology							6 (401–500)	=6 (401—500)	8 (401–500)	9 (501–600)		
THE —Emerging Economies Rankings				2 (13)	4 (26)	3 (19)	3 (19)	2 (16)	4 (27)	4 (28)		
THE — Best universities in Europe					5 (161–170)	5 (200)			6 (401–500)			
THE — Most international universities in the world							4 (159)			3 (118)		
THE – University Impact Rankings: industry, innovation and infrastructure								2 (48)		6 (101–200)		
QS — World University Rankings				(481–490)	10 (501–550)	9 (401–410)	7 (373)	8 (329)	8 (314)	9 (319)		
QS — Physics & Astronomy			4 (251–300)	2 (51–100)	2 (51–100)	4 (51–100)	2 (51–100)	= 2 (51–100)	= 2 (51–100)	3 (86)		
QS — Natural Science						5 (213)	5 (146)	5 (165)	5 (149)	5 (159)		
QS — Engineering — Electrical & Electronic					4 (251–300)	4 (251–300)	5 (301–350)	=5 (301—350)	5 (301–350)	7 (351–400)		
QS — Computer Science & Information Systems							9 (451–500)	9 (401—450)	9 (401–450)	9 (351–400)		
QS — Engineering and Technology						8 (401–450)	9 (396)	10 (290)	10 (285)	10 (307)		
QS — BRICS (since 2020 the ranking has not been published)				9 (57)	8 (51)	8 (50)	7 (35)	6 (30)				
QS — Emerging Europe and Central Asia				8 (34)	5 (22)	7 (25)	7 (23)	7 (26)	7 (24)	8 (28)		
Webometrics			4 (641)	4 (859)	5	5 (802)	5 (779)	8 (764)		4 (561)		
U.S. News & World Report — Best Global Universities Rankings					2 (465)	2	2 (438)	2 (419)	2 (388)	3 (402)		
U.S. News & World Report — Best Global Universities for Physics					127	117	3 (90)	3 (76)	2 (51)	3 (42)		
U-Multirank. Top 25 Performing Universities in Student Mobility					1 (14)	1 (14)	1 (3)	1 (5)	1 (2)			
Moscow International University Ranking The Three University Missions						5 (131)		5 (154)	5 (147)			
RUR — Nuclear Education and Technology											1 (4)	1 (4)
RUR — Round University Rankings				2	2	2 (231)	2 (224)	2 (157)	2 (121)	2 (101)		
RUR — Natural Sciences				1 (158)	1 (145)	1 (115)	1 (52)	1 (46)	1 (42)	1 (40)		1 (74)
RUR — Teaching Ranking, Natural Sciences				1 (41)	3 (113)	1 (55)	3 (43)	1 (18)	2 (32)	7 (113)		
RUR — Life Sciences							13 (414)		10 (385)			
MIA “Russia Today” — National Engineering Universities Ranking				1	1	1		1				
MIA “Russia Today” — Russian Universities from Students Perspective					3	1	1	1	1	1		
Russian university ranking, announced by the international news agency Interfax	5–6	3	3	2	2	2	2	2	2			
The ranking agency "Expert RA"/ RAEX (Russia)				3	3	3	3	3	3	3		
SuperJob — IT-graduates by income level Ranking					2	2	3	5		2		
Forbes — Best Russian Universities								2	5			

== Student population ==
The student population is predominantly male. During the first years from MEPhI's foundation there was a ban against accepting women. In recent years this situation has changed.

== Location ==
It is a 15-minute walk (or a five-minute bus ride) from the university to the Kashirskaya station on the Zamoskvoretskaya Line of the Moscow Metro.

== Online resources ==
During 2016–18 MEPhI increased its presence in online educational platforms, namely Coursera, edX, Universarium and CLP4NET. By the end of 2018, MEPhI had provided 43 courses via those platforms, including 25 on Coursera and 11 on edX. In 2018, the number of students that joined MEPhI's online courses on the online platforms reached approximately 160,000 persons from 150 countries.

== Notable people ==
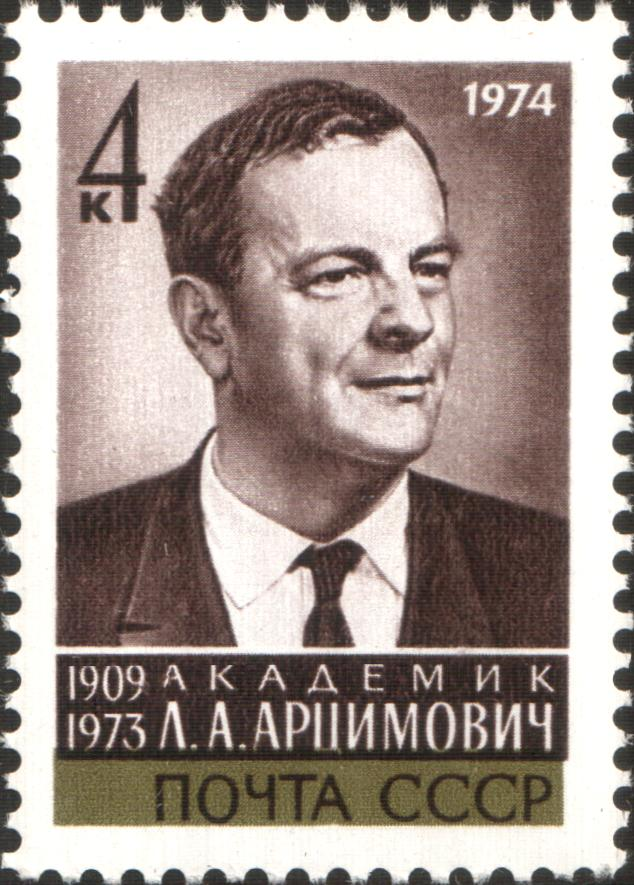
Lev Artsimovich

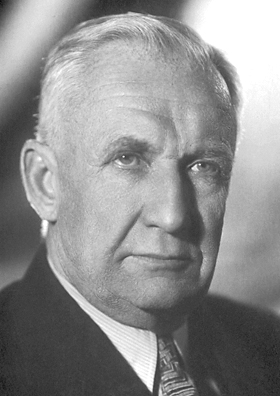
Igor Tamm

- Nicolay Gennadiyevich Basov (Николай Геннадиевич Басов) – Nobel Prize
- Pavel Cherenkov (Павел Алексеевич Черенков) – Nobel Prize
- Ilya Mikhailovich Frank (Илья Михайлович Франк) – Nobel Prize
- Andrey Dmitrievich Sakharov (Андрей Дмитриевич Сахаров) – Nobel Prize
- Nikolay Nikolayevich Semyonov (Николай Николаевич Семёнов) – Nobel Prize
- Igor Tamm (Игорь Евгеньевич Тамм) – Nobel Prize
- Mukhtar Ablyazov (Мухтар Аблязов) – leader "Democratic choice of Kazakhstan", former minister of Energy, Industry and Trade in Kazakhstan (21 April 1998 – October 1999)
- Lev Artsimovich (Лев Арцимович) – known as "the father of the Tokamak"
- Sergei Avdeyev (Сергей Васильевич Авдеев) – engineer and cosmonaut, record for time spent in space: 747.59 days
- Alexander Mikhajlovich Baldin (Александр Михайлович Балдин)
- Anatoly Ivanovich Larkin (Анатолий Иванович Ларкин)
- Andrei Badalov (Андре́й Ю́рьевич Бада́лов) – Vice President of Transneft
- Alexander Balankin (Александр Сергеевич Баланкин)
- Anatoly Stepanovich Dyatlov (Анатолий Степанович Дятлов) – physicist
- Igor Kurchatov (Игорь Васильевич Курчатов) – Soviet physicist most known as the father of the Soviet nuclear weapons project.
- Lev Gor'kov (Горьков Лев Петрович)
- Evgenii Feinberg (Фейнберг Евгений Львович)
- Yuri Oganessian (Юрий Цолакович Оганесян) – element 118 in Periodic Table named oganesson in his honor
- Lev Okun (Лев Борисович Окунь)
- Igor Irodov – author of a series of handbooks on general physics.
- Dmitry Kholodov (Дмитрий Холодов) – Journalist who investigated corruption in the military and was assassinated on 17 October 1994
- Isaak Pomeranchuk (Исаак Яковлевич Померанчук)
- Vyacheslav Starshinov (Вячеслав Иванович Старшинов) – Olympic champion, world champion
- Elena Vesna – (Елена Борисовна Весна) psychologist and Vice-Rector of Educational Affairs.
- Leonid Toptunov – senior reactor control chief engineer at Chernobyl
- Anatoli Bugorski (Анатолий Петрович Бугорский) – survived a radiation accident involving a high energy beam
- Konstantin Krylov (Константин Крылов) – Russian nationalist writer and thinker.
