= Federal Road Agency =

Russian government agency

- Федеральное дорожное агентство
- Emblem

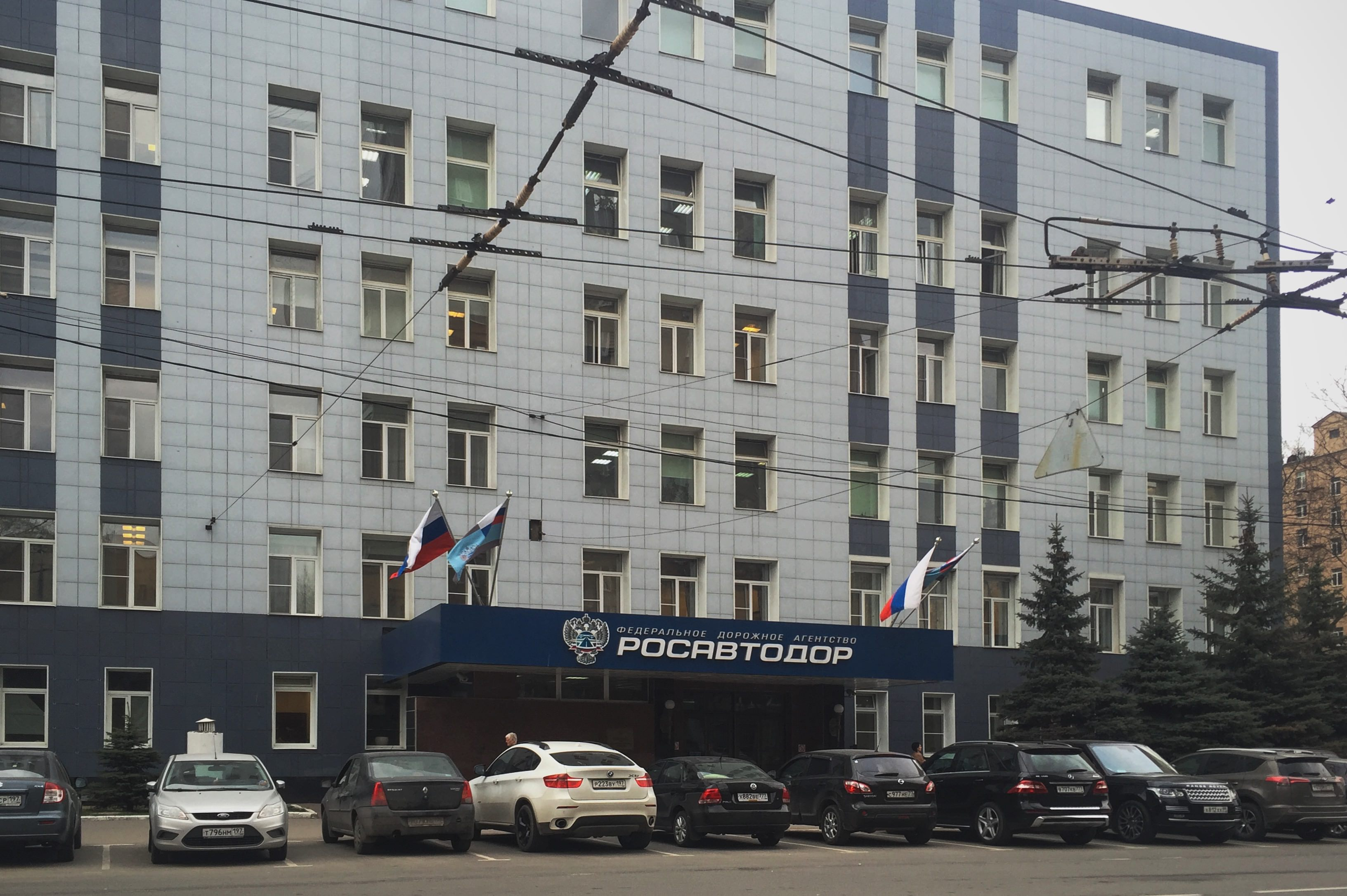
- Agency headquarters in Moscow

Federal Agency overview
- Formed: March 9, 2004
- Jurisdiction: Ministry of Transport
- Headquarters: Moscow, Russia
- Federal Agency executive: Roman Novikov
- Website: rosavtodor.gov.ru

The Federal Road Agency (Russian: Федеральное дорожное агентство; also known as Rosavtodor; Russian: Росавтодор) is the Russian government agency responsible for overseeing the road transport industry and transport engineering in Russia.

Federal Road Agency is a state body responsible for initiating of special federal, scientific and technical and innovation programs and projects including the “Roads” subordinate program of the “Modernization of Russian road system (years 2002-2010)” program.

Federal roads management is carried out by Federal Road Agency directly as well as through the system of federal state establishments and their branches, responsible for efficient federal roads management and for organizing of road construction, reconstruction, repair and maintenance works.

Control objects are 50.700 km of Federal roads, 5,560 bridges and overpasses plus all the property required to ensure uninterrupted all-the-year-round functioning of federal roads.

The total book cost of the property managed and controlled by Federal Road Agency is approximately 608.000 billion rubles.

Federal Road Agency operates in accordance with the Constitution of the Russian Federation, federal laws, decrees by the president of the Russian Federation, decrees and resolutions issued by the Russian Government, corresponding international agreements and orders and decrees by Ministry of Transport of the Russian Federation.

The Head of the Federal Road Agency is appointed or dismissed by the Russian Government at the suggestion of the Minister of Transport of the Russian Federation.

== Top ranks and uniforms ==
Civil servants who works in the Agency have class ranks in groups of 1, 2 and 3 classes, which correspond to the military rank. Class ranks are established by article 11 of the Federal Law of 07/07/2004 No. 79-“On the Civil Service of the Russian Federation” and the Decree of the President of the Russian Federation of 9.6.2006 No. 577.

Employees of the Federal Road Agency have universal uniforms, with rank insignia, approved by the Order of the Ministry of Transport of the Russian Federation “On Uniform and Insignia of Employees of the Federal Road Agency” (project ID 01/02 / 01-17 / 00061018, prepared by the Ministry of Transport of the Russian Federation 01.02.2017.
