= Saint Petersburg State University of Civil Aviation =

- Санкт-Петербургский государственный университет гражданской авиации
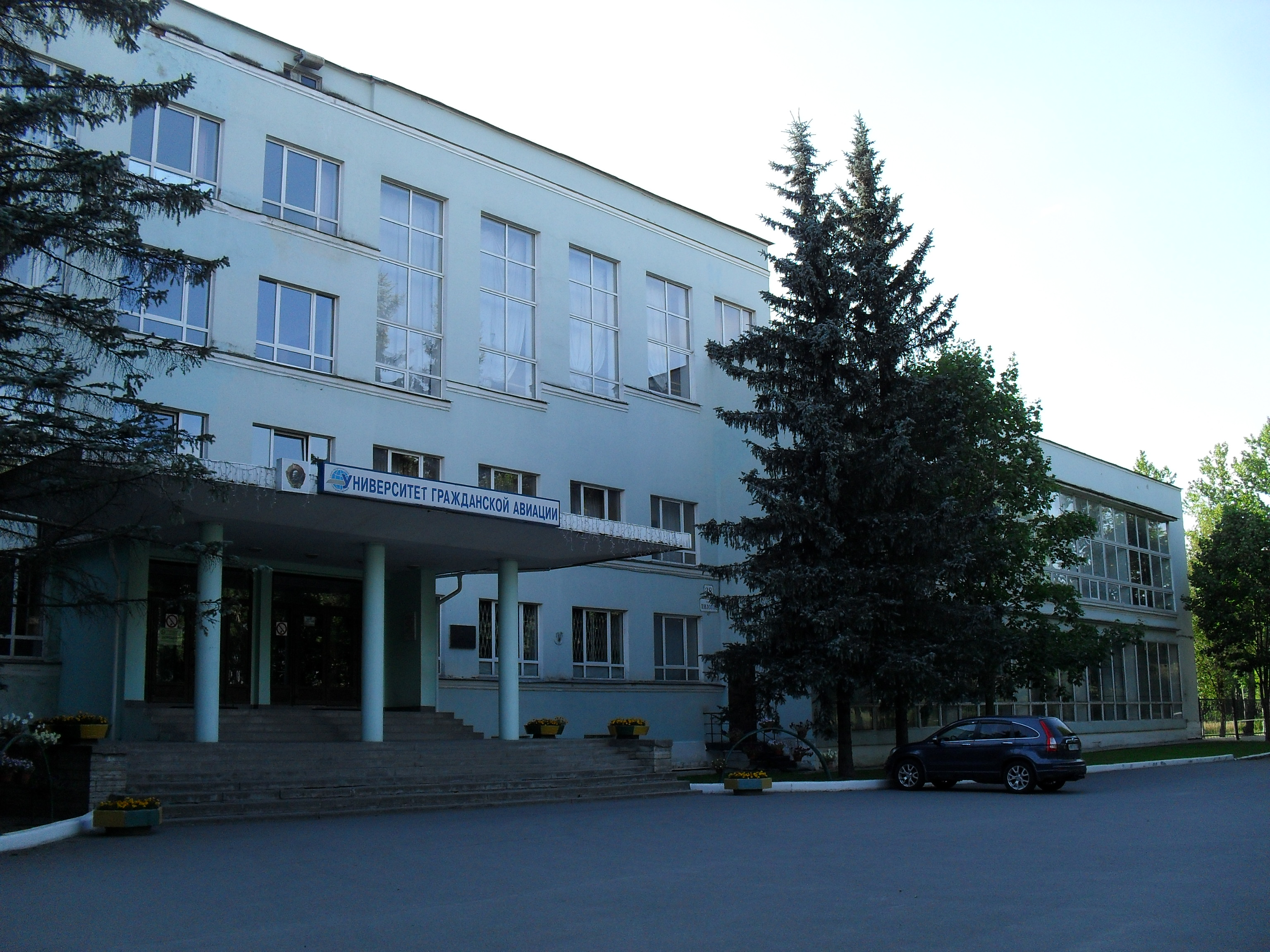
- Type: Public
- Established: 1955
- Rector: Mihail Smurov
- Location: 38, Pilotov Street, Saint Petersburg, Russia 196210, Saint Petersburg, Russia; 59°49′09″N 30°17′28″E
- Campus: suburban
- Website: www.spbguga.ru

The Saint Petersburg State University of Civil Aviation is an aviation school in Saint Petersburg, Russia.

== History ==
On 23 July 1955, the Council of Ministers of the Soviet Union issued a resolution No. 1329-755С ordering the creation of the institution to advance studies of senior commanding staff for Civil Aviation with supervision of the Civil Aviation Administration. This led to the birth of the "High School of Civil Aviation".

In 1971, the High school of Civil Aviation was awarded the highest government award that time—the "Order of Lenin". Thereafter the institute was reorganized as the "Academy of Civil Aviation" and it was moved to a new campus in Aviagorodok (Aviation town), a suburb of Leningrad next to present-day Pulkovo Airport.

In 2004, the Academy of Civil Aviation passed the state accreditation and has received a new status - Saint-Petersburg State University of Civil Aviation (Order of the Ministry of Education and Science on 01. December 2004, No. 461).

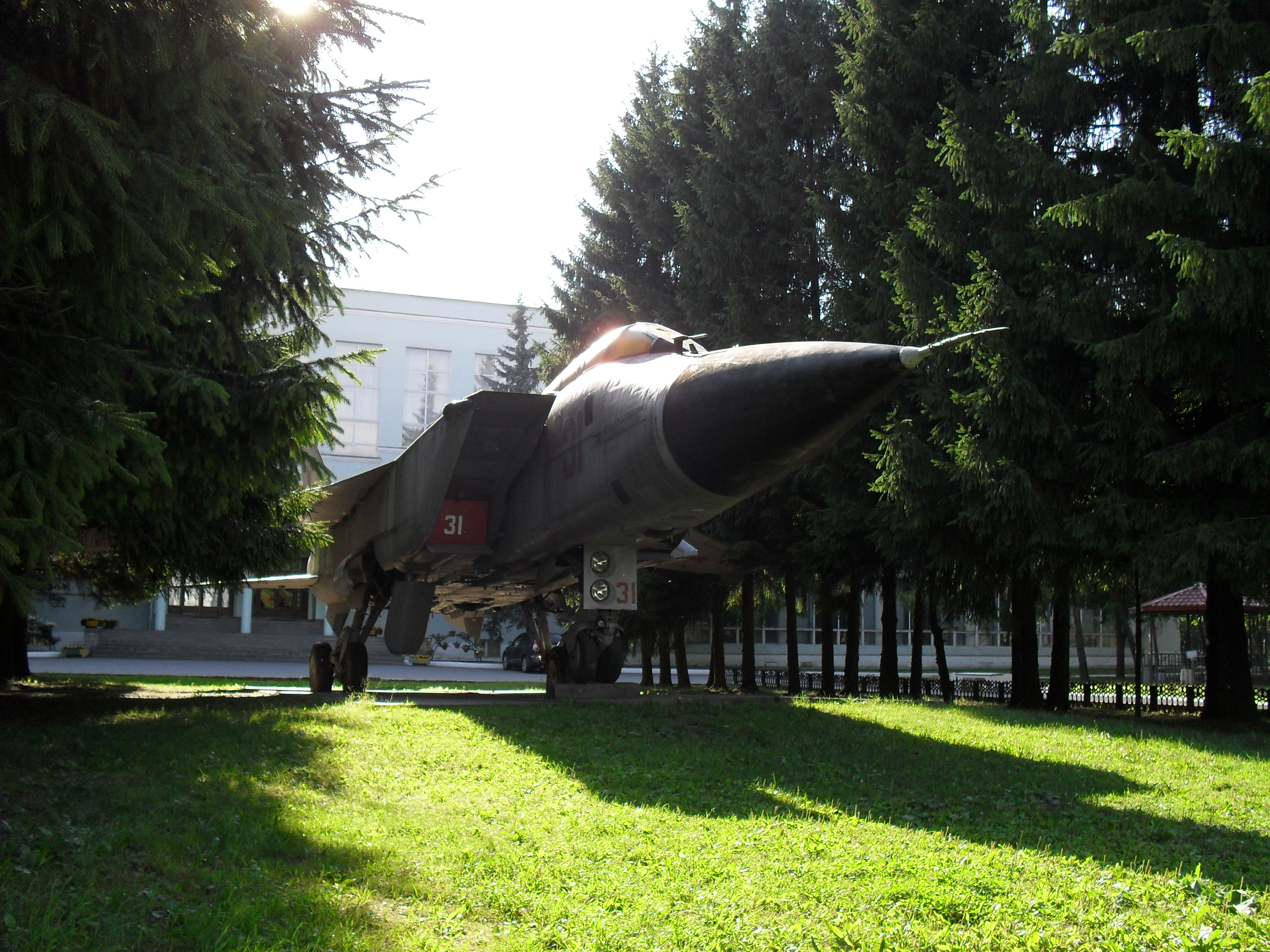
MiG-31 monument at entrance

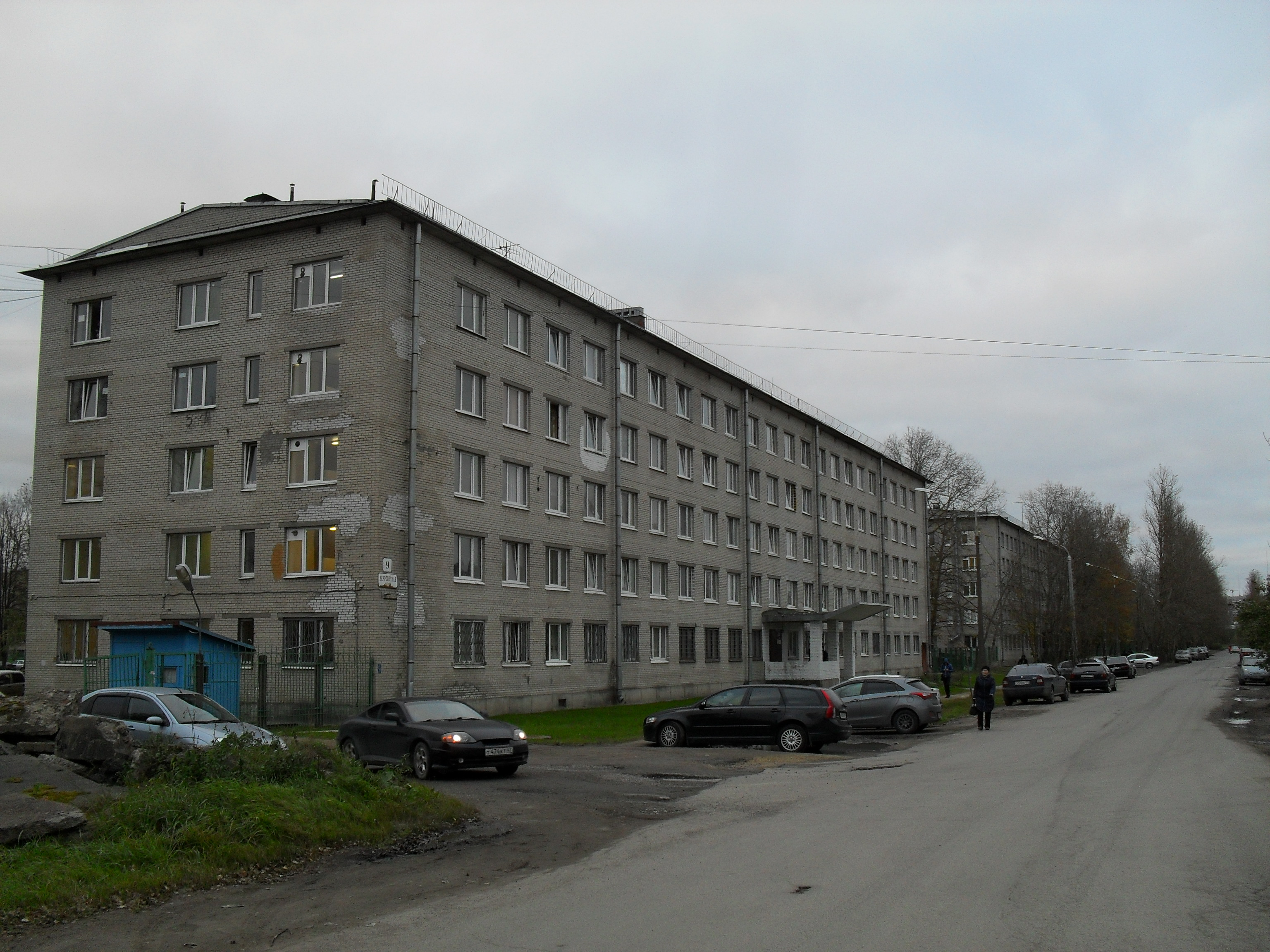
University campus in Aviagorodok at Pulkovo, Vertoletnaya street
