= Ministry of Transport (Russia) =

Government minister of Russia

Ministry of Transport of the Russian Federation
- Министерство транспорта Российской Федерации; Ministerstvo transporta Rossiiskoi Federatsii
- Ministry seal

- Official flag

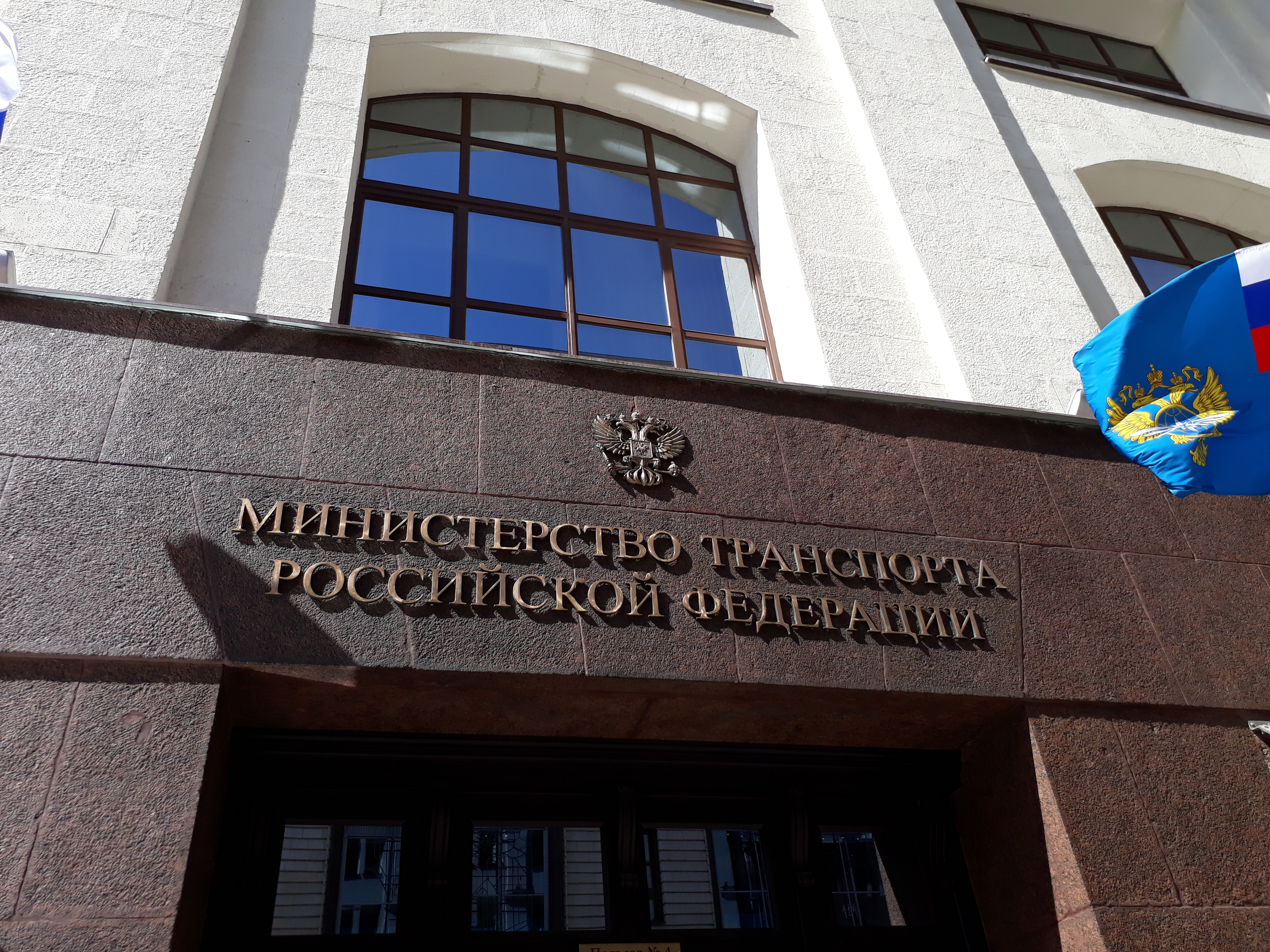
- Ministry headquarters in Moscow

Agency overview
- Formed: 1809
- Jurisdiction: Government of Russia
- Headquarters: 1/1 Rozhdestvenka, Moscow; 55°45′47.79″N 37°37′29.47″E
- Employees: 500
- Annual budget: 112,2 billion rubles
- Minister responsible: Dmitry Yadrov
- Child agencies: Federal Service for Supervision of Transport; Federal Air Transport Agency; Federal Road Agency; Federal Rail Transport Agency; Federal Agency for Maritime and River Transportation
- Website: mintrans.gov.ru

The Ministry of Transport of the Russian Federation (Russian: Министерство транспорта Российской Федерации, romanized: Ministerstvo transporta Rossiyskoy Federatsii) is a ministry of the Government of Russia responsible for transportation.

The Ministry of Transport oversees road transport, railroads, commercial aviation, sea transport, inland waterway transport, and urban metro systems in Russia. The ministry develops public policies and legal regulations, and also oversees the surveying, mapping, and naming of geographic features. The Ministry of Transport is headquartered in Meshchansky District, Moscow.

The Ministry of Transport was created in 1809 as the Ministry of Railway Transport of the Russian Empire and later became the People's Commissariat for Railways of the USSR. It was reformed into the Ministry of Railways in 1946 and later expanded its authority to become the Ministry of Transport of the USSR. It was re-established as the Ministry of Transport of the Russian Soviet Federative Socialist Republic after the collapse of the Soviet Union in 1991 and received its current name when the state was renamed to the Russian Federation on December 25, 1991. The Ministry of Transport was combined with the Ministry of Communications and Information for a brief period as short-lived Ministry of Transport and Communications from 9 March to 20 May 2004.

Andrei Nikitin has been the Minister of Transport since July 2025.

== Subordinate agencies ==
- Federal Service for Supervision of Transport ("Rostransnadzor"; Федеральная служба по надзору в сфере транспорта, Ространснадзор). Formed in 2004.
- Federal Air Transport Agency (FATA) ("Rosaviatsia"; Федеральное агентство воздушного транспорта, Росавиация). Formed in 1964 as Ministry for Civil Air Transport in Soviet Union, responsible for Inspection over the Civil Air Transport. Previous names: Department for Air Transport under the Transportation Ministry (1991–1995), Federal Air Service (1996–1998), Federal Service for Air Transport (1999), State Service for Civil Aviation (2000–2003), Since 2004 is carrying the current name.
- Federal Road Agency ("Rosavtodor"; Федеральное дорожное агентство, Росавтодор)
- Federal Rail Transport Agency ("Roszheldor"; Федеральное агентство железнодорожного транспорта), formed in 2004 on basis of the previous Railways Ministry which was dissolved.
- Federal Agency for Maritime and River Transportation ("Rosmorrechflot"; Федеральное агентство морского и речного транспорта, Росморречфлот).

== Ministers of Transport of the Russian Federation ==
Vitaly Yefimov	1990 - 1996
Nikolai Tsakh	1996–1998
Sergey Frank	1998–2004
Igor Levitin	2004 - 2012
Maksim Sokolov	2012–2018
Yevgeny Dietrich	2018–2020
Vitaly Savelyev	2020–2024
Roman Starovoyt	2024-2025
Andrey Nikitin	2025-present

== See also ==
- Transport in Russia
- Rail transport in Russia
