= Mikhail Beketov =

Russian journalist (1958–2013)

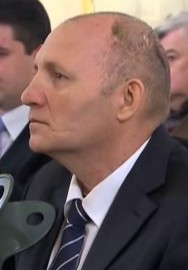
Beketov in 2012

Mikhail Vasilyevich Beketov (Russian: Михаил Васильевич Бекетов; 10 January 1958 – 8 April 2013) was a Russian journalist who came to widespread attention when he was attacked in an assault thought to be connected with his coverage of the planned destruction of the Khimki Forest to make way for the Moscow–Saint Petersburg motorway.

== Career ==
Beketov graduated from Moscow State University and worked on the Baikal-Amur motorway. He later moved to Khimki and started publishing a newspaper, Khimkinskaya Pravda (Химкинская правда, Khimki Truth). In the paper, he frequently criticised the local administration for corruption.

== Motorway opposition ==
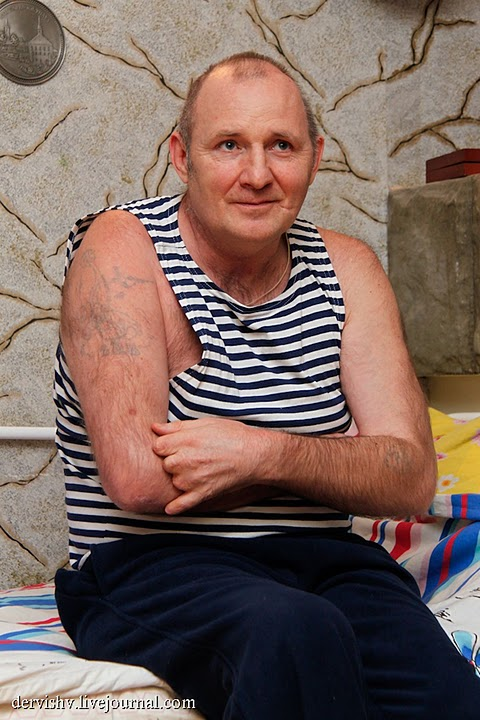
Beketov in 2010

Beketov covered the construction of the motorway and its potential damage to the environment, particularly around the area of the Khimki Forest, near Moscow. He also covered activists working to prevent the destruction of the forest, like Yevgenia Chirikova. He claims to have received warnings from local officials to desist his coverage, and his car was set on fire and his dog killed. Finally, on 13 November 2008, he was assaulted by unknown assailants. He sustained severe injuries, including brain damage, and the loss of his right leg and four fingers. The attack took place outside his home in Khimki. Beketov underwent eight operations and used a wheelchair.

== Trial ==
Beketov accused the local mayor, Vladimir Strelchenko, of criminal activity in relation to the building of the motorway. In turn, Strelchenko sued Beketov for libel in 2010. Unable to speak or walk, Beketov lost the case. Strelchenko remained mayor for four years and eventually stepped down, according to authorities, for unrelated reasons.

== Intimidation of opposition activists ==
The media have linked Beketov's attack to a wider series of assaults on other journalists and activists connected to the building of the motorway. Among them are: Anatoliy Adamchuk from Zhukovskiye Vesti and Oleg Kashin from Kommersant.

== Solidarity with Mikail Beketov ==
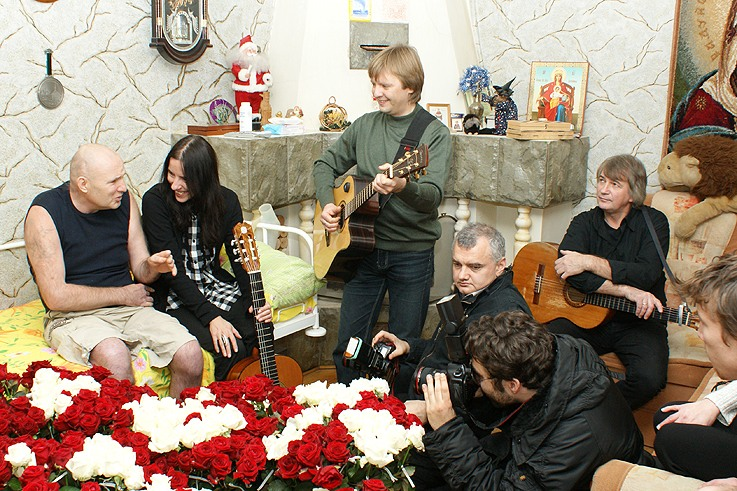
A concert at Beketov's home on 27 November 2010

In the autumn of 2010, a series of rallies was held in Moscow and elsewhere against persecution of civil activists and journalists in Russia.

On 27 November 2010, a group of concerned people visited Beketov in his home. They presented him with 501 roses and held a concert. The money for the roses had been collected from sympathisers on the Internet, so that each person could buy one rose.

== Death ==
Beketov died at the age of 55 from cardiac arrest on 8 April 2013. According to the Committee to Protect Journalists his death was directly related to injuries he sustained during the 2008 attack. Counting this as cause for his death Forbidden Stories included Beketov in a list of 13 reporters investigating environmental issues that have been killed between 2009 and 2019.

== Awards ==
Free Media Awards 2010.
