= Yevgeniya Chirikova =

Russian environmental activist (born 1976)

- Евгения Чирикова
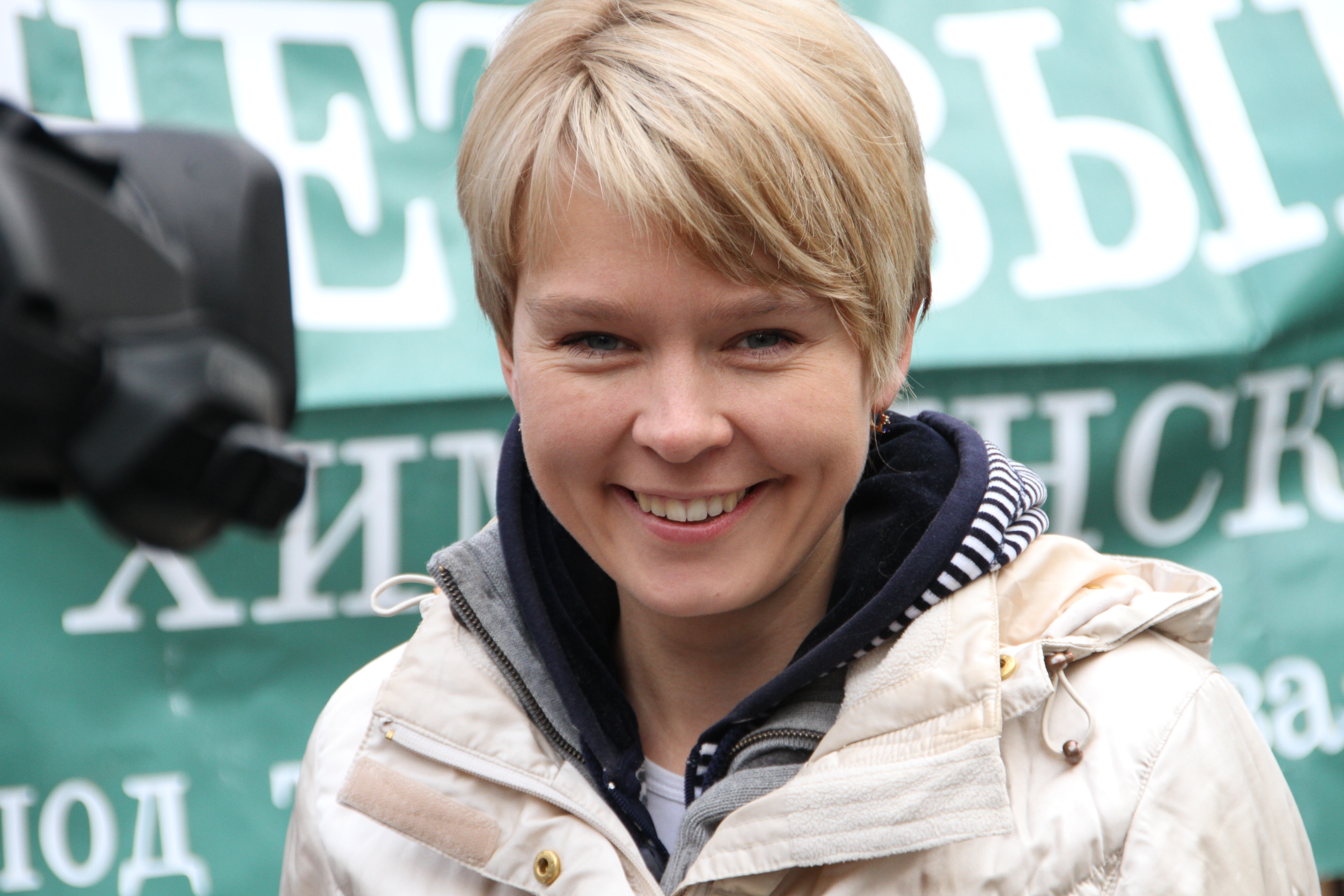
- Chirikova in 2011
- Born: 12 November 1976 (age 49); Moscow, RSFSR, Soviet Union
- Education: Moscow Aviation Institute
- Movement: Russian Opposition Coordination Council; Free Russia Forum
- Awards: Goldman Environmental Prize

Yevgeniya Sergeyevna Chirikova (Russian: Евге́ния Серге́евна Чи́рикова: born 12 November 1976) is a Russian opposition figure, environmental activist, primarily known for opposing the building of a motorway through Khimki Forest near Moscow. She has also played a prominent role in the 2011–2013 Russian protests following disputed parliamentary elections in Russia. Chirikova has also been credited with "stimulating nationwide interest in political reform". She is currently based in Estonia.

== Campaigning ==
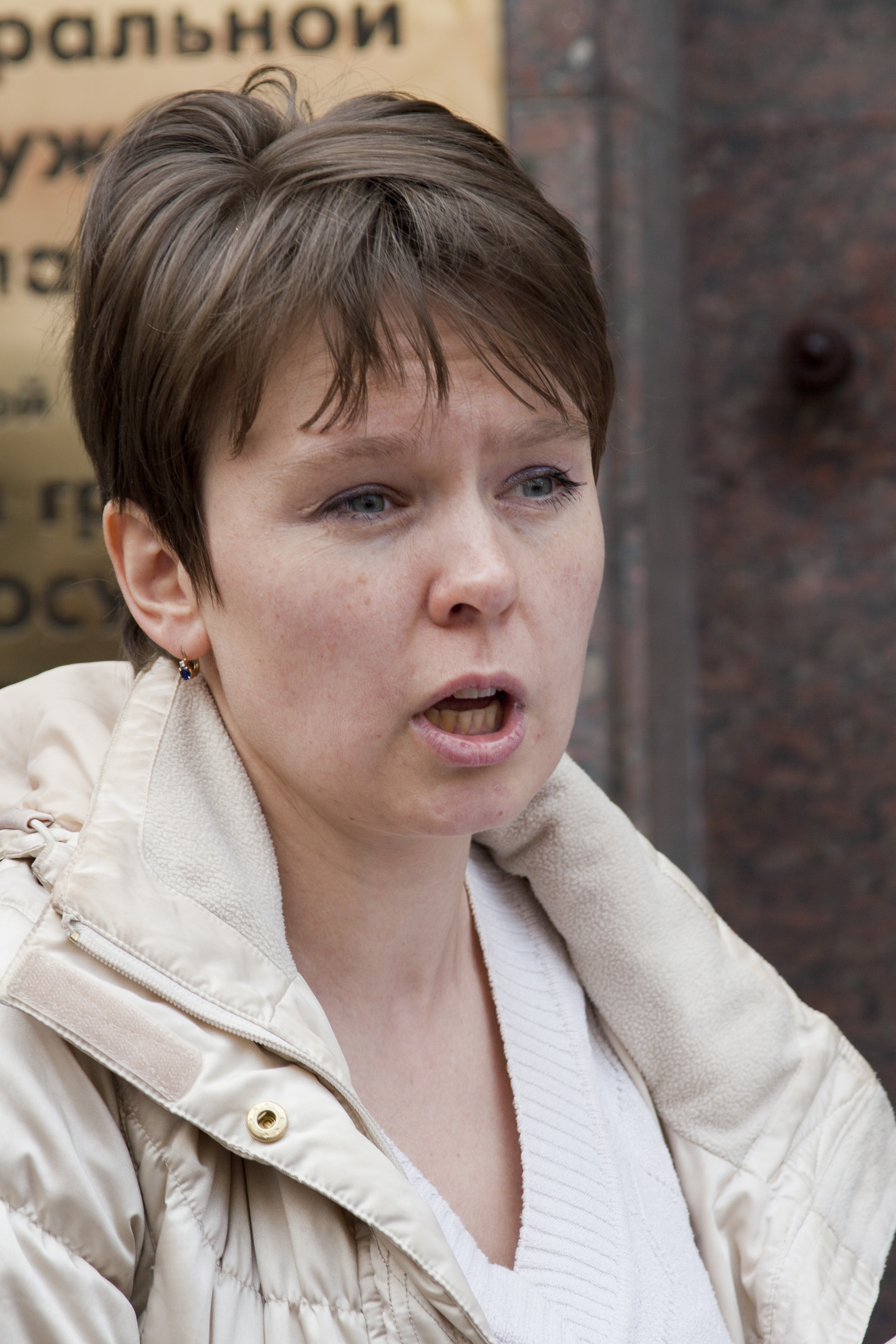
Chirikova in April 2011

Chirikova has campaigned against the building of a road through Khimki Forest. She also helped convince the European Bank for Reconstruction and Development and the European Investment Bank to "shun the project".

Chirikova has been the subject of intimidation because of her campaigning. In 2011 government officials visited her, saying they had been instructed to take away her children because she was abusing them. According to Chirikova, "My reaction was completely unmitigated rage. I recorded myself describing what had happened and posted the video on the web. There were so many calls to the department that they withdrew."

== Awards ==
In March 2011, she received the Woman of Courage Award handed over by then-US Vice President Joe Biden. On this occasion, she proposed imposing sanctions on Russian politicians including Minister of Transport Igor Levitin.

In 2012, she was a winner of the Goldman Environmental Prize, receiving a US$150,000 prize. She has said that she will spend the money setting up a campaign group called Our Land (Russian: наша земля - Nasha Zemlya) to fight similar environmental campaigns to Khimki.

In November 2012, Foreign Policy named Yevgeniya Chirikova one of its 2012 Top 100 Global Thinkers.

On 19 November 2024, Chirikova was awarded the 23rd Hanno R Ellenbogen Citizenship Award at the Palffy Palace, Bratislava, at a ceremony also honoring Cardinal Dominik Duka (25th), Milan Knazko (24th) and Barbara Day by the Prague Society for International Cooperation and Global Panel Foundation as part of the 35th Commemoration of the Velvet Revolution and 25th Hanno R Ellenbogen Citizenship Award Ceremony.

== Family ==
Yevgeniya Chirikova is married to businessman Mikhail Matveyev, candidate of Physical and Mathematical Sciences, coordinator of the Movement to Defend the Khimki Forest. She has two daughters, Liza and Sasha. Her brother is magician Dmitry Chirikov.

== See also ==
- Anti-Seliger
