= Hammersmith Bridge =

Suspension bridge in London, England

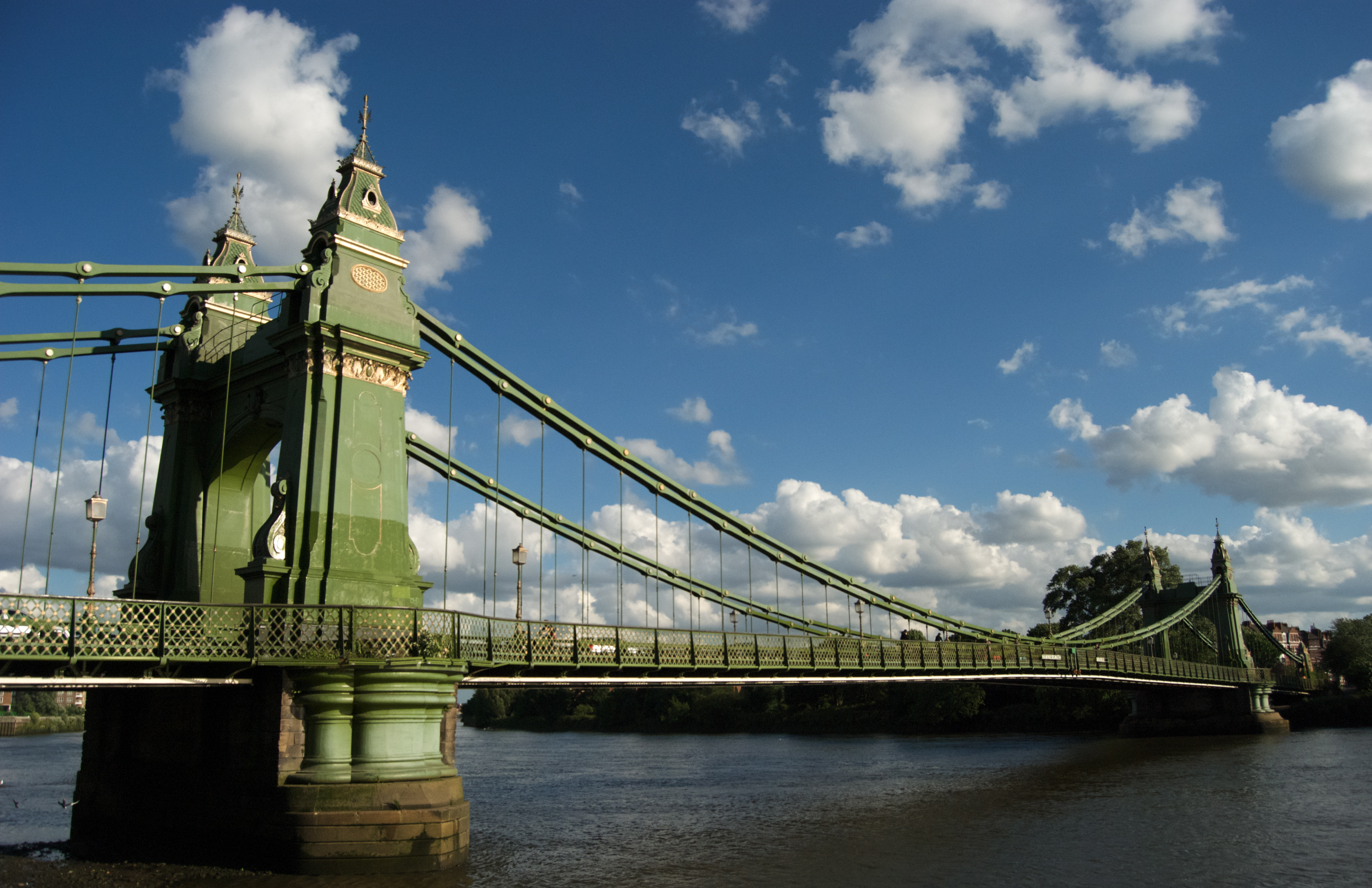
- Coordinates: 51°29′18″N 0°13′49″W
- Carries: A306 road
- Crosses: River Thames
- Locale: London, England
- Maintained by: Hammersmith and Fulham London Borough Council
- Preceded by: Barnes Railway Bridge
- Followed by: Putney Bridge

Characteristics
- Design: Suspension bridge
- Material: Steel, wrought iron, cast iron, plywood
- Pier construction: Stone
- Total length: 700 ft (210 m)
- Width: 43 ft (13 m)
- Longest span: 400 ft (120 m)
- No. of spans: 3
- Piers in water: 2
- Clearance below: 3.5 metres (11 ft) MHWS
- No. of lanes: 2 (motor vehicles)

History
- Designer: William Tierney Clark (first bridge); Joseph Bazalgette (current bridge)
- Constructed by: Dixon, Appleby & Thorne (current bridge)
- Construction start: 1825 (first bridge); 1884 (current bridge)
- Construction end: 1827 (first bridge); 1887 (current bridge)
- Construction cost: £80,000 (first bridge) £82,117 (current bridge)
- Opened: 6 October 1827; 199 years ago (first bridge); 11 June 1887; 139 years ago (current bridge)
- Inaugurated: 6 October 1827 (first bridge); 11 June 1887 (current bridge)
- Rebuilt: 1884–1887
- Closed: 10 April 2019; 7 years ago (motor vehicles)

Statistics

Listed Building – Grade II*
- Official name: Hammersmith Bridge
- Designated: 12 May 1970; 56 years ago
- Reference no.: 1079819

Location
- Interactive map of Hammersmith Bridge

Hammersmith Bridge is a suspension bridge that crosses the River Thames in west London. It links the southern part of Hammersmith in the London Borough of Hammersmith and Fulham, on the north side of the river, with Barnes in the London Borough of Richmond upon Thames, on the south side of the river. The current bridge, which is Grade II* listed and was designed by civil engineer Sir Joseph Bazalgette, is the second permanent bridge on the site, and has been attacked three times by the IRA.

The bridge was closed indefinitely to all motor traffic in April 2019 after cracks were discovered in the bridge's pedestals. The closure was extended to pedestrians and cyclists between August 2020 and July 2021 when limited use resumed. Further work and intermittent closures continued until April 2025, when the resurfaced wooden roadway was reopened to pedestrians and cyclists.

== History ==
=== Origins ===
A group of local people proposed a new bridge at Hammersmith rather than detouring to either Kew Bridge or Putney Bridge to cross the river. The construction of the bridge was first sanctioned by an act of Parliament, the Hammersmith Bridge Act 1824 (5 Geo. 4. c.cxii), on 9 June 1824, which established the Hammersmith Bridge Company. Work began on site the following year, and the bridge was opened on 6 October 1827. Construction of the bridge cost some £80,000 (equivalent to £7.6 million in 2025).

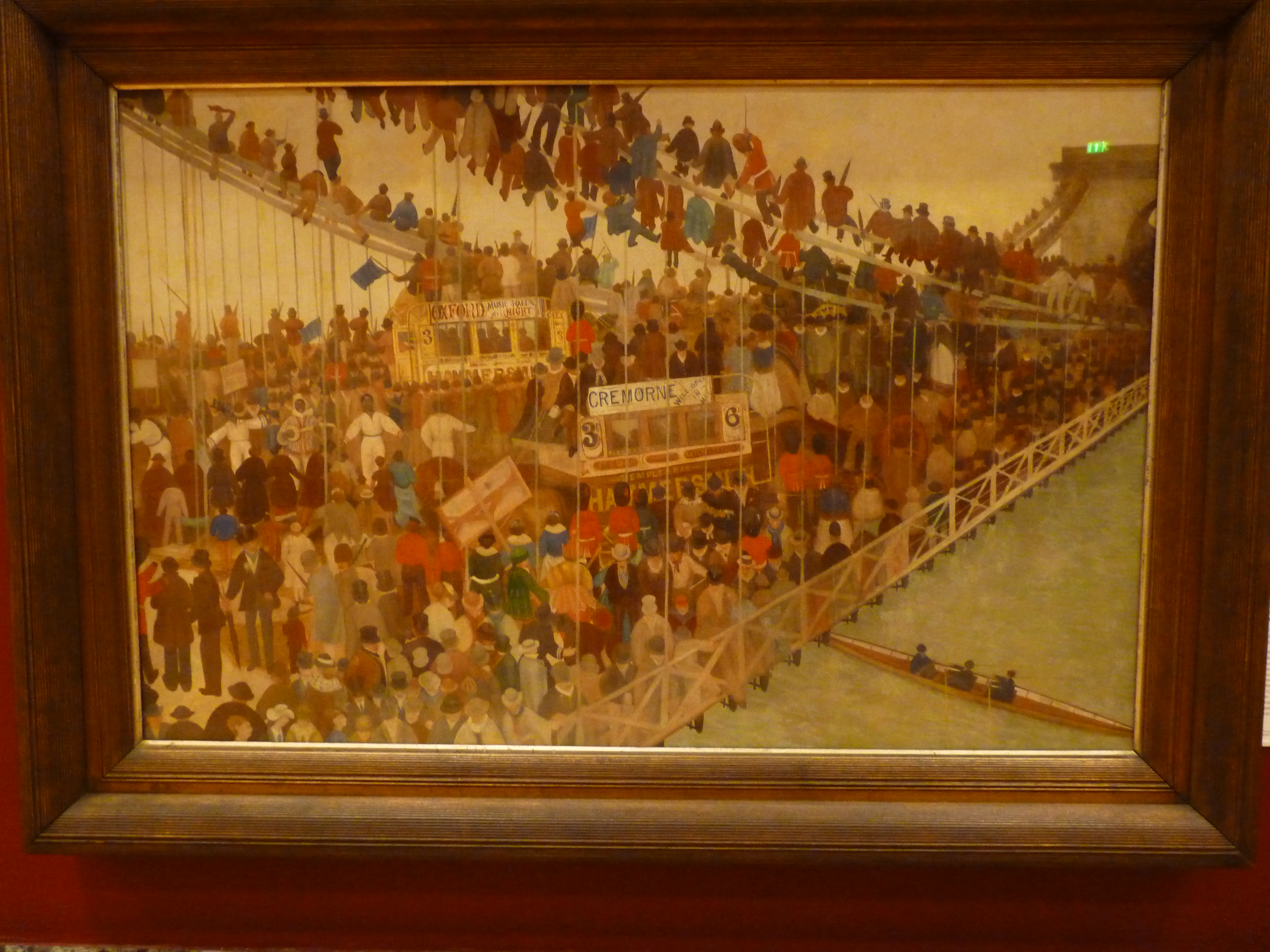
A painting by Walter Greaves showing the then Hammersmith Bridge densely overloaded by 12,000 spectators watching the University Boat Race, circa 1870.

By the 1870s, the bridge was no longer strong enough to support the weight of heavy traffic and the owners were alarmed in 1870 when 11,000 to 12,000 people crowded onto the bridge to watch the University Boat Race, which passes underneath just before the halfway point of its 4 1/4-mile (7 km) course.

It was the first suspension bridge over the River Thames and was designed by William Tierney Clark. A further act of Parliament, the Hammersmith Bridge Act 1828 (9 Geo. 4. c. lii) was obtained in 1828. The acts also included powers to acquire land by compulsory purchase in order to build approach roads, and required the company to purchase the entire Barn Elms estate (the surplus land was subsequently sold).

The bridge had a clear water-way of 688 feet 8 inches (209.91 m). Its suspension towers were 48 feet (15 m) above the level of the roadway, where they were 22 feet (6.7 m) thick. The roadway was slightly curved upwards, 16 feet (4.9 m) above high water, and the extreme length from the back of the piers on shore was 822 feet 8 inches (250.75 m), supporting 688 feet (210 m) of roadway. There were eight chains, composed of wrought-iron bars, each five inches deep and one thick. Four of these had six bars in each chain; and four had only three, making thirty-six bars, which form a dip in the centre of about 29 feet (8.8 m). From these, vertical rods were suspended, which supported the roadway, formed of strong timbers covered with granite. The width of the carriageway was 20 feet (6.1 m), with two footways of 5 feet (1.5 m). The chains passed over the suspension towers, and were secured to the piers on each shore. The suspension towers were built of stone, and designed as archways of the Tuscan order. The approaches were provided with octagonal lodges, or toll-houses, with appropriate lamps and parapet walls, terminating with stone pillars, surmounted with ornamental caps. To increase profits, the company built a floating steamboat pier to the downstream side of the suspension pier closest to Barnes. The Metropolitan Board of Works purchased the bridge from the Hammersmith Bridge Company in 1880 under the Metropolis Toll Bridges Act 1877 (40 & 41 Vict. c. xcix), and transferred the approach roads to the local authorities (Fulham District Board of Works and the Parish of Barnes). The tolls were removed from the bridge on 26 June 1880.

There were no immediate plans to replace the bridge, which remained sound, until a boat collided with it in 1882 causing damage, and leading to the Metropolitan Board of Works (Bridges, &c.) Act 1883 that authorised the construction of a replacement. In 1884 a temporary bridge was put up to allow a more limited cross-river traffic while a replacement was constructed.

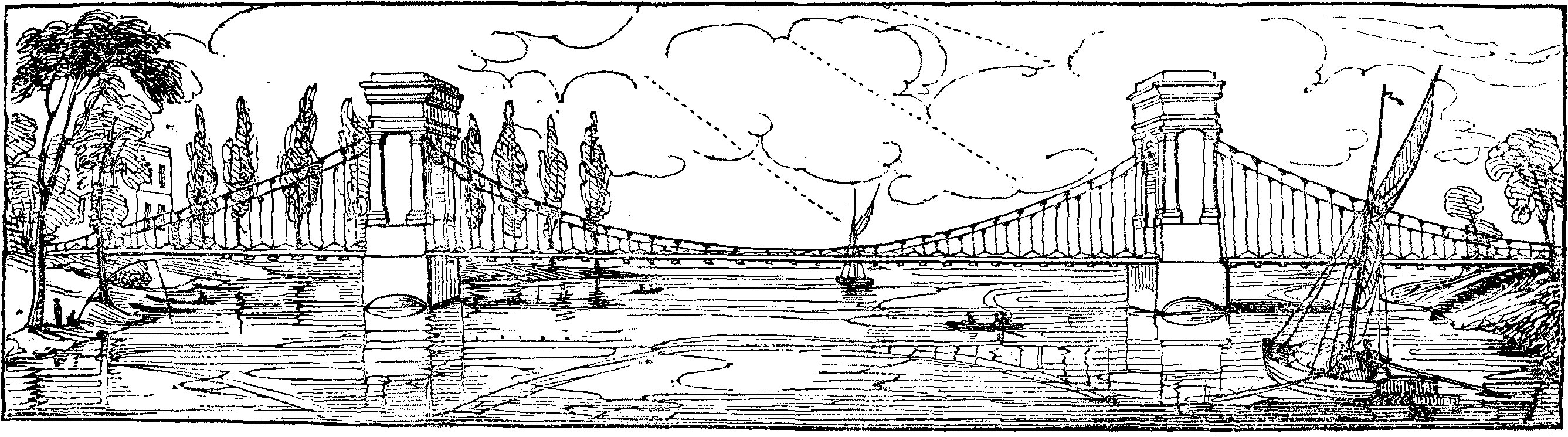
Engraving of the first Hammersmith Bridge, completed 1827

=== 1880s construction ===
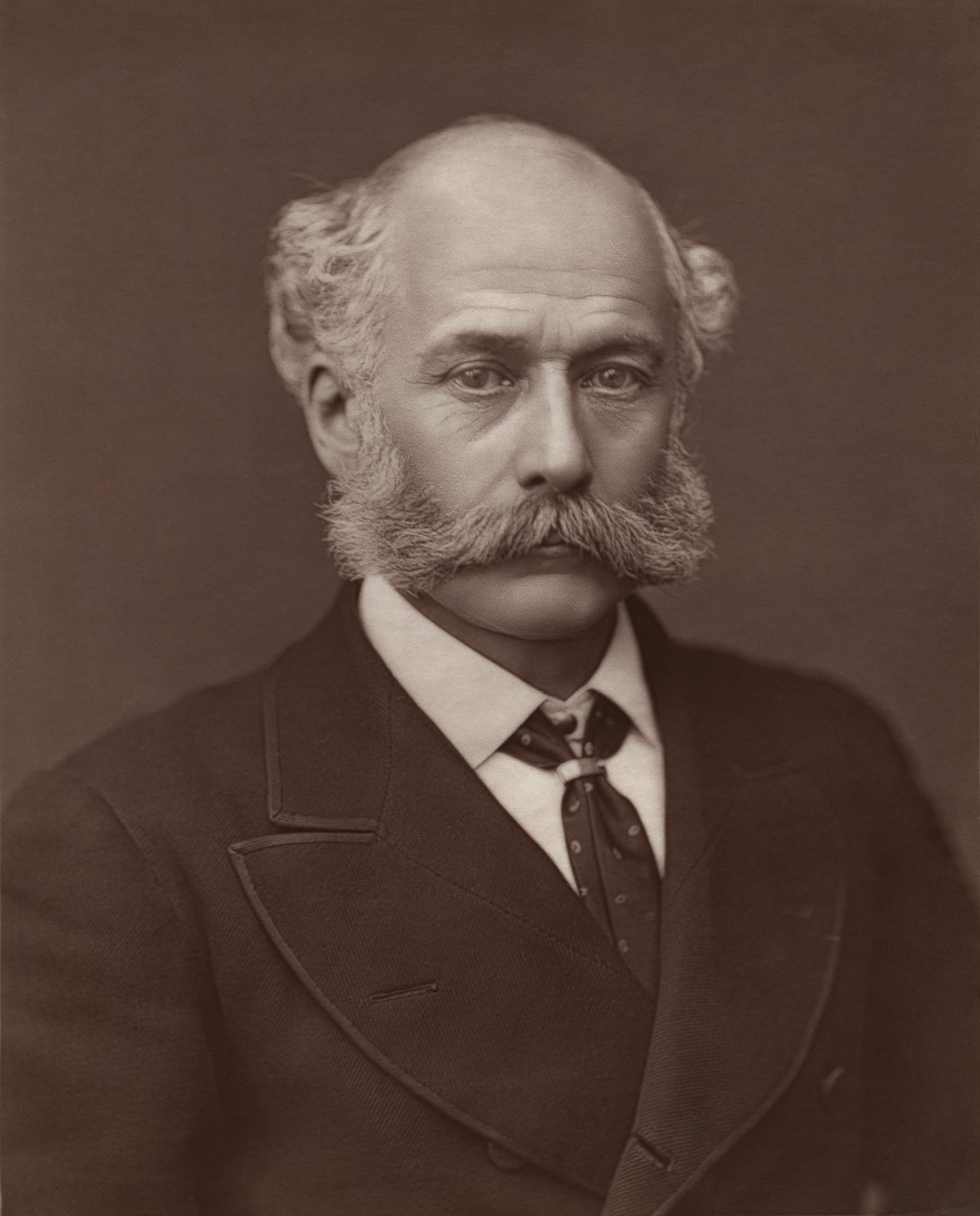
Joseph Bazalgette designed the current bridge.

The current Hammersmith Bridge was designed by Sir Joseph Bazalgette and rests on the same pier foundations constructed for Tierney Clark's original structure. As built, the carriageway was 27 feet 2 inches wide, narrowing to 19 feet 9 inches between the towers, with two footways of 5 feet 10 inches. The maximum headway above high water was 15 feet 1 inch.

The new bridge was built by Dixon, Appleby & Thorne and was opened on 11 June 1887 by the Duke of Clarence. With much of the supporting structure built of wrought iron, it is 700 feet (210 m) long and 43 feet (13 m) wide and cost £82,117 to build (equivalent to £9.3 million in 2025). With the abolition of the Metropolitan Board of Works on 21 March 1889, ownership of Hammersmith Bridge passed to the new London County Council.

=== 20th century ===
Near midnight on 27 December 1919, Lieutenant Charles Campbell Wood, a South African serving as an airman in the Royal Air Force, dived from the upstream footway of the bridge into the Thames to rescue a drowning woman. Although Wood saved her life, he later died from tetanus as a consequence of his injuries. His act of bravery is commemorated by a plaque on the handrail, which reads:

Lieutenant Charles Campbell Wood RAF
of Bloemfontein, South Africa dived from this spot into
the Thames at midnight 27 Dec. 1919 and saved a woman's life.
He died from the injuries received following the rescue.

The Royal Commission on Cross-River Traffic in London, 1926 recorded that the limited headroom for navigation was considered unsatisfactory and that there was little room for any increase in traffic. It continued

Moreover the bridge is so constantly under repair that it is frequently available for only one line of vehicles and is the source of so much delay and congestion of traffic. We regard it as essential that Hammersmith Bridge should be rebuilt as soon as possible and widened to take four lines of traffic, without restriction of weight.

The first attempt by Irish republicans to destroy Hammersmith Bridge occurred on Wednesday 29 March 1939, when it was attacked by the IRA (of 1922–1969) as part of their S-Plan. Maurice Childs, a women's hairdresser from nearby Chiswick, was crossing the bridge at one o'clock in the morning when he saw a smouldering suitcase that was lying on the walkway. He realised it was a bomb and threw it over the side into the Thames, where it exploded. Soon afterwards, another bomb exploded, damaging the bridge and breaking windows in nearby houses. Childs was given an MBE for his quick-thinking. Eddie Connell was jailed for 20 years, and William Browne was jailed for 10 years for the attack.

On 1 April 1965, the bridge was transferred to the Greater London Council (GLC) when it took over from London County Council.

In 1986 the GLC was abolished. The Local Government Act 1985 transferred non-trunk road bridges in their entirety to one of the two London boroughs that each bridge lay within – the choice of borough to be decided between the two councils, or failing agreement, by the Secretary of State for Transport. In addition to the bridge, the London borough taking responsibility also gained 100 yards of approach road from the other borough. For Hammersmith Bridge, on 31 March 1986 the London Borough of Hammersmith and Fulham took responsibility.

On 26 April 1996, the Provisional IRA attempted to destroy the bridge after installing two large Semtex bombs on the south bank of the Thames. Though the detonators were activated, the bomb, the largest Semtex bomb ever found in Britain at the time, failed to ignite.

At 4:30 am on 1 June 2000, the bridge was damaged by a Real IRA bomb planted underneath the Barnes span. Following two years of closure for repairs the bridge was reopened with further weight restrictions in place.

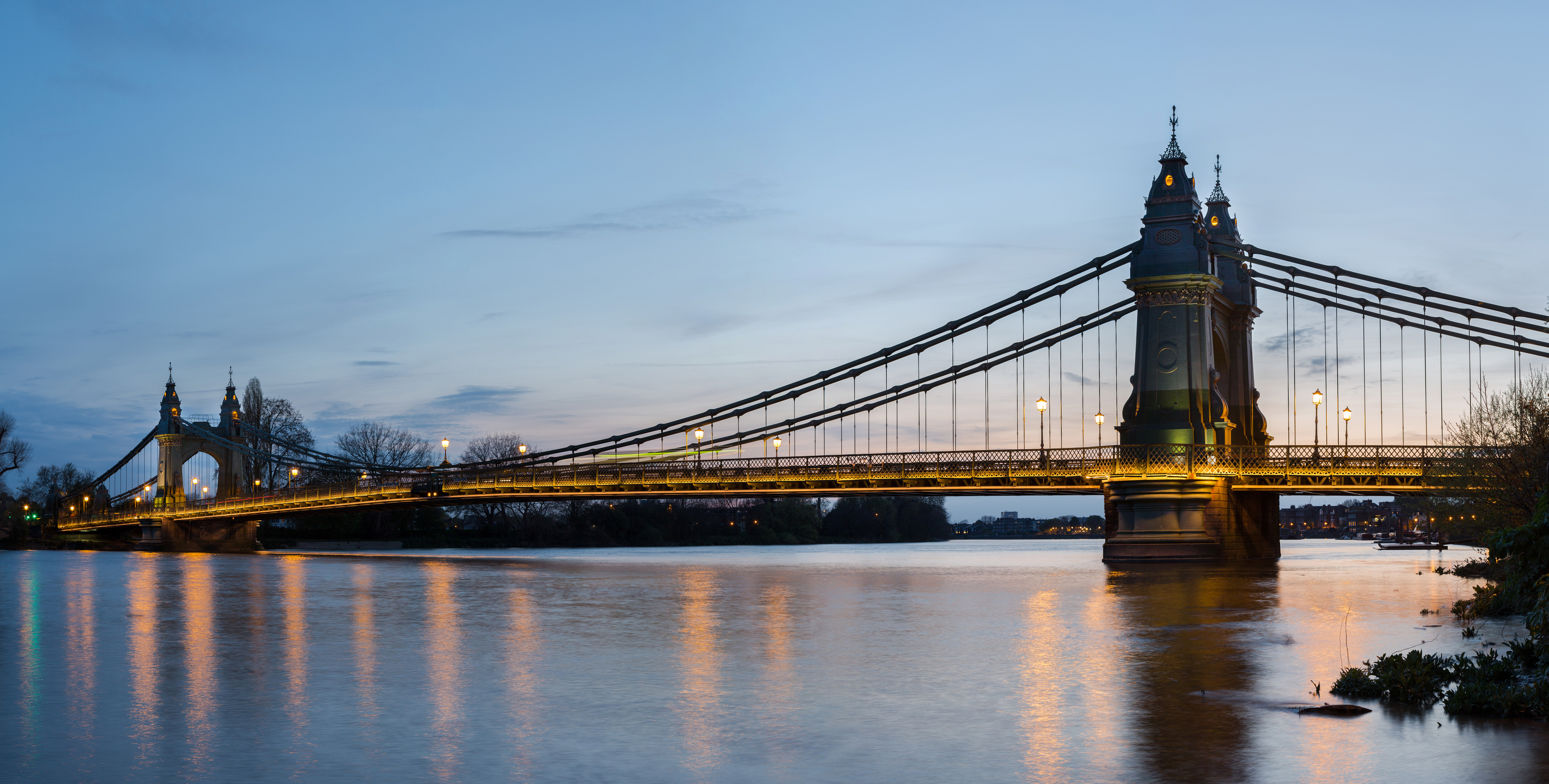
Hammersmith Bridge and riverside, seen from the Hammersmith bank

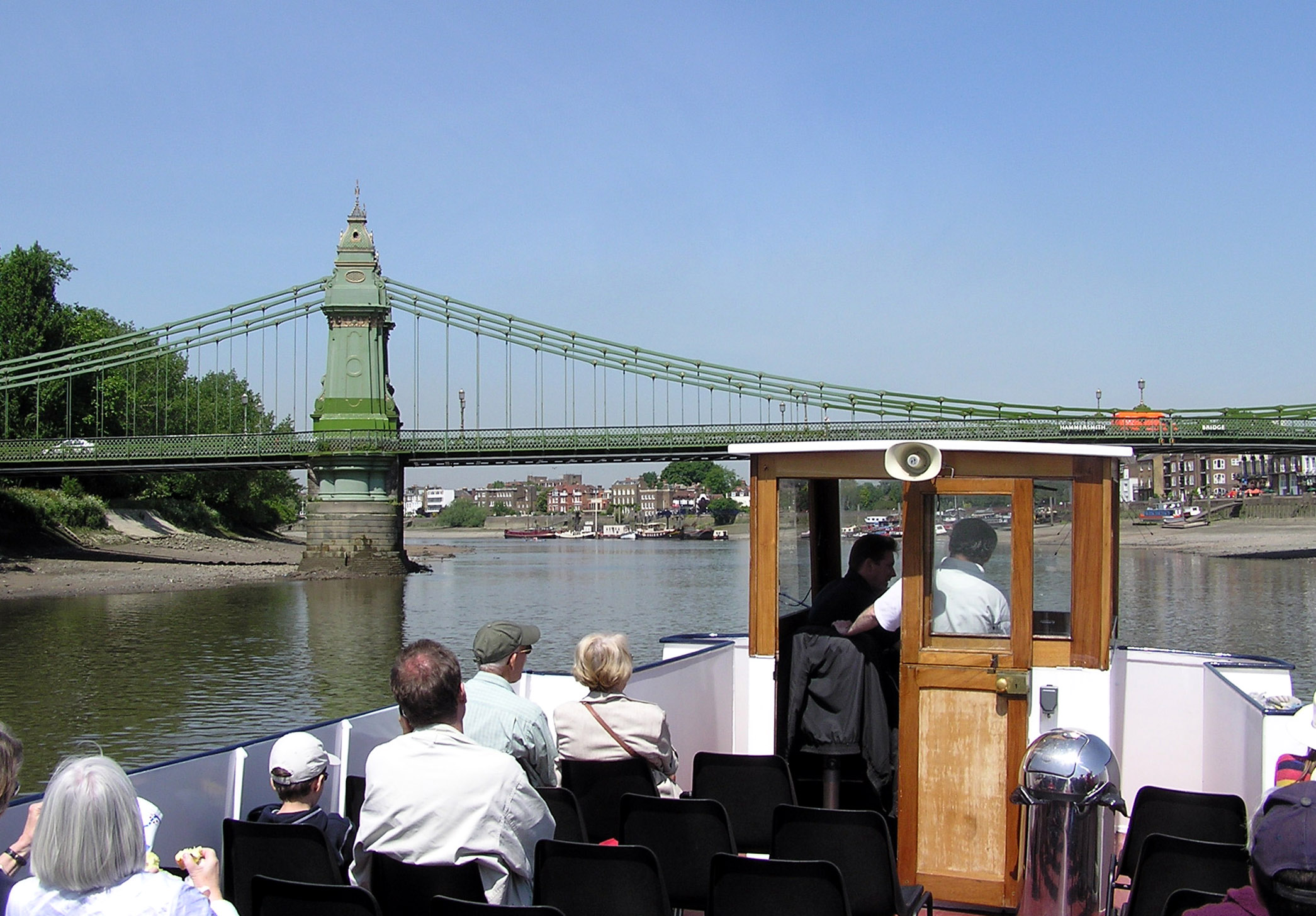
Hammersmith Bridge, seen from the Westminster to Kew tourist boat

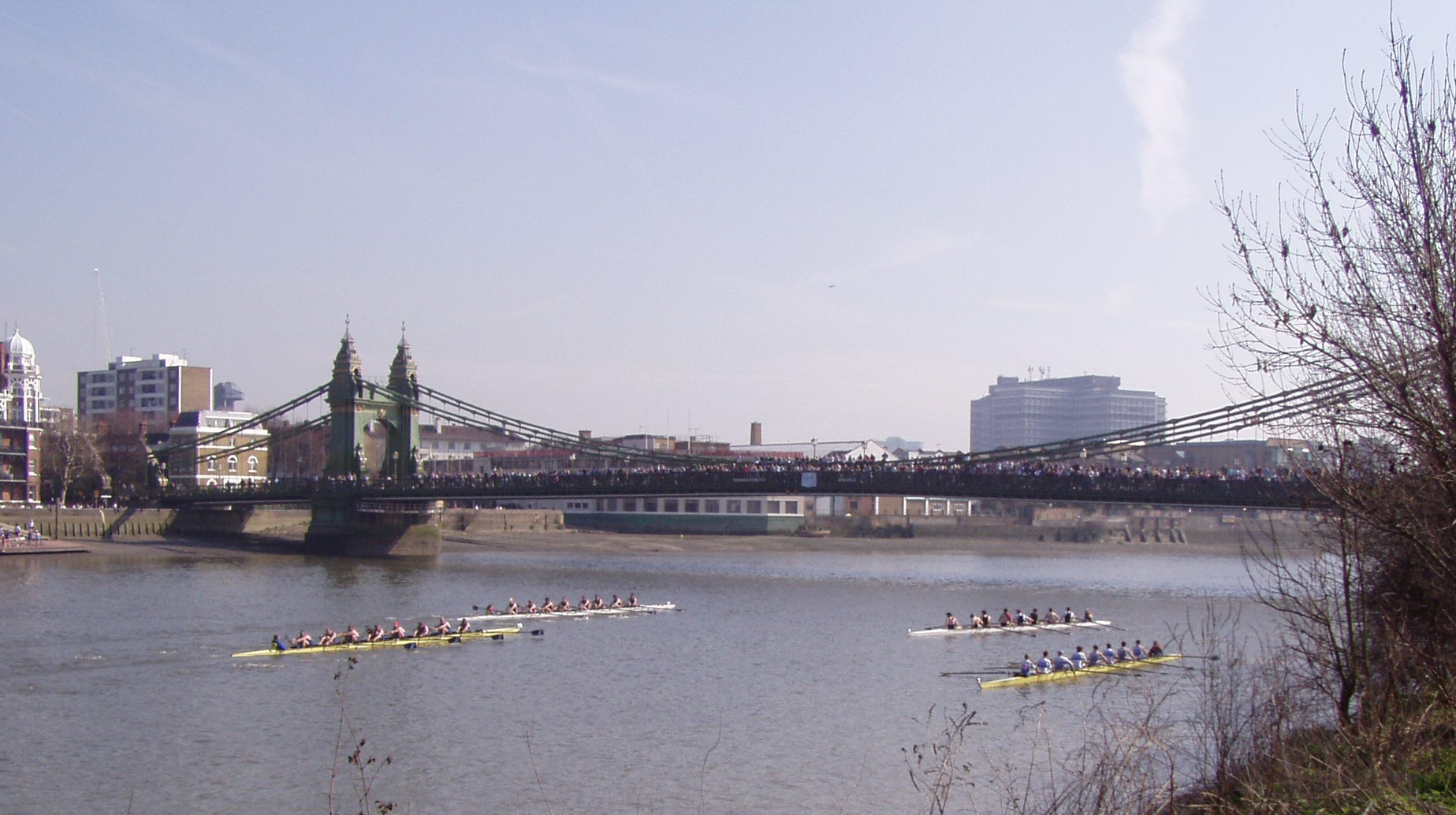
Rowing crews racing under Hammersmith Bridge

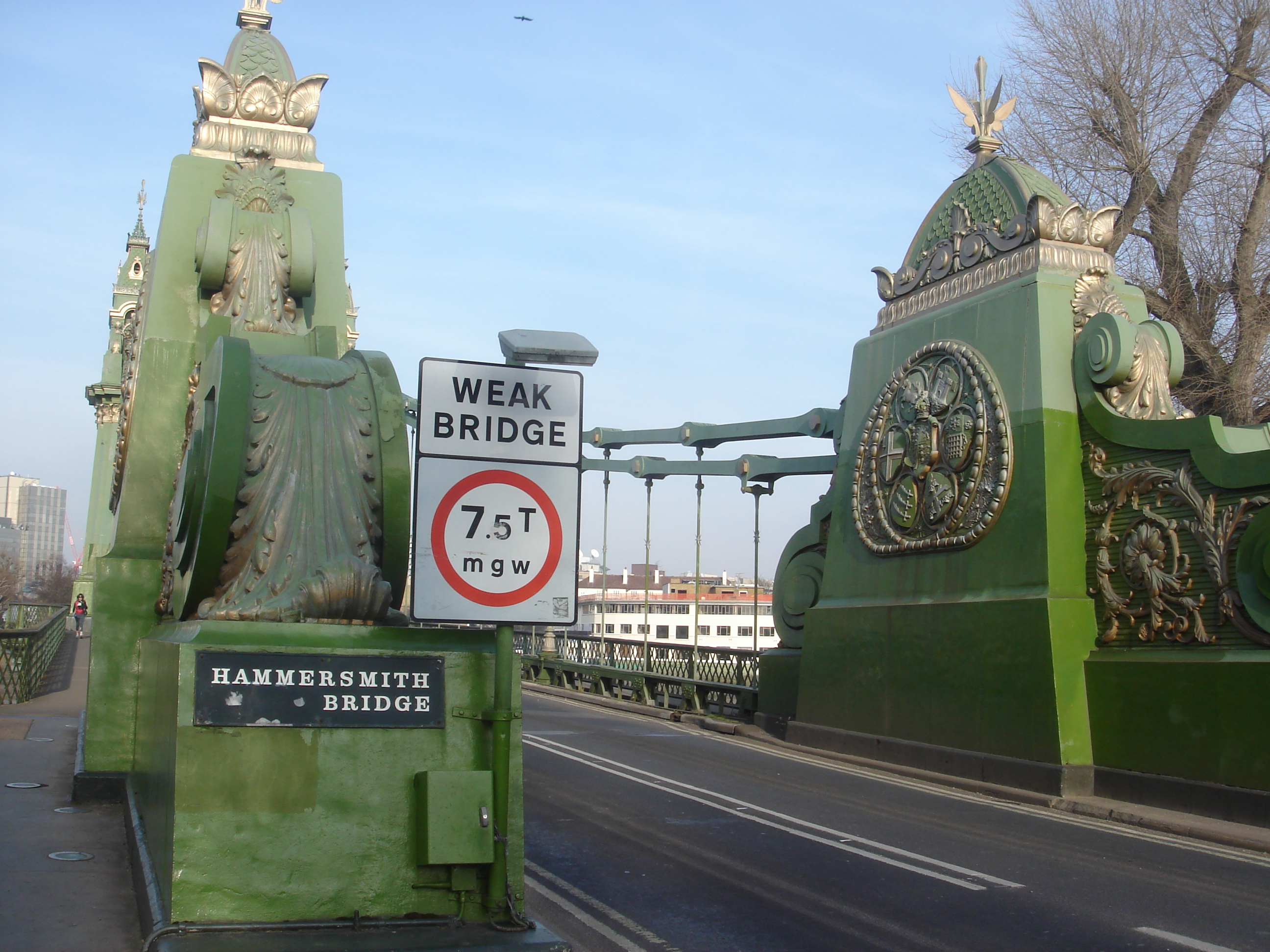
End details

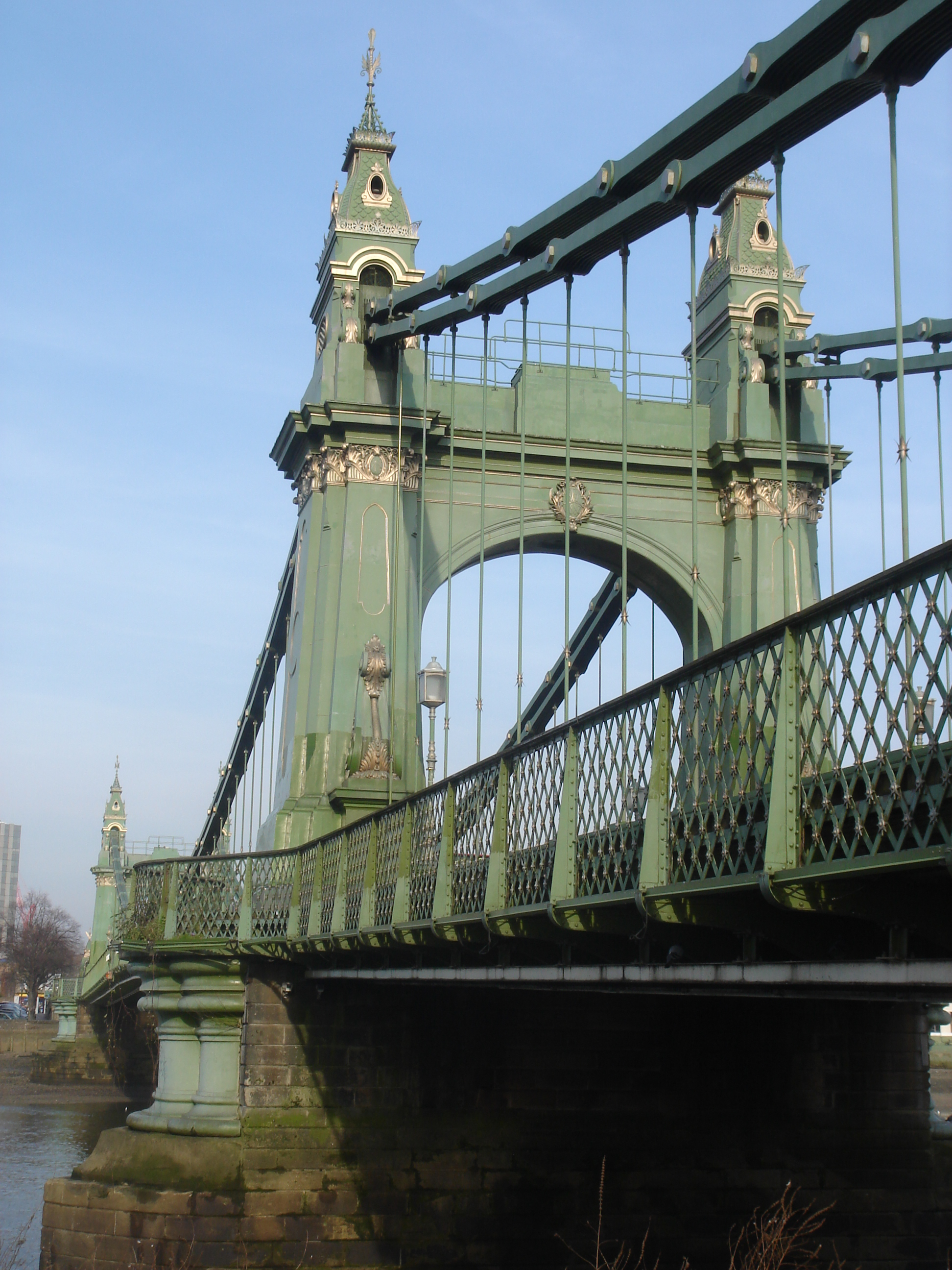
Tower

== Renewed structural problems ==
In February 1997, the bridge was closed to all traffic except buses, bicycles, motorcycles, emergency vehicles and pedestrians to allow further essential repair works. Structural elements of the bridge were corroded or worn, in particular cross girders and deck surfacing, as well as some areas of masonry. The bridge was declared a Grade II* listed structure in 2008, providing protection to preserve its special character from unsympathetic development. The bridge was again temporarily closed to traffic to allow repairs in early 2014. Further repairs and strengthening works were delayed in November 2016 in a wrangle over funding between Hammersmith and Fulham Council and Transport for London (TfL). LBHF leader Steven Cowan said: "There's no way that this council is going to spend anything like that money, the majority of this issue is the responsibility of TfL and we will work with them to make sure the bridge is fit for public purpose".

=== 2019: Closure ===
With funding for a major refurbishment still not resolved, on 10 April 2019, Hammersmith and Fulham Council closed the bridge indefinitely to motor traffic on safety grounds. Pedestrians and cyclists were allowed to use the bridge. The closure was due to cracks in the iron pedestals which support the structure. On 10 October 2019, Planning in London magazine published the results of its competition for a quick fix to Hammersmith Bridge's closure. The winning entry, by marine civil engineers Beckett Rankine, consisted of a prefabricated temporary road and foot bridge downstream of Hammersmith bridge and connecting in to Queen Caroline Street on the Hammersmith side. Beckett Rankine claimed that the bridge's cost could be recouped by charging a toll on vehicles. On 13 August 2020, the structural issues worsened in a heatwave, and the bridge was closed to cyclists and pedestrians, completely shutting use of the bridge. River traffic and pedestrian routes under the bridge were also stopped. The costs were reported as £141 million to fully repair the bridge and £46 million to stabilise it for use by cyclists and pedestrians. Neither the council nor the transportation authority had this money available.

On 9 September 2020, the Secretary of State for Transport, Grant Shapps appointed a Department for Transport task force to investigate the bridge's condition, and work towards reopening the bridge for cyclists and pedestrians, and later the return of motor traffic. In October 2020, it was announced that the bridge would not re-open to vehicles until at least 2027. In November 2020, engineers proposed a temporary double-decked steel structure within the existing bridge to allow damaged elements to be removed for repair. The scheme, designed by Foster and Partners with bridge engineers COWI, was backed by the local council and presented to Shapps. The scheme, costed at around £100 million, would allow the bridge to reopen for pedestrians and cyclists in the summer of 2021, with cars and vans able to cross two months later, and full restoration by 2023. The proposals were discussed on 19 March 2021 at a government taskforce meeting, and plans for the work to be funded through a £3 toll scheme were accepted. In December 2020, reports suggested that the full closure was overly cautious, and that little work would be needed to reopen the bridge to pedestrians and cyclists.

=== Partial reopenings ===
On 1 June 2021, TfL, Hammersmith and Fulham Council and central government came to a cost-sharing agreement that would reopen the bridge in the near future. The following month, council leader Stephen Cowan announced that the bridge would partially re-open to pedestrians and cyclists from 17 July 2021. For the first phase, a £6 million, 46-week stabilisation plan designed by consultants Mott MacDonald was approved by the council in August 2021. A second phase, involving extensive strengthening and full restoration, was to allow the bridge to reopen to motor vehicles.

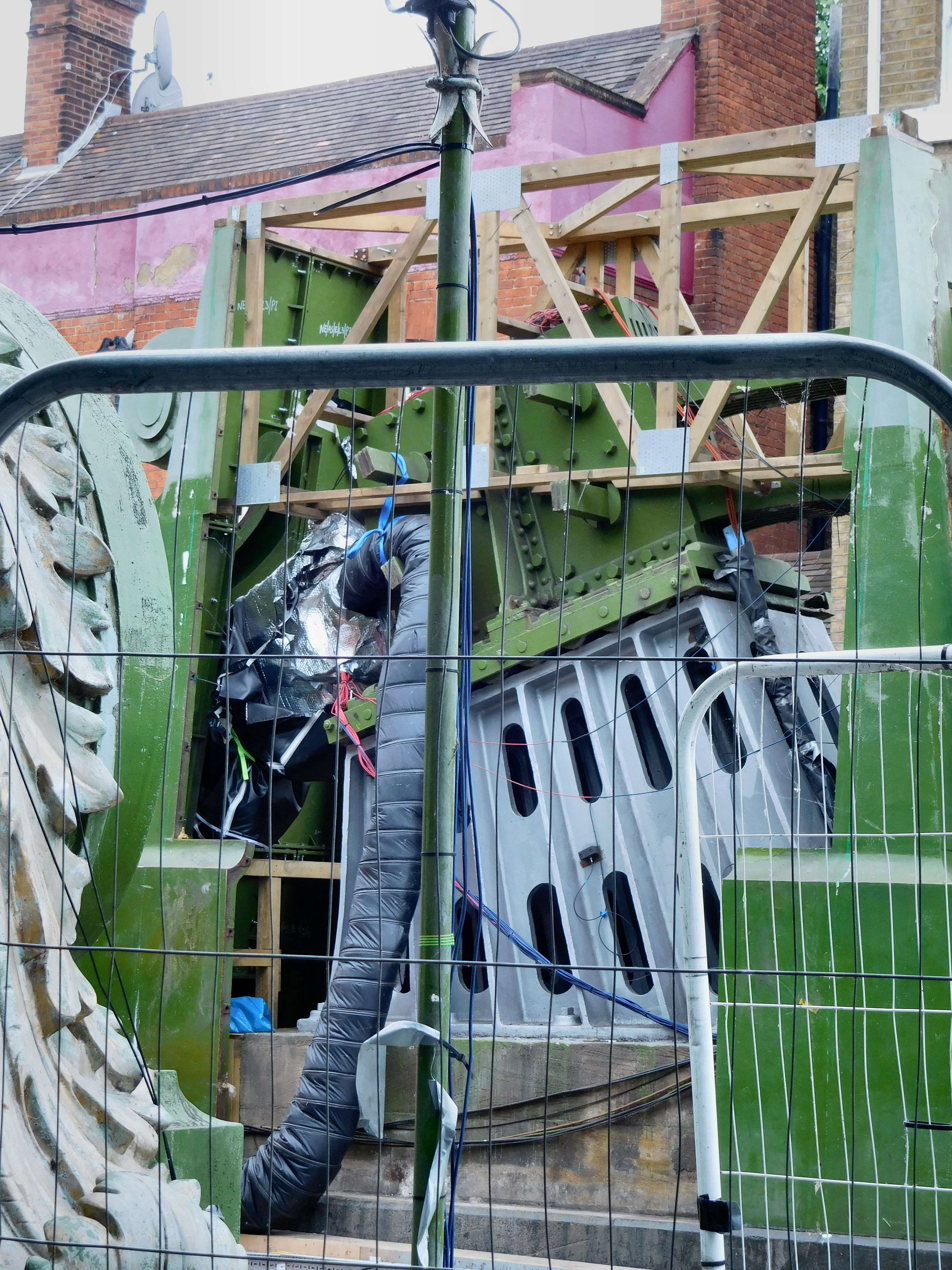
Repair works to the bridge footings

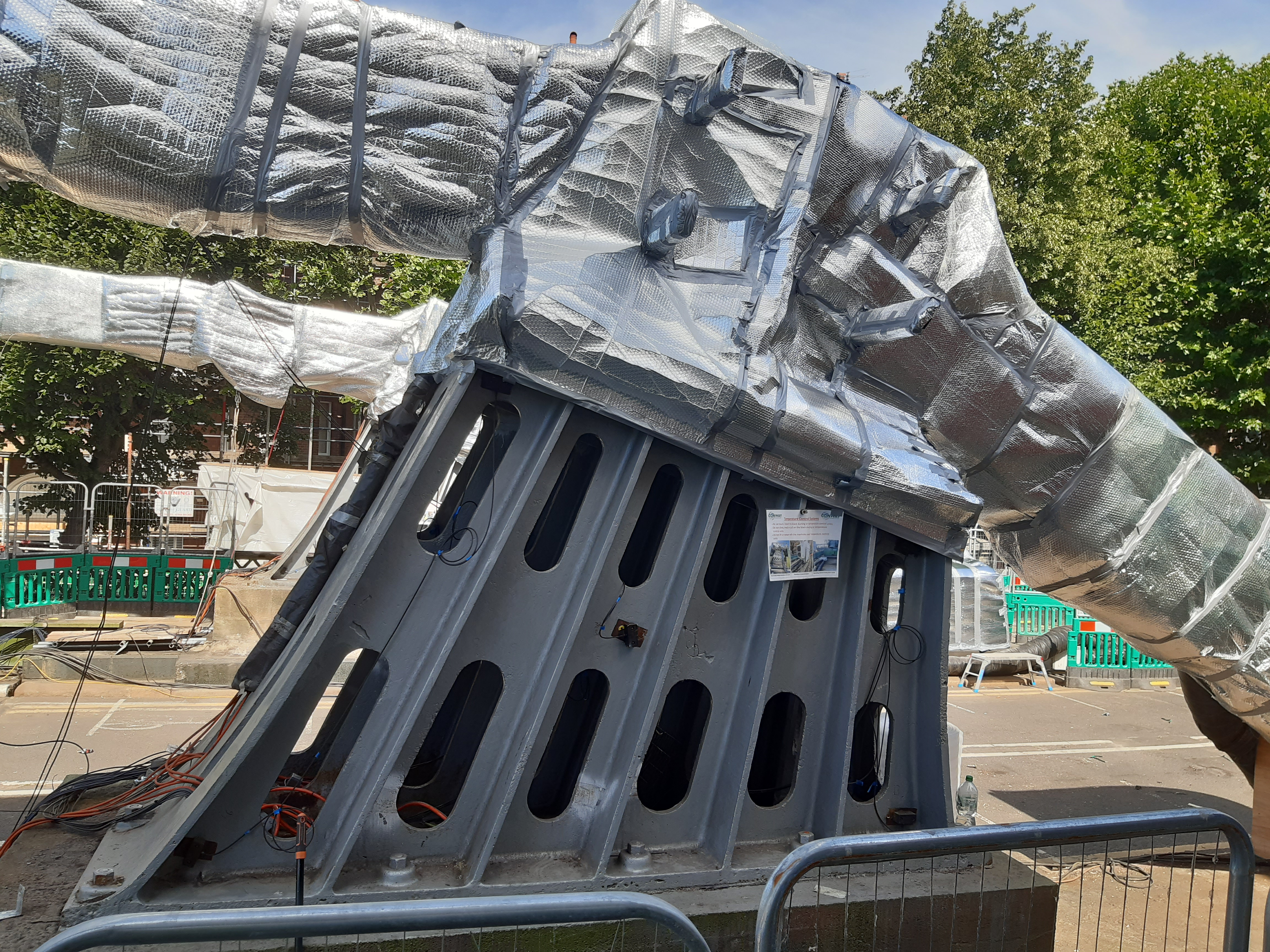
Footing foil-wrapped and cooled in heatwave, with sensors

In February 2022, highways contractor FM Conway started work on a 10-month first phase of the restoration. The council approved the full £8.9 million cost, hoping that DfT and TfL would reimburse them for their one-third shares. Completion of this work was delayed a year as steel became hard to procure due to the Russian invasion of Ukraine. In July 2022, the chains were wrapped in foil and cooled with air-conditioning to 13°C during a heatwave to prevent further cracking. In October 2022, Hammersmith and Fulham Council agreed to lodge a planning application to temporarily double-deck the bridge to speed up its restoration. The council intended to appoint a private sector contractor to design, renovate, finance and maintain the bridge, with the council's construction and ongoing operation and maintenance costs funded by tolls.

In February 2024, Hammersmith & Fulham Council reopened the central vehicle lane to cyclists for 10 weeks from 13 February 2024, while construction was paused to allow the repair of a 130 m (430 ft) steel gantry damaged in a collision with a boat, MV Emerald of London, in December 2023. The last stage was to replace the mechanical bearings on the four corner pedestals of the bridge, after which the council would "review e-mobility options to shuttle residents across the bridge, notably the elderly or disabled". In January 2024, the cost of repairing the bridge had increased to £250 million (US$316 million). A day later, London Mayor Sadiq Khan said that "I do want that bridge fit for purpose for vehicles" but neither Hammersmith & Fulham Council nor TfL had the money to make it so. TfL's 2024 Business Plan did not include funding for the bridge.

After work on the hangers that link the bridge deck to its suspension chains, the roadway was resurfaced. Its deck is of plywood boards, bolted to timber supports; worn boards and some of the timbers were replaced, at a cost of £2.9 million. The bridge reopened to pedestrians and cyclists in April 2025, with the roadway divided into wide pedestrian and cycle lanes. Pedestrians can also use the two outer footways.

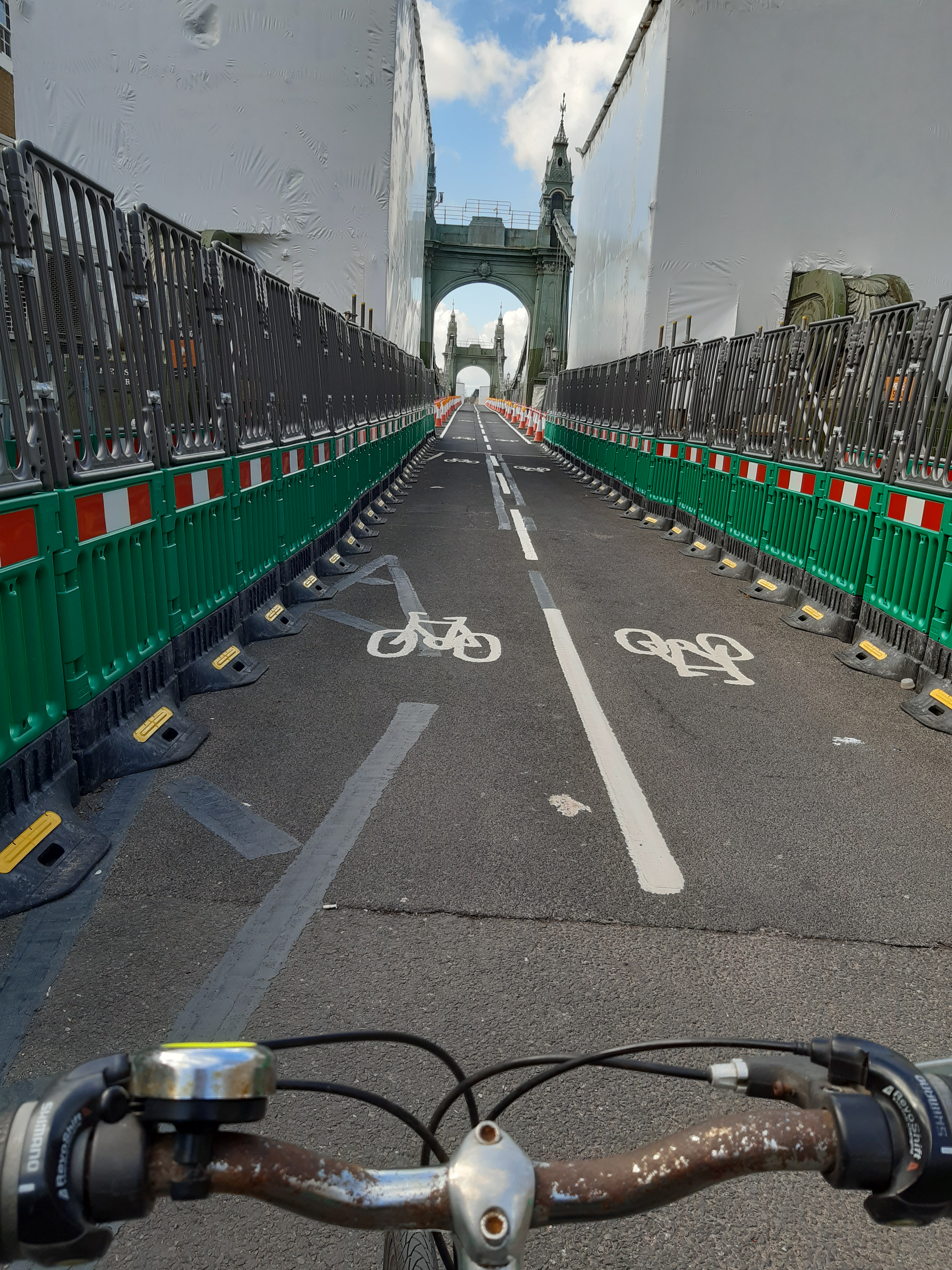
February 2024: worn roadway reopened as cycleway

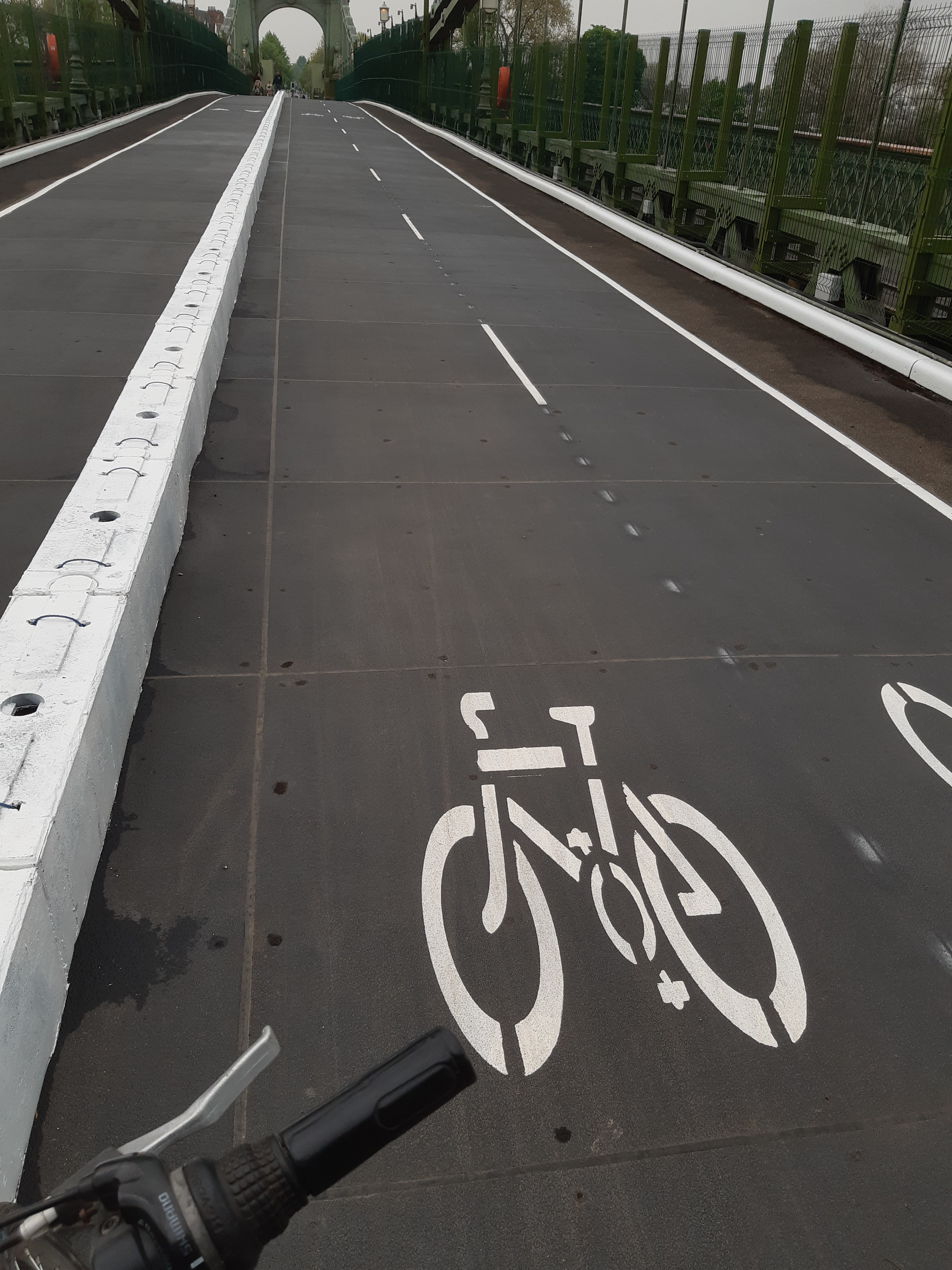
April 2025: resurfaced roadway opened to pedestrians and cyclists

On 1 July 2026, Hammersmith and Fulham council shelved its plans to reopen the bridge for motor traffic, because of the extensive repairs needed.

== Heraldry ==
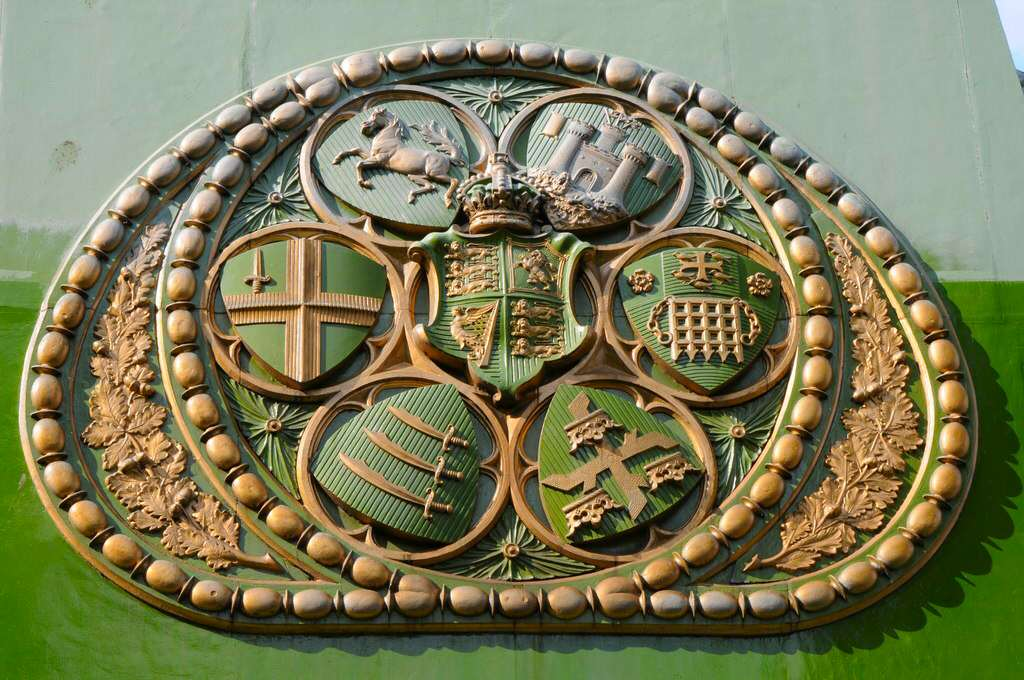
Heraldic shields on the bridge

At both the Hammersmith and Barnes ends of the bridge, there is a heraldic composition made up of seven coats of arms. These were formerly painted in their "correct" heraldic colours but have now been painted in the standard colour scheme. In the centre is the royal coat of arms of Queen Victoria which is surrounded by six others, representing the area of the Metropolitan Board of Works, from top clockwise the coats of arms of the Borough of Guildford (representing the county of Surrey), the City of Westminster, the Borough of Colchester (representing the County of Essex), the County of Middlesex, the City of London, and the County of Kent.

== See also ==
- Crossings of the River Thames
- Sir John Scott Lillie – shareholder in the 1820s Hammersmith Bridge project
- List of bridges in London
