= FM Conway =

UK construction firm

- Head office of FM Conway in Sevenoaks, England
- Type: Private
- Industry: Civil engineering
- Founded: 1961
- Founder: Francis Michael Conway
- Headquarters: Sevenoaks, England
- Key people: Andrew Hansen (MD)
- Products: Asphalt; Bitumen; Concrete; Street lighting
- Services: Highway maintenance Road surfacing
- Revenue: £608 million (March 2025)
- Net income: £46 million (March 2025)
- Number of employees: 2,000 (2024)
- Parent: Vinci
- Website: www.fmconway.co.uk

FM Conway is a UK-based civil engineering contractor specialising in highways and other infrastructure work. The company became part of the Vinci group in early 2025.

== History ==
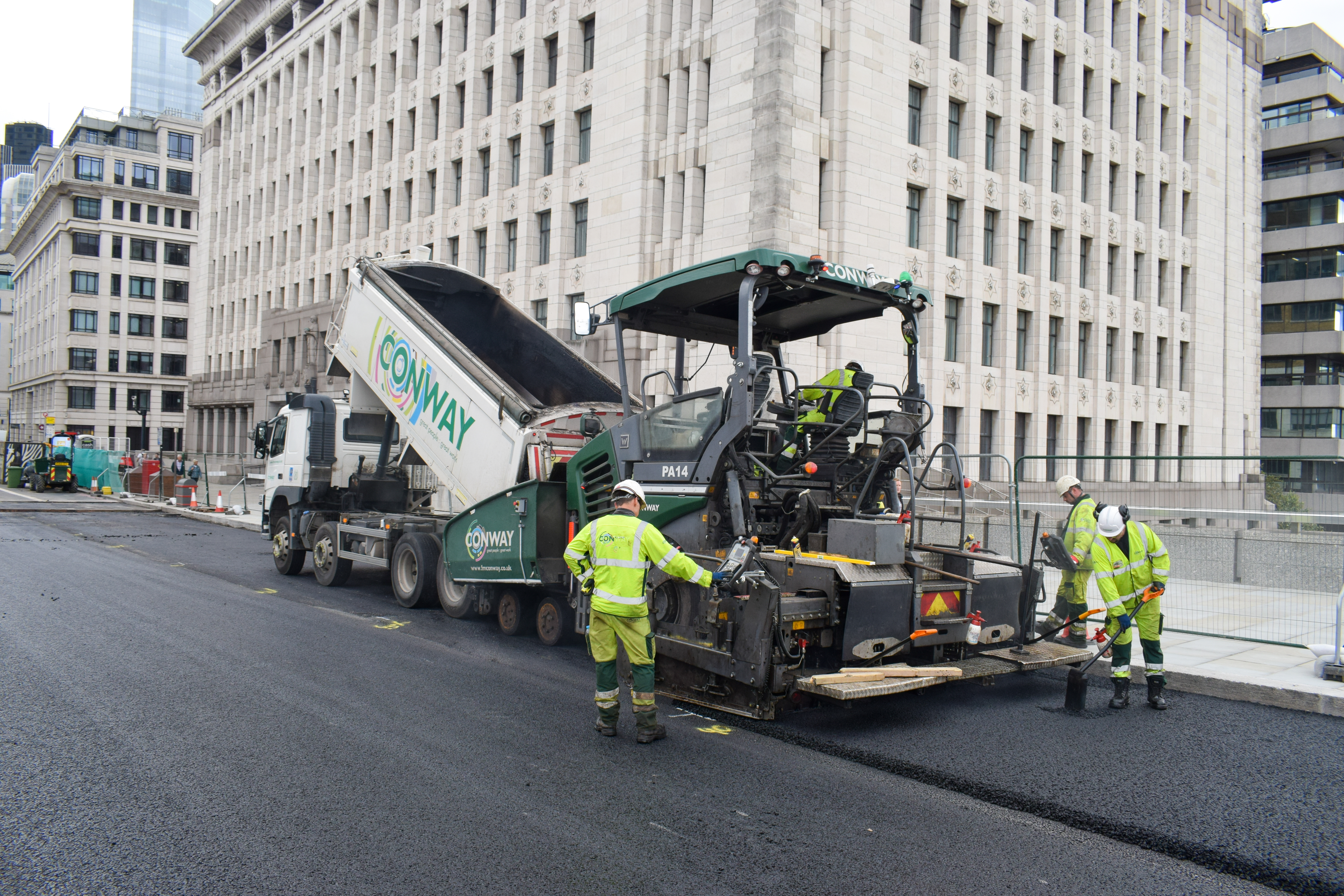
FM Conway's surfacing division working on London Bridge

The company was founded in 1961 by Francis Michael Conway. During 1981, Francis' son Michael Conway became the CEO of FM Conway; Michael would retain this role for more than 40 years.

In May 1994, it was claimed by trade union officials that FM Conway had illegally reduced its workers' wages to cover theft and damage to plant. During 2000, the company relocated to new headquarters in Dartford, Kent.

During early 2012, FM Conway formed a joint venture with the American infrastructure company Aecom following the two firm's successful shortlisting on a Transport for London highway-centric framework valued at £1.8 billion. Four years later, the firm relocated to a larger headquarters in Sevenoaks; the prior Dartford headquarters was retained and expanded in its role as a logistics hub.

During 2016, FM Conway acquired the materials supplier United Asphalt. By this point, the firm operated a network of asphalt and aggregate recycling manufacturing plants that served London and Southern England, as well as two Thames-side wharves (at Erith and Gravesend). A large portion of the company's business was coming from various local authorities and government agencies; by the mid-2010s, it was reportedly maintaining various roads across half of London's boroughs.

During 2019, the firm reported that, despite rising revenues, its pre-tax profit had fallen from £11.7 million to £3.6 million in its last financial year; this was attributed to a rising cost of sales. In February 2020, FM Conway was suspended from the Prompt Payment Code for failure to pay suppliers on time. Eight months later, following the enactment of process improvements, the firm was reinstated. During late 2021, the company reported that its pre-tax profit over the previous financial year had risen from £12.7 million to £19.4 million, a more than 50 percent rise; the majority of this was due to a £4.7 million settlement regarding a land lease right.

During March 2022, Michael Conway, the firm's chairman, died; two months later, his daughter, Joanne Conway, was appointed as chairperson, becoming the third generation of the family to lead FM Conway. That same year, the firm was found liable for defective ductwork at Twickenham Stadium.

During May 2023, FM Conway bought Essex-based drainage contractor Flowline out of administration, saving 164 jobs in the process. In January 2024, FM Conway replaced an existing road surface in Westminster using 92% recycled materials; this was believed to be the highest level then achieved on a British road.

During October 2024, it was announced that the France-based construction company Vinci had agreed terms to purchase FM Conway. This acquisition was completed in early 2025; Joanne Conway stepped down as the firm's chair and CEO while Andrew Hansen was appointed managing director.

In its final year as an independent business (year to 31 March 2025), FM Conway grew turnover 5% to £608m (2024: £580m) and pre-tax profit 12% to £33.0m (2024: £29.4m); operating profit was £46.1 (2024: £42.9m).

In an August 2025 incident, FM Conway released more than 15 tonnes of bitumen into the River Thames at its Gravesend facility, prompting a recovery operation by the Port of London Authority.

In June 2026, Westminster City Council awarded FM Conway an 8.5-year contract (with a four-year extension option) to maintain and improve the city’s roads, pavements, and public spaces, with an estimated total value of £1.25bn over 12.5 years.

== Notable projects ==
- Dover Marine Station, 2014
- Putney Bridge refurbishment, completed in 2015
- Maidstone United F.C. north stand, completed in 2017
- Millennium Bridge repairs completed in 2023, having repainted the bridge in 2016
- Blackfriars Bridge refurbishment, completed in 2024
- Hammersmith Bridge restoration, due to be completed in 2024
