= Anti-Seliger =

Anti-Seliger is a forum of civil and environmental activists that took place from 17 to 20 June 2011 in Russia, in the Khimki Forest near Moscow. The initiative to hold the forum has been proposed by the Movement in Defence of the Khimki Forest.

According to the leader of the movement, Yevgenia Chirikova, Anti-Seliger is an alternative to the pro-Kremlin forum at Lake Seliger. On the other hand, it is a place for meetings and discussions for civil activists, who want to unite and stand on their rights.

The organisers had invited civil and eco-activists, politicians, artists, and all active citizens who are willing to support the protection of nature and civil society development. The programme included lectures, musical and literary performances, exhibitions, competitions, debates, walks and tree planting in the Khimki forest.

Speakers included Yevgenia Chirikova, journalist Oleg Kashin, democracy activist Oleg Kozlovsky, former Speaker of the Federation Council Sergey Mironov, the leader of Yabloko Party Sergey Mitrokhin, politologist Alexander Morozov, anti-corruption activist Alexei Navalny, a leader of the Solidarity movement Boris Nemtsov, the head of Transparency International—Russia Elena Panfilova, journalists Valery Panyushkin and Leonid Parfenov, art critic Artemy Troitsky, popular blogger Ilya Varlamov and others.

Some other well-known Russians did not participate, but endorsed the event including State Duma deputy Gennady Gudkov and human rights activist Lyudmila Alexeyeva.

The participants were provided with some tents, as well as hot meals, toilet and washing facilities as well as transportation by buses from Moscow. Two requirements were imposed on the participants during their stay: respect for each other and abstention from drinking alcohol.

The forum was, at least in part, paid for from donations of individual supporters and opposition organisations.

On 15 June the organisers sent a letter to Russia's president Dmitry Medvedev asking him to ensure that the work of the forum is not impeded. Despite presence of some police on site, there have been no reports of any conflicts or violence from either side.

Yevgenia Chirikova was prediction the next Anti-Seliger to be held probably in August 2012.
