= Vinci SA =

French concessions and construction company

VINCI SA

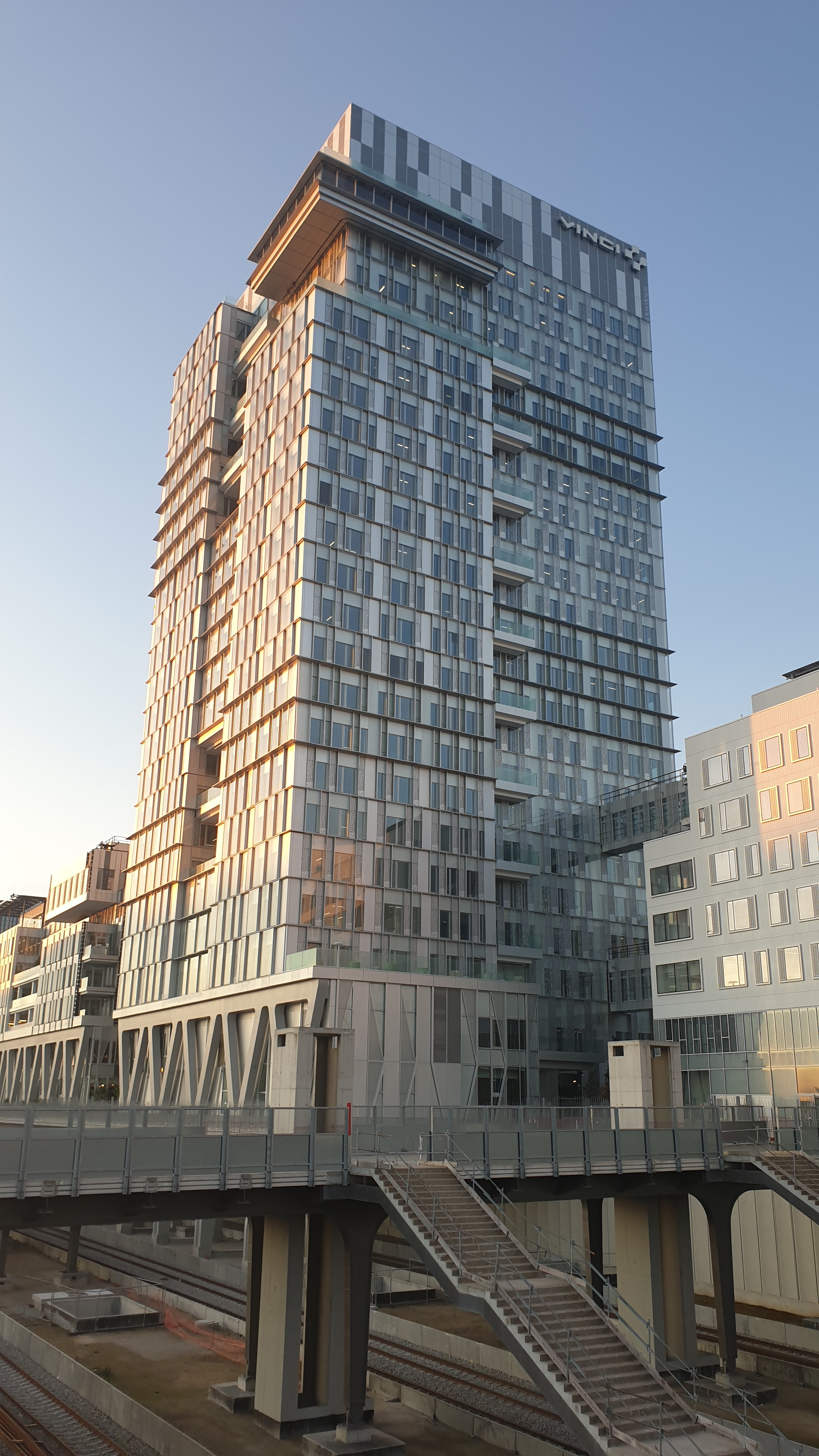
- Vinci headquarters in Nanterre, near Paris (2021)
- Type: Public (Société Anonyme)
- Traded as: Euronext Paris: DG; CAC 40 component
- ISIN: FR0000125486
- Industry: Construction
- Founded: 1899; 127 years ago
- Founders: Alexandre Giros; Louis Loucheur
- Headquarters: 1973 blvd de la Défense, Nanterre, France
- Area served: Worldwide
- Key people: Xavier Huillard (Chairman); Pierre Anjolras (CEO)
- Services: Infrastructure and property construction, transport infrastructure concessions (motorways, tunnels, airports, bridges), energy infrastructure and services
- Revenue: ▲€71.6 billion (2024)
- Operating income: ▲€8.8 billion (2024)
- Net income: ▲€5.3 billion (2024)
- Total assets: ▲€129.5 billion (2024)
- Total equity: ▲€34 billion (2024)
- Number of employees: 280,000 (2024)
- Divisions: Vinci Autoroutes (Autoroutes du Sud de la France, Cofiroute, Escota, Arcour), Vinci Concessions (airports, stadiums, highways), Vinci Energies, Cobra IS, Vinci Construction
- Website: www.vinci.com

Vinci (French pronunciation: [vɛ̃si]; corporately styled VINCI) is a French concessions and construction company founded in 1899 as Société Générale d'Entreprises. Its head office is in Nanterre, in the western suburbs of Paris. Vinci is listed on Euronext's Paris stock exchange and is a member of the Euro Stoxx 50 index.

== History ==
The company was founded by Alexandre Giros and Louis Loucheur as Société Générale d'Entreprises S.A. (SGE) in 1899. SGE was owned by Compagnie générale d'électricité (CGE), later Alcatel, from 1966 until 1981, when Saint-Gobain acquired a majority stake.

Companies acquired by SGE include Sogea (a civil engineering firm founded in 1878), bought in 1986, Campenon Bernard (a civil engineering and development firm founded in 1920), bought in 1988, and Norwest Holst (a British civil engineering firm founded in 1969 by the merger of Holst & Co, established in 1918, and Norwest Construction, established in 1923), bought in 1991.

In 1988, SGE was acquired by Compagnie générale des eaux, which was later renamed Vivendi. In 2000, the company changed its name to Vinci.

During 2001, Vinci acquired Groupe GTM, which was a combination of Dumez (founded in 1880) and GTM (founded in 1891). One year later, the British-based business Norwest Holst was renamed Vinci plc.

The company went on to acquire Autoroutes du Sud de la France (the Southern Freeways Company) in 2006, and Bachy-Soletanche, the world's second-largest geotechnical specialist contractor (after Bauer) in February 2007. It also bought the UK operations of Taylor Woodrow Construction for £74m in September 2008.

During August 2009, Vinci acquired a portion of the troubled contractor Haymills. One month later, it acquired the French engineering firm Cegelec from the Qatar Investment Authority in exchange for €1.18 billion ($1.69 billion). During February 2010, it bought the European aggregates businesses of Tarmac from Anglo American in exchange for £250 million. It also purchased Meteor Parking from the Go-Ahead Group in September 2010.

During the early 2010s, the company was awarded multiple contracts to construct portions of London's Crossrail project. In 2012, Vinci signed a deal to buy ANA Aeroportos de Portugal in exchange for €3,080 million. During December 2013, Vinci was awarded a contract worth €440 million to build an express-lane highway system in Atlanta, Georgia.

During 2014, Vinci sold 75% of the shares of Vinci Park to a consortium Ardian Infrastructure and Crédit Agricole Assurances; Vinci Park then became Indigo. In June 2016, Vinci sold the remaining 25.4% ex-Vinci Park shares to the consortium Ardian Infrastructure and Crédit Agricole Assurances.

During May 2015, Vinci and Orix were jointly awarded a 45-year contract to operate Itami Airport and Kansai International Airport in Osaka Prefecture, Japan, under a deal valued at around $18 billion.

In March 2017, the company won the concession to operate the international airport at Salvador, Bahia for 30 years. During October 2017, the Australian construction contractor Seymour Whyte was purchased by Vinci. In November 2017, the company invested in Sweden to acquire Eitech and Infratek, specialists in electrical works and engineering.

Between 2017 and 2020, Vinci, as part of a joint venture with Balfour Beatty and Systra, was awarded multiple contracts to work on Britain's High Speed 2 project.

In May 2019, Vinci acquired a 50.01% stake in Gatwick Airport; at the time of the transaction, the company pledged to invest £1.1 billion into passenger improvements at the airport by 2023.

Throughout 2020, the company's activities were heavily influenced by the COVID-19 pandemic; strict guidelines were implemented at its workplaces amongst other consequences. In the UK, Vinci was involved in the construction of several specialist hospitals.

During October 2020, Vinci issued a €5.2 billion ($6.08 billion) offer to the Spanish construction conglomerate ACS Group to acquire its ACS Industrial division; this transaction was completed during the following year. Additional arrangements between the two companies led to the creation of a joint venture focused on the renewable energy sector.

On 7 April 2021, Vinci was awarded a 30-year concession to operate the following Brazilian airports: Manaus-Brig. Eduardo Gomes International Airport, Tabatinga International Airport, Tefé Airport, Rio Branco International Airport, Cruzeiro do Sul International Airport, Porto Velho-Gov. Jorge Teixeira de Oliveira International Airport, and Boa Vista International Airport.

In October 2024, Vinci agreed terms to purchase FM Conway.

== Ownership ==
The breakdown of shareholders at 31 December 2019 is as follows:

- Institutional investors outside France – 57.2%
- Institutional investors inside France – 17.1%
- Individual shareholders – 6.8%
- Employees – 8.8%
- Qatar Investment Authority – 5%
- Treasury stock – 8.3%

== Financial data ==
Financial Data in euro billions
Year	2010	2011	2012	2013	2014	2015	2016	2017	2018	2019	2020	2021	2022	2023
Sales	33,571	36,956	38,634	40,338	38,703	38,518	38,073	40,248	43,519	48,053	43,234	49,396	61,675	68,838
EBIT	3,434	3,660	3,651	3,767	4,243	3,715	4,118	4,607	4,997	5,734	2,459	4,723	6,824	8,357
Net result	1,776	1,904	1,917	1,962	2,486	2,046	2,505	2,747	2,983	3,260	1,015	2,597	4,259	4,702
Net debt	13,060	17,164	16,210	17,552	17,134	15,001	13,938	14,001	15,554	21,654	17,989	19,266	18,536	16,126
Staff	179,527	183,320	192,701	190,704	185,293	185,452	183,487	194,428	211,233	222,397	217,731	219,299	271,648	279,426

Source: VINCI

== Competitors ==
Main competitors for VINCI
VINCI Autoroutes: Abertis; Mundys; Eiffage; Brisa; Vinci Airports: ENAIRE; Groupe ADP; Fraport; MAHB	VINCI Energies in France: Engie Energie Services; Spie; Eiffage Énergie; Bouygues Energies & Services; outside France: Siemens; Spie; Bilfinger; ThyssenKrupp Industrial Solutions; Minimax; Burkhalter; Alpiq	EUROVIA in France: Colas Group; Eiffage Infrastructures; LafargeHolcim; outside France: Heidelberg Materials; Cemex; Royal BAM Group; Strabag; Amey plc; Kier Group; Balfour Beatty; Tarmac; Conway; Aggregate Industries; Skanska; Metrostav; Cormac	VINCI Construction in France: Bouygues; Eiffage Construction; Fayat Group; NGE; Spie Batignolles; Demathieu Bard; Léon Grosse; outside France: Royal BAM Group; Balfour Beatty; Kier; Laing O'Rourke; Strabag; Skanska; Porr; Budimex; Metrostav; Trevi; Bauer AG; Keller Group

Source: VINCI Annual report 2016

== Turnover analysis ==
As of 2013, the turnover was split as follows:

- design and construction of works (35.5%): primarily in the building, civil engineering and hydraulics
- design, execution, and maintenance of energy and telecom infrastructures (26.5%; Vinci Energies);
- construction, renovation and upkeep of transport infrastructures (19.7%; Eurovia): roads, highways, and rail roads. The group is also active in urban design and granulate production (No. 1 in France);
- sub-contracted infrastructure management (16.3%; Vinci Concessions): primarily managing roads and highways (mainly through Autoroutes du Sud de la France and Cofiroute), airport activities;
- other (2%)

Net sales break down geographically as follows: France (58.9%), Europe (25.4%), North America (3.9%), Africa (3.5%) and other (8.3%).

In 2020, Vinci UK turnover was £858.5m, with pre-tax profit of £16.2m. However, by 2024, Vinci UK had endured two consecutive years of losses. Vinci Construction UK (comprising Taylor Woodrow Construction, Vinci Building and Vinci Facilities) made a pre-tax loss of £51.4m in 2023 (2022: £43.5m pre-tax loss) on £1.34bn of turnover (2022: £1.24bn).

During early 2024, the company announced that its turnover had risen by 12% to €69 billion, which was reportedly a 12 year high.

== Notable projects ==
Vinci and its predecessor companies have been involved in many notable projects including:

- Gariep Dam completed in 1971
- Tour Montparnasse completed in 1972
- Centre Georges Pompidou completed in 1977
- Yamoussoukro Basilica completed in 1989
- the new visitor entrance to the Louvre completed in 1989
- Channel Tunnel completed in 1994
- Pont de Normandie completed in 1995
- Stade de France completed in 1998
- Rio–Antirrio Bridge completed in 2004
- Whiston Hospital completed in 2013
- Atlantic Bridge, Panama completed in 2019

== Criticism ==
Vinci is involved in construction of the first 43 km of the Moscow–Saint Petersburg motorway through the valuable Khimki Forest. This construction has raised many protests in Russia, 75% of the local community – about 208,000 citizens of Khimki – oppose the project. There have also been numerous human rights abuses surrounding the project, with journalists and activists arrested and assaulted.

Vinci attracted protests in relation to its project to build an airport in Notre-Dame-des-Landes near Nantes, expected to become the third largest airport in France and being built on a site of 2,000 hectares of woodland and marsh with an acknowledged social and ecological value. This project was financed through a public-private partnership with profits going to Vinci. In November 2012, protests took place to prevent the expulsion of villagers and farmers who were struggling to protect their environment who were receiving support at both a national and international level.

Vinci's Norwest Holst and Taylor Woodrow were revealed as subscribers to the UK's Consulting Association, exposed in 2009 for operating an illegal construction industry blacklist. Vinci was later one of eight businesses involved in the 2014 launch of the Construction Workers Compensation Scheme, condemned as a "PR stunt" by the GMB union, and described by the Scottish Affairs Committee as "an act of bad faith".

=== Russian invasion of Ukraine ===
Vinci SA has faced scrutiny for its continued presence in Russia amid the war in Ukraine. According to Le Monde, despite halting new investments, the company remains active through its subsidiaries, raising concerns about its ongoing operations and ethical responsibilities.
