= Xavier Huillard =

French business executive (born 1954)

- Born: 27 June 1954 (age 71); Paris, France
- Education: Lycée Lakanal; Lycée Louis-le-Grand
- Alma mater: École Polytechnique; École des ponts ParisTech
- Occupation: CEO of Vinci

Xavier Huillard (born 27 June 1954) is a French business executive, and the chairman and CEO of Vinci SA. He has been CEO since 2006, and chairman since 2010.

== Early life and education ==
Huillard graduated from École Polytechnique and École des ponts ParisTech.

== Career ==
Prior to joining Vinci, Huillard was chairman and CEO of Sogea. He has worked for Vinci since March 1998, as deputy general manager, chairman of Vinci Construction, and chairman of Vinci Energies.

He has been the chairman of the Institut de l’Entreprise since 2011.

== Other activities ==
- Air Liquide, Independent Member of the Board of Directors (since 2021)

Business positions
| Preceded by Yves-Thibault de Silguy | CEO of Vinci; 2010–present | Succeeded by Incumbent |
