= Moscow–Saint Petersburg motorway =

Key transport link in Russia

Federal Highway M11
- Федеральная автомобильная дорога M11
- Moscow-Saint Petersburg motorway
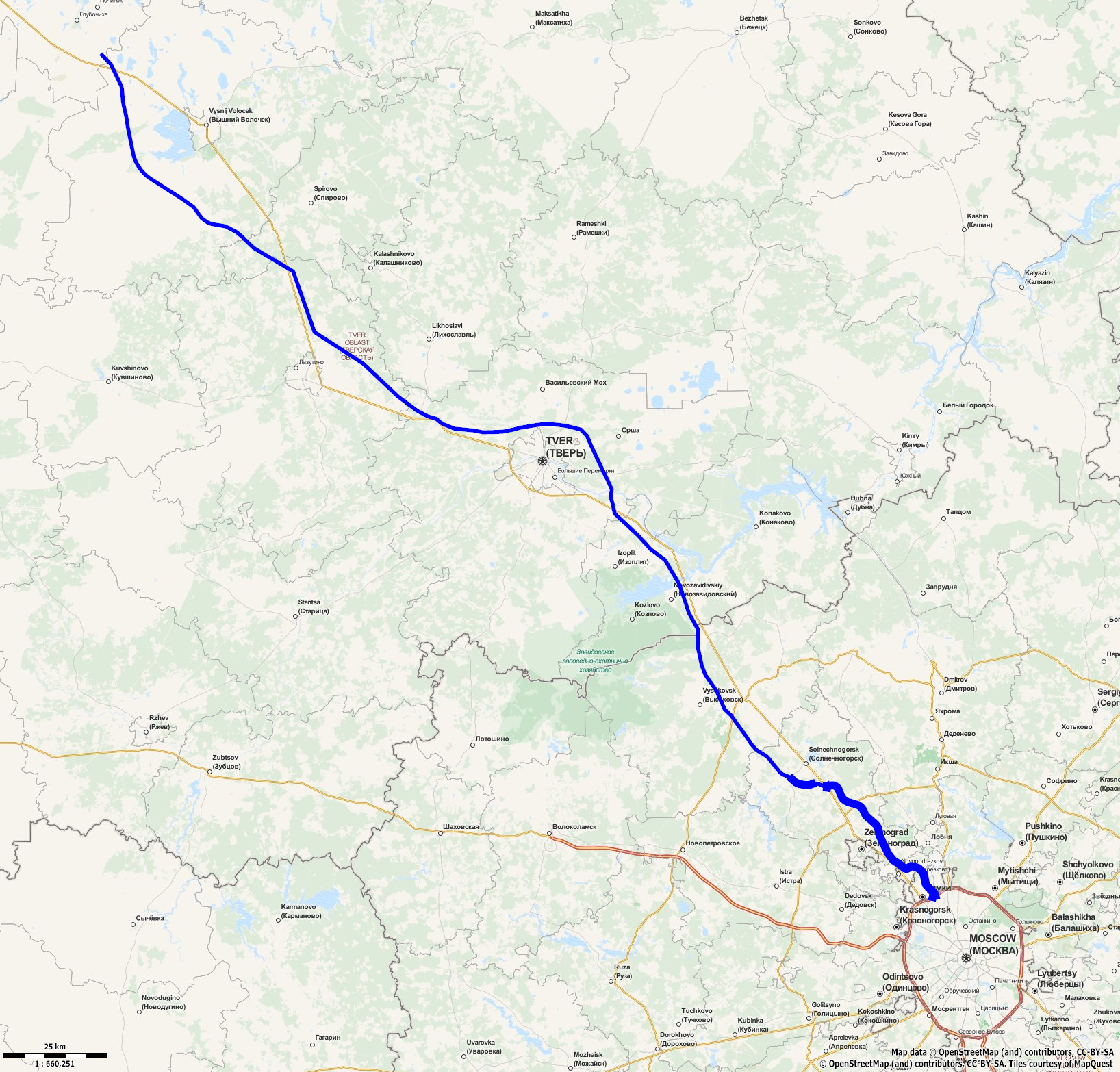

Route information
- Part of AH8
- Length: 684 km (425 mi)

Major junctions
- South end: MKAD in Moscow
- North end: A-118 in Saint Petersburg

Location
- Country: Russia

Highway system
- Russian Federal Highways
← M 10	→ M 12

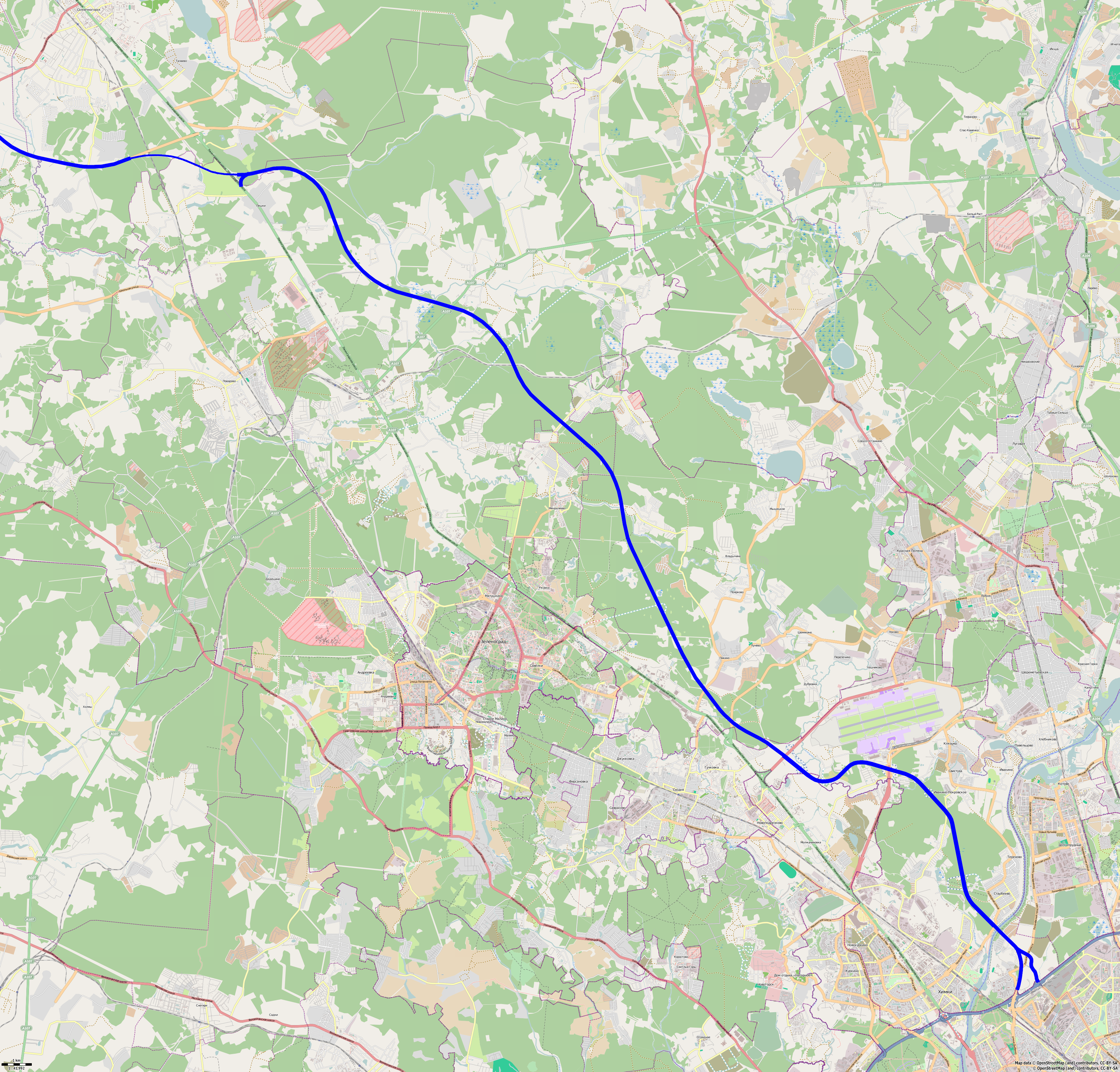
Headway map.

The Moscow–Saint Petersburg motorway (Russian: Автомагистраль Москва — Санкт-Петербург, romanized: Avtomagistral' Moskva-Sankt-Peterburg), designated as the М11 Neva, is a Russian federal highway in the European part of Russia, running parallel to the M10 highway, serving from the federal cities of Moscow to St. Petersburg. The M11 goes through Moscow, Tver, Novgorod, and Leningrad Oblasts, running past the cities of Khimki, Zelenograd, Solnechnogorsk, Klin, Tver, Vyshny Volochyok, Valday, Veliky Novgorod, Chudovo, and Tosno.

The M11 is a category 1A highway, defined as a motorway, which has two to five lanes on each side and a calculated speed limit of around 150 km/h. The M11 is one of the most recent federal highways. Construction began in 2010. It was planned that the highway would be opened in 2018, before the start of Russia FIFA World Cup. The M11 was completed and opened in November 2019. With the M1, St. Petersburg is the second city in Russia after Ufa that has a connection to Moscow with two federal highways. The M11's total length is 684 kilometres (425 mi). The cost of the project is ₽152.8 billion, of which ₽15.96 billion are invested by the contractor. As of July 2024, all sections of the highway were open to traffic.

The plans for and construction of the motorway has been met with strong protest from environmentalist groups and nearby residents, mainly due to the fact that the motorway would go through the Khimki Forest.

== Route description ==
The M11 is parallel to the M10 highway. It starts in Moscow, running via Moscow Oblast (90 km or 56 mi), Tver Oblast (253 km or 157 mi), Novgorod Oblast (233 km or 145 mi), Leningrad Oblast (75 km or 47 mi) to its destination in Saint Petersburg.

=== Characteristics ===
The highway has the following characteristics:

Four to ten lanes where each lane is 3.75 meters wide, (12.3 ft). The dividing strip is 5 meters side, (16 ft) with a crub width of 3.5 m, (11 ft). The shoulder is 3.5 meters wide.

This highway has 32 interchanges, 167 overpasses, and 85 bridges.

The minimum radius of the curve is 1,200 m (3,900 ft), and in the longitudinal profile for a concave curve 8,000 m (26,000 ft), and for a convex curve 30,000 m (98,000 ft). The maximum longitudinal slope is 30%.

The road passes through four regions of Russia, where the climate varies from moderately continental (Moscow Oblast, Tver Oblast) to maritime (Novgorod Oblast, Leningrad Oblast), which affects the highway's design.

The project received the necessary permits and approvals, including a positive response from the state environment review at the stage of investment basis and the FAU "Glavgos Expertiza of Russia" at the stage of approval of the engineering project. Public hearings were held in May 2005.

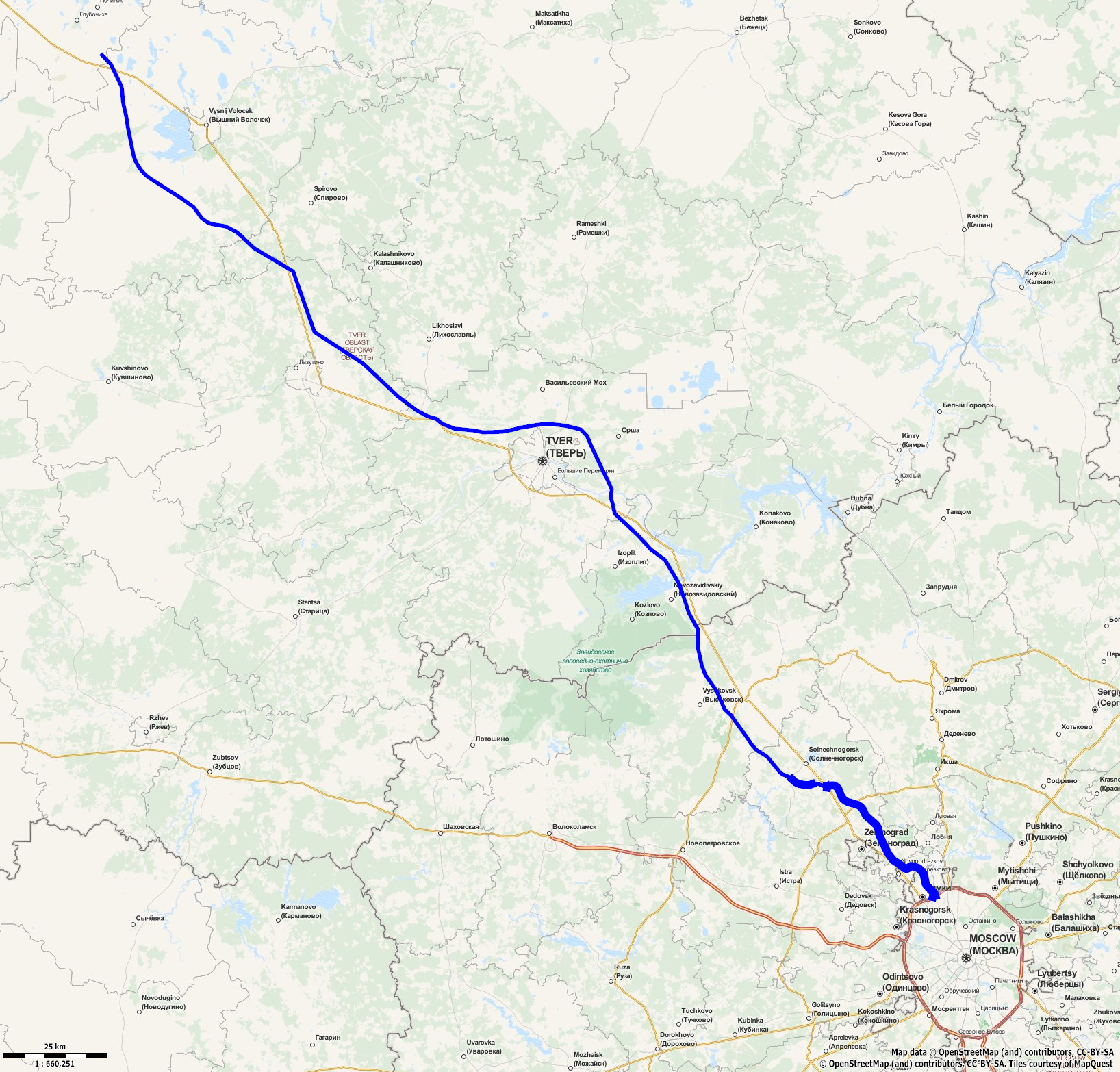
Map of the M11 in the Moscow and Tver Oblasts,

A centralized automated traffic management system installed at the head section of the Moscow–St. Petersburg motorway. Modern communication is provided using the latest advances in information technology, evacuation services, emergency communication points. Separation barriers and lighting installed for the entire main sections of the motorway.

In order to reduce noise pollution, the project also implements the construction of noise barriers along the route.

=== Tolls ===
The concessionaires of the Moscow–Solnechnogorsk section from 15 to 58 km (9.3 to 36.0 mi) originally planned that the average weighted toll fare for the main section of the road would be ₽3.62/km (₽5.83/mi), excluding VAT at 2007 prices. The tariff varies depending on the vehicle category, time of day, frequency of use of the route, etc.

The average fare on the tollway approximately ₽2–₽2.5 per kilometer (₽3.2–₽4.0/mi). Passage through the site at the entrance to St. Petersburg of 37 kilometres (23 mi) length will cost ₽2.2/km (₽3.5/mi). On the other toll sections of the route (the central part of the road passing through Veliky Novgorod, Tver Oblast and parts of the Moscow Oblast) the journey will cost about ₽1/km (₽1.6/mi) for the driver of the car. The entire travel would cost around ₽600. In June 2013, Sergey Kelbakh, chairman of the State Company "Russian Highways" ("Avtodor"), stated that the price of travel on the road can be about ₽1100–₽1200 in the St. Petersburg International Economic Forum.

On January 25, 2016, Russian President Vladimir Putin criticized the fare that was set on Moscow–Solnechnogorsk section stating that nobody would use the motorway when the tolls are inflated to high prices.

== History ==
The development of a replacement for the existing Moscow–Saint Petersburg M10 highway was conducted over a long period of time, with the original concept being included in the general plan of Moscow Federal City and the Moscow Oblast in the early 1970s.

The load of the federal highway M10 now exceeds at least three times the maximum. With a standard throughput of 40,000 cars per day to date, the traffic intensity reaches 130,000–170,000 cars. As a result of exceeding the maximum permissible load, the average speed along the M10 highway at the entrance to Moscow is 10 km/h (6 mph), falling at a peak time of up to 5–7 km/h (3–4 mph). The accident rate on the M10 track exceeds almost three times the national average. The level of air pollution in the territory around the highway exceeds 3 to 5 times the norm.

=== Planning ===
The decision to build the highway was taken by the Ministry of Transport, and the initiative came from Russian President Vladimir Putin. In January 2006, citizens were given an investment study of the construction of the Moscow–Solnechnogorsk section from 15 to 58 km (9.3 to 36.0 mi).

In February 2008, a concessionaire was chosen from a list of private companies for the construction of the first section. Of the three companies that participated, the Ministry of Transport of Russia chose the North-West Concession Company (NWCC), a coalition that is composed of companies such as Vinci. At that time, the estimated cost of building the entire route was approximately ₽350 billion.

On 27 July 2009, the "NWCC" and other leaders signed a concession contract for the Moscow–Solnechnogorsk section of the motorway with the Federal Road Agency, in the presence of the Minister of Transport, Igor Levitin.

On 26 April 2010, Vnesheconombank and Sberbank signed an agreement to grant the "NWCC" a ₽29.2 billion credit with the order to build the first section of the motorway. On 26 August 2010, President Dmitry Medvedev suspended the construction due to the protests by environment activists against the motorway route through Khimki Forest. According to his decision, additional public and expert discussions are to be carried out.

=== Construction ===
In December 2010, the Russian government decided to start the construction through Khimki Forest. Speaking in Saint Petersburg, Deputy Prime Minister Sergei Ivanov stated that new saplings would be planted on a territory of 500 hectares (1,200 acres) to compensate for the deforesting of about 100 hectares (250 acres) of the Khimki Forest. On 29 September 2011, the construction of the Moscow–Solnechnogorsk section from 15 to 58 km (9.3 to 36.0 mi) began.

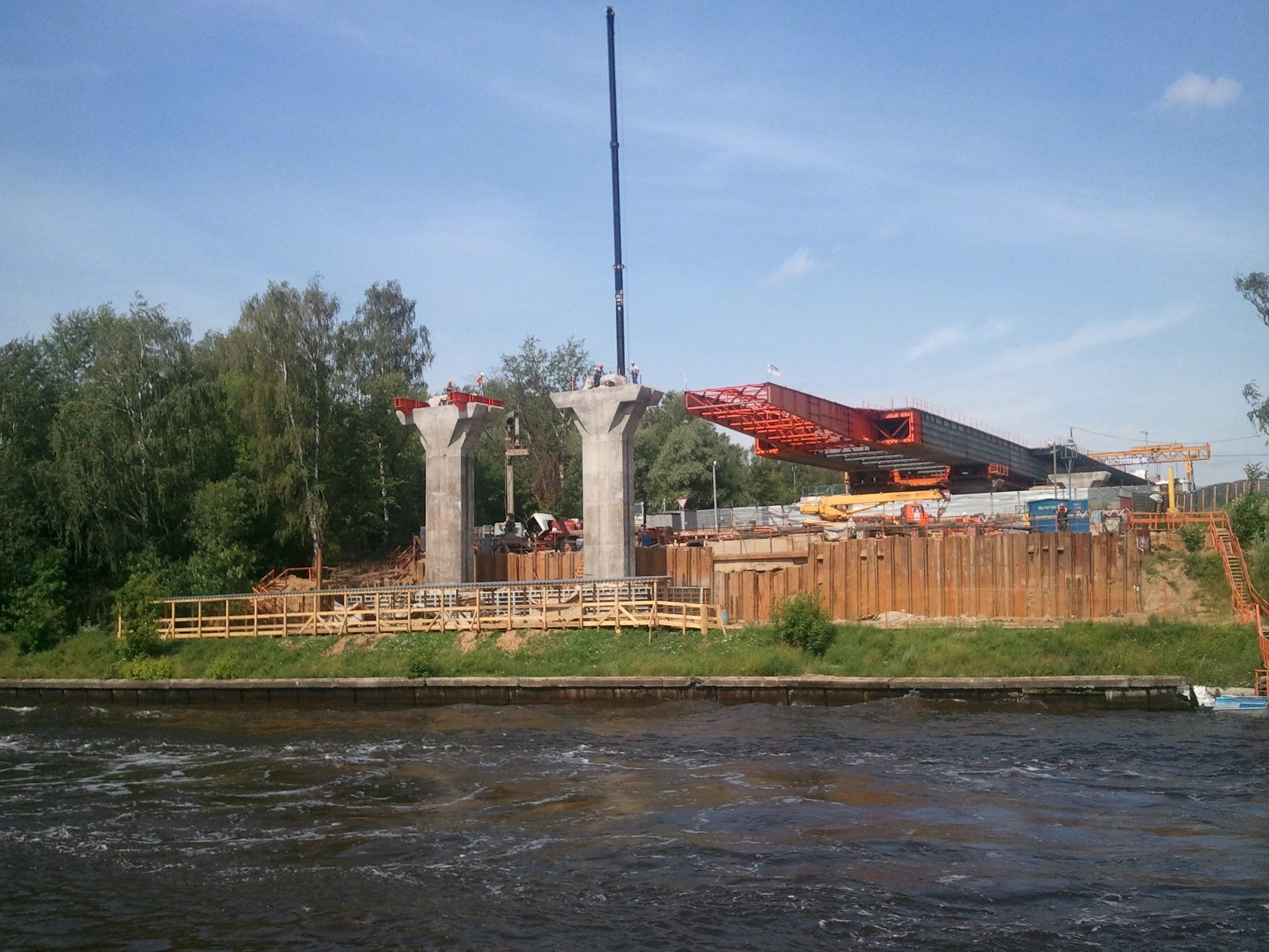
Construction of a bridge over the canal in Moscow in July 2012

In January 2012, the Businovskaya Interchange with the Moscow Ring Road was renovated to create a starting point for the M11 motorway. The interchange was put into operation despite not being completed on 23 December 2014, together with the M11's starting point. It was until June 2015 that the reconstruction of the junction would be completed. Today, the Businovskaya Interchange is the only five-level junction in Russia, with the maximum height of the highest level being 35 metres (115 ft) above ground level. In the spring of 2012, preparations were being made the construction of the 58 to 97 km section.

In June 2012, Russian Prime Minister Dmitry Medvedev signed a decree ordering the end of the concession agreement for the 646–684 km portion of the motorway in Leningrad Oblast near St. Petersburg. The contract will be expired for a period of 30 years. The competition for the concession agreement would occur from 2012 to 2013 in the autumn season while the planned construction period is 2014–2016. On 18 November 2014, Two Capitals Highway LLC was declared the winner of the competition and the company signed the concession agreement on the financing, construction and operation of the road at the 543–646 km and the 646–684 km sections with state highway company Avtodor.

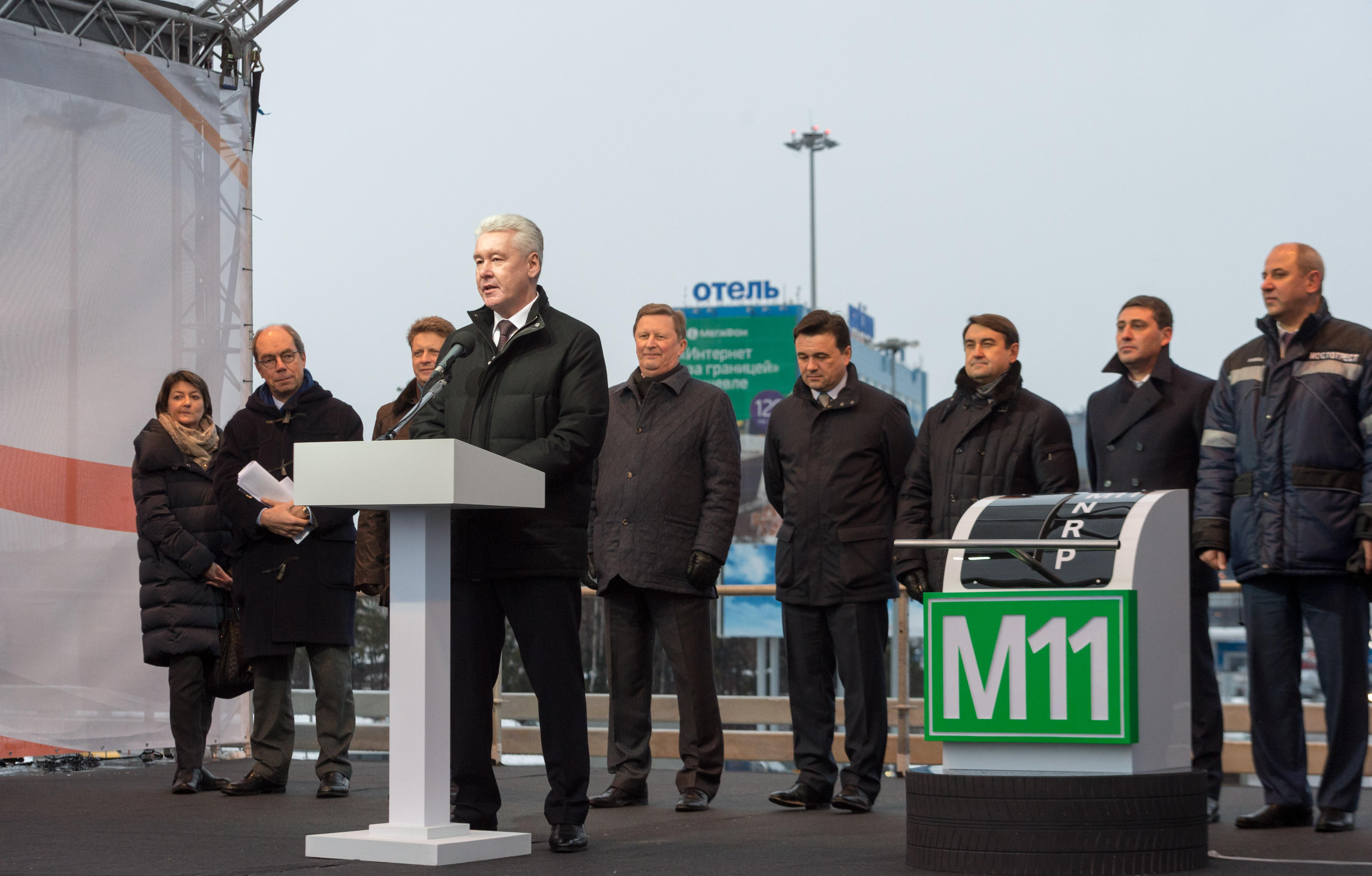
Opening of traffic on the first section of the M11 motorway in December 2014

In November 2014, the Vyshny Volochyok bypass section (258–334 km) became the first section of the motorway to be completed. The section's toll in the daytime is ₽240 and its commencement will start at September 21, 2015. On 23 December 2014, the Moscow–Solnechnogorsk section (15 km to 58 km) was completed and opened. The section was tolled on 23 November 2015. The toll from Moscow to Sheremetyevo was from ₽80 to ₽250, and from Sheremetyevo to Solnechnogorsk will cost from ₽160 to ₽500 rubles, depending on the time of the traffic. On 17 June 2015, construction of the M11 started in the Leningrad and Novgorod Oblasts. As of December 2015, all designed sections of the road are under construction or under preparation for construction, except for the 58 km to 149 km section, where no contractor was found.

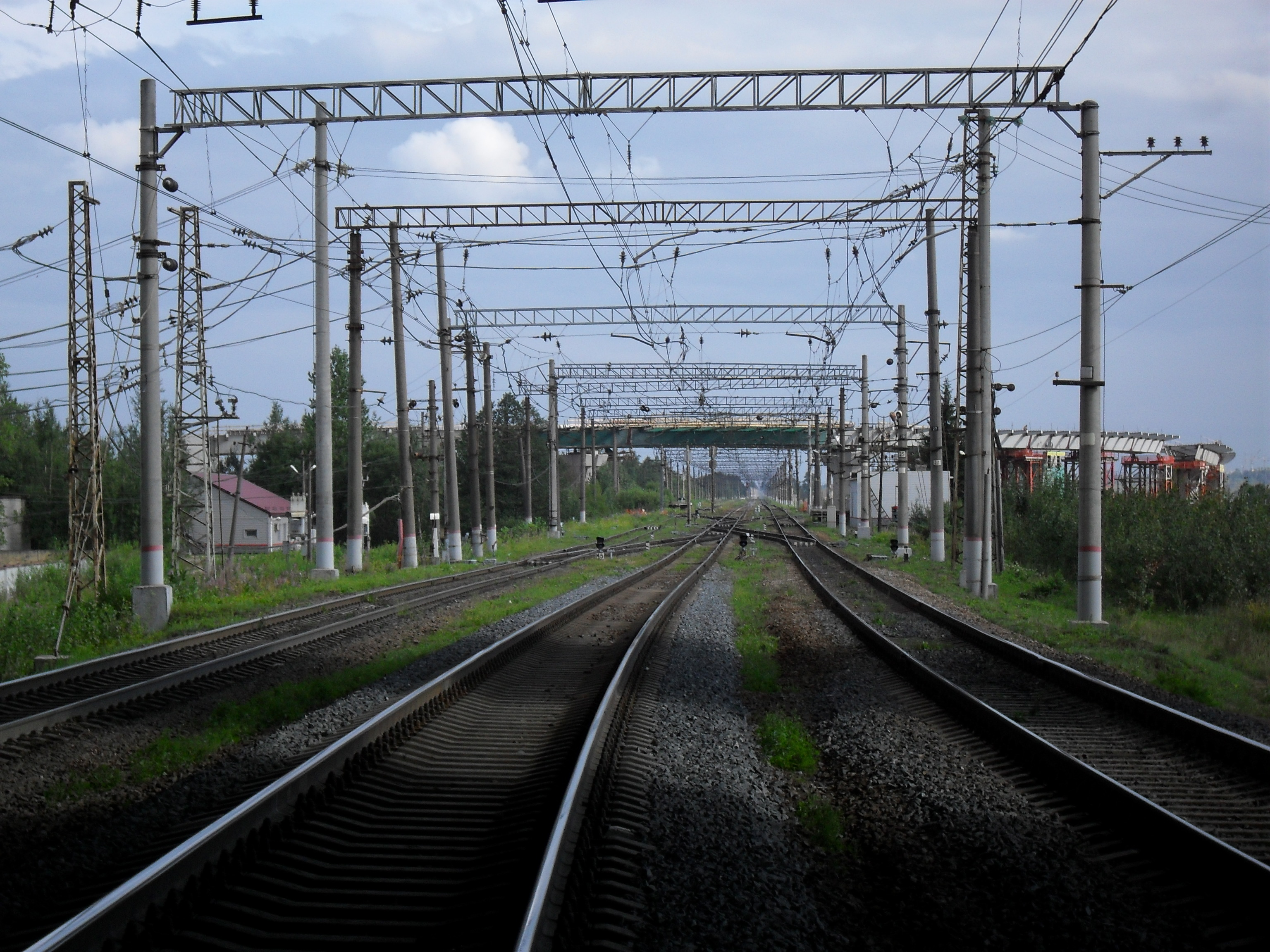
Construction of the western end of the M11 motorway in Saint Petersburg in July 2018.

In December 2017, Avtodor completed and opened traffic on the 208 km to 258 km section of the motorway, which would bypass the city of Torzhok in Tver Oblast. This section would connect to the Vyshny Volochyok bypass section. In June 2018, the Vyshny Volochyok–Myasnoy Bor (334 km to 543 km) section was completed and opened. Starting at Vyshny Volochyok, the M11 would go through Novgorod Oblast and pass by cities such as Bologoye, Okulovka, and Borovichi and finally end at the town of Myasnoy Bor, which is less than 35 km away from Veliky Novgorod. On 1 September 2018, the Solnechnogorsk–Klin (58 km to 97 km) section was completed and opened. 3 days later on 4 September, the Russian Ministry of Transport announced that the M11 would be completed and open for traffic in 2019. A connection between the eastern end of the M11 and Dmitrovskoye Highway in Moscow was completed and opened a day later on 5 September.

In July 2019, Avtodor completed and opened traffic on the Klin–Tver (97 km to 149 km) section of the motorway, which would reduce travel time from Tver to Moscow and vice versa, as well as relieve Klin and the surrounding areas of traffic. A few months later, Avtodor completed the Myasnoy Bor–Tosno section (543 km to 646 km), having the motorway interchange with the A-120 highway in Tosno.

In November 2019, the press service of Rostekhnadzor's Northwest Department announced that construction of the motorway on sections done by Two Capitals Highway LLC is completed with the completion of the Tosno–Saint Petersburg (646 km to 684 km) section. The last section of the highway was completed on 16th July, 2024 and inaugurated by President Vladimir Putin.

== Controversies ==
=== Procedural concerns ===
In the beginning of 2017, Riga-based Russian-language media network Meduza predicted that the M11 would be only half ready for the 2018 FIFA World Cup due to numerous delays. The outlet stated that only a quarter of the route from St. Petersburg to Myasnoy Bor (near Veliky Novgorod) would be completed. One reason why is that many of the Russian contractors were on the verge of bankruptcy and therefore abandoned construction. Another reason is that the state had struggled to pay its workers, leading to protests and strikes from different contractors.

In February 2017, problems started to arise with the Turkish company "IC Ictas Insaat – Astaldi" (ICA), the general contractor of the 543 km–684 km section of the motorway, which was accused of unauthorized occupation of forest plots. Work of the highway almost stopped, threatening to delay the completion of the motorway before the 2018 FIFA World Cup even further. The ICA participated in the construction of the Western Rapid Diameter of St. Petersburg and did not pay money to some contractors. Therefore, it became a problematic partner during construction resulting in arbitration proceedings occurring underway. Now the same thing has happened with the construction of the motorway, and the ICA owes its subcontractors more than ₽5 billion. Part of the route passing through the Tver region, with a bridge over Shosha (97–149 km) due to the conflict with contractors will be ready no earlier than 2019–2020. The construction of the route bypassing Tver is going to start after 2020.

In August 2017, Minister of Transport Maksim Sokolov reported to the president that the route will not be ready for the 2018 FIFA World Cup.

=== Environmental concerns ===
The first section of the road going through the Khimki Forest

==== Khimki Forest ====
In 2010, problems with the construction of the road through the Khimki Forest arose due to protests from public organizations (the largest of which was the Movement for the Protection of the Khimki Forest), who disagreed with deforestation under the future track. By the end of July, the protesters managed to achieve the termination of work, but later the commission of the Government of the Russian Federation, chaired by Deputy Prime Minister Sergei Ivanov, whose meeting was held in December 2010, decided to approve the original route through the Khimki forest.

"The initial version of the Moscow-St. Petersburg route through the Khimki forest is absolutely justified and legitimate," Ivanov said. Members of the commission called this decision weighted and compromise. This decision was supported by Russian President Dmitry Medvedev (in summer 2010 he recognized the need to suspend work for a second examination). Aide to the President of the Russian Federation, Arkady Dvorkovich, noted that "after the President made a decision to suspend the construction of the highway and to hold additional consultations, a huge amount of work was done, which made it possible to seriously improve the project."

As part of the preparation for the construction and operation of the main section of the road, a set of environmental measures totalling 4 billion rubles was developed. In November 2011, the cabinet announced the allocation of 12 billion rubles for compensation measures for the reproduction of forest sites cut down during the construction of the high-speed highway.

==== Zavidovo ====
Conflict situation has developed around the passage of the road at the borders of Zavidovo. In 2007, Presidential Decree No. 654 of the Zavidovo border was extended eastward to the Moscow-St. Petersburg railway, which resulted in the planned toll road in the national park. At the same time, it was noted that in fact, this presidential decree did not come into force, since the Russian government has not yet signed a relevant resolution.

A number of public organizations opposed the construction of the route through the territory of Zavidovo, several street actions were organized. As a result, it was announced that the site of the specially protected natural area, through which the motorway is to pass, will be cut, and instead of it, Zavidovo will receive the territories in another place.
