= Khimki Forest =

Forest near Moscow, Russia

Coordinates: 55°56′6″N 37°26′48″E

Map of forest, including planned highway

Khimki Forest (Russian: Химкинский лес, romanized: Khimkinskiy les) is a forest near the Russian city of Moscow covering about 1000 hectares. It is part of the so-called "Green Belt" around Moscow. An $8 billion high speed road, the Moscow–Saint Petersburg motorway (M11), was proposed in the aughts to go through the forest to connect Moscow and Saint Petersburg. The proposed road called for the removal of a swath of the forest. The construction triggered large protests, which turned violent in July 2010. On 26 August 2010, President Dmitry Medvedev ordered the construction to be halted. Despite the protests, construction was slated to continue later that year.

== Protests over planned highway ==
=== History of opposition ===
The M11, a new toll motorway, was proposed to go through the forest. The roadway would connect Moscow and Saint Petersburg.

Following the completion and full opening of the M11 Moscow–Saint Petersburg motorway, the long-term environmental and social legacy of the Khimki Forest campaign has remained a touchstone for urban conservation battles in Russia. Independent monitoring reports and retrospective human rights analyses note that while the grassroots mobilization spearheaded by figures like Yevgenia Chirikova ultimately failed to prevent the highway's construction through the protected green belt, it succeeded in raising public awareness regarding corporate accountability, municipal transparency, and the physical safety of environmental defenders in the region.

The proposed road attracted local and international opposition due to deforestation and other environmental issues. The forest's fauna includes foxes, elk, wild boars and a number of species of insects and plants considered endangered.

Logging in the forest started on 14 July 2010, and activists immediately clashed with the construction workers. The activists included local people and a group called "Ecological Defense of the Moscow Region", along with Greenpeace Russia, and the "Left Front" civil movement. On 15 July 2010, environmentalists started to maintain a vigil to prevent the trees from being cut down. On July 28, 2010, dozens of anarchists and antifascists stormed government offices in Khimki. Windows were broken and the assailants left a graffiti with the text "Save the Russian Forest." On 22 August, 2,000 activists attended a concert that was held to protest the construction. On 22 August, two opposition leaders and a human rights activist who were participating in rallies marking the National Flag Day of Russia were detained. They claimed that they were detained "to prevent the action in defense of the Khimki Forest."

Russia's Supreme Court has ruled that the construction of the highway is not illegal. The activists' Khimki Forest Defense movement has filed a suit with the European Court of Human Rights in Strasbourg.

In August, the country's largest political party, United Russia asked the President to stop the construction. Reuters analysts speculated the move was an attempt by the party to "pre-empt wider protest actions" which could have lowered the high popularity enjoyed by the Kremlin and the party.

In late August, rock star Bono of the group U2, while his band was on tour in Russia, took a high-profile stand against the highway construction. Asking Russian rock star Yuri Shevchuk, an outspoken critic of the highway's planned route, who had made headlines confronting Vladimir Putin in a face-to-face meeting in May, to join him on stage at a concert, Bono and Shevchuk sang a Bob Dylan tune (Knockin' on Heaven's Door) in front of 60,000 people. Bono said in an interview that he regretted not raising the issue in his own meeting with the president.

=== Attacks ===
Various protesters and journalists have been attacked and intimidated by both the police and unknown assailants. Three journalists - Anatoliy Adamchuk from Zhukovskiye Vesti, Mikhail Beketov from Khimkinskaya Pravda and Oleg Kashin from Kommersant - have been beaten up in what are thought to be attacks linked to their coverage of the protests.

=== President Medvedev suspends the project ===
On 26 August 2010, President Dmitry Medvedev ordered the construction of the highway to be halted, and asked for a period of further discussion.

"Taking into account the amount of appeals [against the construction], I have made a decision...to suspend the implementation of the decree on the construction of the toll highway and to hold additional public and expert discussions."

One of the activists who had fought to protect the forest hailed the President's decision as "victory" for the activists. City district prefect and former environmental official Oleg Mitvol has stated that the motorway could be built through another area in the north of the capital. When he presented his idea to Mayor of Moscow Yuri Luzhkov, the mayor supported it. Aleksey Knizhnikov of the World Wide Fund for Nature (WWF) believes that if the logging was stopped right now, the forest would recover in a decade.

== The role of the French multinational Vinci S.A. ==
The French multinational Vinci jointly with some individuals from Lebanon and Syria owns 50% of the North-West Concession Company, the concessionaire of the project. Soon after President Medvedev put a halt on construction under pressure of the civil protests in August, 2010, Emanuel Quidet of the French Chamber of Commerce in Russia intervened, asking Medvedev to resume works as soon as possible. During the discussion, representatives of Vinci threatened Russian Government with 4 billion rubles (about 100 million euro) of compensations in case of a longer delay for the change of the routing.

The Movement to Defend Khimki Forest together with the Bankwatch CEE and through the UN Global Compact has written several letters to the executive board of Vinci, indicating environmental damage to the forest and human rights abuses, connected with the project. Vinci was asked to start discussion about changing the route and to intervene with the Russian authorities, but it refused to cooperate, claiming that it had no power to change the route, chosen by the Russian authorities, and denying any connection between the violence and the project.

== See also ==
- Antiseliger
- Environment of Russia
- Moscow–Saint Petersburg motorway
