= 2025 Novgorod Oblast gubernatorial election =

← 2022	12–14 September 2025	2030 →
- Turnout: 37.70% ▲4.90 pp
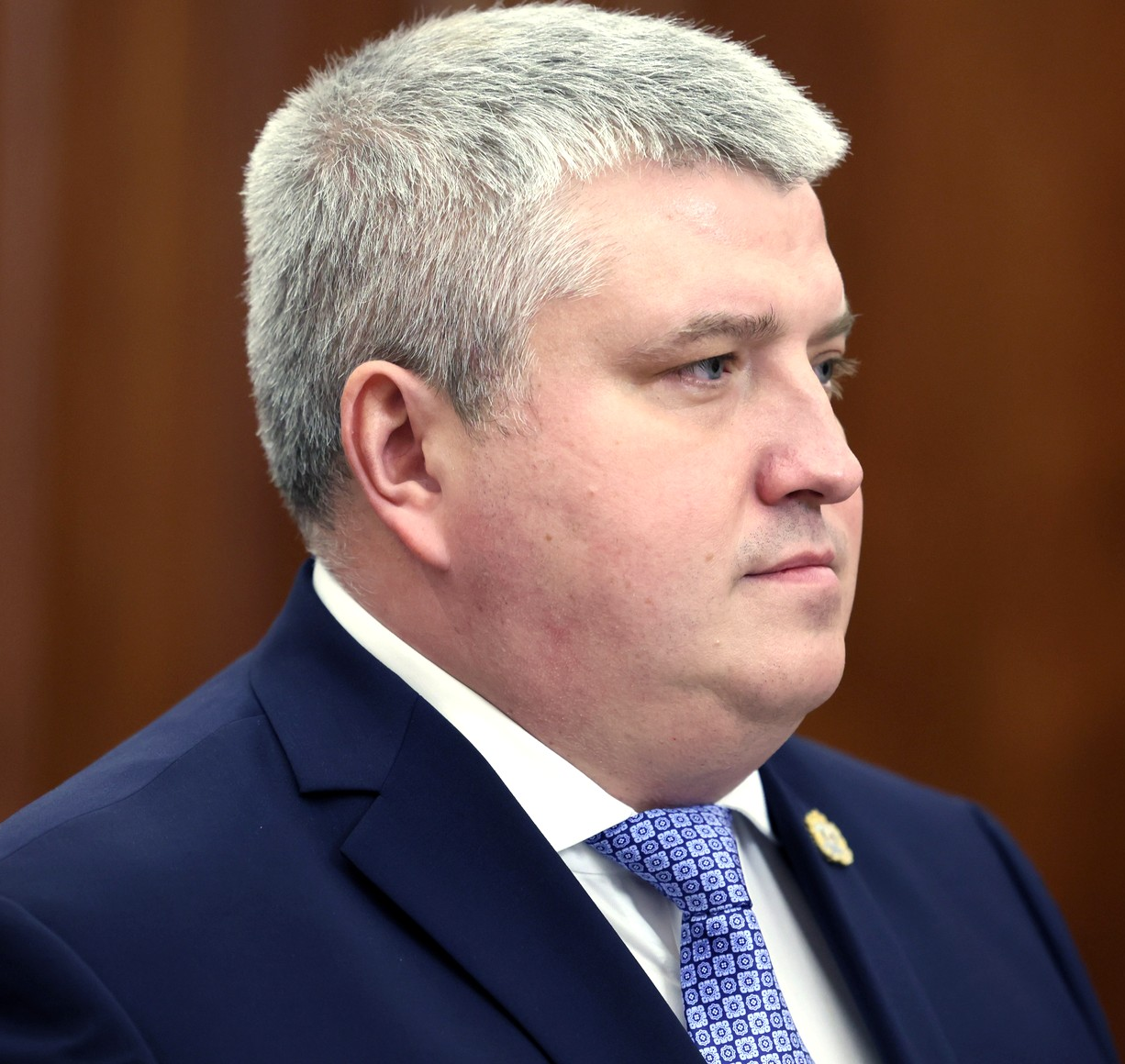
		CPRF	LDPR
Candidate	Aleksandr Dronov	Olga Yefimova	Aleksey Chursinov
Party	United Russia	CPRF	LDPR
Popular vote	109,606	25,387	16,804
Percentage	62.19%	14.40%	9.53%
	SR–ZP	RPPSS
Candidate	Nikolay Shvabovich	Nikolay Zakharov
Party	SR–ZP	Party of Pensioners
Popular vote	10,648	9,288
Percentage	6.04%	5.27%
- Election results by municipality
Governor before election
Aleksandr Dronov (acting)
United Russia
Governor-elect
Aleksandr Dronov
United Russia

The 2025 Novgorod Oblast gubernatorial election took place on 12–14 September 2025, on common election day. Acting Governor of Novgorod Oblast Aleksandr Dronov was elected for a full term in office.

== Background ==
Agency for Strategic Initiatives general director Andrey Nikitin was appointed acting Governor of Novgorod Oblast in February 2017, replacing two-term governor Sergey Mitin. Nikitin won 2017 election with 67.99% of the vote and was re-elected in 2022 with 77.03%. Nikitin was also mentioned as potential member of Mikhail Mishustin's Second Cabinet in 2024 but did not receive an appointment to the Government of Russia when it was formed in May 2024.

On February 7, 2025, Nikitin unexpectedly announced his resignation as Governor of Novgorod Oblast, with more than two years of his second term left, later that day Nikitin was appointed Deputy Minister of Transport in charge of digital transformation in the agency, replacing Dmitry Bakanov. First Deputy Governor Aleksandr Dronov became acting Governor of Novgorod Oblast after Nikitin's resignation, however, quite unusually President of Russia Vladimir Putin did not appoint an acting governor himself immediately following the vacancy. Dronov was viewed as frontrunner for the nomination but other candidates were allegedly considered, including former Russian-held Government of Zaporozhye Oblast chairman Anton Koltsov and Deputy Prosecutor-General of Russia Andrey Kikot. On March 4, 2025, President Putin held a meeting with Dronov and the next day Aleksandr Dronov was officially appointed acting Governor of Novgorod Oblast. On May 31, 2025, Aleksandr Dronov announced his intention to seek a full term in office.

== Candidates ==
In Novgorod Oblast candidates for Governor of Novgorod Oblast can be nominated only by registered political parties. Candidate for Governor of Novgorod Oblast should be a Russian citizen and at least 30 years old. Candidates for Governor of Novgorod Oblast should not have a foreign citizenship or residence permit. Each candidate in order to be registered is required to collect at least 10% of signatures of members and heads of municipalities. Also gubernatorial candidates present 3 candidacies to the Federation Council and election winner later appoints one of the presented candidates.

=== Declared ===
Candidate name, political party		Occupation	Status	Ref.
Aleksey Chursinov; Liberal Democratic Party		Member of Novgorod Oblast Duma (2016–present); 2022 gubernatorial candidate	Registered	
Aleksandr Dronov; United Russia	Aleksandr Dronov	Acting Governor of Novgorod Oblast (2025–present); Former First Deputy Governor of Novgorod Oblast (2020–2025)	Registered	
Nikolay Shvabovich; SR–ZP		Member of Duma of Veliky Novgorod (2018–present); Businessman	Registered	
Olga Yefimova; Communist Party		Aide to State Duma member Ivan Melnikov; Former Member of Novgorod Oblast Duma (2006–2011, 2016–2021); 2003, 2012, 2017 and 2022 gubernatorial candidate	Registered	
Nikolay Zakharov; Party of Pensioners		Member of Novgorod Oblast Duma (2024–present)	Registered	
Viktor Shalyakin; Yabloko		Retired Air Force Major	Failed to qualify	
Tatyana Yakovleva; Green Alternative		Nonprofit director	Failed to qualify	

=== Eliminated at the convention ===
- Yury Borovikov (United Russia), Rector of Yaroslav-the-Wise Novgorod State University (2017–present), former Member of Novgorod Oblast Duma (2020–2021)
- Vasily Yan (United Russia), Member of Duma of Veliky Novgorod (2023–present), theatre executive

=== Declined ===
- Anna Cherepanova (Yabloko), Member of Duma of Veliky Novgorod (2018–present), 2017 and 2022 gubernatorial candidate

=== Candidates for Federation Council ===
Incumbent Senator Sergey Mitin (United Russia) was not renominated.

Head candidate, political party	Candidates for Federation Council	Status
Aleksandr Dronov; United Russia	* Yevgeny Dietrich, former CEO of GTLK (2020–2025), former Minister of Transport of Russia (2018–2020) * Elena Pisareva, Senator from the Novgorod Oblast Duma (2021–present) * Oleg Strygin, Member of Novgorod Oblast Duma (2021–present), manufacturing executive	Registered
Viktor Shalyakin; Yabloko	* Anna Cherepanova, Member of Duma of Veliky Novgorod (2018–present), 2017 and 2022 gubernatorial candidate * Valery Kochnev, surgeon-endoscopist * Yelena Tulina, Member of Trubichino Council of Deputies (2010–2014, 2024–present), Russian and literature teacher	Failed to qualify

== Finances ==
All sums are in rubles.

Financial Report	Source	Chursinov	Dronov	Shalyakin	Shvabovich	Yakovleva	Yefimova	Zakharov
First		45,000	36,065,000	503,000	50,000	22,000	250,000	42,500
Final		640,000	59,065,000	534,000	1,072,000	22,000	1,350,000	6,362,500

== Polls ==
Fieldwork date	Polling firm	Dronov	Yefimova	Chursinov	Shvabovich	Zakharov	None	Lead
14 September 2025	2025 election	62.2	14.4	9.5	6.0	5.3	2.6	47.8
5–19 August 2025	WCIOM	64.9	16.2	8.9	4.3	3.2	2.5	48.7

== Results ==
Summary of the 12–14 September 2025 Novgorod Oblast gubernatorial election results
Candidate	Party	Votes	%
Aleksandr Dronov (incumbent)	United Russia	109,606	62.19
Olga Yefimova	Communist Party	25,387	14.40
Aleksey Chursinov	Liberal Democratic Party	16,804	9.53
Nikolay Shvabovich	A Just Russia – For Truth	10,648	6.04
Nikolay Zakharov	Party of Pensioners	9,288	5.27
Valid votes		171,733	97.44
Blank ballots		4,512	2.56
Total		176,245	100.00
Turnout		176,245	37.70
Registered voters		467,509	100.00

Governor Dronov appointed former Minister of Transport of Russia Yevgeny Dietrich (United Russia) to the Federation Council, replacing incumbent Senator Sergey Mitin (United Russia).

== See also ==
- 2025 Russian regional elections
