= 2022 Novgorod Oblast gubernatorial election =

← 2017	9–11 September 2022	2025 →
- Turnout: 32.79%
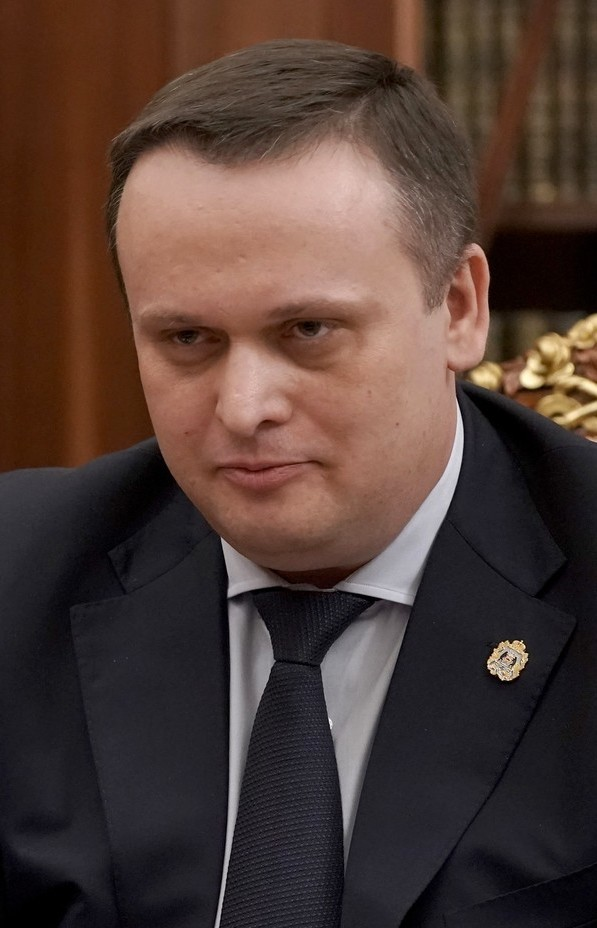
		CPRF
Nominee	Andrey Nikitin	Olga Yefimova
Party	United Russia	CPRF
Popular vote	120,539	17,211
Percentage	77.03%	10.99%
Governor before election
Andrey Nikitin
United Russia
Elected Governor
Andrey Nikitin
United Russia

The 2022 Novgorod Oblast gubernatorial election took place on 9–11 September 2022, on common election day. Incumbent Governor Andrey Nikitin was re-elected for a second term.

== Background ==
ASI general director Andrey Nikitin was appointed Governor of Novgorod Oblast in February 2017, replacing two-term Governor Sergey Mitin. Nikitin won the following election with 67.99% of the vote. Nikitin's first term wasn't marked by major accomplishments, however, he was constantly rumoured as a potential candidate for position in the Federal Government.

Due to the start of the Russian invasion of Ukraine in February 2022 and subsequent economic sanctions, the cancellation and postponement of direct gubernatorial elections was proposed. The measure was even supported by A Just Russia leader Sergey Mironov. Eventually, on 10 June Novgorod Oblast Duma called the gubernatorial election for 11 September 2022.

== Candidates ==
Only political parties can nominate candidates for gubernatorial election in Novgorod Oblast, self-nomination is not possible. However, candidates are not obliged to be members of the nominating party. Candidate for Governor of Novgorod Oblast should be a Russian citizen and at least 30 years old. Each candidate in order to be registered is required to collect at least 10% of signatures of members and heads of municipalities. Also, gubernatorial candidates present three candidacies to the Federation Council and election winner later appoints one of the presented candidates.

=== Registered ===
- Aleksey Chursinov (LDPR), Member of Novgorod Oblast Duma
- Andrey Nikitin (United Russia), incumbent Governor of Novgorod Oblast
- Aleksey Prokopov (RPPSS), Member of Novgorod Oblast Duma, jurist
- Sergey Shrub (SR-ZP), Member of Veliky Novgorod Duma
- Olga Yefimova (CPRF), former Member of Novgorod Oblast Duma (2006-2011, 2016–2021), 2003, 2012 and 2017 gubernatorial candidate

=== Failed to qualify ===
- Anna Cherepanova (Yabloko), Member of Veliky Novgorod Duma, 2017 gubernatorial candidate

=== Eliminated in primary ===
- Aleksandr Rozbaum (United Russia), Head of Starorussky District
- Olga Zakharova (United Russia), Member of Novgorod Oblast Duma, cardiologist

== Finances ==
All sums are in rubles.

Financial Report	Source	Cherepanova	Chursinov	Nikitin	Prokopov	Shrub	Yefimova
First		55,000	500,000	10,000,000	9,905,000	160,000	312,400
Final		155,000	2,000,000	60,000,000	11,905,000	510,000	1,437,400

== Results ==
Summary of the 9–11 September 2022 Novgorod Oblast gubernatorial election results
Candidate	Party	Votes	%
Andrey Nikitin (incumbent)	United Russia	120,539	77.03
Olga Yefimova	Communist Party	17,211	10.99
Aleksey Chursinov	Liberal Democratic Party	6,929	4.43
Aleksey Prokopov	Party of Pensioners	4,008	2.56
Sergey Shrub	A Just Russia — For Truth	3,907	2.50
Valid votes		152,594	97.52
Blank ballots		3,880	2.48
Total		156,474	100.00
Turnout		156,474	32.79
Registered voters		477,158	100.00

Incumbent Senator Sergey Mitin (United Russia) was re-appointed to the Federation Council.

== See also ==
- 2022 Russian gubernatorial elections
