= 2017 Novgorod Oblast gubernatorial election =

← 2012	10 September 2017	2022 →
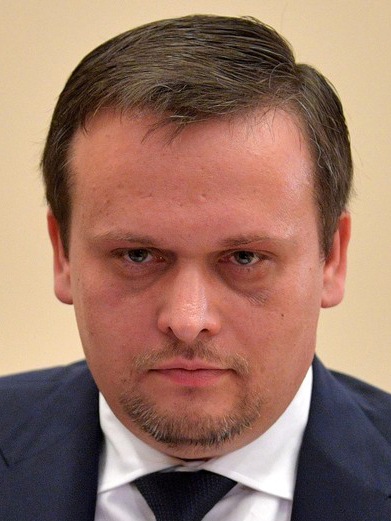
		CPRF	LDPR
Nominee	Andrey Nikitin	Olga Yefimova	Anton Morozov
Party	United Russia	CPRF	LDPR
Popular vote	97,405	23,167	10,765
Percentage	67.99%	16.17%	7.51%
- 2017 Novgorod Oblast gubernatorial election results by municipality
Acting Governor before election
Andrey Nikitin
United Russia
Elected Governor
Andrey Nikitin
United Russia

Gubernatorial Election in Novgorod Oblast were held on 10 September 2017.

== Background ==
13 February 2017 Governor Sergey Mitin announced early resignation and that he will not nominate his candidacy for a new term. Acting Governor appointed Andrey Nikitin.

== Candidates ==
Candidates on the ballot:

Candidate	Party	Office
Olga Yefimova; Born 1970 (age 47)	Communist Party	Member of the Novgorod Oblast Duma
Nikolay Zakharov; Born 1954 (age 63)	Patriots of Russia	Head of Department, Chief state engineer-inspector of State Technical Supervision of the Novgorod Oblast
Anton Morozov; Born 1972 (age 45)	Liberal Democratic Party	Member of the State Duma
Andrey Nikitin; Born 1979 (age 37)	United Russia	Incumbent acting Governor
Mikhail Panov; Born 1964 (age 52)	A Just Russia	Deputy Director of "Prisma"

== Opinion polls ==
Date	Poll source	Nikitin	Yefimova	Morozov	Panov	Zakharov	Undecided	Abstention	Spoil the Ballot
10–21 August 2017	FOM	50%	5%	3%	2%	1%	20%	17%	2%
24 July–4 August 2017	APEK	53.7%	7.9%	3.8%	2.0%	1.3%	22.3%	7.4%	1.6%

== Result ==
Candidate	Party	Votes	%
Andrey Nikitin	United Russia	97,405	67.99%
Olga Yefimova	Communist Party	23,167	16.17%
Anton Morozov	Liberal Democratic Party	10,765	7.51%
Mikhail Panov	A Just Russia	5,859	4.09%
Nikolay Zakharov	Patriots of Russia	2,450	1.71%
Invalid ballots		3,618	2.53%
Total		143,264	100%

== See also ==
- 2017 Russian gubernatorial elections
