= 2026 Novgorod Oblast legislative election =

Regional legislative election in Russia

- 18–20 September 2026

All 32 seats in the Oblast Duma 17 seats needed for a majority
- Turnout: 43.80% ▲3.54 pp
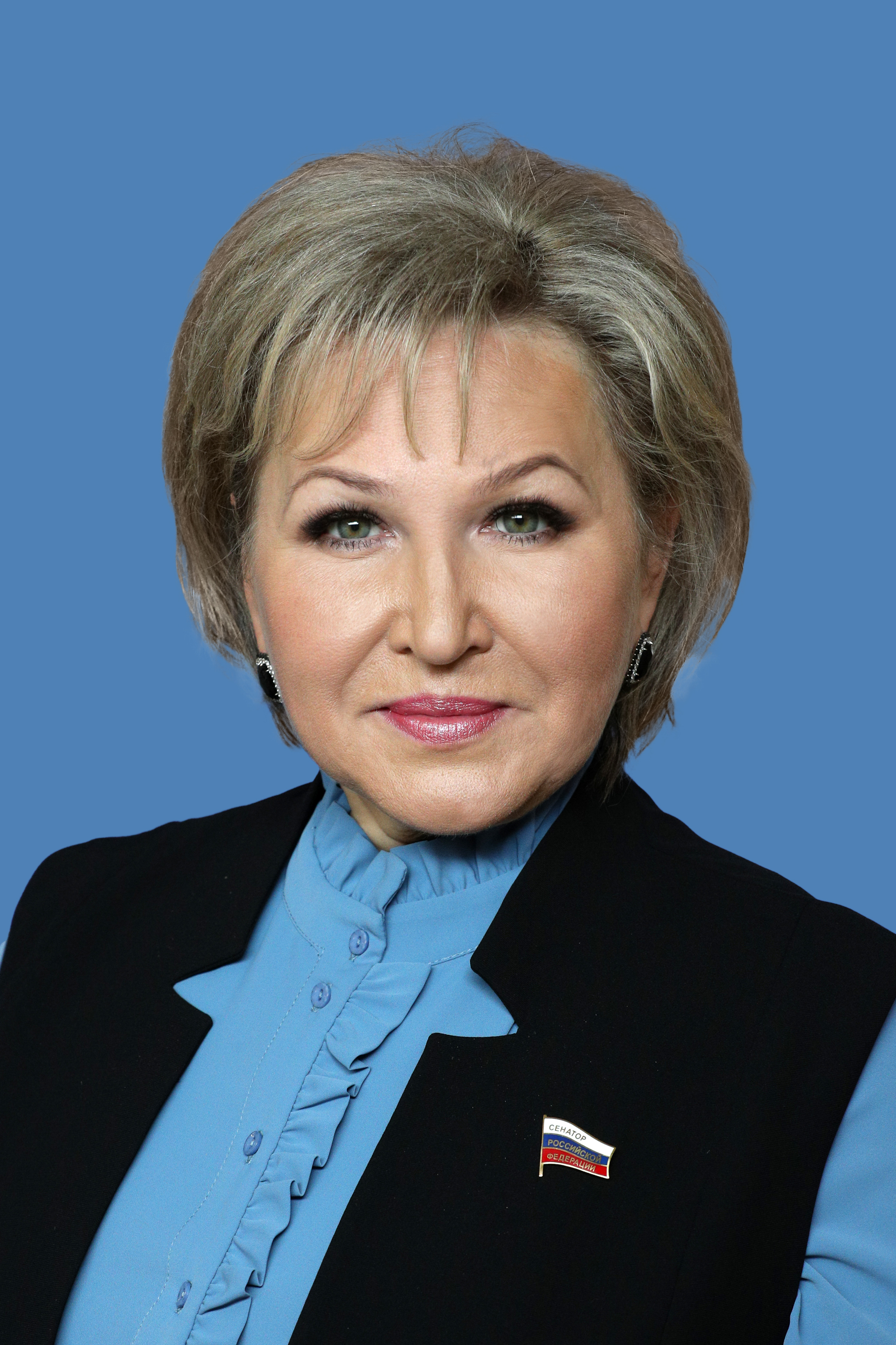

	Majority party	Minority party	Third party
		CPRF	LDPR
Candidate	Elena Pisareva	Olga Yefimova	Nikolay Bezverkhov
Party	United Russia	CPRF	LDPR
Last election	29.46%, 23 seats	19.81%, 2 seats	8.99%, 1 seat (Note: Aleksey Chursinov, the sole party faction member, left the party in June 2026)
Seats won	26	1	1
Seat change	▲3	▼1	Steady
Popular vote	77,643	29,731	24,318
Percentage	38.12%	14.60%	11.94%
Swing	▲8.66 pp	▼5.21 pp	▲2.95 pp
	Fourth party	Fifth party	Sixth party
	NL		Yabloko
Candidate	Ilya Prikhodko	Nikolay Shvabovich	Yelena Tulina
Party	New People	A Just Russia	Yabloko
Last election	8.37%, 1 seat	15.76%, 3 seats	3.83%, 0 seats
Seats won	1	1	1
Seat change	Steady	▼2	▲1
Popular vote	20,237	15,720	12,986
Percentage	9.94%	7.72%	6.38%
Swing	▲1.57 pp	▼8.04 pp	▲2.55 pp
	Seventh party	Eighth party
	RPPSS	CPCR
Candidate	Nikolay Zakharov	Igor Averkin
Party	Party of Pensioners	Communists of Russia
Last election	5.80%, 1 seat	3.28%, 0 seats
Seats won	1	0
Seat change	Steady	Steady
Popular vote	11,287	6,722
Percentage	5.54%	3.30%
Swing	▼0.26 pp	▲0.02 pp
Chairman before election
Yury Bobryshev
United Russia
Elected Chairman
Yury Bobryshev
United Russia
Senator before election
Elena Pisareva
United Russia
Senator after election
Elena Pisareva
United Russia

The 2026 Novgorod Oblast Duma election took place on 18–20 September 2026, on common election day, coinciding with the 2026 Russian legislative election. All 32 seats in the Oblast Duma were up for re-election.

United Russia increased its overwhelming majority in the Oblast Duma, winning 38.1% of the vote and all 20 single-mandate constituencies. Communist Party of the Russian Federation lost one of its two seats, while A Just Russia was reduced to one-member faction. Yabloko entered the Oblast Duma for the first time, winning 6.4% of the vote and a single party-list seat.

== Electoral system ==
Under current election laws, the Oblast Duma is elected for a term of five years, with parallel voting. 12 seats are elected by party-list proportional representation with a 5% electoral threshold, with the other part elected in 20 single-member constituencies by first-past-the-post voting. Seats in the proportional part are allocated using the Imperiali quota, modified to ensure that every party list, which passes the threshold, receives at least one mandate. Unlike most regional elections in Russia, party lists in Novgorod Oblast do not have an oblast-wide list.

== Candidates ==
=== Party lists ===
To register regional lists of candidates, parties need to collect 0.5% of signatures of all registered voters in Novgorod Oblast.

The following parties were relieved from the necessity to collect signatures:

- United Russia
- Communist Party of the Russian Federation
- Liberal Democratic Party of Russia
- A Just Russia
- New People
- Russian Party of Pensioners for Social Justice
- Communists of Russia
- Yabloko

№	Party	Territorial groups leaders	Candidates	Territorial groups	Status
1	Liberal Democratic Party	Nikolay Bezverkhov • Denis Fyodorov • Vitaly Vasilyev Anzhelika Burova • Zinaida Petrunova • Eva Tonkikh • Aleksandr Khamitsky • Kristina Uglenko • Sergey Antonov • Igor Chizhukhin	30	10	Registered
2	Communists of Russia	~~Soslan Bulatsev~~ • Igor Averkin • Vladimir Dmitriyev • Atsamaz Baskayev • Yevgeny Titov • Aslan Tsalikov • Ilya Skoba • Semyon Orlov • Aleksey Konstantinov • Nino Margiyeva	20	10	Registered
3	Yabloko	Yegor Kravtsov • Valentina Guchinskaya • Nadezhda Chindina • Maria Zakharova • Yelena Tulina • Anna Varnakova • Valery Kochnev • Andrey Shuvalov • Eduard Sikov • ~~Anna Cherepanova~~	19	10	Registered
4	United Russia	Yury Bobryshev • Irina Semyonova • Vasily Yan • Yury Borovikov • Ivan Bombin • Igor Avdeyev • Olga Zakharova • Elena Pisareva • Andrey Pavlov • Nina Boyakova	30	10	Registered
5	Communist Party	Igor Kovalev • Valery Glazunov • Igor Skopintsev • Olga Yefimova • Liliana Kostrikova • Marina Isayeva • Larisa Savina • Svetlana Volkova • Yekaterina Abbasova • Aleksey Starostin	30	10	Registered
6	A Just Russia	Ilya Kostusenko • Nadezhda Pelgemainen • Anatoly Gerchiu • Aleksandr Kashitsyn • Dmitry Blagodyorov • Alla Khoroshevskaya • Nikolay Shvabovich • Yury Lebedev • Sergey Rossiysky • Aleksey Stepanov	29	10	Registered
7	New People	Arina Prokofyeva • Andrey Bogdanov • Yevgeny Ivanov • Artur Gapizov • Valery Shebotinov • Stepan Dorokhov • Ilya Prikhodko • Svetlana Vikhrova • Yevgenia Lukavetskaya • Igor Skobarev	28	10	Registered
8	Party of Pensioners	Sergey Zubarev • Svetlana Zimneva • Sergey Kuznetsov • Marina Goncharova • Olga Krushinina • Yevgeny Petrov • Vera Fyodorova • Maria Gamayunova • Vladimir Shitikov • Nikolay Zakharov	23	10	Registered
	Rodina	Anton Rozhkov • Gennady Shmakov • Denis Petrozhitsky • Artyom Ursegov • Aleksey Adyrov • Dmitry Lukashev • Natalia Beloglazova	7	7	Did not file

Green Alternative, which participated in the last election, was dissolved and merged into Russian Ecological Party "The Greens".

=== Single-mandate constituencies ===
20 single-mandate constituencies were formed in Novgorod Oblast. To register candidates in single-mandate constituencies need to collect 3% of signatures of registered voters in the constituency.

Number of candidates in single-mandate constituencies
Party	Candidates	
Party	Nominated	Registered
United Russia	20	20
Communist Party	20	20
A Just Russia	20	20
Liberal Democratic Party	20	19
New People	19	19
Party of Pensioners	20	20
Yabloko	11	11
Communists of Russia	16	16
Independent	2	0
Total	150	147

== Results ==
=== Results by party lists ===
Summary of the 18–20 September 2026 Novgorod Oblast Duma election results
Party	Party list					Constituency		Total	
Party	Votes	%	±pp	Seats	+/–	Seats	+/–	Seats	+/–
United Russia	77,643	38.12	▲8.66	6	▲1	20	▲2	26	▲3
Communist Party	29,731	14.60	▼5.21	1	▼1	0	Steady	1	▼1
Liberal Democratic Party	24,318	11.94	▲2.95	1	Steady	0	Steady	1	Steady
New People	20,237	9.94	▲1.57	1	Steady	0	Steady	1	Steady
A Just Russia	15,720	7.72	▼8.04	1	▼1	0	▼1	1	▼2
Yabloko	12,986	6.38	▲2.55	1	▲1	0	Steady	1	▲1
Party of Pensioners	11,287	5.54	▼0.26	1	Steady	0	Steady	1	Steady
Communists of Russia	6,722	3.30	▲0.02	0	Steady	0	Steady	0	Steady
Independent	—	—	—	—	—	0	▼1	0	▼1
Invalid ballots	5,045	2.48	▼0.69	—	—	—	—	—	—
Total	203,689	100.00	—	12	Steady	20	Steady	32	Steady
Turnout	203,689	43.80	▲3.54	—	—	—	—	—	—
Registered voters	466,124	100.00	—	—	—	—	—	—	—

Yury Bobryshev (United Russia) was re-elected as Chairman of the Oblast Duma, while incumbent Senator Elena Pisareva (United Russia) was re-appointed to the Federation Council.

=== Results in single-member constituencies ===
==== District 1 ====
Summary of the 18–20 September 2026 Novgorod Oblast Duma election in Soletsky constituency No.1
Candidate	Party	Votes	%
Anatoly Sevostyanov (incumbent)	United Russia	4,909	43.49%
Yekaterina Abbasova	Communist Party	1,841	16.31%
Nikolay Bezverkhov	Liberal Democratic Party	1,063	9.42%
Svetlana Vikhrova	New People	907	8.04%
Olga Abakumova	Communists of Russia	810	7.18%
Vladimir Kolesov	A Just Russia	809	7.17%
Svetlana Pynnonen	Party of Pensioners	568	5.03%
Total		11,288	100%

==== District 2 ====
Summary of the 18–20 September 2026 Novgorod Oblast Duma election in Starorussky constituency No.2
Candidate	Party	Votes	%
Roman Vlasov	United Russia	6,353	51.92%
Dmitry Blagodyorov	A Just Russia	1,795	14.67%
Boris Morozov	Liberal Democratic Party	942	7.70%
Vladimir Skorin	Communist Party	893	7.30%
Ivan Astakhov	Communists of Russia	728	5.95%
Aleksandr Kozyrev	New People	700	5.72%
Sergey Kuznetsov	Party of Pensioners	524	4.28%
Total		12,235	100%

==== District 3 ====
Summary of the 18–20 September 2026 Novgorod Oblast Duma election in Parfinsky constituency No.3
Candidate	Party	Votes	%
Olga Borisova (incumbent)	United Russia	5,139	46.76%
Ilya Orlov	Communist Party	1,967	17.90%
Lyudmila Buravtsova	A Just Russia	1,354	12.32%
Ivan Khudyakov	New People	1,220	11.10%
Zinaida Petrunova	Liberal Democratic Party	605	5.51%
Lyudmila Sokolova	Party of Pensioners	362	3.29%
Total		10,989	100%

==== District 4 ====
Summary of the 18–20 September 2026 Novgorod Oblast Duma election in Yermolinsky constituency No.4
Candidate	Party	Votes	%
Larisa Sergukhina (incumbent)	United Russia	2,839	30.59%
Aleksandr Moshnikov	Communist Party	1,501	16.17%
Polina Zaytseva	New People	1,288	13.88%
Yelena Tulina	Yabloko	957	10.31%
Yekaterina Skobeleva	Liberal Democratic Party	909	9.79%
Nadezhda Pelgemainen	A Just Russia	823	8.87%
Maria Dunicheva	Party of Pensioners	672	7.24%
Total		9,281	100%

==== District 5 ====
Summary of the 18–20 September 2026 Novgorod Oblast Duma election in Pskovsky constituency No.5
Candidate	Party	Votes	%
Mikhail Karaulov (incumbent)	United Russia	3,927	36.33%
Aleksey Starostin	Communist Party	1,723	15.94%
Andrey Shuvalov	Yabloko	1,208	11.18%
Alla Khoroshevskaya	A Just Russia	1,164	10.77%
Mikhail Sokhanchak	New People	1,072	9.92%
Igor Chizhukhin	Liberal Democratic Party	842	7.79%
Larisa Ryzhenkova	Party of Pensioners	632	5.85%
Total		10,809	100%

==== District 6 ====
Summary of the 18–20 September 2026 Novgorod Oblast Duma election in Pankovsky constituency No.6
Candidate	Party	Votes	%
Nikolay Veriga (incumbent)	United Russia	3,389	35.87%
Valery Glazunov	Communist Party	1,121	11.87%
Olga Stroh	New People	1,098	11.62%
Lilia Boroday	Yabloko	991	10.49%
Vladimir Bulin	Liberal Democratic Party	910	9.63%
Yevgeny Sharygin	A Just Russia	657	6.95%
Svetlana Zimneva	Party of Pensioners	641	6.79%
Galina Manurikova	Communists of Russia	395	4.18%
Total		9,447	100%

==== District 7 ====
Summary of the 18–20 September 2026 Novgorod Oblast Duma election in Kochetovsky constituency No.7
Candidate	Party	Votes	%
Stanislav Melnikov (incumbent)	United Russia	3,507	35.50%
Yevgeny Ivanov	New People	1,154	11.68%
Aleksey Khristenko	Communist Party	995	10.07%
Anton Lobach	A Just Russia	980	9.92%
Aleksandr Posrednikov	Yabloko	954	9.66%
Aleksandr Semyonov	Liberal Democratic Party	808	8.18%
Vladimir Shitikov	Party of Pensioners	641	6.49%
Mikhail Ignatov	Communists of Russia	579	5.86%
Total		9,880	100%

==== District 8 ====
Summary of the 18–20 September 2026 Novgorod Oblast Duma election in Western constituency No.8
Candidate	Party	Votes	%
Anatoly Fedotov (incumbent)	United Russia	3,968	37.24%
Vitaly Vasilyev	Liberal Democratic Party	1,307	12.27%
Igor Kovalev	Communist Party	1,261	11.84%
Valery Kochnev	Yabloko	1,119	10.50%
Lyudmila Ivegesh	New People	898	8.43%
Ilya Kostusenko	A Just Russia	867	8.14%
Yekaterina Denisova	Party of Pensioners	541	5.08%
Arina Maslyakova	Communists of Russia	427	4.01%
Total		10,654	100%

==== District 9 ====
Summary of the 18–20 September 2026 Novgorod Oblast Duma election in Sankt-Peterburgsky constituency No.9
Candidate	Party	Votes	%
Andrey Yefremenkov	United Russia	2,549	28.70%
Ilya Prikhodko	New People	1,372	15.45%
Anzhelika Burova	Liberal Democratic Party	1,102	12.41%
Igor Skopintsev	Communist Party	998	11.24%
Yulia Kashirina	A Just Russia	936	10.54%
Viktor Shalyakin	Yabloko	899	10.12%
Sergey Semyonov	Party of Pensioners	464	5.22%
Aleksandr Grunin	Communists of Russia	358	4.03%
Total		8,882	100%

==== District 10 ====
Summary of the 18–20 September 2026 Novgorod Oblast Duma election in Moskovsky constituency No.10
Candidate	Party	Votes	%
Yekaterina Aleksandrova	United Russia	4,294	35.68%
Olga Batayeva	Communist Party	1,518	12.61%
Sergey Shrub	A Just Russia	1,500	12.46%
Aleksey Yegoshin	New People	1,383	11.49%
Artyom Prishva	Yabloko	1,189	9.88%
Aleksandr Khamitsky	Liberal Democratic Party	847	7.04%
Nikolay Zakharov	Party of Pensioners	631	5.24%
Vladislav Bazylnikov	Communists of Russia	399	3.32%
Total		12,035	100%

==== District 11 ====
Summary of the 18–20 September 2026 Novgorod Oblast Duma election in Central constituency No.11
Candidate	Party	Votes	%
Valery Volnov	United Russia	3,360	33.22%
Yevgenia Lukavetskaya	New People	1,506	14.89%
Tatyana Kintsel	Communist Party	1,502	14.85%
Nikolay Shvabovich	A Just Russia	1,443	14.27%
Vyacheslav Belorusov	Liberal Democratic Party	994	9.83%
Sergey Zubarev	Party of Pensioners	587	5.80%
Nikita Shvaryov	Communists of Russia	397	3.93%
Total		10,114	100%

==== District 12 ====
Summary of the 18–20 September 2026 Novgorod Oblast Duma election in Chudovsky constituency No.12
Candidate	Party	Votes	%
Tatyana Shishlyanikova (incumbent)	United Russia	3,469	39.04%
Liliana Kostrikova	Communist Party	1,323	14.89%
Arina Mikhaylova	New People	870	9.79%
Yaroslav Skvortsov	A Just Russia	767	8.63%
Denis Fyodorov	Liberal Democratic Party	763	8.59%
Nikolay Glushenkov	Party of Pensioners	739	8.32%
Vyacheslav Zhuravlyov	Communists of Russia	601	6.76%
Total		8,885	100%

==== District 13 ====
Summary of the 18–20 September 2026 Novgorod Oblast Duma election in Malovishersky constituency No.13
Candidate	Party	Votes	%
Sergey Ivanov	United Russia	3,888	39.35%
Nikolay Karpov	Communist Party	1,406	14.23%
Arina Prokofyeva	New People	1,168	11.82%
Aleksey Stepanov	A Just Russia	838	8.48%
Yelena Kizyurina	Liberal Democratic Party	823	8.33%
Valery Petrov	Party of Pensioners	594	6.01%
Eduard Sikov	Yabloko	488	4.94%
Dmitry Yashin	Communists of Russia	354	3.58%
Total		9,881	100%

==== District 14 ====
Summary of the 18–20 September 2026 Novgorod Oblast Duma election in Okulovsky constituency No.14
Candidate	Party	Votes	%
Maksim Bombin (incumbent)	United Russia	2,946	33.16%
Marina Isayeva	Communist Party	1,548	17.42%
Sergey Antonov	Liberal Democratic Party	1,326	14.92%
Sergey Rossiysky	A Just Russia	1,137	12.80%
Marina Isayeva	Communists of Russia	801	9.02%
Vera Fyodorova	Party of Pensioners	738	8.31%
Total		8,885	100%

==== District 15 ====
Summary of the 18–20 September 2026 Novgorod Oblast Duma election in Krestetsky constituency No.15
Candidate	Party	Votes	%
Mikhail Galakhov	United Russia	3,531	37.43%
Roman Andreyev	A Just Russia	1,407	14.92%
Olga Yefimova	Communist Party	1,388	14.71%
Anastasia Ivanova	Liberal Democratic Party	810	8.59%
Irina Yefimova	Communists of Russia	778	8.25%
Artur Gapizov	New People	674	7.15%
Maria Yefremova	Party of Pensioners	504	5.34%
Total		9,433	100%

==== District 16 ====
Summary of the 18–20 September 2026 Novgorod Oblast Duma election in Valdaysky constituency No.16
Candidate	Party	Votes	%
Vladimir Korolyov (incumbent)	United Russia	4,598	41.79%
Stepan Dorokhov	New People	1,739	15.81%
Denis Popadeykin	Communist Party	1,299	11.81%
Olga Krushinina	Party of Pensioners	1,120	10.18%
Dmitry Kryukov	A Just Russia	1,087	9.88%
Konstantin Avgustov	Communists of Russia	809	7.35%
Total		11,002	100%

==== District 17 ====
Summary of the 18–20 September 2026 Novgorod Oblast Duma election in Lyubytinsky constituency No.17
Candidate	Party	Votes	%
Yury Salamonov (incumbent)	United Russia	3,448	40.06%
Natalya Shapovalova	Communist Party	1,336	15.52%
Svetlana Alekseyeva	A Just Russia	988	11.48%
Denis Baglin	Liberal Democratic Party	873	10.14%
Zhasmin Petrosyan	New People	590	6.85%
Olga Nikitina	Yabloko	495	5.75%
Maksim Toropygin	Party of Pensioners	332	3.86%
Andrey Yakimov	Communists of Russia	287	3.33%
Total		8,608	100%

==== District 18 ====
Summary of the 18–20 September 2026 Novgorod Oblast Duma election in Borovichsky city constituency No.18
Candidate	Party	Votes	%
Oleg Strygin	United Russia	3,239	42.19%
Mikhail Gusev	Communist Party	1,095	14.26%
Anatoly Gerchiu	A Just Russia	734	9.56%
Dmitry Volkov	New People	733	9.55%
Nadezhda Chindina	Yabloko	629	8.19%
Kristina Uglenko	Liberal Democratic Party	619	8.06%
Aleksandr Gvardin	Party of Pensioners	420	5.47%
Total		7,678	100%

==== District 19 ====
Summary of the 18–20 September 2026 Novgorod Oblast Duma election in Borovichsky constituency No.19
Candidate	Party	Votes	%
Larisa Artemyeva (incumbent)	United Russia	4,222	44.75%
Svetlana Volkova	Communist Party	1,264	13.40%
Andrey Semyonov	New People	898	9.52%
Tatyana Konovalova	Liberal Democratic Party	729	7.73%
Yury Lebedev	A Just Russia	636	6.74%
Yury Bykov	Party of Pensioners	549	5.82%
Aleksandr Bolshakov	Yabloko	473	5.01%
Vladislav Karmanov	Communists of Russia	367	3.89%
Total		9,435	100%

==== District 20 ====
Summary of the 18–20 September 2026 Novgorod Oblast Duma election in Pestovsky constituency No.20
Candidate	Party	Votes	%
Aleksandr Fedorovsky (incumbent)	United Russia	4,367	40.89%
Igor Skobarev	New People	1,788	16.74%
Olga Vasilyeva	Communist Party	1,571	14.71%
Eva Tonkikh	Liberal Democratic Party	659	6.17%
Anna Varnakova	Yabloko	643	6.02%
Ksenia Gavrilova	A Just Russia	509	4.77%
Artyom Timofeyev	Communists of Russia	419	3.92%
Lyubov Kokkone	Party of Pensioners	402	3.76%
Total		10,681	100%

=== Members ===
Incumbent deputies are highlighted with bold, elected members who declined to take a seat are marked with ~~strikethrough~~.

Constituency
No.	Member	Party
1	Anatoly Sevostyanov	United Russia
2	Roman Vlasov	United Russia
3	Olga Borisova	United Russia
4	Larisa Sergukhina	United Russia
5	Mikhail Karaulov	United Russia
6	Nikolay Veriga	United Russia
7	Stanislav Melnikov	United Russia
8	Anatoly Fedotov	United Russia
9	Andrey Yefremenkov	United Russia
10	Yekaterina Aleksandrova	United Russia
11	Valery Volnov	United Russia
12	Tatyana Shishlyanikova	United Russia
13	Sergey Ivanov	United Russia
14	Maksim Bombin	United Russia
15	Mikhail Galakhov	United Russia
16	Vladimir Korolyov	United Russia
17	Yury Salamonov	United Russia
18	Oleg Strygin	United Russia
19	Larisa Artemyeva	United Russia
20	Aleksandr Fedorovsky	United Russia

Party lists
Member	Party
Yury Bobryshev	United Russia
Nina Boyakova	United Russia
Igor Avdeyev	United Russia
~~Ivan Bombin~~	United Russia
Olga Zakharova	United Russia
Elena Pisareva	United Russia
Vladimir Petrov	United Russia
Olga Yefimova	Communist Party
~~Denis Fyodorov~~	Liberal Democratic Party
~~Yelena Kizyurina~~	Liberal Democratic Party
~~Svetlana Antipova~~	Liberal Democratic Party
Nikolay Bezverkhov	Liberal Democratic Party
~~Valery Shebotinov~~	New People
~~Polina Zaytseva~~	New People
Ilya Prikhodko	New People
Nikolay Shvabovich	A Just Russia
Viktor Shalyakin	Yabloko
~~Olga Krushinina~~	Party of Pensioners
Nikolay Zakharov	Party of Pensioners

== See also ==
- 2026 Russian regional elections
