= Governor of Novgorod Oblast =

Highest-ranking official in Novgorod Oblast, Russia

- Coat of arms of Novgorod Oblast

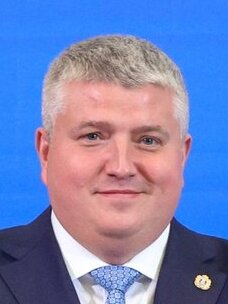
- Incumbent; Aleksandr Dronov since 14 October 2025
- Seat: Veliky Novgorod
- Term length: 5 years
- Constituting instrument: Charter of Novgorod Oblast, Section 5
- Formation: 1991
- Website: www.novreg.ru

The Governor of Novgorod Oblast (Russian: Губернатор Новгородской области) is the head of government of Novgorod Oblast, a federal subject of Russia.

The position was introduced in 1991 as Head of Administration of Novgorod Oblast. The Governor is elected by direct popular vote for a term of five years.

== List of officeholders ==
No.	Portrait	Governor	Tenure	Time in office	Party	Election
1		Mikhail Prusak (1960–2025)	24 October 1991 – 4 September 1999 (Note: Prusak announced his resignation one day before the snap gubernatorial election, in order to bypass term limits and neutralize opposition's legal efforts to postpone the voting.) (resigned)	7 years, 315 days	Independent → Our Home – Russia	Appointed 1995
—		Mikhail Skibar (1945–2023)	4 September 1999 – 10 September 1999 (successor took office)	6 days	Independent	Acting (Note: As first deputy governor.)
(1)		Mikhail Prusak (1960–2025)	10 September 1999 – 3 August 2007 (resigned)	7 years, 327 days	NDR → DPR → United Russia	1999; 2003
—		Sergey Mitin (born 1951)	3 August 2007 – 7 August 2007	9 years, 194 days	United Russia	Acting (Note: Appointed by the president of Russia.)
2		Sergey Mitin (born 1951)	7 August 2007 – 8 August 2012 (term end)	9 years, 194 days	United Russia	2007 (Note: Appointed by the president of Russia with the consent of the Novgorod Oblast Duma.)
—		Sergey Mitin (born 1951)	8 August 2012 – 20 October 2012	9 years, 194 days	United Russia	Acting
(2)		Sergey Mitin (born 1951)	20 October 2012 – 13 February 2017 (resigned)	9 years, 194 days	United Russia	2012
—		Andrey Nikitin (born 1979)	13 February 2017 – 14 October 2017	7 years, 360 days	United Russia	Acting
3		Andrey Nikitin (born 1979)	14 October 2017 – 7 February 2025 (resigned)	7 years, 360 days	United Russia	2017; 2022
—		Aleksandr Dronov (born 1979)	7 February 2025 – 5 March 2025 (reappointed)	1 year, 265 days	United Russia	Acting
—		Aleksandr Dronov (born 1979)	5 March 2025 – 14 October 2025	1 year, 265 days	United Russia	Acting
4		Aleksandr Dronov (born 1979)	14 October 2025 – present	1 year, 265 days	United Russia	2025
