= Novgorod Oblast Television =

Russian television channel

Novgorod Oblast Television (Russian: Новгородское областное телевидение) is a television channel in the area of Novgorod Oblast. The television channel set up in April 2004 and is registered as mass media since April 18, 2005.

== History ==
On December 20, 1991, by order of the Ministry of Press and Mass Media of the Russian Federation, the first Novgorod television and radio company “Slaviya” was established on the basis of the Television and Radio Broadcasting Committee of the Novgorod Regional Executive Committee. In 2004, it was reorganized into the autonomous non-profit organization “Novgorod Regional Television” (NOT), and in 2012 it became a regional state autonomous institution.

Novgorod Regional Television was created as part of the reform of state television, during which regional television and radio companies across Russia were transformed from subsidiaries — independent legal entities — into branches of VGTRK (All-Russia State Television and Radio Broadcasting Company), thus losing their legal and financial independence. Its founders include the administrations of Novgorod Oblast, Veliky Novgorod, and 21 municipal districts of the region. In 2009, NOT became the founder of the information and music radio station “Radio-53”, and in 2015, it became part of the media holding “Agency for Information Communications” (OGAУ “AIK”).

By the decision of the Federal Competition Commission for Television and Radio Broadcasting on February 15, 2017, the channel was designated as the mandatory publicly accessible regional TV channel (“Channel 21”) for Novgorod Oblast.

Since November 29, 2019, the programs of “Novgorod Regional Television” have been broadcast on OTR (Public Television of Russia) from 07:00 to 09:00 and from 18:00 to 19:00.

In 2022, the media holding “Agency for Information Communications” (OGAУ “AIK”) came under the leadership of Svetlana Fedotova, who replaced Sergey Bondarenko.

Starting from November 29, 2022, the broadcast time of “Novgorod Regional Television” on OTR was extended — from 06:00 to 09:00 and from 17:00 to 19:00.
