= Mikhail Prusak =

Russian politician (1960–2025)

- Михаил Прусак
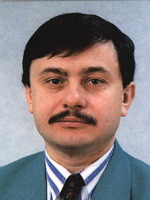

1st Governor of Novgorod Oblast
- In office 24 October 1991 – 3 August 2007
- Succeeded by: Sergey Mitin

Personal details
- Born: 23 February 1960 Dzhurkiv, Stanislav Oblast, Ukrainian SSR, USSR
- Died: 26 August 2025 (aged 65)
- Party: United Russia (2005–2025)
- Other political affiliations: CPSU (to August 1991), PRES (1993–1995), NDR (1995–2001), DPR (2001–2003)

Mikhail Mikhailovich Prusak (Russian: Михаил Михайлович Прусак; 23 February 1960 – 26 August 2025) was a Russian politician who was the governor of Novgorod Oblast, from 1991 to 2007.

== Life and career ==
Born and raised in Western Ukraine, in 1979 he graduated from the Kolomyia Pedagogical School. Then he worked for a year as a teacher of an extended day group in a rural school in Halych District. After graduating from the Higher Komsomol School he worked as the second and (since May 1987) the first secretary of Kholmsky District branch of Komsomol. From 1988 to 1991 he headed a sovkhoz.

He was a deputy of the 12th Supreme Soviet of the USSR and a member of the committee on self-government. Prusak was a member of the Inter-regional Deputies Group. He supported Boris Yeltsin's candidacy in the 1991 Russian presidential election. On 24 October 1991, Prusak was appointed head of Novgorod Oblast administration. In 1994, the regional law "On tax benefits for enterprises and organizations located in the region" was adopted, which allowed Prusak to attract more than $1.5 billion of foreign investments to Novgorod Oblast. In December 1995, he was elected as governor, gaining 56.17% of the vote. His re-election campaigns of 1999 and 2003 were seemed as "dominant", since there were not strong opposition. In December 1993 he was elected to the first Federation Council of Russia. After its reform in January 1996, Prusak continued his membership as governor. He was the chairman of the Federation Council's Committee on International Affairs. In 2001 he appointed Gennady Burbulis as member of the Council from the executive branch. In September 2001, Prusak became chairman of the Democratic Party of Russia, but after a year and a half he was expelled for "refusing to run the party."

On 3 August 2007 he resigned, and Sergey Mitin was appointed the governor. Month before Prusak was criticized by the presidential envoy to the Northwestern Federal District Ilya Klebanov, who stated that "the leaders of the criminal community have infiltrated all spheres of life in the region, including the government."

On 26 August 2025, it was announced that Prusak had died at the age of 65.
