= Anton Morozov =

Russian politician (born 1972)

- Антон Морозов
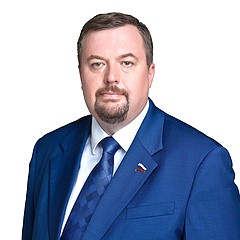

Member of the State Duma
- In office 6 April 2016 – 2021

Member of the Novgorod Oblast Duma
- In office 2006–2011

Personal details
- Born: Anton Yuryevich Morozov; 24 February 1972 (age 53); Moscow, Soviet Union
- Political party: Liberal Democratic Party of Russia

Anton Yuryevich Morozov (Russian: Антон Юрьевич Морозов; born 24 February 1972), is a Russian politician who has previously been a member of the State Duma from the Liberal Democratic Party of Russia (LDPR).

== Biography ==
Anton Morozov was born in Moscow on 24 February 1972.

In 1995, he graduated from the Faculty of Physics of Moscow State University. In 2005, he graduated from the Russian Academy of Public Administration under the President of Russia.

Morozov had been a member of the Novgorod Oblast Duma from 2006 to 2011

On 6 April 2016, Morozov became a member of the State Duma of the sixth convocation, as he received the mandate of Sergey Sirotkin, which had been vacant. He is a member of the International Affairs Committee.

On 18 September 2016, he was elected to the State Duma of the VII convocation on the federal list from the Liberal Democratic Party (No. 1 in the regional group No. 95, Novgorod Region, Tver Region).

He was a member of the Supreme Council of the LDPR, elected at the XXX Congress of the LDPR on 4 February 2017.
