= GTLK =

Russia's largest leasing company

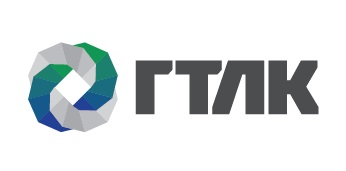
GTLK logo

GTLK (Russian: Государственная транспортная лизинговая компания, ГТЛК; English: State Transport Leasing Company) is Russia's largest leasing company. Its offices are in Salekhard, Yamalo-Nenets Autonomous Okrug, Russia.

In April 2022, GTLK was added to the British government's and EU sanctions lists, in relation to the 2022 Russian invasion of Ukraine. GTLK accounts were blocked, restrictions were placed on the export and import transactions of the company and its subsidiaries, and a ban on access to EU ports was introduced against the group of ships under the control of the group. As a result, GTLK received a record loss of 55.8 billion rubles in 2022.
