= Elena Pisareva =

Russian politician

- Елена Писарева
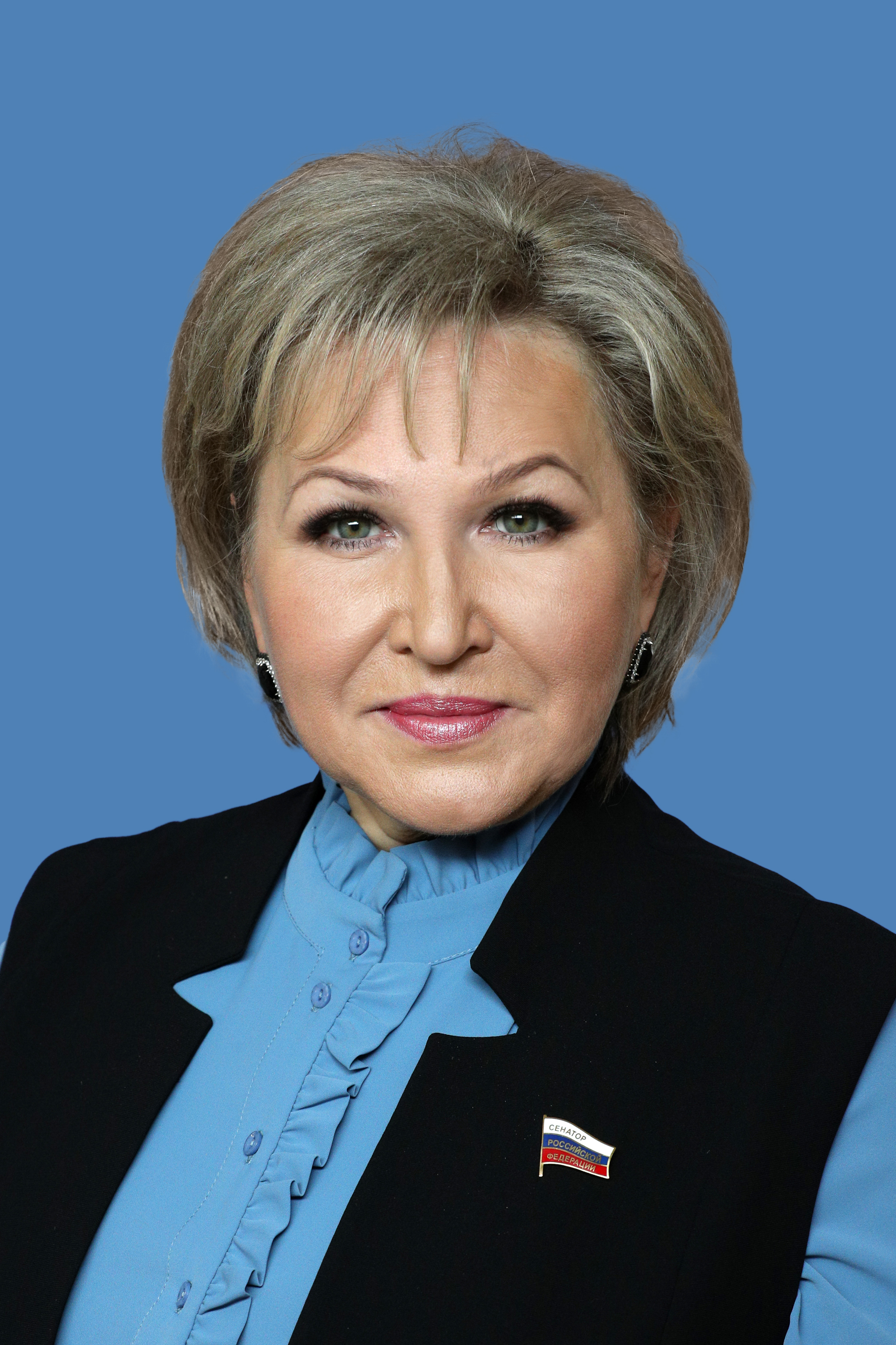

Senator from Novgorod Oblast
- Incumbent
- Assumed office 6 October 2021
- Preceded by: Sergey Fabrichny

Personal details
- Born: 20 January 1967 (age 59) Veliky Novgorod, Russian SFSR, Soviet Union
- Party: United Russia
- Education: Yaroslav-the-Wise Novgorod State University

Elena Vladimirovna Pisareva (Russian: Елена Владимировна Писарева; born 20 January 1967) is a Russian politician serving as a senator from Novgorod Oblast since 6 October 2021.

== Biography ==
Elena Pisareva was born on 20 January 1967 in Veliky Novgorod. In 1998, she graduated from the Yaroslav-the-Wise Novgorod State University. From 1986 to 1999, she worked as a daycare teacher and elementary school teacher. In 2001, she became the deputy director, Director of the Municipal Institution "Center for Social Assistance to Families and Children". From 2006 to 2021, she was the deputy of the Novgorod Oblast Duma. On 6 October 2021, she became a senator after being nominated by deputies of the Novgorod Oblast Duma.

== Sanctions ==
Elena Pisareva was sanctioned by the European Union, the United Kingdom, the United States, and other states, for supporting Russia's annexation of Ukrainian territories.
