= Aleksandr Dronov (politician) =

Russian politician (born 1979)

- Александр Дронов
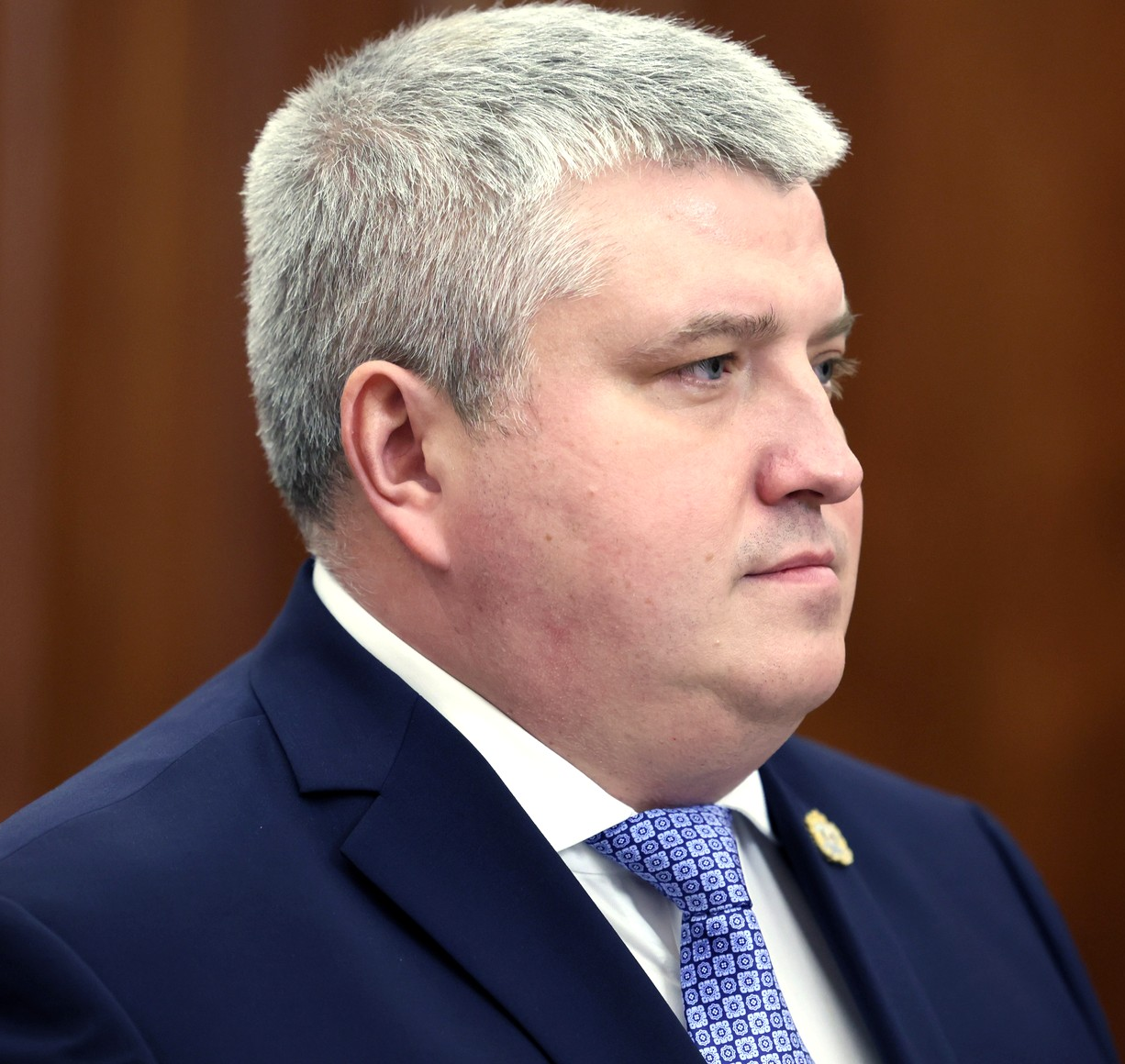
- Dronov in March 2025

Governor of Novgorod Oblast
- Incumbent
- Assumed office 14 October 2025; Acting: 7 February 2025 – 14 October 2025
- Preceded by: Andrey Nikitin

First Deputy Governor of Novgorod Oblast
- In office 15 January 2020 – 7 February 2025
- Preceded by: Sergey Sorokin

Personal details
- Born: Aleksandr Valetinovich Dronov; 5 July 1979 (age 46) Mozdok, Russian SFSR, Soviet Union
- Party: United Russia

Aleksandr Valentinovich Dronov (Russian: Александр Валентинович Дронов; born 5 July 1979), is a Russian politician who is currently the Governor of Novgorod Oblast since 14 October 2025. He was the First Deputy Governor of Novgorod Oblast from 2020 to 2025.

== Biography ==
Aleksandr Dronov was born on 5 July 1979 in Mozdok. In 2002, he graduated from the Moscow Road State Technical University. He worked in the system of the Federal Road Agency (FDA), structures of the Moscow Government, as well as regional and federal road management bodies. In 2006, he graduated from the Presidential Academy (formerly RANEPA, ANCH).

In April 2017 Dronov moved from the post of the Federal Road Agency's Acting Director of the Interregional Directorate for Road Construction in the Central Region of Russia to work in the government of Novgorod Oblast. On 6 June 2017, he became Deputy Governor of Novgorod Oblast, holding that position until 31 December 2017. On 1 January 2018, he was promoted to deputy governor and Deputy Chairman of the Government of Novgorod Oblast. On 15 January 2020, he was appointed first deputy governor of Novgorod Oblast.

On 7 February 2025, Dronov was appointed the acting governor of Novgorod Oblast, after Andrey Nikitin was appointed a deputy minister of transport.

== Personal life ==
Dronov is married.
