= Agency for Strategic Initiatives =

Russian autonomous non-profit organization

The Agency for Strategic Initiatives or ASI is a Russian autonomous non-profit organization founded by the Government of Russia. The agency aims to implement a set of measures in the economic and social spheres. In particular, for the promotion of priority projects, the implementation of measures to improve the business environment in Russia, the development of professional personnel, etc. Chairman of the supervisory board is Vladimir Putin. Since July 27, 2011, the Director General of the Agency was Andrei Nikitin. On February 13, 2017, by the decree of the President of Russia, he was appointed Acting Director of the Novgorod Region. From February 13, Svetlana Chupsheva became the Agency's Director General from the time she graduated from the Institute until she joined ASI, who had worked in the business structures of the Samara Region for 11 years. ASI office is located in Moscow, in the building of the Moscow Government on Novy Arbat Avenue.

== Activities of the Agency ==
The ASI has been established to coordinate the interaction with financial organizations, development institutions, and funds. It also attempt to coordinate interaction with authorities on the provision of support measures, assistance in solving systemic problems (various regulatory and administrative barriers.

The agency declares support for projects in several areas:

- New business
- Young professionals
- Social projects
