= Novgorod Oblast =

First-level administrative division of Russia

Novgorod Oblast Новгородская область (Russian)
- Oblast
- Flag Coat of arms

- Coordinates: 58°26′N 32°23′E
- Country: Russia
- Federal district: Northwestern
- Economic region: Northwestern
- Established: July 5, 1944
- Administrative center: Veliky Novgorod

Government
  - Body: Oblast Duma
  - Governor: Aleksandr Dronov

Area
  - Total: 54,501 km^{2} (21,043 sq mi)
  - Rank: 48th

Population (2021 census)
  - Total: 583,387
  - Estimate (2018): 606,476
  - Rank: 67th
  - Density: 10.704/km^{2} (27.724/sq mi)
  - Urban: 73.0%
  - Rural: 27.0%

GDP (nominal, 2024)
  - Total: ₽409 billion (US$4.8 billion)
  - Per capita: ₽712,877 (US$8,365.04)
- Time zone: UTC+3 (MSK)
- ISO 3166 code: RU-NGR
- License plates: 53
- OKTMO ID: 49000000
- Official languages: Russian
- Website: www.novreg.ru

Novgorod Oblast (Russian: Новгоро́дская о́бласть, romanized: Novgorodskaya oblastʹ) is a federal subject of Russia (an oblast). Its administrative center is the city of Veliky Novgorod. Some of the oldest Russian cities, including Veliky Novgorod and Staraya Russa, are located in the oblast. The historic monuments of Veliky Novgorod and surroundings have been declared a UNESCO World Heritage Site. Population: 583,387 (2021 Census).

== Geography ==
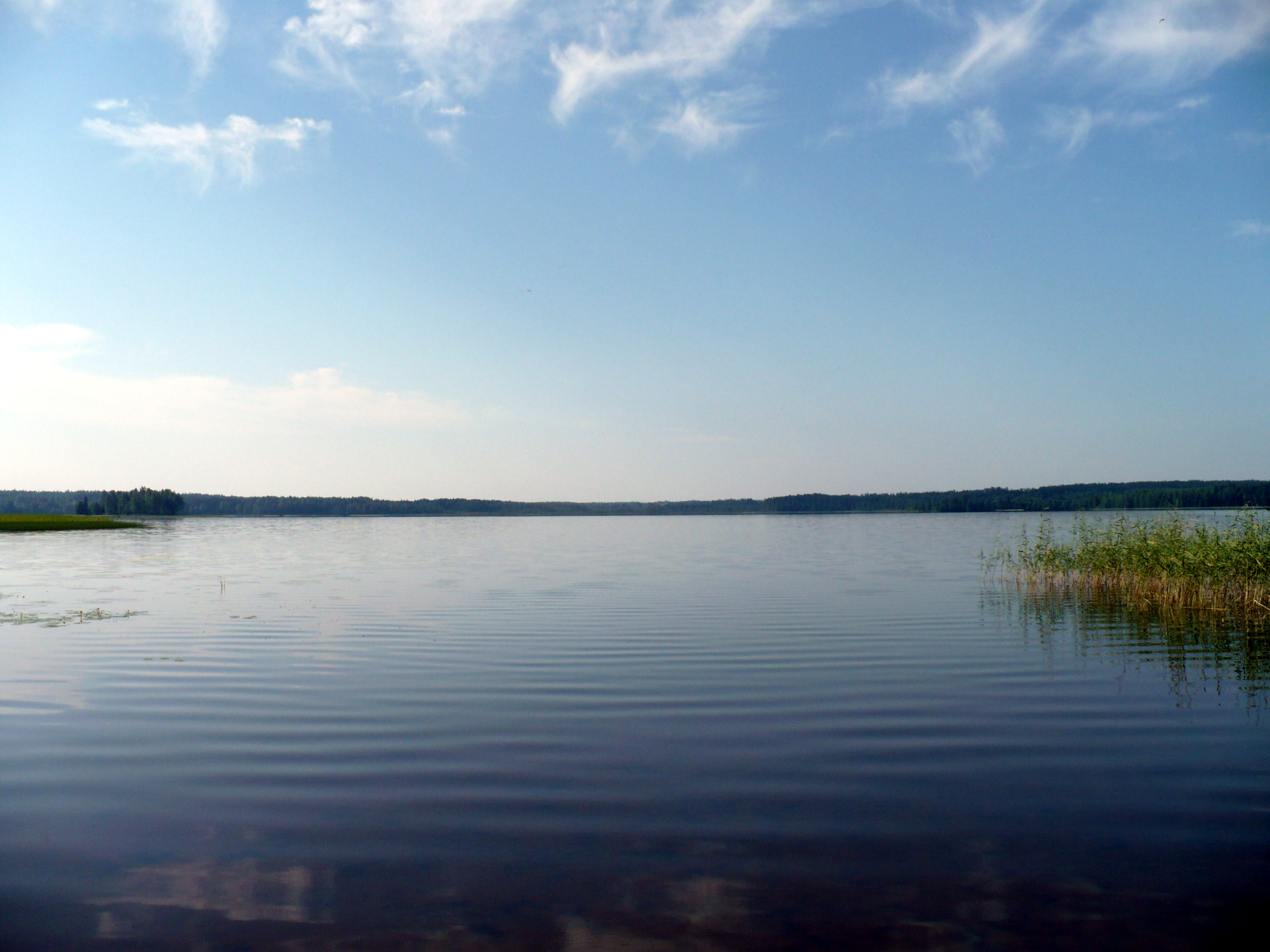
Lake Peretno in Okulovsky District.

Novgorod Oblast borders with Leningrad Oblast in the north and in the northwest, Vologda Oblast in the east, Tver Oblast in the southeast and in the south, and Pskov Oblast in the southwest, which coincidentally has a similar amount of land area as Novgorod Oblast.

The western part is a lowland around Lake Ilmen, while the eastern part is a highland (northern spurs of the Valdai Hills). The highest point is Mount Ryzhokha in the Valdai Hills (296 metres (971 ft)). In the center of the oblast is Lake Ilmen, one of the largest lakes in Central Russia. The major tributaries of Lake Ilmen are the Msta, which originates in the east of the Valdai Hills and collects the rivers in the east of the oblast, the Lovat, the Pola, and the Polist, which all flow to the lake from the south, and the Shelon, flowing from the southwest. The only outflow of the lake is the Volkhov, a major tributary of Lake Ladoga. Almost all of the oblast belongs to the river basin of the Volkhov. The exceptions are the northwest, which belongs to the river basin of the Luga, a tributary of the Baltic Sea, the north, belonging to the basin of the Syas, another tributary of Lake Ladoga, the east, which belongs to the basin of the Mologa, a tributary of the Volga, and the south, belonging to basins of various tributaries of the upper Volga River. Sorted by the discharge, the biggest rivers of the oblast are the Volkhov, the Mologa, the Msta, the Lovat, the Syas, and the Shelon.

The south and the southeast of the oblast contain one of the largest lake districts in European Russia. The biggest lake in the area, Lake Seliger, is divided between Novgorod and Tver Oblasts. Other big lakes in the area include Lake Valdayskoye, Lake Shlino, Lake Velyo, Lake Piros, and Lake Meglino.

Two areas in Novgorod Oblast have been designated as protected natural areas of federal significance. These are Valdaysky National Park in the southeast of the oblast, protecting the lake district and related ecosystems and cultural landscapes, and Rdeysky Nature Reserve in the southwest of the oblast, which protects the Polist-Lovat Swamp System and is adjacent to Polistovsky Nature Reserve in Pskov Oblast.

== History ==
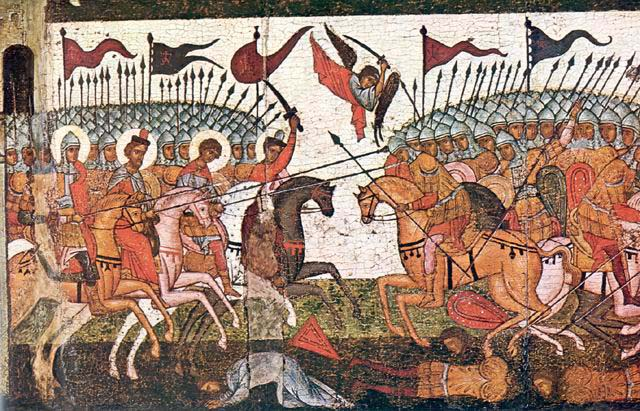
Battle between Novgorod and Suzdal in 1170, the icon from 1460

Novgorod is one of the oldest centers of Russian civilization. It lay on the historical trade route from the Varangians to the Greeks, which followed the Volkhov upstream to Lake Ilmen and then followed the course of the Lovat before eventually reaching the Dnieper River. Novgorod is indicated in the chronicles as the site where Rurik settled and founded the Rurik Dynasty in 862. Subsequently, Rurik's successor, Oleg, moved the capital to Kiev, but Novgorod continued to play an important role until the 15th century. In 1136, Novgorod evicted the prince and became the center of the Novgorod Republic, which included the major part of what is currently northwestern Russia. It was an example of a medieval republic, in which decisions were taken by veche—a meeting of the city population—and the prince was elected. (The only other Russian city with a similar organization was Pskov.) Novgorod linked the river routes of Baltic, Byzantium, Central Asian regions, and all parts of European Russia and flourished as one of the most important trading centres of eastern and northern Europe. It was part of the Hanseatic League which connected it to Central and Northern Europe. Novgorod was one of the few areas of Rus not affected by the Mongol invasions. It was also an important cultural center, and the majority of monuments preserved in Russia from the 11th through the 14th century are those standing in Veliky Novgorod.

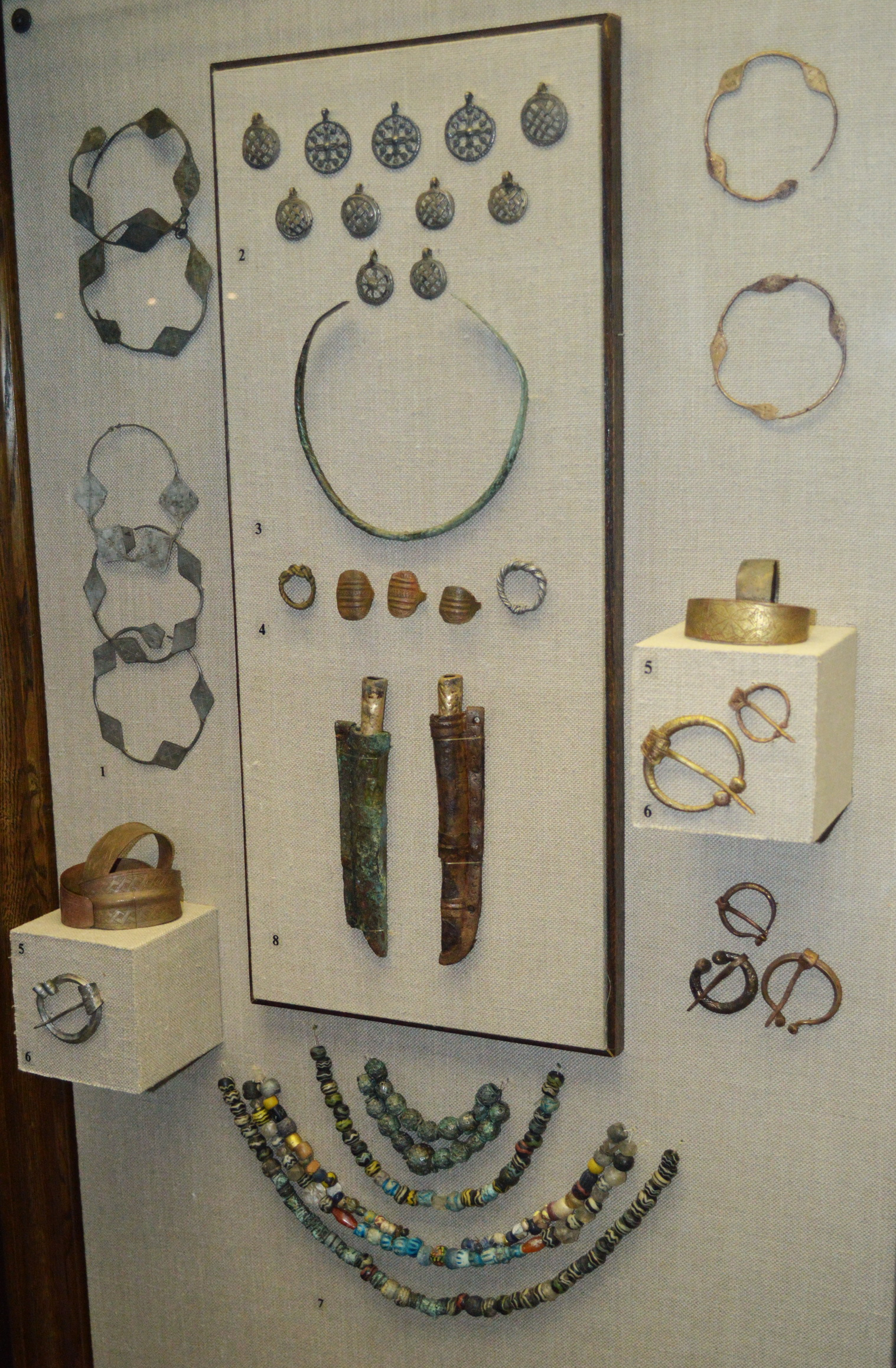
Jewellery decorations of Novgorod slovenes, 11–13 century.

Towards the end of the 15th century Novgorod was defeated by the army of Ivan III, the prince of Moscow, and was included into the Grand Duchy of Moscow. In 1560, Ivan the Terrible, fearing treason, sent his army to sack the city. This event, known as the Massacre of Novgorod, had catastrophic consequences for the city, which lost the majority of its population and never recovered. Additionally, in the beginning of the 17th century, during the Time of Troubles, Novgorod was plundered by the Swedish army.

December 29 [O.S. December 18], 1708 Tsar Peter the Great issued an edict which established seven governorates. The present area of Novgorod oblast was a part of Ingermanland Governorate, which was renamed Saint Petersburg Governorate in 1710. In 1727, a separate Novgorod Governorate was established. It was subdivided into five provinces, and the current area of Novgorod Oblast was split between two of them—Novgorod and Velikiye Luki Provinces. In 1772, Velikiye Luki Province was transferred to newly established Pskov Governorate. In 1775, Novgorod Governorate was transformed to Novgorod Viceroyalty, and in 1777, Pskov Governorate was transformed to Pskov Viceroyalty. In 1796, both governorates were re-established. By the 1920s, most of the area of current Novgorod Oblast belonged to Novgorod Governorate.

Before the 19th century, the areas around Novgorod were considerably better developed than the areas which are currently located in the center and the east of the oblast. In 1851, Moscow – Saint Petersburg Railway, the first long-distance railway in Russia, opened. It bypassed Novgorod as it was built on a straight line between Moscow and Saint Petersburg. The railway construction lead to the development of the adjacent areas and eventually to creation of new towns such as Malaya Vishera, Okulovka, and Chudovo. Later on, the railroads between Sonkovo and Saint Petersburg, as well as between Bologoye and Pskov, and a number of connecting lines, were constructed.

On August 1, 1927 the governorates were abolished, and merged into newly established Leningrad Oblast. Between autumn of 1941 and spring of 1944, during World War II, western parts of the current area of Novgorod Oblast, including the city of Novgorod, were occupied by German troops. Novgorod Oblast was an area of long and fierce battles, such as, for example, the Demyansk Pocket, or the Leningrad–Novgorod Offensive in 1944, when the Soviet troops crossed the Volkhov River. After the liberation, on July 5, 1944, Novgorod Oblast with the center in the city of Novgorod was established.

In 1999, the city of Novgorod was renamed Veliky Novgorod.

== Politics ==
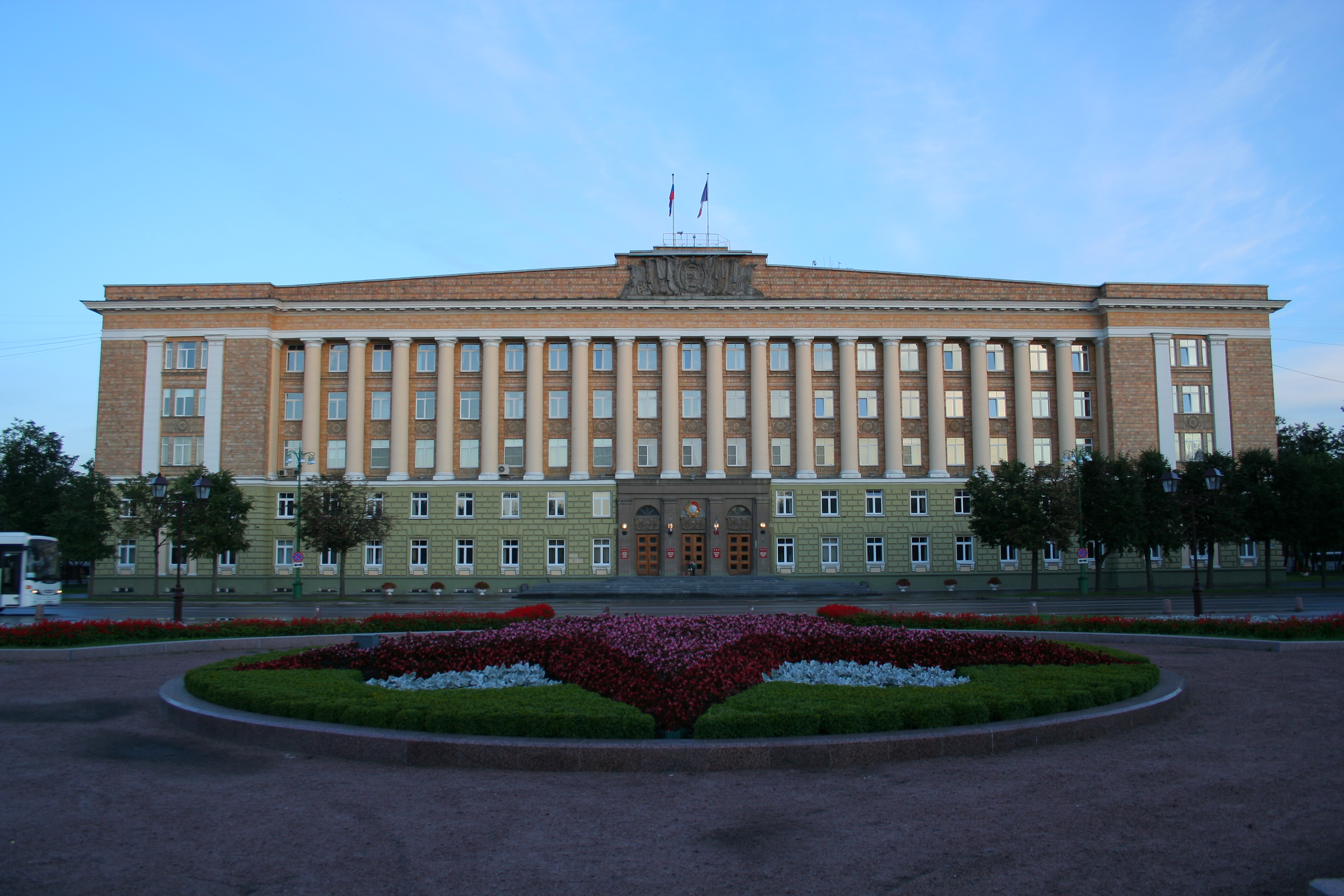
Oblast government seat in Sophia Square, completed in 1959

During the Soviet period, the high authority in the oblast was shared between three persons: The first secretary of the Novgorod CPSU Committee (who in reality had the biggest authority), the chairman of the oblast Soviet (legislative power), and the Chairman of the oblast Executive Committee (executive power). Since 1991, CPSU lost all the power, and the head of the Oblast administration, and eventually the governor was appointed/elected alongside elected regional parliament.

The Charter of Novgorod Oblast is the fundamental law of the region. The Legislative Assembly of Novgorod Oblast is the province's standing legislative (representative) body. The Legislative Assembly exercises its authority by passing laws, resolutions, and other legal acts and by supervising the implementation and observance of the laws and other legal acts passed by it. The highest executive body is the Oblast Government, which includes territorial executive bodies such as district administrations, committees, and commissions that facilitate development and run the day to day matters of the province. The Oblast administration supports the activities of the Governor who is the highest official and acts as guarantor of the observance of the oblast Charter in accordance with the Constitution of Russia.

=== First secretaries of the Novgorod Oblast CPSU Committee ===
In the period when they were the most important authority in the oblast (1944 to 1991), the following first secretaries were appointed:

- 1944–1948 Grigory Kharitonovich Bumagin
- 1948–1951 Mikhail Nikolayevich Tupitsyn
- 1951–1954 Alexander Grigoryevich Fyodorov
- 1954–1956 Terenty Fomich Shtykov
- 1956–1958 Tikhon Ivanovich Sokolov
- 1958–1961 Vasily Andreyevich Prokofyev
- 1961–1972 Vladimir Nikolayevich Bazovsky
- 1972–1986 Nikolay Afanasyevich Antonov
- 1986–1991 Ivan Ivanovich Nikulin

=== Governors ===
Since 1991, governors were sometimes appointed, and sometimes elected:

- 1991–2007 Mikhail Mikhaylovich Prusak, head of the administration, appointed; then governor, elected
- 2007–2017 Sergey Gerasimovich Mitin, governor, appointed, then elected
- 2017–2025 Andrey Nikitin, appointed acting governor in 2017, then elected in 2017 and re-elected in 2022; resigned on 7 February 2025.
- 2025–present Aleksandr Dronov, acting governor from 7 February 2025, formally appointed acting governor by presidential decree on 5 March 2025; elected in September 2025 and inaugurated on 14 October 2025.

On 13 February 2017, by decree of the President of the Russian Federation, Andrei Nikitin was appointed Acting Governor of the Novgorod Oblast. In the elections on 10 September 2017, Nikitin was elected head of the Oblast, and on 14 October 2017, he took office as governor of the Novgorod Oblast.

Results of the election of the Governor of the Novgorod Oblast
Candidate	Election results
A. Nikitin (United Russia)	67.99%
O. Yefimova (Communist Party of the Russian Federation)	16.17%
A. Morozov (Liberal Democratic Party of Russia)	7.51%
N. Zakharov (Patriots of Russia)	4.09%
M. Panov (A Just Russia)	1.71%
Turnout	28.35%

In the elections on 11 September 2022, Nikitin was re-elected for a second term.

Results of the election of the Governor of the Novgorod Oblast
Candidate	Election results
A. Nikitin (United Russia)	77.03%
O. Yefimova (CPRF)	10.99%
A. Chursinov (LDPR)	4.43%
A. Prokopov (Party of Pensioners)	2.56%
S. Shrub (A Just Russia – For Truth)	2.50%
Turnout	32.81%

On 7 February 2025, Nikitin resigned before the expiration of his second term to take up another position in the federal government. First Deputy Governor Aleksandr Dronov initially assumed the governor's duties, and on 5 March 2025 he was formally appointed acting governor by presidential decree.

An early gubernatorial election was held from 12 to 14 September 2025. Dronov, the United Russia candidate, was elected governor with 62.19% of the vote.

Results of the 2025 election of the Governor of the Novgorod Oblast
Candidate	Election results
A. Dronov (United Russia)	62.19%
O. Yefimova (CPRF)	14.40%
A. Chursinov (LDPR)	9.53%
N. Shvabovich (A Just Russia – For Truth)	6.04%
N. Zakharov (Party of Pensioners)	5.27%
Turnout	37.71%

Dronov was inaugurated as governor on 14 October 2025 for a five-year term.

=== Novgorod Oblast Duma ===
The Novgorod Oblast Duma consists of 32 deputies elected by a mixed electoral system for a term of 5 years: 12 deputies are elected in a single constituency and 20 in single-member constituencies.

The last elections of deputies of the Novgorod Oblast Duma were held on 18–20 September 2026.

Results of the elections of deputies of the Novgorod Oblast Duma of the VIII convocation
Political party	Election results, %
United Russia	38.12
CPRF	14.60
LDPR	11.94
New People	9.94
A Just Russia	7.72
Yabloko	6.38
Party of Pensioners	5.54
Turnout	43.80

There are 7 factions formed in the Novgorod Oblast Duma:

- United Russia — 26 deputies,
- CPRF — 1 deputy,
- LDPR — 1 deputy,
- A Just Russia — 1 deputy,
- New People — 1 deputy,
- Party of Pensioners — 1 deputy,
- Yabloko — 1 deputy.

The current Chairman of the Novgorod Oblast Duma - Yuri Bobryshev (United Russia).

=== Political parties ===
As of 14 January 2019, 35 regional branches of political parties were registered in the Novgorod Oblast.

The leading political force in the Novgorod Oblast is the regional branch of the United Russia party. The secretary of the Novgorod Oblast branch of the party is Sergey Fabrichny. Local branches have been established in all municipal districts and city districts of the Oblast.

The first secretary of the regional branch of the CPRF is Valery Gaidim. Local branches of the party have been established in all municipal and urban districts of the Oblast.

The Chairman of the Council of the Oblast branch of the A Just Russia party is Alexei Afanasyev. Local branches of the party have been established in all municipal districts and urban districts of the Oblast.

Alexey Chursinov coordinates the work of the Novgorod Oblast Branch of the LDPR. Local branches of the party have been established in all municipal districts and urban districts of the Oblast.

The Novgorod Oblast regional branch of Yabloko is chaired by Anna Cherepanova, who has led it since 2017. The party is represented in the eighth convocation of the Novgorod Oblast Duma by Viktor Shalyakin, who heads its one-member faction.

Sergey Mitin is the member of the Federation Council of the Federal Assembly from the executive body of the Novgorod Oblast. The member of the Federation Council of the Federal Assembly from the legislative body of the Novgorod Oblast is Elena Pisareva.

== Economy ==
=== Industry ===
As of 2014, industry was responsible for about 40% of the GNP of the oblast. The main industrial enterprises in the oblast are four chemical plants, all located in Veliky Novgorod and specializing mostly in production of fertilizers, a metallurgical plant, also in Veliky Novgorod, producing copper, and a plant in Borovichi producing refractory materials.

=== Agriculture ===
The main specialization of agriculture in the oblast is cattle breeding with meat and milk production. In 2011, approximately 90% of the farms held cattle, and 79% of all agricultural production in the oblast were meat, milk, and eggs. A number of large-scale farms are keeping pigs and poultry. Bee-keeping, as well as cultivating of crops and potatoes, are also present.

=== Transportation ===
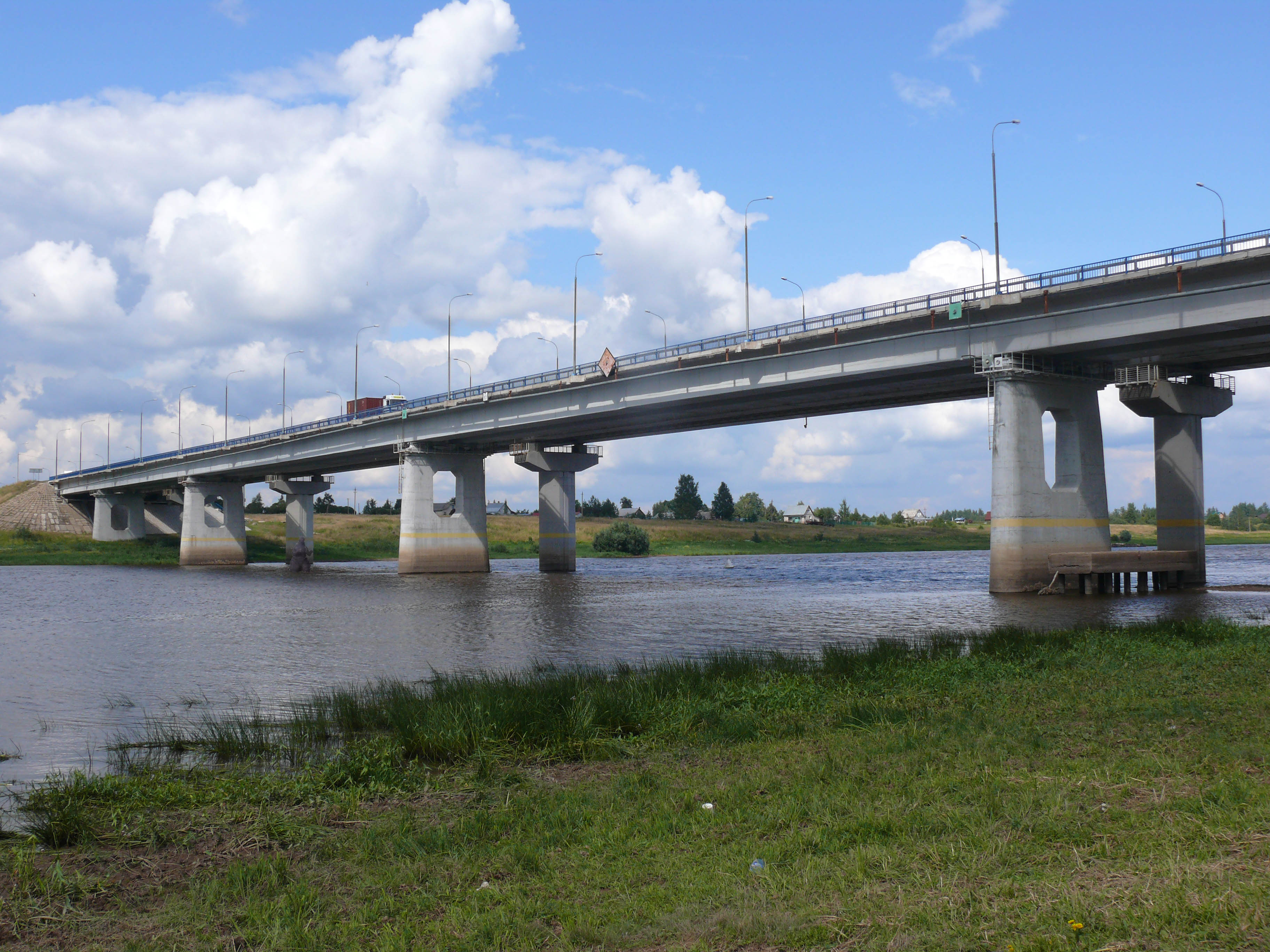
Bridge on the M10 Highway over the Volkhov River

Novgorod appeared as a site on one of the most important Middle-Age trade routes. The importance of waterways has considerably diminished since those days, but Lake Ilmen, the Volkhov River, and lower courses of main tributaries of lake Ilmen—the Lovat, the Msta, the Polist, and the Shelon, as well as Lake Seliger, remain navigable.

The Saint Petersburg – Moscow Railway crosses the oblast from southeast to northwest. The major train stations are Okulovka, Malaya Vishera, and Chudovo. In Chudovo, one railroad branches off south to Veliky Novgorod, and another one north to Volkhovstroy and eventually to Murmansk. Another railway line, connecting Sonkovo and Mga, runs parallel to the first one north of it. A line between Okulovka and Nebolchi makes a connection between the two. Additionally, Veliky Novgorod is connected by railway to Saint Petersburg and Luga. A railway crosses the south of the oblast as well, connecting Bologoye and Pskov via Parfino and Staraya Russa.

The Kushaverskoye peat narrow gauge railway for hauling peat operates in the Khvoyninsky District, and Tyosovo peat narrow gauge railway for hauling peat operates in the Novgorodsky District.

The road network is well developed within the oblast, though only a small number of roads cross borders with Tver Oblast west of Valday and Leningrad Oblast east of Lyubytino. One highway of federal significance, M10, which connects Moscow and Saint Petersburg, crosses the oblast, running through Valday, Kresttsy, and Veliky Novgorod (there is a bypass of Veliky Novgorod). Highways connect Veliky Novgorod with Pskov and with Velikiye Luki, among other destinations.

Novgorod Airport and Krechevitsy Airport are both located around Veliky Novgorod, however, there are no regular passenger flights. Novgorod Airport is basically abandoned.

== Administrative divisions ==
The oblast is administratively divided into three cities and towns under the oblast's jurisdiction (Veliky Novgorod, Borovichi, and Staraya Russa) and twenty-one districts. Another seven towns (Chudovo, Kholm, Malaya Vishera, Okulovka, Pestovo, Soltsy, and Valday) have the status of the towns of district significance.

== Demographics ==
Historical population
Year	Pop.	±%
1897	1,367,022	—
1926	1,050,604	−23.1%
1959	736,529	−29.9%
1970	721,471	−2.0%
1979	721,790	+0.0%
1989	753,054	+4.3%
2002	694,355	−7.8%
2010	634,111	−8.7%
2021	583,387	−8.0%
2025	566,745	−2.9%
Source: Census data, estimate

Population: 583,387 (2021 Census), down from 634,111 recorded by the 2010 Census, and further down from about 753,054 recorded in the 1989 Census.

Novgorod Oblast has the lowest population for any oblast in the European part of Russia. One of the reasons for the relatively low population density, particularly the male population, is that the area suffered heavily during World War II. The population is 70.6% urban.

Ethnic groups: Novgorod Oblast is relatively homogenous, with only three recognized ethnic groups of more than two thousand persons each at the time of the 2021 Census. In the 2021 Census, the following ethnicities were most numerous: 481,858 Russians (95.4%); 2,931 Ukrainians (0.6%); 2,498 Romani (0.5%); 1,943 Tajiks (0.4%); 1,409 Belarusians (0.3%); 14,308 others. Additionally, 78,440 people were registered from administrative databases, and could not declare an ethnicity. It is estimated that the proportion of ethnic groups in this group is the same as that of the declared group.

Vital statistics for 2024:

- Births: 3,757 (6.6 per 1,000)
- Deaths: 9,059 (15.9 per 1,000)

Total fertility rate (2024):
1.22 children per woman

Life expectancy (2021):
Total — 67.64 years (male — 62.48, female — 72.80)

=== Religion ===
Religion in Novgorod Oblast as of 2012 (Sreda Arena Atlas)
Russian Orthodoxy	46.8%
Other Christians	5.2%
Islam	0.8%
Spiritual but not religious	33.6%
Atheism and irreligion	9.8%
Other and undeclared	3.8%

According to a 2012 survey 46.8% of the population of Novgorod Oblast adheres to the Russian Orthodox Church, 4% are unaffiliated generic Christians, 1% are Muslims. In addition, 34% of the population declares to be "spiritual but not religious", 10% is atheist, and 3.9% follows other religions or did not give an answer to the question.

== Culture and recreation ==
Novgorod is one of the oldest Russian cities and was an important part of the Old Rus. Like many Russian cities Novgorod preserved its own local characteristics of traditional Russian culture. Despite great damages, in particular, during World War II, a large amount of medieval monuments of art, archeology, and architecture survive. Many of those are included into the World Heritage site Historic Monuments of Novgorod and Surroundings. The majority of them are operated by the Novgorod Museum Reserve. The Saint Sophia Cathedral in Novgorod is the oldest Christian church in Russia with the exception of the Caucasus area. Since Novgorod was not affected by the Mongol invasions, it keeps a fair share of pre-Mongol buildings, most of which are concentrated in the city of Veliky Novgorod and its immediate surroundings. The only pre-Mongol building in Novgorod Oblast outside the Veliky Novgorod agglomeration is the Katholikon of the Transfiguration Cathedral in Staraya Russa, built in the end of the 12th century. Novgorod has, furthermore, a large number of architectural monuments constructed in the 13th–14th centuries, of which the Church of the Transfiguration on Ilyina Street is a representative example.

Novgorod developed a distinct school of icon painting, which considerably affected not only the nearby Pskov and the Northern Russia which was dependent on Novgorod, but also in general the old Russian painting. The oldest survived Novgorod icons are dated by the 12th century. Theophanes the Greek, one of the most notable old Russian artists, spent a part of his life in Novgorod, creating, in particular, frescoes in the Church of the Transfiguration on Ilyina Street. The East Slavic instrument Gusli was first recorded in the north Russian regions around the era of Novgorodian Rus'. The oldest Onion domes which became a popular feature of Russian culture and architecture originated among other regions also in Veliky Novgorod.

The archaeological excavations in Novgorod and Staraya Russa unearthed over a thousand of birch bark manuscripts, used mostly to document various business issues. Currently, these manuscripts serve as the main source on the everyday life in the ancient Russia. Many medieval chronicles originate from Novgorod, the first one being the Novgorod First Chronicle, which covers the period between 1016 and 1471. In 14th century the Slavic-Nordic pirates Ushkuiniks spread in the Russian north and later in many other regions of ancient Russia.

After Novgorod was subordinated to Moscow in the end of the 15th century, its cultural significance gradually diminished. However, Valday Iversky Monastery, founded in the 17th century, served as a major cultural center, and in the 18th–19th centuries many important figures of Russian history owned estates in Novgorod Governorate. For example, generalissimo Alexander Suvorov, a Russian military commander notable for military operations against the Ottoman Empire and against the army of Napoleon in the late 18th century, owned the estate of Konchansko-Suvorovskoye, currently in Borovichsky District, and authors Gleb Uspensky and Nikolay Nekrasov owned summer houses in and near Chudovo. In 1862, the Millennium of Russia monument was erected in Novgorod to commemorate the thousand years of Rurik arrival to Novgorod.

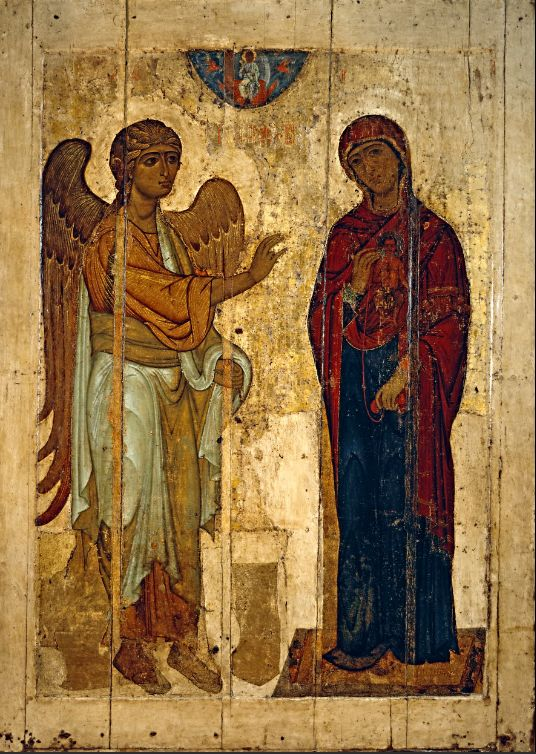
Ustyug Annunciation, a Novgorod icon from the 12th century

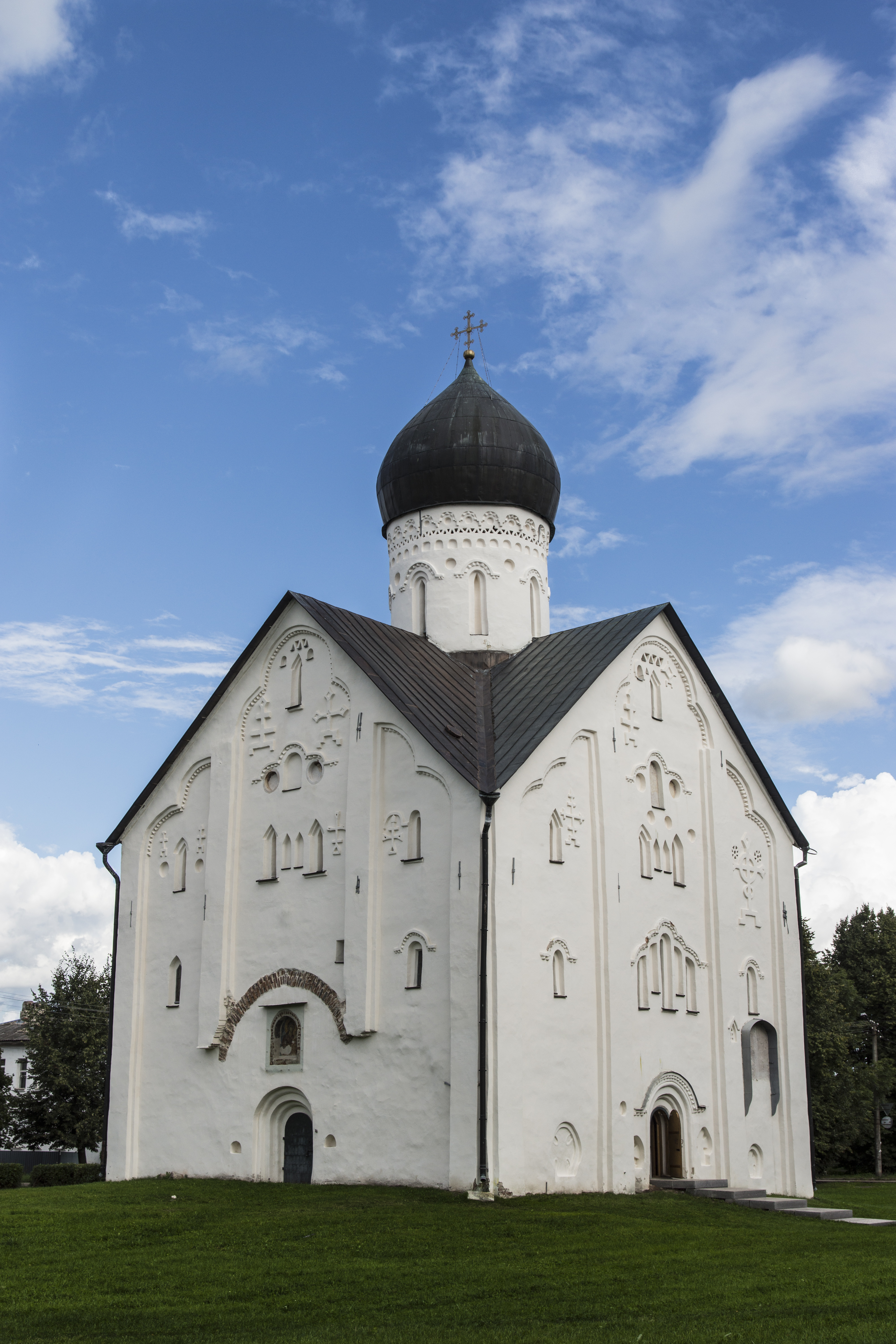
Church of the Transfiguration on Ilyina Street, Veliky Novgorod

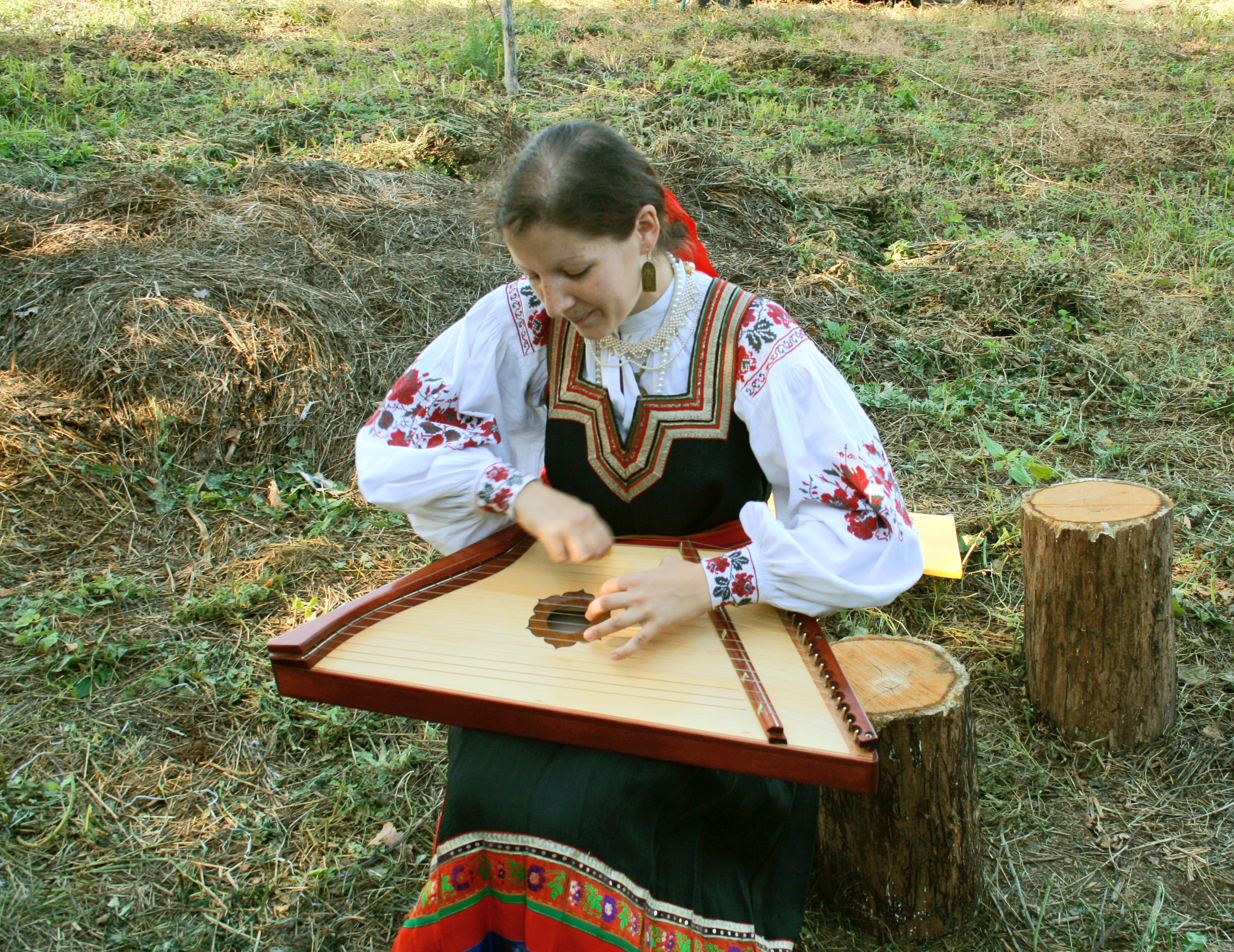
The Gusli instrument was first recorded in 12th century in Novgordian Rus'.

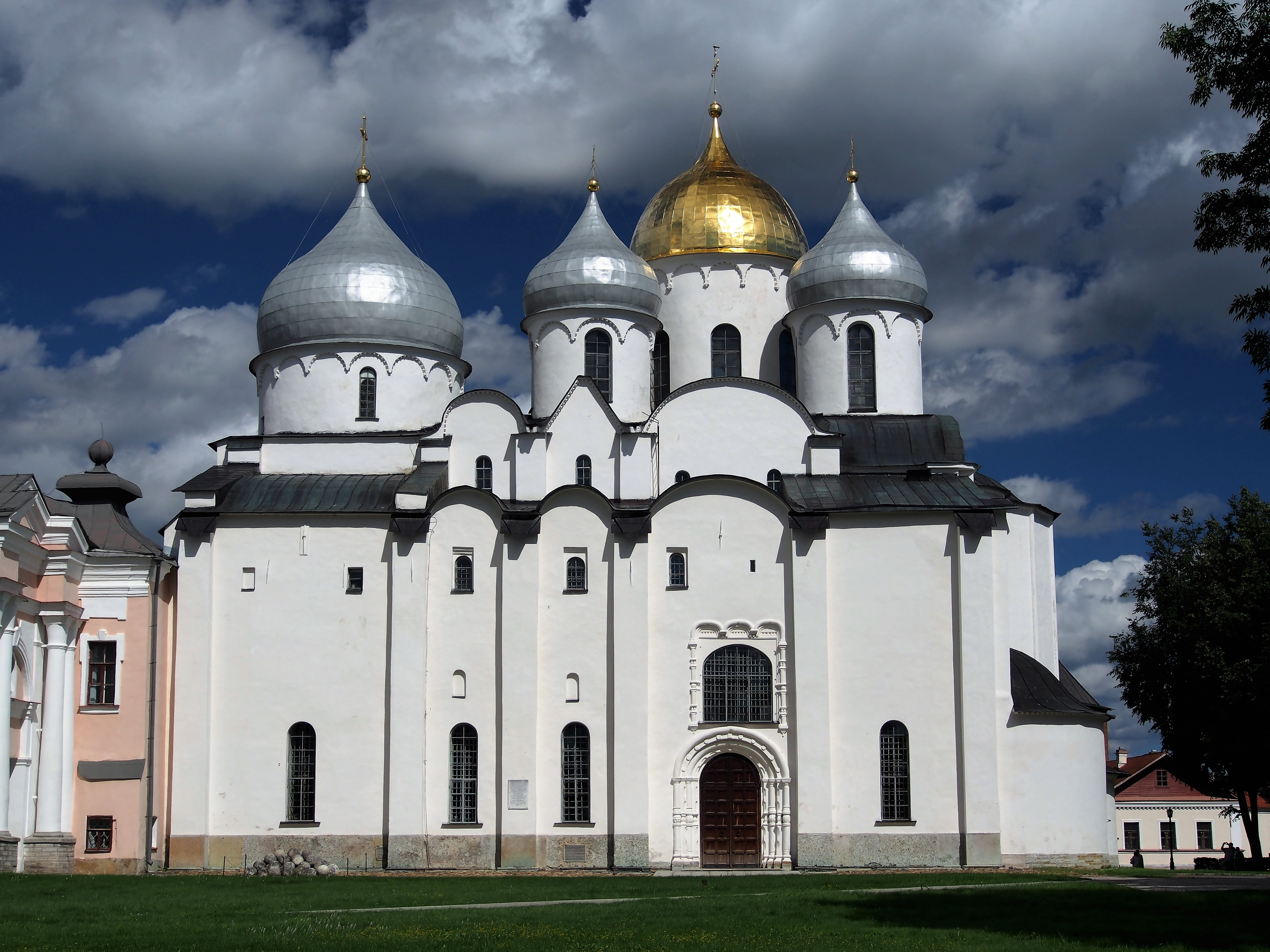
The Saint Sophia Cathedral of Novgorod was one of the first churches which introduced Onion domes

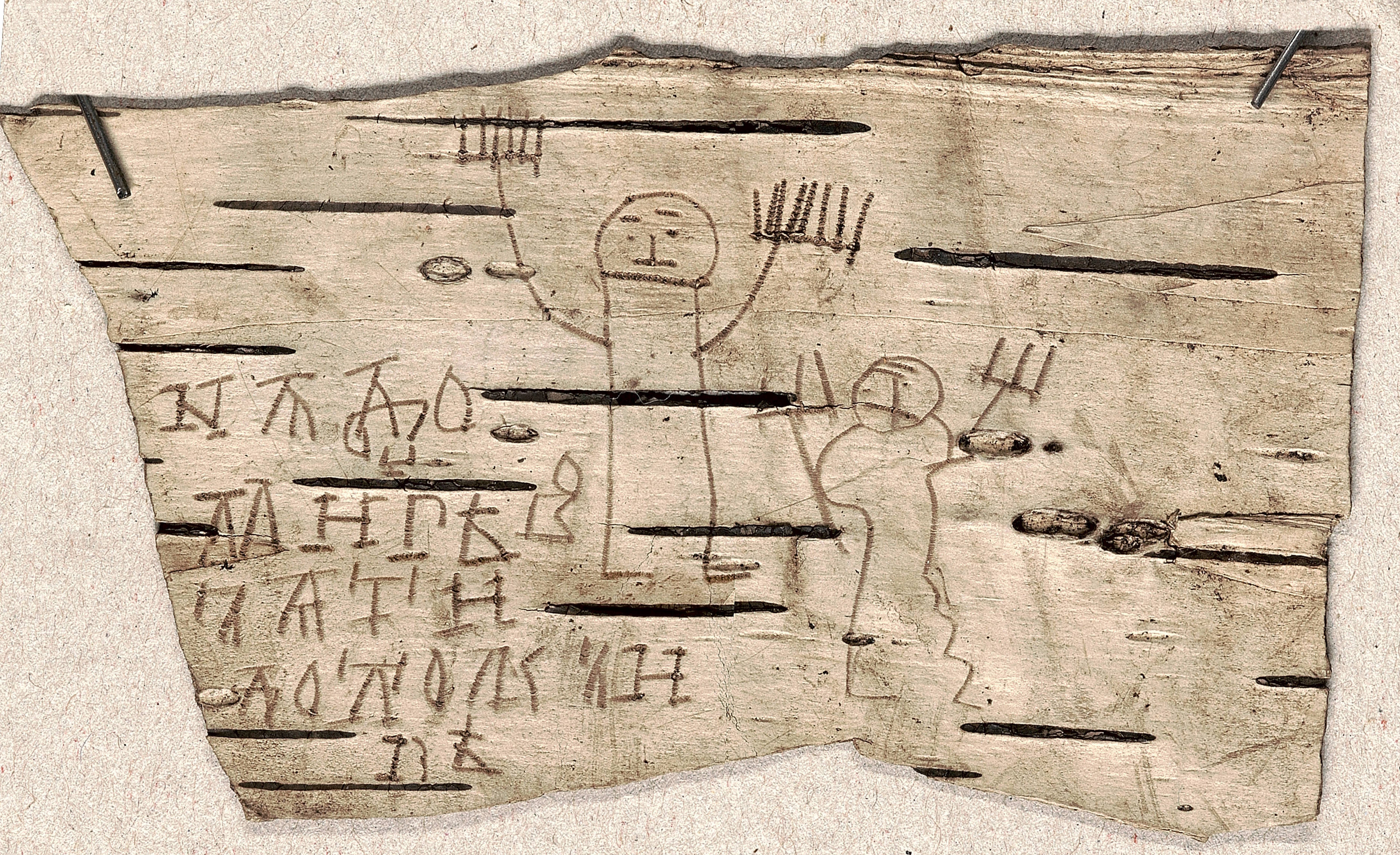
The birch bark manuscript No. 202 written by Onfim, unearthed in Novgorod

== Media ==
In Novgorod Oblast, a local television channel named Novgorod Oblast Television was set up in April 2004.
