= Sergey Mitin (politician) =

Russian politician (born 1951)

- Сергей Митин
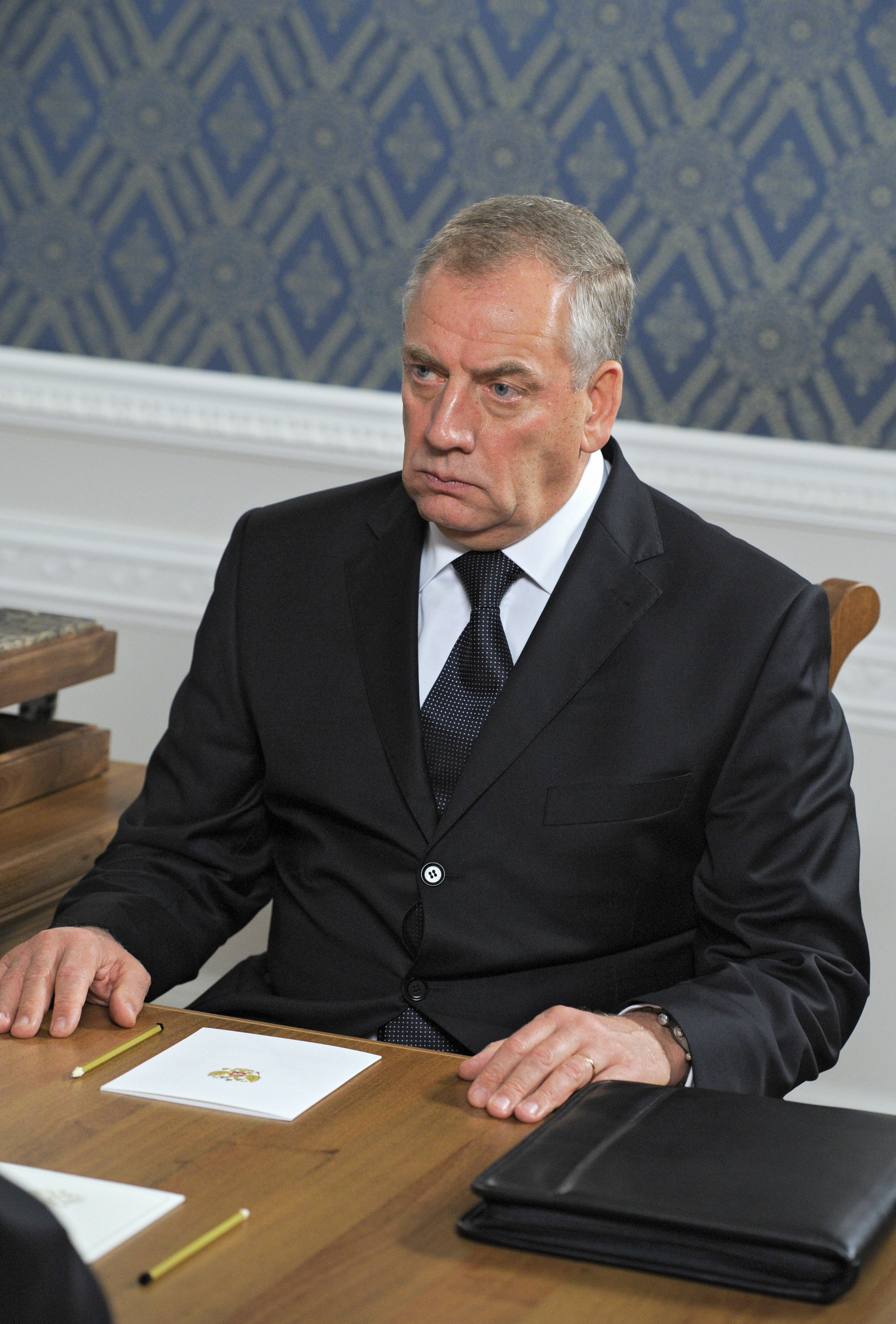
- Mitin in 2011

Russian Federation Senator from Novgorod Oblast
- In office 14 October 2017 – 15 October 2025
- Preceded by: Aleksey Kostyukov
- Succeeded by: Yevgeny Dietrich

2nd Governor of Novgorod Oblast
- In office 3 August 2007 – 13 February 2017
- Preceded by: Mikhail Prusak
- Succeeded by: Andrey Nikitin

Personal details
- Born: Sergey Gerasimovich Mitin; Серге́й Гера́симович Ми́тин; 14 June 1951 (age 75) Gorky, Soviet Union
- Party: United Russia
- Profession: Engineer

Sergey Gerasimovich Mitin (Russian: Серге́й Гера́симович Ми́тин; born 14 June 1951) is a Russian politician serving as a Senator from the executive authority of Novgorod Oblast since 2017. Previously, Mitin served as Governor of Novgorod Oblast, Russia from 7 August 2007 to 13 February 2017.

== Sanctions ==
Mitin was sanctioned by the UK government in 2022 in relation to the Russo-Ukrainian War.
