= Andrey Nikitin (politician) =

Russian economist and politician

- Андрей Никитин
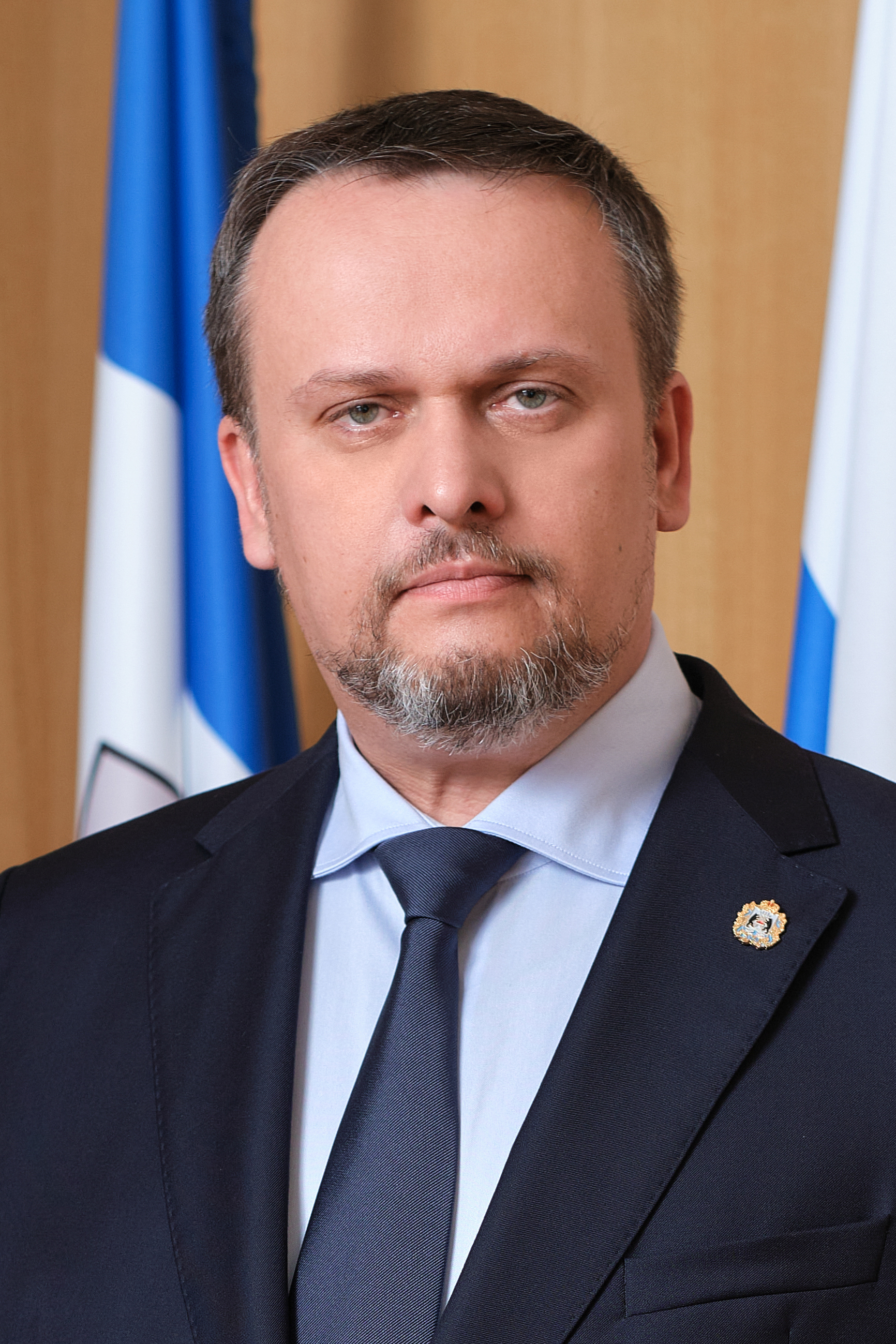
- Nikitin in 2024

Deputy Prime Minister for Transport
- Incumbent
- Assumed office 22 October 2026
- President: Vladimir Putin
- Prime Minister: Mikhail Mishustin
- Preceded by: Vitaly Savelyev

Minister of Transport
- In office 8 July 2025; Acting: 7 – 8 July 2025 – 22 October 2026
- President: Vladimir Putin
- Prime Minister: Mikhail Mishustin
- Preceded by: Roman Starovoyt
- Succeeded by: Dmitry Yadrov

Deputy Minister of Transport
- In office 7 February 2025 – 7 July 2025
- Preceded by: Dmitry Bakanov

3rd Governor of Novgorod Oblast
- In office 13 February 2017 – 7 February 2025
- President: Vladimir Putin
- Prime Minister: Dimitry Medvedev
- Preceded by: Sergey Mitin
- Succeeded by: Aleksandr Dronov

Personal details
- Born: Andrey Sergeyevich Nikitin; 26 November 1979 (age 46) Moscow, Soviet Union
- Party: United Russia
- Education: State University of Management; Stockholm School of Economics

Andrey Sergeyevich Nikitin (Russian: Андрей Сергеевич Никитин; born 26 November 1979) is a Russian economist and government official who served as the Governor of Novgorod Oblast from 2017 to 2025. He served as Minister of Transport from 8 July 2025 to 22 October 2026. He previously served as Deputy Minister of Transport between February and July 2025.

== Biography ==
Andrey Nikitin was born on 26 November 1979. Although he was born in Moscow, he lived in Miass, Chelyabinsk Oblast for almost 16 years. After graduation in 2001, he entered the State University of Management (GUU, Moscow), and received a diploma in the specialty "State and Municipal Management". He continued his postgraduate studies, in 2006, he defended his thesis on "The Strategy of Organizational Change as an Instrument of Effective Management (Methodological Aspect)" and became a candidate of economic sciences. In 2008, Nikitin was awarded the MBA from the Stockholm School of Economics. The same year he became associate professor of the Department of Theory of Organization and Management of the State University of Management.

On 13 February 2017, Andrey Nikitin was appointed the acting Governor of Novgorod Oblast by decree of Russian President Vladimir Putin. On 10 September 2017, having collected 67.99% of the vote, he was elected Governor of the Novgorod Region. He took office as Governor of the Novgorod Region on 14 October 2017.

In 2018, he defended his doctoral dissertation on "Formation and effective functioning of regional management teams" and became a doctor of economic Sciences.

He was awarded the Medal of the Order "For Merit to the Fatherland" II degree.

He is a member of the Presidium of the presidential Council for economic modernization and innovative development of Russia, and a member of the Presidium of the State Council of the Russian Federation. He is also a member of the Supervisory Board of the Agency for Strategic Initiatives to promote new projects.
