= Novgorod Oblast Duma =

Regional parliament of Novgorod Oblast, Russia

Novgorod Oblast Duma Новгородская областная дума

Type
- Type: Unicameral

Leadership
- Chairman: Yury Bobryshev, United Russia since 6 October 2021

Structure
- Seats: 32
- Political groups: United Russia (26); CPRF (1); LDPR (1); New People (1); SRZP (1); Yabloko (1); RPPSJ (1)

Elections
- Last election: 20 September 2026
- Next election: 2031

Meeting place
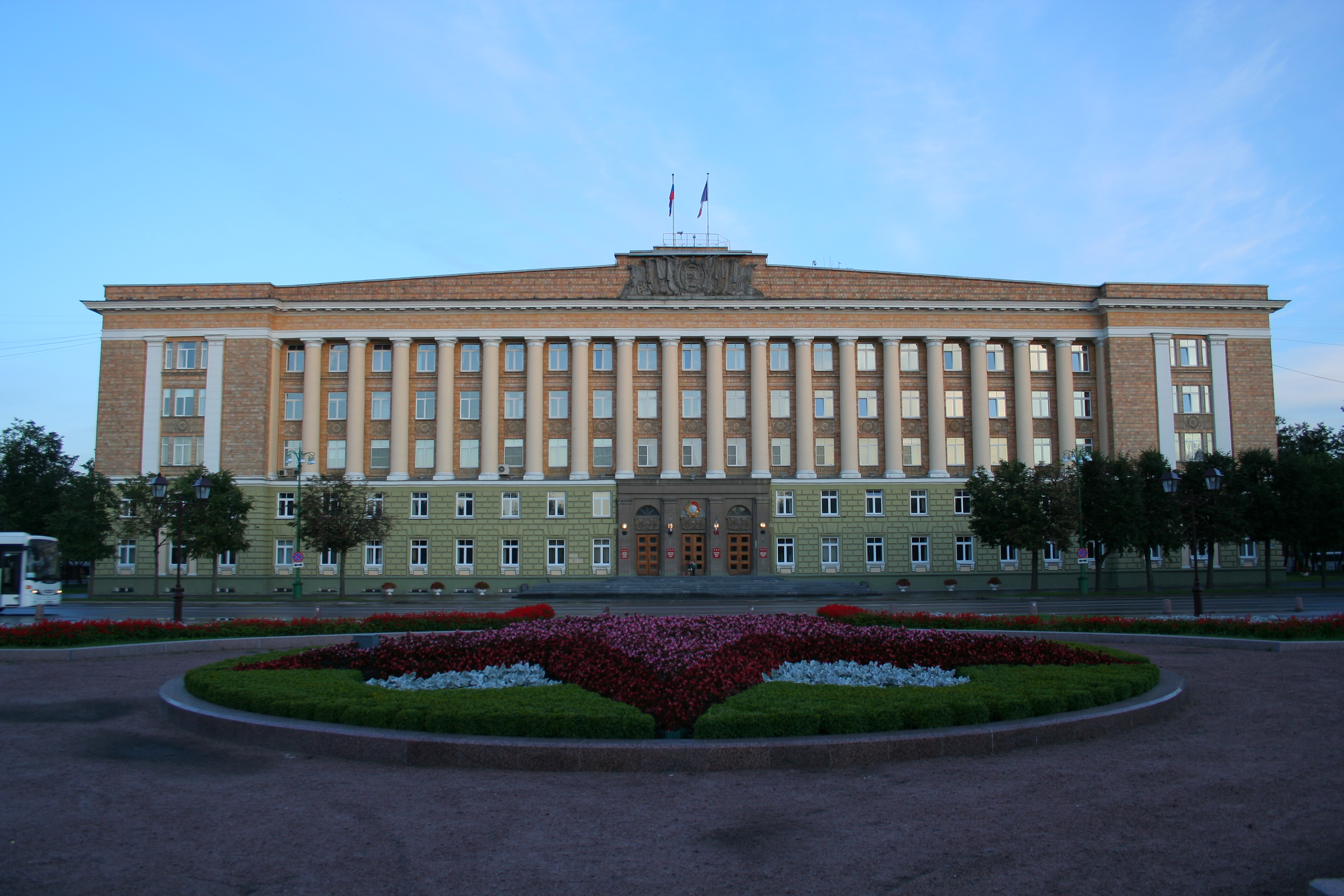
- 1 Victory Square, Veliky Novgorod

Website
- duma.novreg.ru

The Novgorod Oblast Duma (Russian: Новгородская областная дума, romanized: Novgorodskaya oblastnaya duma) is the regional parliament of Novgorod Oblast, a federal subject of Russia. The parliament consists of a total of 32 deputies who are elected for five-year terms. The parliament's seat is in the city of Veliky Novgorod.

== Composition ==
=== 2021 ===
Party	%	Seats
United Russia	29.46	23
Communist Party of the Russian Federation	19.81	2
A Just Russia — For Truth	15.76	3
Liberal Democratic Party of Russia	8.99	1
New People	8.37	1
Russian Party of Pensioners for Social Justice	5.80	1
Registered voters/turnout	40.26	

=== 2026 ===
Party	%	Seats
United Russia	38.12	26
Communist Party of the Russian Federation	14.60	1
Liberal Democratic Party of Russia	11.94	1
New People	9.94	1
A Just Russia	7.72	1
Yabloko	6.38	1
Russian Party of Pensioners for Social Justice	5.54	1
Registered voters/turnout	43.80	
