= Suspicious Russia-related deaths since 2022 =

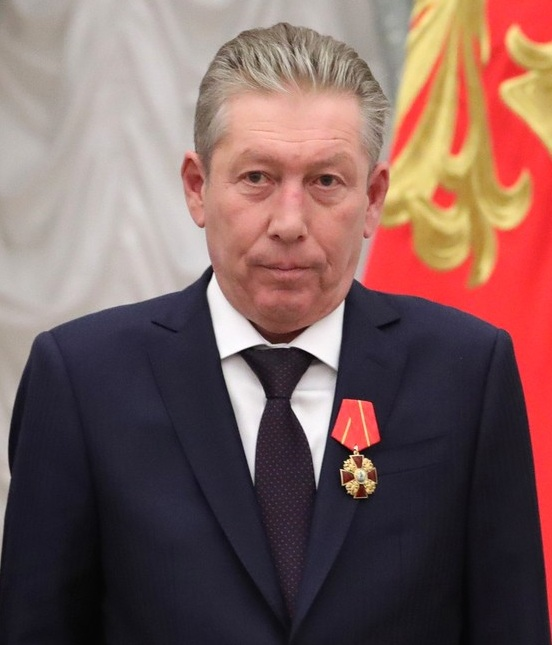
Ravil Maganov, chairman of the national oil company Lukoil, fell from a Kremlin Hospital window under suspicious circumstances, according to reports: CCTV cameras had been "turned off for repairs", President Putin was visiting the hospital the same day, and associates did not believe he was suicidal.

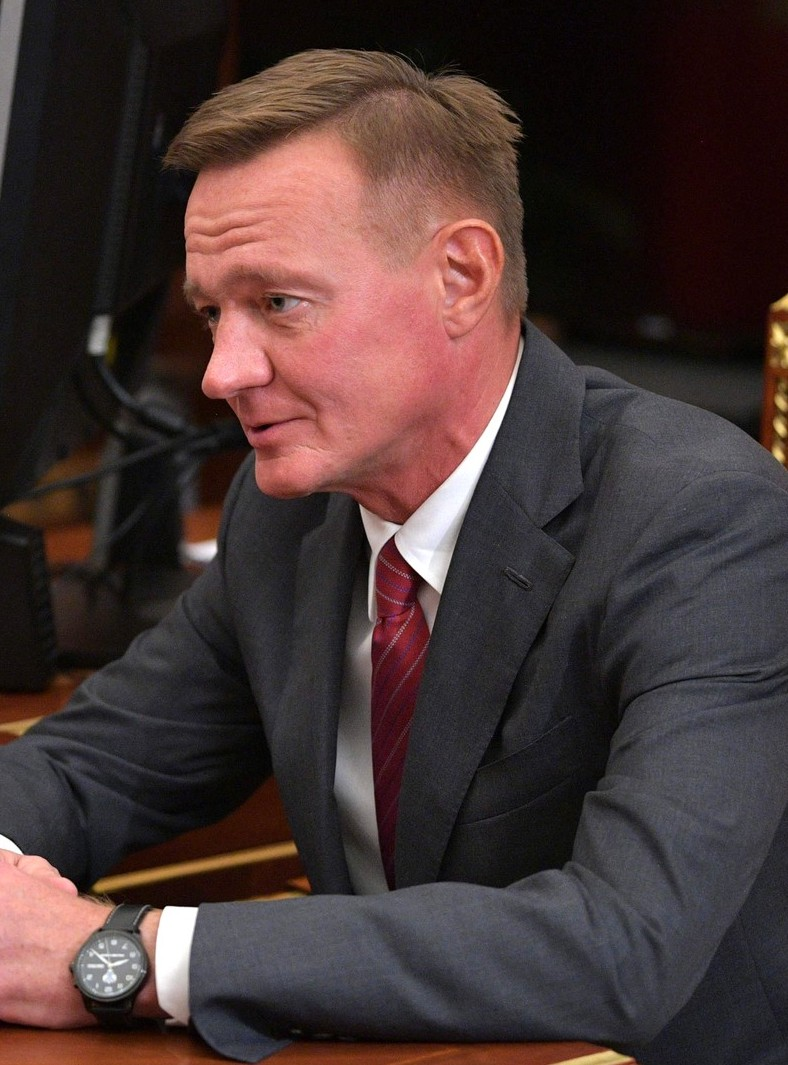
Roman Starovoyt, the Russian Minister of Transport, was dismissed by President Putin on 7 July 2025 and was found dead on the same day.

Since the beginning of 2022, numerous Russia-related people, particularly businessmen and officials, have died under what some sources suggest were suspicious circumstances. Incidents include individuals who have suspiciously fallen out of windows, killed themselves, and died unexpectedly in accidents. Many businessmen were linked to energy companies such as Gazprom and Lukoil. The phenomenon has been called "sudden Russian death syndrome" or "sudden oligarch death syndrome", a play on sudden arrhythmic death syndrome.

Many analysts have suggested some deaths are political assassinations by the Russian state, including the Federal Security Service, related to greater pressure from the Russo-Ukrainian war and ensuing international sanctions against Russia. Others have argued more really are suicides, and some could be killings by competing influential clans to wipe out competitors.

== Analysis ==
On 3 June 2022, the Dutch NOS news network described the phenomenon as "a grim series of Russian billionaires, many from the oil and gas industries, who have been found dead under unusual circumstances since early this year. The first was on 30 January, when 60-year-old Leonid Shulman, transport chief for Russian energy giant Gazprom, was found dead in the bathroom of his country house in the Leningrad region. Beside his body was a suicide note." On 6 July 2022, CNN Portugal described the group as "millionaires with direct or indirect links to the Kremlin found dead in a mystery scenario since the beginning of the year". It referred to a previous investigation by USA Today, which concluded that "38 Russian businessmen and oligarchs close to the Kremlin died in mysterious or suspicious circumstances between 2014 and 2017." The phenomenon has been called "sudden Russian death syndrome" or "sudden oligarch death syndrome", a play on sudden arrhythmic death syndrome. A number of them died by falling from heights, including possibly being thrown out of windows.

Some commentators ruled out suicides or poor health. Other commentators, including Fiona Hill and Mark Galeotti, are skeptical of such conspiracies. They point out the deaths are not necessarily all connected, and that it is far more likely some really are suicides, and some could be killings by competing influential clans to wipe out competitors without a centralized Kremlin effort.

The suicide rate in Russia is the third-highest in the world, and similar trends were noted in 2020 about doctors who had treated COVID-19 patients falling from high windows. Suicides could be further increased especially in the Russian business community due to substantial pressure from the war in Ukraine and international sanctions.

=== Calls for further investigations ===
Friends and families of the deceased Russian businessmen generally found it "unthinkable" that they killed themselves – and in some cases also their wives and children – and have demanded an independent investigation into the mysterious deaths. Igor Volobuyev, the Ukrainian-born ex-vice-chairman of Gazprombank, who left Russia during the outbreak of the 2022 Russian invasion of Ukraine and joined the Freedom of Russia Legion, said in an interview with The Insider that he thought that his former colleague Vladislav Avayev's alleged murder of his family and subsequent suicide had been staged: "Why? That is difficult to say. Perhaps he knew something and posed some kind of danger." Likewise, Sergey Protosenya's son, who was not in Spain when his parents and sister were found dead in Lloret de Mar, stated his father was not the perpetrator ("my father is not a murderer"), but that his parents and sister were murdered by someone else. Protosenya was the former CEO of gas giant Novatek, which published a statement saying he was "a real family man", and called on the Spanish authorities to conduct a thorough and impartial investigation.

Businessman and critic of the Russian federal government Bill Browder has opined that Putin is personally ordering executions of influential business leaders in critical sectors whom he feels will not be yes-men and intimidates their successors with threats of death or violence. In Russian mokroye delo or “wet work” is the name given to the business of assassination with people told to commit suicide or they and their families will receive a visitation.

According to an investigative report by Novaya Gazeta, some of the deaths may be connected to large scale accounting fraud by Gazprom executives, who may have funneled money to a network of businesses owned by friends and family members with ties to the FSB and Russian military.

== Suspicious deaths ==
=== 2022 ===
2022 Deaths
_{1} / _{3} / _{4} / _{6} / _{2} / _{3} / _{1} / _{1} / _{5} / _{1} / _{3} / _{8}; Jan / Feb / Mar / Apr / May / Jun / Jul / Aug / Sep / Oct / Nov / Dec	Total: 38

Name	Age at death	Position	Date of death	Count of deaths	Place body was discovered	Circumstances
January
Leonid Shulman	60	Director of Transport of Gazprom	30 January 2022	1	(Russia) Bathroom of a residence in Leningrad Oblast	Suicide note found next to his body.
February
Igor Nosov	43	CEO of the Far East and Arctic Development Corporation (KRDV) and former Deputy governor of Nizhny Novgorod Oblast	8 February 2022	1	(Russia) Moscow	Reportedly suffered a stroke.
Alexander Tyulakov	61	Deputy General Director of the Unified Settlement Center of Gazprom	25 February 2022	1	(Russia) Garage of a residence in Saint Petersburg	Suicide note found on his body.
Mikhail Watford	66	Businessman	28 February 2022	1	(United Kingdom) Garage of a residence in Surrey, England	British authorities have not found evidence of a crime.
March
Vasily Melnikov	43	CEO and owner of Medstorm	23 March 2022	4	(Russia) Apartment in Nizhny Novgorod	Wife and two sons found dead beside him.
April
Vladislav Avayev	51	Former Vice President of Gazprombank	18 April 2022	3	(Russia) Apartment in Moscow	Wife and 13-year-old daughter found dead beside him.
Sergey Protosenya	55	Former Deputy Chairman of Novatek.	19 April 2022	3	Garden of a residence in Lloret de Mar, Spain	Hanged from a handrail; wife and daughter found dead in their beds with blunt axe wounds and stab wounds.
May
Andrei Krukovsky	37	General Director of the Estosadok Krasnaya Polyana, a ski resort owned by Gazprom	1 May 2022	1	(Russia) Below a cliff near the Achipse Fortress in Sochi	Reportedly fell off a cliff while hiking to Achipse Fortress.
Alexander Subbotin	43	Board member of Lukoil	8 May 2022	1	(Russia) Basement of Aleksei Pindyurin's residence in Moscow	Reportedly arrived at the residence under the influence of alcohol and drugs to participate in a ritual intended to relieve the hangover, and then died of a heart attack, though critics allege toad poison.
June
Alexei Ogarev	64	Former senior Kremlin official, diplomat, arms dealer and oil business executive	16 June 2022	1	Rublevka, Russia	Found dead.
Yevgeniy Palant	47	Telephone mogul and philanthropist	27 June 2022	2	Zarechye, Russia	Found dead together with his wife Olga with multiple stab wounds.
July
Yuri Voronov	61	CEO of Astra Shipping, a subcontractor of Gazprom	4 July 2022	1	(Russia) Swimming pool of a residence in Leningrad Oblast	Gunshot wounds to the head, pistol found next to his body.
August
Dan Rapoport	52	Businessman	14 August 2022	1	2400 M Street NW, Washington, D.C., United States	Found in the street after an apparent fall from his high rise apartment building.
September
Ravil Maganov	67	Chair of Lukoil	1 September 2022	1	(Russia) Below a window of the Kremlin Hospital, Moscow	Reportedly hospitalised for heart problems and depression, then "fell out of a window".
Ivan Pechorin	39	Director of Aviation of the Russian Far East and Arctic Development Corporation (KRDV)	10 September 2022	1	(Russia) On a beach in Beregovoy, Amur Oblast	Drowned at Cape Ignatyev, Vladivostok; body found washed up in Beregovoy two days later; allegedly fell from his boat.
Vladimir Sungorkin [ru]	68	Editor-in-chief of Komsomolskaya Pravda	14 September 2022	1	(Russia) Roshchino, Khabarovsky District, Khabarovsk Krai	Reportedly suffered a stroke and suffocated while on the way to lunch, his deputy would die a year later.
Anatoly Gerashchenko	72	Former Head of the Moscow Aviation Institute	21 September 2022	1	(Russia) Stairway within the Moscow Aviation Institute	Reportedly fell down a flight of stairs inside the institute.
Pavel Pchelnikov	52	Director of Digital Logistics, a Russian Railways subsidiary	28 September 2022	1	(Russia) On the balcony of an apartment in Moscow	Allegedly shot himself on the balcony of his apartment.
October
Nikolay Petrunin	46	Deputy of the State Duma	12 October 2022	1	(Russia) Unnamed hospital in Moscow	Alleged complications of COVID-19.
November
Colonel Vadim Boyko	44	Deputy head of the Makarov Pacific Higher Naval School, involved in mobilization efforts	16 November 2022	1	(Russia) Office at Makarov Pacific Higher Naval School, Vladivostok	Reportedly died by suicide after shooting himself in the chest five times.
Vyacheslav Taran	53	Co-founder of Libertex, a cryptocurrency and foreign exchange market company	25 November 2022	1	Villefranche-sur-Mer, French Riviera, France	Died in helicopter crash after taking off from Switzerland.
Vladimir Makei (Belarus)	64	Foreign Minister of Belarus (2012–2022)	26 November 2022	1	Unknown, likely Minsk, Belarus	Reported to have died four days after returning from a Collective Security Treaty Organization summit in Armenia accompanying representatives of Vladimir Putin. He was said by his friends to have been "painfully upset" by the collapse of the course he was leading.
December
Grigory Kochenov	41	Creative Director of Agima, an IT company	7 December 2022	1	(Russia) Volodarsky Street, Nizhny Novgorod	Reportedly fell to his death from his balcony while officials from the Investigative Committee executed a search warrant for his apartment.
Dmitriy Zelenov	50	Co-founder of Donstroy, a construction company	9 December 2022	1	Antibes, French Riviera, France	Reportedly felt ill and fell over a railing and hit his head, later died in hospital without regaining consciousness.
Alexander Lapin		Former head of Krasnoyarsk’s landscaping and green construction authority	11 December 2022	1	the Investigative Committee office in Krasnoyarsk, Russia	Fell from a seventh-floor window of an Investigative Committee office during questioning in a corruption case, with security footage said to show him sitting on the windowsill before the fall.
Vladimir Bidenov	61	Business associate and travel companion of Pavel Antov	22 December 2022	1	Hotel Sai International, Rayagada, Odisha, India	Died of heart problems; two days later his close companion, Pavel Antov, also died at the same hotel under suspicious circumstances.
Alexander Buzakov	66	Director General of the Admiralty Shipyards	24 December 2022	1	(Russia) Saint Petersburg	Died suddenly the day after he attended the float-out ceremony of the new Lada class submarine Velikie Luki. No explanation was given on the cause of death.
Pavel Antov	65	Founder of Vladmirsky Standart, a meat processing company, and deputy (member) of the Legislative Assembly of Vladimir Oblast	24 December 2022	1	Below a window of Hotel Sai International, Rayagada, Odisha, India	Fell out of window from Hotel Sai International; another Russian colleague, Vladimir Bidenov, died in the same hotel two days prior.
Alexei Maslov	69	Former Commander-in-Chief of the Russian Ground Forces and special representative of Uralvagonzavod.	24 December 2022	1	(Russia) Burdenko Main Military Clinical Hospital, Moscow	Died "unexpectedly" in a military hospital, no cause given.
Vladimir Nesterov	73	Director General of the Khrunichev State Research and Production Space Center	28 December 2022	1	Unknown	

=== 2023 ===
2023 Deaths
_{2} / _{3} / _{0} / _{1} / _{1} / _{5} / _{5} / _{11} / _{0} / _{1} / _{2} / _{3}; Jan / Feb / Mar / Apr / May / Jun / Jul / Aug / Sep / Oct / Nov / Dec	Total: 34

Name	Age at death	Position	Date of death	Count of deaths	Place body was discovered	Circumstances
January
Magomed Abdulaev	61	Former Chairman of the Government of the Republic of Dagestan	5 January 2023	1	(Russia) Makhachkala, Dagestan	Died at a hospital after being hit by a car while crossing a street.
Dmitry Pavochka	49	Former manager of Roscosmos, Sukhoi, Lukoil, Bank Menatep and Russdragmet, while presently or formerly involved with many others.	26 January 2023	1	(Russia) 17th floor of a building on Leningradsky Avenue, Moscow	Burned alive after falling asleep with a lit cigarette.
February
Vladimir Makarov	72	Former Deputy Chief of the Russian Interior Ministry’s Main Directorate for Combating Extremism.	13 February 2023	1	(Russia) At his suburban home northwest of Moscow	State-run TASS news agency reported him found dead, in an apparent suicide, following his dismissal by President Vladimir Putin.
Marina Yankina	58	Head of Finance and Procurement of the Western Military District	16 February 2023	1	(Russia) House on Zamshina Street, St. Petersburg	Found dead after falling from a window on the 16th-floor of a high-rise building.
Viatcheslav Rovneiko	59	Oil magnate, co-founder of Urals Energy, co-owner of Belgian oil company Nafta (B) NV, director of Interregional Fuel Union; ex-KGB spy.	22 February 2023	1	(Russia) Unspecified gated village near Moscow	Found unconscious in his house; subsequent medical help could not save his life.
April
Igor Shkurko	49	Deputy director of Yakutskenergo.	4 April 2023	1	(Russia) Pre-trial detention center in Yakutsk	Found dead in his cell; allegedly suicide.
May
Pyotr Kucherenko	46	State Secretary and Deputy Minister of Science and Higher Education of the Russian Federation	20 May 2023	1	(Russia) Mineralnye Vody Airport, Stavropol Krai	Died after falling ill on board a flight from Cuba to Russia.
June
Yuri Demin	62	Former head of the State Inspectorate for Road Safety for the Sverdlovsk Oblast	4 June 2023	1	(Russia) Sysert, Sverdlovsk Oblast	Found dead after falling from the second floor of his dacha during construction work.
Artyom Bartenev	42	Federal Judge of the Kirovsky District Court	8 June 2023	1	(Russia) Underneath his apartment in Kazan, Tatarstan	Found dead after falling 12 stories from his apartment window.
Anatoly Beryozikov	40	Anti-war activist	14 June 2023	1	(Russia) In his cell in Rostov-on-Don	He was in custody for minor offenders, scheduled to be released. Had his ribs broken, stun gun bruises. Died reportedly from suicide.
Grigory Klinishov	92	Physicist and co-creator of the Soviet hydrogen bomb RDS-37.	17 June 2023	1	(Russia) Inside his apartment in Moscow	Found dead in his apartment from an apparent suicide, leaving a note.
Kristina Baikova	28	Vice-president of Loko-Bank, head of department for work with corporate clients.	24 June 2023	1	(Russia) Underneath her apartment in Khodynsky Boulevard, Moscow	Fell off her apartment at the 11th floor; circumstances of the incident have not yet been clarified.
July
Andrei Fomin	57	Prosecutor of Chuvashia (since 2020)	1 July 2023	1	(Russia) In the Volga river near Cheboksary	Fell ill while swimming in the Volga river and drowned.
Aleksey Avramenko (Belarus)	46	Minister of Transport and Communications of Belarus (since 2019)	4 July 2023	1	Unknown	Died suddenly.
Alexander Nikolayev [ru]	72	Former Consul General of Russia to Crimea, and former Ambassador of Russia to Bangladesh	July 2023	1	(Russia) Konakovo, Tver Oblast	Beaten up near his home and died three weeks later.
Natalia Bochkareva	44	Daughter of former Governor of Penza Oblast Vasily Bochkarev. Managed her family's lumber-processing and bakery businesses	14 July 2023	1	(Russia) Moscow	Found dead inside her apartment.
Anton Cherepennikov	40	Billionaire owner and head of state-affiliated company Citadel specializing in digital wiretapping equipment and telecommunications monitoring technology, sanctioned by the US in February 2023	22 July 2023	1	(Russia) Moscow	Found dead in his office.
August
Gennady Lopyrev	69	Former lieutenant-general in the Federal Protective Service and overseer of construction projects including Putin's palace.	16 August 2023	1	(Russia) IK-3 prison colony, Ryazan Oblast	Imprisoned in the IK-3 prison in 2017 for taking bribes, charges he denied in 2016. Died of leukemia two days after diagnosis. News agencies reported no previous signs of the illness.
Yevgeny Prigozhin	62	Russian oligarch, mercenary, Wagner Group co-founder and leader, and former close confidant of Russian president Vladimir Putin until he launched a brief rebellion on 23 June 2023, exactly two months prior.	23 August 2023	10	(Russia) Kuzhenkino, Bologovsky District, Tver Oblast	See also: 2023 Wagner Group plane crash An Embraer Legacy 600 business jet with registration number RA-02795 crashed during a regular high-altitude flight from Moscow to Saint Petersburg. Prigozhin, Utkin, and Chekalov were killed along with two Wagner veterans, two bodyguards, and the three flight staff. According to Wagner Group, the plane was shot down by air defenses, however according to the US government and aviation experts, the plane was downed by a bomb onboard or other sabotage.
Dmitry Utkin	53	Former special forces officer in the GRU, co-founder of Wagner Group, recipient of four Orders of Courage of Russia.	23 August 2023	10	(Russia) Kuzhenkino, Bologovsky District, Tver Oblast	See also: 2023 Wagner Group plane crash An Embraer Legacy 600 business jet with registration number RA-02795 crashed during a regular high-altitude flight from Moscow to Saint Petersburg. Prigozhin, Utkin, and Chekalov were killed along with two Wagner veterans, two bodyguards, and the three flight staff. According to Wagner Group, the plane was shot down by air defenses, however according to the US government and aviation experts, the plane was downed by a bomb onboard or other sabotage.
Valery Chekalov	47	Russian Navy veteran, Wagner Group's head of security and foreign logistics that managed several front companies to coordinate activities in Libya and Syria.	23 August 2023	10	(Russia) Kuzhenkino, Bologovsky District, Tver Oblast	See also: 2023 Wagner Group plane crash An Embraer Legacy 600 business jet with registration number RA-02795 crashed during a regular high-altitude flight from Moscow to Saint Petersburg. Prigozhin, Utkin, and Chekalov were killed along with two Wagner veterans, two bodyguards, and the three flight staff. According to Wagner Group, the plane was shot down by air defenses, however according to the US government and aviation experts, the plane was downed by a bomb onboard or other sabotage.
October
Vladimir Nekrasov	66	Chairman of Lukoil	October	1		Died of acute heart failure.
November
Vladimir Sviridov	68	Former lieutenant-general of the 6th Air and Air Defence Forces Army	November 2023	2	(Russia) Andzhievsky, Stavropol Krai	Found dead at home with his wife.
December
Anna Tsavera	35	Deputy editor-in-chief of Komsomolskaya Pravda	"early" December	1	(Russia) Moscow	Found dead in her apartment, her boss Vladimir Sungorkin died suddenly the year prior.
Evgeny Postrigan	50	Chief accountant at sanctioned Information Satellite Systems Reshetnev	December 2023	1	(Russia) Zheleznogorsk, Siberia	Found dead at the garage of his property, cause of death asphyxiation.
Vladimir Egorov	46	Deputy of the Tobolsk City Duma	27 December 2023	1	(Russia) Tobolsk, Tyumen Oblast	Found dead in the yard of his home from suspected three-story fall from building.

=== 2024 ===
2024 Deaths
_{3} / _{4} / _{1} / _{0} / _{1} / _{2} / _{2} / _{0} / _{1} / _{1} / _{2} / _{0}; Jan / Feb / Mar / Apr / May / Jun / Jul / Aug / Sep / Oct / Nov / Dec	Total: 17

Name	Age at death	Position	Date of death	Count of deaths	Place body was discovered	Circumstances
January
Zoya Konovalova	48	Editor-in-chief of the State Television and Radio Broadcasting Company Kuban	5 January 2024	2	(Russia) Krasnodar Krai	Died alongside her ex-husband in a suspected poisoning incident.
Alexander Rybin	39	Russian journalist; freelanced for pro-Kremlin media while also working for pro-democratic platform Rabkor.	6 January 2024	1	(Russia) Shakhty	Body was found near a highway.
February
Ivan Sechin	35	Employee of Rosneft. Son and heir apparent of Rosneft CEO Igor Sechin	5 February 2024	1	(Russia) Moscow	Complained of kidney pain at his home mansion overnight and died within hours after ambulances failed to arrive in time, due to the security service providing the wrong address. Cause of death officially diagnosed as a blood clot. His father, Igor Sechin, blamed the Rosneft security service. The Daily Beast called it "bizarre circumstances".
Maxim Kuzminov	28	Pilot	13 February 2024	1		After defecting to Ukraine, he was shot dead in Spain.
Alexei Navalny	47	Russian opposition leader and anti-corruption activist	16 February 2024	1	(Russia) Kharp Yamalia	Federal Penitentiary Service stated that he had died in prison in Yamalo-Nenets in Western Siberia after taking a walk and feeling unwell that morning.
Andrey Morozov ("Murz")	44	Military blogger and war correspondent, former military combatant	21 February 2024	1		After posting about Russian casualties in the Battle of Avdiivka to his Telegram channel, Morozov deleted the post, claiming to be under orders by military command. The next day, he posted a suicide note blaming Vladimir Solovyov and killed himself by firearm.
March
Vitaly Robertus	53	Vice president of Lukoil	13 March 2024	1	(Russia) Moscow	Reportedly committed suicide. He was found hanged in his Moscow office on 13 March 2024.
May
Aleksandr Surikov	68	Ambassador of Russia to Mozambique	11 May 2024	1	(Mozambique) Maputo	Found dead at his home. Russian authorities denied a request for an autopsy from Maputo Central Hospital. An unsubstantiated report from the Ministry of Foreign Affairs via TASS listed the preliminary cause of death as a stroke.
June
Natalia Larina	50	Former judge of Moscow’s Tagansky District Court, involved in high-profile political cases	5 June 2024	1	(Russia) Moscow	Found dead after falling from her apartment in a high-rise building in Moscow 2024.
July
Valentina Bondarenko	82	Economist at the Institute of Economics of the Russian Academy of Sciences	23 July 2024	1	(Russia) Moscow	Found dead after falling out of the window of her Moscow-area apartment building.
Georgy Chibisov	44	Marketing Director of the Moscow Exchange	27 July 2024	1	(Russia) Moskva river near Moscow	Found drowned in the river after falling off of a cruise ship while trying to use its diving platform alone.
September
Victoria Roshchyna (Ukraine)	27	Ukrainian freelance journalist for Ukrainska Pravda, Radio Free Europe, and Hromadske. Reported on the Russian invasion of Ukraine and the Siege of Mariupol.	19 September 2024	1	Russia	Died in Russian detention, reportedly while being transferred to Moscow from a prison in Taganrog as part of a prisoner swap.
October
Mikhail Rogachev	64	Former vice president of Yukos, former executive director of ONEXIM Group, former deputy general director of Norilsk Nickel	20 October 2024	1	(Russia) Moscow	Found dead after falling out of the window of his Moscow-area apartment building.
November
Alexei Zimin	52	TV Chef and restaurant owner	12 November 2024	1	(Serbia) Belgrade	Found dead in his hotel room. Zimin had previously criticised Russia's annexation of Crimea in 2014 and its invasion of Ukraine in 2022. He spent his final years exiled in the UK.
Vladimir Shklyarov	39	Ballet dancer	16 November 2024	1	(Russia) Saint Petersburg	Fell from the fifth floor of his apartment building, reportedly trying to escape from his apartment. In 2022, he had strongly criticized Putin's war in Ukraine in a social media post.

=== 2025 ===
2025 Deaths
_{0} / _{2} / _{1} / _{0} / _{0} / _{0} / _{3} / _{2} / _{4} / _{1} / _{0} / _{0}; Jan / Feb / Mar / Apr / May / Jun / Jul / Aug / Sep / Oct / Nov / Dec	Total: 13

Name	Age at death	Position	Date of death	Count of deaths	Place body was discovered	Circumstances
February
Artur Priakhin	56	Head of the Federal Antimonopoly Service in the republic of Karelia	4 February 2025	1	(Russia) Petrozavodsk	Found dead outside his office after having fallen from a fifth-floor window from an unspecified office.
Vadim Stroykin	59	Musician	5 February 2025	1	(Russia) St. Petersburg	Fell from a ninth-floor window of his apartment, while being investigated by security services for donating to the Ukrainian army.
March
Buvaisar Saitiev	49	Former State Duma lawmaker from Dagestan and multiple-time Olympic and World Champion in freestyle wrestling	2 March 2025	1	(Russia) Moscow	Fell from the window of his third-floor apartment on Minskaya Street in Moscow. He reportedly had no visible injuries afterwards, and could not explain what had happened to him. On March 2, Saitiev was reported dead in a Moscow hospital after being admitted with fractures to his pelvis, ribs, and spine. Early medical assessments considered possible poisoning, while some reports suggested he had lung disease and used strong painkillers, with death potentially resulting from cardiac arrest due to intoxication.
July
Andrei Badalov	62	A vice president of Russian oil pipeline company Transneft	4 July 2025	1	(Russia) Moscow	Badalov's body was found below a window in front of a house in Rublyovka. Russian police classified the death as a suicide.
Roman Starovoyt	53	Russian Minister of Transport, dismissed on the same day	Before 7 July 2025	1	(Russia) Moscow	According to the Russian media, quoted by Reuters, Starovoyt "has shot himself".
Andrey Korneichuk	42	Federal Agency for Rail Transport official	7 July 2025	1	(Russia) Moscow	Russian state media reported that Korneichuk possibly died from "acute heart failure" while in his office.
September
Alexey Sinitsyn		CEO of potash producer K-Potash Service	8 September 2025	1	(Russia) Solnechnoye, Kaliningrad	Sinitsyn's decapitated body was found under a bridge in Kaliningrad Oblast. According to RIA Novosti, his body had a tow rope attached to it.
Alexander Tyunin	50	General director of NPK Khimprominzhiniring, a subsidiary of the state-owned nuclear giant Rosatom	19 September 2025	1	(Russia) Kokoshkino, Moscow	Tyunin's body was found besides a hunting rifle and a note in a road in Kokoshkino. Russian police reported his death as a suicide.
Alexander Fedotov	49	Former chairman of the Committee on Transportation Infrastructure Development of St Petersburg	24 September 2025	1	(Russia) Sheremetyevo International Airport, Moscow	His body was found below the window of a hotel room at Sheremetyevo Airport, with suicide suspected as the cause of death.
Vitaly Kapustin	43	Local deputy in the Krasnodar region’s Tikhoretsky District Council	25 September 2025	1	(Russia) Novorozhdestvenskaya, Krasnodar Krai	Kapustin was found hanged in a tree from a cable connected to his SUV, his hands were tied behind his back.
October
Vyacheslav Leontyev	87	Former head of the Pravda publishing house	5 October 2025	1	(Russia) Moscow	Alleged fall from a window of his apartment on the fifth floor.

=== 2026 ===
2026 Deaths
_{2} / _{1} / _{0} / _{1} / _{0} / _{1} / _{0} / _{0} / _{0} / _{0} / _{0} / _{0}; Jan / Feb / Mar / Apr / May / Jun / Jul / Aug / Sep / Oct / Nov / Dec	Total: 5

Name	Age at death	Position	Date of death	Count of deaths	Place body was discovered	Circumstances
January
Lyubov Strelkova	39	Clothing entrepreneur	20 January 2026	1	Cyprus	Died of pneumonia. Strelkova was the partner of Alexander Sheromov, who died six days later in Barcelona.
Alexander Sheromov	44	Founder of the Perm-Drug-city-free fund	26 January 2026	1	(Spain) Barcelona	Cause of death unknown. Sheromov was the partner of Lyubov Strelkova, who died six days earlier in Cyprus.
February
Sergei Tropin	72	Former Russian Deputy Justice Minister	6 February 2026	1	(Russia) Western Moscow	Died in the bathroom of his apartment with no indications of a violent death, having allegedly drowned.
June
Semyon Skrepetsky	44	Artist and satirist	15 June 2026	1	(Poland) Biała Podlaska	Shot and killed in a Polish parking lot three days after holding a one-man anti-Putin protest in Berlin. Semyon was highly critical of Russia's government.

== See also ==
- Human rights in the Soviet Union
- List of journalists killed in Russia
- List of Russian assassinations
- List of Russian assassination attempts since 2022
- List of Russian generals killed during the Russian invasion of Ukraine
- List of Soviet assassinations
- Poison laboratory of the Soviet secret services
- Political prisoners in Russia
- Political repression in the Soviet Union
- Russian apartment bombings
- Russian military commissariats attacks
- Russian mystery fires
- Terrorism in Russia

Assassinations and assassination attempts

- Assassination attempts on Volodymyr Zelenskyy
- Assassination of Anna Politkovskaya (7 October 2006)
- Poisoning of Alexander Litvinenko (1 November 2006)
- Murder of Yuriy Chervochkin (22 November 2007)
- Assassination of Boris Nemtsov (27 February 2015)
- Assassination of Pavel Sheremet (20 July 2016)
- Shooting of Denis Voronenkov (23 March 2017)
- Assassination of Maksym Shapoval (27 June 2017)
- Poisoning of Sergei and Yulia Skripal (4 March 2018)
- Poisoning of Pyotr Verzilov (12 September 2018)
- Poisoning of Alexei Navalny (20 August 2020)
