= Defenestration =

Act of throwing someone out of a window

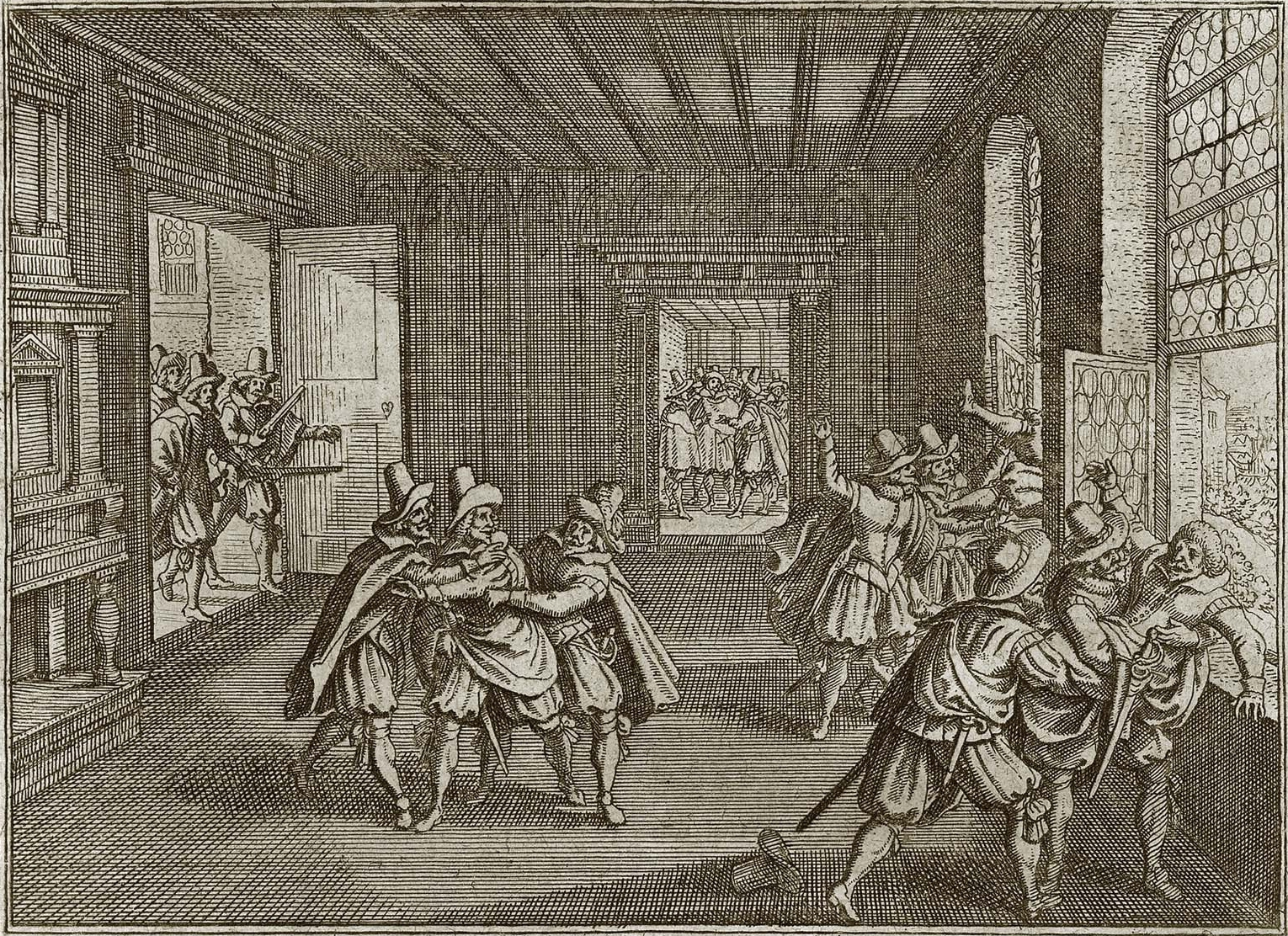
Matthäus Merian's impression of the 1618 Defenestration of Prague

Defenestration (from Neo-Latin de fenestrā) is the act of throwing someone or something out of a window. The term was coined around the time of an incident in Prague Castle in the year 1618 which became the spark that started the Thirty Years' War. This was done in "good Bohemian style", referring to the defenestration which had occurred in Prague's New Town Hall almost 200 years earlier (July 1419), and on that occasion led to the Hussite war. The word comes from the Neo-Latin de- (down from) and fenestra (window or opening).

By extension, the term is also used to describe the forcible or summary removal of an adversary.

== Origin ==
The term originates from two incidents in history, both occurring in Prague. In 1419, seven town officials were thrown from the New Town Hall, precipitating the Hussite War. In 1618, two Imperial governors and their secretary were tossed from the Prague Castle, sparking the Thirty Years' War. These incidents, particularly that in 1618, were referred to as the Defenestrations of Prague and gave rise to the term and the concept.

The word itself is derived from Neo-Latin defenestratio; with dē meaning "out" + fenestra meaning "window" + -atio as a suffix indicating an action or process.

== Notable cases ==
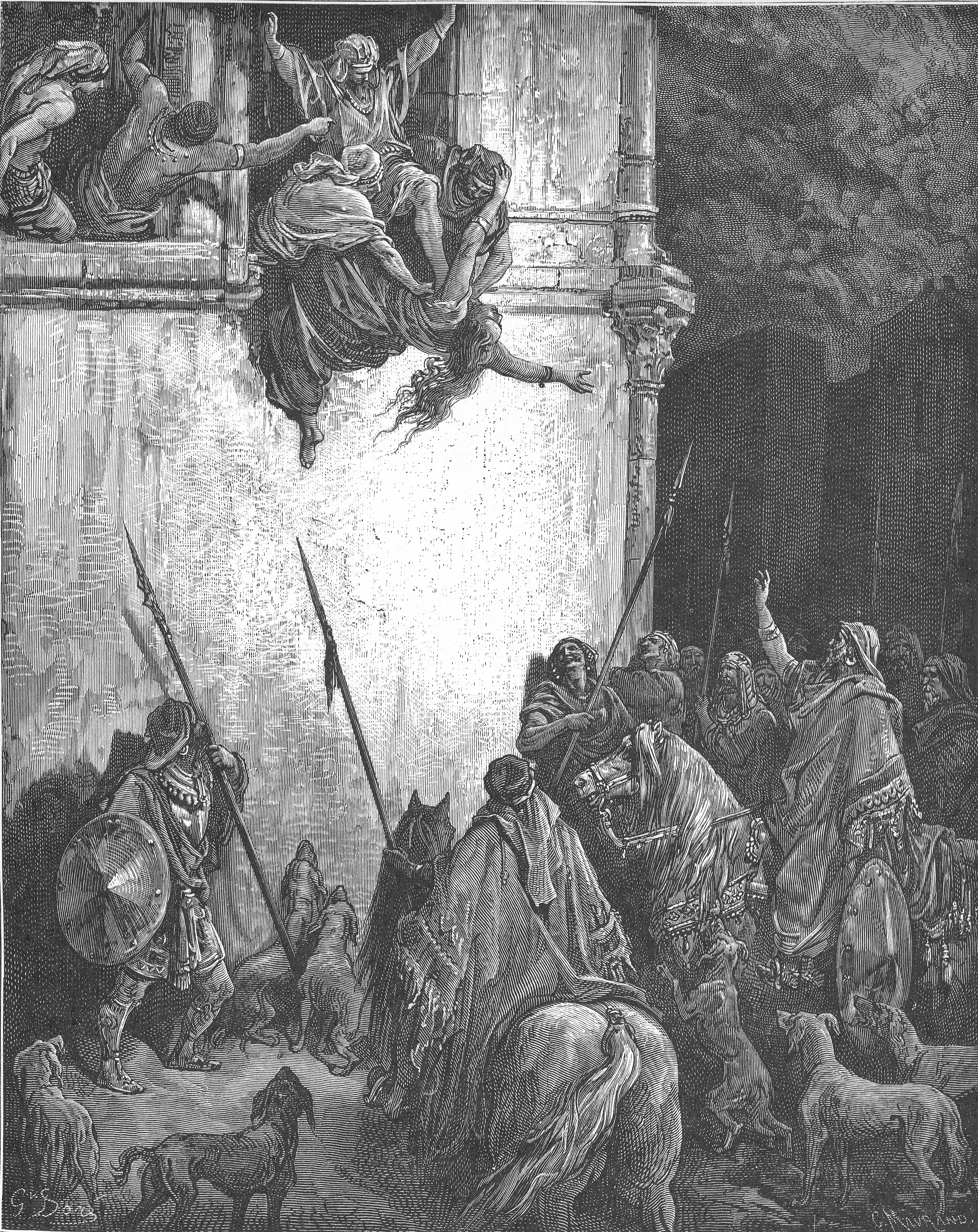
The defenestration of the Biblical Queen Jezebel at Jezreel, by Gustave Doré

- Around the 9th century BC, Queen Jezebel was defenestrated by her own eunuch servants, at the urging of Jehu, according to the Hebrew Bible. (2 Kings 9:33)
- Several chronicles (notably the Annals of Westhide Abbey) note that King John killed his nephew, Arthur of Brittany, by defenestration from the castle at Rouen, France, in 1203.
- In 1378, the guilds and their leader Wouter van der Leyen occupied the Leuven city hall and seized the Leuven government. Most of the patricians left the city and fled to Aarschot. After negotiations between the parties, they agreed to share the government. The patricians did not accept this easily, as it caused them to lose their absolute power. In an attempt to regain absolute control, they had Wouter Van der Leyen assassinated in Brussels. Seeking revenge, the guilds handed over the patricians to a furious crowd. The crowd stormed the city hall and defenestrated the patricians. At least 15 patricians were killed.

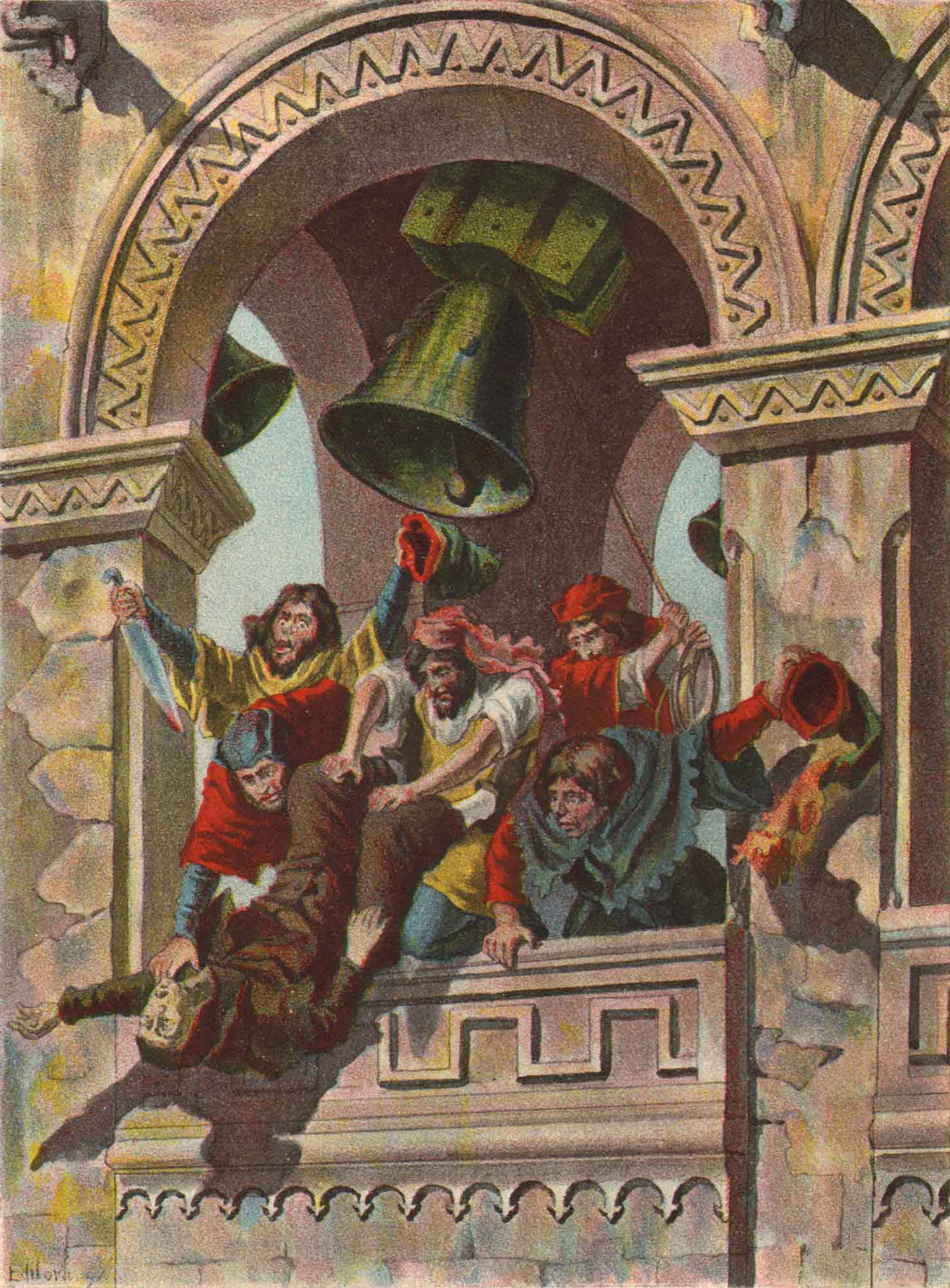
The Bishop of Lisbon D. Martinho de Zamora is thrown by the revolted populace from the cathedral's bell tower, as depicted by Roque Gameiro, in 1904.

- In 1383, to celebrate the acclamation of King John I of Portugal, all churches of the realm were ordered to ring their bells. However, upon the lack of any ringing coming from the capital's cathedral the populace of Lisbon revolted and rammed their way inside the building. Bishop Dom Martinho of Zamora was accused of treason by the populace for being Castilian and supporting Antipope Clement VII and was, therefore, defenestrated from one of the bell towers. His corpse was assaulted and dragged to Rossio Square, where it was left to rot and be eaten by dogs, until the populace had enough of its smell and buried it in the square.
- In 1419, In the First Defenestration of Prague, a judge, the burgomaster, and some thirteen members of the town council of the New Town of Prague were defenestrated by a Hussite mob.
- In 1452, King James II of Scotland murdered William Douglas, 8th Earl of Douglas, with his own hands and defenestrated him at Stirling Castle.
- On April 26, 1478, after the failure of the Pazzi conspiracy to murder the ruler of Florence, Lorenzo de' Medici, Jacopo de' Pazzi was defenestrated.
- In 1483, Prague's Old-Town portreeve and the bodies of seven murdered New-Town aldermen were defenestrated.

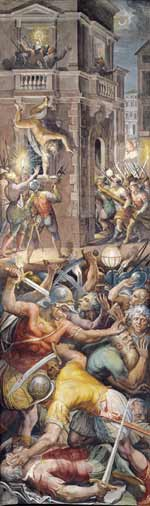
Giorgio Vasari's impression of the St. Bartholomew's Day massacre

- On May 16, 1562, Adham Khan, Akbar's general and foster brother, was defenestrated twice for murdering a rival general, Ataga Khan, who had been recently promoted by Akbar. Akbar was woken up in the tumult after the murder. He struck Adham Khan down personally with his fist and immediately ordered his defenestration by royal order. The first time, his legs were broken as a result of the 12-metre (40-foot) fall from the ramparts of Agra Fort but he remained alive. Akbar, in a rare act of cruelty probably exacerbated by his anger at the loss of his favorite general, ordered his defenestration a second time, killing him. Adham Khan had wrongly counted on the influence of his mother and Akbar's wet nurse, Maham Anga, to save him as she was almost an unofficial regent in the days of Akbar's youth. Akbar personally informed Maham Anga of her son's death, to which she famously commented, "You have done well." She died 40 days later of acute depression.
- In 1572, French King Charles IX's friend, the Huguenot leader Gaspard de Coligny, was killed in accordance with the wishes of Charles' mother, Catherine de' Medici. Charles allegedly said "then kill them all that no man be left to reproach me". Thousands of Huguenots were killed in the St. Bartholomew's Day massacre after soldiers attacked Coligny in his house, stabbed him, and defenestrated him.
- In 1618, rebel Protestant leaders in Prague defenestrate two Catholic Royal regents and their secretary, who survived the 20-metre (68-foot) fall out of the windows of Prague Castle.
- On December 1, 1640, during the Portuguese Restoration War, in Lisbon, a group of conspirators, who supported the rise of nobleman John, 8th Duke of Braganza to the Portuguese throne invaded Ribeira Palace and found Miguel de Vasconcelos, the hated Portuguese Secretary of state of the Habsburg Philip III, hidden in a closet, shot him and defenestrated him.
- On June 27, 1844, Joseph Smith, founder of the Latter Day Saint movement, died after being shot and pushed out a window of the Carthage Jail in Carthage, Illinois while attempting to escape a mob.
- On June 11, 1903, a group of Serbian army officers murdered and defenestrated King Alexander and Queen Draga.
- In 1922, Italian politician and writer Gabriele d'Annunzio was temporarily crippled after falling from a window, possibly pushed by a follower of Benito Mussolini.
- In March to April 1932, in Ivanovo region of Soviet Union, due to ration cuts and labor intensification measures, strikes and spontaneous assemblies broke out. Ten thousand demonstrators ransacked the party and police buildings with slogans like "Toss the Communists . . . out the window."
- On March 10, 1948, the Czechoslovak minister of foreign affairs Jan Masaryk was found dead in his pyjamas, in the courtyard of the Foreign Ministry below his bathroom window. The initial investigation stated that he took his own life by jumping out of the window, although some believe that he was murdered by the ascendant Communists. A 2004 police investigation into his death concluded that, contrary to the initial ruling, he did not die by suicide, but was defenestrated, most likely by Czechoslovak communists and their Soviet NKVD advisers for his opposition to the February 1948 Communist putsch.
- On May 22, 1949, while a patient at Bethesda Naval Hospital, James Forrestal, the first US Secretary of Defense, died by an alleged suicide from fatal injuries sustained after falling out of a sixteenth-floor window.
- On November 28, 1953, the U.S. biological warfare specialist Frank Olson died after a fall from a hotel window that has been suggested to have been an assassination by the CIA.
- On May 29, 1960, the Turkish physician and politician Namık Gedik who served as the minister of interior during the mid-1950s, died by suicide throwing himself out of a window in Ankara when he was in custody. Gedik was arrested on 27 May 1960 immediately following the military coup along with his colleagues. Some witnesses suggest he was beaten unconscious by a small group of young military officers and subsequently defenestrated.
- In 1962, Communist Party of Spain member Julián Grimau was seemingly tortured and then defenestrated from the premises of the Dirección General de Seguridad in Madrid suffering fractures to the wrists and serious skull injuries, prior to his execution in 1963.
- On April 15, 1966, two suspects in the so-called Bathroom Coup in Sri Lanka, Corporal Tilekawardene and L. V. Podiappuhamy (otherwise known as Dodampe Mudalali), were said by the Criminal Investigations Department (CID) to have jumped to their deaths from the fourth floor of the CID building in the Fort. At the inquest, following receipt of new evidence, the magistrate altered the verdict of suicide to one of culpable homicide. The remainder of the suspects were acquitted.
- In 1968, the son of China's future paramount leader Deng Xiaoping, Deng Pufang, was thrown from a window by Red Guards during the Cultural Revolution. He survived, but became paralyzed.
- In 1969, Italian Anarchist Giuseppe Pinelli was seen falling to his death from a fourth floor window of the Milan police station after being arrested because of claims of his involvement in the Piazza Fontana bombing, of which he was later cleared.
- On March 5, 1969, Atanasio Ndongo Miyone, the Foreign Minister of Equatorial Guinea, fell from a window at the Presidential Palace. While the official account claims this was a suicide attempt, he is widely considered to have been forcibly defenestrated. He died of his wounds on March 26.
- In 1970, Turkish idealist student Ertuğrul Dursun Önkuzu was defenestrated from the third floor of a school by a group of left-wing students in Ankara.
- In 1977, as a result of political backlash against her son Fela Kuti's album Zombie, Funmilayo Ransome-Kuti was thrown from a second-story window during a military raid by one thousand Nigerian soldiers on Kuti's compound, the Kalakuta Republic. The injuries sustained from the fall led Ransome-Kuti to lapse into a coma; she would remain in a coma for more than a year, and eventually succumb to her injuries on 13 April 1978. Ransome-Kuti's death would be commemorated in her son's protest song "Coffin for Head of State".
- The 2000 Ramallah lynching included throwing the (already-dead) body of either Vadim Nurzhitz or Yossi Avrahami out of a second-floor window, after those two Israeli soldiers had been lynched.
- On March 2, 2007, Russian investigative journalist Ivan Safronov, who was researching the Kremlin's covert arms deals, fell to his death from a fifth floor window. Friends and colleagues discounted suicide as a reason, and an investigation was opened looking into possible "incitement to suicide".
- In 2007 in Gaza, gunmen allegedly affiliated with Hamas killed a Fatah supporter by defenestration, an act repeated the next day when a Hamas supporter was defenestrated by alleged supporters of Fatah.
- In 2017, retired French physician and teacher Sarah Halimi was killed in an attack on her home near Paris that ended with her being pushed from a third-floor window. Her death was widely perceived as an example of Islamist terrorism and antisemitism. Her assailant was ruled to be not criminally responsible due to having committed the act in a psychotic episode brought on by his heavy use of cannabis.
- On September 1, 2022, Ravil Maganov, a Russian businessman who criticized the country's invasion of Ukraine, died after falling from a window of a hospital in Moscow on the same day the hospital was visited by Russian president Vladimir Putin. Some people who knew Maganov well said his death was unlikely to have been a suicide, and some media hypothesized a connection with various other suspicious deaths of Russian businesspeople occurring around the same time.
- In October 2024, Mikhail Rogachev, a Russian businessman and former vice president of Yukos, was found dead after falling out of the window of his apartment building.

=== Notable autodefenestrations ===
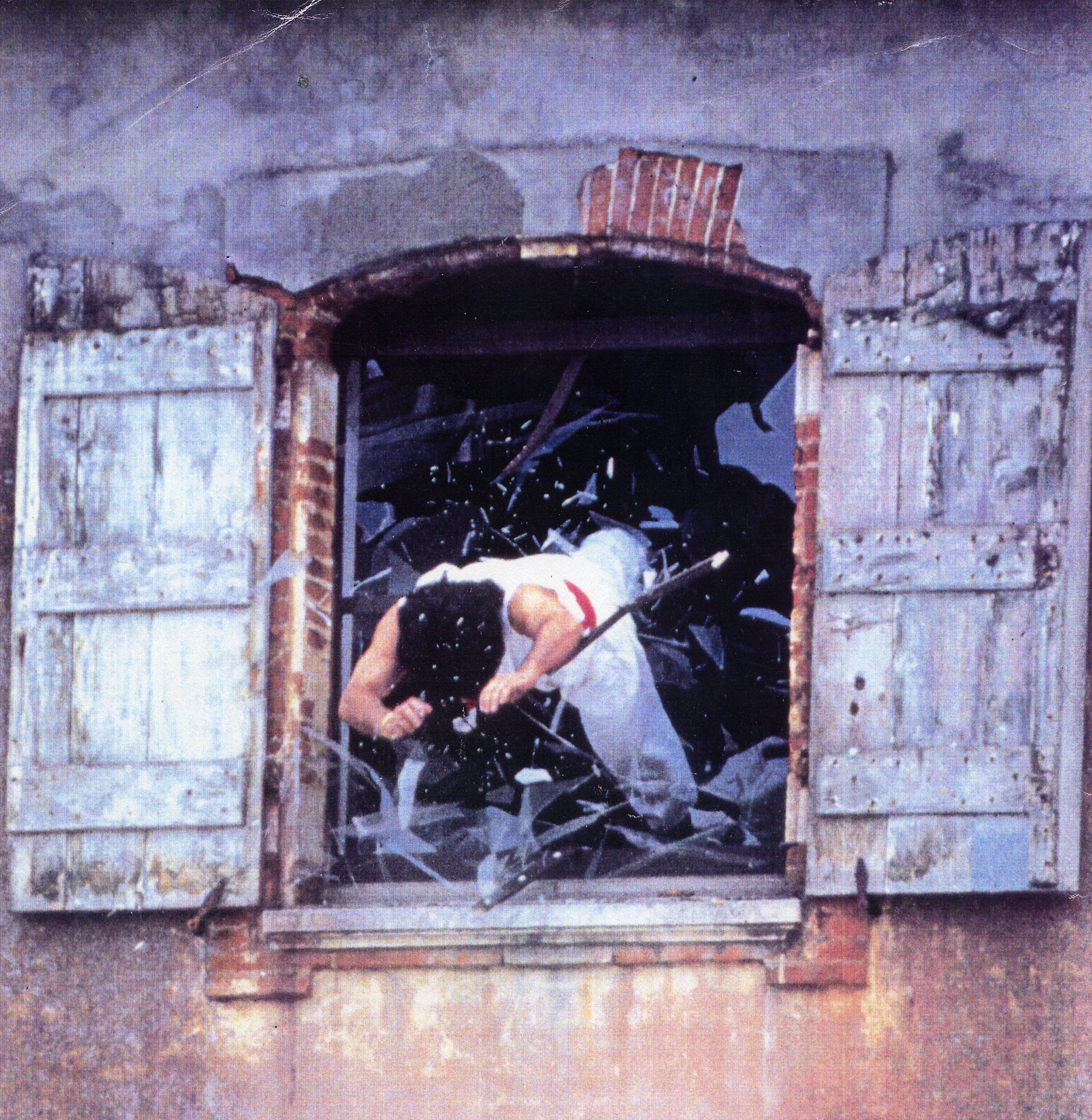
A stuntman diving out a window

Autodefenestration (or self-defenestration) is the term used for the act of jumping, propelling oneself, or causing oneself to fall, out of a window.

- In the Acts of the Apostles in the New Testament, the accidental autodefenestration of a young man of Troas named Eutychus is recorded. The Apostle Paul was travelling to Jerusalem and had stopped for seven days in Troas. While Paul was preaching in a third-story room late on a Sunday night to the local assembly of Christian believers, Eutychus drifted off to sleep and fell out of the window in which he was sitting. The text indicates that Eutychus did not survive but was brought back to life after Paul embraced him. (Acts 20:6–12)
- In December 1840, Abraham Lincoln and four other Illinois legislators jumped out of a window in a political maneuver designed to prevent a quorum on a vote that would have eliminated the Illinois State Bank.
- During the Revolutions of 1848, an agitated crowd forced their way into the town hall in Cologne and two city councilors panicked and jumped out of the window; one of them broke both his legs. The event went down in the city's history as the "Cologne Defenestration".
- In 1961, while being arrested by communist secret service Polish activist Henryk Holland jumped out of window, which led to his death. This event was then widely discussed by dissidents and theories of a possible murder were popular.
- In 1991, British informer Martin McGartland was abducted by members of the Provisional IRA. As he waited to be interrogated, McGartland escaped the IRA by jumping from a third floor window in a Twinbrook flat where he was taken for interrogation following his abduction, and survived the fall.
- On July 9, 1993, the prominent Toronto attorney Garry Hoy fell from a 24th story window in an attempt to demonstrate to a group of new legal interns that the windows of the city's Toronto-Dominion Centre were unbreakable. He performed the same stunt on several previous occasions – dramatically slamming his body against the window – but this time it popped out of its frame and he fell to his death. The accident was commemorated by a 1996 Darwin Award and has been re-enacted in several films and television shows.
- In 1995, the French philosopher Gilles Deleuze jumped from his Paris apartment to his death.
- In 1999, popular German Schlager singer Rex Gildo took his own life by jumping out of the window of his apartment building.
- In 2001, at least 104 people jumped out of the Twin Towers on 9/11.

== In popular culture ==
- In his poem Defenestration, R. P. Lister wrote with amusement about the creation of so exalted a word for so basic a concept. The poem narrates the thoughts of a philosopher undergoing defenestration. As he falls, the philosopher considers why there should be a particular word for the experience, when many equally simple concepts do not have specific names. In an evidently ironic commentary on the word, Lister has the philosopher summarize his thoughts with, "I concluded that the incidence of logodaedaly was purely adventitious."
- There is a range of hacker witticisms referring to "defenestration". For example, the term is sometimes used humorously among Linux users to describe the act of removing Microsoft Windows from a computer.
- The indie video game developer Suspicious Developments has released three games (Gunpoint, Heat Signature, and Tactical Breach Wizards) with a focus on throwing enemies out of windows. After releasing Tactical Breach Wizards in 2024, the developers started referring to these three games as their Defenestration Trilogy.
- In Kingdom Come Deliverance II, one of the main duels ends with a cutscene of Henry of Skalitz pushing the antagonist out of the window to their demise.
- In the final film of the Star Wars prequel trilogy, the Sith Lord Darth Sidious throws Jedi Master Mace Windu out of a window.
- In the season 3 episode 4 of the TV Series Hannibal, character Alana Bloom says in a tragicomic way that she always enjoyed the word "defenestration" and now she get to use it in conversation after being defenestrated.
- In the film series of Friday the 13th, Pamela, Jason, and Tommy have been known to throw bodies (themselves except for Pamela) through windows to scare their victims or outright kill them, such in Friday the 13th Part 3. Known cases are Brenda from Friday the 13th, Jason doing a self-defenestration in Friday the 13th Part 2, Rick's corpse being thrown through the window in Friday the 13th Part 3, Tina moving closer to the window when noticing Terri's bike being parked outside still in Friday the 13th: The Final Chapter, Grandpa George having his eye gouged out after defenestration in Friday the 13th: A New Beginning (the only one done by Tommy), Freddy Krueger being rammed through multiple windows in Freddy vs. Jason, Paula thrown partway through window and then pulled back in by Jason in Friday the 13th Part 6, Friday the 13th Part 7 didn't have a defenestration but the original kill for Robin was to be thrown out of a second floor window but was scrapped by the directors, Charlie after realizing who Jason is in Friday the 13th Part 8 and another self-defenestration through a glass door later in the same film by Jason, Steven getting tackled by Jason through a window in Jason Goes to Hell, there is no defenestration that happens in Jason X nor in Friday the 13th.
- In Batman: Arkham Origins the Joker will kick the Electrocutioner chair a person is in from the Gotham Royal Hotel's penthouse. A case file that the player can do involves the victim being defenestrated. In the Red Hood Story Pack, Black Mask is seen being confronted by Red Hood before being kicked out of a window, it is presumed that Black Mask died from the fall. And in the entire Batman Arkham series, Batman (being controlled by the player) or other playable characters can do a self defenestrated by jumping through the windows at certain areas or can do takeouts called window (replaced with Fear Takeout in Arkham Knight if two or more seen. In Arkham Arkham Knight, Firefly will eject himself out of the three firehouses that are on fire by him, granted it's a semi due to the use of a jetpack and wasn't thrown out but a window and him operating the jetpack still counts.
- Watchmen begins with the killing of The Comedian when he is thrown out of his apartment window, and the story pieces together the events leading up to it.
