= Gunpoint =

Gunpoint is the direction that a gun is pointing. It may also refer to:

- "At gunpoint", under threat from a gun; see Coercion#Physical
- Gunpoint (film), 1966 Western directed by Earl Bellamy starring Audie Murphy
- Gunpoint (video game), 2013 video game

== See also ==
- At Gunpoint, a 1955 American Western film
