= Pavel Antov =

Russian politician (1957–2022)

- Павел Антов

Deputy of Legislative Assembly of Vladimir Oblast
- In office September 2018 – 24 December 2022

Personal details
- Born: 22 December 1957 Voskresensk, Moscow Oblast, Russian SFSR, Soviet Union
- Died: 24 December 2022 (aged 65) Hotel Sai International, Rayagada, Odisha, India
- Cause of death: Defenestration
- Citizenship: Russia
- Party: United Russia
- Children: 1
- Education: S. M. Kirov Military Medical Academy

Pavel Genrikhovich Antov (Russian: Павел Генрихович Антов; 22 December 1957 – 24 December 2022) was a Russian politician and businessman who served as a deputy in the Legislative Assembly of Vladimir Oblast.

In 2019, Forbes Russia listed him as the richest deputy in Russia, and he was listed as the current vice president and minority share-holder of Vladmirsky Standart, a major manufacturer of sausage products in Russia.

Antov died after reportedly falling out of a window at Hotel Sai International in Rayagada in the Indian state of Odisha while on holiday there to celebrate his 65th birthday. His death came just two days after his close friend, businessman Vladimir Bidenov, died at the same hotel from a suspected heart problem.

His death was regarded as suspicious due to him having earlier sent out messages on WhatsApp criticising Russia's attacks on Ukraine during the 2022 invasion, which he had to later retract in June 2022 through a post he made on the VK social media platform. Antov's death is amongst similar suspicious deaths involving Russian businessmen who spoke out against the invasion.

== Biography ==
Antov was born in Voskresensk near Moscow and was a graduate of S. M. Kirov Military Medical Academy in Saint Petersburg.

After graduation, he had to give up on his goal of being a military doctor due to an injury received during service.

In 1985 he moved to the city of Vladimir and worked as a psychiatrist and eventually became a deputy of the district council. He got married and had a daughter named Anechka around the age of 30.

After the collapse of the Soviet Union, the hospital in which he was working closed, and he did various businesses. In the year 2000 he founded "Vladmirsky Standart", a major manufacturer of meat and sausage products. The company's yearly revenue was estimated to be 11.56 billion rubles with a net profit of 553 million rubles by SPARK-Interfax.

As of 2019, he was serving as the vice president of Vladmirsky Standart and was a minority share-holder.

Forbes Ranking

In 2018, Forbes estimated his earnings at 10 billion rubles. In the 2000s, he founded the meat and sausage production group "Vladimirsky Standart". At the time of his death, he owned a 5% stake in the holding’s charter capital.

== Death ==
On 21 December 2022, he along with three other fellow Russian tourists, including his close friend businessman Vladimir Bidenov, checked into Hotel Sai International in Rayagada in the eastern Indian state of Odisha along with their local guide.

On 22 December, Bidenov was found lying unconscious in his hotel room and was taken to the Rayagada district hospital where the doctor declared him dead according to the police.

On 24 December, the body of Bidenov was cremated in Rayagada following approval from the Russian authority in India. On the same day Antov was found dead in a pool of blood outside the hotel they were staying in.

The Odisha Director General of Police Sunil Kumar Bansal stated that the police were uncertain whether Antov fell off accidentally from the hotel window or committed suicide possibly due to being depressed by the death of his friend. He stated that the local police registered an unnatural death case and had launched an investigation while keeping in touch with Russian authority in Kolkata.

On 29 December the death of Pavel Antov, and his companion Vladimir Budanov, is being investigated as criminal cases by Indian Police. Police have “collected medical and other documents, photographs, passports and documents”. A post mortem has shown Mr Antov died from “severe internal injuries”. Indian lawyer and opposition politician Manish Tewari questioned why the bodies were allowed to be cremated. Further commenting: "If you look at the facts, which are available in the public space, they do seem to suggest that people who have been critics of the Ukrainian war have died under rather mysterious circumstances". Earlier, Antov had stated on WhatsApp about the Russian warfare that "It’s extremely hard to call this anything other than terror”.

== See also ==
- 2022 Russian businessmen suspicious deaths
