= Ravil Maganov =

Russian businessman (1954–2022)

- Равиль Маганов
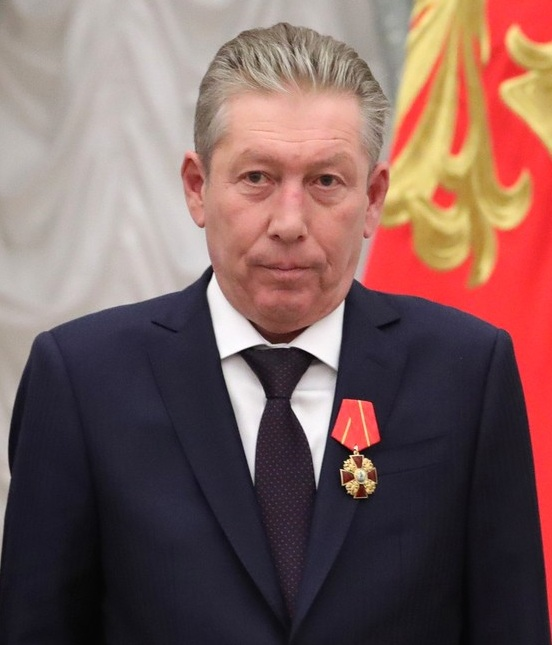
- Maganov in 2019
- Born: 25 September 1954; Almetyevsk, Tatar ASSR, Russian SFSR, Soviet Union
- Died: 1 September 2022 (aged 67); Moscow, Russia
- Cause of death: Defenestration (alleged)
- Occupation: Businessman
- Employer: Lukoil

Ravil Ulfatovich Maganov (Note: Russian: Равиль Ульфатович Маганов, Tatar: Равил Өлфәт улы Мәганов, romanized: Ravil Ölfät Uly Mäganov) (25 September 1954 – 1 September 2022) was a Russian oligarch who was the chairman of the national oil company Lukoil.

== Early life and education ==
Maganov was born in Almetyevsk, Tatar ASSR, in the Soviet Union (now Tatarstan, Russia) on 25 September 1954.

He graduated from the Moscow State University of Oil and Gas in 1977.

His father Ulfat Maganov was the senior engineer of the Almetyevsk field and geophysical office of the Tatneftegeofizika trust, and from 1978 to 1998 he headed the Almetyevsk department of geophysical works. His younger brother Nail is a businessman and politician who is the head of the Russian oil producer Tatneft.

== Career ==
Ravil Maganov joined Lukoil shortly after the company was founded in November 1991. He was a close associate of one Lukoil's founders Vagit Alekperov. According to the company, it was he who imagined and proposed the name Lukoil. He held several management positions (vice president of oil production in 1994, first executive vice president of the company in 2006) and oversaw Lukoil's oil production, refining and exploration. He regularly participated in meetings at the Russian Energy Ministry together with other oil companies ahead of OPEC+ meetings. In 2019, he received the Order of Alexander Nevsky from Russian president Vladimir Putin. He was appointed chairman of the board of directors in 2020.

== Political views ==
Shortly after the Russian invasion of Ukraine started, Lukoil's board of directors, headed by Maganov, issued a statement calling for a quick end to the conflict, describing it as a "tragedy" and expressed sympathy to its victims.

== Death ==
On 1 September 2022, Maganov allegedly "died after falling from a sixth-floor window at the Moscow Central Clinical Hospital". He had reportedly been hospitalized due to a heart attack. Lukoil acknowledged his death in a statement, saying Maganov "passed away following a severe illness". Some media have hypothesized a connection with other 2022 Russian businessmen mystery deaths. Russian state news agency TASS reported the death as a suicide and claimed that he had been taking antidepressants. Two people who knew Maganov well believe that it is unlikely that he committed suicide. Russian news site Baza, which has close ties with the police, suggested that Maganov may have fallen from a balcony while smoking. It also claimed that CCTV footage was not available because cameras had been "turned off for repairs". President Vladimir Putin had visited the hospital to pay respects to Mikhail Gorbachev on the day of Maganov's death.

== See also ==
- Dan Rapoport
- Defenestration
- Suspicious deaths of notable Russians in 2022–2024
