= Heat signature =

Heat signature or "thermal signature" may refer to:

- An alternate term for an infrared signature, the identification of an entity based on thermal-based imaging
- "Heat Signature", a second season episode from the television show Adventure Time
- Heat Signature, a 2017 video game
