= Murder of Ertuğrul Dursun Önkuzu =

1970 murder in Ankara, Turkey

Ertuğrul Dursun Önkuzu
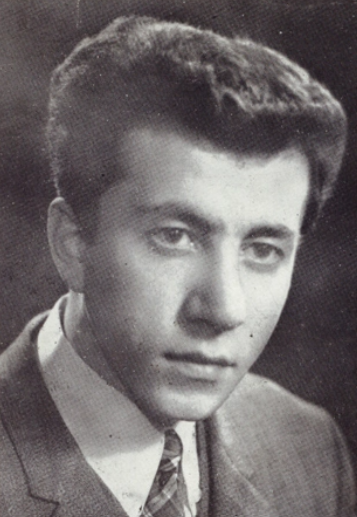
- Born: 1 January 1948; Zile, Tokat
- Died: 23 November 1970 (aged 22); Ankara
- Cause of death: Defenestration
- Resting place: Zile, Tokat
- Known for: Political murder victim

Ertuğrul Dursun Önkuzu (1 January 1948 - 23 November 1970) was a 22-year-old Turkish far-rightist Idealist student from Zile, Tokat. He was studying at the Ankara Technical Higher Male Teacher Training School when he was murdered by far-leftist students on 23 November 1970.

== Incident ==
On 20 November 1970, Önkuzu was kidnapped by a group of far-leftist students in Ankara. On 23 November he was defenestrated from the third floor of his school's dormitory. Some reports claim he was heavily tortured to death for 3 days including cutting his wrists, pumping air through his throat with a bicycle pump until his lungs burst and he was thrown from the window alive. His shroud was stained with blood at his funeral. However, one source stated he died as a result of falling 11 meters, not from torture.

After Önkuzu's murder, 3 left-wing students – Hikmet Parabakan, Abbas Balkır and Sinan Gündüz – were kidnapped by idealists. The three students were hung from the ceiling by their legs, their skin was cut with razor blades, their fingers were broken and Idealists left them in front of a hospital.

== Trials ==
Six people were arrested and convicted related to the incident. They all were released in 1974 as part of a general amnesty.

== See also ==
- Murder of Fırat Çakıroğlu
