= Vadim Boyko =

Russian colonel (died 2022)

Vadim Yevgenyevich Boyko (Russian: Вадим Евгеньевич Бойко) was a colonel in the Russian military and deputy director of the Makarov Pacific Higher Naval School in Vladivostok. Boyko had been responsible for working with Russian soldiers drafted under Putin's September 21 mobilization order during the Russian invasion of Ukraine.

On November 16, Russian media outlet Dalnevostochnie Novosti reported that Boyko had committed suicide in his office. When he was found dead, there were five bullet casings and four pistols next to his body. A post on the Baza Telegram channel stated: "It turns out that the colonel shot himself in the chest five times."

Boyko's death came after several apparent suicide deaths of Russian oligarchs and the disappearance or illness of Russian military men following the invasion of Ukraine.

After Boyko's death was announced, his widow Yulia Boyko claimed he had been threatened with criminal charges and financial penalties for failing to meet his recruitment quota during the mobilization drive. Yulia Boyko asked for President Vladimir Putin to oversee an investigation into Boyko's death.

== See also ==
- Suspicious Russia-related deaths since 2022
