= Murder of Fırat Çakıroğlu =

Turkish crime

Fırat Yılmaz Çakıroğlu
- Born: 1 January 1991; Akşehir, Konya, Turkey
- Died: 20 February 2015 (aged 24); İzmir, Turkey
- Cause of death: Murder by stabbing
- Resting place: Pınarbaşı Cemetery
- Known for: Political murder victim

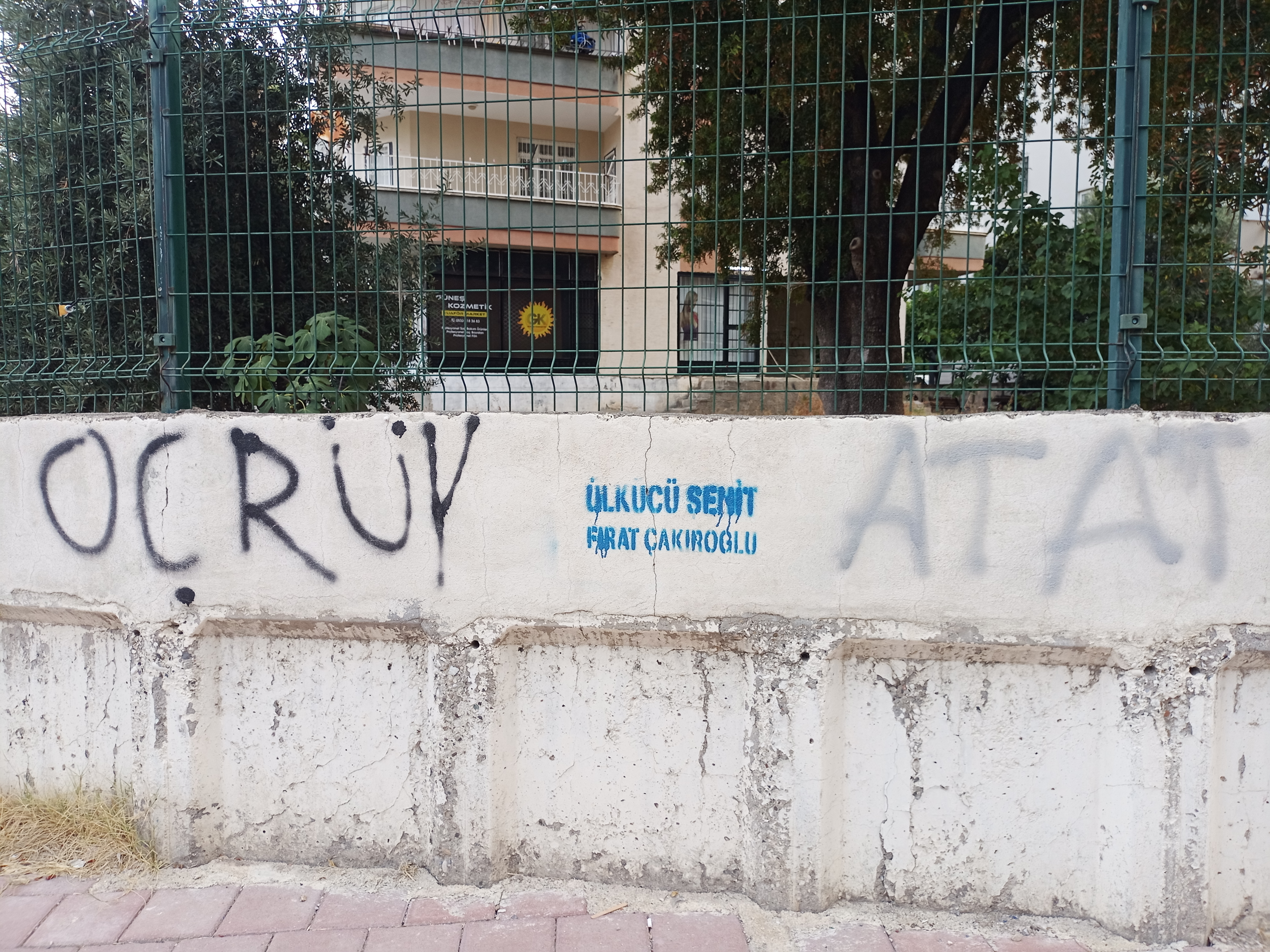
The words "Idealist martyr Fırat Çakıroğlu" written with spray paint on a wall in the Çukurova district of Adana

Fırat Yılmaz Çakıroğlu (1 January 1991 – 20 February 2015) was a 24-year-old Turkish nationalist student from Akşehir, Konya. Fırat Çakıroğlu, A member of the "Ülkü Ocakları" (Ideal Hearths), an organization affiliated with the Nationalist Movement Party (MHP), was injured by left-wing students and later died from blood loss. Ege University student Nurullah Semo was convicted of murder. .

== Incident ==
Çakıroğlu was the leader of the youth branch of the Nationalist Movement Party (MHP) at the Ege University. On 20 February 2015, an argument between right-wing and left-wing students started in Ege University. The argument quickly turned into a fight and eight people from both sides were injured in the incident, three of them needing hospitalisation, including Çakıroğlu. After two hours he died at the hospital of his wounds. Oktay Vural, a parliamentarian of the MHP, blamed members of the PKK for the murder.

== Trials ==
After a 880 day long trial, Nurullah Semo was sentenced to 15 years of imprisonment for "membership in a terrorist organization" and life imprisonment for homicide.

== Legacy ==
After his death, two fitness centers in Tarsus and Menderes, two parks in Nazilli and Aliağa and an intersection in Manisa were named after him. There is also a memorial forest named for Çakıroğlu in Etimesgut.

== See also ==
- Murder of Ertuğrul Dursun Önkuzu
