= Grigory Klinishov =

Russian physicist (1930–2023)

Grigory Yemelyanovich Klinishov (Russian: Григорий Емельянович Клинишов, 30 October 1930 – c. 17 June 2023) was a Soviet Russian physicist and recipient of the Lenin Prize. He was one of the creators of the Soviet hydrogen bomb RDS-37.

== Scientific career ==
Klinishov graduated from the Moscow Engineering Physics Institute in 1954 and held the rank of the Candidate of the Physical and Mathematical Sciences. He was sent to the KB-11 (Constructor Bureau-11) of the Ministry of Medium Machine Building (later called All-Russian Scientific Research Institute of Experimental Physics), a facility tasked with developing nuclear and thermonuclear weapons. There he worked as an engineer in a theoretical department under Andrei Sakharov.

Klinishov developed the charge for the Soviet hydrogen bomb RDS-37. The bomb was tested on 22 November 1955 in Semipalatinsk. Klinishov also developed several types of thermonuclear charges for next-generation bombs.

== Death ==
Klinishov apparently died from suicide, at the age of 92. According to Russian media, his hanged body was found by relatives on 17 June 2023 in his apartment in Moscow. He left a death note where he bid farewell to his relatives. His deaths has been listed among the suspicious deaths of Russian businesspeople and public figures since the beginning of the Russian invasion of Ukraine, colloquially known as "sudden Russian death syndrome".

== See also ==
- Suspicious Russia-related deaths since 2022
