= Vladimir Nesterov =

Russian engineer (1949–2022)

- Native name: Владимир Евгеньевич Нестеров
- Born: Vladimir Yevgenyevich Nesterov; 1 July 1949; Cherepovets, Vologda Oblast, Russian SFSR, Soviet Union
- Died: 28 December 2022 (aged 73)
- Allegiance: Soviet Union; Russia
- Branch: Russian Ground Forces
- Service years: 1972–1992
- Rank: Colonel
- Awards: Order "For Merit to the Fatherland" (4th class; 2009); Order of Honour; Order of the Red Star; Medal "For Impeccable Service" (2nd class); Order "For Merit to the Fatherland" (2nd class); Order of Merit (Ukraine) (3rd class; 2006); State Prize of the Russian Federation (1997); Prize of the Government of the Russian Federation in the field of Science and Technology (2007); Honorary Diploma of the Government of the Russian Federation (2009); Order of St. Sergius of Radonezh

Vladimir Yevgenyevich Nesterov (Russian: Владимир Евгеньевич Нестеров; 1 July 1949 – 28 December 2022) was a Russian engineer who was the former general director of Khrunichev State Research and Production Space Center, one of the world's leading space launch providers.

== Biography ==
Born in Cherepovets, Nesterov graduated from Moscow Aviation Institute in 1972 with a Master's degree in mechanical engineering, and from the Dzerzhinsky Military Academy of Rocket Forces in 1978. He served in the Soviet Army from 1972 to 1992, after which he joined the Russian Space Agency, first serving as a deputy head of Directorate for launch vehicles and ground infrastructure until 2004, and then as the head of the same directorate 2004–2005. On 25 November 2005, he was appointed general director of Khrunichev by a Russian Federation presidential decree.

== See also ==
- Suspicious Russia-related deaths since 2022
