= Richard Percival Lister =

British painter

R. P. Lister FRSL
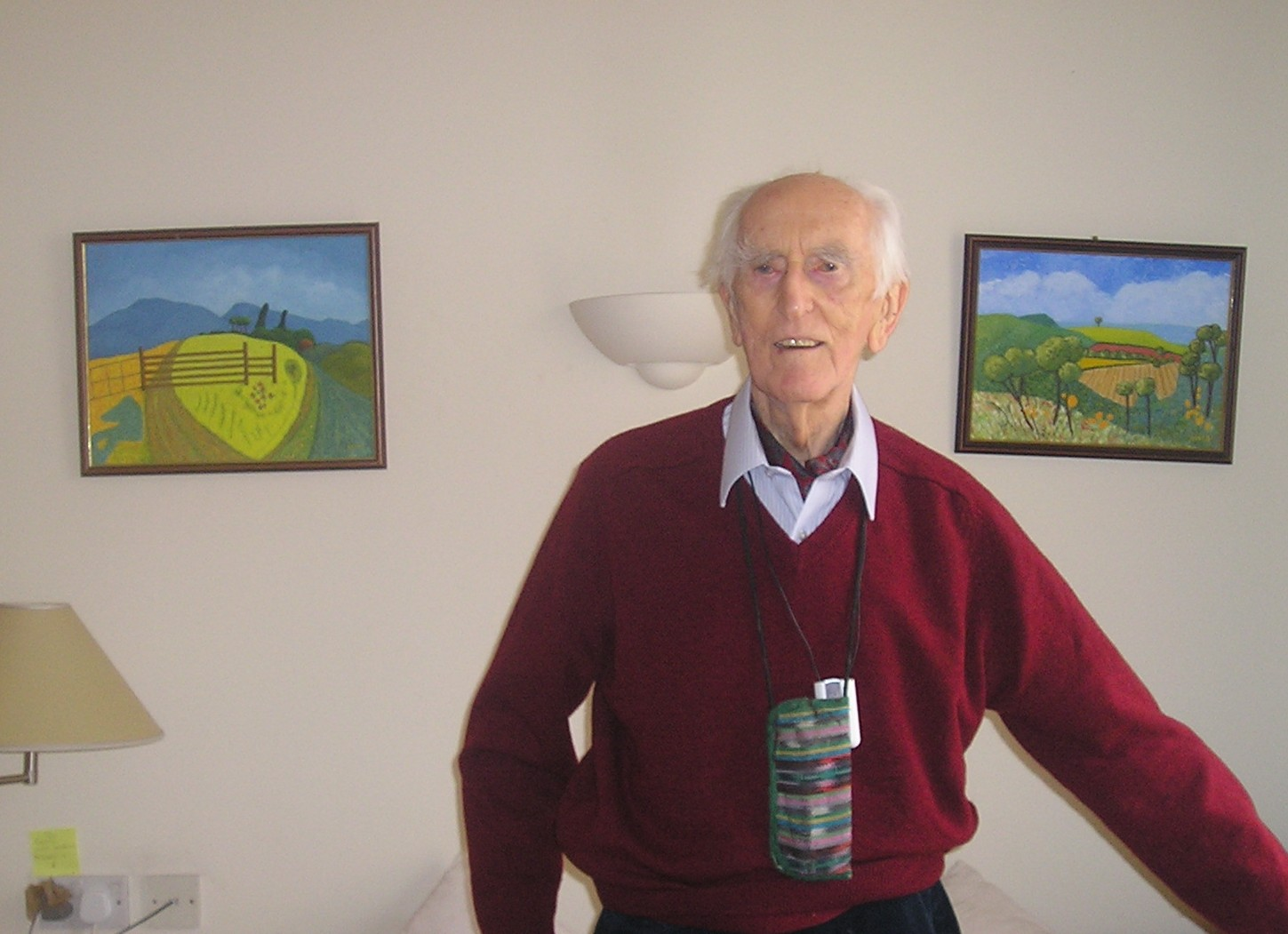
- Lister in his nineties, with some of his paintings
- Born: Richard Percival Lister; 23 November 1914; Nottingham, Nottinghamshire, England
- Occupations: Metallurgist, author, poet, artist

Richard Percival Lister FRSL (23 November 1914 – 1 May 2014) was an English author, poet, artist and metallurgist.

== Background and professional experience through World War II ==
He was born in Nottingham in 1914, and grew up in West Didsbury and the Peak District of Derbyshire, and attended school in New Mills, a Derbyshire town. In the 1930s he obtained a BSc in Metallurgy at Manchester University and worked as a metallurgist at Samuel Fox's steelworks near Sheffield until World War II broke out. During the war he worked in the Royal Naval Torpedo Factory in Greenock in Scotland, the Royal Aircraft Establishment in Farnborough, Hampshire, and the Ministry of Aircraft Production in London. In 1947–1949 he worked in liaison for the British Non-Ferrous Metals Research Association.

== Post-World War II ==
After an earlier marriage to Joyce Ambler, he married Ione Mary Wynniatt-Husey on 24 June 1985; she died in 1989.

Apart from Lister's competence in technological matters, he has subsequently displayed various other talents; in 1950 he abandoned metallurgy for writing, publishing most of his works under the name R. P. Lister. They include prose novels, autobiographical accounts of travel and other experiences, historical works, and poetry, mainly light verse in various forms and idioms. Apart from his writings he later became in effect a professional artist in response to enthusiasm for his paintings. He also engaged in various related employments, such as in 1954–1957, when he worked as general editor at Macdonald & Evans Ltd, Publishers.

== Writings ==
His published writings include:

=== Fiction ===
- The Way Backwards : Collins 1950.
- The Oyster and the Torpedo : Jonathan Cape: London, 1951.
- Rebecca Redfern : Andre Deutsch : London, 1953.
- The Rhyme and the Reason : Victor Gollancz : London, 1963.
- The Questing Beast : Chapman & Hall : London, 1965.
- One Short Summer : Milton House Books : Aylesbury, 1974.

(Note: An entry at Amazon Japan for "Good Wives : Marboro Books 1990" either is an error, or by some other author of that name; R. P. Lister, the subject of this article, disclaimed either authorship or knowledge of any such work.)

=== Verse ===
His output of verse includes several hundred poems published mainly in The New Yorker, Punch, and The Atlantic Monthly (now called The Atlantic). He anthologised some of those works in:

- The Idle Demon. A Collection of Verses : Andre Deutsch: London, 1958.
- Allotments : The Whittington Press : 1985.
- The Albatross : London : Dorricott, 1986.

He wrote and published regularly until the 1980s when he became more active painting, proofreading and editing, until 2010 when he reappeared as the featured poet in Able Muse, Inaugural Print Edition, with interview and some new poems.

=== Travel ===
His books on travel were highly personal, even autobiographical, and he largely illustrated them himself:

- A Journey in Lapland. The Hard Way to Haparanda (illustrations by the author) : Chapman & Hall: London, 1965. (Reprinted by Travel Book Club 1965)
- A Muezzin from the Tower of Darkness Cries : Harcourt 1967. (Reprinted by Travel Book Club 1968 as "Turkey Observed")
- Glimpses of a Planet : Pauline Dorricott Books: London, 1997.

=== History and Biography ===
- The Secret History of Genghis Khan : Peter Davies: London, 1969.
- Marco Polo's Travels (in Xanadu With Kublai Khan) : Macmillan 1976.
- The Travels of Herodotus : Gordon and Cremonesi, 1979.

=== Short story collections ===
- Nine Legends : Pauline Dorricott: London, 1991.
- Two Northern Stories : Pauline Dorricott: London, 1996.

=== Personal faith ===
- Me and the Holy Spirit : Pauline Dorricott Books: London, 1999.

== Recognition and activities ==
Lister's major honour was being voted in as Fellow of the Royal Society of Literature (FRSL) 1970. During his most active period of writing, the 1950s to the 1980s, he also produced a variety of essays and reviews, largely for the same genre of magazines as he frequently wrote poetry for, but also for the likes of the New Statesman and Nation in the 1950s His own works were reviewed in similar publications during those times, and also in more specialised publications such as The Library journal book review,

On entering the field of professional literature, Lister did not immediately give up writing on matters in his field of technical competence; as late as 1955 at least, he was writing semi-technical articles on metallurgy. His poetic works have appeared in anthologies for many years, such as The Revolutionaries and The Idle Demon, and A Toast to 2000, A Mind Reborn in Streatham Common. and Defenestration Something about the word "defenestration" apparently tickles popular humour; the poem seems to be the most popularly quoted of Lister's light verse, and it was set to music by the group Instant Sunshine. Its erudite tone certainly suits that group's witty and whimsical idiom.

== Painting ==
In 2010 Lister occasionally still wrote poetry, although his main endeavour from about 1980 on was painting. He explained in the introduction to Nine Legends: “In 1980 people started buying my paintings, so I took to painting in all the time I had available to me. Painting from then on occupied me happily and kept me alive for the next ten years.” On inspecting two of his works shown in his attached portrait, one might suspect that this unlooked-for success in a competitive field could stem partly from a curious talent for combining a playful presentation with serious background material, such as clouds and mountains that are rendered with conviction in paintings that initially give an impression of a childlike style. His readers might find it worth contemplating that aspect in analogy to his writing style; practically everything Lister produced in any medium had something serious at the core.
