= Alexei Zimin =

Russian dissident and chef (1971–2024)

Alexei Alexandrovich Zimin (Russian: Алексе́й Алекса́ндрович Зими́н; 13 December 1971 – 12 November 2024) was a Russian restaurateur, writer and chef who was based in the United Kingdom. He was found dead in Belgrade in November 2024. Zimin was a critic of the Russian annexation of Crimea in 2014.

== Life and career ==
Zimin was born in Dubna near Moscow, Moscow Oblast, Russia on 13 December 1971.

Zimin was deputy editor-in-chief of Afisha magazine, founded Afisha.Food, worked as editor-in-chief of Afisha World, Gourmet, and GQ Russia editor in chief before training at Le Cordon Bleu London. He went on to open Moscow's first chef's table restaurant, Ragout, as well as a food magazine, Afisha Eda, and a Moscow fast food chain.

He had a cookery show on NTV which was cancelled after he made critical comments on social media (a video on Instagram singing the Bulat Okudzhava Russian anti-war song "Grab Your Coat and Let’s Go Home") against the Russian invasion of Ukraine in 2022.

Zimin co-owned ZIMA, an eponymous restaurant on Frith Street in the Soho district of London with Katerina Ternovskaya. The restaurant had been the subject of abuse and threats of arson following the Russian invasion of Ukraine.

His book Anglomania was published in 2024. Zimin was promoting the book in Serbia at the time of his death. He was found dead by the owner of his rented apartment in Belgrade on 12 November 2024. Serbian authorities said there were no suspicious circumstances surrounding his death. An autopsy and toxicology reports are being undertaken.

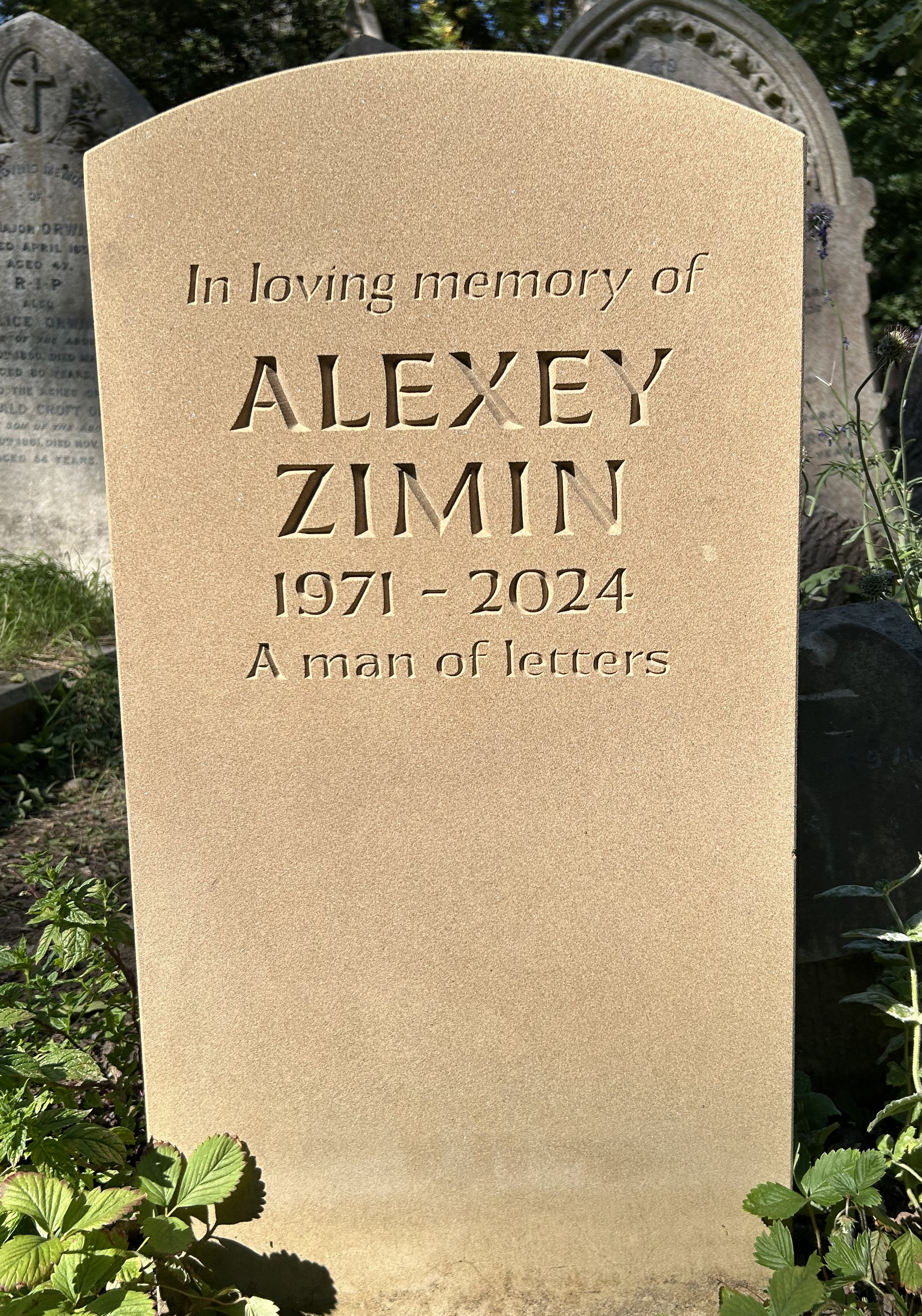
Grave of Alexey Zimin in Highgate Cemetery

== Personal life ==
Zimin was married to Tatiana Dolmatovskaya, costume designer for theatre and film. They had three children - Varvara Zimina (b. 2006), Nikolai Zimin (b. 2009) and Paul Zimin (b. 2011).

== Autopsy report ==
According to autopsy report, Zimin died from liver cirrhosis and aortic rupture. Zimin was cremated on 23 November 2024 at the Belgrade's Lešće cemetery. His ashes were buried at Highgate Cemetery on December 13, 2024.

== See also ==
- Suspicious Russia-related deaths since 2022
