= Forex Club =

Financial companies in the Caribbean

- Formation: 1997
- Founded at: Saint Vincent and the Grenadines
- Type: Company
- Legal status: Active
- Products: Аkmos Trade; Libertex
- Services: Finance
- Website: fxclub.org libertex.org (Latin America) libertex.fxclub.org (Miner Bitcoin App)

Forex Club is a group of companies based in Saint Vincent and the Grenadines participating in the retail market of Contract for difference, Foreign Exchange Trading. The company uses the Libertex trading platform on web and mobile, along with MT4. It includes financial and educational companies.

== History ==
The company was founded in 1997. In 2010, it acquired 100% of the shares of the Russian forex broker Аkmos Trade. The brand remained and is included in the Forex Club group of companies.

In 2012, Quadro Capital Partners acquired a minority shareholding in the Forex Club group of companies, the amount of the transaction has not been indicated.

In December 2013, Forex Club and Quadro Capital Partners founded the Venture Capital Fund FXC-QCP VC, with a volume of up to $200 million.

According to Finmarket information agency data, in 2014 Forex Club ranked among the three Russian Forex brokers with the highest number of clients and monthly turnover volumes. At that time, the number of active clients of the company was 71,830 people, representing 16.97% of the market ( surpassed by Alpari ). (120,000 people, and 28.35% of the market)). The company's average monthly turnover was $63.32 million, representing 18.09% of the market (surpassed by Alpari ($107 million and 30.56% of the market)).

In January 2015, Forex Club organized the project Living Collection of Private Investments at its customer service office, an interactive exhibition on the history of investment and disposition of private capital.

In December 2015, in accordance with the Foreign Exchange Market Law of Russian Federation, Forex Club submitted an application to Central Bank to obtain the Russian Forex broker license; in June 2016, the Bank of Russia rejected the company's application. According to company representatives, after resolving certain formal observations, a new application was submitted to the Central Bank. In October 2016, Forex Club received the license.

According to the National Foreign Exchange Centre of the Belarus Stock Exchange, the company ranks first "in terms of the volume of transactions of customers with non-deliverable over-the-counter instruments of customers on all underlying assets among the foreign exchange companies included in the register of the National Bank of Belarus".

In January 2019, the Russian government revoked the license.

On November 25, 2022, the co-founder and controlling shareholder of Retail FX and CFDs brokerage brands Libertex and Forex Club died in a helicopter crash in Monaco.

=== Libertex ===
In June 2015 Forex Club launched the trading platform Libertex.

The midfielder of Real Madrid, James Rodríguez, was the brand's ambassador in 2017 and 2018. Libertex was recognized as a member of FinaCom in 2018.

In 2020 the company began to actively promote the Libertex trading platform in Ukraine and Kazakhstan.

== Administration ==
In the years 2012–2013, Pavel Teplukhin headed the board of directors of Forex Club. In March 2013, this position was filled by the founder and CEO of the company, Vyacheslav Tarán. In July 2015, the position of chief executive officer was filled by former executive vice president and chief financial officer Michael Geiger.

== Controversies ==
Forex Club (Libertex) has a history of compliance problems that forced the company to cease retail operations in the US. In 2010, the capital of Forex Club Financial Company, Inc. did not correspond to the licensing requirements. Company management explained that the license capital was frozen, and the company was trying to keep it at the minimum acceptable level. According to the Vice President of Forex Club FС Piotr Tatarnikov, the main cause of capital decrease was the growth of client positions. Finally, it was increased by 1.5 million dollars.

In 2012, the National Futures Association ( NFA ) charged the company with numerous violations such as failure to maintain internal controls, keeping financial records, running an adequate anti-money laundering program (in the area of finance FinCEN and OFAC), and CEO Peter Tatarnikov was charged with failing to supervise the company's operations and staff diligently. Among other sanctions, the company was fined $300,000 by the NFA.

According to Reuters and FinanceMagnates.com, by November 2012 due to regulatory tightening in the United States the company decided to voluntary exit the US market and sell their operations and client base to FXCM in a deal that was under development for several months.
