= Dan Rapoport =

Latvia-born American investor and financial executive (c. 1970–2022)

- Даниил Рапопорт
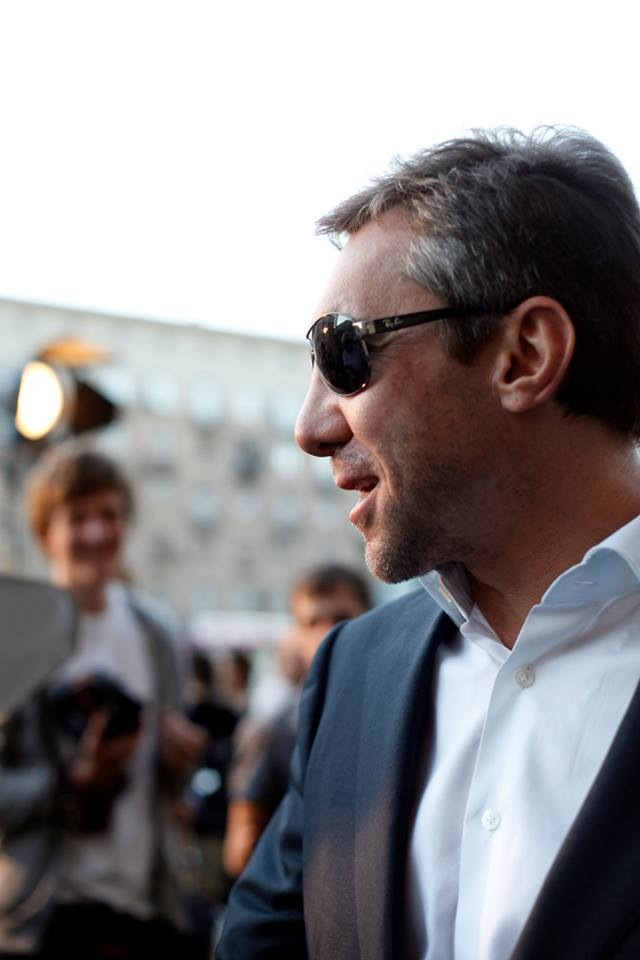
- Rapoport in 2014
- Born: Dan Rapoport; Даниил Рапопорт; April 30, 1968; Riga, Latvian SSR, Soviet Union
- Died: August 14, 2022 (aged 54); Washington, D.C.
- Cause of death: Fall from a building
- Other name: David Jewberg (pen name)
- Education: University of Houston; Middlesex University (MBA)
- Known for: Businessman, socialite, Putin regime critic
- Spouses: Irina Rapoport (div. 2016): Alyona/Olena Rapoport
- Children: 3

Dan Rapoport (Russian: Даниил Рапопорт; April 30, 1968 – August 14, 2022) was a Latvian-American investor, financial executive, and outspoken critic of Russian president Vladimir Putin. He died after a fall from his high-rise apartment building in Washington, D.C.; the medical examiner, after an autopsy, listed the manner of death as undetermined. Rapoport's death was one of a series of suspicious deaths of Russian businessmen and Putin critics during the Russian invasion of Ukraine and it remains a source of speculation if there was foul play or not.

== Early life and education ==
Rapoport was born in 1968 to a Jewish family in Riga, Latvian Soviet Socialist Republic (now Latvia). In 1980, his family received political asylum and emigrated to the United States, settling in Houston, Texas. He graduated from the University of Houston in 1991, in 2015 he earned an MBA from Middlesex University in London.

== Career ==
=== Finance ===
After graduating from the University of Houston, Rapoport returned to Russia employed by Phibro Energy. He worked as a financial analyst for the first Russian American joint venture for oil production, White Nights Joint Enterprises, which was based in Raduzhny, Siberia. After leaving Phibro, Rapoport remained in Russia, working in corporate finance, brokerage and investment banking. He was a close associate of the American financier Marc Rich. He held senior positions with several Russian financial institutions and completed various cross border transactions representing Russian companies and various international institutional investors. In 1995, Rapoport joined the CentreInvest Group and in 1999 was appointed managing director of CentreInvest Securities, in New York. From 2003, he was the executive director and head of the brokerage business in Moscow for CentreInvest Securities, a brokerage specializing in mid cap equities.

=== Soho Rooms ===
Rapoport was known for being co-owner of the iconic Moscow nightclub Soho Rooms. Located on Savvinskaya Embankment, from its establishment around 2007 through much of the 2010s, it was one of the most fashionable clubs in Moscow, where oligarchs like Mikhail Prokhorov were known to party. "A table started at ₽100,000 (US$3,300), Cristal champagne flowed like a river, and Timati, VIA Gra and the best foreign DJs performed on stage", wrote one Russian newspaper

In February 2017, Rapoport's business partner and co-owner of Soho Rooms, Sergey Tkachenko, died from a fall from his apartment window. He was filmed dangling from the open window of a 19th floor apartment in the Presnensky District of downtown Moscow. In the footage shot by a passerby on the street below, he is seen clinging to the window frame while a woman attempts to pull him back from inside the room, before losing his grip and plunging to his death. Tkachenko had left active management of Soho Rooms four years prior to embark on a DJ career, had just opened his own club, Mir, in the downtown Moscow, and was engaged to be married. How he ended up on the window ledge, and if he intentionally let go, is uncertain. Some witnesses stated the death was the result of a dispute between Tkachenko and a woman he shared the apartment with, presumably his fiancé.

Soho Rooms closed in April 2017, with employees reporting that the club remained profitable but "times had changed."

== SEC proceedings ==
In 2008, while based in Moscow, Rapoport was charged by the U.S. Securities and Exchange Commission (SEC) with an alleged violation of Section 15(a) of the Securities Exchange Act of 1934. The SEC claimed that the alleged infraction occurred while he was managing director of CentreInvest Securities in Moscow and indirectly oversaw the activities of CentreInvest Inc. in New York. Unable to serve Rapoport with due notice at his Moscow location, the SEC in 2009 entered a default judgment. Once aware of the default judgment, Rapoport responded by filing a motion under Exchange Rule 155 (b) to vacate the judgment. After several court decisions, in 2012, the Court of Appeals for the District of Columbia Circuit, Judge David B. Sentelle presiding, unanimously granted Rapoport's petition to vacate, quoting the SEC's failure to consistently apply its own rule.

== Life in the United States and Ukraine ==
In June 2012, Rapoport returned to the United States. It was reported that he left Russia in large part due to his support for Russia's democratic opposition, particularly Alexei Navalny, an outspoken yet tolerated campaigner against Russian corporate and government corruption and the most vocal critic of Putin's regime. In that same year, he founded Rapoport Capital.

In 2016, Rapoport divorced his first wife, Irina, a fashion model with whom he had two kids. Soon thereafter he relocated to Kyiv, Ukraine where he met and married his second wife, Alyona, a virologist from Kyiv, together they had a daughter. The couple remained there until Russia's invasion of Ukraine in 2022.

In a divorce settlement finalized in October 2016, Irina Rapoport became the sole owner of the Washington DC property she and Dan had owned together, a mansion on Tracy Place in the Kalorama district of Washington, DC. On January 4, 2017, Irina sold the Kalorama property to Tracy DC Real Estate, a corporation formed in 2016 controlled by Chilean billionaire and mining magnate Andronico Luksic Craig. The sale of the Kalorama mansion made headlines after it was revealed that Jared Kushner and Ivanka Trump would be Luksic's new tenants.

In 2018, the investigative organization Bellingcat reported that Rapoport created the pen name David Jewberg, who was regularly quoted in Ukrainian media as a senior Pentagon analyst.

== Death ==
On the evening of August 14, 2022, Rapoport was found on the street in Washington D.C. outside 2400 M Street NW in the city's West End, a nine-story high-rise luxury apartment building from which he had fallen to his death. He was wearing flip flops and a black hat; on his body were a cracked cell phone, headphones and $2,620 in cash, but no wallet. Initially the D.C. Police said there was no suspicion of foul play and it was thought to be a suicide but they were waiting for the coroner report. In November the D.C. medical examiner's office issued its report, finding that the cause of death was "multiple blunt force injuries due to fall from height" and the manner of death was "undetermined"; the report did not conclusively explain the circumstances leading up to his death. Because the manner of death is undetermined, the case remains technically open, but it was not being actively investigated, until or unless new information emerged.

His death was cited by some as suspicious. "Whenever someone who is in a negative view of the Putin regime dies suspiciously, one should rule out foul play, not rule it in," Bill Browder said. David Satter said about the case "Nothing adds up ... everything we do know is very, very strange." Fiona Hill remained wary, telling Politico "Not every unexplained death in Russia is the KGB or the GRU bumping someone off." Ilya Ponomarev said Rapoport seemed depressed to him, but didn't seem suicidal. A friend in Washington, Yuri Somov, said he thinks the suicide story is plausible. According to Somov, Rapoport told him that it had "been a very difficult three months", which Somov observed, "From him, particularly, that's saying a lot. More than notable, it was extraordinary." His widow does not believe it was suicide and was seeking an independent blood analysis.

== See also ==
- List of unsolved deaths
