= Moscow Central Clinical Hospital =

Central Clinical Hospital of the Administrative directorate of the President of the Russian Federation
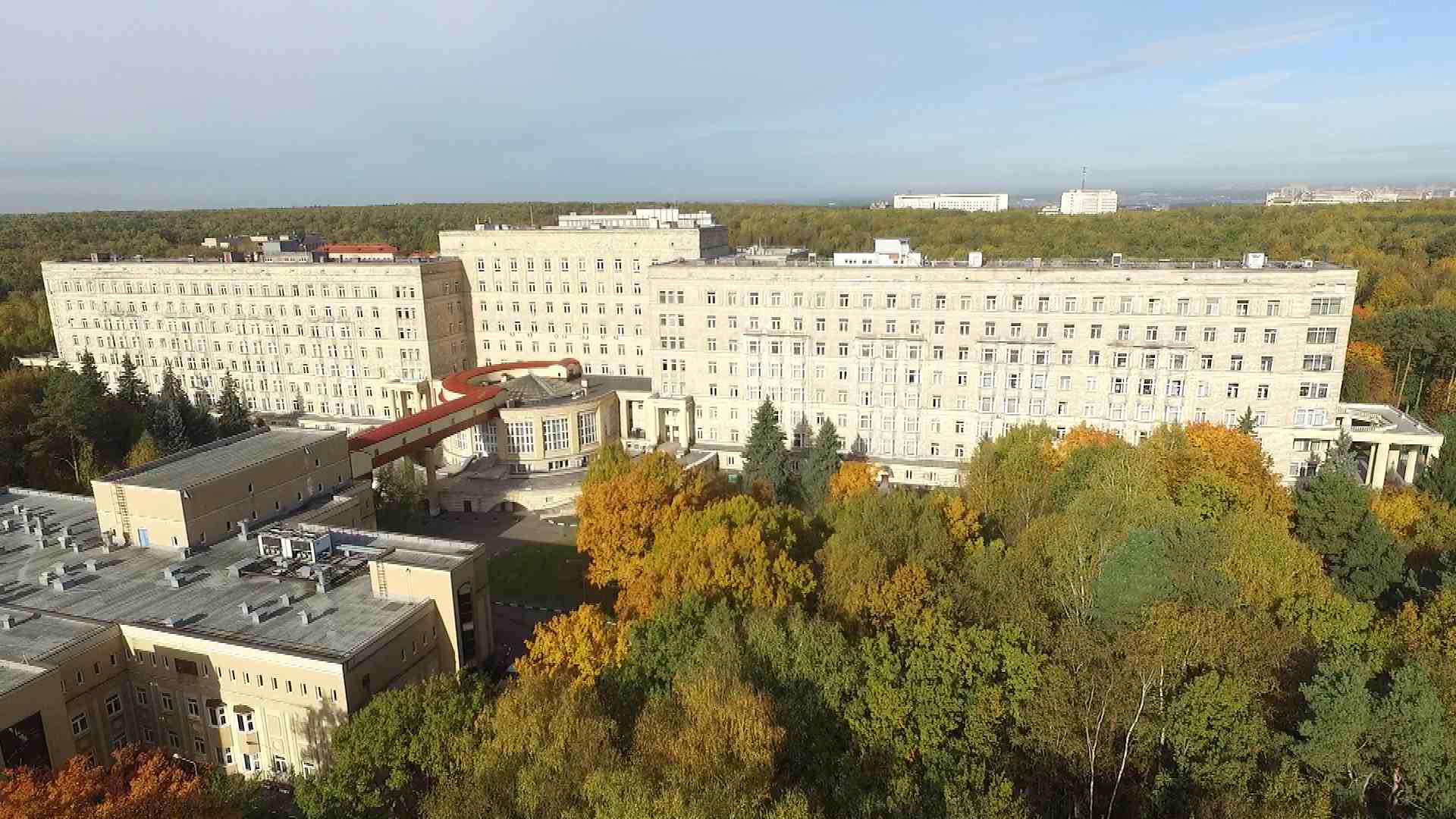

Geography
- Location: 15 Marshal Timoshenko Street, Kuntsevo District, Moscow, Russia
- Coordinates: 55°44′47″N 37°23′21″E

Services
- Emergency department: Yes
- Beds: 1,200

Helipads
- Helipad: Yes

History
- Founded: 29 November 1957

Links
- Website: www.cchp.ru (in Russian)
- Lists: Hospitals in Russia

The Central Clinical Hospital of the Administrative directorate of the President of the Russian Federation (Russian: Центральная клиническая больница c поликлиникой Управления делами Президента Российской Федерации) (also called "Kremlin Hospital", "Kremlyovka" and the "Kremlin Clinic") is a heavily guarded facility 14 kilometres west of the Kremlin in an exclusive, wooded suburban area known as Kuntsevo. The hospital is guarded by the Federal Protective Service.

Among patients are political, business, cultural and scientific elite of Russia (and Soviet Union before 1991, like presidents Yuri Andropov or Konstantin Chernenko) and representatives of the diplomatic corps. The hospital now accepts an increasing number of private, self-paying patients and it is common to pay for one's treatment. While the hospital is open to the public and anyone may theoretically be admitted and treated there, its fees and charges are well beyond the means of most Russians and so it retains its elitist image.

== History ==
On 13 August 1946, the Council of Ministers of the Soviet Union issued a decree on the design and construction of a new building Kremlin Hospital (Suburban Hospital) with 500 beds. In March 1947, the Government has identified the volume of financing (consolidated estimates for the construction of buildings of the Central Clinical Hospital is only closed December 20, 1963), and in April 1947, decided to place a new hospital in the forest in Kuntsevo. Initially, it was allocated 150 hectares of land, and in 1953 the total area of the hospital reached 209 hectares.

Construction of the hospital and its infrastructure started in 1948. However, despite the measures taken, the construction was carried out slowly. Much of the credit for the construction of hospitals and organization of its follow-up belongs to Vasily Kholodkova.

In 1957, the construction of the first two buildings (No.6 and No.7) housing 123 beds was complete. The hospital was opened for patient treatment on 29 November 1957. On December 2, the hospital admitted its first patient.

In September 1960, the Suburban Hospital was renamed the Central Clinical Hospital of the Fourth Main Department of the Ministry of Health of the Soviet Union.

From 1961 to 1963, the main building was constructed. It housed the main branch of specialized therapeutic and surgical, as well as large medical-diagnostic department (X-ray, physiotherapy, functional diagnostics).

In 1968, the first hemodialysis center in the Soviet Union opened, and in 1973 a computing center was established.

In the late 1970s and early 1980s, the hospital carried out specialized therapeutic care for basic medical specialties: cardiology, gastroenterology, pulmonology, nephrology, endocrinology, allergology, hematology, neurology.

Later on, new buildings were put into operation: in 1981 - anatomopathological, 1982 - therapeutic, 1985 - Pharmacy, 1989, 2001 - operationally intensive care.

In October 2011, a branch of assisted reproductive technologies was opened, and in November 2012, the Department of Neurosurgery.

On 30 August 2022, at the age of 91, Mikhail Gorbachev died at the Moscow Central Hospital. According to the hospital, his death followed a "severe and prolonged illness."

On 1 September 2022, Ravil Maganov, the chairman of the board of Lukoil and a critic of Russia's invasion of Ukraine, allegedly died due to injuries he suffered after falling from the 6th floor of the hospital following a visit to the hospital that day by Russian president Vladimir Putin.
