= Gunpoint (video game) =

2013 video game

- Steam Store logo
- Developer: Suspicious Developments
- Publisher: Suspicious Developments
- Designer: Tom Francis
- Programmer: Tom Francis
- Artists: John Roberts; Fabian van Dommelen
- Writer: Tom Francis
- Composers: Ryan Ike; John Robert Matz; Francisco Cerda
- Engine: Game Maker 8
- Platforms: Windows, Linux, OS X
- Release: Windows; 3 June 2013; Linux, OS X; 9 September 2014
- Genre: Puzzle-platform
- Mode: Single-player

Gunpoint is a stealth-based puzzle-platform video game created by indie developer Tom Francis. The game was released for Microsoft Windows on 3 June 2013, and soon followed with versions for OS X and Linux.

The game is set in the near future and sees players assume the role of freelance spy Richard Conway, who is tasked with infiltrating buildings to fulfil assignments from various clients. To do so, the player must avoid guards and bypass security features with the aid of a number of high-tech gadgets, such as the Crosslink tool which is used to rewire electrical circuits. Throughout the game, Conway seeks to clear his name in the murder of a high-profile weapons manufacturer, and gradually uncovers a murder mystery in his search for the real killer.

After Gunpoint, Francis and his game studio Suspicious Developments went on to release the games Heat Signature (2017) and Tactical Breach Wizards (2024). The three games share themes of infiltration and strategy, and Suspicious Developments named the trio of games the Defenestration Trilogy to convey their common themes.

== Gameplay ==
Gunpoint is divided into a number of missions, between which the player, as Richard Conway, interacts with others through a PDA to accept missions, shop for new gear, and allocate resource points among various abilities Conway possesses. Each mission typically involves entering a building and hack into a computer, and then making way for the exit point of the level. Initially missions are provided in a linear order but the game provides optional missions later.

Gunpoint is normally shown to the player as in the bottom left of the above screenshot, showing a cross-section of the building. When in Crosslink mode, shown on the upper right, much of the building is shown in silhouette to highlight circuits and how devices are connected to those circuits (red lines). The player can manipulate these to sneak around the building to complete missions.

The building is presented in a two-dimensional cross-section on screen, showing the locations of guards, doors, switch panels, lights, security cameras, and other features, including the target objectives. The player, as Conway, can run and climb on walls, use stairwells and elevators, and using the abilities of Conway's "Bullfrog" hypertrousers, can launch the character great heights or distances, potentially tackling guards or breaking through glass walls. Conway can survive long falls, but can be killed by a single gunshot, thus requiring the player to stay out of the guards' line of sight.

Within a few missions, the player gains access to the Crosslink device. This allows the player to change the view to show all the security features of the building and their current connectivity, such as the light controlled by a given light switch. From here, the player can rewire these controls, within the current limits of the Crosslink, such as by making a light switch control a secured door, or by completely disabling a security feature. The availability of which controls can be affected is initially limited at the start of the game, but as the player earns in-game money, they can buy improved features, such as being able to control encrypted controls or even affect weapons carried by guards. With the Crosslink, the player can then create situations that would allow them to sneak through without being detected by guards, lure the guards into areas where they can be neutralized, or simply to gain access to secured areas of the facility. Other tools to help navigate the building and avoid guards become available to purchase later. The player is ranked at the end of each mission based on time taken, number of guards knocked out/killed, number of times they were spotted, and how much noise or distraction they created.

The game includes a level editor to allow players to create their own challenges.

== Development ==
Gunpoint was developed by Tom Francis in his spare time while working as section editor for PC Gamer UK magazine. Francis had no formal background in programming, but having learned that Spelunky was created by one person with the user-friendly software suite Game Maker 8, he decided to experiment with game development. He started work on his first game, under the working title Private Dick, in May 2010. Within about a month Francis had a working prototype which he released on his blog to gauge interest and garner feedback.

After making further progress on the game's core mechanics, Francis requested on his blog that interested artists submit character and background mockups for the game to replace his programmer art. He described the response as "humbling and overwhelming," and ultimately chose to work with artists John Roberts and Fabian van Dommelen. Francis then repeated this process for musicians, recruiting Ryan Ike, Francisco Cerda, and John Robert Matz to create the background music of Gunpoint.

The concept for Gunpoint came from Francis' review work for PC Gamer UK, as he found himself often writing means of suggesting how games could be improved, and considered himself too harsh for writing such criticism. He wanted to make a game that avoided the pitfall of assuming "the player is stupid", and instead not worry about if the player out-thought his own level design. The idea of the Crosslink tool made it effectively a type of limited level editor to let the player complete each level in the manner they wanted to. Francis considered that the stealth element was less about evasion and more on simply avoiding being even seen by the guards; he considered that for most other games, player characters can typically take a great deal of damage, and instead wanted to make the player consider the guards' guns as serious threats and included instant death if seen by the guards. The Crosslink tool could thus allow players to deal with such guards without even being in the same room. Francis did cut out one element of the Crosslink tool that would allow the player to remotely activate a device that is on an accessible circuit as he felt this would make for trivial solutions.

The game was released for Windows on 3 June 2013, and for Linux and OS X on 9 September 2014 as part of a Humble Bundle. In 2015, the game was ported by Abstraction Games to a newer version of the game engine, with added support for Steam Workshop.

== Reception ==
Reception

Aggregate score
Aggregator	Score
Metacritic	83/100

Review scores
Publication	Score
Destructoid	9.5/10
Eurogamer	8/10
GameSpot	7.5/10
IGN	9.0/10
Joystiq	4.5/5
Polygon	9/10

Gunpoint was positively received by critics, attaining a score of 83/100 from review aggregator Metacritic. The game was widely praised for its gameplay, art style, music, and writing; while its short length was a common criticism. Eurogamer awarded the game 8/10 and wrote "'Always leave them wanting more,' goes the old showbiz adage, and Gunpoint certainly does that." GameSpot's review was more critical of the game's length, awarding it 7.5/10 and describing it as "the start of something great, but without more content, it feels too much like the appetizer to a main course." Destructoid gave the game 9.5/10 and called it "a hallmark of excellence," noting that "its short length might be seen as a flaw, but a robust level editor soundly nips that issue in the bud." PC Gamer UK, where Francis worked while developing the game, declined to review it in order to avoid any perceived conflict of interest.

Francis noted that his only development cost was $30 for a version of Game Maker 8. He recouped this cost within 64 seconds of offering pre-orders for the game, but since has made revenue many times more than this and recognizing he was making enough to become a game developer. With the success of Gunpoint, Francis announced that he would be departing PC Gamer UK to take up full-time independent game development, while still writing freelance for the magazine from time to time.
