= Heat Signature (video game) =

2017 action stealth video game

- Developer: Suspicious Developments
- Publisher: Suspicious Developments
- Designer: Tom Francis
- Programmers: Tom Francis; John Winder
- Artist: John Roberts
- Writer: Tom Francis
- Composers: John Halpart; Christopher James Harvey
- Engine: GameMaker Studio
- Platform: Microsoft Windows
- Release: 21 September 2017
- Genres: Action, stealth
- Mode: Single-player

Heat Signature is an action stealth video game developed and published in 2017 by Suspicious Developments, the studio behind 2013's Gunpoint. The player plays as a mercenary who takes on missions around a procedurally generated galaxy in order to liberate space stations. Heat Signature launched for Microsoft Windows on September 21, 2017.

== Gameplay ==
Heat Signature is an action and stealth video game played from a top-down view. Players take control of a member of a group of space mercenaries who embarks on a variety of missions such as hijacking space vessels, stealing technology, assassinating crew members, rescuing captives, and more. Operating from a central base, mercenaries take on missions that require the player to fly the mercenary via a small shuttlecraft to a travelling ship, dock with it, and then infiltrate the ship and return to home base safely. The ultimate goal is to liberate the strongholds of each of the four factions in a randomly-generated nebula. The nebula serves as a tech tree, allowing the player, with each liberation, to unlock various items, such as guns, gadgets, explosives, or pods. Each station within the nebula also includes a defector mission, which are specially developed missions that, in a way, operate as different challenges for the player to attempt; as they offer no monetary gain, these missions are typically completed out of leisure or as a way to practice for standard missions. The layouts of the nebulae, the ships, their crew, and missions are procedurally generated, similar to games of the roguelike genre.

Normally, the game operates in real time. At any time, the player can pause the game, which then provides a menu screen that provides additional options for the player to perform, such as switching weapons, picking up or dropping inventory items, or taking remote control of the shuttle, as well as to plan their next move, such as selecting a target for their attack. This can be done indefinitely, allowing for stunts such as picking up the weapon of a fallen enemy, equipping it, and using it against another target all while in this pause screen. Thus, the game often becomes much more about prediction and somewhat turn-based strategy rather than devising and implementing tactics in real time.

== Development and release ==
Heat Signature was developed by Suspicious Developments, a team led by former PC Gamer editor Tom Francis. Development took about three years starting around December 2013, and cost around £200,000.

The game was released for Microsoft Windows on 21 September 2017. At the time of release, Francis knew that releasing the game was "biggest risk of [his] life", as the indie game market was saturated with titles. He had hoped to see at least half the sales that he got with Gunpoint. Within the first week, he reported that the sales of Heat Signature had exceeded those of Gunpoint, and that the game was one of the top sellers on Steam during its initial week.

=== Post-launch updates ===
After avoiding criticism of Heat Signature for two weeks after release, Tom Francis agreed with many of the caveats in the other-wise positive reviews, saying in a blog post "almost every critique I read I thought was a fair point." Three months after launch the Fair Points update was released with fixes to these issues.

To celebrate the one year anniversary of Heat Signature's launch the Space Birthday update was released. It is the largest update the game has received, spending five months in development. The update was dedicated to John Francis, Tom's father, who died during development.

== Reception ==
Reception

Aggregate score
Aggregator	Score
Metacritic	79/100

Review scores
Publication	Score
Eurogamer	Recommended
Game Informer	8.5/10
IGN	8/10
PC Gamer (US)	85/100
USgamer	3.5/5
PCGamesN	7/10

Heat Signature was nominated for "Best Action Game" at IGN's Best of 2017 Awards. It was nominated for the Seumas McNally Grand Prize at the Independent Games Festival 2018.
