= Molo =

Molo may refer to:

== People ==
- Molo (ethnic group)
- Molo of Rhodes, rhetorical teacher of Cicero and Julius Caesar
- Molo (satrap of Media) (died 220 BC), a general and satrap of the Seleucid king Antiochus the Great
- Molo (footballer) (born 1985), real name, Manuel Jesús Casas García, Spanish footballer known as Molo
- Francis Molo (born 1994), New Zealand-Australian Rugby League player

== Places ==
- Molo (monument), an historic quayside in Venice, Italy
- Molo (Genoa), a neighbourhood in the old town of Genoa
- Molo, Iloilo City, a district in Iloilo City, Philippines
- Molo, Kenya

== Other ==
- Molo (group), shortened name of Molotov Movement, a hip hop / rap collective in Denmark
- OS X Mountain Lion or MoLo
- Mobile local search or MoLo
- Molo (butterfly), a genus of butterflies in the grass skipper family
- molo (design company), a Canadian multidisciplinary design studio
- molo, an African lute
- Finnish profanity § molo

== See also ==
- Mollo (disambiguation)
- Pancit Molo, a Filipino pork dumpling soup
