= Mollo =

Mollo may refer to:

- Mollo (surname)
- Mollo culture, Andean civilization during the period of AD 1000 to 1500
- Mollo Kingdom, a region of the Atoni princely dynasty of West Timor
- Molló, a town and municipality in the comarca of Ripollès in Girona, Catalonia, Spain
- Mollo, a parent-oriented media published by the Canadian media company URBANIA since 2023.

== See also ==
- Molo (disambiguation)
- Prats-de-Mollo-la-Preste, commune in the Pyrénées-Orientales department in southern France
