= Mollo (surname) =

Mollo is a surname. Notable people with the surname include:

- Andrew Mollo (born 1940), British film designer, screenwriter and book author
- Ann Mollo (born 1933), British set decorator
- Dario Mollo, Italian musician and record producer
- Fabio Mollo (born 1980), Italian film director
- John Mollo (1931–2017), British costume designer and book author
- Mike Mollo (born 1980), American professional heavyweight boxer
- Ricardo Mollo (born 1957), Argentine rock musician
- Rosmery Mollo, Bolivian activist
- Victor Mollo (1909–1987), British contract bridge player, journalist and author
- Yohan Mollo (born 1989), French footballer
- Ryne Angelo Mollo (born 2000) Historian, Professor, Teacher
