= Molo (Genoa) =

Neighborhood of Genoa, Italy

- Quartiere
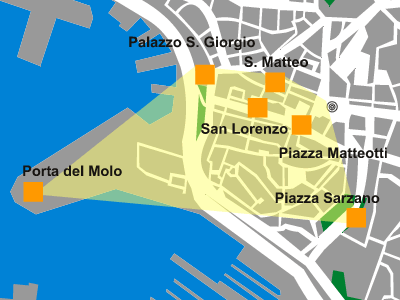
- Map of Molo

- Location in Italy
- Coordinates: 44°24′24″N 8°55′47″E
- Country: Italy
- Region: Liguria
- Province: Province of Genoa
- Comune: Genoa

Area
  - Total: 0.35 km^{2} (0.14 sq mi)

Population
  - Total: 11,588
- Postal codes: 16123, 16128
- Area code: 010

Molo (Ligurian: Meu) is a neighbourhood in the old town of the Italian city of Genoa. It was one of the six sestieri of ancient Genoa. At present it is part of Municipio I (Centro Est) of Great Genoa.

Located close to the old harbour it had been for many centuries the seat of political and religious power of the city.

== Etymology ==
Molo takes its name from the pier (in Italian "molo") built since the 13th century by enlarging the natural spit enclosing Mandraccio cove, the oldest portion of old harbour, today filled. The Molo was further repeatedly expanded and fortified; now it is called Molo Vecchio (Old Pier), as opposite to the New Pier, built at the end of the 19th century at the western side of the port.

== Demographics ==
On 31 December 2015 there were 11,588 people living in Molo, with a population density of 33,109 people per km².

== Geography ==
Molo is located south east in the old town of Genoa and includes three zones:

- Hill of Castello, seat of the first city settlement (6th century B.C.), in a dominant position on the harbour.
- The portion of old town at the foot of the hill of Castello, for many centuries seat of political and religious power of the city, with the Doge's Palace and St. Lawrence cathedral.
- The neighbourhood properly called "Molo", with its old houses close to "Malapaga walls" and Mandraccio cove.

== History ==
Hill of Castello was the first city settlement, founded by Ligurians in the 6th century B.C., dominating Mandraccio cove, place of commercial exchange with Etruscan people and Greek colonists from Marseille.

This settlement was destroyed by the Carthaginian general Mago Barca during Second Punic War and rebuilt by Romans in the semi-plain area immediately behind the harbour, closest to the harbour.

During the Early Middle Ages large part of the Roman city area was abandoned and became a rural area again. After the destructions caused by the Fatimid raid of 934 the city was rebuilt again. The bishop, who held both religious and political power, possessed a fortified castle on the top of the hill (which gave the name to the hill itself) and a palace near St. Lawrence cathedral. The most important feudal families built their palaces near the cathedral, in the place where later Doge's Palace was built, making this area the seat of the city power.

Since the 10th century the town expanded outside the walls, in areas at that time rural (as a reference, at that time date the names of some streets, like "Luccoli", from the Latin "lucus", wood, "Campetto", small field and "Canneto", cane field).

In the 12th century the noble families gave rise to the self-governing commune of Genoa which included the entire area within the new walls, known as Barbarossa's walls, divided in "civitas" (current Molo) and "burgus "(current Maddalena). These families, constantly fighting each other, had their own private citadels in the alleys, each with a palace, a central square and sometimes a noble church, such as Doria in San Matteo and Della Volta in San Torpete.

Alongside the feudal families, since 13th century grew the importance of Arts and Crafts Associations. In that same century to protect the harbour the pier which gives the name to the neighborhood was built. Over the centuries it was extended several times, the last time in 1835.

In the second half of the 19th century the harbour was expanded, creating an area for ship repairs, with the realization of the first two dry docks.

During World War II the city was severely damaged by aerial bombings: on the top of the hill the monasteries of San Silvestro and S. Maria in Passione and many houses were completely destroyed. The subsequent depopulation caused the decline of this area, situation well described in the film The Walls of Malapaga (1949).

During the last decades of the 20th century restructuring programs took place, and the neighborhood is now showing signs of recovery, with the restoration of homes and shops, the new building of Architecture department of Genoa University and cultural institution, like the Teatro della Tosse, boarding houses for students and meeting places for young people.

During Genoa Expo '92 exhibition the area of the old harbour was redeveloped by Renzo Piano, making it suitable for public access.

== Architecture ==
=== Doge's Palace ===
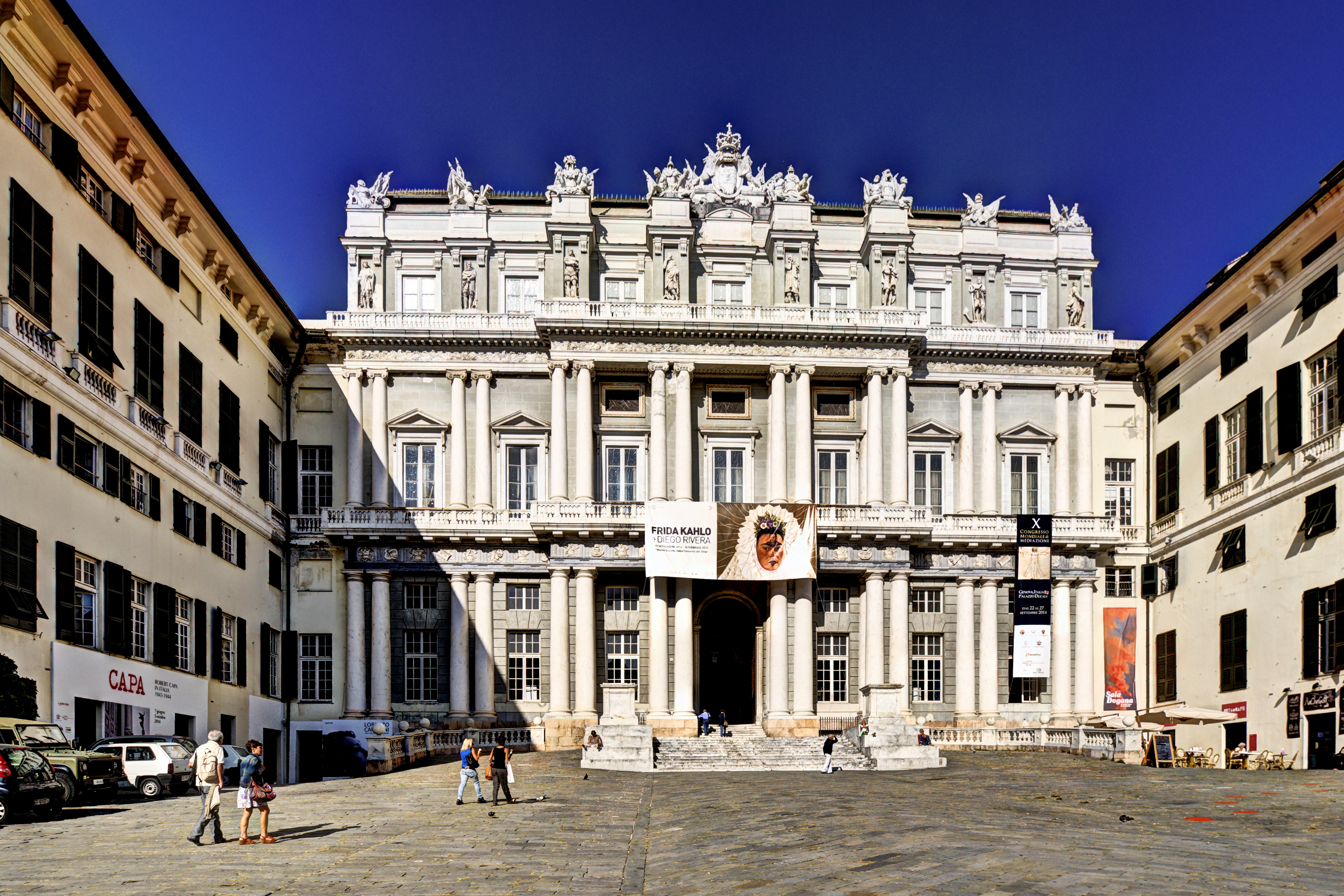
Doge's Palace, facade

The Doge's Palace, overlooking Piazza Matteotti with its neoclassical facade, was for centuries the seat of the doge of the Republic of Genoa.

The current building was designed in the late 16th century by Andrea Ceresola, but its origins date back to the late 13th century, when it was built as a seat for the Captain of the People. The palace was partially destroyed by fire in 1777 and rebuilt later by Simone Cantoni, who designed the current façade. After the end of the republic it was used before as town hall and later, till 1970, as court. Completely renovated in the 1980s, since 1992 it houses exhibitions and cultural events. In 2001 the Heads of State and Government gathered in Genoa for the G8 summit met here in conference.

The annex tower, said Torre Grimaldina, was used as a prison for political prisoners: in 1833 here the patriot Jacopo Ruffini committed suicide.

Contiguous to the Doge's Palace is the so-called "Criminal Palace", built at the end of the 16th century. It had been the court and the prison for commons criminals at the time of the republic, now it houses the State Archives.

=== St. George palace ===
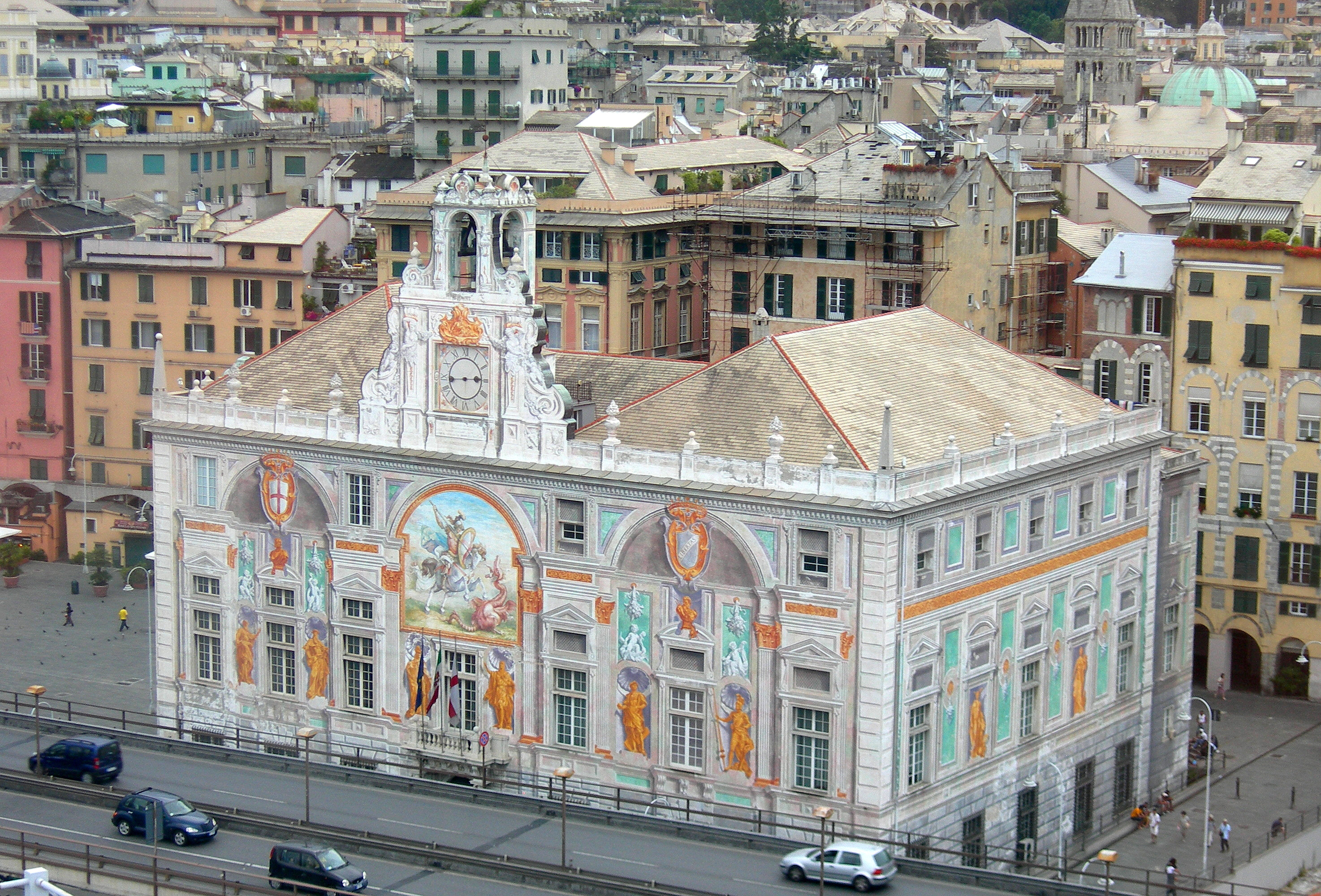
St. George palace seen by Bigo

Palazzo San Giorgio was built in the mid 13th century as the seat of Commune, but soon became the Customs office; in the 15th century it passed to the Bank of Saint George, from which took its name. Expanded in the 16th century, after a period of decline it was completely restored in the second half of the 19th century by Alfredo d'Andrade; since 1903 is the Genoa Port Authority headquarters.

The building consists of two distinct parts: the oldest one, remarkable example of medieval civil architecture, with the façade facing the porch of Sottoripa and a Renaissance part, facing the harbour quays, where the main entrance is.

=== Palazzi dei Rolli ===
The "Rolli di Genova" were, at the time of the Republic of Genoa, an official list of public lodging palaces of eminent Genoese families which aspired to host, by draw, foreign notable people visiting Genoa. Most of these buildings still exist, and in 2006 forty-two of them were inscribed by UNESCO in the list of World Heritage Site.

In Molo are 47 of these palaces (3 of which included in the list of World Heritage Site).

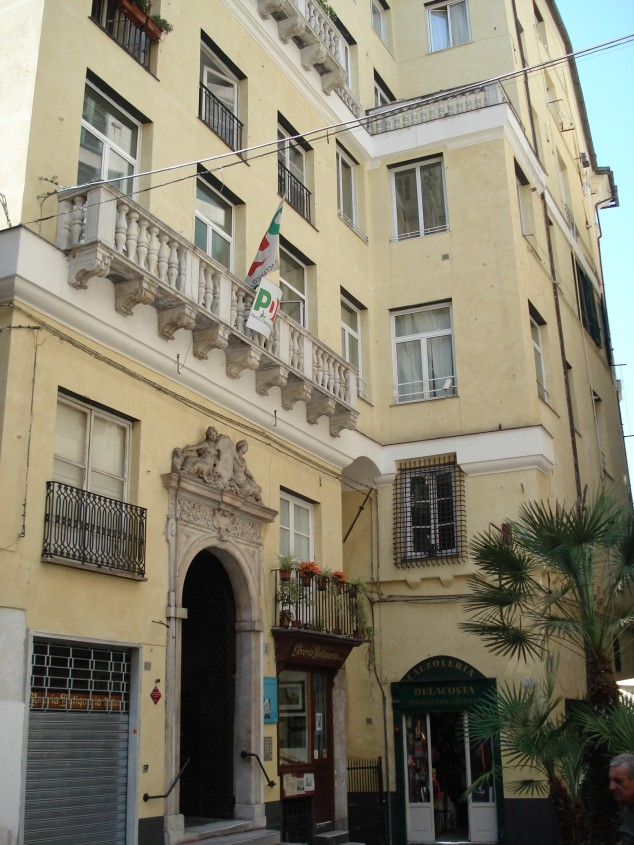
Palace De Marini-Croce

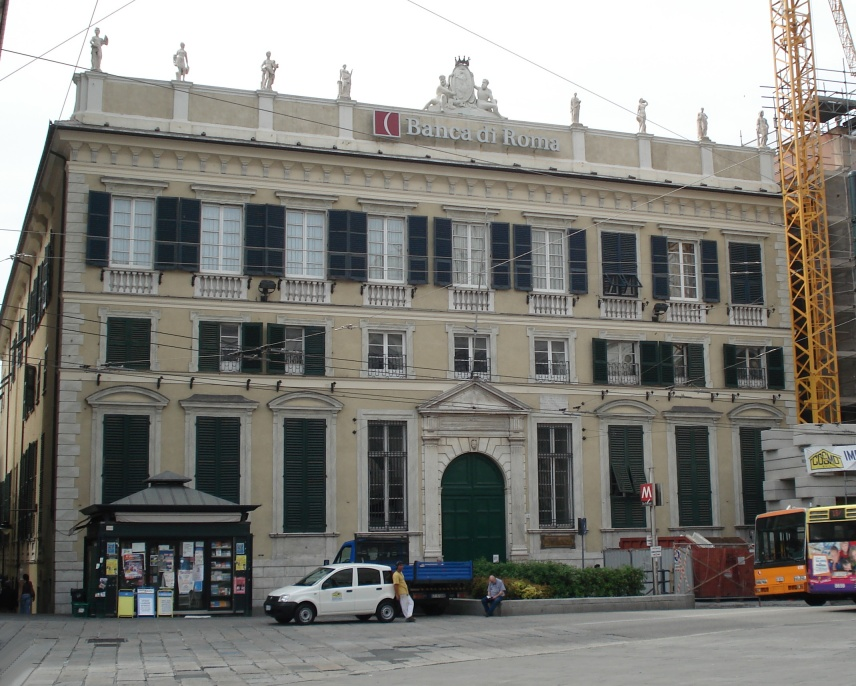
Palace De Ferrari

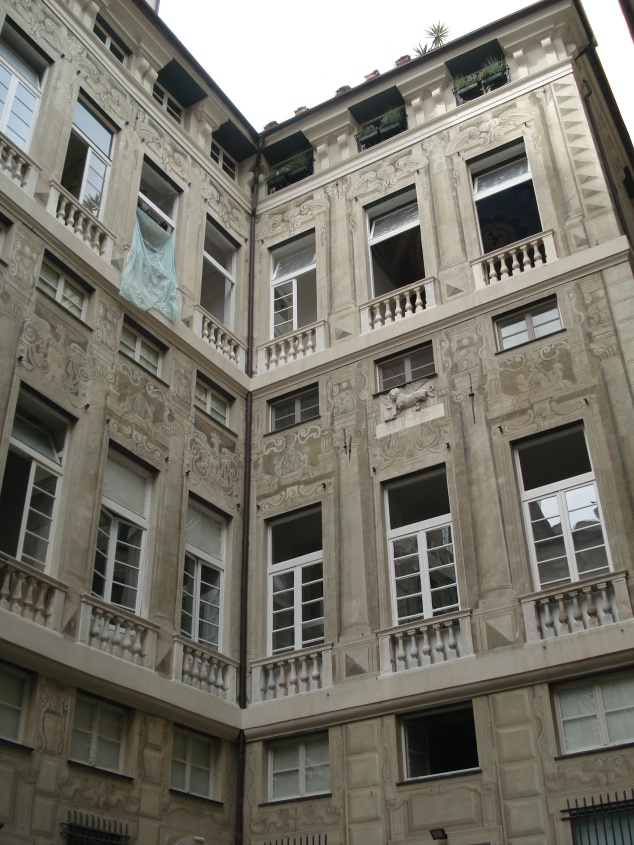
Palace Marcantonio Giustiniani

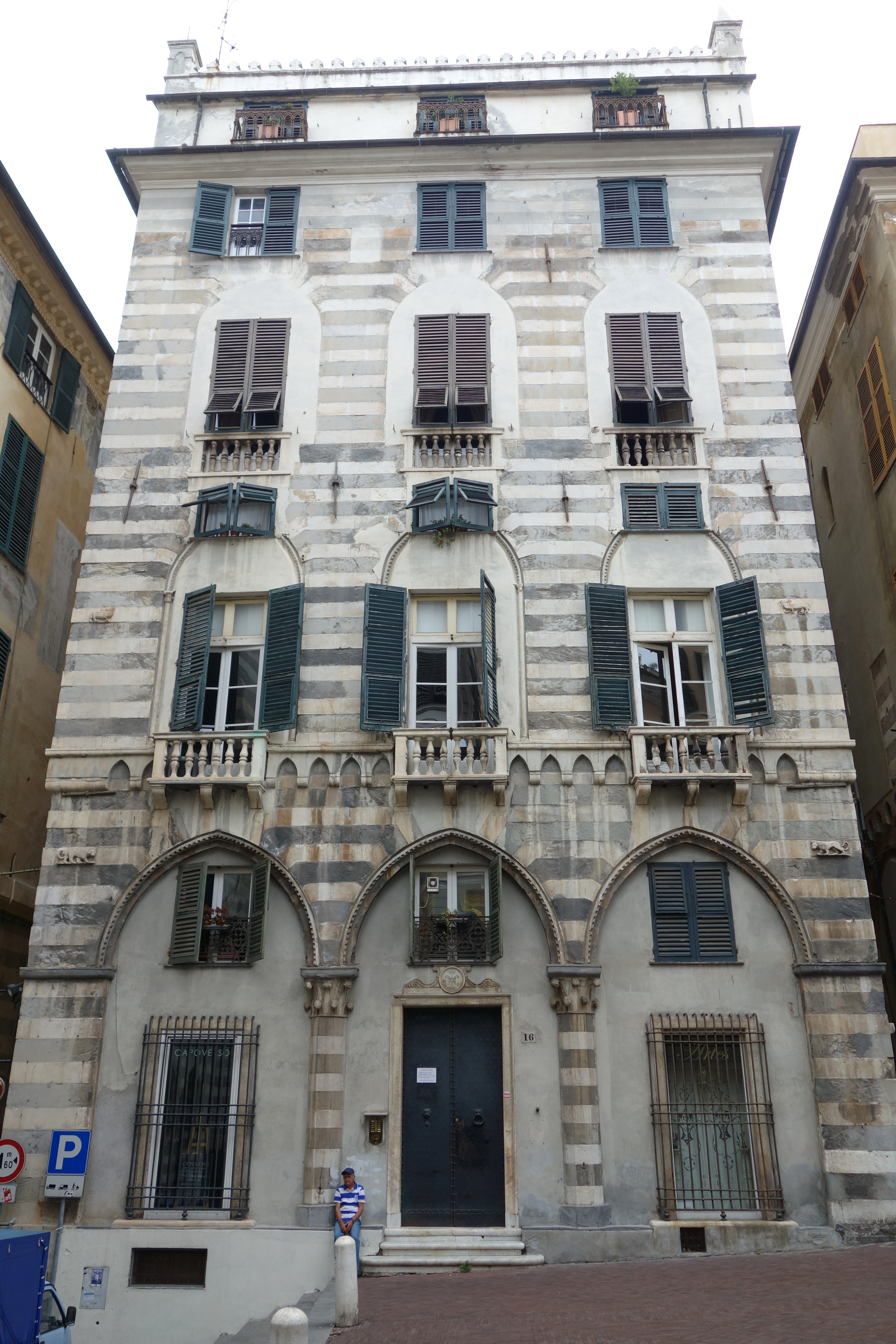
Palace Giorgio Doria

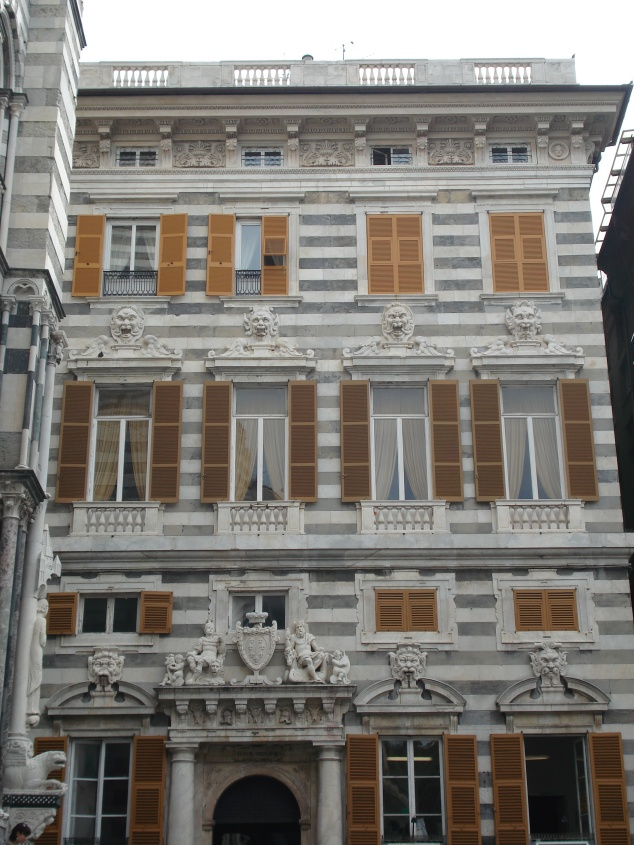
Palace De Ferrari-Ravaschieri

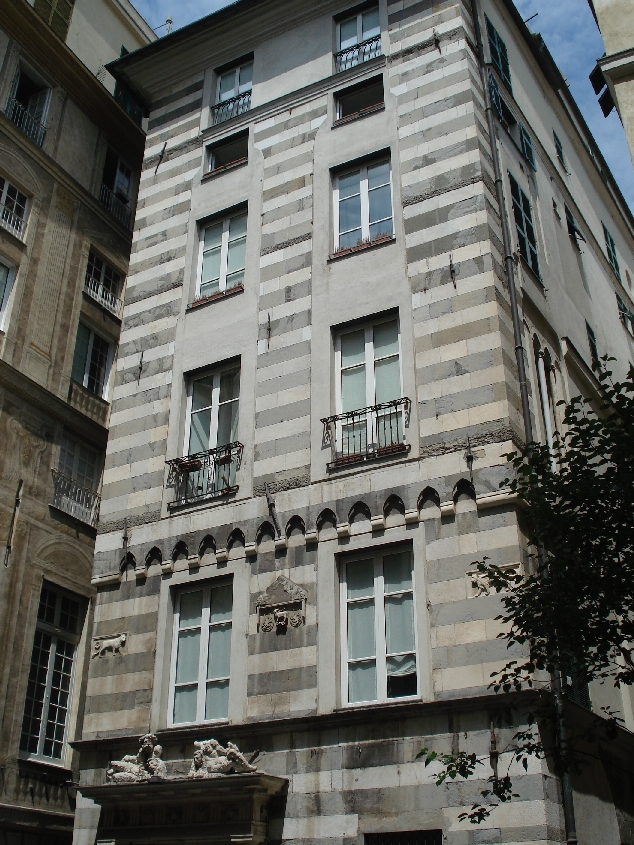
Palace Agostino e Giacomo Salvago

=== Other buildings ===
- Embriaco's tower, possessed by the family of Embriaco, is one of the few remaining of the many towers that in the Middle Ages characterized the old town of Genoa. The tower, part of Embriaco's citadel on the top of the hill of Castello, is 41 m tall and is built of large rusticated stones.
- Executioner's House (Italian: Casa del boia), in Cavour square, is a 13th-century house, traditionally believed to be the house of the executioner, as close to the place of executions. Now it hosts a small museum of medieval armours and weapons.
- Warehouses of Plenty (Italian: Magazzini dell'Abbondanza), in Molo street, were built in the 16th century as tra il 1556 e il 1567, to store grain in times of plenty (hence the name) and distribute it in times of famine. The building was used for this purpose till the end of the 19th century, now restored by Renzo Piano hosts cultural and educational initiatives.
- Architecture department is on the top of the hill of Castello, in the place where in the Middle Ages there was the bishop's fortified palace and later the monastery of St. Silvestro, destroyed by bombings during World War II. The red brick building, designed by Ignazio Gardella, incorporates some remains of the ancient monastery, including the bell-tower of the church.
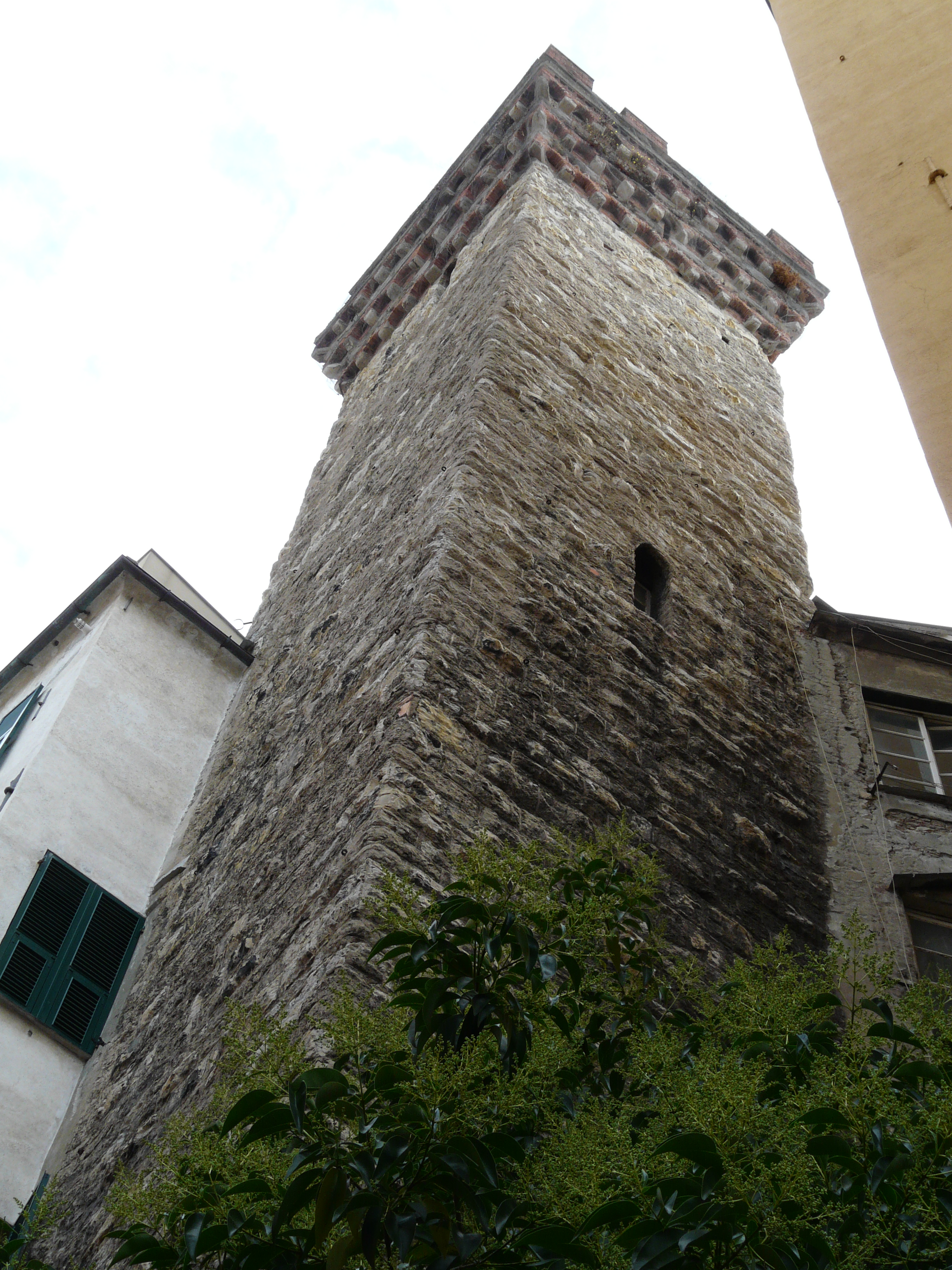
Embriaco's tower

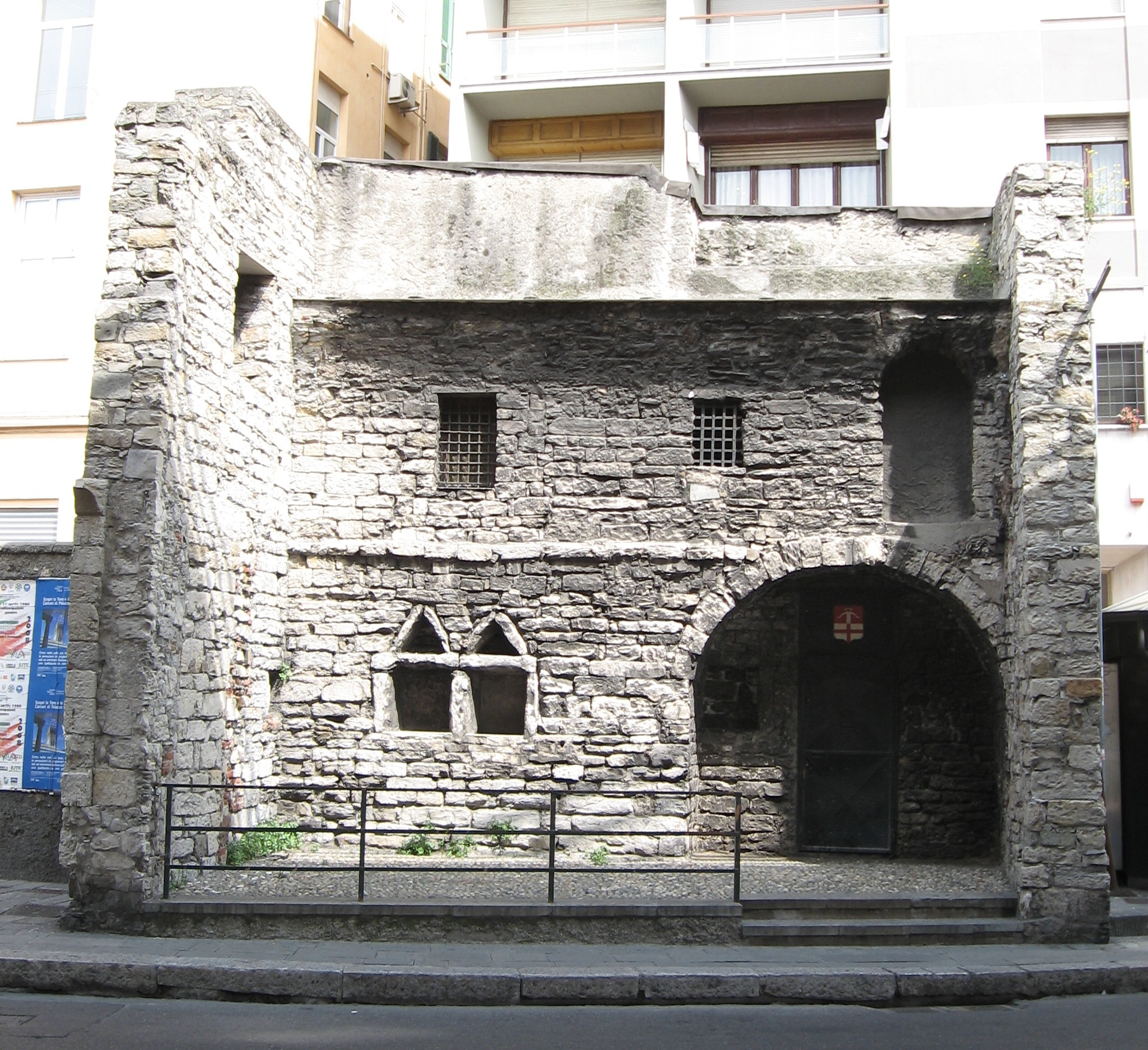
Casa del Boia

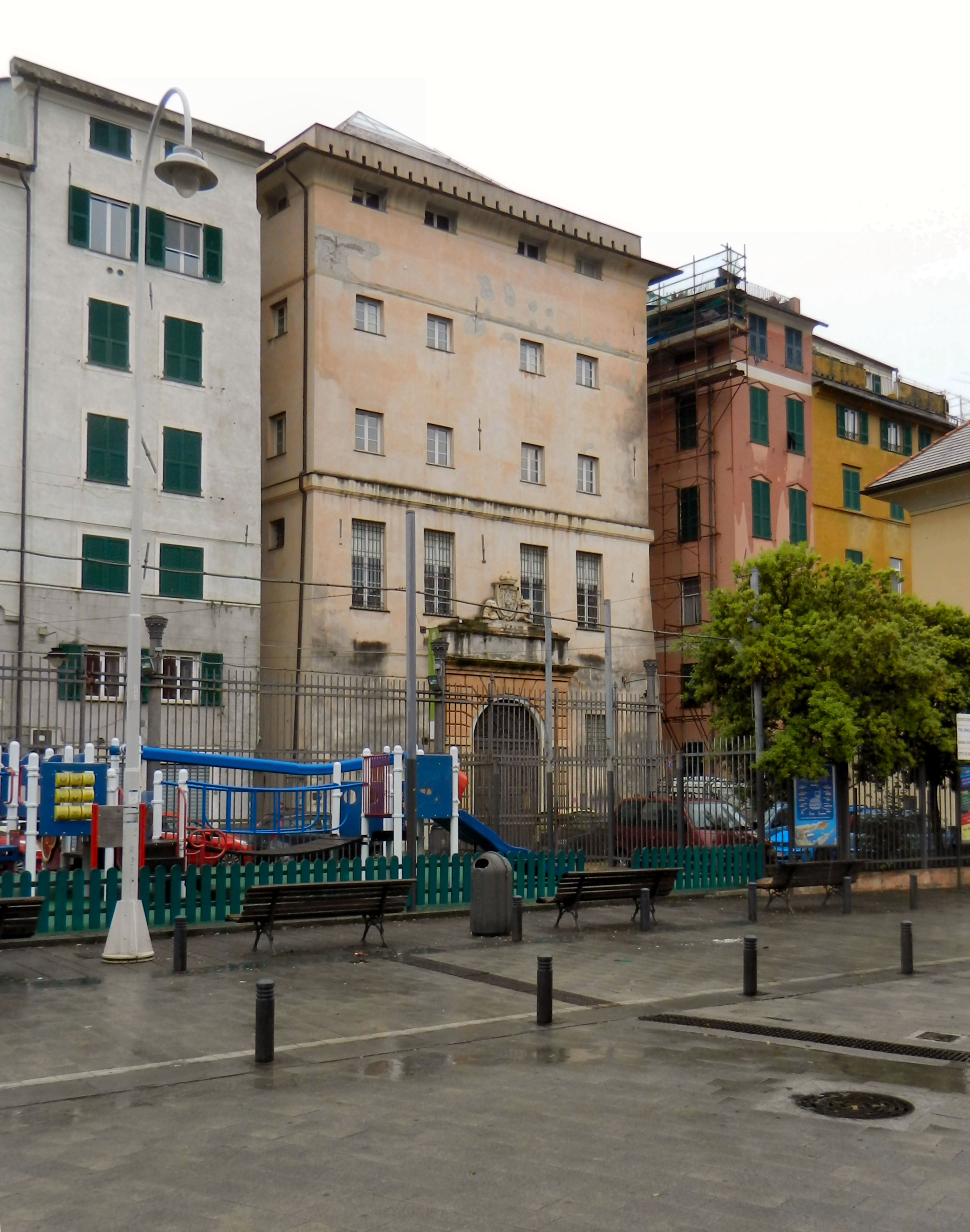
Magazzini dell'Abbondanza

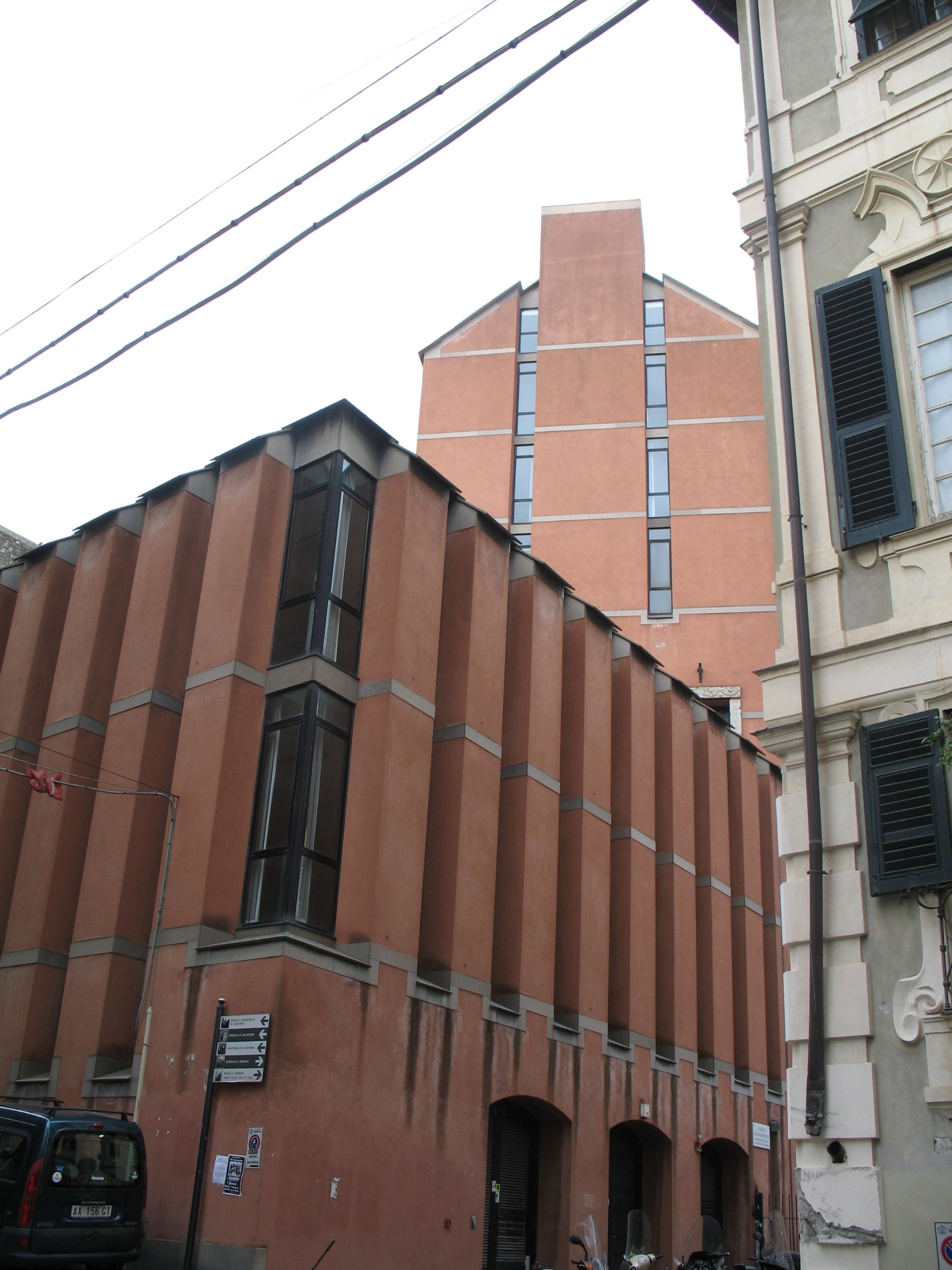
Architecture department of Genoa University

=== Old harbour ===
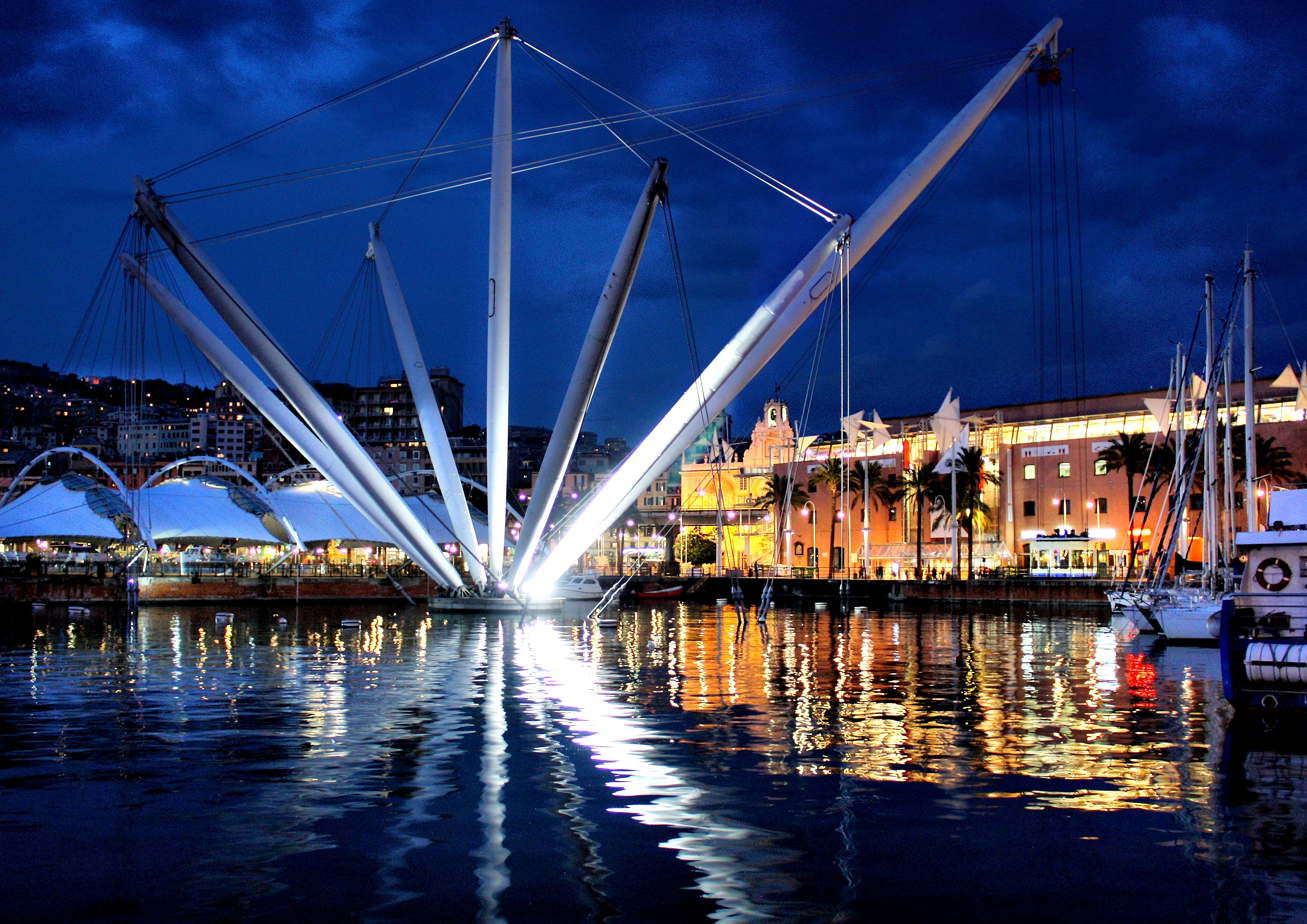
Night view of old harbour

The three neighbourhoods of the old town of Genoa overlook the old harbour. The part related to Molo includes:

- Piazzale Mandraccio, the area of the natural cove that had been the oldest harbour, filled at the end of the 19th century.
- The "Molo Vecchio" (Old Pier) with the "cotton warehouses" ("Magazzini del Cotone") built in 1869 and used till the mid 20th century.
- Embriaco's pier, front of St. George palace, where are the "Bigo", a panoramic rotating lift designed by Renzo Piano, modeled after the ancient harbour's cranes and a tensile structure that covers the Piazza delle Feste, where in winter is an ice skating rink and in other seasons shows and events are held.
- Some buildings which made up of Portofranco.

In the Middle Ages the harbour was strictly linked to the city, but in 1536 new city walls were built that divided for a long time the city and the port. Only in 1992, being unused this part of the port, in the meantime enlarged towards the west, this area was redeveloped by Renzo Piano and opened to public access during Genoa Expo '92 exhibition.

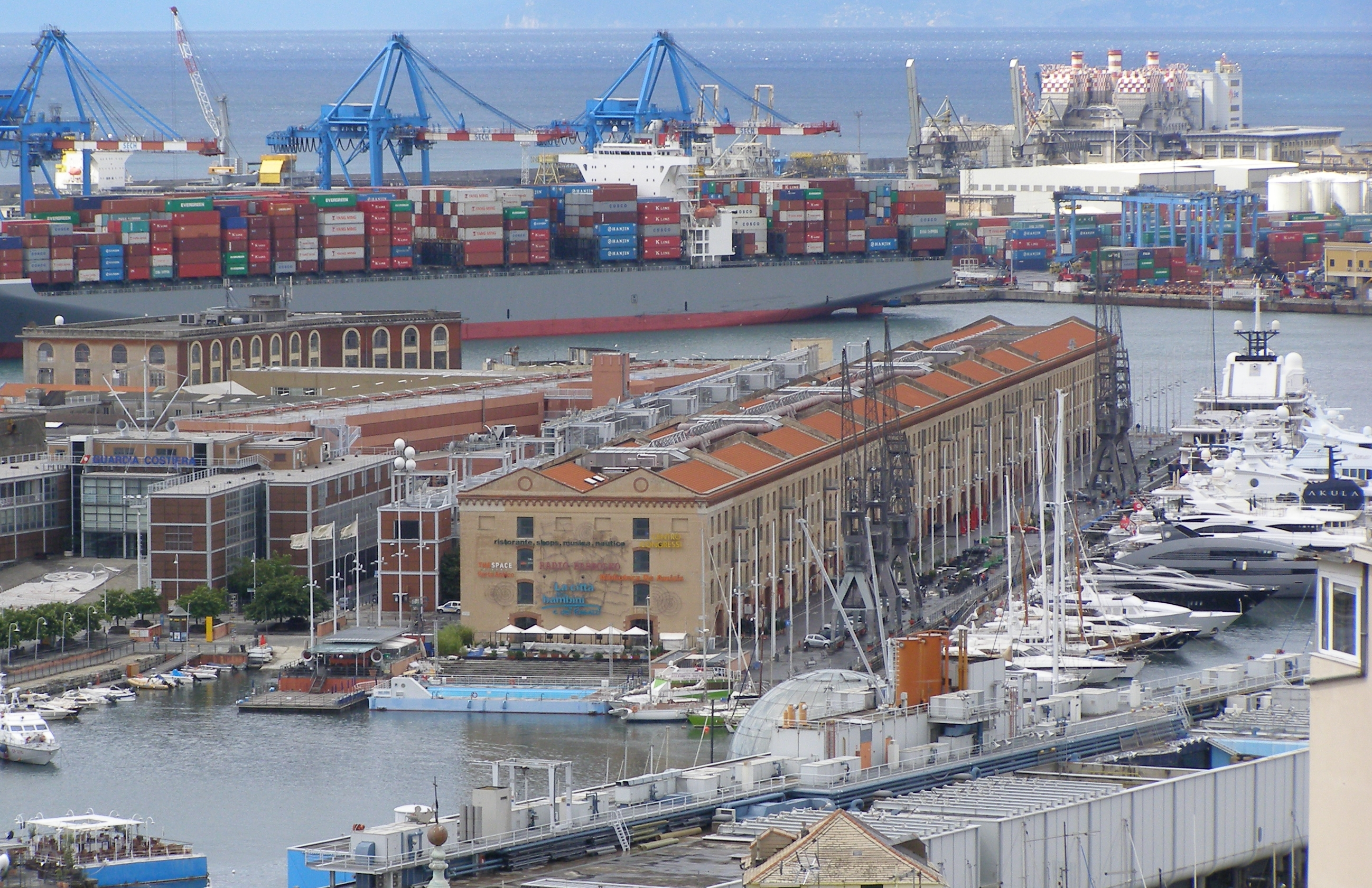
Magazzini del cotone (Cotton warehouses)

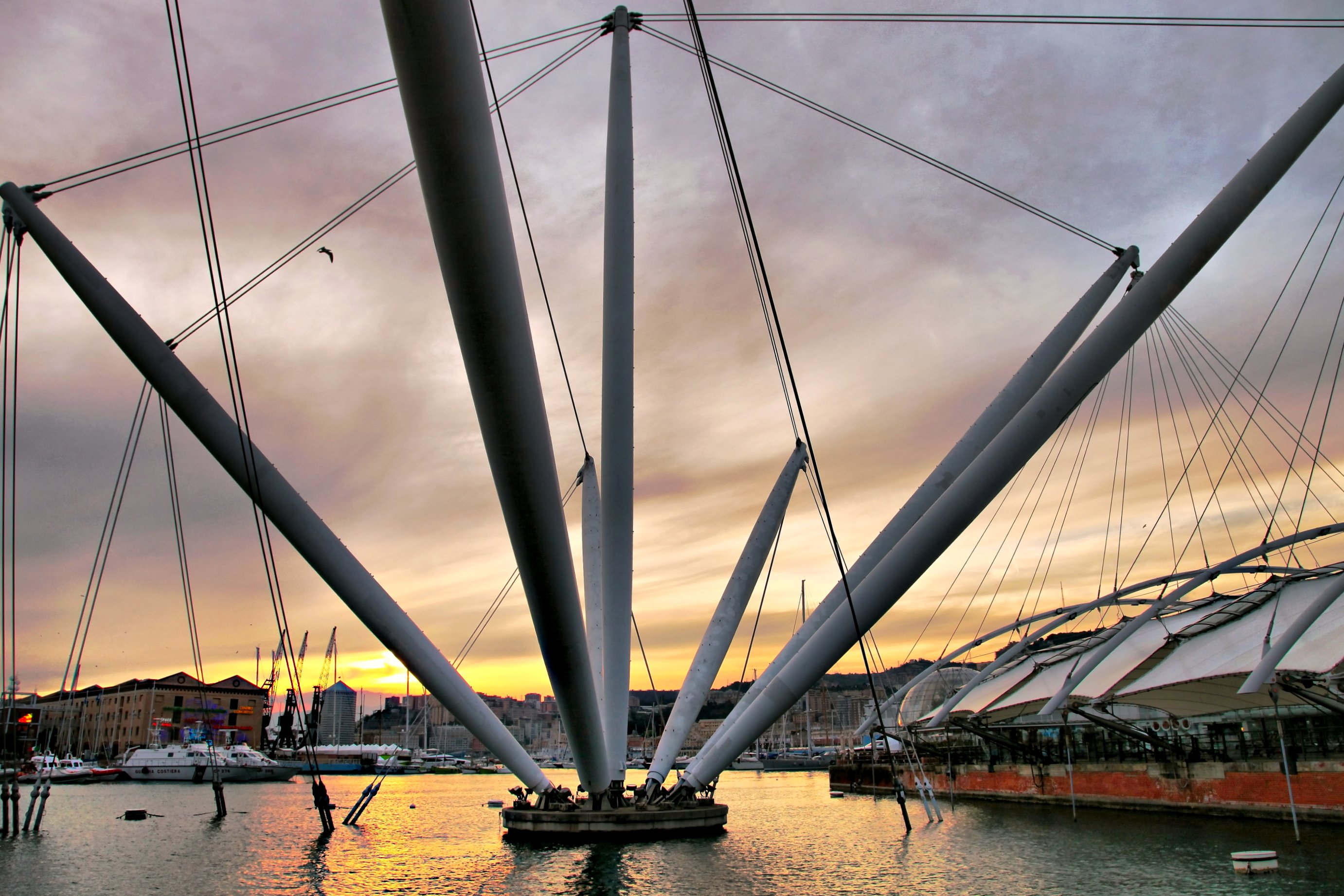
The Bigo

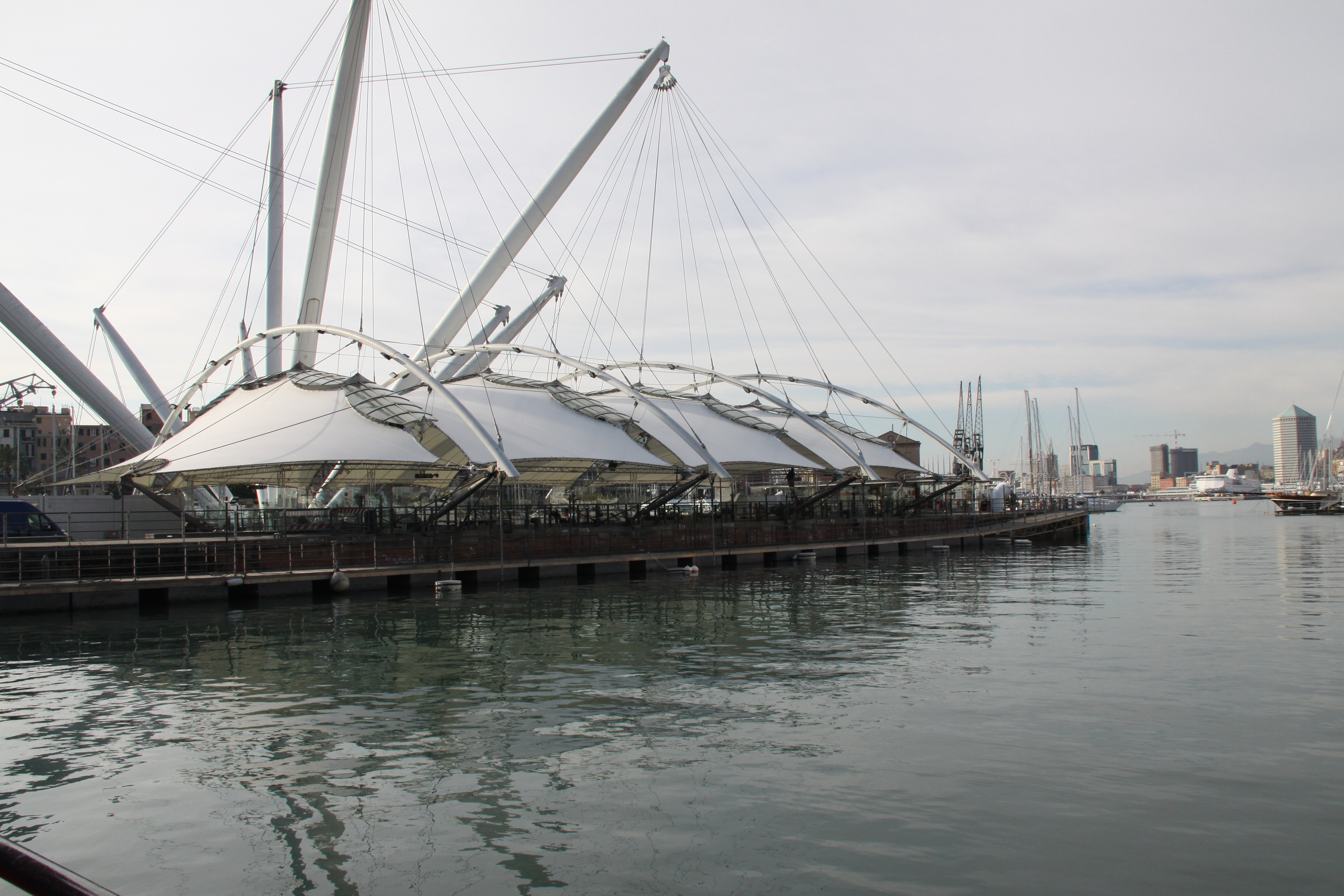
The tensile structure of Embriaco's pier

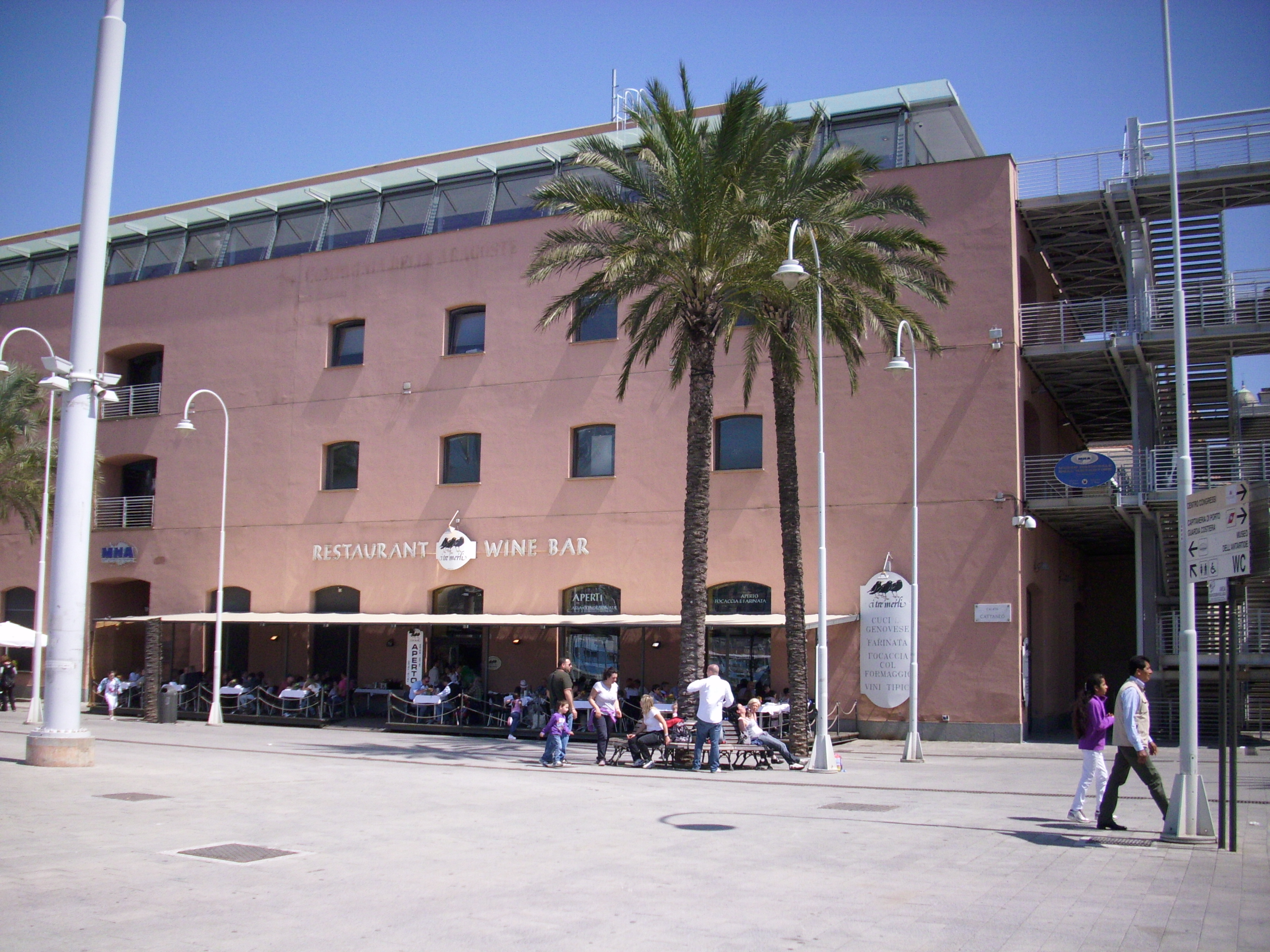
Millo building

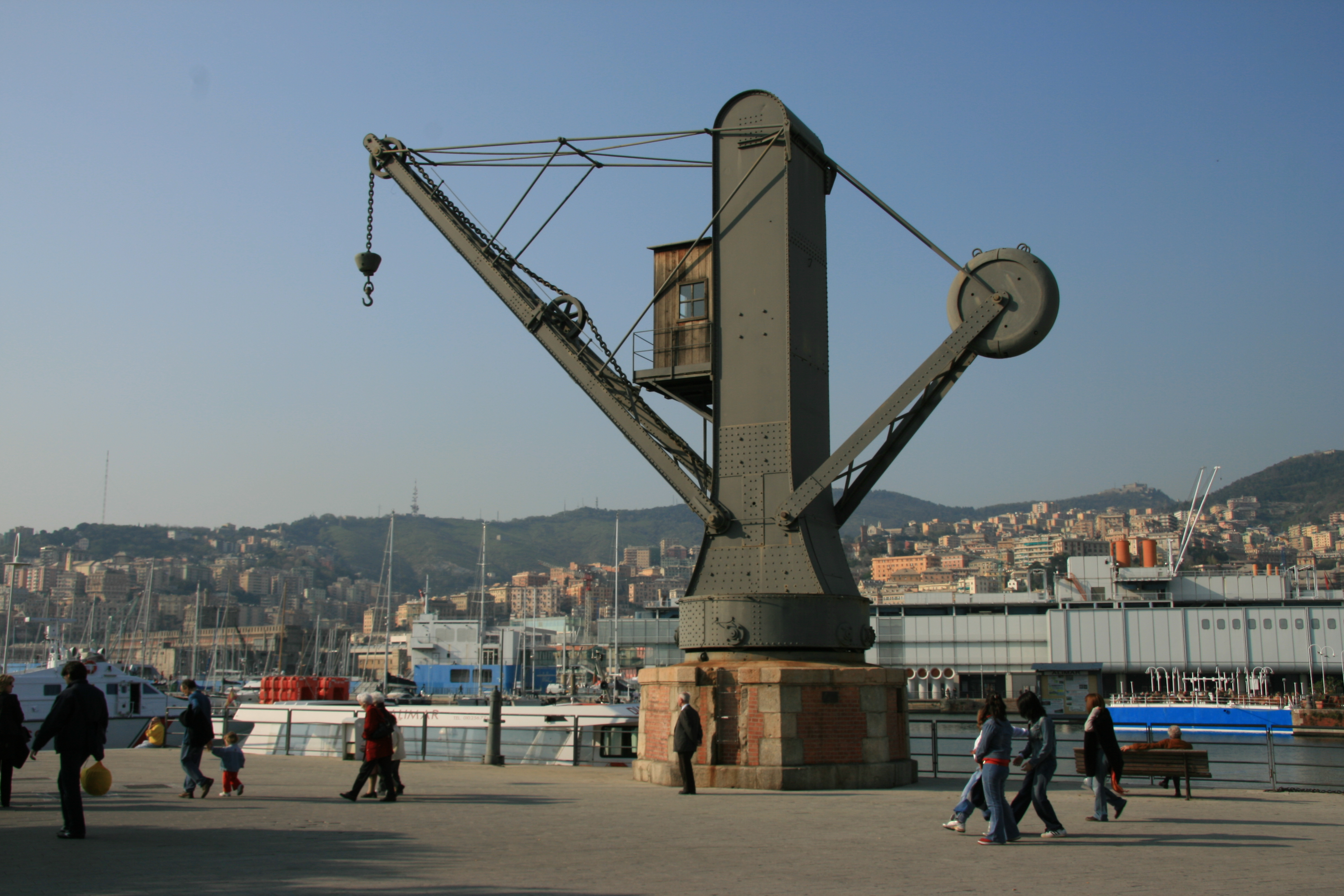
19th century Tannet & Walker crane

=== City walls and gates ===
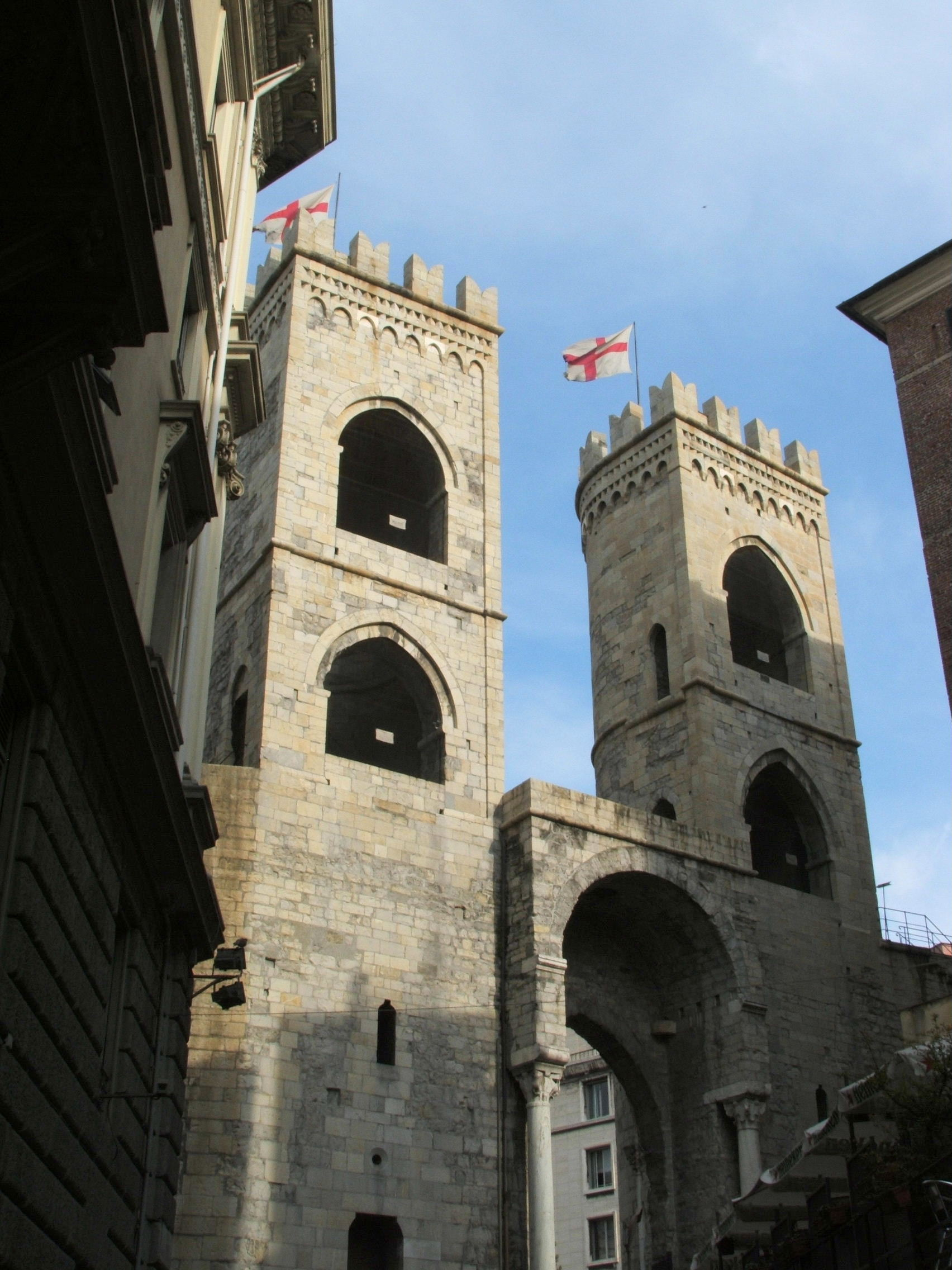
Porta Soprana

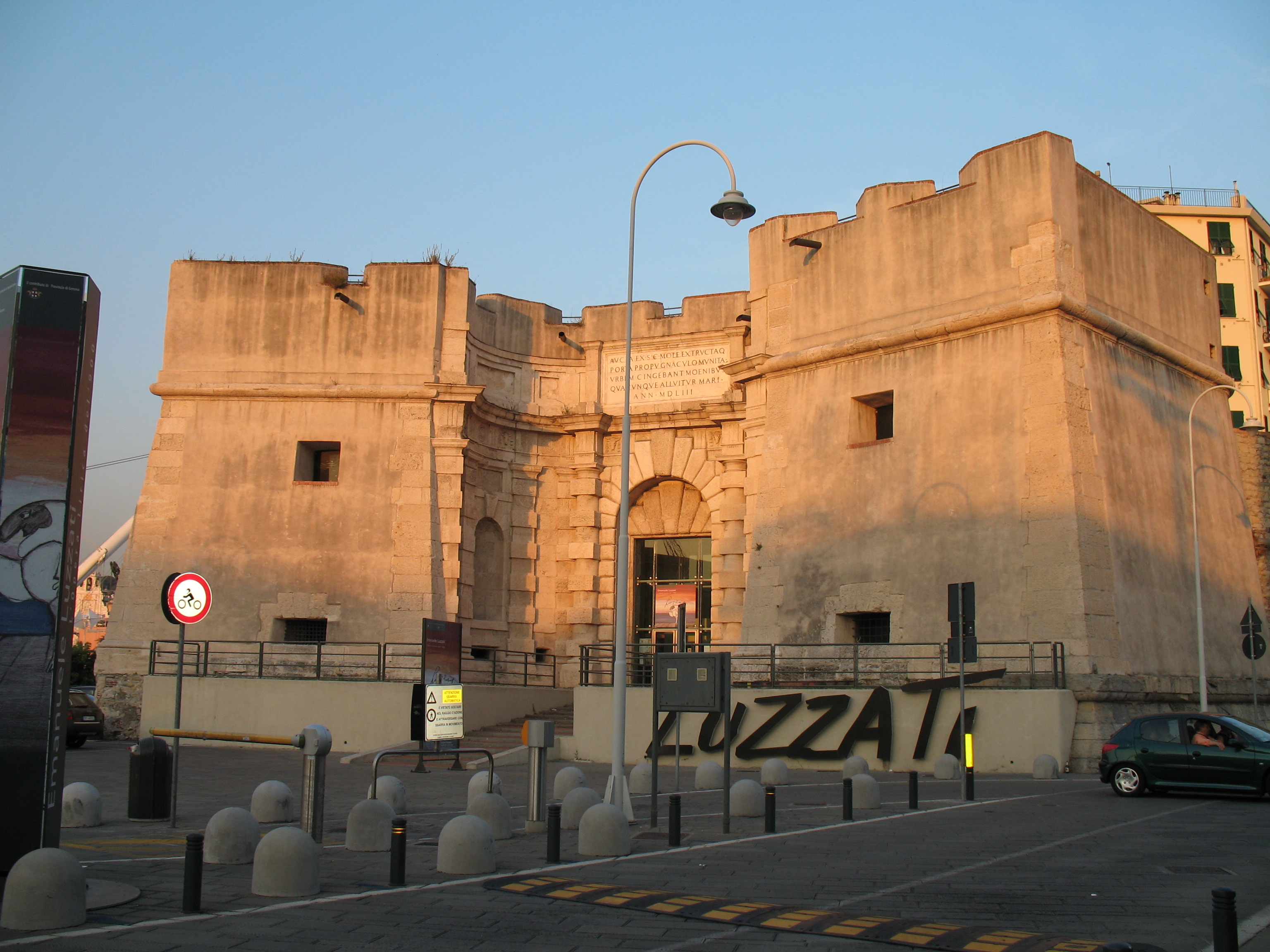
Porta Siberia

Almost nothing remains of the oldest city wall, called "Carolingian" (9th century), but large section of the 12th century Barbarossa's walls are well preserved (Grazie and Marina walls). Some remains on the east side of the hill of Castello ("Murette del Colle") came to light after the World War II bombing that destroyed the houses in which they were incorporated. The best known gate in Barbarossa's walls is Porta Soprana on the border between the neighbourhoods of Molo and Portoria; this gate, restored at the end of the 19th century and again in 1938, has a monumental look, with high semicircular towers.

In the 13th century the Old Pier peninsula was also included inside the walls, completing by this the fortifications on the sea side of the city. Large part of these fortifications, strengthened in the 16th century, are at present well preserved, and include Malapaga and Marinetta walls, with the city gate named "Porta Siberia", designed by Galeazzo Alessi (1553), which was at that time the main access to the harbour. It is considered a masterpiece of 16th century military architecture. This gate was called "Porta Cibaria" because through it passed the food stocks landed in the port (from Italian "cibo", food), later corrupted in "Siberia". Nowadays it houses inside a museum dedicated to the Genoese painter and scenographer Emanuele Luzzati (1921–2007).

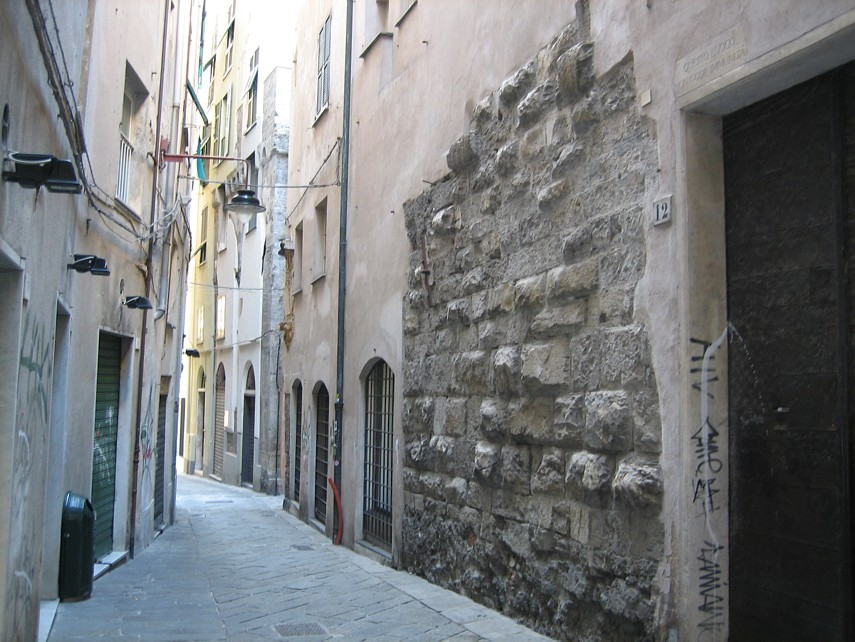
Sole remains of Carolingian walls in Tommaso Reggio street, close to the cathedral

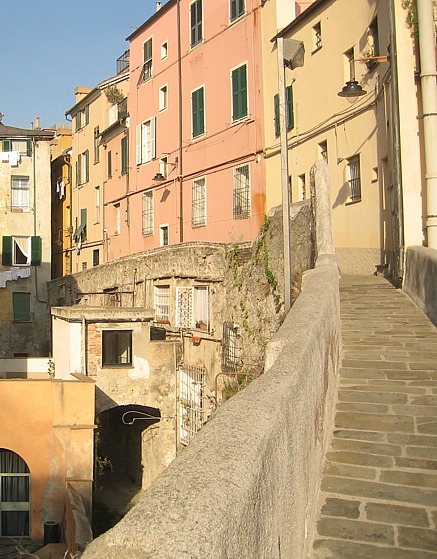
"Murette" del Colle of Barbarossa's walls

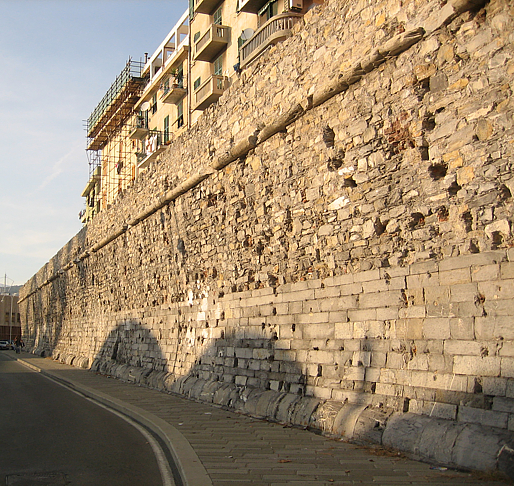
Malapaga walls

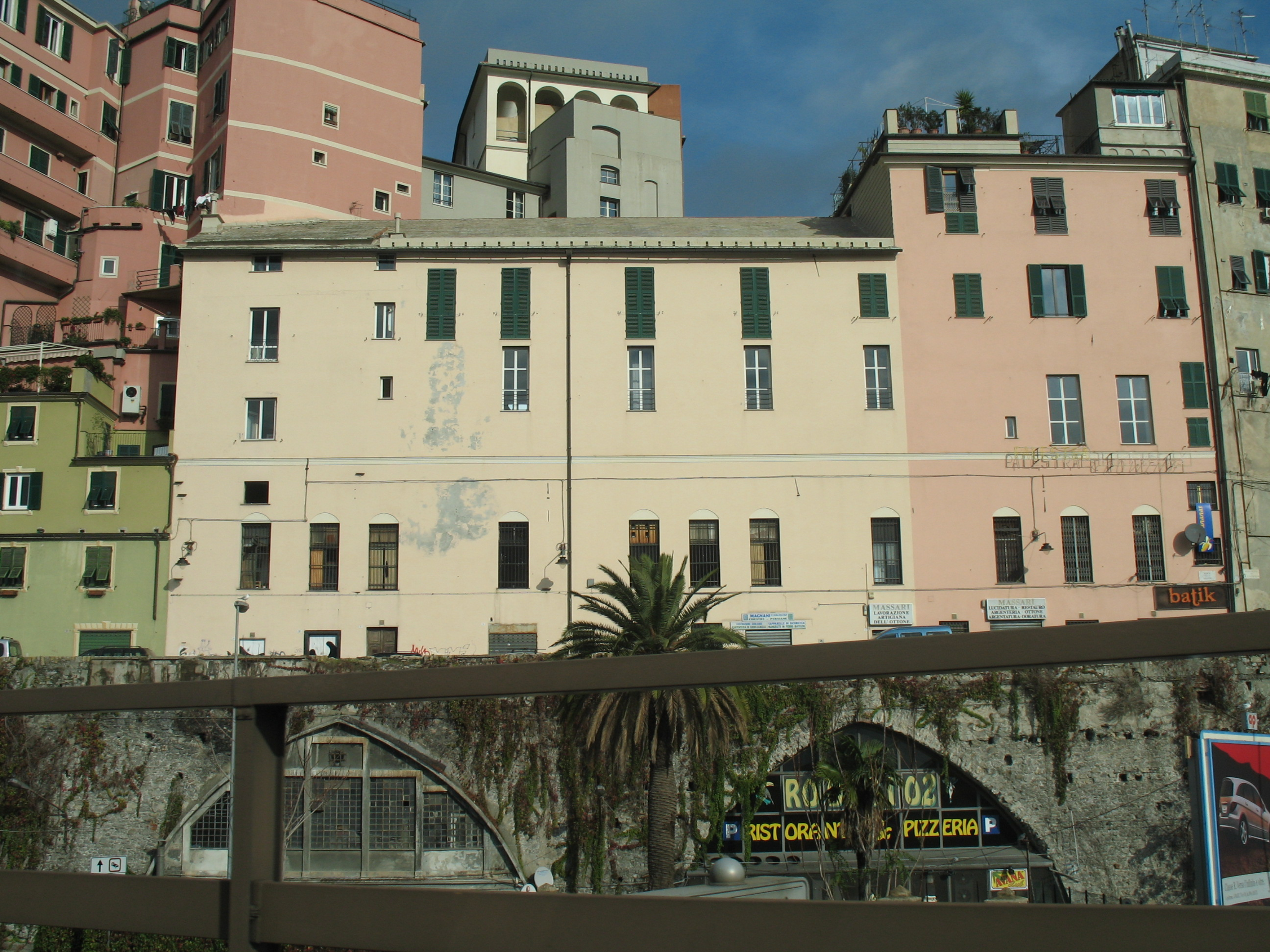
Grazie walls

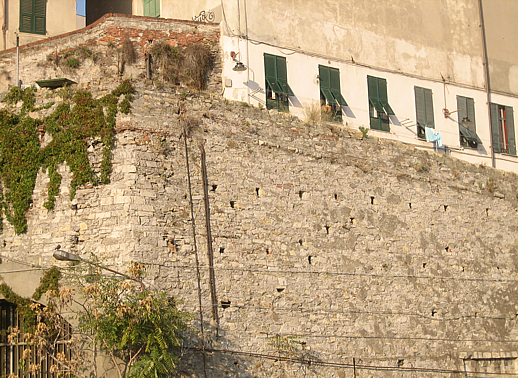
Marina walls

=== Museums ===
- Museum of the Treasury of St. Lawrence cathedral is housed in the basement of the Archbishop's courtyard. The layout of the museum was designed in 1956 by Franco Albini. The museum preserves the heritage of art works and silverware of the cathedral, processional statues, monstrances and reliquaries, including that containing the purported remains of John the Baptist (15th century) and the "Sacro Catino" (Sacred Bowl), traditionally believed to be used in the Last Supper, in truth a 9th-century Islamic art object, brought to Genoa by Guglielmo Embriaco after the conquest of Cesarea.
- Museum of Sant'Agostino is housed in the former monastery of Sant'Agostino, restored in 1980s by Franco Albini and Franca Helg, where art works from Genoese churches no longer existing are preserved, among which the remains of the funerary monument of Margaret of Brabant, of Giovanni Pisano (1313).
- Diocesan Museum. Close to the cathedral, in the cloister of St. Lawrence Canons there is the Diocesan Museum, where archaeological finds of Roman and Medieval period, paintings from the 14th to 17th century, vestments and liturgical objects are preserved.
- Museum of Santa Maria di Castello. Inside the monastery of Santa Maria di Castello a collection of archaeological finds and art works is preserved; in the upper loggia of the second cloister there is a fresco depicting an Annunciation by Joos von Ravensburg (1451).
- Luzzati Museum, housed inside Porta Siberia, where since 2001 many of the major works by the artist Emanuele Luzzati are shown.

== Places of Worship ==
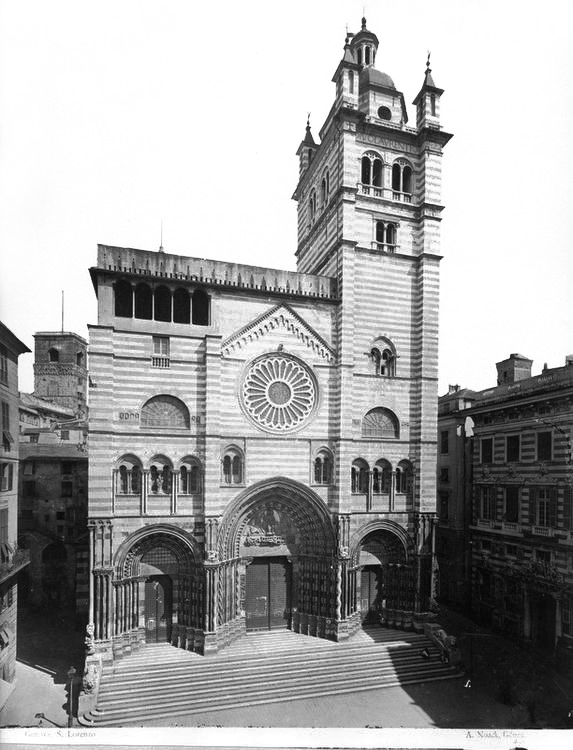
19th century photo of the cathedral, by the photographer Alfred Noack

In the neighbourhood are the cathedral, devoted to Saint Lawrence and some of the oldest churches of Genoa.

=== Cathedral of Saint Lawrence ===
The present church was built at the beginning of the 12th century and consecrated by pope Gelasius II in 1118, but a preceding church, that would have been in this site since the 6th century, became the cathedral in the second half of the 10th century, when the bishop's seat moved here from the basilica of St. Syrus, located outside of the city walls, so prone to Saracen forays.

The construction, including the restoration after a fire in 1296, was completed only in the 16th century with the raising of the dome and the bell tower. The church has a Romanesque structure, but the façade, built in the 13th century, is in Genoese gothic style, with the typical cladding in black and white stripes and three elaborate portals.

=== Other Catholic churches ===
- Santa Maria di Castello is located almost on the top of Castello hill. According to the tradition it was built in the 6th century but it is documented since the 11th century and was rebuilt in Romanesque in the 12th century. In the church and in the adjacent museum many art work of the main Genoese artists are preserved.
- San Matteo, founded in 1125, was the seigneurial church of Doria family, whose palaces surround the little square in front of the church. It was rebuilt in Gothic style in the 13th century and in 16th century Andrea Doria had it restored the interior in Renaissance style. In the crypt there are the tombs of Andrea Doria and other members of the Doria family.
- San Donato, the best example of Romanesque architecture in Genoa, was built in the 11th century, but a preceding church existed in this site since the 7th century. Over the centuries it has undergone few changes and still retains the original Romanesque appearance. The simple façade has a stone cladding in black and white stripes. The church has an unusual octagonal bell tower. Inside the church many art work are preserved, including the triptych depicting the Adoration of the Magi by Joos van Cleve and a Madonna and Child by Nicolò da Voltri
- * San Marco al Molo is located near to the Old Harbour. It was built in the 12th century in Romanesque style, but changed to Baroque style in the 17th century. Originally it was the church of the port but when in the 16th century the city walls were renewed, it was separated from the quays and became a parish church. It has a very simple architectural structure.
- Santi Cosma e Damiano, in Romanesque style, was built in the 11th century and restored after the damage caused by the French naval bombing of 1684.
- San Torpete was built in the 12th century by the Pisan merchants in Genoa and later became the seigneurial church of the Dalla Volta family. It was rebuilt in 1733 but the Neoclassicist façade was built only in the 19th century.
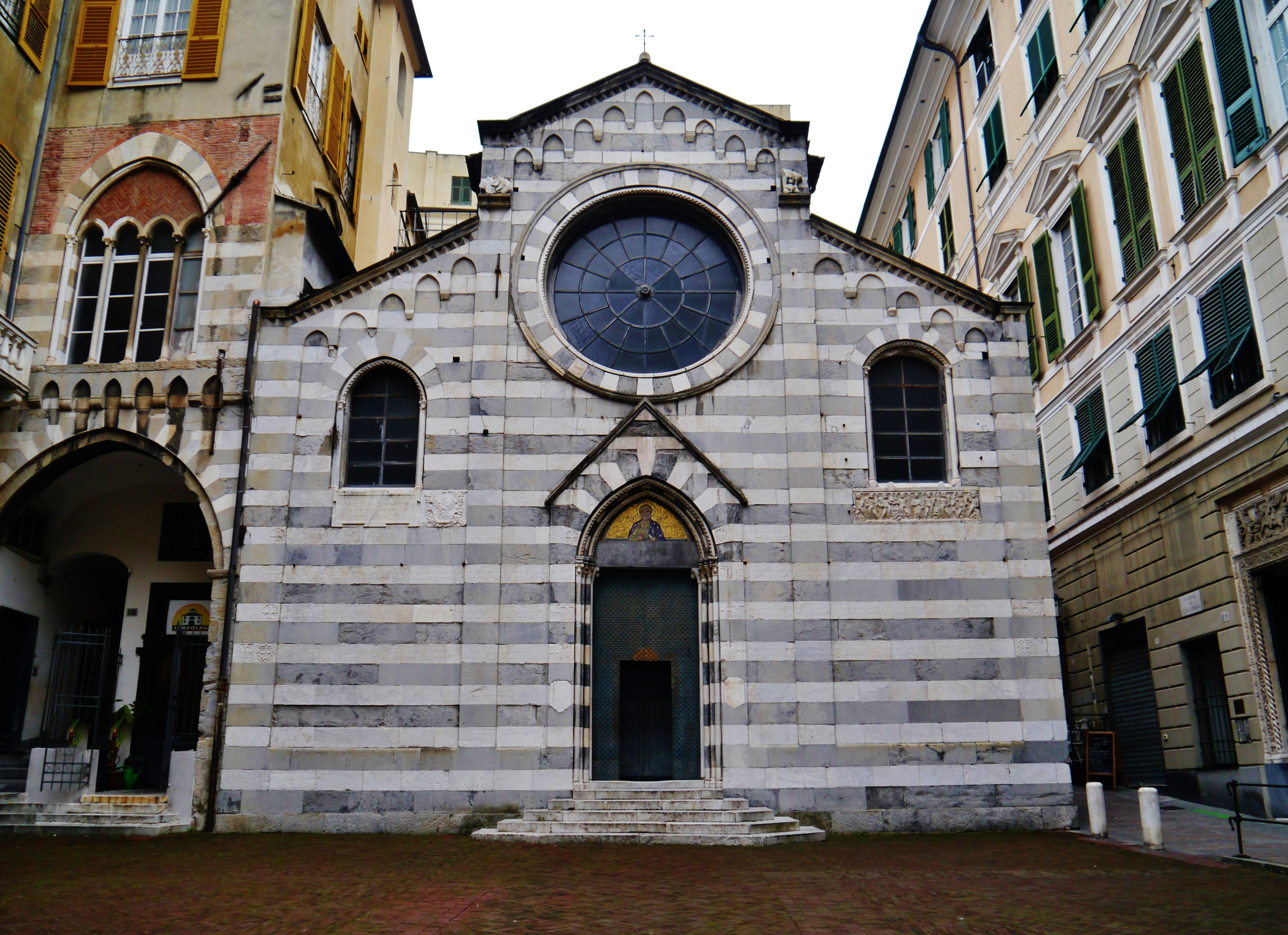
San Matteo

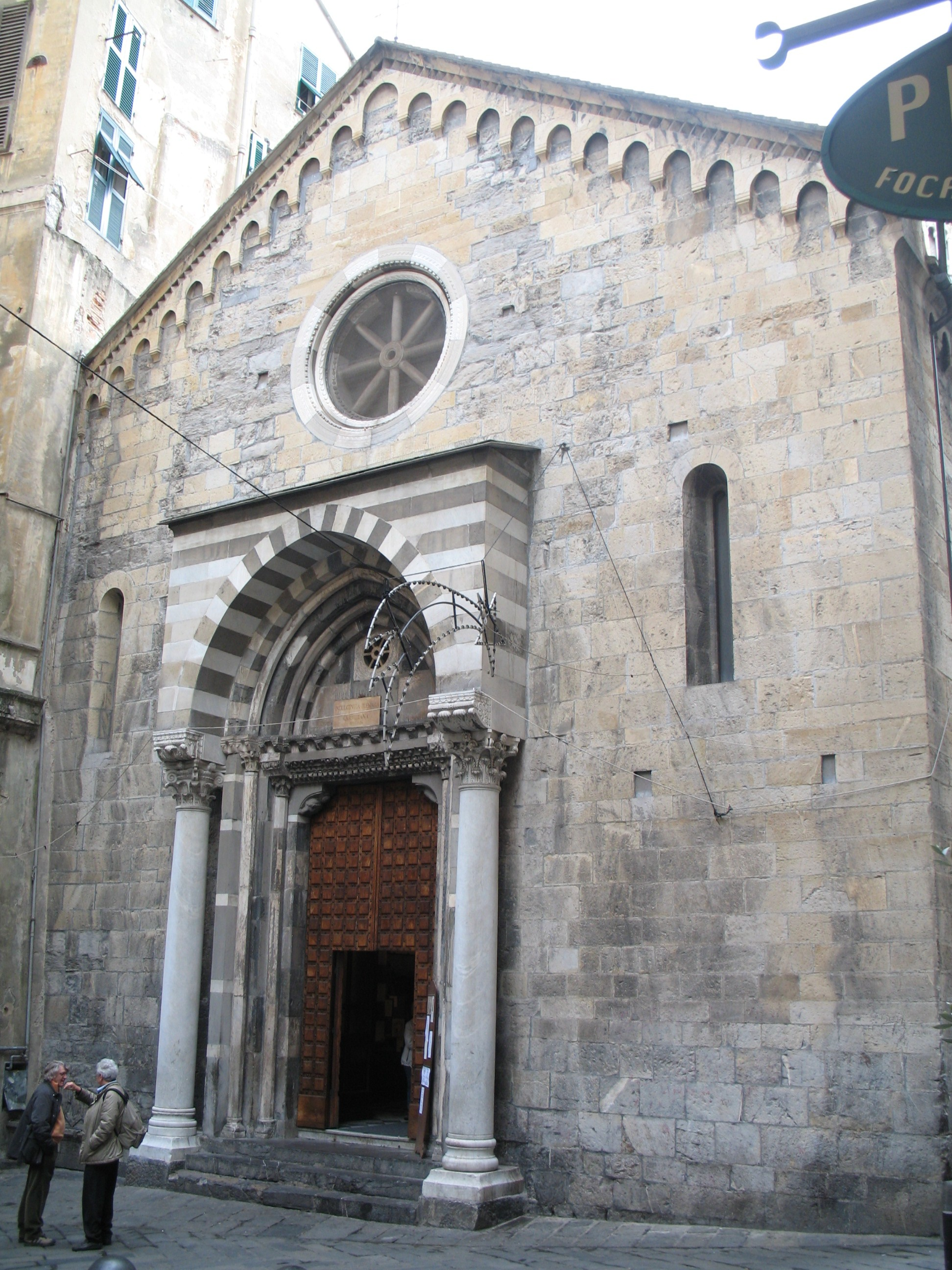
San Donato

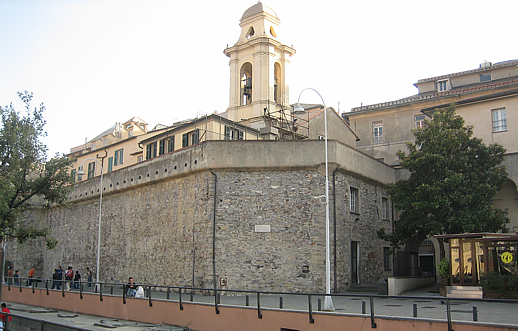
San Marco al Molo

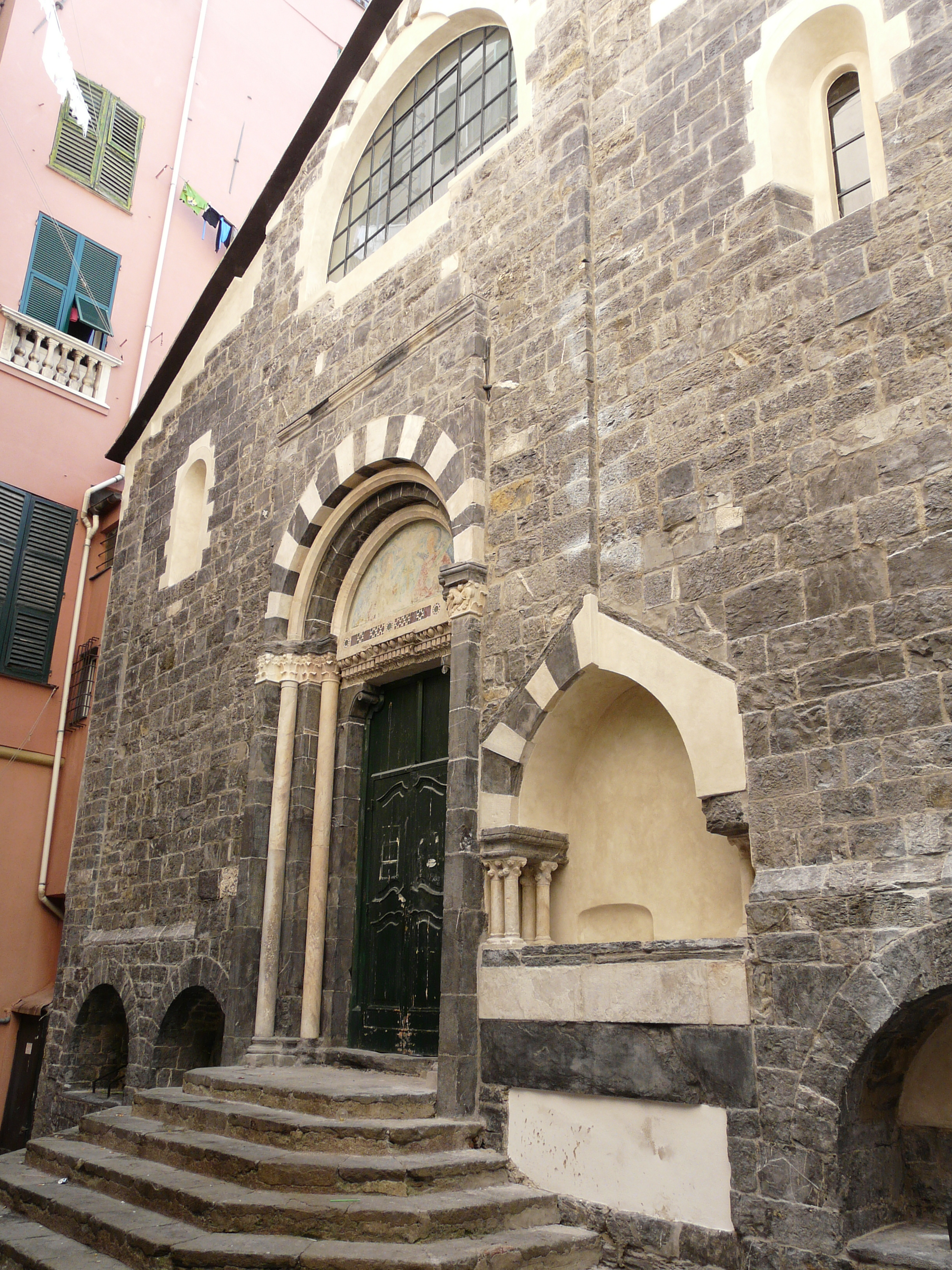
Santi Cosma e Damiano

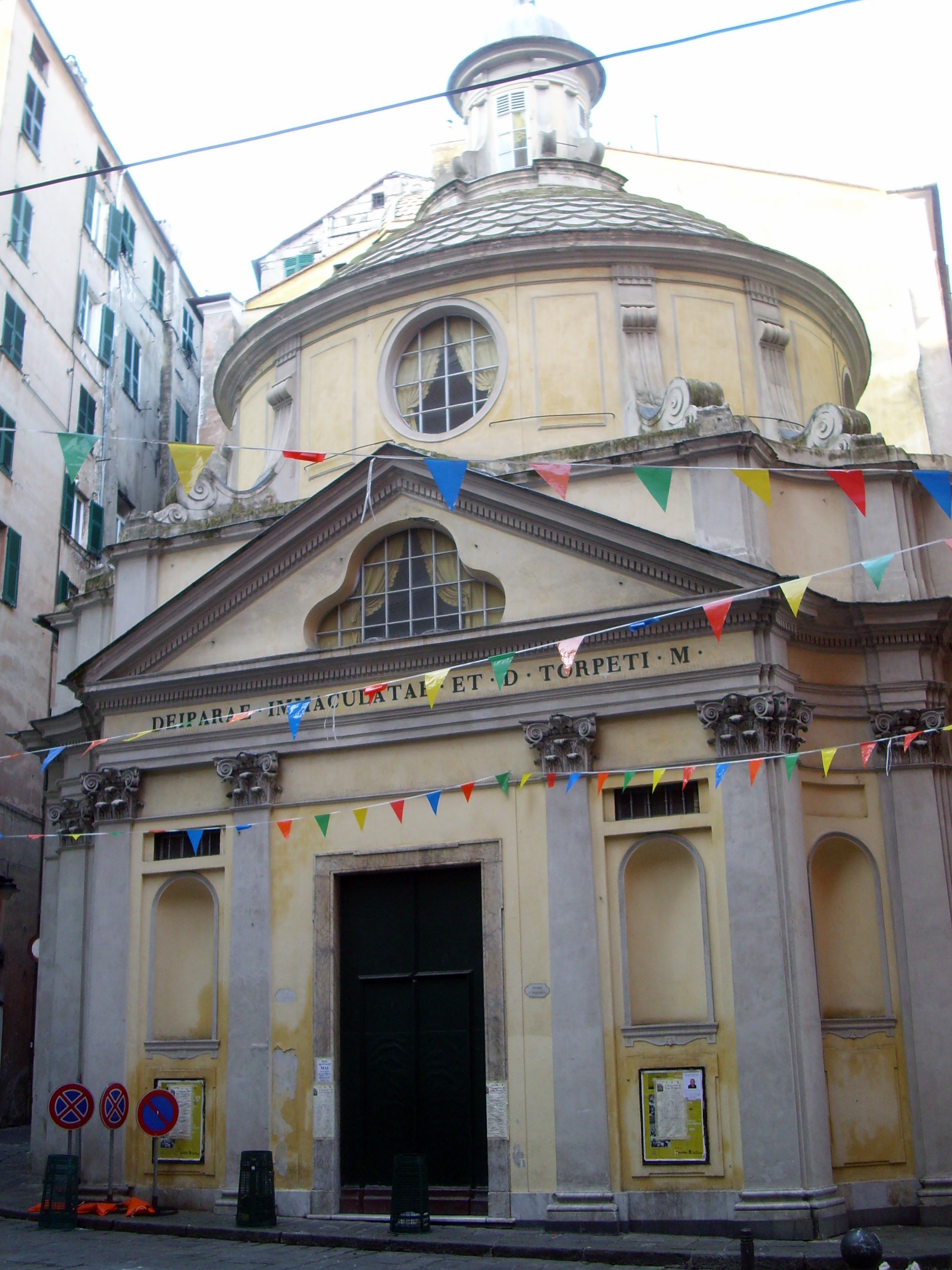
San Torpete
- San Pietro in Banchi was built by the government of the Republic of Genoa at the end of the 16th century, in fulfillment of a vow for the end of a plague epidemic. The church is elevated above the level of the square because at the ground floor some shops were built and sold to finance the construction of the church. The frescoed façade has a portico with three arches and two small bell towers on the sides. Over the church there is a large octagonal dome.
- San Giorgio is located where was the city center during the Roman and Byzantine era; it is documented since the 10th century, but it was completely rebuilt in the 17th century by the Theatines. Like the adjoining church of San Torpete the Neoclassicist façade was built only in the 19th century.
- Church of the Scuole Pie The "Church of Holy Name of the Blessed Virgin Mary and Guardian Angels", commonly known as "chiesa delle Scuole Pie" ("church of the Pious Schools"), is located close to the cathedral. It was built in the 18th century with an adjoining school by the Piarists. It is one of the best examples of late Baroque in Genoa. Inside the church there are frescoes and paintings by Giuseppe Galeotti and low-reliefs by Francesco Maria Schiaffino.
- Nostra Signora delle Grazie al Molo, near Cavour square, is a small marian shrine built in the 17th century in the same place where a lost chapel, devoted to the Saints Nazarius and Celsus, had existed in the 7th century.

- Oratory of San Giacomo della Marina, seat of the "Confraternity of San Giacomo della Marina", was built in the 17th century and preserves paintings of the major Genoese painter of that period.
- Oratory of Sant'Antonio Abate was built in the 17th century and at present is the seat of the parish of San Salvatore, whose church was destroyed by bombings during World War II and deconsecrated. It preserves 17th and 18th century wooden processional statues by Anton Maria Maragliano, Pasquale Navone and Domenico Bissoni.
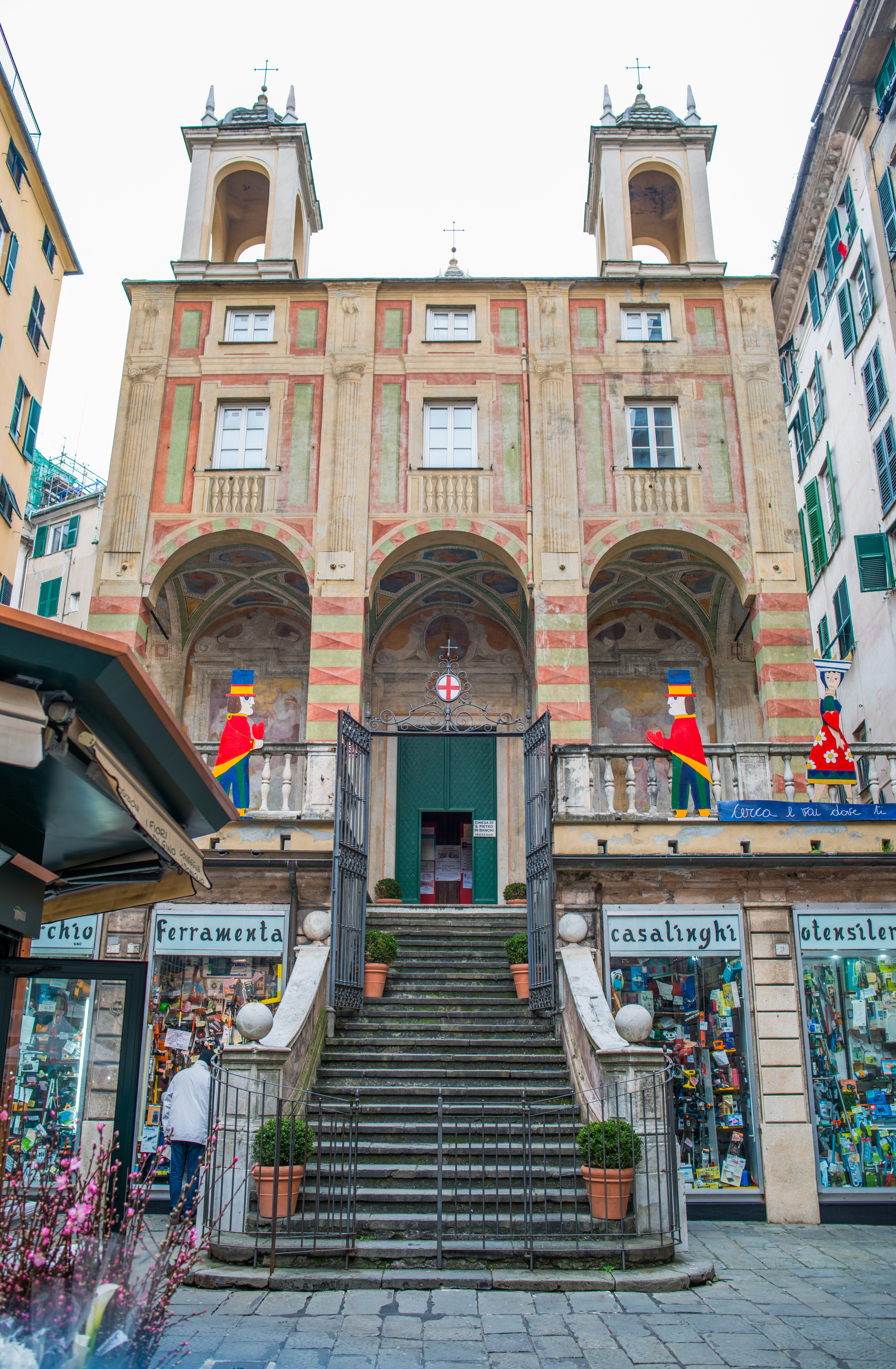
San Pietro in Banchi

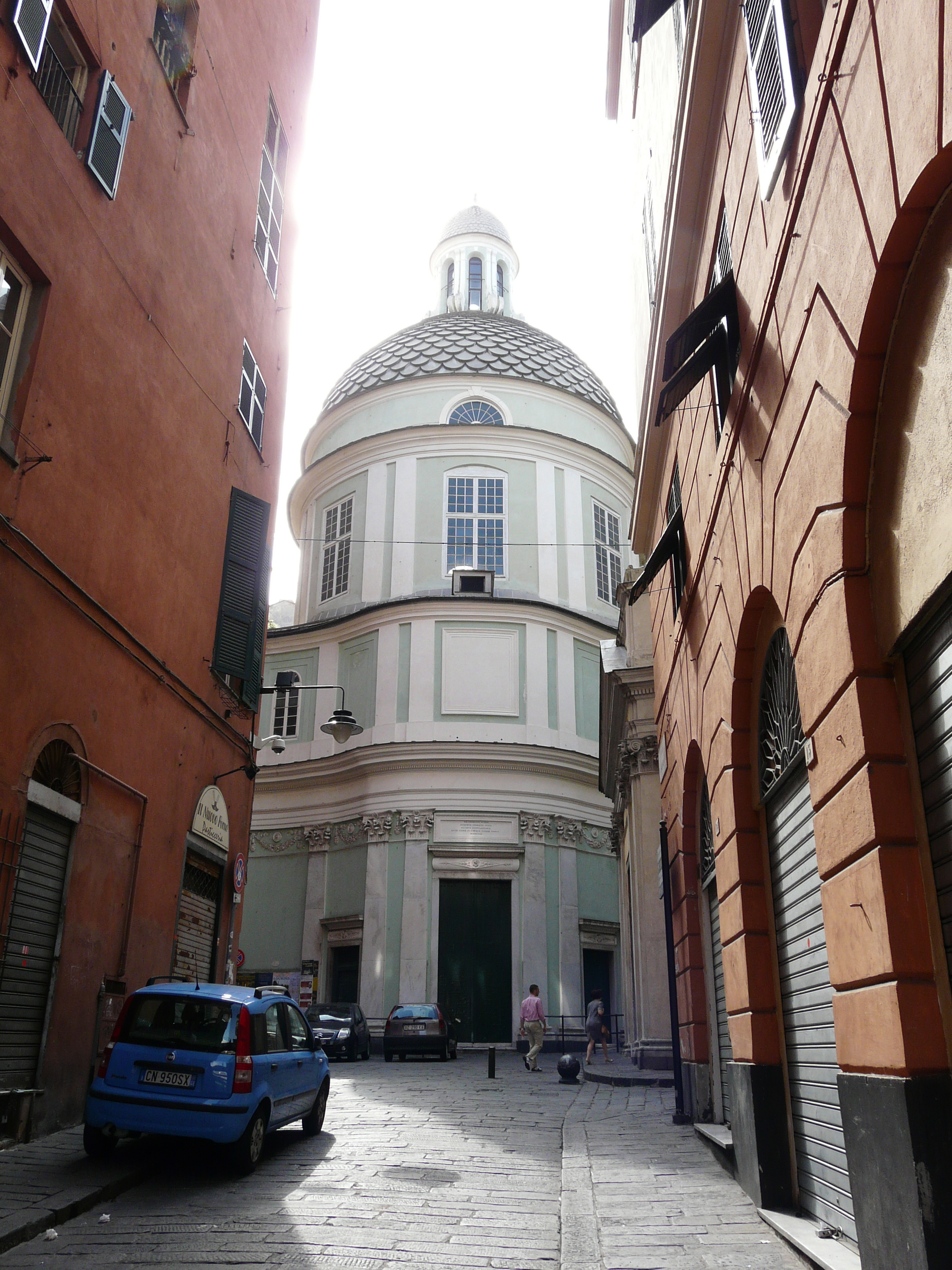
San Giorgio

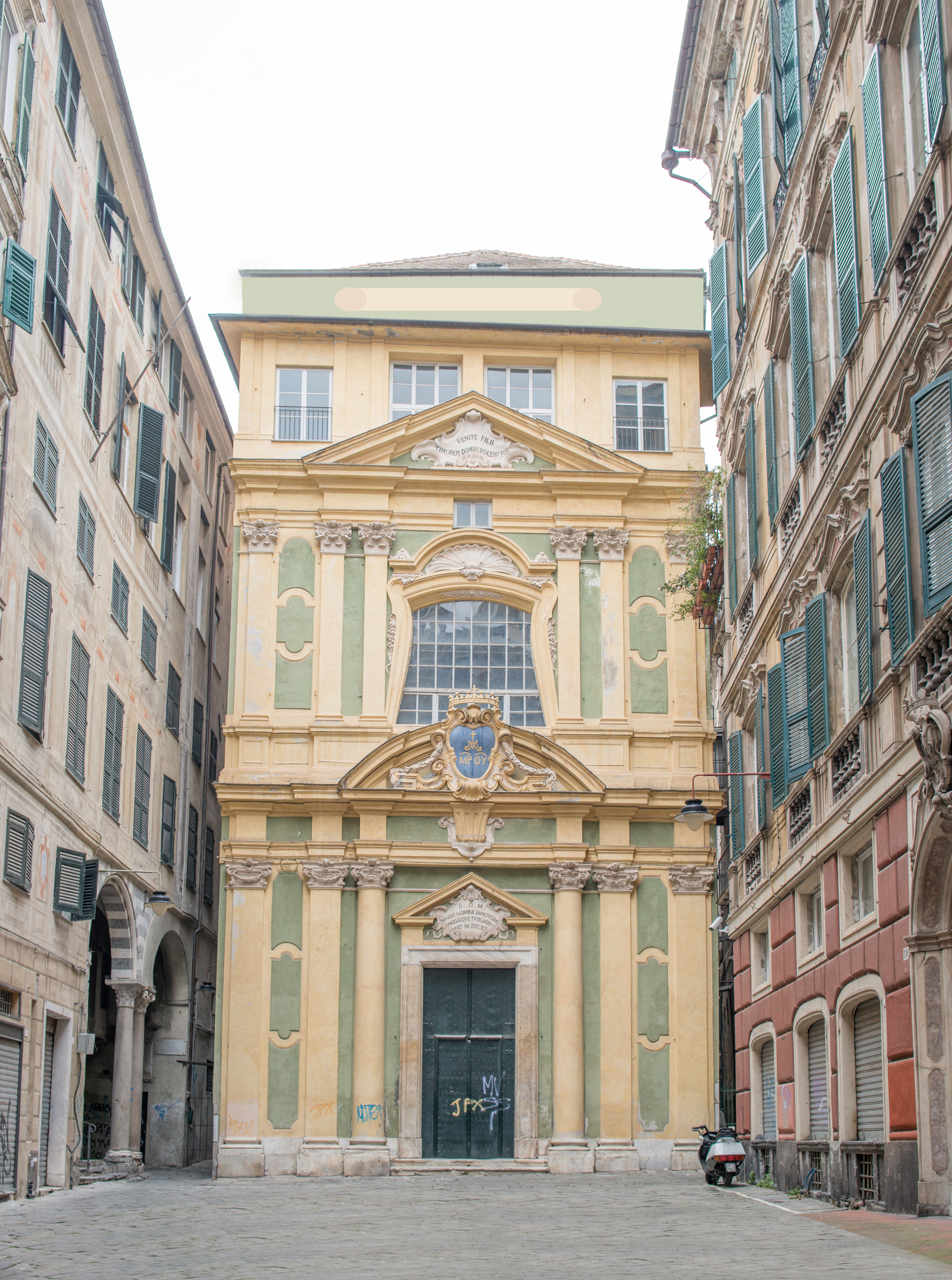
Church of the Scuole Pie

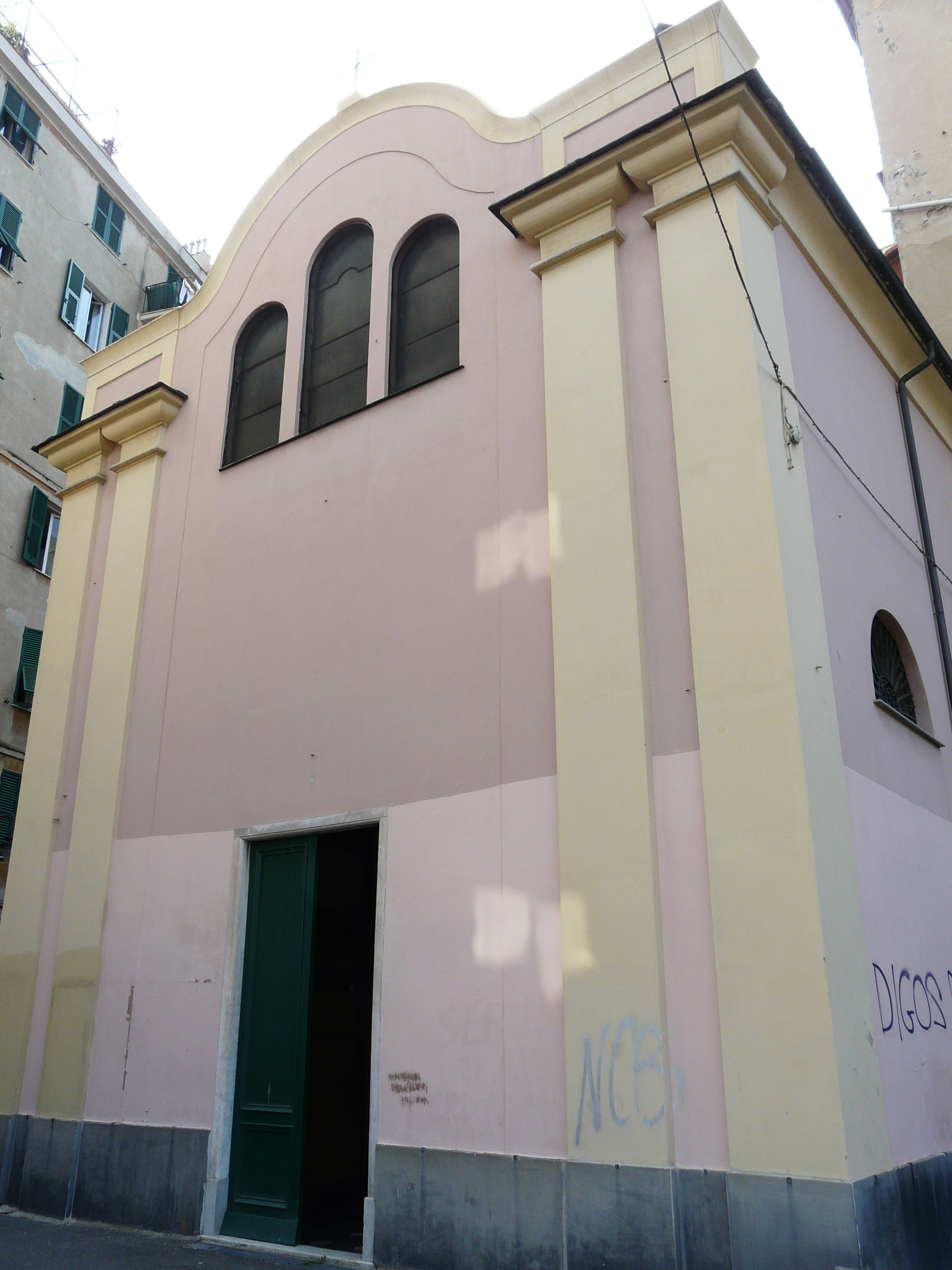
Nostra Signora delle Grazie al Molo

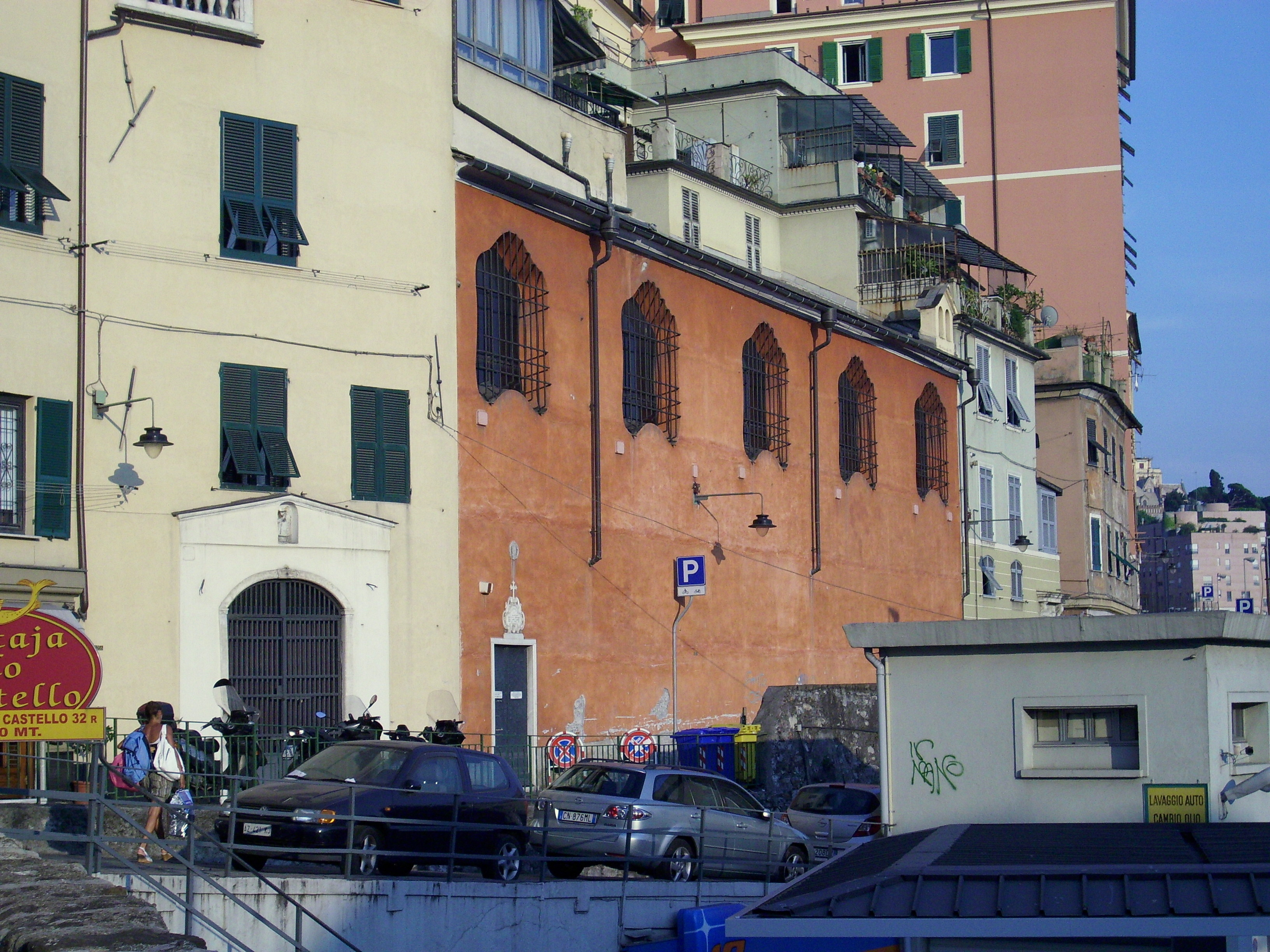
Oratory of S. Giacomo della Marina

=== Deconsecrated churches ===
- Sant'Agostino on the top of the hill of Sarzano, was founded in the 13th century by the Augustinians who remained there till the suppression law of 1798; since then the church was used as a warehouse and even as blacksmith workshop and restored only in 1932. It was severely damaged by the bombings of World War II and again restored in 1986 to become the seat of a museum, where art works (mainly sculptures) from Genoese churches no longer existing are preserved. The church is used as auditorium and sometimes for theatrical representations of the nearby "Teatro della Tosse". The church, in Gothic style, has the typical façade with black and white stripes and a large rose window. Peculiar are the tented roof of the bell tower, covered with polychrome majolica tiles and the triangular cloister of the monastery.
- San Salvatore in Sarzano. The former church of Holy Saviour, on the top of the hill of Sarzano, was built in 1141 and rebuilt in Baroque style in the 17th century. It was severely damaged during World War II and abandoned for a long time. Only in the 1990s it was restored and became the lecture hall of the Architecture Faculty of the University of Genoa; sometimes it is used also for meetings and concerts. In this church the famous Genoese violinist Niccolò Paganini was baptized on 28 October 1782. The square in front of the church (piazza Sarzano) was the only real square in the old town; here the medieval tournaments were held and the processions of the "casacce" (the Genoese confraternities) usually concluded their way.
- Santa Maria in Passione; it is located almost on the top of the hill of Castello, in the place where in the Middle Ages there was the palaces of Embriaco family. The church, built in the 14th century as a part of a monastery of Augustinian nuns, closed in the 19th century, was almost completely destroyed during World War II and never rebuilt. Its ruins, put safe, are deliberately left as they were, as a memorial and warning against war. The bell tower, survived almost intact the bombing, stands over the ruins, but the fine frescoes by Valerio Castello and Domenico Piola depicting the Passion of Jesus, that gave the name to the church, were lost.
- Santa Maria delle Grazie la Nuova is a former church located nearby Santa Maria in Passione and, like this, part of a monastery of Augustinian nuns founded in the 14th century; it was called "la Nuova" (the new) to distinguish it from the nearby church of Nostra Signora delle Grazie al Molo. It was restored in the 17th century and closed due to the suppression law at the beginning of the 19th century. Since 1810 it was used for different and improper purposes. After a long period of abandon, the building was restored in the first 2000s and since 2005 is the seat of the "International Research Centre Casa Paganini"; the church is used as a concert hall.
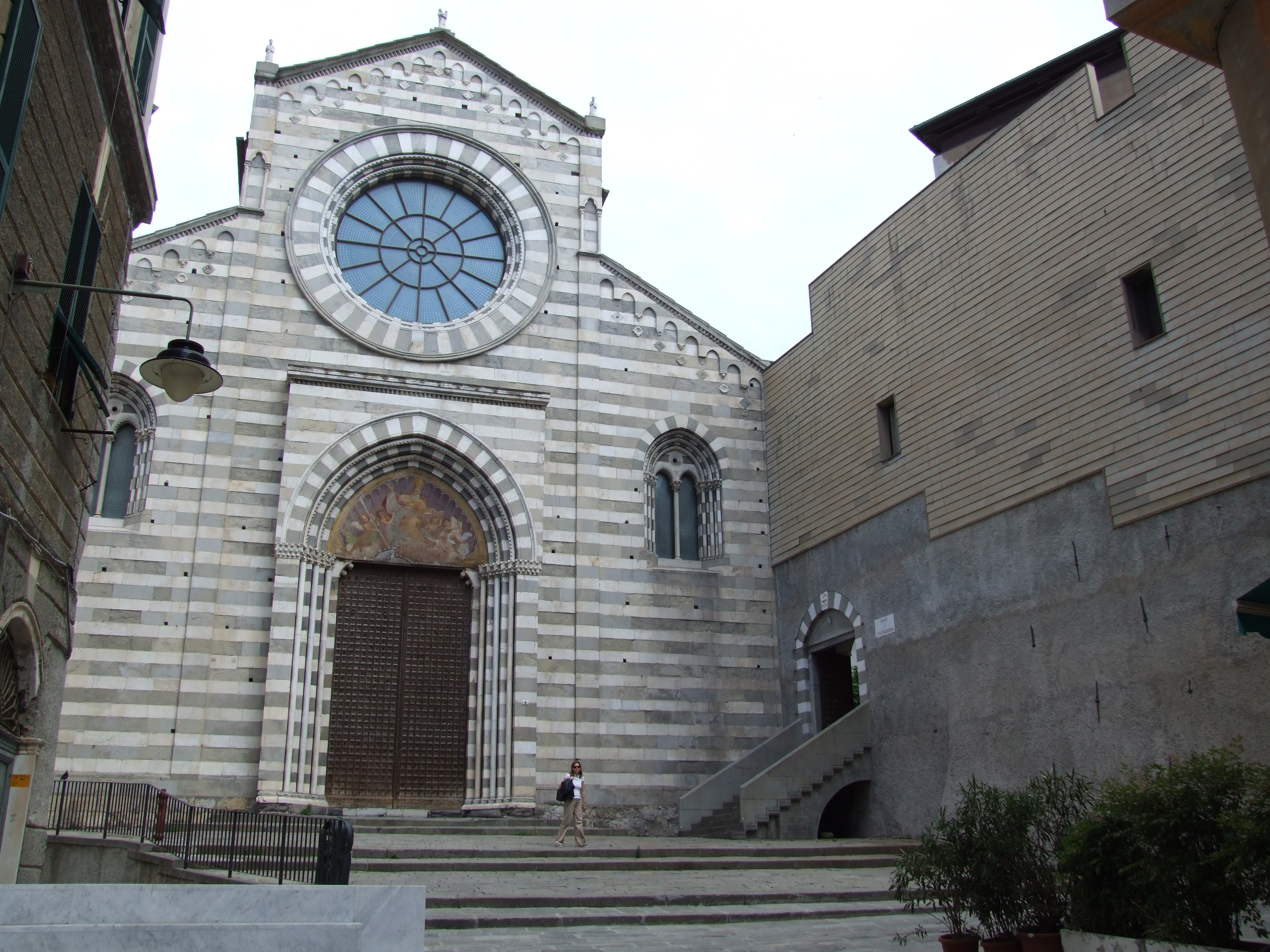
Sant'Agostino

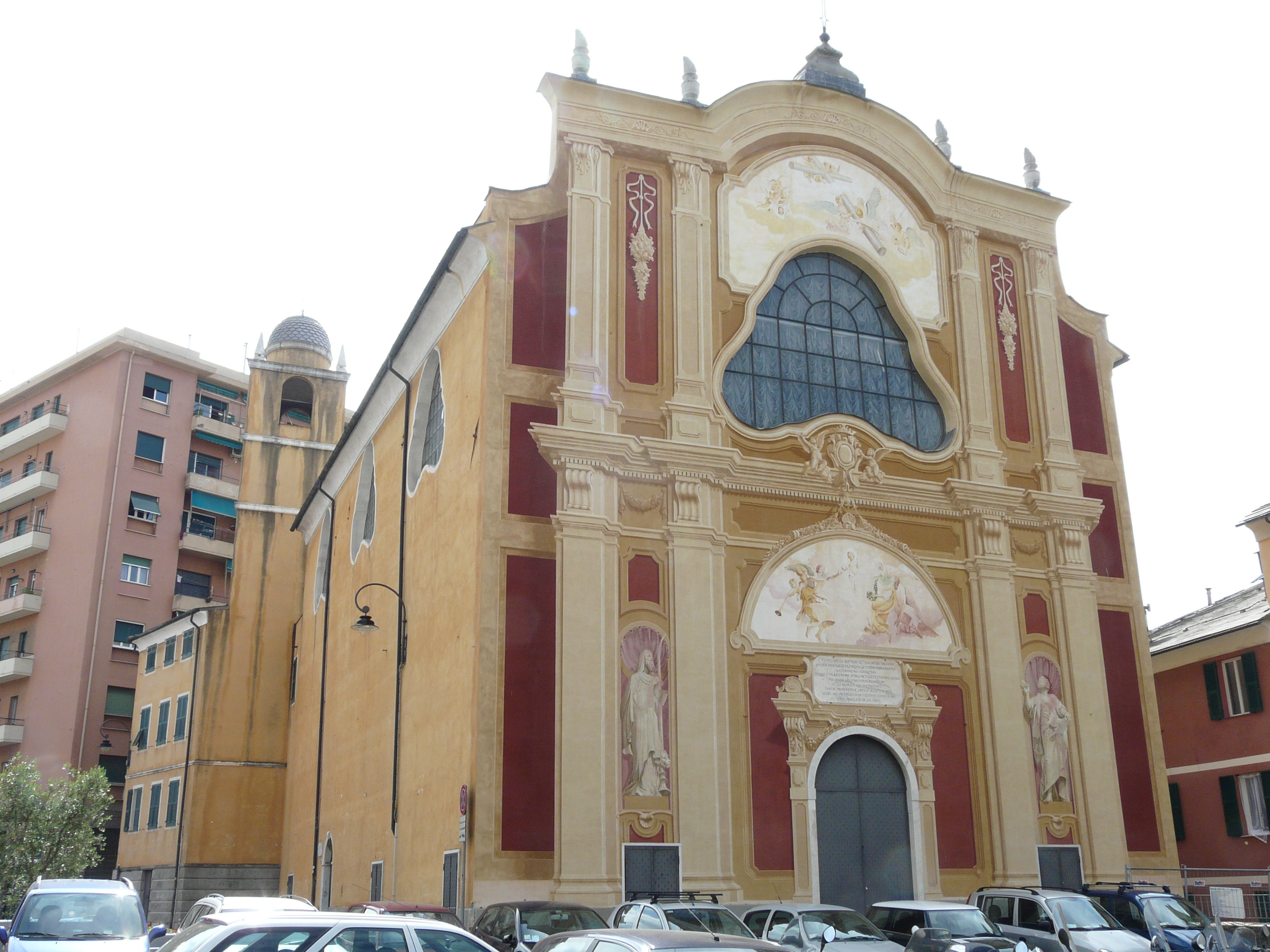
San Salvatore

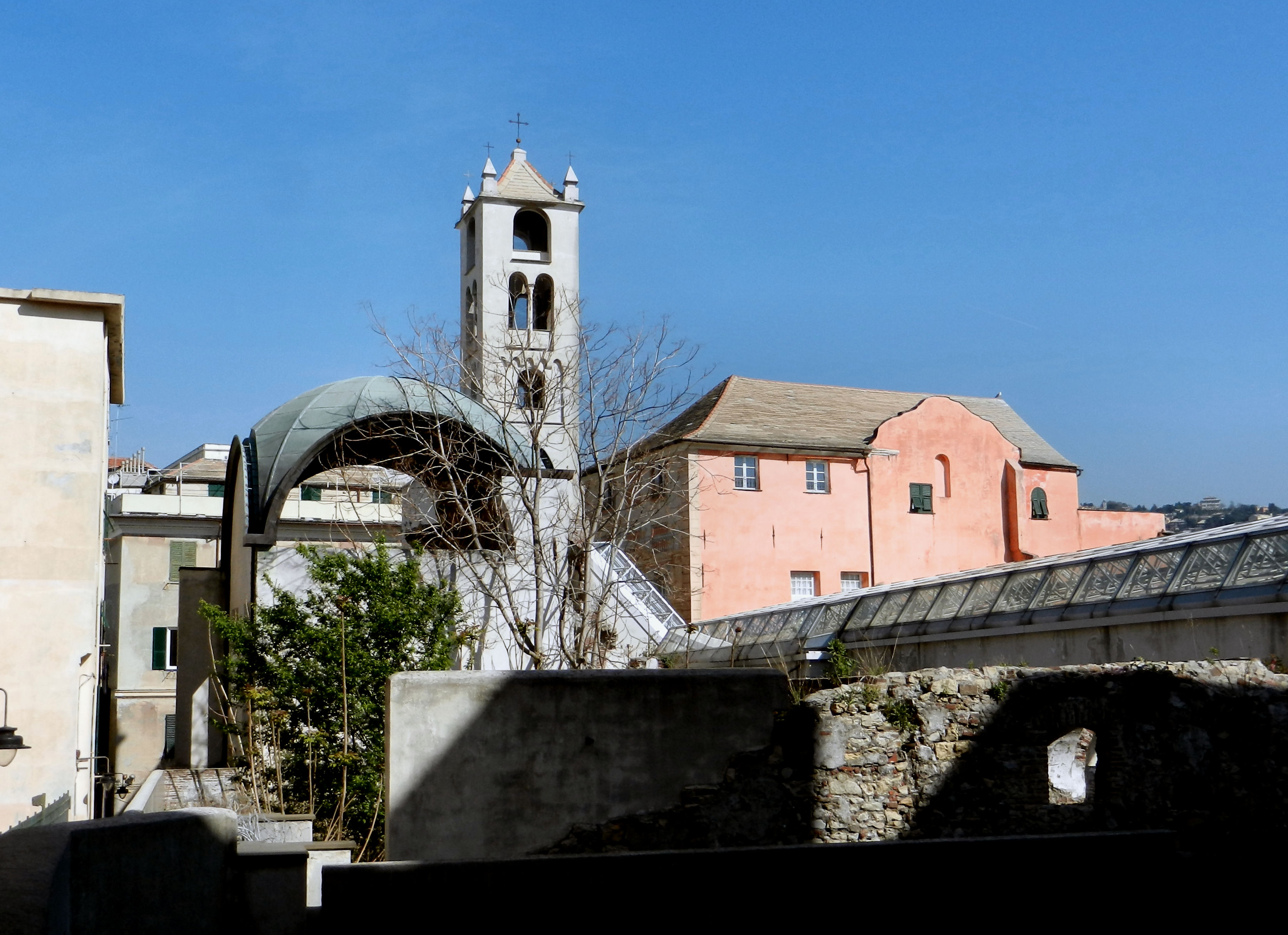
The ruins of Santa Maria in Passione and the former monastery of S. Maria delle Grazie "la Nuova" (the pink building on the left)

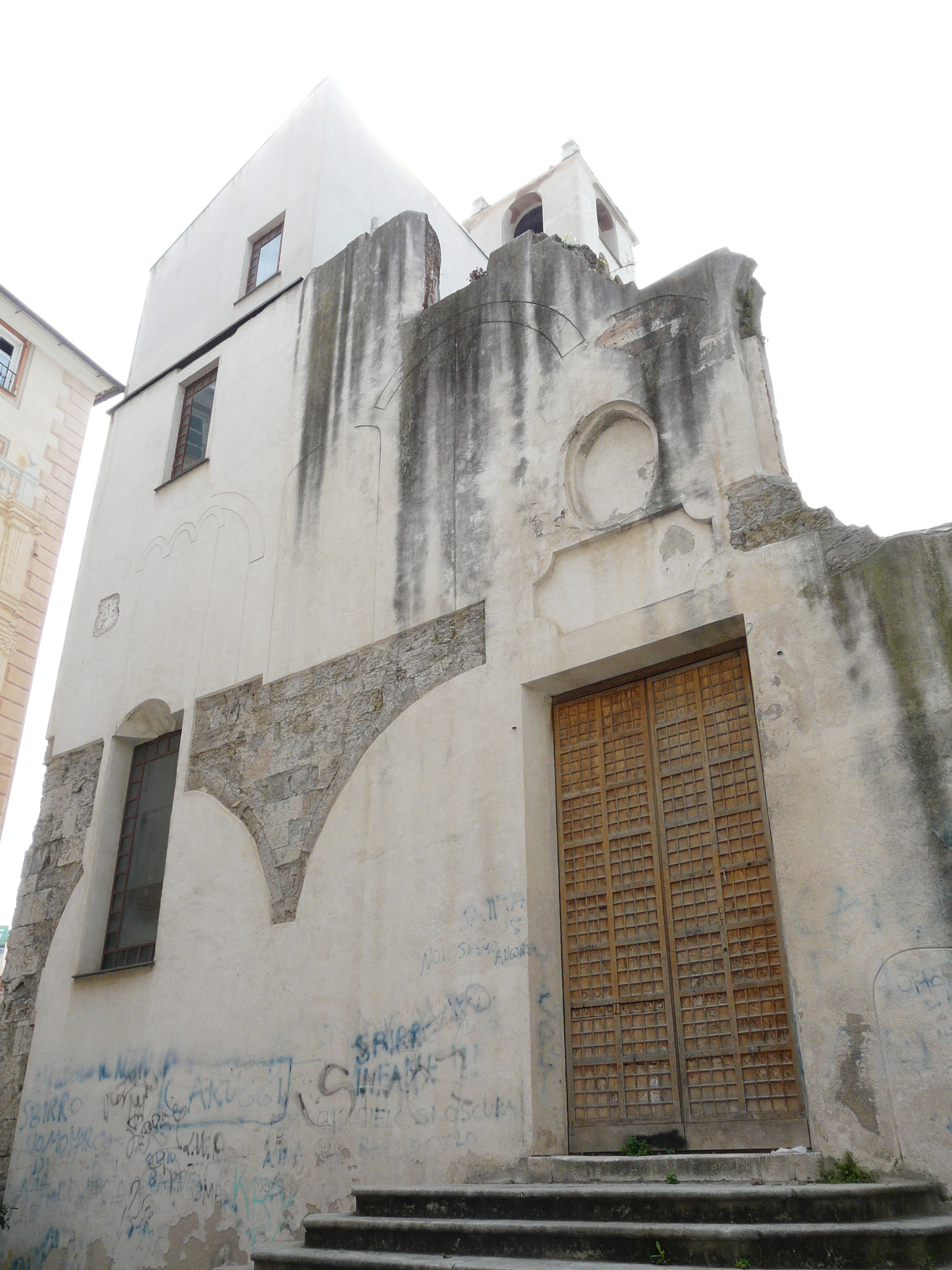
The façade of the church of S. Maria in Passione

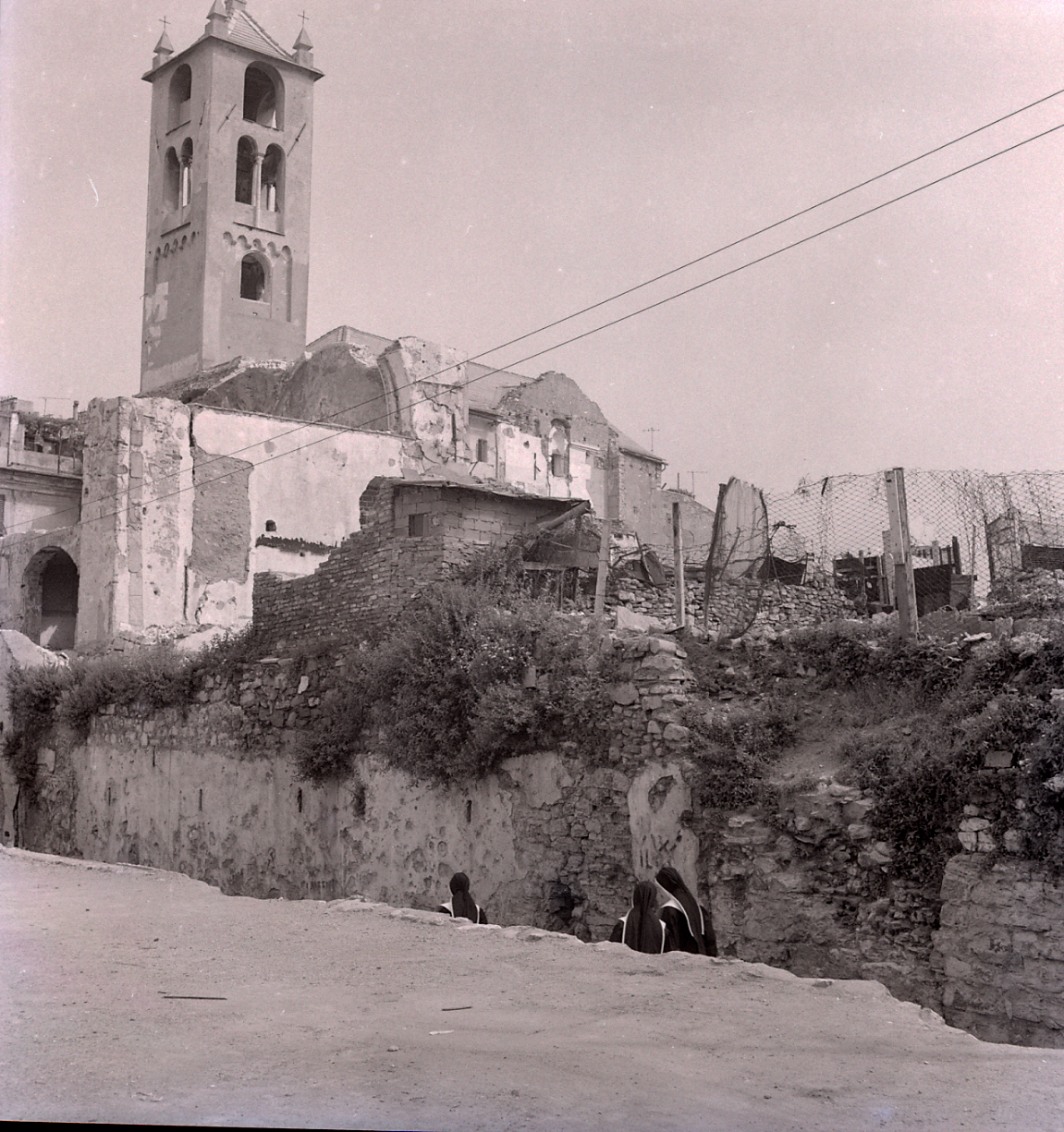
The ruins of the church of S. Maria in Passione after the bombing, by Paolo Monti

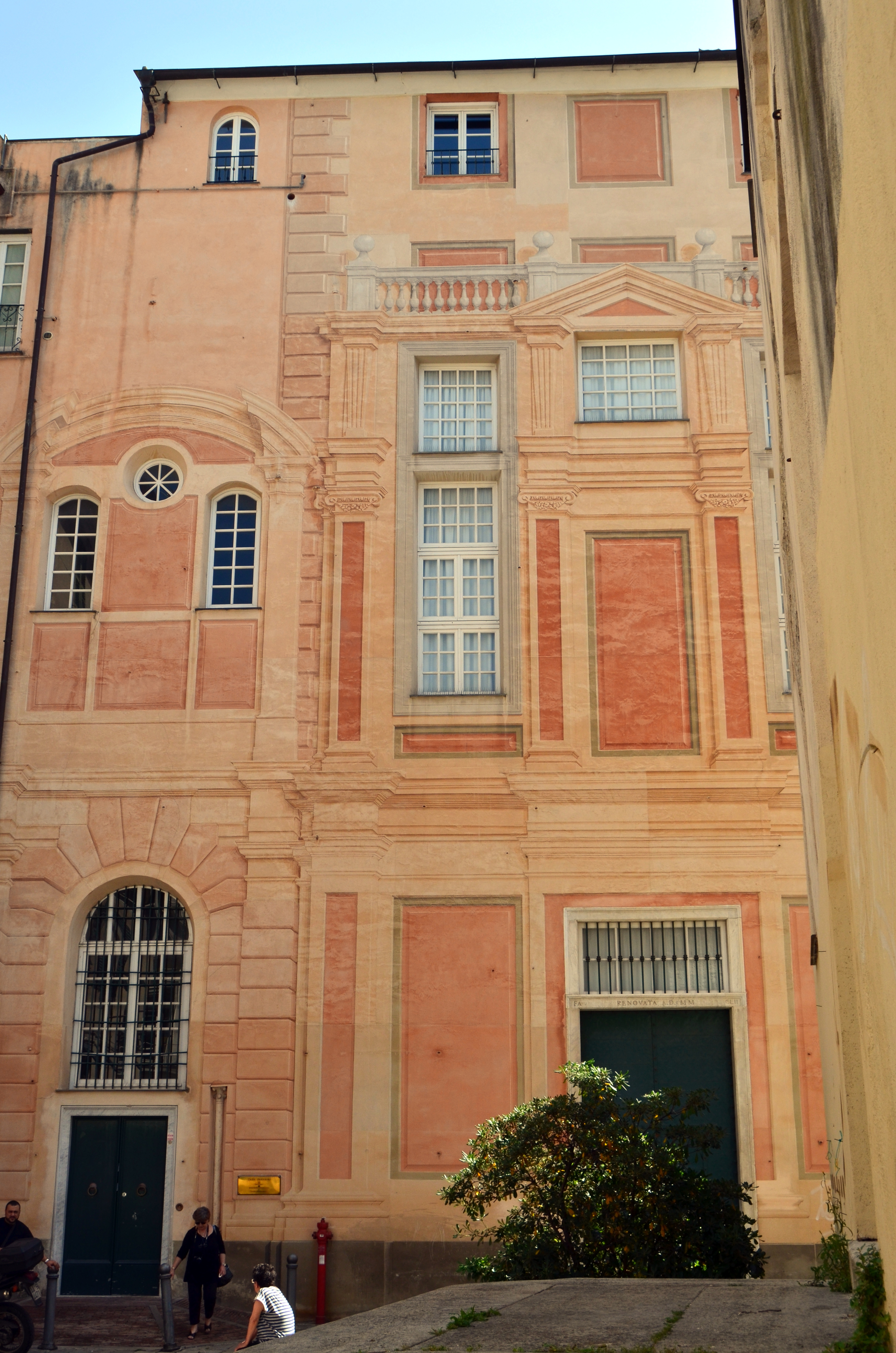
The façade of the former church of S. Maria delle Grazie la Nuova

== Notable people ==
- Guglielmo Embriaco (11th century), one of the military leaders of the First Crusade and one of the founders of the Commune of Genoa, is the best known member of the Embriaco family.
- Goffredo Mameli (1827–1849), patriot, notable figure of the Risorgimento, author of the lyrics of Il Canto degli Italiani, the present national anthem, was born and lived in Molo.
- Jacopo Ruffini (1805–1833), patriot, follower of Mazzini, was born and lived in Molo and died as a suicide in the prison of Grimaldina tower.
- Alfred Noack (1833–1895), German photographer, known for his views of Genoa, Florence and Ligurian Riviera, lived in Genoa where he had his workshop in vico del Filo, near the cathedral.
- Battistina Vernazza (1497–1587), Augustinian nun, author of spiritual canticles and religious texts, spent most of her life in the monastery of Santa Maria delle Grazie la Nuova, where was twice the prioress

Besides the Embriacos, many family who gave over the centuries an important contribution to the history of the Republic of Genoa had in Molo their palaces and business, among them Doria, Cattaneo-Dalla Volta, De Marini, Giustiniani, Salvago, Sauli and Fieschi.

== Bibliography ==
- Guida d'Italia – Liguria. TCI, Milan. 2009.
- Caraceni Poleggi, Fiorella (1984). Genova – Guida Sagep. SAGEP and Automobile Club of Genoa.
- Casalis, Goffredo (1841). Dizionario geografico, storico, statistico e commerciale degli stati di S.M. il Re di Sardegna. G. Maspero, Turin.
