= Lordship of Gibeletto =

Crusader territory in present-day Lebanon

- Genoese lordship within the County of Tripoli
- 1109–1302
- Flag
- Capital: Gibeletto
- Government
  - Type: Lordship
- Lord
  - 1109–c.1118 (first): Guglielmo Embriaco
  - 1282–1302 (last): Pietro Embriaco
- Historical era: Middle Ages
  - Capture of the region by the Crusades: 1109
  - Conquest by the Mamluk Sultanate: 1302
Preceded by	Succeeded by
Fatimid Caliphate	Mamluk Sultanate
- Today part of: Lebanon

The Lordship of Gibelletto (also known as Gibello, Gibelet, or Jebail) was a Genoese fief within the County of Tripoli, one of the Crusader states in the Holy Land. Its territory was coastal, in the southern part of the County of Tripoli, bordering to the south the Lordship of Beirut in the Kingdom of Jerusalem.

Throughout its history it was under the rule of the Genoese Embriaco family, first as administrators of the city in the name of the Republic of Genoa, and then as a hereditary fief, undertaking to pay an annual fee to Genoa and the church of San Lorenzo (Genoa's Cathedral).

== History ==
Following the creation of the County of Tripoli, in 1109, the Genoese Republic received a quarter of the county in gratitude for their help in its conquest and established one of their trading colonies there.

Gibelletto, or Gibelet, known in antiquity as Byblos and today as Jubayl, was conquered by the Crusades in 1104 and was granted by Bertrand, the first count of Tripoli, to the Genoese admiral Guglielmo Embriaco. The ancient city, with its port, became the seat and capital of the lordship governed by the Embriaco family, who retained it until 1302, except for the years following 1187 when it was occupied by Saladin, the sultan of the Ayyubid dynasty.

Following the fall of Tripoli in 1289, the Lordship became a vassal of the Mamluk Sultanate. In 1302, the city was abandoned, apparently in a peaceful manner.

== Lords of Gibeletto ==
- 1109 – c.1118: Guglielmo I Embriaco
- c. 1127 – 1135: Ugo I Embriaco
- 1135 – 1157: Guglielmo II Embriaco
- 1157 – 1184: Ugo II Embriaco
- 1184 – 1187: Ugo III Embriaco

1187 – 1197: occupied by Saladin

- 1197 – 1241: Guido I Embriaco
- 1241 – 1271: Enrico I Embriaco
- 1271 – 1282: Guido II Embriaco
- 1282 – 1302: Pietro Embriaco
