= Bartholomew Embriaco =

Bartholomew Embriaco (d. 1289) was a nobleman of Genoese origin and a prominent member of the Embriaco family, lords of Gibelet in the County of Tripoli during the Crusader period.

== Biography ==
Bartholomew was the son of Bertrand Embriaco and Béatrix de Saint-Siméon, and a grandson of Hugh Embriaco. He was closely involved in the ongoing conflict between the Embriaco family and the Princes of Antioch, which intensified during the War of Saint Sabas (1256–1270), a conflict between Genoese and Venetian factions that escalated into a wider civil war among the nobility of the Crusader states.

Following the assassination of his father, Bertrand Embriaco, by serfs acting on the orders of Bohemond VI in 1258, Bartholomew continued the family's resistance against the authority of the Princes of Antioch. In 1277, he appeared at a comital ceremony in Tripoli, signaling temporary peace with Bohemond VII, but conflict resumed after Bohemond broke a marriage promise to the Embriacos. Bartholomew's leadership reflected ongoing efforts to preserve family autonomy, yet the struggle ultimately ended in defeat. In 1282, his brother William and several cousins were executed at Nephin by order of Bohemond VII.

According to Ibn Taghribirdi, Bartholomew had conspired with Sultan Qalawun during the latter's capture of Maraclea in 1285, promising to share control of Tripoli with the sultan in exchange for his support in overthrowing the comital family. Following the death of Bohemond VII In 1287, he led a revolt against the rule of Bartholomew Mansel in Tripoli, resulting in the establishment of a commune in the city, where he assumed the role of mayor. However, Bartholomew himself was killed during the Fall of Tripoli in 1289, when the city was captured by the Mamluks.

== Marriage and issue ==
Bartholomew married Helvise of Scandalion, with whom he had the following children:

- Bertrand (†1289), who served as regent of Tripoli and married a lady of Gibelet.
- Hugh, who married Catherine de La Roche.
- Agnes, who married Gauvain de La Roche, and later Peter Embriaco, Lord of Gibelet.

== Bibliography ==
- Decker, Sarah Ifft (2016). Laura L. Gathagan; William North (eds.). The Haskins Society Journal 27: Studies in Medieval History. Boydell & Brewer. ISBN 9781783271481.
- Runciman, Steven (1987). A History of the Crusades Volume 3. Cambridge University Press.
- Setton, Kenneth (1985). A History of the Crusades: The Impact of the Crusades on the Near East. University of Wisconsin Press.
