= Santa Maria di Castello =

Church building in Genoa, Italy

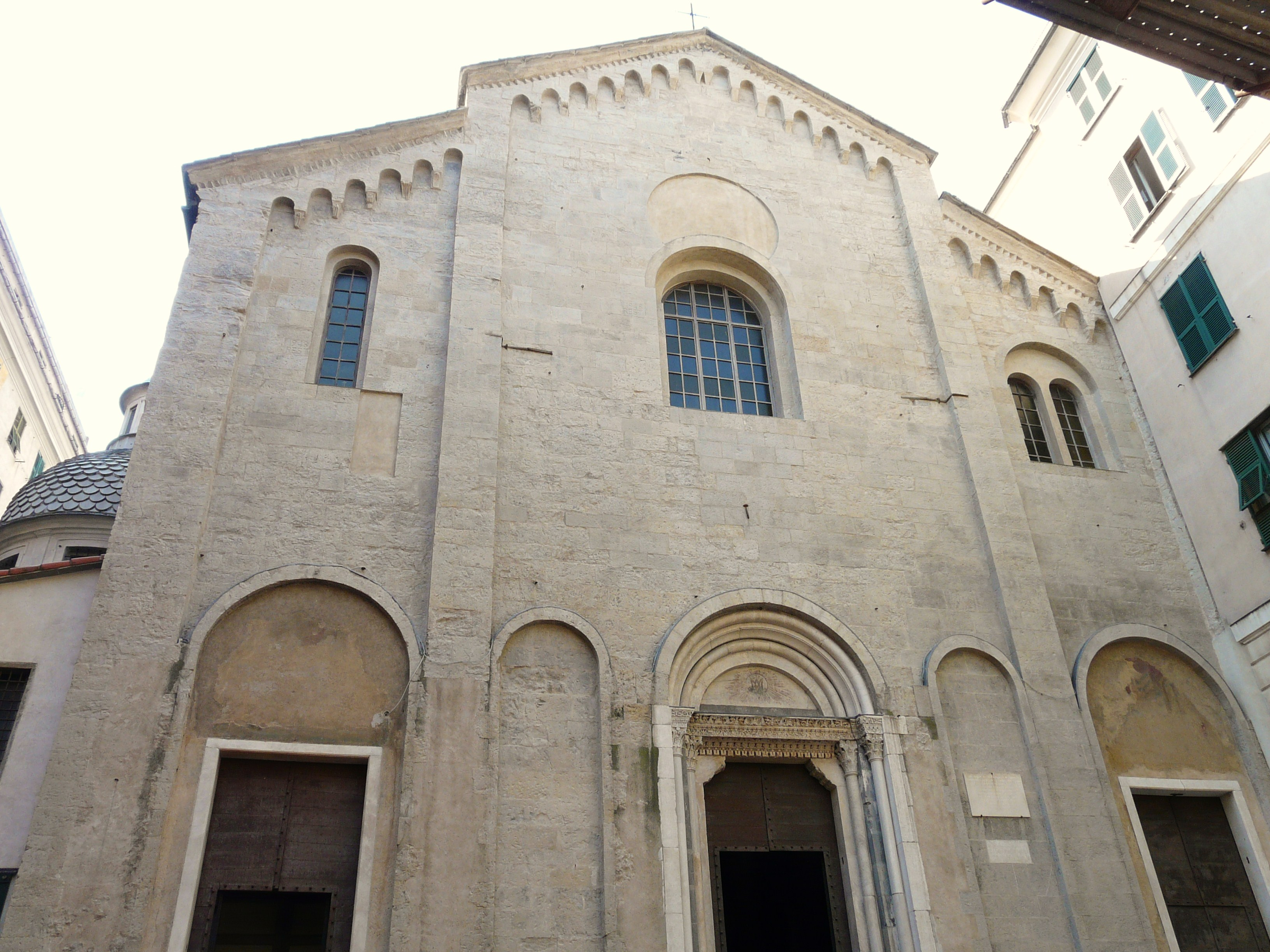
- the façade of the church

Religion
- Affiliation: Roman Catholic
- Province: Genoa
- Ecclesiastical or organisational status: National monument
- Year consecrated: c. 900
- Status: Active

Location
- Location: Genoa, Italy
- Interactive map of Santa Maria di Castello
- Coordinates: 44°24′20.76″N 8°55′44.39″E

Architecture
- Type: Church
- Style: Romanesque
- Completed: c 900

Santa Maria di Castello is a church and religious complex in Genoa, Italy. Administrated for a long time by the Dominicans, it is located in the Castello hill of the city, where in the Middle Ages a bishop's fortified castle existed. The church is flanked by the large Tower of the Embriaci.

The church, in Romanesque style, was erected before 900 AD. It houses many artworks commissioned by the main noble families of Genoa, by artists such as Francesco Maria Schiaffino, Lorenzo Fasolo, Alessandro Gherardini, Giuseppe Palmieri, Francesco Boccaccino, Pier Francesco Sacchi, Bernardo Castello, Aurelio Lomi and Tommaso Orsolino. Notable are the frescoes with Stories of David and the painted majolicas from the 16th century Genoese school (locally known as laggioin [laˈʤwiŋ], or laggioni in their Italian translation).

The high altar is decorated by a marble group of the "Assumption" by Domenico Parodi (late 17th century), while the chapel to the left of the presbytery has a Santa Rosa da Lima by Domenico Piola and a marble cover by Taddeo Carlone. The fourth chapel in the left aisle has a Madonna del Rosario by the workshop of Anton Maria Maragliano, while the first chapel has a painting attributed to Giovanni Battista Paggi (early 17th century).

The baptistery has a polyptych from Lombard masters of the 15th century. The main portal is in Tuscan style (mid-15th century), and is surmounted by a Gothic lunette of the 14th century with a "Crucifixion".

The loggia facing the second cloister has frescoes of Saints, a Madonna and, on the first floor, an Annunciation by Giusto d'Alemagna (1451). In the upper floor has a statue of "St. Catherina of Alexandria" and a marble tabernacle attributed to Domenico Gagini (15th century).

== See also ==
- Embriaci Tower
- Embriaco family
