= Alemagna =

Alemagna is an Italian surname. Notable people with the surname include:

- Beatrice Alemagna (born 1973), Italian illustrator and author
- Gioacchino Alemagna (1892 -1974), Italian pastry chef and entrepreneur, founder of the Alemagna food company
- Giusto di Alemagna (15th century), a German painter active in Genoa

== See also ==
- Alemania
