= Hugh l'Aleman (died before 1241) =

Hugo or Hugh l’Aleman (died before 26 March 1241) was a nobleman of the Kingdom of Jerusalem.

== Life ==
He was the second son of the German crusader Garnier l’Aleman and his wife Pavia Embriaco of Gibelet. His elder brother John Aleman became Lord of Caesarea by marriage.

Hugh married Isabella (died after 1260), daughter of Daniel I of Adelon, with whom he had a daughter, who married John of Gibelet (died 1282), son of Henry I Embriaco. Isabella is described as a widow in a charter dated 26 March 1241, proving Hugh had died by this point
