= Byblos Castle =

Castle in Byblos, Lebanon

Coordinates: 34.12°N 35.6464°E

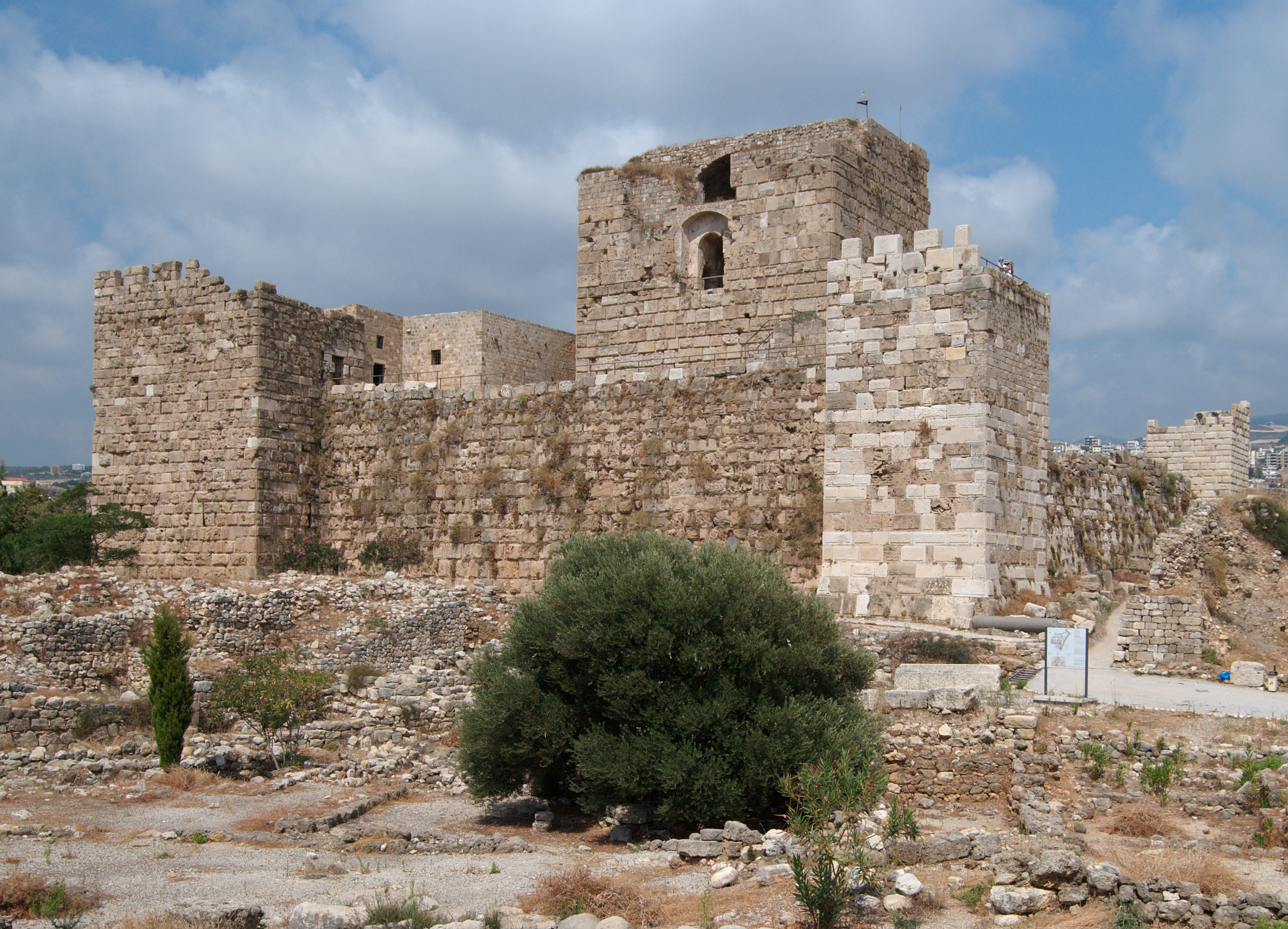
Byblos Castle

Byblos Castle (Arabic: قلعة جبيل) is a Crusader castle in Byblos, Lebanon. In Crusader times it was known as the Castle of Gibelet /ˈdʒɪbəlɪt, ˈdʒɪblɪt/, also spelled Giblet, which belonged to the Genoese Republic Embriaco family, Lords of the city. It is adjacent to the Phoenician archaeological site containing the ruins of the Temple of Baalat Gebal and the Temple of the Obelisks.

== History ==
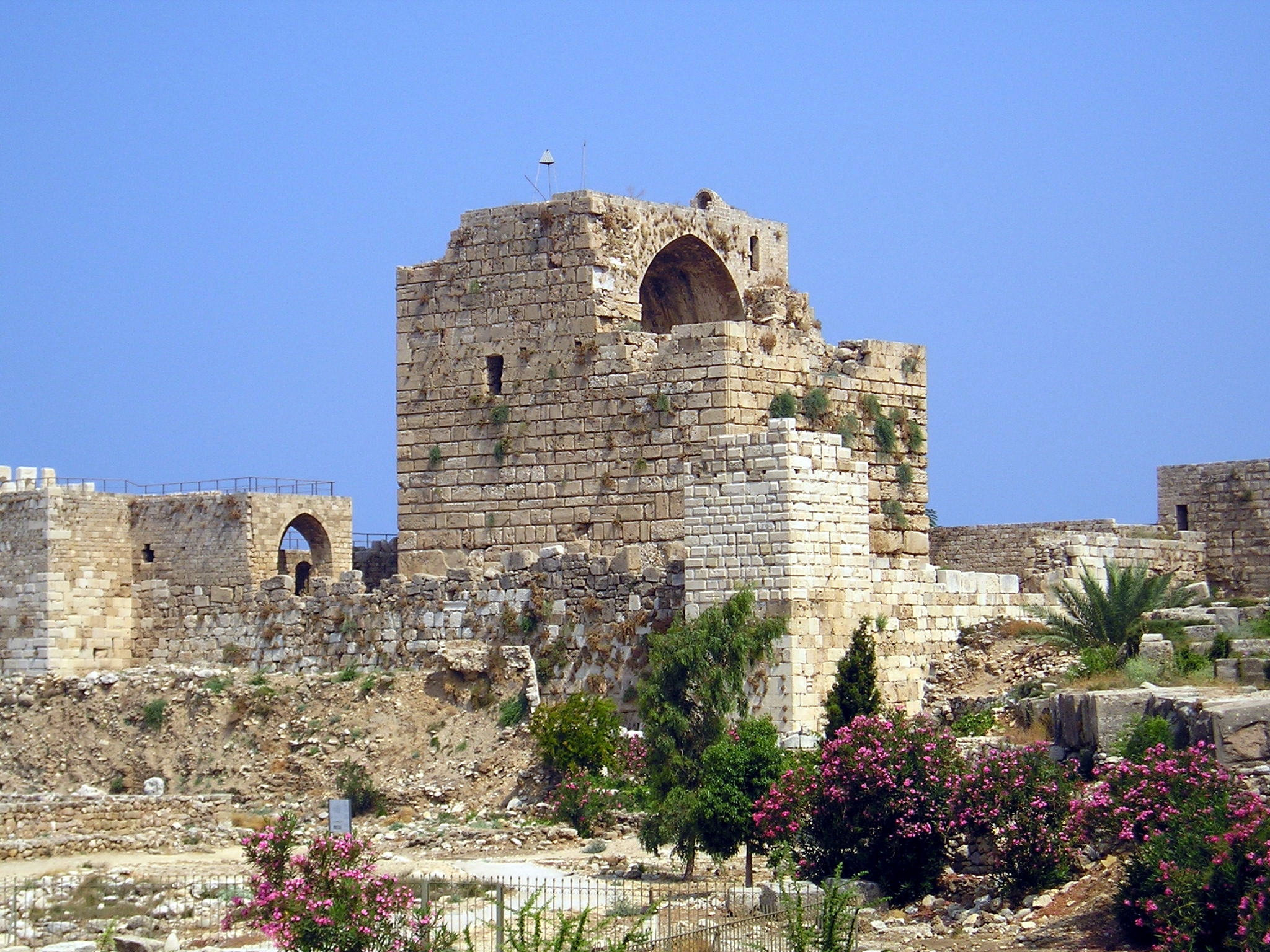
Byblos Castle

The castle was built by the Crusaders in the 12th century from indigenous limestone and the remains of Roman structures. The finished structure was surrounded by a moat. It belonged to the Genoese Embriaco family, whose members were the Lords of Gibelet from 1100 to the late 13th century. Saladin captured the town and castle in 1188 and partially dismantled the walls in 1190. Later, the Crusaders recaptured Byblos and rebuilt the fortifications of the castle in 1197. In 1369, the castle had to fend off an attack from Cypriot vessels from Famagusta.

The Byblos Castle has distinguished historical buildings for neighbors. Nearby stand a few Egyptian temples, the Phoenician royal necropolis and the Roman amphitheatre.

== Description ==
The Crusader castle of Gibelet is "the finest example" (Boas) of a new 12th-century type, which mixes the castrum-type with the turris-type castle: a roughly square set of walls strengthened by corner towers, built around a central donjon, thus forming two layers of defense.

== Byblos Site Museum ==
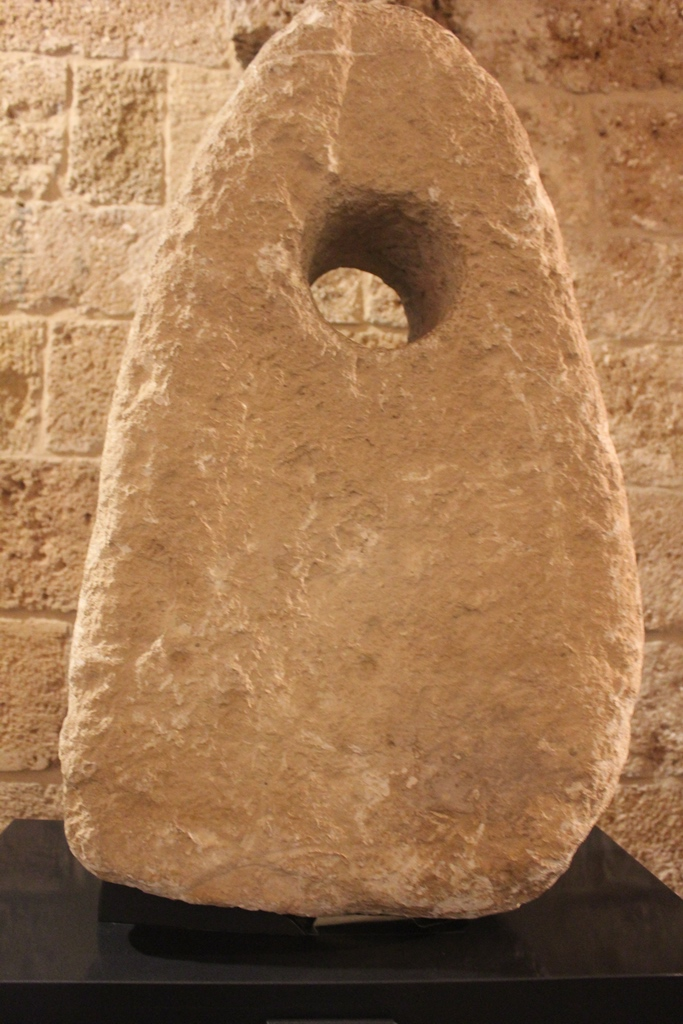
Limestone anchor (1800 BCE)

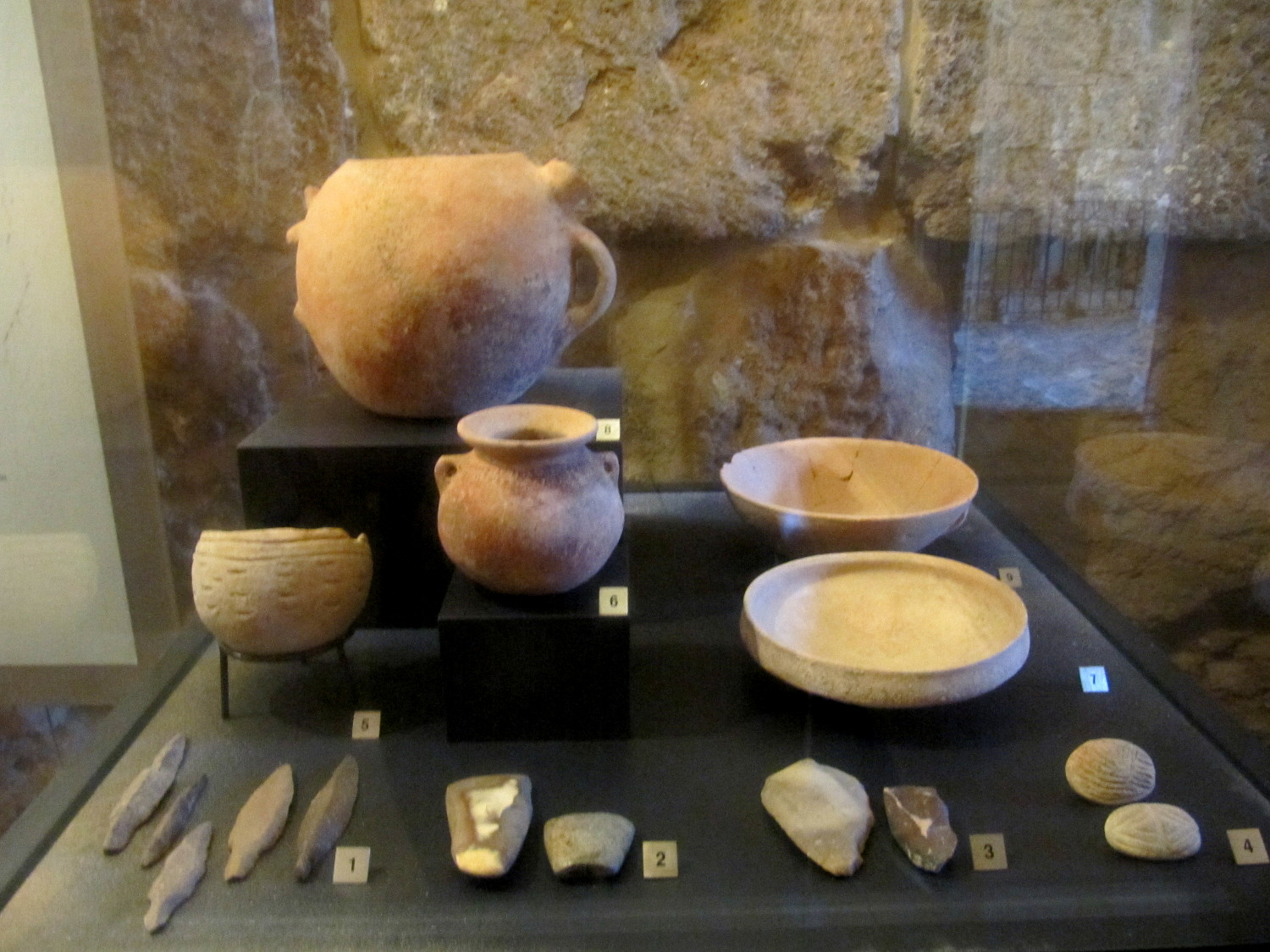
Exhibits at the museum inside the Byblos Castle

The castle houses the Byblos site museum. It displays remains of the excavations undertaken on the site of the archeological preserve of Byblos, although the most important finds are displayed in the National Museum of Beirut. Moreover, the history of Byblos from prehistory to the medieval periods, is illustrated with thematic panels.

== See also ==
- List of Crusader castles
- Temple of Baalat Gebal
