= Embriaco family =

Coordinates: 34.1200°N 35.6464°E

Embriaco
- Parent family: Spinola
- Country: Lordship of Gibeletto, Crusader states
- Etymology: Guglielmo Spinola (later called Guglielmo Embriaco)
- Origin: Republic of Genoa
- Founded: XI century
- Founder: Guglielmo Embriaco
- Titles: Lord of Gibeletto
- Heirlooms: Sacro Catino
- Estates: Embriaci Tower; Byblos Castle
- Dissolution: XV century

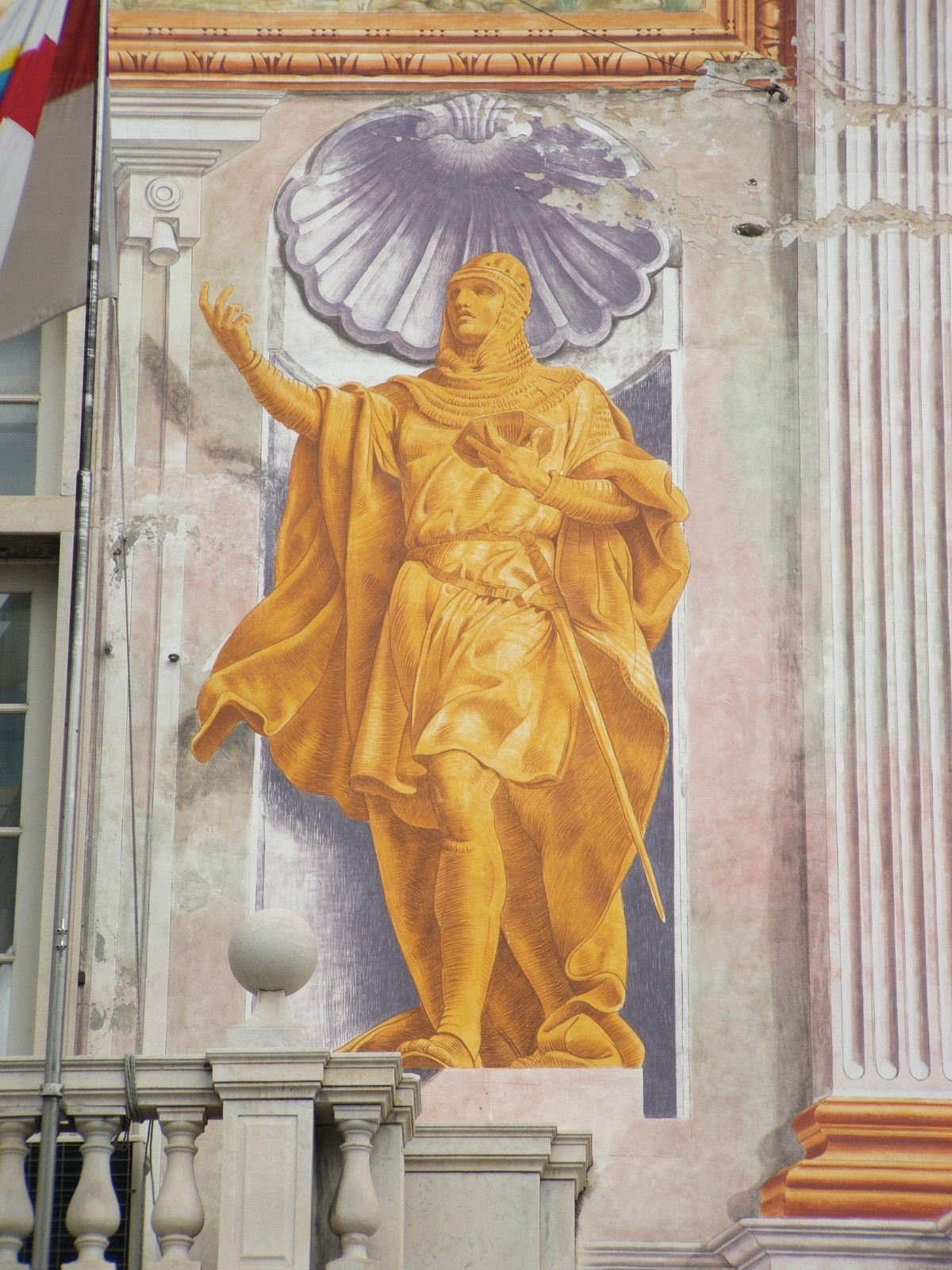
Guglielmo Embriaco portrayed on the main façade of the Palazzo San Giorgio, Genoa

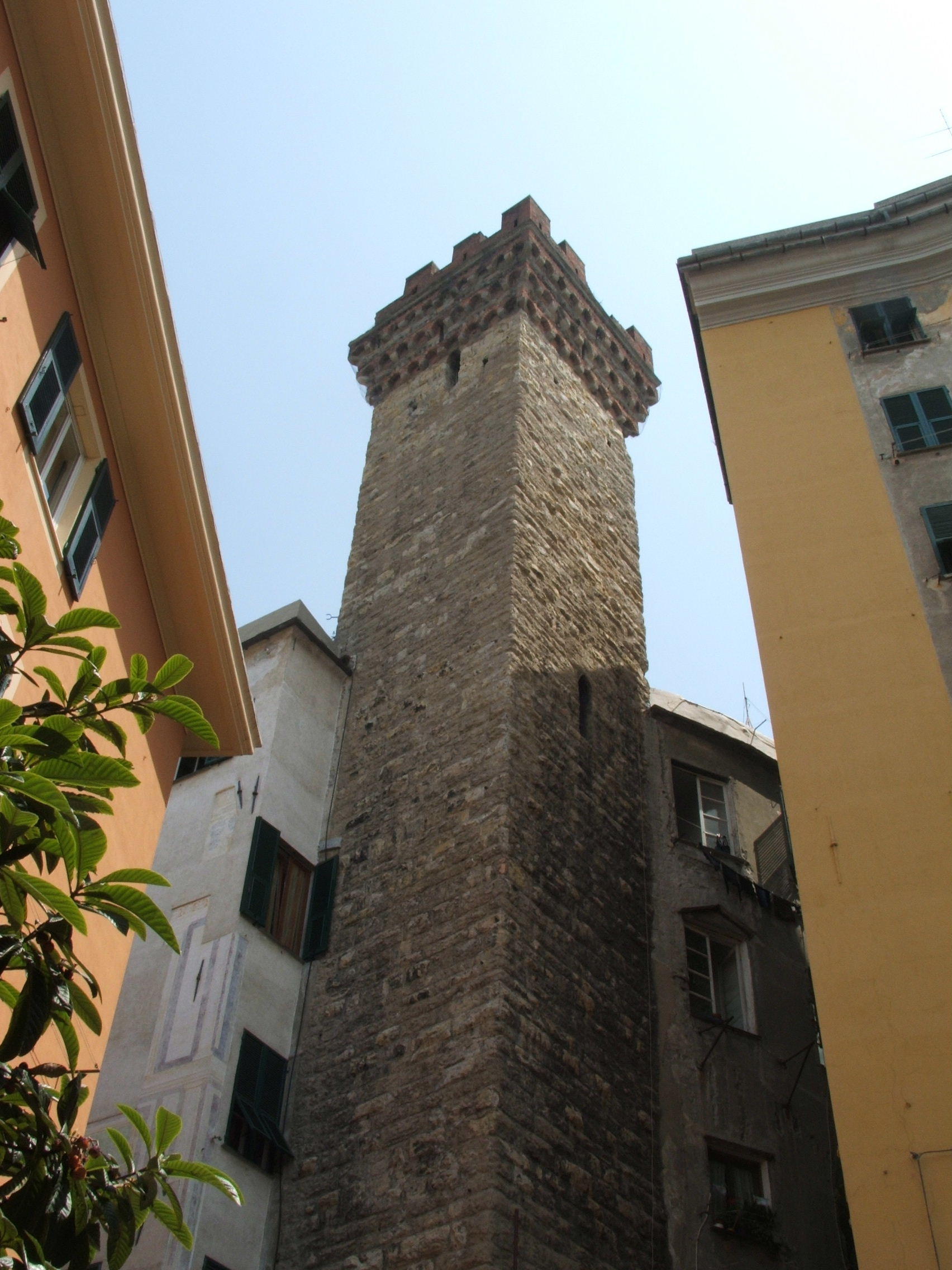
The Embriaci Tower in Genoa

The Embriaco family were a prominent Genoese family, who played an important role in the history of the Crusader states. It also gave consuls, admirals and ambassadors to the Republic of Genoa.

The family ruled the city of Byblos (in present-day Lebanon), styling themselves "Lord (Signore) of Gib(e)let" or "Gibelletto", the name which the city was called at the time. Their rule lasted for almost 200 years, from 1100 to the late 13th century.

== History ==
They arrived in the Kingdom of Jerusalem as early as 1099, with Guglielmo Embriaco and his brother Primo di Castello. They had Byblos, given to Ugo I Embriaco by Bertrand of Toulouse, from about 1110, thanks to Embriaco's military assistance in the creation of the Crusader states, on behalf of the Republic of Genoa.

Guglielmo Embriaco's son, Ugo I, was the first administrator of "Gibelletto" in the name of the Genoese republic, he then obtained the city as a hereditary fief, undertaking to pay an annual fee to Genoa and to the church of San Lorenzo.

The family always protected the Genoese traders in the Levant, exempting them from all duties. Their power in Byblos lasted, apart from occupation by Saladin 1187–1197, to the end to the thirteenth century, when they were defeated by Bohemond VII of Tripoli, and finally pushed out by Muslim advances.

The Embriacos were Lords of lands in Liguria and in Lunigiana. And had properties and a square in Genoa. The male line of the family died out in the middle of the 15th century.

== Embriaco family tree ==
- Guglielmo I Embriaco of Gibelletto, Lord of Gibelletto (b. 1040) (r. 1109 – after 1118)
  - Ugo I Embriaco of Gibelletto, Lord of Gibelletto (c. 1110 – ?) (r. before 1127 – 1135), married Adelasia
    - Guglielmo II Embriaco of Gibelletto (de), Lord of Gibelletto (r. 1135−1157), married Sancha from Provence
      - Ugo II Embriaco of Gibelletto (de), Lord of Gibelletto (r. 1157−1184) (d. 1184)
        - Ugo III Embriaco, Lord of Gibelletto (r. 1184−1187) (d. 1196), married Stephanie of Milly, and had:
          - Guido I Embriaco, Lord of Gibelletto (1197–1241) (d. 1241), married Alice, daughter of Bohemond III of Antioch, in 1204 and had:
            - Maria (born before October 1214)
            - Enrico I Embriaco of Gibelletto, Lord of Gibelletto (r. 1241−1271) (d. c. 1271), married c. 1250 Isabelle d'Ibelin, and had:
              - Baliano Embriaco of Gibelletto (d. 26 August 1313, Nicosia)
              - Guido II Embriaco of Gibelletto, Lord of Gibelletto (r. 1271−1282) (d. 1282 in Nephin) married Margaret Grenier of Sidon, daughter of Julian Grenier, Lord of Sidon
                - Maria Embriaco of Gibelletto (es) (d. Nicosia 1331/4, buried there), married c. 1295 Philip of Ibelin, Seneschal of Cyprus and Jerusalem (1253–1318)
                  - Juan de Ibelin (1302 – after 1317)
                  - Guy of Ibelin, married Margaret of Ibelin, with whom he had:
                    - John of Ibelin (d. after 1367)
                    - Alice of Ibelin (d. after 1374), married John of Lusignan, with whom she had: James of Lusignan (died 1395/1397), Peter of Lusignan (died February 10, 1451, who had an illegitimate son Phoebus of Lusignan), Eleanor of Lusignan (died c. 1414), married c. 1406 her cousin Henry of Lusignan and Loysia of Lusignan married her cousin Eudes/Odo of Lusignan
                    - Margaret of Ibelin
                  - Balinese of Ibelin (died 1349), married a woman also named Margaret of Ibelin
                  - Isabel de Ibelin (1300 – after 1342), married Ferdinand of Majorca
                  - Helvis de Ibelin (1307 – after 1347), married Henry II, Duke of Brunswick-Grubenhagen, with whom she had: Philip (c. 1332 – 4 August 1369/70), Riddag (c. 1334 – 1364/67), Balthazar (c. 1336 – aft. 14 January 1384), Thomas (c. 1338 – c. 1384), Melchior (c. 1341 – 6 June 1381) and Helvis, married Louis de Nores
                - Catherine Embriaco of Gibelletto, married Jean of Antioch
                - Peter Embriaco of Giblet (r. 1282−1289) (d. after 1310), the last Lord of Gibelletto married Douce de Gaurelée, then Agnes Embriaco of Gibelletto
                - Silvestre Embriaco of Gibelletto
              - Giovanni Embriaco of Gibelletto (d. January 1282 in Nephin), married daughter of Hugh l'Aleman
              - Baldovino Embriaco of Gibelletto (d. January 1282 in Nephin)
              - Maria Embriaco of Gibelletto (d. c. 1290), married Balian II Grenier, titular Lord of Sidon
            - Raimondo Embriaco of Gibelletto (es) (died after 1238)
            - Bertrando Embriaco of Gibelletto (died after 1271)
            - Agnes Embriaco of Gibelletto, married Barthelemy of Saint Simeon, Lord of Soudin
          - Ugo Embriaco of Gibelletto
          - Plaisance Embriaco of Gibelletto (d. c. 1217), married Bohemond IV of Antioch
          - Pavia, married Garnier l'Aleman
      - Raimondo Embriaco of Gibelletto (before 1135 – after 1204), married a noblewoman from Principality of Antioch, Constable of Tripoli
        - Guglielmo Embriaco of Gibelletto, married Eva
          - John de Embriaco (before 1228 – around 1262), Marshal of Jerusalem, married Femia de Cesarea, daughter of Walter III of Caesarea, lord of Cesarea, with whom he had Isabel, who married Guillermo Filangieri; then he married Juana de Lanelée, with whom he had Balian, Juan and Femia (Eufemia), who married Guido de Soissons.
      - Bertrando I Embriaco of Gibelletto (d. after 1217), married Doleta, daughter of Stephen of Armenia
        - Ugo Embriaco of Gibelletto (d. after 1264), married Marie Porcelet
          - Bertrando II Embriaco of Gibelletto (murdered 1258)
            - Barthelemy Embriaco of Gibelletto (killed on 26 April 1289 during the Fall of Tripoli), married Helvis, daughter of Pierre de Scandelion
              - Bertrando III Embriaco of Gibelletto
              - Ugo Embriaco of Gibelletto, married Catherine de la Roche
              - Agnes Embriaco of Gibelletto, married Gauvain de la Roche, then Peter Embriaco of Giblet
            - Guglielmo Embriaco of Gibelletto (murdered in January 1282 in Nephin)
            - Lucie Embriaco of Gibelletto, married Juan de Botron (es)
            - Marguerite Embriaco of Gibelletto, married Baudouin Ibelin
      - Guglielmo III Embriaco of Gibelletto (de), (d. after December 1204), married Fadie, daughter of Manasses of Hierges
      - Agnes Embriaco of Gibelletto, married Guermond II (de), with whom she had a daughter, Helvis who later married Roland de Lucca

=== Offspring of Guglielmo III ===
- Guglielmo III Embriaco of Gibelletto
  - Ugo di Gibelletto (de) (d. c. 1220), Lord of Besmedin, married Agnes de Ham and had:
    - Raimondo di Gibelletto (de) (d. c. 1253), Lord of Besmedin, married firstly Marguerite de Scandelion and secondly Alix de Soudin, and had:
      - Giovanni I di Gibelletto, married Poitevine, daughter of a Marshal of Tripoli
        - Giovanni II di Gibelletto (d. c. 1315), married Marguerite du Plessis, without issue.
        - Maria di Gibelletto
      - Ugo di Gibelletto, died young
      - Enrico di Gibelletto (de) (d. 1310), Lord of Besmedin, married Marguerite de Morf, without issue
      - Bertrando di Gibelletto, died young
      - Eschiva di Gibelletto, married Raymundo Visconti
      - Agnese di Gibelletto
      - Susanna di Gibelletto, died young
      - Maria di Gibelletto, married Guy de Montolif
    - Gerardo de Ham di Gibelletto (d. 1225)
    - Guglielmo II di Gibelletto (d. c. 1243), married Anne de Montignac, and had:
      - Eudes di Gibelletto, died young
      - Girard di Gibelletto, died young
      - Giovanni III di Gibelletto, Lord of Saint-Foucy, married Gillette d'Angiller, and had:
        - Guglielmo III di Gibelletto, married in 1318 Marie de Verny, without issue
        - Maria di Gibelletto
        - Eschiva di Gibelletto (d. c. 1350), married Simon Petit (d. 1355/1338)
      - Stefania di Gibelletto, married Amaury le Bernier
      - Maria di Gibelletto, married Amaury le Flamenc
      - Eufemia di Gibelletto, died young
      - Agnese di Gibelletto, died young
    - Adamo di Gibelletto (de), Lord of Adelon
    - Agnese di Gibelletto, married Thierry de Termonde

== See also ==
- War of Saint Sabas
- Byblos Castle
- Embriachi workshop, apparently run by later relatives
