= Genoese colonies =

Genoese territories around the Mediterranean and Black seas

Genoese colonies Colonie genovesi (it)
- Colonies of the Republic of Genoa
- 1096–1768
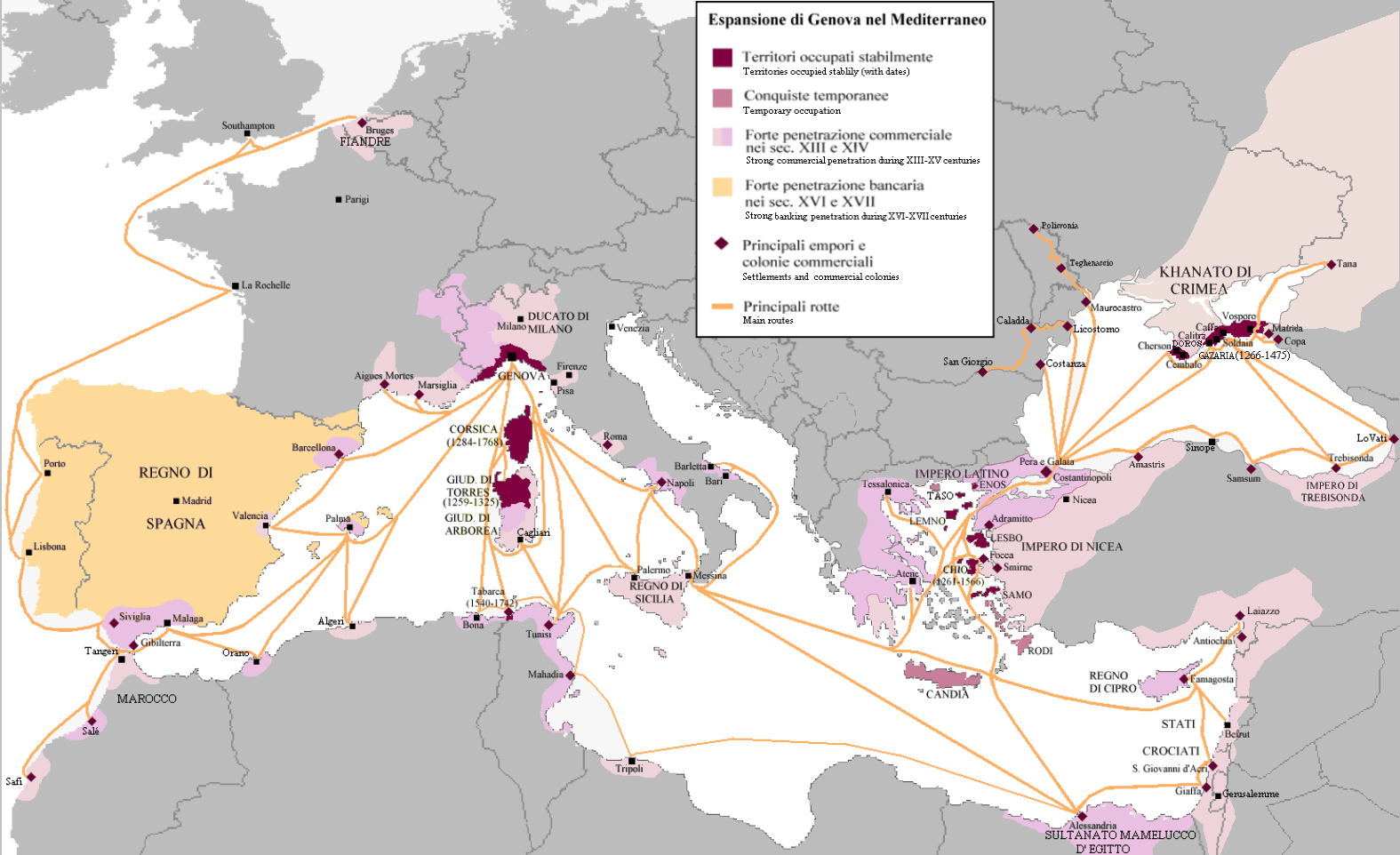
- Map of the Genoese expansion.
- Historical era: Middle Ages
  - Genoese Fleet in the First Crusade: 1096
  - Treaty of Nymphaeum: 1261
  - Creation of the Gazaria: 1266
  - Fall of most of the Eastern Mediterranean colonies: Late 15th century
  - Fall of Tabarka: 1742
  - Treaty of Versailles: 1768
  - Disestablished: 1768

The Genoese colonies were a series of economic and trade posts in the Mediterranean and Black Seas. Some of them had been established directly under the patronage of the republican authorities to support the economy of the local merchants (especially after privileges obtained during the Crusades), while others originated as feudal possessions of Genoese nobles, or had been founded by powerful private institutions, such as the Bank of Saint George.

== History ==
=== Background ===
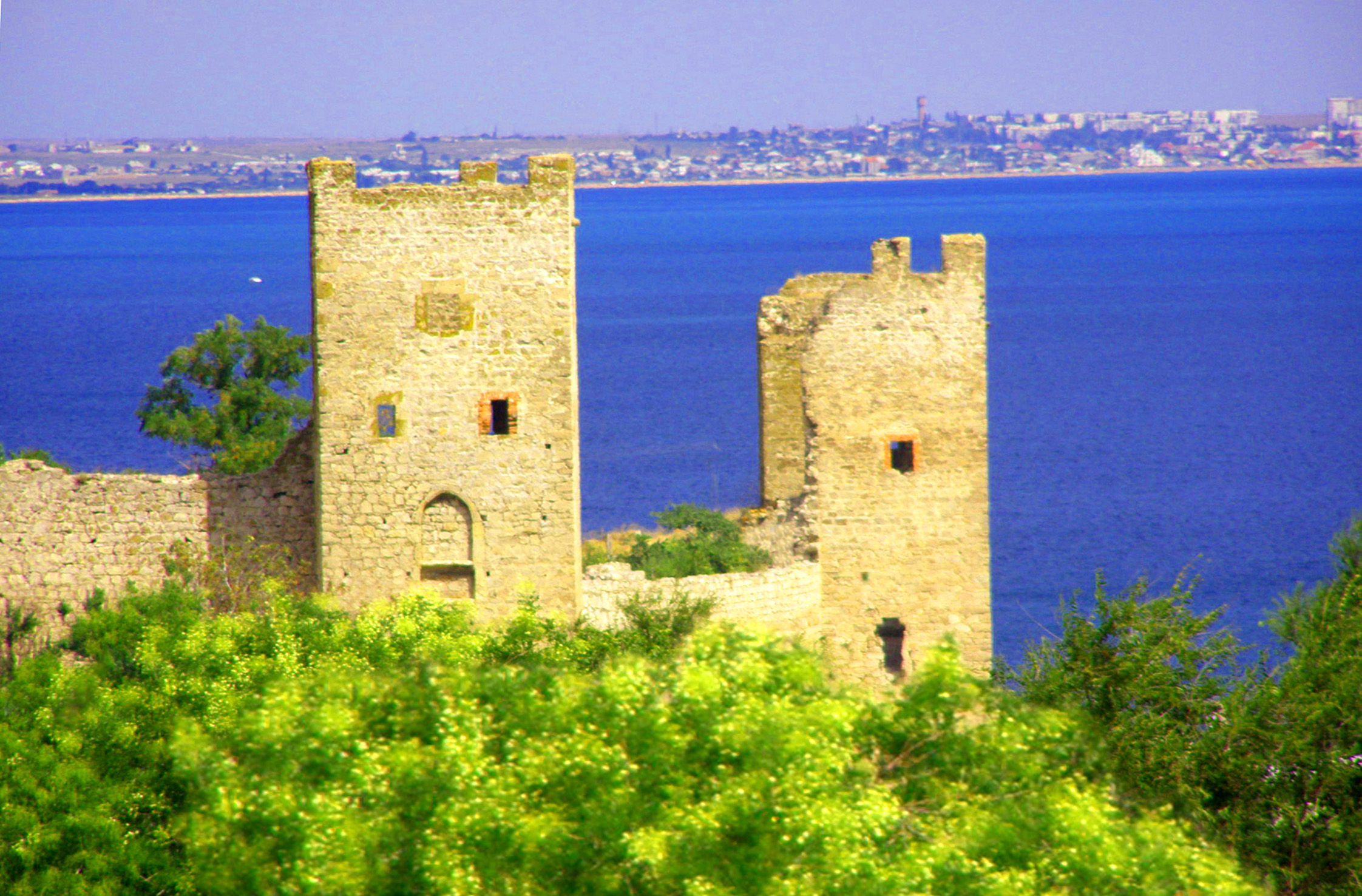
Genoese walls at Caffa, modern Feodosiya in Crimea.

During the Early Middle Ages, Genoa was a small, poor fishing village of 4,000 inhabitants. By slowly building its merchant fleet, it rose as the leading commercial carrier of the Western Mediterranean, starting to become independent from the Holy Roman Empire around the 11th century. A meeting of all the city's trade associations (compagnie) and the noble lords of the surrounding valleys and coasts eventually signaled the birth of Genoese government. The then-born city-state was known as Compagna Communis. The local organization maintained a political and social significance for centuries.

=== Possessions ===
The participation of the Genoese Fleet in the Crusades (particularly the conquests of Antioch and Acre) enriched it enormously. During the First Crusade, the Genoese Republic obtained Acre (one third of the port's incomes) and Gibelet (present-day Byblos, Lebanon), which became a familiar possession of the Embriaco family, who styled themselves as Lords of Gibeletto (1100 – late 13th century).

Other small colonies were formed in Tartous (Syria), Tripoli (Libya), and Beirut (Lebanon). However, the Muslim reconquest in the following century removed Genoese presence from the Holy Land. Genoa also established colonies on the Spanish Mediterranean coast from Valencia to Gibraltar, but these were also short-lived. These colonies consisted usually of a city quarter (or even a single square) with wooden single- or double-floor houses with workshops in the lower floor.

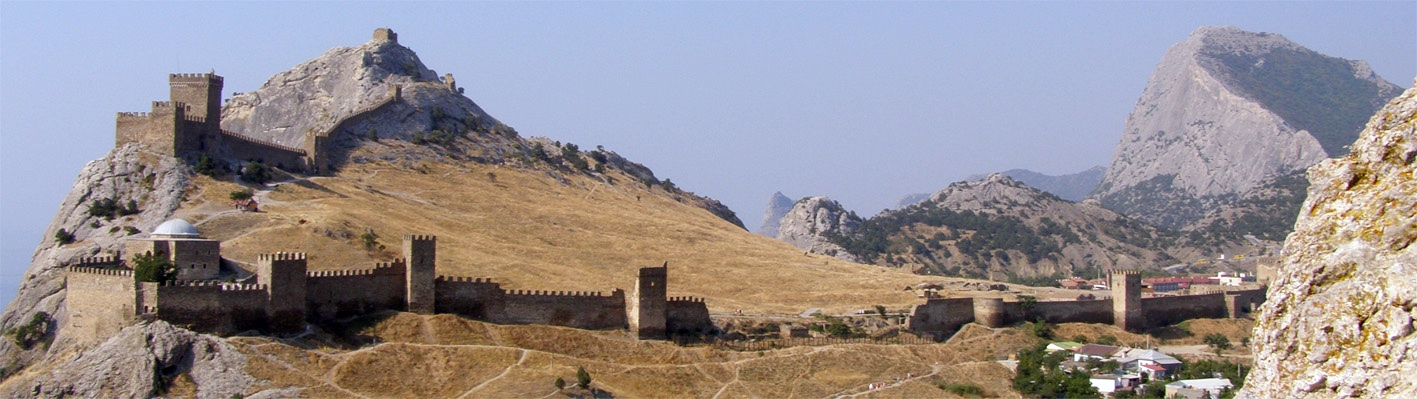
The Genoese fortress of Sudak in the Crimea

Direct territorial expansion of Genoa began in the 13th century with the occupation of Corsica (annexed in 1284 and kept until the 18th century) and northern Sardinia. Genoa remained dominant in the Tyrrhenian Sea after the decisive naval victory against Pisa in the Battle of Meloria (1284). Genoa had also started to form colonies of Ligurians in the Eastern Mediterranean and the Black Sea in second half of the 13th century. The Genoese presence was not based on military occupation, but on economic "concessions" of Genoese and Ligurian families associated with the local traders and dominant classes.

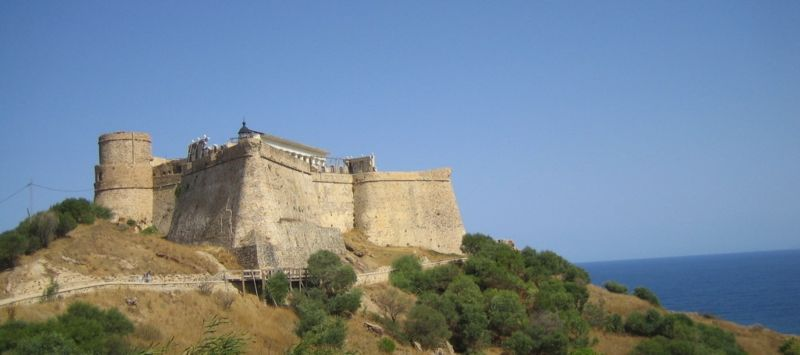
Genoese fort in Tabarka, Tunisia

In the eastern Mediterranean, Genoa was greatly advanced by the Treaty of Nymphaeum (1261) with the Byzantine emperor Michael VIII Palaeologus, which, in exchange for the aid to the Byzantine reconquest of Constantinople, actually ousted the Venetians from the straits leading to the Black Sea. The main Genoese commercial bases were Chios and Mytilene in the Aegean Sea, and Caffa, the major trading center between Mongol-ruled Eastern Europe and Central Asia and Western Europe. Other colonies included Cembalo (modern Balaklava), Soldaio (Sudak), Vosporo (Kerch), while other were located on the Azov Sea, including Tana (Azov), Matrega (Taman), Mapa (Anapa), Bata (Novorossiysk) and others, on the Abkhazian coast, such as Savastopoli (Sukhumi), or on the Ukrainian coast, such as Salmastro or Moncastro (Bilhorod-Dnistrovskyi), Ginestra (now part of Odesa).

In 1275, Genoese nobleman Manuele Zaccaria received the twin towns of Old and New Phocaea from the Byzantine Empire. Later in 1304, the Zaccaria family conquered the island of Chios, which was briefly re-conquered by the Byzantine Empire during 1329, but returned to Genoese control in 1346. In 1354, Francesco Gattilusio helped Emperor John V Palaiologos take power, which in turn received the island of Lesbos (commonly called Mytilene in the time) as a gift and dowry for marriage with the Emperor's sister. Later the Gattilusio family acquired several territories in Greek territory, such as Imbros, Samothrace, Lemnos, Thasos and Ainos (Enez). These Greek territories were very profitable for Genoa due to the mining and trade of alum, which remained one of the most lucrative commodities traded by Genoese merchants.

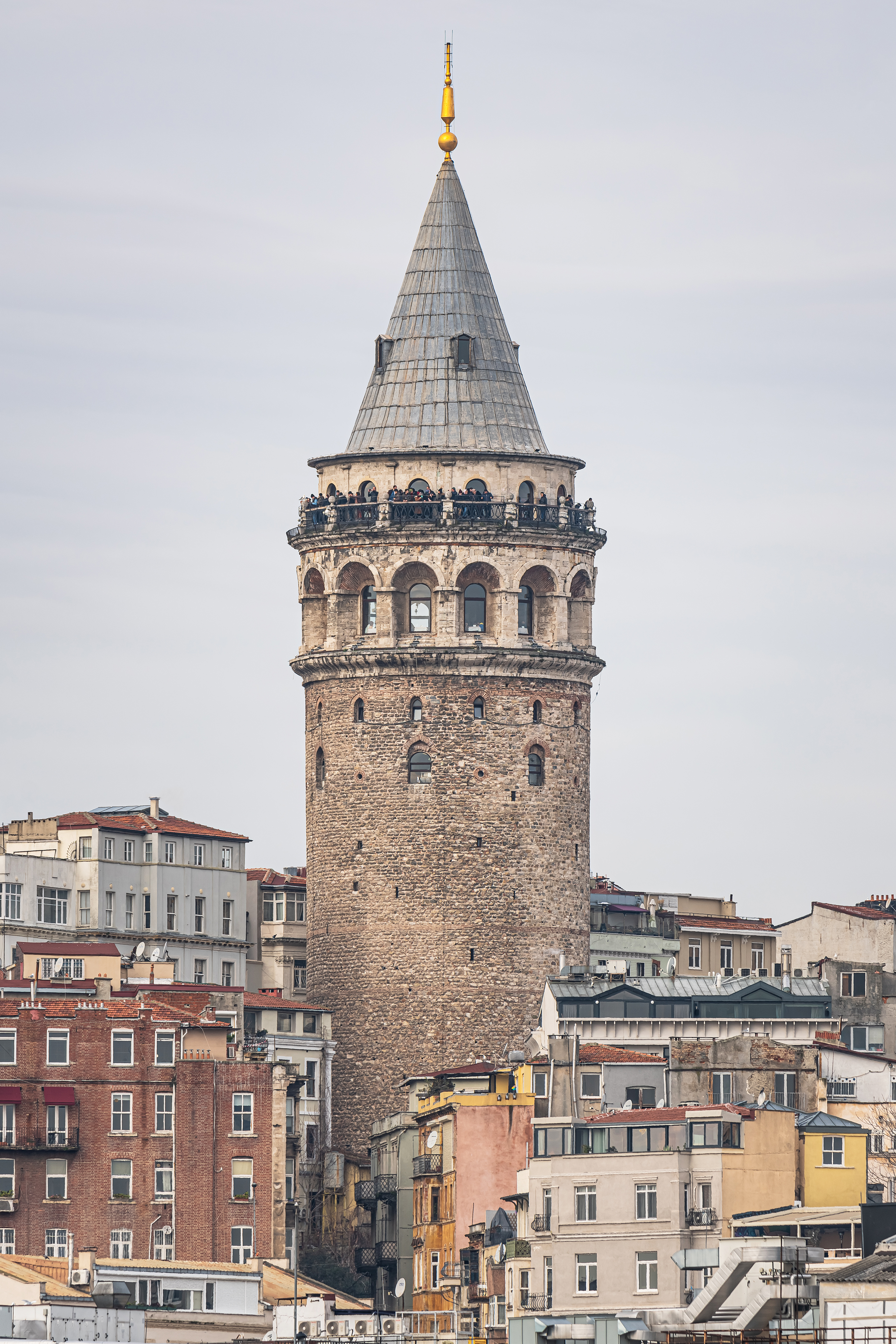
Galata Tower (1348) at the northern apex of the medieval Genoese citadel of Galata (Pera) in Istanbul, Turkey

During the greatest period of expansion, between the 13th and 15th centuries, the Republic of Genoa had many colonies and commercial/military ports in the region where is now present-day Romania. The largest Genoese colonies in the region were Calafat, Licostomo, Galați (Caladda), Constanța, Giurgiu (San Giorgio) and Vicina. These Genoese settlements served primarily to protect the maritime trade routes that made the Republic a power in this area.

In 1155, Genoa was given a fondaco (store and market quarter) at Galata (Pera), facing Constantinople, by emperor Manuel Komnenos, although in the following century the relationship with the Byzantine Empire were often strained. In 1201 the city also obtained privileges and quarters from the Kingdom of Armenia. Pera fell to the Ottoman forces in 1453, when all of Constantinople was captured. Meanwhile, Chios remained a fief of the Giustiniani family until the Ottoman conquest in 1566. There were some 33,000 descendants of the Genoese colonists in Constantinople and İzmir in 1933. Genoa had also conquered the island of Tabarka off the Tunisian coast, which was held by the Lomellini family from 1540 to 1742. Part of the latter's citizens later moved to Carloforte in Sardinia.

In addition to its possessions in Crimea, the most important Genoese colonies in the Black Sea area were Taman, Copa, Bata, Maurolaca and Mapa; most of them would survive under Genoese rule until the late 15th century.

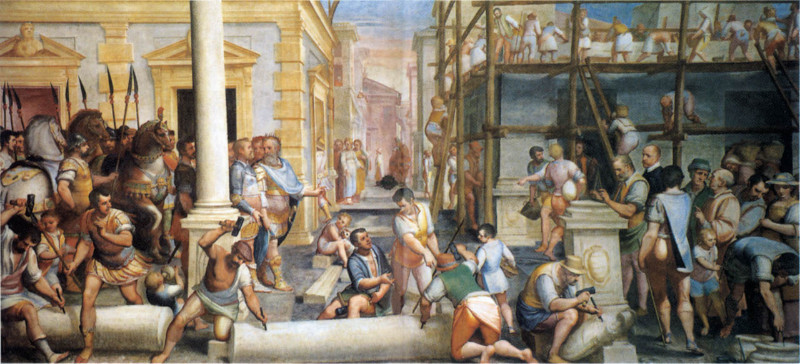
Construction of the warehouse of the Genoese in Trebizond. Painting by Luca Cambiasi, c. 1571, in the Palazzo Lercari-Parodi in Genoa

The decline of the Genoese colonies in Crimea coincided with the Ottoman expansion in the late 15th century. Aside from the Crimean cities, Genoa also lost its lands in the Taman Peninsula, which had belonged to the noble Ghisolfi family. Other losses included the commercial bases of Licostomo in Moldavia and Moncastro near Odesa. The fall of the eastern colonies caused a deep economical crisis which eventually turned into an unstoppable decline for the Republic of Genoa as a major European power. It thus moved its interests in the western Mediterranean, establishing flourishing communities in Cádiz, Lisbon and Seville. Genoa, in particular, became an efficient banking base of Habsburg Spain, supplying loans and organizing slave trade as holders of an Asiento. Genoese traders were active in Old Panama, one of the main ports on the Pacific, at least until 1671. The Spanish governor of Panama, Sebastián Hurtado de Corcuera, even recruited Peruvians, Panamanians, and Genoese in Panama to found Zamboanga City after its conquest from the Muslim Sultanates of Sulu and Maguindanao in the Philippines.

The last Genoese colonies disappeared in the 18th century: Tabarka was occupied by the Ottoman Empire (1742), and Corsica was annexed by France after the Treaty of Versailles in 1768. The Republic itself ended in 1797, when it was conquered by the French First Republic under Napoleon and replaced with the Ligurian Republic. The Republic of Genoa was restored after the War of the Sixth Coalition, on the 26 of April 1814, but was abolished and ceded to Kingdom of Sardinia on the 7 of January 1815.

== See also ==
- Stato da Màr
- Pisan colonies

== Bibliography ==
- Airaldi, Gabriella (2006). Blu come il mare - Guglielmo e la saga degli Embriaci. Genoa: Fratelli Frilli Editori. ISBN 88-7563-174-3.
- Chirikba, Viacheslav (2020). Abkhazia and Italian City-States (XIII—XV centuries). Essays on Relationships. Foreword by V.S. Tomelleri. – Sankt Petersburg: Aleteya, – 212 p., ill. ISBN 978-5-00165-119-2
- Ossian De Negri, Teofilo (2003). Storia di Genova: Mediterraneo, Europa, Atlantico. Florence: Giunti Editore. ISBN 978-88-09-02932-3.
- Lopez, R.S. (1964). "Market Expansion. The Case of Genoa". Journal of Economic History. 24 (4): 445–464. doi:10.1017/S0022050700061179. S2CID 154200021.
- Гавриленко О. А., Сівальньов О. М., Цибулькін В. В. Генуезька спадщина на теренах України; етнодержавознавчий вимір. — Харків: Точка, 2017.— 260 с. — ISBN 978-617-669-209-6
- Khvalkov E. The colonies of Genoa in the Black Sea region: evolution and transformation. L., New York : Routledge, 2017
- Khvalkov E. "Evoluzione della struttura della migrazione dei liguri e dei corsi nelle colonie genovesi tra Trecento e Quattrocento", in Atti della Società Ligure di Storia Patria, Nuova Serie'. 2017. Vol. 57 / 131 . -pp. 67–79.
- Khvalkov E. I piemontesi nelle colonie genovesi sul Mar Nero: popolazione del Piemonte a Caffa secondo i dati delle Massariae Caffae ad annum del 1423 e del 1461. In: Studi Piemontesi. 2017. No. 2. pp. 623–628.
- Khvalkov E. Campania, Puglia e Basilicata nella colonizzazione genovese dell'Oltremare nei secoli XIV – XV: Caffa genovese secondo i dati dei libri contabili. In: Rassegna Storica Salernitana. 2016. Vol. 65. pp. 11–16.
- Khvalkov E. Italia settentrionale e centrale nel progetto coloniale genovese sul Mar Nero: gente di Padania e Toscana a Caffa genovese nei secoli XIII – XV secondo i dati delle Massariae Caffae ad annum 1423 e 1461. In: Studi veneziani. Vol. LXXIII, 2016. - pp. 237–240.
- Khvalkov E. Il progetto coloniale genovese sul Mar Nero, la dinamica della migrazione Latina a Caffa e la gente catalanoaragonese, siciliana e sarda nel Medio Evo. In: Archivio Storico Sardo. 2015. Vol. 50. No. 1. pp. 265–279.
- Khvalkov E. Il Mezzogiorno italiano nella colonizzazione genovese del Mar Nero a Caffa genovese nei secoli XIII – XV (secondo i dati delle Massariae Caffae) (pdf). In: Archivio Storico Messinese. 2015. Vol. 96 . - pp. 7–11.
- Khvalkov E. Trading Diasporas in the Venetian and Genoese Trading Stations in Tana, 1430 – 1440. In: Union in Separation. Diasporic Groups and Identities in the Eastern Mediterranean (1100–1800). Heidelberg : Springer, 2015. pp. 311–327.
- Khvalkov E. "Everyday Life and Material Culture in the Venetian and Genoese Trading Stations of Tana in the 1430s (Based on the Study of Notarial Documents)", in Medium Aevum Quotidianum. 2012. Vol. 64. pp. 84–93.
