= Daniel I of Adelon =

Daniel I of Adelon or Daniel of Termonde (before 1204 – after 1225) was Lord of Adelon in the Kingdom of Jerusalem.

== Life ==
A son of Thierry de Termonde (died 1206), constable of Constantinople, and Agnese of Gibelet-Besmedin, Lady of Adelon, he inherited the Lordship of Adelon via his mother. In 1225 he accompanied Isabella II of Jerusalem on her journey from Tyre to Brindisi to marry Frederick II.

== Marriage and issue ==
His first marriage was to Isabella, daughter of Thomas of Maugasteau and sister of Philip, husband to Daniel's sister Margaret. Daniel and Isabella's marriage proved childless and after her death he married Agnes of Francleu, daughter of Gerard of Franco loco, with whom he had:

1. Daniel II, his successor as Lord of Adelon
2. Agnes, married Garnier l'Aleman (the Younger), son of Haimo l’Aleman
3. Isabella (died after 1260), married Hugo l’Aleman (died before 1241), son of Garnier l’Aleman (the Elder)

== Bibliography ==
- Charles du Cange: Les Familles d'outre-mer. Publiées par Emmanuel Guillaume-Rey. Imprimerie Impériale, Paris 1869, S. 169 ff.
