= Hugh Embriaco =

Genoese admiral and lord of Gibelet

Hugh I Embriaco (also known as Hugh I of Gibelet; died c. 1135) was a Genoese admiral and the Lord of Gibelet in the County of Tripoli.

== Biography ==
Hugh I was the son of Guglielmo Embriaco, a prominent Genoese admiral. In 1104, Guglielmo supported the Provençal Crusaders under Raymond of Saint-Gilles in the conquest of Gibelet. In recognition of Genoa's naval assistance, the city was divided, with one-third granted to the Genoese Republic.

Following in his father’s footsteps, Hugh I also commanded a Genoese fleet. In 1108, he accompanied Raymond's son, Bertrand, to the Levant. That same year, just before Bertrand's successful conquest of Tripoli, he ceded full control of Gibelet to the Genoese. Hugh was subsequently appointed as the city's first lord.

Initially, Hugh I held Gibelet as a Genoese governor, administering the city on behalf of the Republic. However, prior to his death around 1135, Gibelet was formally granted to him as a hereditary fief for a term of 20 years, in exchange for annual interest payments to Genoa. This arrangement marked the foundation of the Embriaco family's feudal lordship over Gibelet.

== Marriage and issue ==
Hugh was married to Adelasia, with whom he had at least two sons. His eldest son, William II Embriaco, succeeded him as Lord of Gibelet following his death.

== Bibliography ==
- du Cange, Charles du Fresne (1869). Emmanuel Guillaume Rey (ed.). Les familles d'outre-mer (in French). Paris: Imprimerie impériale.
- Lewis, Kevin James (2017). The Counts of Tripoli and Lebanon in the Twelfth Century. Taylor & Francis. ISBN 9781317052593.
