= Battle of Rusion =

Battle in 1206 in the Balkans

- Part of Bulgarian–Latin wars
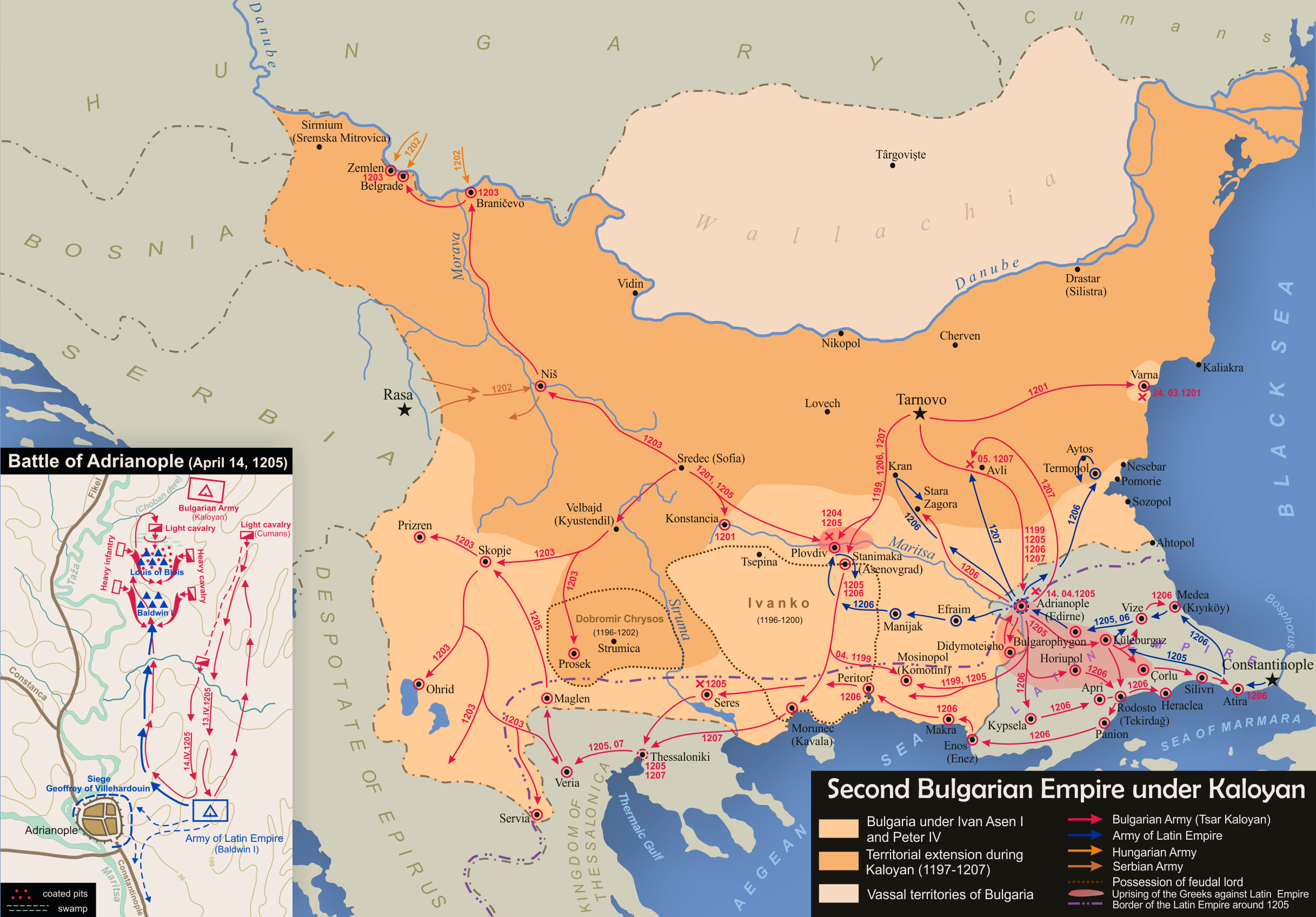
- Bulgaria under Kaloyan
Date	31 January 1206
Location	Ruskoy
Result	Bulgarian victory

Belligerents
Bulgarian Empire	Latin Empire

Commanders and leaders
Kaloyan	Thierry de Termonde †; Guillaume de Loos †; Thierry de Loos †

Strength
7,000	Unknown

Casualties and losses
Unknown	Heavy, 120 knights and thousands of soldiers

The battle of Rusion (Bulgarian: Битката при Русион) occurred in the winter of 1206 near the fortress of Rusion (Rusköy contemporary Keşan) between the armies of the Bulgarian Empire and the Latin Empire of Byzantium. The Bulgarians scored a major victory.

== Origins of the conflict ==
The great victory in the battle of Adrianople was followed by other Bulgarian victories at Serres and Plovdiv. The Latin Empire suffered heavy casualties and in the fall of 1205 the Crusaders tried to regroup and reorganize the remains of their army. Their main forces consisted of 140 knights and several thousand soldiers based in Rusion. This army was led by Thierry de Termonde and Thierry de Looz who were among the most notable nobles of the Latin Empire of Constantinople.

== Battle ==
In mid January 1206 the Bulgarian army marched southwards. Part of the troops besieged Adrianople and the others under the personal command of Kaloyan headed to Rusion. According to his battle plan he had to force the Latins to leave the fortress and, to attract them, he sent a small company of Cuman raiders to seize a small and insignificant castle in the vicinity. Kaloyan presumed on the ignorance and lack of discipline of the Crusaders. The maneuver worked - in the evening of 30 January the Crusaders marched from the city gates. Thierry de Loos had been recalled to Constantinople and now Thierry de Termonde, who was known as a recklessly brave man, remained in charge. The Byzantine historian Niketas Choniates wrote that his troops were the bravest in the whole Latin army. Around 120 knights and many cavalrymen set off from Rusion and rode the whole night. In the morning of 31 January they reached the castle, but found it deserted and headed back to Rusion. In the meantime 7,000 Bulgarians went round the Crusaders and took positions at 7 km before the walls of Rusion. The defenders of the fortress were few and could only watch from the towers. From there they could see the approaching Latin army divided into four detachments. The advanced guard was led by Charles de Fren, then followed the troops of Termonde and the detachment of Andres Deboas and Jean de Choasy who were the first knights to climb the walls of Constantinople in 1204. The last detachment was under the command of Guillaume de Loos, brother of Thierry de Loos.

The battle began in the rear-guard. The detachment of Guillaume de Loos was attacked by another Bulgarian force and, despite a desperate resistance, was routed. The survivors mixed up with the troops in front of them, but soon the next two Crusader detachments were also defeated. The battle was fought while the armies were on the march and the masses of fighting soldiers were slowly moving to Rusion. At about 2 km from the fortress the Crusader battle formation finally collapsed under the Bulgarian assaults from both sides. The knights fought bravely, but most of them perished: only ten out of the initial 120 managed to reach Rusion. Thousands of ordinary soldiers were killed in the battle or captured. All Crusader commanders including Thierry de Termonde perished. The remains of the crushed army abandoned Rusion and sought refuge to the nearby town of Rodosto.

== Further developments ==
Rodosto was well-fortified town with a large garrison of Venetians consolidated by the survivors from Rusion and a company of 2,000 men who arrived later. However, when Kaloyan arrived the defenders panicked and after a short battle were completely defeated and Rodosto was looted. Many more towns were soon seized such as Perint, Chorlu, Arkadiopolis, Messina and Daonion. The Bulgarians besieged the important town of Didymoteicho which was taken in the following year.

== Aftermath ==
In the whole military operation the Crusaders lost more than 200 knights, many thousands of soldiers and several Venetian garrisons were completely annihilated. The new Emperor of the Latin Empire Henry of Flanders had to ask the French King for another 600 knights and 10,000 soldiers. Geoffrey of Villehardouin compared the defeat with the disaster at Adrianople. However, the Crusaders were lucky - in 1207 Tsar Kaloyan was killed during the siege of Thessaloniki and the new Emperor Boril who was a usurper needed time to enforce his authority.
