= Garnier l'Aleman =

Werner of Egisheim (died after 1231) was a German Crusader, better known by his French name of Garnier l’Aleman (Werner the German).

Belonging to a German noble family from Egisheim in Alsace, he is first recorded in Acre in the entourage of a count Berthold, presumably Berthold, Duke of Merania, who besieged Acre during the Third Crusade in 1190. Berthold withdrew by spring 1191 and returned home, but Werner remained in the Holy Land. In May 1206 one Otto von Henneberg issued a certificate with "Wernerus de Egisheim" as a witness.

From September 1210 Werner and Philip of Ibelin were responsible for the defence of Acre whilst the rest of the Crusader nobility attended the coronation of Maria of Montferrat and John of Brienne in Tyre. In 1218 he and troops from the Republic of Genoa unsuccessfully tried to defend Caesarea from an Ayyubid assault.

Before Frederick II (who took the regency of the Kingdom of Jerusalem in his son's name) ended his crusade and returned to Italy, he appointed Werner and Balian of Sidon his deputies or bailiffs in the Kingdom, with Werner in Acre and Balian in Tyre. Both were replaced as bailiffs in 1231 by marshal Richard Filangieri.

Werner married Pavia Embriaco, a daughter of Hugh III Embriaco and Stephanie of Milly. They had three children:

- John Aleman (died in 1264 or after), Lord of Caesarea (de iure uxoris), married Margarethe Brisebarre, daughter of John of Caesarea;
- Hugo (died before 26 March 1241), married Isabella von Adelon (died after 1260), daughter of Daniel I of Adelon;
- Helvis, married Baldwin of Longuevaux.

== Bibliography ==
- Peters, Edward, ed. (1971). Christian Society and the Crusades, 1198-1229 (2nd ed.). University of Pennsylvania Press.
- Reinhold Röhricht: Die Deutschen im Heiligen Lande. Chronologisches Verzeichnis derjenigen Deutschen, welche als Jerusalempilger und Kreuzfahrer sicher nachzuweisen oder wahrscheinlich anzusehen sind (c. 650–1291). Wagner, Innsbruck 1894.
