= John of Gibelet =

John of Gibelet or John Embriaco (born before 1228 – died c. 1262) was a nobleman from the Embriaco family of the Crusader States and served as Marshal of the Kingdom of Jerusalem.

== Biography ==
John was the only son of William of Gibelet and his wife Eva. His paternal grandfather was Raymond of Gibelet, who held the office of Constable of the County of Tripoli.

John held the position of Marshal of the Kingdom of Jerusalem, a senior military office responsible for organizing the kingdom’s armed forces. In February 1261, John participated in a major raid near Tiberias on the Sea of Galilee, led by John II, Lord of Beirut. The Crusader force was routed by Turcomen, and several leaders were captured, then released after a ransom of 20,000 bezants was paid.

He died around 1262.

== Marriages and issue ==
John married twice:

- His first wife was Femie of Caesarea, daughter of Walter III of Caesarea, Lord of Caesarea. They had one daughter:
  - Isabella, who married Wilhelm Filangieri
- His second wife was Johanna of Lanelée, with whom he had two sons and a daughter:
  - Balian
  - John
  - Femie (also known as Euphemia), who married Guido of Soissons

== Bibliography ==
- Barber, Malcolm (2012). The New Knighthood: A History of the Order of the Temple. Cambridge University Press. ISBN 9781107604735.
- Bronstein, Judith (2005). The Hospitallers and the Holy Land: Financing the Latin East, 1187-1274. Boydell Press. ISBN 9781843831310.
- Burgtorf, Jochen (2008). The Central Convent of Hospitallers and Templars: History, Organization, and Personnel (1099/1120-1310). Brill. ISBN 9789004166608.
