= Stephanie of Milly, Lady of Gibelet =

Stephanie of Milly
- Lady of Gibelet
- Spouse(s): William Dorel, Lord of Botron; Hugh III Embriaco
- Issue: Cécile; Guido I Embriaco; Hugo; Plaisance of Gibelet; Pavie
- Father: Henry of Milly or of Nablus

Stéphanie of Milly (fl. 1197), was a noblewoman of the Crusades.

== Family ==
Stéphanie was the second daughter of a noblewoman named Agnes and Henry of Milly or of Nablus, lord of Petra, one of the vassal fiefs of the Lordship of Transjordan in the Kingdom of Jerusalem. She had three surviving sisters, who all married into the leading families of the Crusader States. Helvis of Milly, who married Adam III of Bethsan; Agnes of Milly, who married Joscelin of Courtenay, titular count of Edessa; and Sibille of Milly, who married Eustace "le Petit". Stéphanie's paternal uncles included Guy of Milly [fr], seneschal of the Kingdom of Jerusalem, and Philip of Milly, the lord of Transjordan and the grand master of the Knights Templar.

Her first husband was William Dorel, Lord of Botron, with whom she had a daughter, Cécile.

After William's death, she married Hugh III Embriaco, (before 1164 – c. 1196) around 1179. The Embriaco family were a prominent Genoese family in the Crusader states. In 1184, Hugh succeeded his father, Hugh II, as Lord of Gibelet (Byblos) in the County of Tripoli. Hugh died in 1196.

In 1197, Stéphanie is known to have accompanied an army to besiege Byblos, which had been captured by the Muslims, and bribed a guard to open up the city to them. She seemed to have died soon after this.

With Hugh, Stephanie of Milly had four children, two sons: Guido I Embriaco (c. 1180; died after September 1238) and Hugo, and two daughters: Plaisance of Gibelet (died 1217), who married Bohemond IV of Antioch and Pavie, who married Garnier l'Aleman and became the mother of John Aleman, known as John II, Lord of Caesarea within the Crusader Kingdom of Jerusalem, through his wife, Margaret of Caesarea from at least 1243 until his death after 1263.

== Bibliography ==
- Frankel, Rafael (1988). "Topographical notes on the territory of Acre in the Crusader period". Israel Exploration Journal. 38 (4): 249–272. JSTOR 27926125.
