= Bertrand Embriaco =

Bertrand Embriaco (died after 1258) was a nobleman of Genoese origin and a prominent member of a younger branch of the Embriaco family, lords of Gibelet in the County of Tripoli.

== Biography ==
Bertrand was the son of Hugh Embriaco and Maria Porcelet. Through his father’s line, he was the grandson of Bertrand Embriaco and Doleta of Armenia, daughter of the Rupenid prince Stephen of Armenia, making him a great-grandson of William II Embriaco, Lord of Gibelet.

== Rebellion against Bohemond VI ==
In 1252, tensions rose in the County of Tripoli after Princess Lucienne of Segni lost the regency to her son Bohemond VI of Antioch. Though removed from power, Lucienne retained influence through her supporters, which provoked unrest among the local nobility.

By 1258, during the War of Saint Sabas, discontented barons rallied around Bertrand Embriaco, whose estates surrounded the Lordship of Gibelet. Supported by his son-in-law John of Botron, Lord of Botron and a relative of Bohemond VI, Bertrand led a revolt against the prince. The rebels marched on Tripoli, besieging the city. During the conflict, Bertrand personally wounded Bohemond in battle.

Bohemond remained trapped until he was rescued by Templar reinforcements. In retaliation, Bertrand burned the surrounding countryside. However, while visiting one of his villages later that year, Bertrand was ambushed and assassinated by armed peasants. His severed head was sent to Bohemond as a grim trophy. Following his death, hostilities between the Embriaco family and the House of Antioch deepened, sparking a prolonged feud.

== Marriage and issue ==
He married Béatrix de Saint-Siméon, with whom he had several children:

- Bartholomew (d. 1289 during the Fall of Tripoli), who served as regent of Gibelet for Peter Embriaco. He married Helvise of Scandalion and had issue:
  - Bertrand (†1289), regent of Tripoli, married a lady of Gibelet.
  - Hugh, who married Catherine de La Roche.
  - Agnes, who married Gauvain de La Roche, and later Peter Embriaco, Lord of Gibelet.
- William, executed in 1282 at Nephin alongside his cousins Guy, John, and Baldwin by order of Bohemond VII of Tripoli.
- Lucie, who married John of Botron, Lord of Botron.
- Marguerite, who married Baldwin of Ibelin.

== Bibliography ==
- Decker, Sarah Ifft (2016). Laura L. Gathagan; William North (eds.). The Haskins Society Journal 27: Studies in Medieval History. Boydell & Brewer. ISBN 9781783271481.
- Runciman, Steven (1994). A History of the Crusades Volume 3. University of Michigan.
- Wolff, Robert Lee; Hazard, Harry W. (2017). A History of the Crusades, Volume 2: The Later Crusades, 1189-1311. University of Pennsylvania Press. ISBN 9781512819564.
