= Raymond of Gibelet =

Raymond Embriaco, also known as Raymond of Gibelet (died after 1204), was a nobleman of Genoese origin and a member of the prominent Embriaco family of Gibelet, in the County of Tripoli.

== Biography ==
Raymond was the second son of William II Embriaco, Lord of Gibelet, and his wife Sancha, who was of Provençal origin. Following William II's death around 1159, the lordship of Gibelet passed to Raymond's elder brother, Hugh II Embriaco.

In 1181, Raymond was appointed constable of the County of Tripoli, a high-ranking military and administrative position. He held this office at least until 1183. Raymond participated in the Battle of Hattin, which ended in defeat. He then took refuge in Tyre before traveling to Tripoli, where he was reunited with his wife, Countess Eschiva.

He died sometime after 1204.

== Marriage and issue ==
Raymond had at least one known child:

- William Embriaco, who married Eve, a noblewoman from the Principality of Antioch. They had a son:
  - John of Gibelet, who later became Marshal of the Kingdom of Jerusalem.

== Bibliography ==
- La Monte, John L. (1932). Feudal Monarchy in the Latin Kingdom of Jerusalem, 1100 to 1291. Mediaeval academy of America.
- Lewis, Kevin James (2017). The Counts of Tripoli and Lebanon in the Twelfth Century. Taylor & Francis. ISBN 9781317052593.
