= Scandelion Castle =

Castle in Lebanon

Coordinates: 33.1558°N 35.1639°E

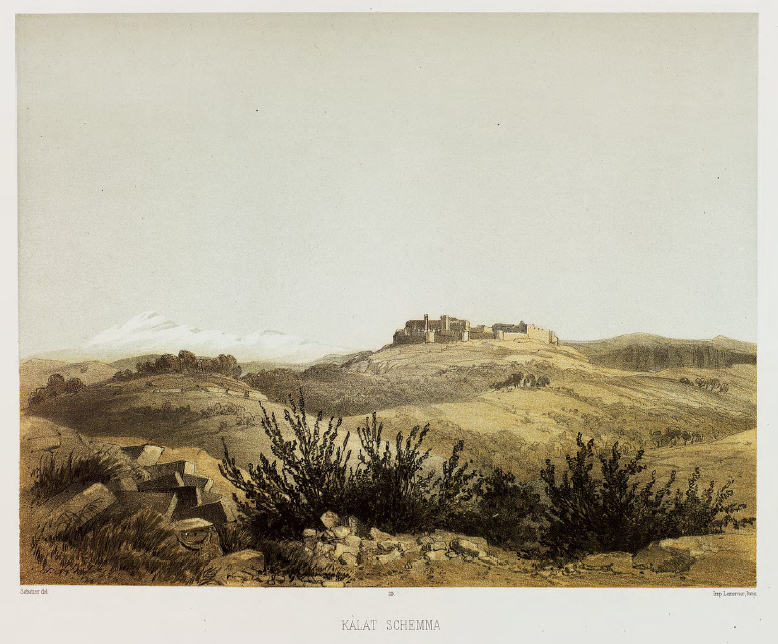
"Kal'at Sham'aa" - illustration by Dutch painter Charles William Meredith van de Velde, who travelled the region in 1851

The Scandelion Castle was built by the Crusaders in what is today South Lebanon in 1116, during the reign of Baldwin I of Jerusalem. Other sources indicate that they took the town known in medieval Arabic as Iskandarouna (Iskandaruna), called by the Crusaders Scandelion or Scandalion / Scandalium, in 1124. It became a strategic high ground, used to defend Tyre. The site is today at the Lebanese village of Shamaa.

== See also ==
- List of Crusader castles
