= Hugh III Embriaco =

Hugh III Embriaco or Hugo III of Gibelet (also called "The Limping One"; French: le Boiteux; born before 1164 – died c. 1196) was the Lord of Gibelet, located in the County of Tripoli.

== Biography ==
Hugh III was the son of Hugh II Embriaco, Lord of Gibelet. Upon his father's death around 1184, he succeeded him as ruler of the city.

Like his predecessor, Hugh III promoted the interests of Genoese merchants, particularly the powerful viscount families who dominated trade between Genoa and Syria. This policy allowed the Embriaco family to assert increasing autonomy from the Genoese Republic itself—an evolution that drew protests from Popes Alexander III and Urban III, though without tangible consequences.

In 1187, during the Battle of Hattin, Hugh was captured by Sultan Saladin. In order to secure his release, he was forced to cede Gibelet. The city was later reclaimed by his son Guido I Embriaco during Emperor Henry VI's Crusade of 1197.

== Marriage and issue ==
By 1179 at the latest, Hugh III had married Stephanie of Milly, the widow of William Dorel, Lord of Botron. They had four children:

- Guido I, Lord of Gibelet – married Alice of Antioch, daughter of Bohemond III
- Hugo
- Plaisance (d. 1217) – married Prince Bohemond IV of Antioch
- Pavia – married Werner of Egisheim (also known as Garnier l’Aleman)

== Bibliography ==
- Crofts, F.S. (1928). Louis John Paetow (ed.). The Crusades, and Other Historical Essays. Oxford University.
- Kennedy, Hugh (1994). Crusader Castles. Cambridge University Press. ISBN 9780521799133.
- Siedschlag, Beatrice Nina (1932). Jocelyn III de Courtenay, a Crusading Baron of the Twelfth Century. University of Minnesota.
