= Henry I Embriaco =

Henry I Embriaco (also known as Henry I of Gibelet; born after October 1, 1214 – died before June 2, 1271) was the Lord of Gibelet from 1241 until his death in 1271. He was a member of the prominent Embriaco family.

== Biography ==
Henry was the son of Guido I Embriaco and Alice of Antioch, herself the daughter of Bohemond III of Antioch.

During the War of Saint Sabas in 1256, Henry aligned with the Republic of Genoa, honoring his family's Genoese roots by sending Genoese troops to Acre. His overlord, Bohemond VI, attempted to remain neutral but leaned toward the Republic of Venice. Tensions between Bohemond VI and the Embriaco family escalated, and by 1261, their feud had erupted into open conflict.

With Genoese support, Henry I effectively asserted his independence from Bohemond VI. His cousin Bertrand Embriaco even launched an attack on Bohemond in Tripoli. This hostility persisted beyond Henry's death in 1271. It was only in 1282 that the conflict was settled, when Bohemond’s son and successor, Bohemond VII, captured Henry's sons Guido II, Giovanni, and Baldovino.

== Marriage and issue ==
In 1250, Henry married Isabelle d'Ibelin, daughter of Balian of Beirut. Together, they had five children:

1. Baliano (died 26 August 1313 in Nicosia)
2. Guido II (died 1282 in Nephin), succeeded his father as Lord of Gibelet (1271–1282)
3. Giovanni (died 1282 in Nephin)
4. Baldovino (died 1282 in Nephin)
5. Maria (died c. 1290), who married Balian II Grenier, titular Lord of Sidon

== Bibliography ==
- Decker, Sarah Ifft (2016). Laura L. Gathagan; William North (eds.). The Haskins Society Journal 27: Studies in Medieval History. Boydell & Brewer. ISBN 9781783271481.
- Runciman, Steven (1987). A History of the Crusades Volume 3. Cambridge University Press.
- Tyerman, Christopher (2007). God's War: A New History of the Crusades. Penguin UK. ISBN 9780141904313.
- Wolff, Robert Lee; Hazard, Harry W. (2017). A History of the Crusades, Volume 2: The Later Crusades, 1189-1311. University of Pennsylvania Press. ISBN 9781512819564.
