= Embriaci Tower =

- Torre Embriaci or Torre degli Embriaci
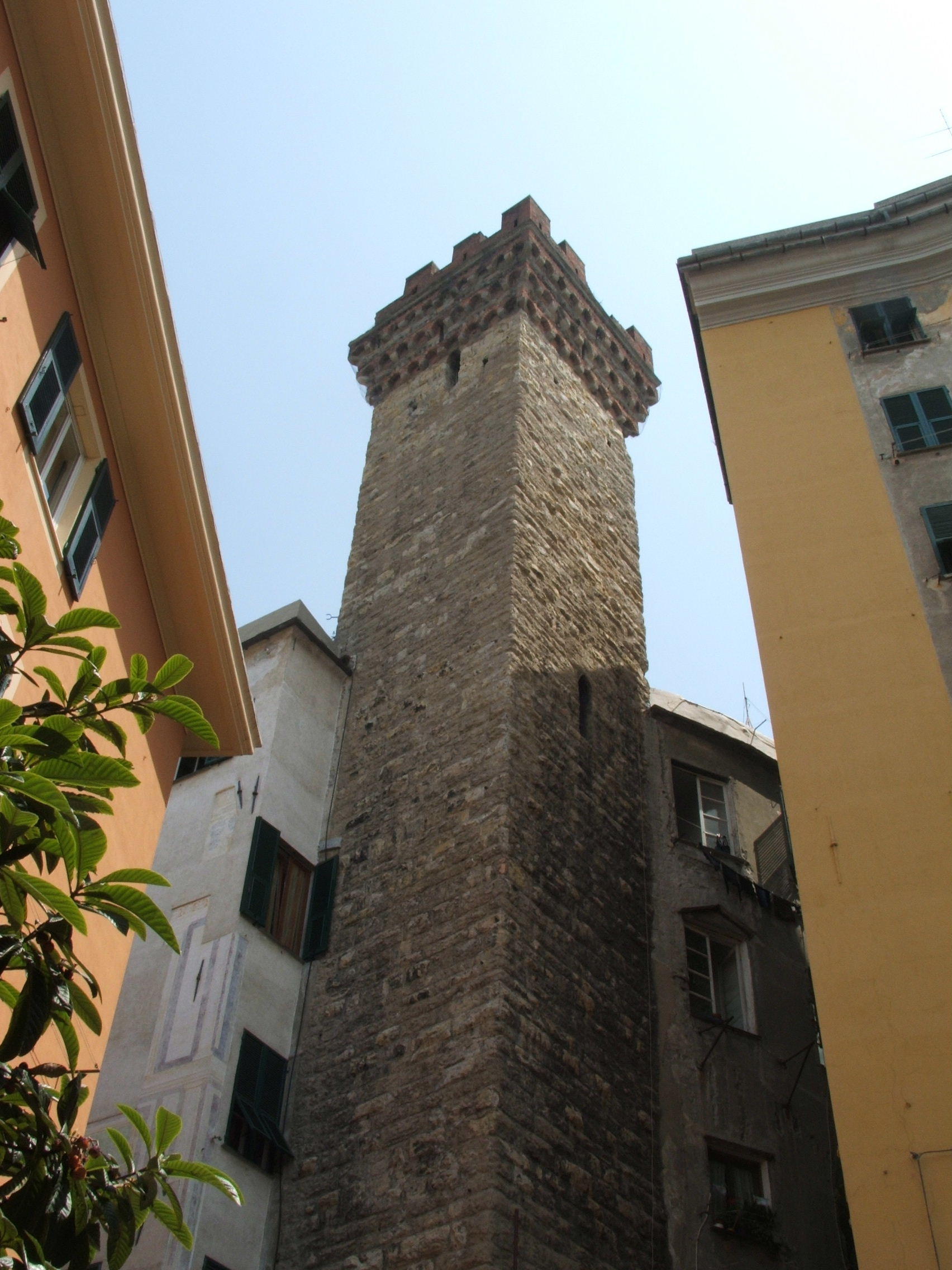
- Embriaci Tower

General information
- Coordinates: 44.4059°N 8.9293°E

The Torre Embriaci, also called Torre degli Embriaci, located in the oldest area of Genoa, where the Castello o Castrum stood.
It is the only one of the numerous towers that were located in the current historic center of Genoa to have been spared by the edict of 1196 which wanted to cut all the city towers to 80 palms.

== History ==
The construction of the tower is linked to the name of the famous Guglielmo Embriaco who, together with his brother Primo di Castello's fleet, distinguished himself in the Christian conquest of Jerusalem in 1099, during First Crusade. The construction of the tower dates back to the early 12th century. The massive structure in large blocks of rusticated stone, 41 meters high, has slits in the curtain walls for lighting and at the top is crowned by a triple frame of increasingly projecting hanging arches. The motif of the hanging arches on stone shelves, surmounted by the sawtooth frame, is found in almost all the churches of the time, but its repetition in overlapping orders is undoubtedly original.
It is assumed that the material used comes from the remains of the first walls of Genoa (864), now abandoned, which ran not far away, while the technique was always the normal one used in the early Middle Ages on the model of the late Roman period.
In the following centuries the ownership of the tower passed from the Embriaco family to the Cattaneo family and then to the Brignole Sale family.

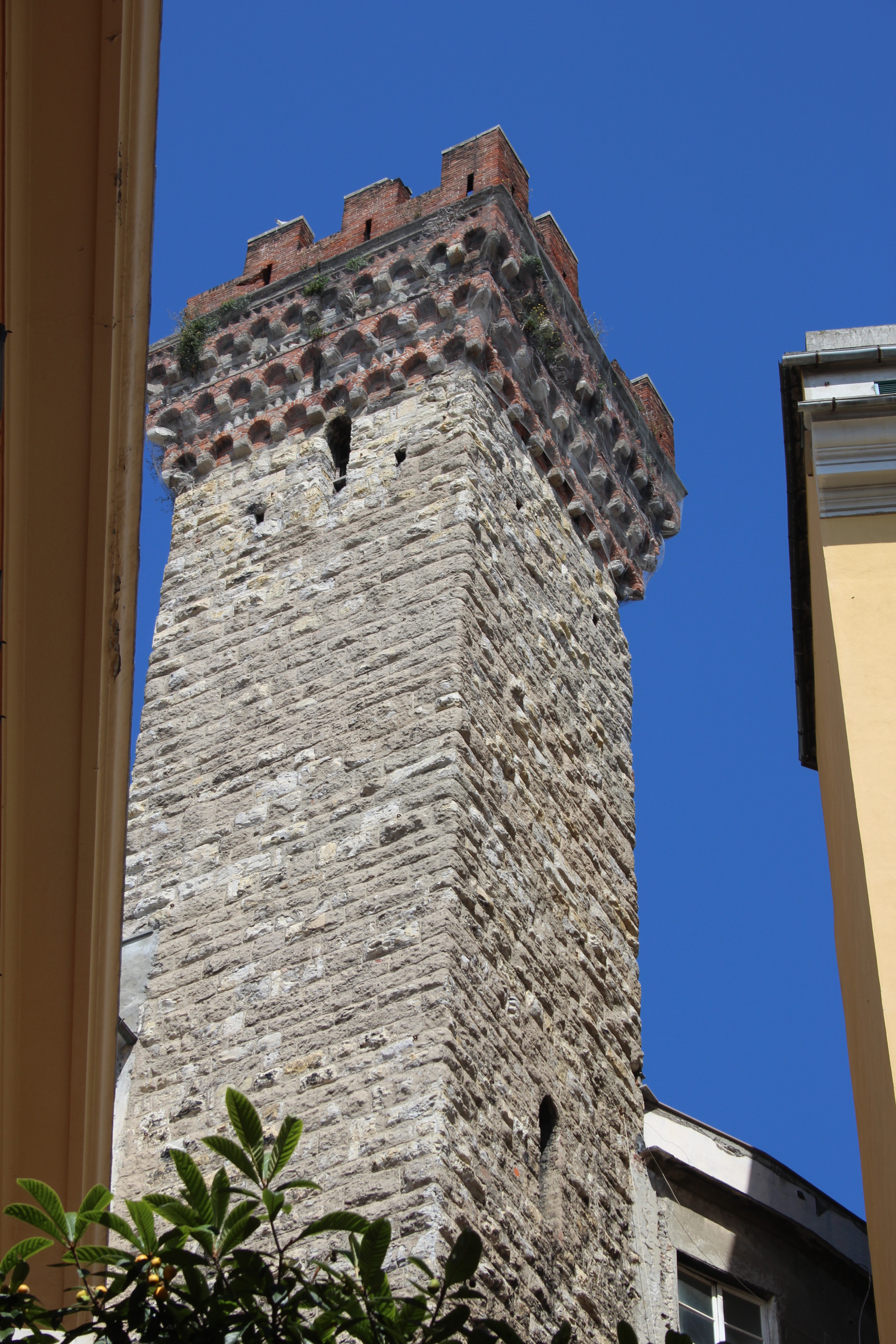

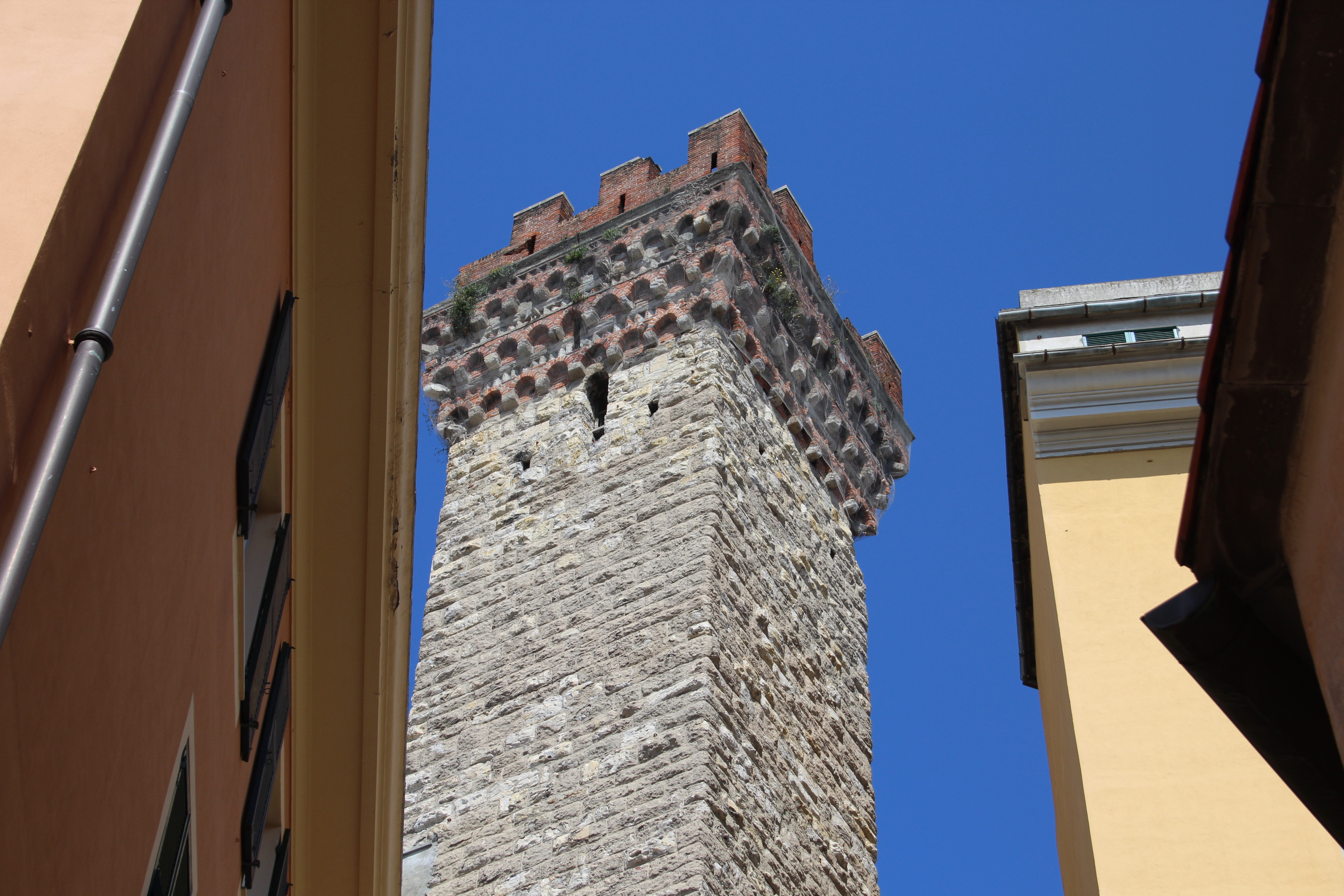

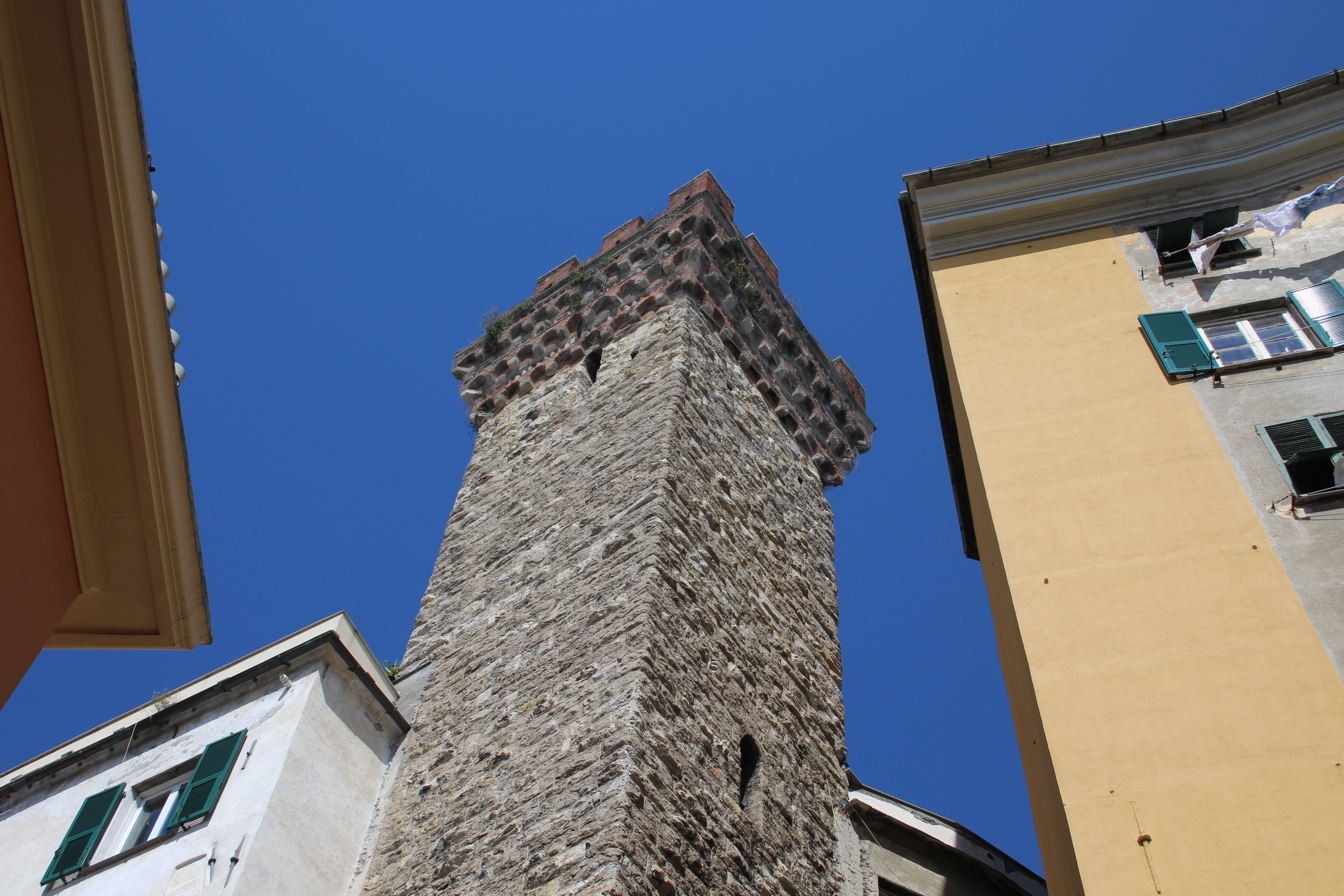

== Palazzo Giulio Sale ==
Palazzo Giulio Sale, also known as Palazzo Brignole Sale, is today divided into a housing units in Piazza Embriaci n.5, was originally identified as a domus with a tower of the Embriaco family, the palace was ceded to the Cattaneo family in 1514. In 1583 it was bought by Giulio Sale who restructured it two years later. In 1607 the ownership of the palace passed to Giovanni Francesco I Brignole Sale (Doge of Genoa in 1635 - 1637). He had some architectural modifications to the palace made which are currently not very visible and some frescoes attributed to Giovanni Andrea Ansaldo, still present today. The palace remains of the Brignole Sale family until 1869.

== See also ==
- Guglielmo Embriaco
- Embriaco family
- First Crusade
