= Stephen of Armenia =

Stephen of Armenia (Armenian: Ստեփան Հայաստանի, 1111 – 1162) was the marshal of Armenia, the son of Leo I, Prince of Armenia and Beatrice of Rethel.

His father made him marshal in 1138, due to the invasion of Emperor John II Comnenus, and escaped capture by sheltering in Edessa. In 1157, he began raiding Byzantine territories around Marash against his half-brother Thoros' will, although he failed to capture Marash itself. The Byzantine governor of Tarsus, Andronicus Euphorbenus, invited him to a banquet. Stephen's corpse was found the next day and it was believed Andronicus murdered him. Thoros avenged his death with a massacre of Greeks within his territories, which would have led to war had King Amalric of Jerusalem not intervened to bring about a peace.

He had at least three children by his wife Rita of Barbaron:

- Ruben III
- Leo II
- Dolete, who married Bertrand Embriaco
