= Guy II Embriaco =

Guy II or Guido II, surnamed Embriaco (died 1282), was the lord of Gibelet (Arabic Jubayl, Greek Byblos) from about 1271 until his death.

Guy was the eldest son of Henry I Embriaco and Isabella of the House of Ibelin, a daughter of Lord Balian of Beirut. For this reason, the Gestes des Chyprois call him Guy of Ibelin. He was a cousin of Count Bohemond VII. He succeeded his father as lord of Gibelet not long before 2 June 1271.

According to the Lignages d'Outremer, Guy married Margaret, daughter of Count Julian of Sidon. They were related within the prohibited degree. On 1 October 1274, Guy named his daughter Mary as his heir if he died without sons and made his uncle Bertrand her guardian. He became a lay brother of the Knights Templar around 1276.

Between 1276 and 1282, Guy was embroiled in a war with the Countess Sibyl and Bishop Bartholomew of Tortosa, regents of the County of Tripoli for the young Bohemond VII. The conflict was provoked by the marriage of the heiress of Hugh l'Aleman to Guy's brother John, which preempted her marriage to Bartholomew's nephew. Guy was allied to the Templars, the Genoese and Bishop Paul of Tripoli. The Templar grand master William of Beaujeu provided him with 30 knights.

In 1277, Bohemond came of age and continued the conflict with Guy. When Templar properties in Tripoli were attacked, Guy and the knights besieged the city. Failing in this, Guy raided several coastal settlements on his way back to Gibelet. He was forced to repel a major Tripolitanian attack on Gibelet, resulting in high casualties and a year-long truce. In this battle, Balian of Sidon, who was brother of Guy's wife and husband of Guy's sister Mary, died. The war was renewed in 1278. The Hospitaller grand master Nicholas Lorgne negotiated a new truce on 16 July 1279.

On 12 January 1282, Guy renewed his effort to take Tripoli. With his brother and a few companions, Guy entered Tripoli expecting to be greeted by his Templar allies, but owing a misunderstanding the Templar commander was absent. Fearing treachery, Guy sought refuge in the house of the Hospitallers. After an hours-long standoff, he was convinced to surrender to Bohemond on the promise that his and his companions' lives would be spared. His friends were blinded, but Bohemond had Guy, his brothers John and Baldwin and his cousin William taken to Nephin and buried up to their necks in sand in the moat. There they were left to starve to death. He died towards the end of February 1282.

In 1281, Guy and Margaret petitioned Pope Martin IV for the legitimization of their children. The request was granted by Pope Nicholas IV in 1289.

Guy was the last lord of Gibelet to actually hold Gibelet. With Margaret, he had two sons—Peter, who succeeded him, and Salvius (Sylvester)—and two daughters—Mary, who married Philip of Ibelin, and Catherine, who married one John of Antioch.

== Bibliography ==
- Guillaume-Rey, Emmanuel (1895). "Les seigneurs de Giblet". Revue de l'Orient Latin. 3: 398–422 [1–25].
- Hamilton, Bernard (1980). The Latin Church in the Crusader States: The Secular Church. Farnham: Ashgate.
- Marshall, Christopher (1992). Warfare in the Latin East, 1192–1291. Cambridge: Cambridge University Press.
- Mayer, Hans Eberhard (2019). "The Life and Afterlife of Julian of Sidon". Crusades. 18: 67–92.
- Richard, Jean (1985). "The Political and Ecclesiastical Organization of the Crusader States". In Setton, Kenneth M.; Zacour, Norman P.; Hazard, Harry W. (eds.). A History of the Crusades, Volume V: The Impact of the Crusades on the Near East. Vol. 5. Madison and London: University of Wisconsin Press. pp. 193–250. ISBN 0-299-09140-6.
- Runciman, Steven (1954). A History of the Crusades, Volume III: The Kingdom of Acre and the Later Crusades. Vol. 3. Cambridge: Cambridge University Press.
