= Guglielmo Embriaco =

Italian Crusader (1040–1102)

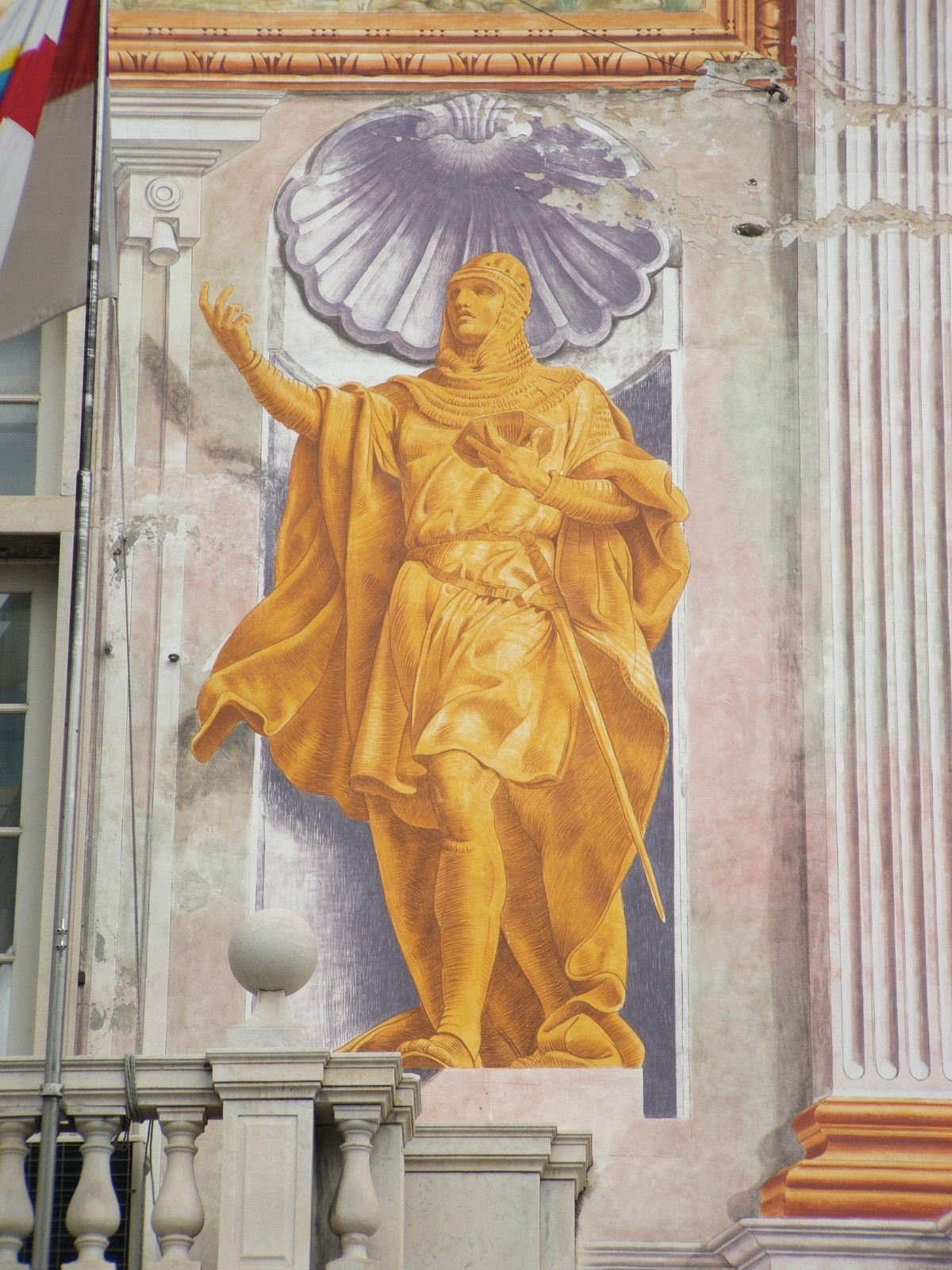
- Guglielmo Embriaco portrayed on the main façade of the Palazzo San Giorgio, Genoa
- Reign: Lordship of Gibeletto (Byblos).
- Born: c. 1040; Genoa
- Died: ?
- House: Embriaco family

Guglielmo Embriaco (Latin: Guillermus Embriacus, Ligurian: Ghigærmo de ri Embrieghi, English: William the Drunkard; born c. 1040), was a Genoese merchant and military leader who came to the assistance of the Crusader States during the First Crusade. At the end of June 1099, his fleet of 2 to 9 galleys, embarking Genoese sailors, soldiers and crossbowmen, entered the port city of Jaffa. Embriaco ordered to disassemble the ships and brought to Jerusalem (then under siege) the Genoese men and supplies as well as the dismantled material, which he used to build war machines and siege devices that proved crucial to capture the city. On 15 July 1099, Jerusalem was taken and Embriaco earned the reputation of a liberator of the Holy Sepulchre. Embriaco is considered one of the founders of what would become the Republic of Genoa.

== Biography ==
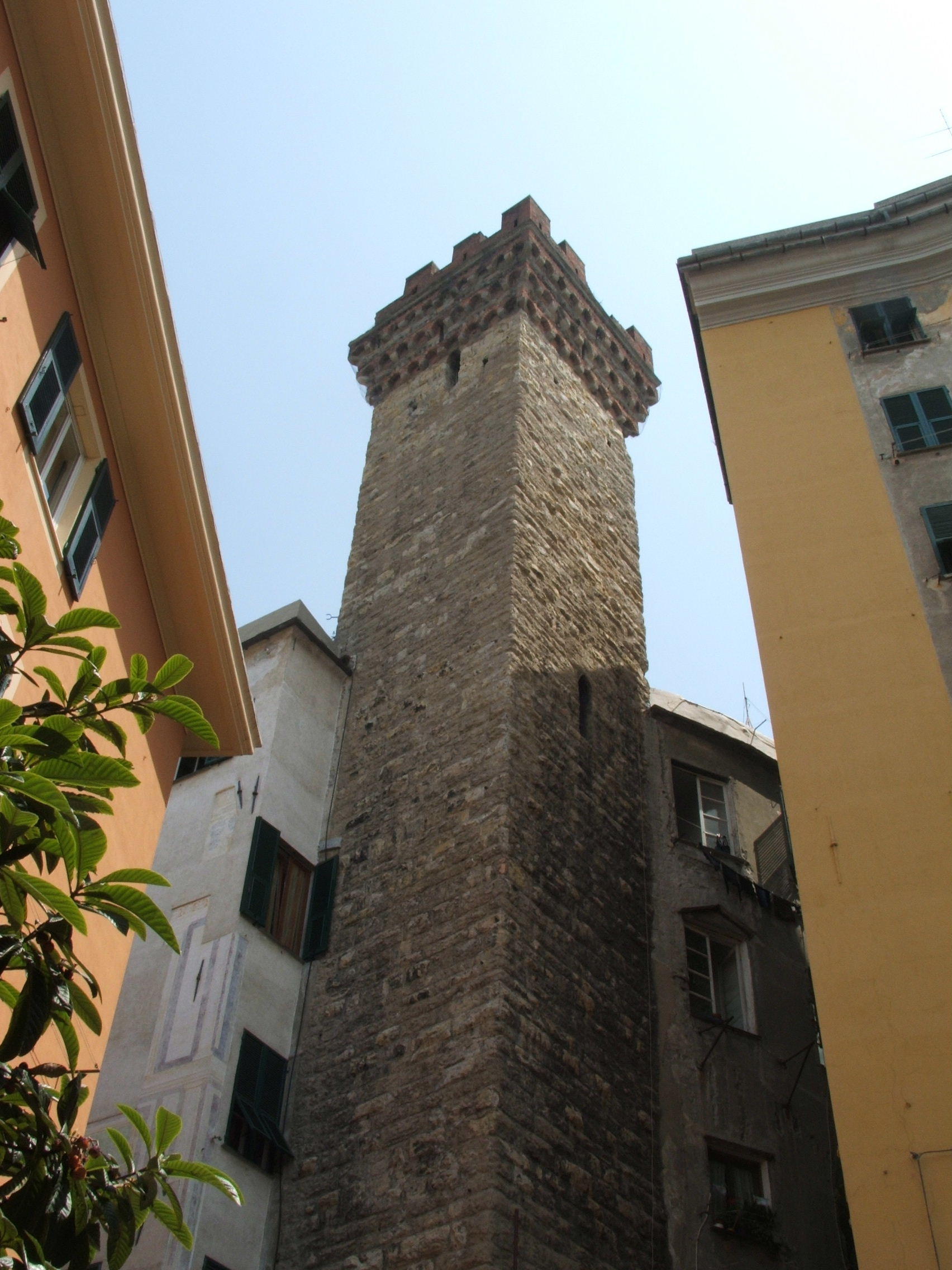
Embriaci Tower in the Castello district, in the historic centre of Genoa

Embriaco was probably born in the late 1030s, but did not gain fame until he and his brother Primo di Castello landed at Jaffa in June 1099 with a squadron of galleys: two, according to the Annales of Caffaro di Rustico, and six or nine according to Raymond of Aguilers. The expedition was a private undertaking. He and Primo initially marched south towards Ascalon, but an Egyptian army forced them to march inland towards the Siege of Jerusalem, then in progress. The lumber from their dismantled ships was converted into siege towers which were instrumental in the successful taking of the city on 15 July. It was there that Embriaco earned his sobriquet Caputmallei or Testadimaglio, meaning "mallet head".

Embriaco assisted in the capture of Jaffa and then, with 200 to 300 men, at the Battle of Ascalon on 12 August, where he commanded a naval contingent offshore. Embriaco and his brother returned to Genoa with letters from Godfrey of Bouillon and Daimbert of Pisa, the Defender of the Holy Sepulchre and Latin Patriarch of Jerusalem respectively, describing the success of the Crusaders and the urgent need of reinforcements. They arrived in Genoa on 24 December. Embriaco was granted the title of consul exercitus Ianuensium — "consul of the Genoese army" — by the Compagna and sent back with a fleet of twenty-six or seven galleys, four to six cargo ships, and three to four thousand men. He embarked, carrying the new papal legate, the cardinal-bishop of Ostia, on 1 August 1100.

Upon his second arrival in the Holy Land, he met King Baldwin I at Laodicea and together they planned a campaign against for the next spring. At Laodicea, he wintered and fought many skirmishes with the Saracen corsairs. In March 1101, he set out from Laodicea, evading a large Egyptian fleet near Haifa, and landed at Jaffa on Easter Monday. He accompanied Baldwin from there to Jerusalem to celebrate Easter and visit the River Jordan. The Genoese were promised a third of the booty of the campaign and they set out for Arsuf, which fell after three days on 9 May. Caesarea held out until 17 May. A thousand Arab merchants who had taken refuge in the mosque paid the Genoese for their release and safety.

In July 1101, Embriaco returned to Genoa after making a treaty with Tancred, Prince of Galilee. He met a Byzantine fleet in the Ionian Islands and landed at Corfu to send ambassadors to Constantinople. He entered Genoa in triumph in October.

In February 1102, he was elected Consul, but that is the last recorded trace of him.

== See also ==
- First Crusade
- Embriaco family
- Embriaci Tower
- Sacro Catino

== Bibliography ==
- Airaldi, Gabriella. Blu come il mare: Guglielmo e la saga degli Embriaci, ed. Fratelli Frilli. Genoa: 2006. ISBN 88-7563-174-3.
