= Guy I Embriaco =

Guido I Embriaco or Guy I of Gibelet (born c. 1180; died after September 1238) was "Lord (Signore) of Gib(e)let" or "Gibelletto", the modern and historic Byblos in Lebanon. He belonged to the Embriaco family.

== Life ==
He was the son of Hugh III Embriaco (died 1196) and Stephanie of Milly. Hugo III had been forced to give the Lordship of Gibelet to Saladin in 1187 after being captured by him at the battle of Hattin. Through his mother Stephanie, Guido thus took part in the Crusade of 1197 to retake Gibelet.

In 1217, Guido fought alongside Leopold VI, Duke of Austria in the Fifth Crusade and in 1218–1219 he joined the Siege of Damietta in Egypt. He came into conflict with the Ibelin family and thus supported Frederick II in his Sixth Crusade. In August 1228, he took part in the conquest of Nicosia on Cyprus alongside Balian of Sidon. The last document referring to him dates to September 1238. He was succeeded after his death by his eldest son Henry.

== Marriage and issue ==
In 1204, he married Alice (c. 1185 – after 1204), daughter of Bohemond III of Antioch and his third wife. They had five children:

1. Maria (born before October 1214)
2. Henry I (born after 1214; died before 1271), Lord of Gibelet
3. Raymond (died after 1238), Chamberlain of Antioch
4. Bertrand (died after 1271)
5. Agnes, married Bartholomew of Saint Simeon, Lord of Soudin

== Sources ==
- Guido I Embriaco at manfred-hiebl.de.
