= Sacro Catino =

Artifact preserved in Genoa

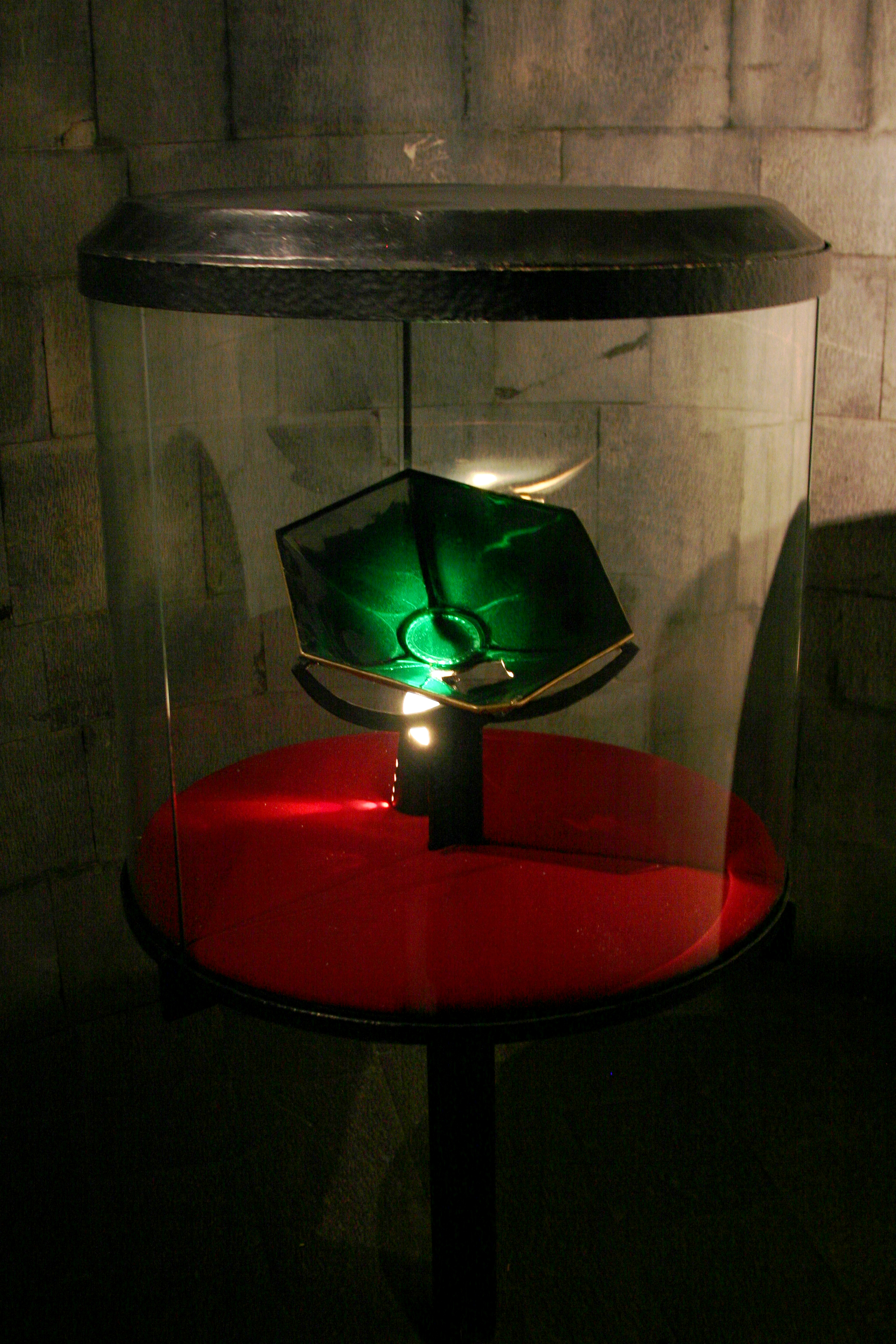
The Sacred Basin

The Sacro Catino is an artifact preserved in Genoa in the Museum of the Treasure of the Cathedral of San Lorenzo. It was portrayed as the Holy Grail, or the simulacrum of the dish used by Jesus Christ during the Last Supper; however modern studies considered it to be an Islamic artifact of the 9th-10th century.

== The item ==
The basin is a hexagonal vase made of bright green transparent material. When it was brought to Genoa it was believed that it was emerald. The Sacro Catino ended up shattered during its stay in France and was the subject of various restorations. The first in 1908, in 1951, and finally in 2017.

The study of the object made during the period of presence in France by the Académie des sciences of the Institut de France established that it was a Byzantine crystal and not an emerald. The following studies would have postdated the work considering it to be an Islamic artifact of the 9th - 10th century.

== Between history and legend ==
The source of the belief that the plate was the Holy Grail, is Jacopo da Varagine, who tells in the Genoese Chronicle that, during the first Crusade (11th century), the Genoese soldiers under the command of Guglielmo Embriaco participated in the capture of the city of Cesarea (1101), coming into possession of what was believed to be the dish of Jesus' Last Supper.

Archbishop William of Tyre wrote in the second half of the 12th century that the crusaders found the emerald plate in a temple built by Herod the Great and bought it at a high price. They resold it at a high price anyway.

At the beginning of the fourteenth century, Cardinal Luca Fieschi obtained the Catino as a pledge of the loan of 9,500 lire made by him to the Compagna Comunis who in 1327 redeemed the Catino and established that in the future it could no longer be committed or taken out of the sacristy of the cathedral.

Jean Le Meingre known as Boucicault, French governor of Genoa, in 1409 would have attempted the theft. In 1470 Anselmo Adorno describes it with precision, even if he later confuses it with the plate in which the Baptist's head had been placed, also preserved in San Lorenzo.

At the end of the fifteenth century the rumor spread that Venice too was attempting the subtraction. In 1522 the army of Emperor Charles V sacked Genoa, but failed to take possession of the treasure of the Cathedral both due to the resistance of the priests and because the Republic of Genoa paid 1,000 ducats to the captain who was besieging the sacristy.

In 1726 Gaetano di Santa Teresa says it is eight Genoese inches (16 cm ) high while the one on display today is only 9 cm high. This made someone think that to prevent the theft a copy would have been made with different sizes.

When Genoa was conquered by the French led by Napoleon Bonaparte, the dish was brought to Paris in 1806 and, when it was returned on June 14, 1816, it returned to Genoa broken into 10 pieces, one of which was missing.

In 2017, the "emerald vase" was returned to the city in its transparent color, after the restoration carried out by the Opificio delle Pietre Dure in Florence. According to L. Ciatti, protagonist of the restoration attributed to Daniele Angellotto. In 1800, the hypothesis was advanced for the first time that it was not obtained from a huge natural emerald, but that it was a simple green glass vase, a matter with no economic value.

== Bibliography ==
- Daniele Calcagno, The mystery of the "Sacro Catino", ed. Ecig, 2000.
- Fra Agostino Schiaffino, Ecclesiastical Annals of Liguria by the Reverend Father Fra Agostino Schiaffino Genovese, Volume II, f. 174. ("... in this city [Caesarea in a Meschita [mosque] which was already a Temple built by Herod in honor of Augustus Caesar, a green vase was found, made in the likeness of a cattino, who touched by lot to Genovesi for a very large sum of money, because they gave themselves to believe that it was emerald, so they brought it to the City for one of its [?] adornments, and they show it until today, as if by miracle to characters who pass by, convinced that that color is truly emerald ")]
- Fra Gaetano da S. Teresa, The eastern emerald basin, a gem consecrated by Our Lady Jesus Christ in the last supper of the azimi, and guarded with religious piety by the Ser.ma Rep.ca of Genoa, as a glorious trophy brought back in the conquest of the holy land. 'year 1101, in the Giovanni Franchelli printing house, Genoa 1726.

== See also ==
- Crusade
- Grail
- Guglielmo Embriaco
