= Giusto di Alemagna =

German painter

Joos Amann von Ravensburg (in Italian Giusto di Alemagna, or Justus d'Alemanno), a German painter, who practised at Genoa in the 15th century. He painted in fresco an Annunciation in a cloister of Santa Maria di Castello, in 1451; Lanzi considers it a precious picture of its sort, finished in the manner of the miniaturists, and apparently the precursor of the style of Albrecht Dürer. Justus d'Alemanno is not the same as Justus of Ghent, as some writers have supposed.

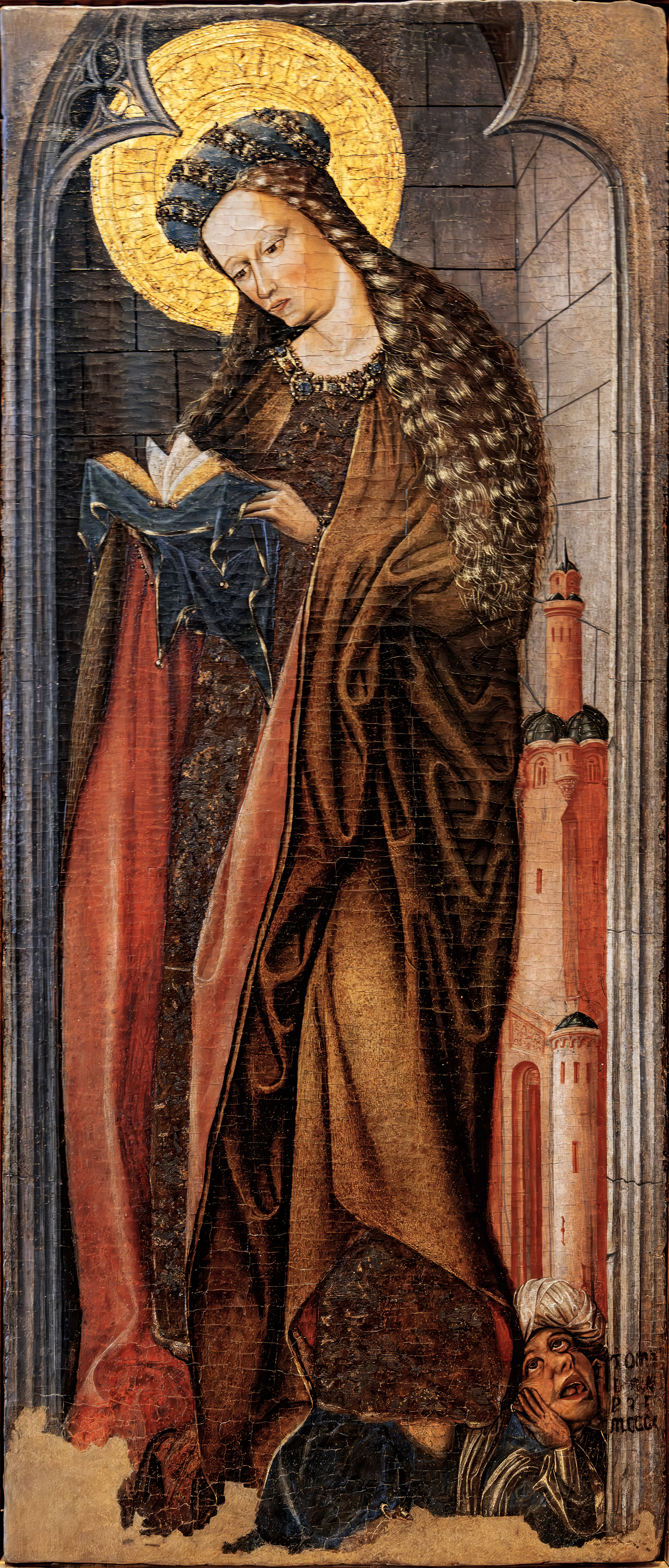
Santa Barbara Correr Museum

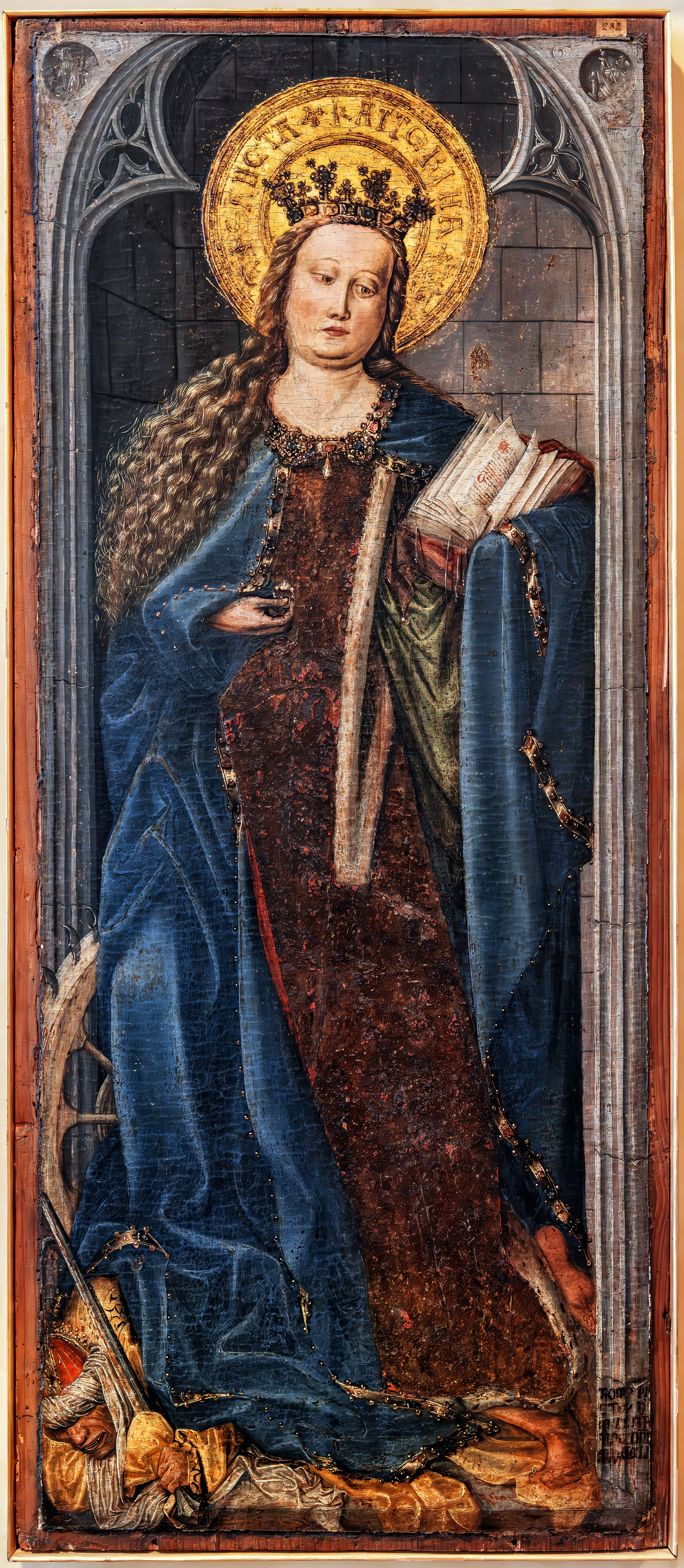
Santa Caterina Correr Museum

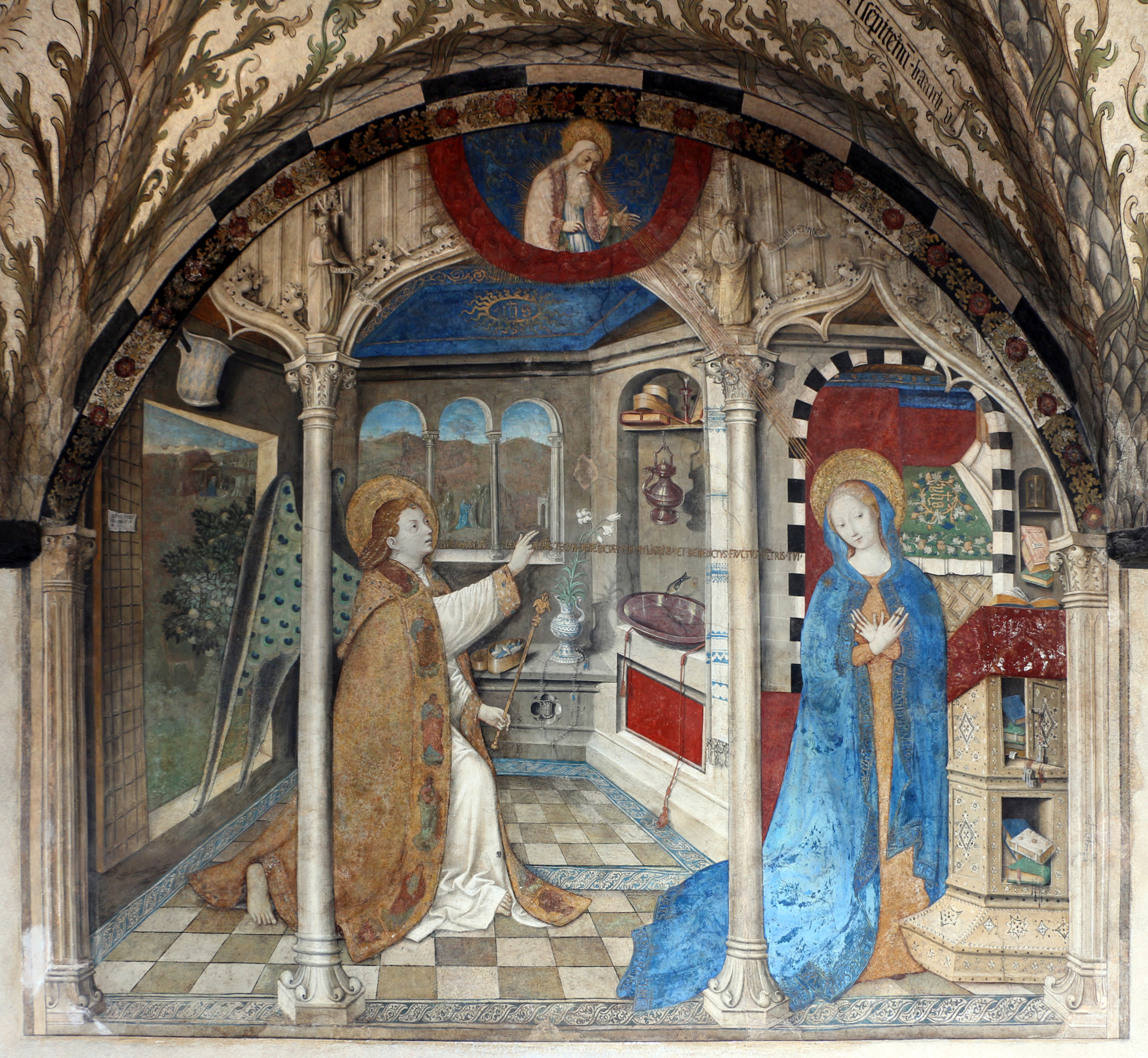
Annunciation by Giusto di Alemagna
