= Thierry de Termonde =

Thierry of Termonde (also Terremonde or Tenremonde, died in 1206 in Rusion) was lord of Adelon for marriage in the Kingdom of Jerusalem, and constable of Latin Empire of Constantinople.

He was the youngest son of Gautier II de Termonde, Lord of Termonde (Flemish: Dendermonde) in Flanders.

He was probably as Thierry d'Orca and Aymar de Lairon one of the Crusaders who remained in the Holy Land after the end of the Third Crusade. In 1204 came from the Holy Land and was with Hugh II of Saint Omer and his brother Ralph with a contingent of troops to Constantinople, where his compatriot Baldwin of Flanders, had just been crowned after the Fourth Crusade Emperor of the Latin Empire. Baldwin there named Thierry as constable. According to Geoffrey of Villehardouin Thierry died in the spring of 1206 at the Battle of Rusion (also Roussillon or Rusium) in Thrace fighting against Bulgarians.

== Sources ==
- du Fresne, Charles (1971) [1869]. Nicolas Rodolphe Taranne; Emmanuel Guillaume-Rey (eds.). Les familles d'outre-mer (in French). New York: Neuauflage, Burst-Franklin. ISBN 0-833-70932-1.
