= Peter Embriaco =

Peter Embriaco of Gibelet, lord of the fief of Gibelet (modern Byblos), was the last prince of the House of Giblet (Embriaco family) in the Levant.

== Biography ==
He became the Lord of Gibelet, following the death of his father Guido II Embriaco. However, the town was occupied by Bohemond VII, Count of Tripoli. Following the victory of the Mamluk sultan Qalawun and his capture of Tripoli and the neighbouring cities of Le Boutron and Nefin, Peter managed to keep his lands around Gibelet in exchange for the payment of a tribute to the Sultan. He lost his territories in 1300 and left to Cyprus.

He married Douce de Gaurelée, then Agnes Embriaco of Gibelet.
