= Byblos (disambiguation) =

Byblos is the largest city in the Mount Lebanon Governorate of Lebanon.

Byblos may also refer to:

- Byblos Bank, Byblos, Lebanon
- Byblos Castle, Byblos, Lebanon
- Byblos Club, a multi sports club based in Byblos, Lebanon
- Byblos Port, Byblos, Lebanon
- Byblos syllabary, an undeciphered writing system

== See also ==
- Byblos script (disambiguation)
