= Byblos =

Byblos جُبَيْل Jebeil
- City
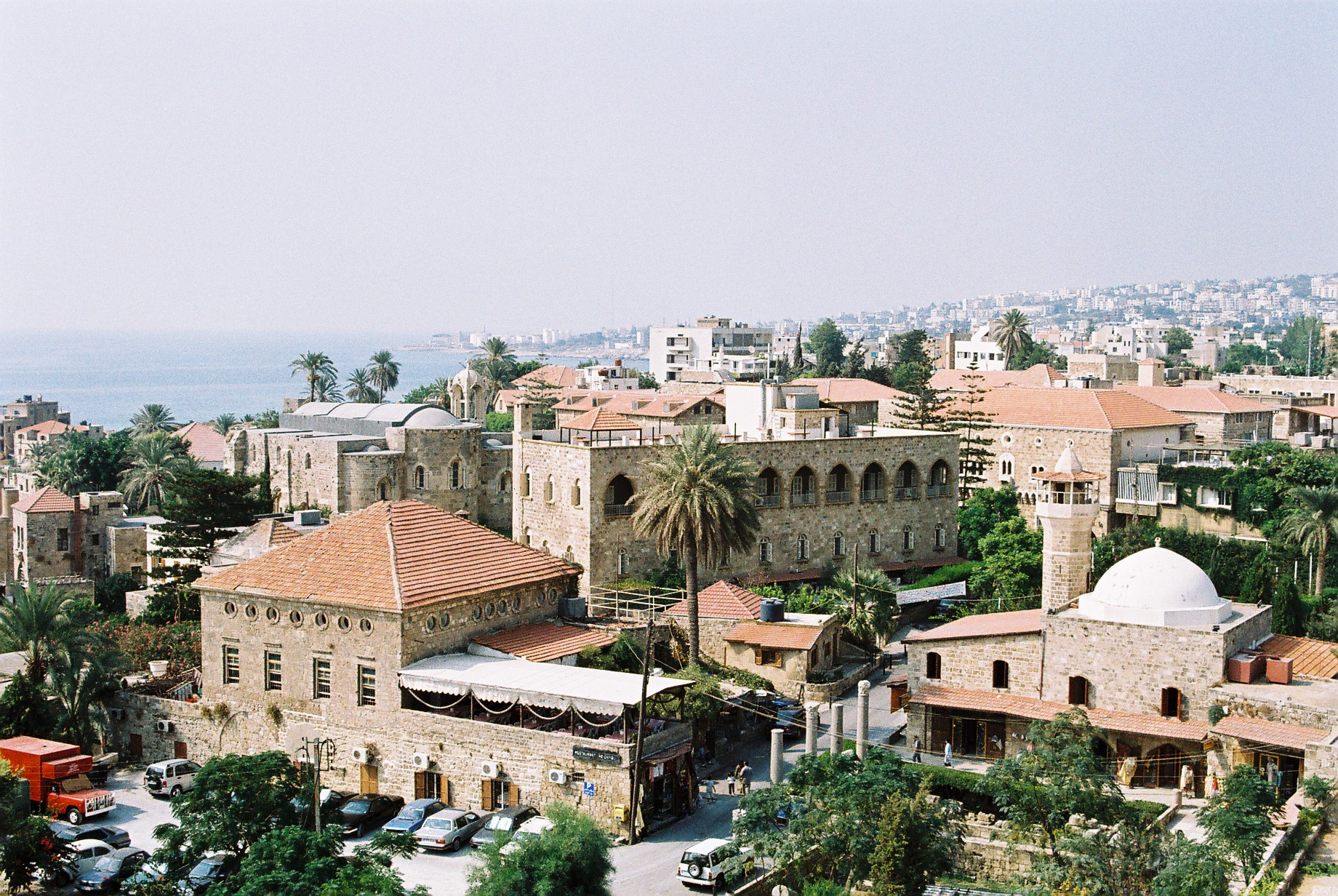
- Byblos Old Town

- Location within Lebanon Byblos (Middle East)
- Coordinates: 34°07′25″N 35°39′07″E
- Country: Lebanon
- Governorate: Keserwan-Jbeil
- District: Byblos

Area
  - City: 4.16 km^{2} (1.61 sq mi)
  - Metro: 17 km^{2} (6.6 sq mi)

Population
  - City: 40,000
  - Metro: 100,000
- Time zone: UTC+2 (EET)
  - Summer (DST): UTC+3 (EEST)
- Dialing code: +961
- Website: www.jbail-byblos.gov.lb

UNESCO World Heritage Site
- Criteria: Cultural: iii, iv, vi
- Reference: 295
- Inscription: 1984 (8th Session)

Byblos (/ˈbɪblɒs/ BIB-loss; Ancient Greek: Βύβλος), also known as Jbail, Jebeil, Jbeil or Jubayl (Arabic: جُبَيْل, romanized: Jubayl, locally Jbeil [ʒ(ə)beːl]), is an ancient city in the Keserwan-Jbeil Governorate of Lebanon. The area is believed to have been first settled between 8800 and 7000 BC and continuously inhabited since 5000 BC. During its history, Byblos was invaded by numerous peoples including Egyptian, Assyrian, Persian, Hellenistic, Roman, Umayyad, Abbasid, Genoese, Ayyubid, Mamluk and Ottoman forces. Urbanization is thought to have begun during the third millennium BC when it developed into a city, making it one of the oldest cities in the world, if not the oldest. It is a UNESCO World Heritage Site.

== Etymology ==
R5 N35 Z4 N25
kbnj
in hieroglyphs
Era: 1st Intermediate Period
(2181–2055 BC)

V31 D58 N35 N25
kbn
in hieroglyphs
Era: Middle Kingdom
(2055–1650 BC)

The name appears as kbnj in Egyptian hieroglyphic records going back to the 4th-dynasty pharaoh Sneferu (fl. 2600 BC) and as Gubla (𒁺𒆷) in the Akkadian cuneiform Amarna letters to the 18th-dynasty pharaohs Amenhotep III and IV. In the 1st millennium BC, its name appeared in Phoenician and Punic inscriptions as Gebal (𐤂𐤁𐤋, gbl); in the Hebrew Bible as Geval (גבל); and in Syriac as gbl (ܓܒܠ). Eusebius' Onomasticon stated that Byblos was called "Gobel / Gebal" in Hebrew. The name seems to derive from gb (𐤂𐤁, "well") and ʾl (𐤀𐤋, "god"), the latter a word that could variously refer to any of the Canaanite gods or to their leader in particular. The name thus seems to have meant the "Well of the God" or "Source of the God".

Its present Arabic name Jubayl (جبيل) or J(e)beil is a direct descendant of these earlier names, although apparently modified by a misunderstanding of the name as the triliteral root gbl or jbl, meaning "mountain". When the Arabic form of the name is used, it is typically rendered Jbeil, Jbail, or Jbayl in English. All of these, along with Byblos, are etymologically related. During the Crusades, this name appeared in Western records as Gibelet or Giblet. This name was used for Byblos Castle and its associated lordship.

The Phoenician City, known to the Greeks as Býblos (Βύβλος) and to the Romans as Byblus, was important for their import of papyrus out of Ancient Egypt – to the extent that "byblos" came to mean "papyrus" in Greek. The English word "Bible" ultimately derives from the Greek name of the city, Βύβλος ('Βύblos / Byblos').

== History and archaeology ==
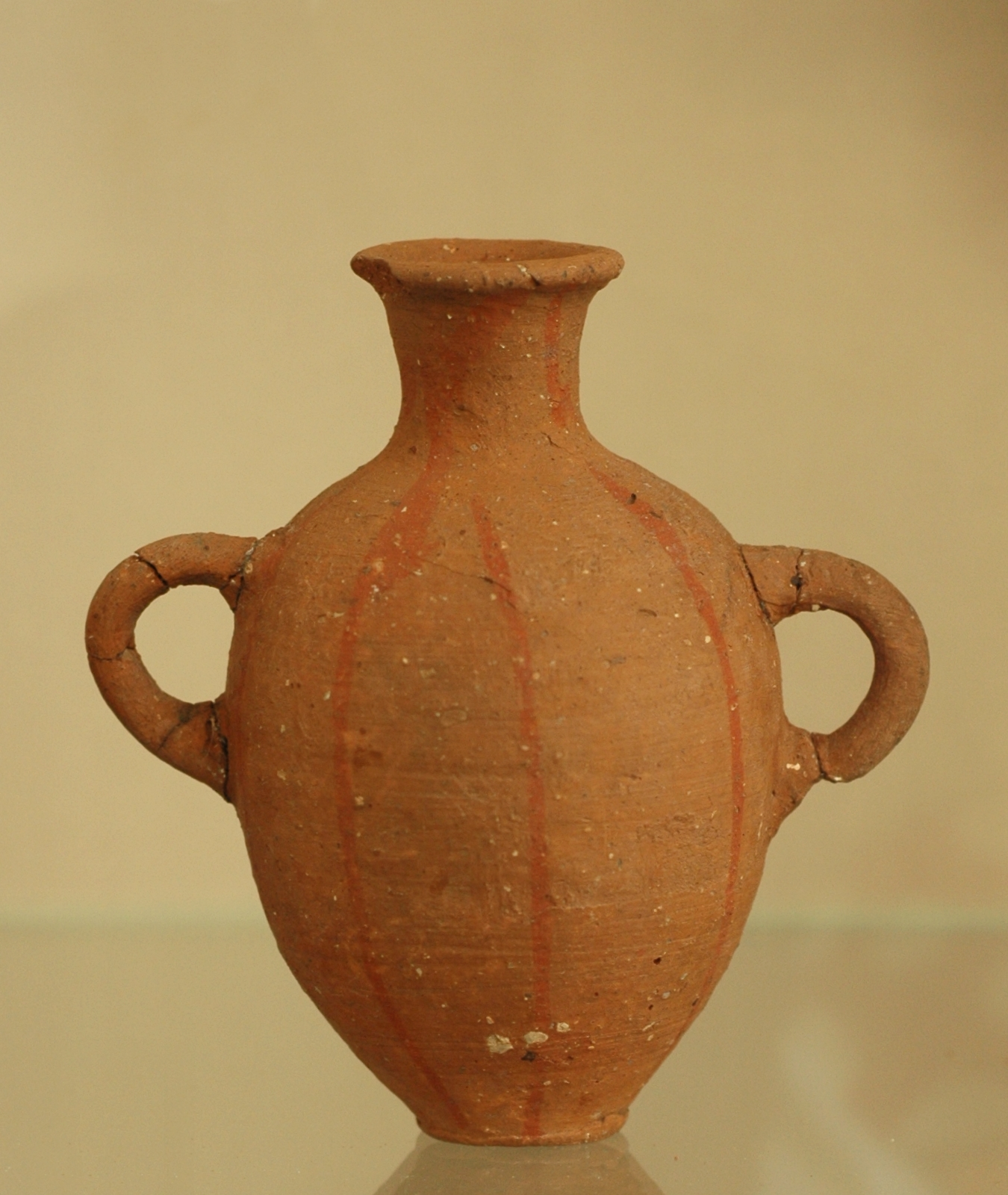
Terracotta jug from Byblos (now in the Louvre), Late Bronze Age (1600–1200 BC)

Situated approximately 42 km (26 mi) north of Beirut, Byblos holds a strong allure for archaeologists due to its accumulations of various strata resulting from countless centuries of human dwelling. The initial excavation was conducted by Ernest Renan in 1860, documented in his work "Mission de Phénicie" (1865–1874). This was succeeded by Pierre Montet's efforts from 1921 to 1924, and later by Maurice Dunand, who continued excavations from 1925 for a span of forty years. Renan's expedition was to "provide the evidence that the city did not move and that Gebeil is Byblos".

Fragments attributed to the semi-legendary pre-Homeric Phoenician priest Sanchuniathon say Byblos was the first city erected in Phoenicia and was established by the god Cronus. (Cronus was considered the nearest equivalent to the Canaanite Baal / Baal Hammon in the syncretising system used by the ancient Greeks and Romans.) According to the writer Philo of Byblos (quoting Sanchuniathon, and quoted in Eusebius), Byblos was founded by the Phoenician shrine god El (whom the Greeks identified with their god Cronus). During the 3rd millennium BC, the first signs of a town can be observed, with the remains of well-built houses of uniform size. This was the period when the Canaanite civilization began to develop.

=== Neolithic and Chalcolithic levels ===
Neolithic remains of some buildings can be observed at the site. Jacques Cauvin published studies of flint tools from the stratified Neolithic and Chalcolithic sites in 1962. Remains of humans found in Chalcolithic burials have been published by Henri Victor Vallois in 1937. Tombs from this era were discussed by Emir Maurice Chehab in 1950. Early pottery found at the tell was published by E.S. Boynton in 1960 with further studies by R. Erich in 1954 and Van Liere and Henri de Contenson in 1964.

==== Dunand's five-level stratigraphy ====
Prehistoric settlements at Byblos were divided up by Dunand into the following five periods, which were recently expanded and re-calibrated by Yosef Garfinkel to correlate with Tell es-Sultan (Jericho):

- Early Neolithic (early phase) corresponding to the Pre-Pottery Neolithic B (PPNB) of Jericho, represented by plastered floors and naviforme technology, dated between 8800 and 7000 BC;
- Early Neolithic (late phase) corresponding to the PNA of Tell es-Sultan (Jericho) IX (also Yarmukian) between 6400 and 5800 BC, represented by pottery, sickle blades, figurines and small points;
- Middle Neolithic corresponding to the PNB of Tell es-Sultan (Jericho) VIII and represented by pottery, dated between 5800 and 5300 BC;
- Late Neolithic corresponding to the Middle Chalcolithic of Beth Shean and represented by pottery, stone vessels, silos, chamber tombs and seals, dated between 5300 and 4500 BC;
- Early Chalcolithic corresponding to the Late Chalcolithic of Ghassulian, represented by jar burials, pierced flint, churn and a violin figurine, dated to between 4500 and 3600 BC and,
- Late Chalcolithic corresponding to the Early Bronze Age, represented by architecture and cylinder seal impressions, dated to between 3600 and 3100 BC.

The site first appears to have been settled during the Pre-Pottery Neolithic B period, approximately 8800 to 7000 BC (Durand's Early Neolithic).

Early Neolithic Byblos was a later settlement than others in the Beqaa Valley such as Labweh and Ard Tlaili. It was located on the seaward slope of the larger of the two hills that used to compose ancient Byblos, with a watered valley in between.

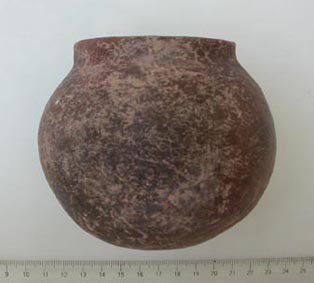
Dark faced burnished ware pottery from Shir, in Syria

The original site spread down into the valley and covered an area of 1.2 ha (3.0 acres) providing fertile soils and a protected landing place for boats. Dunand discovered around twenty houses although some of the settlement was suggested to have been lost to the sea, robbed or destroyed. Dwellings were rectangular with plastered floors, pottery was usually Dark faced burnished ware with some shell impressions.

The Middle Neolithic was a smaller settlement of no more than 0.15 ha (0.37 acres) adjacent to the older site. The pottery was more developed with red washes and more varied forms and elaborate decorations, buildings were poorer with unplastered floors.

The Late Neolithic period showed development from the middle in building design, a wider range of more developed flint tools and a far larger variety of pottery with fabrication including silica. The Late Chalcolithic featured developments of "Canaanite blades" and fan scrapers. Adult burials in jars started to appear along with metal in the form of one copper hook, found in a jar. Some jars were lined with white plaster that was applied and self-hardened after firing. Copper appeared more frequently in the Late Chalcolithic period along with multiple burials in tombs and jar handles with impressed signs.

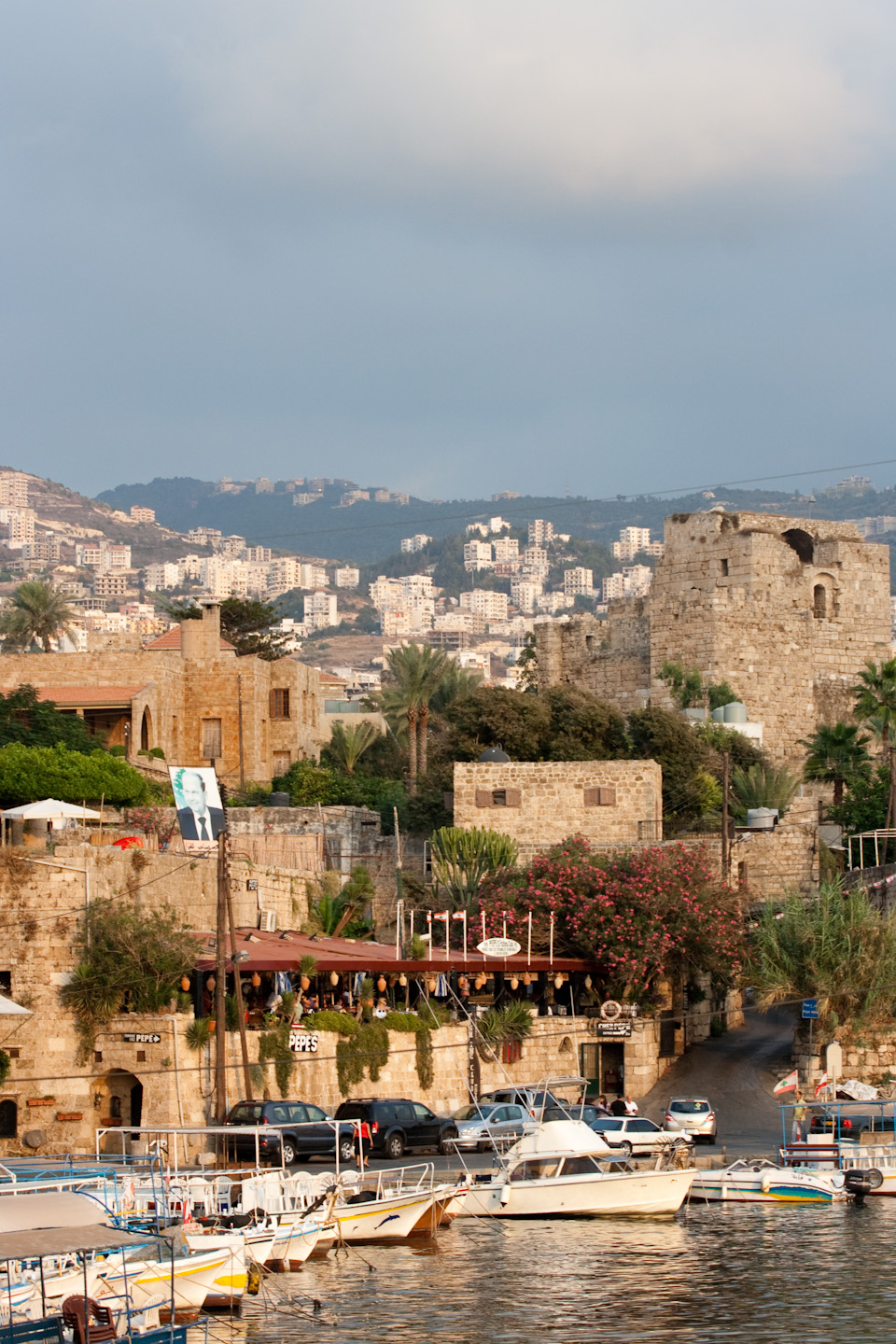
Byblos

=== Early Bronze Age ===
According to Lorenzo Nigro, Byblos moved from being a fishermen's village to its earlier urban form at the beginning of the third millennium BC. Early Bronze Age remains were characterised by the development of Byblos combed ware and a lithic assemblage studied by Jacques Cauvin.

Watson Mills and Roger Bullard suggest that during the Old Kingdom of Egypt and Middle Kingdom of Egypt Byblos was virtually an Egyptian colony. The growing city was a wealthy one and seems to have been an ally (among "those who are on his waters") of Egypt for many centuries. First Dynasty tombs used timbers from Byblos. One of the oldest Egyptian words for an oceangoing boat was "Byblos ship". Archaeologists have recovered Egyptian-made artifacts as old as a vessel fragment bearing the name of the Second dynasty ruler Khasekhemwy, although this "may easily have reached Byblos through trade and/or at a later period".

- EB IA (3600-3300 BCE): Rural/fisherman's village (Dunand Installation IIb from Chalcolithic to EB IA) with a shrine erected at the natural spring. The spring was gradually built up as a sacred well.
- EB IB (3300-3000 BCE): Proto-urban town with a temple compound. (Dunand Installation III).

=== Middle Bronze Age ===
In the Middle Bronze IIA, objects have been found at Byblos naming the 12th Dynasty king Senusret II, the 13th Dynasty Egyptian king Neferhotep I.

=== Late Bronze Age ===
During the Late Bronze Age, the rulers of Byblos maintained close relationships with the New Kingdom pharaohs of Ancient Egypt.

==== Amarna period ====
Around 1350 BC, the Amarna letters include 60 letters from Rib-Hadda and his successor Ili-Rapih who were rulers of Byblos, writing to the Egyptian government. This is mainly due to Rib-Hadda's constant pleas for military assistance from Akhenaten. They also deal with the conquest of neighbouring city-states by the Habiru.

==== Ramesside period ====
It appears Egyptian contact peaked during the 19th dynasty, only to decline during the 20th and 21st dynasties. In addition, when the New Kingdom collapsed in the 11th century BC, Byblos ceased being a colony and became the foremost city of Phoenicia. Although the archaeological evidence seems to indicate a brief resurgence during the 22nd and 23rd dynasties, it is clear after the Third Intermediate Period the Egyptians started favouring Tyre and Sidon instead of Byblos.

=== Iron Age ===
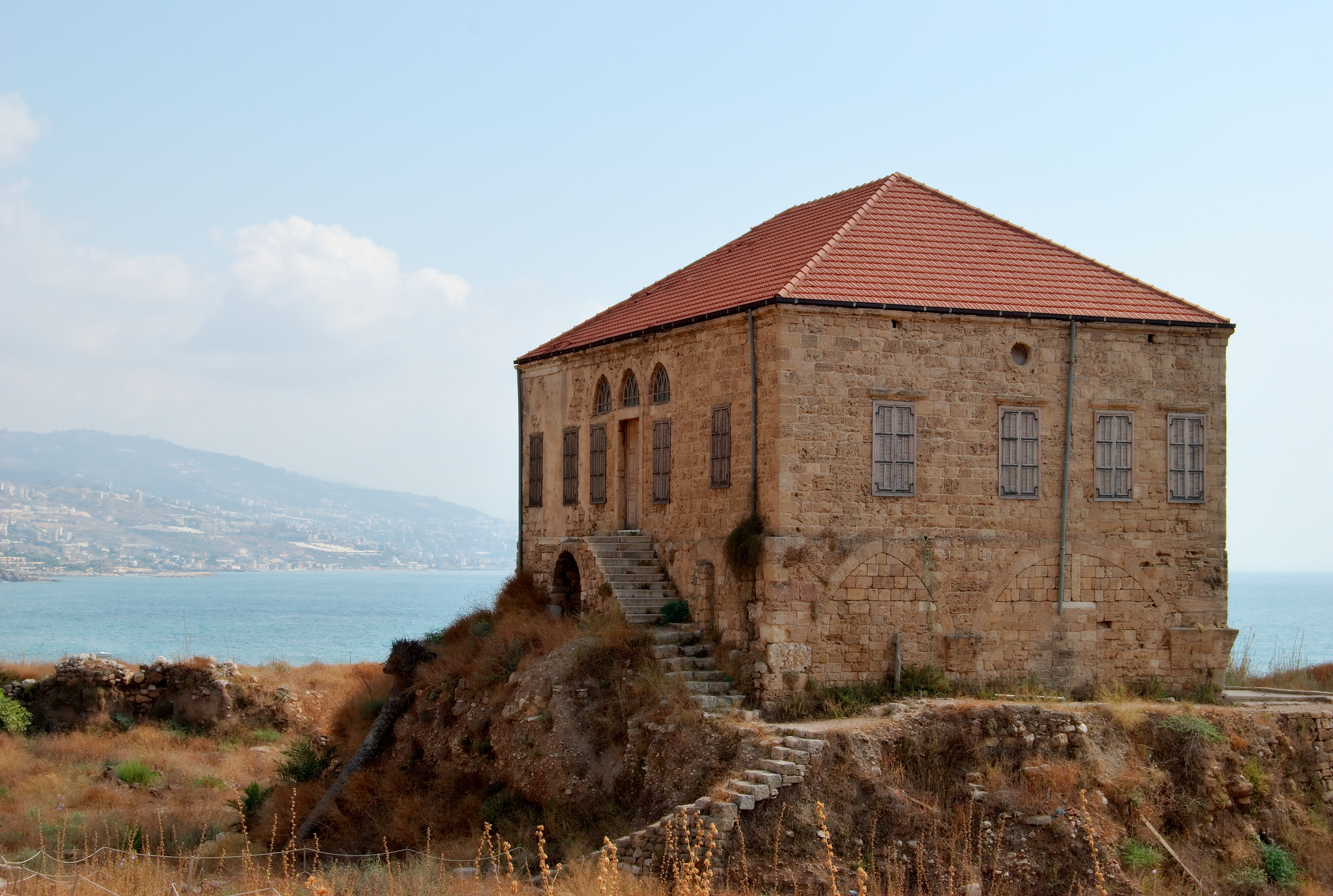
Traditional Lebanese house overlooking the Mediterranean sea, Byblos. This house is within the antiquities complex and illustrates the modern ground level concerning excavations

==== Phoenician period ====
Archaeological evidence at Byblos, particularly the five Byblian royal inscriptions dating back to around 1150–950 BC, shows existence of a Phoenician alphabet of twenty-two characters; an important example is the Ahiram sarcophagus. The use of the alphabet was spread by Phoenician merchants through their maritime trade into parts of North Africa and Europe. One of the most important monuments of this period is the Temple of the Obelisks, dedicated to the Canaanite war god Resheph, but this had fallen into ruins by the time of Alexander the Great.

==== Assyrian period ====
In the Assyrian period, Sibittibaal of Byblos became tributary to Tiglath-Pileser III in 738 BC, and in 701 BC, when Sennacherib conquered all Phoenicia, the king of Byblos was Urumilki. Byblos was also subject to Assyrian kings Esarhaddon (r. 681–669 BC) and Ashurbanipal (r. 668–627 BC), under its kings Milkiasaph and Yehawmelek.

==== Persian period ====
In the Achaemenid Empire (538–332 BC), Byblos was the fourth of four Phoenician vassal kingdoms established by the Persians; the first three being Sidon, Tyr, and Arwad.

=== Classical antiquity ===
Hellenistic rule came with the arrival of Alexander the Great in the area in 332 BC. Coinage was in use, and there is abundant evidence of continued trade with other Mediterranean countries.

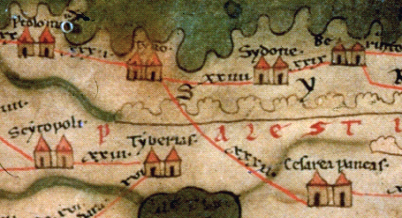
Phoenicia in late antiquity, from the Peutinger map

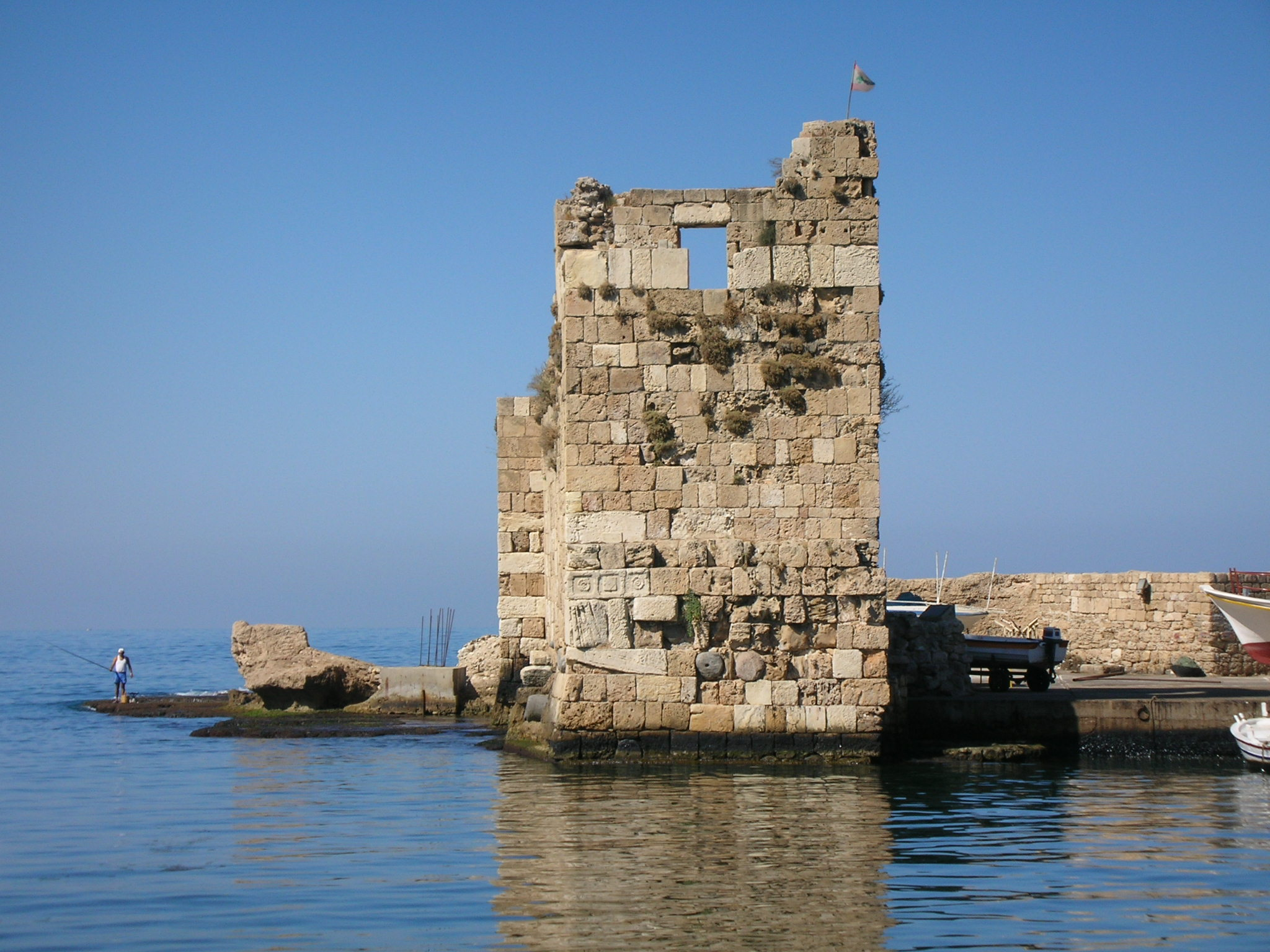
Ruins at port.

During the Greco-Roman period, the temple of Resheph was elaborately rebuilt, and the city, though smaller than its neighbours such as Tyrus and Zidonia, was a centre for the cult of Adonis.

King Herod of Judaea, known for his extensive building projects, including beyond his own kingdom, constructed a city wall for Byblos.

In the 3rd century, a small but impressive theatre was constructed. With the rise of Christianity, a bishopric was established in Byblos, and the town grew rapidly. Although a Sasanian colony is known to have been established in the region following the early Muslim conquests of 636, there is little archaeological evidence for it. Trade with Europe effectively dried up, and it was not until the coming of the First Crusade in 1098 that prosperity returned to Byblos, known then as Gibelet or Giblet.

=== Crusader, Mamluk, Ottoman period ===
Crusader Fort

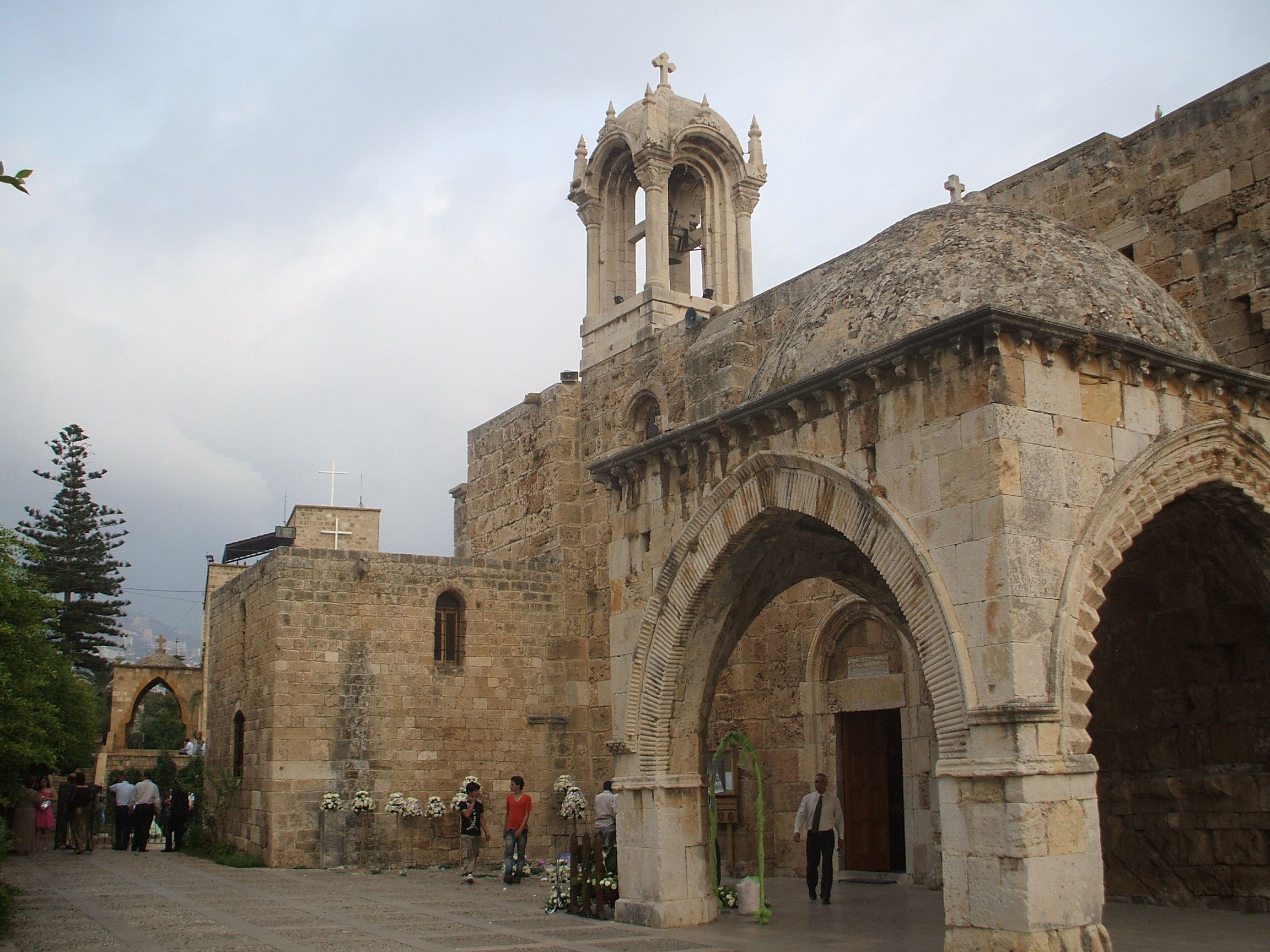
The Crusades-era Church of St. John-Mark in Byblos

In the 12th and 13th century, Byblos became part of the County of Tripoli, a Crusader state connected to, but largely independent from, the Crusader Kingdom of Jerusalem.

As Gibelet or Giblet, it came under the rule of the Genoese Embriaco family, who created for themselves the Lordship of Gibeletto, first as administrators of the city in the name of the Republic of Genoa, and then as a hereditary fief, undertaking to pay an annual fee to Genoa and the church of San Lorenzo (Genoa's Cathedral).

The Embriaco family's residence, the Byblos Castle, along with the fortified town, served as an important military base for the Crusaders. The remains of the castle are among the most impressive architectural structures now visible in the town centre. The town was taken by Saladin in 1187, re-taken by the Crusaders, and conquered by Baibars in 1266, but it remained in the possession of the Embriacos until around 1300.

Having voluntarily surrendered to the Mamluks, the city was relatively spared from looting following its capture. Its fortifications were subsequently restored by Baybars. From 1516 until 1918, the town and the whole region became part of the Ottoman Empire.

=== Contemporary history ===
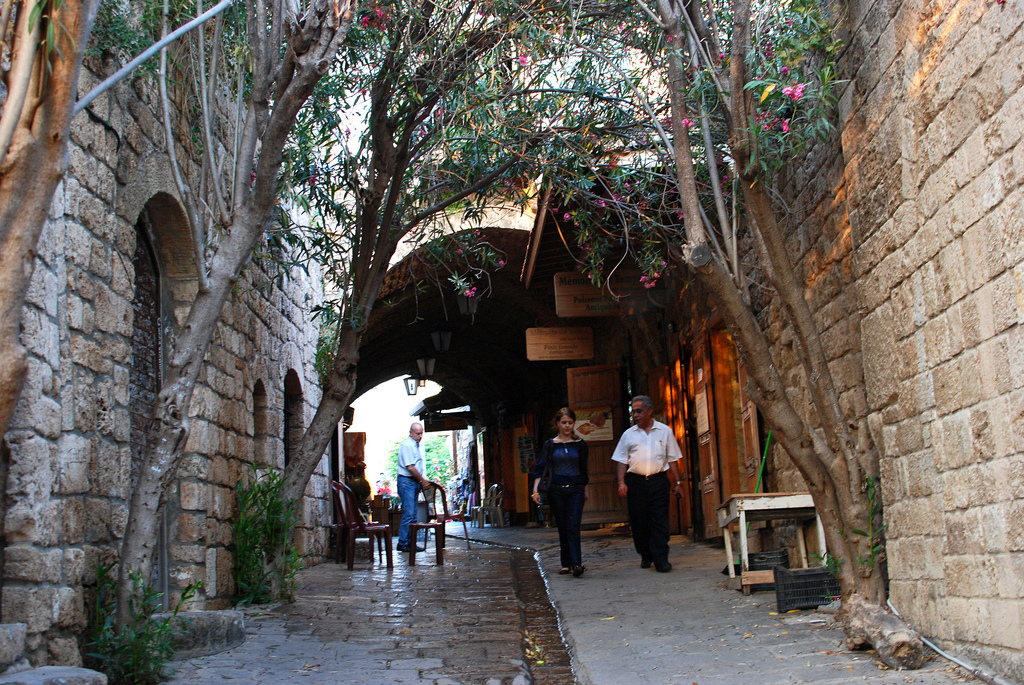
Byblos Historic Quarter

Byblos and all of Lebanon were placed under French Mandate from 1920 until 1943 when Lebanon achieved independence. The 2006 Lebanon War negatively affected the ancient city by covering its harbour and town walls with an oil slick that was the result of an oil spill from a nearby power plant.

During the 2024 Israeli invasion of Lebanon, UNESCO gave Byblos and 33 other cultural sites enhanced protection to safeguard them against damage. An exhibition of 400 artefacts, Byblos, Millennia-old City of Lebanon, from Byblos was held at the Institut du monde arabe in Paris in 2026.

== Demographics ==
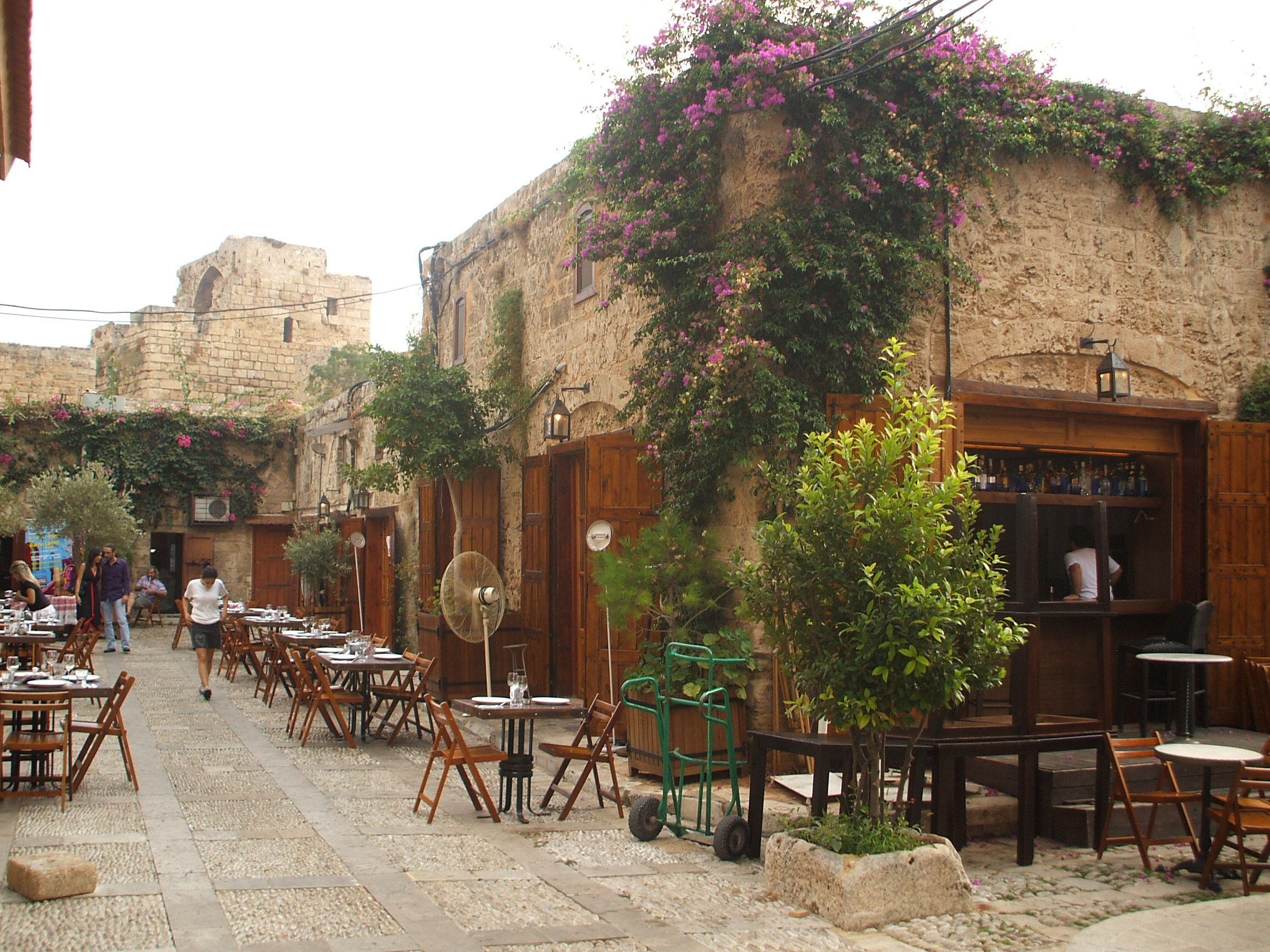
The old souk in Byblos, Lebanon

Byblos's inhabitants are significantly Christian, mostly Maronite, with minorities of Armenian Apostolic, Greek Orthodox, and Greek Catholics. There is also a minority of Shia and Sunni Muslims. It is said that the predominantly Shi`i city of Bint Jbeil ("Daughter of Byblos") in Southern Lebanon was founded by Shi`a migrants from Byblos. Byblos has three representatives in the Parliament of Lebanon: two Maronites and one Shi`i Muslim.

== Education ==
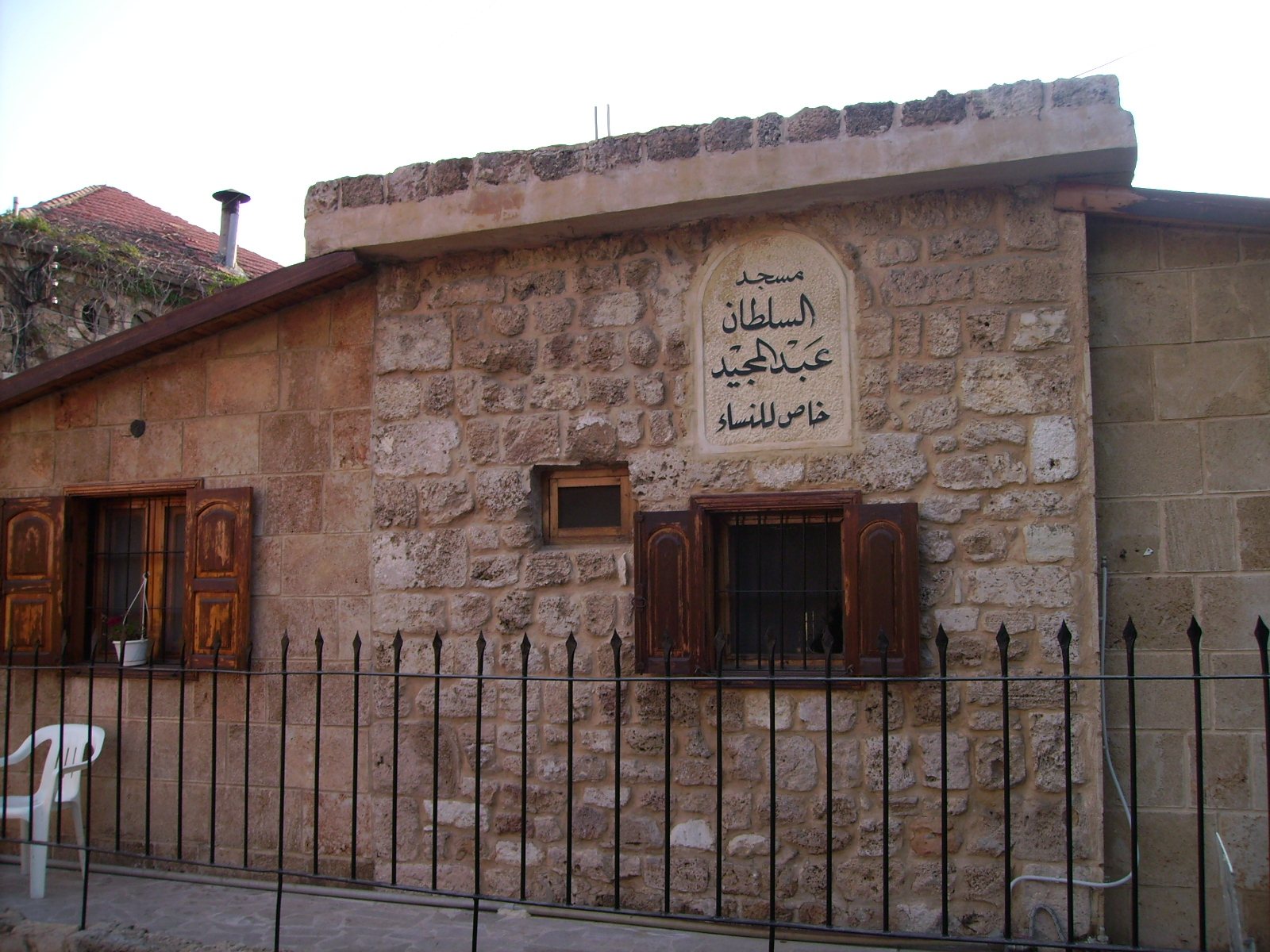
Sultan Abdulmejid mosque in Byblos, Lebanon

Byblos is home to the professional schools of the Lebanese American University (LAU). The LAU Byblos Campus houses the Medical School, the Engineering School, the School of Architecture and Design, the Pharmacy School, which offers the only Pharm.D. Program outside the United States accredited by the Accreditation Council for Pharmacy Education (ACPE), the School of Business, and the School of Arts and Sciences.

== Tourism ==
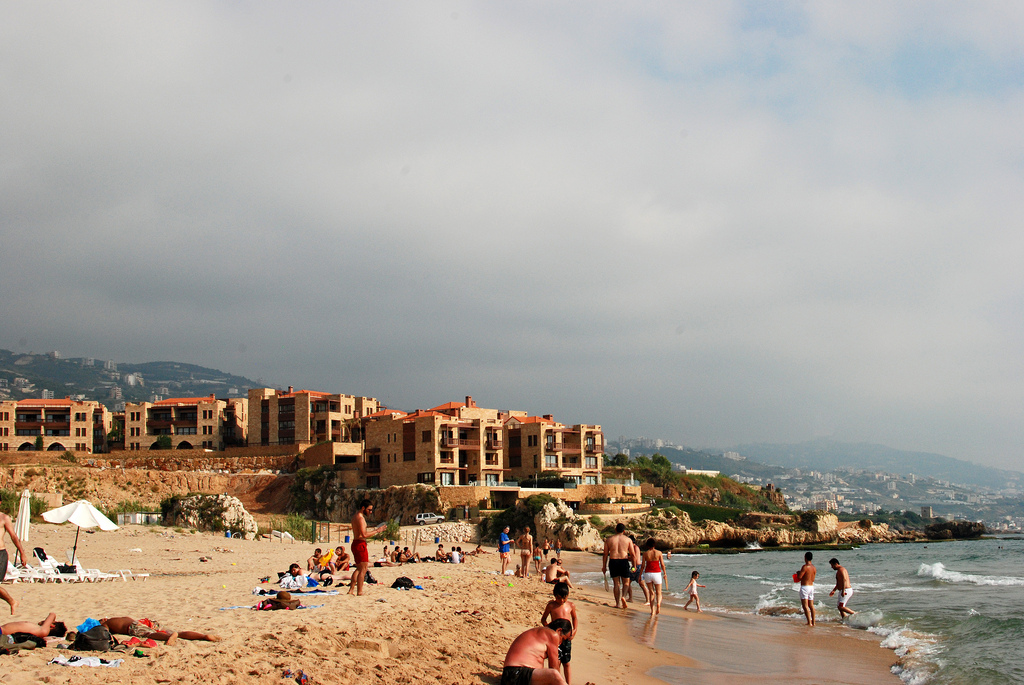
Byblos public beach

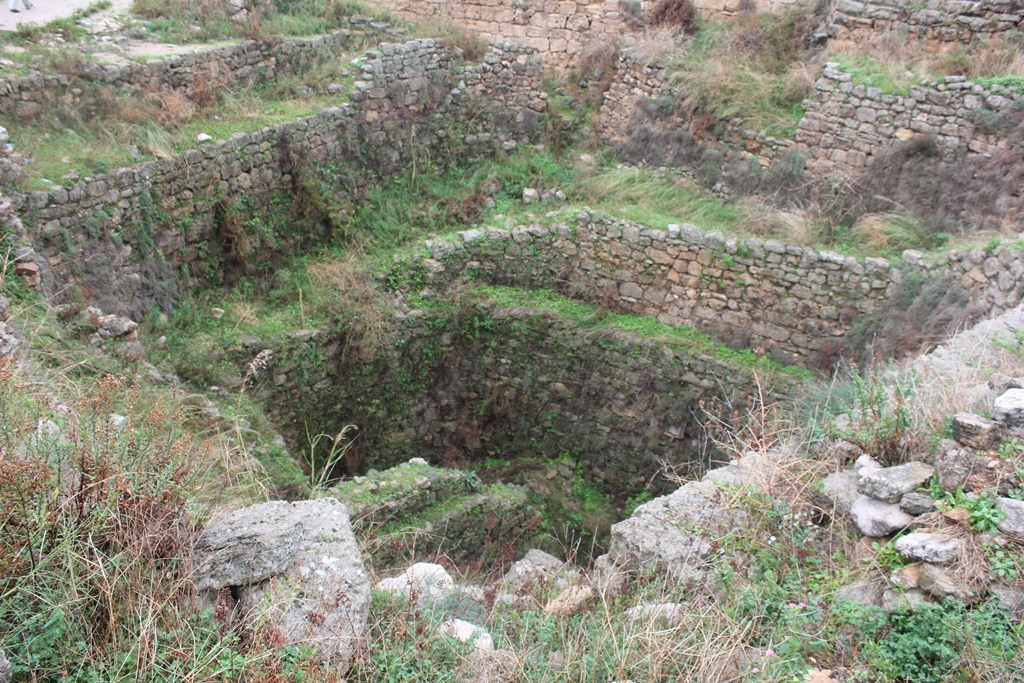
The King's Spring

Byblos is re-emerging as an upscale touristic hub. With its ancient port, Phoenician, Roman, and Crusader ruins, sandy beaches and the picturesque mountains that surround it make it an ideal tourist destination. The city is known for its fish restaurants, open-air bars, and outdoor cafes. Yachts cruise into its harbor today as they did in the 1960s and 1970s when Marlon Brando and Frank Sinatra were regular visitors to the city. Byblos was crowned as the "Arab Tour Capital" for the year 2016 by the Lebanese minister of tourism in the Grand Serail in Beirut. Byblos was chosen by Condé Nast Traveler as the second best city in the Middle East for 2012, beating Tel Aviv and Dubai, and by the World Tourism Organization as the best Arab tourist city for 2013.

== The Byblos archaeological site ==
- Ain el-Malik or King's Spring, about 20 m deep, is a large cavity accessible by spiral stairs. Once it supplied the city with water. According to Plutarch's version of the Egyptian Osiris myth, the king's servants met Isis on the stairs of the spring and took her to the royal palace, where she found the body of her husband Osiris embedded in one of the palace pillars.

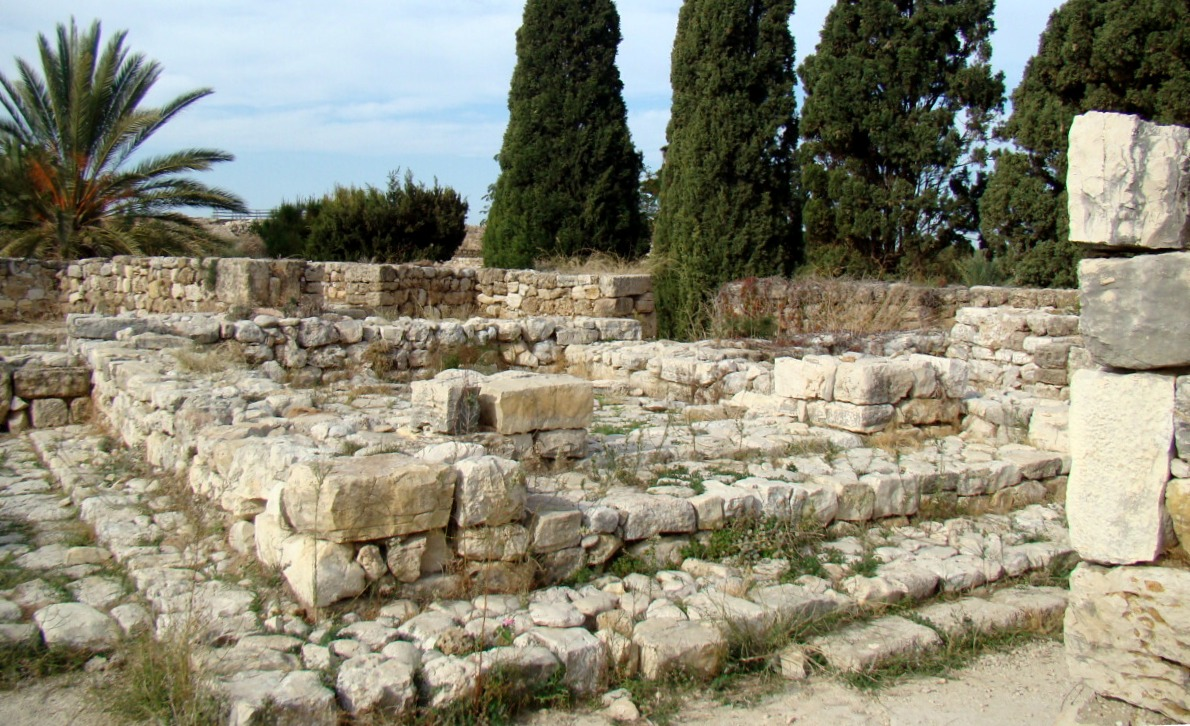
The L-shaped Temple

- The L-shaped Temple was erected about 2700 BC.

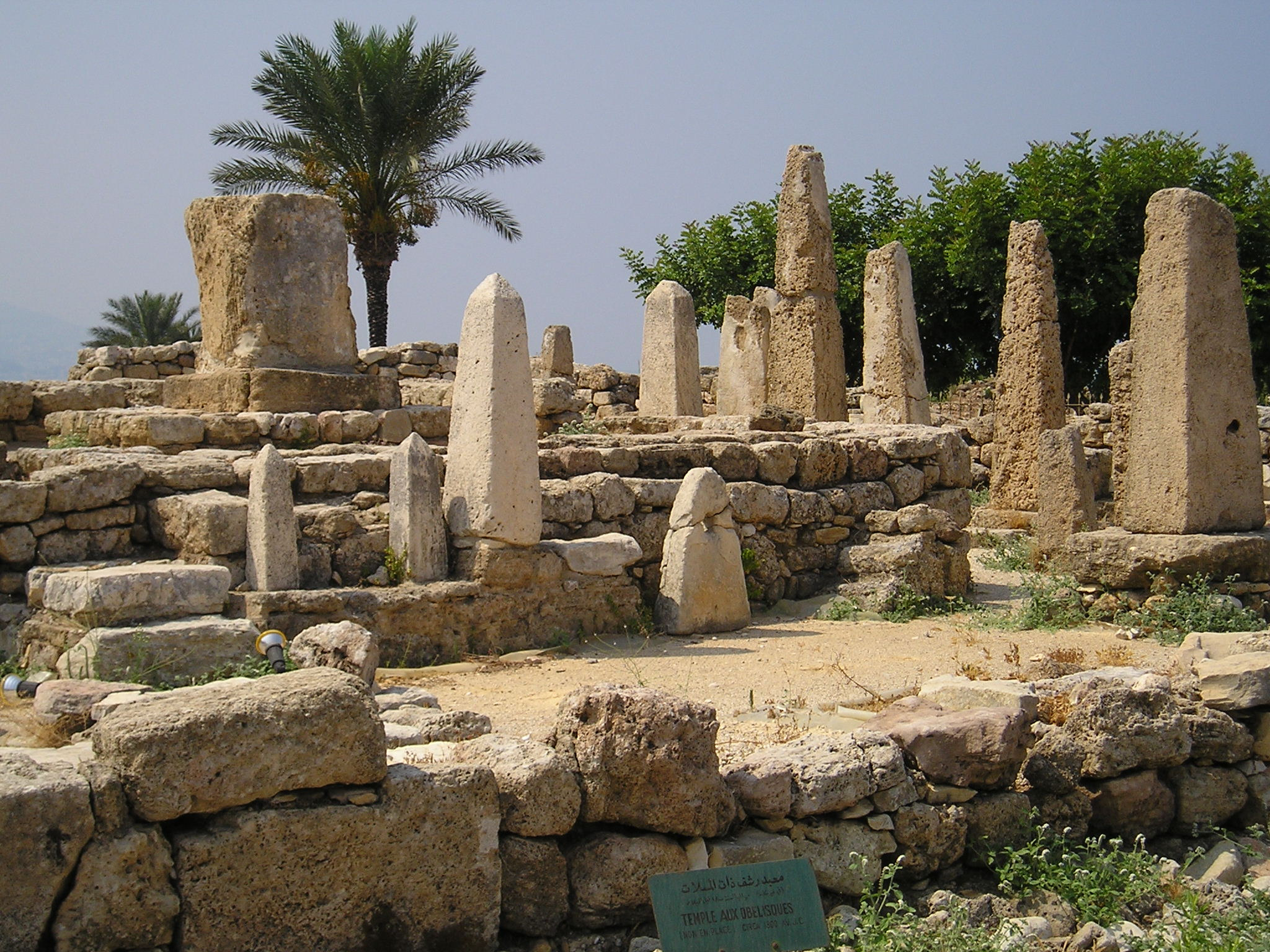
The Temple of the Obelisks

- The Temple of the Obelisks, originally built in 1600–1200 BC on top of the “L-shaped temple,” was moved by archaeologists to its present location. The many small obelisks found in this temple were used as religious offerings. The sanctuary contained a large number of human figurines made of bronze covered with gold leaf, which are now displayed in the National Museum of Beirut.
- The royal necropolis dates back to the second millennium BC and contains tombs of the Byblos kings, including King Ahiram.
- The Bronze Age necropolis of the Gebalite elite, discovered in 2019 at the southern outskirts of the ancient city acropolis.
- The Roman theater was built around AD 218.

== Other historic buildings ==
- Byblos Wax Museum

The Byblos Wax Museum displays wax statues of characters whose dates of origin range from Phoenician times to current days.

- Byblos Fossil Museum

The Byblos Fossil Museum has a collection of fossilised fish, sharks, eel, flying fish, and other marine life, some of which are millions of years old.

- Medieval city wall

The old medieval part of Byblos is surrounded by walls running about 270m from east to west and 200m from north to south.

- Byblos Castle

Byblos Castle was built by the Crusaders in the 12th century. It is located in the archaeological site near the port.

- St John the Baptist Church

Work on the church started during the Crusades in 1115. It was considered a cathedral and was partially destroyed during an earthquake in AD 1170. It was later given to the Maronite bishop as a gift by Prince Yusuf Shihab.

- Sultan Abduljid Mosque

The old mosque by the Castle dates back to the Mamluk period, and adopted the name of Sultan Abdulmejid I after he renovated it.

- Historic Quarter and Souks

In the southeast section of the historic city, near the entrance of the archaeological site, is an old market.

- Byblos International Festival

This summer music festival is an annual event that takes place in the historic quarter.

- Temple of Baalat Gebal
- Aram Bezikian Museum

The Armenian Genocide Orphans' Aram Bezikian Museum is a museum dedicated to preserving the memory of the Armenian Genocide and its survivors.

== Notable people ==
- Majdi Allawi (born 1970), Maronite priest, association founder
- Jihad Azour (born 1966), economist

== Twin towns – sister cities ==
Byblos is twinned with:

- Bonifacio, France
- Mangalia, Romania
- Orange, France
- Patras, Greece

== Gallery ==
Byblos views

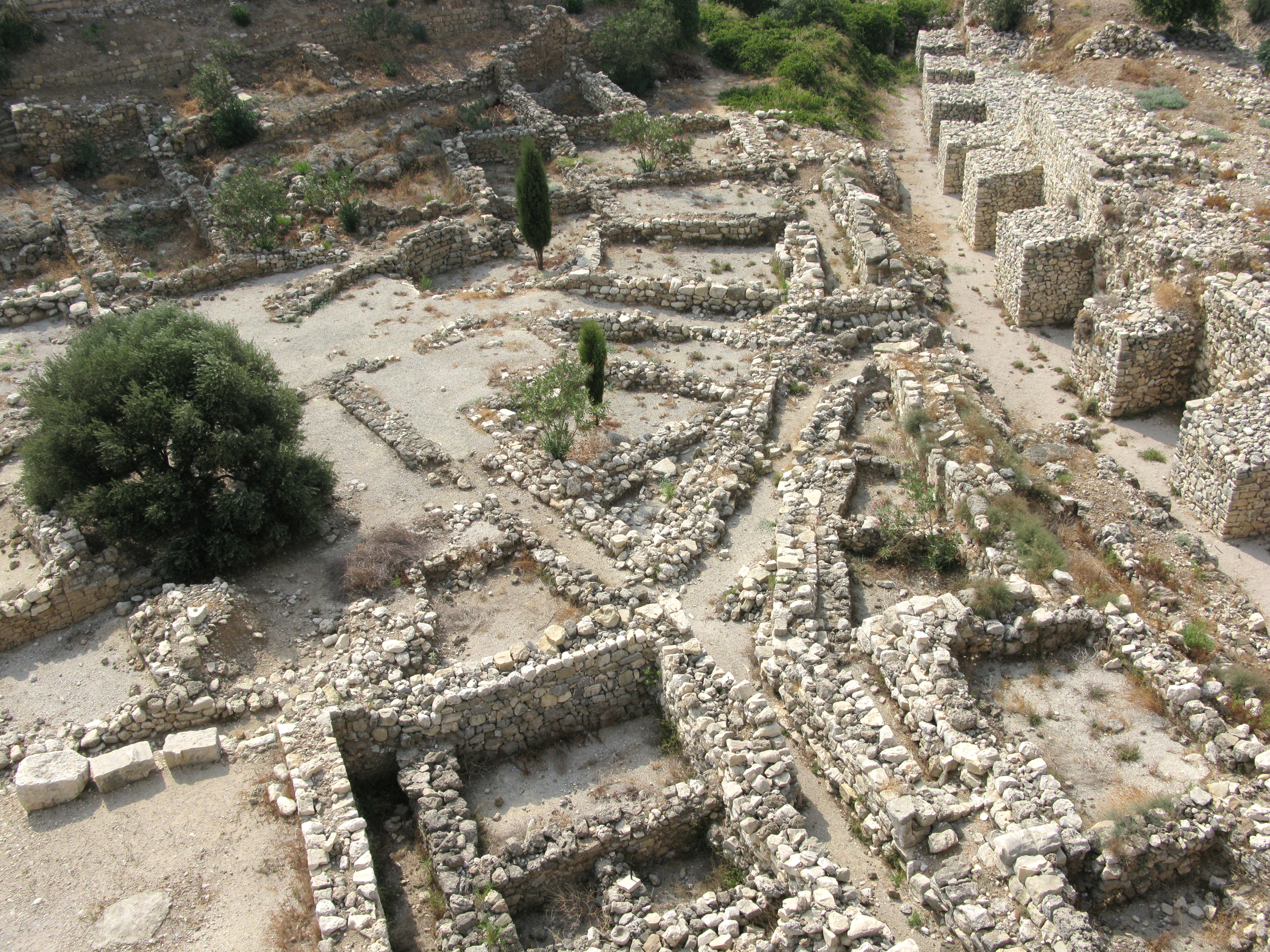

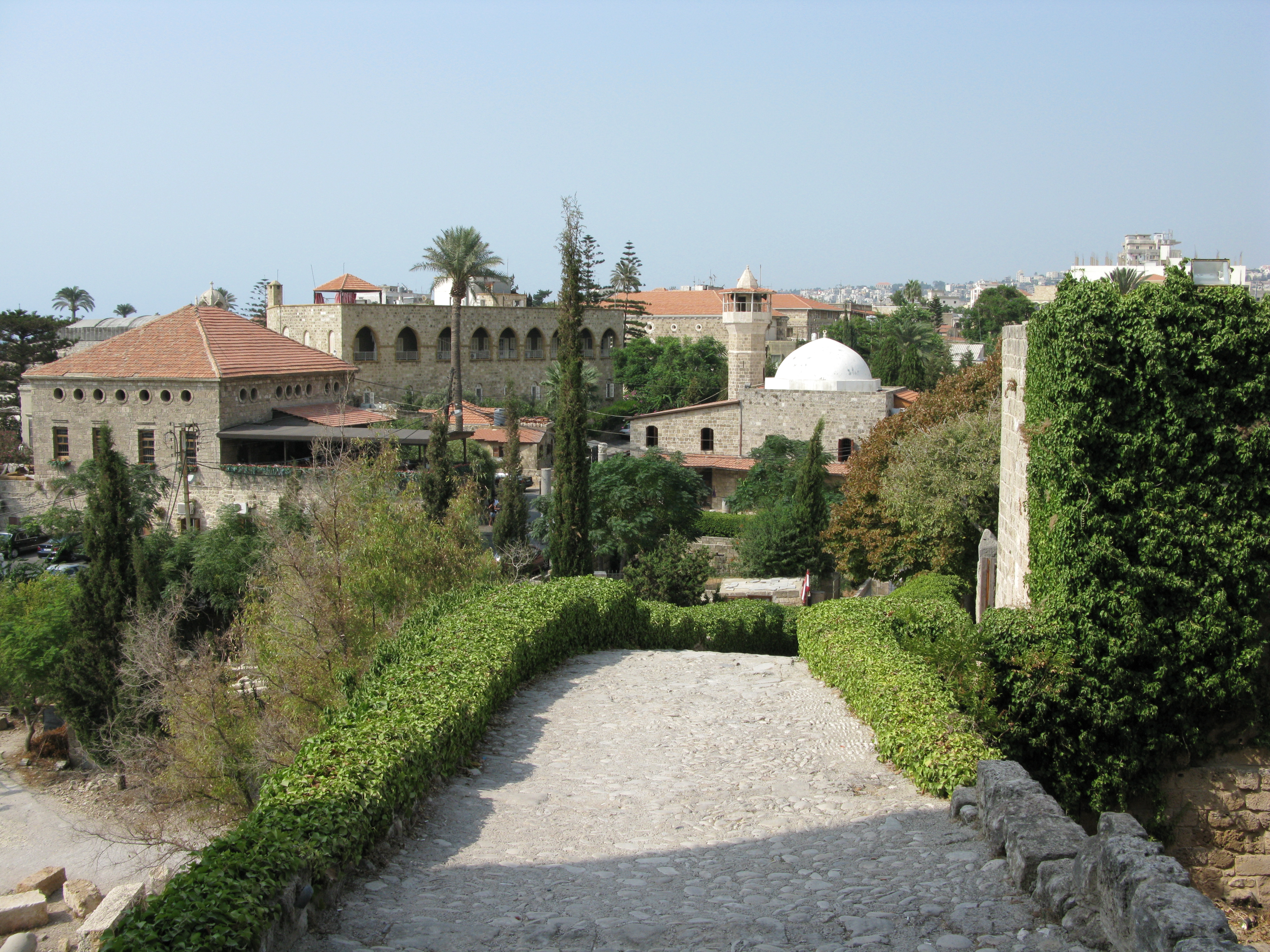

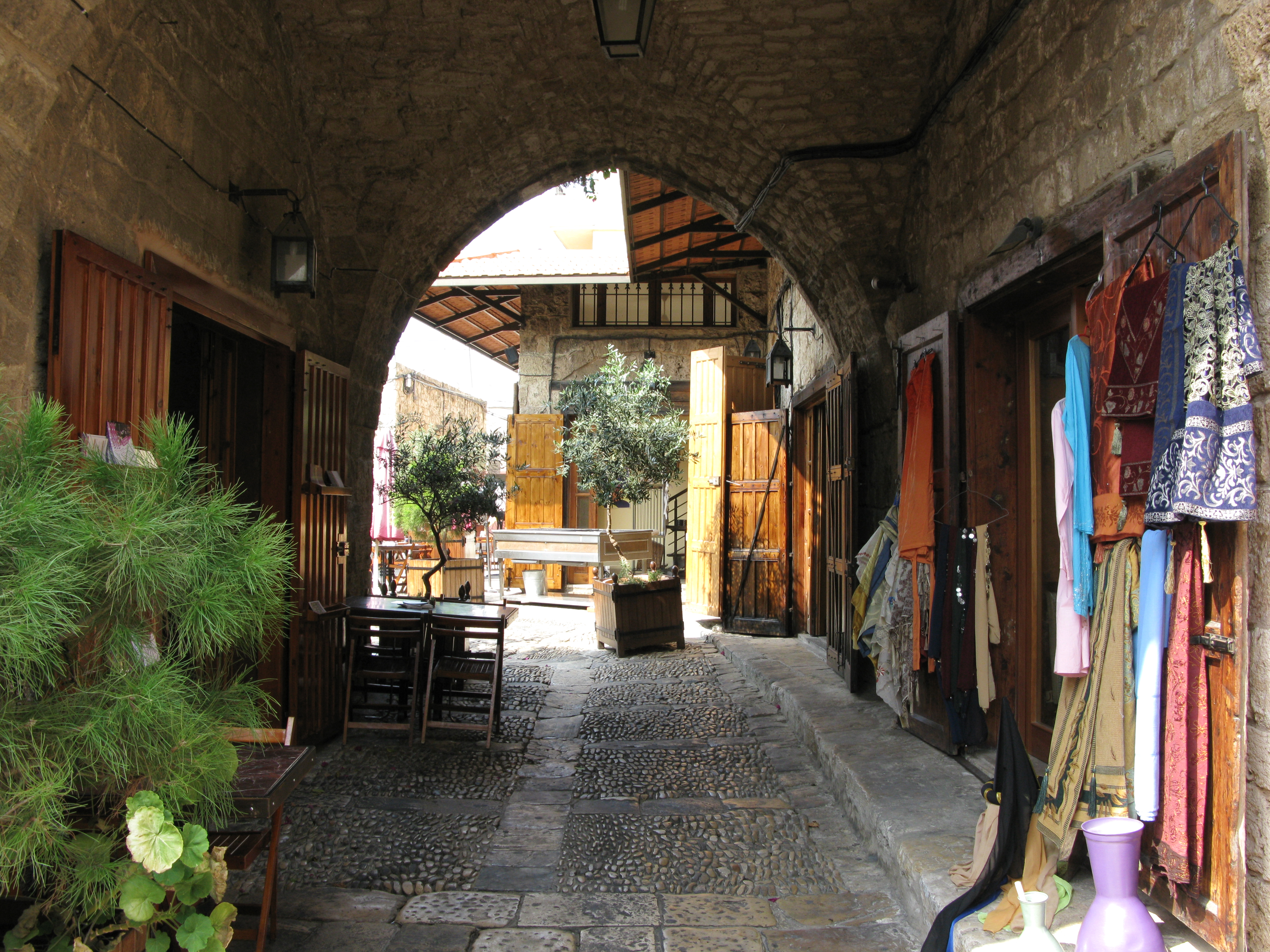

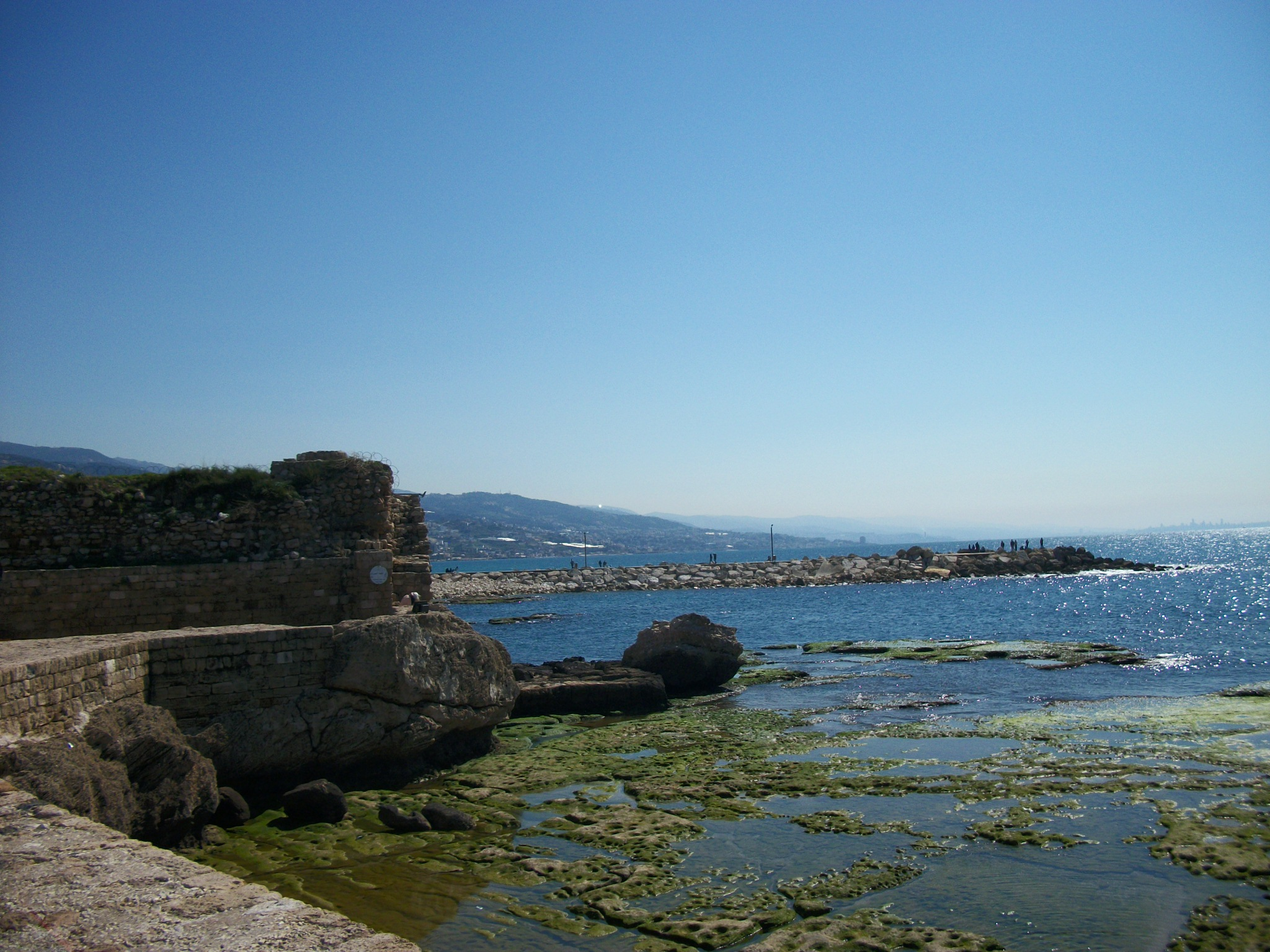

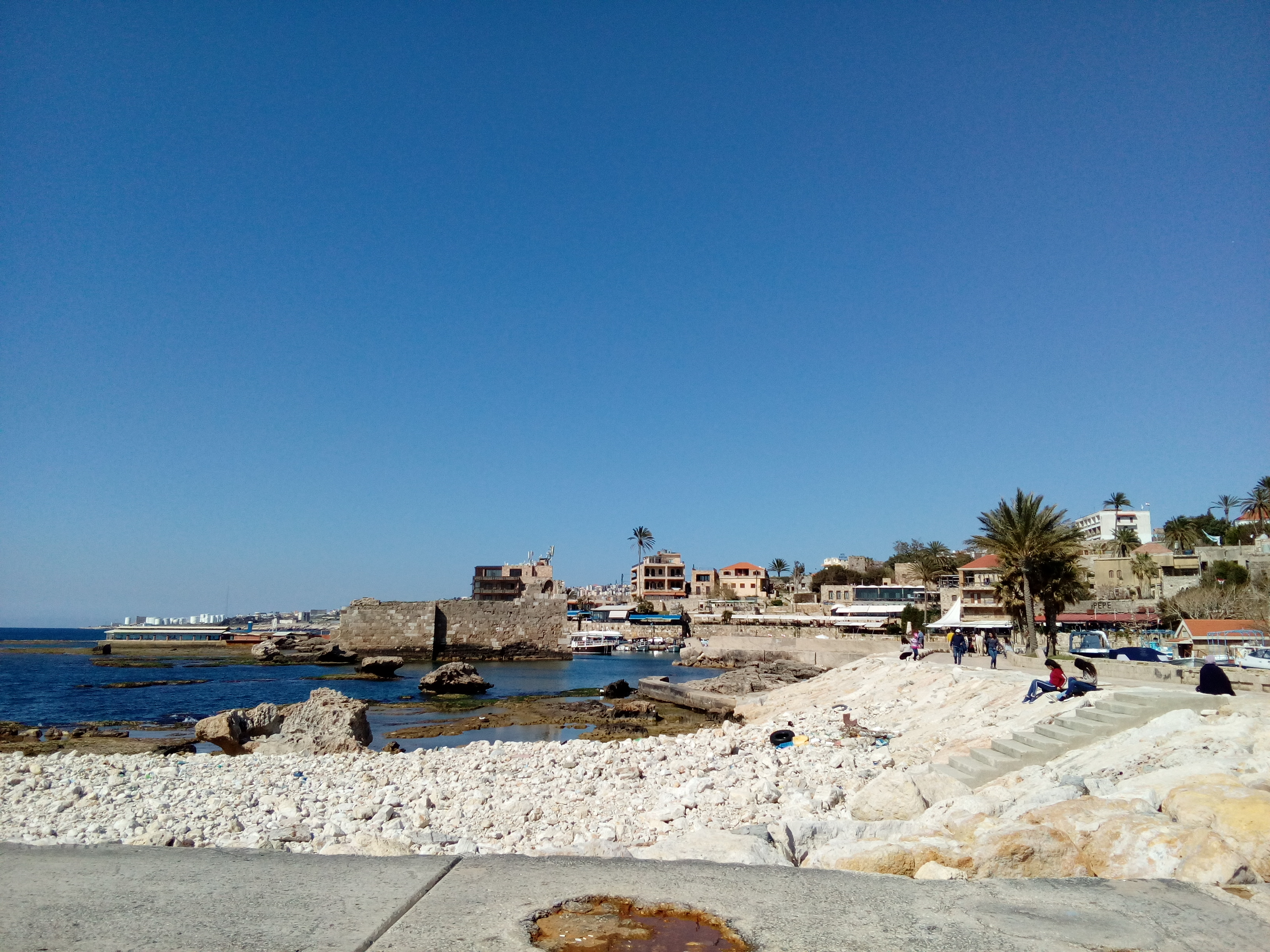

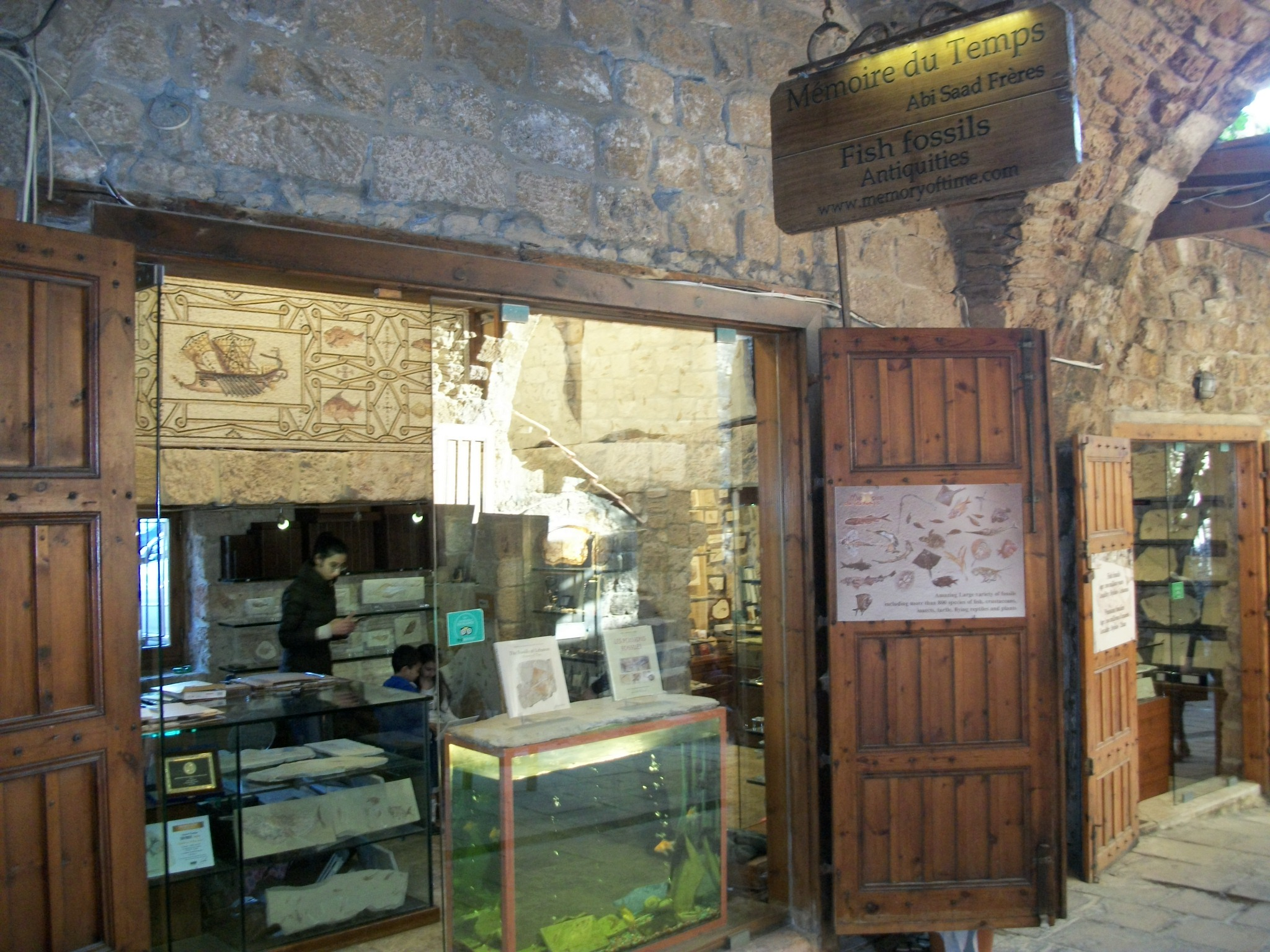

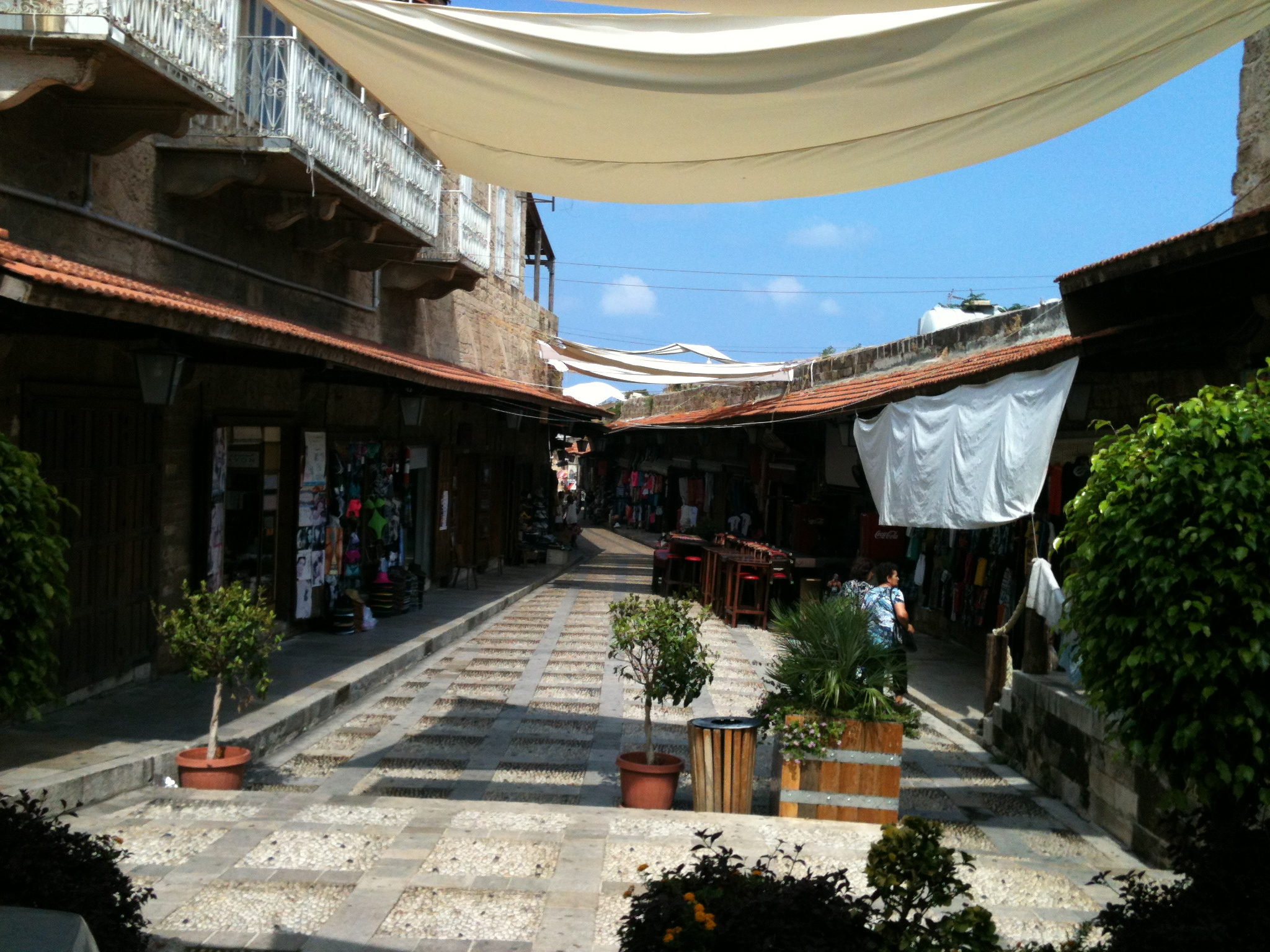

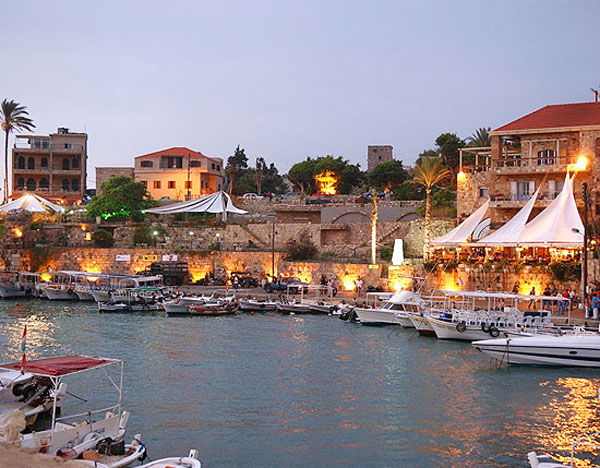

== See also ==
- Byblos syllabary
- Cities of the ancient Near East
- Dugurasu
