= Majdi Allawi =

Lebanese priest (born 1970)

Majdi Allawi (born 18 February 1970, in Byblos, Byblos District, Lebanon) is a Lebanese Maronite priest, convert to Catholicism from Shia Islam and founder of the association Bonheur du Ciel, which helps young drug addicts.

== Biography ==
Allawi comes from a Lebanese Shia Muslim family and converted to Catholicism on 15 August 1981, when he was only 11 years old. Becoming a Catholic priest, he founded the association Bonheur du Ciel, which essentially helps young addicts in Lebanon. He also founded in Bourj Hammoud the first restaurant for the poor of the country. On the first day of Lent 2014, when he wanted to give one of his kidneys to a person waiting for a transplant, medical tests reveal that he has a serious stomach problem due to a very severe virus. Dying, he was cured on the day of the Assumption without medical explanation, few days after his son had been praying at the tomb of St. Charbel Makhlouf, at Annaya. He concludes: "On August 15, 1981, I was born for the first time in the Spirit as a Christian. On August 15, 2014, I was born again, by the gift of healing that Saint Charbel granted me".

In 2017, Father Allawi suffered an accident when he crashed his car and his son was with him, but they survived to it.
