= St. John's Cathedral, Byblos =

Church in Byblos, Lebanon

Coordinates: 34°7′17.35″N 35°38′42.73″E

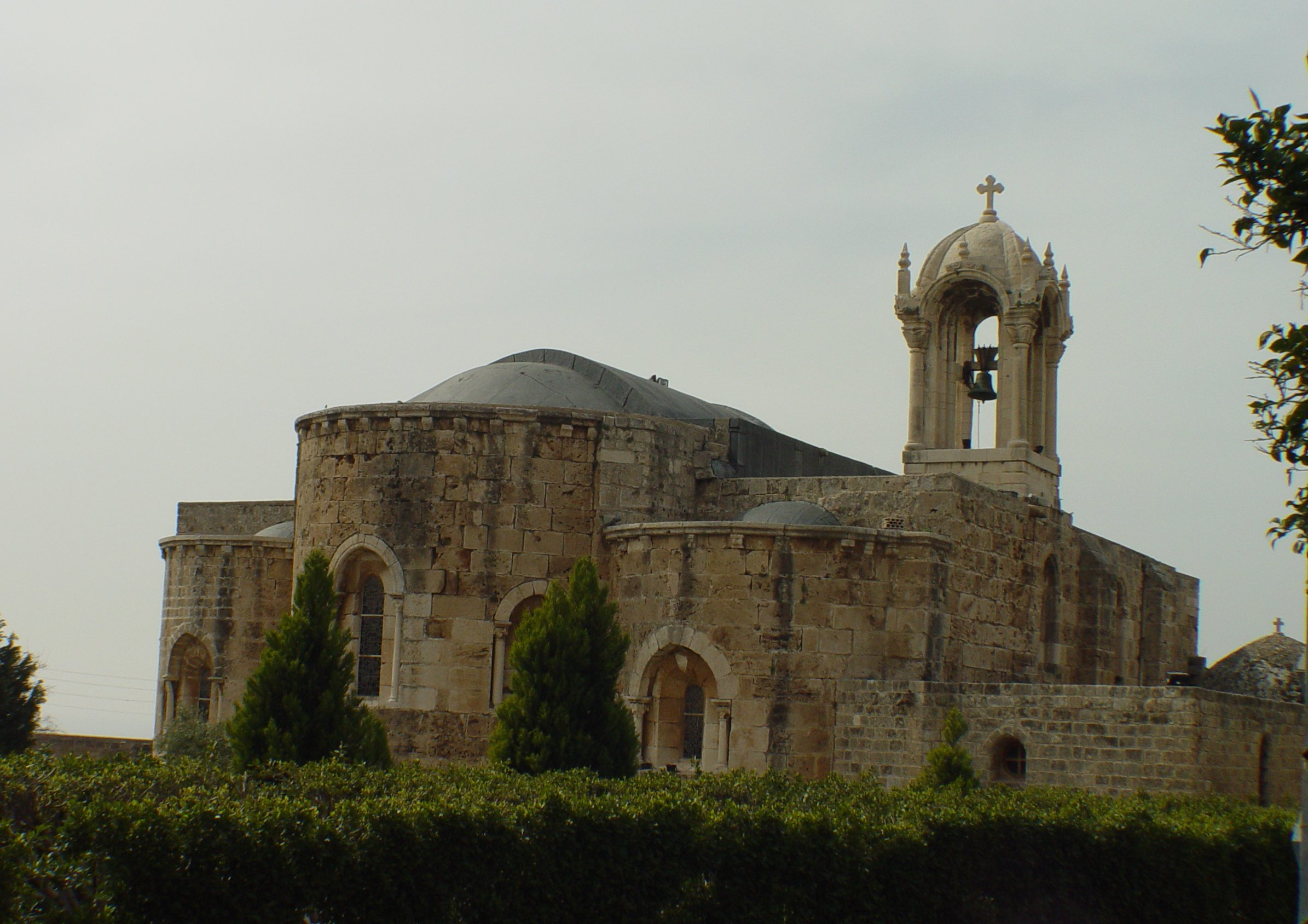
St. John's Cathedral, Byblos

St. John's Cathedral is a Romanesque cathedral in the Lebanese city of Byblos. The church is dedicated to St. Jean Mark, Byblos' patron saint and founder of the town's initial Christian community.

== History ==
The church was constructed in 1115 by the Crusaders, originally known as the Cathedral of Saint John the Baptist. A number of environmental disasters hit the structure including earthquakes, and the church fell into disrepair until 1764, when Yusuf Shihab donated the block to the Lebanese Maronite Order; they restored the building and reopened it in 1776. Shelling during the Oriental Crisis of 1840 once more inflicted damage, but it was repaired; the church is open for visitors today.

== Gallery ==
St. John's Cathedral, Byblos
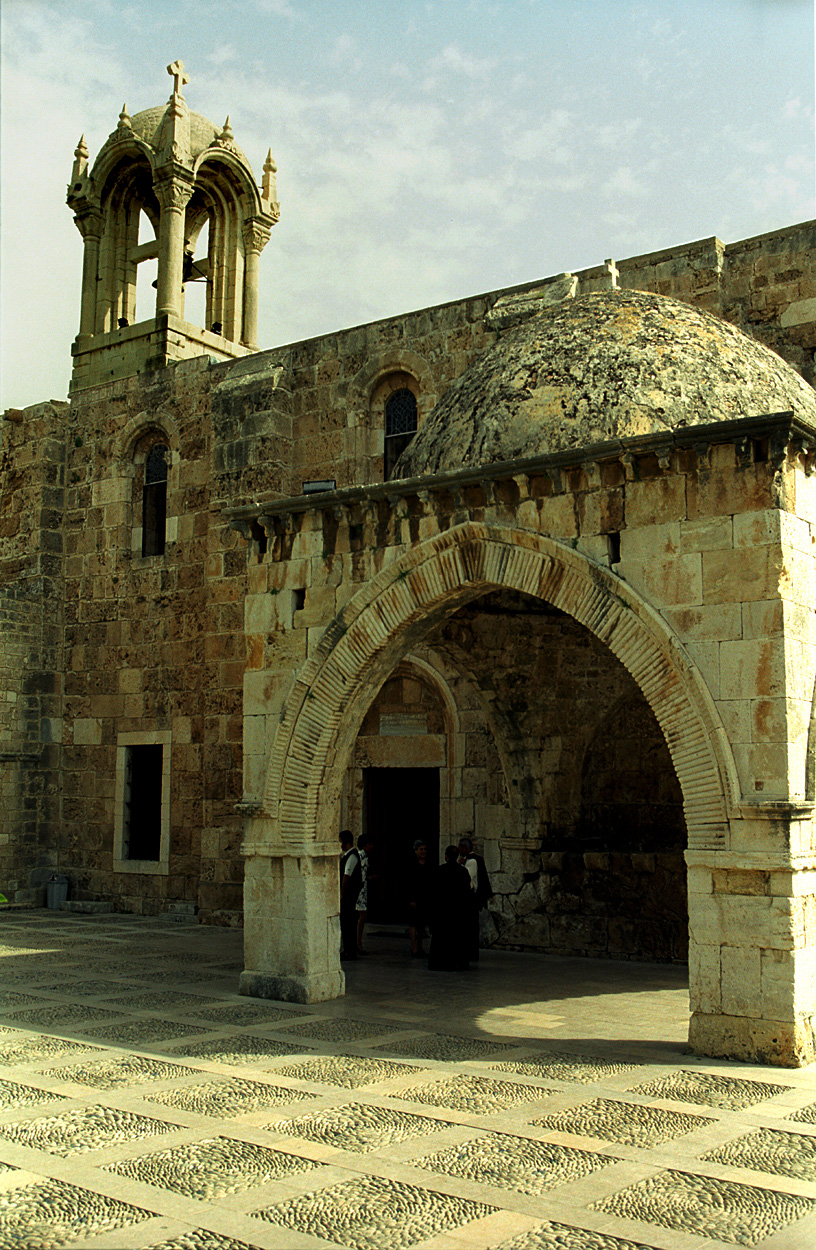
Baptistery

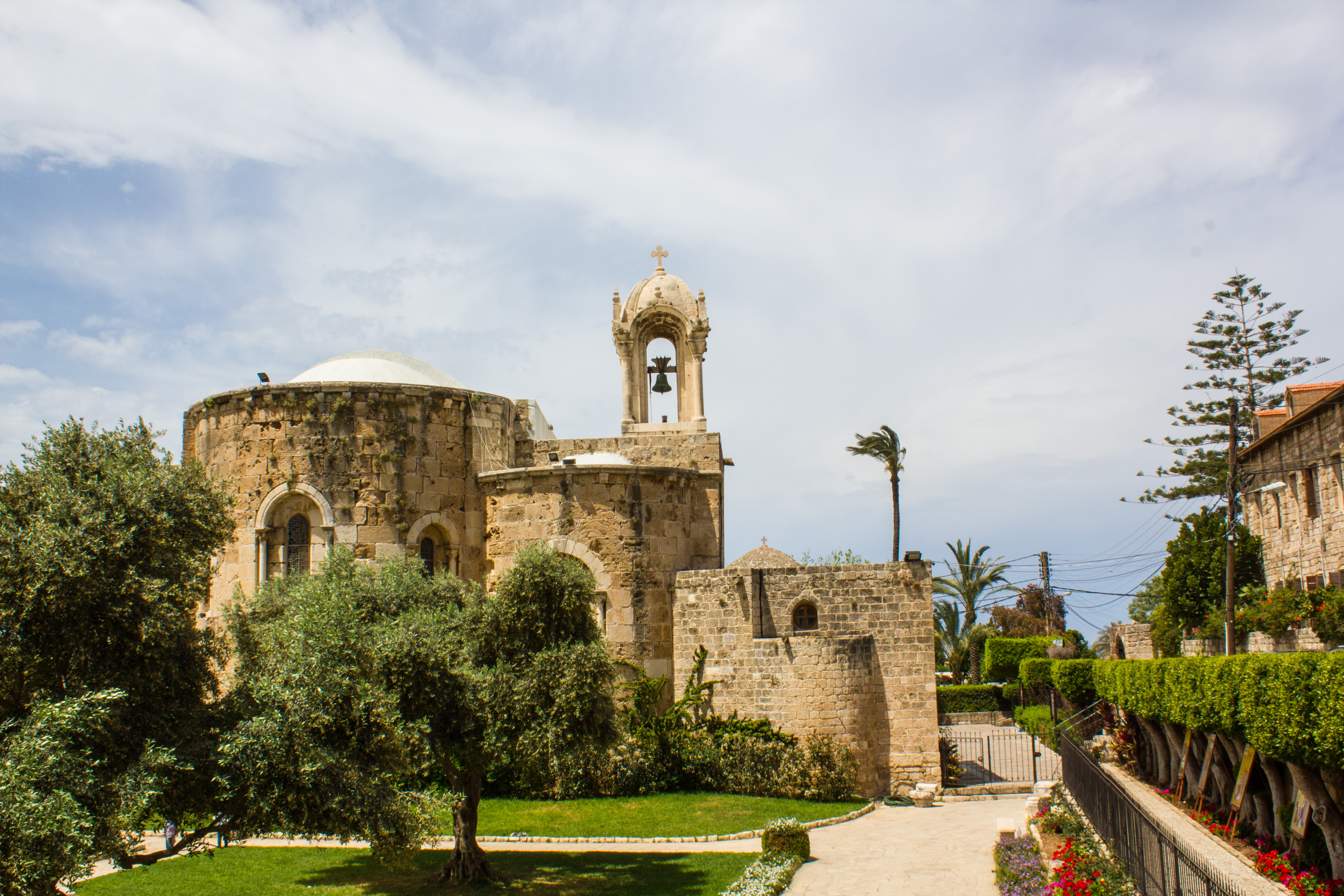
Belfry

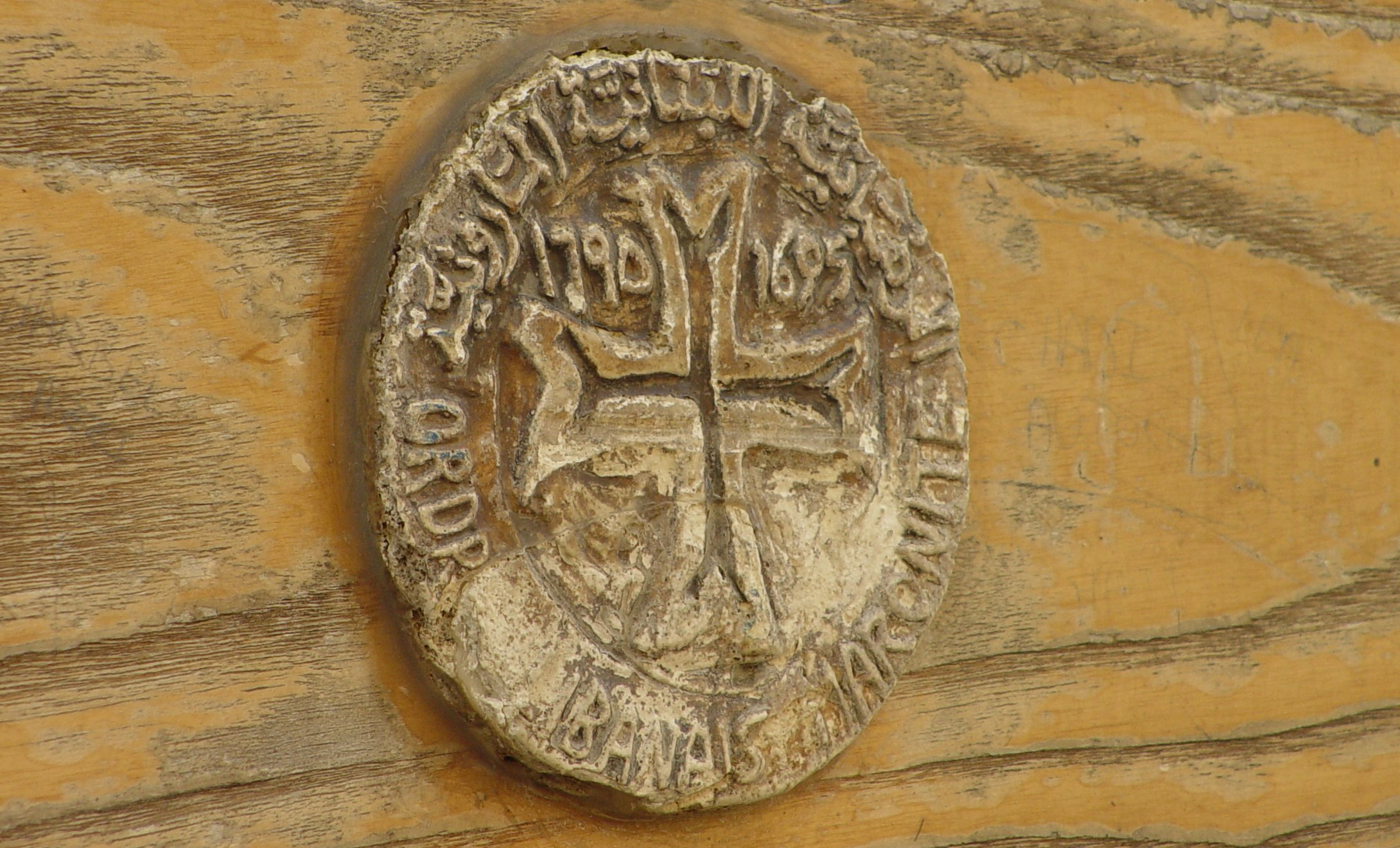
Crest of the Lebanese Maronite Order

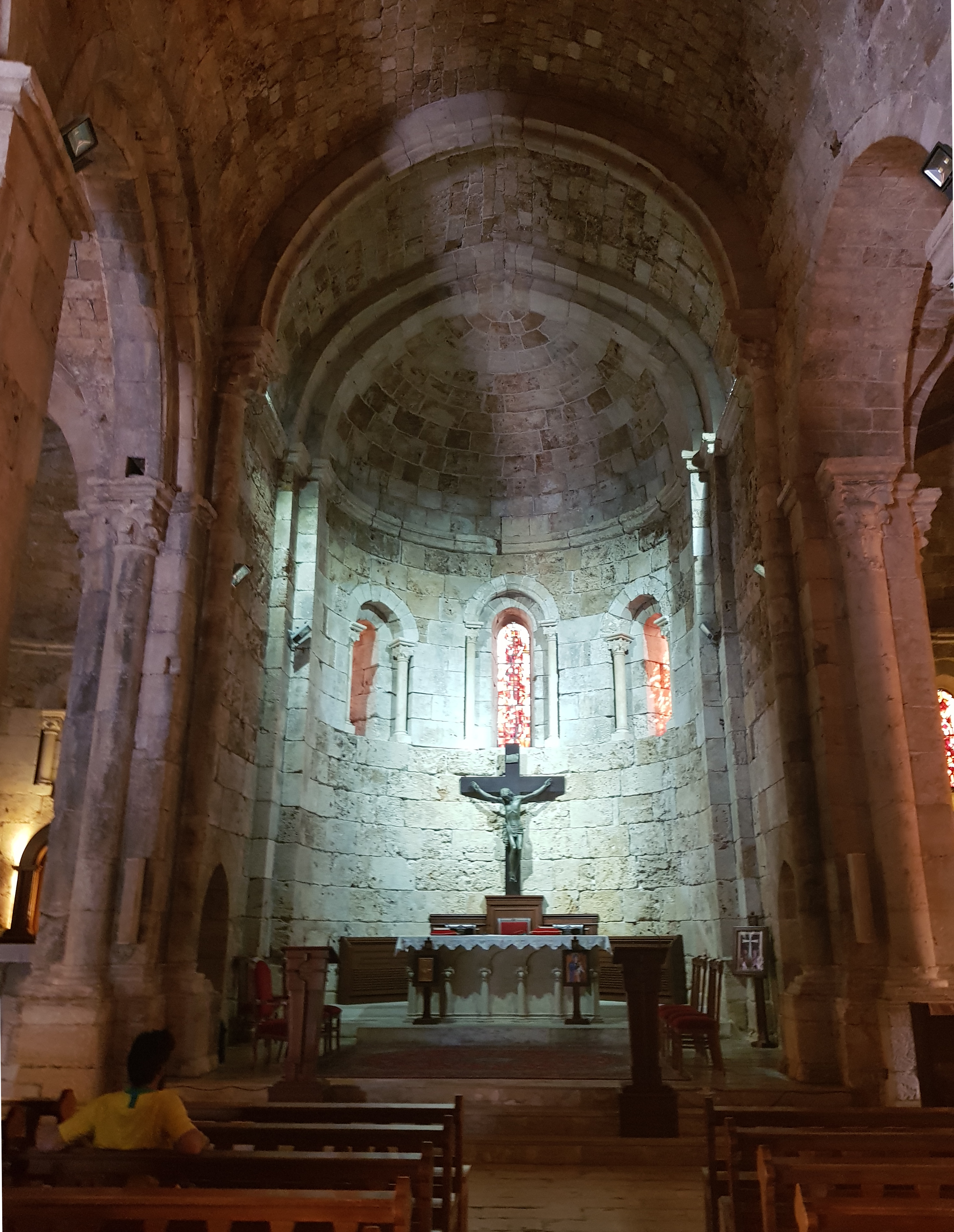
Altar

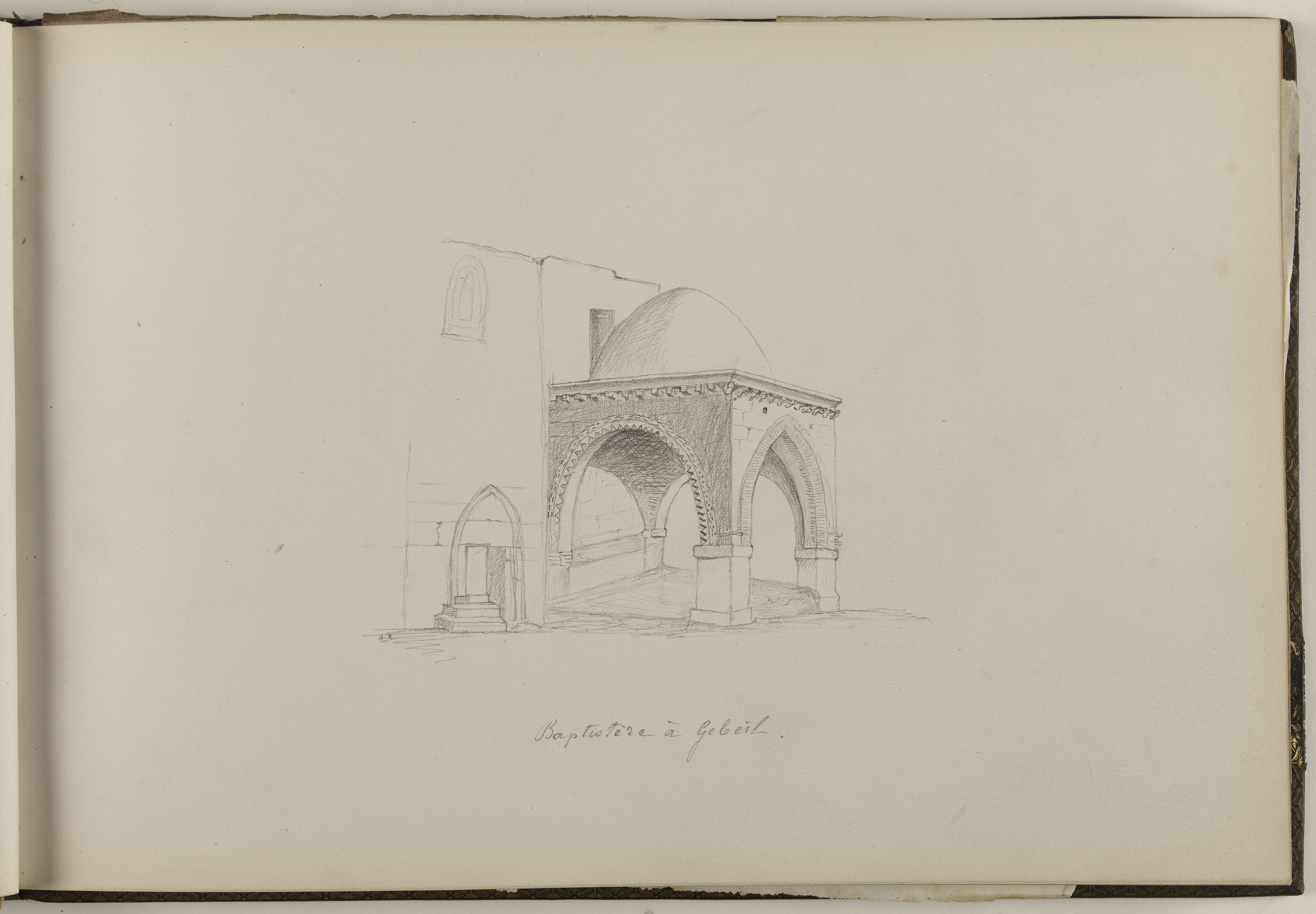
Portico sketch by Ary Renan, 1878
