= Byblos Port =

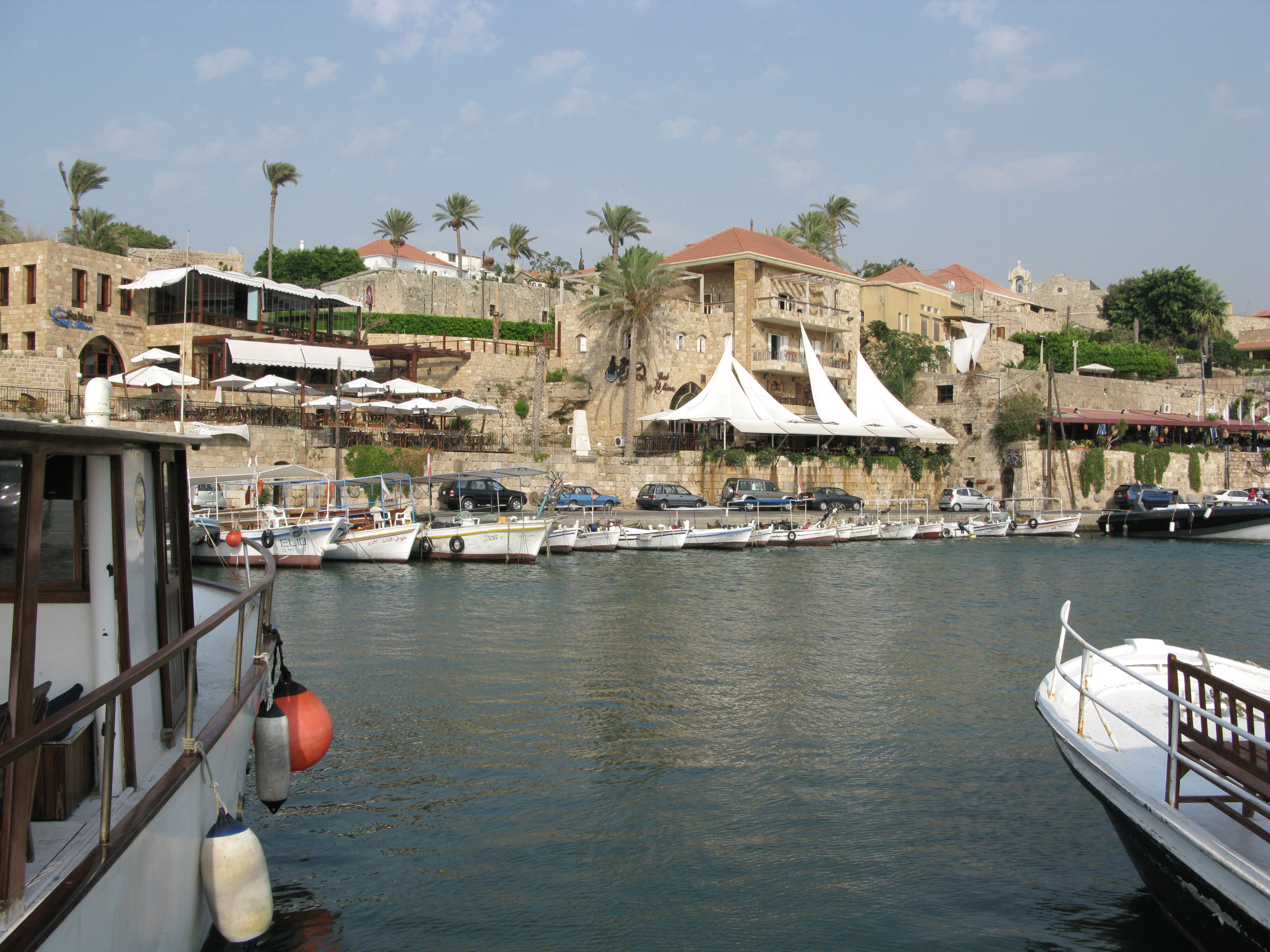
Byblos Port

Byblos Port is an ancient port in Byblos, Lebanon, and one of the oldest ports in the world. What began around 6500 BC as a simple fishing village grew into a prosperous city with a rich history. Around 3000 BC, Byblos Port was the most important timber shipping center in the eastern Mediterranean. It was used by the Phoenicians to ship their local wine, cedars of Lebanon and other wood to the Pharaohs of Ancient Egypt to be used in tomb construction and shipbuilding.
