= Byblos script =

Byblos script may refer to:

- Byblos syllabary (c. 1700 BC)
- Phoenician script (c. 1200 BC)
