= Dark faced burnished ware =

Second oldest form of pottery developed in the western world

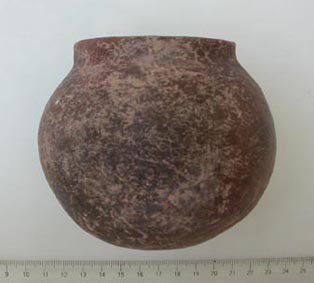
Vessel of 'dark faced burnished ware' from Shir, in Syria

Dark faced burnished ware (DFBW) is the second oldest form of pottery developed in the western world, the oldest being Dotted wavy line pottery from Africa.

It was produced after the earliest examples from the independent phenomenon of the Jōmon culture in Japan and is predominantly found at archaeological sites in Lebanon, Israel southwest Syria and Cyprus. Some notable examples of dark faced burnished ware were found at Tell Judaidah (and nearby Tell Dhahab) in Amuq by Robert Braidwood as well as at Ras Shamra and Tell Boueid. Other finds have been made at Yumuktepe in Mersin, Turkey where comparative studies were made defining different categories of ware that have been generally grouped as DFBW. It is thought to have come as a development of White Ware and takes its name from the often dark coloured choice of clays from which it is made. Vessels are often coarse, tempered with grit or sand, burnished to a shiny finish and made with a variety of clays in different areas. The grit or sand is thought to have made the vessels easier to fire and the burnishing made them less permeable and suitable for heated liquid substances.

Later examples are usually finer and more carefully burnished and decorated. Designs included rounded, inverted or straight sided bowls with plain rims, some with basic handles under the rims along with ring bases in the later pieces. Decorations included incised or impressed chevrons or motifs with pattern burnishing appearing in later periods. Other types of pottery were produced around the same time including coarse impressed ware, dark faced unburnished ware and washed impressed ware but these were less prevalent.

DFBW has long been considered the forebear of the more polished examples such as ancient Greek pottery.
