= Shir (Neolithic site) =

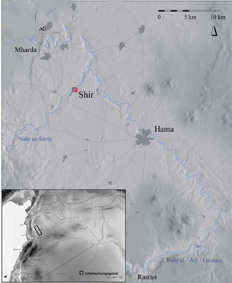
Place of the archaeological site at Shir

Shir (German transcription according to the German Oriental Society [DMG]: Šīr/Arabic: شير) is a Late Neolithic site in western Syria, located 12 km northwest of Hama, capital of the province by the same name. The settlement of Shir is situated upon a 30-m high terrace formation above the Nahr as-Sārūt, a tributary of the Orontes River (Arabic: Nahr al-‛Asi).

== History of research ==
The settlement of Shir was discovered in 2005 during a local survey in the central Orontes area and archaeologically investigated from 2006 to 2010 within the framework of a cooperation project by the Damascus Branch of the Orient Department of the German Archaeological Institute (DAI) and the Direction Générale des Antiquités et des Musées de la Syrie. The natural conditions of the central Orontes characterise the region as one of the favourable areas in the Near East, which must have played a decisive role during the process of Neolithisation (Neolithisation: the transition from economical forms marked by hunting/gathering nomadic way of life to food producing sedentism, which occurred between 10,000 and 7000 B.C.). Comparatively few Neolithic sites are known in this region thus far.

== Settlement ==
According to radiocarbon datings, the settlement of Shir was inhabited between 7000 and 6200/6100 calBC (calibrated data). The site was abandoned towards the end of the 7thmillennium B.C. and thereafter – possibly due to climatic change – never permanently populated again. Because of this circumstance, particular areas of the 4-ha large settlement could be excavated extensively, allowing specific lines of inquiries to be followed. Thus, in the southern area the stratigraphic sequence was investigated over a surface of 400 m^{2}; in the central area the two latest settlement layers covering a surface of 1,000 m^{2} were exposed; and in the northeastern area two buildings with specific functions and encompassing some 700 m^{2} were examined.

== Architecture ==
For the time span between 7000 and 6450 B.C. the stratigraphic sequence in the southern area covers six subsequent building phases, each showing diverse sub-phases. A differentiated settlement development could be confirmed in this area, which is characterised by its distinct conceptual planning. Particularly remarkable is the fact that at a later time stone material was removed from all layers and evidently reused. Building activities noted in younger layers of the central area are characterized by numerous heterogeneous forms of house complexes, whose relationship to one another is disturbed by pits. These buildings date back to ca. 6300/6200 B.C. In the northeastern area an apparently planned building complex consisting of two northwest–southeast oriented structures with altogether 16 rooms was recorded; it was presumably abandoned around 6200/6100 B.C. These buildings were probably two-storied. The structure and room contents of the preserved and excavated ground floors indicate their primary usage as storerooms, which could be accessed only through the upper floors with the help of ladders. These buildings could have functioned as communal storerooms as well as a combination of living and storage space for a person or a group of persons of high social status.

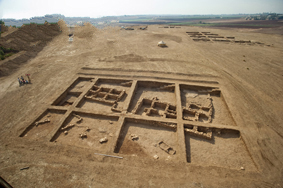
Northeastern area

As a rule, the foundation walls of the buildings in Shir are built of limestone, which occurs naturally in this region, while the few remains of the brick walls are generally made of clay or rammed earth (pisé). Most remarkable in all layers are the massive, carefully created lime plaster floors. The technique in floors was already known in the Early Neolithic (10th–8th century B.C.) and is characterized by a high demand on burning material. Consequently, a certain degree of environmental destruction in settlement's vicinity cannot be excluded.

The ecological conditions for the settlement were extraordinarily favourable, because at least two bountiful habitats were present for use: the surrounding, open oak forest and the dense floodplain forest of the Sarut as well as the Orontes rivers, flowing ca. 4 km west of the settlement. Water supply was secured by the perennial Sarut River. Raw materials for constructing buildings and producing items for everyday use, such as limestone and basalt stone, flint and clay, were available in the immediate vicinity of the settlement. The region's fertile terra rossa soils allowed profitable agricultural activities. As paleobotanical data show, all of the important grains and pulses were grown in Shir: barley, emmer/einkorn wheat, hulled wheat, lentils, field peas, chickpeas and bitter vetch. Wild plants included pistachios, figs and almonds, among others. Aside from domesticated animal species like sheep, goats and cattle, the spectrum of animals also comprised hunted animals like gazelle and deer.

== Burials ==
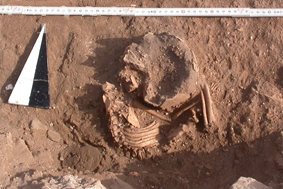
Baby funeral

There are numerous burials within the excavated part of the southern settlement area. Most of them were the graves of infants and young children, which were found in buildings under walls and stretches of lime plaster. Burials of adults were seldom, appearing mostly as individual graves outside of the houses. In the youngest layer of the central area was a larger space with numerous burials, which possibly can be addressed as an extramural necropolis. All of the burials contained only few grave goods. Turquoise beads are an exception and were found only in the graves of infants.

== Finds ==
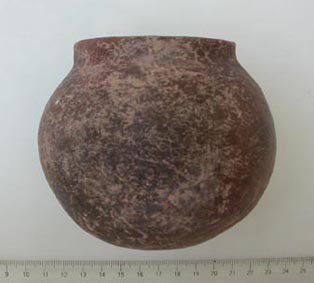
Vessel of the Dark Faced Burnished Ware

Ceramic finds already appear in Shir in the oldest settlement layer, dated to ca. 7000 B.C. This pottery thus belongs to the earliest ceramic finds in the Near East. Made of fired clay, the vessels represent one of the most important innovations that occurred at the transition from the Early to Late Neolithic around 7000 B.C. The oldest ceramic vessels known so far already display a very high quality. They are the so-called Dark faced burnished ware (DFBW), which is tempered with minerals and highly polished; the dominant forms in Shir are small pots and bowls, which were likely produced in small quantities only. A special type of DFBW is pottery decorated with cord and textile impressions. This cord-impressed ware also provides important information about Neolithic textile production. From ca. 6500 B.C. onwards pottery was produced in significantly greater quantities, yet of lesser quality. The so-called Coarse Ware has a high content of mineral temper and is rarely decorated. The production of large vessels that reach heights of 0.80–1.00 m can be considered as the most important innovation during the second half of the 7th millennium B.C. These vessels were probably used as storage containers for foodstuffs.

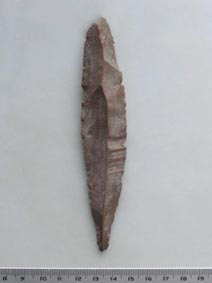
Flint tip of Amuq-Type

Next to pottery, flint tools make up the bulk of the spectrum of archaeological finds. Noticeable within this range of tools is the comparatively large number of sickles, which were used for harvesting basic subsistence crops. Points of the Amuq- and Babylos types form a further outstanding, but small group of artefacts. The spectrum of tools is dominated by a very large number of so-called ad hoc implements, i.e. simple flint flakes lacking any elaborated form. The reason for this decline in distinct forms is likely the advantageous position of Shir for acquiring raw materials: high-quality flint occurs in the terraces directly below the settlement. Another reason could have been a decrease in hunting activities. The obsidian used to produce the small number of such flakes and tools found in Shir originated in Central Anatolia.

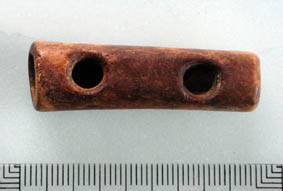
Bone flute

Other small finds include weapons, such as sling stones and bolas, as well as utensils for preparing food, such as grinding stones, mortars and pestles, all of which are especially well represented. Similarly, artefacts that were most likely implemented in textile and leather processing, like sewing needles, awls and scrapers, appeared frequently. Initially, these artefacts were probably produced when needed in the individual homes; mass finds of semi-finished products (for example, sewing needles made from animal bones) appear in younger settlement phases, signalling a specialisation in crafts. One remarkable bone artefact is perforated and flute-shaped. Typical articles of jewellery comprise different forms of pendants and beads; finger rings and bracelets as well as lip plugs. Especially noteworthy are so-called butterfly beads made of greenstone and small cylindrical beads made of turquoise. These stones are not native to the area of Shir; hence, their presence at the site supports the assumption of Shir's participation in far-reaching exchange networks, from southeastern Anatolia to the Sinai Peninsula.

Investigations at Shir have enabled comprehensive insight into the development of a Neolithic village over a time span of almost 800 years. The recorded data provide evidence of complex architecture, the differentiated use of raw materials and elaborate techniques employed in constructing buildings and manufacturing artefacts. Furthermore, excavations at the site have shown that Shir was integrated in the Neolithic network of exchange and communication that extended from Anatolia to the Red Sea. In comparison with other coeval settlements in the Levant, northern Mesopotamia and the Anatolian region, the finds from Shir exhibit a strongly regional component of the cultural development during the Late Neolithic period.

== Literature ==
- Karin Bartl, A. Farzat, W. al-Hafian 2012: The Late Neolithic Site of Shir. New Results from 2010, in: Zeitschrift für Orient-Archäologie 5, 2012, 168–187.
- Karin Bartl, A. Haidar, mit Beiträgen von O. Nieuwenhuyse und D. Rokitta-Krumnow 2008: Shir – Ein neolithischer Fundplatz am mittleren Orontes. Vorläufiger Bericht über die Ergebnisse der Testkampagne Herbst 2005 und Grabungskampagne Frühjahr 2006, in: Zeitschrift für Orient-Archäologie 1, 2008, 54–88.
- Karin Bartl, M. Hijazi, J. Ramadan, mit einem Beitrag von Reinder Neef 2009: Die spätneolithische Siedlung Shir/Westsyrien. Vorläufiger Bericht über die Ergebnisse der Grabungskampagnen Herbst 2006 und Frühjahr 2007, in: Zeitschrift für Orient-Archäologie 2, 2009, 140–161.
- Karin Bartl, M. al-Maqdissi 2007: Ancient Settlements in the Middle Orontes Region Between ar-Rastan and Qal´at Shayzar. First Results of Archaeological Surface Investigations 2003-2004, in: Daniele Morandi Bonacossi (Hrsg.): Urban and Natural Landscapes of an Ancient Syrian Capital. Settlement and Environment at Tell Mishrifeh/Qatna and in Central-Western Syria, Udine, 9–11 December 2004, Udine, Studi Archeologici su Qatna, Forum, Udine 2007, 227–236.
- Karin Bartl, J. Ramadan 2008: The Late Neolithic Site of Shir. Third Season of Excavations 2007, in: Chronique Archéologique en Syrie 3, 2008, 63–73.
- Karin Bartl, J. Ramadan, W. al-Hafian 2010: Shir/West Syria. Results of the fourth and fifth seasons of excavations in 2008, in: Chronique Archéologique en Syrie 4, 2010, 59–66.
- Karin Bartl, J. Ramadan, W. al-Hafian 2011: Shir/West Syria. Results of the sixth and seventh season of excavations in 2009, in: Chronique Archéologique en Syrie 5, 2011, 51–60.
- O. Nieuwenhuyse 2009: The Late Neolithic Ceramics from Shir. A First Assessment, in: Zeitschrift für Orient-Archäologie 2, 2009, 310–356.
- O. P. Nieuwenhuyse, Karin Bartl, K. Berghuijs, G. Vogelsang-Eastwood 2012: The cord-impressed pottery from the Late Neolithic Northern Levant: Case-study Shir, in: Paléorient 38, 2012, 65–77.
- D. Rokitta-Krumnow 2011: The lithic artifacts from the Late Neolithic settlement of Shir/Western Syria, in: Zeitschrift für Orient-Archäologie 4, 2011, 212–244.
- D. Rokitta-Krumnow 2012: Lithikfunde des 7. Jahrtausends v. Chr. in der nördlichen Levante. Die Entwicklung der Steingeräteindustrie der spätneolithischen Siedlung Shir/Syrien. Dissertation am Fachbereich Geschichts- und Kulturwissenschaften der Freien Universität Berlin 2012 online
