= Ghisolfi =

Genoese-Jewish family

De Ghisolfi (also known as de Guizolfi, de Gisolfi, Guigursis, Guilgursis and Giexulfis) was the name of a Genoese-Jewish family prominent in the late Middle Ages and the early Renaissance. A Genoese-Circassian branch was active in the Circassian region, and married into the local aristocracy.

In 1419, the Genoese Jew Simeone de Ghisolfi married a reigning princess of the municipality of Tmutarakan on the Taman Peninsula named Bikhakhanim, and took possession of this area, most likely centred on the town of Matrega. The de Ghisolfi clan ruled this principality as a protectorate of the Genoese consulate of Gazaria for much of the 15th century.

In 1453, the Republic of Genoa ceded its Crimean possessions to the Bank of St. George, a private enterprise to which it was heavily in debt. The Ghisolfi family continued to rule Matrega and the surrounding region on behalf of the Bank. Through such intermediaries as Khozi Kokos, they maintained relations with the rulers of Muscovy and other Russian principalities.

== Zacharias de Ghisolfi ==
A descendant of Simeone, Zacharias de Ghisolfi was the prince and ruler of the Taman Peninsula from about 1480. Beset by the Ottoman Empire (which was then in the process of reducing the Girai Khanate and the Italian possessions in the Crimea to tributary status) in 1482, Zacharias and his subjects, a mixed population of Jews, Italians, Greeks, Circassians, Tatars and Slavs, were compelled to retire from Matrega and sought refuge on the island of Matrice. On August 12 of that year, Zacharias informed the directors of the Bank of Saint George in Genoa of his position, and requested for 1,000 ducats with which to retain the friendship of his allies, the Crimean Goths of Feodoro, who had exhausted his resources; he stated that unless he received the support of the republic, he would move to Wallachia, where the voivode had offered him a castle.

=== Contact with Muscovy ===
Notwithstanding the fact that the Turks had captured Tana (Azov) and most of the settlements in Gazaria, Ghisolfi continued the war from Matrice, but with only a small measure of success. Learning that he had expressed a desire to come to Russia, and glad of an opportunity to ally with the Circassians and other peoples resisting Ottoman incursions, Ivan III of Muscovy directed Prince Nozdrevaty, his ambassador to the Crimean Tatar khan Meñli I Giray, to forward a message "sealed with the gold seal" to Zacharias the Jew, at Caffa. This message, dated March 14, 1484, and forwarded by Luka and Prince Vasili, both court dignitaries, reads as follows:

By the grace of God the great ruler of the Russian country, the Grand Duke Ivan Vassilivich, Czar of all the Russias, ... to Skariya the Hebrew. You have written to us through Gabriel Petrov, our guest, that you desire to come to us. It is our wish that you do so. When you are with us we will give you evidence of our favourable disposition toward you. If you wish to serve us, our desire will be to confer distinction upon you; but should you not wish to remain with us and prefer to return to your own country, you shall be free to go ...

=== Departure for Moscow ===
From a despatch in Latin from Conario on the Kuban River, dated June 8, 1487, and signed "Zachariah Guigursis", it is clear that Zacharias, intending to accept Ivan's hospitality, started for Moscow, but while on the way was robbed and tortured by Stefan, the voivode of Moldavia; upon his release, he returned home. Notwithstanding this experience, Ghisolfi and his men declared themselves ready to join Ivan provided that guides were furnished them. Replying to this despatch, March 18, 1488, the Muscovite prince repeated his invitation, and informed Ghisolfi that he had notified Dmitry Shein, his ambassador at the Crimean court, that he had requested khan Meñli I Giray to send to Cherkassy two men to guide Ghisolfi to Moscow. He directed Shein to add to this number a Tatar from his own suite.

=== Fate ===
Several years passed before guides were sent, but in the spring of 1496 they reached the mouth of the Miyusha and Taigana rivers, where Zacharias was to meet them four weeks after Easter. It had been arranged that in the event of either party reaching the rendezvous before the other, the first should wait until Whitsuntide, and if need be until Peter and Paul's Day. The guides waited until St. Nicholas' Day (Dec. 6), when they learned that Ghisolfi was unable to advance on account of disturbances among his people, for "the man Zacharias is substantial, his family is great, and probably it is difficult to induce them to move." In his report to Ivan, the Crimean ambassador declared that, out of friendship for Muscovy, the khan Meñli I Giray would take Ghisolfi under his protection, but expressed concern due to Ghisolfi's having antagonized the Turks, who were the khan's overlords.

From subsequent events, it is evident that Ghisolfi entered the service of the khan, for further negotiations were carried on, and in April 1500, Ivan, instructing his ambassador, refers to Ghisolfi as "Zacharias the Fryazin," who had lived in Circassia and is now in the service of Meñli I Giray, but who never reached Russia."

=== Analysis ===
Ivan's repeated invitations to Ghisolfi seem to indicate that he hoped the latter's services would be valuable to him in extending Russian influence on the Black Sea. Yet it is strange that during a period of more than eighteen years Ghisolfi did not succeed in reaching Russia. Whether the fact that Ghisolfi was a Jew had anything to do with the impediments put in his way, it is difficult to ascertain, for no mention of him is to be found in Jewish writings. The different spellings of Zachariah's name in Italian and Russian documents—"Guizolfi," "Guigursis," and "Guilgursis"—may be attributed to errors of the Russian scribes.

== See also ==
- Buscarello de Ghizolfi

== Resources ==
- Löwe, Richard. Die Reste der Germanen am Schwarzen Meere, p. 42, Halle, 1896.
- Raisin, Jacob S. The Haskalah Movement in Russia. Philadelphia: Jewish Publication Society of America, 1913. p. 23.
- Rosenthal, Herman. "Guizolfi, Zacharias de." Jewish Encyclopedia. Funk and Wagnalls, 1901–1906; citing:

- Atti della Società Ligure di Storia Patria, iv. 127, 128, Genoa, 1866;
- Löwe, Die Reste der Germanen am Schwarzen Meere, pp. 42, 86, 89, Halle, 1896;
- Sbornik Gosudarstvennykh Gramot i Dogovorov, ii. 24.
