= Borsa di Genova =

Italian Stock Exchange

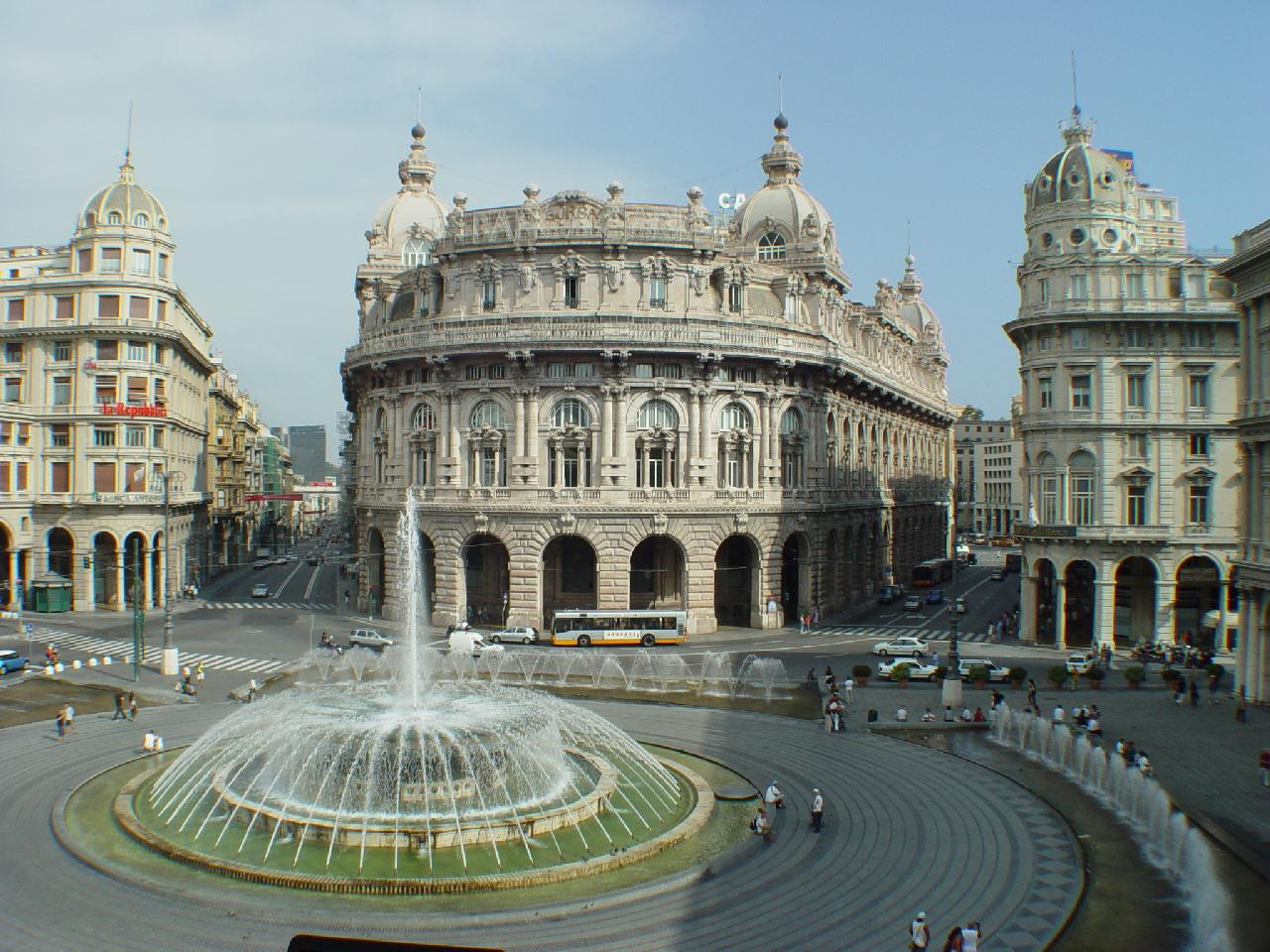
The Palazzo della Borsa di Genova

The Genoa Stock Exchange was one of the ten Italian stock exchanges active until 1997, when they were unified into the Italian Stock Exchange.

== History ==
Although in Genoa stock trading, typically on the Banco di San Giorgio's «places», had been taking place for centuries under the Loggia in Piazza Banchi, the local merchant class long opposed the introduction of a regulated market in the Ligurian city. However, as early as 1842 the bulletins indicated the listing of shares.

The Genoa Stock Exchange was only established in 1855 on the initiative of Cavour, who wanted to modernise the economy of the Kingdom of Sardinia. The seat was initially placed in the Palazzo Gio Batta Senarega, but traders often returned to meet in the adjacent Loggia di Banchi, so in 1859 the Stock Exchange was moved back to its historical location.

At the time of the Unification of Italy the Genoa stock exchange was by far the most important in the new kingdom, and remained so until the end of the century. In the first post-unification decades, more than two-thirds of the stock exchange's trading concerned public debt securities, the most important of which was the so-called Rendita 5%. In fact, most of the bourgeoisie and agrarians invested their savings in public bonds, and only the financial circles bought shares. In turn, Italian public debt securities were traded more abroad than in Italy and therefore their market price was determined by some foreign stock exchanges, especially the Paris Stock Exchange.

Among equities, bank shares played a preponderant role, since the financing of enterprises in those early decades was only partly based on direct recourse to the stock market. Industries were, in fact, mainly financed by banks, and only the latter resorted to stock market capital. There were also securities typical of the Genoese market, such as those in the maritime sector, the food sector (mills and sugar refineries) and the mining sector.

As a result of all this, among the fourteen most traded stocks on the Genoa Stock Exchange seven were banks, three of transport companies, two of aqueducts, one of a sugar refinery. Among them were the National Bank of the Kingdom of Italy, the Credito Mobiliare, the Banca Generale, the Navigazione Generale Italiana, the Acquedotto Nicolay, the Acquedotto De Ferrari Galliera.

From 1870 onwards, investment in shares surpassed that in bonds and there was a real stock market euphoria: the newspapers of the time described the middle class as suddenly dedicated to investing in the stock market. They also described, however, the setting up of banks and trading companies in excessive numbers, which became listed to collect this new flow of savings. The economic crisis of 1873 overwhelmed these companies and the capital invested in them. Therefore, after that date, fixed-income securities again prevailed over risky ones.

Nel 1873 gli scambi alla Borsa di Genova raggiunsero il valore complessivo di 3 miliardi di lire, contro il miliardo e mezzo della Borsa di Milano.

The gradual improvement of public accounts allowed the governments of the Historic Left to emancipate themselves from the financial and political tutelage of France and enter into the Triplice Alleanza with the Germany and the Austria. When Francesco Crispi went into government in 1887, the Sicilian statesman pursued a decidedly protectionist policy, which allowed for a remarkable development of Italian industry.

The system of company financing, however, was still the same as thirty years earlier. Industrialists were almost all tied to one of the two big banks of the time, Credito Mobiliare (with majority Genoese capital) and Banca Generale. The link did not only consist of the loans that the industries received from the banks: in fact, the banks often also held shares in the industrial companies. This close relationship between bank and enterprise, without recourse to the stock exchange, was fatal during the banking crisis of 1893–4. Indeed, when the Banca Romana scandal broke out, the entire Italian banking system lost the confidence of savers, who rushed to withdraw their deposits from the banks. Therefore, the two big banks also had to close their branches in the winter of 1893–34 and were subsequently liquidated.

The turning point in corporate financing came in the following years, when the Credito Italiano and the Banca Commerciale Italiana were established (with a major participation of German capital). These institutions were also universal banks, however they followed the German model of the universal bank, which stipulated that, in addition to the banks' shareholdings and financing, companies also had recourse to the capital market, in order to reduce risks. The events of 1893 had, in fact, shown that the mixed banks needed a thriving stock market so that they could easily demobilise holdings to obtain liquidity. By 1895 the long period of economic depression following the 1873 crisis had ended, so the last years of the 19th century were years of industrial and stock market growth.

The industrialisation of the Giolittian age, however, mainly concerned Milan and Piedmont, while the Ligurian and Tuscan banking 'aristocracy', linked to the French one, which had financed the post-unification period, declined.

In the early years of the 20th century, the Genoese stock exchange showed signs of crisis. In November 1906, in particular, there was a speculation on the shares of the Terni, which could not be repaid, leaving the operators in distress. This episode sowed panic in the Ligurian stock exchange and also in other Italian markets. The Economic Crisis of 1907 in Italy had as its epicentre the Genoa Stock Exchange. As a consequence of that crisis, between 1909 and 1911, the Milan Stock Exchange became the most important in Italy.

In 1912, the new headquarters overlooking Piazza De Ferrari, still called Palazzo della Borsa, was inaugurated.

In the post-war period, the Genoa Stock Exchange ranked fairly steadily in fourth place among Italian stock exchanges, after Milan, Rome and Turin.

La Borsa di Genova, come le altre borse cittadine italiane, fu chiusa nel 1997, quando il cosiddetto «decreto EuroSIM» (D. Lgs. 23 luglio 1996, n. 415) ne determinò la fusione nell’unica Borsa Italiana.

== Bibliography ==
=== Italian sources ===
- W. Piastra, Storia di una strada. Da piazza Ferrari a Ponte Pila, Tolozzi, 1962
- A. M Nicoletti, Via XX Settembre a Genova, Genova, Sagep, 1993.
