= Bika-khanum =

Bika Khanum
- Быкъэ; Бэзрыкъу ыпхъу Быкъэ

Ruler of Matrega
- In office 1419 – before 1482
- Preceded by: Berozok (Bazruq)
- Succeeded by: Zacharias de Guizolfi

Personal details
- Spouse(s): Simeone de Guizolfi or Viccenty de Ghisolfi (m. 1419)
- Children: Zacharias de Guizolfi
- Parent: Berozok (Bazruq) (father)
- Religion: Circassian paganism/Christianity

Bika, commonly known as Bika Khanum (Быкъэ-хъанум, also spelled Bika-caton; fl. 1419), was a royal princess of the Circassian principality of Hytuk, and later the reigning princess of the city of Matrega. While the de-jure head of the principality, she co-ruled with her Genoese husband as part of a deal orchestrated by her father.

== Life ==
Bika Khanum was born to Circassian (Adyghe) aristocracy. The name "Bika Khanum" might be a title, or a proper name, it is of Turkic origin, which is common in the Caucasus for nobility. Khanum is a royal title, and the name "Bika" (Adyghe: Быкъэ) is a Circassian female given name (of Turkic origin). Her father was Berozok (Adyghe: Бэзрыкъу; Bazruq, which may or may not be the same person as prince Jambech), the Circassian prince of the Hytuk Principality. In 1419, a marriage was arranged between Bika-khanum and an aristocrat from the Genoese Ghisolfi family. Bika-khanum was married either to Simeone de Guizolfi, or his son Viccenty/Vincenzo. Through this marriage, the Genoese aristocrat became her co-ruler under Genoese overlordship, her father gave the couple the city of Matrega as a dowry, and made his new son in law the heir to the property. This marriage resulted in the city of Matrega being placed under the dual administration of Genoese authorities and Adyghe princes. Simeone was considered a tributary and subject of Prince Jambech, ruler of Hytuk, who was likely the father or brother of Bika-khanum. Genoese aristocrats forming matrimonial alliances with noble Circassian families allowed them to comfortably reside in the region and govern specific towns as feudal suzerains. Through this union, the Gisolfi family integrated into the local elite. Bika-khanum and her Genoese husband had a son named Zacharias de Guizolfi (Italian: Zaccaria; Adyghe: Зэчэрые). Zacharias, who was considered half-Adyghe and half-Genoese, later succeeded as the ruler of Matrega. Zacharias de Guizolfi was still reigning in 1482. However, it is also said that she married not Simeone, but Simeone's son Viccenty de Ghisolfi. Her father-in-law Simeone became the ruler of her dowry Matrega, and her and Viccenty's son Zacharias inherited the rule. Relying on his maternal Circassian relatives and the military support of the local population, Zacharias was able to act independently from the Genoese administration in Kaffa and even entered into conflicts with the Tatar khan. Zacharias was frequently recorded as a debtor to Kaffa but refused to extradite Circassian debtors, writing to the consul of Kaffa that he could not detain them due to his close proximity and relationship to the Circassian tribes.

== See also ==
- Gazaria
- Ghisolfi
- Tmutarakan
- Hytuk
