= Palazzo della Borsa (Genova) =

Palazzo della Nuova Borsa Valori
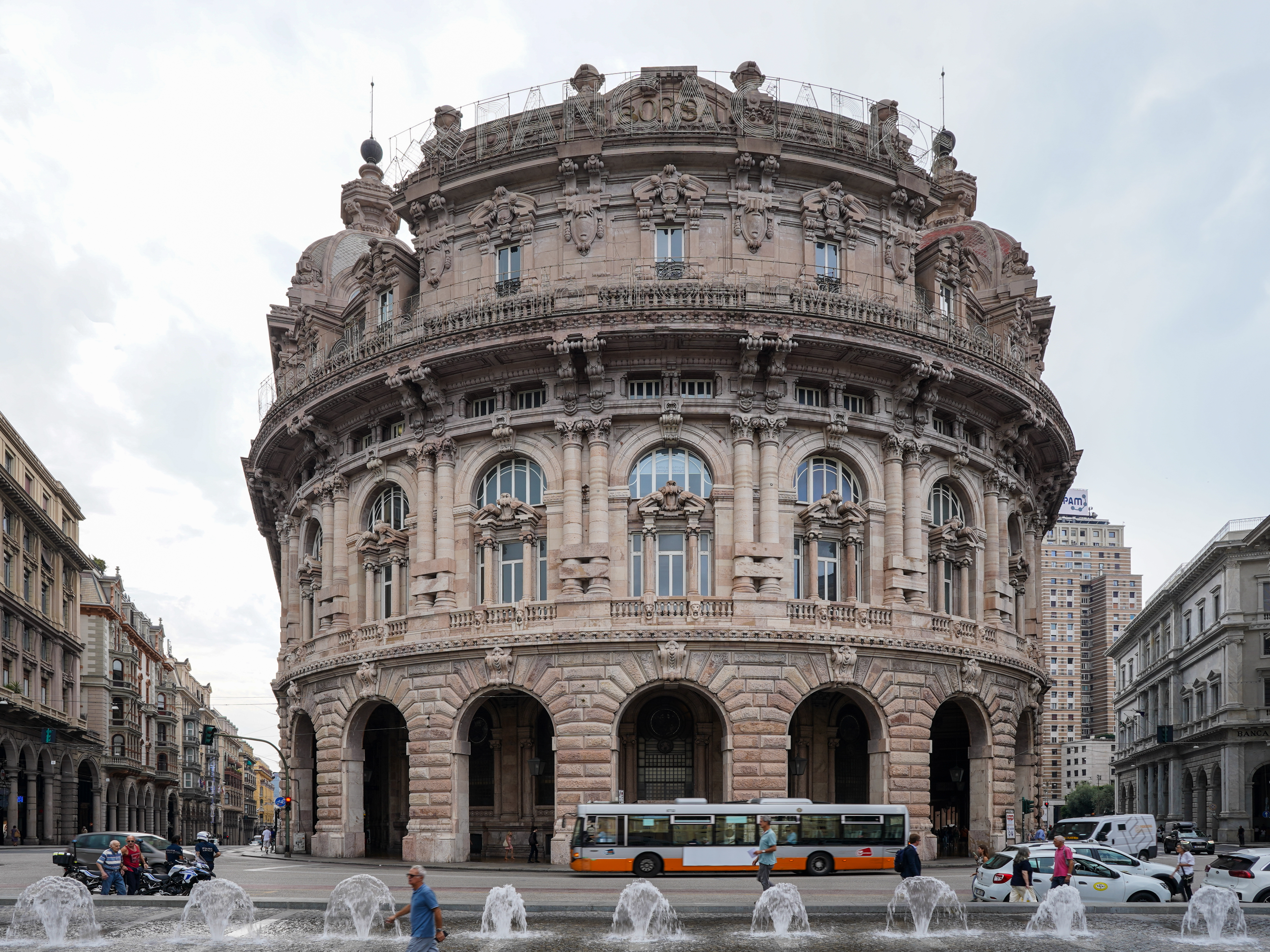
- Facade of the Palazzo della Borsa in Piazza De Ferrari
- Interactive map of the Palazzo della Nuova Borsa Valori area
- Alternative names: Palazzo della Nuova Borsa

General information
- Status: In use
- Type: Palace
- Architectural style: Neoclassical architecture
- Location: Genoa, Italy, Piazza De Ferrari
- Coordinates: 44.40688°N 8.93456°E
- Current tenants: Stock Exchange
- Construction started: 1906
- Completed: 1912

Design and construction
- Architect: Adolfo Coppedè

The Palazzo della Nuova Borsa Valori is a historical building in Genoa, located in Piazza De Ferrari, also known as the Palazzo della Borsa. Built by engineers Dario Carbone and Amedeo Pieragostini, its architecture recalls the Neo-16th century style, while the interiors, by Adolfo Coppedè, are inspired by the Liberty style.

The architecture and decorations were intended to highlight the financial power that the Genoese market, due to its high volume of business, expressed at the beginning of the 20th century, when it was the first Italian stock exchange.

== History ==
=== The stock exchange before the Palazzo della Nuova Borsa ===
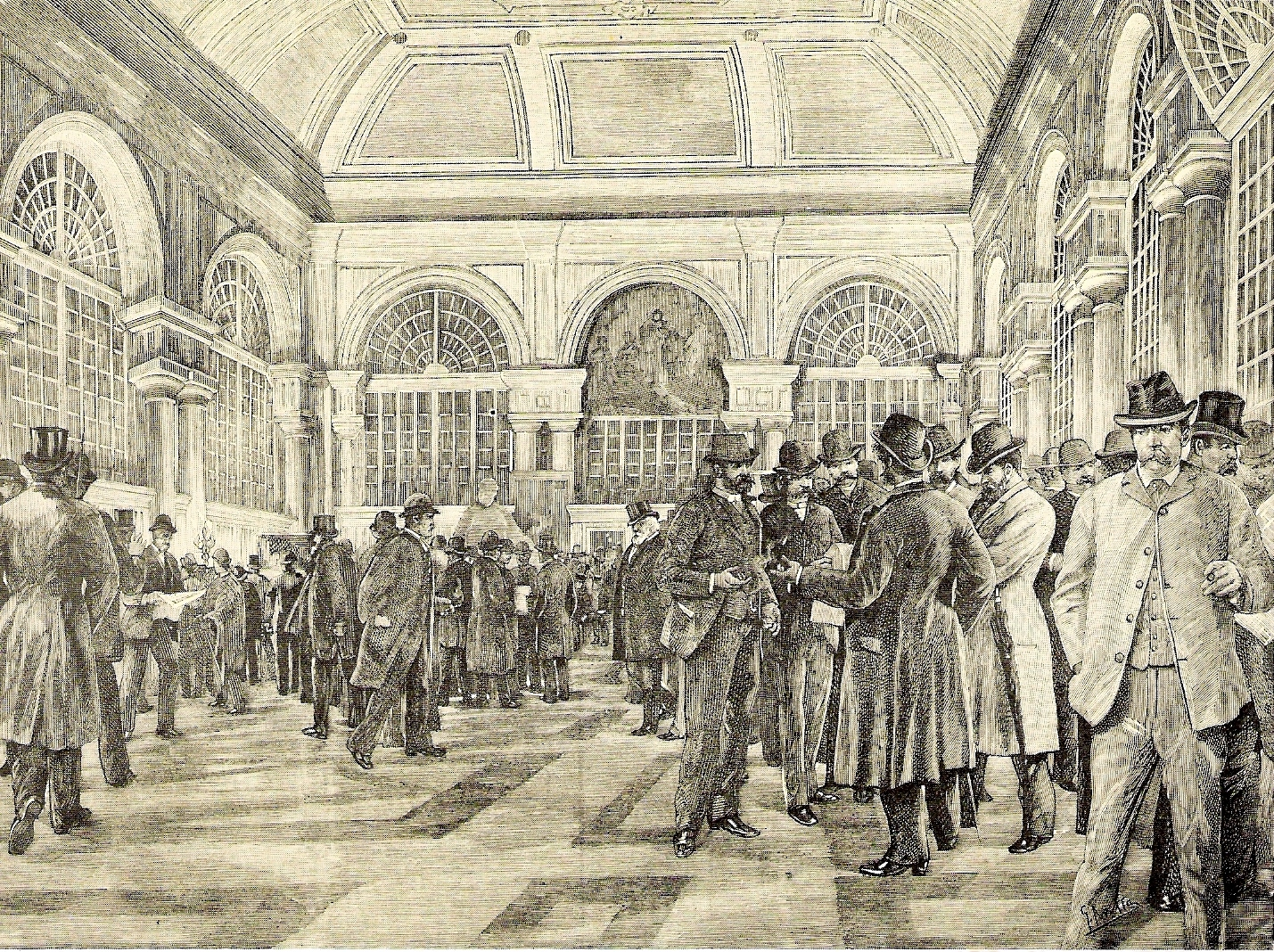
Engraving showing the interior of the loggia in the 19th century

Genoa has an ancient history for the activity of trade. In medieval Italy and the communes, exchanges took place in the Piazza di Banchi, so called because of the benches set up by merchants, notaries, and moneychangers. In the 1700s activity and trading took place in the private scagni, in Palazzo San Giorgio and also in Piazza Banchi. In 1822, a commission was set up by the Chamber of Commerce to fix the exchange rates between Genoa and the most important European trading centres on the basis of the average of bargained prices. The 1840s saw the restoration of the Loggia della Mercanzia (Genova) the building dedicated to stock exchange trading with a first chamber regulation, with 1845 came the first list the Corso dei cambi with the quotations of government bonds and shares. In 1855, the birth of the Commerce Exchange in the Loggia di Banchi and the Palazzo Senarega administered by the Genoa Chamber of Commerce was made official by a decree of Cavour, in which the traders were the matchmakers and authorised stockbrokers, who had a monument to Cavour erected in the Loggia by the sculptor Vincenzo Vela, later destroyed in 1942 by a bombing.

On 27 June 1905 the Nuova Borsa company was founded to build the building, which cost seven million lire at the time. In 1912, the Commodities Exchange remained in the Loggia di Banchi, where it remained until 1985, while the Stock Exchange moved to Piazza De Ferrari, in the newly built building. It was inaugurated on 20 July 1912. It was an event of national importance. During the three days, stockbrokers from all over the country were present and Francesco Saverio Nitti, Minister of Agriculture, Industry and Commerce of the fourth Giolitti government, Francesco Tedesco, Minister of the Treasury and Teobaldo Calissano, Minister of the Post and Telegraphs. Among the other authorities were the marquis Giorgio Doria, representing the mayor Giacomo Grasso, the then president of the chamber of commerce Carlo Dané and Nino Ronco, president of the port consortium and the marquis Giacomo Filippo Durazzo Pallavicini and the president of the stockbrokers' union Giacomo Richini.

=== The design and construction of the palace ===
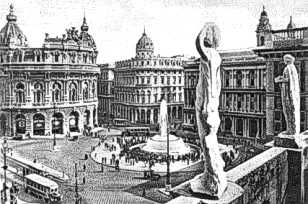
The Palace on Piazza De Ferrari in an early 20th century postcard

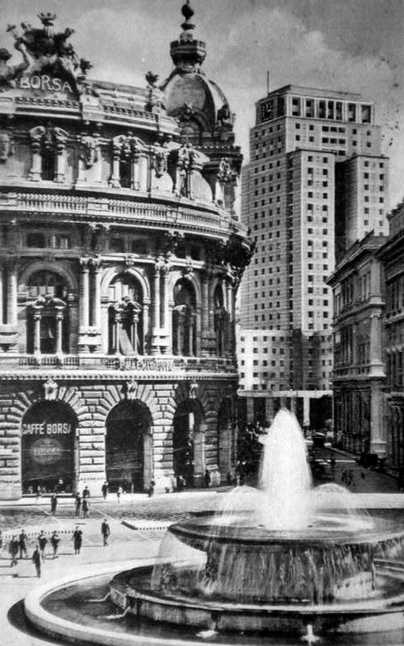
The Palace in the late 1940s

The building of the new stock exchange was designed by Dario Carbone and the interiors by Adolfo Coppedè. The area was bought by the Società Nuova Borsa, at a cost of 2 million lire, in 1906. The building of the palace was contracted to Società Aedes, which used reinforced concrete from the Porcheddu Company of Giovanni Antonio Porcheddu of Turin with the Hennebique system.

In 1910 the entire area underwent major urban redevelopment, which changed its appearance and functions. The old Ponticello district was demolished along with others, as the hill was razed, the convent and church of S. Andrea and the hill street (A Chêullia) were demolished. Via Dante with its palaces, Piazza De Ferrari and Via XX Settembre the new modern city centre were born.

The imposing and monumental facade with rusticated pillars has a rounded and rosy shape in the neo-sixteenth-century style suitable for Carbone to enhance the splendor of the client. The facade is covered in red Verona marble and reddish Filettole stone and towards Piazza De Ferrari it has a gigantic pediment with the inscription Borsa, in golden color like the domes of the building . Instead, it was Adolfo Coppedè who took care of the interior architecture, brother of Gino Coppedè who in Genoa in those years had begun to spread the Liberty style and the so-called Coppedè style which would later arrive in the capital and which would see him as the creator of the citadel of the Genoa International Exhibition of 1914.

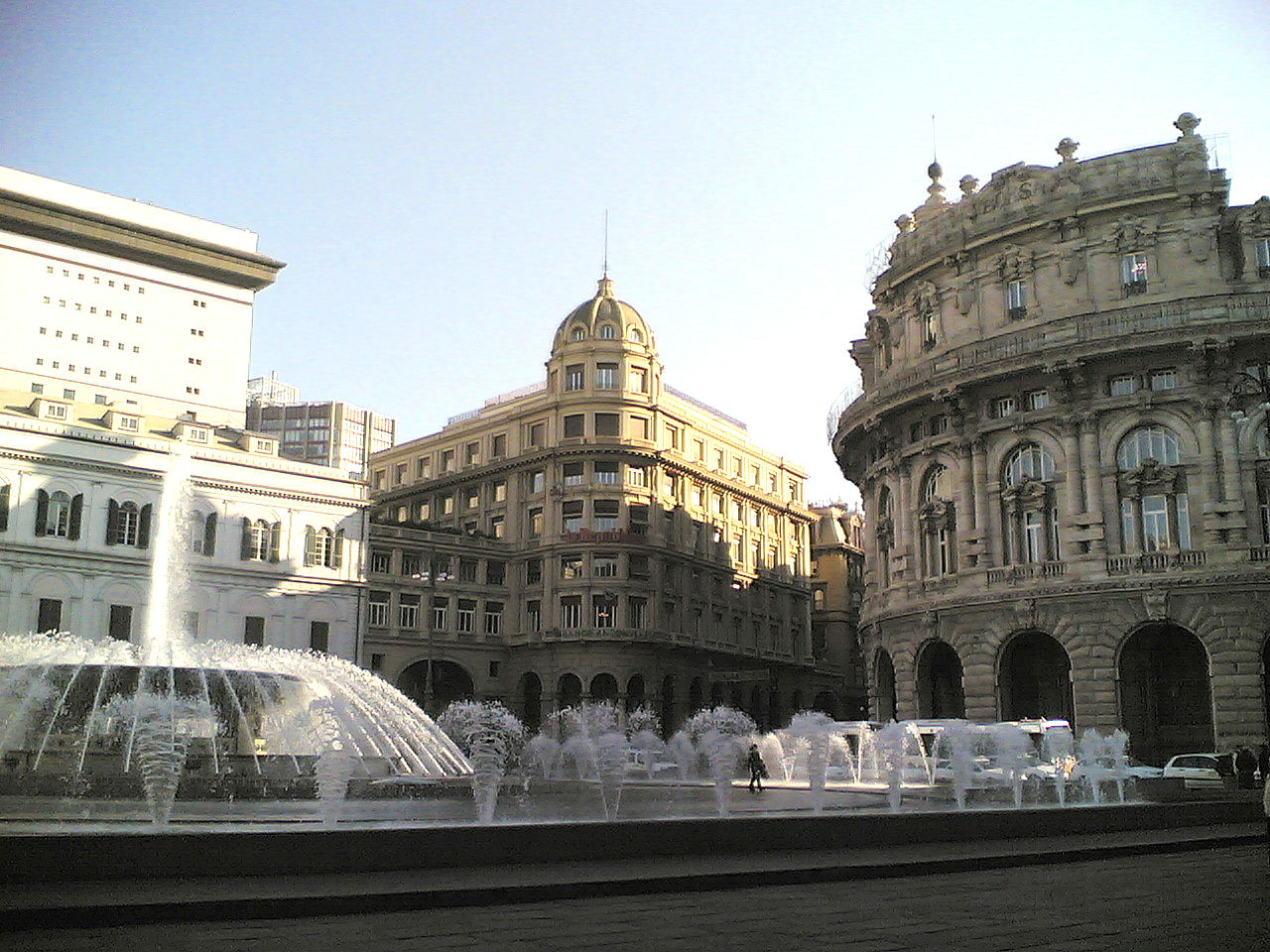
The palace, on the square as it is today

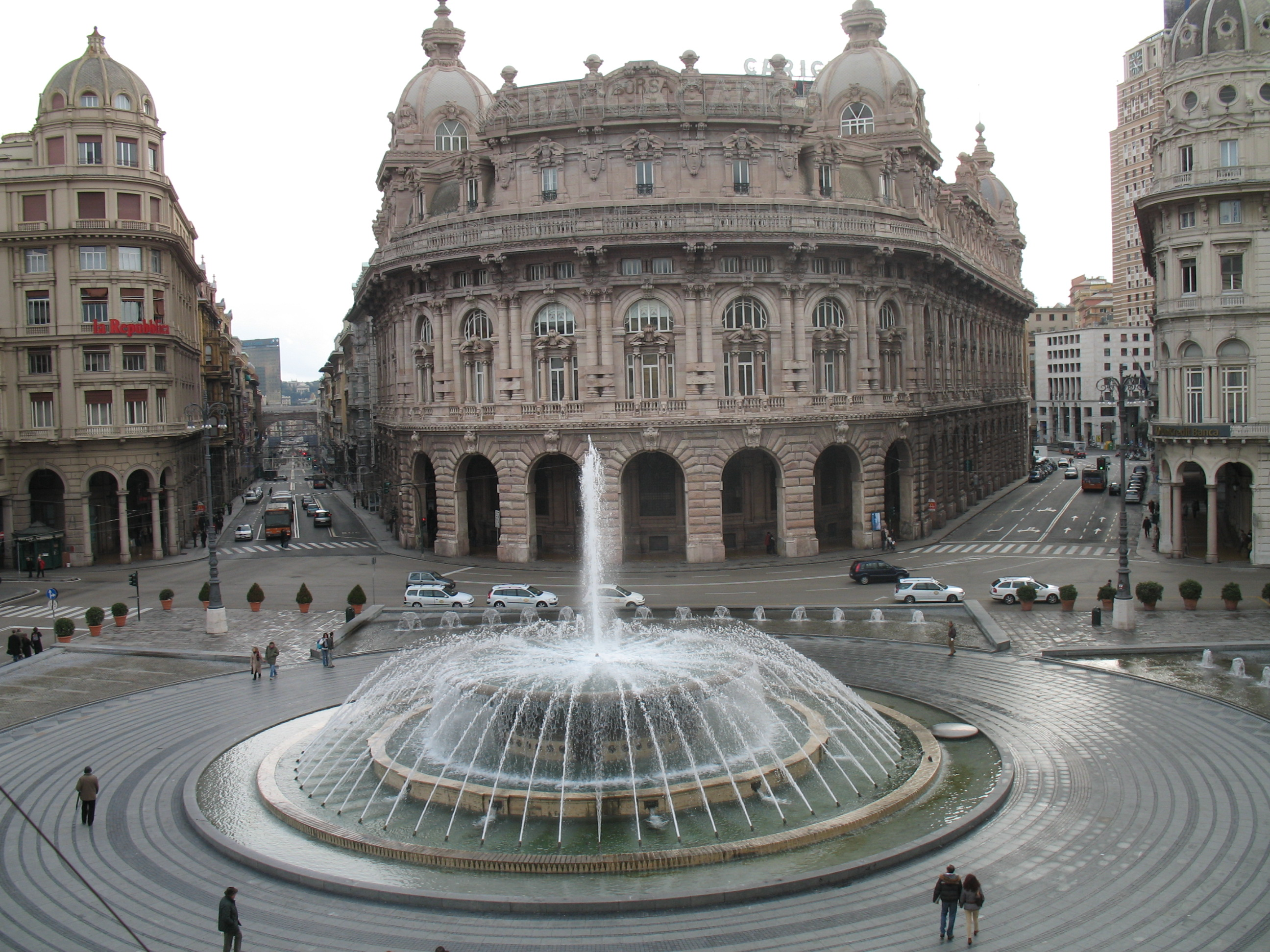
The palace, on the Piazza as it is today

Inside is the 960 m^{2} La sala delle grilla, the largest in Italy at the time it was built, surrounded by thirty-nine scagni for trading by stockbrokers and bankers and by eighteen gigantic bronze candelabra, sixteen remaining today, three meters high and designed by Adolfo Coppedé who wanted them made by the Fonderie del Pignone; in the center Coppedè wanted to create a large hall in the shape of an ellipse with marble columns to support a dome with a skylight on which are the image of St. George and the dragon, a motif taken up on the gigantic wrought iron gate where they are always the same image of St. George and the dragon. The typically Art Nouveau round windows were painted by the Florentine painter Salvino Tafanari.

== From the 90s to today ==
Another room is the Telegraph room where there was a telegraph system and an international telephone service for operators. With the computerization of exchanges and the transition to the telematic system, the Genoese stock exchange saw its last call on 28 February 1994 and the Sala delle Grida closed on 5 September 1998. Subsequently, the Chamber of Commerce of Genoa with the CARIGE Foundation they carried out restoration work.

After the closure of stock market activities, the Sala delle Grida is used as an exhibition space and equipped for holding conferences and exhibitions, as are the scagni. which can be used as exhibition areas, while the Sala del Telegrafo can function as a catering area.

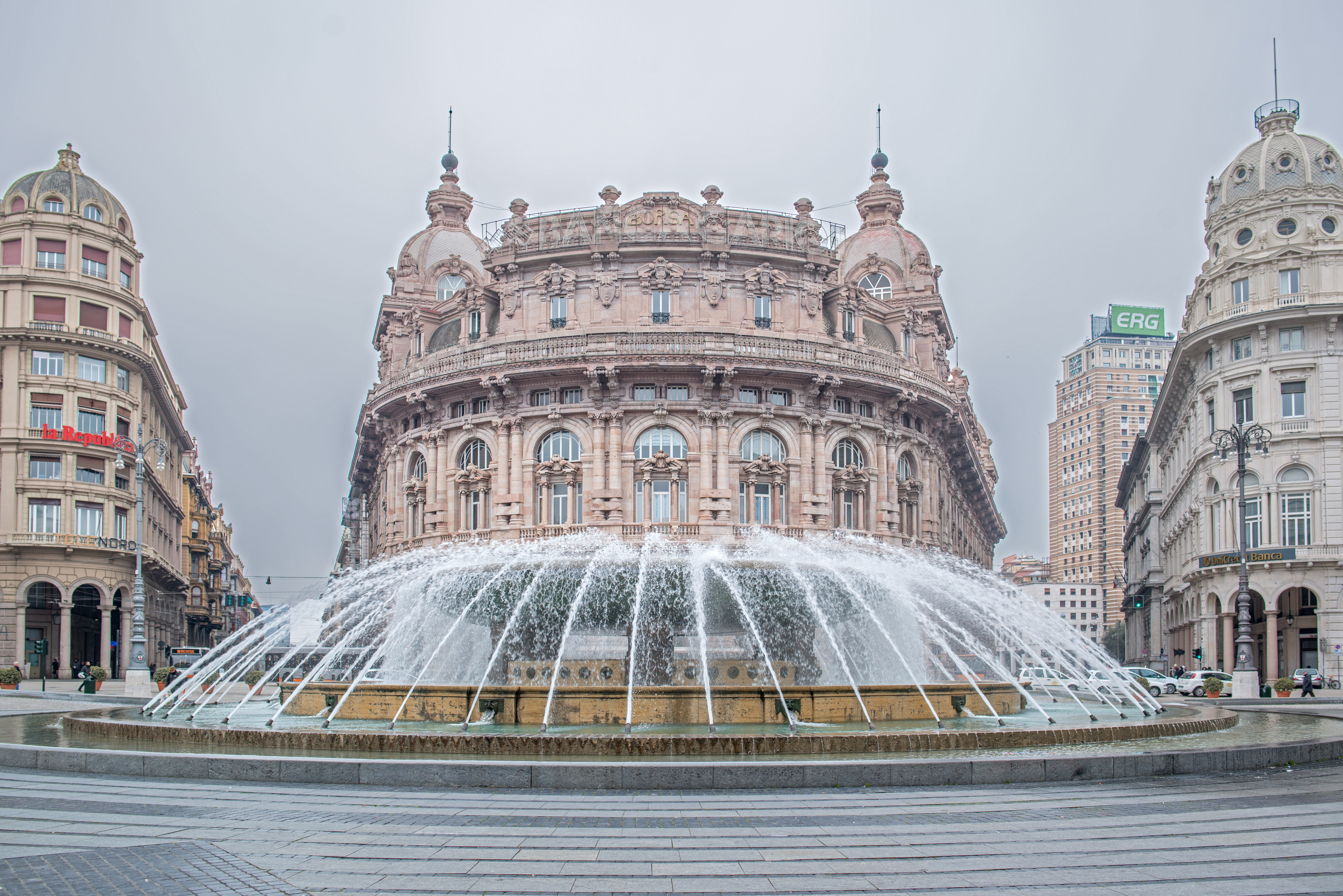

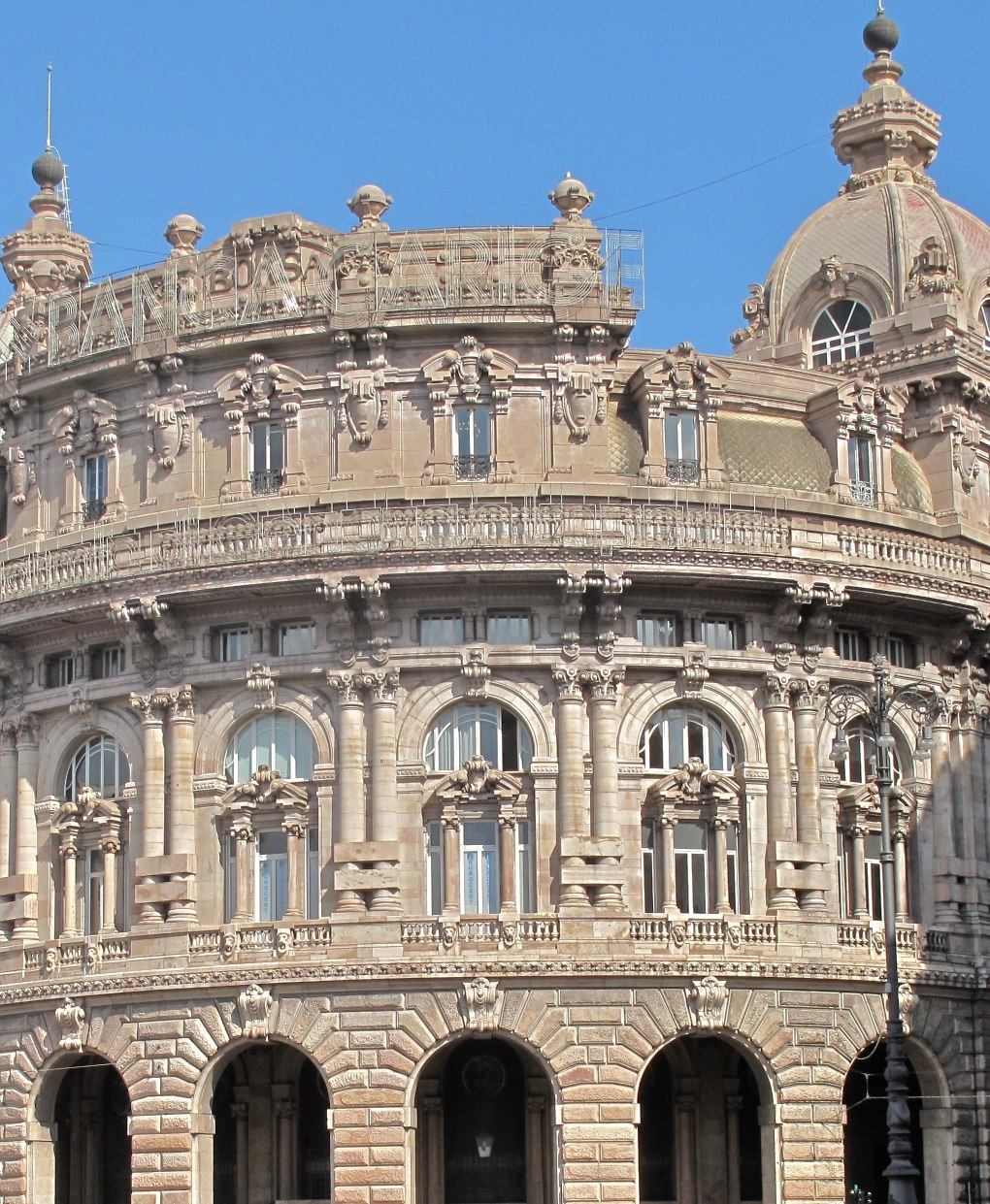

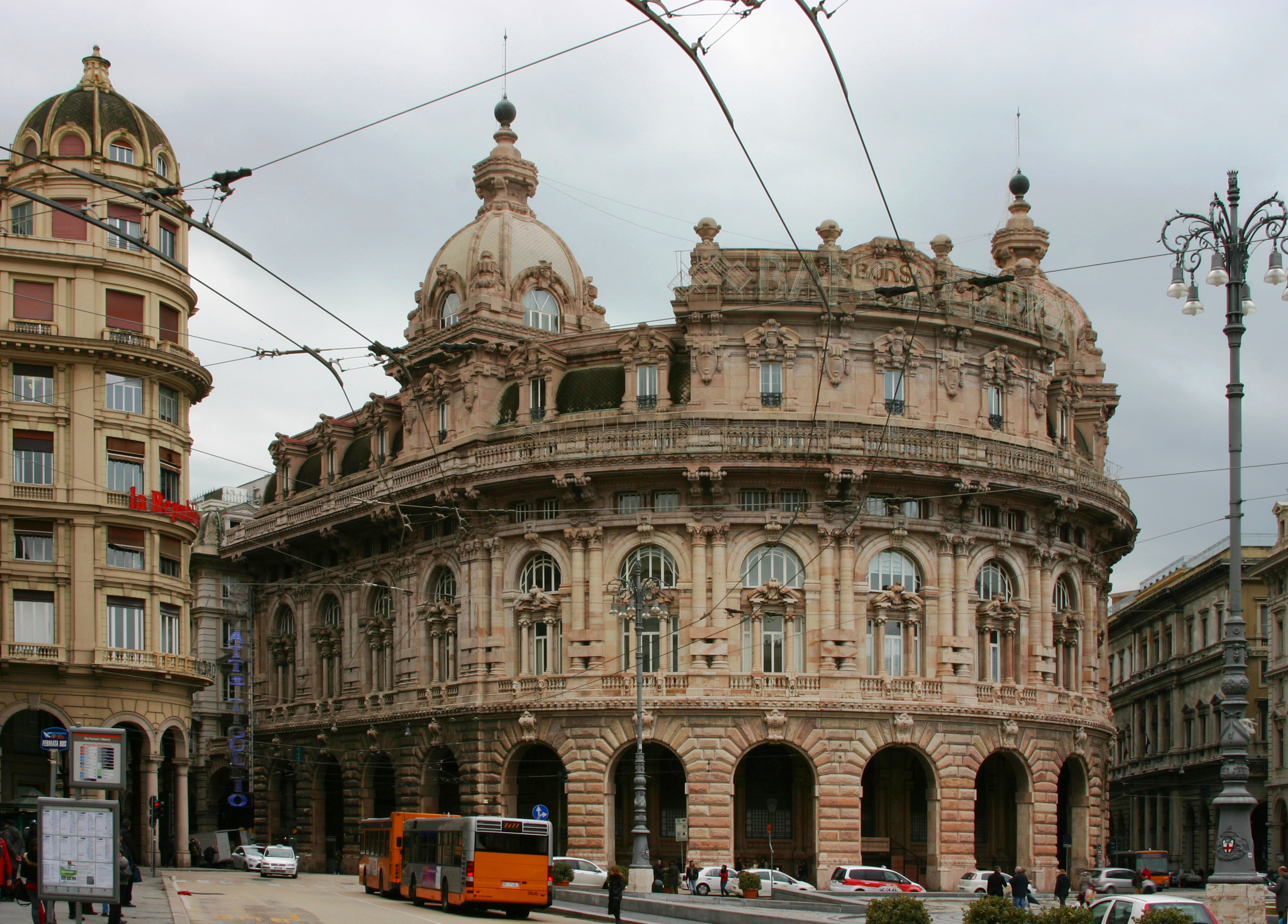

== Bibliography ==
=== Italian sources ===
- W. Piastra, Storia di una strada. Da piazza Ferrari a Ponte Pila, Tolozzi, 1962
- A. M Nicoletti, Via XX Settembre a Genova, Genova, Sagep, 1993.
- A. A. VV., "Dizionario delle strade di Genova", Genova, Tolozzi Editore, 1968.
- A. A.VV. "Genova Nuova", Genova, Baccigaluppi, 1902.
- Comune di Genova, Elenco delle vie e delle piazze prima del 1937.
- Comune di Genova, Elenco strade – circoscrizioni comunali 1977.
- A. M Nicoletti, "Via XX Settembre a Genova", Genova, Sagep, 1993.
- T. Pastorino, "Dizionario delle strade di Genova", 1985.
- A. Pescio, "I nomi delle strade di Genova", Sala Bolognese, A.Forni, 1986.
