= Antoniotto da Cabella =

Consul of the Genoese Republic in Gazaria
- In office 1471–1475
- Preceded by: Battista Giustiniani
- Succeeded by: Position abolished

Personal details
- Born: 1420 Cabella Ligure, Genoese Republic
- Died: 20 November 1475 (aged 54–55) Pera, Ottoman Empire

Antoniotto da Cabella, also known as Antoniotto della Cabella or della Gabella (Italian: Antoniotto da Cabella; 1420 – 20 November 1475) was a Genoese statesman, politician and merchant, the last consul to represent the Genoese Republic in its Crimean colonies.

== Biography ==
A native of Cabella in val Borbera, he moved to Genoa, where he obtained land and a house in Santa Brigida, in the area of Rolli, where he became silkiol. By 1461, he had become one of the leading exponents of the art of silk in Genoa. In 1471, he was given the post of advisor to the Genovese consul in Caffa, a Genoese colony in today's Ukraine, and became consul the following year. He made his journey from Genoa to Caffa itinere terrestri i.e. by land. As soon as he arrived in the Genoese colony, he reported to the Protectors of St George on the situation in the colony amidst the bitter disputes that indirectly involved one of the most important colonies of the Superb. The sultan of the Ottoman Empire Muhammad II in 1475 invaded the Genoese colony of Caffa, was taken prisoner by the Ottoman Empire and brought to Pera formerly a Genoese emporium and European suburb of Istanbul, the capital of the empire. He died in captivity in Pera on 20 November 1475.

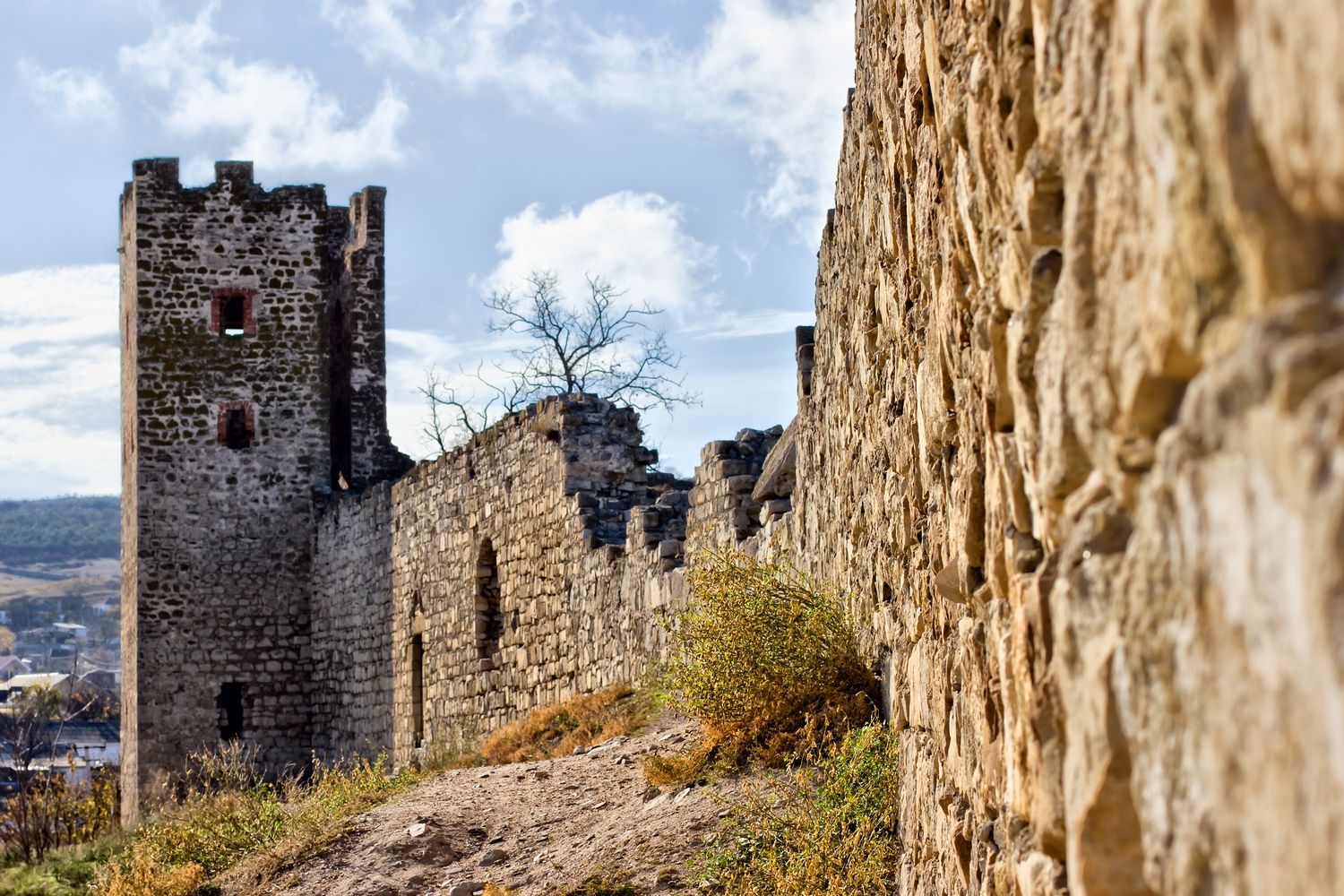
Genovese fortress in Caffa.

== See also ==
- Genoese Gazaria

== Sources ==
=== Italian sources ===
- Antonia Borlandi (1972). "Cabella, Antoniotto". Dizionario Biografico degli Italiani (in Italian). Vol. 15: Buffoli–Caccianemici. Rome: Institute of the Italian Encyclopaedia. ISBN 978-88-12-00032-6.
- Vigna A. Codice diplomatico delle Colonie Tauro-Liguri durante la Signoria dell’Ufficio di S. Giorgio (1453—1475): ASLi. Vol. 2 / A. Vigna. — Genova, 1879. — VII/2. — 1014 p.
- Pistarino, Geo ed., Saggi e Documenti, 6 vol. (Genoa: Civico Istituto Colombiano, 1982–1985).

=== Russian sources ===
- Яровая Е. А. Геральдика генуэзского Крыма. СПб.: Изд-во Государственного Эрмитажа, 2010. 194 с.
- Секиринский С. Очерки истории Сурожа IX—XV веках. — Симферополь, 1955 — С.76–94.
- Колли Л. П. Падение Каффы / Л. П. Колли // ИТУАК. — 1918. — Т. 55. — С. 166.
