= Khozi Kokos =

Russian diplomat

Khozi Kokos (Russian: Хозя Кокос, romanized: Khozya Kokos) is the name given in Russian sources for an advisor to Ivan III of Muscovy. Khozi Kokos was a Jew, probably a native of Caffa in Genoese-occupied Gazaria. His name is likely Turkic; "Khozi" may derive from the word for "pilgrim", and "Kokos" may derive from the Turkic "Kök (or Gök) Koz", or "Blue-Eyed".

Ivan III concluded and maintained throughout his entire reign a very important alliance with Mengli Girai, Khan of the Crimea. The services rendered by Kokos to Ivan may partly explain the latter's favorable attitude toward the Jews. The part played by Kokos as the agent of the grand duke is shown by the instruction given by the latter to his emissary, the boyar Nikita Beklemishev, dated March, 1474.

In this letter Beklemishev is instructed by Ivan to transmit to Kokos his diplomatic credentials to the court of the khan and the regards of the grand duke. Kokos is requested to discontinue the use of the Hebrew language in his further communications to the grand duke, and to use either Russian or Tatar instead.

== See also ==
- History of the Jews in Russia

== Sources ==
- Sbornik Imp. Russ. Istor. Obschestva, xli. 8.
- Singer, Isidore; et al., eds. (1901–1906). The Jewish Encyclopedia. New York: Funk & Wagnalls.
