= Carlo Braccesco =

Italian painter

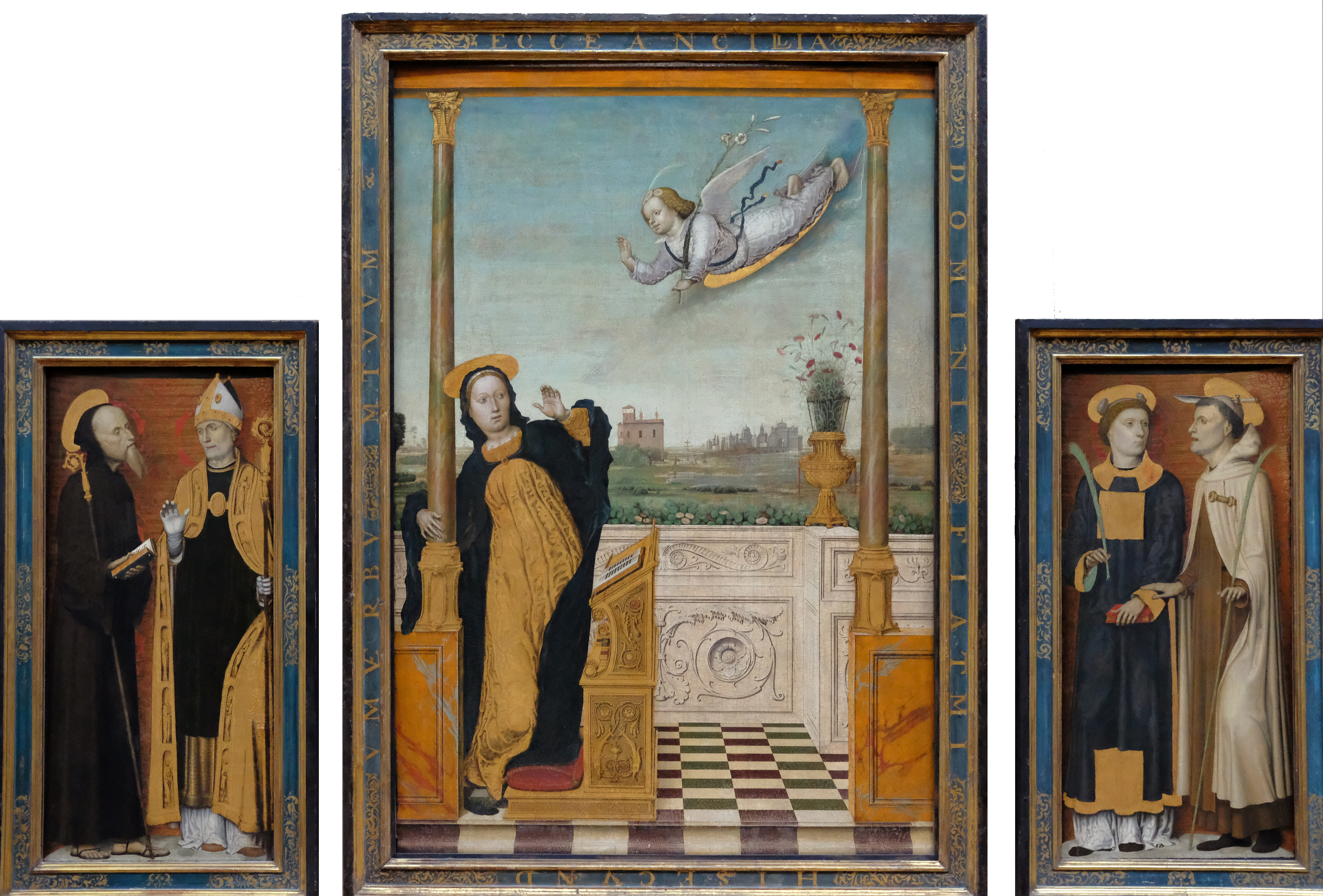
Triptych of the Annunciation, Louvre, Paris.

Carlo Braccesco was an Italian Renaissance painter, documented in Liguria from 1478 to 1501.

His first known work is a Madonna and Saints at Imperia, signed CAROLUS MEDIOLANENSIS ("Carlo from Milan"), dating to 1478. From c. 1480 is a fresco of the Incoronation of the Virgin in the convent of Santa Maria di Castello in Genoa. From 1481 to 1482 he was in the latter city, where he frescoed the façade of the Palazzo San Giorgio, now lost, and also designed the glasses of the St. Sebastian Chapel in the Cathedral of St. Lawrence.

Fragments exist of a Maestà and of a polyptych of St. Andrew in Levanto (1493–1495). His most famous work is a triptych of the Annunciation (c. 1500), colloquially entitled as “Angel Coming in Hot”, which now in the Louvre at Paris, although its attribution has been disputed.

== Sources ==
- Longhi, Roberto (1942). Carlo Braccesco. Milan.
