= Palazzo San Giorgio =

Palace in Genoa, Italy

Palace of Saint George
- Palazzo San Giorgio (Italian)
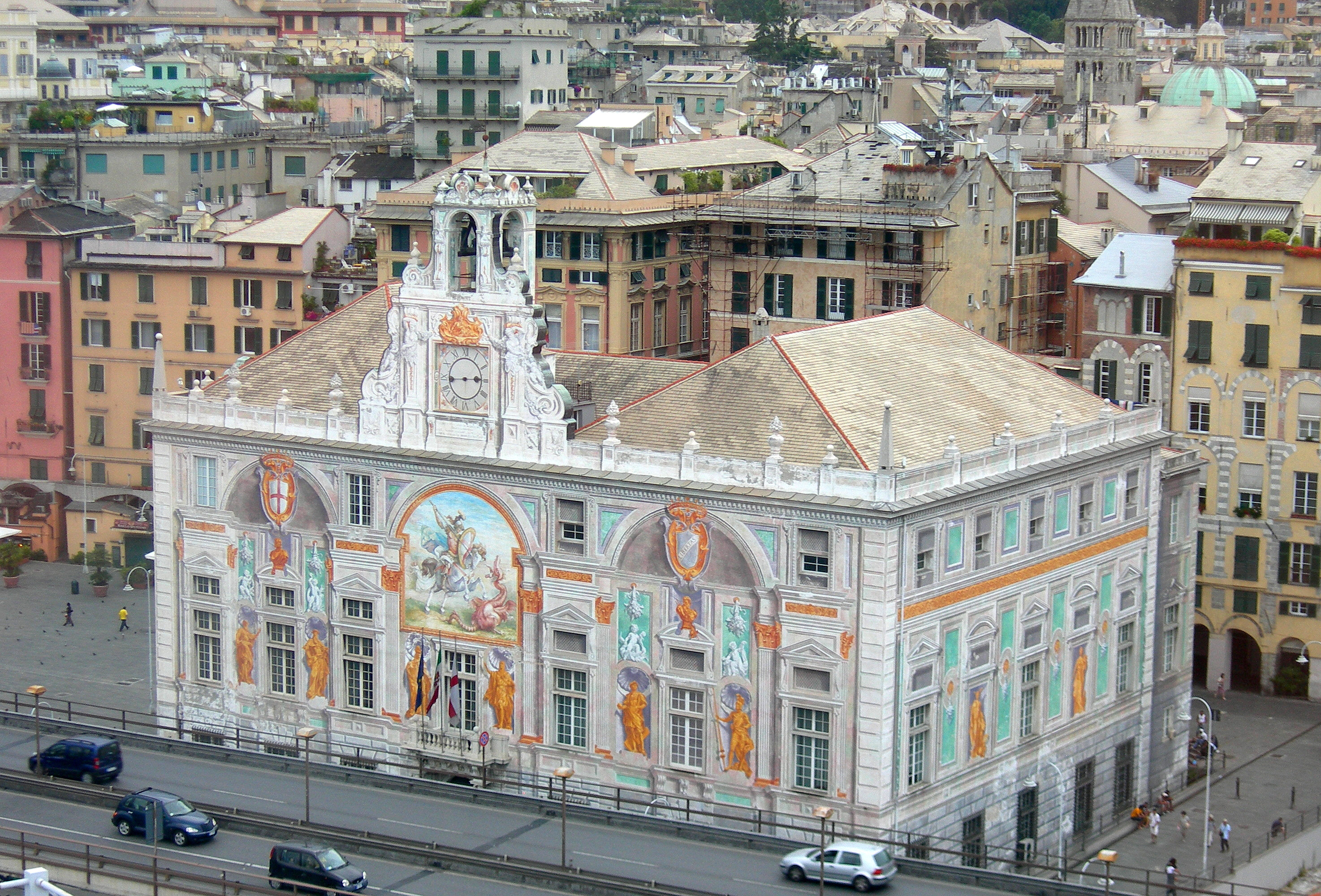
- Palazzo San Giorgio seen from Bigo
- Interactive map of the Palace of Saint George area

General information
- Architectural style: Gothic; Renaissance
- Location: Genoa, Italy
- Coordinates: 44.409167°N 8.928694°E
- Year built: 13th–16th century

Design and construction
- Architect: Friar Oliverio

The Palazzo San Giorgio or Palace of St. George (also known as the Palazzo delle Compere di San Giorgio) is one of the most important and well-known historic buildings in Genoa. It currently houses the headquarters of the Port System Authority of the Western Ligurian Sea.

The palace, included in the Molo district, is made up of two very distinct parts: an older part, a typical example of medieval civil architecture, with the façade facing the Sottoripa portico, and a Renaissance part, facing the sea, in which prospect, overlooking Via della Mercanzia, the short street that connects Piazza Caricamento and Piazza Cavour, near the ancient port, the main entrance portal opens.

Initially called the sea palace because it directly overlooks the port docks, with the sea lapping its foundations, it was built to a design by Cistercian architect and monk Friar Oliverio around the middle of the 13th century as the seat of the Municipality; it then became the seat of customs and in the 15th century it passed to the Bank of Saint George, from which it took its name. Expanded in the 16th century, it was completely restored in the second half of the 19th century by Alfredo d'Andrade after a period of decay; since 1903 it has housed the offices of the Genoese port authority.

== History ==
=== Edification ===
The palace was built between 1257 and 1260 on commission of the capitano del popolo Guglielmo Boccanegra who thus intended to create his own seat for civil power, distinct from that of religious power, established near the Genoa Cathedral.

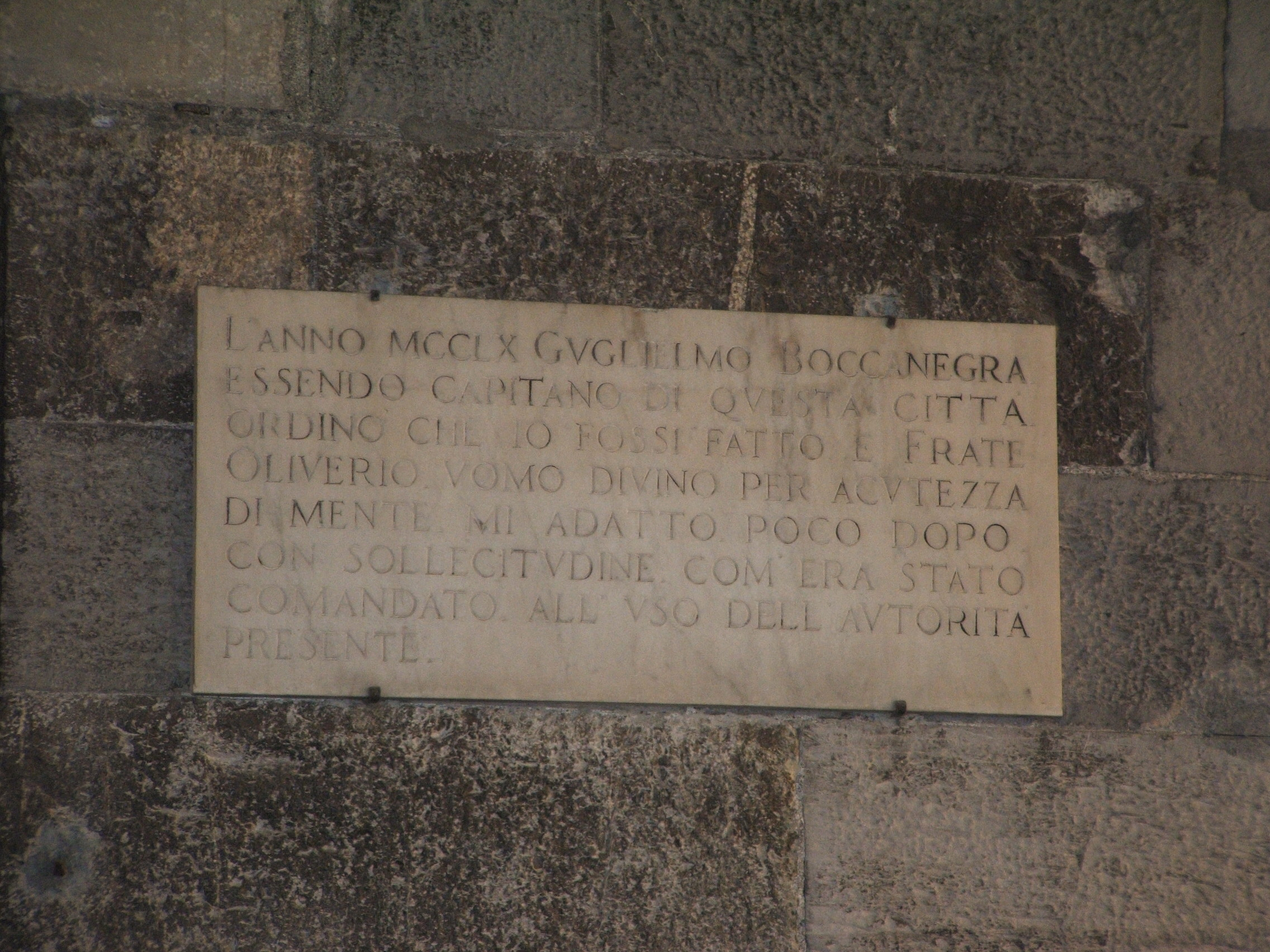
The plaque commemorating the foundation of the Palazzo San Giorgio

The project of the new public building, as recalled by a plaque affixed to the façade facing the city, was entrusted to Friar Oliverio, a monk from the Abbey of Sant'Andrea in Sestri Ponente, who had previously designed the extension to the sea of the Old Pier.

The palace was built in what was then the main landmark of the city, the seaside portico of Sottoripa, which at that time was the economic center of the city. The new palace, located in the center of this portico, was built next to the terminal of the roof of the Soziglia stream, then recently channeled into an underground route under the current via Luccoli, piazza Soziglia, via Orefici, piazza Banchi, via al Ponte Reale.

=== Medieval period ===
The newly built palace was the seat of the Municipality for only two years; in 1262, Boccanegra was deposed and forced into exile in France, where he was appointed governor of Aigues-Mortes by Louis IX, a position he held until upon his death, in 1273 (or 1274). After Boccanegra's fall, the Municipality had a temporary seat for some years, until at the end of the century it settled in the requisite Alberto Fieschi's palace in Serravalle, the building from which the current Doge's Palace developed.

In the second half of the 13th century the palace also housed the prisons in which Marco Polo was held, having fallen prisoner of the Genoese during the Battle of Curzola in 1298. During the period of detention, which lasted almost a year, he dictated to his fellow prisoner Rustichello da Pisa his travel memoirs which were later published as The Travels of Marco Polo.

Starting from 1290, part of the chains of Porto Pisano were placed on the external porticoes of the building.

From 1340 the sea palace became the seat of magistracies for the control of port traffic and the customs and the offices of the so-called "Compere" were established there, bodies responsible for managing the money loans made by citizens to the Municipality. In 1407 all the "Compere" were brought together under a single management: thus the Bank of Saint George was born, one of the first banking institutions born in the Italy of the Municipalities. It administered the public debt and managed the revenues of the taxes, a role it would play until 1797, when the Republic of Genoa fell.

=== 15th to 17th century ===
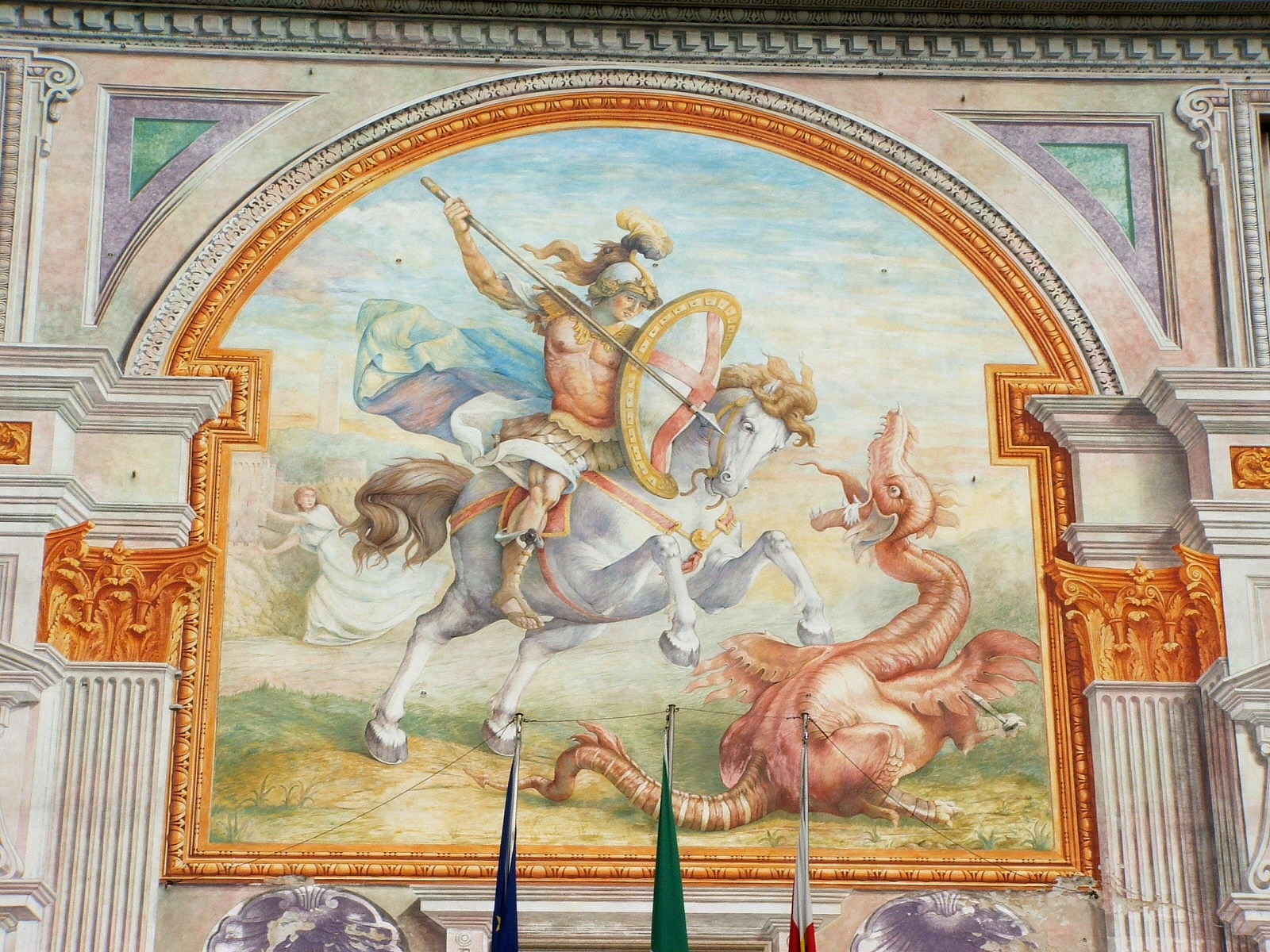
Saint George Killing the Dragon

Starting from 1451, the year in which the entire building passed to the administration of Saint George, taking on its name, the palace was the subject of a series of expansions towards the east. This was an expression of the Bank of Saint George's growing power, which brought the institution to acquire important functions not only in the economic but also political field, such as the administration of Corsica and the dominions of the republic in the two Rivieras.

The palace was restored in 1535, but the most important expansion was that of 1570, when a building was added on the eastern side, adjacent to the existing one, with a monumental façade facing the port, designed to be clearly visible to those who approached Genoa by sea. On this occasion the medieval part was renovated and the statues of the benefactors of the Compere di San Giorgio were placed in the rooms. The Customs offices were located on the ground floor of the new wing, on the first floor the offices and the so-called "sacristies", the vaults in which coins and precious metals were kept; the Bank's archive was located on the second floor.

The facades of the new building were frescoed in 1592 by Andrea Semini, but the Protectors of the Bank, dissatisfied with the work, entrusted a new assignment to Lazzaro Tavarone, who between 1606 and 1608 frescoed the sea front with figures of notables Genoese and in the center Saint George Killing the Dragon.

In the 17th century a clock tower was built in the center of the facade.

=== 19th century ===
The Bank of Saint George ceased its activity with the fall of the independent republic in 1797, and was definitively dissolved in 1805, with the annexation of the Napoleonic Ligurian Republic to the French Empire. The palace, in which the immense archives of the Bank and the customs offices remained, underwent a period of extreme degradation. When in the 1830s it was decided to extend the "Carrettiera Carlo Alberto" (today "via Gramsci") from Piazza Caricamento to Piazza Nuova (today "Piazza Matteotti"), it was also decided to demolish it, however, arousing protests from citizens and intellectuals.

A few decades had to pass before, at the end of the nineteenth century, a complete restoration by the architect Alfredo d'Andrade of the entire oldest part of the palace and the main rooms, including, as d'Andrade himself called it, the Sala del Capitano del Popolo. The architect d'Andrade, superintendent of the Office for the Conservation of Monuments of Liguria and Piedmont, remodeled the entire medieval wing in a largely interpretative manner: some of the buildings added in various periods were eliminated and the original facing was brought to light, freeing it from the plaster that had been added. This restoration work, in harmony with the neo-Gothic taste of the time, highlighted the medieval characteristics of the building, albeit in a somewhat forced way, accentuating the dualism between the ancient seat of the municipality, facing the city, and the Renaissance part of the building, facing the port, the very emblem of the aristocratic republic and its maritime trade. Even the restoration of the most representative internal rooms (Captain's Hall, Hall of the Protectors, Manica Lunga) reflected the taste of the time; these rooms are only hypothetical reconstructions of the medieval palace as they were imagined by D'Andrade.

=== 20th century ===
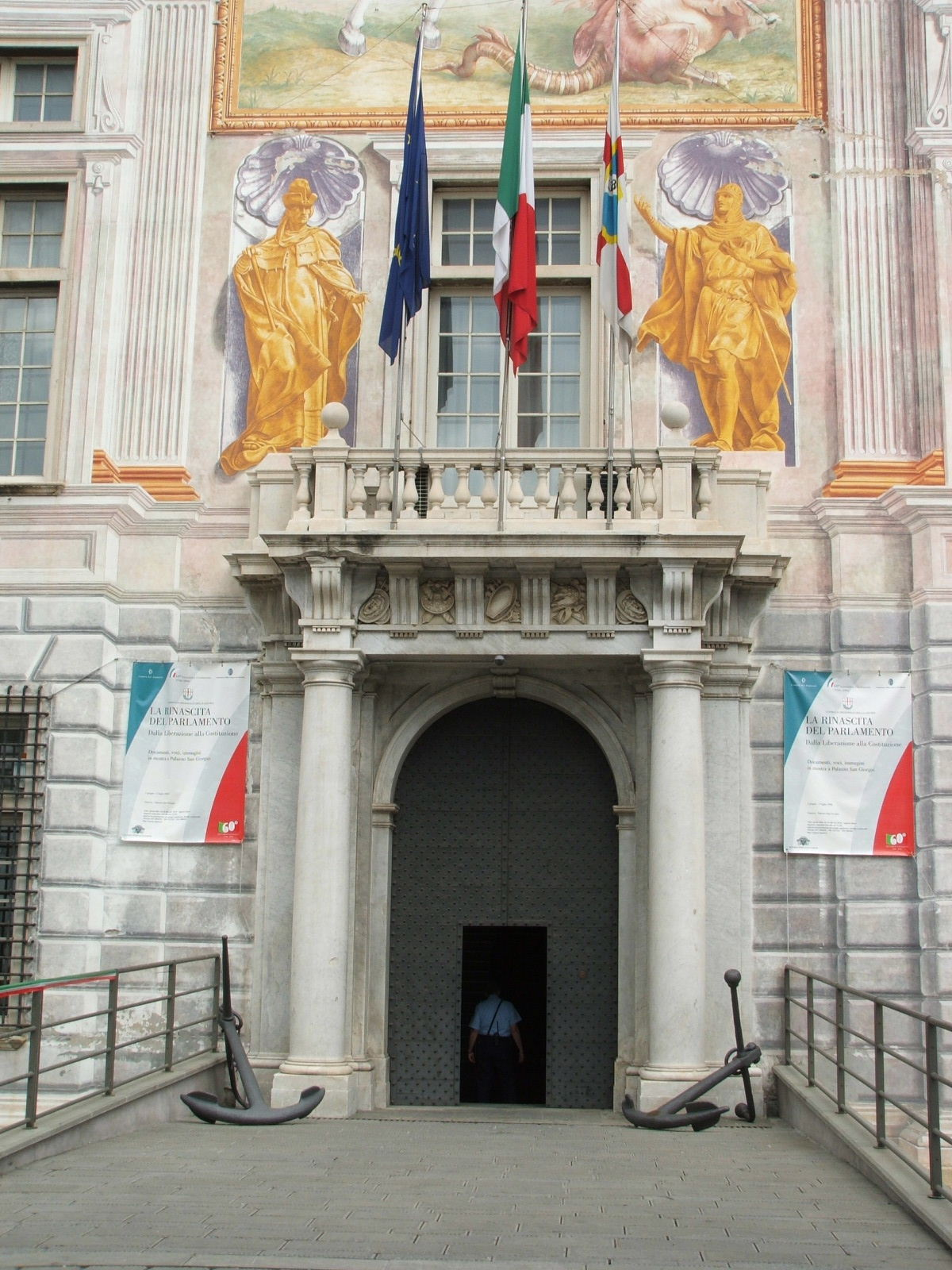
Entrance portal

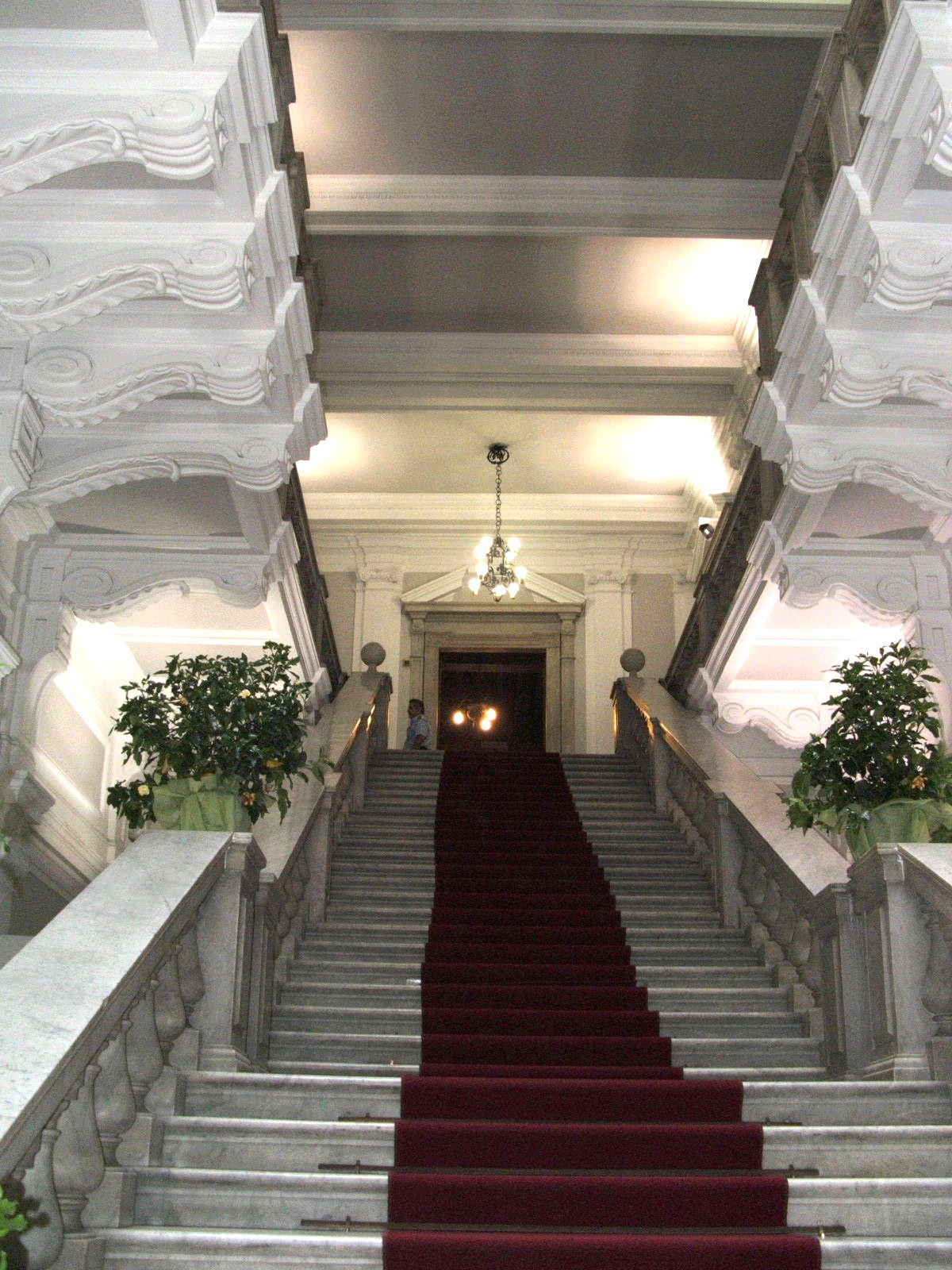
Grand staircase

Initially intended to host exhibitions and cultural events, the palace, after the restoration of the medieval wing, but with the sixteenth-century one still in a poor state of conservation, was assigned in 1903 to the newly established port authority, then called the Autonomous Consortium of the Port of Genoa. This choice was strongly supported by General Stefano Canzio, first president of CAP, with the commitment to continue the restoration work.

After the building was assigned to the CAP, the Renaissance wing was also restored. The fresco on the sea front, by Lazzaro Tavarone, faded and partly disappeared, was redone between 1912 and 1914 by Lodovico Pogliaghi. The Lombard painter, commissioned by D'Andrade, carried out the reconstruction on the basis of what remained visible, the sketches by Tavarone and the large canvas by Paggi, preserved in the library of the palace, which depicted the façade.

At the request of the CAP, the entrance portal on the sea side was opened and a staircase leading to the Sala delle Compere was built internally by the architect Marco Aurelio Crotta. For the opening of the staircase, the ancient "sacristies" of the Banco were sacrificed, but above all the orientation of the building was reversed which with this innovation was, for the first time in its history, related to the port rather than with the city.

The construction of the elevated road, inaugurated in 1965, lightened the traffic on the streets around the building, completely pedestrianized after the construction of the underpass between Piazza Caricamento and Piazza Cavour in the nineties. However, it also created a barrier of notable visual impact between the building itself and the ancient port.

On the occasion of the Colombian celebrations in 1992 for the five hundredth anniversary of the discovery of America, the Superintendence for Artistic and Historical Heritage and the Superintendence for Environmental and Architectural Heritage of Liguria carried out a new restoration of the main façade. Pogliaghi's frescoes had remained in good condition for about thirty years, but they had then deteriorated and in 1985 only a few traces remained.

The recovery, carried out between 1987 and 1989, was entrusted to the painter Raimondo Sirotti, who based on Pogliaghi's sketches (many of which are preserved in the museum dedicated to him in Varese), drawings by D'Andrade, some photos of era and of the few remaining traces, he commissioned the entire renovation to the artist Lorenzo Antognetti who succeeded in reconstructing the drawing according to the original lines and then bringing it back to the facade of the building using the dusting technique.

Since 1995, with the national reform of port authorities, the Autonomous Consortium of the Port of Genoa was replaced by the new port authority which still has its headquarters in the building.

== Description ==
=== Exterior ===
The palace today presents itself in a dual aspect: towards the Ripa portico the thirteenth-century building, in exposed red bricks and stone base, and the sixteenth-century wing extending towards the port, with painted plaster.

==== Eastern elevation ====
The eastern part, overlooking the Sottoripa palace, is the medieval one, dating back to 1260, which we see today in its nineteenth-century renovation; in squared gray Promontorio stone on the ground floor and exposed brick on the upper floors, crowned by Ghibelline battlements, it has a portico at its base formed by five pointed arches supported by four columns and a pillar at each end. The façade, lightened by three-light and four-light windows, is devoid of ornaments: there was once a fresco painted at the end of the 15th century by Carlo Braccesco, known as "Carlo del Mantegna", depicting "Saint George and the Dragon". Of this painting, still well preserved in the eighteenth century, traces still remained before the nineteenth-century restorations, as attested by several authors of the time.

The entrance portal opens through the central arch of the portico, which was the main one of the building until 1912, when the new entrance on the sea side was opened. Above the portal there is a mascaron of a lion figure, and two other small lion heads can be seen on the corners on the sides of the portico; these small sculptures, in Gothic style but with ancient Greek influences, came from the representative palace of the Venetians in Constantinople, known as the Pantocrator, which the Genoese had obtained from the Byzantine emperor Michael VIII Palaiologos for the help given against the Eastern Latin Empire and decided in the Treaty of Nymphaeum. Next to the entrance is the plaque celebrating the foundation of the building.

==== Western elevation ====
The 16th-century wing overlooks Via della Mercanzia, with the façade entirely covered with frescoes by Raimondo Sirotti which reflect those created at the beginning of the 20th century by Ludovico Pogliaghi, who in turn had redone and reinterpreted the originals by Tavarone.

The painted decoration of the facade reproduces a marble cladding with ashlar on the ground floor and pilasters that divide the façade into three sections. In the center of the façade, above the imposing marble entrance portal, stands the polychrome figure depicting Saint George on horseback killing a dragon, a recurring image in numerous portals of the buildings in the historic centre: in the Middle Ages the saint was considered the very symbol of the Republic. The subject was freely interpreted by Sirotti in 1990, all traces of the seventeenth-century original having disappeared. On the sides, from left to right, six bronze-coloured statues are painted inside fake niches, depicting some historical figures of the Republic: the annalist Caffaro, the "Prince" Andrea Doria, the doge Simone Boccanegra (according to some the painting instead depicts the founder of the palace, Guglielmo Boccanegra), the crusader leader Guglielmo Embriaco known as "Maulhead", the navigator Christopher Columbus and finally the admiral Benedetto I Zaccaria.

The decoration is completed by the figures of Janus and Neptune, also in fake bronze, and the coat of arms of the "Conservatori del Mare", the body responsible for governing the port at the time of the Republic of Genoa. The facade culminates with the clock tower.

==== Other prospects ====
The decoration of the remaining facades of the 16th-century wing, in the absence of certain historical information, is based on drawings by D'Andrade and takes up the motifs of the decoration of the facade, with figures inspired by maritime trade and port work. In the eastern part of the 16th-century wing, on Piazza Raibetta, there is a large 18th-century aedicula in marble and stucco, with a statue of the Assumption with two angels in the center, surmounted by a metal canopy.

Along the northern façade overlooking Piazza Caricamento, where in the late Middle Ages the palace was connected to the missing mint building, some columns remain, one of which with a spherocubic capital, which were part of the portico connecting the two buildings.

=== Interior ===
From the entrance located in via della Mercanzia, on the sea front, a large staircase leads to the 16th-century Compere hall, located on the first floor; the hall is surrounded by niches on the walls with statues of the Bank's benefactors. There is also a painting by Domenico Piola depicting the Madonna Queen of Genoa with Saint John the Baptist and Saint George, the coat of arms of Genoa with the symbols of Justice and Fortitude by Francesco De Ferrari (1491), and the emblem of the Bank by Luchino da Milan (1444).

In the Hall of the Protectors there is a fireplace by Giovanni Giacomo Della Porta (1554) and the painting by Paggi depicting the Madonna and Saint George from the end of the 16th century.

The medieval building is characterized by an internal porticoed courtyard with stone columns. In the medieval rooms reconstructed by D'Andrade, in the room called the Manica Lunga room there is a 15th-century bas-relief by Michele D'Aria, with the usual motif of Saint George and the dragon. In the room called the Captain of the People, there are 15th-century statues by benefactors of the Bank, including Michele D'Aria, Tamagnino and Pace Gaggini.

==== Historical archive of the port ====
The historical archive of the port of Genoa, preserved in Palazzo San Giorgio, includes documentation from 1870 to 1945, in particular that relating to the expansion of the port, carried out between 1870 and 1888 and the documents of the Autonomous Port Consortium from 1903 to 1945, largely concerning the construction of the port basin of Sampierdarena in the 1930s.

== See also ==
- Genoese Palace (1314) in Galata, modelled after the 13th century wing of Palazzo San Giorgio

== Sources ==
- Giuseppe Felloni – Guido Laura Genova e la storia della finanza: una serie di primati? 9 November 2004, ISBN 88-87822-16-6
