= Bank of Saint George =

Financial institution of the Republic of Genoa

Bank of Saint George Casa delle compere e dei banchi di San Giorgio
- Type: Bank
- Founded: 1407; 619 years ago
- Defunct: 1805
- Headquarters: Genoa, Republic of Genoa (present day Italy)
- Products: Banking

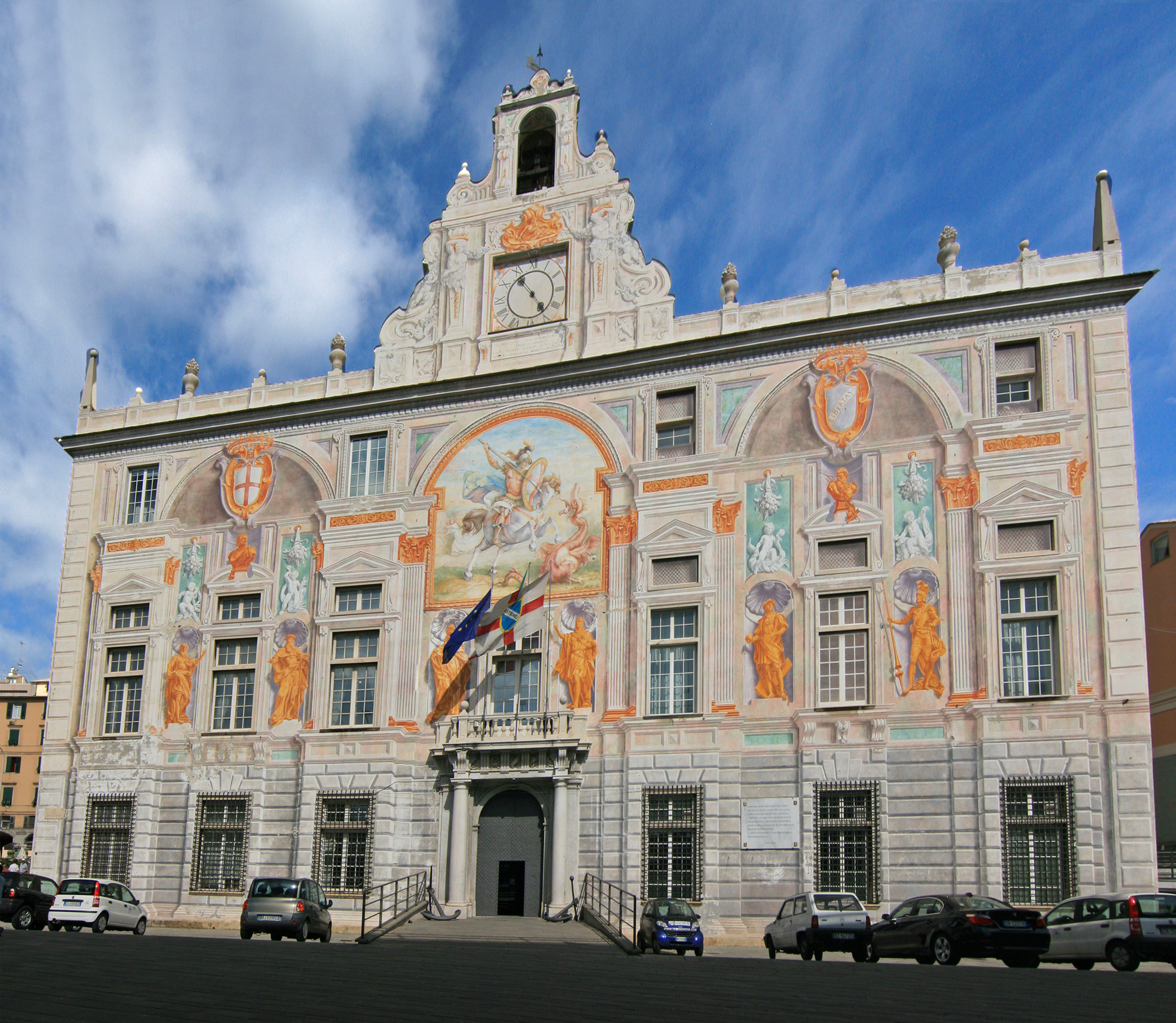
The Palace of Saint George in Genoa.

The Bank of Saint George (Italian: Casa delle compere e dei banchi di San Giorgio or informally as Ufficio di San Giorgio or Banco) was a financial institution of the Republic of Genoa. It was founded on 23 April 1407 to consolidate the public debt, which had been escalating due to the war with Venice for trading and financial dominance. The Bank's primary mission was to facilitate the management of the San Giorgio shares (luoghi). It was one of the oldest chartered banks in Europe and of the world. The Bank's headquarters were at the Palazzo San Giorgio. The Financial Times hailed it as "the world's first modern, public bank", partly due to its innovative character.

== Operations ==
Crimea in the middle of the 15th century; Genoese colonies shown in red.

Its parent, Casa di San Giorgio, administered the Bank and needed frequent liquidity injections to support the war against Venice and Genoa's ailing public finance. By 1445, the Bank suspended operations, focusing on servicing the Genoese state. However, it managed to reopen for business with the general public in 1530. Many of Genoa's overseas territories were governed either directly or indirectly by the Bank. In 1453 the Republic handed over governance of Corsica, Gazaria, and a number of other possessions to Bank officials, though over the course of the fifteenth century, the Republic gradually reclaimed many of its territories from Bank control. The Taman Peninsula remained in the control of the de Ghisolfi family, but the princes of that clan now reported to the Bank.

The Bank lent considerable sums of money to many rulers throughout Europe during the fifteenth and sixteenth centuries, gaining widespread influence. Ferdinand and Isabella maintained accounts there, as did Christopher Columbus. Before leaving for his fourth voyage, Columbus wrote a letter to the Governors of the Bank of St. George, Genoa, dated at Seville, 2 April 1502. He wrote, "Although my body is here my heart is always near you." Charles V was heavily in debt to the Bank during much of his reign. Niccolò Machiavelli wrote in book VIII, chapter XXIX of Florentine Histories (1532):

This establishment presents an instance of what in all the republics, either described or imagined by philosophers, has never been thought of; exhibiting within the same community, and among the same citizens, liberty and tyranny, integrity and corruption, justice and injustice; for this establishment preserves in the city many ancient and venerable customs; and should it happen (as in time it easily may) that the San Giorgio should have possession of the whole city, the republic will become more distinguished than that of Venice.

In 1701, Joseph Addison noticed it during his travels in Italy:

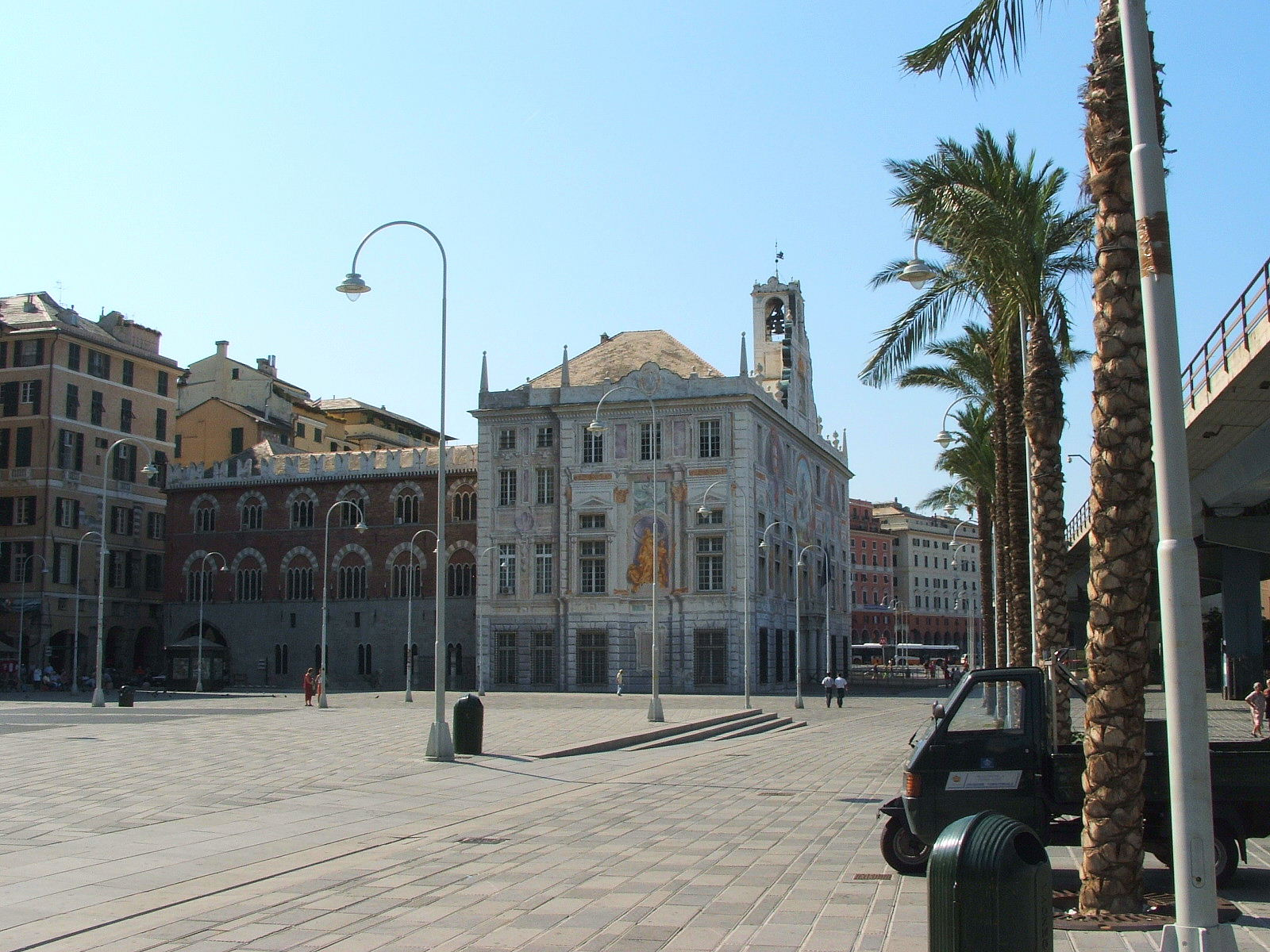
Palazzo San Giorgio, former headquarters of the bank

I know nothing more remarkable in the government of Genoa, than the bank of St. George, made up of such branches of the revenues, as have been set apart and appropriated to the discharging of several sums, that have been borrowed from private persons, during the exigencies of the commonwealth. Whatever inconveniences the state has labored under, they have never entertained a thought of violating the public credit, or of alienating any part of these revenues to other uses, than to what they have been thus assigned. The administration of this bank is for life, and partly in the hands of the chief citizens, which gives them a great authority in the state, and a powerful influence over the common people. This bank is generally thought the greatest load on the Genoese, and the managers of it have been represented as a second kind of senate, that break the uniformity of government, and destroy in some measure the fundamental constitution of the state. It is, however, very certain, that the people reap no small advantages from it, as it distributes the power among more particular members of the republic, and gives the commons a figure: So that it is no small check upon the aristocracy, and may be one reason why the Genoese Senate carries it with greater moderation towards their subjects than the Venetian.

Montesquieu in his The Spirit of Law (1748) discussed the laws relative to the nature of aristocracy (Book II, Chapter III):

It would be a very happy thing in the aristocracy, if by some indirect method the people could be emancipated from their state of annihilation, Thus at Genoa the bank of St. George being administered by the people, gives them a certain influence in the government, from whence their whole prosperity arises.

David Hume mentioned it in his Essays, Moral, Political, and Literary (1758):

Legislators, therefore, ought not to trust the future government of a state entirely to chance, but ought to provide a system of laws to regulate the administration of public affairs. Effects will always correspond to causes; and wise regulations in any commonwealth are the most valuable legacy that can be left to future ages. In the smallest court or office, the stated forms and methods, by which business must be conducted, are found to be a considerable check on the natural depravity of mankind. Why should not the case be the same in public affairs? Can we ascribe the stability and wisdom of the Venetian government, through so many ages, to any thing but the form of government? And is it not easy to point out those defects in the original constitution, which produced the tumultuous governments of Athens and Rome, and ended at last in the ruin of these two famous republics? And so little dependance has this affair on the humours and education of particular men, that one part of the same republic may be wisely conducted, and another weakly, by the same men, merely on account of the difference of the forms and institutions, by which these parts are regulated. Historians inform us that this was actually the case of Genoa. For while the state was always full of sedition, and tumult, and disorder, the bank of St. George, which had become a considerable part of the people, was conducted, for several ages, with the utmost integrity and wisdom.

Thomas Babington Macaulay in his work The History of England (1848) referred to the Bank of Saint George in relation to the establishment of the Bank of England in 1694:

No sooner had banking become a separate and important trade, than men began to discuss with earnestness the question whether it would be expedient to erect a national bank... Two public banks had long been renowned throughout Europe, the Bank of Saint George at Genoa, and the Bank of Amsterdam. The immense wealth which was in the keeping of those establishments, the confidence they inspired, the prosperity which they had created, their stability, tried by panics, by wars, by revolutions and found proof against all, were favourite topics. The Bank of Saint George had nearly completed its third century. It had begun to receive deposits and to make loans before Columbus had crossed the Atlantic, before Gama had turned the Cape, when Christian Emperor was reigning at Constantinople, when a Mahomedan Sultan was reigning at Granada, when Florence was a Republic, when Holland obeyed a hereditary prince. All these things has changed. New continents and new oceans had been discovered. The Turk was at Constantinople: the Castilian was at Granada: Florence had its hereditary Prince: Holland was a Republic: but the Bank of Saint George was still receiving deposits and making loans... Why should not the Bank of London be as great and as durable as the Banks of Genoa and of Amsterdam?

In the seventeenth century, the Bank became heavily involved in maritime trade, and for a time competed with such concerns as the Dutch East India Company and the English East India Company.

After Napoleon invaded Italy, he suppressed independent banks, and this led to the Bank's closure in 1805.

== Headquarters ==
The Bank's headquarters were at the Palazzo San Giorgio, which was built in the 13th century by the order of Guglielmo Boccanegra, uncle of Simone Boccanegra, the first Doge of Genoa. On 11 June 1857 the ancient lock from the vault of the bank of St George was presented to the Philadelphia historical society by Lieutenant George H. Hare USN.

== See also ==
- Banco di San Giorgio (1987–2012), an unrelated bank that existed from 1987 to 2012
- List of central banks
- List of banks in Italy

== Sources ==
- Gevurtz, Franklin A. (2004). The Historical and Political Origins of the Corporate Board of Directors. Berkeley, California: The Berkeley Electronic Press.
- Kirk, Thomas A. (2005). Genoa and the Sea: Policy and Power in an Early Modern Maritime Republic, 1559-1684. The Johns Hopkins University Studies in Historical and Political Science. Baltimore, Maryland: Johns Hopkins University Press. ISBN 0-8018-8083-1.
- Tai, Emily (2004). "Restitution and the Definition of a Pirate: The Case of Sologrus de Nigro". Mediterranean Historical Review. 19 (2): 34–70. doi:10.1080/0951896052000336436. S2CID 159856849.
- Felloni, Giuseppe; Laura, Guido (2017). Genoa and the history of finance: A series of firsts? (4th ed.). Genova: Riccardo Campanella Begliomini Editore. ISBN 978-88-942327-0-7.
