= Genoese Gazaria =

Genoese colony in the Black sea

Gazaria
- Colony of Republic of Genoa
- 1266–1475
- Flag Coat of arms

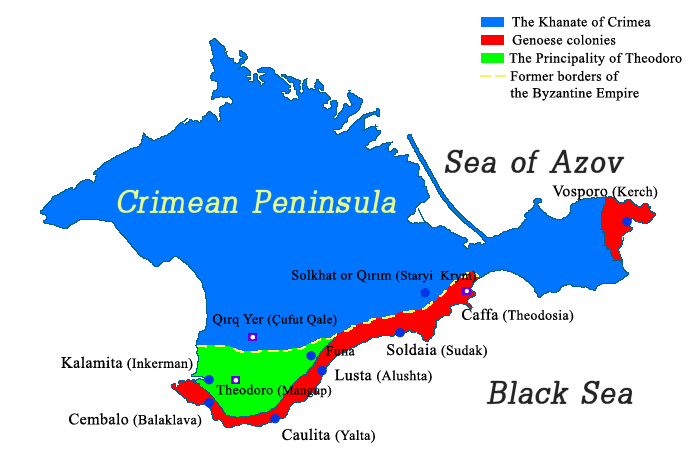
- Gazarian colonies of the Republic of Genoa in Crimea in red; excludes the Gazarian colonies in present-day Ukraine, Bulgaria, and Romania.
- Capital: Caffa
- Area
  - Coordinates: 45°2′N 35°22′E
- Government
- Consul
  - 1266: Alberto Spinola (first)
  - 1471–1475: Antoniotto da Cabella (last)
- History
  - Transfer of Caffa from Golden Horde: 1266
  - Conquest by the Ottoman forces: 1475
Preceded by	Succeeded by
Principality of Theodoro; Golden Horde	Ottoman Empire
- Today part of: Russia; Ukraine; Romania

Gazaria (also Cassaria, Cacsarea, and Gasaria) was the colonial possessions of the Republic of Genoa in Crimea and around the Black Sea coasts in the territories of the modern regions of Russia, Ukraine and Romania, from the mid-13th century to the late 15th century. The Genoese rule was represented by a consul, and the capital of the Gazaria was the city of Kaffa (present-day Feodosia) in the Crimean peninsula.

The name Gazaria derives from Khazaria, though the Khazars had ceased to rule over the area well before the Genoese arrived.

== History ==
The political premise of the establishment of the Gazaria colonies had been the Treaty of Nymphaeum of 1261, with which the Emperor of Nicaea granted the Genoese the exclusive right to trade in the "Mare Maius" (Black Sea). Consequently, in 1266, Caffa was granted to the Genoese, which became the capital of the dominions of Gazaria.

In 1308, the Mongols of the Golden Horde, commanded by the khan Toqta, conquered Caffa after a lengthy siege. Five years later, the Genoese managed to regain their colony from Toqtai's successor, Öz Beg Khan. In 1313, having regained possession of the city, the Republic organized the administration of the colony in a more structured way. Legislative power was attributed to the "Officium Gazarie", made up of eight magistrates who remained in office for six months and appointed their successors. Executive power was entrusted to the Consul of Caffa, serving for one year, assisted by a scribe or chancellor, both appointed by the Genoese government. The elected council of 24 members, also serving for one year, was made up of half nobles and half merchants or artisans. Of the latter, four could be local inhabitants who had obtained Genoese citizenship. Finally, the council elected a restricted council of six members external to the council of 24. The other cities of the colony had similar administrations, subordinate to that of Caffa.

In 1341, the laws in force in the Genoese Gazaria were collected in the "Liber Gazarie", now kept in the State Archives of Genoa. The collection was subsequently updated in 1441 with the name"Statuta Gazarie".

In 1347, the Golden Horde, this time led by Jani Beg, again besieged Caffa. An anonymous chronicle tells that the besiegers would launch the corpses of the dead defenders inside the city walls with catapults. These defenders had died of a disease that was spreading from the East, the Black Death. The inhabitants of Caffa would throw the bodies into the sea as soon as they could, but the plague spread regardless. Once in Caffa, the plague was introduced into the vast commercial network of the Genoese, which extended throughout the Mediterranean. On board the commercial ships that departed from Caffa in the autumn of 1347, the plague reached Constantinople, the first European city infected, and later arrived in Messina and spread throughout Europe.

Gazaria's tax revenues had been assigned to the "compera di Gazaria", the association of state creditors that had advanced the expenses for the defence of the colony. In fact, the "compera" belonged to the Bank of Saint George, which therefore managed the taxation of Gazaria.

After the Fall of Constantinople in 1453, the Republic ceded the sovereignty over Gazaria to the Bank of Saint George, believing that it was the only entity capable of organizing resistance against the Turks. However, these domains were conquered by the Ottoman Empire in 1474.

== Colonies ==
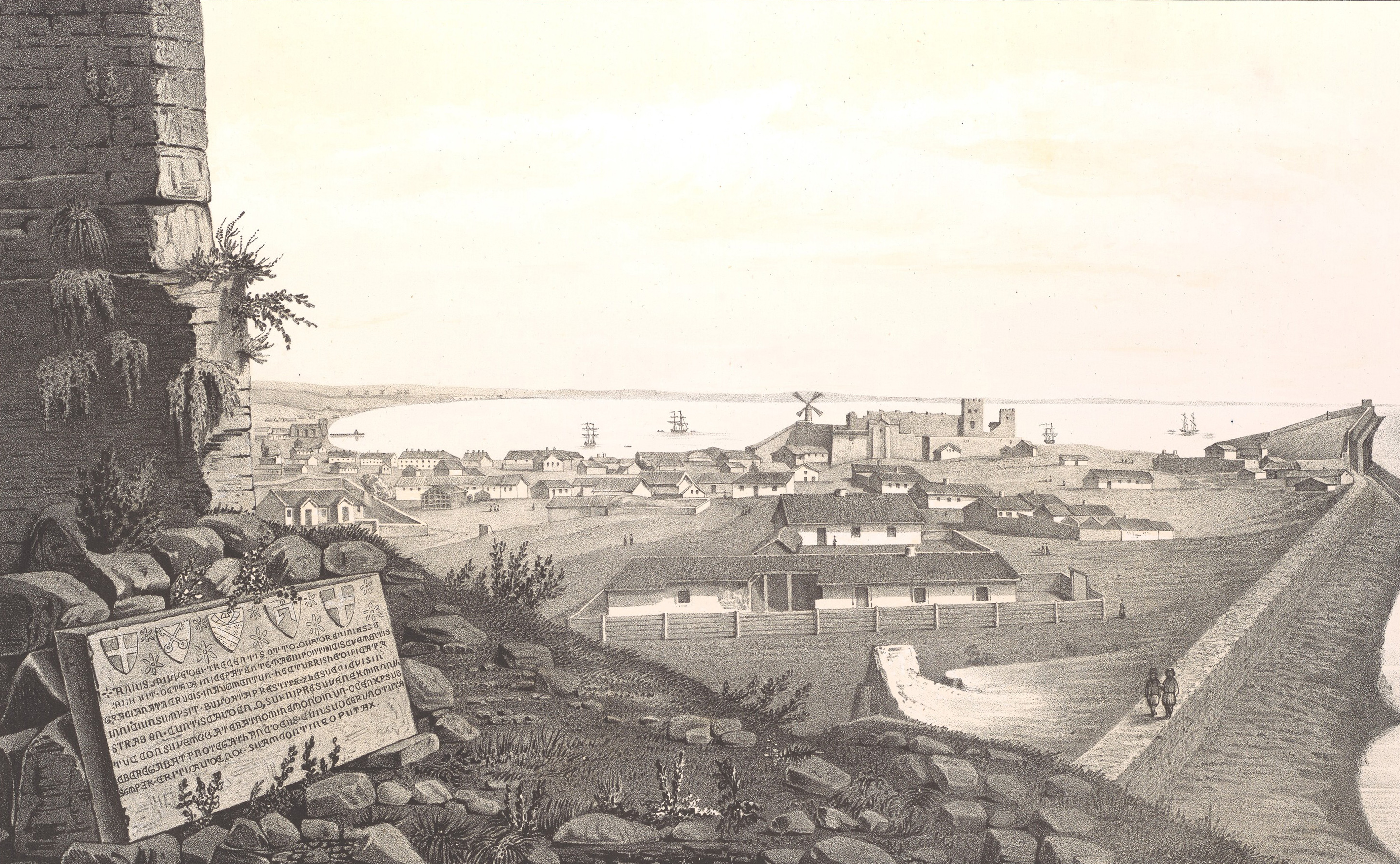
Feodosia, 1830s. On the left is a bookmarked plate with the heraldry of the Genoese nobility, the coats of arms of the first Genoese (surnames) trading houses on the Black Sea coast

=== Crimea ===
- Caffa
- Cembalo
- Soldaia
- Vosporo
- Sarsona
- Capitanatu Gotia (territory of Theodoro)

=== West Black Sea (Ukraine and Romania) ===
Aside from Crimea, Genoa possessed several castles on the western coast of Black Sea such as the castle of Maurocastro (Bilhorod-Dnistrovsky) in the estuary of Dniester, the castle of Ginestra near Odessa, the castle of Licostomo (Kiliya), the colony of Costanza (Constanța) and the colony of Caladda (Galați).

=== Taman peninsula and Tanais (Russia) ===
- Tana (Azov)
- Matrega (Tmutarakan)
- Copa (Slavyansk-na-Kubani)
- Mapa (Anapa)
- Batario (Novorossiysk)
- Costa and Layso (Sochi)

=== Abkhazia (Georgia) ===
- Chacari (Gagra)
- Santa Sophia (Alakhadzi)
- Pesonqa (Pitsunda)
- Cavo di Buxo (Gudauta)
- Niocoxia (New Athos)
- Sebastopolis (Sokhumi)

=== Ajara (Georgia) ===
- Lo Bati (Batumi)
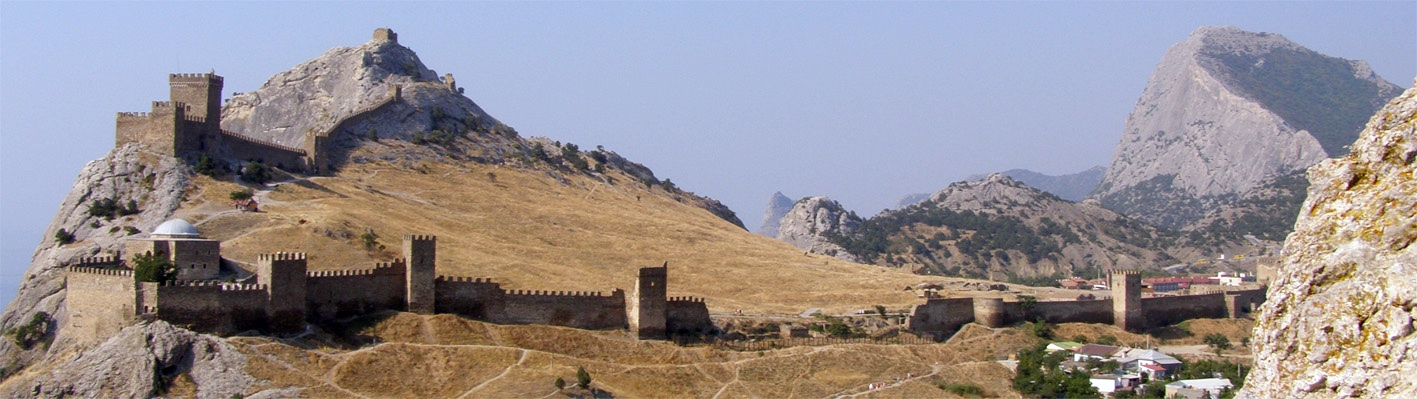
Panorama of Soldaia Castle near Sudak

== See also ==
- Treaty of Nymphaeum (1261)
- Гавриленко О. А., Сівальньов О. М., Цибулькін В. В. Генуезька спадщина на теренах України; етнодержавознавчий вимір. — Харків: Точка, 2017.— 260 с. — ISBN 978-617-669-209-6
