= List of geographical spits =

There are many examples of spits around the world. Some of which include:

== By sea ==
=== Azov Sea ===
Russia

- Achuevsk Spit
- Beglitsk Spit
- Chushka Spit
- Dolgaya Spit
- Glafirovsk Spit
- Kamyshevatsk Spit
- Petrushino Spit
- Sazalniksk Spit
- Yasensk Spit
- Yeysk Spit

Ukraine

- Belosaraysk Spit
- Berdyansk Spit
- Fedotova Spit
- Krivaya Spit
- Obytichna Spit
- Arabat Spit
- Tuzla Spit

=== Baltic Sea ===
- Curonian Spit, Russia/Lithuania
- Hel Spit, Poland
- Priwall, Germany
- Vistula Spit, Poland/Russia

=== Skagerrak ===
- Grenen, Denmark

== By country ==
=== Australia ===
- Lefevre Peninsula, Adelaide, South Australia
- Letitia Spit, Fingal Head, New South Wales
- Sir Richard Peninsula, Goolwa, South Australia
- Southport Spit, Gold Coast, Queensland
- Tobias Spit, 1 km northeast of High Island, Frankland Islands, Queensland
- Younghusband Peninsula, Coorong, South Australia

=== Brunei ===
- Seri Kenangan Beach, Pekan Tutong, Tutong
- Pelumpong Spit, Serasa, Brunei-Muara
- Serasa Beach, Serasa, Brunei-Muara

=== Canada ===
- Toronto Islands (former spit, now detached), Toronto, Ontario
- Leslie Street Spit, man-made spit created as part of new harbour project
- Long Point, Ontario
- Point Pelee, Ontario on Lake Erie
- Rondeau Provincial Park - a crescentric sand spit on Lake Erie
- Blackie Spit (east section of the Crescent Beach), South Surrey, British Columbia
- Sidney Spit, Sidney Island, British Columbia
- La Dune de Bouctouche, Bouctouche, New Brunswick
- Whiffen Spit, Sooke, British Columbia
- West Pen Island, Nunavut

=== China ===
==== Hong Kong ====
- Central ferry pier
- Discovery bay
- Pui O, Lantau
- Stanley
- Tsim Sha Tsui before infilling

=== Croatia ===
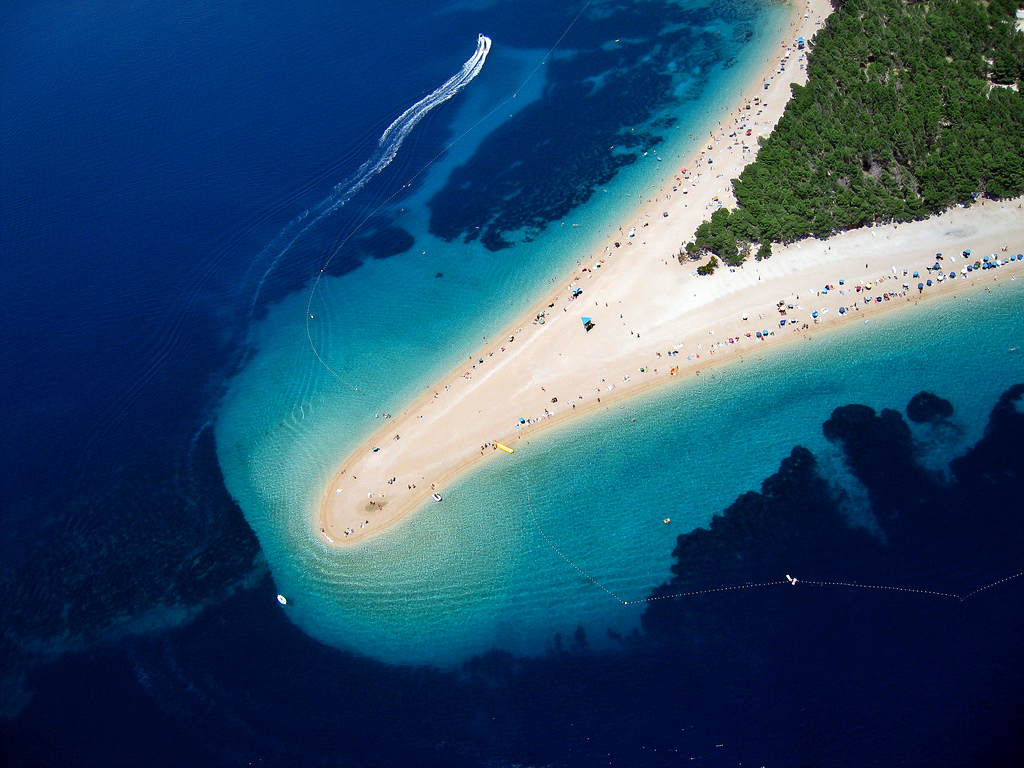
Zlatni Rat, Croatia

- Zlatni Rat, on island Brač

=== Denmark ===
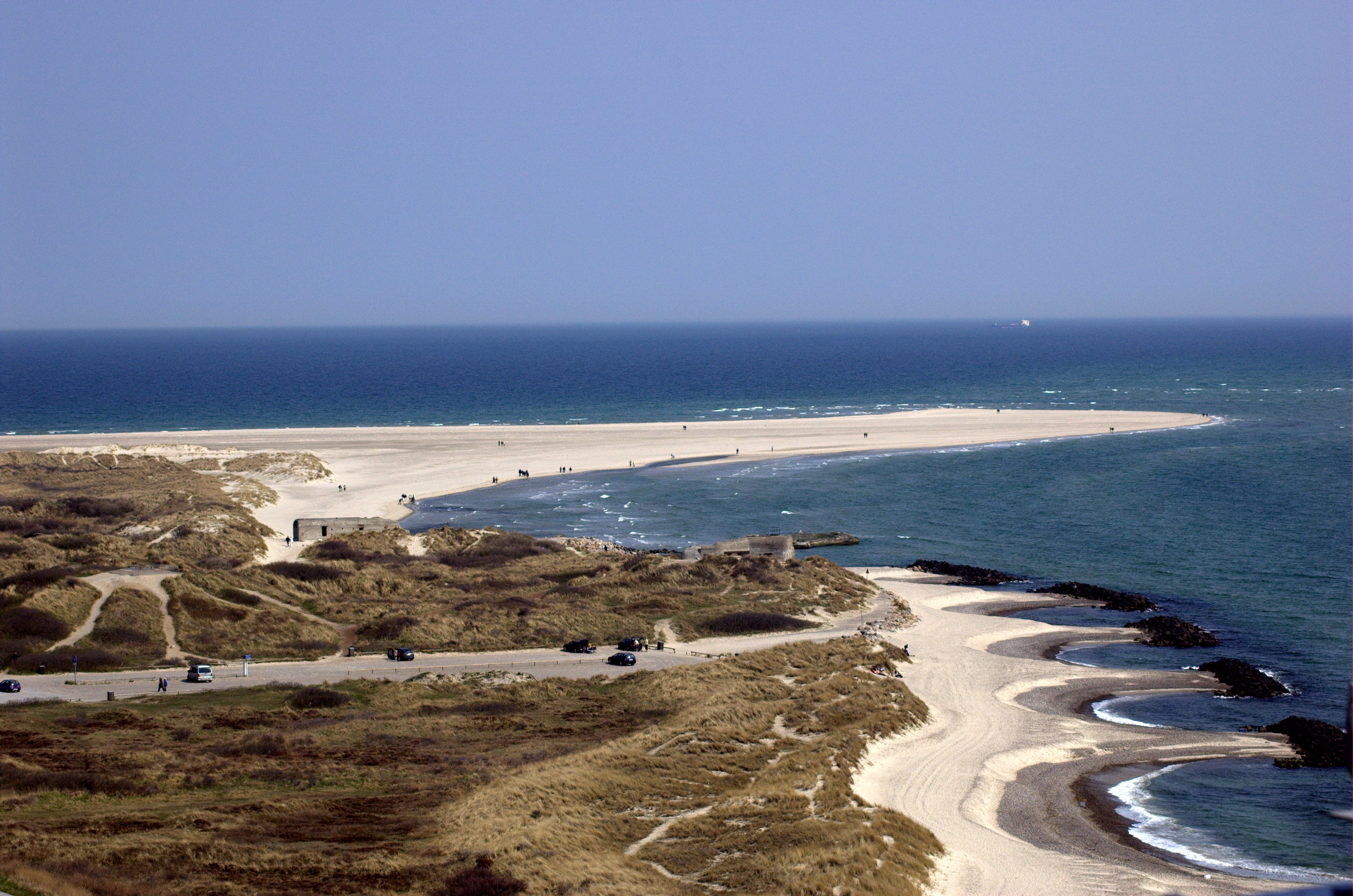
Grenen, Denmark

- Grenen, the tip of the Jutland peninsula

=== Ireland ===
- Inch Strand, Dingle Peninsula, County Kerry.
- Donabate Beach, Donabate, County Dublin.
- Portrane Beach, Portrane, County Dublin.

=== Jamaica ===
- Palisadoes, Kingston, Jamaica

=== New Zealand ===
- Aramoana, Otago
- Farewell Spit, South Island

=== Pakistan ===
- Sandspit, Karachi Pakistan

=== Russia ===
- Russkaya Koshka, Chukotka

=== Singapore ===
- Changi Beach
- Tanjong Rhu

=== Spain ===
- Cádiz, Andalusia
- La Manga, Mar Menor, Region of Murcia

=== Turkey ===
- Kum Adası, Çardak, Çanakkale
- Kumada, Altınova, Balıkesir

=== United Kingdom ===
==== Wales ====
- Conwy Morfa, Conwy
- Fairbourne Spit, Fairbourne, Gwynedd

==== England ====
- Blakeney Point, Norfolk
- Calshot Spit, Hampshire
- Chesil Beach, Dorset
- Dawlish Warren, Devon
- Hengistbury Head, Dorset
- Hurst Spit, Hampshire
- Mudeford Spit, Dorset
- Orford Ness, Suffolk
- Spurn Head, Yorkshire
- Westward Ho! Pebbleridge, Devon

=== United States ===
- Bodie Island and the Currituck Banks, on both sides of the border between Virginia and North Carolina, the northernmost of the Outer Banks
- Clatsop Spit, Oregon
- Deveaux Bank, South Carolina
- Dungeness Spit, Sequim, Washington, the longest natural sand spit in the United States.
- Ediz Hook, Port Angeles, Washington
- Fenwick Island, on both sides of the border of Delaware and Maryland
- Homer Spit, Homer, Alaska
- Kotzebue, Alaska
- Long Point, Provincetown, Massachusetts, at the tip of Cape Cod
- Minnesota Point, Duluth, Minnesota Also referred to by locals as "Park Point", it's also said to be the world's largest freshwater natural spit.
- Platinum, Alaska
- Presque Isle, Erie, Pennsylvania
- Provincetown Spit, Massachusetts
- Sandy Hook, New Jersey
- The Spit, Scituate, Massachusetts
- Willoughby Spit, Norfolk, Virginia
