= Spits of the Sea of Azov =

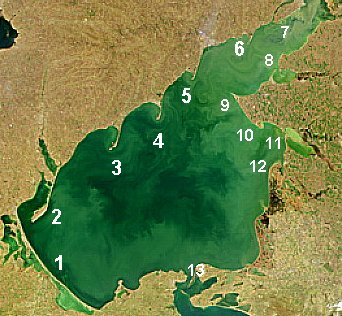
Major spits of the Azov Sea: 1. Arabat 2. Fedotov 3. Obytichna 4. Berdiansk 5. Bilosaraysk 6. Kriv 7. Beglitsk 8. Yeysk (left) and Glafirovsk (right) 9. Dolgaya 10. Kamyshevatsk 11. Yasensk 12. Achuevsk 13. Chushka

The spits of the Sea of Azov are narrow peninsulas of sand, silt and shells in the Sea of Azov. They are as long as 112 km (Arabat Spit, the world's longest spit), 45 km (Fedotov Spit), 31 km (Achuevsk Spit), 30 km (Obytichna Spit) and 23 km (Berdiansk Spit). Their total length exceeds 300 km which is larger than the width of the sea (about 180 km).

Most of the spits were formed by the deposition of sand, silt and shells by river flows into the Azov Sea bays. Therefore, many spits stretch to the south into the sea and are continuations of the (right) river banks (see table and map). The Chushka and Tuzla spits are located inside the Strait of Kerch; the former spit is formed by the outflow of water from the Azov Sea to the Black Sea and therefore also faces south, whereas the latter is facing north. A major oil spill occurred near those spits on 11 November 2007.

Most spits have a triangular base and numerous lagoons on their west side. The ends of some spits are widened and bent westwards. Their shape rapidly varies with time. For example, the Arabat Spit (the largest and most stable spit on the Azov Sea) was formed only around 1100–1200 AD, and some spits were partly or entirely washed away by water currents. Many spits are used as resting ground by migrating birds (mostly ducks, geese, swans, sandpipers, great cormorants and seagulls, see e.g. this and this pictures) and therefore some are declared national nature reserves. Examples are the Beglitsk, Bilosaraysk, Kriv and Berdiansk spits. In addition to bird colonies, the Bilosaraysk and Berdiansk spits also host more than 200 vegetation species each. The Berdiansk Spit is remarkable for having one of the oldest lighthouses on the Azov Sea (160 years old). The Petrushino Spit is historical in that in 1697, Peter I built a major fortress at its base. In July 1711, a Turkish landing operation was defeated there.

== Major spits ==
All Ukrainian spits are in the Russian-occupied territories of Ukraine as of 2024.

Major spits of the Azov Sea
Name	Coordinates	Country	Length km	Width km	Area km^{2}	Notes	Photo
Arabat Spit	45°42′N 35°0′E	Ukraine	112	0.27–8	395	The spit separates the Syvash lagoons from the Azov Sea; in the north, it is separated from the mainland (Henichesk city) by a narrow Henichesk Strait.	
Achuevsk Spit	46°01′33″N 38°01′09″E	Russia	31			Sandy spit on the eastern shore near Primorsko-Akhtarsk; it forms a shore of Akhtarsk Liman.	
Beglitsk Spit	47°06′59″N 38°34′20″E	Russia	3			The spit is located in the Taganrog Bay, about 25 km west of Taganrog, and 30 km east of the Kriv Spit. It forms a small bay of circular shape and contains about 140 species of vegetation.	
Bilosaraysk Spit	46°52′46.40″N 37°19′18.64″E	Ukraine	14	<10	6.16	The spit is located in Manhush Raion of Donetsk Oblast and separates the Taganrog Bay on the north, and the Bilosaraysk Bay on the south-east. It is formed by the river Kalmius and is 20 km south-west from Mariupol city. More than 200 plants species grow on this spit.	
Berdiansk Spit	46°39′N 36°47′E	Ukraine	23	0.04–2	7	Located in the north of the sea, it borders the Berdiansk Bay. The spit is within the limits of Berdiansk city. It is formed by the Berda River and is a nature reserve containing more than 300 species of vegetation.	
Chushka Spit	45°20′23″N 36°40′31″E	Russia	18			The spit is located in the Kerch Strait, extending from Cape Achilleion to the south-west. In 1944, it was joined to the Kerch Peninsula by the Kerch railway bridge, which was destroyed by the sea in the same year and replaced in 1955 by the Kerch Strait ferry line.	
Dolgaya Spit	46°39′35″N 37°46′00″E	Russia	9.5			Located on the east coast of the sea, it is a part of Yeysk Peninsula, Taganrog Bay and of the Yeysk District, Krasnodar Krai. Village Dolzhanskaya is at the base of the spit. The spit used to be twice as long in the early 20th century but was partly washed away.	
Fedotov Spit	46°12′33″N 35°13′49″E	Ukraine	45			Located in the north, the spit separates the Utlyuksky Lyman from the sea. It is formed by the Molochna River and has a village, Stepok, and several sanatoriums near its base.	
Glafirovsk Spit	46°44′17″N 38°23′49″E	Russia	6.6	0.05–1		Located in the northern part of Yeysk Liman, separating it from the sea. The village of Glafirovka is at the base of the spit.	
Kamyshevatsk Spit	46°22′00″N 38°00′00″E	Russia	6	<4		Located on the east coast of the Yeysk Peninsula, the spit is sickle shaped. It belongs to the Yeysk District of Krasnodar Krai and is 5 km south-east of Kamyshevatsk village.	
Kriv Spit	47°02′52″N 38°07′40″E	Ukraine	10			Located on the Ukrainian side of the Russia–Ukraine border, near the mouth of the Mius River, the spit is a continuation of its right bank. An old resort and the settlement Siedovo (c. 1750) is located at the spit's base.	
Obytichna Spit	46°31′57″N 36°12′18″E	Ukraine	30			Located on the north coast of the sea, between the Obytichna and Berdiansk bays, the spit is formed by the Obytichna River and limits the Obytichna Bay on the east.	
Pavlo-Ochakovskaya Spit	47°02′30″N 39°06′22″E	Russia				A sand and shell rock spit located on the Russian coast of the Sea of Azov, in the Taganrog Bay, about 35 km southwest of the city of Azov.	
Petrushino Spit	47°10′26″N 38°51′55″E	Russia				This spit is located on the northern Russian coast, in the Taganrog Bay, near Taganrog, about 25 km east of the Beglitskaya Spit.	
Sazalniksk Spit	46°52′28″N 38°30′08″E	Russia	3	<7		Located on the eastern Russian coast, in the Taganrog Bay, 25 km north-east of Yeysk. Like most of the other spits, it was originally covered with grass and bushes, but a 36-hectare groove of Populus and pine was planted on it in 1977.	
Tuzla Spit	45°16′6″N 36°33′0″E	Ukraine Russia	4			This used to be a single body, which was split by the waterflow into the alluvial Tuzla Island and Tuzla Spit in 1925, both located in the middle of the Kerch Strait. The Tuzla Island is about 6 km long, but is being washed away by the flow. Geographically, the island belongs to the city of Kerch, Ukraine, and the spit to Krasnodar Krai, Russia; however, the legal status is yet undefined. A heavy Russo-German battle occurred on the island on 6–9 October 1943.	
Yasensk Spit	46°14′11″N 38°15′56″E	Russia	14	<3		Located on the east coast, between Yasensk Bay and Beysugsk Liman.	
Yeysk Spit	46°44′10″N 38°17′15″E	Russia	3			The spit is the central resort area of the Yeysk city and a part of Yeysk Peninsula. Its length used to be about 9 km, but was reduced by a storm on 13 March 1914.	

== See also ==
- Sea of Azov
