= Chushka Spit =

Sandbar in the Sea of Azov

Chushka Spit Kosa Chushka
- Spit
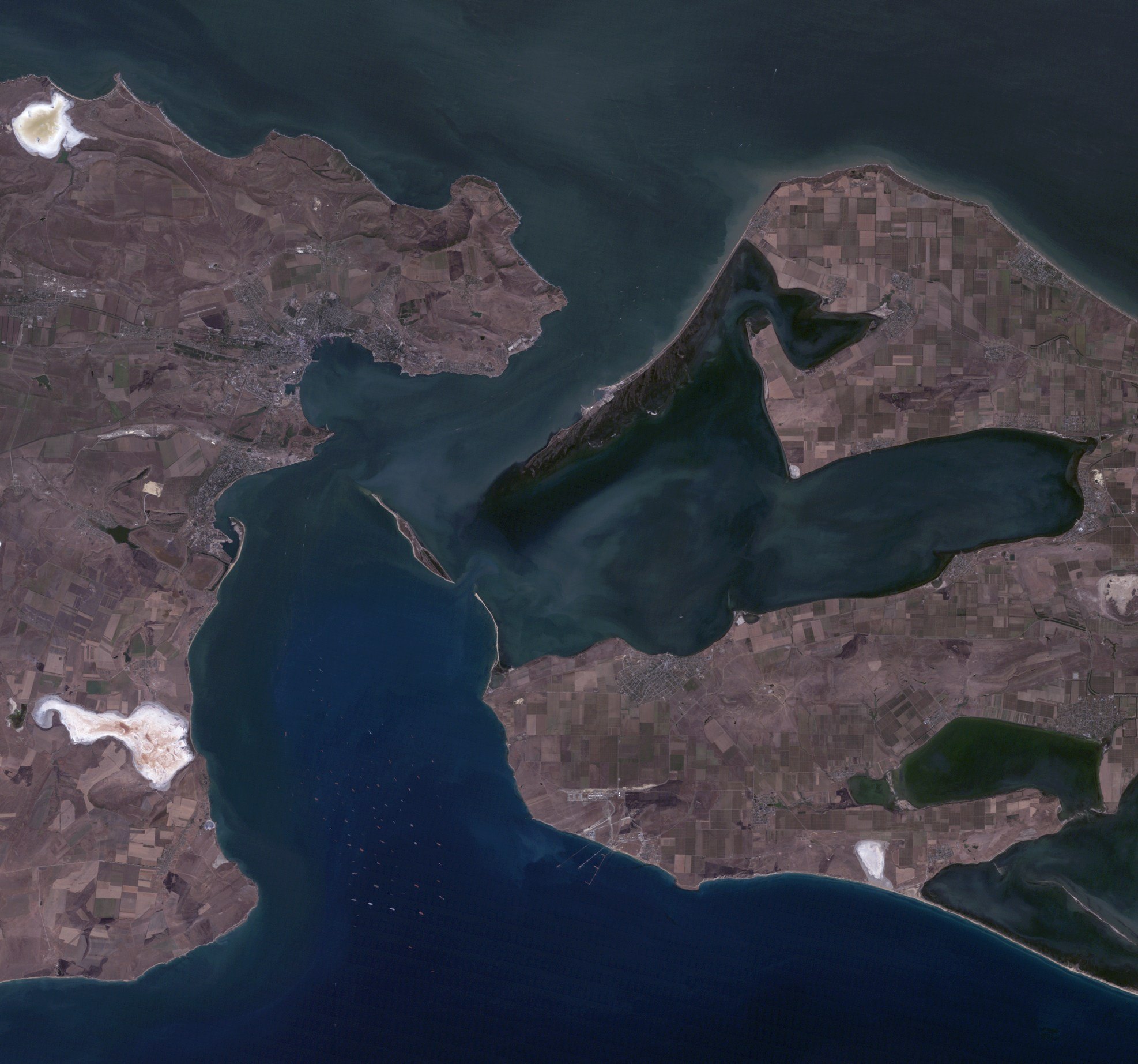
- Kerch Strait satellite image. LandSat-5. 2011-08-30

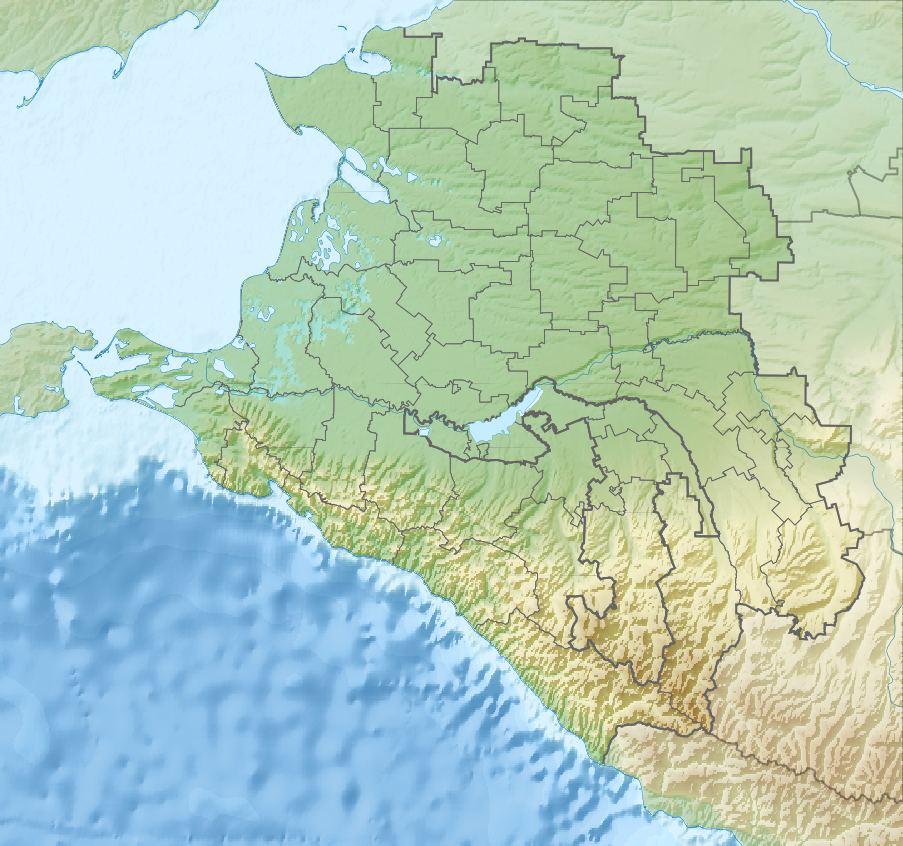
- Interactive map of Chushka Spit
- Coordinates: 45°21′00″N 36°41′41″E
- Location: Temryuksky District, Krasnodar Krai, Russia
- Part of: Tuzla Island

Dimensions
  - Length: 18 kilometres (11 mi)

Chushka Spit (Russian: Коса Чушка) is a sandy spit in the northern part of the Strait of Kerch. It extends from Cape Achilleion and the town of Ilich to the south-west in the direction of the Black Sea for almost 18 kilometres (11 mi). Administratively, it belongs to Temryuksky District, Krasnodar Krai, Russia.

== Geography ==
The Chushka Spit forms the northern shore of Taman Bay; the southern shore was formerly the Tuzla Spit. It has many long branches extending to the south. In 1914 a lighthouse with a fixed red light at a height of 75.5 feet (23.0 m) was constructed.

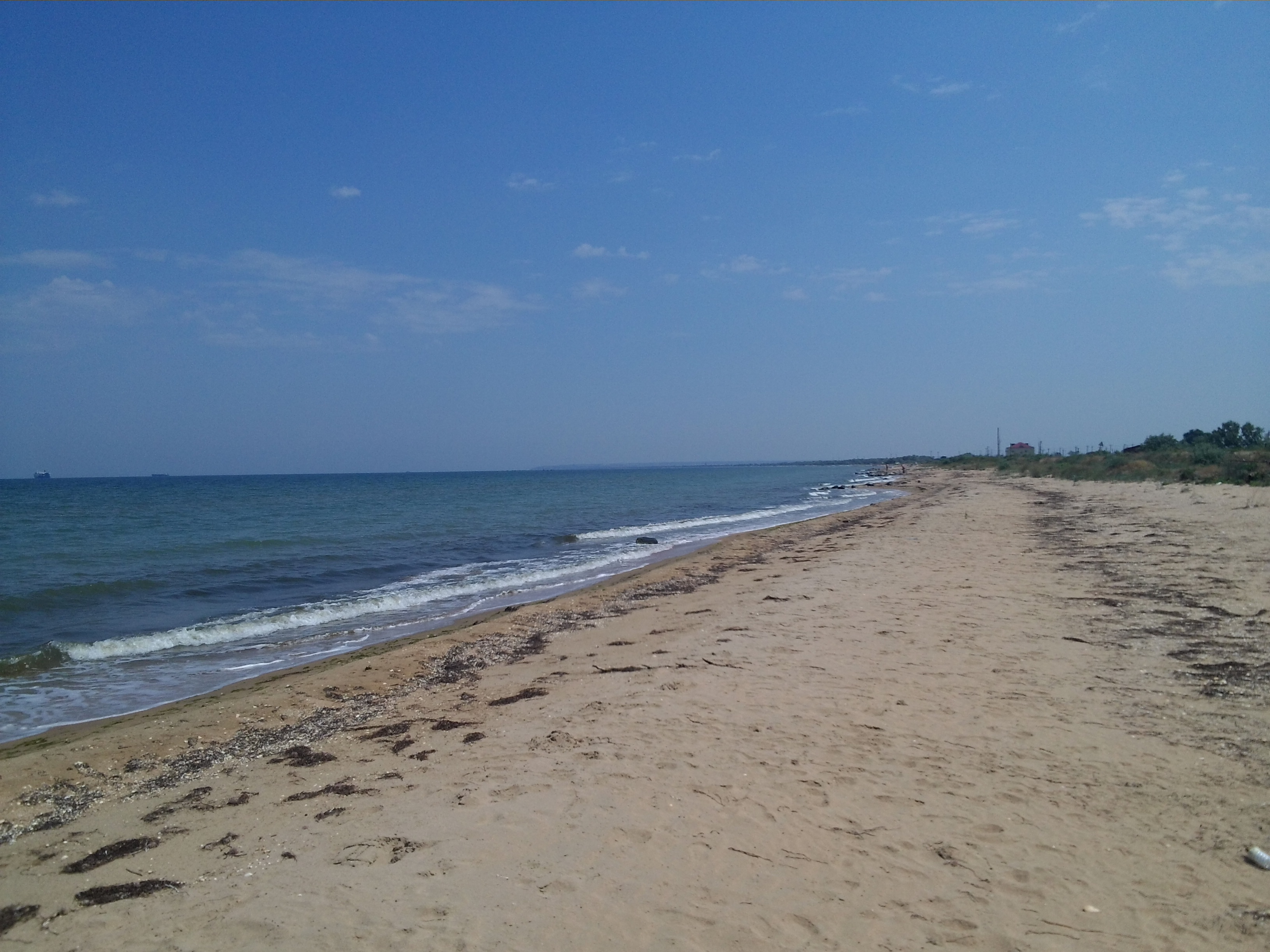
The shore on Chushka Spit

A railway line and a highway run along the spit to Port Kavkaz, at the locality of Chushka, towards the end of the spit. As well as freight being shipped through the port, it is the terminal of the Kerch Strait ferry line connecting the Taman Peninsula with Crimea. The Kerch railway bridge that was built in 1944, then damaged by storms and ice and dismantled in 1945, ran from Chushka across the strait to the Kerch Peninsula.

== Ecology ==
During a storm in November 2007, a Russian-flagged oil tanker was damaged off the Chushka Spit, resulting in the release of more than 2000 metric tons of fuel oil. Invertebrates such as Mytilus galloprovincialis were badly affected by the spill, but recovered by the following summer.

Location of Chushka Spit lighthouse at 45°18′35.3″N 36°38′23.9″E

== See also ==
- Spits of the Sea of Azov
- Dolgaya Spit
- Arabat Spit
