= Dolzhansky =

Dolzhansky (masculine), Dolzhanskaya (feminine), or Dolzhanskoye (neuter) may refer to:

- Dolzhansky District, a district of Oryol Oblast, Russia
- Dolzhansky (rural locality) (Dolzhanskaya, Dolzhanskoye), name of several rural localities in Russia
- Dolzhansky, a Slavic surname.
