= Taman Bay =

Bay in the Kerch Strait in Russia

Coordinates: 45°16′26″N 36°46′59″E

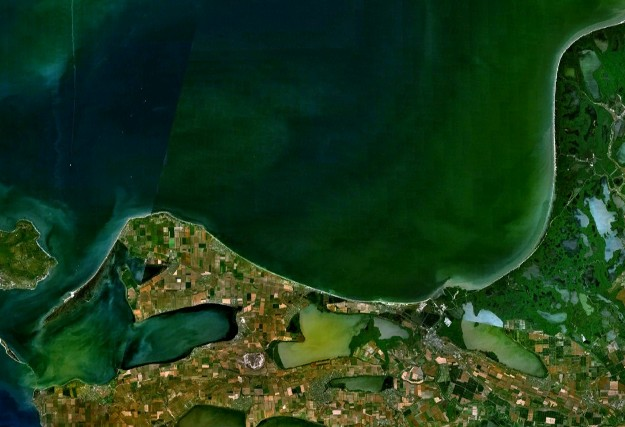
The Taman Bay is shown at the bottom left.

The Taman Bay (Russian: Таманский залив) is a shallow bay or gulf on the east coast of the Strait of Kerch shaped on the southern side by the Tuzla Spit and to the north by the Chushka Spit. It dips into the Taman Peninsula of Krasnodar Krai, Russia for about 16 km. The bay is 8 km wide at its mouth and is up to 5 metres deep. Fishing villages and the old townlet of Taman afford fine views of the bay.

It is full of islets, many carved out from the Tuzla Spit by a storm in 1925. Some of the Tuzla Spit was reconstituted during construction of the Crimean Bridge.

Freezing normally begins in mid-December and continues until March.
