= Ilich, Russia =

Village in Russia

Ilich, Russia Ильич
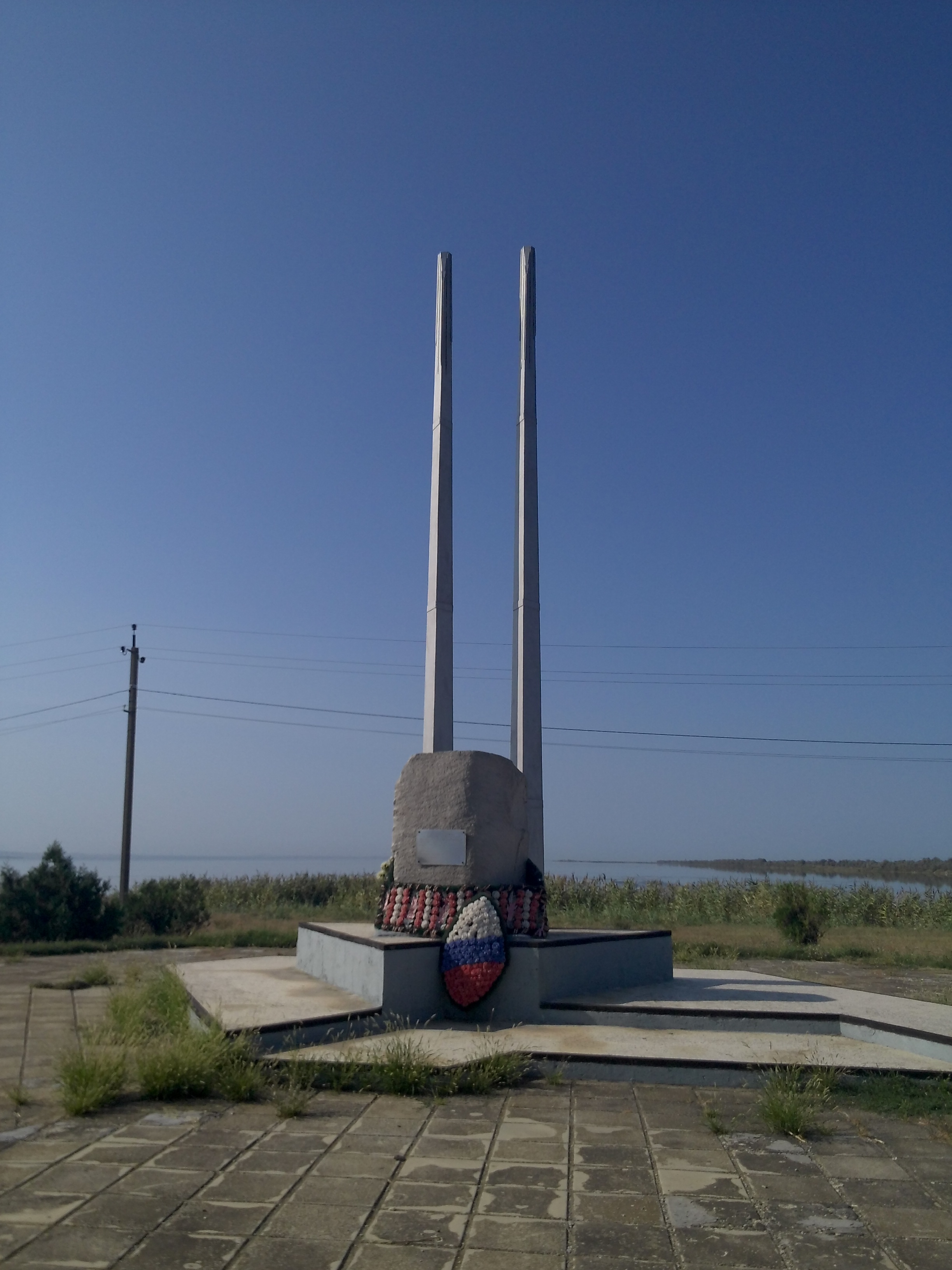
- Illich War Memorial
- Interactive map of Ilich, Russia
- District: Temryuksky District
- First-level administrative division: Krasnodar Krai
- Country: Russia

Ilich or Il'ich (Russian: Ильич) is a village in the Temryuksky District, Krasnodar Krai, Russia. The village is located on the Kerch Strait, near its mouth on the Sea of Azov. The Chushka Spit extends from the village to the south.
