= Dolzhansky (rural locality) =

Dolzhansky (Russian: Должанский; masculine), Dolzhanskaya (Должанская; feminine), or Dolzhanskoye (Должанское; neuter) is the name of several rural localities in Russia:

- Dolzhanskaya, a stanitsa in Yeysky District of Krasnodar Krai
- Dolzhanskoye, a settlement in Alekseyevsky Rural Okrug of Krasnoznamensky District of Kaliningrad Oblast
