= Yeysk =

Town in Krasnodar Krai, Russia

Yeysk Ейск
- Town
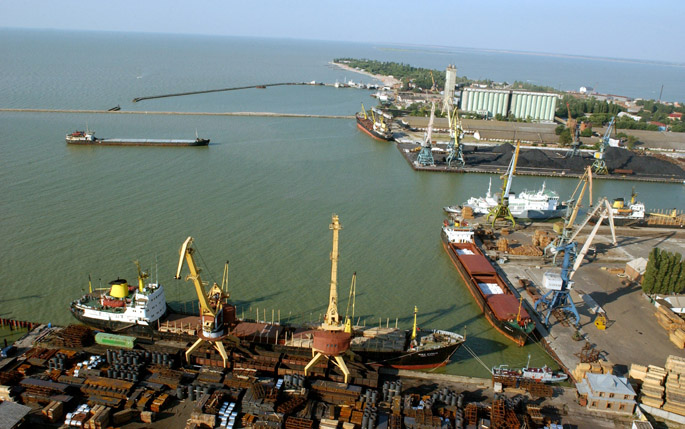
- Yeysk port, 2006

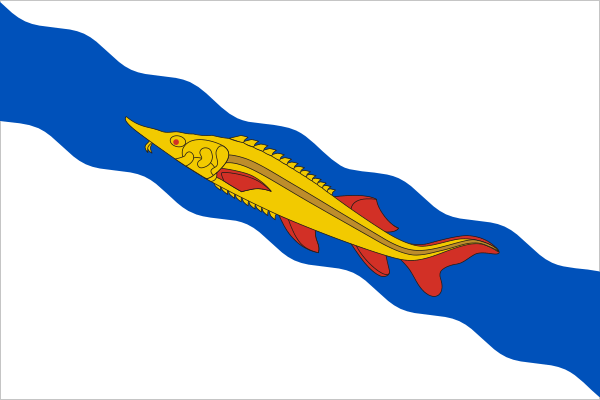
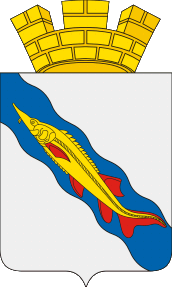
- Flag Coat of arms
- Interactive map of Yeysk
- Location of Yeysk Yeysk (Krasnodar Krai)
- Coordinates: 46°42′40″N 38°16′24″E
- Country: Russia
- Federal subject: Krasnodar Krai
- Founded: 1848

Government
  - Head: Valery Kulkov
- Elevation: 10 m (33 ft)

Population (2010 Census)
  - Total: 87,769
  - Estimate (2025): 81,099 (−7.6%)
  - Rank: 192nd in 2010

Administrative status
  - Subordinated to: Town of Yeysk
  - Capital of: Town of Yeysk, Yeysky District

Municipal status
  - Municipal district: Yeysky Municipal District
  - Urban settlement: Yeyskoye Urban Settlement
  - Capital of: Yeysky Municipal District, Yeyskoye Urban Settlement
- Time zone: UTC+3 (MSK)
- Postal code: 353680-353691
- Dialing code: +7 86132
- OKTMO ID: 03616101001
- Town Day: Third Sunday of August
- Website: www.adm-yeisk.ru

Yeysk (Russian: Ейск) is a port and a resort town in Krasnodar Krai, Russia, situated on the shore of the Taganrog Gulf of the Sea of Azov. The town is built primarily on the Yeysk Spit, which separates the Yeya River from the Sea of Azov. Population: 82,943 (2021 census); 87,769 (2010 census); 86,349 (2002 census); 78,150 (1989 Soviet census).

== History ==
In the 14th century, in this area was a Genoese colony with a port called Balzimachi (or Bacinaci), which is mentioned in Pratica della mercatura.

Tsutsiev's Atlas shows a Yeyskoye at the head of the Yeya bay for 1763-1785 and a Yeysk somewhat south of the present location from 1829 to 1839. In 1783 it was involved in the Kuban Nogai Uprising. A 19th century founding of the modern town occurred in 1848 by Prince Mikhail Semyonovich Vorontsov in accordance with a royal order from the Tsar of Russia.

== Administrative and municipal status ==
Within the framework of administrative divisions, Yeysk serves as the administrative center of Yeysky District, even though it is not a part of it. As an administrative division, it is, together with the territory of Shirochansky Rural Okrug (which comprises seven rural localities), incorporated separately as the Town of Yeysk — an administrative unit with the status equal to that of the districts. As a municipal division, the Town of Yeysk is incorporated within Yeysky Municipal District as Yeyskoye Urban Settlement.

== Yeysk resorts ==
Yeysk is known for its mineral waters and its medicinal mud baths. This mud is brought from the neighboring Lake Khanskoye. The town has a number of parks, a sanatorium, several recreation centers, hotels, and beaches. The bathing season lasts from May until September. Yeysk offers a variety of attractions, restaurants, open-air cafes, clubs, bars, and nightclubs.

Dolgaya Spit, near the village of Dolzhanskaya, has holiday houses.

== Airfield ==
Yeysk has a mixed military/civilian airfield, home to the Yeysk Military Institute during the Cold War and the 10th Mixed Aviation Division (4th Air Army) during the 1990s.

After the disbandment of the 10th Mixed Aviation Division the headquarters of the 1st Guards Stalingrad, Svirsky Composite Air Division arrived. Also at the airport based aviation group Yeisk Higher Military Institute, armed with planes L-39.

In addition, the 959th Bomber Regiment was previously based at the airfield, which was part of the 1st Guards Composite Air Division. The 959th Bomber Aviation Regiment was previously the 959th Training Aviation Regiment. In September 2009, due to the transfer of the airfield from the Air Force to the Navy, the regiment was disbanded, and its members were part of the aircraft Su-24 relocated to Morozovsk airfield (6970th Air Base, 7th Brigade of Aerospace Defence).

On February 1, 2010, 859th Naval Aviation Training Center under the leadership of Major-General Alexei Serdyuk was open at the airfield. To ensure the educational process training units will be relocated from the Ostrov (air base) (Pskov Oblast) and the village of Kacha. For service center from the previously disbanded and civilian staff will be involved in more than one thousand people.

On 17 October 2022, a Sukhoi Su-34 from the airfield accidentally crashed into an apartment building in Yeysk, killing at least 13.

== Climate ==
Yeysk has a mild climate. Average low temperature in January is −4 °C (25 °F). Summers are very warm, with average July temperature of +24 °C (75 °F). Average rainfall is about 450 mm (18 in) a year.

Climate data for Yeysk
Month	Jan	Feb	Mar	Apr	May	Jun	Jul	Aug	Sep	Oct	Nov	Dec	Year
Record high °C (°F)	14.8 (58.6)	27.0 (80.6)	28.2 (82.8)	29.0 (84.2)	35.0 (95.0)	38.5 (101.3)	38.7 (101.7)	40.2 (104.4)	34.8 (94.6)	32.0 (89.6)	27.0 (80.6)	19.0 (66.2)	40.2 (104.4)
Mean daily maximum °C (°F)	1.9 (35.4)	3.2 (37.8)	8.1 (46.6)	16.4 (61.5)	21.9 (71.4)	25.7 (78.3)	29.9 (85.8)	29.7 (85.5)	23.6 (74.5)	16.5 (61.7)	9.1 (48.4)	3.5 (38.3)	15.8 (60.4)
Daily mean °C (°F)	−0.8 (30.6)	−0.1 (31.8)	4.8 (40.6)	11.4 (52.5)	16.7 (62.1)	21.0 (69.8)	24.2 (75.6)	24.0 (75.2)	18.5 (65.3)	12.0 (53.6)	5.3 (41.5)	1.1 (34.0)	11.5 (52.7)
Mean daily minimum °C (°F)	−3.4 (25.9)	−3.3 (26.1)	1.4 (34.5)	6.3 (43.3)	11.4 (52.5)	16.3 (61.3)	18.4 (65.1)	18.2 (64.8)	13.3 (55.9)	7.4 (45.3)	1.5 (34.7)	−1.4 (29.5)	7.2 (45.0)
Record low °C (°F)	−30.0 (−22.0)	−29.0 (−20.2)	−21.0 (−5.8)	−6.1 (21.0)	−1.0 (30.2)	4.0 (39.2)	11.9 (53.4)	9.0 (48.2)	1.1 (34.0)	−9.4 (15.1)	−20.0 (−4.0)	−25.0 (−13.0)	−30.0 (−22.0)
Average precipitation mm (inches)	53 (2.1)	43 (1.7)	48 (1.9)	44 (1.7)	39 (1.5)	48 (1.9)	26 (1.0)	25 (1.0)	35 (1.4)	32 (1.3)	41 (1.6)	60 (2.4)	494 (19.4)

== International relations ==
=== Twin towns — Sister cities ===
Yeysk is twinned with:

- Baranovichi, Belarus
- Barysaw, Belarus
