= Yeysk Spit =

Sandbar in the Sea of Azov

Yeysk Spit Kosa Yeyskaya
- Spit
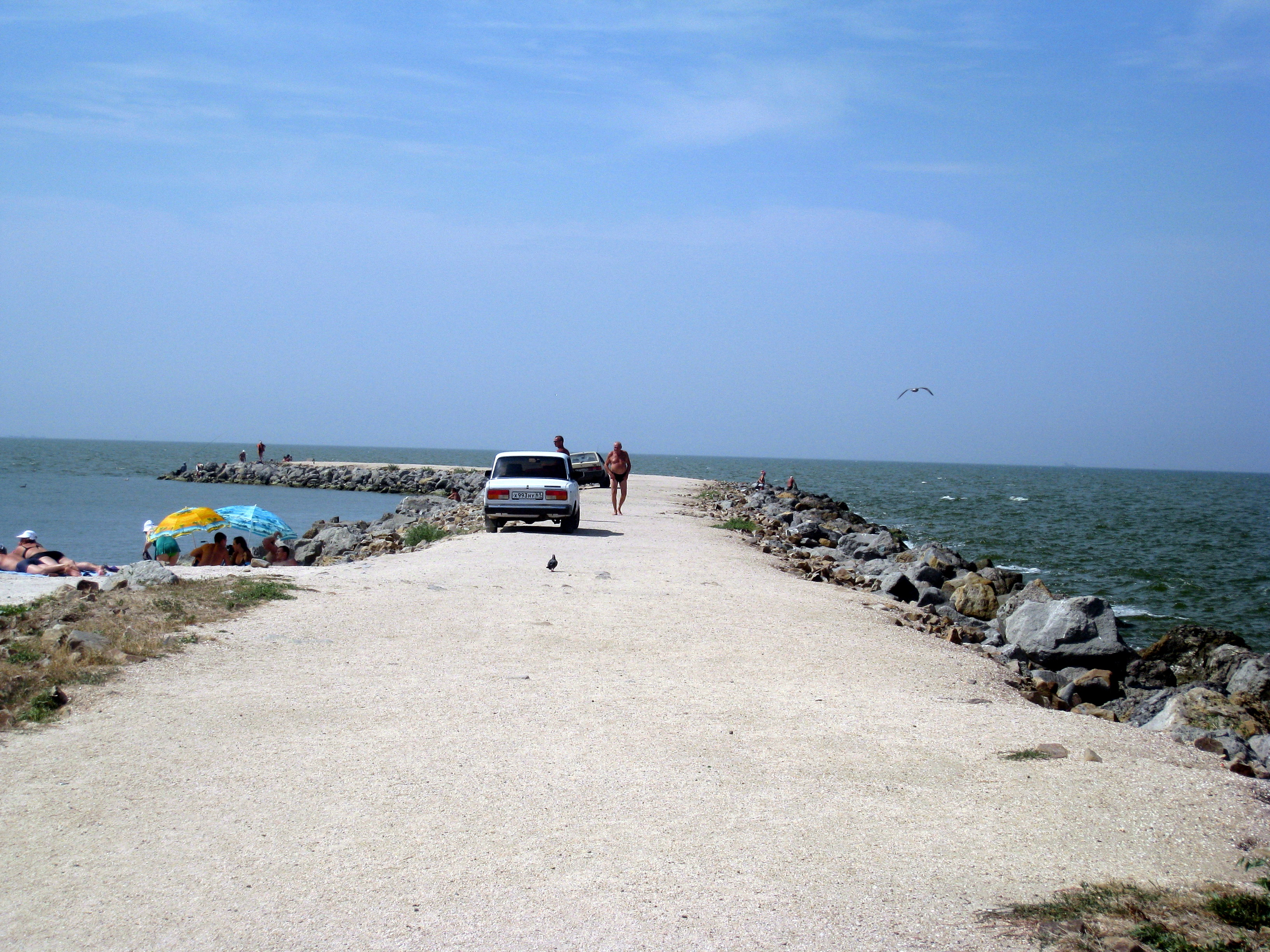
- Protective stone pier at the end of the Yeysk Spit

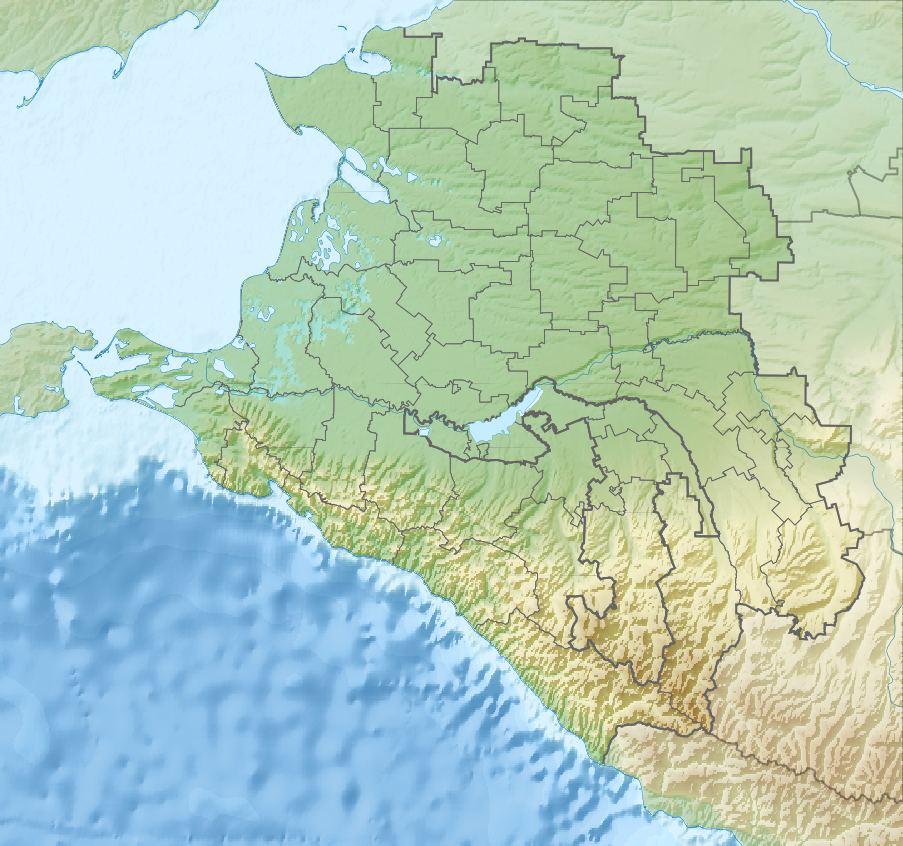
- Coordinates: 46°14′11″N 38°15′56″E
- Location: Krasnodar Krai, Russia

Yeysk Spit or Kosa Yeyskaya (Russian: Ейская коса) is an alluvial sandy spit in the Sea of Azov, part of the Yeysk Peninsula. The central resort area of the city of Yeysk. The length of the sand spit is about 3 km, but before the 1914 storm, it reached 9 km.

== History ==
On 13 March 1914 a strong hurricane broke out, part of the spit was washed away, its stem was cut away and it turned into an island.

== See also ==
- Spits of the Sea of Azov
- Dolgaya Spit
