= Taman, Russia =

Place in Krasnodar Krai, Russia

Taman Тамань
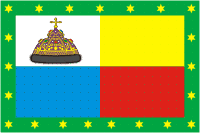
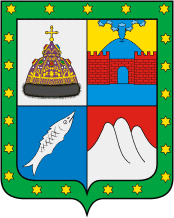
- Flag Coat of arms
- Interactive map of Taman
- Location of Taman Taman (European Russia) Taman (Black Sea)
- Coordinates: 45°13′N 36°43′E
- Country: Russia
- Federal subject: Krasnodar Krai
- Administrative district: Temryuksky District
- Founded: 6th century BCE (Julian)
- Elevation: 4 m (13 ft)

Population
  - Estimate (2020): 9,417 )
- Time zone: UTC+3 (MSK)
- Postal code: 353556
- OKTMO ID: 03651425101

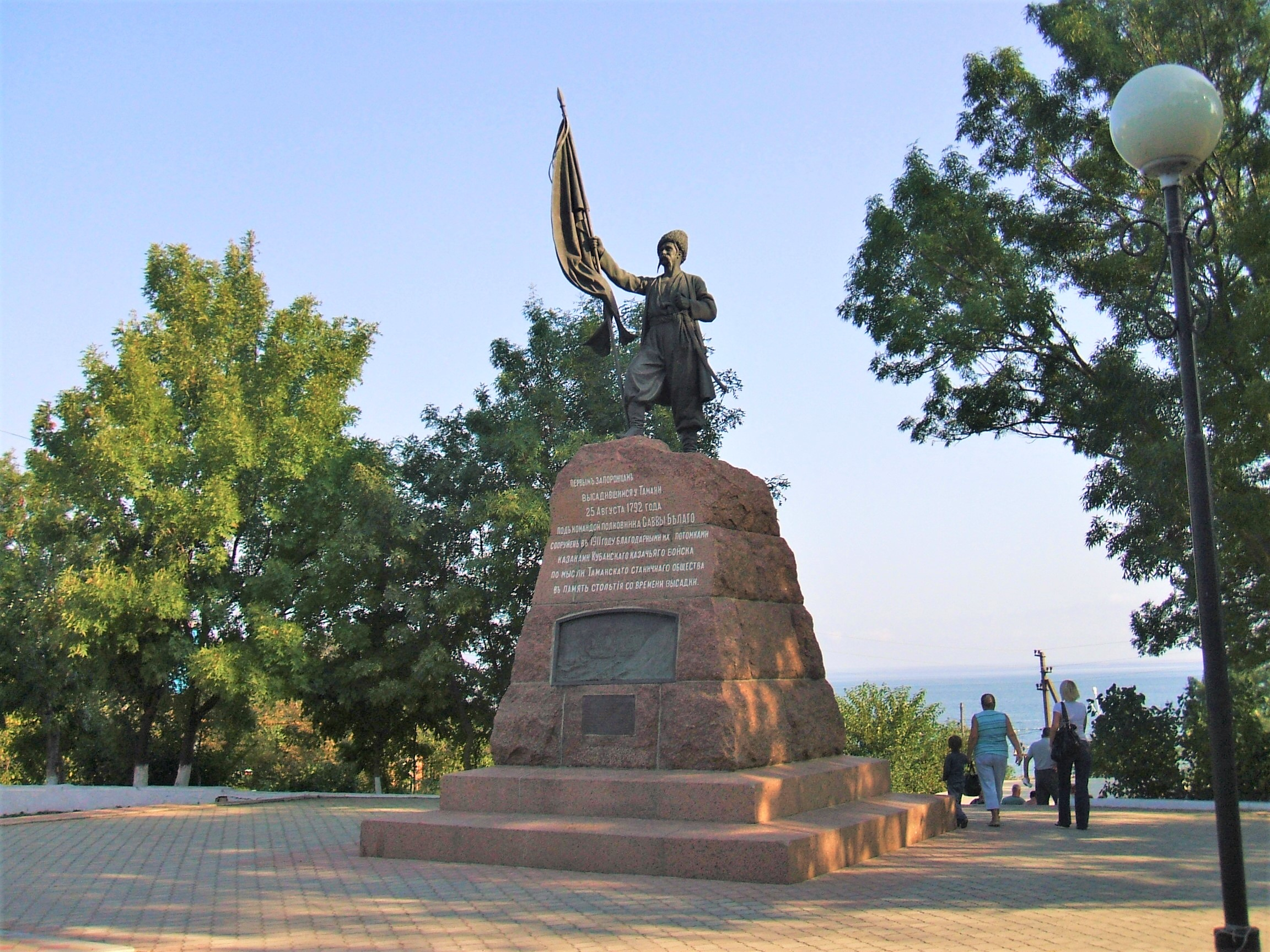
Amandus Adamson's monument to the first Kuban Cossacks (1911)

Taman (Russian: Тамань) is a stanitsa (village) in the Temryuksky District of Krasnodar Krai, Russia. It is on the Taman Peninsula and on the coast of Taman Bay, an inlet off Kerch Strait. It is the administrative center of the Taman rural settlement, which also contains the much smaller village of Volna, on the southern side of the peninsula, where the Port of Taman is. The population of Taman stanitsa was recorded at 9,417 people (2020), 10,027 (2010 census) and 9,297 (2002 census).

== History ==
Taman was under German occupation from September 1942 until they were completely pushed out of the Taman Peninsula in October 1943.

== Port of Taman ==
In August 2008, then-Prime Minister Vladimir Putin signed a government resolution authorizing the development of a major international cargo port several kilometers south of Taman. Sometime after that, a fertilizer terminal was under construction there to link with the ammonia pipeline to Odessa owned by TogliattiAzot.

In August 2013 Transport Minister Maksim Sokolov said that the Port of Taman would open in 2019 to handle dry cargoes, such as grain and coal. He also added that federal spending would amount to $2.3 billion, while private investors were expected to contribute the remaining 152 billion rubles.

As of 2012, the first tonne of cargo was planned to be sent from the port in September 2016.
