= Tuzla Spit =

Sandbar in the Black Sea

Tuzla Spit Kosa Tuzla
- Spit
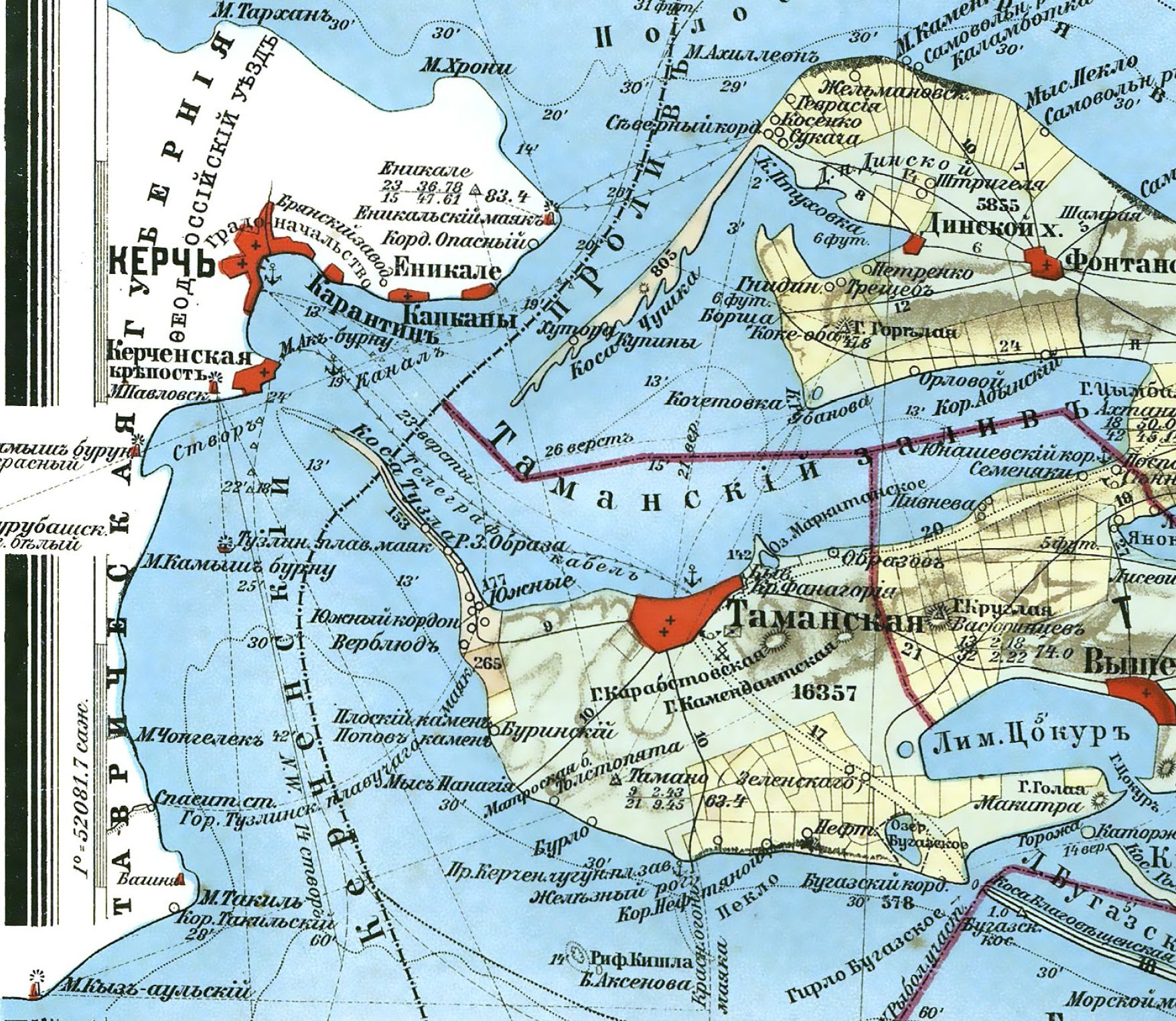
- Tuzla Spit on a 1902 map of the Strait of Kerch.

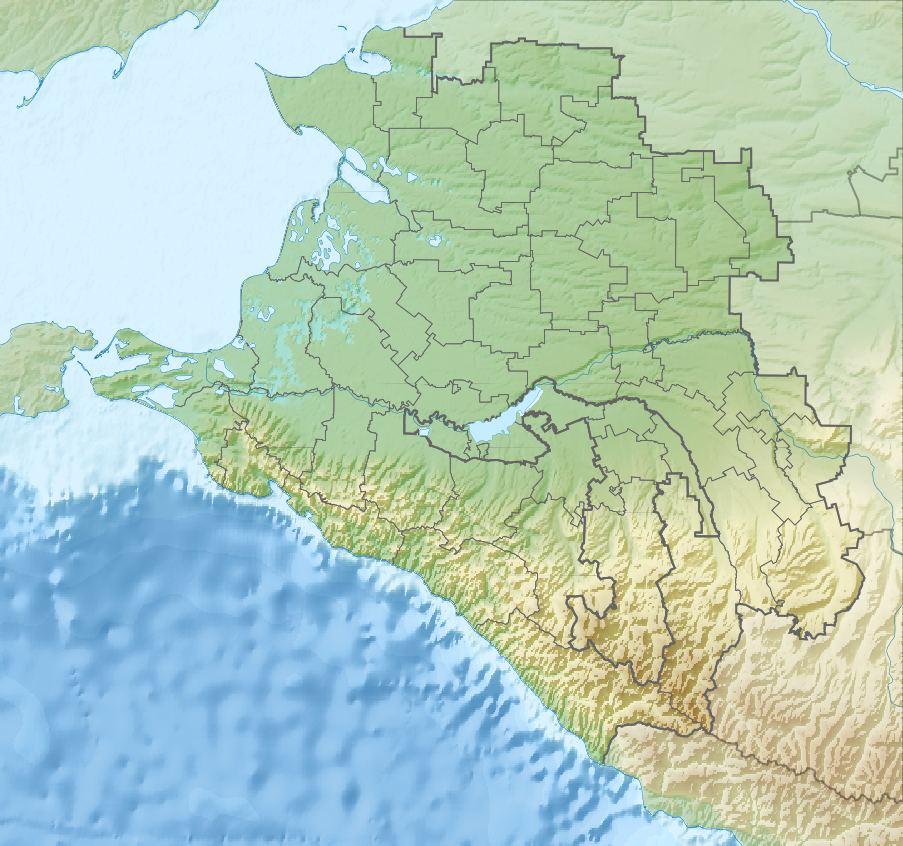
- Interactive map of Tuzla Spit
- Coordinates: 45°16′0″N 36°33′0″E
- Location: Krasnodar Krai, Russia, Ukraine
- Part of: Tuzla Island

Tuzla Spit or Kosa Tuzla (Russian: 'Тузлинская коса', Коса Тузла, romanized: Tuzlinskaya kosa, Ukrainian: Коса Тузла) was a long narrow peninsula or sandy spit in the eastern part of the Strait of Kerch which extended from Cape Tuzla to the north-west in the direction of the city Kerch for almost 11 kilometres (6.8 mi).

== History ==
In 1925, the spit was cut by a storm, forming Tuzla Island. The open-water channel between Tuzla Island and the Russian mainland where the spit had previously existed reached over a kilometer in width.

Tuzla Spit consisted of the Tuzla Island (45°16′07″N 36°32′58″E) and two small islands on the Russian side (45°13′33″N 36°35′34″E and 45°12′49″N 36°36′26″E), and a narrow sand bar connecting them all. The two small islands were re-connected to each other by the 2003 construction by Russia of the 4.1 km long Tuzla dam (45°14′39″N 36°35′31″E).

The Tuzla Spit formed the southern shore of the Taman Bay; the northern shore is the Chushka Spit.

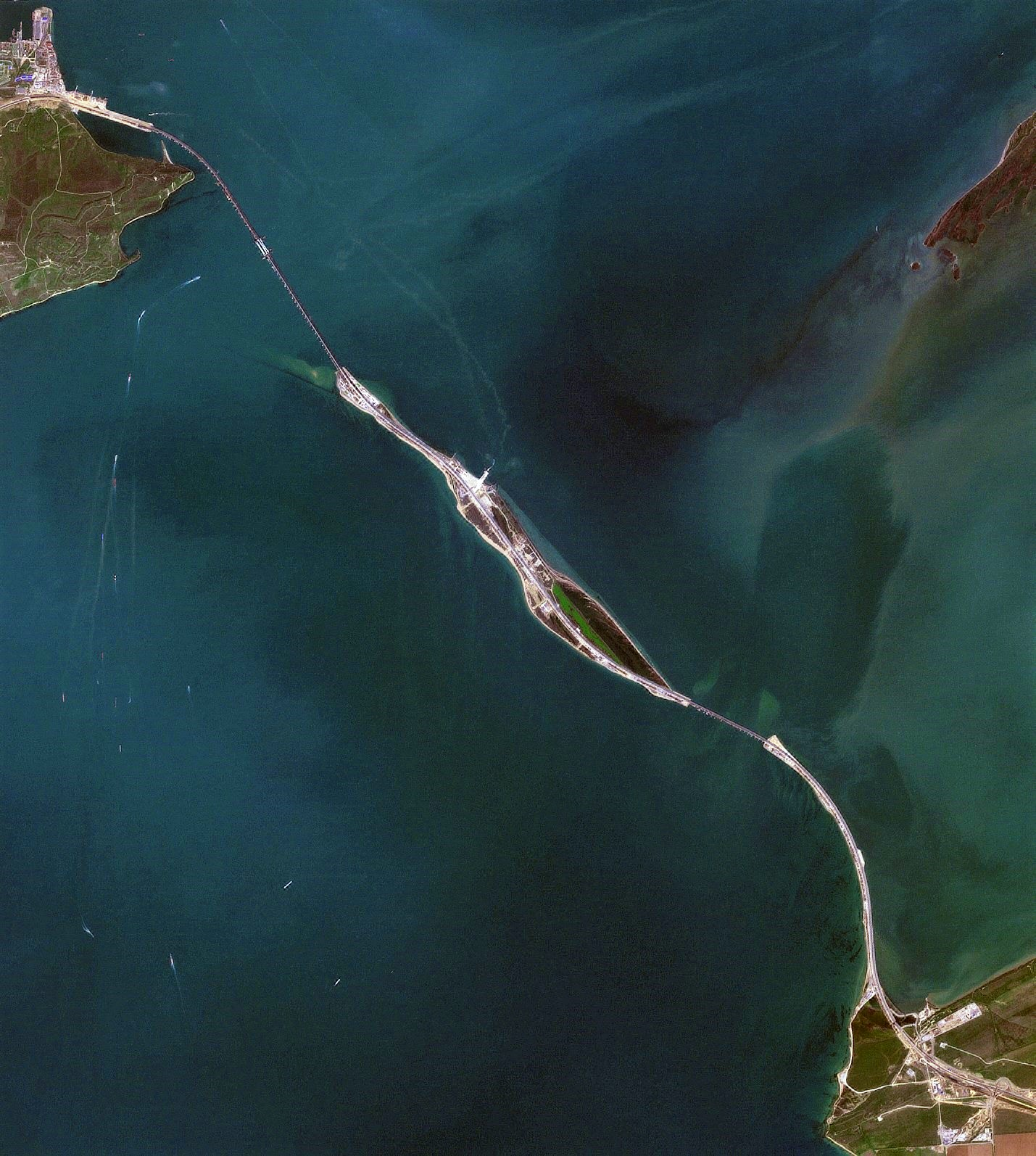
Former Tuzla Spit and Tuzla Island in Kerch Strait connected with mainland via Crimean Bridge.

== Crimean bridge ==
The remnants of the Tuzla Spit were utilized in the building of the Crimean Bridge.

== See also ==
- Spits of the Sea of Azov
- Dolgaya Spit
- Arabat Spit
