= Tuzla Island =

Small island in the Strait of Kerch, Crimea

Native name: острів Тузла
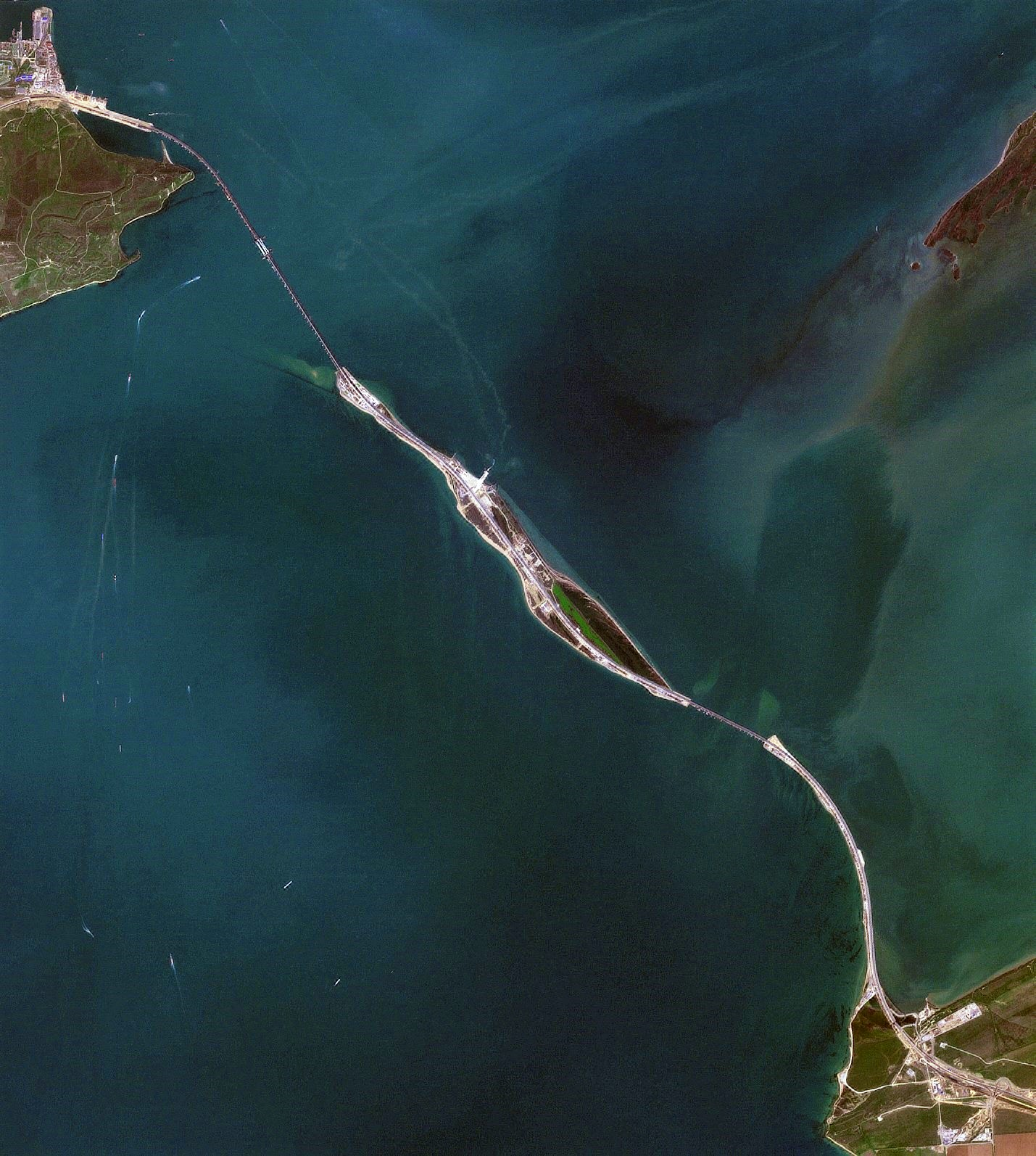
- Satellite photo of the Strait of Kerch and the Crimean Bridge, with Tuzla Island at centre

- Location within Ukraine Location within Crimea Location within European Russia Location within Europe

Geography
- Location: Strait of Kerch
- Coordinates: 45°16′N 36°33′E
- Area: 2.1 km^{2} (0.81 sq mi)

Administration
- Disputed: Russia (de facto); Ukraine (de jure)

Demographics
- Population: 0 (2012)

The Tuzla Island (Ukrainian: острів Тузла, romanized: ostriv Tuzla; Russian: остров Тузла, romanized: ostrov Tuzla; Crimean Tatar: Tuzla, lit. 'salt pan'; from Turkic "tuzla" – salty, saline) is a sandy islet in the form of a spit located in the middle of the Strait of Kerch, between the Kerch Peninsula in the west and the Taman Peninsula in the east. The island was formed from part of the Taman Peninsula after a 1925 storm.

The Strait of Kerch connects the Sea of Azov and the Black Sea. Administratively, Tuzla Island is part of the Kerch municipality of eastern Crimea.

== Infrastructure ==
Officially the island does not have a permanent settlement; however, it had a border station (the Simferopol Detachment of the Border Service of Ukraine), a small fishing settlement with a few private garden lots, and two vacation resorts, "Albatross" and "Two Seas". The island's electricity was supplied by two diesel power stations. The island also had a pier and a helicopter pad. A second pier located near the fishing settlement was in critical condition and not in use. Two concrete surface roads run along the island. From May through October, a store operated at the "Two Seas" resort.

The island was used during the construction of the Crimean Bridge, which opened in May 2018, connecting Crimea to the Taman Peninsula.

== History ==
Tuzla Island was formed when the spit that continued the Taman peninsula suffered from massive erosion during a major storm in 1925. In ancient times (2,500 years ago) the sea level was four meters below the present, which meant that at the site of modern Tuzla was quite an extensive area of land, which was part of the Taman Peninsula. Taman Peninsula itself at that time was part of the Kuban delta, and was separated from the rest of the land by river channels, which drained into the Sea of Azov and the Black Sea. Some historians identify Tuzla as the island of Alopeka, mentioned by ancient authors, located in the waters of Cimmerian Bosporus, and when the island periodically joined to the Asian shore of the Bosporus, the resulting braid was used as the entrance to the passage through the narrowest part of the Cimmerian Bosporus, which is located between Alopekoy and the European shore of the Bosporus. Other historians and geologists reject such a hypothesis, believing that neither the island nor the Tuzla Spit existed in ancient times.

Before the Soviet Union entered World War II in 1939, it was part of the Crimean Oblast. This in turn on February 19, 1954, became a part of the Ukrainian SSR, which after the dissolution of the Soviet Union in 1991 became the state of Ukraine.

== 2003 dispute ==
There was a territorial dispute over the ownership of the island between Ukraine and Russia in October 2003. The Russian authorities claimed the 1954 transfer of Crimea to Ukraine had only included the continental parts of Crimea, even though the Tuzla Island had been administratively part of Crimea since 1941.

The Russian side started to build a causeway from the Taman Peninsula towards the island to revive the eroded peninsula without any preliminary consultations with the Ukrainian government authorities. After the construction of the 3.8 km causeway was suspended exactly at the Russian-Ukrainian border, the distance between the causeway and the island was 1,200 m (3,900 ft). The causeway increased the intensity of the stream in the strait and the deterioration of the island. To prevent the deterioration, the government of Ukraine funded groundwork to deepen the bed of the strait. Ukraine refused to recognize the strait as inner waters of both countries until 2003.

On October 21, 2003, the Border Service of Ukraine briefly detained the Russian tugboat Truzhenik, which had crossed the State Border of Ukraine and conducted photo and video surveillance of the island. On October 23, 2003, the Ukrainian parliament issued a resolution "to eliminate a threat to the territorial integrity of Ukraine that appeared as a result of dam construction by the Russian Federation in the strait of Kerch". A provisional special parliamentary commission was created to investigate the case more thoroughly.

On October 30–31, 2003, talks started between Ukraine and Russia that led to suspension of the construction of the causeway. Due to the conflict, on December 2, 2003, a border patrol station of Ukraine was installed on the island. On December 5, 2003, the Cabinet of Ukraine issued Order #735p in regard to urgent measures to save the island. On July 4, 2004, the Cabinet of Ukraine issued Order #429p, which foresaw the construction of shore reinforcement structures and population transfer from the flooding territories.

Following the 2003 conflict, the Supreme Council of Crimea ordered the establishment of a new settlement on the island. However, on September 6, 2006, the Kerch city administration refused to create such a settlement, as it conflicted with the administrative-territorial composition of the city.

The distance to the unfinished causeway that stretches from the Taman Peninsula is about 100 m (330 ft), with water depth along the former shallow no more than 60 cm (24 in).

Disputes about the right of passage were resolved by a 2003 bilateral agreement on cooperation in the use of the Sea of Azov and the Strait of Kerch, which made these water bodies shared internal waters of both countries, but new tensions arose after the 2014 Russian annexation of Crimea and Sevastopol.

== Since the Russian annexation of Crimea ==
Since Russia annexed Crimea in March 2014, the island has been transferred into the possession of Russia's central government by the newly established Crimean authorities and was used as a stepping stone for a new bridge linking Crimea to mainland Russia.

== Gallery ==
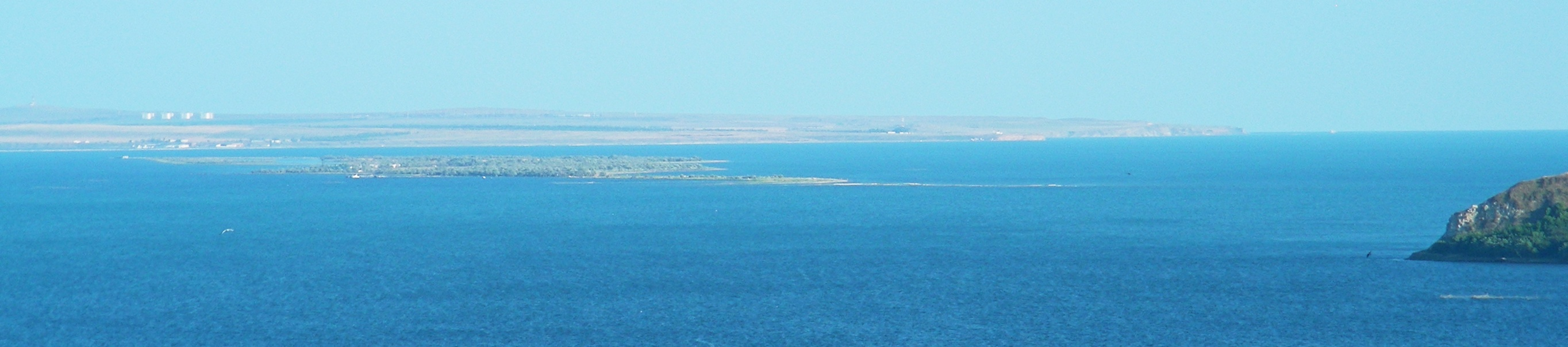
Tuzla island (center). View from Mount Mithridat (Kerch, Crimea).

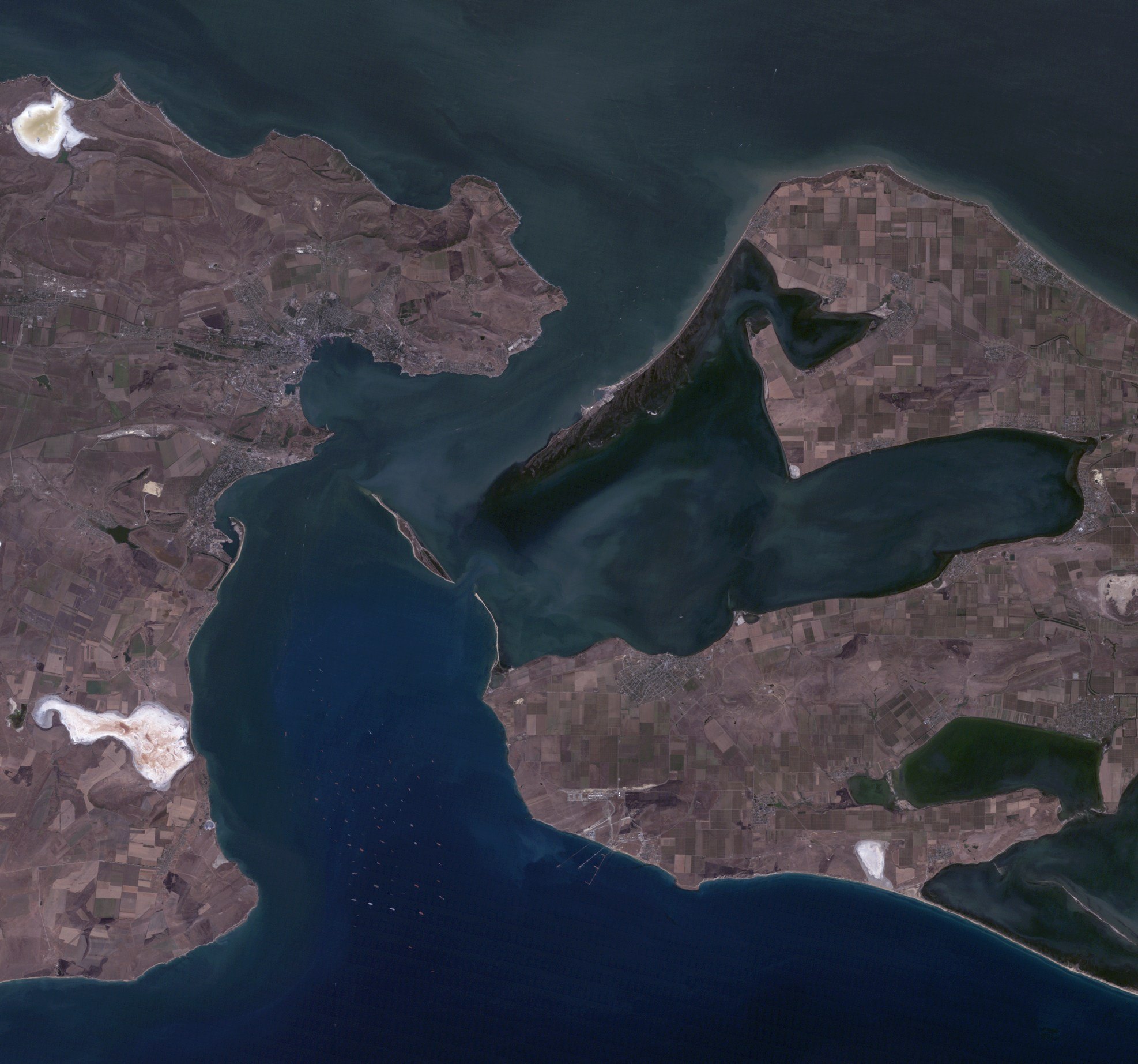
Kerch Strait in 2011 depicting an extensive landform that appears to stretch from the Russian coast towards the island

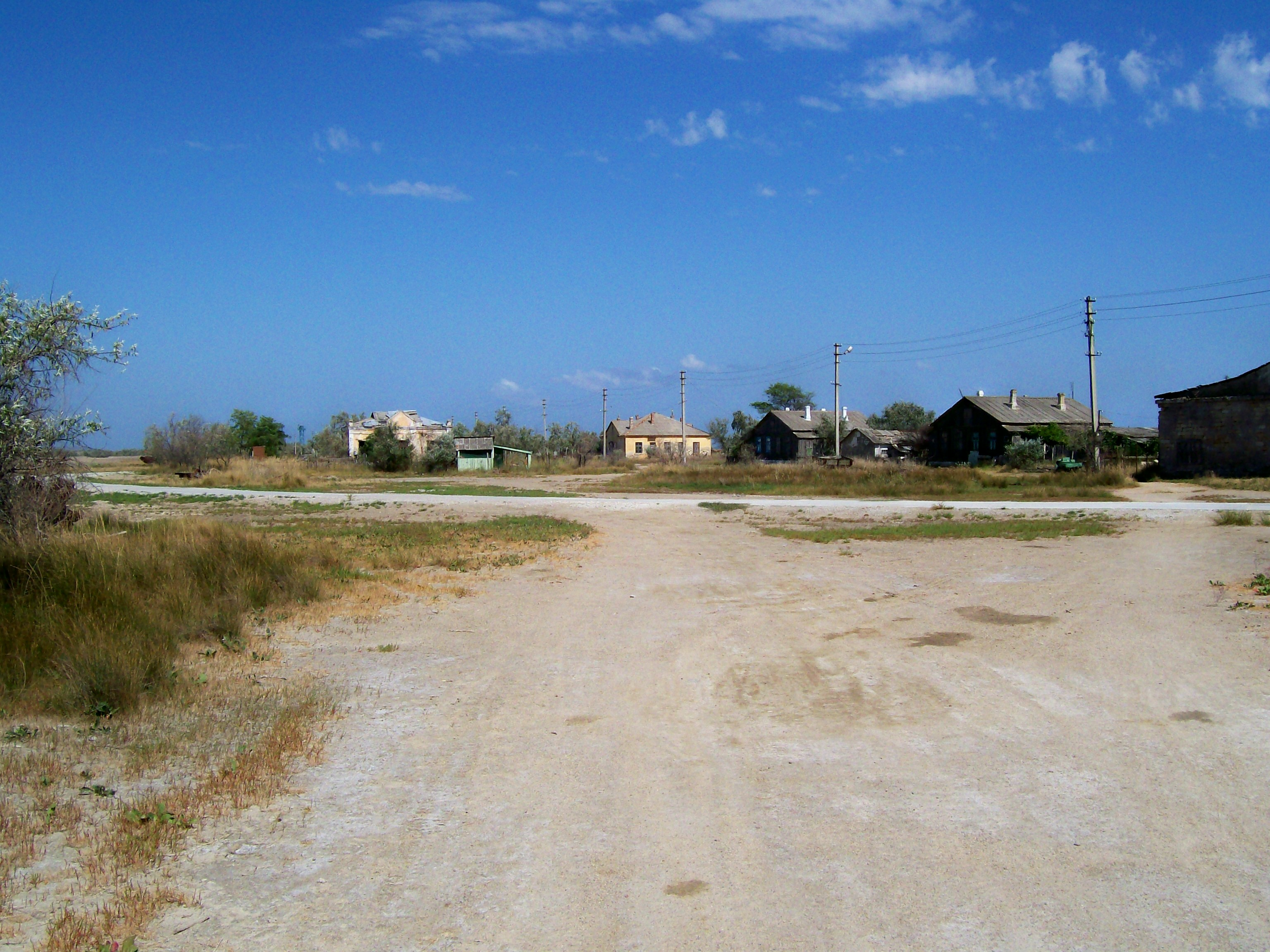
Fishing settlement at Tuzla in 2007

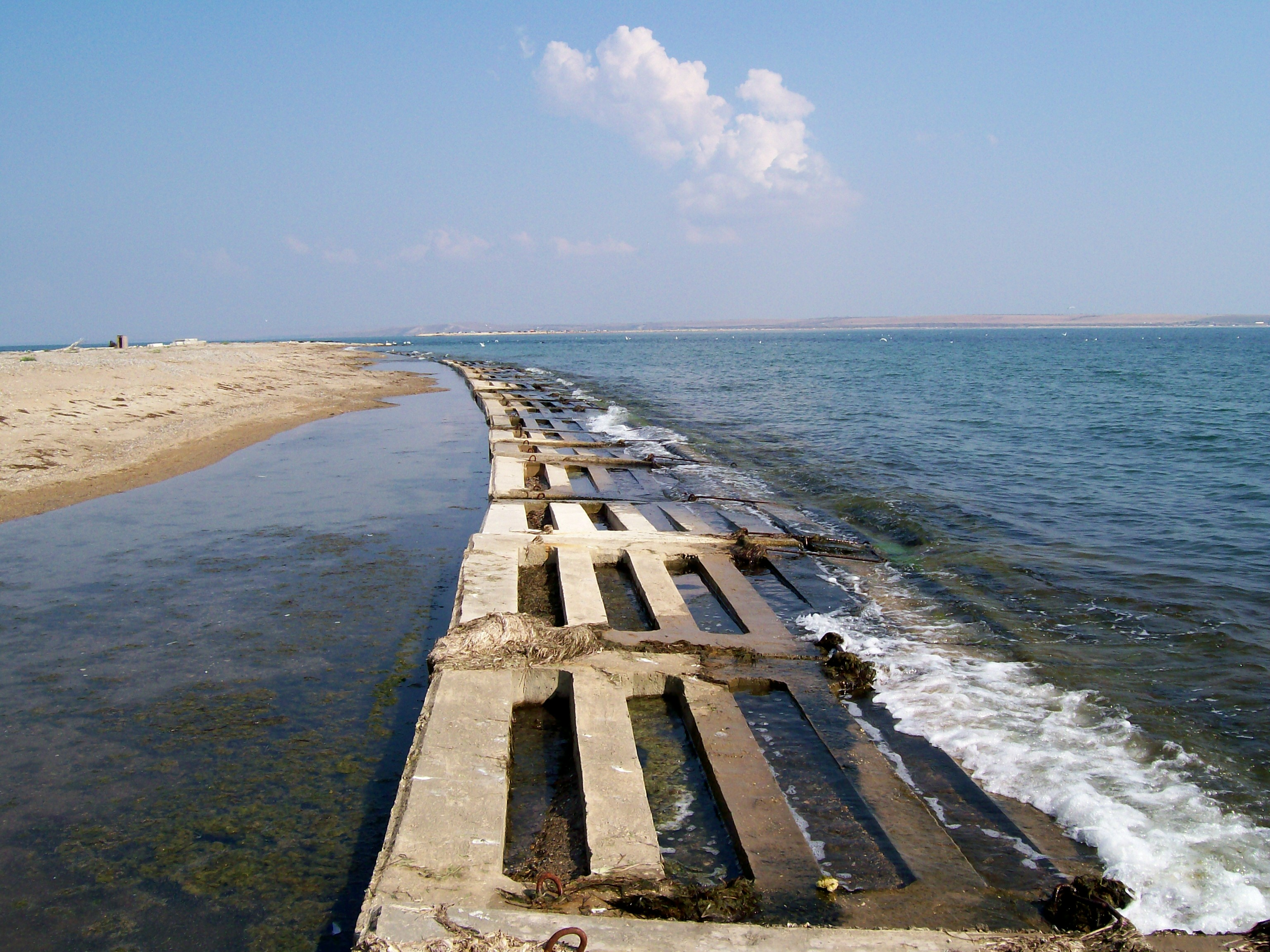
Tuzla island reinforcement structures (2007)

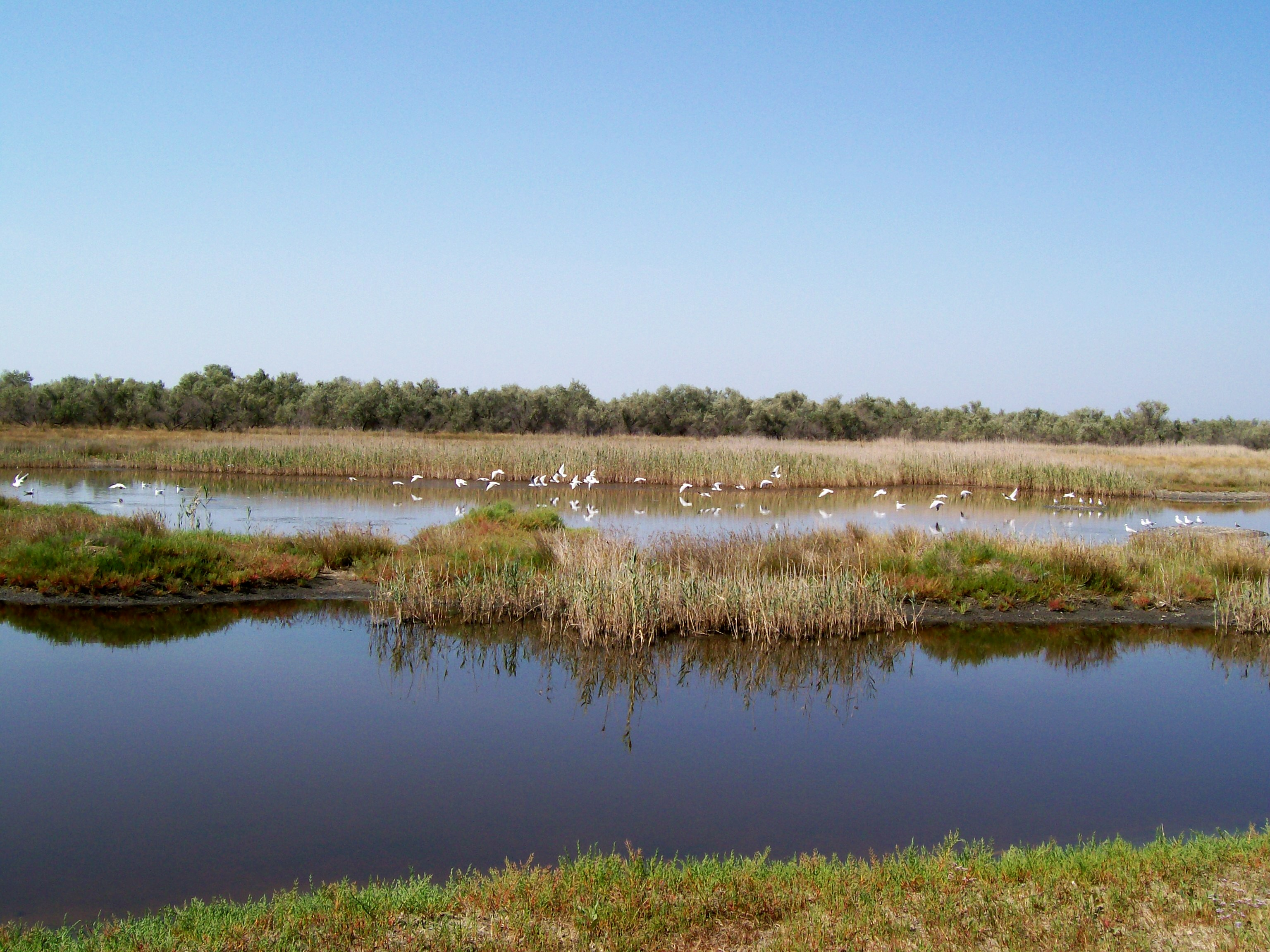
Inner lakes at Tuzla (2007)

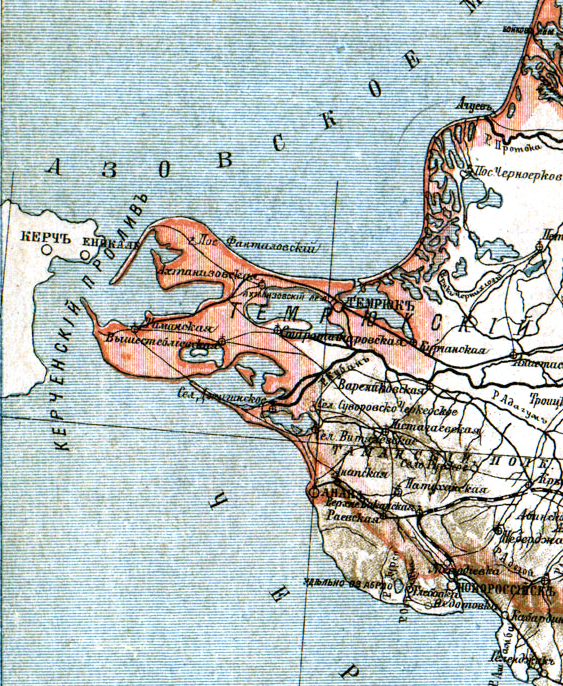
Tuzla Spit on a 19th-century map of the Kuban region

== See also ==
- List of islands of Ukraine
- Tuzla Spit
