= Kerch Strait =

Strait connecting the Black Sea and the Sea of Azov

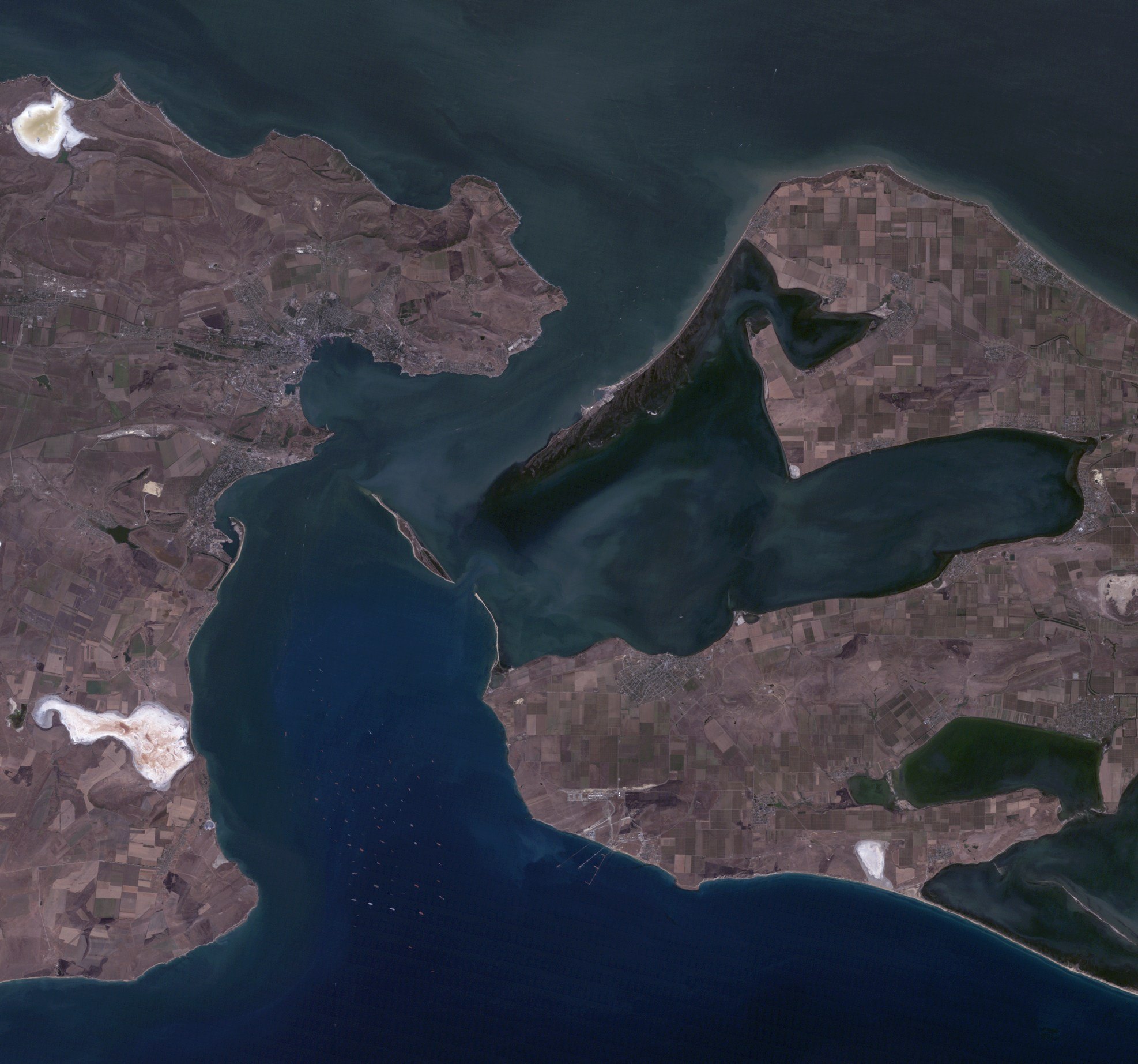
- August 2011 landsat satellite photo

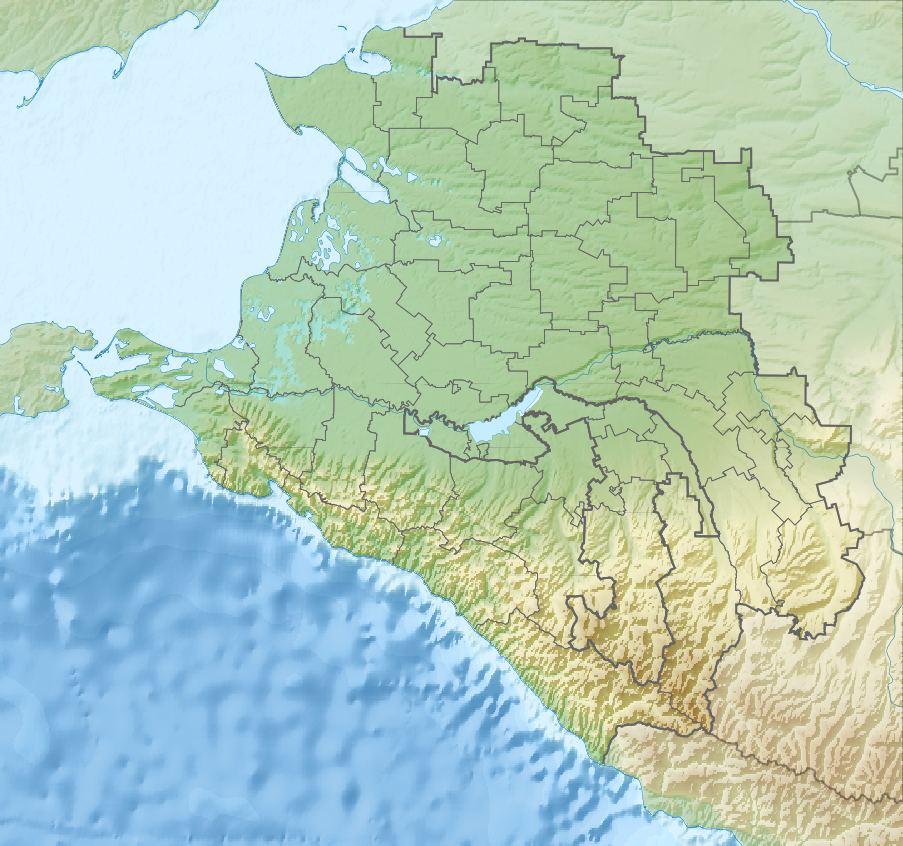
- Location within Europe Location within European Russia Location within Crimea Location within Krasnodar Krai
- Coordinates: 45°15′N 36°30′E
- Max. length: 35 km (22 mi)
- Max. width: 15 km (9.3 mi)
- Min. width: 3.1 km (1.9 mi)
- Average depth: 18 m (59 ft)
- Islands: Tuzla Island

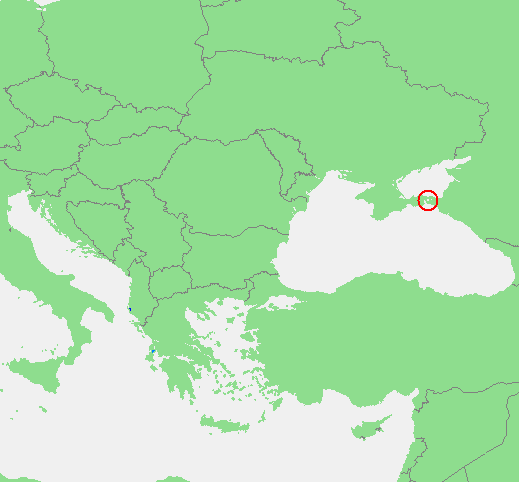
Location of Kerch Strait

The Kerch Strait (Note: Russian: Керченский пролив, romanized: Kerchenskiy proliv; Ukrainian: Керченська протока, romanized: Kerchenska protoka; Crimean Tatar: Keriç boğazı; Adyghe: Хы ТӀуалэ) is a strait in Eastern Europe. It connects the Black Sea and the Sea of Azov, separating the Kerch Peninsula of Crimea in the west from the Taman Peninsula of Russia's Krasnodar Krai in the east. The strait is 3.1 kilometres (1.9 mi) to 15 kilometres (9.3 mi) wide and up to 18 metres (59 ft) deep. The most important harbor, the Crimean city of Kerch, gives its name to the strait, formerly known as the Cimmerian Bosporus or Straits of Taman. It has also been called the Straits of Yenikale after the Yeni-Kale fortress in Kerch.

Taman, the most important settlement on the Taman Peninsula side of the strait, sits on Taman Bay, which is separated from the main Kerch Strait by the Chushka Spit to the north and the former Tuzla Spit to the south; the Tuzla Spit is now Tuzla Island, connected to the Taman Peninsula by a 2003 Russian-built 3.8-kilometre-long (2.4 mi) dam, and to mainland Crimea by the Crimean Bridge opened in 2018. A major cargo port is under construction near Taman.

== History ==
=== Greek and Roman records ===
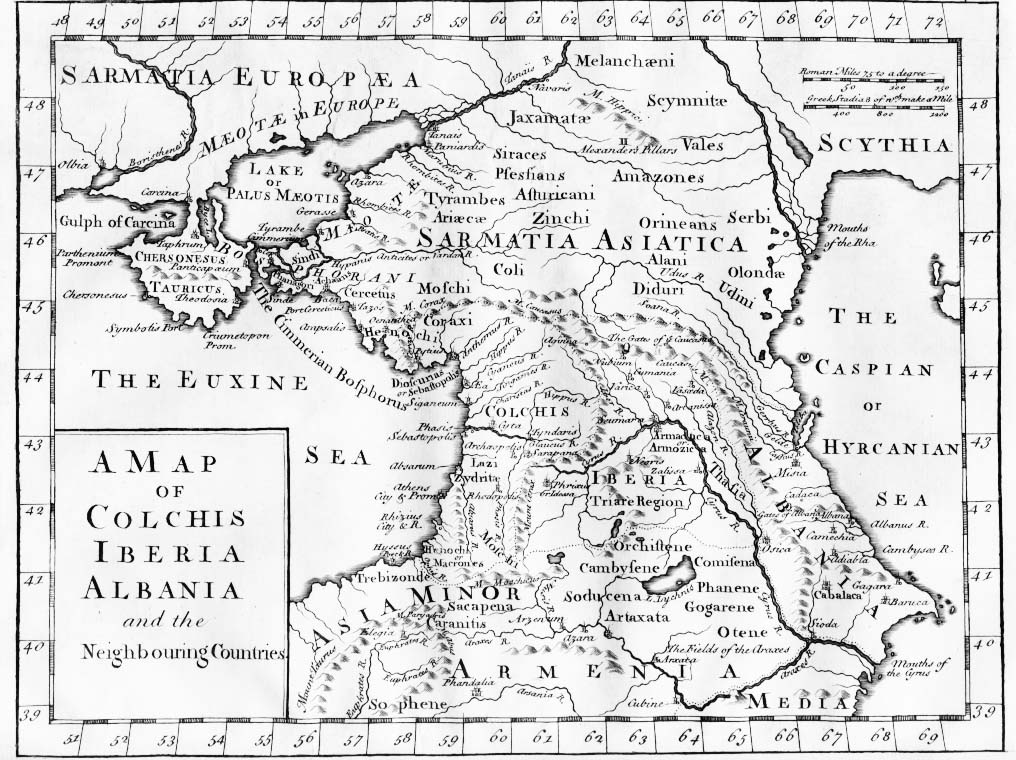
The "Cimmerian Bosphorus" of antiquity, shown on a map printed in London, c. 1770.

The straits are about 35 kilometers (22 mi) long and are 3.1 kilometers (1.9 mi) wide at the narrowest and separate an eastern extension of Crimea from Taman, the westernmost extension of the Caucasus Mountains. In antiquity, there seem to have been a group of islands intersected by arms of the Kuban River (Hypanis) and various sounds which have since silted up. The Romans knew the strait as the Cimmerian Bosporus (Cimmerius Bosporus) from its Greek name, the Cimmerian Strait (Κιμμέριος Βόσπορος, Kimmérios Bosporos), which honored the Cimmerians, nearby steppe nomads. In ancient times the low-lying land near the Strait was known as the Maeotic Swamp.

The Cimmerian Bosporus in ancient times was regarded as separating Europe from Asia, just as the Thracian Bosporus did. Most geographers, such as Posidonius, Strabo (Geographica 11.7.4), and Ptolemy, considered the boundary between Europe and Asia to be the river Tanais (Don), which flows into the Sea of Azov from the north; an alternative view, found in the poet Cornelius Gallus was that it was the river Hypanis (Kuban), which flows into the Sea of Azov from the east, close to the Cimmerian Bosporus.

=== Early modern period ===
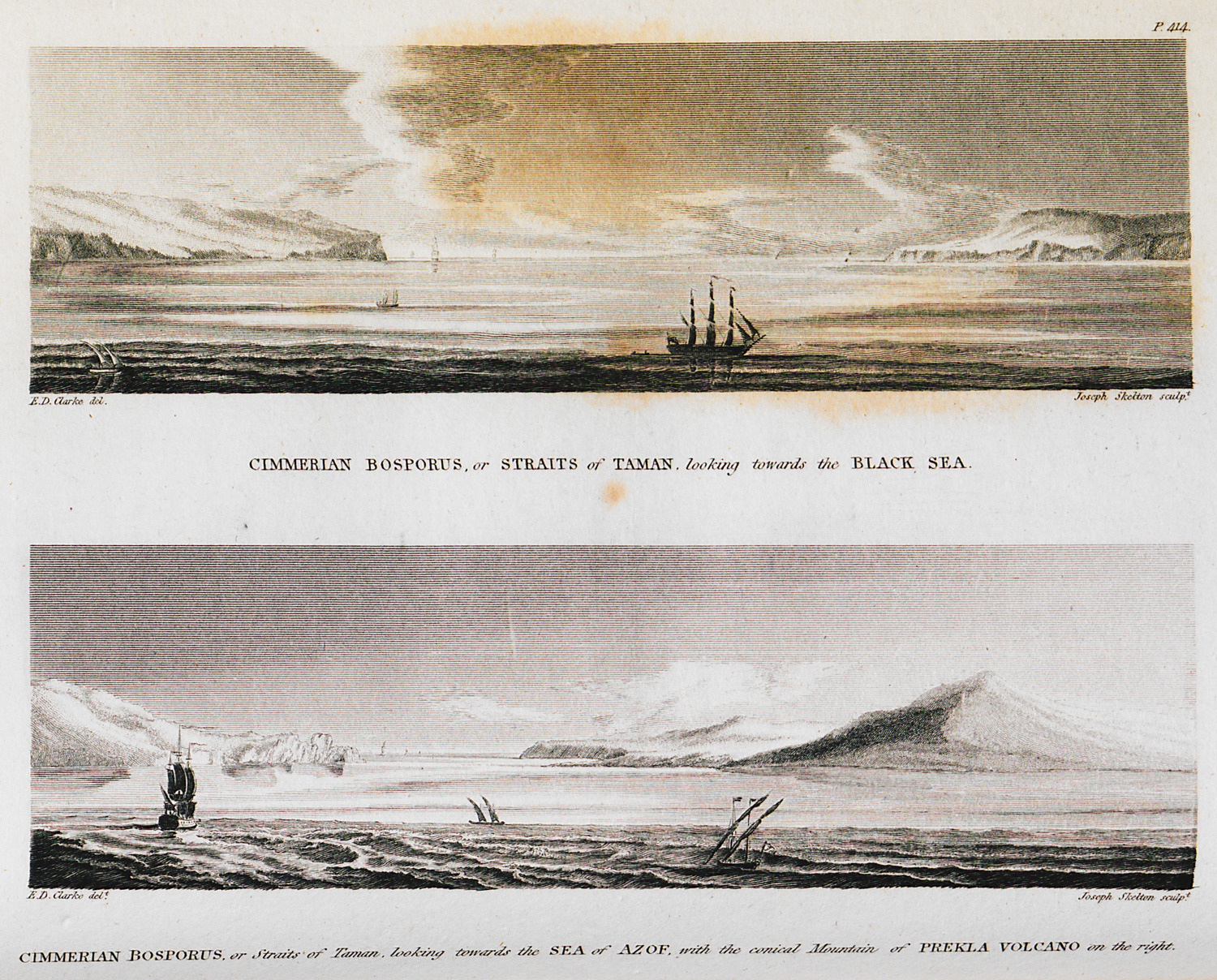
Views of the Cimmerian Bosporus, or Straits of Taman, as drawn by Edward Daniel Clarke c. 1801

The Kerch Strait was a nearby site of a major naval battle (that became known as the Battle of Kerch Strait) in the Russo-Turkish War (1787–1792). It was fought in 1790 and ended in Russian victory. In 1859, Hermann von Paucker built an examplary land battery on the strait.

=== Second World War ===
In the Second World War, the Kerch Peninsula became the scene of much desperate combat between forces of the Soviet Red Army and Nazi Germany. Fighting frequency intensified in the coldest months of year when the strait froze over, allowing the movement of troops over the ice.

After the Eastern Front stabilized in early 1943, Hitler ordered the construction of a 4.8-kilometre (3.0 mi) road-and-rail bridge across the Strait of Kerch in the spring of 1943 to support his desire for a renewed offensive to the Caucasus. The cable railway (aerial tramway), which went into operation on 14 June 1943 with a daily capacity of one thousand tons, was only adequate for the defensive needs of the Seventeenth Army in the Kuban bridgehead. Because of frequent earth tremors, this bridge would have required vast quantities of extra-strength steel girders, and their transport would have curtailed shipments of military material to the Crimea. The bridge was never completed, and the Wehrmacht finished evacuating the Kuban bridgehead in September 1943.

In 1944 the Soviets built a "provisional" railway bridge (Kerch railway bridge) across the strait. Construction made use of supplies captured from the Germans. The bridge went into operation in November 1944, but moving ice floes destroyed it in February 1945; reconstruction was not attempted.

=== Post-war ferry service ===
After the war, ferry transportation across the strait was established in 1954, connecting Crimea and the Krasnodar Krai (Port Krym – Port Kavkaz line). Originally there were four train ferry ships; later three car-ferry ships were added. Train transportation continued for almost 40 years. The aging train-ferries became obsolete in the late 1980s and were removed from service. In the autumn of 2004, new ships were delivered as replacements and train transportation was re-established. The ferry line stopped operations in late 2020.

=== Dispute and naval treaty of 2003 ===
A territorial dispute between Russia and Ukraine in 2003 centred on Tuzla Island in the Strait of Kerch. Ukraine and Russia agreed to treat the strait and the Azov Sea as shared internal waters.

=== Storm of November 2007 ===
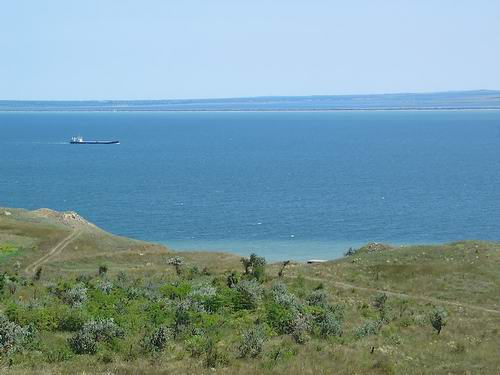
View from the Crimean coast in 2003

On Sunday, 11 November 2007, news agencies reported a very strong storm on the Black Sea. Four ships sank, six ran aground on a sandbank, and two tankers were damaged, resulting in a major oil spill and the death of 23 sailors.

The Russian oil tanker Volgoneft-139 sought shelter in the Kerch Strait from the above storm. In the storm, the tanker broke in two, releasing more than 2,000 tonnes of fuel oil. Four other ships sank in the storm, resulting in the release of sulphur cargo. The storm hampered efforts to rescue crew members. Another victim of the storm, the Russian cargo ship Volnogorsk, loaded with sulphur, sank at Port Kavkaz on the same day.

=== Russo-Ukrainian War since 2014 ===
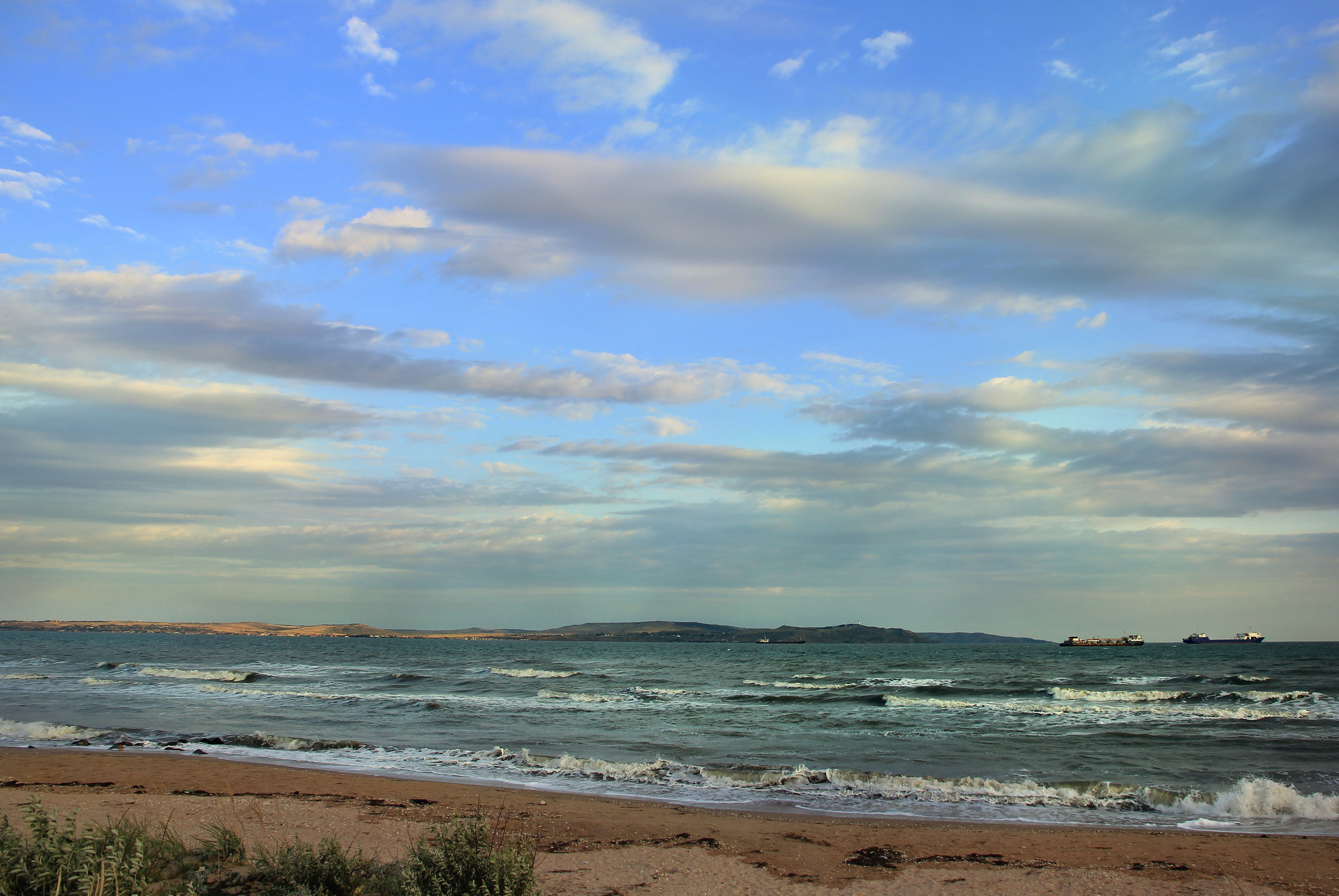
View northwest from Tuzla Island towards Port Krym in 2014. The strait is about 5 km wide at this point.

Russia and Ukraine agreed to guarantee each other freedom of navigation for ships of both nations in a 2003 naval treaty. Since the start of the Russo-Ukrainian War and the annexation of Crimea in 2014, however, Russian forces have forcibly established a new status quo, now being the straits' sole controlling power.

==== New bridge and naval blockade ====
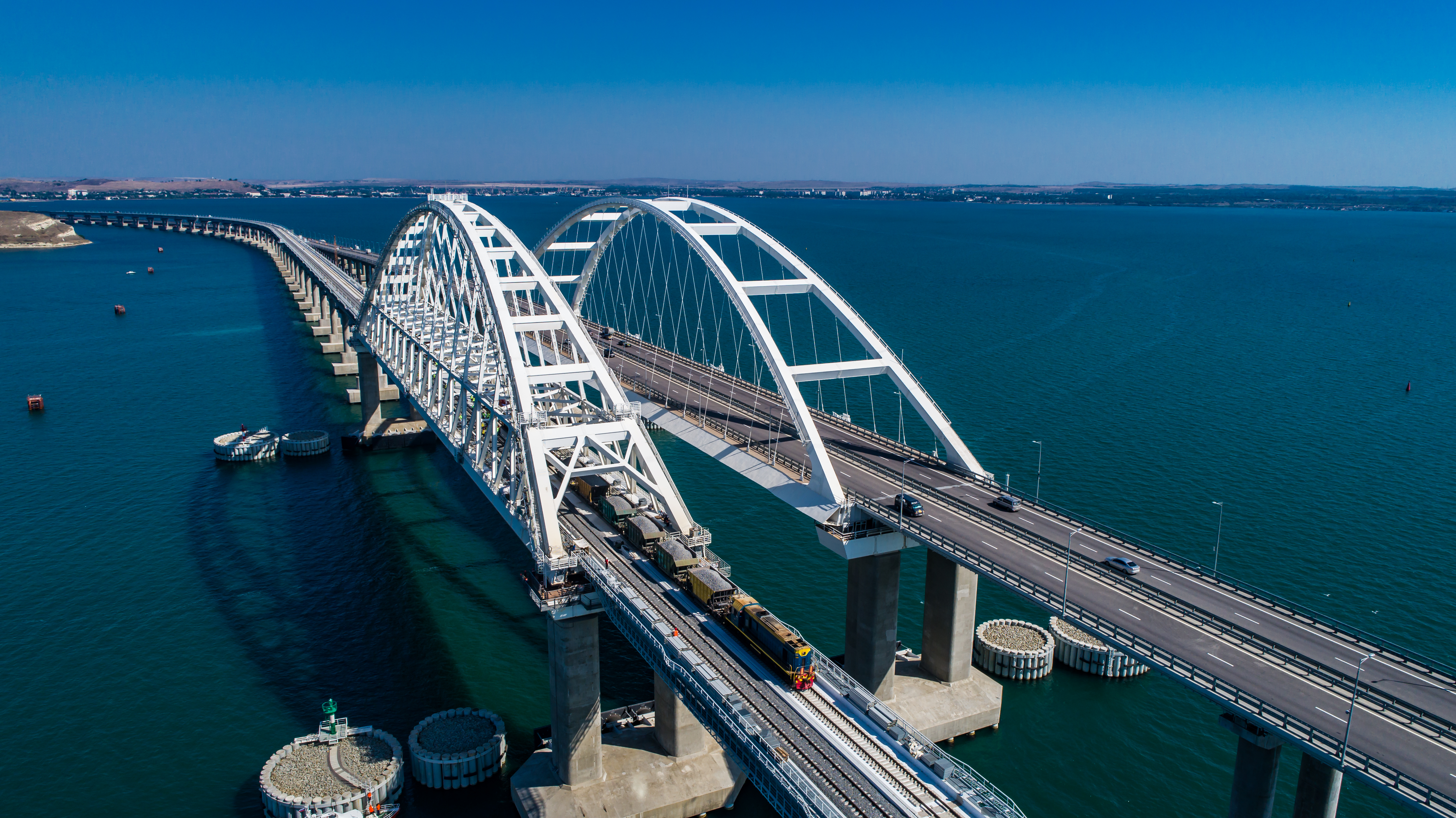
Crimean Bridge in 2019

Moscow mayor Yuri Luzhkov campaigned for a highway bridge to be constructed across the strait. Since 1944, various bridge projects to span the strait have been proposed or attempted, always hampered by the difficult geologic and geographic configuration of the area. Construction of an approach was actually started in 2003 with the 3.8 kilometres (2.4 mi)-long dam, provoking the 2003 Tuzla Island conflict.

After the 2014 Russian annexation of Crimea the government of Russia decided to build a bridge across the Kerch Strait. The 19-kilometre Crimean Bridge opened to road traffic in 2018 and the rail section opened in 2019.

Russian state-backed media claims that construction of the bridge caused increases in nutrients and planktons in the waters, attracting large numbers of fish and more than 1,000 endangered Black Sea bottlenose dolphins. However, Ukraine claims that the acoustic noise and pollution from both the bridge construction and military exercises may actually be killing Black Sea dolphins.

==== Kerch Strait incident (2018) ====
When two Ukrainian navy vessels tried to pass under the bridge to reach Mariupol in November 2018, Russian forces responded by blocking the straits with a large container ship. Upon turning back, the Ukrainian ships and crews were fired upon and seized by the Russian coast guard.

==== 2019 gas tanker disaster ====
Two gas carriers collided and exploded in 2019, killing 14 people.

==== 2021 closure by Russia ====
On 15 April 2021 Russia decided to close the area of Kerch Strait to "warships and other state vessels" from 24 April to 31 October. The stated rationale for the closure are military exercises. The closure partially cut off the Ukrainian ports of Berdyansk and Mariupol from the Black Sea. The Ukrainian Foreign Ministry protested against the decision, stating that "such actions by the Russian Federation are another attempt to violate the norms and principles of international law to usurp the sovereign rights of Ukraine as a coastal state, as Ukraine has the right to regulate navigation in these areas of the Black Sea". According to the Ukrainian Foreign Ministry, the decision is a violation of the freedom of navigation under the UN Convention on the Law of the Sea.

The decision to close the strait was preceded by Russia's warning the United States after the Biden administration's plan to send two destroyers (USS Roosevelt and USS Donald Cook) to the Black Sea amid Russia's increasing military presence near Ukraine. The Biden administration withheld the destroyers after fighting intensified between Ukrainian and Russian-backed separatist forces in an effort to alleviate the tension. Putin had threatened the safety of the US Navy ships, saying that they should stay away from the area “for their own good”. After the destroyers were withheld, Russia took advantage of the opening to close the Kerch Strait.

==== 2021 Donbas incident ====
On 9 December 2021 Ukrainian command ship Donbas left Mariupol and approached Kerch Strait. It did not give a notice in advance to pass the strait, and was warned by Russian coastguard such a notice should be given for the safety of maritime traffic. At the moment about 80 civilian ships were waiting to pass the strait.

==== Crimean Bridge explosions ====
In the morning of 8 October 2022 at 06:07 (Moscow time), an explosion occurred on the road portion of the Crimean Bridge, causing major damage. Seven fuel cars of a passing railway train also ignited, causing an extensive fire on the parallel rail bridge, and two half-sections of the road bridge collapsed. On 17 July 2023, two suicide sea drones exploded underneath and damaged a span of the road bridge.

==== Crimean tunnel ====
In late 2023 The Washington Post reported that Russia, with the help of Chinese companies, was contemplating building a Crimean tunnel.

==== 2024 oil spill ====
On 15 December 2024, the Russian oil tankers Volgoneft-212 and Volgoneft-239 were damaged in a storm in the Kerch Strait, resulting in an oil spill. Volgoneft-212, which was carrying about 4,900 tonnes of oil, split in two, and the bow section sank. One crew member died of hypothermia, and the remaining 12 crew members were taken to hospital. Volgoneft-239, which was carrying about 4,300 tonnes of oil, became uncontrollable; drifted; and ran aground near the Port of Taman, Krasnodar Krai.

Efforts to rescue the crew of Volgoneft-239 were suspended overnight due to bad weather, but all crew members were rescued the next day. It was also found that day that Volgoneft-239 had begun leaking oil after she ran aground, but both leaks stopped that day. Oil spills from both ships began drifting towards the coast northwest of the port of Taman between the Tuzla Spit and Cape Panagiya.

== Kerch–Yenikale Canal ==
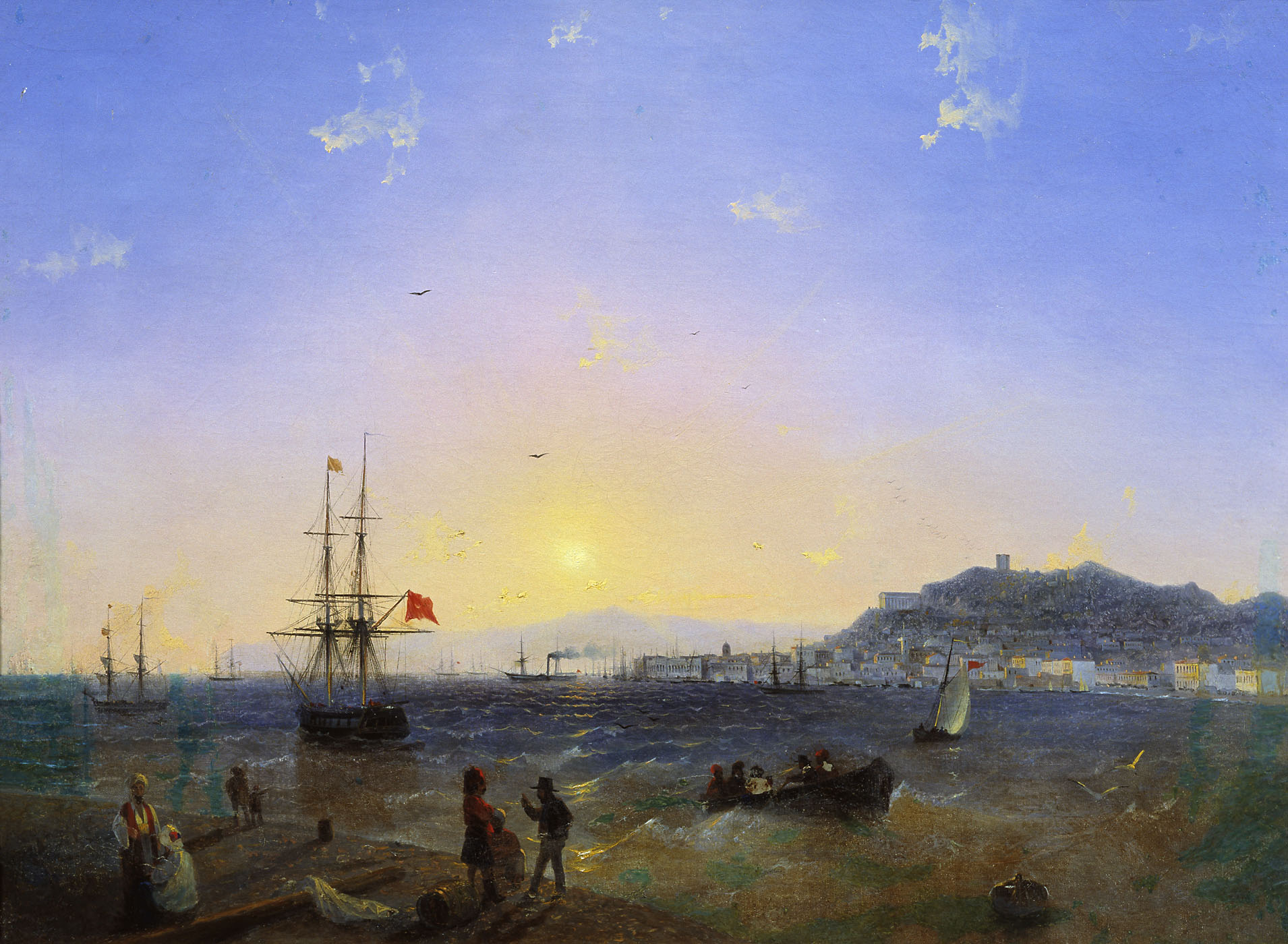
View across the strait in 1839, by Ivan Aivazovsky

In order to improve navigational capabilities of the Strait of Kerch, which is quite shallow in its narrowest point, the Kerch–Yenikale Canal was dredged through the strait. The main channel can accommodate vessels up to 215 meters long with a draft of up to 8 meters with a compulsory pilot assistance. The canal is not straight, and its geometry further complicates safe navigation. The narrowness, limited depth, and turns of the main channel together with the often unpredictable effects of wind and visibility (fog) mean that there are strict procedures regulating strait transit. Transit of large vessels occurs on a one-way (alternating) group convoy basis. Transit procedures have remained unchanged, whether under Soviet, Ukrainian, or Russian jurisdiction. The Vessel Traffic Control Post in Kerch controls and oversees all traffic.

== Fishing ==
Several fish-processing plants are located on the Crimean coast of the strait. The fishing season begins in late autumn and lasts for 2 to 3 months, when many seiners put out into the strait to fish. The Taman Bay is a major fishing ground, with many fishing villages scattered along the coast.
