= Taman Peninsula =

Peninsula in Russia

- Peninsula
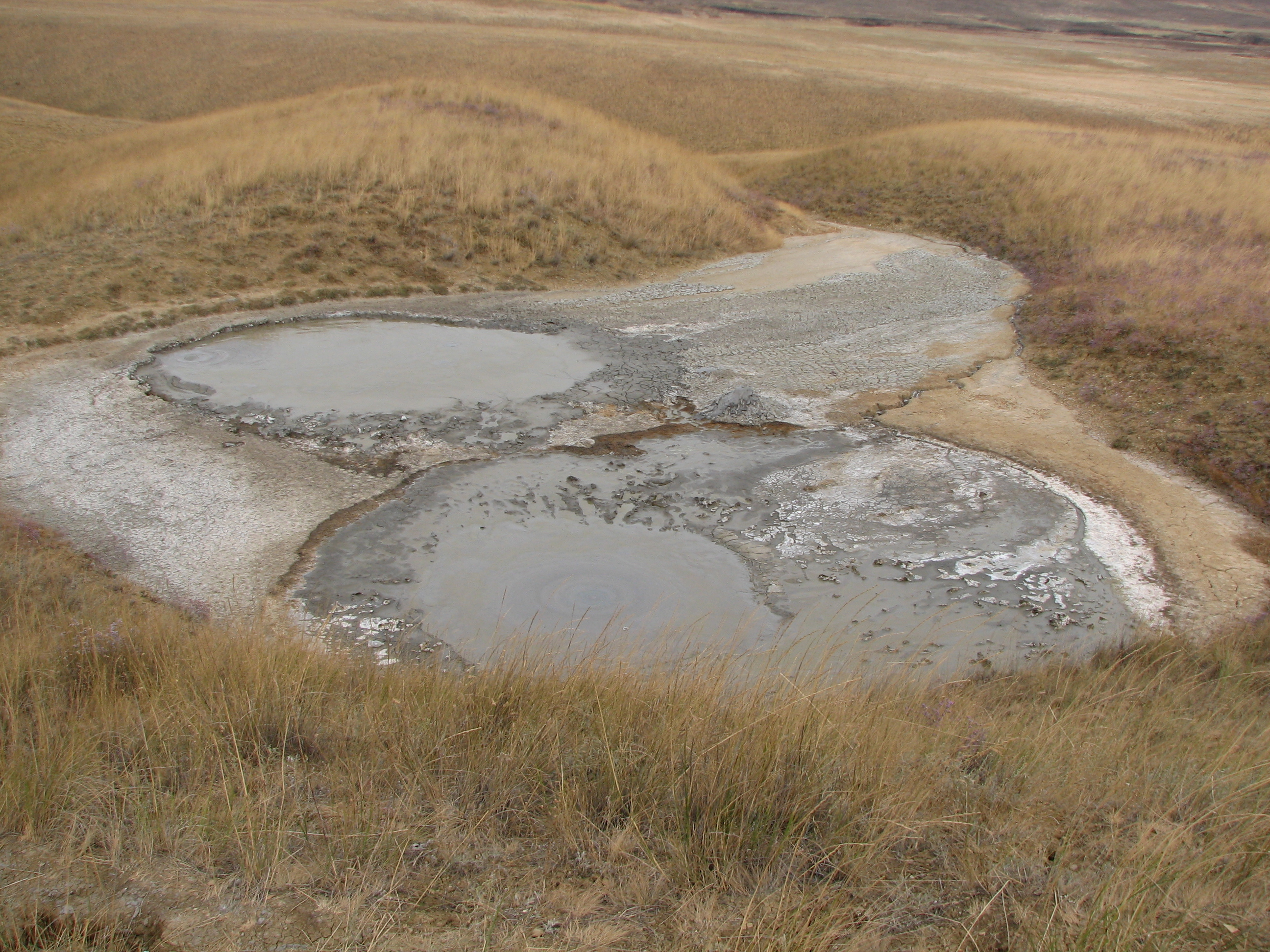
- A typical mud volcano near the village of Taman

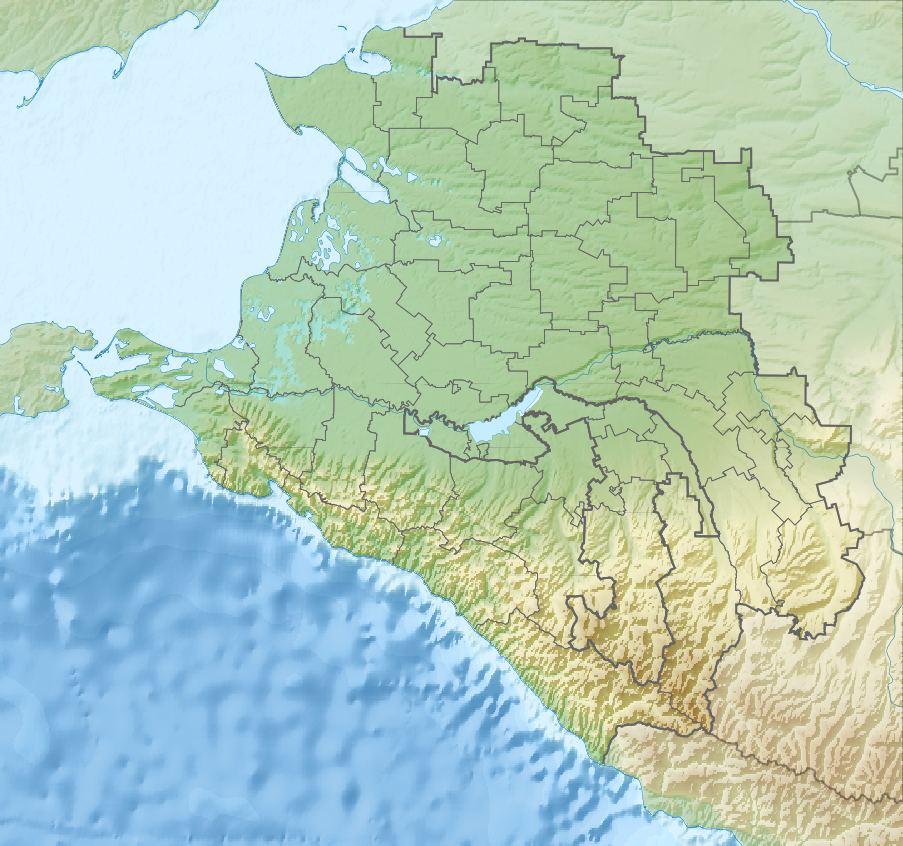
- Location within Krasnodar Krai Location within European Russia
- Coordinates: 45°12′N 37°12′E
- Location: Krasnodar Krai, Russia

The Taman Peninsula (Russian: Таманский полуостров, IPA: [tɐˈmanskʲɪj pəlʊˈostrəf]) is a peninsula in Krasnodar Krai, Russia, which borders the Sea of Azov to the north, the Kerch Strait to the west and the Black Sea to the south.

== Toponym ==
One version of the origin of the name "Taman" claims its Circassian origin from "temen", a swamp that corresponds to the nature of the area.

== History ==
The area has evolved over the past two millennia from a chain of islands into today's peninsula. In ancient times the peninsula was known to the Greeks as Sindikè chersònesus (Greek: Σινδική χερσόνησος, peninsula of the Sindi) and Pontic Greek colonies of Hermonassa and Phanagoria stood on the peninsula, as did the later city of Tmutarakan.

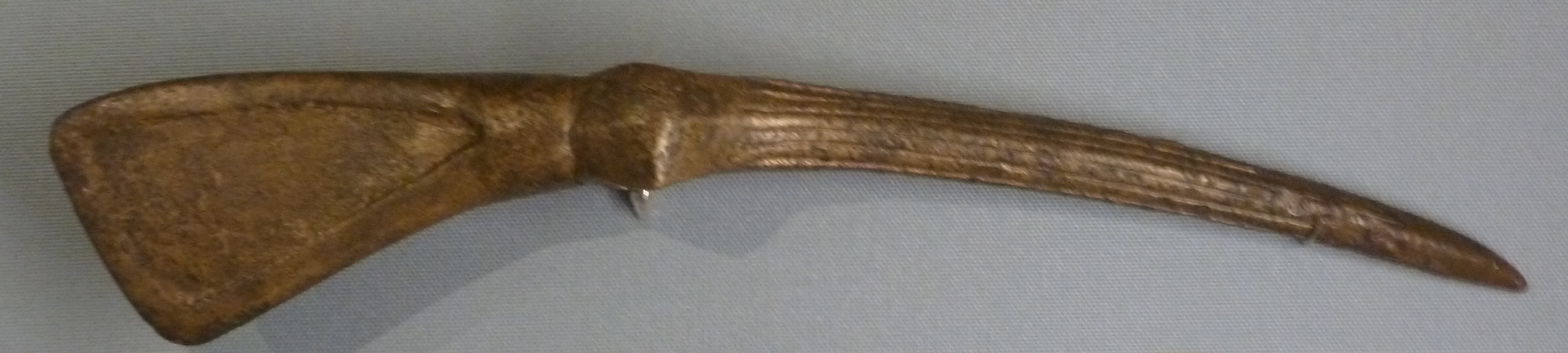
Bronze Axe, 6th century BC, Taman peninsula, as of 2014 at the Hermitage Museum

The Maeotae and Sindi settled in the area from ancient times. In the classical period it became part of the Bosporan kingdom; its inhabitants included Sarmatians, Greeks, Anatolian settlers from Pontus, and Jews. In the 4th century CE the area fell to the Huns; it was later the capital of Great Bulgaria and fell to the Khazars in the mid-7th century. Following the breakup of the Khazar Khaganate in c. 969, the peninsula formed part of a Khazar Jewish successor state under a ruler named David. By the late 980s, it came largely into the possession of the Kievan Rus and of the Russian Principality of Tmutarakan before falling to the Kipchaks c. 1100. The Mongols seized the area in 1239 and it became a possession of Genoa, along with Gazaria in Crimea, in 1419.

For most of the 15th century, the Guizolfi (Ghisolfi) family, founded by the Genoese Jew Simeone de Guizolfi, ruled the peninsula on behalf of Gazaria. The rulership of the region by Jewish consuls, commissioners or princes has sparked much debate over the extent to which Khazar Judaism survived in southern Russia during this period. The Khanate of Crimea seized the Taman Peninsula in 1483. It fell to the Ottoman Empire in 1783 and became an Ottoman Sanjak under the Eyalet of Kaffa. In 1791, during the Russo-Turkish War (1787–92), it passed into the control of the Russian Empire. Russia ceded it back to the Ottomans in 1792. It finally passed to Russia in 1828. For much of the succeeding century, the area was sparsely populated. The largest settlement was the Cossack town (later a stanitsa) of Taman, succeeded by the port town of Temryuk in modern times.

The peninsula contains small mud volcanoes and deposits of natural gas and petroleum. Shallow desalinated lakes and local estuaries inhabited by fish and game, overgrown with thick reeds of the shore, create a swampy, impassable area.

Mikhail Lermontov disparagingly describes the town of Taman in his 1840 novel, A Hero of Our Time.

The German Wehrmacht and the Romanian Army occupied the Taman Peninsula in 1942; the Soviet Red Army recovered it in 1943. The story of the 1977 film Cross of Iron revolves around conflicts that arise within the leadership of a Wehrmacht regiment during the German retreat from the Kuban bridgehead.

In 2018, archaeologists discovered the remains of ancient Greek musical instruments, a harp and a lyre. The instruments were discovered while examining an ancient necropolis located near the Volna settlement. Archaeologists say that a Greek polis existed there from the second quarter of the 6th century BC to the 4th century AD, which belonged to the Bosporan Kingdom.
