= Dolzhanskaya =

Dolzhanskaya Должанская
- Stanitsa
- Flag
- Interactive map of Dolzhanskaya
- Location of Dolzhanskaya Dolzhanskaya (Krasnodar Krai)
- Coordinates: 46.6333°N 37.8°E
- Country: Russia
- Federal subject: Krasnodar Krai
- Administrative district: Yeysky District
- Founded: 1848
- Elevation: 5 m (16 ft)

Population
  - Estimate (2023): 6,657 )
- Time zone: UTC+3 (MSK)
- Postal codes: 353655, 353656
- OKTMO ID: 03616404101

Dolzhanskaya (Russian: Должа́нская) is a rural locality (a stanitsa) in Yeysky District of Krasnodar Krai, Russia, located on the coast of the Azov Sea, at the base of Dolgaya Spit. Population: 7,019 (2010 census); 7,102 (2002 census).

It is a popular windsurfing location. It has mineral waters and mud with alleged medical properties.
