= Dolgaya Spit =

Sandbar in the Sea of Azov

Dolgaya Spit Kosa Dolgaya
- Spit
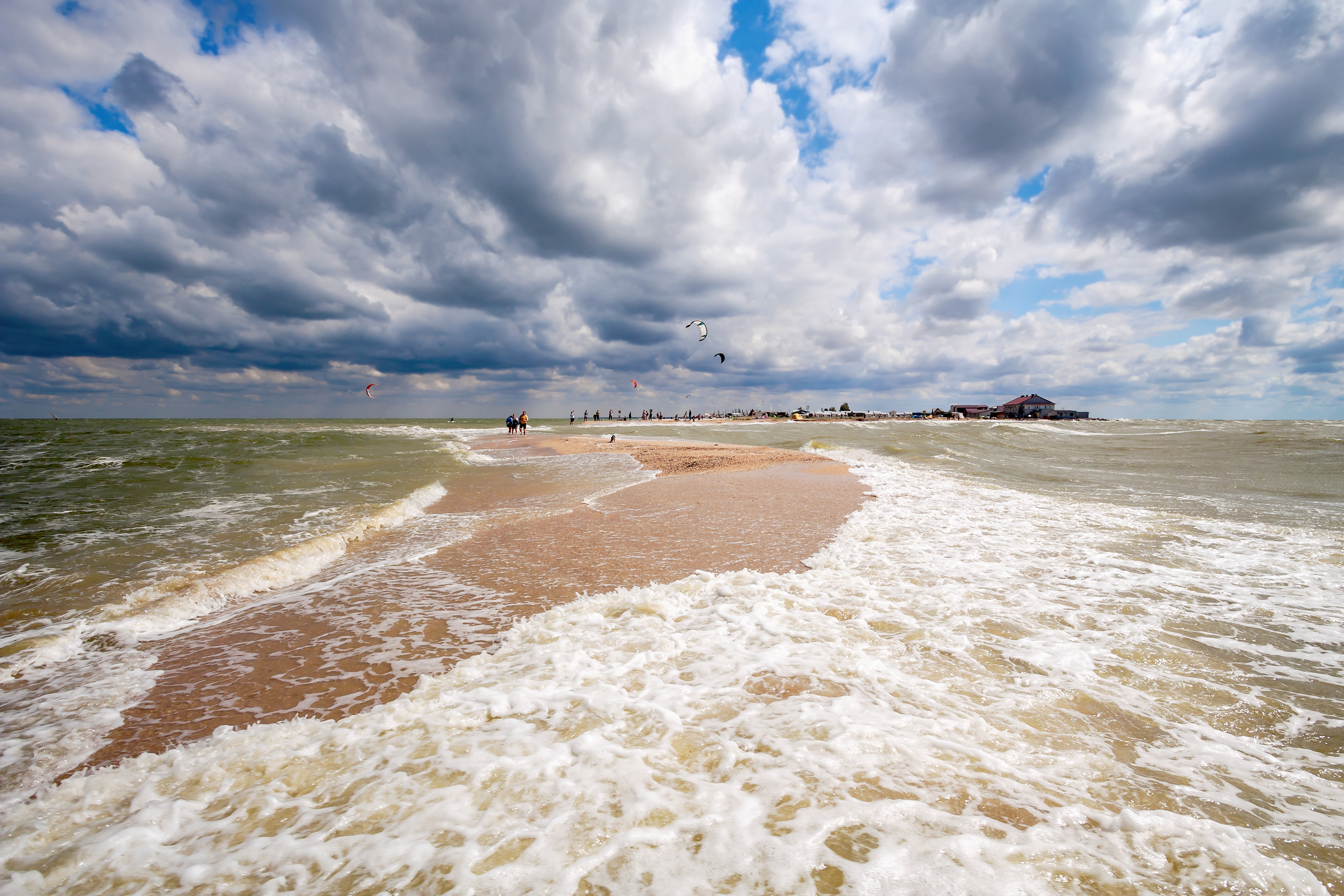
- Dolgaya Spit in the Sea of Azov.

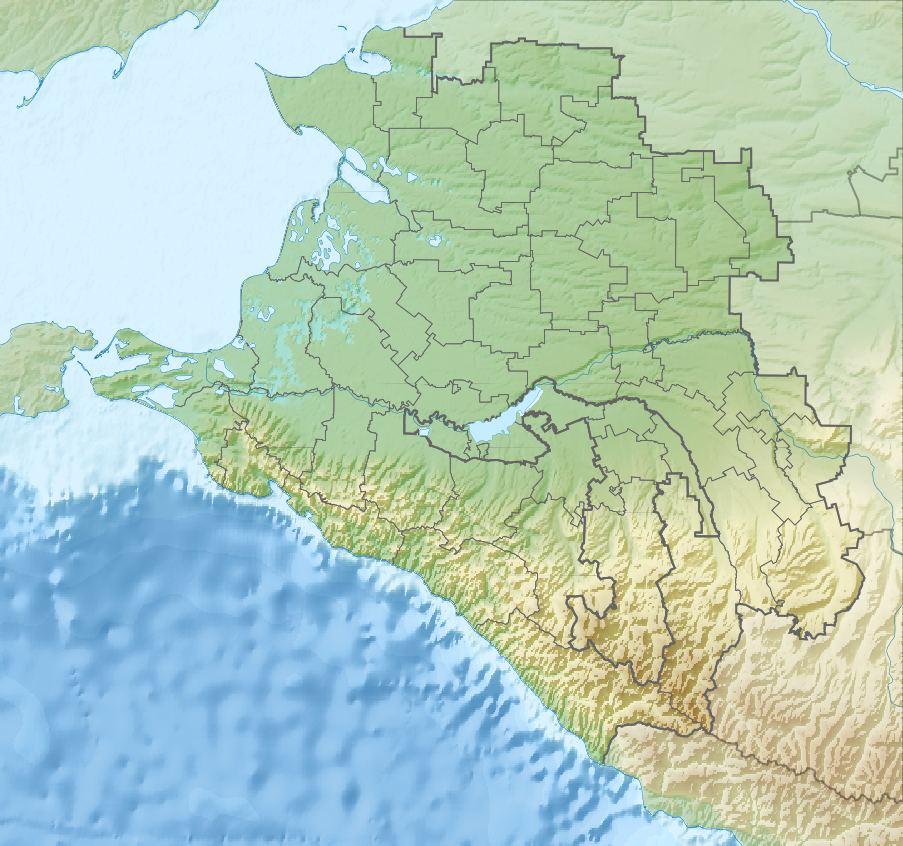
- Location within Krasnodar Krai Location within Black Sea
- Interactive map of Dolgaya Spit
- Coordinates: 46°39′35″N 37°46′00″E
- Location: Krasnodar Krai, Russia

Dimensions
  - Length: 17 kilometres (11 mi)
  - Width: 0.5 kilometres (0.31 mi)
- IUCN category III (natural monument or feature)
- Area: 1.9 km^{2} (0.73 sq mi)
- Established: 1988

The Dolgaya Spit or Kosa Dolgaya (Russian: Коса Долгая) is a sandy spit in the Sea of Azov. The length is 17 kilometres (11 mi), and the width is about 500 m. The spit is located in Yeysky District of Krasnodar Krai, Russia. It separates Taganrog Bay from the Sea of Azov.

Dolgaya Spit is a landscape nature sanctuary of Krasnodar Krai with unique sandy beaches, quite deep sea, fresh-water lakes, rich animal world and flora.

Dolzhanskaya village is located at the basis of Dolgaya Spit.

== See also ==
- Spits of the Sea of Azov
- Yeysk Spit
