= Grey area =

Grey area or gray area may refer to:

== Music ==
- The Grey Area (Mute), a record label
- Grey Area (album), a 2019 album by Little Simz
- The Grey Area (album), a 2003 album by Onry Ozzborn
- "Gray Area", a song by Kaytranada from Bubba, 2019

== Art ==
- Gray Area Foundation for the Arts, a media arts organization and exhibition space in San Francisco
- Grey Area (gallery), an art project in Paris

== Other uses ==
- Grey Area (short story collection), a collection of short stories by Will Self
- Grey Area, a gaming company known for Shadow Cities
- The Grey Area (film), a 2012 documentary film
- Gray Areas, a subculture magazine

== See also ==
- Grey zone (disambiguation)
- Shades of gray (disambiguation)
- Splitting (psychology)
