= Grey-zone (international relations) =

State between peace and war

The grey-zone (also grey zone, gray zone, and gray-zone) describes the space in between peace and war in which state and non-state actors engage in competition.

== Definition ==
Use of the term grey-zone is widespread in national security circles, but there is no universal agreement on the definition of grey-zone, or even whether it is a useful term, with views about the term ranging from "faddish" or "vague", to "useful" or "brilliant".

The grey-zone is defined as "competitive interactions among and within state and non-state actors that fall between the traditional war and peace duality." by the United States Special Operations Command. A key element of operations within the grey-zone is that they remain below the threshold of an attack which could have a legitimate conventional military response (jus ad bellum). One paper defined it as "coercive statecraft actions short of war", and a "mainly non-military domain of human activity in which states use national resources to deliberately coerce other states". The Center for Strategic and International Studies defines the grey-zone as "the contested arena somewhere between routine statecraft and open warfare." British Defence Secretary Ben Wallace called the grey-zone "that limbo land between peace and war."

Grey zone warfare generally means a middle, unclear space that exists between direct conflict and peace in international relations.

According to Vincent Cable, examples of grey-zone activities include undermining industrial value chains or oil and gas supplies, money laundering, and the use of espionage and sabotage. According to Lee Hsi-ming "gray zone conflict is characterized by using the threat of force to create fear and intimidation." US Navy admiral Samuel Paparo has termed gray zone activities "illegal, coercive, aggressive and deceptive" (ICAP) following the preferred term of Romeo Brawner Jr.

== History ==
The term grey-zone was coined by the United States Special Operations Command and published in a 2015 white paper. The concept of the grey-zone is built on existing military strategies; however, information technology has created radical new spaces which have expanded what is possible. Modern hybrid warfare and political warfare operations primarily occur in the grey-zone.

In the late 2010s, China escalated to grey-zone warfare with Taiwan in an attempt to force unification with the smaller country. Taiwan's Coast Guard Administration has had to expand rapidly to meet the rising grey-zone challenge. China's grey-zone operations against Taiwan in the maritime domain are meant to establish presence while maintaining plausible deniability. The Center for Strategic and International Studies assesses that China uses civilian vessels as part of its grey-zone campaign against Taiwan.

== Concerns ==
It is generally believed that non-democratic states can operate more effectively in the grey-zone as they are much less limited by domestic law and regulation. It can also be very hard for democratic states to respond to grey-zone threats because their legal and military systems are geared towards seeing conflicts through the sense of war and peace with little preparation or consideration for anything in between. This can lead democratic states to either dramatically overreact or under-react when faced with a grey-zone challenge.

=== Relation with hybrid warfare ===
The concept of grey-zone conflicts or warfare is distinct from the concept of hybrid warfare, although the two are intimately linked as in the modern era states most often apply unconventional tools and hybrid techniques in the grey-zone. However many of the unconventional tools used by states in the grey-zone such as propaganda campaigns, economic pressure and the use of non-state entities do not cross over the threshold into formalized state-level aggression.

=== China's grey-zone tactics in the South China Sea ===
China has undertaken a grey-zone campaign in the South China Sea, adopting a "salami-slicing" philosophy, whereby they pursue consistent incremental gains which when viewed in isolation are too inconsequential to amount to large scale retaliatory measures, however when viewed in totality can amount to significant changes in the region.

The South China Sea is a highly contested region, with China, Taiwan, the Philippines, Malaysia, Brunei, and Vietnam all staking overlapping claims to the region. China has claimed that it has jurisdiction over the near entirety of the South China Sea, basing this claim on a historical 9-dash map which showed it to have such jurisdiction. However, this historical basis has been debated, conflicts with the United Nations Convention on the Law of the Sea (UNCLOS), and in a 2016 decision by the Permanent Court of Arbitration was held to have no legal basis in international law – China claims this decision to be null and void. China's main two tactics for furthering their interests in the South China Sea has been their artificial island creation and use of a maritime militia. These tactics have questionable legality under international law and have prompted criticism from other actors in the region. Despite this, these actions have not prompted an outbreak of war. Consequently, they fall within the "grey-zone".

==== Artificial island building ====
China's artificial island building is done by dredging up massive amounts of sand and gravel, dumping it on top of pre-existing reefs. China's land reclamation in the Spratly archipelago is estimated to have seen more than ten million cubic metres of sand transported to five reefs. China has created 3,200 acres of new land since 2013 in the South China Sea, and state media reports that over 5,000 people are stationed at the islands they occupy. The creation of these islands is not limited to the outskirts of China's Exclusive Economic Zone (EEZ) and has been largely problematic as it often comes within the EEZ of other states – for example as recently as May 2024 the Philippines noticed signs of land reclamation just 90 nautical miles off their coast (falling within the 200 nm EEZ that states enjoy under UNCLOS).

After creating these islands, China militarises them – radomes, gun turrets and close-in weapon systems for detecting and destroying incoming missiles and aircraft are common features on their artificial islands, and intelligence-gathering and submarine-hunting aircraft have been reported to "frequently operate from the airfield [in Fiery Cross]." The militarisation of these islands deters access by rival military forces in areas China claims, increases the projection of Chinese power, and allows its armed forces greater room for manoeuvre in the event of a military conflict (e.g. in a potential invasion of Taiwan).

==== Maritime militia ====
China has largely avoided directly employing PLA naval forces, instead employing civilian vessels controlled by fishermen to perform duties in disputed waters, "including patrolling, monitoring and attacking foreign fishing vessels." These civilian vessels make up China's maritime militia – they are operated by individuals who do not wear military uniform and also engage in regular fishing activities, blurring the line between military and civilian activities. So rather than the Chinese government being directly linked to the harassment of foreign vessels and the prevention of access to territorial waters and commercial activities, the civilian-employed maritime militia operates under the pretext that they are acting under their own directive and initiative to enforce maritime law.

Whilst the maritime militia is not officially linked to any government or state agency, "photos and video, data from ship-to-ship automatic identification systems and other tell-tale behaviour like 'rafting-up' by tying multiple boats together" have made it clear they are "organised, funded, and directed by the government of China". The goal of the militia is to "establish [Chinese] presence in disputed areas, swarm and overwhelm other claimants' activities, or reinforce Chinese presence claims under pressure."

China has used their maritime militia to take territory from states with competing claims in the South China Sea, employing what Major General Zhang Zhaozhong of the PLA has referred to as the "cabbage strategy". This is where the militia, sometimes in conjunction with naval forces will surround a contested area with so many boats that "the island is thus wrapped layer by layer like a cabbage."

General Zhang has touted the effectiveness of the cabbage strategy in taking land from the Philippines, saying "for those small islands, only a few troopers are able to station on each of them, but there is no food or even drinking water there. If we carry out the cabbage strategy, you will not be able to send food and drinking water onto the islands. Without the supply for one or two weeks, the troopers stationed there will leave the islands on their own. Once they have left, they will never be able to come back."

===== Whitsun Reef incident - March 2021 =====
The cabbage strategy was used in March 2021, when 220 Chinese fishing vessels anchored near Whitsun Reef, which belongs to the Philippines. The ships cited "rough weather" as their reason for anchoring. However, once surrounded China implemented an Anti-Access/Area Denial (A2/AD) strategy to effectively gain control of the territory.

===== BRP Sierra Madre incident - May 2013 =====
The cabbage strategy has also been used by other Chinese paramilitary forces such as the Chinese coast guard, who, in May 2013, went beyond the traditional mandate for a state's coast guard by surrounding and blocking supplies to the BRP Sierra Madre, a grounded Philippines ship which now serves as a makeshift military base in the Second Thomas Shoal. China has since continued a blockade around the base to prevent the ship from being repaired, in the hopes that the Philippines will eventually be forced to abandon using it as a base and retreat from the area.

===== HD-981 incident - 2014 =====
China has also used its maritime militia outside of cabbage strategy missions. The militia is known to harass vessels belonging to other states to make China's presence known, test the willingness of other states to respond, and potentially push the vessels of other states out of the region. In 2014, the HD-981 incident occurred, whereby the maritime militia (made up of coast guard vessels, transport ships, tugboats, and fishing vessels) was accompanied by naval ships to escort an oil rig from the China National Offshore Oil Corporation to waters falling within Vietnam's EEZ. The move prevented Vietnam's fishing vessels from fishing in their traditional fishing grounds within Vietnam's EEZ and allowed China to exploit Vietnam's EEZ for their own gain.

=== Responses to China's grey-zone tactics in the South China Sea ===
China's actions have prompted the cooperation of other states in the region to counter-balance China's influence - the Philippines and Vietnam have grown closer together to condemn China, and both are increasing their own artificial island construction (within their own EEZs). Vietnam added more than 692 acres of land between November 2023 and June 2024, which is more than they had added in the previous two years combined.

Even as Vietnam increases their artificial island building in the South China Sea, the Philippines has been content with this expansion, Philippine Navy Commodore Roy Vincent Trinidad stating, "Vietnam does not initiate illegal, coercive, aggressive and deceptive actions against us, unlike China." This sentiment was also echoed by Philippine Coast Guard Commodore Jay Tarriela, saying that Vietnam does not "engage in harassing our fishermen or illegally deploying coast guard vessels and maritime militia in the waters surrounding our occupied maritime features."

China's grey-zone activity in the region has also prompted response from the US, who has conducted Freedom of Navigation Operations (FONOPS) in the region to maintain a steady presence and deter China's accumulation of gains. China has condemned this and claimed the US cannot conduct military operations in its EEZ, however the US has noted that they have every right to do so under UNCLOS.

Additionally, to defy China's assertions that they have sovereign airspace above their artificial islands, the US flew B-52 bombers over Chinese artificial islands in December 2015.

=== Grey-zone tactics in the East China Sea ===
The East China Sea (ECS) is an area of great international importance, due to its position between China and Japan. Its location makes it an arena for disputes between the second and third largest economies in the world. Every action taken in this area has a significant effect on the security situation in the rest of the region as these two economic behemoths go head-to-head in territorial disputes. In addition to this, the proximity of another economic giant, South Korea, makes the ECS even more important.

A 2006 agreement between Japan and China aimed to turn the area into a "Sea of Peace, Cooperation and Friendship." However, this aim has not been fulfilled, especially in the last few years, where China has intensified its patrols and grey zone activities in the area.

==== Grey-zone Strategies in the ECS ====
The concept of grey-zone strategies has been central to China's approach in the ECS. These tactics involve activities below the threshold of armed conflict, designed to assert control without provoking outright war.

China's grey zone tactics include deploying state and state-supported vessels to harass foreign boats, normalizing its presence in disputed waters, and employing coercive measures to challenge opposing claims. These actions are driven by the strategic calculus that escalating conflicts over uninhabited or strategically insignificant areas is not logical. Analysts note that China's approach is influenced by the balance of power and its broader regional objectives.

From a Taiwanese perspective, China's strategy is described in four phases: initial incursions following specific incidents, normalization of presence, expanded control, and potential full-scale invasion. Other analyses suggest these activities aim to challenge the effective control of disputed territories, such as the Senkaku Islands, by demonstrating persistent Chinese presence and enforcement capabilities.

Chinese Maritime Strategy

China's maritime strategy is informed by principles outlined in the People's Liberation Army's (PLA) "Science of Military Strategy" (SMS). This document describes Non-War Military Operations (NWMOs) as a key method for securing national interests. These operations include confrontational and law-enforcement activities aimed at deterring adversaries and asserting sovereignty in disputed areas.

The 2020 SMS update introduced the concept of "Quasi-War Military Operations" (QWMO), which occupies a space between traditional military operations and NWMOs. These strategies reflect a more assertive interpretation of deterrence, incorporating elements of coercion to achieve strategic objectives.

The Senkaku Islands

The Senkaku Islands, known as Diaoyu in Chinese, are a cluster of uninhabited islets and rocks situated at the edge of the ECS's continental shelf. Located approximately 120 nautical miles southwest of Okinawa, Japan claimed these islands in 1895. No formal Chinese objections were recorded until 1970-71, following reports suggesting the potential for natural resources in the area. The islands were returned to Japan in 1972 after being under U.S. administration since 1945.

The Islands constitute the most significant geopolitical flashpoint and locus of security competition between China and Japan. The Islands are described as the focal point of China's grey zone activities in the ECS.

Disputes over the islands have periodically flared, with both Japan and China asserting conflicting principles for maritime boundary delimitation. Japan advocates for the equidistance approach, while China supports the natural prolongation of the continental shelf.

Chinese vessels have significantly increased their presence around the Senkaku Islands, engaging in activities such as patrolling, enforcing maritime law, and challenging Japanese fishing operations. In response, Japan has reinforced its Coast Guard presence and emphasized the need for coordinated actions between its maritime security and defense forces.

Regional and Global Implications

China's grey-zone activities in the ECS have far-reaching consequences. These actions challenge existing maritime laws and international norms, such as the United Nations Convention on the Law of the Sea (UNCLOS). Japan has accused China of undermining these principles through its operations around the Senkaku Islands.

The increased presence of Chinese vessels in disputed waters has strained Japan's security system, which relies on a clear division of responsibilities between its Coast Guard and military forces. Analysts recommend a more integrated approach to address grey zone scenarios effectively.

China's tactics also test the resilience of regional alliances, particularly the U.S.-Japan partnership. Observers note that while China employs unconventional methods to advance its maritime interests, the United States and its allies often adhere to traditional strategies, creating an imbalance. Enhanced coordination among allies is seen as critical to countering China's grey zone strategies.

The ECS and the Senkaku Islands remain at the center of strategic competition in East Asia. The interplay of historical claims, resource potential, and evolving maritime strategies underscores the complexity of disputes in the region. As China continues to employ grey zone tactics, the ECS exemplifies the challenges of modern maritime governance and regional security dynamics.

=== Russia's grey-zone tactics in the Black Sea ===
The Black Sea Region has been geopolitically pivotal because of its location. There is, along with the Caspian Sea region, the closest area to the conflict-ridden Middle East, the Gulf and the Indian subcontinent, so it is bordering Central Asia, Afghanistan, Syria or Iraq.

This connection provides Europe with more energy resources, natural gas, metals and rare earth, in addition to increased trade and transit for emerging markets in the broader region.

After the collapse of the Soviet Union, in 1993, Russia and Ukraine made a fishery agreement which enable both Russia and Ukraine to fish throughout the Sea of Azov. However, Russia interpreted the agreements as denying Ukrainian delimitation claims and permitting the Russian coastal guard to interfere with fishing near the Ukrainian coast.

=== Grey-zone incidents in Black Sea region ===
Russia's strategy in the Black Sea was two-fold. First, Russia was putting pressure on Ukraine using projection of power leverages. Secondly, understanding its inability to oppose NATO in economic and military dimensions, Russia avoided direct military confrontation with NATO countries in the Black Sea, relying on hybrid tactics.

In the period 2014 to 2022, between the annexation of Crimea and full size of execution of military power, such a strategy was prominently revealed in the comparison of two naval incidents, both concerning an innocent passage through what Russia claimed to be its territorial waters around Crimea: the Kerch Strait incident on 25 November 2018, and the HMS Defender incident on 23 June 2021.

==== Tuzla Islands conflict - 2003 ====
a Russian private firm, without any authorization from the Ukrainian side, began constructing a two-kilometer dam from the Russian coast to the small but strategically important Tuzla Island near the Kerch Strait. The Kerch Strait shipping routes went through Ukrainian territorial waters thanks to this island, Significantly, the formal customers of the construction were private individuals affiliated with Russian paramilitary Cossack organizations. The conflict was resolved by halting construction and signing the Agreement Between the Russian Federation and Ukraine on Cooperation in the Use of the Sea of Azov and the Kerch Strait.

==== Kerch Strait incident -2018 ====
After the annexation of Crimea, the Russian grey-zone activities have been intensified over the time. On 25 November 2018, in the Kerch Strait incident, Russian coast guard vessels rammed and then fired on three Ukrainian warships attempting to transit the Kerch Strait, resulting in injuring six Ukrainian sailors, and further detaining the ships and their crew. While Ukrainian ships had the right of passage under the Ukraine–Russia Azov Sea treaty of 2003 that had still been in force, Russia in that incident was the side directly projecting power.

Some authors suggest that the legal uncertainty derived from the challenged status of Crimean coastal waters and the Kerch Strait Bridge security regulations was utilized to operate in a 'gray zone' to complicate decision-making for other states.

==== Black Sea incident - 2021 ====
On 21 June 2021, Russian patrol ships allegedly fired warning shot to a British warship, the HMS Defender which was siling from Odesa to Georgia within the annexed Crimea's territorial water and a Su-24 M craft dropped four bombs along the vessel's path. British officials characterized this incident as a Russian gunnery exercise. In addition, document confirms that the passage was a calculated decision by the British government and that the use of the warship was in pursuit of coercive diplomatic goals.

==== Connection to Hybrid Warfare ====
There has been also escalating cyberattacks by Russia systematically against Ukraine since at least 2014. It is hybrid warfare beyond active measures employed previously. Cyber is part of this for espionage, destructive warfare, and for information warfare and political destabilization. It affects the physical world by maliciously altering the code of Industrial Control Systems (ICS) and Supervisory Control and Data Acquisition (SCADA) systems. Similarly, telecommunications, banking and transactions, transport as well as public utilities, such as energy and water, can be impacted.

Also, Russia has historically used natural gas supply, Nord Stream 2, and pricing as a geopolitical tool, notably in the gas crises of 2006 and 2009, where supply to Ukraine and Europe was disrupted. However, during the 2013-2014 crisis, Russia employed more nuanced tactics, offering price discounts and debt restructuring rather than outright supply cuts. Various factors, such as the globalization of the gas market, are possible, but it is clear that Russia did not swing to a hardline stance as the 'gas weapon' at the time of the annexation of Crimea.

=== Responses to Russian grey-zone activities in Black Sea regions ===
The Russian annexation of Crimea in 2014, accompanied by the seizure of Ukrainian warships and supplies based there, led to a severe weakening of the Ukrainian navy. The efforts of the Ukrainian government to address these challenges over the next eight years, followed by the annexation, faced two main obstacles. Firstly, there was an acute shortage of financial resources, especially given the ongoing conflict in the Donbas. On top of that, Ukrainian leadership generally considered the confrontation with Russia primarily at the ground domain of war, neglecting the naval component's development. Secondly, throughout this period, Ukraine faced an evident reluctance of Western allies to supply any heavy weapons. A primary explanation was the desire to avoid escalating the conflict between Ukraine and Russia or the fear of being involved in this conflict.

They tried to the recovery of surface forces up to 2030 by deploying boats of the 'mosquito fleet' supported by coastal artillery, but this project was abandoned due to technical difficulties. There were just scaled up river patrol boats poorly suited for naval task. They shifted the plan towards the navy's enhancing and adding strike capabilities due to plans to commission British projected and built missile boats and Turkish Ada-Class corvettes. However, NATO's fear of escalation to war has not strengthened the Ukrainian Navy to the point where it can adequately compete with the Russian Navy.

Russia's 2014 aggression against Ukraine caused a significant shift in NATO's perception of its strategic environment. In 2014, at the Wales Summit, Russia reappeared as a "challenge" on the alliance's eastern edge "with strategic implications". Signifying a return to a more military-centric approach, the Alliance established a Very High Readiness Joint Task Force (VJTF),"a new Allied joint force that will be able to deploy within a few days to respond to challenges that arise, particularly at the periphery of NATO's territory and deployable anywhere along NATO's periphery at short notice". The allies also agreed to reverse the decline in the allies' defense spending.

And also NATO's Comprehensive Approach to deterrence that emerged from the 2011 Lisbon Summit Declaration is a step toward countering unconventional threats, but empirical evidence from the Baltics shows that it has yet to be sufficiently effective in remedying the key areas that enable the use of diaspora-related gray zone tactics.

Russia has been conducting gray zone operations as a broader backdrop against the NATO and Western sides, whereas the Western countries seem to have written effective measures out of fear of war escalation with Russia. Since Ukraine is not a member of NATO in the first place, the aid itself creates a large gap with the current situation.

== See also ==
- Gunboat diplomacy
- Proxy war
- Chinese salami slicing strategy
- Unrestricted Warfare
- Russian invasion of Ukraine
- Annexation of Crimea by the Russian Federation
