= Grey zone =

Gray zone, grayzone, grey zone, or greyzone may refer to:

== Arts, entertainment, and media ==
- The Grey Zone (1997 film), an Italian film directed by Franco Bernini
- The Grey Zone, a 2001 American film directed by Tim Blake Nelson
- Greyzone, a 2018 Swedish-Danish drama series
- The Grayzone, a news website founded by Max Blumenthal
- Gray Zone Warfare, a 2024 immersive tactical first-person shooter by Madfinger Games

== Other uses ==
- Grey-zone (international relations), the space between war and peace
- Grey Zone Agreement between Norway and the Soviet Union
- Gray Zone in Aegean Sea
- Gray zone lymphoma, a type of cancer
- Primo Levi's grey zone, a moral concept about the Holocaust

== See also ==
- Grey area (disambiguation)
