= Shades of gray (disambiguation) =

Shades of gray or shades of grey refers to variations of the color gray.

Shades of gray, Shades of grey or variations may also refer to:

== Film and television ==
- Shades of Gray (PMF 5047), a 1948 documentary produced as part of the U.S. Army's Professional Medical Film series
- "Shades of Gray" (Heroes), the nineteenth episode of the third season
- "Shades of Gray" (Star Trek: The Next Generation), the twenty-second episode of the second season
- "Shades of Gray", the tenth episode of the first season of Danny Phantom
- "Shades of Gray", episode 110 of the seventh season of Homicide: Life on the Street
- "Shades of Grey", the fourth episode of the second season of The Joy of Painting
- "Shades of Grey", the eighteenth episode of the third season of Stargate SG-1
- "Shades of Gray", the sixth episode of the first season of Voltron: The Third Dimension

== Literature ==
- Shades of Gray, a superhero novel by Jackie Kessler and Caitlin Kittredge
- Shades of Gray (Reeder novel), 1989 children's historical novel by Carolyn Reeder
- Shades of Gray Comics and Stories, a comic book written and drawn by Jimmy Gownley
- Shades of Grey: Glasgow, 1956–1986, a collection of photographs by Oscar Marzaroli including an essay by William McIlvanney
- Shades of Grey, a 2009 novel by Jasper Fforde

== Music ==
=== Albums ===
- Shades of Grey (Al Grey album), 1965
- Shades of Gray (The Choir album), 1986
- Shades of Grey, by Autumn's Grey Solace, 2006
- Shades of Grey, by Braille, 2004

=== Songs ===
- "Shades of Gray" (song), by the Monkees, 1967
- "Shades of Grey" (Delilah song), 2012
- "Shades of Gray", by Amanda Marshall from Tuesday's Child, 1999
- "Shades of Gray", by Amorphis from Circle, 2013
- "Shades of Grey", by Billy Joel from River of Dreams, 1993
- "Shades of Gray", by Black Label Society from Catacombs of the Black Vatican, 2014
- "Shades of Grey", by Drake Bell, 2010 (unreleased)
- "Shades of Grey", by Mercenary from Metamorphosis, 2011
- “Shades of Grey”, by Oliver Heldens and Shaun Frank, 2015
- "Shades of Grey", by Overkill from I Hear Black, 1993
- "Shades of Gray", by Robert Earl Keen from Picnic, 1997
- "Shades of Grey", by Sam Sparro from Return to Paradise, 2012
- "Shades of Grey", by Symphony X from Symphony X, 1994

== See also ==
- 14 Shades of Grey, the 4th studio album by US rock band Staind
- Fifty Shades of Grey (disambiguation)
- Grayscale
- Grey area (disambiguation)
- Splitting (psychology)
