= Adam Henry (artist) =

American artist

Adam Henry (born in Pueblo, Colorado, 1974) is an American artist. He lives and works in Brooklyn, New York.

== Exhibitions ==
=== Solo exhibitions ===
- 2015 : Repetition (Repetition), Meessen De Clercq, Brussels (Belgium)
- 2014 : Alien Beatnik Siren, Joe Sheftel Gallery, New York (USA)
- 2013 : An aspen's inability to be a pine, Meessen De Clercq, Brussels (Belgium)
- 2012 : In Spectral Form, Joe Sheftel Gallery, New York (USA)

=== Selected group exhibitions ===
==== 2016 ====
- Absolute Beginners, Lucien Terras, New York (USA)
- Future Developments, David Petersen Gallery, Minneapolis (USA)
- Bewegung Auge Kopf Hand, Villa Merkel – Bahnwärterhaus, Esslingen am Neckar (Germany)
- Spirit Your Mind, curated by Marie Maertens and Anissa Touati. DAD Video program, Apple TV
- Vitreous Humour, Kansas, New York (USA)

==== 2015 ====
- A.N.T.H.R.O.P.O.C.E.N.E, Meessen De Clercq, Brussels (Belgium)
- LOOM, Lucien Terras, New York (USA)
- Painting the Sky Blue, Stefan Lundgren Gallery, Palma de Mallorca (Spain)
- Crunchy, organized by Gregory Linn and Clayton Press, Marianne Boesky Gallery, New York (USA)
- Post Analog Painting, The Hole, New York (USA)
- The Two States of W.W., curated by Andrew Prayzner, TSA New York, Brooklyn (USA)

==== 2014 ====
- Homo Ludens, Meessen De Clercq, Brussels (Belgium)
- This One's Optimistic: Pincushion, New Britain Museum of American Art, New Britain (USA)
- Parallax Futured: Transtemporal Subjectivities, Skirball Museum, Cincinnati (USA)
- Post-Psychedelic Dreams, Grey Area / Glenn Horowitz Bookseller, East Hampton (USA)
- Go With the Flow, The Hole, New York (USA)

==== 2013 ====
- Page 179, Artforum, September 2013, Brennan & Griffin, New York (USA)
- Xtraction, The Hole, New York (USA)
- Art Los Angeles Contemporary solo presentation, Joe Sheftel Gallery, New York (USA)
- The Medium's Session, Zeitgeist, Nashville (USA)

==== 2012 ====
- Workspace Program Exhibition 2012, Dieu Donné, New York (USA)
- Specifically Yours, Joe Sheftel Gallery, New York (USA)
- Retrospect, Charles Bank Gallery, New York (USA)

==== 2011 ====
- The Third Order, Charles Bank Gallery, New York (USA)
- Anonymous Presence, Y Gallery, New York (USA)
- Painted Pictures, Blackston Gallery, New York (USA)
- Neon Sigh, Twistcooparcadia, Nashville (USA)
- In the Heavens of our Imagination…, Lost Coast Culture Machine, Fort Bragg (USA)

==== 2010 ====
- Gradation, Portugal Arte 10-Portuguese Biennial, Lisbon (Portugal)

==== 2009 ====
- On From Here, Guild and Greyshkul, New York (USA)
- NADA County Affair, curated by Johannes Vanderbeek, Brooklyn (USA)
- Room Tones, St Cecilia's Convent, Brooklyn (USA)
- Fortress to Solitude, 1 Grattan, curated by Guillermo Cruies, Brooklyn (USA)

==== 2008 ====
- Blank, curated by Yi Zhou, Median Museum, Beijing (China)
- Plastic Topography, South Street Seaport Museum, New York (USA)
- The Map, curated by Vandana Jian, ROCA, Nyack (USA)

==== 2007 ====
- Blank, Ke Center for Contemporary Art, Shanghai (China)
- Aqua Exhibition, Acuna-Hansen, Los Angeles (USA)

==== 2006 ====
- Passport -International Globus Dislocater, Roebling Hall, Brooklyn (USA)
- Invitational, Roski Gallery, University of Southern California, Los Angeles (USA)

==== 2005 ====
- Working Space, Cuchifritos Project Space, New York (USA)
- All of a Piece, Geoffrey Young Gallery, Great Barrington (USA)

==== 2004 ====
- A Slow Read, Rotunda Gallery, Brooklyn (USA)
- Irrational Exuberance, Stephan Stux Gallery, New York (USA)

==== 2003 ====
- Fresh Meat, Center for Experimental and Perceptual Art, Buffalo (USA)
- Metastisize, BRAC, Bronx (USA)
- Toward a Low End Theory, Minnesota Center for Photography, Minneapolis (USA)
- Labor Day, Rare Gallery, New York (USA)

==== 2002 ====
- The Accelerated Grimace, Silverstein Gallery, New York (USA)
- Aim 22, Bronx Museum of the Arts, Bronx (USA)
- Love and Ardor, Geoffrey Young Gallery, Great Barrington (USA)

==== 2000 ====
- Location, Midway Contemporary Art, Minneapolis (USA)
- Waiting List, Geoffrey Young Gallery, Great Barrington (USA)

==== 1999 ====
- To Detail, Geoffrey Young Gallery, Great Barrington (USA)
- MFA Thesis Exhibition, Yale Art Gallery, New Haven (USA)

==== 1998 ====
- Norfolk Art Division, Norfolk (USA)
- New Talent at Yale, Yale Art Gallery, New Haven (USA)
- Luggage Show, The Luggage Store Gallery, San Francisco (USA)
- Shrink, Southern Exposure Gallery, San Francisco (USA)
