= Adam Henry =

Adam Henry may refer to:

- Adam Henry (American football) (born 1972), American football coach and player
- Adam Henry (rugby league) (born 1991), New Zealand rugby league footballer
- Adam Henry (artist) (born 1974), American artist
