= Fifty Shades of Grey (disambiguation) =

Fifty Shades of Grey is a 2011 erotic romance novel by British author E. L. James.

Fifty Shades of Grey may also refer to:

- Fifty Shades of Grey (film series), an American film trilogy series
  - Fifty Shades of Grey (film), the first film in the series, 2015
    - Fifty Shades of Grey (soundtrack), the soundtrack for the 2015 film

== See also ==
- 14 Shades of Grey, the 4th studio album by US rock band Staind
- "Fifty Shades of Grayson", an episode of the American series The Vampire Diaries
- Shades of gray (disambiguation)
