= Budapest Memorandum =

1994 CSCE conference agreements

Budapest Memorandum on Security Assurances
Memorandum on Security Assurances in connection with the Republic of Belarus'/Republic of Kazakhstan's/Ukraine's accession to the Treaty on the Non-Proliferation of Nuclear Weapons
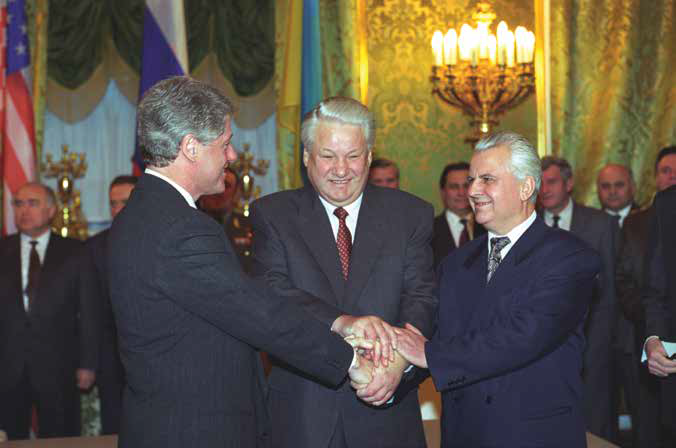
- U.S. President Clinton, Russian President Yeltsin, and Ukrainian President Kravchuk after signing the Trilateral Statement in Moscow on 14 January 1994
- Signed: 5 December 1994
- Location: Budapest, Hungary
- Parties: Belarus; Kazakhstan; Ukraine; Russia; United States; United Kingdom
- Languages: English; Russian; Ukrainian (Ukraine Memorandum); Belarusian (Belarus Memorandum); Kazakh (Kazakhstan Memorandum)

Full text at Wikisource
- Ukraine Memorandum on Security Assurances; Memorandum on Security Assurances in connection with the Republic of Kazakhstan’s accession to the Treaty on the Non-Proliferation of Nuclear Weapons; Memorandum on Security Assurances in connection with the Republic of Belarus' accession to the Treaty on the Non-Proliferation of Nuclear Weapons

The Budapest Memorandum on Security Assurances comprises four substantially identical political agreements signed at the Conference on Security and Co-operation in Europe (CSCE) in Budapest, Hungary, on 5 December 1994, to provide security assurances by its signatories relating to the accession of Belarus, Kazakhstan, and Ukraine to the Treaty on the Non-Proliferation of Nuclear Weapons (NPT). The four memoranda were originally signed by four nuclear powers: Ukraine, Russia, the United States, and the United Kingdom. France and China gave individual assurances in separate documents.

The memoranda, signed in Patria Hall at the Budapest Congress Center with US Ambassador Donald M. Blinken amongst others in attendance, prohibited Russia, the United States, and the United Kingdom from threatening or using military force or economic coercion against Ukraine, Belarus, and Kazakhstan, "except in self-defence or otherwise in accordance with the Charter of the United Nations". As a result of the memorandum and other agreements, between 1993 and 1996, Belarus, Kazakhstan, and Ukraine gave up their nuclear weapons. On 6 December the CSCE without mentioning the Budapest Memoranda per se published in the same conference hall the Budapest Summit Declaration and the Budapest Decisions, following which on 1 January 1995 it became known as the OSCE.

Russia violated the Budapest memorandum in 2014 with its annexation of Ukraine's Crimea and in 2022 by invading Ukraine. As a response, the United States, United Kingdom, and France provided Ukraine with financial and military assistance, and imposed economic sanctions on Russia, while ruling out "any direct interventions to avoid a direct confrontation with Russia".

== Content ==
According to the three memoranda, Russia, the US, and the UK confirmed their recognition of Belarus, Kazakhstan, and Ukraine becoming parties to the Treaty on the Non-Proliferation of Nuclear Weapons and effectively removing all Soviet nuclear weapons from their soil, and that they agreed to the following:

1. Respect the signatory's independence and sovereignty in the existing borders (in accordance with the principles of the CSCE Final Act).
2. Refrain from the threat or use of force against the territorial integrity or political independence of the signatories to the memorandum, and undertake that none of their weapons will ever be used against these countries, except in cases of self-defense or otherwise in accordance with the Charter of the United Nations.
3. Refrain from economic coercion designed to subordinate to their own interest the exercise by Ukraine, the Republic of Belarus, and Kazakhstan of the rights inherent in its sovereignty and thus to secure advantages of any kind.
4. Seek immediate Security Council action to provide assistance to the signatory if they "should become a victim of an act of aggression or an object of a threat of aggression in which nuclear weapons are used".
5. Not to use nuclear weapons against any non-nuclear-weapon state party to the Treaty on the Non-Proliferation of Nuclear Weapons, except in the case of an attack on themselves, their territories or dependent territories, their armed forces, or their allies, by such a state in association or alliance with a nuclear weapon state.
6. Consult with one another if questions arise regarding those commitments.

== History ==
Partly as a way to gain international recognition, the Ukrainian government made commitments early on that Ukraine would be a non-nuclear-weapon state. The Declaration of State Sovereignty of Ukraine on 16 July 1990 committed Ukraine "not to accept, produce, or acquire nuclear weapons", although this was opposed by some Ukrainian politicians, who saw Russia as a threat. Until Ukraine transferred the Soviet nuclear weapons stationed on its soil, it held the world's third-largest nuclear weapons stockpile. Belarus only had mobile missile launchers, and Kazakhstan had chosen to quickly give up its nuclear warheads and missiles to Russia. Ukraine went through a period of internal debate on their approach.

=== Preliminaries ===
On 23 May 1992, Russia, the US, Belarus, Kazakhstan, and Ukraine signed the Lisbon Protocol to the START I treaty, ahead of ratifying the treaty later. The protocol committed Belarus, Kazakhstan and Ukraine to adhere to the NPT as non-nuclear weapons states as soon as possible. However, the terms for the transfer of the nuclear warheads were not agreed, and some Ukrainian officials and parliamentarians started to discuss the possibility of retaining some of the modern Ukrainian built RT-23 (SS-24) missiles and Soviet built warheads.

In 1993, two regiments of UR-100N (SS-19) missiles in Ukraine were withdrawn to storage because warhead components were past their operational life, and Ukraine's political leadership realised that Ukraine could not become a credible nuclear military force, as they could not maintain the warheads and ensure long-term nuclear safety. Later in 1993, the Ukrainian and Russian governments signed a series of bilateral agreements giving up Ukrainian claims to the nuclear weapons and the Black Sea Fleet, in return for $2.5 billion of gas and oil debt cancellation and future supplies of fuel for its nuclear power reactors. Ukraine agreed to ratify the START I and NPT treaties promptly. This caused severe public criticism, leading to the resignation of Ukrainian Defence Minister Morozov. On 18 November 1993, the Rada passed a motion agreeing to START I but renouncing the Lisbon Protocol, suggesting that Ukraine would only decommission 36% of missile launchers and 42% of the warheads on its territory, and demanded financial compensation for the tactical nuclear weapons removed in 1992. This caused US diplomatic consternation, and the following day Ukrainian President Kravchuk said: "we must get rid of [these nuclear weapons]. This is my viewpoint from which I have not and will not deviate." He then brought a new proposal to the Rada.

Yeltsin and Clinton news conference, 14 January 1994

On 15 December 1993, US Vice President Al Gore visited Moscow for a meeting. Following side discussions, a US and Russian delegation, including US Deputy Secretary of Defense William J. Perry, flew to Ukraine to agree to the outlines of a trilateral agreement including US assistance in dismantling the nuclear systems in Ukraine and compensation for the uranium in nuclear warheads. Participants were invited to Washington on 3–4 January to finalise the agreement. A Trilateral Statement with a detailed annex was agreed, based on the previously agreed terms but with detailed financial arrangements and a firm commitment to an early start to the transfer of at least 200 warheads to Russia and the production in Russia of nuclear reactor fuel for Ukraine. Warheads would be removed from all RT-23s (SS-24) within 10 months. However, Ukraine did not want a commitment to transfer all warheads by 1 June 1996 to be made public for domestic political reasons, and Russia did not want the financial compensation for uranium made public because they were concerned that Belarus and Kazakhstan would also demand this. It was decided to exclude these two matters from the published agreement, but cover them in private letters between the countries' presidents.

Another key point was that US State Department lawyers made a distinction between "security guarantee" and "security assurance", referring to the security guarantees that were desired by Ukraine in exchange for non-proliferation. "Security guarantee" would have implied the use of military force in assisting its non-nuclear parties attacked by an aggressor (such as Article 42.7 of the Mutual Defence Clause of the European Defence Union for European Union members), while "security assurance" would simply specify the non-violation of these parties' territorial integrity. In the end, a statement was read into the negotiation record that the (according to the US lawyers) lesser sense of the English word "assurance" would be the sole implied translation for all appearances of both terms in all three language versions of the statement. In the Ukrainian and Russian version of the document, the wording "security guarantees" was used though.

President Clinton made a courtesy stop at Kyiv on his way to Moscow for the Trilateral Statement signing, only to discover that Ukraine was having second thoughts about signing. Clinton told Kravchuk that not signing would risk major damage to US–Ukraine relations. After some minor rewording, the Trilateral Statement was signed by the three presidents in Moscow in front of the media on 14 January 1994.

=== The Budapest Memoranda ===
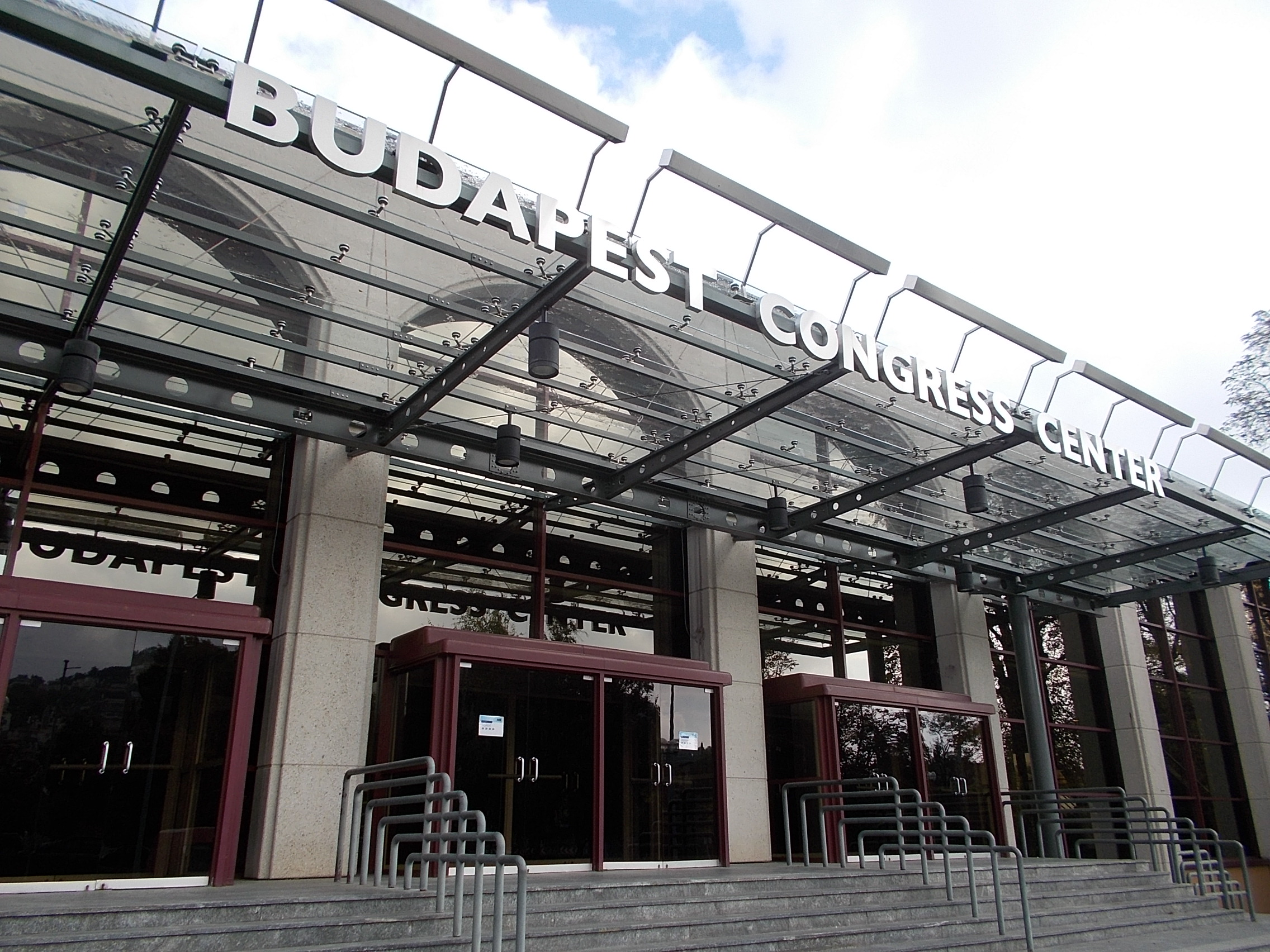
On 5 December 1994 the leaders of the seven nations gathered at the Budapest Congress Center, shown here in a photograph dated October 2015, to sign the three documents.

The "Budapest Memorandum" is actually three documents signed individually on 5 December 1994 by the three leaders of the ex-Soviet nations, together with the guarantor nations: United States, United Kingdom, and Russia. So, the UNTERM portal notes for one:

To distinguish this from the other two Budapest Memorandums of the same date, this one could be referred to as the Budapest Memorandum regarding Kazakhstan.

=== Sequels ===
After this was agreed, the US used its Nunn–Lugar Cooperative Threat Reduction programme to provide financial assistance over $300 million (equivalent to $652 million in 2025), and technical assistance in decommissioning the nuclear weapons and delivery systems, which took to 2008 to fully complete. The US also doubled other economic aid to Ukraine to $310 million (equivalent to $673 million in 2025) for 1994.

During the Tuzla Island conflict in 2003, Ukraine decided not to invoke the Budapest Memorandum.

In 2009, Russia and the United States released a joint statement that the memorandum's security assurances would still be respected after the expiration of the START Treaty.

==== 2013 Belarus sanctions ====
In 2013, the government of Belarus complained that American sanctions against it were in breach of Article 3 of the Memorandum. The US government responded that its sanctions were targeted at combating human rights violations and other illicit activities of the government of Belarus and not the population of Belarus, and also noted that the Memorandum is "not legally binding".

==== 2014 Russian annexation of Crimea ====
In February 2014, Russian forces seized or blockaded various airports and other strategic sites throughout Crimea. The troops were attached to the Russian Black Sea Fleet stationed in Crimea, which placed Russia in violation of the Budapest Memorandum. The Russian Foreign Ministry had initially denied the movement of armoured units attached to the Black Sea Fleet in Crimea, which led to the troops being labelled "little green men", however after taking full military control over Crimea, Russia finally did admit their involvement but asserted that they were acting within the scope of the various agreements between the two countries. Russia responded by illegally staging a so-called "referendum" on whether the Crimea should join it, where the option to remain part of Ukraine and keep the same rights and laws of 2014, as before, was not present. Prior to the referendum, Russian military blocked all the opposition TV and media, as well as radically put down the rallies for support of Ukraine. As a result, the Crimean parliament announced a referendum on Crimea's future in accordance with the law "On the Autonomous Republic of Crimea". On 16 March, the referendum was held. On 17 March, Crimea declared independence. On 21 March, it was incorporated into the Russian Federation.

Ukraine vigorously protested the action as a violation of Article 1 of the Budapest Memorandum. Russia breached Budapest memorandum in 2014 with its annexation of Ukraine's Crimea. As a response, the US and the UK provided Ukraine with financial and military assistance and imposed economic sanctions on Russia, while ruling out "any direct interventions to avoid a direct confrontation with Russia". After the annexation, Canada, France, Germany, Italy, Japan, the UK, and the US stated that Russian involvement was a breach of its Budapest Memorandum obligations to Ukraine and in violation of Ukrainian sovereignty and territorial integrity. On 1 March, the Address of the Verkhovna Rada of Ukraine to the Guarantor States in accordance with the Budapest Memorandum of 1994 on Security Assurances in connection with Ukraine's accession to the Treaty on the Non-Proliferation of Nuclear Weapons was published.

On 4 March, Russian president Vladimir Putin replied to a question on the violation of the Budapest Memorandum, describing the current Ukrainian situation as a revolution: "a new state arises, but with this state and in respect to this state, we have not signed any obligatory documents". Russia stated that it had never been under obligation to "force any part of Ukraine's civilian population to stay in Ukraine against its will". Russia suggested that the US was in violation of the Budapest Memorandum and described the Euromaidan as a US-instigated coup.

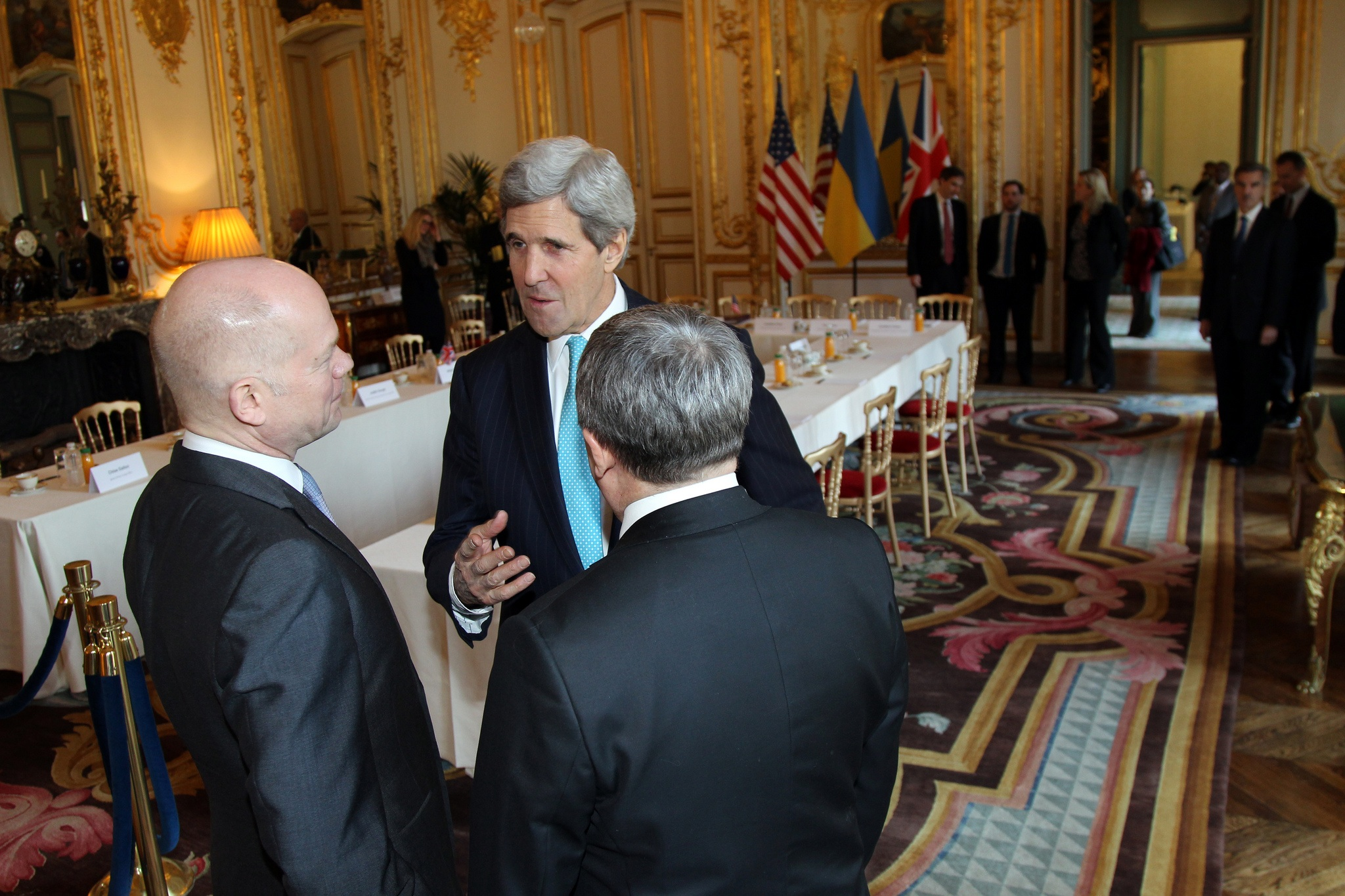
US Secretary of State John Kerry speaks with British Foreign Secretary William Hague and Ukrainian Foreign Minister Andrii Deshchytsia after hosting the Budapest Memorandum Ministerial on the Ukraine crisis in Paris, France, on 5 March 2014.

On 24 March, Canadian Prime Minister Stephen Harper led the G7 partners in an ad hoc meeting during the 2014 Nuclear Security Summit for a partial suspension of Russian membership from the G8 due to Russia's breach of the Budapest Memorandum. He said that Ukraine had given up its nuclear weapons "on the basis of an explicit Russian assurance of its territorial integrity. By breaching that assurance, President Putin has provided a rationale for those elsewhere who needed little more than that already furnished by pride or grievance to arm themselves to the teeth." Harper also indicated support for Ukraine by saying that he would work with the new Ukrainian government towards a free trade agreement.

In February 2016, Sergey Lavrov claimed: "Russia never violated Budapest memorandum. It contained only one obligation, not to attack Ukraine with nukes." However, Canadian journalist Michael Colborne pointed out that "there are actually six obligations in the Budapest Memorandum, and the first of them is 'to respect the independence and sovereignty and the existing borders of Ukraine'". Colborne also pointed out that a broadcast of Lavrov's claim on the Twitter account of Russia's embassy in the United Kingdom actually "provided a link to the text of the Budapest Memorandum itself with all six obligations, including the ones Russia has clearly violated – right there for everyone to see". Steven Pifer, an American diplomat who was involved in drafting the Budapest Memorandum, later commented on "the mendacity of Russian diplomacy and its contempt for international opinion when the foreign minister says something that can be proven wrong with less than 30 seconds of Google fact-checking?"

On 20 April 2016, Ukraine established the Ministry of Reintegration of Temporarily Occupied Territories to manage the occupied parts of the Donetsk, Luhansk, and Crimea regions, which are affected by Russian military intervention of 2014.

==== Kerch Strait incident ====
On 25 November 2018, the Russian Federal Security Service (FSB) coast guard fired upon and captured three Ukrainian Navy vessels after they attempted to transit from the Black Sea into the Sea of Azov through the Kerch Strait on their way to the port of Mariupol. On 27 November 2018, the Ministry of Foreign Affairs of Ukraine appealed to the signatory states of the Budapest Memorandum to hold urgent consultations to ensure full compliance with the memorandum's commitments and the immediate cessation of Russian aggression against Ukraine.

==== 2022 Russian invasion of Ukraine ====
In 2008 and 2011, Putin expressed the opinion that neither the transfer of Crimea to Ukraine nor the Budapest Memorandum signed by Yeltsin were binding for Russia. In 2014, Putin claimed that the Maidan movement and government change radically changed Ukraine into a new entity, toward which Russia has no engagement, allowing the 2014 invasion of Donbas.

Ukrainian President Volodymyr Zelenskyy has publicly commented on the Budapest Memorandum by arguing that it provides no true guarantee of safety due to Russia's coercive power. On 19 February 2022, at the Munich Security Conference, Zelenskyy said: "Since 2014, Ukraine has tried three times to convene consultations with the guarantor states of the Budapest Memorandum [i.e. United States and United Kingdom]. Three times without success. Today Ukraine will do it for the fourth time. … If they do not happen again or their results do not guarantee security for our country, Ukraine will have every right to believe that the Budapest Memorandum is not working and all the package decisions of 1994 are in doubt." Putin used Zelenskyy's comments as part of his claims that Ukraine could develop nuclear weapons. Critics have disputed Putin's claims. The treaty has since been violated by Russia with its 2022 invasion of Ukraine. In March 2022, Aldo Zammit Borda argued in The Conversation: "Russia's invasion of Ukraine today is an even more serious violation and effectively buries Russia's assurances in the Budapest Memorandum."

== Analysis ==
The Budapest Memorandum is not a treaty, and it does not confer any new legal obligations for signatory states. It was written in a way to avoid an impression of legal obligation. Under the agreement the Russian Federation provided security assurances to Ukraine in the form of promising neither to attack nor to threaten to attack them. The other signatories (the United States and the United Kingdom) pledged non-military support to Ukraine in exchange for its adherence to the Treaty on the Non-Proliferation of Nuclear Weapons. The memorandum bundled together a set of assurances that Ukraine had already held from the Conference on Security and Co-operation in Europe (CSCE) Final Act, the United Nations Charter and the Non-Proliferation Treaty, but the Ukrainian government found it valuable to have these assurances in a Ukraine-specific document.

The Budapest Memorandum was negotiated at the political level, but it is not entirely clear whether the instrument is devoid entirely of legal provisions. It refers to assurances, but unlike guarantees, it does not impose a legal obligation of military assistance on its parties. According to Stephen MacFarlane, a professor of international relations, "It gives signatories justification if they take action, but it does not force anyone to act in Ukraine." In the US, neither the George H. W. Bush administration nor the Clinton administration was prepared to give a military commitment to Ukraine, and they did not believe that the US Senate would ratify an international treaty, and so the memorandum was adopted in more limited terms. The memorandum has a requirement of consultation among the parties "in the event a situation arises that raises a question concerning the … commitments" set out in the memorandum. Whether or not the memorandum sets out legal obligations, the difficulties that Ukraine has encountered since early 2014 may cast doubt on the credibility of future security assurances that are offered in exchange for nonproliferation commitments. Regardless, the United States publicly maintains that "the Memorandum is not legally binding", calling it a "political commitment".

Ukrainian international law scholars such as Olexander Zadorozhny maintain that the Memorandum is an international treaty because it satisfies the criteria for one, as fixed by the 1969 Vienna Convention on the Law of Treaties (VCLT) and is "an international agreement concluded between States in written form and governed by international law".

China and France gave security assurances for Ukraine in separate documents. China's governmental statement of 4 December 1994 did not call for mandatory consultations if questions arose but only for "fair consultations". France's declaration of 5 December 1994 did not mention consultations.

For 20 years, until the 2014 Russian military occupation of regions of Ukraine, the Ukrainian nuclear disarmament was an exemplary case of nuclear non-proliferation. Since the invasions of Ukraine by Russia, the wisdom of Ukraine relinquishing its nuclear weapons has been questioned. Even former president Bill Clinton, one of its signatories, questioned this action.

Former US Ambassador to Ukraine Steven Pifer wrote in 2024 that Ukraine choosing to keep the nuclear weapons that were on its territory in the early 1990s was an unrealistic option, given that all of the infrastructure needed to maintain the operational life of the warheads was located in Russia and that Ukraine itself was facing an economic crisis that prevented it from building such infrastructure in its own country. Pifer also noted that the Ukrainian government concluded at the time that doing so would have been unaffordable. He added that in retrospect, American and Ukrainian officials did not foresee the Russo-Ukrainian war, and because of that, Ukraine was willing to accept security "assurances" from the US and Britain, which, unlike "guarantees," do not require the use of military force if the agreement is violated. Pifer also wrote that in his view it would have been unlikely that such guarantees would have been ratified by the US Senate.

Well before the Memoranda were signed, John Mearsheimer wrote in Foreign Affairs that "Ukraine cannot defend itself against a nuclear-armed Russia with conventional weapons, and no state, including the United States, is going to extend to it a meaningful security guarantee. Ukrainian nuclear weapons are the only reliable deterrent to Russian aggression. If the US aim is to enhance stability in Europe, the case against a nuclear-armed Ukraine is unpersuasive… Overall, the best formula for maintaining stability in post-Cold War Europe is for all the great powers—including Germany and Ukraine—to have secure nuclear deterrents and for all the minor powers to be nonnuclear."

== See also ==
- Minsk agreements
- Munich Agreement
- Normandy Format
- Nuclear umbrella
- On the Historical Unity of Russians and Ukrainians 2021 essay by Vladimir Putin
- Russian–Ukrainian Friendship Treaty
- Russo-Ukrainian war
- Ukraine and weapons of mass destruction
