= Oscar Marzaroli =

Italian-born Scottish photographer

Oscar Marzaroli (1933 – August 26, 1988) was an Italian-born British photographer of post-World War II urban Scotland. He was born in Castiglione Vara in northwest Italy and came to Scotland with his family at the age of two.

Marzaroli had a career in photojournalism in London and Stockholm. He also operated as a photographer on the streets of Glasgow and became famed for his iconic images of the city in the 1960s. He was best known for his images of the Gorbals area as the bulldozers cleared away the streets of the run down tenements. Marzaroli's work came to national attention in the 1980s with the publication of three collections of his photographs by the Edinburgh publishing house Mainstream. He was also a film cameraman, as well as director and producer, for Ogam Films, which he founded with three friends in 1967. In the 1960s and 70s, he worked on documentary films for the Films of Scotland Committee and the Highlands and Islands Development Board.

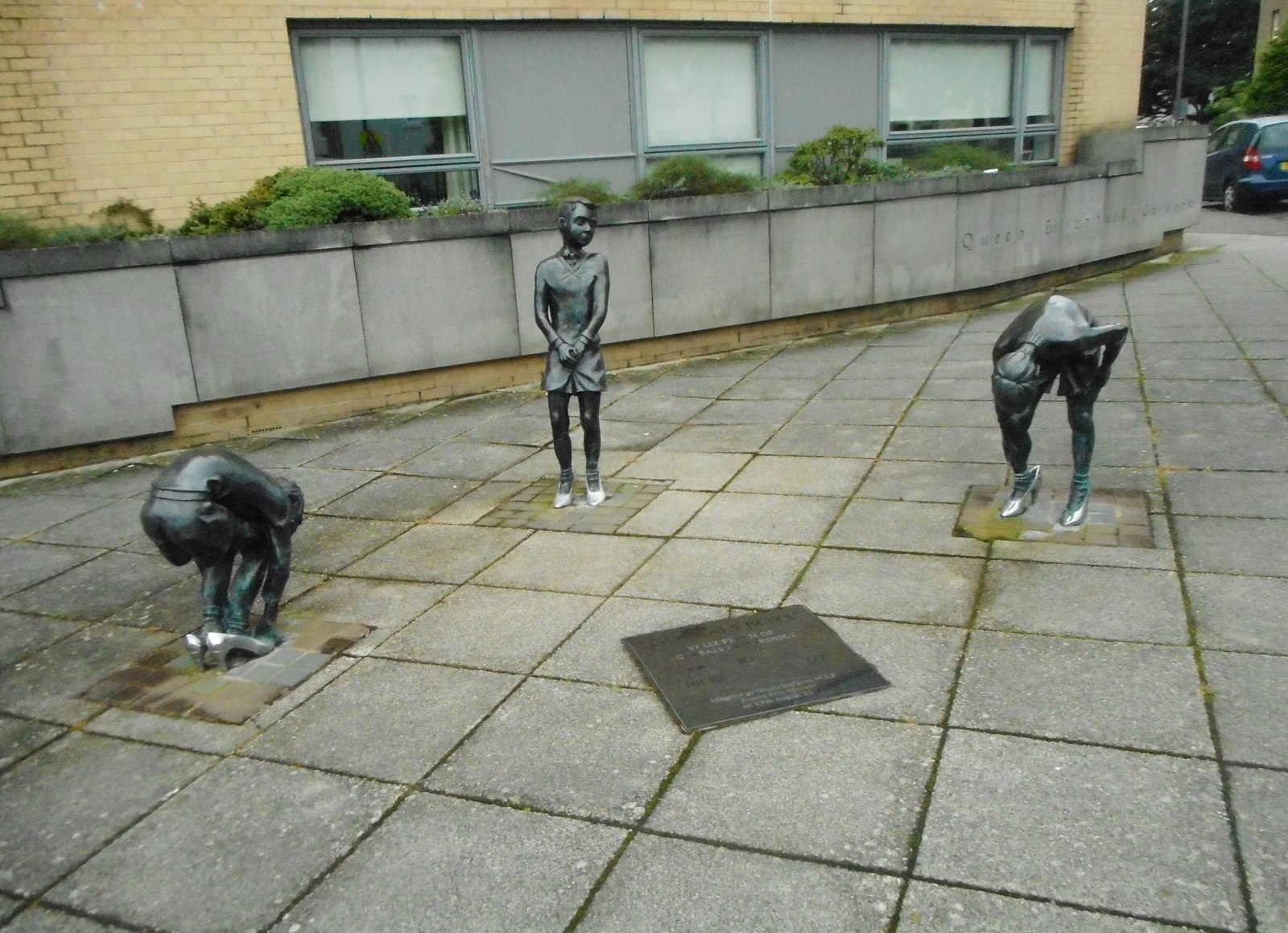
Gorbals Boys sculpture in Glasgow, based on a Marzaroli photograph

In 1991, a number of Glaswegian musicians came together to help compile a tribute album entitled The Tree and the Bird and the Fish and the Bell (the title is inspired by the coat of arms of the city of Glasgow). The rock band Deacon Blue, who contributed to the album, had already extensively used Marzaroli's photographs on their album and single covers. In the same year Marzaroli was also the subject of an ITV documentary.

A website of his prints has since been set up by his family.

The Gorky's Zygotic Mynci song Reverend Oscar Marzaroli is a tribute of sorts.

One of his photographs from 1963, depicting young boys playing dress-up with high-heeled shoes in the streets of the Gorbals, was recreated as a sculpture in 2008 as part of the second regeneration of the district (the tenements he captured in images were replaced by tower blocks in projects such as Hutchesontown C, which themselves were demolished by the end of the century).

== Books ==
- Shades of Grey – Glasgow 1956-1987, 1987 ISBN 1-85158-047-6
- Shades of Scotland 1956-1988, 1989 ISBN 1-85158-213-4
- Glasgow's People 1956-1988, 1993 ISBN 1-85158-592-3
- One Afternoon in Lisbon by Kevin McCarra and Pat Woods (Photographs by Oscar Marzaroli).
