= Andrey Shipitsin =

Russian military sailor

- Андрей Олегович Шипицин
- Born: Andrey Olegovich Shipitsin; 25 December 1969 (age 56); Astrakhan, Soviet Union
- Military career
- Allegiance: Russia
- Branch: Russian Navy
- Conflicts: Kerch Strait incident

Andrey Olegovich Shipitsin (Russian: Андрей Олегович Шипицин; born on 25 December 1969) is a Russian naval officer, who is a sailor, and the captain of the III rank of the Coast Guard of the border troops of the FSB of Russia, commander of the PSKR "Emerald".

== Biography ==
Andrei shipitsin was born on 25 December 1969 in Astrakhan.

He had commanded the patrol ship "Emerald" project 22460.

=== Kerch Strait incident ===
On 25 November 2018, the ship "Emerald" was involved in an incident near the Kerch Strait. Shipitsin gave the order to attack with naval weapons the warships of Ukraine, which were going to the ports of the Sea of Azov.

As a result of the attack by Coast Guard, Navy and military aircraft, in which Shipitsin was directly involved, martial law was imposed in Ukraine, in 10 regions of the country.

After the attack, Shipitsin was added to the Peacemaker database. The Security Service of Ukraine and the Military Prosecutor's Office of Ukraine charged him under several articles of the Criminal Code of Ukraine: Art. 437 (planning, preparation, resolution and conduct of aggressive war), Art. 15 (attempted crime), Art. 115 (premeditated murder), Art. 28, art. 27.

=== Sanctions ===
He was sanctioned by the UK government in 2019 in relation to the Russo-Ukrainian War.
