= Kherson Border Detachment =

79th Kherson Border Detachment
- 79 прикордонний загін (Ukrainian)
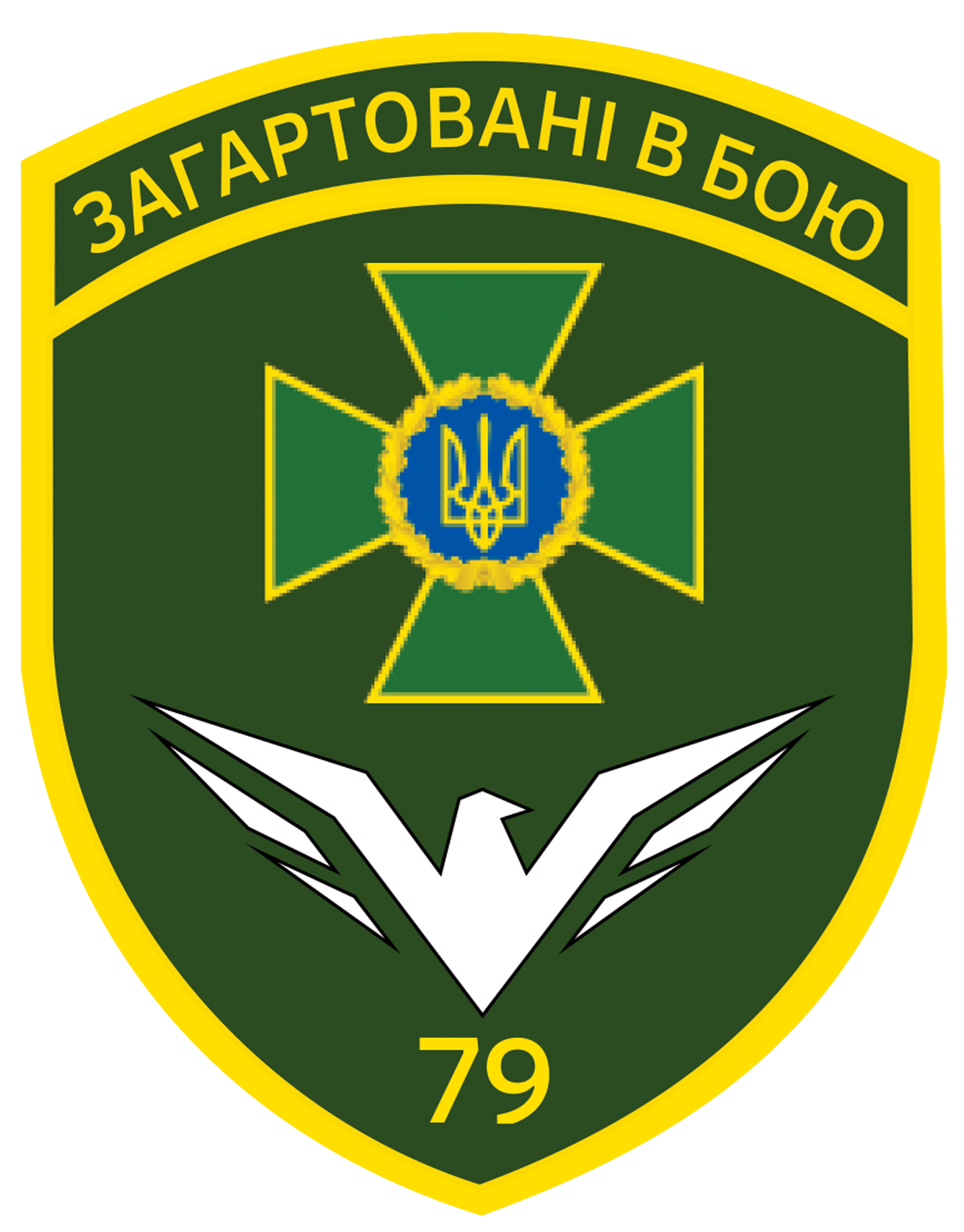
- Detachment insignia
- Founded: 1992
- Country: Ukraine
- Allegiance: Ministry of Internal Affairs
- Branch: State Border Guard Service
- Type: Brigade
- Role: Border guard
- Garrison/HQ: Kherson, Ukraine
- Engagements: Russo-Ukrainian war; 2003 Tuzla Island conflict; Russian invasion of Crimea; Russian invasion of Ukraine; Southern Ukraine campaign; Battle of Kherson (2022); 2022 Kherson counteroffensive; Dnieper campaign
- Decorations: For Courage and Bravery

Commanders
- Current commander: Colonel Vladyslav Kobylyakov

The Kherson Border Detachment (MUN 2161) is a brigade level detachment of the Eastern Department of the State Border Service of Ukraine. The detachment guards the Black Sea and the de facto "Russia-Ukraine border" in four Raions (Skadovsk Raion,Henichesk Raion, Kherson Raion and Kakhovka Raion) of Kherson Oblast and one Raion (Mykolaiv Raion) of Mykolaiv Oblast. The detachment guards border length of 506.8 km, 306.8 km on land, 180 km on river and 20 km on lake.

== History ==
=== Service in the Soviet Union ===
The detachment was established on 30 June 1938, on the basis of two command posts of the Odesa Maritime Border Detachment as the 79th Border Detachment of NKVD of the Ukrainian SSR was created to protect the western border along the Dniester River, with the headquarter being Mayaki. In 1940, following the Annexation of Bessarabia it was deployed for the protection of border from Dzurashulesti to the Black Sea. In the summer of 1941, it became the 79th separate border rifle regiment and saw combat during WW2 during the battles or Kirovohrad, Dnipropetrovsk, Pyatikhatky, Kharkiv, Pavlograd and the infamous Battle of Stalingrad. The regiment received its battle flag following the battle of Izium where the regiment's fighters broke through the German encirclement. In 1944, following the Crimean offensive, the 79th border detachment was transferred there becoming the 79th Simferopol Detachment. It became a member of the South-Western District KGB, then the KGB Operational Group under the Council of Ministers of the Ukrainian SSR from 1960 and Western Border District of the KGB from 1963. In 1968, the Simferopol border detachment was awarded the Order of the Red Banner.

=== Service in Ukraine ===
In 1992, following the Dissolution of the Soviet Union, it came under the jurisdiction of Ukraine.

On 29 September 2003, Russia began construction of a dam in the Kerch Strait from the Taman Peninsula to Tuzla Island. In the following, 2003 Tuzla Island conflict the 25th Outpost of the Simferopol Border Detachment was deployed to the island. Ultimately, construction of the dam was stopped on 23 October 2003.

On 2 March 2014, during the Russian invasion of Crimea, Spetsnaz and the Federal Security Service of Russia attempted to storm the headquarters of the Simferopol detachment but failed to capture the building. On 7 March 2014, the Russian military almost completely besieged the detachment completely and the detachment was forced to evacuate its personnel along with weapons and military equipment and was relocated to Kherson.

The detachment detained two Russian FSB who illegally crossed the border in Kherson Oblast on 30 June 2017. The detachment detained a person trying to cross into Crimea in August 2020. On 14 July 2017, the detachment barred 4 Russian citizens from entering Ukraine. In 2018, following acid leaks in Crimea, 59 people from Crimea fled to Ukraine via the posts of the Detachment.

Following the Russian invasion of Ukraine, the detachment saw combat against Russian forces. On 24 February 2022, on the day of the start of invasion, a guardsman of the Detachment (Iozhytsia Anatoly Ivanovich) was killed in action in Antonivka during the Battle of Kherson. On the same day, three guardsmen of the detachment were taken captive during a Russian assault on Chonhar and were later returned on 25 August 2024. To preserve manpower, the detachment along with the other units temporarily retreated from Kherson Oblast. It then took part in the 2022 Kherson counteroffensive. The detachment returned to Kherson in November 2022. On 30 April 2023, the Detachment was awarded the honorary award "For Courage and Bravery". On 22 June 2023, a guardsman of the detachment (Danylo Andriyovych Nechvolod) was killed during a combat mission in the Kherson Oblast during the Dnieper campaign. In February 2024, the detachment's FPV units began operations across the Dnieper. On 24 February 2024, the detachment's UAVs and artillery destroyed Russian troops and equipment across the Dnieper killing two Russians and wounding one.

== Structure ==
The detachment includes:

- Management and Headquarters
- Border Service Department "Ochakiv"
- Border Service Department "Mykolaiv"
- Border Service Department "Kherson"
- Border Service Department "Zalizniy Port"
- Border Service Department "Skadovsk"
- Border Service Department "Preobrazhenka"
- Border Service Department "Blagovishchenka"
- Border Service Department "Chonhar"
- Type C Department
- Operational-combat Command Post "Sivash"
- Guardian Units

It operates 21 checkpoints, 16 by sea, 2 by air and 3 by road.

== Commanders ==
- Major General Kharlanov P. P. (1992–1995)
- Colonel Rumyantsev V. IN. (1995–1997)
- Colonel Gurskyi M. M. (1997–1998)
- Colonel Mushimanskyi V. D. (1998–2003)
- Colonel Alekseenko P. D. (2003–2004)
- Colonel A. V. Posmetyuk (2004–2006)
- Colonel Zamelyuk M. P. (2006–2012)
- Colonel Sadovchuk A. AT (2013–2014)
- Colonel Fedorchuk Anatoly Viktorovych (2015)
- Colonel Oleg Shevchenko (2016)
- Colonel Pavlo Petrovych Lysak (2017)
- Colonel Yuriy Mykhailovych Chernov (2017–2021)
- Colonel Konstantin Barbashov (2021–2022)
- Colonel Vladyslav Kobylyakov (2022-)

== Sources ==
- Херсонський прикордонний загін на сайті Державної прикордонної служби України
