= Treaty Between the Russian Federation and Ukraine on Cooperation in the Use of the Sea of Azov and the Kerch Strait =

- Signed: December 24, 2003; 21 years ago
- Effective: 23 April 2004
- Signatories: Russia; Ukraine
- Languages: Russian, Ukrainian

The Treaty Between the Russian Federation and Ukraine on Cooperation in the Use of the Sea of Azov and the Kerch Strait is an agreement on sea and fisheries between Russia and Ukraine entered into force on 23 April 2004. It was signed on 24 December 2003 by President of Ukraine Leonid Kuchma and President of Russia Vladimir Putin and ratified by both parliaments in April 2004.

In February 2023 the Ukrainian parliament Verkhovna Rada formally denounced all treaties with Russia on cooperation in the Sea of Azov and in June 2023 Russia’s upper house of parliament, the Federation Council, approved a bill denouncing the Russian-Ukrainian treaty. It argued that "because, now, the coasts of the Sea of Azov and the Kerch Strait come under the sole jurisdiction of the Russian Federation Ukraine has lost its status as a littoral state with respect to these bodies of water."

== Abstract ==
The Parties, proceeding from the necessity of conservation of the Azov–Kerch defined area of water as integral economic and natural complex, to be used in the interests of the Russian Federation and Ukraine, have agreed as follows:

1. The Sea of Azov and the Kerch Strait are historically internal waters of the Russian Federation and Ukraine.
2. The Sea of Azov must be delimited by the state border in accordance with the Agreement signed by the Parties.
3. Dispute settlement regarding the issues pertaining to the defined area of water of Kerch must be regulated by agreement between the Parties.
4. Mercantile vessels and other state non-commercial vessels flying the flags of the Russian Federation and Ukraine have free navigation in the Sea of Azov and the Kerch Strait.
5. Russian–Ukrainian cooperation in the spheres of navigation, fisheries, protection of marine environment, ecological safety and life-saving in the Sea of Azov and the Kerch Strait must be implemented on the basis of existing international agreements and by conclusion, in respective cases, of the new ones.

== Commentary ==
Russia and Ukraine have been in a dispute over the delimitation of the waters of the Kerch Strait since the Collapse of Soviet Union. The treaty was signed after 2003 Tuzla Island conflict under pressure of Russian seizure of Tuzla Island and the Kerch Strait's navigable channel from Ukraine. According to Jamestown Foundation, the terms of the treaty were disadvantageous to Ukraine.

In the context of the 2018 Kerch Strait incident, Sergey Lavrov at a press-conference in Rome said that while the agreement stipulates the free navigation, since the Sea of Azov is the common internal waters, both sides have the right for inspection, which was exercised in the past without any complaints. However, Ukraine already filed arbitral proceedings against Russian Federation on the Law of the Sea including the restrictions on passage of Ukrainian vessels through Kerch Strait and the Sea of Azov as far as 2016. Furthermore, the fact is that 24 sailors and 3 ships remain in the custody of Russia in violation of the agreement.
