= Johannes Vanderbeek =

American contemporary artist (born 1982)

Johannes Vanderbeek (born 1982 in Baltimore, Maryland) is an American contemporary artist currently living and working in New York City. Vanderbeek is represented by the New York gallery Marinaro and had a solo show that opened in February 2017. He has had three solo shows at Zach Feuer Gallery.

VanDerBeek has been included in museum shows at White Flag in St. Louis, Missouri and the Tang Museum at Skidmore College.
