= Russian–Ukrainian Friendship Treaty =

1997 agreement between Ukraine and Russia

Treaty on Friendship, Cooperation, and Partnership between Ukraine and the Russian Federation
- Signed: 31 May 1997
- Location: Kiev, Ukraine
- Effective: 1 April 2000
- Expiration: 31 March 2019
- Signatories: Ukraine; Russia
- Languages: Ukrainian and Russian

The Treaty on Friendship, Cooperation, and Partnership between Ukraine and the Russian Federation, also known as the "Big Treaty", was an agreement signed in 1997 between Ukraine and Russia, which fixed the principle of strategic partnership, the recognition of the inviolability of existing borders, and respect for territorial integrity and mutual commitment not to use its territory to harm the security of each other. The treaty prevents Ukraine and Russia from invading one another's country respectively, and declaring war. Due to the beginning of the Russo-Ukrainian War in 2014, Ukrainian president Petro Poroshenko signed a decree not to extend the treaty on 19 September 2018. The treaty consequently expired on 31 March 2019.

Until 2019, the treaty was automatically renewed on each 10th anniversary of its signing, unless one party advised the other of its intention to end the treaty six months prior to the date of the renewal.

Russia–Ukraine relations have deteriorated since the start of the Russo-Ukrainian War with the 2014 Russian annexation of Crimea and Russian support for separatist forces in the war in Ukraine's Donbas region. They were completely severed following the Russian invasion of Ukraine.

== Signing and ratification ==
The treaty was signed in Kyiv on 31 May 1997 by the president of Ukraine Leonid Kuchma and Russian president Boris Yeltsin.

In Ukraine, the treaty was ratified by the Law of Ukraine No. 13/98-VR on 14 January 1998 (On ratification of the Treaty of Friendship, Cooperation and Partnership between Ukraine and the Russian Federation).

In Russia, on 25 December 1998, the State Duma of the Federal Assembly adopted a resolution on the adoption of the federal law "On ratification of the Agreement of Friendship, Collaboration and Partnership between the Russian Federation and Ukraine" and directed it to the Federation Council. The Federation Council approved this federal law by the Resolution on 17 February 1999. The treaty was ratified.

The document superseded the previous treaty between the Russian Soviet Federative Socialist Republic and the Ukrainian Soviet Socialist Republic of 19 November 1990 (before dissolution of the Soviet Union).

== Contents of the treaty ==
Under the agreement both parties ensure the citizens of the other countries' rights and freedoms on the same basis and to the same extent that it provides for its citizens, except as prescribed by national legislation of States or international treaties.

Every country protects in established order of the rights of its citizens living in another country, in accordance with commitments to documents of the Organization for Security and Co-operation in Europe and other universally recognized principles and norms of international law, agreements within the Commonwealth of Independent States.

The agreement, among other things prematurely confirms the inviolability of borders of countries, regardless of the fact that Russia and Ukraine had not finalized a border between the two countries. The border was delineated in the 2003 Treaty on the Russian-Ukrainian State Border, but Ukraine has started the agreed-upon demarcation unilaterally after Russia dragged its feet.

Under Article 2:

In accord with provisions of the UN Charter and the obligations of the Final Act on Security and Cooperation in Europe, the High Contracting Parties shall respect each other′s territorial integrity and reaffirm the inviolability of the borders existing between them.

The Treaty document stipulates in Article 40 that the Treaty is entered into for a period of 10 years and renews automatically unless one of the parties notifies the other of its intention to curtail the Treaty.

== Termination ==
On 19 September 2018, Ukrainian president Petro Poroshenko signed a decree not to extend the treaty. On 3 December 2018, Poroshenko drafted a legislation to Parliament to end the Treaty of Friendship immediately; support came from Western allies within the United Nations Security Council. According to Poroshenko the non-renewal "does not require a vote" in the Ukrainian parliament. Ukraine announced that on 21 September 2018, it would notify the United Nations and other relevant organizations on the termination of the treaty. Russia's Ministry of Foreign Affairs said that it was notified on 24 September 2018 of the treaty's termination by Ukraine and expressed regret.

On 3 December 2018, Poroshenko submitted a bill on the termination of the treaty to parliament; 277 MPs supported the termination of the treaty, and 20 legislators voted against it. On 6 December the Ukrainian parliament declared the Treaty to be terminated starting from 1 April 2019.

== See also ==
- Partition Treaty on the Status and Conditions of the Black Sea Fleet
- Budapest Memorandum on Security Assurances
