= The Grey Area (film) =

- Directed by: Noga Ashkenazi
- Produced by: Noga Ashkenazi
- Edited by: Amelia Peterson
- Music by: Eric Santiestevan
- Distributed by: Women Make Movies
- Release date: 2012
- Running time: 65 minutes
- Country: United States
- Language: English

The Grey Area is a feature-length documentary film by Noga Ashkenazi about the lives of inmates at the Iowa Correctional Institution for Women in Mitchellville, Iowa. The film documents an eight-week feminism class taught by student volunteers from Grinnell College. The Grey Area explores women's issues in the criminal justice system, including gender, sexuality, class and race. A small group of female inmates share their experiences with motherhood, drug addiction, sexual abuse and domestic violence.

== Production ==
Ashkenazi began work on the documentary in 2009 as a 4th year student in Grinnell College, where she volunteered at the prison and documented the feminism class she taught there. She then moved to Los Angeles, where she hired her crew and completed the film in 2012. Ashkenazi commented to The Fix that "During my experience working with the female inmate population, I learned that the vast majority of incarcerated women were victims before they became offenders," and that her film "explores the impact of having a history of domestic violence and sexual abuse on these women's lives, and how directly that history of abuse has led them to coming to prison."

== Film festivals and awards ==
The award-winning documentary premiered at the 2012 ArcLight Cinemas Documentary Film Festival in Los Angeles, California and went on to screen at the Julien Dubuque International Film Festival 2013 where it won the Best Documentary award. The film screened at the Sarasota Film Festival and at the Through Women's Eyes International Film Festival in 2013, and had additional screenings across the Midwest. The Grey Area is distributed in North America by Women Make Movies. Press coverage for the film includes a positive review in Filmmaker (magazine), a DVD recommendation from the renowned Ms. (magazine), and articles in The Des Moines Register, The Fix Magazine and the Altoona Herald-Mitchellville Index.
