= Shades of Grey: Glasgow, 1956–1986 =

Book of photographs by Oscar Marzaroli

Shades of Grey: Glasgow 1956-86
- First edition
- Author: Oscar Marzaroli, William McIlvanney
- Publisher: Mainstream Publishing
- Publication date: 31 December 1987
- Pages: 223
- ISBN: 9781851580477

Shades of Grey: Glasgow, 1956-86 is a book of photographs by Oscar Marzaroli with an essay by William McIlvanney.

One of the photos from the book, a 1963 portrait of three young boys wearing their mother's high-heeled shoes playing in Kidson Street in the Gorbals area of Glasgow, was in 2005 made into a bronze statue installed in Queen Elizabeth Square.

February 2020

The Marzaroli family created the Gorbals community group that made saving Oscars unseen collection possible through Caledonian University.

The statue was unveiled in August 2008 by Nicola Sturgeon, then Scotland's Deputy First Minister.
