= 2003 Tuzla Island conflict =

Territorial dispute between Russia and Ukraine

- Part of post-Soviet conflicts
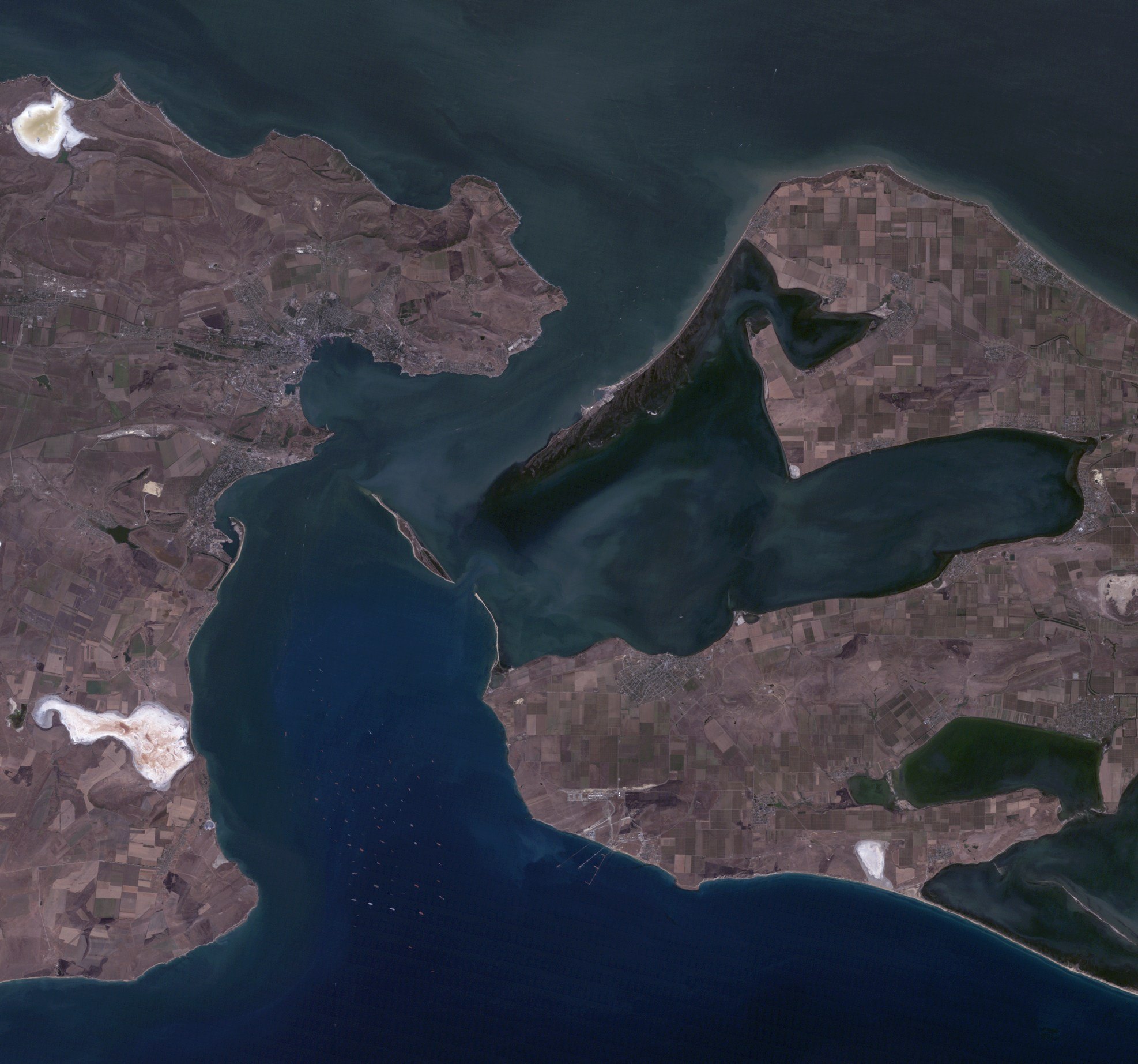
- Kerch Strait in 2011, with the long, thin causeway stretching from the Russian coast towards the island
Date	September–October 2003
Location	Tuzla Island, Kerch Strait
Result	See the § Aftermath

Belligerents
Russia; Federal Security Service; FSB Border Service	Ukraine; Ministry of Internal Affairs; State Border Guard Service

Commanders and leaders
Vladimir Putin; Mikhail Kasyanov	Leonid Kuchma; Viktor Yanukovych

A dispute over Tuzla Island in the Kerch Strait arose between Russia and Ukraine in 2003, sparked by unannounced Russian construction of a causeway from their side of the strait toward the island, which is Ukrainian territory. Russians offered various reasons for building the causeway, but Ukraine saw it as a threat to their territorial integrity. The dispute raised fears of an armed confrontation, but a settlement was negotiated.

== Background ==
Tuzla Island is a sandy island off the coast of the Crimean Peninsula. Formerly a spit connected by land to the Kuban region of Russia, it was disconnected from it by a heavy storm in 1925. In 1941, the island was transferred to the Crimean Autonomous Socialist Soviet Republic, which was part of the Russian Soviet Federative Socialist Republic. It became the Crimean Oblast in 1945, and the oblast was transferred to the Ukrainian Soviet Socialist Republic in 1954. Tuzla Island came under the control of the briefly independent Republic of Crimea before joining with Ukraine when the Crimean parliament joined Ukraine in 1995.

Russia recognized Ukrainian sovereignty over Crimea in the Russian–Ukrainian Friendship Treaty of 1997, but the status of Tuzla Island was not settled and remained a sore spot in Russia–Ukraine relations. The governor of Krasnodar Krai, Alexksandr Tkachyov, said in 2003, "... I think that this is land that was bathed in Cossack blood, and therefore it is our sacred land," claiming the island as part of Russia. Tkachyov later met with the deputy speaker of the Russian duma, Vladimir Zhirinovsky, who then claimed that the majority of the Duma backed the Russian claim over Tuzla Island. Controlling the island would give either country much control over the shipping to the Sea of Azov and for that reason it was seen as a priority for the Ukrainian government. In 2003, the island was home to a dozen families of Ukrainian fishermen, and two vacation resorts.

== Events ==
On 9 September 2003, Russians began construction of a causeway from the Taman Peninsula in Krasnodar Krai towards Tuzla Island. The work began rapidly, without notice, with up to 180 dump truck loads of earth an hour being dropped into the sea.

There were several stories regarding what entity in Russia authorised the construction. One had it that a local self-government body of the Kuban Cossacks authorised construction to reduce saltwater flow to Taman Bay, to thus improve conditions for certain species of fish. According to this story, many Kuban Cossack activists were among the construction workers. Kyiv newspaper Zerkalo Nedeli suggested that it was supported by local Crimean and Russian businessmen and Ukrainian Communist politician Leonid Hrach to convince Ukraine and Russia to build a bridge over Kerch Strait to facilitate trade. Officials in Krasnodar Krai said they were just rebuilding the pre-1925 land connection, to protect their coastal area from flooding. The central government in Moscow likewise said it was to prevent erosion of the coast.

Romanian-American political analyst Vladimir Socor claimed that the construction was by Russia's Ministry of Emergency Situations. He said that Russian president Vladimir Putin personally ordered and oversaw the construction, with the purpose of connecting Russia to Tuzla Island, making it part of the Russian mainland. He said that Russia was attempting to seize control of the strait's main shipping channel from Ukraine.

The Ukrainian government responded by deploying border troops of the Simferopol Detachment on the island. Prime Minister Viktor Yanukovych said, "Tuzla is an integral part of Ukrainian territory." Deputy Prime minister Mykola Azarov later said that the Ukrainian government would spend "whatever amount necessary" to defend its national interest following the allocation of 5.5 million hryvnia to increase border security on Tuzla.

On 21 October 2003, the Russian tugboat Truzhenik crossed the border to photograph and film border posts and defences on the island and was detained by the Border Service of Ukraine. The Ukrainians released the tugboat after armed Russian coastal guard boats arrived.

On 23 October 2003, the Verkhovna Rada issued a resolution "to eliminate a threat to the territorial integrity of Ukraine that appeared as a result of dam construction by the Russian Federation in the strait of Kerch". A provisional special parliamentary commission was created to investigate the case more thoroughly.

On 30–31 October 2003, talks started between Ukraine and Russia in order to deflate the crisis. President Kuchma ended the confrontation through an undeclared compromise, accepting terms disadvantageous to Ukraine, in return for Russian authorities halting construction of the causeway and accepting the continuation of Ukrainian sovereignty over the strait's navigable channel.

== Aftermath ==
The incident damaged Leonid Kuchma's reputation domestically, as he was accused of attempting to control Ukrainian media reporting on the event.

Disputes about right of passage were resolved by a 2003 bilateral agreement on cooperation in the use of the Sea of Azov and the Kerch Strait, which made these water bodies shared internal waters of both countries.

The island came under full Russian control following the 2014 Russian annexation of Crimea, and they built the Kerch Strait Bridge partly on it.

== See also ==
- 1986 Black Sea incident
- 1988 Black Sea bumping incident
- 2018 Kerch Strait incident
- 2021 Black Sea incident
- Black Sea Fleet dispute
