= Grey Area (gallery) =

Coordinates: 48°50′52.01″N 2°22′32.81″E

Grey Area is a Paris-based editions and multiples project specialising in commissioning and producing original contemporary art.

Founded in 2006, Grey Area works directly with artists, inviting them to come up with ideas especially suitable for development and production as a limited edition multiple, resulting in an exhibition at the gallery space in Paris, France.

== Artists ==
Grey Area works with artists to create artist multiples that draw on ideas and themes in their work. Artists that Grey Area produces artworks with include Guy Allott, Matt Calderwood, Nick Laessing, Sophie Glover, Richard Galpin, Samuel Levack & Jennifer Lewandowski, Simon Ripoll-Hurier, and Katie Goodwin.

== Exhibitions ==
Grey Area have exhibited work at a number of spaces and art fairs across Europe, in addition to their gallery in Paris. These include Multiple Art Days (MAD) Paris, The London Art Fair, and Multiplied Art Fair London, a London-based art fair dedicated exclusively to contemporary art in editions organised by Christie's.
