= Port Kavkaz railway station =

Railway station in Russia

Port Kavkaz Порт Кавказ
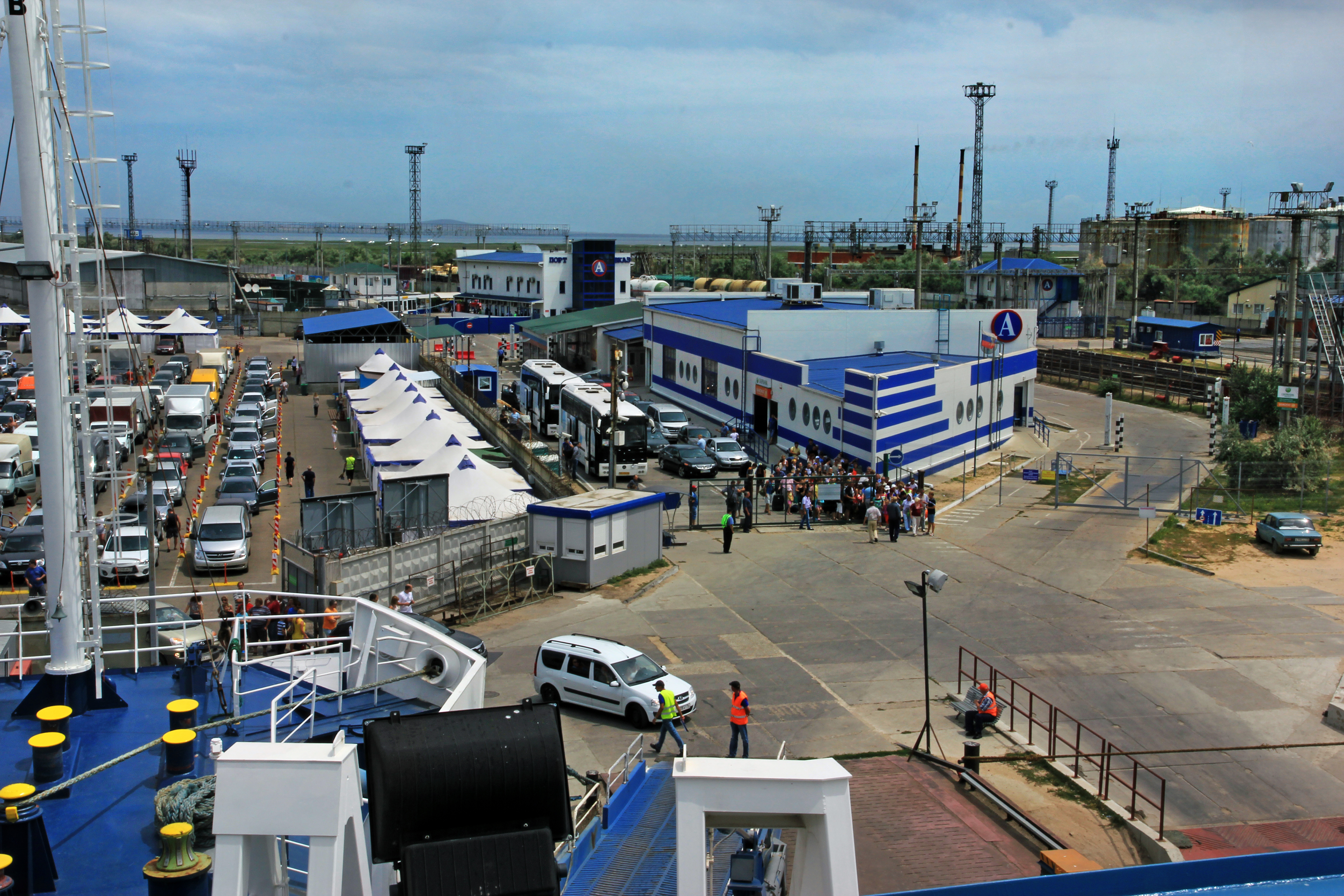
- Kavkaz station is seen on the right

General information
- Location: Chushka, Temryuksky District, Port Kavkaz; Krasnodar Krai; Russia
- Coordinates: 45°20′27″N 36°40′29″E
- Owner: Russian Railways
- Operator: North Caucasus Railway
- Platforms: 2
- Tracks: 2

Construction
- Structure type: At-grade
- Parking: Yes
- Cycle facilities: Yes

Other information
- Fare zone: 6

History
- Opened: 1944

Services
Preceding station	Russian Railways	Following station
Terminus	Port Kavkaz–Timashevsk	Fontalovskaya towards Timashevsk
Former services
Preceding station	Ukrainian Railways	Following station
Port Krym Terminus	Kerch Strait ferry line	Terminus
Location

Port Kavkaz (Russian: Порт Кавказ) is a railway station at the Port Kavkaz seaport on the Chushka Spit in Krasnodar Krai, Russia.

== History ==
The station was opened in 1944 to serve the new Kerch railway bridge. It was part of a project that included construction of tracks to the bridge – from Sennaya station to Port Kavkaz, and from Kerch to Port Krym. The bridge was destroyed by ice in February 1945.

The Kerch ferry crossing from Port Kavkaz opened in 1954.

In 1989 the railway ferries stopped carrying passenger trains. The station continued to operate, serving freight trains and a Kavkaz–Krasnodar diesel passenger train. In 1995 the railway ferries were stopped and the station became disused.

In 2004 new rail ferries arrived at Port Kavkaz and resumed the movement of freight trains on the Kerch Strait ferry line. In 2007, the station became primary when sending oil cars from Russia to Armenia, replacing Ukrainian Illichivsk. In 2008 new railway lines were built to the station. Since 2009, the station sends cars to Bulgaria, bypassing customs procedures on the borders of Ukraine, Moldova and Romania.

On 22 August 2024, in the context of the Russian invasion of Ukraine, a ferry carrying fuel was on fire at the port, allegedly following a Ukrainian operation.
