= Kerch railway bridge =

1944 Soviet railway bridge

Kerch railway bridge Керченский железнодорожный мост
- Coordinates: 45°19′42″N 36°38′15″E
- Carried: Sennaya – Fontalovskaya – Chushka Spit – Kerch railway line
- Crossed: Kerch Strait
- Locale: Russian SFSR, Soviet Union
- Official name: Kerch railway bridge
- Other name: Kerch Bridge
- Owner: Soviet government

Characteristics
- Design: Truss swing bridge
- Total length: 4.5 km (2.8 mi)
- Longest span: 55 m (180.45 ft)

History
- Constructed by: People's Commissariat of Railways of the Soviet Union
- Construction start: 1944
- Opened: November 3, 1944
- Collapsed: February 1945
- Replaced by: Kerch Strait ferry line (1954–2020); Crimean Bridge (since 2019/20) (Note: As a strict replacement (for the rail link). In terms of overland transportation in general (i.e. including road transport, which was not supported by the 1944-45 bridge), then the replacement could be said to be effective since 2018.)

Location
- Interactive map of Kerch railway bridge

The Kerch railway bridge (Russian: Керченский железнодорожный мост), also called the Kerch Bridge (Russian: Керченский мост), was a short-lived Soviet Russian railway bridge across the Kerch Strait, which connects the Black Sea with the Sea of Azov. Constructed in 1944–1945 and demolished later in 1945, it connected the Chushka Spit of the Krasnodar Krai with the Kerch Peninsula of the Crimean ASSR. With a length of 4.5 km (2.8 mi), it was the longest bridge in the Soviet Union.

The Soviets began construction of the bridge in spring 1944 shortly after the liberation of Crimea by the Red Army. They used materials remaining from an unbuilt bridge of the occupying German forces. Although it was opened for transport in autumn that year, construction was still incomplete, and December 1944 storms halted construction. By that time only part of the protective starkwaters were completed, and in February 1945 ice severely damaged the bridge, destroying the bridge pillars. Repair proposals were rejected and remnants of the bridge were disassembled afterwards.

== History ==
=== Early proposals for a bridge ===
Construction of a bridge across Kerch Strait was considered as early as 1903. It was to be a part of a railway between Crimea and the Taman Peninsula. Two routes were considered: a northern one from Yenikale to Chushka Spit, and a southern one crossing via the Tuzla Spit. The northern variant allowed for use of existing railway infrastructure and so was cheaper, but the railroad would be longer and would run through the northern part of the Taman Peninsula, bypassing the most economically developed parts. So the southern route was preferred, and in 1910 Tsar Nicholas II sanctioned geotechnical investigations on this route. World War I and the Russian Revolution prevented construction from commencing. Not until World War II and the German invasion of the Soviet Union was the idea of a fixed link across the Kerch Strait taken up again.

=== German efforts, 1942–1943 ===
Following the outbreak of German–Soviet hostilities in 1941, construction of a fixed link across the strait gained new importance, to ensure stable supply for the military units of both combatants. A ropeway construction by the German Organisation Todt (OT) started in 1942 and was completed in June 1943. With a daily capacity of 1,000 tons, the ropeway just sufficed to meet the defensive needs of the German 17th Army.

On 7 March 1943 Hitler ordered construction of a combined road and railway bridge over the strait within six months, to push for the German invasion of the North Caucasus. Construction began in April 1943. The Soviet Union closely monitored the state of transport infrastructure in German-occupied Crimea. From June 1943, when Soviet intelligence learned that Nazi Germany was constructing a bridge, information about it was allocated a special section in intelligence reports. In September 1943, before the bridge was completed, concentrated Soviet attacks began on the Kuban bridgehead, accelerating the German retreat. When retreating the Wehrmacht blew up the already completed parts of the bridge and destroyed the ropeway.

=== Soviet construction of the bridge, 1944 ===
Soviet forces restored the ropeway and used it extensively to further the Kerch–Eltigen Operation. The Soviets also wanted to use a bridge: in January 1944, even before the liberation of Kerch by the Red Army (which would take place on 11 April, during the Crimean offensive), the State Defense Committee ordered the construction of a 4.5-kilometre (2.8 mi) railway bridge across the strait, to be finished by 15 July 1944. By the time Kerch was liberated, the engineering design was underway and general construction had begun on the eastern adjacent roads and on the causeway on the Caucasus shore. 470 anti-air platforms, 294 anti-air guns, 132 searchlights, 96 fighters and two radars were used to detect and defend from aerial attacks on the construction site.

The bridge started at Chushka Spit as a stone causeway about 1 km (0.62 mi)-long, crossed the strait and ended at a low-level shore of the Yenikale Peninsula, between Zhukovka and Opasnoye. The bridge used piles up to 30 m (98 ft) long, the bridge was 4.5 km (2.8 mi) long and about 3 m (9.8 ft) wide, it had 111 27.3 m (90 ft)-long ordinary spans, two movable 27 m (89 ft)-long spans and two movable 55 m (180 ft)-long spans. The movable spans were of a swing bridge design, rotating horizontally over two adjacent navigable shipping lanes in the strait.

While the bridge was being built, connected railways were constructed towards it from Sennaya on the Caucasus shore, and from the Kerch metallurgic factory on the Crimean shore. Railway links between Port Kavkaz and Sennaya and Port Krym and Kerch railway stations were also under construction: the first was to be a 46 km (29 mi)-long railway, the second one would be 18 km (11 mi)-long.

To hasten opening of the bridge the construction works were divided into two stages, but the government-demanded deadline was impossible to accomplish. Construction took seven months, and the first train crossed the bridge on 3 November 1944. By that time only structures dedicated for the first stage were created, while to ensure protection of the bridge from storms and ice flows there was still much work to do. Severely worsened weather conditions in December 1944, and more frequent winter storms, prevented completion of construction, and also began to inflict damage on the fixed link itself. In particular, one violent storm propelled a barge towards the eastern causeway and destroyed it.

=== 1945 ice damage and demolition ===
In February 1945 drift ice, propelled by a northeastern wind from the Sea of Azov towards the incomplete bridge, inflicted fatal damage, with only five protective starkwaters ready by that time. On 18–19 February 1945, ice destroyed 24 pillars, and 26 of the 110 spans fell into the strait; by 20 February 1945, 42 pillars and 48 spans were destroyed. By March 1945, 46 pillars and 53 spans were destroyed, and 1016 pillars out of 2357 were severely damaged. Attempts to weaken the ice by artillery and ground-based ice blasting were ineffective, and aerial bombing of ice was impossible due to very bad weather. Icebreakers were also unable to reach the bridge.

The main reason for the failure was a lack of effective protection of the bridge, resulting largely from the wrong decision to allocate protective measures to a second stage of construction. Other construction (and design) errors contributing to a collapse of the bridge included inconsistency between small-span design and ice regime in that area of the strait, construction of the bridge with incomplete engineering inquiry (which resulted in wavering on the needed ice protection measures), and lack of technical, material and work-force supply of the construction. Much of this stemmed from the project being rushed, and the design being based on the reuse of equipment and material that the Germans left from their incomplete bridge.

Design errors meant that even if the bridge was repaired, a collapse similar to one that happened in February 1945 could recur. Coupled with a necessity of massive funding of potentially futile repair works, the proposals to repair the bridge were doomed. On 31 May 1945, the State Defense Committee deemed repair of the destroyed bridge unfeasible, and it was decided to dismantle the remnants.

== Legacy ==
The failure of the 1944-1945 bridge did not mean immediate abandonment of the idea of a fixed link across the Kerch Strait by the Soviet government; indeed, construction of a new, permanent two-purpose (combined road-rail) bridge was decreed in 1949, and preparatory work had already started two years earlier. But in 1950 construction was halted and the Kerch Strait ferry line was created instead. From that time, the bridge idea fell into hibernation for decades: while it was proposed to construct such a link in one form or another from time to time, it did not become a reality or even go beyond proposals.

In 2014, some seven decades after the Soviet decision to build a railway bridge, the situation changed. By then the Soviet Union itself had dissolved and Crimea became separated from Russia not only geographically (by the Kerch Strait), but also by an international border, between Russia and the independent state of Ukraine. (Note: Crimea was transferred from the Russian SFSR to the Ukrainian SSR in 1954, and Russo-Ukrainian agreements during and after the dissolution of the Soviet Union adopted the uti possidetis approach, converting the Russo-Ukrainian administrative boundary as it was defined within the Soviet framework into an international border between Russia and Ukraine.) But in February and March 2014 Russia annexed Crimea and, amidst international non-recognition of the annexation and worsened relations with Ukraine (which at that time was the only state with overland links to Crimea), decided to build twin permanent road and rail bridges across the Kerch Strait. Dubbed the Crimean Bridge by the Russian government, the link became operational for road transport in 2018, opened to passenger trains at the end of 2019, and commenced carrying freight trains in 2020.
