= Temryuksky =

Temryuksky (masculine), Temryukskaya (feminine), or Temryukskoye (neuter) may refer to

- Temryuksky District, a district of Krasnodar Krai, Russia
- Temryukskoye Urban Settlement, a municipal formation which the Town of Temryuk in Temryuksky District of Krasnodar Krai, Russia is incorporated as
