= Kavkaz =

Kavkaz (Russian: Кавказ) may refer to:

- Caucasus, region for which Kavkaz is a local or historic name in several countries
- Port Kavkaz, a ferry port at Taman peninsula
- Port Kavkaz railway station, in Krasnodar Krai, Russia
- Kavkaz Center, a Chechen internet news agency
- "Kavkaz" ("Caucasus"), codename of a series of Russian military exercises
- KavKaz Nation, a criminal organization in New York City

== See also ==
- Tour of Kavkaz, a cycling race held annually in Russia
- Uralo-Kavkaz, an urban-type settlement in Krasnodon Municipality, Luhansk Oblast, Ukraine
