= Bagerovo–Vyshestebliyevskaya railway =

Bagerovo–Vyshesteblyevskaya
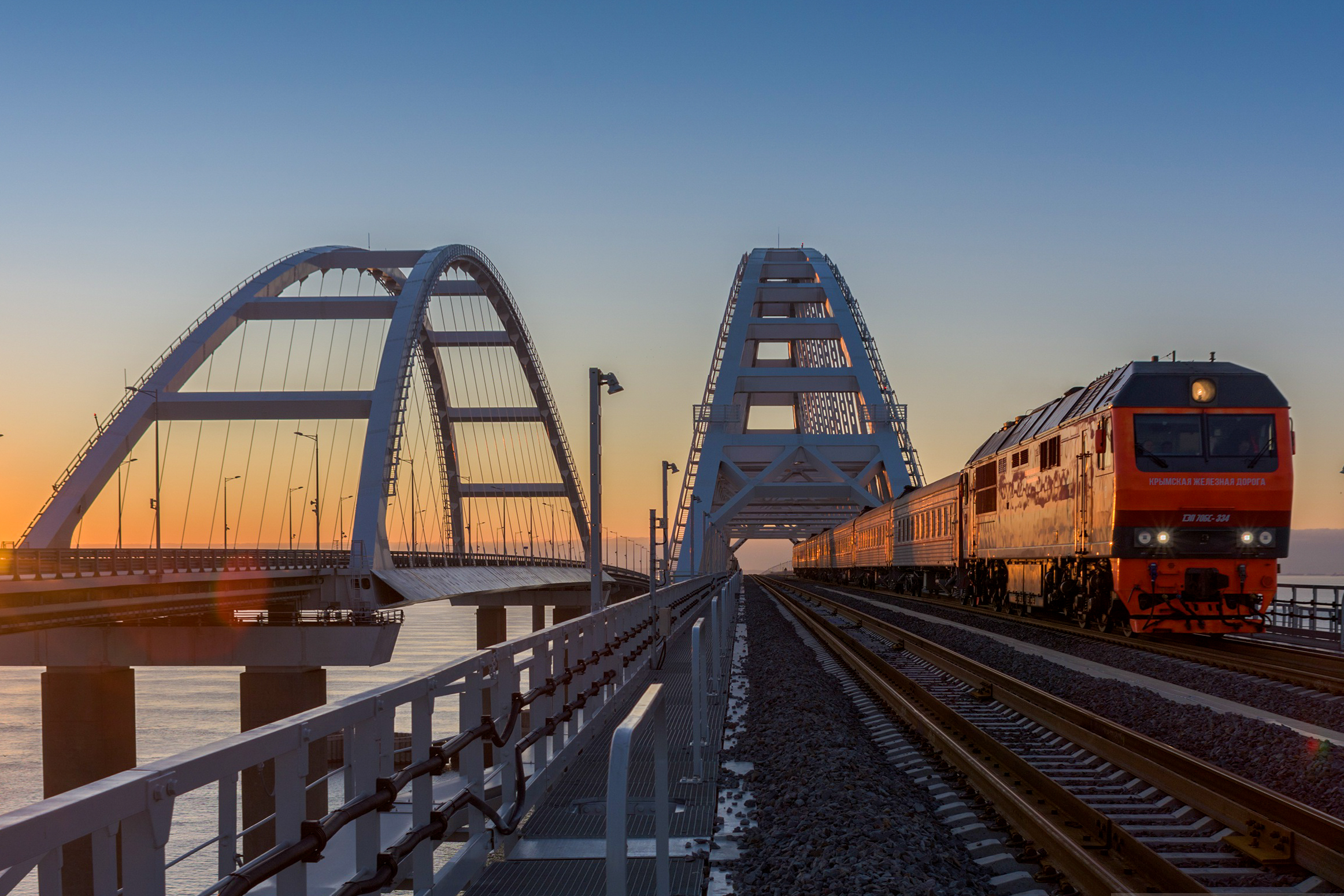
- Train crossing the Crimean Bridge

Overview
- Native name: Багерово — Вышестеблиевская
- Owner: Government of Russia
- Locale: Eastern Europe
- Termini: Vyshestebliyevskaya; Baherove
- Stations: 4

Service
- Type: Inter-city rail; Commuter rail; Freight rail
- System: North Caucasus Railway (Vyshestebliyevskaya–Taman); Crimea Railway (Taman–Bagerovo)
- Operators: Russian Railways; Crimea Railway

History
- Opened: 23 December 2019; 6 years ago
- Completed: 18 July 2019; 7 years ago
- Predecessor: Kerch Strait ferry line

Technical
- Line length: 42 km (26 mi)
- Number of tracks: 2–1
- Track gauge: 1,520 mm (4 ft 11 27/32 in)

"Bagerovo–Vyshesteblyevskaya" (Russian: Багерово — Вышестеблиевская) is a railway branch opened in 2019, which connects the Crimean Bridge into the rail networks at either end and replaced the train ferry between Kerch and Port Kavkaz. It is part of the Moscow–Crimea Main Line railway route. The construction of the branch line provides railway transit to the ports of the Crimea and the creation of a dry cargo area of the port of Taman. In combination with other enhancements, it is planned to allow reducing the time for the movement of passenger trains from Moscow to Simferopol from 2 days to 18 hours. A further branch, to the cargo yard in the area of the future Portovaya station at the Port of Taman, was put into operation in April 2016. This made it possible to bring the unloading station for delivery of construction materials 32 km closer to the construction of the Crimean Bridge. The entire line was put into temporary use in June 2019, and into permanent use in December 2019. The first regular passenger train passed on December 25, 2019.

== Description ==
The length of the section from Vyshestebliyevskaya station to the combined bridge is 42 kilometres (26 mi). The length of the Kerch area from the bridge to Bagerovo station is 17.8 kilometres (11.1 mi). The construction of the site on the Taman peninsula was envisaged during the construction of Taman port and includes the construction of a new Portovaya station, 8 kilometres (5.0 mi) from the transport crossing. The village of Taman is served by a new passenger station. A branch to the Kerch–Yuzhnaya station and the construction of a new park are planned on the Kerch site passing through the Cement Sloboda. Also on this site, construction of four overpasses, two bridges and a tunnel is planned.

The branch is planned to be electrified double-track. Initially, it was planned that electrification on the bridge would be carried out later, after the opening to traffic, but then it was decided to build a fully electrified line. In the first year of operation, the throughput should be 47 pairs of trains per day - 12 freight and 35 passenger, with the speed of freight trains up to 80 kilometres per hour (50 mph), and passenger trains up to 120 kilometres per hour (75 mph). The existing "Kerch–Dzhankoy" branch line is single-track and not electrified. To increase the capacity, a gradual electrification is planned from Bagerovo to the Vladislavovka junction station, then to the Dzhankoy station. In the future, the possibility of converting the "Soloynoye Ozero – Djankoy – Simferopol – Sevastopol" section (with a branch to Yevpatoria) from direct to alternating current and to reduce the time in transit by the construction of a straightened route "Vladislavovka – Simferopol" is considered. In January 2018, in connection with the start-up of commissioning works at three new combined-cycle stations in the Crimean energy system, a decision was made to build the railway electrified from the start.

== Construction ==
=== From the side of Taman ===
Part of the railway approach to the bridge from the side of Taman was realized within the framework of the construction of the port of Taman. The customer of the construction of railway approaches to the transport transition is the FC "Rostransmodernizatsiya," which in December 2014 concluded a contract with OAO RZD for the performance of the relevant work in the amount of 9.4 billion rubles. The deadline was the fourth quarter of 2018. In July 2015, within the framework of the construction and reconstruction of the railway infrastructure of the port of Taman and Vyshesteblievskaya station, the contract was received by OOO Trusyuzhstroy. In November 2017, the Russian Railways announced a tender for 12.68 billion rubles for the design and construction of railway approaches directly to the bridge. The tender was also won by OOO Trusyuzhstroy. By January 2015, the preparatory works were completed: the assembly of the shift camp at the Vyshesteblievskaya station was completed, the vegetation layer was cut in an area of 142,000 sq. M., the laying of the basement on an area of 90,000 sq. M. More than 73,000 m^{3} of soil was poured into the embankment, and about 12,000 m^{3} of sand.

=== Bridge transition ===
On July 18, 2019, the laying of rails on the Crimean Bridge was completed.

=== From the side of Kerch ===
By order of the Government of the Russian Federation of January 26, 2017, 101-r Stroygazmontazh Ltd. is the only contractor for the design and construction of a railway approach to the bridge across the Kerch Strait from Kerch, and the maximum contract value is 17 billion rubles. The operational period is scheduled for August 1, 2019, the date of final commissioning on December 1, 2019. The corresponding contract for access railway tracks from the Crimea was made in April 2017 between Roszheldor and OOO Stroygazmontazh. General design of approaches was fulfilled by ZAO Lenpromtransproekt.

== See also ==
- Crimean Bridge
- 2014 Russian annexation of Crimea
