= Kerch railway station =

Railway station in Kerch, Crimea

Coordinates: 45.3631°N 36.4275°E

Kerch
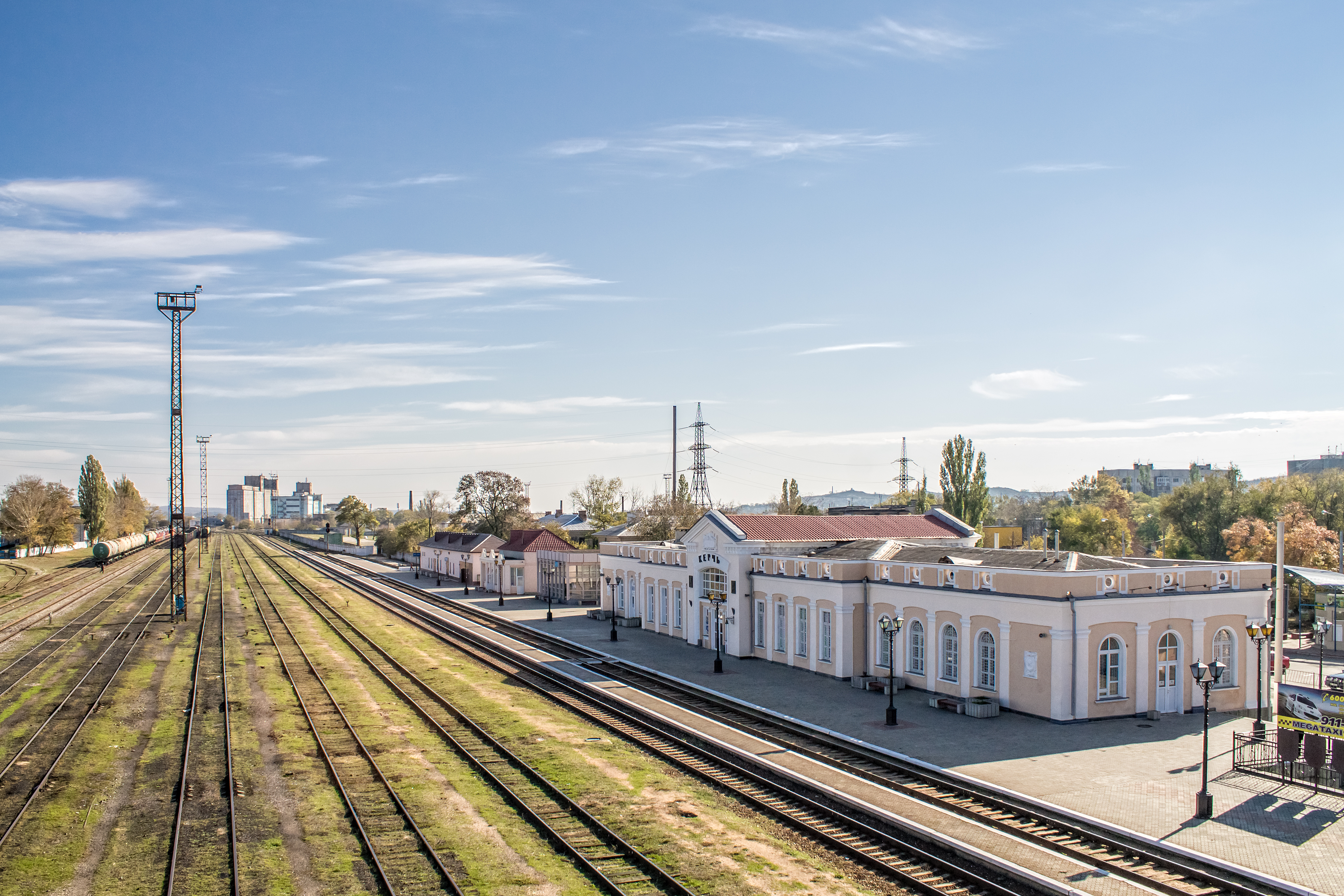
- View of the station

General information
- Location: Disputed: Ukraine (de jure); Russia (de facto); Kerch
- Owner: Disputed: Ukrainian Railways (Near-Dnipro Railways) (Ukraine, de jure); Crimea Railway (Russia, de facto)
- Line: Port Krym—Dzhankoy main line
- Platforms: 4 (3 island platforms)
- Tracks: 8

Construction
- Parking: Yes

Other information
- Station code: 47110
- Fare zone: 0

History
- Opened: 1900
- Former names: Kerch-2 (1900—1970)

Services
Preceding station	Crimea Railway (de jure Ukrzaliznytsia)	Following station
87 km towards Vladislavovka	Vladislavovka–Port Krym	Port Krym Terminus
Terminus	Kerch–Taman	Kerch-Pivdenna towards Taman
Location

Kerch Railway station (Russian: Керчь, Ukrainian: Керч, Crimean Tatar: Keriç) is the main railway station of Kerch in Crimea, a territory recognized by a majority of countries as part of Ukraine, but de facto under control and administration of Russia.

== Main information ==
The station can receive container shipments weighing up to 20 tons, and cargo, originating from ports of Kerch. The station is the destination of passenger and commuter trains on the line Vladislavovka—Port Krym. On other lines (Kerch — Kerch-South and Kerch — Port Krym) passenger traffic was from 2010 to 2014.

== History ==
The station opened in 1900 as Kerch-2.

In 1970 renamed Kerch.

From 1 August 2014 Russian Railways restored passenger traffic on the line Kerch — Port Krym (passenger train Simferopol — Rostov-on-Don — Moscow).

== Trains ==
- Djankoy — Kerch
- Simferopol — Moscow (via Rostov-on-Don)
- Sevastopol — Kerch (only in summer)

== Gallery ==
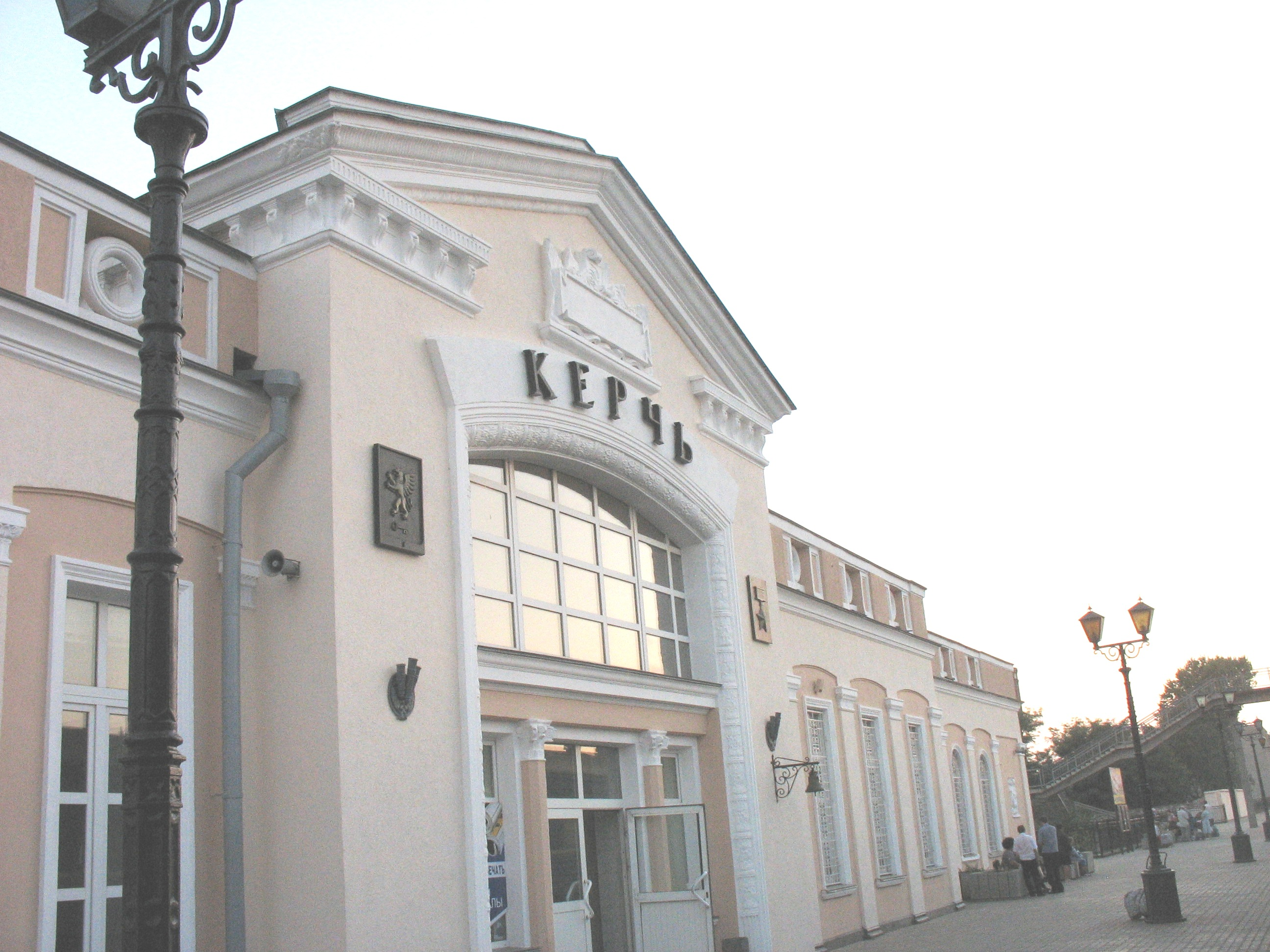
View of the station building from platform 1.

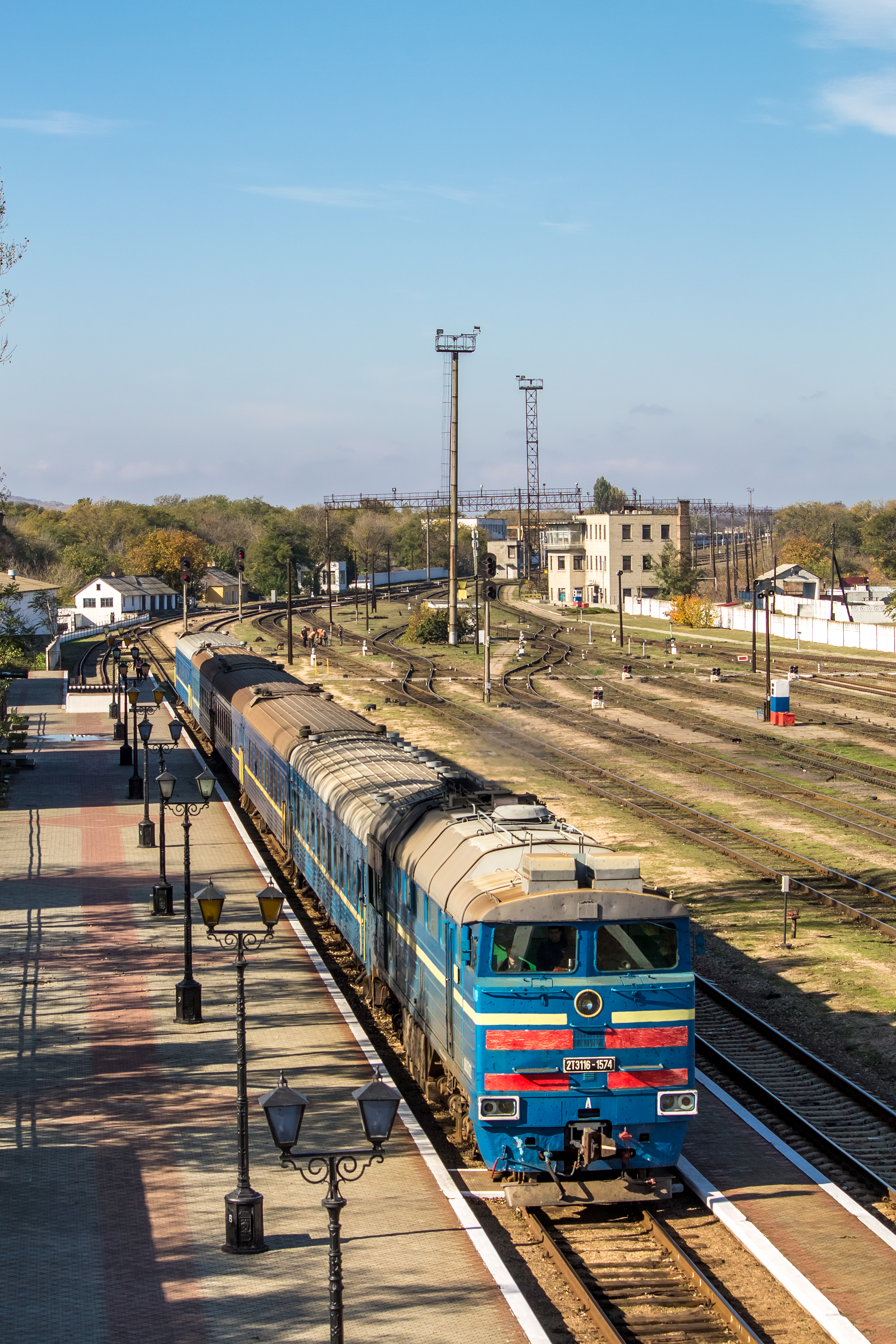
Suburban train Dzhankoy — Kerch.

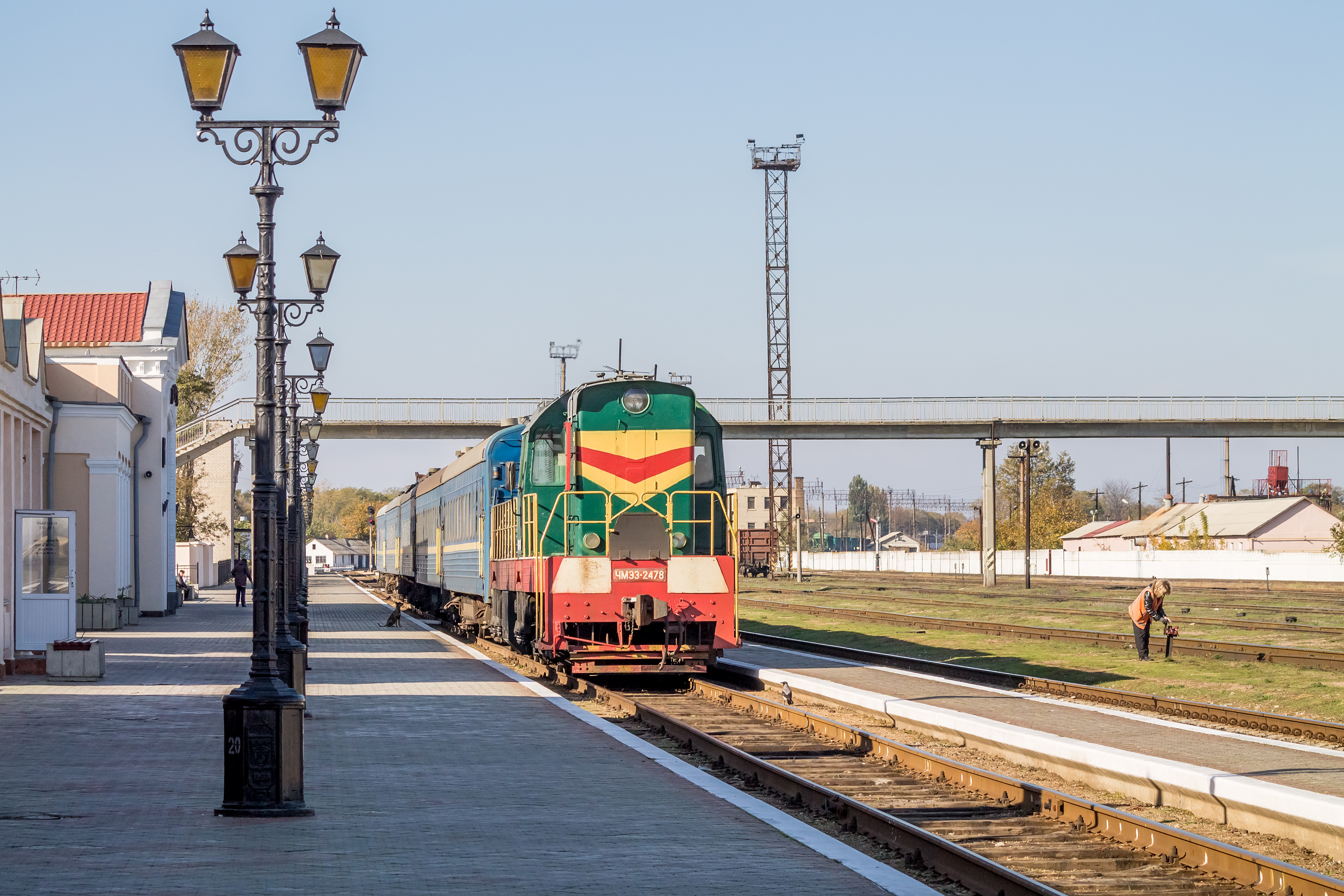
A train on platform 1.

== See also ==
- Crimean Bridge - rail link across Kerch Strait
