= Chushka =

Chushka may refer to:

- Chushka Spit
- Chushka (rural locality)
