= Chushka (rural locality) =

Chushka Чушка
- Settlement
- Location within Krasnodar Krai Location within Russia
- Coordinates: 45°19′50″N 36°40′00″E
- Country: Russia
- Region: Krasnodar Krai
- District: Temryuksky District
- Time zone: UTC+3:00

Chushka (Russian: Чушка́) is an abandoned village on the Chushka Spit in Zaporozhskoye Rural Settlement of Temryuksky District, in Krasnodar Krai, Russia. It is located beside Port Kavkaz, which includes the Kerch Strait ferry terminal, near the end of the spit.

== History ==
Prior to World War 2, catching and processing fish was the economic activity on the spit. The only buildings were the lighthouse keeper's house and temporary shelters for fishermen. After the Nazi Germans were driven from the Kuban bridgehead on the Taman Peninsula, the Soviets started building the Kerch railway bridge here in 1944, and the Chushka settlement was established for workers. The bridge opened, but was not fully completed, and was soon damaged by storms and ice, and was dismantled. At one time, six thousand people lived here, according to anecdote, and there was a maternity hospital, a clinic and a school. Drinking water was brought in tanks from the neighboring village of Ilich, as none was available naturally on the spit.

Many residents left after the failure of the bridge. A thousand workers remained, employed on construction of a port for the Kerch Strait ferry line, which was begun in the early 1950s and opened in 1954, and on the railway and in three fish factories. A hurricane flooded the village in 1969, after which residents began to be relocated to Ilich.

The port, now Port Kavkaz, expanded and new terminals for exporting oil and chemical products were built in the 1990s. Although residents were employed here, they were unable to remain living beside open areas of coal and sulphur, and all were relocated or compensated for loss of homes. The population dropped to 292 (2002 census), then 109 (2010 census), and by January 2008, had declined to just under 90. The port is gradually expanding and taking over the land where the village was.
