= Vladislavovka railway station =

Railway station in Vladislavovka, Crimea

Coordinates: 45.1683°N 35.3764°E

Vladislavovka-1
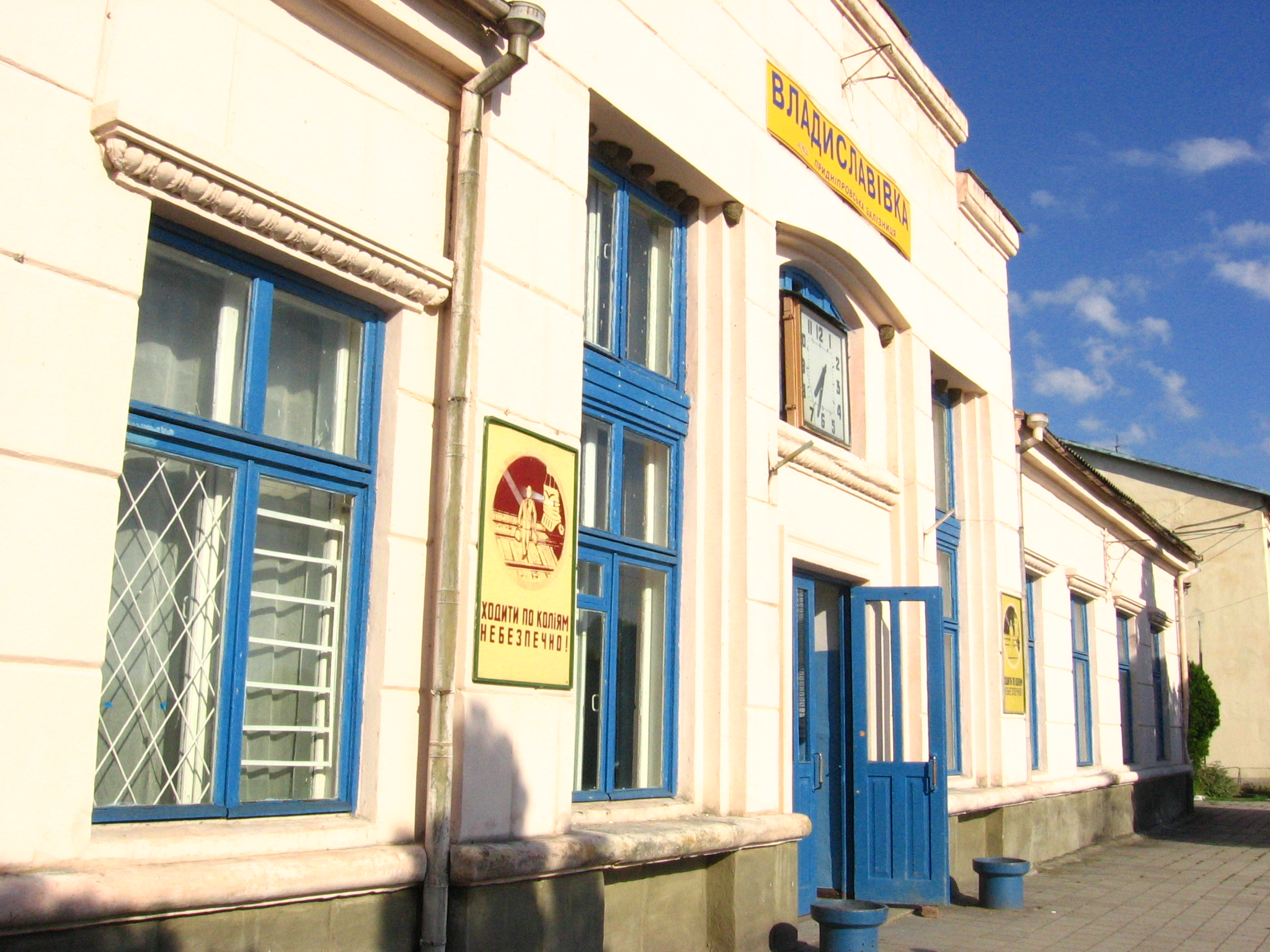
- View of the station from platform 1.

General information
- Location: Disputed: Ukraine (de jure); Russia (de facto); Vladislavovka, Kirovske Raion
- Owner: Disputed: Ukrainian Railways (Near-Dnipro Railways) (Ukraine, de jure); Crimea Railway (Russia, de facto)
- Platforms: 2 (1 island platforms)
- Tracks: 3

Construction
- Parking: yes

Other information
- Station code: 47154
- Fare zone: 6

History
- Opened: 1896

Services
Preceding station	Crimea Railway (de jure Ukrzaliznytsia)	Following station
Islam-Terek towards Dzhankoi	Dzhankoi–Feodosia	Aivazovska towards Feodosia
Terminus	Vladislavovka–Port Krym	Petrove towards Port Krym
Location

Vladislavovka (Russian: Владиславовка, Ukrainian: Владиславівка, Vladyslavivka) is a junction railway station in Vladislavovka village in Kirovske Raion of Crimea, a territory recognized by a majority of countries as part of Ukraine, but de facto under control and administration of Russia.

== Main information ==
The station is a junction for Dzhankoy—Feodosia and Dzhankoy—Port Krym lines.

== History ==
The station was opened in 1896 with the Dzhankoy — Feodosia line in Vladislavovka.

In 1900, after opening of the line to Kerch, Vladislavovka station became a hub. The station building was built by the architect M. I. Zarayskiy in 1953.

== Trains ==
- Moscow — Simferopol
- Dzhankoy — Kerch
- Feodosia — Vladislavovka
- Feodosia — Kirovskaya
- Feodosia — Armyansk
