= Fontalovskaya =

Rural locality in Temryuksky District, Russia

Coordinates: 45°21′50″N 36°56′5″E

Fontalovskaya (Russian: Фонта́ловская) is a rural locality (a selo) in Temryuksky District of Krasnodar Krai in Southern Russia. Population: 1,012 (2010 census); 1,003 (2002 census);
