= Port Krym railway station =

Railway station in Kerch, Crimea

Port Krym
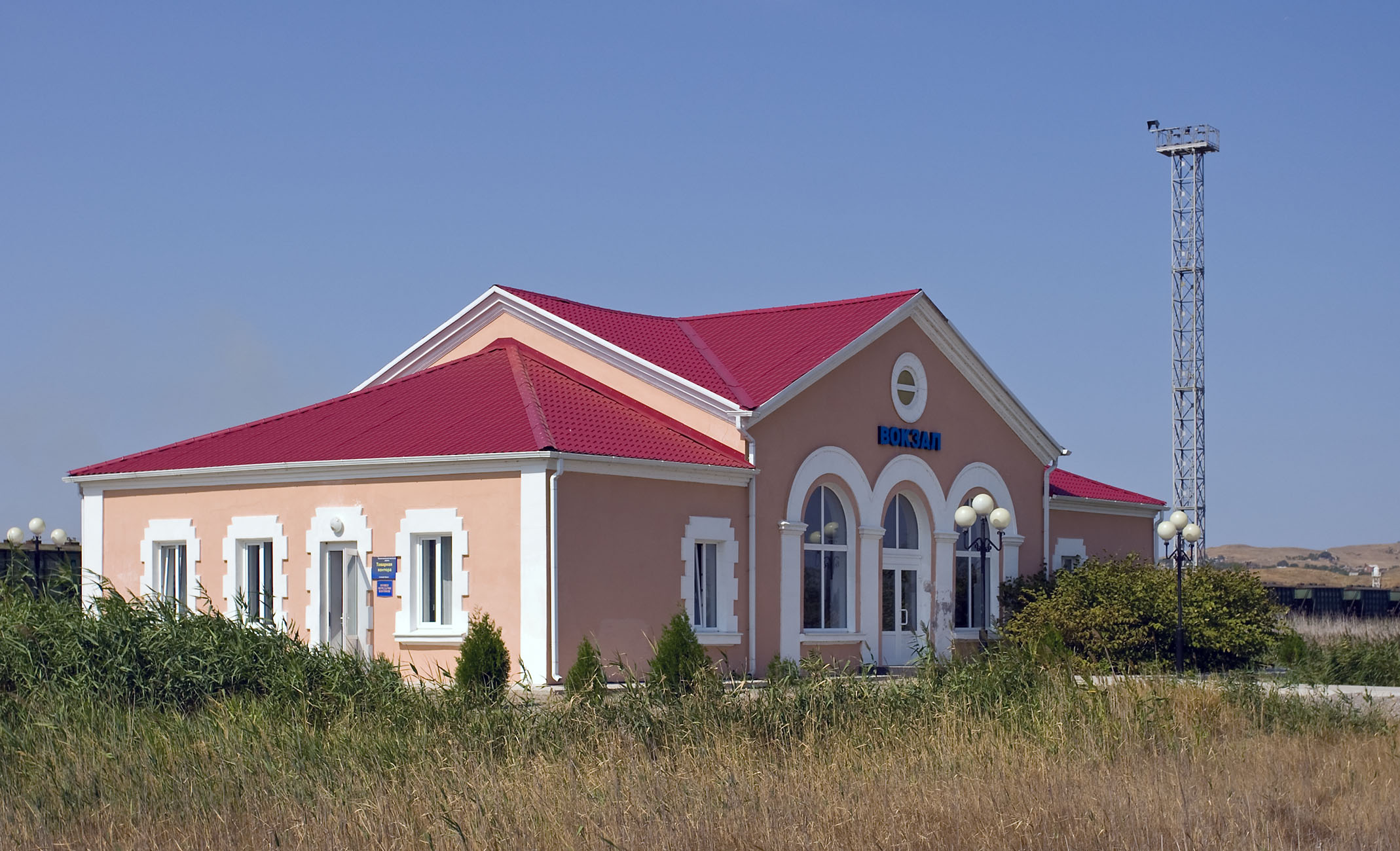

General information
- Location: Disputed: Ukraine (de jure); Russia (de facto); Port Krym
- Coordinates: 45°21′49″N 36°36′41″E
- System: railway terminal
- Owner: Disputed: Ukrainian Railways (Near-Dnipro Railways) (Ukraine, de jure); Crimea Railway (Russia, de facto)
- Platforms: 1
- Tracks: 4

Construction
- Parking: yes

History
- Opened: 1955

Services
Preceding station	Crimea Railway (de jure Ukrzaliznytsia)	Following station
Kerch towards Vladislavovka	Vladislavovka–Port Krym	Terminus
Former services
Preceding station	Ukrainian Railways	Following station
Terminus	Kerch Strait ferry line	Port Kavkaz Terminus
Location

Krym (Ukrainian: Крим, Russian: Крым) is a railway station that is located in the city of Kerch in Crimea, a territory recognized by a majority of countries as part of Ukraine, but de facto under control and administration of Russia.

The station is an important transportation hub. The station serves passengers and freight trains. Among the services provided at the station is only embarkment and disembarkment of passengers for commuter and regional lines. In a close vicinity is located Port Krym where trains are being transported by a train ferry.

== See also ==
- Port Kavkaz railway station
