= Port Kavkaz =

Port in Russia

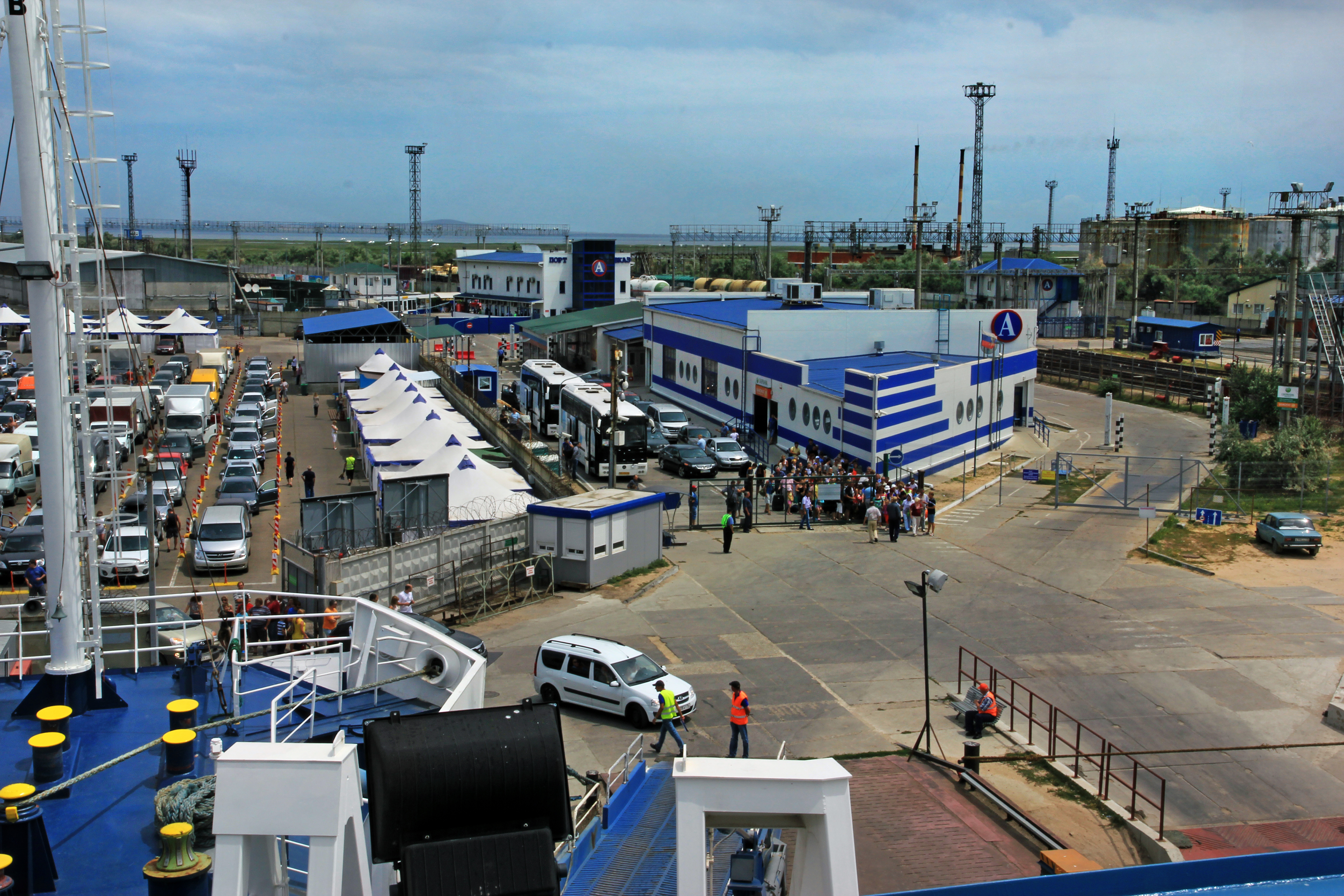
- Port Kavkaz in July 2014
- Interactive map of Port Kavkaz
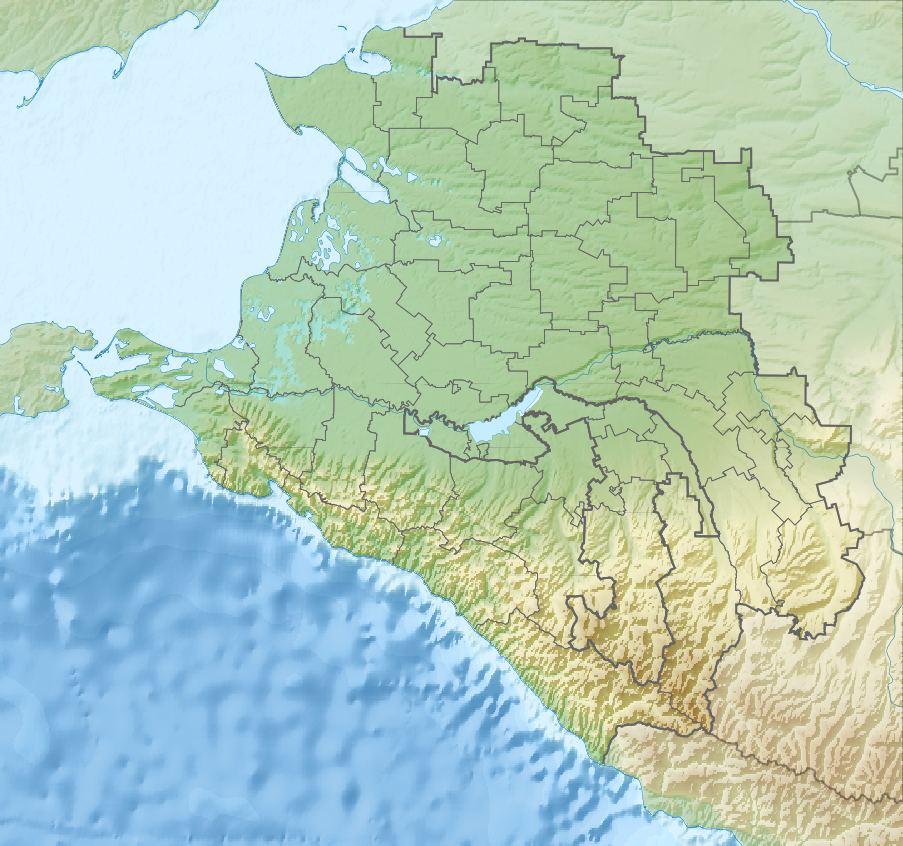
- Location within Krasnodar Krai
- Native name: Порт Кавказ (Russian)

Location
- Country: Russia
- Location: Temryuksky District, Krasnodar Krai
- Coordinates: 45°20′30″N 36°40′35″E
- UN/LOCODE: RUKZP

Details
- Type of Harbor: Sea
- Size: Medium

Statistics
- Website; Port Kavkaz

Port Kavkaz (Russian: Порт Кавказ) is a small harbour on the Chushka Spit in Krasnodar Krai, Russia, on the eastern side of Kerch Strait. It is adjacent to the village of Chushka, which is now largely deserted due to the toxic effects of the port.

The port is able to handle vessels up to 130 metres (430 ft) in length, 14.5 metres (48 ft) in breadth and with draft up to 5 metres (16 ft). It was the eastern terminal of the railroad and car Kerch Strait ferry line connecting Krasnodar Krai with Crimea (the western terminal of the ferry line is Port Krym). It is served by a railway line and the Port Kavkaz railway station. The southern zone of the port has been under renovation to increase the port's throughput to 4 megatonnes (3,900,000 long tons; 4,400,000 short tons).

== History ==
In August 2014 Russian Prime Minister Dmitry Medvedev signed a government order to enlarge the area of the port with the aim to increase cargo transportation volumes with the use of large ships. The borders of the port were changed to add a deep-water area south of the port of Taman for large ships to anchor. Plans included an additional 15–18 anchor places for loading large ships. The additional area is 18.4 km^{2} (7.1 sq mi) with depths of 26–27.6 m (85–91 ft).

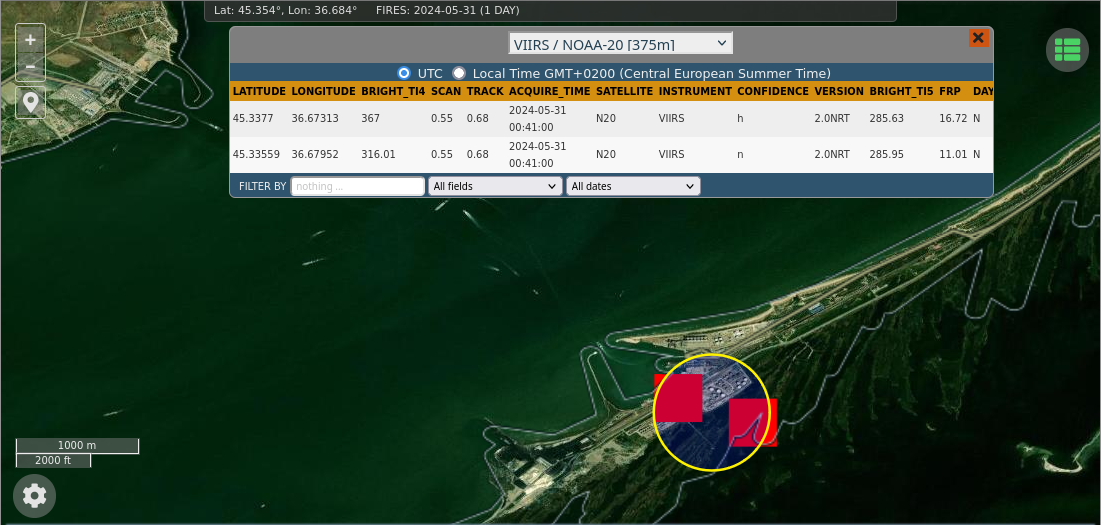
NASA's FIRMS detected fires on 31 May 2024 00:41 (UTC) in Port Kavkaz

During the Russian invasion of Ukraine, at the end of May 2024 Ukrainian Neptune missiles struck an oil depot at the port, which stored oil products bound for Crimea. Two railway train ferries were damaged in May.

In a July attack the MV Slavyanin railway train ferry was damaged.

On 22 August 2024, a rail ferry carrying wagons of fuel was struck by a Ukrainian missile in Port Kavkaz. One source suggested a Neptune missile hit the MV Conroe Trader ferry. Simultaneously the Kerch Bridge was closed due to a "missile threat".

Overnight on Sunday and Monday of 5 and 6 April 2026, the MV Slavyanin rail ferry was again struck and destroyed by Ukrainian military drone. It was the last train ferry crossing the Kerch Strait after the rail ferry ship MV Avangard was hit in March.
