= Vyshestebliyevskaya =

Place in Krasnodar Krai, Russia

Vyshestebliyevskaya Вышестеблиевская
- Stanitsa
- Interactive map of Vyshestebliyevskaya
- Location of Vyshestebliyevskaya Vyshestebliyevskaya (Krasnodar Krai)
- Coordinates: 45°11′40″N 36°59′58″E
- Country: Russia
- Federal subject: Krasnodar Krai
- Administrative district: Temryuksky District
- Founded: 1794
- Elevation: 9 m (30 ft)

Population (2010 Census)
  - Total: 3,779
  - Estimate (2021): 4,562 (+20.7%)
- Time zone: UTC+3 (MSK)
- Postal code: 353541
- OKTMO ID: 03651404101

Vyshestebliyevskaya (Russian: Вышестеблиевская) is a rural locality (a stanitsa) in the Temryuksky District of Krasnodar Krai, Russia. Population: 3,779 (2010 census); 4,257 (2002 census).
