= Temryuk =

Town in Krasnodar Krai, Russia

Temryuk Темрюк
- Town
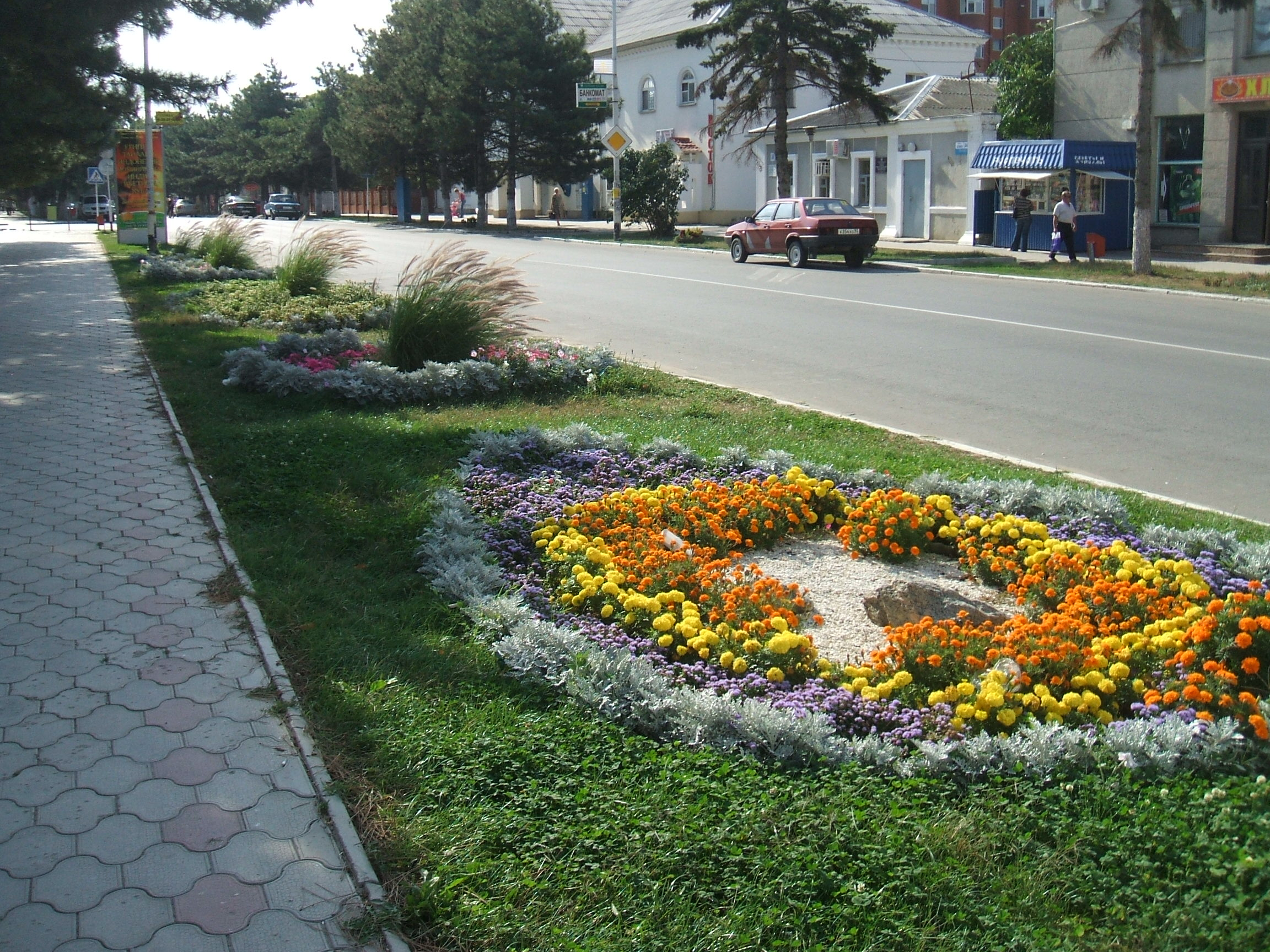
- Lenina Street in Temryuk

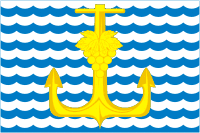
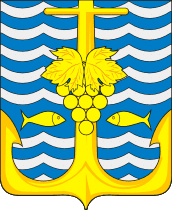
- Flag Coat of arms
- Interactive map of Temryuk
- Location of Temryuk Temryuk (Krasnodar Krai)
- Coordinates: 45°16′N 37°22′E
- Country: Russia
- Federal subject: Krasnodar Krai
- Administrative district: Temryuksky District
- TownSelsoviet: Temryuk
- Founded: 1556 (Julian)
- Town status since: 1860
- Elevation: 10 m (33 ft)

Population (2010 Census)
  - Total: 38,046
  - Estimate (2025): 40,415 (+6.2%)

Administrative status
  - Capital of: Temryuksky District, Town of Temryuk

Municipal status
  - Municipal district: Temryuksky Municipal District
  - Urban settlement: Temryukskoye Urban Settlement
  - Capital of: Temryuksky Municipal District, Temryukskoye Urban Settlement
- Time zone: UTC+3 (MSK)
- Postal code: 353500–353508
- OKTMO ID: 03651101001

Temryuk (Russian: Темрю́к, IPA: [tʲɪmˈrʲʉk]) is a town and the administrative center of Temryuksky District in Krasnodar Krai, Russia, located on the Taman Peninsula on the right bank of the Kuban River not far from its entry into the Temryuk Bay, amid a field of mud volcanoes. The seaport of Temryuk is situated 4 kilometers (2.5 mi) from the town itself. Population: 41,413 (2020), 38,046 (2010 census); 36,118 (2002 census); 33,163 (1989 Soviet census); 26,600 (1975).

== History ==
Tens of thousands of years ago, the Azov Sea was much larger and covered the delta of the Kuban River. Deposition of silt by the Kuban gradually pushed out the sea and shaped the delta with numerous shallow estuaries. Frequent eruptions of the mud volcanoes contributed to this deposition process. There are about 25 mud volcanoes in the area and some are still active.

Situated close to the site of ancient Tmutarakan, Temryuk was vied by various powers as a vantage point at the mouth of the Kuban River. The first recorded settlement on the site was Tumnev, a Tatar fortress, which passed to the Genoese merchants in the 14th century. It was known as Copa until occupied by the Crimean Khanate in 1483.

The Russians, allied with a local potentate, Temryuk of Kabardia, captured Tumnev and built a fortress called New Temryuk there. The Crimean Tatars retook the fort in 1570; it was known as Adis for a century to come. In the 18th century, the site was settled by the Cossacks, whose stanitsa was incorporated as the town of Temryuk in 1860. . The Germans took the Kuban Gorge (General Konrad Pass) and the town of Temyruk in 1942–43.

== Economy ==
The port of Temryuk is 4 kilometers (2.5 mi) from the town and is operated by Mechel Group. It is southern Russia's main export port for liquefied petroleum gas, and also exports oil and transships general cargo, bulk cargo, and grain.

== Administrative and municipal status ==
Within the framework of administrative divisions, Temryuk serves as the administrative center of Temryuksky District. As an administrative division, it is, together with three rural localities, incorporated within Temryuksky District as the Town of Temryuk. As a municipal division, the Town of Temryuk is incorporated within Temryuksky Municipal District as Temryukskoye Urban Settlement.

== Gallery ==
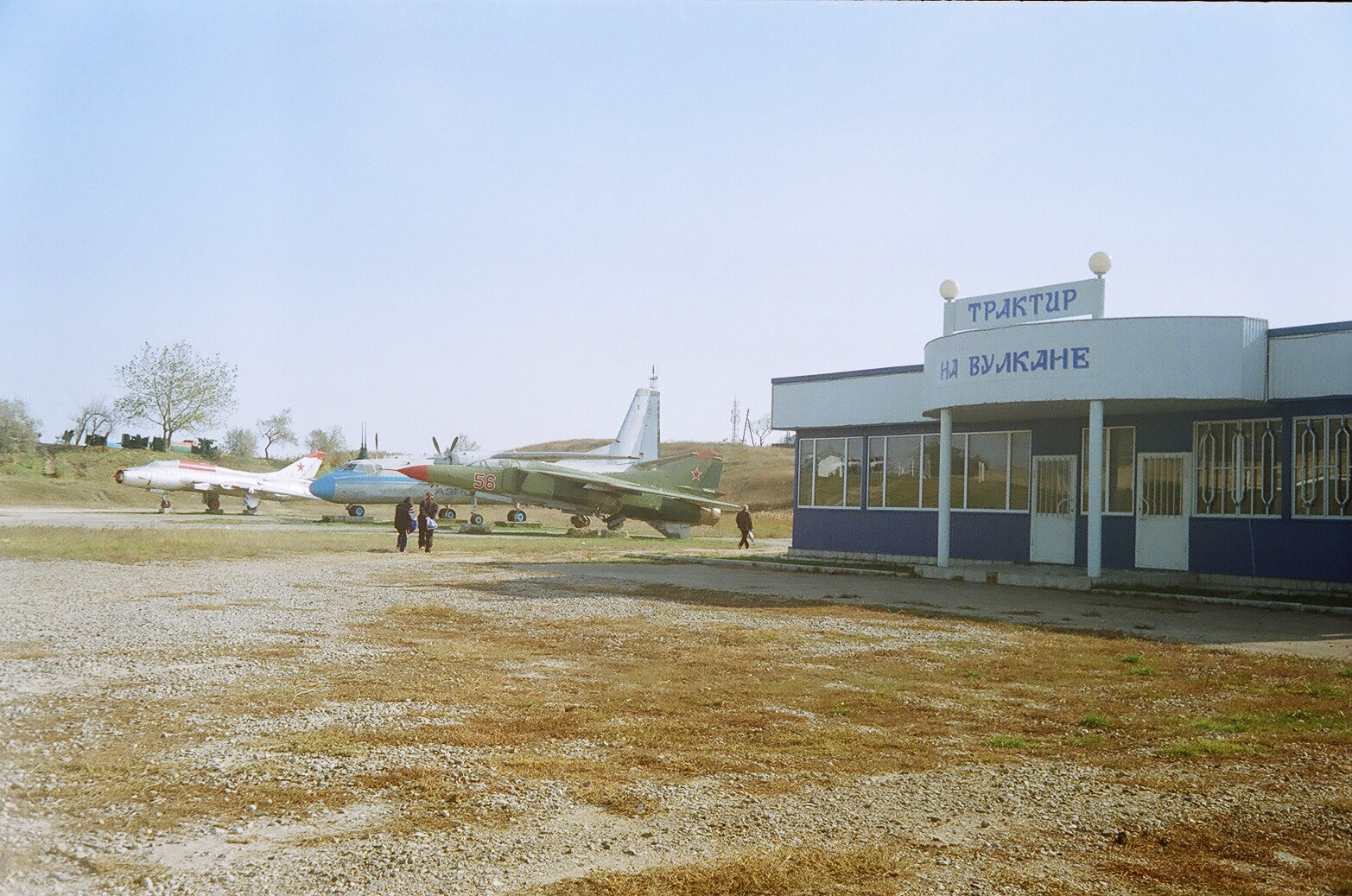
Voyennaya Gorka, a military vehicle museum on the slope of a mud volcano in Temryuk

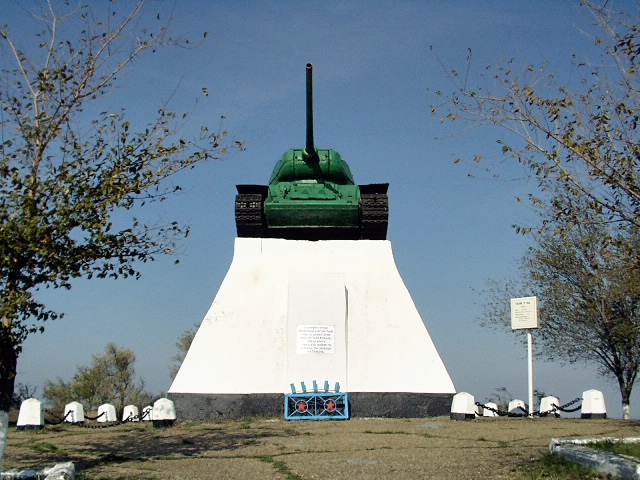
A memorial devoted to the Defense of Temryuk during World War II

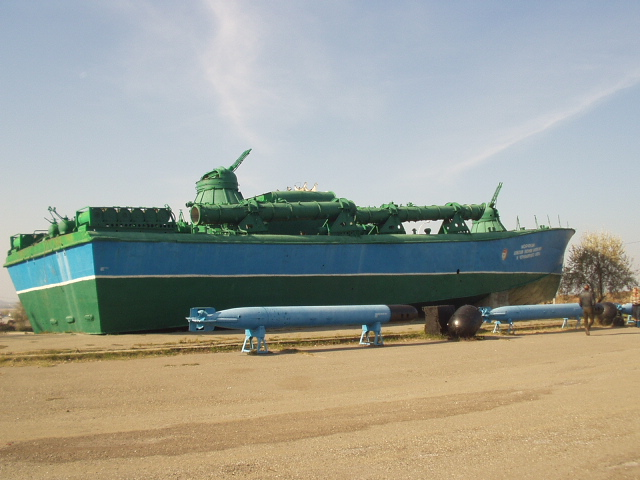
A World War II motor gun boat on exhibit at Voyennaya Gorka

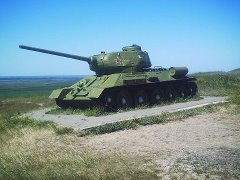
T-34 tank on a pedestal on a military hill at Temryuk

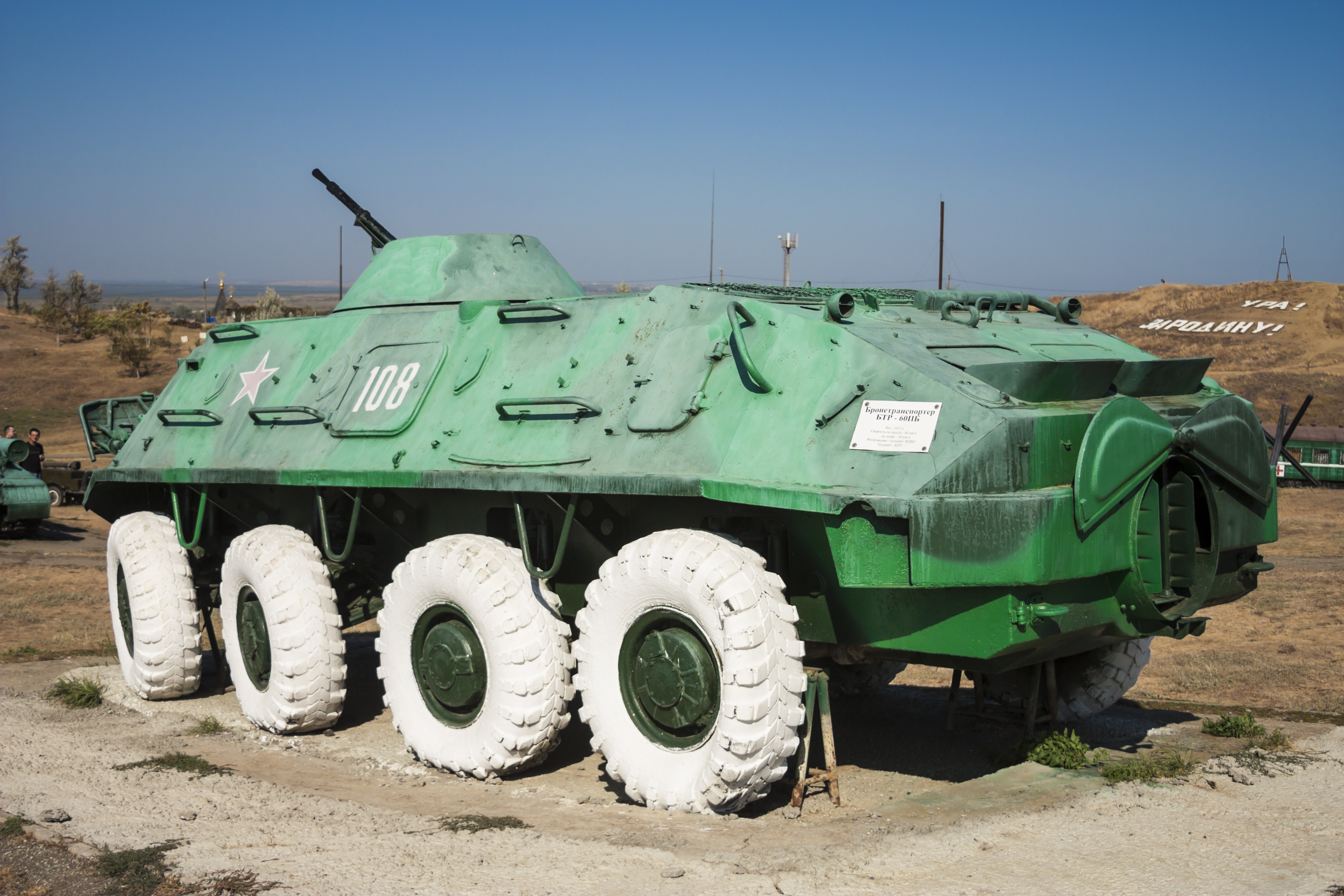
BTR specified in the Military Museum Hill

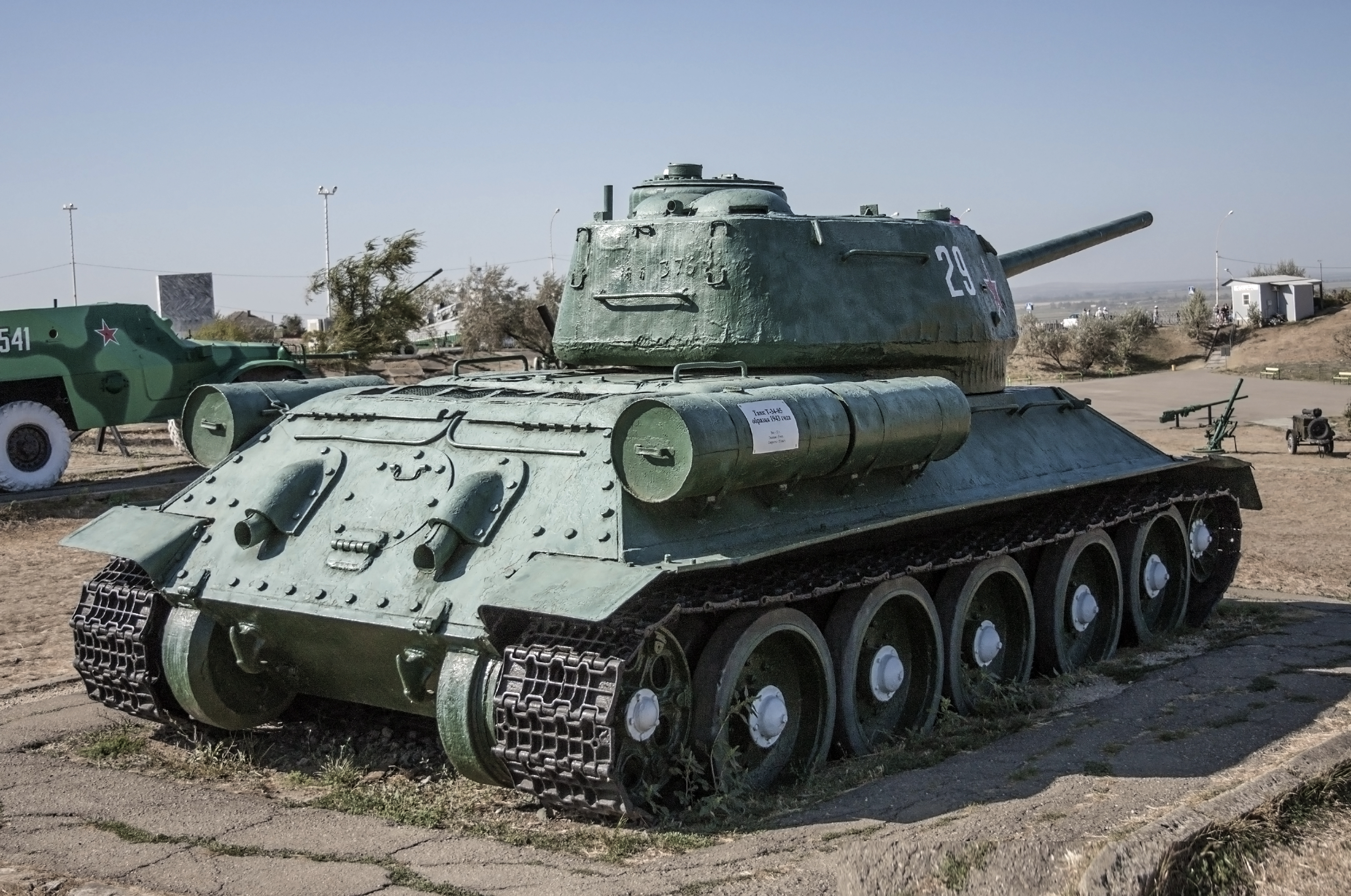
The T 34-85 exhibition at the Museum of Military Hill

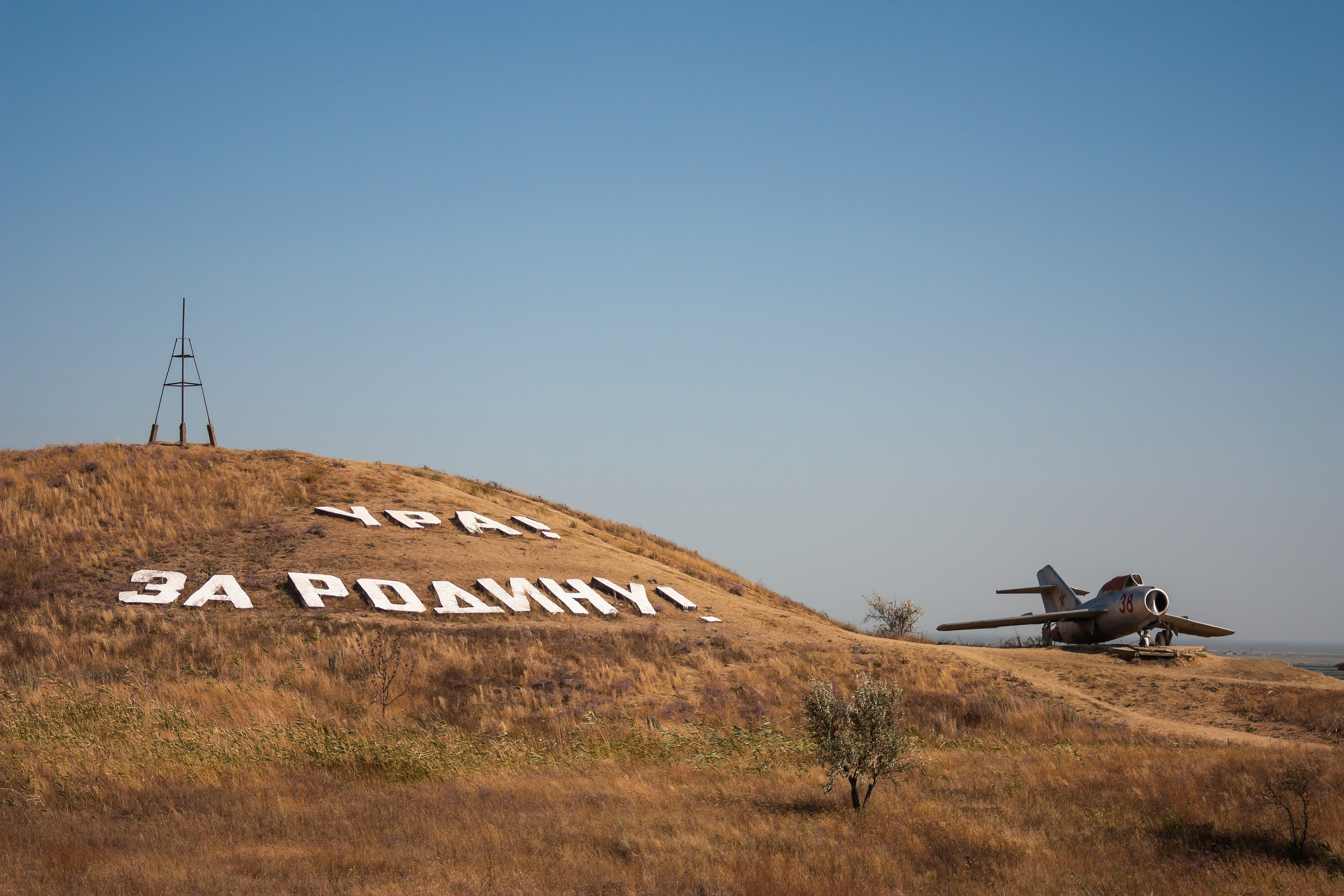
General view of the mountains "Miska" which is a museum of "Voennaya Gorka"
