= Sennoy, Krasnodar Krai =

Village in Temryuksky District in Krasnodar Krai, Russia

Coordinates: 45°17′03″N 36°59′27″E

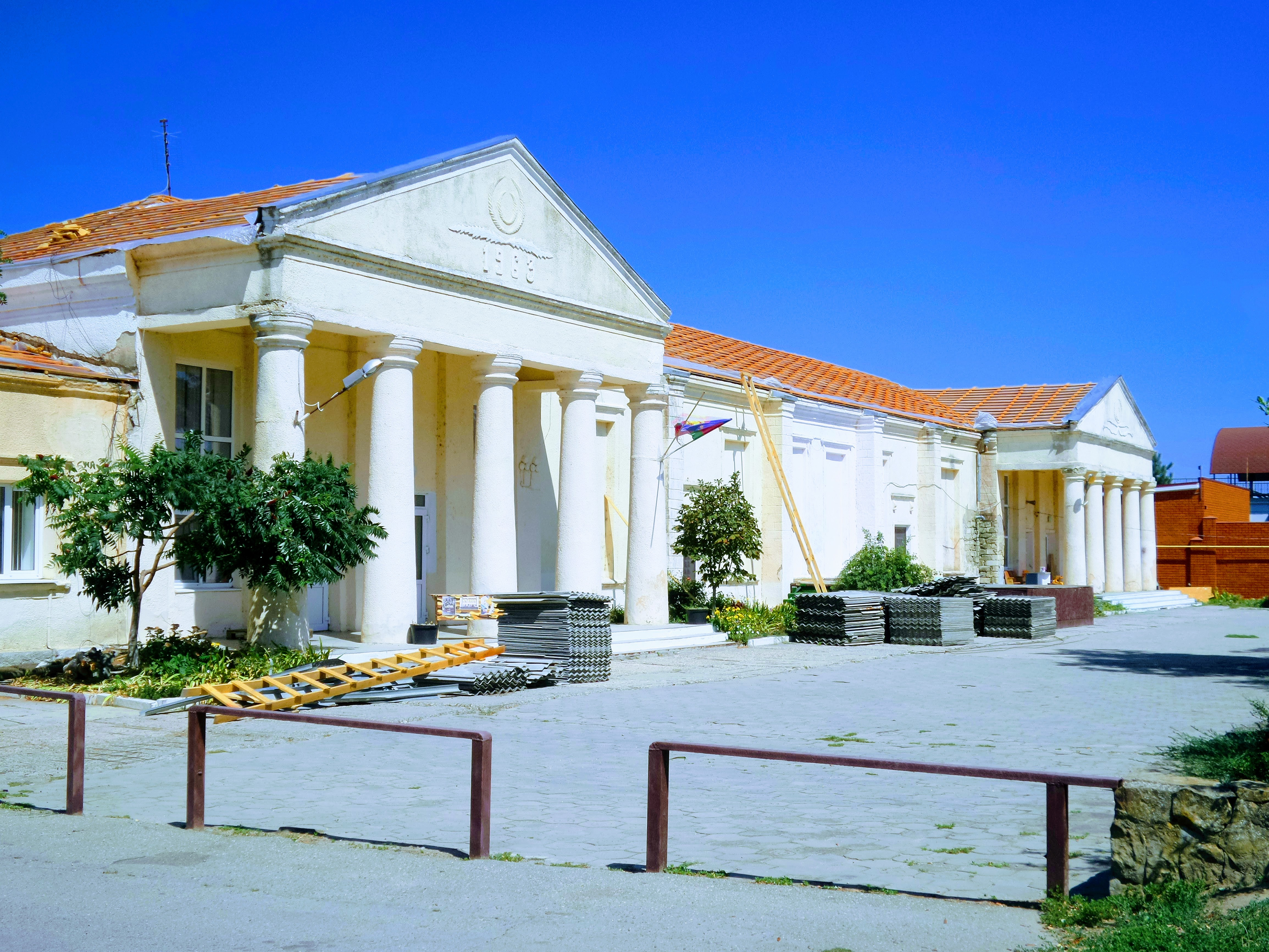
Palace of Culture in Sennoy

Sennoy (Russian: Сенной; Ukrainian: Сінний, romanized: Sinnyi) is a rural locality (a selo) in the Temryuksky District of the Krasnodar Krai, Russia. Population: 3,736 (2010 census); 4,129 (2002 census);
