= Port Krym =

Port in Russian-occupied Crimea

Port Krym Порт Крым
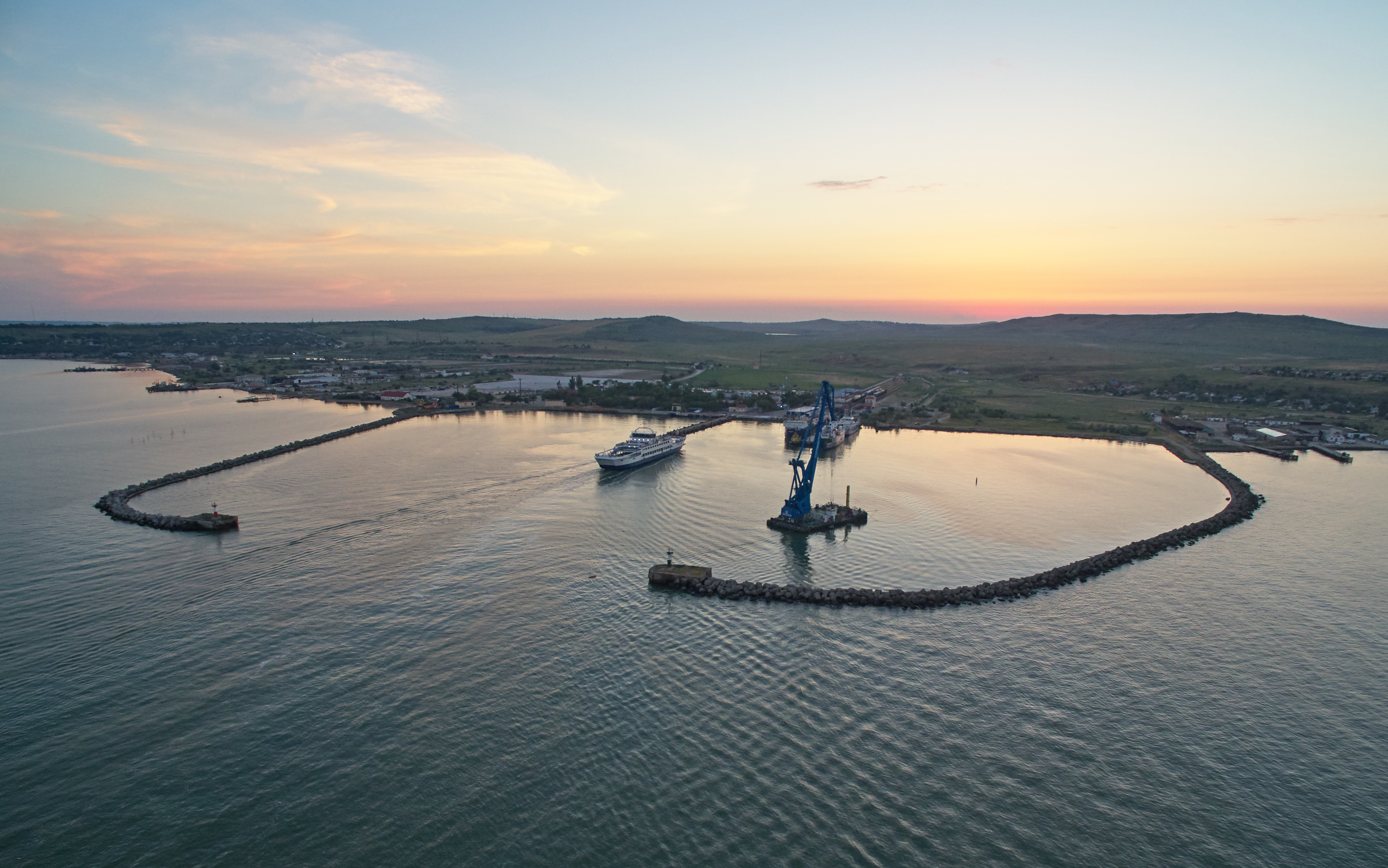

- Location in Ukraine Crimea

Location
- Country: Ukraine (de jure); Russia (de facto)
- Location: Kerch, Crimea
- Coordinates: 45.364°N 36.628°E

Details
- Opened: 1954
- Operated by: State Company Kerch Ferry (suspended); ANShIP
- Type of harbour: Natural/Artificial
- General manager: Mykola Kovyrnychenko

Statistics
- Annual cargo tonnage: 7,000
- Passenger traffic: 330,000 people
- Website www.gos-parom.ru

Port Krym (Russian: Порт Крым, Ukrainian: Порт Крим, Crimean Tatar: Qırım Limanı - literally Port Crimea) is a port in Crimea. It is located on the western shore of Kerch Strait, in the north-eastern part of Kerch city near a settlement of Zhukivka. Next to the port is located the Krym railway station.

Port Krym had the Kerch Strait ferry connection with Port Kavkaz on the eastern (Russian) shore of the strait. The port is also a base for pilot boats which guide navigation through the Strait of Kerch. The port is served by a fleet of three ships which were the property of the Ukrainian State Company "Kerch Ferry" as well as two more ships of the Russian company "ANShIP" which provides railroad ferry connection.

Port Krym was a transition point on the E97 (M17) where it terminated and resumed on the Russian coast at the Port Kavkaz. The type of crossing was ferry, status - local. The types of transportation crossings were passenger and freight.

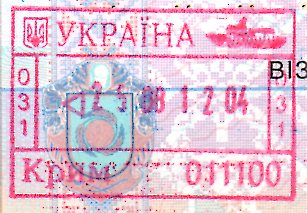
Stamp issued by the Krym port of entry before the Russian annexation
