= Kerch Strait ferry line =

Former ferry line across the Kerch Strait

Coordinates: 45.3532°N 36.6504°E

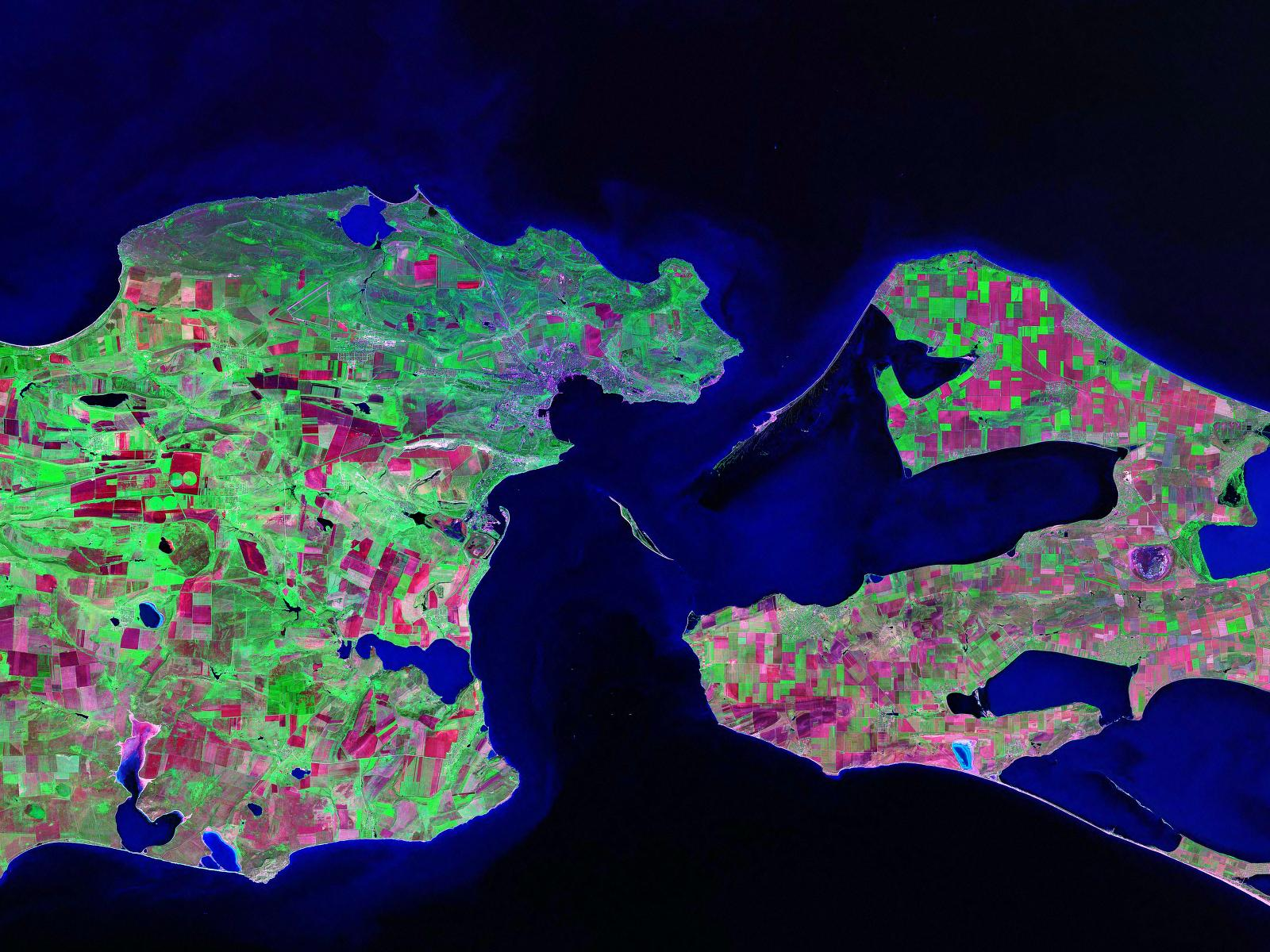

Satellite image of Kerch Strait. Left side is Crimea (green dot represents Kerch). Right side is Taman Peninsula, Russia (red dot represents Chushka Spit.)

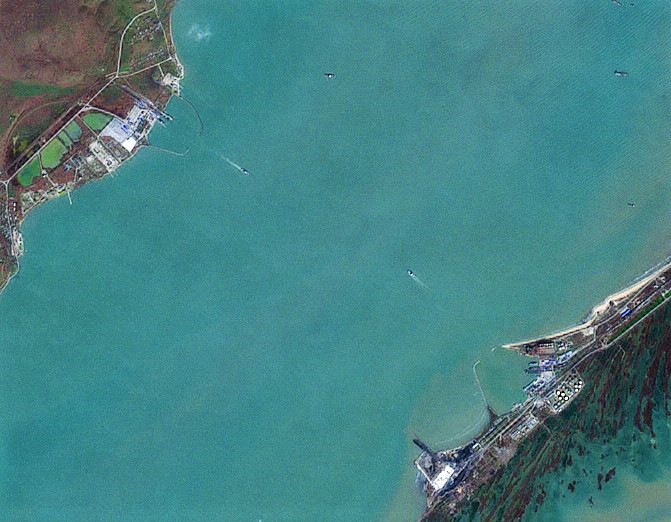
March 2018 satellite image by Sentinel-2: Port Krym (Harbour Crimea) at top left corner, Port Kavkaz (Harbour Caucasus) at bottom right corner; two ferries are moving across the Strait of Kerch.

The Kerch Strait ferry line (Russian: Керченская паромная переправа (also, переправа «Крым — Кавказ»), Ukrainian: Керченська поромна переправа) was a ferry connection across the Strait of Kerch that connected the Crimean Peninsula and Krasnodar Krai.

The ferry ran across the narrowest part of the strait (about 5 kilometres (3 mi)) between Port Krym (harbour Crimea) by the city of Kerch and Port Kavkaz (harbour Caucasus) on the Chushka Spit, on the site of the former Kerch railway bridge. It carried passengers, automotive and railroad transport. The ferry was on the European route E97 and connected its parts, А290 (formerly M25) and М-17 highways.

After the 2014 Russian annexation of Crimea, ferry traffic peaked, but as the Crimean Bridge across the strait opened in 2018–2020, it overtook the traffic flow from the ferry, rendering its usage for transportation financially unfeasible (there is no toll involved for the use of the bridge), and the ferry line stopped operations in late 2020.

Intermittent ferry line operations were resumed following the 2022 Crimean Bridge explosion.

== History ==
=== 1954–2014 ===
The ferry line was established in 1954, on the site of the former Kerch railway bridge. From 1993 to 2004 railroad transportation was suspended due to replacement of aged train-ferries.

Since the dissolution of the Soviet Union, it was administered by Russia and Ukraine through the joint venture “Crimea-Kuban Crossing”. In 1998, this company was reorganized into a Ukrainian state-owned enterprise, "Kerch Strait ferry line".

=== After the 2014 Russian occupation of Crimea ===
On 17 March 2014, during the Russian annexation of Crimea, the company was nationalised by the Republic of Crimea, and had been since administered by Russia only.

The use of the ferry rose sharply after the annexation, and in June 2015, the ferry operator considered a daily passenger count of 11,000 normal.

The 2018 opening of the road section of the new Crimean Bridge, crossing the strait about 10 km further south, greatly reduced demand for the ferry. In November 2019, it was announced that passenger and freight ferries had ceased operation, as the service was not breaking even. While occasional ferries were still used for rail freight transportation, the opening of the rail bridge across the strait overtook that last remaining traffic, and at the end of September 2020 the ferry operator AnRussTrans ceased operating the rail ferry line, with the last sailing taking place on 28 September 2020. AnRussTrans had also kept the Nikolay Aksenenko passenger ferry on stand-by until then.

=== During the Russo-Ukrainian war (2022-present) ===
On 8 October 2022, following the Crimean Bridge explosion, Russia restarted operation of the ferry line using the Kerch-2 ferry.

On 30 May 2024, the Russian railway ferries Avangard and Conro Trader were hit by Ukrainian ATACMS missiles. While the Avangard showed a big hole in the upper deck, rolled after impact, and reportedly ran aground, the Conro Trader was presumably not as critically damaged. As these were the only ferries capable of transporting railroad cars across the Kerch Strait, this forced the Russian authorities to resume transporting fuel across the Crimean Rail Bridge by 8 June 2024, despite the risk of another Ukrainian strike as in 2022. After the May 2024 attacks, five other Russian ferries were still in service: two small car ferries named Kerch-2 and Yeysk, and three large car ferries named Lavrentiy, Panagia, and Maria. After three weeks of preparations, the Avangard was towed to the Kerch shipyard, and at some point thereafter apparently repaired and returned to service, only to be hit and put out of action again in March 2026. Meanwhile, the Conro Trader suffered another attack, this time by drones, on 23 July, killing one and wounding five.

The ferry boat Elena II, flying the flag of Togo, was acquired by Russian state-owned enterprise Rosmorport in September 2024, renamed Panagia and reflagged to the Russian Federation, and sent to Sevastopol in February 2025, where it lay in port for four months until it began operating ferry services on the Kerch Strait in June 2025.

As of 13 March 2026, the Russian government was operating at least five different ferries on the Kerch Strait:

- The Slavyanin and Avangard railway ferries. Both ferries were reportedly struck on the night of 13–14 March 2026; while the Avangard was put out of action (again, after an earlier ATACMS strike on 30 May 2024 had temporarily disabled it), the Slavyanin was only damaged but remained afloat. The Slavyanin was struck again on the night of 5–6 April 2026 by drones of the Ukrainian Military Intelligence (HUR) Department of Active Operations. According to later satellite images, the Slavyanin was tied up in a dock, heavily listing, and its bow half underwater.
- The Panagia and Lavrentiy road ferries and an unnamed ferry (likely the Maria). It was known that the Panagia and Lavrentiy ships had been used to transfer military equipment, weapons, ammunition and fuel from Russia to Crimea. All three were struck by drones on 21 June 2026, after which their service was suspended according to the Krasnodar Krai Operational Headquarters. Satellite images verified by Institute for the Study of War geolocated three different ferries on fire on the Kerch Strait ferry crossing between the Port of Kerch and Port Kavkaz on 21 June 2026.

On the night of 12–13 July 2026, the Security Service of Ukraine (SBU) claimed to have hit both the Yeysk and Maria ferries in the Port of Kerch, as well as the Panagia and Lavrentiy ferries in Port Kavkaz.

== Gallery ==
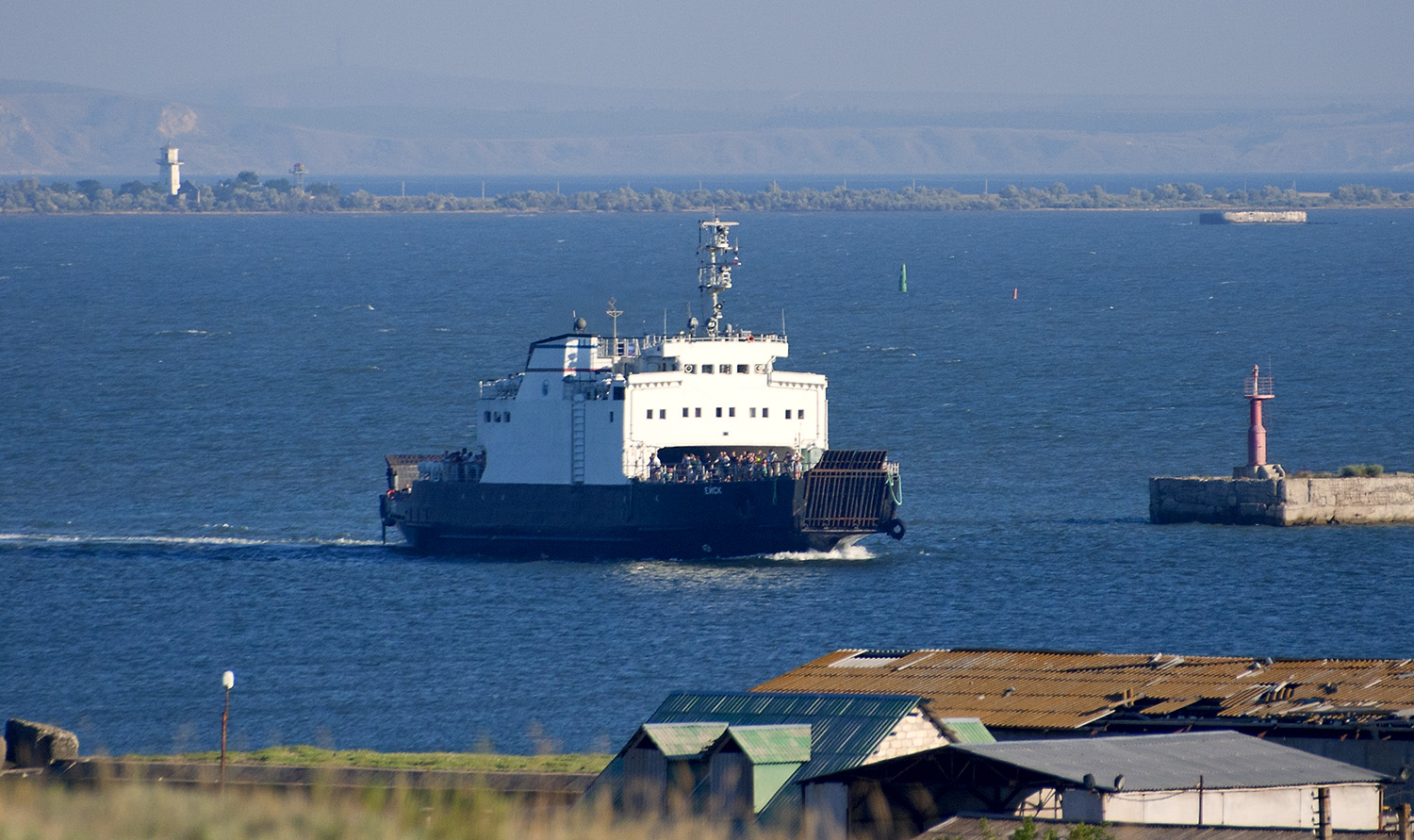
Yeysk road ferry (2005)

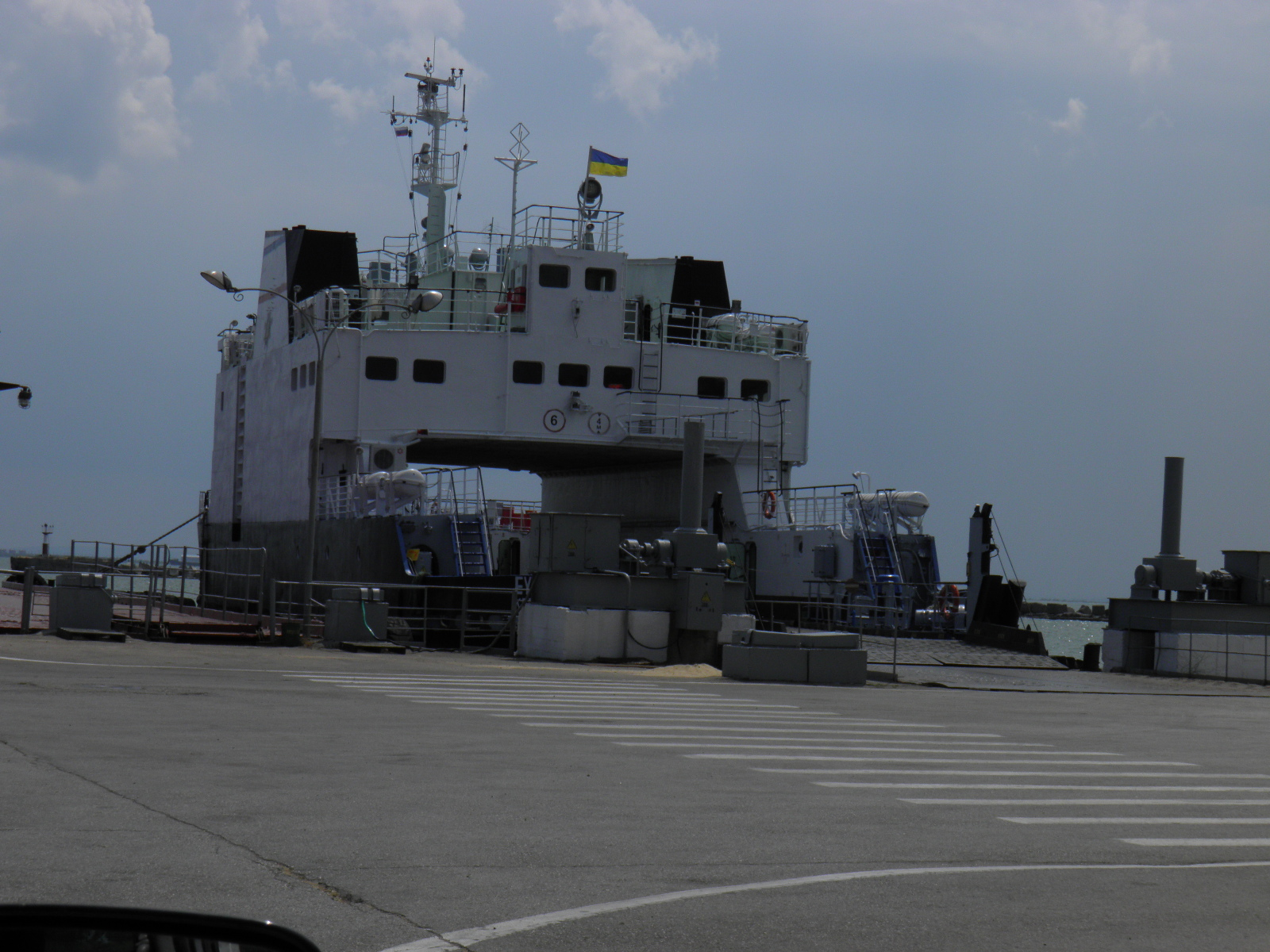
Yeysk road ferry (2011)

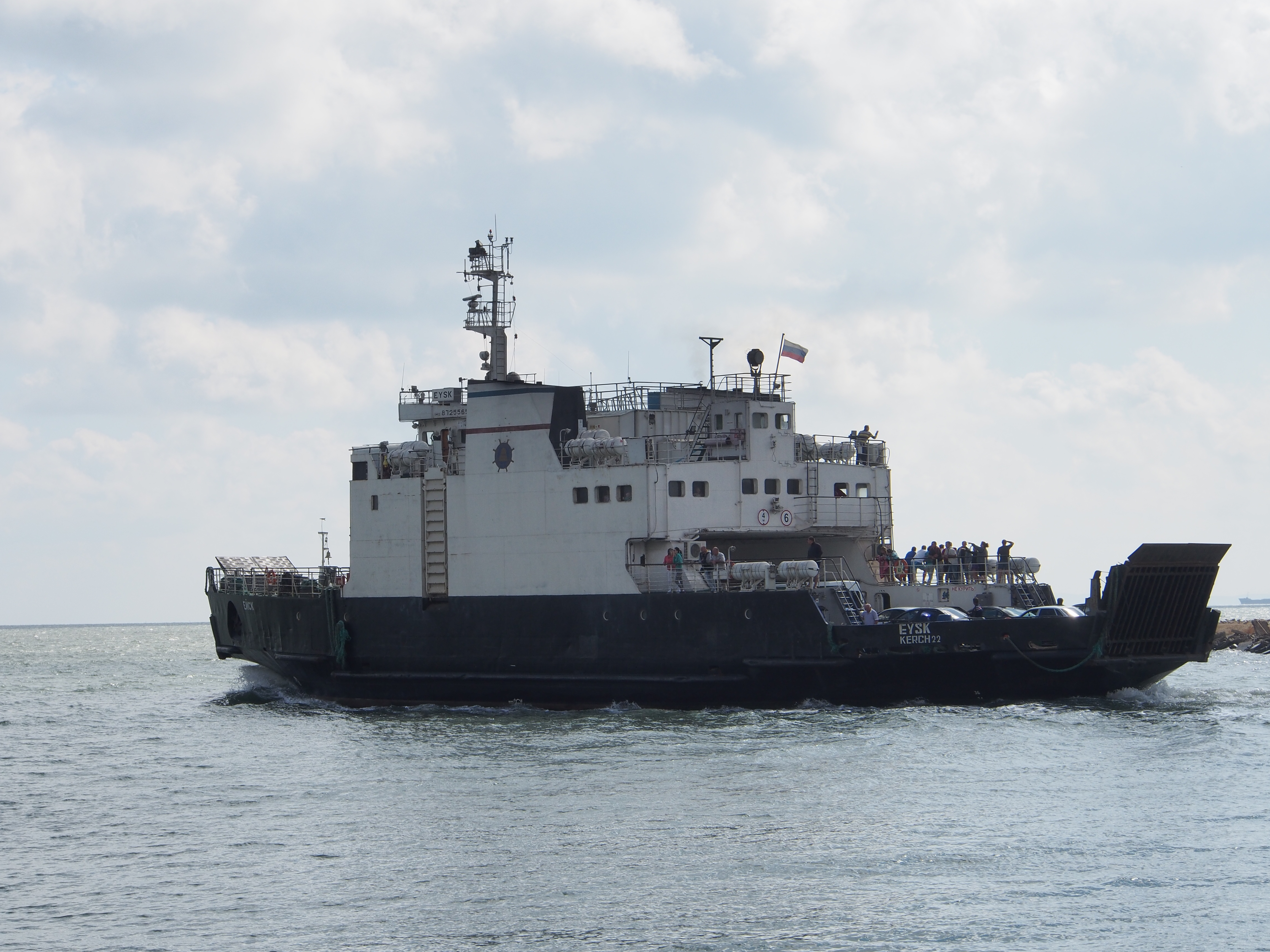
Yeysk road ferry (2014)

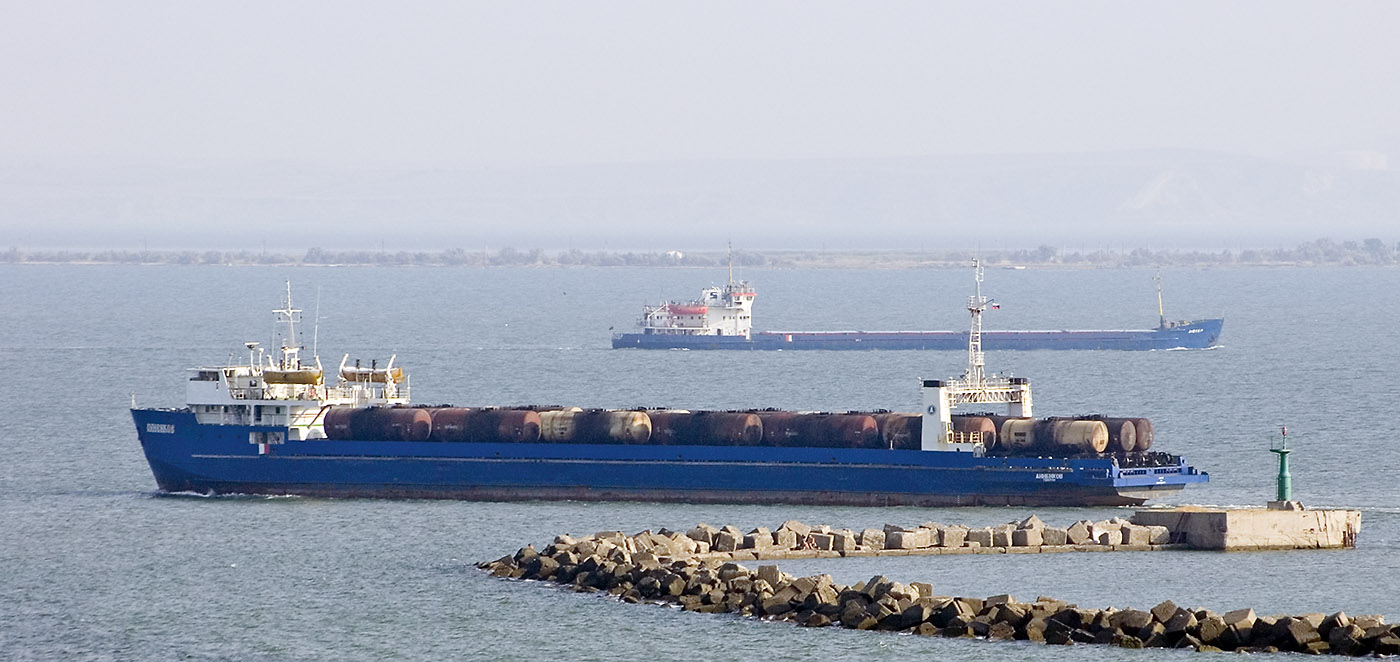
Annenkov rail ferry (sold for scrap late 2020)

== See also ==
- Kerch–Yenikale Canal
