= Temryuksky District =

Temryuksky District Темрюкский район (Russian)
- District
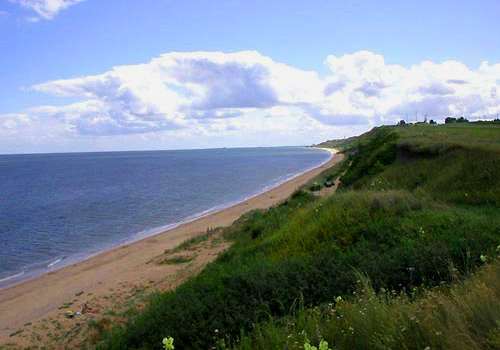
- Coastal area in Temryuksky District

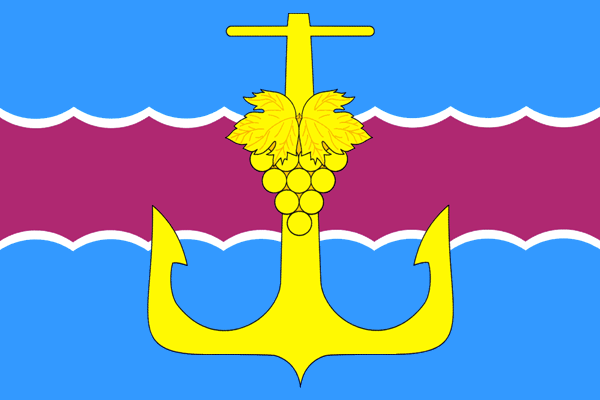
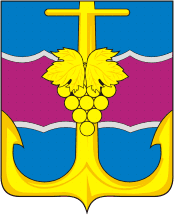
- Flag Coat of arms
- Location of Temryuksky District in Krasnodar Krai
- Coordinates: 45°16′00″N 37°23′00″E
- Country: Russia
- Federal subject: Krasnodar Krai
- Established: 1924
- Administrative center: Temryuk

Area
  - Total: 1,957 km^{2} (756 sq mi)

Population (2010 Census)
  - Total: 117,904
  - Density: 60.25/km^{2} (156.0/sq mi)
  - Urban: 32.3%
  - Rural: 67.7%

Administrative structure
  - Administrative divisions: 1 Towns, 11 Rural okrugs
  - Inhabited localities: 1 cities/towns, 38 rural localities

Municipal structure
  - Municipally incorporated as: Temryuksky Municipal District
  - Municipal divisions: 1 urban settlements, 11 rural settlements
- Time zone: UTC+3 (MSK)
- OKTMO ID: 03651000
- Website: http://www.temryuk.ru/

Temryuksky District (Russian: Темрю́кский райо́н) is an administrative district (raion), one of the thirty-eight in Krasnodar Krai, Russia. As a municipal division, it is incorporated as Temryuksky Municipal District. It is located in the west of the krai. The area of the district is 1,957 square kilometers (756 sq mi). Its administrative center is the town of Temryuk. Population: 117,904 (2010 census); 115,462 (2002 census); 105,328 (1989 Soviet census). The population of Temryuk accounts for 32.3% of the district's total population.
