= 2022 Crimean Bridge explosion =

2022 explosion on the Crimean Bridge

Coordinates: 45°18′04″N 36°30′45″E

- Part of the Crimea attacks during the Russo-Ukrainian war
- Date: 8 October 2022
- Time: 6:07 a.m. (UTC+03:00)
- Location: Crimean Bridge
- Motive: Attack on Russian logistics
- Perpetrator: Security Service of Ukraine
- Deaths: 5
- Convicted: 8

The 2022 Crimean Bridge explosion occurred on 8 October 2022, at 6:07 a.m. A fire broke out on the Crimean Bridge as a result of an explosion of a bomb that had been loaded onto a truck. The explosion occurred on the road bridge, on the westbound vehicle lanes, from Russia to Kerch in Russian-occupied Crimea. The explosion caused two two-lane vehicular spans of the bridge to collapse into the water; two adjacent eastbound lanes on a separate structure survived. The adjoining railway bridge was damaged by a railway tanker car that caught fire. Five people were killed. Following the incident, the Investigative Committee of Russia launched an investigation.

The damage caused by the explosion reduced the transport capacity of the bridge, which is being used to supply Russian troops in Crimea during the invasion of Ukraine. The explosion occurred the day after the 70th birthday of Russian President Vladimir Putin and one week after the announcement of the annexation of four Ukrainian regions by Russia.

Russian officials and a "senior Ukrainian official" speaking to The New York Times stated the explosion was from a bomb loaded onto a truck. BBC News reported that it was more likely to have been caused by a maritime drone. The Russian Federal Security Service later detained five Russian citizens and three people from Ukraine and Armenia, who were accused of organising the attack.

At the time, no-one claimed responsibility. and Ukrainian president Volodymyr Zelenskyy said that his government "did not order" it. However, in July 2023, Ukraine's Deputy Minister of Defense Hanna Maliar acknowledged Ukraine had conducted the attack "in order to break the logistics of the Russians". The Security Service of Ukraine confirmed that Ukraine was behind the attack. In August, Vasyl Malyuk, head of the Security Service of Ukraine, gave an interview to The New Voice of Ukraine in which he detailed how a truck carrying explosives was used to cause the explosion.

== Background ==
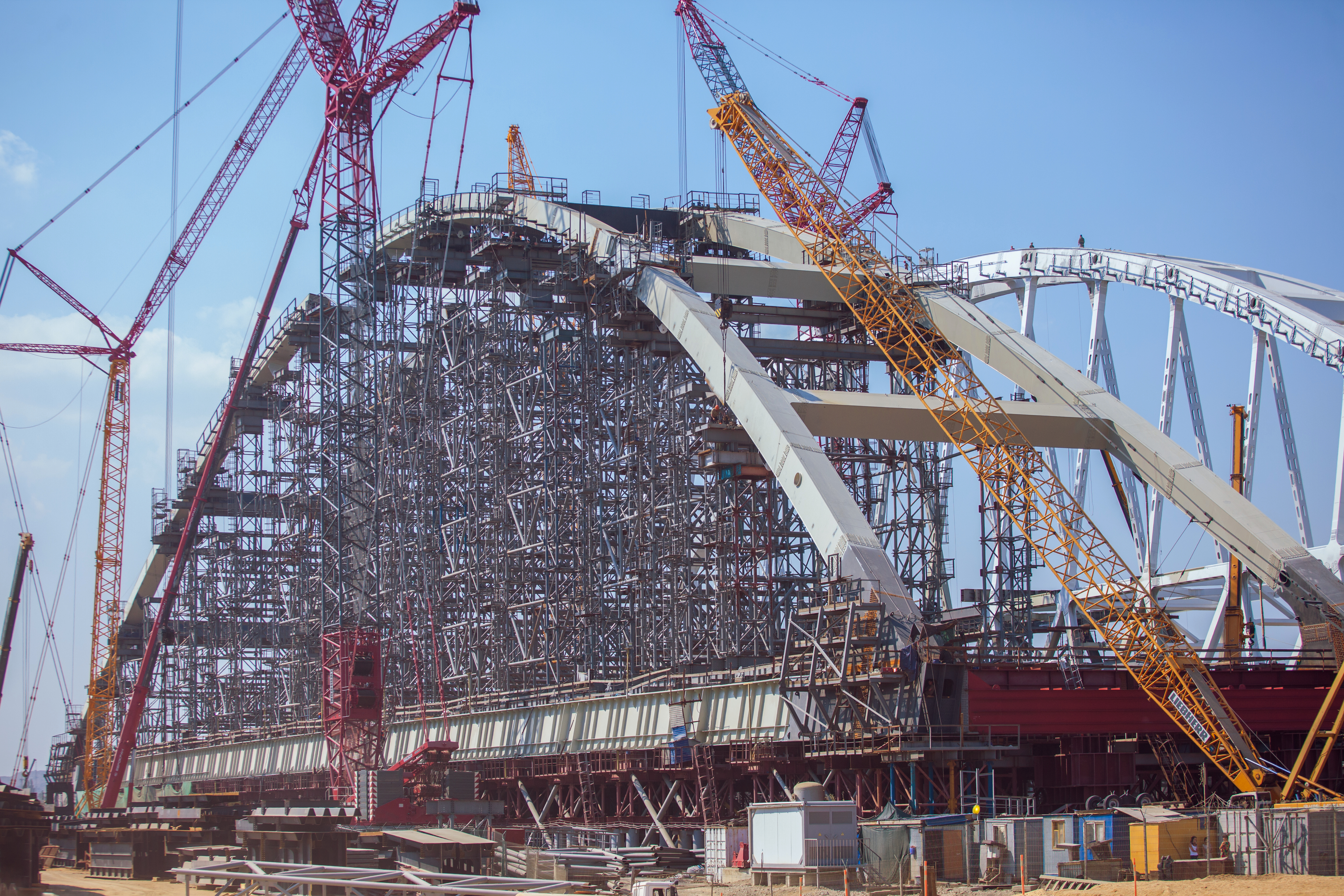
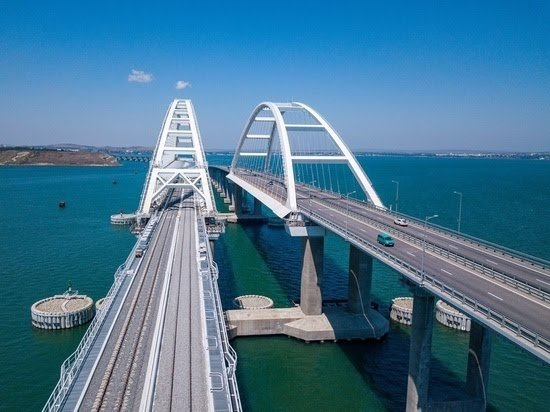
(left) Completion of the arches for the bridge prior to their transportation (right) The Crimean Bridge, photographed in August 2019.

The Crimean Bridge is a pair of parallel bridges, one carrying a four-lane road and the other a double-track railway, spanning the Kerch Strait between Russia on the east side and Crimea in Ukraine on the west side. Construction on the bridge began in February 2016, following the Russian occupation and annexation of the Crimean peninsula in 2014. The Russian authorities called the construction an "historic mission", one of the key tasks for the "final unification of Crimea with Russia". In May 2018, the road bridge was opened to traffic, and in December 2019, the rail bridge became operational.

During the 2022 Russian invasion of Ukraine, both bridges have been used to supply the Russian Armed Forces in the Southern Ukraine campaign. While other methods of supplying resources to Crimea exist, including ports, the Crimean Bridge is an important part of the infrastructure.

Ukrainian officials and military have repeatedly declared their intention to destroy the Crimean Bridge, considering it as a legitimate military target. In June 2022, Major General of the Armed Forces of Ukraine Dmytro Marchenko stated that it would become "target number one" as soon as Ukraine had weapons to attack it. In April 2022, Dmitry Medvedev, former President and Deputy Chairman of the Security Council of Russia, said: "One of the Ukrainian generals talked about the need to strike at the Crimean Bridge. I hope he understands what the retaliatory target will be." In August 2022, Ukrainian presidential advisor Mykhailo Podolyak told The Guardian: "It's an illegal construction and the main gateway to supply the Russian army in Crimea. Such objects should be destroyed."

== Explosion ==
(left) CCTV footage of the explosion on the right lane of the right carriageway. The railway runs higher on the left. (right) A satellite image of the bridge after the explosion.

On 8 October 2022 at 6:07 a.m. local time, there was an explosion on (or near) the lanes of the road bridge, heading towards the Crimean city of Kerch. The explosion occurred midway between the main arch span over the Kerch–Yenikale shipping channel and Tuzla Island. It caused three of the four spans on one side of the bridge to collapse into the water. The press service of the Crimea Railway stated that at 6:05 a.m. they detected an error on the railway bridge, and that a fuel container wagon caught fire in the tail of a freight train. Wind from north blew flames and smoke towards the Black Sea. Traffic by road, rail and sea were stopped, with long queues forming on land and sea. The explosion was not immediately reported by the Russian authorities as an act of sabotage. The road bridge was reopened to a single lane of light traffic later in the day (with traffic alternating in each direction), and some rail traffic.

Initially, two possible causes of the fire were announced — the explosion of a fuel container wagon on the railway bridge, and the explosion of an automotive vehicle, probably a truck, on the road bridge. According to the Russian National Anti-Terrorism Committee, a truck was blown up, which caused seven rail fuel containers to catch fire. No responsibility was claimed for the explosion, but the Ukrainian media Ukrainska Pravda and UNIAN, citing their own sources, stated that it was a Security Service of Ukraine operation. The New York Times described a "senior Ukrainian official" as saying that "Ukraine’s intelligence services had orchestrated the attack and that it involved a bomb loaded onto a truck that drove across the bridge". Russia claimed that a bomb exploded while being carried by a truck going full speed using an improvised explosive device. With indications that an explosion directly damaged the road bridge and that its blast caused a fire on a train on the rail bridge, the presence of many sparks could indicate the use of thermite which burns hot enough to damage steel and ignite the flammable fuel in the train.

== Immediate impact ==
Five people were killed: the truck driver and four people in a nearby car, including the driver.

Seven fuel tankers of a 59-wagon train destined for the Crimean Peninsula caught on fire from the explosion. With the closure of the bridge, it became more difficult for local residents to leave Crimea, with car queues 5 kilometres (3.1 mi) long, although other ways remained, including ports. Over 100 trucks waited on either side to use the small ferry, carrying 16 trucks at a time. Marine traffic was hindered, as dozens of ships waited on either side of the bridge.

Mikhail Razvozhayev, the mayor of Sevastopol, initially imposed restrictions on the sale of groceries and forbade the sale of fuel in canisters, but rescinded these measures for all of Crimea about an hour later, saying that supply lines were sufficient.

== Structural damage to the bridges ==
Three spans of the roadway deck on the Kerch-bound side were damaged with two collapsed into the water. In videos and satellite imagery, there was discolouration of girders of the rail bridge. Two experts on bridge safety and blast engineering consider it likely that the fuel fire weakened the girders that support the rail bridge. The rail bridge supports a double-track railway, and Russia restarted traffic on the unaffected rail track almost immediately. The Russian Ministry of Transport reported that on the following day all rail freight and long-distance passenger trains were running to schedule.

A full repair of the bridge was ordered, to be completed by 1 July 2023. The contract was awarded to the Moscow-based construction company Nizhneangarsktransstroy. On 9 November 2022, the UK Ministry of Defence released an intelligence update, saying: "Russian efforts to repair the Crimean bridge continue but it is unlikely to be fully operational until at least September 2023." The road bridge was closed on 8 November 2022 to allow the movement and installation of a replacement 64-metre (210 ft) space. The Guardian reported that "Although Crimean officials have claimed [three] additional spans will be in place by 20 December, a briefing provided to President Putin added that works to the other carriageway would cause disruption to road traffic until March 2023."

== Reaction ==
=== Russian ===
The Russian authorities in Crimea blamed Ukraine for the attack. A Ministry of Foreign Affairs of the Russian Federation spokeswoman accused the "Kyiv regime" of terrorism, and a deputy of the State Duma, Andrey Gurulyov (United Russia), called for a strong response. Sergey Aksyonov, the Russian appointed head of Crimea, expressed a desire for revenge, and spoke of about the food and fuel, noting that "the situation is manageable—it's unpleasant, but not fatal".

On 9 October, Putin stated: "There is no doubt. This is an act of terrorism aimed at destroying critically important civilian infrastructure [...]. This was devised, carried out and ordered by the Ukrainian special services." Kremlin propagandist Vladimir Solovyov urged retaliatory strikes across all Ukraine targeting "bridges, dams, railways, thermal power plants and other infrastructure facilities".

=== Ukrainian ===
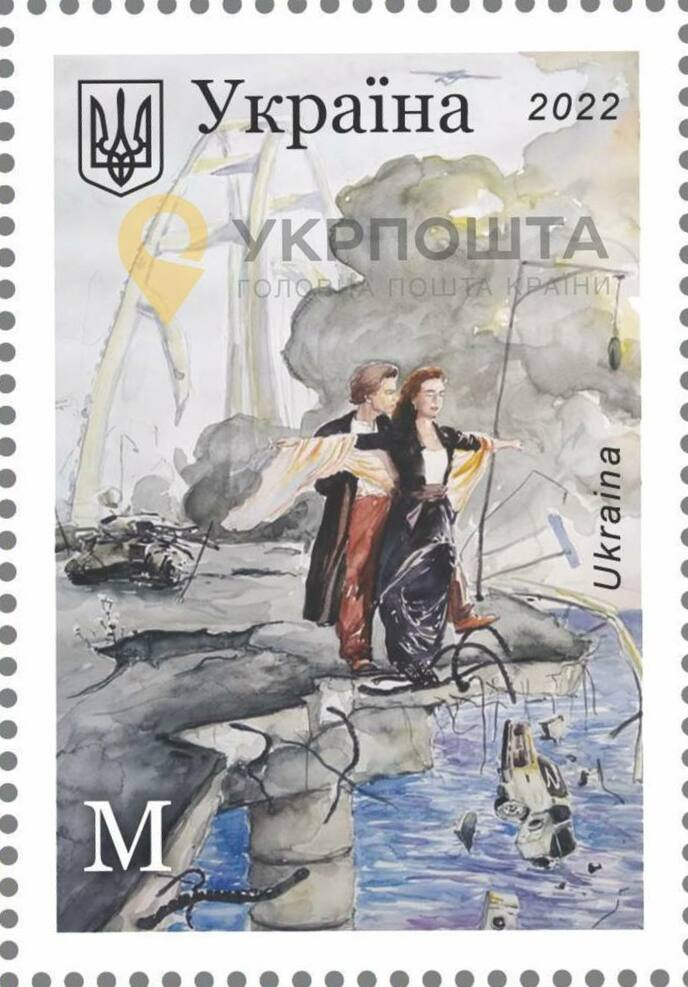
A Ukrainian postage stamp issued in October 2022 ("Crimean bridge again!")

The Ukrainian government's official Twitter account tweeted "sick burn" in response to the fire, while Mykhailo Podolyak, a Ukrainian presidential advisor, stated that the attack on the bridge was a precursor to the defeat of Russia in the war: "Crimea, a bridge, the beginning. Everything illegal must be destroyed, everything stolen must be returned to Ukraine [...]." The Ministry of Defense of Ukraine compared the attack to the sinking of the cruiser Moskva, writing: "The guided missile cruiser Moskva and the Kerch Bridge — two notorious symbols of Russian power in Ukrainian Crimea — have gone down. What's next in line, Russkies?".

Ihor Smilianskyi, the director of the national postal service of Ukraine, announced the release of a new postage stamp set dedicated to the event. Oleksiy Danilov, head of the National Security and Defence Council, posted a video of the bridge on social media, along with a 1962 video of Marilyn Monroe singing "Happy Birthday, Mr. President" to US President John F. Kennedy. The explosion occurred a day after the 70th birthday of Russian President Vladimir Putin.

Ukrainian President Volodymyr Zelenskyy said during his nightly address: "Today was not a bad day and mostly sunny on our state's territory. Unfortunately, it was cloudy in Crimea. Although it was also warm."

=== International ===
The foreign minister of Estonia, Urmas Reinsalu, welcomed the explosion and suggested that Ukrainian special forces were behind it, recalling that the Ukrainian authorities had long called the Crimean Bridge a possible target for a strike.

A Polish member of the European Parliament, Robert Biedroń (New Left) described the attack as "a balm for the heart, especially since yesterday was Putin's birthday. It's good that Putin received such a gift. I hope he gets more. Ukrainians are destroying Russia's illegal infrastructure [in the occupied Crimea]."

== Aftermath ==
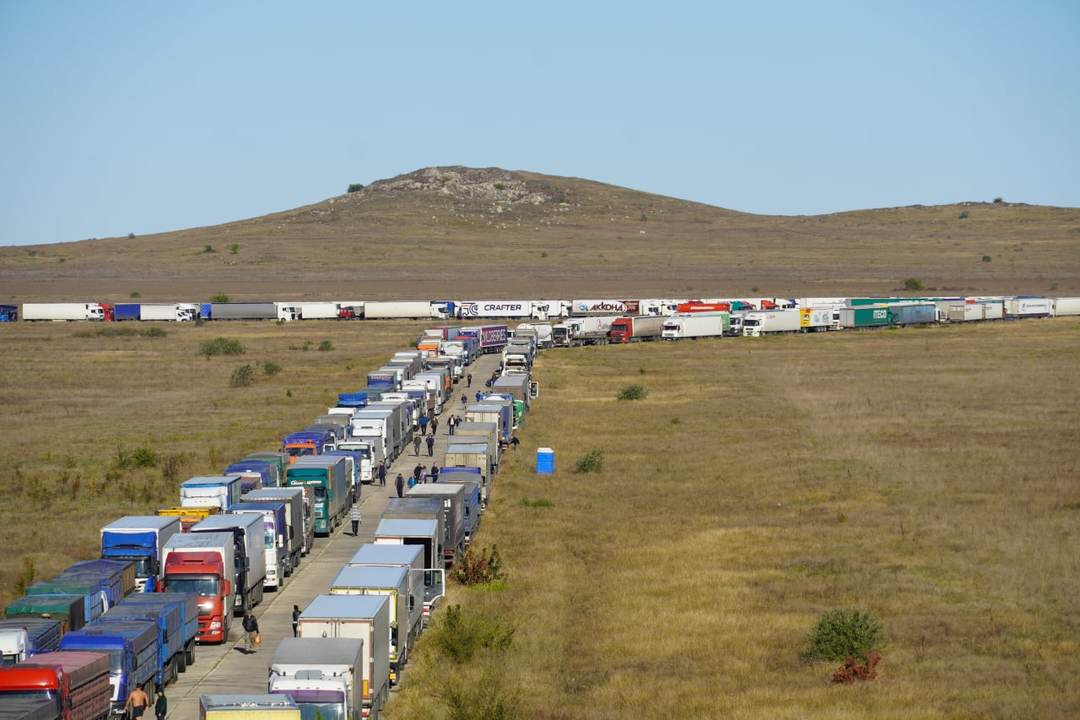
A queue of trucks near the Kerch Strait following the explosion, October 2022

The Ministry of Transport of Russia announced that the ferry service across the Kerch Strait, which operated before the construction of the Crimean bridge, was being re-launched.

The Crimean Bridge is an important part of the transport connection between Russia and Crimea for the southern theater of operations of the Russo-Ukrainian War. The New York Times reported that the damage would create temporary logistical hurdles for Russian military movements, but heavy military equipment could be transported by the railway bridge.

On 8 October, the Russian foreign ministry published a video showing that the bridge was partially reopened to light vehicles. Trucks had to take the ferry, while trains had resumed, according to Russian state media. A week later, hundreds of trucks were waiting three to four days to use the ferry.

Putin ordered the security of the bridge to be placed under the control of Russia's Federal Security Service (FSB). The Deputy Prime Minister of Russia Marat Khusnullin said that the damaged portions of the bridge would be taken down and repairs were to commence immediately. On 9 October divers inspected the bridge structure for any underwater damage. The Russian government ordered the repairs to be completed by July 2023.

The road bridge was fully re-opened on 23 February 2023, according to an announcement from Khusnullin. On 5 May the deputy prime minister also announced that the rail bridge had been fully reopened.

=== Effect on Russian forces ===
Russian forces have had their logistics hindered by the blast on the bridge. The UK Ministry of Defence noted that transport "capacity [would] be seriously degraded" over the bridge. Repairs started on the evening of 8 October, with car and rail traffic resuming almost immediately. Trucks used ferries because one section of their lane was completely destroyed. The Russian reliance on rail to move military equipment means that truck traffic is not the major concern. There is also a land corridor along the coast of southern Ukraine, although this is at higher risk of attack. Construction of the bridge was completed in 2018, so it has only been relied upon for a few years. The greatest blow might be psychological, according to people comparing it to the sinking of the Russian cruiser Moskva and considering Putin's personal links to the bridge. Various analysts said on 10 October that trains would likely cross the bridge at reduced speed and loads.

=== Effect on Russian government ===
The symbolic nature of the destruction was significant. The opening of the bridge in 2018 was considered one of Putin's greatest propaganda achievements. After the Russian invasion of 2022, the structure was one of the most protected objects. A week before the explosion, a decree was signed on the annexation of four Ukrainian regions by Russia, after which Russia continued to threaten Ukraine with nuclear weapons in the event of an attack on objects in the annexed territories.

Putin said that the October 2022 missile strikes on Ukraine, which hit civilian areas in Kyiv and other cities, were in retaliation for Ukraine's alleged attack on the Crimean Bridge.

In May 2023, former history teacher Nikita Tushkanov was sentenced to five-and-a-half years in prison under Russian 2022 war censorship laws on charges of "justifying terrorism" and "discrediting" the Russian military for calling the Crimean Bridge explosion "a birthday gift for Putler."

== Investigation ==
Putin ordered the circumstances surrounding the explosion to be investigated. A commission was created that included representatives of the Ministry of Emergency Situations, the Ministry of Transport, the FSB, the Ministry of Internal Affairs and the National Guard. The Investigative Committee opened a criminal investigation into the explosion. Representatives of the special services drew attention to the shift that failed to detect the truck loaded with explosives, despite the procedures at the entrance to the bridge designed to watch for suspicious cargo.

The National Anti-Terrorism Committee of Russia reported:

At 06:07 Moscow time today [03:07 GMT], an explosion was set off at a cargo vehicle on the motorway part of the Crimean bridge on the side of the Taman peninsula, which set fire to seven fuel tanks of a train that was en route to the Crimean peninsula. Two motorway sections of the bridge partially collapsed.

On 10 October, the Russian chief investigator, Alexander Bastrykin, reported that the route of the truck had been established. The following day, the FSB revealed that five Russians and three people from Ukraine and/or Armenia had been detained. A Ukrainian citizen involved in planning another bombing in Bryansk was, according to the FSB, "cooperating with the investigation". The explosives (22,770 kilograms (50,200 lb)) were transported on 22 pallets on the truck. The explosives were loaded at Odesa at the beginning of August and shipped through Bulgaria, Armenia and Georgia to Russia. On 7 October, it was loaded onto a Russian truck bound for Simferopol. FSB released an X-ray video showing what they said was the truck loaded with explosives. In contrast with the photos from the bridge checkpoint released earlier, the X-rayed truck was missing a spare wheel and one of the axles.

It is assumed that the truck driver was used "blindly" and was unaware of the impending explosion. According to a statement by Vasyl Malyuk, head of the Security Service of Ukraine, the 22 people detained by Russian law enforcement on charges of involvement in organizing the explosion were not aware of the plan to carry it out.

On 21 April 2023, the Lefortovo District court in Moscow issued an arrest warrant against Kyrylo Budanov, head of Ukrainian Intelligence, in relation to the October 2022 bridge explosion. Budanov responded to the warrant, stating, "I am pleased. This is a good indicator of our work, and I promise to work even better."

On 27 November 2025, the Southern District Military Court in Rostov-on-Don sentenced eight people to life imprisonment on charges of carrying out the bombing.

== See also ==
- Bridges in the Russo-Ukrainian War
- Attacks in Russia during the Russian invasion of Ukraine
- Russian strikes against Ukrainian infrastructure (2022–present)
- Antonivka Road Bridge
- Kerch Strait incident
- Destruction of the Kakhovka Dam
