= Crimean Bridge =

Bridge across the Kerch Strait

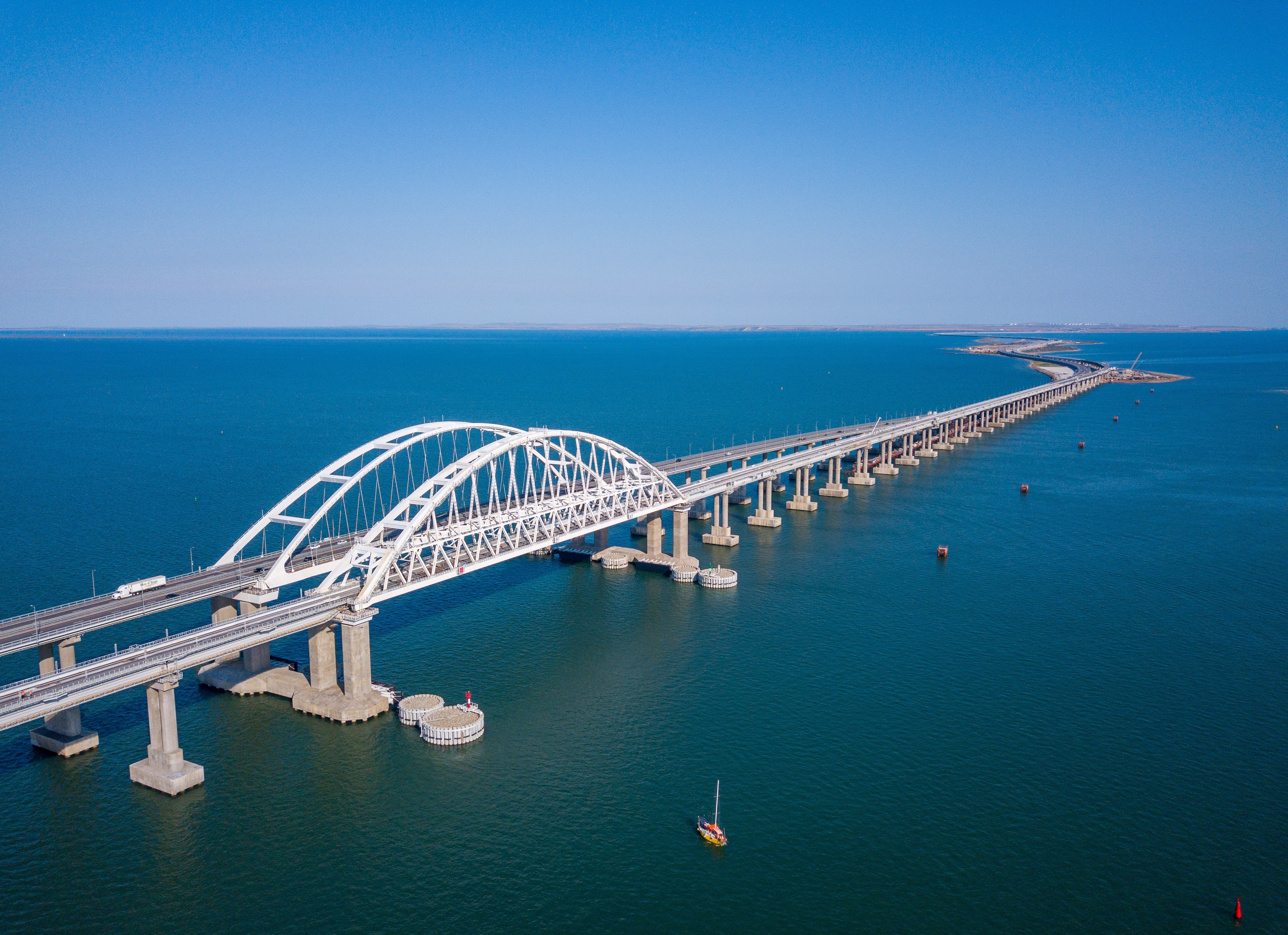
- The Crimean Bridge in 2019, before the 2026 destruction of the road bridge main span
- Coordinates: 45°18′31″N 36°30′22″E
- Carries: A 290 ( E97); Bagerovo–Vyshestebliyevskaya railway
- Crosses: Kerch Strait: (Kerch–Yenikale Canal, Tuzla Island, Tuzla Spit remains)
- Locale: Kerch, Crimea and Taman, Russia
- Official name: Крымский мост
- Owner: Government of Russia

Characteristics
- Design: Double parallel railroad-road box girder bridge with tied-arch spans across both the railroad and road parts
- Total length: Railroad bridge: 18.1 km (11 1/4 mi); Road bridge: 16.9 km (10 1/2 mi)
- Water depth: Up to 9 m (30 ft)
- Longest span: 227 metres (745 ft)
- Clearance below: 35 metres (115 ft)
- No. of lanes: 4

Rail characteristics
- No. of tracks: 2
- Track gauge: Russian gauge

History
- Designer: Institute Giprostroymost – Saint Petersburg
- Constructed by: Stroygazmontazh, other Russian, Dutch, and German firms
- Construction start: February 2016 (Note: Preliminary work started in May 2015, and the main construction (of the link itself) started in February 2016. See further.)
- Construction end: April 2018 (road bridge); December 2019 (rail bridge)
- Construction cost: ₽227.92 billion)(€3.23 billion) (US$3.7 billion)
- Opened: 2018; 8 years ago (road bridge) (Note: Opened on 16 May 2018 for non-truck traffic and on 1 October for goods vehicles); 2019–2020; 6 years ago (rail bridge) (Note: Opened on 25 December 2019 for passenger traffic and on 30 June 2020 for freight trains)
- Inaugurated: 15 May 2018; 8 years ago (road bridge); 23 December 2019; 6 years ago (rail bridge)
- Replaces: Kerch railway bridge; Kerch Strait ferry line

Statistics
- Daily traffic: 15,000 cars
- Toll: None

The Crimean Bridge, (Note: Russian: Крымский мост, romanised: Krymskiy most, IPA: [ˈkrɨmskʲij most]; Ukrainian: Кримський міст, romanised: Krymskyi mist) also called Kerch Strait Bridge or Kerch Bridge, is a double road and rail bridge spanning the Kerch Strait between the Taman Peninsula of Krasnodar Krai in Russia and the Kerch Peninsula of Crimea. It consists of a four-lane road bridge, whose main span was destroyed in 2026 by a Ukrainian attack, and a double-track railway bridge. Built by Russia after its 2014 annexation of Crimea, the bridge cost ₽227.92 billion (€3.23 billion) and has a length of 19 km (12 mi), (Note: Entire fixed link, including small causeways at the ends. The bridges themselves are 18.1 km (11 1/4 mi) (rail) and about 17 km (10 1/2 mi) (road) long.) making it the longest bridge in Europe and the longest bridge constructed by Russia. (Note: It is also often considered to be the longest bridge in Russia, but this applies only to de facto Russian territory, including Crimea, since most of the bridge is in the (Autonomous) Republic of Crimea. The Taman–Tuzla Spit part, in undisputed Russian territory, is only 4.5 kilometres (2 3/4 mi) long, shorter than the President Bridge in Ulyanovsk Oblast (5.825 km or 3 mi 1,090 yd).)

In January 2015 the multibillion-dollar construction contract for the bridge was awarded to Arkady Rotenberg's Stroygazmontazh, which built the bridge together with other Russian, Dutch, and German firms. Preliminary work started in May 2015, and construction began in February 2016. The bridge was named the Crimean Bridge after an online vote in December 2017, whilst Kerch Bridge and Reunification Bridge were the second and third most popular choices respectively. The road bridge was inaugurated by Russian president Vladimir Putin on 15 May 2018. It opened for cars on 16 May and for trucks on 1 October. The rail bridge was inaugurated on 23 December 2019 and the first scheduled passenger train crossed the bridge two days later. The bridge was opened for freight trains on 30 June 2020. A record amount of traffic, totalling 36,393 cars, was recorded on 15 August 2020.

In 2018, the United Nations General Assembly passed a resolution condemning the building of the bridge for facilitating "the further militarization of Crimea". During the Russo-Ukrainian war, the bridge was attacked by Ukraine several times, in 2022, 2023, and 2025; a series of attacks in November 2026 destroyed the arched span of the road bridge.

== History ==
=== Pre-annexation proposals and attempts ===
==== Kerch railway bridge ====
Proposals to build a bridge across the Kerch Strait had been considered since the early 20th century.

During World War II the German Organisation Todt built a ropeway over the strait. Finished in June 1943, it had daily capacity of 1,000 tonnes. Construction of a combined road and railway bridge started in April 1943, but before it was finished, retreating German troops blew up the completed parts of the bridge and destroyed the ropeway.

In late 1944–early 1945, the Soviet Union constructed a 4.5-kilometre (2 3/4 mi) railway bridge across the strait. This bridge, not designed as permanent, was marred by design and construction errors, and was destroyed by flowing ice in February 1945. A proposal to repair it was quickly dismissed and the remnants of the bridge were dismantled, with permanent bridge designs envisaged instead.

==== Soviet proposals ====
In 1949 the Soviet government ordered the construction of a 5.969-kilometre (3 mi 1,248 yd) two-tier combined road-rail bridge (two road lanes on the upper tier and two rail tracks on the lower tier) with 40 m clearance below, connecting Yeni-Kale with Chushka Spit, but in 1950 construction was halted and a ferry line was set up instead.

A different version of the fixed link, the Kerch waterworks project (Керченский гидроузел) was developed from the mid-1960s, proposing a system of dams and bridges across the strait. The project was not implemented due to a lack of funding and the later collapse of the Soviet Union.

==== Negotiations between the Ukrainian and Russian governments ====
Although the idea of an international bridge linking Ukraine and Russia survived the 1991 dissolution of the Soviet Union, the two countries failed to finalise the project. Former Moscow mayor Yury Luzhkov was a vocal advocate for a highway bridge across the strait, expressing hope that it would bring the Crimean people closer to Russia, both economically and symbolically. Similar hopes were expressed by pro-Russian authorities in Crimea, who hoped that the bridge would contribute to either a "revival of the Silk Road" or to a multinational road along the Black Sea coast. (Note: After the 2014 annexation of Crimea, Russia continued to support the inclusion of the peninsula into that proposed road, claiming that such an option would be economically more feasible, but Ukraine, previously supportive of the project, now stridently opposed it.)

Construction of the bridge was reconsidered by the Cabinet of Ministers of Ukraine in 2006, and the Transport Minister of Ukraine Mykola Rudkovsky stated that he expected the bridge to be a "net positive for Crimea" as it would allow "every tourist visiting Russian Caucasus to visit Crimea as well". The issue was discussed by prime ministers of both countries in 2008, and a Transport Strategy of Russia, adopted in that year, envisaged the construction of the Kerch Strait bridge as a high priority issue for the development of the Southern Federal District's transport infrastructure in the period 2016–2030, with the design ready by 2015.

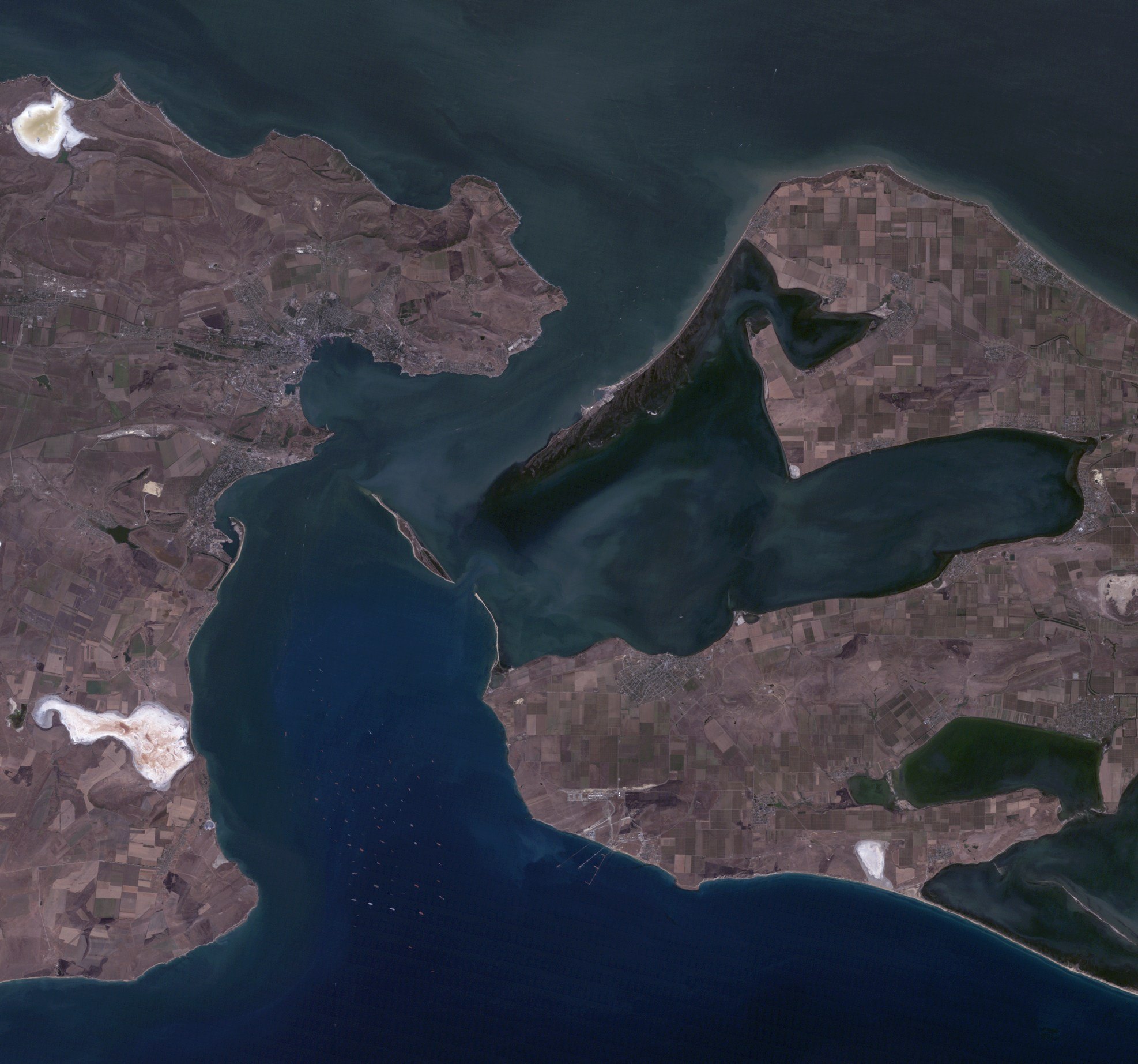
Possible alignments of the proposed bridge as of 2002. ("Tuzla" or "Southern") ultimately became the basis for the Crimean Bridge built by Russia (Cape Fonar – Cape Maly Kut, also known as "Northern route") was preliminarily preferred by the Ukrainian government in 2011.

In 2010, Ukrainian president Viktor Yanukovych and Russian president Dmitry Medvedev signed the Kharkiv Pact, an agreement to build a bridge across the Kerch Strait, and Russia and Ukraine signed a memorandum of understanding on the construction of the bridge on 26 November 2010. A 2011 study by the Ukrainian government announced preliminary preference for a route between Cape Fonar and Cape Maly Kut. Had that project been carried out, it would have meant construction of a 10.92 km (6 mi 1,382 yd) bridge link, with 49 km (30 1/2 mi) of adjacent roads and 24 km (15 mi) of adjacent railroads.

The shelving of the Ukraine–European Union Association Agreement in November 2013 led to increased interest in the construction of a bridge between Crimea and the Taman Peninsula of Russia, and an agreement on the construction of that bridge was signed as a part of the 17 December 2013 Ukrainian–Russian action plan. In late January 2014, the Ukrainian and Russian governments decided that a new joint Ukrainian–Russian company would be commissioned to handle the construction of the bridge, while the Russian state enterprise Russian Highways (commonly known as Avtodor) would become responsible for the bridge in the long term.

It was decided a special working group would determine the location and set the technical parameters. The Ministry of Economic Development and Trade of Ukraine estimated that construction would take five years and cost between €1.3 and €2.7 billion. In early February 2014, Avtodor was instructed by the First Deputy Prime Minister of Russia to work on a feasibility study to be published in 2015.

In the following months, as relations between Ukraine and Russia deteriorated, bilateral negotiations over the bridge collapsed, yet Russia claimed that it expected the December 2013 deals to be honoured, and on 3 March prime minister Dmitry Medvedev signed a governmental decree to create a subsidiary of Avtodor to oversee the project. A contest for the engineering survey of the bridge project was announced by that subsidiary on 18 March, but by that time the premise of the contest, which still referred to 2013 agreements, was already outdated. In April 2014, following the Russian annexation of Crimea the Ukrainian government gave Russia six months' notice of its withdrawal from the now-defunct bilateral Kerch Bridge agreement.

=== After 2014 annexation and start of construction ===
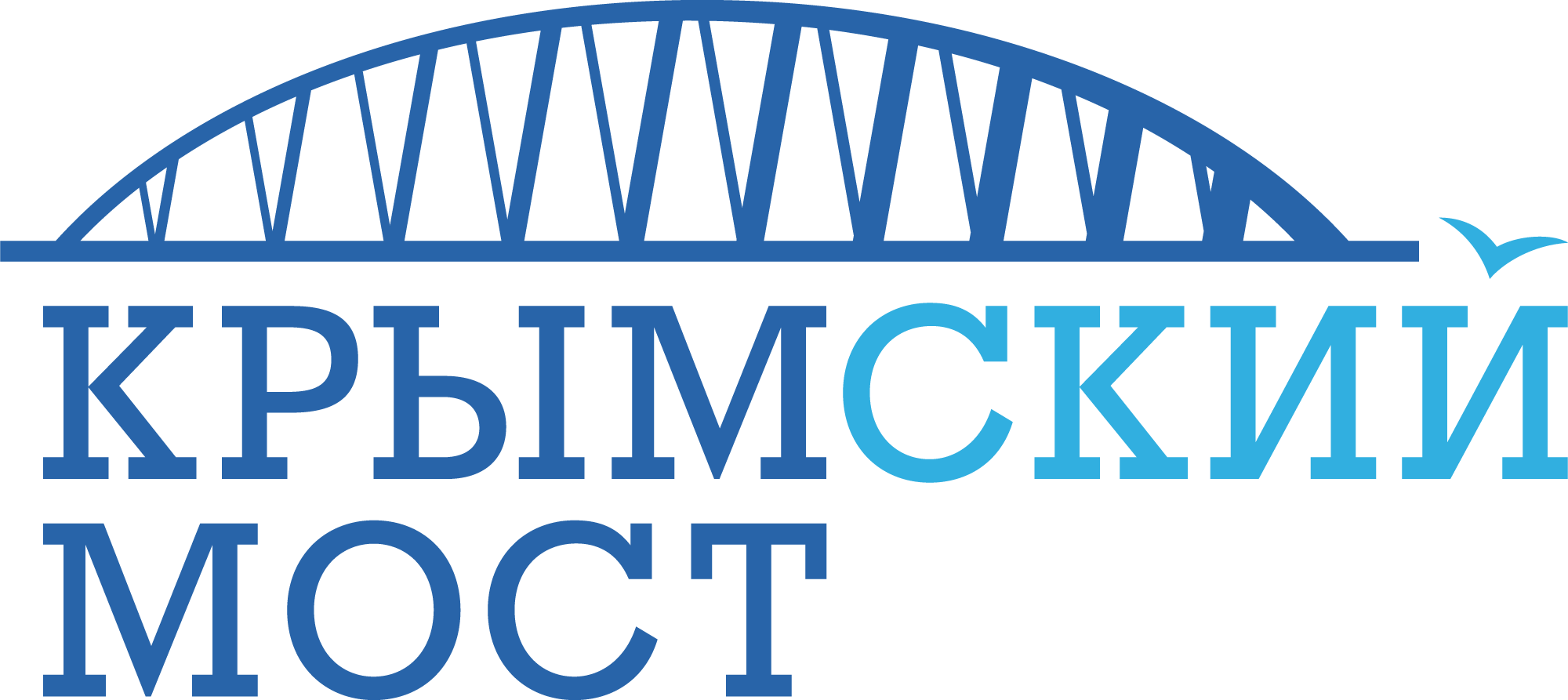
The logo of the Crimean bridge

Aerial views of the Crimean Bridge in 2021.

Following the Russian annexation of Crimea in March 2014 amid a sharp deterioration in Ukrainian-Russian relations, Russia declared it would unilaterally build the Kerch Strait bridge to connect the Russian mainland with the annexed Ukrainian peninsula. The project was strategic, an instrumental part of Russian plans to integrate the newly annexed territory into Russia. The project aimed to shift Crimean dependence on Ukraine and reduce Kyiv's leverage, remove Moscow's reliance upon inadequate sea and air links for supplying the peninsula, and allow Russia to independently supply Crimea, whose economy has become dependent upon significant subsidies from Moscow. The bridge has a symbolic purpose: it is meant to show Russia's resolve to hold Crimea, and as a "physical" attachment of Crimea to Russian territory.

The announcement that Russia would build a road-rail bridge over the strait was made by the Russian president Vladimir Putin on 19 March 2014, just one day after Russia formally claimed Crimea. In January 2015, the contract for construction of the bridge was awarded to the SGM Group, whose owner Arkady Rotenberg (reportedly a close personal friend of Putin) was internationally sanctioned in response to the Russian military's involvement in Ukraine. SGM typically constructed pipelines and had no experience building bridges, according to BBC News.

The construction of the Kerch Bridge took place without Ukraine's consent. The Ukrainian government has actively condemned Russian construction of the bridge as illegal because Ukraine, "as a coastal state with regard to the Crimean Peninsula", did not give its consent to such construction, and called on Russia to demolish "those parts of that structure located within temporarily occupied Ukrainian territory". Sanctions were introduced by the United States and the European Union against companies involved in the construction.

Since December 2018 the United Nations General Assembly has repeatedly condemned the construction and opening of the bridge as "facilitating the further militarisation of Crimea" and "restricting the size of ships that can reach the Ukrainian ports on the Azov coast". Russia, on the other hand, asserted that it "shall not ask for anybody's permission to build transport infrastructure for the sake of the population of Russian regions".

=== Attacks since the Russian invasion of Ukraine ===
Following the Russian invasion of Ukraine in February 2022, Ukraine planned and threatened to destroy the bridge, In June 2022, Dmitry Peskov, the Kremlin Press Secretary, guaranteed that the bridge was secure.

During the war there were two large explosions, in October 2022 and July 2023, on the bridge. According to the BBC a source in Ukraine's security service said that the 2023 explosion was caused by a Ukrainian attack with unmanned surface vessels (aquatic drones). Russia attributed the attacks to "Ukrainian terrorism". A Ukrainian defence official also said that Ukraine had carried out the October 2022 attack; the BBC was unable to verify the claims independently.

In a speech to the Aspen Security Forum in July 2023, Ukrainian president Volodymyr Zelenskyy called the bridge a legitimate military target for Ukraine that must be "neutralised" for "feeding the war with ammunition" and "militarising the Crimean Peninsula." As of May 2024, it had not been used for military transport for at least three months according to Molfar.

==== October 2022 explosion ====
On 8 October 2022 a major explosion occurred on the bridge, causing portions of the Crimea-bound road segment to collapse and causing several oil tanker wagons on the rail section to catch fire. Vladimir Konstantinov, Chairman of the State Council of Crimea, attributed the explosion to a Ukrainian attack. Limited traffic resumed on the remaining lines shortly afterwards.

On 6 January 2023, TASS reported that the first two spans of the left side of the Crimean Bridge's automobile part leading from the peninsula would be installed that month, with two more to be installed in February, the Federal Road Agency (Rosavtodor) said in a message.

The road bridge was fully opened again to traffic on 23 February 2023 according to an announcement from Russian Deputy Prime Minister Marat Khusnullin. On 5 May the deputy prime minister also announced that the rail bridge had been fully reopened.

==== July and August 2023 attacks ====
In the early morning of 17 July 2023 two explosions hit the Crimean Bridge. At least one section of the road bridge collapsed entirely, and rail services were stopped. Two people, a couple who were in a car on the bridge, were killed, and their child injured. Ukrainian and Russian sources indicated that the explosion was caused by a Ukrainian attack with unmanned surface vessels (aquatic drones).

On 12 August 2023, the Russian Defence Ministry said that Ukraine tried to strike the bridge with three S-200 missiles but were unsuccessful due to interception by air defences. Footage released online appeared to show the bridge covered in smoke. The bridge was temporarily closed, then both road and rail traffic resumed at a limited level.

Repairs for the damage from the July explosions finished in October 2023, and the bridge became fully open to rail and road traffic.

==== June 2025 explosion ====
In the early morning on 3 June 2025, the Security Service of Ukraine detonated underwater explosives near the pillars supporting the bridge. The bridge was temporarily closed, but reopened shortly after, and by evening traffic returned to normal.

==== November 2026 attacks: arched span destruction ====
Crimean Bridge following the November 2026 destruction of the road bridge arch and road span.

On 16 November 2026, Ukrainian drones struck the Crimean Bridge at 5:38 EET, shifting one of its two structural arches, forcing the partial closure of road traffic over the bridge. In the early hours of 17 November, the bridge was struck again, collapsing the arch structure supporting the main span of the road bridge as well as the road span itself. A variety of drones and missiles were used for the operation including Dovbush, Vendeta, Da Vinci, Sichen, MICH 2000, Ruta, Palyanytsia, An-197, FP-1, FP-5 Flamingo and R-360 Neptune. During the attack, LORD/Da Vinci UAV systems provided by Destinus were used to suppress Russian air defences, allowing missiles and UAVs to strike the bridge.

== Design ==
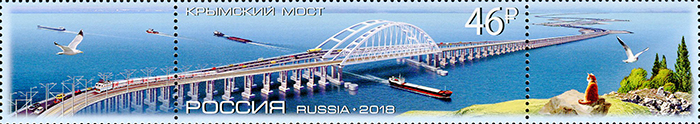
Crimean Bridge on a 2018 Russian postage stamp

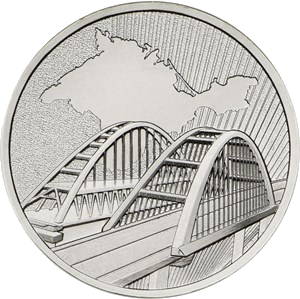
Crimean Bridge on a 2019 5-rouble coin

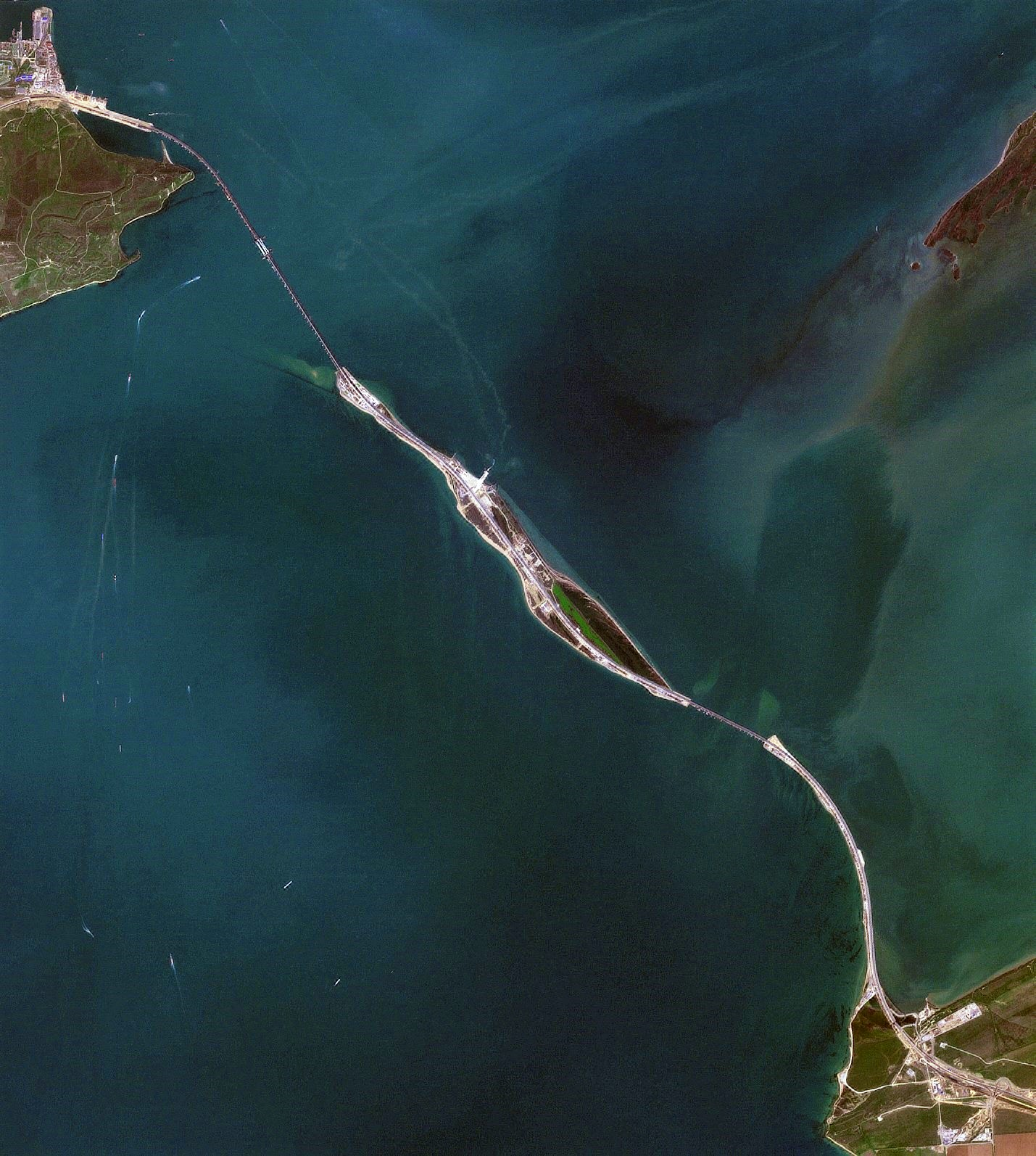
The bridge in April 2018, with Tuzla Island at centre

After the annexation, Russian officials looked at various options for connecting Crimea to the Russian mainland, including a tunnel, but eventually settled on a bridge.

The bridge spans the Strait of Kerch between the Taman Peninsula of Krasnodar Krai and the Kerch Peninsula of Crimea. (Note: Russian-annexed, mostly internationally recognised as part of Ukraine.)

The Russian government's draft resolution of 1 September 2014 required the bridge to have four lanes of vehicle traffic and a double-track railway.

An official video from October 2015 contained a CGI concept of the bridge design, annotated with various measurements. It showed a four-lane, flat deck highway bridge running parallel with the separate two-track railway. The main span over the Kerch Strait shipping channel would have a steel arch support, 227 m (745 ft) wide with a 35 m (115 ft) clearance above the water to allow ships to pass under. There would be three segments: from the Taman Peninsula to Tuzla Spit is 7 km (4 mi); across Tuzla Island is 6.5 km (4 mi); and from Tuzla Island to the Crimean Peninsula is 5.5 km (3 1/2 mi) (19 km or 12 mi total).

The final concept was a major change from the initial project considered in late 2014, which had envisaged construction of two bridge links (parallel road and rail bridges between the Taman Peninsula and the Tuzla Spit and a double deck road-rail bridge between Tuzla Island and the Kerch Peninsula) and a causeway on Tuzla Spit. This design was scrapped, the causeway being deemed too risky to rely on given the instability of the Tuzla Spit.

The official reason for abandonment of a double deck bridge in favor of two continuous parallel structures was that the latter solution allows for less massive spans and for simultaneous construction of both bridges (rather than having to construct one level of bridge first before starting the second one), an important consideration given demands by the Russian government that road and rail links be operational quickly. The "Tuzla route" was preferred over shorter variants (starting at Chushka Spit), in particular because doing otherwise would have interfered with the still operational ferry line, to the effect of worsening transport communications between Russia and Crimea.

The geology of the Kerch Strait is difficult: it has a tectonic fault, and the bedrock is covered by a 60 m (197 ft) layer of silt. About 70 mud volcanoes have been found in the area of the strait. More than 7,000 piles support the bridges; these piles have been driven up to 90 m (300 ft) beneath the water surface. Some of the piles are at an angle to make the structure more stable during earthquakes. Some experts expressed doubts that the construction was safe, given the tectonic and sea current conditions in the strait.

== Construction ==
Putin leading the first convoy across the bridge, 2018

The bridge was built by Russian, Dutch and German firms, in particular Stroygazmontazh Ltd (SGM), which had never before built a major bridge. Because of the risk of sanctions, no international insurance company was willing to underwrite the potential €2.55 billion loss. It was insured instead by a small Crimean company.

Six of the Russian firms, Mostotrest, Stroygazmontazh, Stroygazmontazh Most, VAD, GPSM, and Zaliv Shipyard, were sanctioned by the European Union (EU) in July 2018. The European Council justified the sanctions against the firms by stating that the firms had "supported the consolidation of Russia's control over the illegally annexed Crimean Peninsula". The Dutch and German participation in the construction was found to be illegal under existing international sanctions. Dutch prosecutors filed cases against seven Dutch firms, and, starting in October 2023, settled out of court with six, Dematec Equipment B.V., Bijlard Hydrauliek, Dieseko Group, CAPE Holland, Allpacks International B.V., and Allnamics Pile Testing Experts B.V., which paid modest fines. Eight individuals in the case carried out from 20 to 60 hours of community service as part of the settlement. An unnamed seventh Dutch firm was fined €120,000 in November 2024. An unnamed German firm from Schleswig-Holstein was fined €1,300,000 and its director was fined.

Preliminary work on the bridge began in May 2015. More than 200 bombs and a few aeroplanes (including an Ilyushin Il-2 and a Curtiss P-40 Kittyhawk) from the World War II era were found in the area during pre-construction clearance. Three temporary bridges were built to facilitate access (independent of weather and currents) for main construction. By October 2015, the first of the temporary bridges had been constructed, connecting Tuzla Island and Taman Peninsula.

Main construction started in February 2016. The first piles were installed in early 2016, and in April 2016 the first pillar of the road bridge was constructed. The foundations of the road bridge were completed in August 2017. The two shipping channel arches (over the Kerch–Yenikale Canal) were lifted into position in August, for the railway bridge, and October 2017.

In October 2017, National Guard of Russia Director Viktor Zolotov announced the formation of a new "maritime brigade", intended to protect the bridge as part of Russia's Southern Military District. In December 2017 all road pillars and spans were completed, by April 2018 asphalt concrete was laid onto the road bridge, and after some examination the road bridge was deemed ready for operation.

The first train travels along the new Crimean bridge railway, 2019.

On 15 May 2018, the road bridge was officially unveiled. President Vladimir Putin led a convoy of trucks, driving one himself, across the bridge in an inauguration ceremony. The bridge was opened for non-truck vehicle traffic on 16 May 2018 and for trucks on 1 October.

The construction of the rail bridge continued. In June 2018 pile installation was finished, and in July 2018 deployment of the rail tracks started.

In October 2018, the Russian Taman Road Administration reported that as one of the railway spans was being lowered into place, it tilted and fell into the sea. This occurred in the sea section between Tuzla Spit and Tuzla Island. In November 2018 the installation of the railway pillars was completed.

On 24 March 2019, the bridge's press centre reported completion of construction of railway spans, and on 18 July it reported completion of the bridge's rail tracks. In October 2019, the opening for freight trains was postponed until 2020, the official cause was a delay in the construction of the connecting railroad caused by the discovery of an ancient site on the Kerch Peninsula. Sale of train tickets across the Kerch Strait started in November 2019. On 18 December 2019 the rail bridge was deemed ready for operation, and President Putin formally opened the bridge on 23 December. The first scheduled passenger train crossed the bridge on 25 December 2019, while the bridge was opened for freight trains on 30 June 2020.

The rail bridge design provides the ability to install an overhead railway electrification system "whenever such decision will be made", requiring no rebuilding of the bridge's structures. Pending electrification, the rail bridge is served by diesel locomotives.

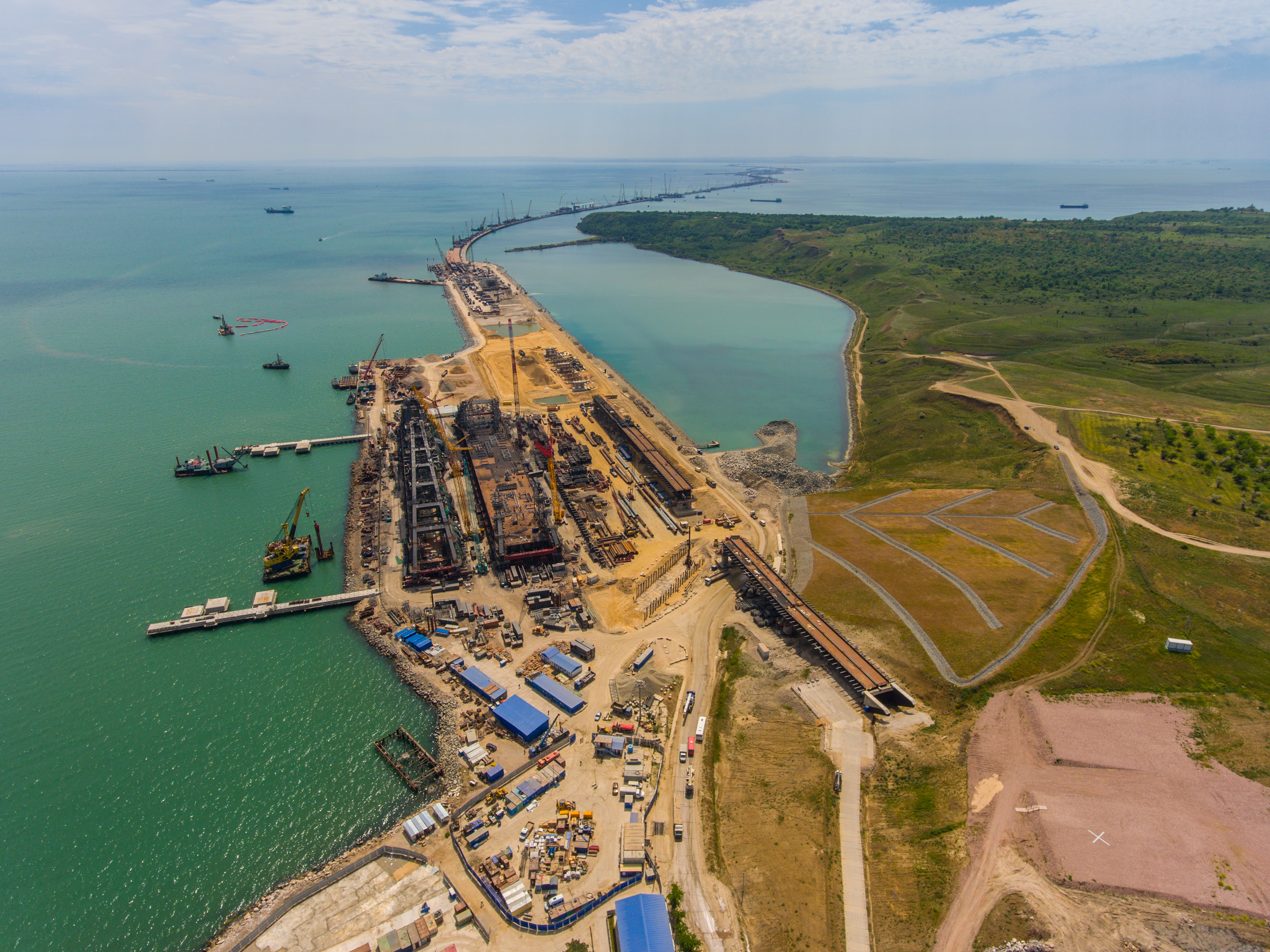
Construction of supports and installation of the first spans of the railway bridge from the side of Kerch. At the same time, the construction site is backfilled and the assembly of the bridge arches begins.

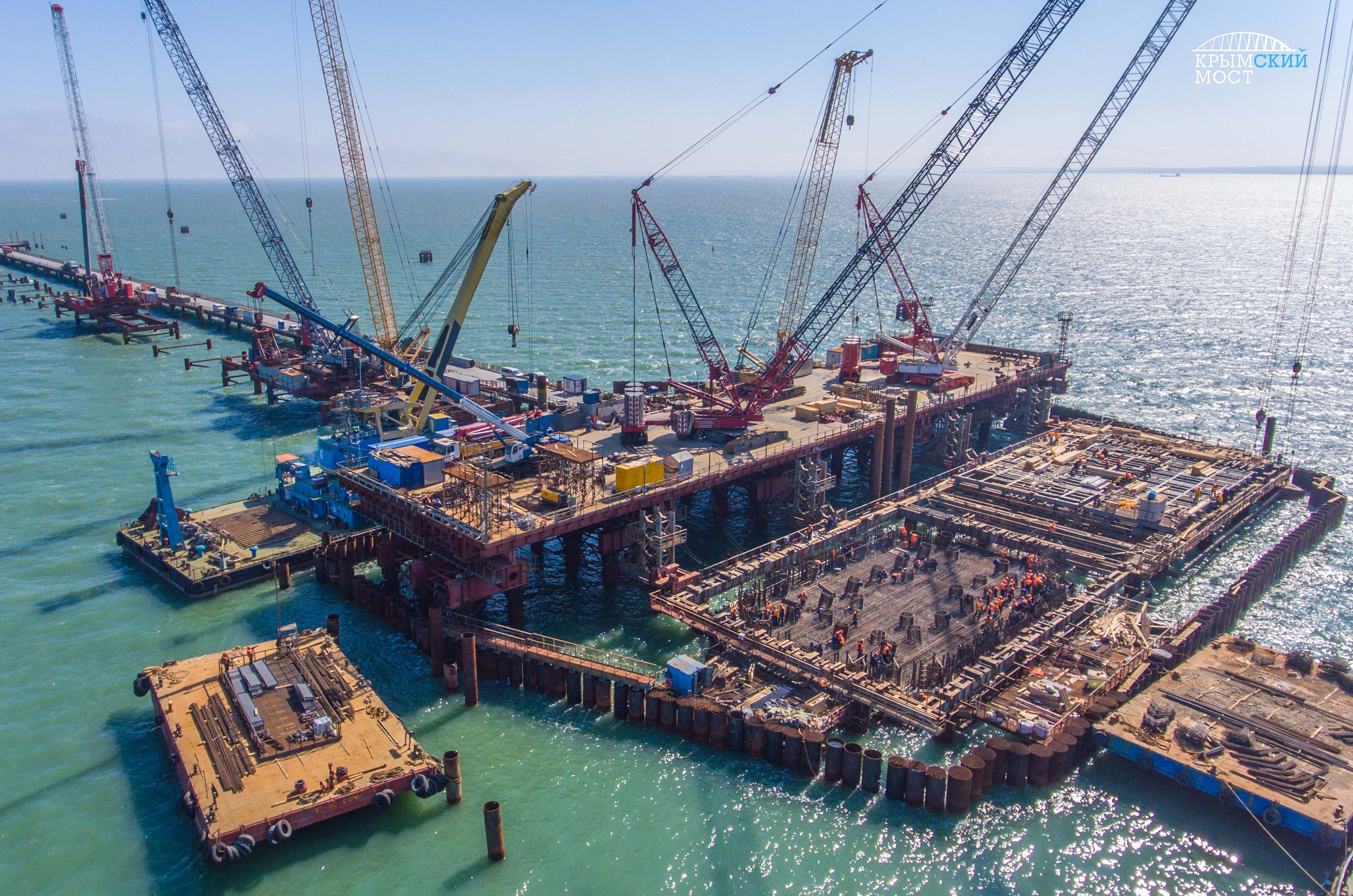
Construction of the bridge pillars

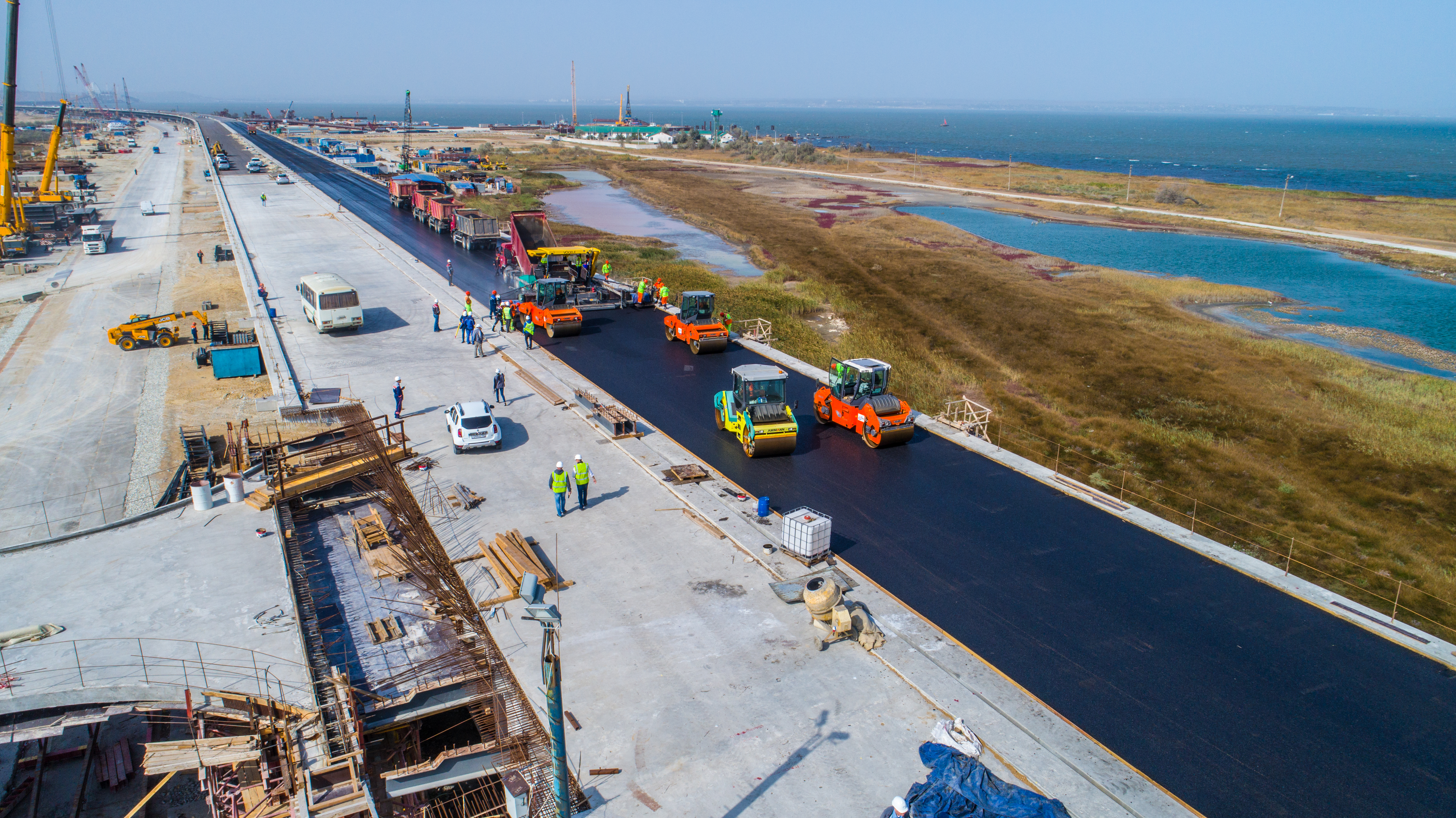
Asphalting the finished section of the road bridge from the side of Taman. On the opposite side, construction work is underway to connect the temporary ramp with the bridge.

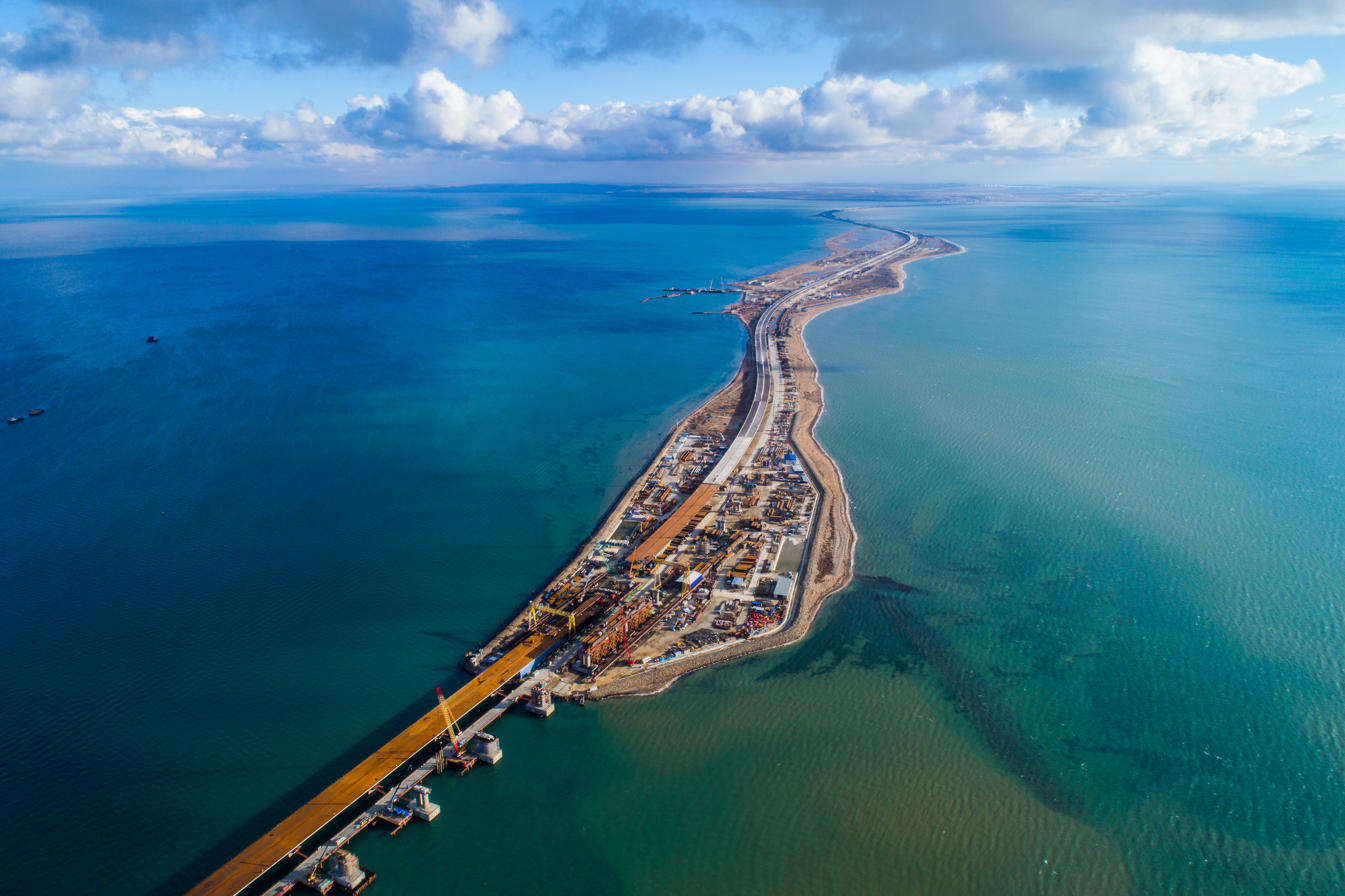
Concrete casting and asphalting of the overpass spans on Tuzla Island

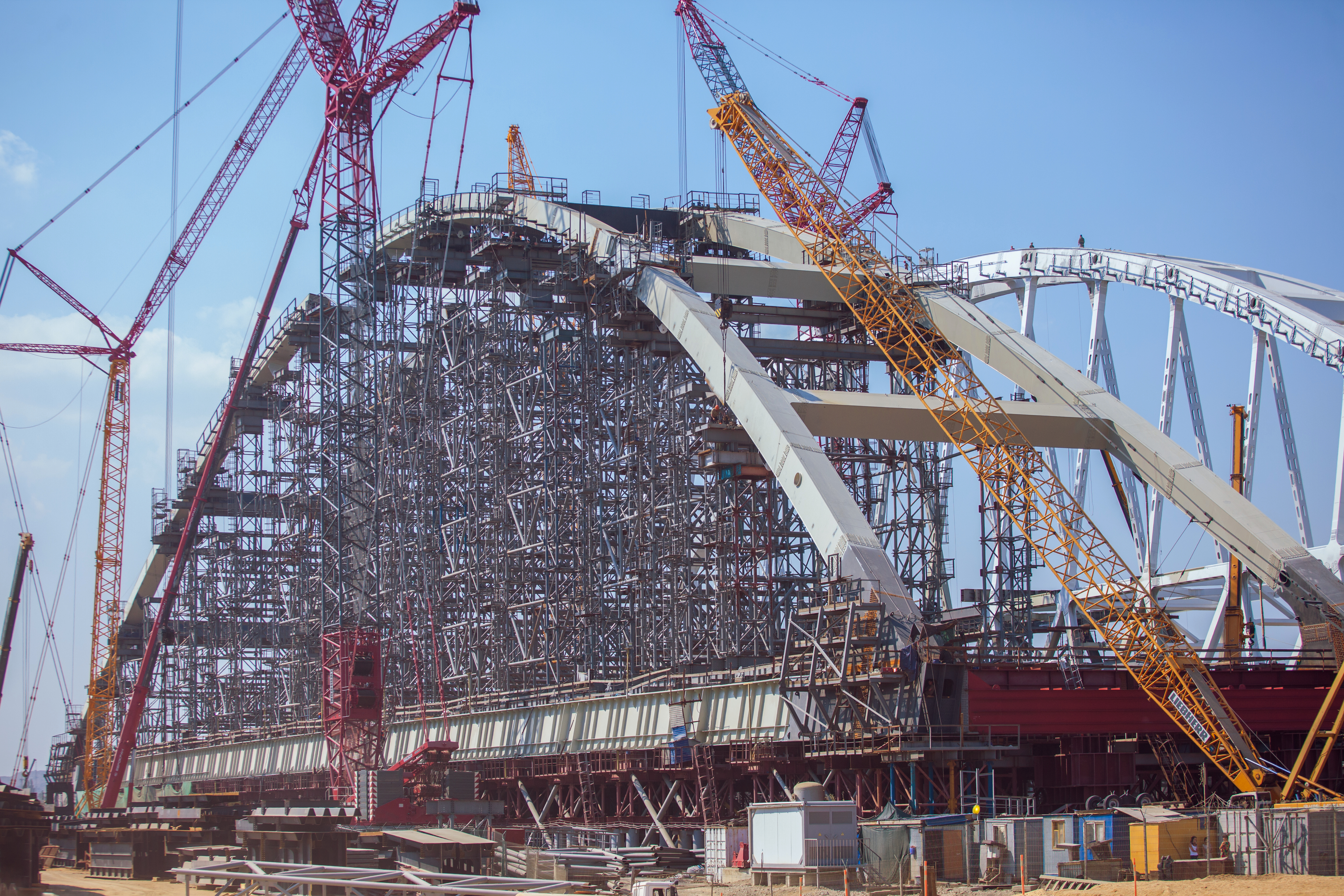
Completing the assembly of arches on the slipway and preparing them for transportation and installation on fairway supports

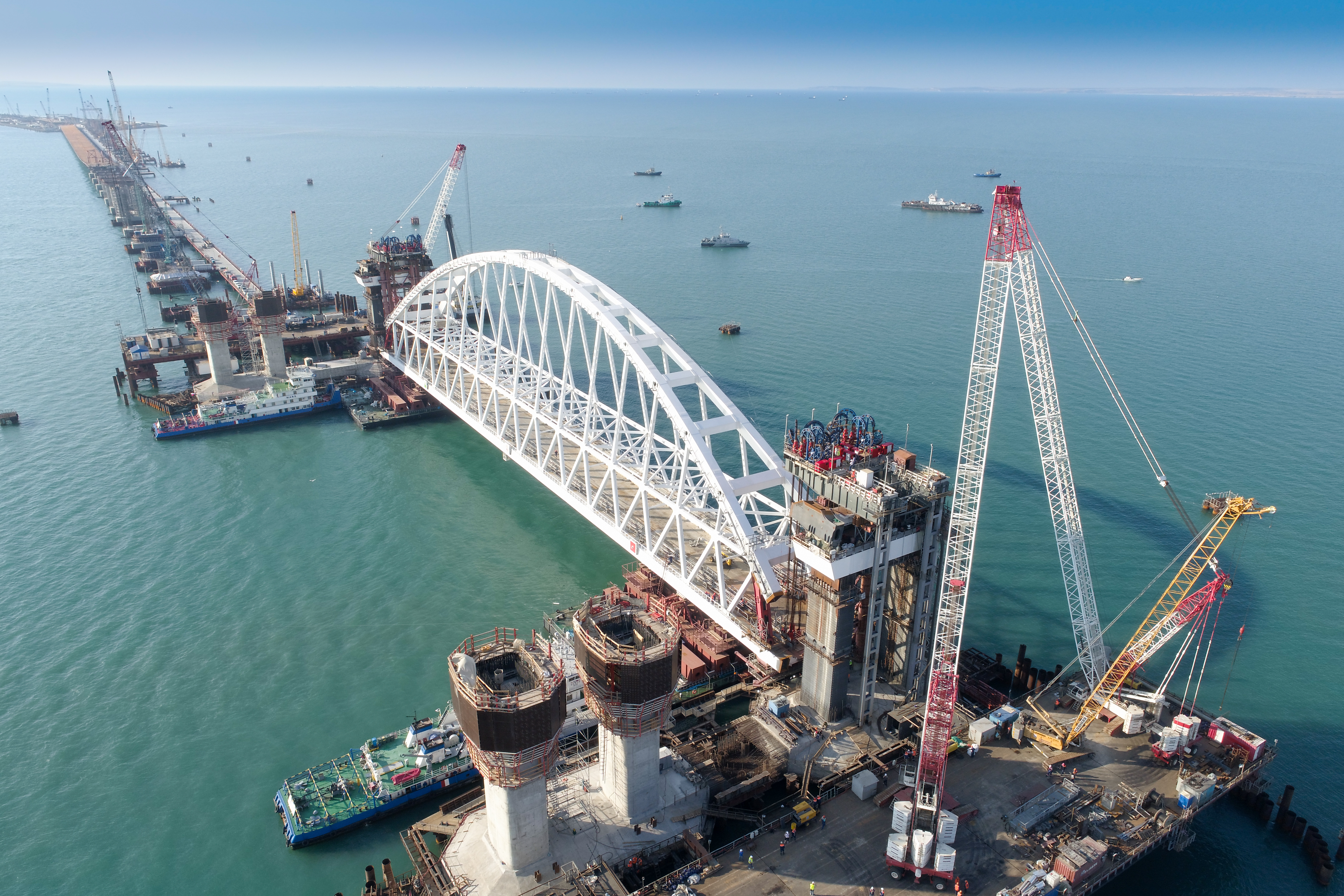
The installation of the railway arch in August 2017

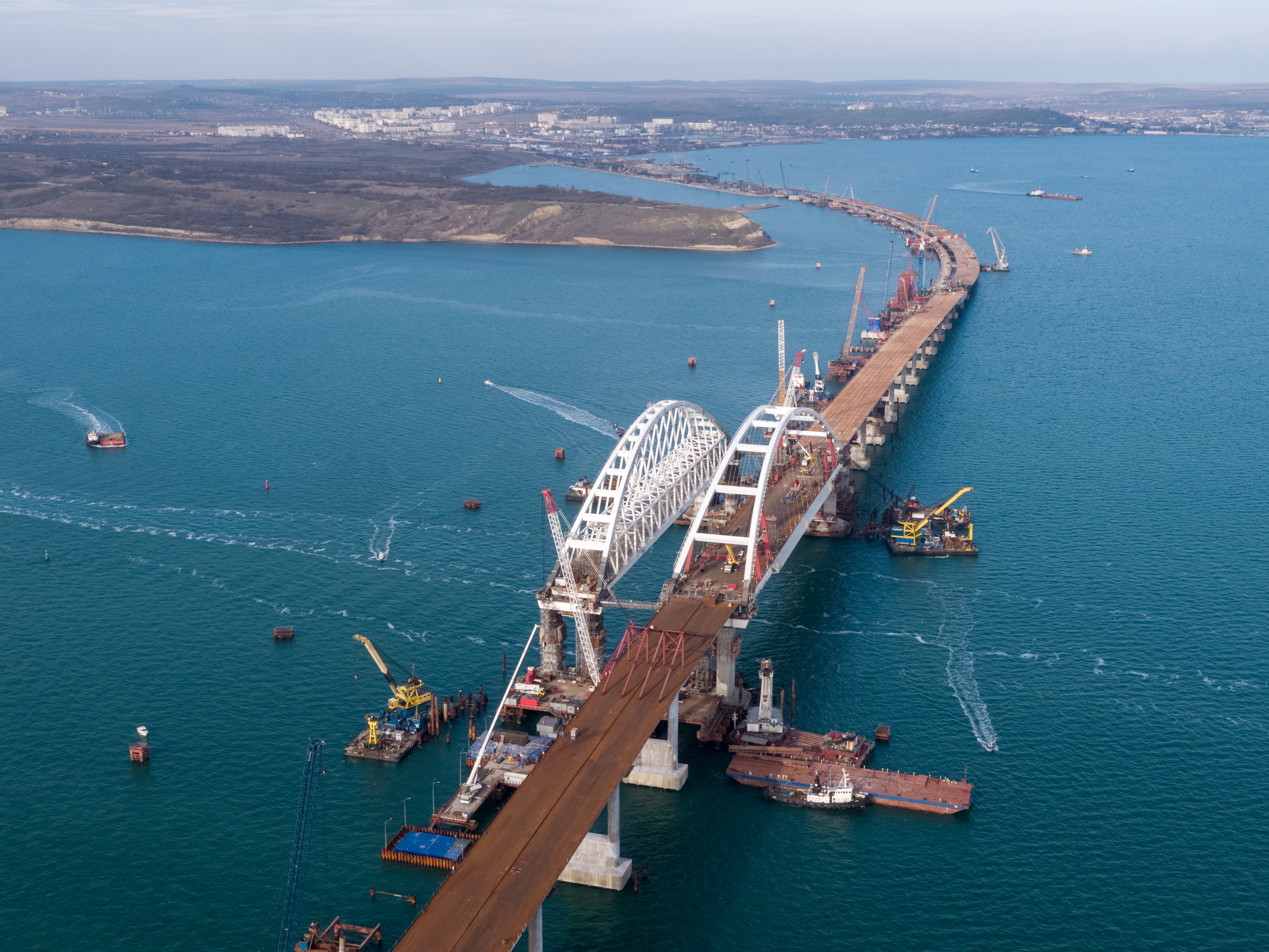
The installed arches of the bridge and the process of sliding the spans of the road bridge to the arch

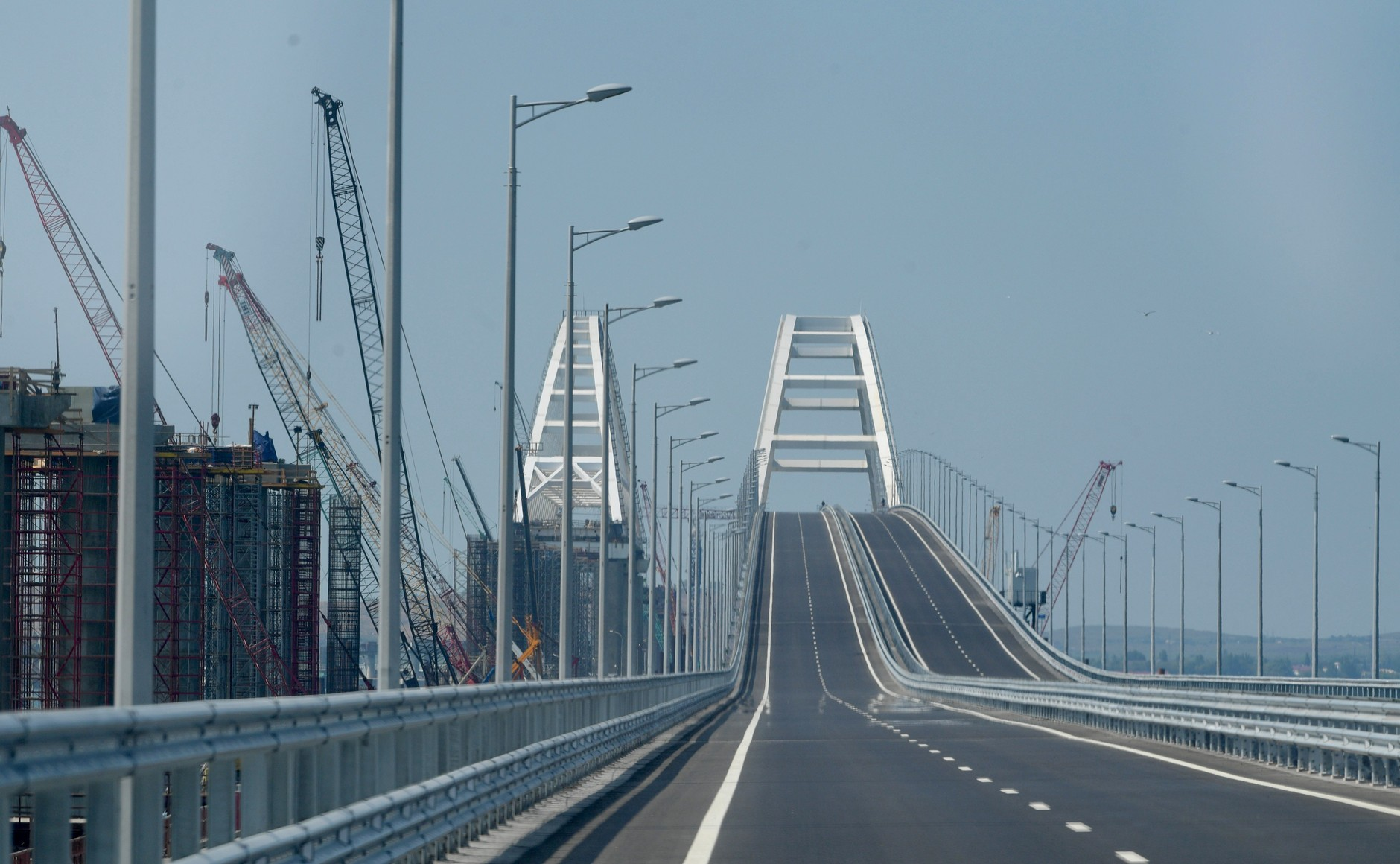
The road bridge on 15 May 2018. The rail bridge – under construction at the time – is visible on the left.

== Operation and impact ==
=== On Crimea and Russia ===
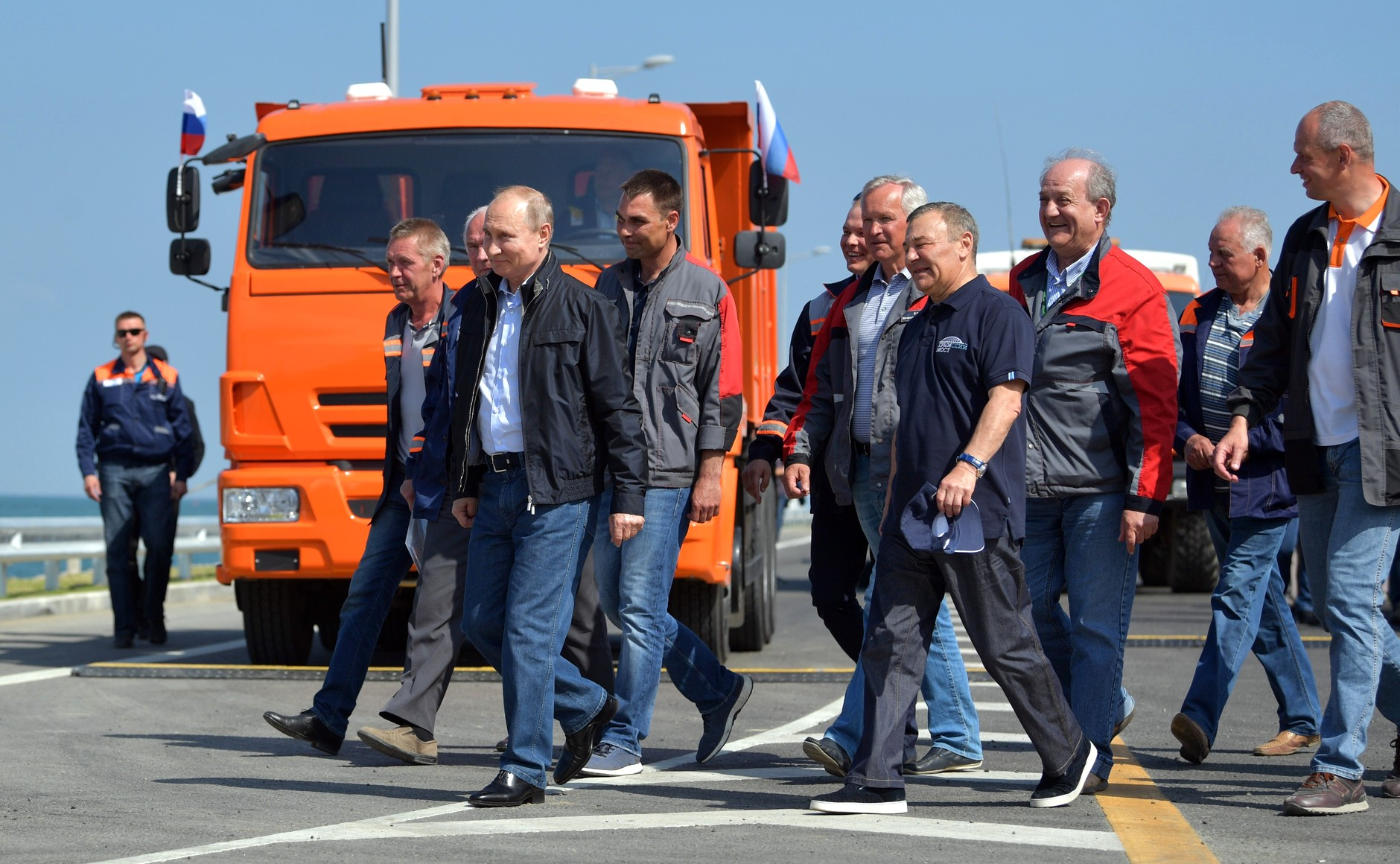
President Putin at the opening ceremony of the road section of the bridge, 15 May 2018

The road bridge, opened in 2018, quickly overtook the Kerch Strait ferry as a preferred route of communication between Crimea and Russia. In its first 12 hours of operation the bridge broke the traffic record of the ferry, which had been established in August 2017. After the bridge was opened for trucks in October 2018, truck transportation via the ferry virtually ceased. After the first full year of operation (May 2018 – May 2019) the road bridge had served three times more traffic than the Kerch Strait ferry had served in the whole of 2017.

Since the road bridge is free of charge, in contrast to the ferry, it is claimed that users of the bridge saved more than 16 billion roubles. The bridge is said to have contributed to an increase of the number of tourists visiting the Crimea, with bridge traffic peaking in the summer months – on 5 August 2018 the bridge broke a single-day record for car traffic, with 32,000 vehicles crossing the span, followed by over 33,000 vehicles on 12 August that year and over 35,000 a year later. The long roadway with few diversions occasionally becomes congested, with long traffic queues.

A fall in the price of retail goods in Crimea, which was expected to occur after the opening of the road bridge, did not happen. According to the local Russian administration, this situation persists because large retail groups are not operating in Crimea due to either risk of being sanctioned or because they deem Crimea a "logistic dead end", although there were expectations that the opening of the rail bridge would eventually contribute to a decrease in price of certain goods.

=== On Ukraine ===
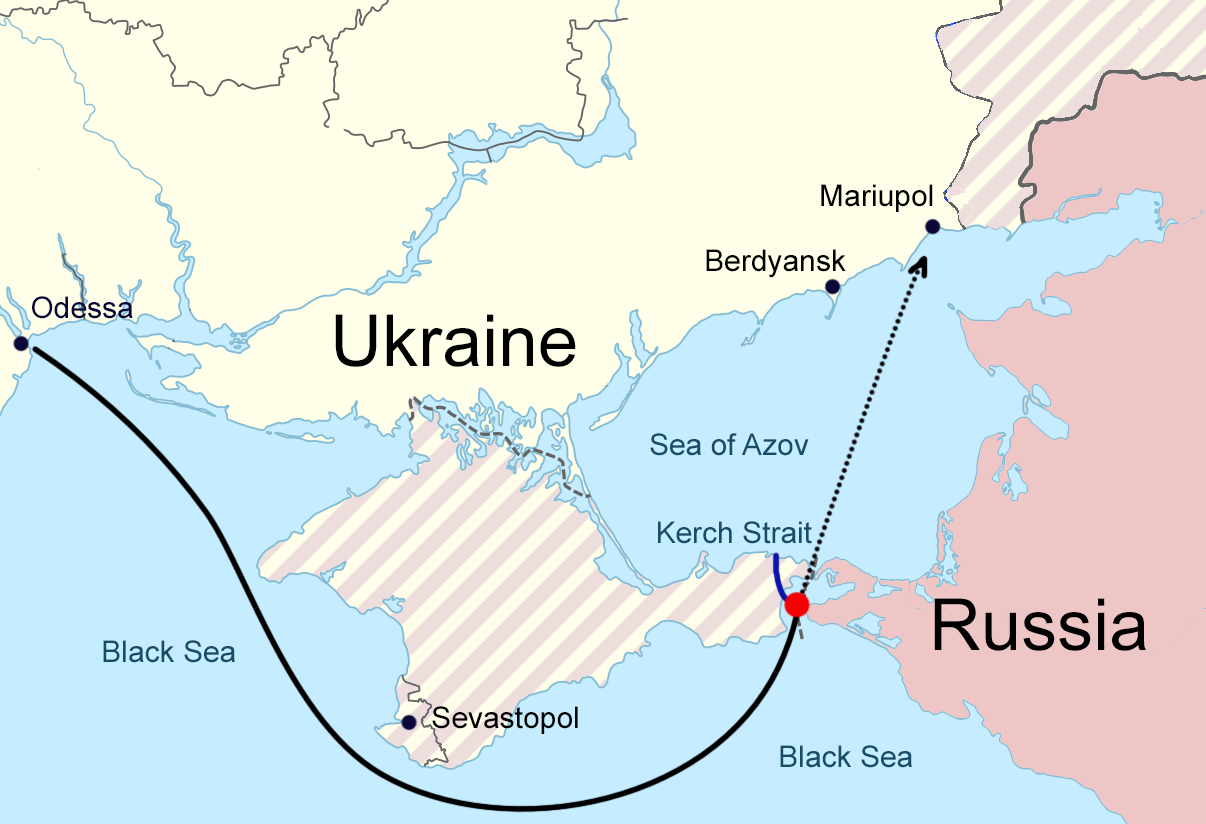
The Kerch Strait incident over the passage between the Black and Azov seas

The Russian bridge crossed the sole access point for ships travelling to and from Ukraine's eastern port cities, including Mariupol and Berdiansk through which Ukraine exported steel and agricultural products. Following completion of the bridge various restrictions were imposed on Ukrainian shipping which affect their operating costs, which Ukraine and others alleged was part of a creeping hybrid blockade of Ukrainian ports in the Azov Sea.

These restrictions, including Russian inspections of ships, had risen sharply since the bridge opened in May 2018, some being forced to wait for three days before being allowed through. Additionally, due to the height limits of the main span of the bridge (33 to 35 metres (108 to 115 ft) above sea level) the Ukrainian maritime authority said many ships are too big to pass safely under the bridge. The bulk carrier Copan (deadweight tonnage 17,777 tons) solved this problem by cutting off the top of her mast. On 26 October 2018, The Globe and Mail, citing Ukrainian sources, reported that the bridge had reduced Ukrainian shipping from its Sea of Azov ports by about 25%.

In November 2018, the area near the bridge became the site of the Kerch Strait incident, in which the Russian navy claimed that three Ukrainian vessels entered Russian territorial waters. Russian forces seized the vessels and arrested their crews. During this time, passage through the Strait was blocked by a large cargo ship, placed under the bridge to prevent passage of other craft. In response, Ukraine declared martial law in some regions of the country for 30 days.

== Archaeology ==
Part of a large Greek terracotta statue was found at the Crimean Bridge construction site, during underwater digging near the Ak-Burun Cape. According to archaeologists, this is a unique finding, since it is the first of its kind found in the northern Black Sea area.

== See also ==
- The Crimean Bridge. Made with Love!

Records
Preceded by Vasco da Gama Bridge	Europe's longest bridge 2018–present	Succeeded by Incumbent
Preceded by South overpass of the Western High-Speed Diameter	Russia's longest bridge 2018–present^{1}	Succeeded by Incumbent
Preceded by Øresund Bridge	Europe's longest railway bridge 2019–present	Succeeded by Incumbent
Preceded by Yuribey Bridge	Russia's longest railway bridge 2019–present	Succeeded by Incumbent
Notes and references
1. Longest bridge built by Russia, but whether longest in Russia depends on one's stance in the Crimean dispute.
