= Molfar (company) =

Ukrainian open-source intelligence company

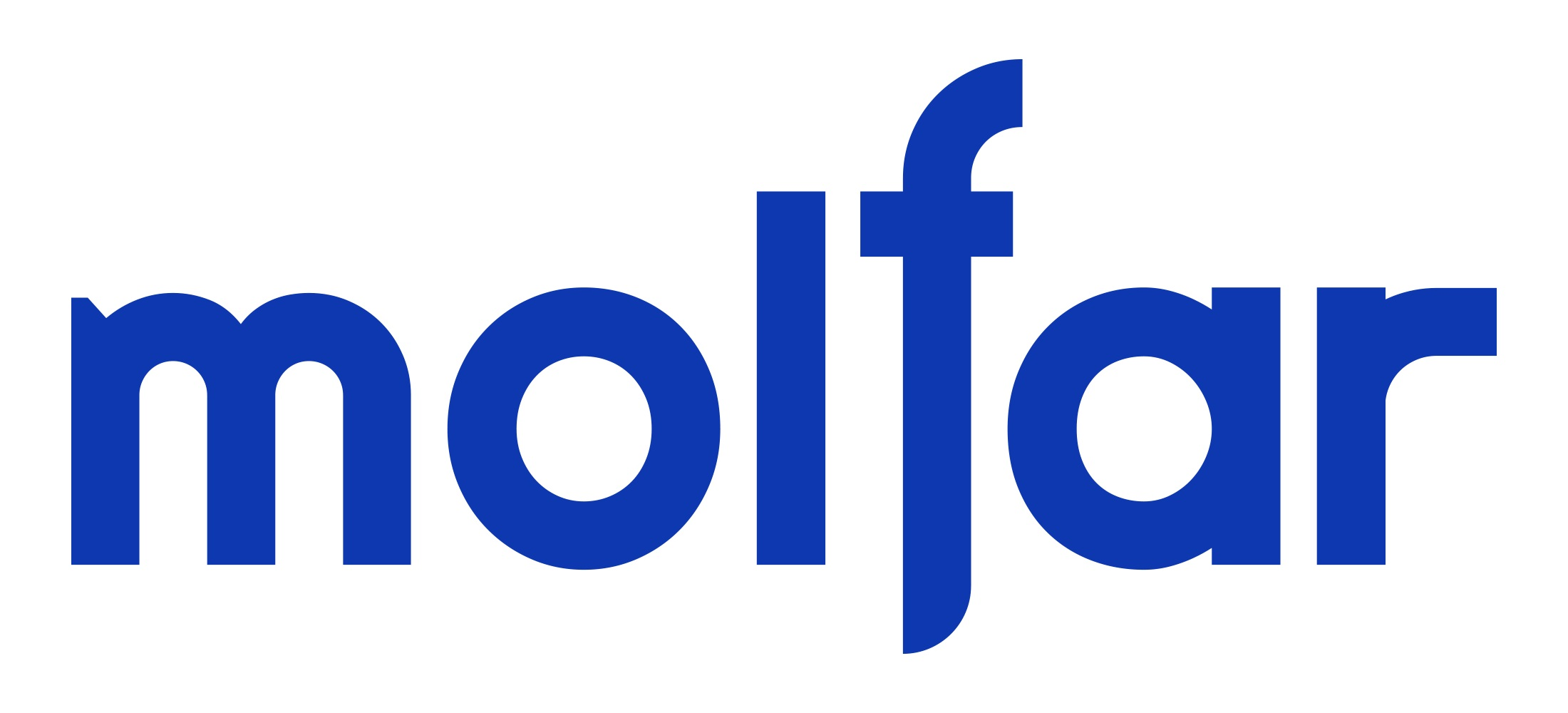
- Founded: 2019
- Founder: Artem Starosiek
- Headquarters: Kyiv, Ukraine
- Website: molfar.global

Molfar is a Ukrainian company that provides open-source intelligence services. Its community platform, with 35 analysts and over 200 volunteers, does

- identification of war criminals;
- reacting to Russian propaganda;
- investigation of war crimes;
- compiling a list of media sources which are unfriendly to Ukraine.

The company provides services in the field of competitive intelligence, training of OSINT specialists, industry analytics services, information systems vulnerability analysis, personal data protection, information searching in open sources and closed registers, preparation of reports on companies and people while maintaining the anonymity of the customer.

Among "foreign propagandists of the Russian Federation regime" Molfar lists the Vice President of the United States JD Vance, former Senior Advisor to the President of the United States and SpaceX founder Elon Musk, former Prime Minister of Hungary Viktor Orbán, former Director of the US National Counterterrorism Center Joe Kent, United States Senator Randal Paul, member of the U.S. House of Representatives Thomas Massie and other American and European officials. It also lists pundits and media personalities such as Tucker Carlson, Max Blumenthal, Aaron Maté, Ben Norton and Pilar Bonet.
