= Kerch–Yenikale Canal =

Maritime shipping canal in the Kerch Strait

Coordinates: 45.3064063°N 36.5049934°E

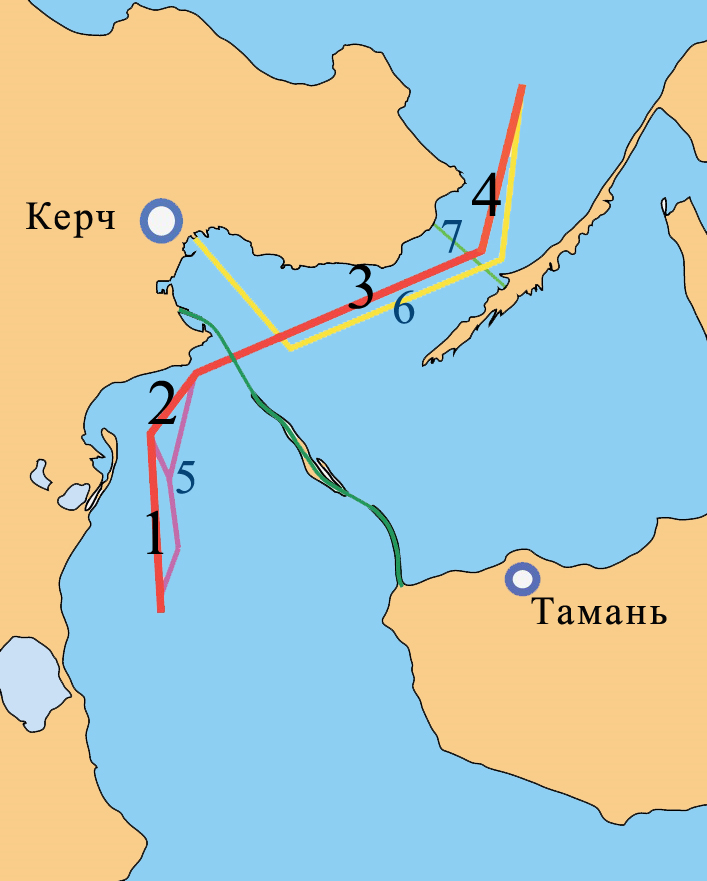
Kerch–Yenikale canal Approach channels 1. Pavlovsky Reach, 2. Burunsky Reach, 3. Yenikalsky Reach, 4. Chushkinsky Reach, 5. Fairway 52, 6. Fairway 50 and Kerch port approach channel, 7. Fairway 28 (Kerch ferry crossing).

The Kerch–Yenikale canal (Ukrainian: Керч-Єнікальський канал; Russian: Керчь-Еникальский канал) is a maritime shipping canal in the Kerch Strait, between the Sea of Azov and the Black Sea.

== History ==
In order to improve navigational capabilities of the Strait of Kerch, which is quite shallow in its narrowest point, the Kerch-Yenikale canal was dredged through the strait. The canal can accommodate vessels up to 215 meters long with a draft of up to 8 meters with compulsory pilot assistance.

The canal was built from 1874 to 1877. The initial depth of the canal was 5.7 m.

Since the Russian annexation of Crimea in 2014, the canal is fully controlled by Russia. The navigational procedures, including prior notification of intent to pass and limitations on vessel size and those due to weather conditions and marshalling into groups for one-way group passage, remain unchanged from the period of Ukrainian administration. During construction of the Crimean Bridge the canal was temporarily blocked for navigation.

== Sources ==
- Керчь-Еникальский пролив // Военная энциклопедия (Сытин, 1911–1915): т. 12: Кальяри — Кобелянка, с. 513–514
- Про затвердження Правил плавання суден Керч-Єнікальським каналом і підхідними каналами до нього // Наказ No.721 від 09.10.2002 Міністерства транспорту України (in Ukrainian)
