= Volgoneft-239 =

Russian oil tanker

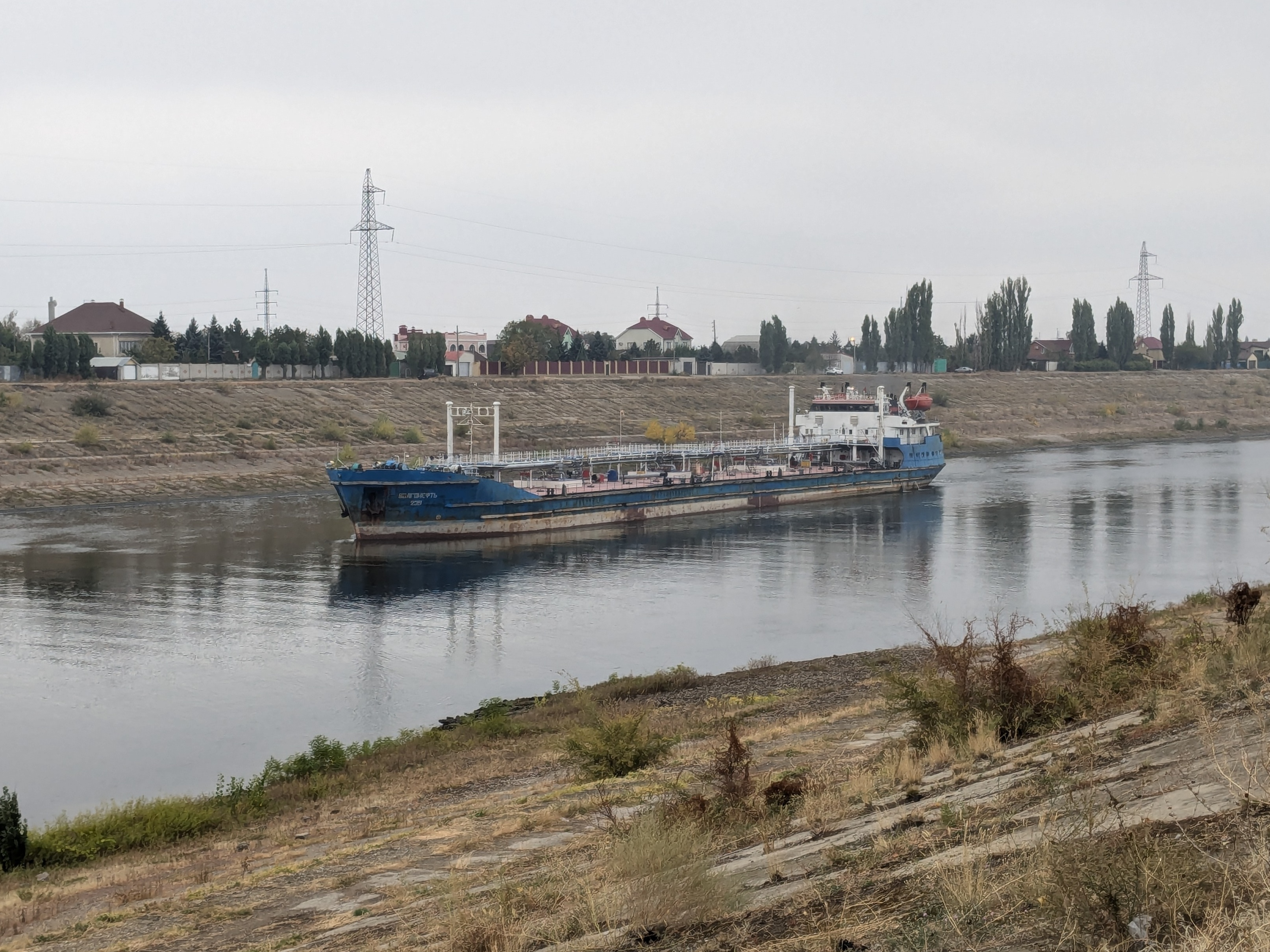
- Volgoneft-239 in 2024

History
- Name: Volgoneft-239
- Owner: 1973: Volgotanker; 2010: Volgatransneft
- Port of registry: 1973 (Soviet Union) Kuybyshevsky Zaton; 2010 (Russia) Nizhny Novgorod; 2015 (Russia) Astrakhan
- Builder: Volgograd shipyard, Volgograd
- Yard number: 935
- Identification: MMSI number: 273354600; Russian registration number 089939
- Fate: foundered, 15 December 2024

General characteristics
- Class & type: Project 1577 oil tanker
- Tonnage: 3,566 GRT, 1,760 NRT
- Displacement: 6,513 tonnes
- Length: 132.6 m (435 ft)
- Beam: 16.9 m (55 ft)
- Draught: 3.62 m (11.9 ft)
- Depth: 5.5 m (18 ft)
- Decks: 1
- Installed power: 2 × diesel engines; 2 × 736 kW
- Propulsion: 2 × screws
- Speed: 11 knots (20 km/h)
- Crew: 22 or 23

MV Volgoneft-239 (Волгонефть-239) is a Project 1577 Volgoneft oil tanker that was built in the Soviet Union in 1973. She ran aground in a storm in the Kerch Strait in 2024. Another Project 1577 tanker, Volgoneft-212, broke in two and foundered nearby in the same storm, causing the 2024 Kerch Strait oil spill. The Volgoneft-239 was emptied, dismantled and recycled afterward. The dismantling was filmed by Russian videographers and can be seen on the internet where permitted.

== Description ==
Project 1577 is a Soviet design of tanker that was intended for "mixed navigation": operating on the canals and large navigable rivers of European Russia; and also short-sea shipping in favourable sea conditions, with waves no more than 2 metres (6 ft 7 in) high. The Volgograd shipyard ("Волгоградский судостроительный завод") in Volgograd built many of them. Volgoneft-239 was built as yard number 935, and completed in 1973. Her length is 132.6 m (435 ft); her beam 16.9 m (55 ft); and her depth 5.5 m (18 ft). Her tonnages were 3,566 GRT and 1,760 NRT. When laden with a full cargo of 4,875 tonnes of kerosene, her draught is 3.62 m (11.9 ft), and she displaced 6,513 tonnes. She had two fixed-pitch screws, each driven by a 8NVD48A diesel engine rated at 736 kW. Her twin engines gave her a speed of 11 knots (20 km/h). She also had twin rudders. She had berths for 22 or 23 crew.

Volgoneft-239 was originally owned by Volgotanker and registered in Kuybyshevsky Zaton. In 2010, Volgatransneft acquired the ship, and her registration was transferred to Nizhny Novgorod. Her registration was transferred again, to Astrakhan, in 2015. Her MMSI number was 273354600, and her Russian registration number was 089939.

== Loss ==
One Russian source stated that Volgoneft-239 was unfit for service in sea conditions with waves more than 2 metres (6 ft 7 in) high. In seas any higher than 2 metres, waves could lift her fore and aft, and leave her unsupported amidships, which could cause her structural damage. One Project 1577 ship, Volgoneft-248, had broken in two in 1999 in such circumstances. Also, by December 2024, the Russian Maritime Register of Shipping had suspended Volgoneft-239's documents. She should not have been in service at all.

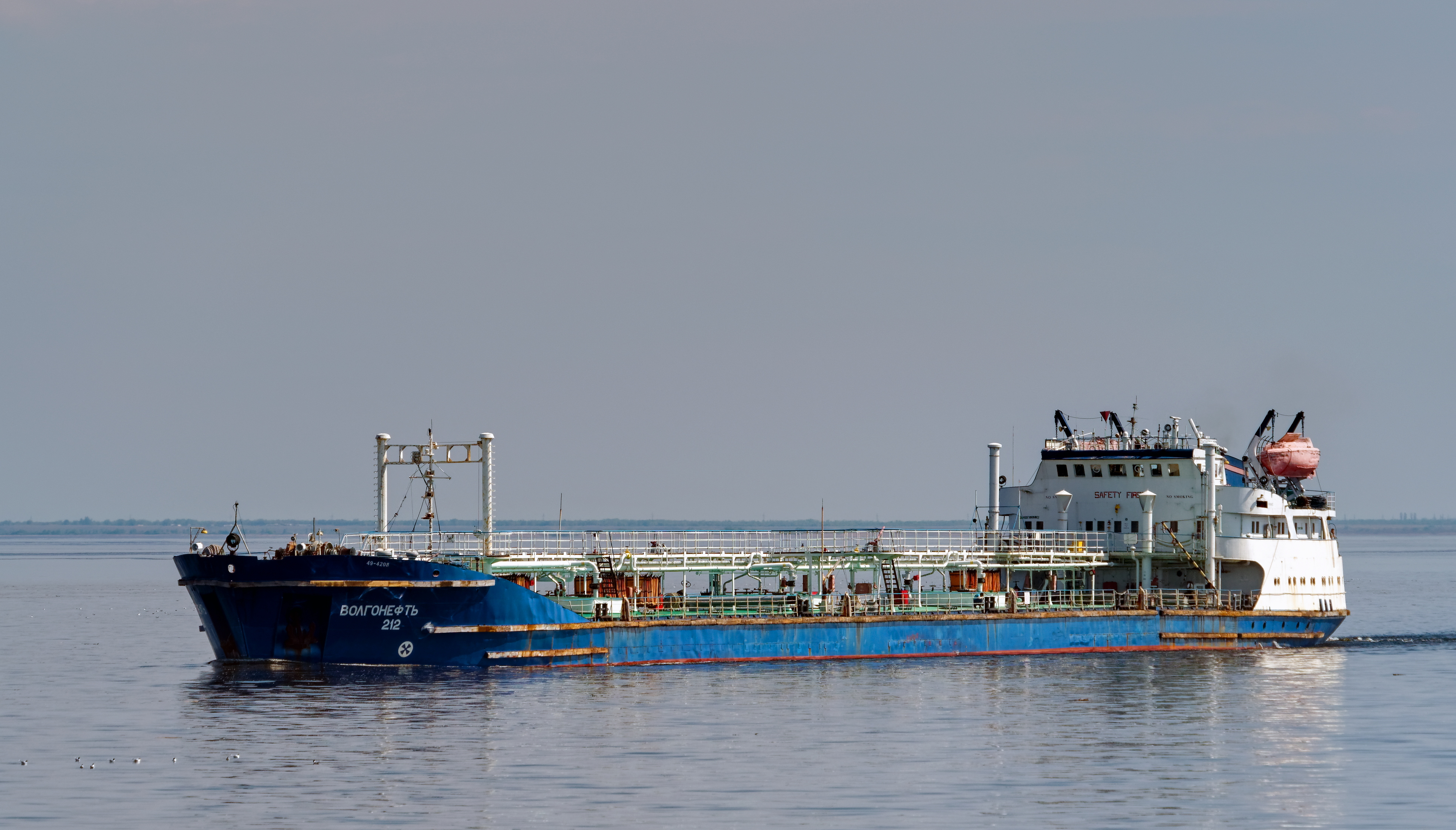
Volgoneft-212 in 2018

Nevertheless, in December 2024 she left the port of Azov on the river Don, carrying a full cargo of about 4,200 tonnes of oil. On 15 December, a storm caught Volgoneft-239 and one of her sister ships, Volgoneft-212, in the Black Sea just south of the Kerch Strait. Volgoneft-212, which was fully laden with a cargo of mazut; broke in two; her stern section sank, and her wreck started leaking mazut into the sea. Her crew was rescued, but one member later died of hypothermia. Volgoneft-239 was damaged; drifted; and grounded about 80 metres (260 ft) from the shore near Taman in Krasnodar Krai. The next day, all 14 of Volgoneft-239's crew were rescued. On 16 December, Novaya Gazeta reported Deputy Prime Minister Vitaly Savelyev as stating that both ships were believed to have leaked some of their oil, but the leaks had now stopped. However, a source quoted by Izvestia on 17 December claimed that Volgoneft-239 had not leaked her cargo.

== Investigation ==
On 15 December, the Investigative Department of the Investigative Committee of Russia (IC) for Crimea and Sevastopol launched criminal investigations into the loss of both ships. Within hours, after it was known that a member of Volgoneft-212's crew died, the IC reclassified its investigation into the loss of that ship to the more serious offence of "Violation of the rules and operation of maritime transport, resulting in the death of a person by negligence". On 18 December, the captains of both tankers were criminally charged, and on 19 December, both men appeared in court. The court put the captain of Volgoneft-212 in pre-trial detention for two months, and placed the captain of Volgoneft-239 under house arrest for two months.

Also on 19 December, in his annual "Results of the Year" news conference, President Vladimir Putin blamed the two captains. He said that other ships sought safe anchorages before the storm, but the captains of Volgoneft-212 and Volgoneft-239 failed to do so.

== Salvage ==
Fuel oil was salvaged from the submerged bow in mid-August, 2026, but satellite imagery on Aug 26 showed oil films near the wreck. Salvage of hull is expected.
