= Volgoneft-212 =

Russian oil tanker

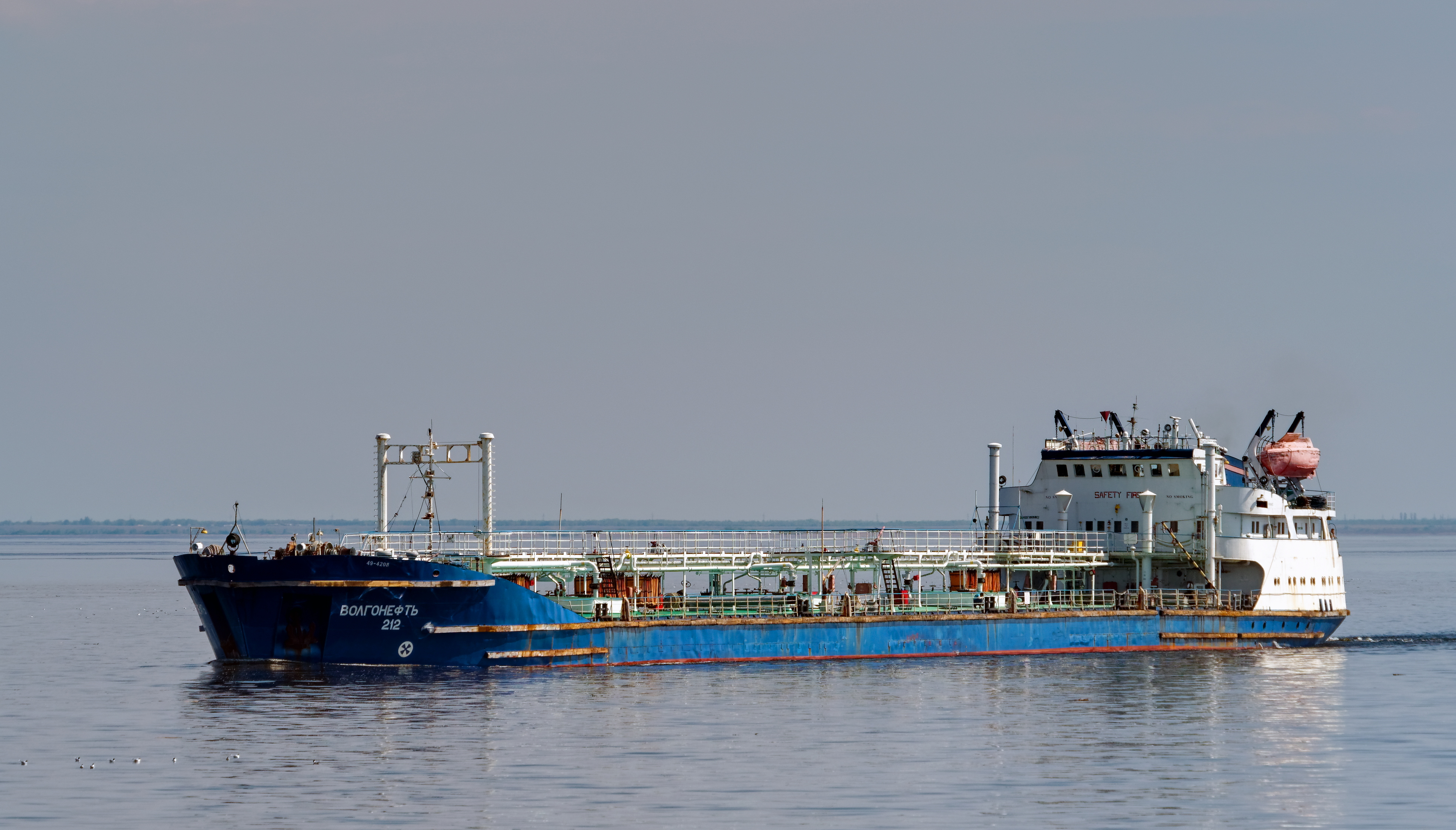
- Volgoneft-212 in 2018

History
- Name: Volgoneft-212
- Owner: 1969: Volgotanker; 2014: KamaTransOil
- Operator: 2014: Kama Shipping
- Port of registry: 1969 (Soviet Union) Kuybyshevsky Zaton; 2006 (Russia) Samara; 2015 (Russia) St Petersburg
- Builder: Volgograd shipyard, Volgograd
- Yard number: 908
- Completed: 15 December 1969
- Refit: 2024
- Identification: IMO number: 7024976; Russian registration number 089722; call sign UBQB2
- Fate: broke in two, 15 December 2024

General characteristics
- Class & type: Project 1577 oil tanker
- Tonnage: 3,566 GRT, 1,760 NRT
- Displacement: 6,513 tonnes
- Length: 1969: 132.6 m (435 ft); 2024: 136 m (446 ft)
- Beam: 16.9 m (55 ft)
- Draught: 3.62 m (11.9 ft)
- Depth: 5.5 m (18 ft)
- Decks: 1
- Installed power: 2 × diesel engines; 2 × 736 kW
- Propulsion: 2 × screws
- Speed: 11 knots (20 km/h)
- Crew: 22 or 23

MV Volgoneft-212 (Волгонефть-212) was a Project 1577 Volgoneft oil tanker that was built in the Soviet Union in 1969. She broke in two in a storm in the Kerch Strait in 2024, causing the 2024 Kerch Strait oil spill. Another Project 1577 tanker, Volgoneft-239, ran aground nearby in the same storm. Volgoneft-212 is not the first Project 1577 tanker to have broken in two in a heavy sea. Volgoneft-248 did so in similar circumstances in the Sea of Marmara in 1999.

== Description ==
Project 1577 is a Soviet design of tanker that was intended for "mixed navigation": operating on the canals and large navigable rivers of European Russia; and also short-sea shipping in favourable sea conditions, with waves no more than 2 metres (6 ft 7 in) high. The Volgograd shipyard ("Волгоградский судостроительный завод") in Volgograd built many of them. Volgoneft-212 was built as yard number 908, and completed on 15 December 1969. As built, her length was 132.6 m (435 ft). Her beam was 16.9 m (55 ft) was, and her depth 5.5 m (18 ft). Her tonnages were 3,566 GRT and 1,760 NRT. When laden with a full cargo of 4,875 tonnes of kerosene, her draught is 3.62 m (11.9 ft), and she displaced 6,513 tonnes. She had two fixed-pitch screws, each driven by a 8NVD48A diesel engine rated at 736 kW. Her twin engines gave her a speed of 11 knots (20 km/h). She also had twin rudders. She had berths for 22 or 23 crew.

Volgoneft-212 was originally owned by Volgotanker and registered in Kuybyshevsky Zaton. In 2006 her registration was transferred to Samara. In 2014, KamaTransOil acquired the ship and appointed Kama Shipping to manage her. At the same time, her registration was transferred to St Petersburg. Her IMO number was 7024976, her Russian registration number was 089722, and her call sign was UBQB2.

== Refit ==
One source states that Volgoneft-212 was re-fitted in 2024, and that her refit included cutting her in two and joining her together again. The same source claims that her length was 136 m (446 ft), which is 3.4 m (11 ft) longer than a standard Project 1577 tanker. Therefore, she seems to have been slightly lengthened during her refit.

== Loss ==
On 10 November 2024, Volgoneft-212 left the port of Saratov for Port Kavkaz on the Kerch Strait. This was one of two trips she made carrying oil from the Rosneft oil refinery there. She also made a trip carrying oil from the Rosneft refinery at Syzran.

One Russian source stated that Volgoneft-212 was unfit for service in sea conditions with waves more than 2.5 metres (8 ft 2 in) high. In seas any higher than 2.5 metres, waves could lift her fore and aft, and leave her unsupported amidships, which could cause her structural damage. On the morning of 15 December 2024, a storm caught Volgoneft-212 and one of her sister ships, Volgoneft-239, in the Black Sea just south of the Kerch Strait. Volgoneft-212 broke in two, and her stern section sank. She was fully laden with a cargo of about 4,300 tons of mazut, and this started leaking into the sea. All 13 members of her crew gathered on her bridge and donned lifejackets, expecting to be rescued by the rescue tug Mercuriy (Меркурий). They were about to launch the a liferaft when a Mil Mi-8 helicopter arrived and airlifted them to safety. However, one crew member later died of hypothermia.

Volgoneft-239 broke in to with her bow sinking, the rest drifted; and grounded about 80 metres (260 ft) from the shore near Taman in Krasnodar Krai. The next day, all 14 of Volgoneft-239's crew were rescued. Interfax reported that of the 26 survivors from the two tankers, 11 were in a serious condition in hospital.

== Investigation ==
On 15 December, the Investigative Department of the Investigative Committee of Russia (IC) for Crimea and Sevastopol launched criminal investigations into the loss of both ships. Within hours, after it was known that a member of Volgoneft-212's crew died, the IC reclassified its investigation into the loss of that ship to the more serious offence of "Violation of the rules and operation of maritime transport, resulting in the death of a person by negligence". On 18 December, the captains of both tankers were criminally charged, and on 19 December, both men appeared in court. The court put the captain of Volgoneft-212 in pre-trial detention for two months, and placed the captain of Volgoneft-239 under house arrest for two months.

Also on 19 December, in his annual "Results of the Year" news conference, President Vladimir Putin blamed the two captains. He said that other ships sought safe anchorages before the storm, but the captains of Volgoneft-212 and Volgoneft-239 failed to do so.

== Salvage ==
Fuel oil was salvaged from the submerged stern in mid-August, 2026, but satellite imagery on Aug 26 showed oil films near the wreck. Salvage of hull is expected.
