= 2024 Black Sea oil spill =

Oil spill involving two Russian oil tankers

2024 Kerch Strait oil spill
- Interactive map of 2024 Kerch Strait oil spill
- Location: Southern mouth of the Kerch Strait, entering into the Black Sea
- Coordinates: 45°04′18″N 36°35′53″E
- Date: 15 December 2024

Cause
- Cause: Inclement weather; Potential safety breaches
- Casualties: Fatalities; One crew member killed One volunteer potentially killed by inhalation of toxic fumes (Note: As of 4 February the cause of death is still unconfirmed, however the volunteer did die overnight after assisting in clean-up efforts in Anapa); Injuries; 146 volunteers, three of which were hospitalised (Note: Between December 15, 2024 and January 15, 2025, according to Krasnodar Krai Minister of Health Yevgeny Filippov)
- Operator: Volgotanker (according to databases) (Note: According to a report from TradeWinds, ownership of both ships is "murky". They cited unidentified databases as saying that both ships are controlled by Volgotanker, though the company is under bankruptcy proceedings and have made attempts to sell off their assets.) Volgoneft-212: KamaTransOil; Kama Shipping; Volgoneft-239: Volgotransneft

Spill characteristics
- Volume: Estimated 2,400 or 5,000 tonnes of mazut
- Area: Black Sea; Kerch Strait; Sea of Azov
- Shoreline impacted: Western Krasnodar Krai; All but northern Crimea; Berdiansk spit and a spit to the east

Early in the morning of 15 December 2024, two Russian Project 1577 Volgoneft oil tankers, Volgoneft-212 and Volgoneft-239, were caught in a storm just south of the Kerch Strait. Volgoneft-212, which was reportedly carrying about 4,900 tonnes of mazut, broke in two and sank, resulting in an oil spill and the death of one crew member. Volgoneft-239 was damaged, causing her to drift for several hours until she ran aground near the Port of Taman, Krasnodar Krai. She, too, began leaking oil.

Both ships still had some of their cargo intact and the oil leak on Volgoneft-239 was stopped by the next day, with an estimated spillage of either 2,400 or 5,000 tonnes. (Note: The Russian Ministry of Transport reports that 2,400 tonnes had been spilled as of 2 January 2025, while BBC Verify says that 5,000 tonnes had been spilled as of 24 January that year.) Reports of puddles of oil making landfall between the Crimean Bridge and the town of Anapa began on 17 December, with about 37 miles (60 kilometres) of coastline becoming polluted. As a result, a state of emergency was declared in the Anapsky and Temryuksky Districts that day. Further declarations occurred across the entirety of Krasnodar Krai on 25 December, federally the following day and in Crimea by 28 December.

The incident was noted by the Russian Ministry of Transport as the first spillage of mazut in history, a substance which the organisation noted had "no proven methods for removing it from the water column" due to its properties. It was later labelled as the "worst ecological disaster of the 21st century" by Viktor Danilov-Danilyan, head of the Water Problems Institute of the Russian Academy of Sciences and ex-minister of the Ministry of Natural Resources and Environment.

The environmental impacts were stark, polluting the coastline to varying degrees across large portions of the northern Black Sea coastline and areas of the Sea of Azov and killing both birds and marine animals. By 8 January 2025, 175 sea birds had died at a single rehabilitation centre, by 11 January 111 cetaceans were found washed up on the Krasnodar Krai and Crimean coasts and by 7 February approximately 5,000 jellyfish had washed up on a section of coast in Odesa Oblast.

Separate criminal cases were opened by Russia into both ships for potential maritime safety breaches, though the case for Operational-Tactical-212 had an additional charge for negligent homicide. Both captains were charged on 18 December, with the captain of Volgoneft-212 being placed under investigative custody and the captain of Volgoneft-239 being placed under house arrest for two months each.

== Background ==
=== Kerch Strait ===
The Kerch Strait separates the Kerch Peninsula in Crimea and the Taman Peninsula in Russia's Krasnodar Krai, connecting the Black Sea and the Sea of Azov. Several ships have been either damaged or sunk in storms in or near the Kerch Strait.

Volgoneft-139 was carrying 4,800 tonnes of fuel oil when she anchored in the Kerch Strait in a storm in November 2007. She split in two, spilling from 1,300 to 1,600 tonnes of oil, resulting in "tens of kilometres" of pollution on both sides of the Kerch Strait. 13 crew members were rescued, and four other ships sank in the storm.

On 19 April 2017, the Panamanian-registered 3,500 tonne bulk carrier Geroi Arsenala split in two and sank about 19 nautical miles (35 km) south of the Taman Peninsula between the Port of Azov in Rostov Oblast and Turkey while carrying grain in a storm. One crew member was rescued, while a further two were later found dead; nine were missing.

In November 2023, the Strait was closed due to severe stormy weather as a measure to prevent damage to ships. Despite this, during the closure, two ships, Matros Shevchenko and Matros Pozynich, stopped close to each other in the Strait. The pair collided at low speed, drifting into an anchored ship, Kavkaz-5.

=== Environmental issues in the Black Sea and the Sea of Azov ===
The Black Sea and the Sea of Azov have faced numerous issues since the 20th century including the polluting effects of the aforementioned incidents and from nearby ports and rivers; the ongoing Russo-Ukrainian War, with ships being sunk, underwater explosions and Russia using protected lands as training grounds or extraction sites for materials; overfishing; invasive species; and climate change. These issues have caused changes to the local ecosystems and caused some species to disappear.

Since the beginning of the Russian invasion of Ukraine however, these negative effects were greatly exacerbated. There has been a rapid die-off of dolphins, porpoises and other cetaceans, with cases of live animals washing up on shore also increasing. The highest rate of cases is around Crimea, particularly near to Sevastopol, where several Russian bases reside. In early 2022, Russian warships began blockading Ukrainian ports. The release of ballast water by the warships is not monitored, allowing pollutants and invasive species from other areas to enter the environment. Sunken warships also caused several oil spills, with the spills extending tens of thousands of square kilometres, including into protected waters, with oil polymerization in the water causing mass bird deaths.

Fires from military activities have also damaged several national parks. As an example, a total of 131 fires were recorded on the Kinburn Peninsula, a protected area for marine and coastal colonies, in 2022, destroying over 5,000 hectares of the park and the nesting places of about 100 bird species.

Following the destruction of the Kakhovka Dam on 6 June 2023, several protected areas were flooded, with freshwater polluted by fuels, lubricants, fertilizers and wastewater from settlements and fields entering the Black Sea. In the days that followed, rapid desalination of sea water from 14 to 4ppm was discovered in the waters near Odesa, Ukraine. In some coastal areas, researchers noted acute toxicity in the water, with nitrogen concentrations drastically rising, an indicator of direct sewage pollution. Polluted water was also found in the Danube River. About 30,000 animals were killed as a result, with species such as the squacco heron and the little egret disappearing.

Despite this, in the years preceding 2023, researchers noticed indicators that some ecosystems had begun gradually recovering. Although it is currently impossible to assess the impacts on the Sea of Azov, researchers were able to have limited access to the Black Sea. What they discovered is that, due to tourist travel being banned in the north western Black Sea due to mining and a lessening in commercial ships and fishing, there had been a lessening of pressure on ecosystems. Several species considered rare had also become more common with the lack of tourism.

=== Volgoneft-212 and Volgoneft-239 ===
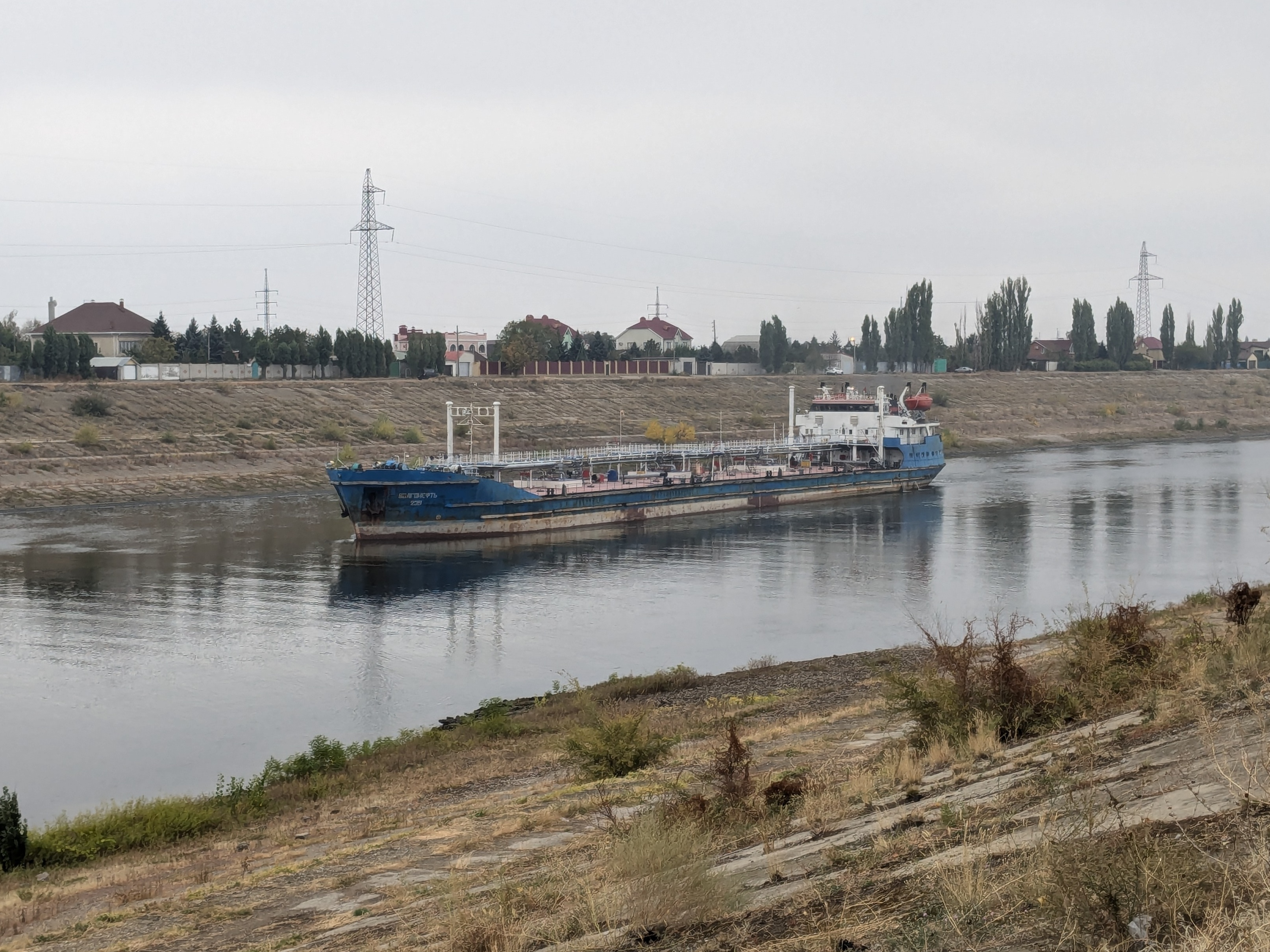
Volgoneft-239 in 2024

Volgoneft-212 was built in 1969, was 136 metres in length and was registered in Saint Petersburg. She was owned and managed by KamaTransOil and Kama Shipping, both of which are based in Perm, Russia. They acquired the ship in 2014 and have a licence to transport dangerous cargo by inland waterways and sea indefinitely, which was issued in 2016. Kama Shipping was fined ₽400,000 ($6,406) in 2019 for, between 1 May and 23 July that year, transporting dangerous cargo by sea without a special permit.

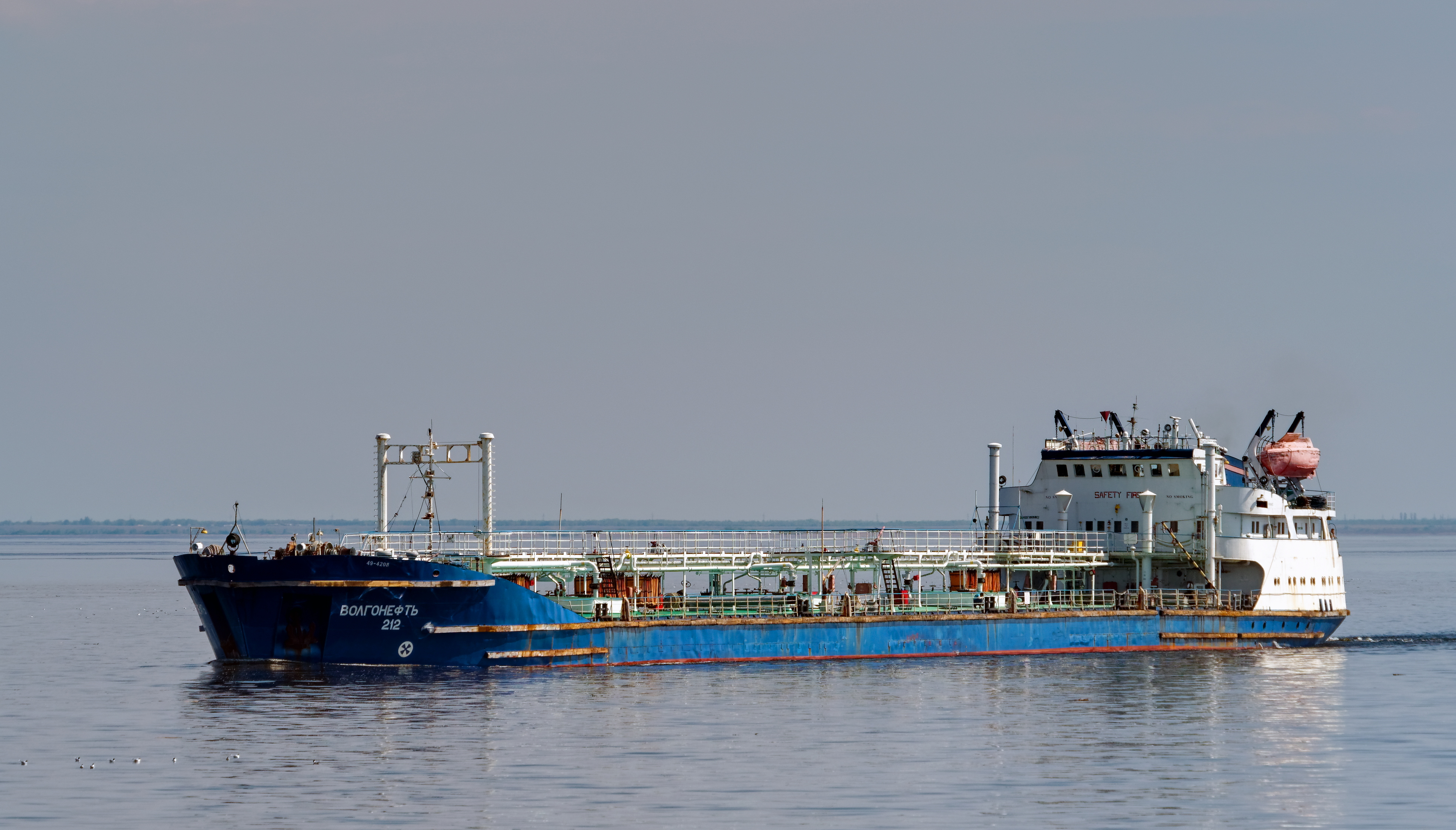
Volgoneft-212 in 2018

Volgoneft-212 was refitted in 2024, with The Guardian reporting that in this refit "the centre was cut out and the stern and bow were welded together, forming a huge seam in the middle. It is this section that appears to have broken."

Volgoneft-239 was built in 1973, is 132 metres in length and was registered in Astrakhan and has been owned and operated by Volgotransneft since 2010. Both tankers have a maximum loading capacity of about 4,200 tonnes. Mash reported that both ships were reclassified some time in the 1990s from purely riverine traffic to river and maritime use.

Databases claim that both ships are controlled by Volgotanker, a company based in Samara which transports oil products in Russia's inland waterways and along the coast of the Black Sea. Almost all of their ships were built between 1966 and 1990 with a capacity of between 4,000 and 5,000 dwt. The actual ownership of the ships was called "murky" by TradeWinds due to bankruptcy proceedings against them and attempts to sell off their assets.

==== Certifications ====
iStories reported that, in the months prior to the incident, both ships had been shuttling between Port Kavkaz in the Kerch Strait and oil refinery terminals on the Volga River. They further reported that, according to the certifications held by both ships, neither were allowed in the Kerch Strait during December, with restrictions in place for travel in November should wind speed and wave height limits be met.

According to Igor Kovalchuk, an employee from the Russian Professional Union of Seafarers, the maximum wave height for Volgoneft-212 was 2.5 metres (8.2 ft), and the maximum for Volgoneft-239 was 2 metres (6 ft 7 in). Both were rated for wind speeds of up to 40 miles per hour (64 km/h). According to iStories, the wave height limit for Volgoneft-212 in the Kerch Strait was 2 metres (6.6 ft) and Volgoneft-239's was 1.5 metres (4.9 ft) 1.5 meters.

Izvestia reported that both tankers should have been decommissioned 10–15 years prior to the incident as they have a service life of between 30 and 40 years. Both were tested for their suitability for transporting dangerous cargo in July 2024. Volgoneft-239 had had its licence suspended on 30 November, and thus should not have been at sea.

== Disaster ==
Early in the morning of 15 December 2024, Volgoneft-212 and Volgoneft-239 were heading south out of the Kerch Strait, entering the more open waters of the Black Sea. Volgoneft-212 had 13 crew on board, while Volgoneft-239 had 14 crew on board; both ships were carrying mazut, a low grade heavy fuel oil used in various applications across the former Soviet Union and Iran. The cargo was from Rosneft. Volgoneft-212 was carrying 4,900 tonnes, while Volgoneft-239 was carrying about 4,300 tonnes; according to iStories, both were transporting their cargo from Rostov-on-Don to the FIRN storage tanker, a part of the Russian shadow fleet, in the Kavkaz transshipment area in the mouth of the Black Sea.

The Kyiv Independent reported that in the days prior to the incident and as the storm began, both ships had tried several times to obtain authorisation to offload their cargo at an unnamed nearby port in Crimea.

There are differing reports as to the conditions the ships faced. According to unnamed Russian officials in Crimea on the day of the incident, the storm reached up to a seven on the Beaufort scale, with wind speeds up to 32 to 38 miles per hour (51 to 61 km/h). According to meteorologists at the Crimean State Hydrometeorological Service, wind speeds of about 60 miles per hour (97 km/h) were expected. Similarly, according to a Television News Service report on the day of the incident, waves reached a height of 3.5 metres (11 ft), with wind speeds of about 53 miles per hour (85 km/h).

One of the crew members of Volgoneft-212, Alexander Marchenko, told Izvestia that he did not find any issues with the ship on his morning rounds, but remarked that there had been strong waves. Later that day, an alarm was sounded, with the ship splitting in two about 5 miles (8 km) from shore after it was hit by a large wave. Its bow sank and one crew member died of hypothermia. The majority of its cargo was spilled. Soon after Volgoneft-212 was damaged, Volgoneft-239 sustained damage and lost power, drifting for several hours until she ran aground about 80 metres (260 ft) from shore near the Port of Taman.

Two rescue tugboats were sent from Kerch, while two Mil Mi-8 helicopters and over 50 people were deployed to assist in the rescue efforts. The rescue efforts were complicated due to the darkness and the storm, though the remaining crew members of Volgoneft-212 were rescued, at least eight of which had to be rescued from the water. 11 crew members were hospitalised, two of which were treated for hypothermia.

Efforts to rescue the crew of Volgoneft-239 were temporarily suspended due to inclement weather, with the ship having all necessary means to ensure the safety of the crew, though rescuers maintained contact with the ship. Rescue efforts were resumed the following day, rescuing the entire crew.

=== Nearby incidents ===
Volgoneft-109, a Project 550A Volgoneft tanker that was built in 1973 with a capacity of 4,700 summer deadweight, was carrying about 4,000 tonnes of mazut, and was anchored near Port Kavkaz in the Kerch Strait when she broadcast a distress signal early on 17 December. The captain reported an internal crack in a cargo tank which was leaking its cargo into a ballast tank. The crew remained aboard and was towed by a salvage vessel, with a spokesperson from the Federal Agency for Sea and Inland Water Transport stating that "The water tightness of the hull itself is not compromised, there is no leakage into the sea." It was later noted by Meduza and iStories that Volgoneft-109 was also likely transporting for FIRN. Volgoneft-109, like Volgoneft-212, was sailing using expired documents.

== Aftermath ==
This incident was, according to the Russian Ministry of Transport, the first spillage of mazut. Due to its density being roughly the same as water and its solidification temperature being 25 °C (77 °F), mazut either sinks to the seabed or remains suspended below the surface. As the oil sinks, it poisons animals, molluscs and plankton. Oil that either rises to the surface or remains suspended just below it covers birds in oil, poisoning them. Dmitry Lisitsyn, an environmentalist who has been designated a foreign agent in Russia, stated that the incident will worsen in summer, where the fuel that remains will release more toxic fumes.

According to the ministry, "The world has no proven methods for removing it from the water column, which is why the main approach is to collect it from the shoreline when it washes up in coastal areas." It was later labelled by Viktor Danilov-Danilyan, head of the Water Problems Institute of the Russian Academy of Sciences and ex-minister of the Ministry of Natural Resources and Environment, the "worst ecological disaster of the 21st century".

Alexander Kozlov, Minister for the Ministry of Natural Resources and Environment, in a call with President Vladimir Putin on 23 January, stated that he hoped Black Sea coastal beaches would be cleared of oil by mid-2025, though he believed the rest of the Russian Black Sea coast would not recover from the spill until May 2026.

Despite earlier estimates based on the testimony of one of the captains stating that about 3,700 tonnes of oil had been spilled, later estimates given by the Ministry of Transport on 2 January 2025 stated that about 2,400 tonnes had spilled. BBC Verify gave an estimate on 24 January stating that 5,000 tonnes had been spilled.

Pumping of the remaining mazut from the sunken tankers had not begun as of 1 June, with officials stating that the installation of three watertight barrels to prevent further leaks would not be conducted until October 2025. The Russian government announced that it had collected 181,500 tonnes of polluted materials on the shoreline as of 20 September 2025, that it had completed clean-up operations on the seabed, from which over 2,000 tonnes of polluted materials had been collected. Works underwater were still ongoing as of that date.

=== Clean-up efforts ===
Putin ordered the government to create a group to coordinate the rescue efforts and attempt to mitigate the ecological effects after meeting with the ministers of Emergency Situations and Natural Resources and Environment, Alexander Kurenkov and Kozlov respectively. He further appointed Deputy Prime Minister Vitaly Savelyev to head a task force aimed at mitigating the damage to the environment.

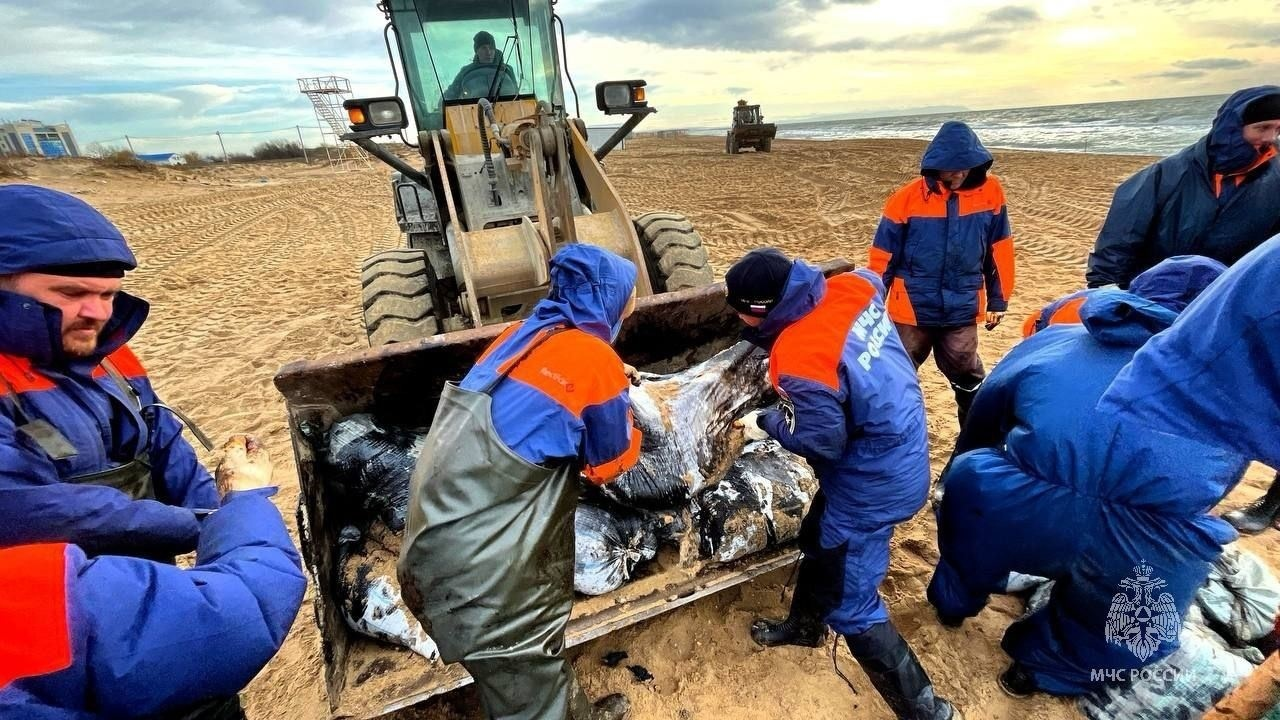
Ministry of Emergency Situations personnel removing contaminated sand from a beach

Svetlana Radionova, head of Rosprirodnadzor, arrived in Krasnodar Krai on 16 December. She said that specialists were assessing the site; teams from the Marine Rescue Service and the Ministry of Emergency Situations were also dispatched to attempt to mitigate the environmental effects. The Federal Agency for Fishery stated that "After the weather normalizes and disaster relief efforts are completed, an assessment of the damage to marine life will be given." It was discovered that Vologneft-239 had also begun leaking oil, though some of the fuel containers on both ships were still intact. The oil from the ships began drifting towards the coast north west of the Port of Taman, Krasnodar Krai, between the Tuzla Spit and Cape Panagiya, though as of that afternoon it had not reached the shoreline.

Reports of patches of oil building up on the coastline began on 17 December, with about 37 miles (60 km) of coastline between the Crimean Bridge and Anapa becoming polluted. A state of emergency was later declared in both the Anapsky and Temryuksky Districts. Oil accumulated on the shore between the villages of Veselovka, Blagoveshchenskaya, and Vityazevo. This stretch of coast is a narrow coastal spit, which separates a set of saltwater lagoons from the Black Sea.

That day, Kondratyev said "There are currently 267 people working on site from emergency services, with 50 units of equipment involved. If necessary, we will increase the number of forces and resources," though other estimates placed the number at 500 volunteers. According to satellite imagery, Volgoneft-239 was still aground and was slowly breaking apart as of 17 December. The number of volunteers rose to about 4,000 by 18 December, alongside about 1,500 rescue workers and officials by 19 December. Sergey Stranichny, a senior marine scientist, stated that satellite monitoring up to 18 December had shown that the cargo of Volgoneft-212 was still leaking, noting that strong winds were spreading it to the east. Clean-up efforts were hindered by the ongoing storm.

It was reported by Kozlov that, by 23 December, up to 200,000 tonnes of sand may have become polluted. A regional state of emergency was declared in Krasnodar Krai on 25 December. By at least the following day, patches of oil were found on the southern coast of Crimea; a federal state of emergency was declared by President Putin, allowing for further resources to be provided by the government. By 28 December a state of emergency was also declared in Crimea, with oil being discovered near Tobechytske Lake, a salt lake in the south-eastern area of the Kerch Peninsula.

==== 2025 ====
A small oil slick was found near the shores of Sevastopol on the south western coast of Crimea on 3 January, approximately 155 miles (249 kilometres) from the Kerch Strait; a regional emergency was declared on 4 January by Mikhail Razvozhaev, the regional governor, after four patches of oil were found on beaches in the area. On 7 January, small oil slicks were discovered near Yevpatoria, a city approximately 39 miles (63 kilometres) north of Sevastopol. By the following day, "at least" 287 tonnes of polluted materials had been collected in Crimea and around Sevastopol.

Dmytro Pletenchuk, a spokesperson for the Ukrainian Navy, warned on 9 January that the oil spill could reach the coasts of Odesa and Mykolaiv Oblasts. That same day, Putin ordered that a national response team be created while chastising regional officials for not doing enough to mitigate the effects of the incident.

While investigating the stern portion of Volgoneft-239 the following day, specialists discovered an oil slick of about 1.1 square miles (2.8 square kilometres) on the shoreline. Seven new slicks were also discovered, including on the coasts of four Crimean raions and on Tuzla Island. Some time prior to these discoveries, a road was built to better access the ship. Satellite imagery from 10 January showed two oil slicks in the Kerch Strait, one of which was 15 miles (24 kilometres) while the other was 3.5 miles (5.6 kilometres) in length.

According to officials, as of 11 January there was an estimated 5,000 tonnes of oil still at the bottom of the sea. An oil slick of over 9 miles (14 kilometres) was found the following day on the Berdyansk Spit, south of the city of Berdiansk, Zaporizhzhia Oblast, about 109 miles (175 kilometres) north of the site of the initial spill. Another smaller slick was discovered on another spit further east. Satellite imagery later showed an oil slick of about 115 square miles (300 square kilometres) extending over almost 62 miles (100 kilometres) just south of the spit.

The government of Krasnodar Krai stated on 14 January that they would be building a 400 metre containment barrier around Volgoneft-239 to prevent further spills from the ship. That day, the Ukrainian Ministry of Environmental Protection and Natural Resources announced that an agreement had been signed between Ukraine, Romania and Bulgaria to jointly assist each-other in clean-up efforts in anticipation of fuel reaching their coasts.

Krasnodar Krai Minister of Health, Yevgeny Filippov, noted that between 15 December and 15 January, 146 people needed medical attention after working to remove polluted materials, three of which were hospitalised. The Maritime Executive noted that, despite providing little to no protection from exposure to both fumes from and petroleum itself, some of the victims used cloth masks and fabric gloves while cleaning the beaches instead of rubber protective clothing and respirators. Volunteers reported that the usage and availability of such protective equipment was varied. Marine Insight further noted that many of the victims had suffered chemical burns, nausea, headaches, breathing problems and a lingering taste of oil.

Despite concerns about pollutants in the water and the ongoing discovery and clean-up of polluted materials, Epiphany celebrations, where celebrants perform, among other things, winter swimming, was still hosted on 19 January along the coast of Anapa. Though officials had checked the water prior to the event, new oil slicks had been deposited onto the shore hours after the checks. That same day, workers began pumping oil from Volgoneft-239.

A spokesperson from Greenpeace stated to BBC Verify on 24 January that oil from the spill had spread across 154 square miles (400 square kilometres). That day, Ivan Rusev, head of the research department at the National Nature Park "Tuzlivski lymany", (Note: Facebook account of Ivan Rusev) reported that, following stormy weather, oil had been discovered near the Danube Biosphere Reserve and the Tuzly Lagoons National Nature Park, about 81 miles (130 kilometres) south west of Odesa. The Danube Biosphere Reserve is partly within the borders of both Ukraine and Romania. As of 29 January, areas of the Odesa coastline were starting to be cleaned, with new patches of oil found near Mykolaivka, about 5.5 miles (8.9 kilometres) north-east from the Tuzly Lagoons on 5 February.

Russian officials stated on 25 January that the remaining 1,488 tonnes of oil was removed from Volgoneft-239. The Kyiv Independent later reported that this did not include a separate underwater section of the ship. According to the report, the entirety of Volgoneft-212 and the sunken section of Volgoneft-239 were being "examined underwater", with no attempts to bring them to shore or remove their contents as of 2 February.

Danilov-Danilyan told Moskovsky Komsomolets on 2 February that soil samples collected while cleaning Anapa showed a content of benzopyrene 22.5 times the legal limit. Benzopyrene is a carcinogenic and toxic compound also found in coal tar and tobacco smoke.

Putin ordered an inspection into tanker companies by the Ministry of Transport on 5 February to ensure that the companies and the owners of ships under them were in compliance with regulations. The inspection, which the ministry aimed to complete in the following months, included about 500 companies.

In July 2025, the oil spill was reported to have reached the coast of Abkhazia, more than 350 kilometers southeast from the source of the spill.

=== Alexander Komin ===
A student at the Anapa Industrial College, Alexander Komin, died overnight on 15 January. Pro-Russian Telegram channels stated, without citing sources, that he had volunteered to remove polluted materials from the beach of Anapa and claimed that he had chronic asthma. The college claimed that the cause of death was unknown, however forensic pathologists were as of that date attempting to determine whether toxic fumes contributed to his death. Both the college and the Krasnodar Emergency Response Centre denied that he was a part of an organised group, stating that being a part of one of these groups was prohibited to minors.

Komin's mother, Elena Mamaeva, told Agentstvo on 4 February that the head of the college's law department, Sergey Savenko, had offered help with exams, internships and debt clearances to students 17 and older who volunteered in the clean-up efforts. He further stated that he would supervise the group. Mamaeva provided a voice recording sent to Komin by Savenko and screenshots of her conversation with her son as evidence, further stating that Komin was interested as it would fulfil his summer internship requirements that year. Mamaeva, as of that date, had not received Komin's autopsy results and believed that officials were attempting to cover up his death, stating that investigators were no longer responding to her and that state news channels would not report on the case.

=== Effects on wildlife ===
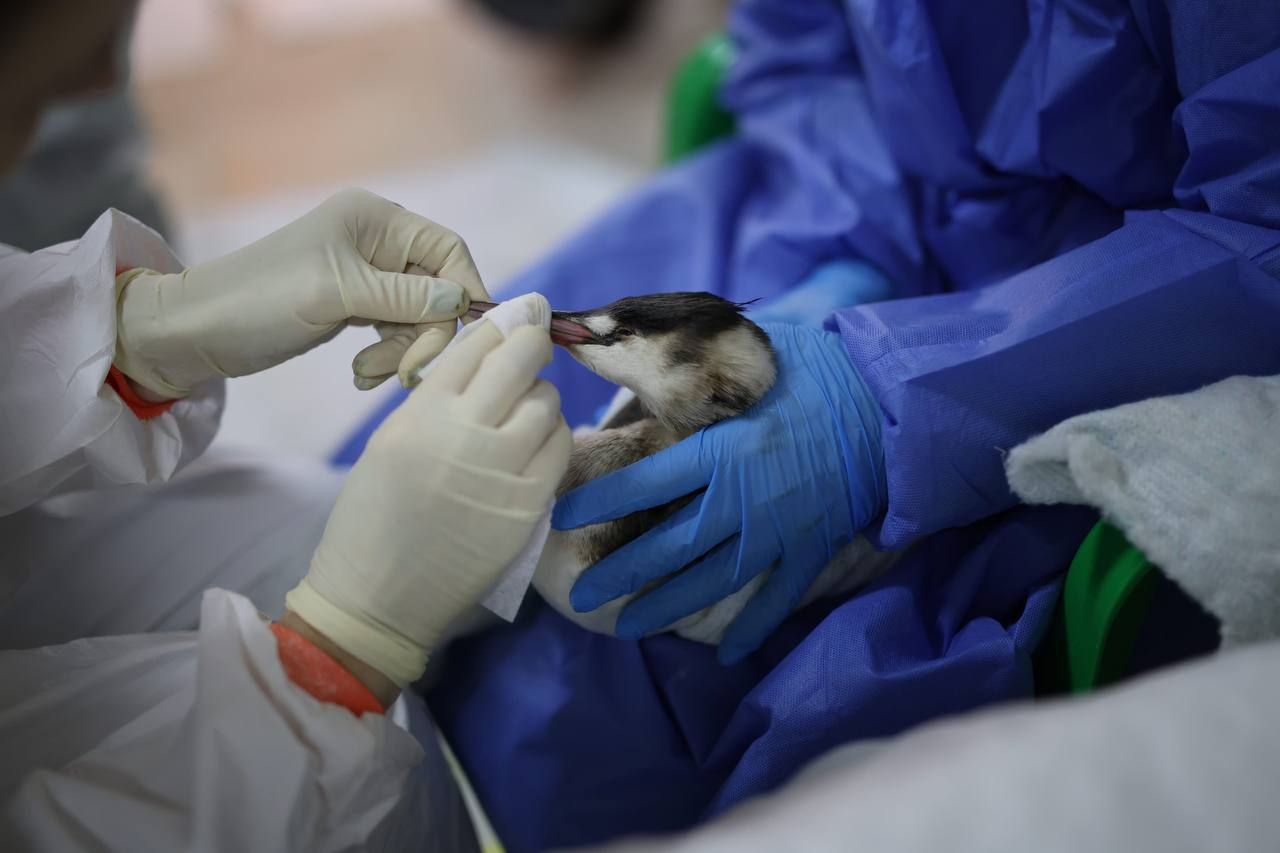
A bird being treated by volunteers after the oil spill

Reports of birds covered in oil, either dead or struggling to fly on the shoreline, started to come in on 17 December; while one such report was from Volna, a short distance east of the Port of Taman, another two were from a beach near Anapa and Vityazevo, about 30 miles (48 km) to the southeast.

Birds covered in oil have been found on Georgia's Black Sea coast. A rescue centre was opened in Vityazevo, with volunteers working to remove oil from affected birds and veterinarians deciding whether they should be released or moved elsewhere. An ornithologist who arrived at the centre on 24 December stated that "...with many of these birds, there's damage to the fatty layer coating their feathers. This layer prevents them from getting wet and freezing when they dive. If we release them now, they'll freeze. Of course, many can't fly properly anyway and would just die. We may need to wait until spring when the birds molt and grow new feathers."

About 5,550 birds had been rescued by 8 January, though Ukrainian biologist Ivan Rusev estimated that about 10% of the birds brought to rehabilitation centres survive. At the Pelikan Centre, a seabird rehabilitation centre in Russia, 175 of the 1,051 birds sent there had died as of that date. He further estimated that, by some time three weeks after the incident, the death count could be between 15,000 and 20,000, though he believed that that figure was "only the tip of the iceberg".

Rusev further reported on 7 February that, during a routine survey, approximately 5,000 jellyfish were found washed up along a two 1.24 miles (2.00 kilometres) stretch of coastline in Odesa Oblast, noting that there were more they were unable to count in shallow waters in the area.

Dmitry Glazov, a research associate at the Severtsov Institute of Ecology and Evolution, stated that the incident affected a "critical area" for dolphins in the Black Sea, believing that it could "impact the ecosystem for at least another 10 years, if not longer." By 5 January, 61 cetaceans had been found dead near Novorossiysk, Taman and Anapa. Of those, the Delfa Dolphin Rescue and Research Centre reported that, based on the condition of the bodies, 32 had been killed by the spill. The majority of them had been killed within the first 10 days, with a large portion of the bodies being that of Azov dolphins, an endangered subspecies of harbour porpoise. Delfa further reported that, between 5–11 January, another 28 dolphins were found dead as a result of the spill. A further 32 were found in Crimea and near Sevastopol. In June 2025, a white-sided dolphin was found dead in the area of the Tuzly Lagoons National Nature Park. At some point prior, a Black Sea harbour porpoise was found in Romania at the mouth of the Danube-Sulina river.

=== Economic effects ===
Nina Ostanina, head of the Russian State Duma Committee on Family Affairs, told Parlamentskaya Gazeta that bookings at children's recreation and health retreats in Anapa had dropped over 27% in January 2025 and 40% for that summer. Despite concerns over the levels of pollution and that Russian Black Sea coastal beaches would not be cleaned before mid-2025, regional authorities in Volgograd spent at least ₽16 million ($163,000) to send 160 orphans, disabled children and homeless children to Anapa. Plans for further contracts in the region suggests that officials aim to spend up to ₽26 million ($265,300) for similar trips. According to The Moscow Times, regional governments across Russia spent more than ₽300 million ($3 million) on similar trips to Black Sea resorts in the two weeks after the spill. The Federal Service for the Oversight of Consumer Protection and Welfare performed tests on sand and seawater in Anapa and Temryuk, releasing a warning on 19 April 2025 that 191 beaches in Anapa and nine in Temryuk had not met public health or hygiene safety standards and could not be used recreationally.

Despite a ban on swimming in these areas and mazut still being found in the water, tourists still visited the area, with both children and adults sunbathing and swimming. Three days prior to a report by The Moscow Times, one such tourist "came back from the beach covered in mazut. He went swimming and a slick drifted right into him." By July 2025, hotel occupancy rates were at 30% in Anapa, down from 75% in July 2024. Similarly, while 100,000 tourists visited Anapa in July 2024, 24,000 visited in July 2025.

According to Svitlana Hrynchuk, the Ukrainian Minister of Environmental Protection and Natural Resources, damage to the Black Sea ecosystem could be in excess of $14 billion. On 4 April 2025, the Federal Service for Supervision of Natural Resources of Russia said that the oil spill had resulted in environmental damages amounting to ₽84.9 billion ($1 billion).

== Criticism ==
The clean-up efforts have faced criticism. On 22 December, Delfa Dolphin Rescue and Research Centre reported that some of the bags used to collect sand polluted by oil were swept by the water into the Black Sea after they were left on the shore. Similarly, Danilov-Danilyan stated in a press conference that "There are no bulldozers there, no trucks. Practically no heavy machinery." and that volunteers have "shovels and useless plastic bags that rip apart [...] While the bags wait to finally be collected, storms arrive and they end up back in the sea. It's unthinkable!"

In an interview with RBC, he further stated "At the very least, they should not have been using vessels that should have been written off 20 years ago. In principle, river-sea vessels should not be released for winter sea navigation. It is impossible to avoid catastrophic consequences with such an attitude — sooner or later it would have occurred. And serious work to eliminate the consequences began only on the ninth or 10th day after the accident."

One volunteer who left for Anapa to help with the clean-up on 23 December criticized the disorganisation of the efforts, saying "Right now, people are collecting contaminated sand and moving it in bags from one place, where it poisons the soil, to another, where it still poisons the soil. For example, in Voskresenskaya, trucks just dumped bags outside town, not far from people's homes. I also read that they dumped bags near the town of Primorsky, leaving them near the Tamano-Zaporozhsky Nature Reserve, where different kinds of birds spend the winter." The same volunteer also stated that, at Vityazevo, there was only volunteers cleaning up the beach. Similarly, another volunteer said "When we got to the beach [at Dzhemete], there were no emergency service workers. Later, we saw officials giving interviews in front of the volunteers at work, which was very frustrating. They could have at least had the decency to pick up a shovel and help us."

During a cabinet meeting on 9 January, President Putin criticised the coordination between regional and federal organisations and criticised the "inadequate response" from the Ministry of Emergency Situations, saying "From what I see and from the information I receive, I conclude that everything being done to minimise the damage is clearly not enough yet." As a result, he requested a detailed report from Kurenkov on the incident as of that date and steps to be taken to mitigate the impact of the spill. A spokesperson from the Ukrainian Ministry of Foreign Affairs, Heorhii Tykhyy, called Putin's concern performative, saying "Only after the scale of the disaster became too obvious to conceal its horrific consequences did Russia begin to show its so-called 'concern.' The accidents involving the tankers Volgoneft-212 and Volgoneft-239 in the Kerch Strait, caused by the use of outdated vessels, confirm Russia's inability to adhere to maritime safety standards."

On 24 January, the Ukrainian government called on the International Maritime Organization (IMO) to perform an independent investigation into the handling of the incident by Russian authorities both before and during the clean-up efforts. The filing with the IMO claimed "[that t]he Russian authorities initially concealed the environmental impact of the incident on the Black Sea region", further stating that the ships involved were sailing in unsuitable weather conditions in "gross violation of the fundamental principles of safety". Oleksiy Kuleba, deputy prime minister for rebuilding Ukraine, further called on the IMO to increase sanctions against the Russian shadow fleet.

DW News reported on 26 January that a number of volunteers believed that they were doing the majority of the clean-up work, not government organisations, believing that government representatives only hindered their work. In a January ministerial meeting, Putin called upon officials to become more active in assisting clean-up efforts. In early January, as a part of one of these efforts, employees from the Ministry of Natural Resources and Environment released 160 birds without consulting local volunteers. One volunteer called it a PR stunt, with nearly all of the birds being found dead on the coast within a day; experts stated that the natural insulation on the birds' feathers had not had enough of a chance to recover.

According to The Moscow Times, volunteers have also reported feeling as if there were barriers or as if they were oppressed by regional authorities and emergency response agencies. In mid-January, police formally warned Yana Antonova for "engag[ing] in volunteer activities related to animal rescue [...and...] actively encourag[ing] citizens to [attend] mass gatherings in order to draw attention to the problem". She denied this, posting the warning on social media and saying she only actively commented on videos featuring local authorities.

In a video posted on 1 June 2025, around 100 residents of Anapa gathered to criticize the government's response to the oil spill, stating "Pumping of fuel oil from sunken tankers has not yet begun [...] Any sane person should understand that the leak will increase with the onset of heat." and that the government's plan to install three watertight barrels around the sunken tankers in October 2025 would lead to "a much larger disaster than in December". They called the deadline for the clean-up of February 2026 unacceptable, accusing the government of misusing funds designated for it.

== Investigation ==
Separate criminal cases were opened by the Investigative Committee (IC) for each ship. Both were initially opened due to potential breaches of maritime safety regulations, though the case involving Volgoneft-212 was later expanded to include charges relating to negligent homicide due to the death of a crew member.

At a press conference, President Putin said "Law enforcement bodies will give an assessment of the actions of the ships’ captains. I was informed that the captains violated regulations by not taking shelter in time. Some ships did take shelter, and they are fine. And these ones did not. Moreover, they anchored where they shouldn't have." On 18 December both captains were charged; the following day, the captain of Volgoneft-212 was placed under investigative custody for two months, while the captain of Volgoneft-239 was placed under house arrest for two months on suspicion of breaching maritime safety regulations.

According to Dmitry Zatsarinsky, a lawyer in Russia, the investigation could last between several months and more than a year, with the potential for sentencing being up to five years imprisonment or correctional labour for violating maritime safety regulations.

Kama Shipping, the operator of Volgoneft-212, was found guilty of violating maritime classification documents on 3 March 2025, and was fined ₽30,000 (~$215).

The Prosecutor General of Ukraine filed court documents to prosecute one of the captain's of the ships involved in the spill in June 2025.

== Related events ==
Volgotransneft received six ships from Volga-Bunker in a deal which finished on 23 June 2022: the 4,190 deadweight tonnage (dwt) Volgoneft-164, Volgoneft-208 and Volgoneft-219, all of which were built in 1970; the 5,900 dwt Volgoneft-206, which was built in 1969; the 4,200 dwt Volgoneft-246, which was built in 1975; and the 3,475 gross tonnage (gt) Volgoneft-264, which was built in 1978.

Following a failure to pay for the deal, Volga-Bunker began court proceedings seeking ₽6.5 million ($63,000) from Volgatransneft. Lawyers from Volgotransneft failed to attend a hearing at the Moscow Arbitration Court in January 2024, leading the court to rule against them, ordering them to pay the owed amount. Volgotransneft failed to comply, leading Volga-Bunker to file a demand in the same court for Volgotransneft to be declared bankrupt.

According to an investigation by iStories, in the last months of 2024 and January 2025, at least 44 Volgonefts unloaded their cargo at Port Kavkaz, with 11 continuing to sail despite being in conditions their certifications prohibited, at least seven also chose the same route that Volgoneft-212 and Volgoneft-239 took. Half of the ships that travelled during this period were over 50 years old, with a range of 42–58.

=== Lawsuits ===
The Maritime Rescue Service filed suit in the Krasnodar Krai Arbitration Court against Volgatransneft, Kama Shipping and KamaTransOil on 9 January 2025 with the aim of recovering expenses. The Novorossiysk Transport Prosecutor's Office filed three suits against Volgotransneft and a complaint against Kama Shipping for administrative responsibility in the same court the following day for administrative liability. The suit against Kama Shipping and KamaTransOil was taken up in August 2025, with the companies being ordered to pay ₽49.46 billion ($621 million) as compensation for the environmental damage caused to the Kerch Strait, along with an additional ₽404.3 million ($5.07 million) to be paid to the Maritime Rescue Service.

Anapa filed suit against Volgotransneft and Kama Shipping in the Krasnodar Krai Arbitration Court in mid-March, stating that the town had spent ₽211 million ($2.4 million) on the clean-up efforts. They sued for that amount, though further stated that the figure was not final and that the administration of the town intended to increase their claim in the future.

On 22 August 2025, the Krasnodar Krai Arbitration Court froze the assets of KamaTransOil and Kama Shipping following a request from Rosprirodnadzor.
