= Volgoneft =

Series of Soviet-designed oil tankers

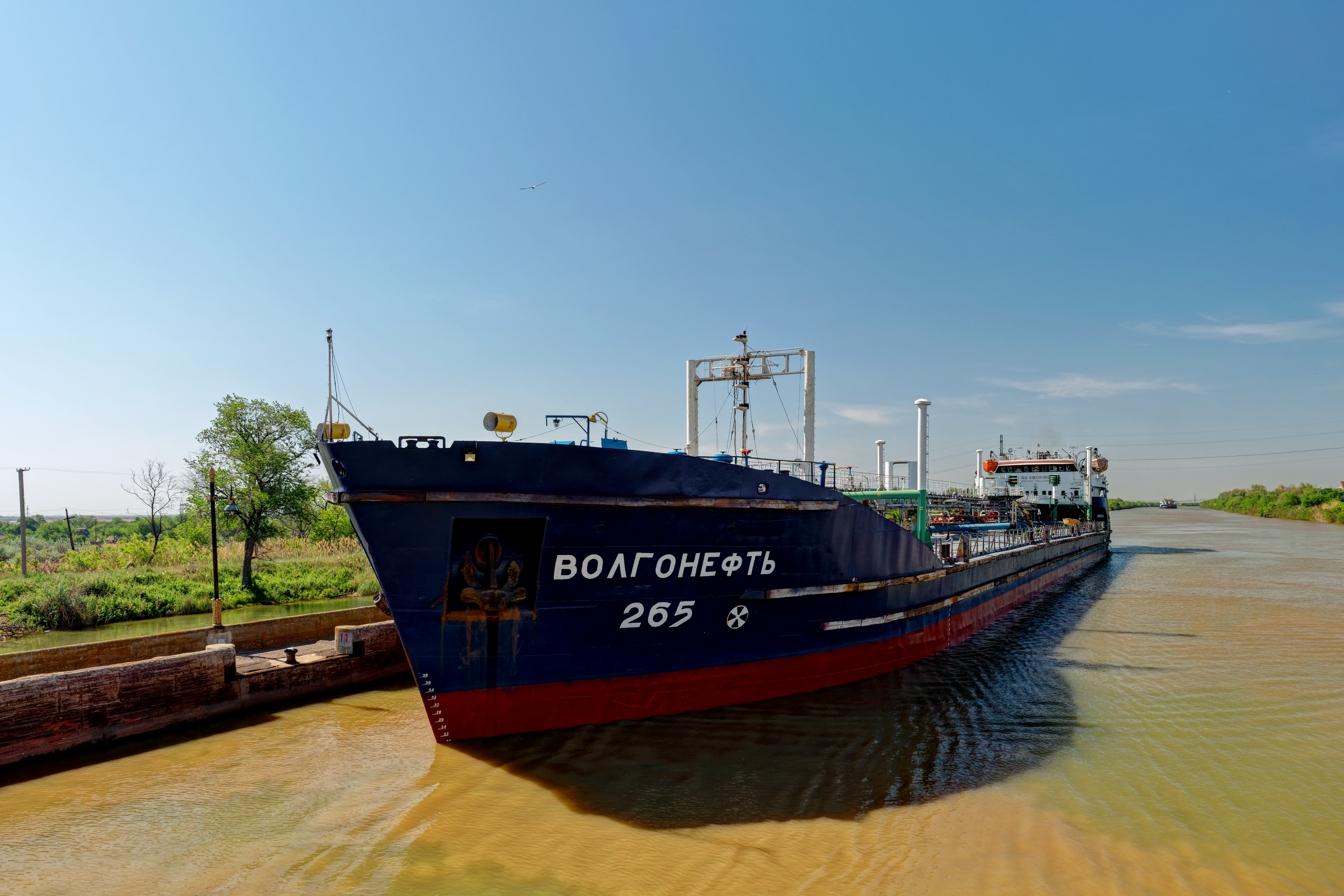
Project 1577 tanker Volgoneft-265 on the Volga–Don Canal near Volgograd in 2018

Volgoneft (Russian: Волгонефть) is a series of oil tankers that was designed in the Soviet Union for the Volgotanker shipping company. Ships of this series were built from the 1960s to the 1990s. They were designed as "mixed navigation vessels": primarily for use on the large canals and navigable rivers of European Russia, but also capable of short-sea shipping in favourable sea conditions, with waves no more than 2 metres (6 ft 7 in) high.

There are five classes in the Volgoneft series. In chronological order, they are Project 558; Project 550; Project 1577; Project 550A; and Project 630. Many Volgoneft tankers have been scrapped, or have been converted into barges or lighters for bunkering. However, others continue to be used as river and short-sea tankers. Volgotanker has sold some of its Volgoneft tankers to various other operators; some of them outside Russia.

Three Volgoneft tankers have broken in two in heavy seas, spilling their cargo: Volgoneft-248 in 1999; Volgoneft-139 in 2007 and Volgoneft-212 in 2024. Also in 2024, Volgoneft-239 was damaged in a storm and ran aground, although without breaking in two.

== Shared characteristics ==
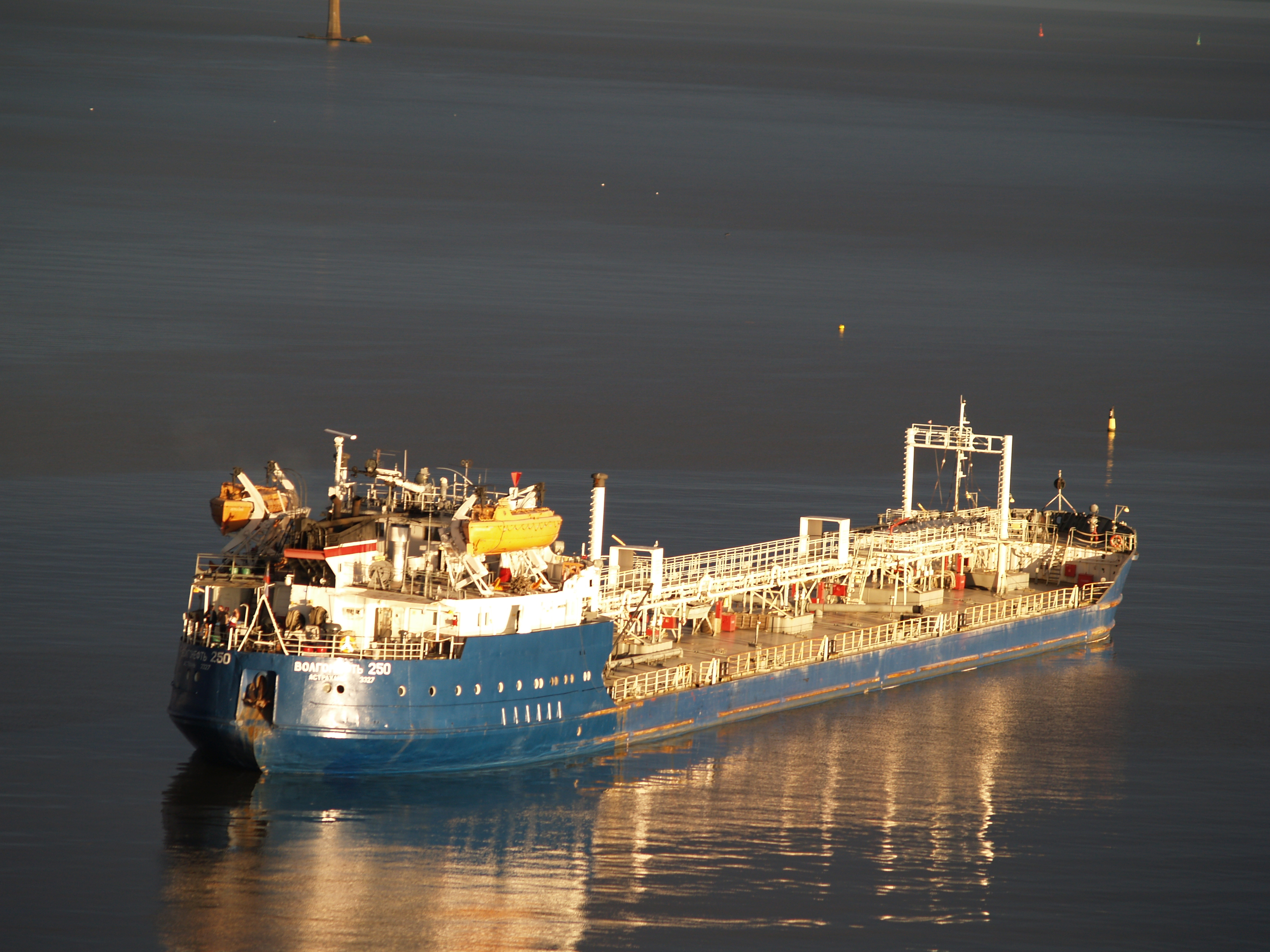
Project 1577 tanker Volgoneft-250 in 2009

Each Volgoneft tanker has a double hull, with a forecastle and poop. She has twin fixed-pitch screws, twin diesel engines, and twin balanced rudders. Her engines are aft, along with her superstructure and her bridge.

All Volgoneft tankers are designed to fit through the locks of the Volga–Don Canal. Projects 550, 1577, and 550A all have the same dimensions: 132.6 m (435 ft) length; 16.9 m (55 ft) beam; and 5.5 m (18 ft) depth. Project 630 is slightly larger: 137.81 m (452.1 ft) length; 17 m (56 ft) beam; and 6.4 m (21 ft) depth.

Projects 550, 1577, and 550A all have a pair of 8NVD48AU diesel engines, made by VEB Schwermaschinenbau „Karl Liebknecht“ (SKL) in Magdeburg, East Germany. Each 8NVD48AU engine is rated at 736 kW. Project 630 uses a pair of DGR2A150/750 diesel engines, each of which is rated at 882 kW.

== Names ==
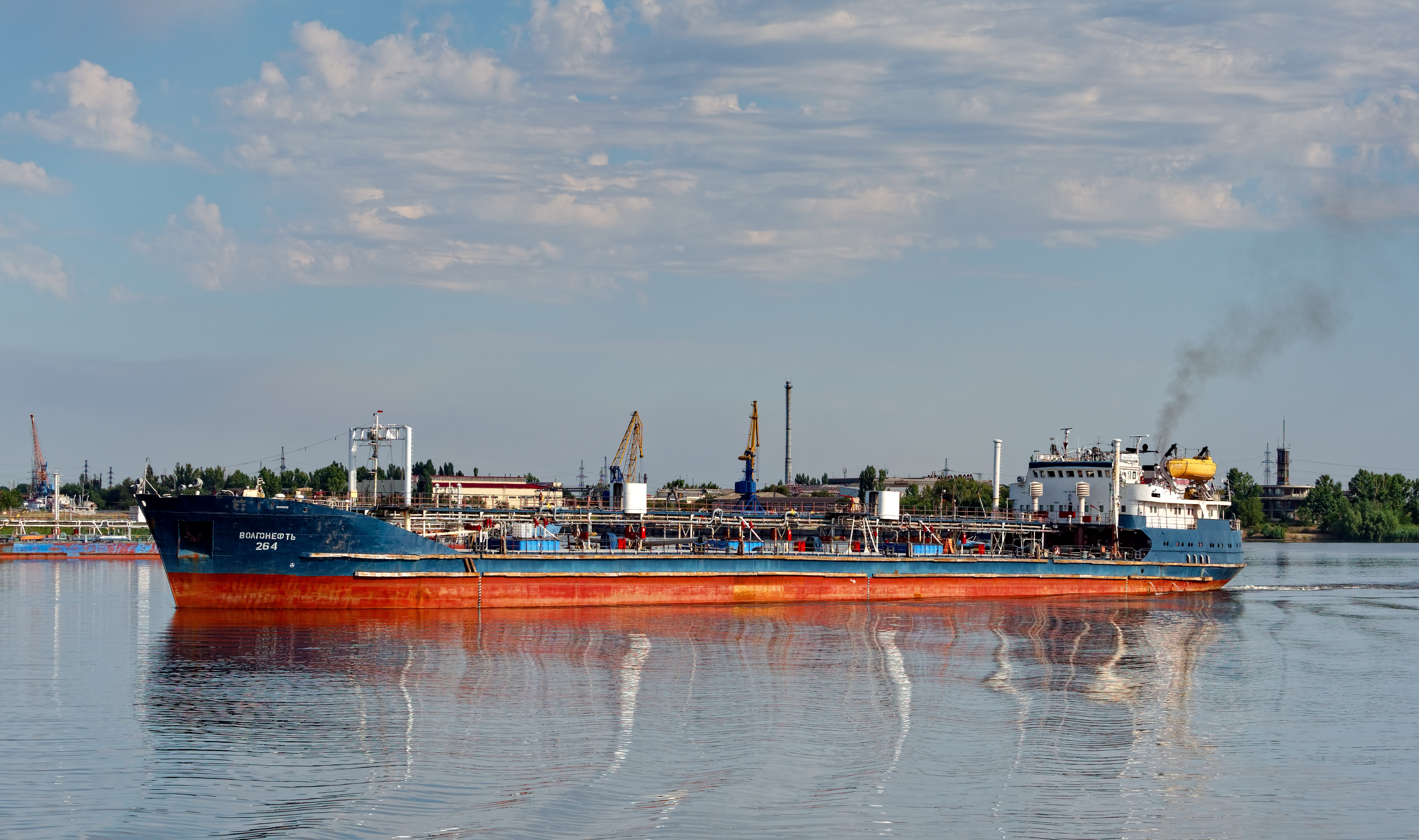
Project 1577 tanker Volgoneft-264 in 2017

"Volgoneft" is a blend word, combining the name of the river Volga (Волга) with "neft" (нефть), the Russian word for "oil". The original name of most of the ships in the series was "Volgoneft-" followed by a number. Production of Projects 558, 550, 1577, and 550A overlapped for several years. "Volgoneft-" names were originally allocated in small, sequential blocks: four to Project 550; seven to Project 558; two to Project 1577; six to Project 550; and so on. As a result, each Project had ships in several numerically separate sequences of "Volgoneft-" names.

In 1973, nearly every tanker built thus far was renamed, in order to group ships of each Project into one continuous sequence of names. The "Volgoneft-" part was kept, but the number was changed. Project 550 ships were renamed in the sequence Volgoneft-21 to Volgoneft-45. Project 558 ships were renamed in the sequence Volgoneft-46 to Volgoneft-80. Project 550A ships were renamed in the sequence Volgoneft-101 to Volgoneft-165. Project 1577 ships were renamed Volgoneft-201 onwards, but with a few single gaps. As a result of the renaming, many of the names between Volgoneft-21 and Volgoneft-103, inclusive, have been used twice: for one ship before 1973, and another ship after.

== Project 558 ==
Project 558 tankers were built between 1963 and 1968. 35 were built; all at the Krasnoarmeyskaya Shipyard (later Volgograd Shipyard) in Volgograd. The first five ships of the Project were completed in 1963 and 1964 as Velikiy (Великий); Bystriy (Быстрый); Besstrashniy (Бесстрашный); Vazhniy (Важный); and Bezuprechniy (Безупречный), meaning "Great"; "Quick"; "Fearless"; "Important"; and "Flawless" respectively. The remaining ships of the Project were originally named in two continuous sequences: from Volgoneft-9 to Volgoneft-32, and from Volgoneft-37 to Volgoneft-43.

In 1965, Bystriy; Besstrashniy; Bezuprechniy; and Vazhniy were renamed Volgoneft-2; Volgoneft-3; Volgoneft-4; and Volgoneft-5 respectively. In the 1973 renaming, all Project 558 tankers except Velikiy were renamed in one continuous series from Volgoneft-46 to Volgoneft-80. Before 1973, most of these names had been applied to ships of Project 550 or Project 1577.

Some ships of the Project have since been renamed again. Several of their new names reflect their conversion into bunkering barges or lighters. Bunkerbaza-11 and Bunkerbaza-12 (Бункербаза-11 and Бункербаза-12) mean "Bunker Base-11" and "Bunker Base-12". Bunkerovochnaya yomkost-48, -49, and -64 (Бункеровочная ёмкость-48, -49, and -64) mean "Bunkering Tank-48", "-49", and "-64". Volgoneft-57; Volgoneft-79; and Volgoneft-80 (post-1973 names) were converted into non-propelled oil pumping units, and renamed NPS-57; NPS-79; and NPS-80 (НПС-57; НПС-79; and НПС-80). Volgoneft-62 and Volgoneft-65 (post-1973 names) have been converted into non-propelled "sweeping stations", and renamed NZS-62 and NZS-65 (НЗС-62 and НЗС-65).

23 Project 558 tankers have been scrapped. Volgoneft-63 (formerly Volgoneft-13) and Volgoneft-77 (formerly Volgoneft-31) were scrapped in February 1975. Other ships of the Project were scrapped from 1985 onwards.

As of 2024, three Project 558 ships remain in service as tankers: yard numbers 780; 784; and 792. 780 was built in May 1966 as Volgoneft-24, and in 1973 was renamed Volgoneft-53. 784 was built in September 1966 as Volgoneft-28, and in 1973 was renamed Volgoneft-28. In 2021 she was renamed Prikamye, (Прикамье), after the Prikamye region around the Kama river. 792 was built in 1967 as Volgoneft-40, and in 1973 was renamed Volgoneft-58. She was renamed Orion-1 (Орион-1) in 1994, which was shortened to Orion (Орион) some time before 2011.

== Project 550 ==
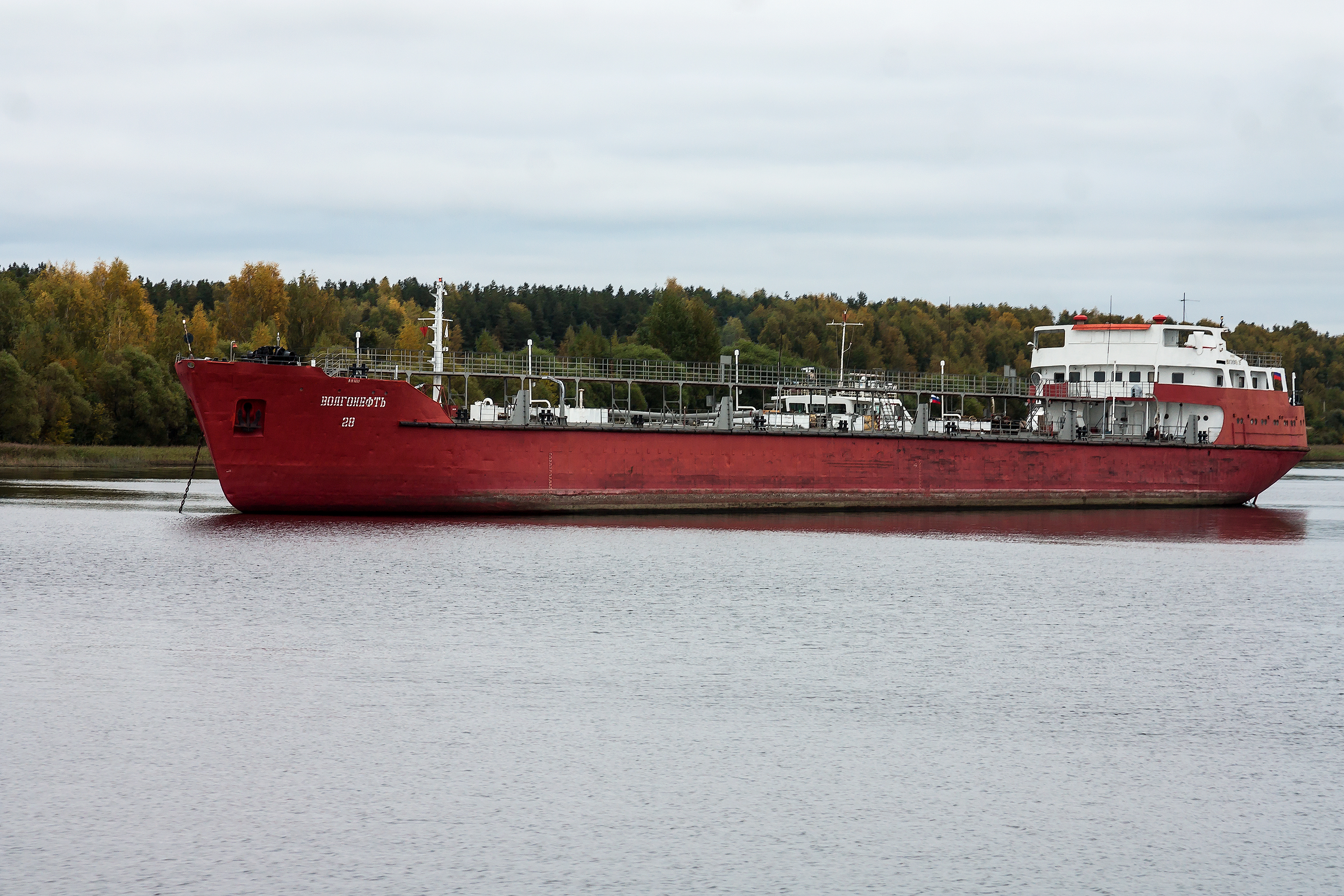
Project 550 tanker Volgoneft-28 anchored in the Volga at Yaroslavl in 2017. She was built in 1973 as Volgoneft-46.

Project 550 tankers were built between 1966 and 1970. 25 were built; all at the Dimotrov Shipyard in Varna, Bulgaria. The first three ships of the Project were completed in 1966 and 1967 as Nadyozhniy (Надёжный); Druzhniy (Дружный); and Verniy (Верный), meaning "Reliable"; "Friendly"; and "Faithful" respectively. The remainder were given names in four short series: from Volgoneft-34 to Volgoneft-36; Volgoneft-46 to Volgoneft-51; Volgoneft-58 to Volgoneft-63; and Volgoneft-70 to Volgoneft-75.

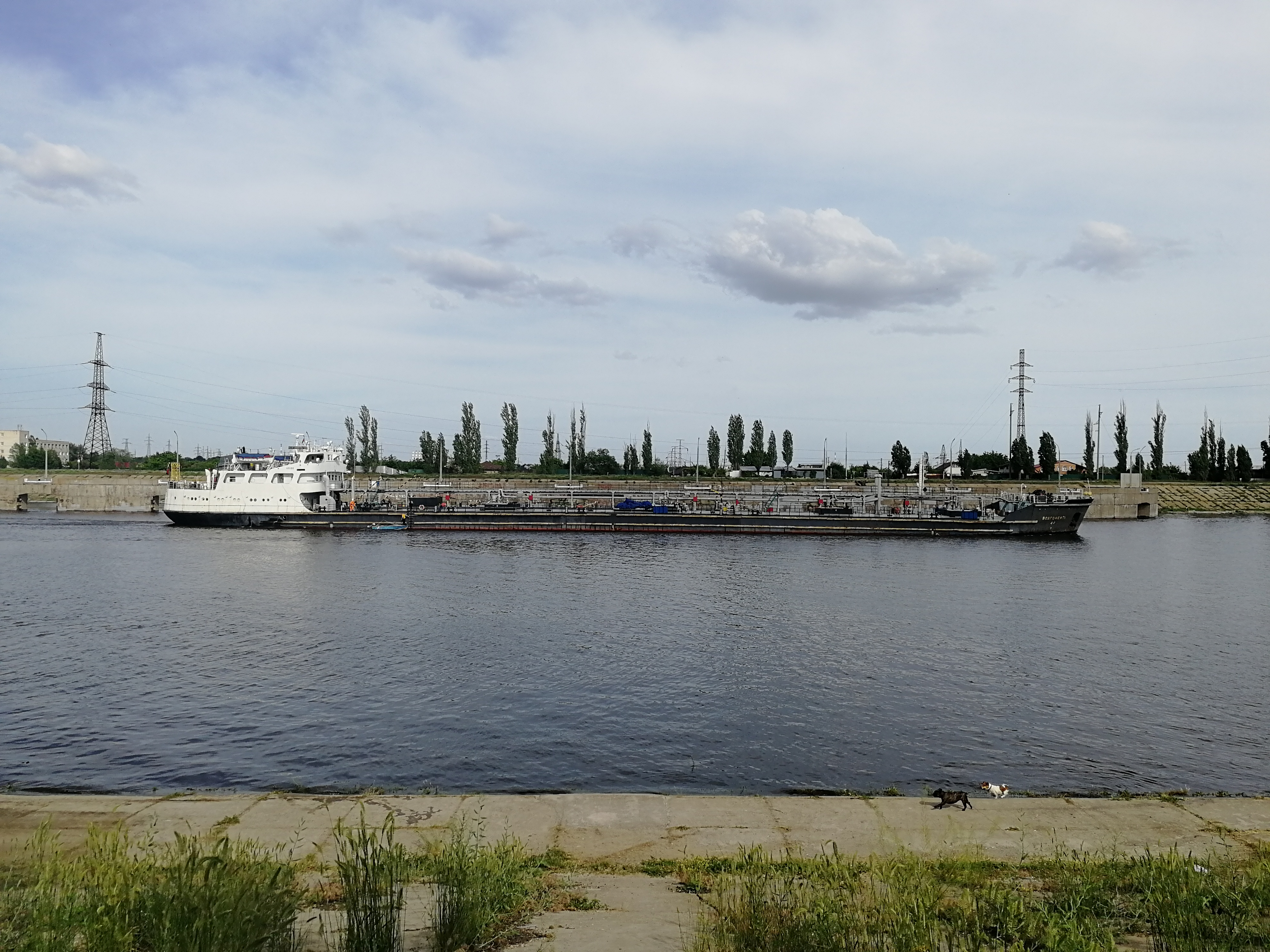
Project 550 tanker Volgoneft-44 at Volzhsky, Volgograd Oblast in 2020. She was built in 1970 as Volgoneft-74.

In the 1973 renaming, all Project 550 tankers except Nadyozhniy were renamed into one continuous series from Volgoneft-22 to Volgoneft-44. 19 ships of the Project received names previously applied to Project 558 tankers. Also, four names in the series have been borne by two different ships of Project 550: one before 1973, and one after. The original Volgoneft-33; Volgoneft-34; Volgoneft-35; and Volgoneft-36 became Volgoneft-24; Volgoneft-25; and Volgoneft-26 and Volgoneft-27 respectively. Meanwhile, the original Volgoneft-51; Volgoneft-58; Volgoneft-59; and Volgoneft-60 became Volgoneft-33; Volgoneft-34; Volgoneft-35; and Volgoneft-36 respectively.

Nadyozhniy kept her original name until 1987, when she became Volgoneft-21. In 2014, Volgoneft-22 was renamed Kapitan Salnikov (Капитан Сальников). Volgoneft-28 (formerly Volgoneft-46) has been converted into a bunkering lighter, and in 2018 she was renamed Bunkerbaza-28 (Бункербаза-28, meaning "Bunker Base 28").

13 Project 550 tankers have been scrapped, starting with Volgoneft-27 (formerly Volgoneft-36) in November 1986. Others are out of service, or have been converted into bunkering barges or lighters. Six remain in service: Volgoneft-32 (formerly Volgoneft-50); Volgoneft-33 (formerly Volgoneft-51); Volgoneft-37 (formerly Volgoneft-61); Volgoneft-39 (formerly Volgoneft-63); and Volgoneft-44 (formerly Volgoneft-74).

== Project 1577 ==
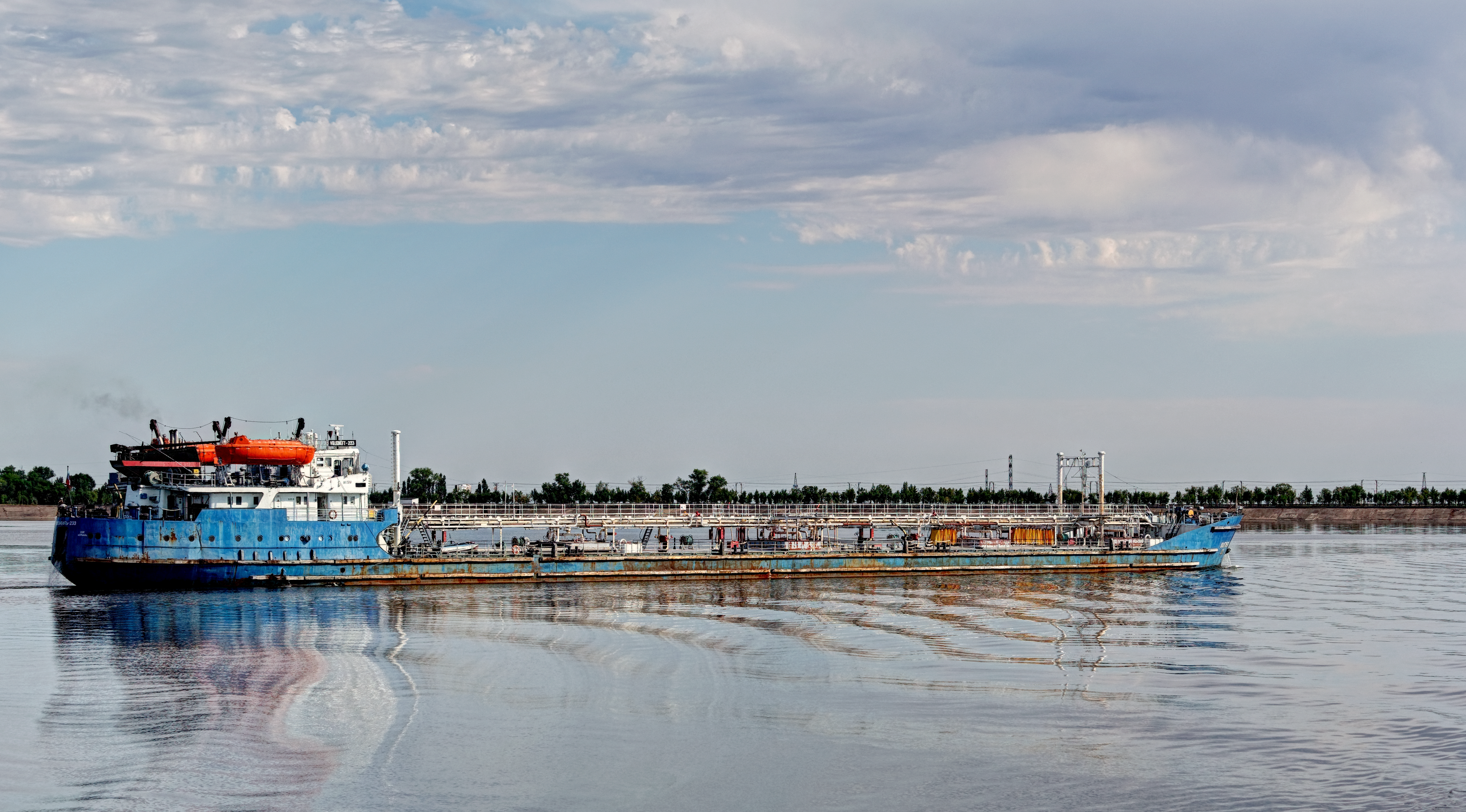
Project 1577 tanker Volgoneft-233 on the Volga in 2017. She was built in 1972 as Volgoneft-102M.

Project 1577 tankers were built between 1967 and 1979. 44 were built, all at the Volgograd Shipyard in Volgograd. The first two, completed in 1967 and 1968, were named Volgoneft-44M and Volgoneft-45M. The next six were named in a short series from Volgoneft-52 to Volgoneft-57 inclusive. In 1969, Volgoneft-53 to Volgoneft-57 became Volgoneft-53M to Volgoneft-57M. Volgoneft-52 did not receive an "M" suffix, and in 1972 was renamed 50 let YaASSR (50 лет ЯАССР, meaning "50th year of the Yakut Autonomous Soviet Socialist Republic". Between 1969 and 1973, further ships of Project 1577 were completed as Volgoneft-64M to Volgoneft-69M; Volgoneft-76M to Volgoneft-82M; Volgoneft-86M to Volgoneft-92M; and Volgoneft-97M to Volgoneft-103M. In 1971, Volgoneft-80M was renamed Komsomol Volgograda (Комсомол Волгограда).

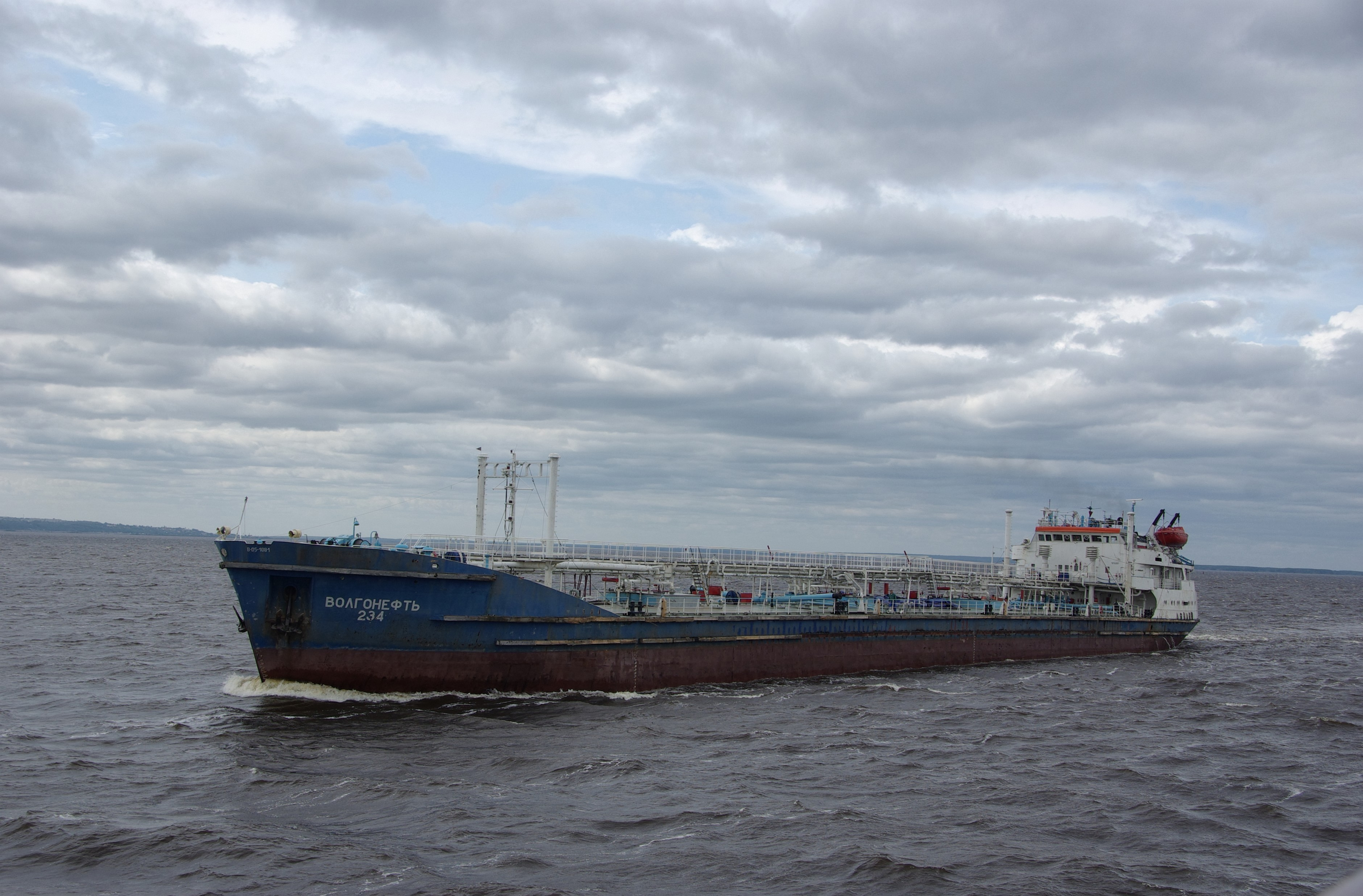
Project 1577 tanker Volgoneft-234 at sea in 2017. She was built in 1973 as Volgoneft-103M.

In the 1973 renaming, Project 1577 tankers that still had "Volgoneft-" names were renamed in two continuous series: from Volgoneft-201 to Volgoneft-212; and from Volgoneft-214 to Volgoneft-234. The name Volgoneft-213 seems not to have been used. Project 1577 tankers built after the 1973 renaming were given names in the series Volgoneft-235 to Volgoneft-256; and Volgoneft-258 to Volgoneft-270. The ship that was to be named Volgoneft-257 was instead completed as 60 let Oktyabrya (60 лет Октября), commemorating the 60th anniversary of the October Revolution.

Numerous Project 1577 tankers have since been renamed. In 1978, Volgoneft-258 was renamed Sovetskaya Yakutiya (Советская Якутия), after the Yakut Autonomous Soviet Socialist Republic. In 1985, 50 let YaASSR was renamed Kapitan Taratorin (Капитан Тараторин). In 1993 Volgoneft-201, the lead ship of Project 1577, was renamed Valaams (Валаамс). In 1994, 60 let Oktyabrya was renamed Kapitan Krasnoshtanov (Капитан Красноштанов).

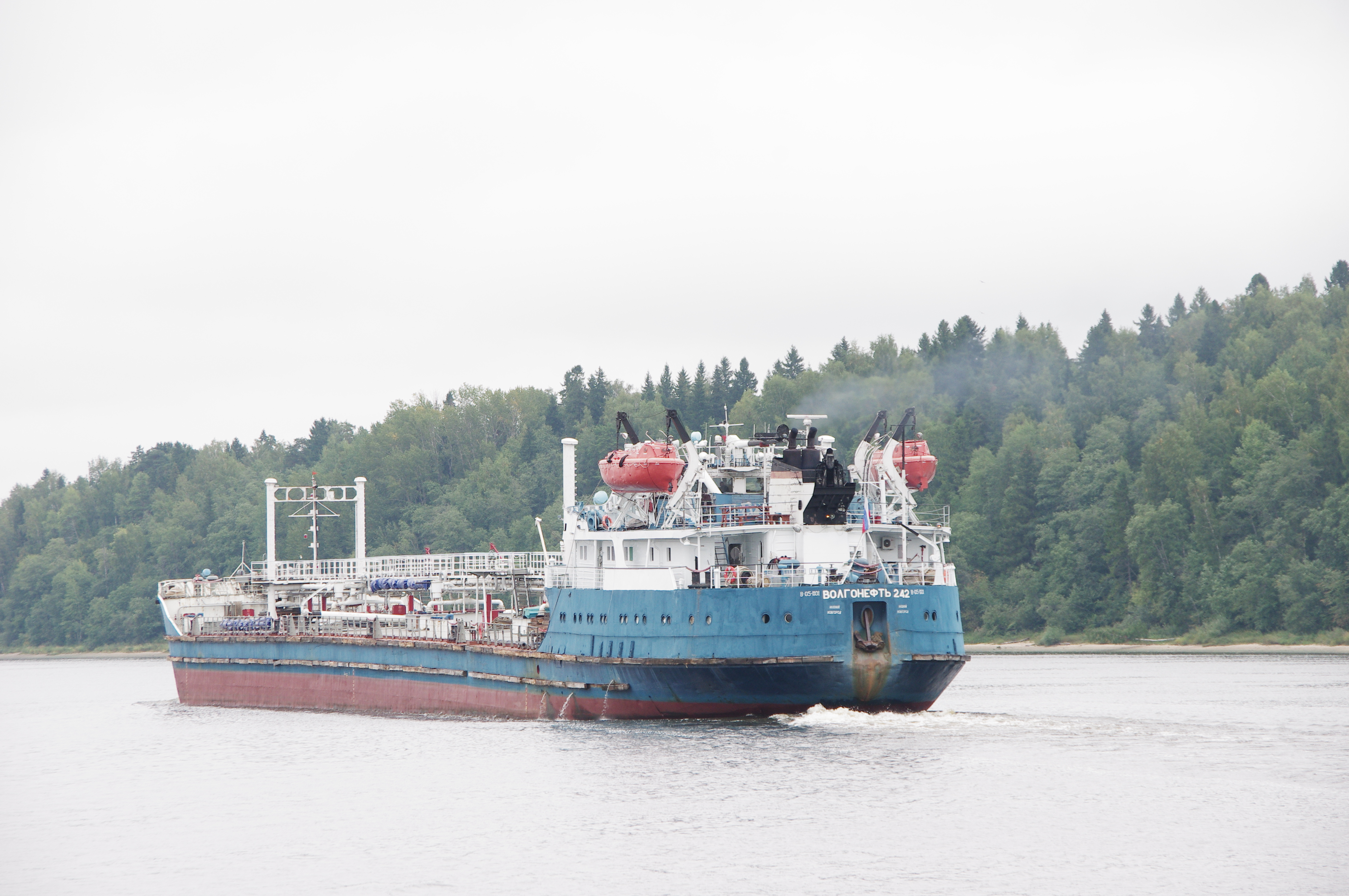
Project 1577 tanker Volgoneft-242 on the Volga in 2011

In 1997, Volgoneft-220 and Volgoneft-245 were renamed Mekhanik Semiglasov (Механик Семигласов) and Mekhanik Chebotaryov (Механик Чеботарёв) respectively. Dmitry Ivanovich Semiglasov was a mechanic of the steamship Smolensk, who died near Stalingrad in 1942. V.F. Chebotaryov was a mechanic of the steamship Opora Socialisma.

In 1998, Volgoneft-238 and Volgoneft-241 were renamed Viktor Sukharin (Виктор Сухарин) and Leonid Shmonin (Леонид Шмонин) respectively. V.I. Sukharin was Deputy Head of Volgotanker, and Commissioner of the People's Commissar of the River Fleet for Supply of the Front. In 2013 Viktor Sukharin was renamed Nefeli I, and in 2014 Leonid Shmonin was renamed Vyacheslav Pankov (Вячеслав Панков). Pankov had been a senior manager of Volgotanker.

Also in 1998, Volgoneft-232 and Volgoneft-253 were renamed Mekhanik Tormasov (Механик Тормасов) and Mekhanik Udodov (Механик Удодов) respectively. In 1999, Volgoneft-221 and Volgoneft-225 were renamed Mekhanik Voronkov (Механик Воронков) and Mekhanik I.Ya. Razhev (Механик И.Я. Ражев) respectively. Lev Sergeevich Voronkov was a mechanic of the steamship Manychstroy, and twice awarded the Order of Lenin. In 2000, Volgoneft-235 was renamed Mekhanik Banatov (Механик Банатов), after Nikolai Vasilyevich Banatov. He was a mechanic of the Volga State Shipping Company, led the Stakhanovite movement among river workers, and later headed the shipyard in Astrakhan.

In about 2000, Volgoneft-243 was renamed Marshal Skomorokhov (Маршал Скоморохов), after Nikolai Skomorokhov, a Second World War flying ace and later Marshal of the Soviet Air Forces. In about 2002, Volgoneft-202 was renamed Inzhener Nazarov (Инженер Назаров).

In 2006, Volgoneft-204; Volgoneft-206; and Volgoneft-211 were renamed Zherekh (Жерех); Taymen (Таймень); and Omul, (Омуль) after three species of fish. Taimen is a Russian salmonid; zherekh is Russian for asp; and omul is Russian for the Arctic cisco. In 2022, Zherekh was renamed Gogland (Гогланд), after the island of Gogland in the Baltic.

In about 2009, Volgoneft-228 was renamed Lensk (Ленск), after the town of Lensk in Siberia. In 2022 she was renamed again, as Navidzher-3 (Навиджер-3). In 2017, Volgoneft-263 was renamed Atlantic Wave 1. She is currently registered in Lagos, Nigeria. In 2020, Volgoneft-226 was renamed Blagovest (Благовест), after the blagovest style of Russian Orthodox bell ringing. In 2022, Volgoneft-236 was renamed Pyotr Bagration (Пётр Багратион), after Prince Pyotr Bagration, who was a general in the Napoleonic Wars. Also in 2022, Volgoneft-252 was renamed Naviger-2 (Навиджер-2).

12 Project 1577 tankers have been scrapped, starting with Marshal Skomorokhov in 2012.

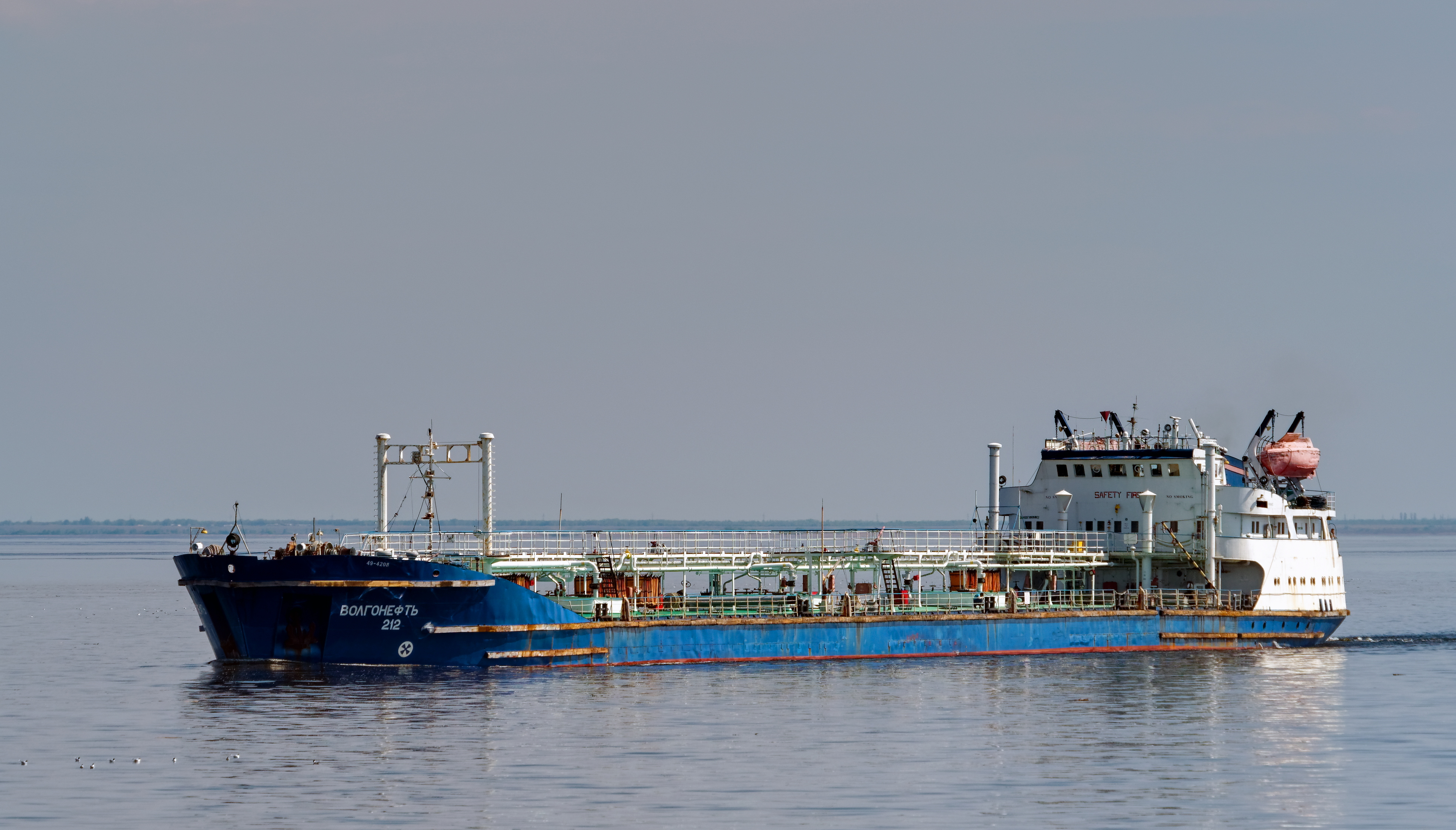
Project 1577 tanker Volgoneft-212 in 2018. She broke in two in 2024, causing a major oil spill.

=== Conversions ===
In 2024, Volgoneft-227 was converted into a dry cargo ship, and renamed Simbirtsit (Симбирцит). Simbirzite is a mineral: an amber-coloured variety of calcite. The hulls of at least two Project 1577 tankers, Nefeli I and Vyacheslav Pankov, have been shortened by 25 metres (82 ft). This is to allow them to be reclassified to operate in heavier seas.

=== Incidents ===
There have been emergencies aboard several Project 1577 tankers. Volgoneft-248 broke in two in 1999, and Volgoneft-212 did the same in 2024. Volgoneft-239 ran aground in the same storm that broke Volgoneft-212 in two. In 2012, a fire aboard Inzhener Nazarov, formerly Volgoneft-202, caused the death of one crew member.

== Project 550A ==
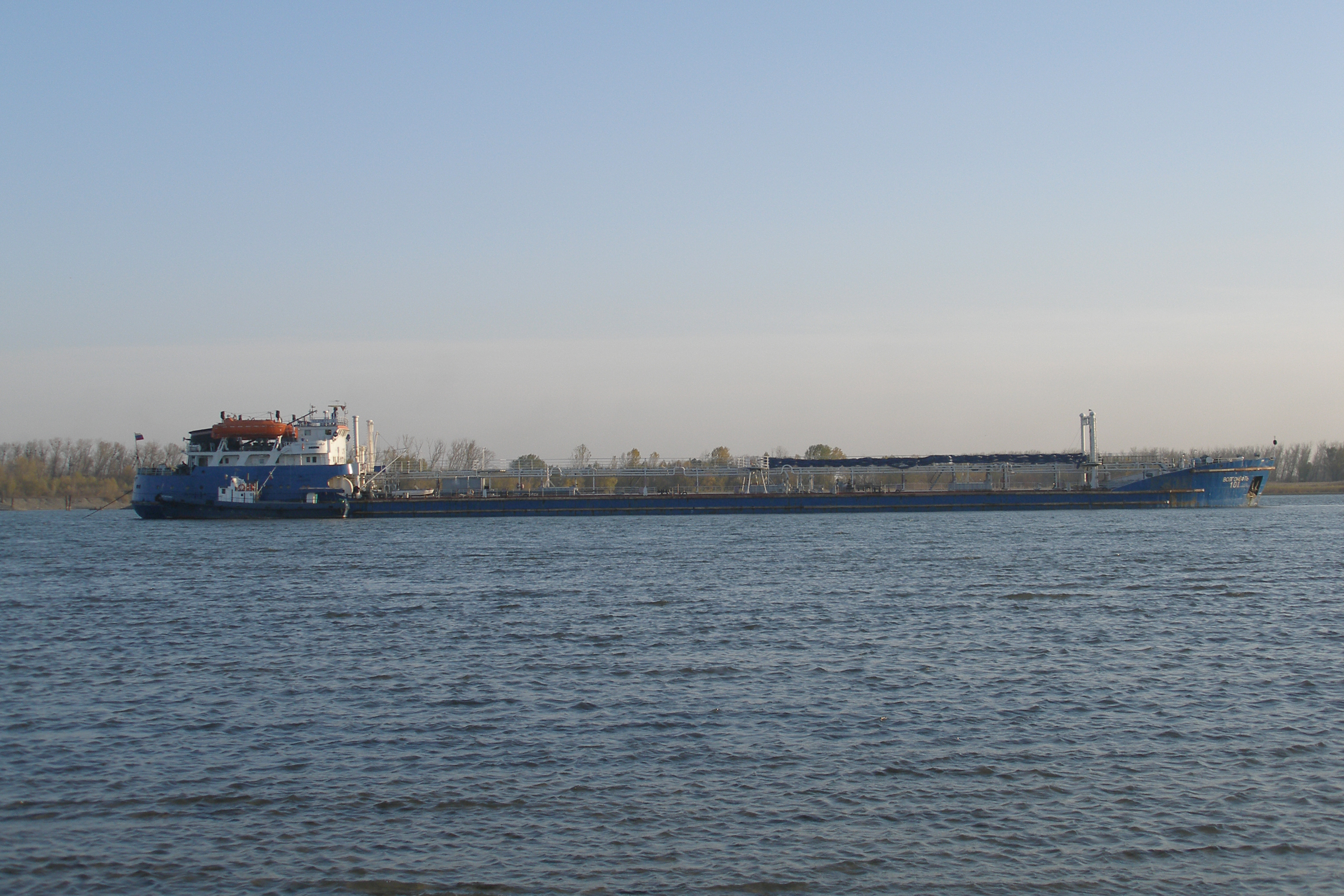
Project 550A tanker Volgoneft-101, lead ship of Project 550A, at Rostov-on-Don in 2005. She was built in 1971 as Volgoneft-83M.

Project 550A tankers were built between 1971 and 1982. 65 were built: the first four at the Dimitrov Shipyard in Varna; and the remainder at the "Ivan Dimitrov" Shipyard in Ruse, Bulgaria.

The first seven ships were named in two short series: Volgoneft-83M to Volgoneft-85M; Volgoneft-93Mto and Volgoneft-96M. In the 1973 renaming they were renamed in one continuous sequence from Volgoneft-101 to Volgoneft-107. The remainder were completed with names in a continuous series from Volgoneft-108 to Volgoneft-165.

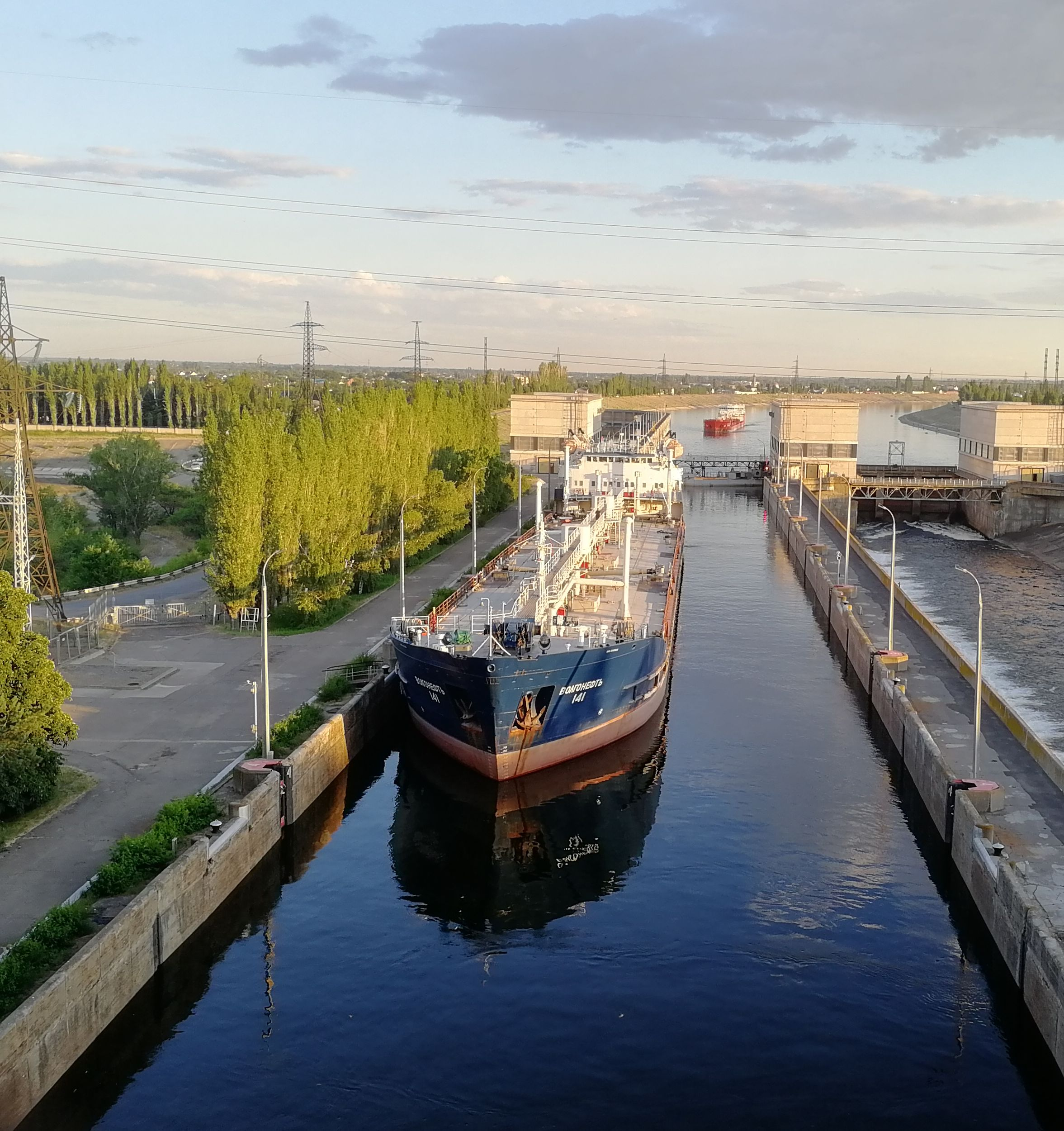
Project 550A tanker Volgoneft-141 in 2022, in the lock beside the Volga Hydroelectric Station

Some Project 550A tankers have since been renamed. In 1996, Volgoneft-127 was renamed Kapitan Pirozhkov (Капитан Пирожков), after N.I. Pirozhkov, who was a Volgotanker captain. In 1999, Volgoneft-110 was renamed Kapitan Timofeev (Капитан Тимофеев), after Nikolai Yakovlevich Timofeev, who was a Hero of Socialist Labour. In 2000, Volgoneft-161 was renamed Kola Beldy (Кола Бельды), after the Nanai singer Kola Beldy. In 2002 she was renamed again, as Tara-1 (Тара-1). In 2006, Volgoneft-113 was renamed Kapitan Zimin (Капитан Зимин), after Nikolai Gavrilovich Zimin, a senior manager of Volgotanker. In 2019, Volgoneft-165 became Navidzher-1 (Навиджер-1). In 2021, Volgoneft-146 was renamed Kapitan Kolesnikov (Капитан Колесников), after Nikolay Fedorovich Kolesnikov, a senior Volgotanker manager. Also in 2021, Volgoneft-138 became Vladimir Pankov (Владимир Панков). In 2022, Volgoneft-132 was renamed Pyotr Vrangel (Пётр Врангель). Pyotr Wrangel was a White Army general in the Russian Civil War. Volgoneft-147 was renamed Inlayn-147 (Инлайн-147) in 2009, but reverted to Volgoneft-147 in 2013.

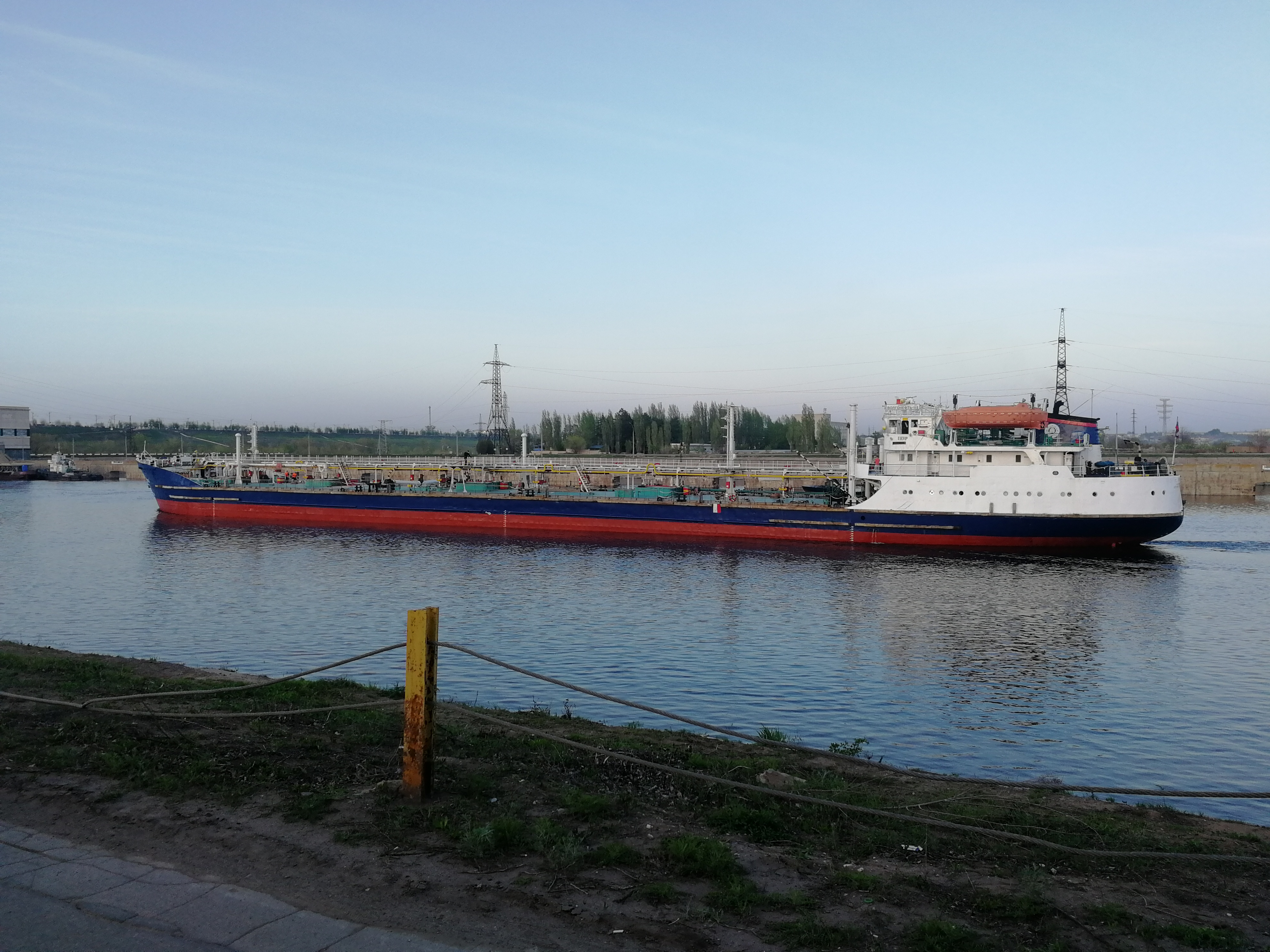
Project 550A tanker Volgoneft-115 in 2021, at the Volga Hydroelectric Station

In 2007, Volgoneft-139 broke in two in a storm in the Kerch Strait. Her bow sank, and both parts of the ship spilled oil into the sea, causing a major pollution incident.

12 Project 550A tankers have been scrapped, starting with Volgoneft-126 and Volgoneft-137 in 2009. Many are currently out of service, and a small number have been converted into barges. About 30 remain in service as tankers. In 2011, parts of Kapitan Timofeev's hull and superstructure were re-used to build the tanker Svatoy knyaz Vladimir (Святой князь Владимир, meaning "Holy Prince Vladimir").

== Project 630 ==
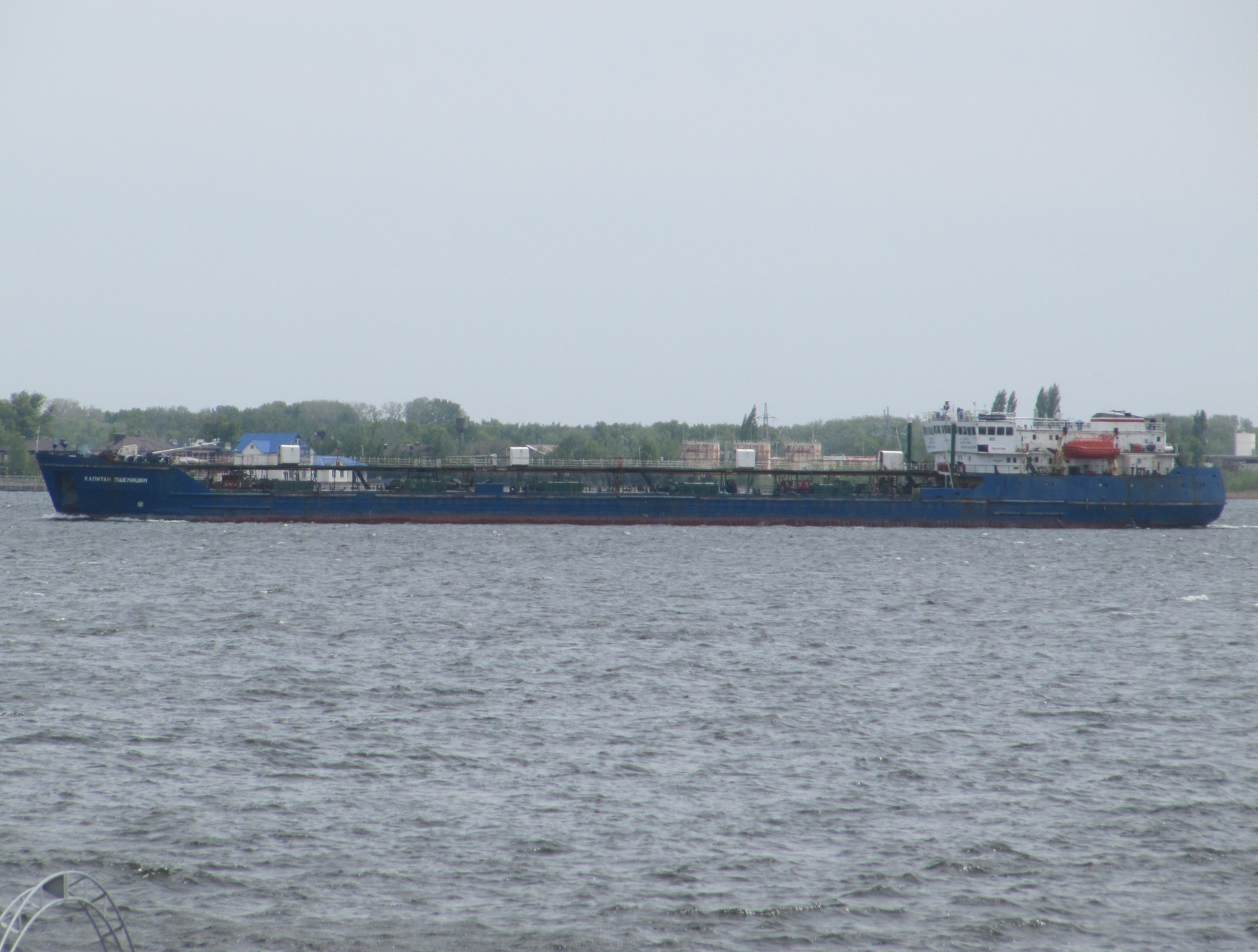
Project 630 tanker Kapitan Pshenitsin on the Volga in 2023. She was completed in 1987 as Volgoneft-168.

Project 630 tankers were built between 1984 and 1996. Nine were built; all at the "Ivan Dimitrov" shipyard (later Ruse Shipyard) in Bulgaria. The first six were originally named in a continuous sequence Volgoneft-166 to Volgoneft-171. The final three were completed without "Volgoneft-" names. Yard number 107 was launched in 1994 as Astrakhan Siti (Астрахань Сити, after the city of Astrakhan). Yard numbers 108 and 109 were launched in 1996 as Yaroslav Gashek (Ярослав Гашек, after the Czech writer Jaroslav Hašek); and Kazan Siti (Казань Сити, after the city of Kazan).

Seven ships of Project 630 have been renamed. In 1993, Volgoneft-171 was renamed Samara City (Самара Сити), after the city of Samara. In 1995, Volgoneft-169 was renamed Kapitan Permyakov (Капитан Пермяков), after Vasily Ilyich Permyakov, a captain with Volgotanker. In 1996, Volgoneft-170 was renamed Kapitan Shchemilkin (Капитан Щемилкин). In 1997, Volgoneft-168 was renamed Kapitan Pshenitsin (Капитан Пшеницин), after Vladimir Ivanovich Pshenitsyn, a senior captain with Volgotanker. Also in 1997, Volgoneft-166 was renamed Mekhanik Khachepuridze (Механик Хачепуридзе), after SN Khachepuridze, who was a mechanic of Volgoneft-259. She was renamed again in 2021, as Naviger-5 (Навиджер-5).

Volgoneft-167 has been renamed several times. She became Walrus in 1997; Pretty Falcon in 1998; Gurin (Гурин) in 2003; and Poseidon (Посейдон) in 2007. In 2011 she was renamed Geroy Rossii Pyatnitskikh (Герой России Пятницких), after Lieutenant-Colonel Sergey Ivanovich Pyatnitskikh. He was killed in action in 1995 in the First Chechen War, and was posthumously made a Hero of the Russian Federation. In 2013 the ship was renamed again, as Nordvik (Нордвик).

As of 2024, all nine ships of Project 630 remain in service.
