= Kuybyshevsky Zaton =

Kuybyshevsky Zaton Куйбышевский Затон
- Urban-type settlement

Other transcription(s)
  - Tatar: Затун
- Interactive map of Kuybyshevsky Zaton
- Location of Kuybyshevsky Zaton Kuybyshevsky Zaton (Tatarstan)
- Coordinates: 55°10′N 49°11′E
- Country: Russia
- Federal subject: Tatarstan
- Administrative district: Kamsko-Ustyinsky District
- Founded: beginning of the 17th century
- Urban-type settlement status since: 1929

Population (2010 Census)
  - Total: 2,677
  - Estimate (2021): 2,457 (−8.2%)

Municipal status
  - Municipal district: Kamsko-Ustyinsky Municipal District
  - Urban settlement: Kuybyshevsky Zaton Urban Settlement
  - Capital of: Kuybyshevsky Zaton Urban Settlement
- Time zone: UTC+3 (MSK)
- Postal code: 422826
- OKTMO ID: 92630157051

Kuybyshevsky Zaton (Russian: Ку́йбышевский Зато́н; Tatar: Затун) is an urban locality (an urban-type settlement) in Kamsko-Ustyinsky District of the Republic of Tatarstan, Russia, located on the shores of Kuybyshev Reservoir, 9 kilometers (5.6 mi) from Kamskoye Ustye, the administrative center of the district. As of the 2010 Census, its population was 2,677.

== History ==
It was established in the beginning of the 17th century and was granted urban-type settlement status in 1929. Until 1935, it was known as Spassky Zaton (Спасский Затон).

== Administrative and municipal status ==
Within the framework of administrative divisions, the urban-type settlement of Kuybyshevsky Zaton is subordinated to Kamsko-Ustyinsky District. As a municipal division, Kuybyshevsky Zaton is incorporated within Kamsko-Ustyinsky Municipal District as Kuybyshevsky Zaton Urban Settlement.

== Economy ==
As of 1997, the main industrial enterprise in Kuybyshevsky Zaton was the oil tanker service station.

== Demographics ==
Kuybyshevsky Zaton population
- 2010 Census: 2,677
- 2002 Census: 2,914
- 1989 Census: 2,922
- 1979 Census: 3,171

As of 1989, the population was mostly Russian (80.2%), Tatar (17.6%), and Chuvash (1.0%).
