= Mazut =

High-sulfur, low-quality heavy fuel oil

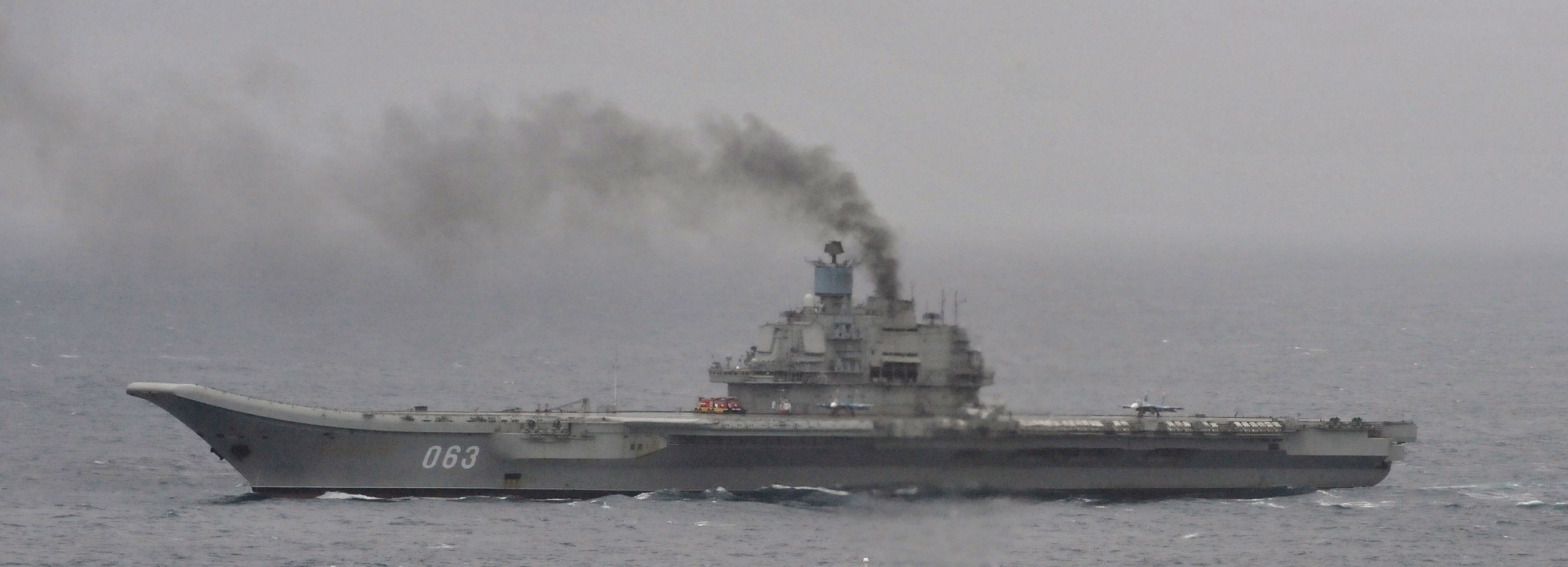
Russian aircraft carrier Admiral Kuznetsov uses mazut as a fuel, leading to a visible trail of heavy black smoke that can be seen at a great distance. Russian naval officials have said that the failure to properly preheat the mazut prior to entering the combustion chamber may contribute to the heavy smoke trail.

Mazut (Russian: Мазут, romanized: Mazut) is a very high-sulfur, low-quality heavy fuel oil that is typically produced as a residual product of petroleum refining after gasoline, diesel, and other light distillates are removed from crude oil. Similar to Bunker C (No. 6 fuel oil), mazut has high viscosity and sulfur content and is generally used as a fuel for large industrial boilers and power plants. However, unlike Bunker C, mazut is produced from lower grade source crude oil with higher sulfur content. Mazut is produced primarily in Azerbaijan, Iran, Kazakhstan, Russia, and Turkmenistan.

In some regions, mazut is burned directly as fuel, including in Iran and North Korea, where it has been used in power plants to compensate for shortages of higher-quality fuels. Its combustion is associated with significant air pollution due to its high sulfur content. Mazut is also used as a heating oil in some parts of the former Soviet Union and Far East that lack facilities to further refine or blend it into lighter petroleum products.

Marine oil spills involving mazut can have especially harmful environmental effects. The fuel solidifies at under 25 °C (77 °F), allowing it to sink to the seabed, making chemical remediation difficult. On 15 December 2024, two oil tankers collided in the Kerch Strait, releasing about 5,000 tonnes of mazut in the 2024 Black Sea oil spill. A similar spill occurred in the same strait during a November 2007 storm.

The commercial grading is Mazut-100, produced to GOST specifications such as GOST 10585-75 or GOST 10585-2013.

== Different types of Mazut-100 ==
The main difference between the different types of Mazut-100 is the content of sulphur. The grades are represented by these sulfuric levels:

- "Very low sulphur" is mazut with a sulphur content of 0.5% or less
- "Low sulphur" is a mazut with a sulphur content of 0.5–1.0%
- "Normal sulphur" is a mazut with a sulphur content of 1.0–2.0%
- "High sulphur" is a mazut with a sulphur content greater than 2.0%

By comparison, since 2020, the International Maritime Organization has banned vessels from using fuel oil with a sulphur content of higher than 0.5%, unless scrubbers are installed.

Very-low-sulphur mazut is generally made from the lowest-sulfur crude feedstocks. It has a very limited volume to be exported because:

- The number of producers in Russia is limited. Refineries that produce this are generally owned by the largest domestic oil companies, such as Lukoil and Rosneft, etc.
- In Russia and the CIS countries a minimum of 50% from the total produced volume is sold only to domestic consumers in Russia and the CIS.
- Most of the remainder amount is reserved by state quotas for state-controlled companies abroad.
- The remaining volume available for export is sold according to state quotas, via state auctions, accessible only to Russian domestic companies.

Low- to high-sulfur mazut is available from Russia and other CIS countries (Kazakhstan, Azerbaijan, Turkmenistan). The technical specifications are represented in the same way, according to the Russian GOST 10585-99. The Russian origin mazut demands higher prices.
