= Port of Taman =

Port Taman
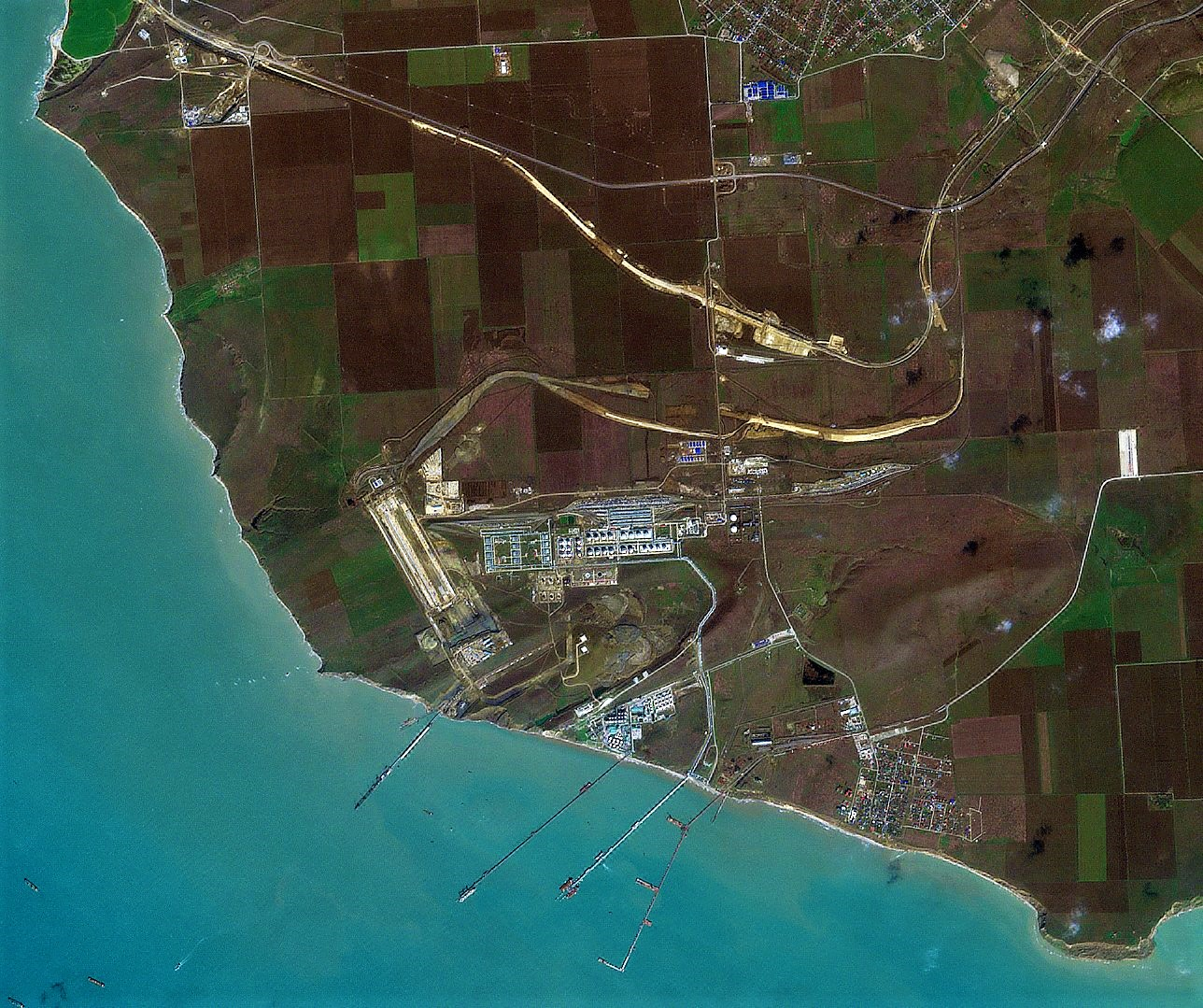
- Interactive map of Port Taman

Location
- Country: Russia
- Location: Taman Peninsula
- Coordinates: 45°07′30″N 36°41′00″E

Details
- Opened: 2009
- Owned by: Sea/River Fleet Administration (government)
- Type of Harbor: Artificial

Statistics
- Website https://taman-seaport.ru

The Port of Taman is a seaport on the Taman Peninsula in area of Cape Zhelezniy Rog, in the village of Volna, near the village of Taman in Temryuksky District of Krasnodar Krai, Russia.

== Overview ==
Business specialization - transshipment of goods for export. The port has terminals built and under construction for transshipment of the following cargoes: oil and oil products, liquefied petroleum gases, ammonia, grain, coal, fertilizers, iron ore, sulfur, steel products, and containerized cargo. In 2015, the port's cargo turnover amounted to 12.3 million tons (an increase of 20.8%), which raised it to 15th place among the ports of the Russian Federation.

In 2016, the port used transport approaches common with the Crimean bridge, which allows transshipment of cargo both through the Taman Peninsula and through the Crimea.

In 2016, depths on the approaches to the port were 20–25 meters. Vessels with a deadweight of up to 220,000 tons, length up to 300 m, width up to 50 m with a draft at berths up to 14 m and at a runway - up to 21 meters could enter the port.

== History and activities ==
As of June 2020, the seaport was still under construction, but already open for international traffic. It was officially opened for the services provision by the Ministry of Transport of the Russian Federation order of September 23, 2009 No.169.

In 2025, the port shipped roughly 4.16 million metric tons of oil products.

In 2026, during the Russo-Ukrainian war following the 2022 Russian invasion of Ukraine, the Port of Taman was attacked by Ukrainian aerial drones. On January 21, Ukrainian drones attacked oil infrastructure at the port and Tamanneftegaz. On February 15, an attack damaged an oil storage tank, warehouse, and terminals in Volna. Two people were injured; over 100 people worked to extinguish multiple fires. Ukraine’s General Staff claimed the strike. On July 30, Ukrainian forces struck the port area again. Russia’s Southern Transport Prosecutor’s Office and Kuban operational headquarters reported damage to port infrastructure, casualties, and a fire caused by UAV debris in the village of Volna (Temryuk District), where the petroleum products and dry cargo terminals are located. NASA FIRMS satellite data picked up fires at both the main port area and the Tamanneftegaz terminal.

Seaport scheme

External images
- Seaport scheme
- Plan (2013)
