= List of shipwrecks in 1999 =

The list of shipwrecks in 1999 includes ships sunk, foundered, grounded, or otherwise lost during 1999.

table of contents
1999
Jan	Feb	Mar	Apr
May	Jun	Jul	Aug
Sep	Oct	Nov	Dec
Unknown date

== January ==
=== 5 January ===
List of shipwrecks: 5 January 1999
Ship	State	Description
Athenian Pride	Cyprus	The tanker exploded and caught fire off Khor Fakkan, United Arab Emirates. Declared a constructive total loss, she arrived at Gadani Beach, Pakistan on 1 April for scrapping.
Galatea C.	United Kingdom	The fishing vessel foundered in the North Sea 25 nautical miles (46 km) north west of Rattray Head, Aberdeenshire. Her five crew were rescued.

=== 6 January ===
List of shipwrecks: 6 January 1999
Ship	State	Description
Beth Dee Bob	United States	The 84-foot (25.6 m) clam dredger sank in heavy seas in the North Atlantic Ocean 13 nautical miles (24 km; 15 mi) off Manasquan, New Jersey, in 120 feet (37 m) of water. Three of her four-member crew were lost at sea; the fourth was lifted from the water by a United States Coast Guard helicopter but died in the hospital.

=== 8 January ===
List of shipwrecks: 8 January 1999
Ship	State	Description
Cape Fear	United States	Overloaded with clams, the 112-foot (34.1 m) fishing trawler and clam dredger sank off New Bedford, Massachusetts, with the loss of two lives. The fishing vessel Misty Dawn (United States) rescued her three survivors. Cape Fear was refloated during the summer of 1999 and was scuttled as an artificial reef in 2000.

=== 9 January ===
List of shipwrecks: 9 January 1999
Ship	State	Description
Duba	Croatia	The cargo ship sank at Split. She was refloated on 29 June.

=== 11 January ===
List of shipwrecks: 11 January 1999
Ship	State	Description
Nowitna	United States	The 125-foot (38.1 m) opilio crab-fishing vessel sank in the Bering Sea approximately 70 nautical miles (130 km; 81 mi) west of Cold Bay, Alaska. A United States Coast Guard helicopter rescued her entire crew of six.

=== 13 January ===
List of shipwrecks: 13 January 1999
Ship	State	Description
Kado	São Tomé and Príncipe	The cargo ship caught fire at Kumkapı, Turkey. Declared a constructive total loss, she arrived at Aliağa, Turkey on 22 December for scrapping.

=== 15 January ===
List of shipwrecks: 15 January 1999
Ship	State	Description
Delilah	United States	The retired 86-foot (26.2 m) tug was scuttled as an artificial reef in the North Atlantic Ocean off the coast of Delaware in 75 feet (22.9 m) of water at 38°40.540′N 074°43.957′W.
Kae Chuck Jin	South Korea	The dredger sank in the East China Sea (33°30′N 129°40′E) with the loss of six of her thirteen crew.

=== 16 January ===
List of shipwrecks: 16 January 1999
Ship	State	Description
Carolines	Panama	The cargo ship sprang a leak in the Pacific Ocean and was abandoned by her 23 crew. She foundered the next day (17°39′42″N 132°58′18″E).

=== 18 January ===
List of shipwrecks: 18 January 1999
Ship	State	Description
Adriatic	United States	The 74-foot (22.6 m) clam dredger sank in bad weather in 65 feet (20 m) of water in the North Atlantic Ocean about 9 nautical miles (17 km; 10 mi) due east of Barnegat Light, New Jersey, with the loss of her entire crew of four.

=== 19 January ===
List of shipwrecks: 19 January 1999
Ship	State	Description
Sea Dream	Greece	The bulk carrier was driven ashore at Alexandria, Egypt. She had previously been declared a total loss following an engine room fire.

=== 20 January ===
List of shipwrecks: 20 January 1999
Ship	State	Description
Manuela Cervera	Spain	The fishing vessel foundered in the Atlantic Ocean (23°11′S 11°48′W). Her sixteen crew were rescued.

=== 21 January ===
List of shipwrecks: 21 January 1999
Ship	State	Description
Gregory Lind	United States	The 26-foot (7.9 m) sea cucumber and sea urchin dive boat was destroyed by fire while at a pier in Ketchikan, Alaska. All three people on board survived.
Raicho Maru	Japan	The cargo ship ran aground at Niigata. Her crew were rescued. She had been refloated by 26 January. Declared a constructive total loss, she was scrapped.

=== 22 January ===
List of shipwrecks: 26 January 1999
Ship	State	Description
Nowitna	United States	The fishing vessel foundered in Bristol Bay, Alaska. Her crew were rescued.

=== 26 January ===
List of shipwrecks: 26 January 1999
Ship	State	Description
Saint Francis of Assisi	Philippines	The ro-ro ship caught fire at Butuan. The fire was extinguished the next day. Declared a constructive total loss, she was subsequently scrapped.

=== 27 January ===
List of shipwrecks: 27 January 1999
Ship	State	Description
Pulau Baai II	Indonesia	The cargo ship ran aground in Pulau Baai (3°53′S 102°17′E). She was a total loss.

=== 28 January ===
List of shipwrecks: 28 January 1999
Ship	State	Description
Peace	Belize	The bulk carrier sprang a leak and foundered 32 nautical miles (59 km) off Colombo, Sri Lanka. Her crew were rescued.

=== 30 January ===
List of shipwrecks: 30 January 1999
Ship	State	Description
Atlantos	United States	The 38-foot (11.6 m) cod-fishing vessel iced up, capsized, and sank in Blying Sound on the south-central coast of Alaska south of Pilot Rock (59°44′30″N 149°28′00″W). The fishing vessels Dolphin and Iceberg (United States) rescued her crew of three.
Carcinta	Spain	The fishing vessel sprang a leak and foundered in the Atlantic Ocean (19°33′22″N 74°06′54″W) Her thirteen crew were rescued.
Kavkaz	United States	The 36-foot (11.0 m) longline cod-fishing vessel iced up and capsized 1.5 nautical miles (2.8 km; 1.7 mi) off Point Pogibshi (59°25′30″N 151°53′00″W) on the south-central coast of Alaska, trapping her crew of two brothers underneath her overturned hull until 31 January, when the crew of the cutter USCGC Roanoke Island ( United States Coast Guard) cut through the hull with a chainsaw and extracted them. One of the Kavkaz′s crewmen died of hypothermia, but the other survived.

=== 31 January ===
List of shipwrecks: 31 January 1999
Ship	State	Description
Joint Dorcas	Malta	The cargo ship ran aground and sank off Mawei, China. Her 23 crew were rescued.

=== Unknown date ===
List of shipwrecks: Unknown date in January 1999
Ship	State	Description
Almetyevsk	Russia	The fishing vessel collided with the fishing vessel Hangsung 31 (Flag unknown) and sank between Nevelsk and Kholmsk. Her crew were rescued.

== February ==
=== 3 February ===
List of shipwrecks: 3 February 1999
Ship	State	Description
Gion Maru No.3	Japan	The tug foundered off Ikata-Cho.
Northern Aurora	United States	The 30-foot (9.1 m) longline cod-fishing vessel capsized due to icing 150 yards (140 meters) off Caines Head Beach (59°59′N 149°23′W) in the Caines Head State Recreation Area on the south-central coast of Alaska and washed ashore on the western coast of Fox Island (59.9272°N 149.3289°W) approximately 8 nautical miles (15 km; 9.2 mi) south of Seward with the loss of one life. There was one survivor.

=== 4 February ===
List of shipwrecks: 4 February 1999
Ship	State	Description
Agios Nikolaos	Cyprus	The cargo ship suffered an engine failure 650 nautical miles (1,200 km) west of Karachi, Pakistan. She was towed in to Mina Saqr. Declared a constructive total loss, she arrived at Alang, India on 27 July for scrapping.
Mersinia	Panama	The cargo ship caught fire in the Atlantic Ocean (22°23′N 17°05′W). Her crew were rescued. She was towed in to Las Palmas, Canary Islands. Declared a constructive total loss, she arrived at Santander, Spain under tow on 21 January 2000 for scrapping.
New Carissa	Panama	New Carissa The cargo ship ran aground and broke apart in Coos Bay, Oregon. The stern section remained on the beach until scrapped in 2008.

=== 5 February ===
List of shipwrecks: 5 February 1999
Ship	State	Description
Petit Folmer	Denmark	The cargo ship foundered in the North Sea 50 nautical miles (93 km) west of Esbjerg (55°09′N 7°14′E with the loss of two of her five crew. Two people were reported missing.

=== 10 February ===
List of shipwrecks: 10 February 1999
Ship	State	Description
Express Yuso	Panama	The cargo ship ran aground 19 nautical miles (35 km) off Keelung, Taiwan (25°25′N 121°53′E). Declared a constructive total loss, she was broken up in situ.
Harta Rimba	Indonesia	The ship foundered off Borneo with the loss of over 280 lives. Nineteen survivors were rescued.
Vera	Greece	The cargo ship ran aground on the Lefteris Reef, off Skiathos. Her seven crew were rescued.. She was a total loss.

=== 11 February ===
List of shipwrecks: 11 February 1999
Ship	State	Description
Alexa von Mercurius	Cambodia	The cargo ship was abandoned 20 nautical miles (37 km) north east of Lesbos, Greece (39°27′N 25°41′E). She subsequently came ashore on Bozcaada Island, Turkey (39°33′36″N 25°44′40″E). She was a total loss.

=== 18 February ===
List of shipwrecks: 18 February 1999
Ship	State	Description
Sea Quail	United States	With her helmsman asleep at the wheel, the 74-foot (22.6 m) fishing vessel struck Ikognak Rock (57°56′N 152°50′W) in Whale Passage near Kodiak, Alaska, and sank. Her crew of four was rescued from a life raft by the fishing vessel Midnight Sun (United States).

=== 21 February ===
List of shipwrecks: 21 February 1999
Ship	State	Description
Goitume Primero	Spain	The fishing vessel foundered in the Atlantic Ocean (20°43′N 17°16′W). Her eighteen crew were rescued.

=== 22 February ===
List of shipwrecks: 22 February 1999
Ship	State	Description
Mary Helen	United States	The 50-foot (15.2 m) codfish trawler was destroyed 15 nautical miles (28 km; 17 mi) southwest of King Cove, Alaska, by a fire that began in a stateroom. Her crew of two survived.

=== 23 February ===
List of shipwrecks: 23 February 1999
Ship	State	Description
Rize K.	Turkey	The cargo ship was driven ashoreat Eskişehir. She was refloated and taken in to Istanbul. Declared a constructive total loss, she arrived at Aliağa on 2 June for scrapping.

=== 24 February ===
List of shipwrecks: 24 February 1999
Ship	State	Description
Kestrel	United Kingdom	The fishing vessel foundered in the North Sea (59°35′N 1°53′E). her six crew were rescued.
Nicolas I. K.	Cyprus	The cargo ship caught fire off Punta Medanos, Argentina (36°53′S 56°41′W). She was towed in to Buenos Aires on 28 February. Declared a constructive total loss, she was scrapped at Alang, India.

=== 25 February ===
List of shipwrecks: 25 February 1999
Ship	State	Description
Selin S.	Honduras	The cargo ship was driven ashore at Istanbul, Turkey. She was a total loss.

=== 28 February ===
List of shipwrecks: 28 February 1999
Ship	State	Description
Collins	Honduras	The cargo ship was driven ashore in the Nishitsugaru District, Japan. Her crew were rescued by helicopter. She was declared a constructive total loss and scrapped.
Kondovyy	Russia	The fishing vessel ran aground in the Kuril Islands (50°45′N 156°12′E. Her seventeen crew were rescued.

=== Unknown date ===
List of shipwrecks: Unknown date in February 1999
Ship	State	Description
Gantiadi-3	Georgia	The ship sank at Batumi.
Polarstrom	Chile	The fishing vessel was lost.

== March ==
=== 4 March ===
List of shipwrecks: 4 March 1999
Ship	State	Description
Arizona 1981	Panama	The cargo ship sprang a leak in the South China Sea (18°29′54″N 119°23′00″E) and subsequently foundered. Her seventeen crew were rescued.

=== 11 March ===
List of shipwrecks: 12 March 1999
Ship	State	Description
Xove	Spain	The cargo ship capsized at Aveiro, Portugal with the loss of three of her nine crew. One person was reported missing.

=== 12 March ===
List of shipwrecks: 12 March 1999
Ship	State	Description
Alska	United States	The 63-foot (19.2 m) longline cod-fishing vessel capsized and sank without loss of life in Hallo Bay on the south coast of the Alaska Peninsula in Alaska west of Kodiak Island. The fishing vessel T-Mike (United States) rescued one of her four crew members; a United States Coast Guard helicopter rescued the other three.
St. George	United States	The retired 97-foot (29.6 m) fishing trawler was scuttled as an artificial reef in the North Atlantic Ocean south of Long Island 2.5 nautical miles (4.6 km; 2.9 mi) off Moriches Inlet, New York.

=== 14 March ===
List of shipwrecks: 14 March 1999
Ship	State	Description
Amer Ved	Cyprus	The cargo ship collided with the tanker Seapride I (Malta) off Khor Fakkan, United Arab Emirates. Declared a constructive total loss, she arrived at Alang, India on 19 June for scrapping.
Long Chau	Vietnam	The dredger collided with Woo Jin (South Korea) and sank off Haiphong.

=== 16 March ===
List of shipwrecks: 16 March 1999
Ship	State	Description
Core No.8	Belize	The cargo ship sprang a leak 50 nautical miles (93 km) off the Tosaki Lighthouse, Japan and was abandoned by her crew. She subsequently foundered.

=== 17 March ===
List of shipwrecks: 17 March 1999
Ship	State	Description
Horieh	Syria	The cargo ship sank in the Red Sea 15 nautical miles (28 km) off Jeddah, Saudi Arabia with the loss of a crew member.

=== 18 March ===
List of shipwrecks: 18 March 1999
Ship	State	Description
Lin J	United States	The 96-foot (29.3 m) crab-fishing vessel iced up, capsized, and sank in the Bering Sea 8 nautical miles (15 km; 9.2 mi) south of Saint Paul Island with the loss of her entire five-man crew.

=== 21 March ===
List of shipwrecks: 21 March 1999
Ship	State	Description
Playa da Coba	Spain	The fishing vessel caught fire in the Atlantic Ocean She capsized and sank the next day (50°22′S 61°24′W). Her 28 crew were rescued.

=== 23 March ===
List of shipwrecks: 23 March 1999
Ship	State	Description
Qi Yun 881	China	The LPG tanker collided with the container ship Qing Chun Men (Flag unknown) and sank 2.5 nautical miles (4.6 km) off Hong Kong (22°09′N 114°11′E). Her fifteen crew were rescued.

=== 30 March ===
List of shipwrecks: 30 March 1999
Ship	State	Description
Delfin C.	Uruguay	The fishing vessel sank at Montevideo.
Inpesur II	Uruguay	The fishing vessel sank at Montevideo.
Inpesur III	Uruguay	The fishing vessel sank at Montevideo.
Mar Cantabrico I	Uruguay	The fishing vessel sank at Montevideo.
Urupez I	Uruguay	The fishing vessel sank at Montevideo.

=== 31 March ===
List of shipwrecks: 31 March 1999
Ship	State	Description
Manpok	North Korea	The cargo ship collided with the container ship Hyundai Duke (Cyprus) and sank in the Indian Ocean 350 nautical miles (650 km) south east of Sri Lanka. Two of her 39 crew were rescued, the rest were reported missing.

=== Unknown date ===
List of shipwrecks: Unknown date in March 1999
Ship	State	Description
Chaika	Malta	The bulk carrier was reported aground at Badagry, Lagos in late March. She was declared to only be of scrap value.
Dehesas	Mozambique	The fishing vessel was lost.
Errachid 1	Mauritania	The fishing vessel was destroyed by fire.
Usiwe Kupe	Tanzania	The passenger ship sank at Dar-es-Salaam.
Wall Brook	United Kingdom	The dredger was scuttled.

== April ==
=== 9 April ===
List of shipwrecks: 9 April 1999
Ship	State	Description
	Panama	The bulk carrier suffered and engine failure 4 nautical miles (7.4 km) off Anacapa Island, California, United States. She was towed in to Los Angeles, California the next day. Declared a constructive total loss, she arrived at Panyu, China on 3 August for scrapping.

=== 10 April ===
List of shipwrecks: 10 April 1999
Ship	State	Description
Van Loi	United States	The fishing vessel ran aground and was wrecked off Waipouli, Hawaii Her six crew were rescued.

=== 12 April ===
List of shipwrecks: 12 April 1999
Ship	State	Description
Reedy Point	United States	The tug was run into by Del Monte Consumer (Liberia) and sank at Philadelphia, Pennsylvania. She was refloated on 18 April. Consequently scrapped at New York.

=== 13 April ===
List of shipwrecks: 13 April 1999
Ship	State	Description
Nueva Luz Del Cantabrico	Spain	The fishing vessel sprang a leak and foundered in the Bay of Biscay 50 nautical miles (93 km) north of Cape Machichaco (44°12′N 2°40′W). Her twelve crew were rescued.

=== 15 April ===
List of shipwrecks: 15 April 1999
Ship	State	Description
Miss Fernandina	United States	The fishing vessel was reported 65 nautical miles (120 km) east of Flagler Beach, Florida. No further trace, reported missing with four crew.

=== 19 April ===
List of shipwrecks: 19 April 1999
Ship	State	Description
Golden England	Philippines	The cargo ship collided with the refrigerated cargo ship EW Rainier (Panama) and sank off Davao (7°07′N 126°37′E). Her 21 crew were rescued.

=== 20 April ===
List of shipwrecks: 20 April 1999
Ship	State	Description
Algorail	Canada	The bulk carrier ran aground in the Fox River at Green Bay, Wisconsin. The ship was later freed, but the tugboats used to free the ship caused damage to docks at Green Bay.
Marimar	Cyprus	The bulk carrier ran aground off Massawa, Eritrea. She was refloated on 26 May and towed in to Massawa. Declared a constructive total loss, she arrived at Alang, India on 27 December for scrapping.

=== 21 April ===
List of shipwrecks: 24 April 1999
Ship	State	Description
Han Doo No.202	South Korea	The fishing vessel foundered in the Atlantic Ocean (46°42′S 60°32′W) with the loss of two of her 33 crew. Two people were reported missing.

=== 24 April ===
List of shipwrecks: 24 April 1999
Ship	State	Description
Zahari Stoianov	Bulgaria	The cargo ship ran aground at Marseille, Bouches-du-Rhône, France. She was later refloated but was declared a constructive total loss.

=== 26 April ===
List of shipwrecks: 26 April 1999
Ship	State	Description
Marina I	Belize	The cargo ship departed from Dumai, Indonesia for Yangon, Myanmar. No further trace, reported missing.

=== 28 April ===
List of shipwrecks: 28 April 1999
Ship	State	Description
Efxinos Pontos	Malta	The tanker caught fire 20 nautical miles (37 km) off Paphos, Greece and was abandoned by her crew. She was towed in to Piraeus, Greece on 6 May. Declared a constructive total loss, She arrived at Aliağa, Turkey on 25 March 2000 for scrapping.

=== 29 April ===
List of shipwrecks: 29 April 1999
Ship	State	Description
Chang Shun	Panama	The cargo ship ran aground off Hainan, China (19°37′42″N 110°59′30″E). Her fifteen crew were rescued. She sank the next day.
Feliz Trader	Panama	The cargo ship foundered in the South China Sea (19°47′09″N 113°38′09″E) with the loss of one of her 21 crew. Thirteen people were reported missing.
Rhodos III	Panama	The cargo ship sank at Douala, Angola.
Stronghand	Nigeria	The chemical tanker ran aground and sank in the Escravos River. Her crew were taken hostage, but subsequently released. The vessel was subsequently vandalised.

=== Unknown date ===
List of shipwrecks: Unknown date in April 1999
Ship	State	Description
Britoil 2	Singapore	The tug capsized and sank off Surasaniyanam, India on or about 7 April. Seven of her eleven crew were rescued, the other four were presumed dead.

== May ==
=== 3 May ===
List of shipwrecks: 3 May 1999
Ship	State	Description
Ginger B.	United States	The fishing vessel foundered in the Pacific Ocean more than 800 nautical miles (1,500 km) north west of Monterey, California. Her three crew were rescued.

=== 8 May ===
List of shipwrecks: 8 May 1999
Ship	State	Description
Controller Bay	United States	After her captain fell asleep at her wheel with the self-steering gear on, the 78-foot (23.8 m) fishing vessel ran onto rocks near Cave Point (54°47′10″N 164°37′00″W) on Cape Mordvinof on Unimak Island in the Aleutian Islands. She broke up in high winds and heavy surf. Wearing survival suits, her crew of four abandoned ship in a life raft and was rescued by the fishing vessel Shaman (United States).
Pengibu	Indonesia	The cargo ship suffered a hull fracture and foundered 60 nautical miles (110 km) south of Wowoni. One of her 27 crew was rescued, eighteen died and eight were repored missing.

=== 9 May ===
List of shipwrecks: 9 May 1999
Ship	State	Description
Iphegenia	Panama	The cargo ship suffered an engine breakdown 400 to 500 nautical miles (740 to 930 km) off Hong Kong. She was towed in to Hong Kong on 15 May. Declaed a constructive total loss, she arrived at Xinhui, China on 16 August for scrapping.
BRP Sierra Madre	Philippine Navy	The Cotobato-class tank landing ship was deliberately run aground on the Ayungin Shoal in a territorial dispute with China.

=== 11 May ===
List of shipwrecks: 13 May 1999
Ship	State	Description
Elenamaria	Antigua and Barbuda	The cargo ship developed a list at Keratsini, Greece and was abandoned by her crew. She sank the next day.

=== 12 May ===
List of shipwrecks: 12 May 1999
Ship	State	Description
Genesis	Saint Vincent and the Grenadines	The research vessel foundered 21 nautical miles (39 km) off Saint Vincent. Her three crew were reported missing.

=== 13 May ===
List of shipwrecks: 13 May 1999
Ship	State	Description
Margona	United Kingdom	The fishing vessel sprang a leak and sank in the North Sea 60°07′N 3°27′E). Her crew were rescued.
Unga	United States	The 37.5-foot (11.4 m) longline halibut-fishing vessel was destroyed by fire at Sand Point, Alaska. The only person on board at the time survived.

=== 16 May ===
List of shipwrecks: 16 May 1999
Ship	State	Description
Denisovo	Russia	The fishing vessel ran aground and sank near Iturup Island (44°42′N 147°20′E). Her crew were rescued.

=== 17 May ===
List of shipwrecks: 17 May 1999
Ship	State	Description
Windward	United States	The 41-foot (12.5 m) longline halibut-fishing vessel struck a rock and sank in Nichols Bay 50 nautical miles (93 km; 58 mi) southwest of Ketchikan, Alaska. Wearing survival suits, both of her crew members abandoned ship in a life raft, from which a United States Coast Guard helicopter rescued them.

=== 20 May ===
List of shipwrecks: 20 May 1999
Ship	State	Description
Sun Vista	Bahamas	The cruise ship suffered an engine room fire while in the Strait of Malacca. All 1,090 passengers and crew were rescued before the ship sank on 21 May.

=== 22 May ===
List of shipwrecks: 22 May 1999
Ship	State	Description
Acor	Saint Vincent and the Grenadines	The container ship collided with the container ship Salango (Flag unknown) in the Mozambique Channel (10°38′48″S 40°48′32″E). She sank the next day with the loss of two of her fourteen crew. One person was reported missing.
Carolina	Brazil	The offshore supply vessel founderef off Campos, Brazil. Her ten crew were rescued.

=== 25 May ===
List of shipwrecks: 25 May 1999
Ship	State	Description
Sik Yang	Malaysia	The cargo ship was reported 120 nautical miles (220 km) north west of Colombo, Sri Lanka. She was on a voyage from Tuticorin, India to Malacca. No further trace, reported missing with fifteen crew.

=== Unknown date ===
List of shipwrecks: Unknown date May 1999
Ship	State	Description
Caprice	United States	The 68-foot (20.7 m) fishing vessel ran aground in early May near False Pass, Alaska, after her helmsman fell asleep at her wheel. She was refloated and returned to service.

== June ==
=== 6 June ===
List of shipwrecks: 6 June 1999
Ship	State	Description
Caprice	United States	During a voyage from Seward to Kodiak, Alaska, the 68-foot (20.7 m) fishing vessel sank in the Gulf of Alaska approximately 11 nautical miles (20 km; 13 mi) southeast of Nuka Island on the south-central coast of Alaska after her engine room flooded. All four members of her crew put on survival suits and abandoned ship in a life raft, and the fishing vessel Kaia (United States) rescued them.
Noualig	Mauritania	The fishing vessel foundered in the Atlantic Ocean 30 nautical miles (56 km) west of Cape Timiris (19°30′N 16°57′W). Her eighteen crew were rescued.
Soyo	Angola	The fishing vessel foundered in the Banana Channel, Boma, Democratic Republic of the Congo. All on board were rescued.

=== 9 June ===
List of shipwrecks: 9 June 1999
Ship	State	Description
Basari	Turkey	The cargo ship foundered in the Mediterranean Sea (25°52′05″N 31°06′08″E). Her ten crew were rescued.

=== 10 June ===
List of shipwrecks: 10 June 1999
Ship	State	Description
Habakzi	Syria	The cargo ship caught fire at Latakia. She was a total loss and was subsequently scrapped.

=== 14 June ===
List of shipwrecks: 14 June 1999
Ship	State	Description
Number One	Saint Vincent and the Grenadines	The cargo ship foundered 200 nautical miles (370 km) off Trincomalee, Sri Lanka. Seven of her eighteen crew were rescued, the rest were reported missing.
Princess Claudia	Belize	The cargo ship was sunk by a tornado at Bissau, Guinea-Bissau.

=== 15 June ===
List of shipwrecks: 15 June 1999
Ship	State	Description
Diglipur	India	The cargo ship suffered a broken propeller shaft 150 nautical miles (280 km) off Port Blair, Andaman and Nicobar Islands. She was towed in to Chittagong, Bangladesh on 4 July. Declared a constructive total loss, She was beached there for scrapping on 19 November.
Unidentified motor torpedo boat	Korean People's Navy	First Battle of Yeonpyeong: The motor torpedo boat was sunk by South Korean ships.

=== 16 June ===
List of shipwrecks: 16 June 1999
Ship	State	Description
Reward	United States	The 38-foot (11.6 m) salmon-fishing vessel capsized and sank in Sumner Strait in the Alexander Archipelago in Southeast Alaska. The only person on board abandoned ship in a survival suit and was rescued by the fishing vessel Tammy Sue (United States).

=== 17 June ===
List of shipwrecks: 17 June 1999
Ship	State	Description
Nordic Dancer	United States	The charter vessel sank in the Gulf of Alaska off Kodiak Island near the tip of Spruce Cape (57°49′15″N 152°20′00″W) northeast of Kodiak, Alaska.

=== 25 June ===
List of shipwrecks: 25 June 1999
Ship	State	Description
Doris	French Navy	The decommissioned Daphné-class submarine accidentally sank with no one aboard in 939 metres (3,081 ft) of water in the Mediterranean Sea off France's Levant Island at 43.1028333°N 006.5726667°E while being submerged to a shallow depth for use as a target in a test firing of the MU90 Impact anti-submarine torpedo.

=== 29 June ===
List of shipwrecks: 29 June 1999
Ship	State	Description
Duba	Croatia	The cargo ship was scuttled off the Kraljevac Islet.
King Star No.3	Honduras	The fishing vessel was severely damaged by fire at Las Palmas, Canary Islands. She was a total loss.
Tosei Maru No.8	Japan	The cargo ship collided with the ro-ro ship Nissei (Japan) and sank 2 nautical miles (3.7 km) off the Iragomisak Lighthouse. One of her five crew was rescued, four were reported missing.

=== 30 June ===
List of shipwrecks: 30 June 1999
Ship	State	Description
Su-Ce-K	United States	The 44-foot (13.4 m) salmon troller was destroyed by an electrical fire that began in her engine room and sank in 300 feet (91 meters) of water off Sitka, Alaska. Her crew of two survived and was rescued by the fishing vessel Destiny (United States).

=== Unknown date ===
List of shipwrecks: Unknown date in June 1999
Ship	State	Description
Fast Alexandria	Egypt	The ro-ro ship suffered engine damage on or around 5 June. She was on a voyage from Tangier, Morocco to Setúbal, Portugal, where she arrived on 10 June. She was towed to Lisbon, Portugal on 6 September. Declared a constructive total loss, she was scrapped.
Rhodos	Greece	The ro-ro ship foundered.

== July ==
=== 1 July ===
List of shipwrecks: 1 July 1999
Ship	State	Description
Maritime Fidelity	Panama	The bulk carrier collided with the tanker New Venture (Flag unknown) and sank off the Horsburgh Lighthouse, Singapore. Her 28 crew were rescued.

=== 7 July ===
List of shipwrecks: 7 July 1999
Ship	State	Description
David T	United States	While no one was aboard, the 32-foot (9.8 m) salmon-fishing vessel was destroyed in Refuge Cove (55°24′N 131°45′W) in Southeast Alaska by a fire that began in her galley stove.
Irene	United States	The 37-foot (11.3 m) charter fishing vessel sank near the entrance to Cook Inlet on the south-central coast of Alaska, 8 nautical miles (15 km; 9.2 mi) south of Flat Island (56°18′49″N 133°19′41″W). United States Coast Guard helicopters rescued all eight people on board.

=== 8 July ===
List of shipwrecks: 8 July 1999
Ship	State	Description
Liftmar	Norway	The cargo ship foundered in the Atlantic Ocean 367 nautical miles (680 km) east of Cape Henry, Virginia, United States. Her eleven crew were rescued.

=== 9 July ===
List of shipwrecks: 9 July 1999
Ship	State	Description
Arktis Queen	Denmark	The cargo ship ship foundered in the South China Sea (13°23′S 67°05′E). Three of her crew were rescued, five were reported missing.
Excelsior Glory	Panama	The cargo ship struck a submerged object and sank 40 nautical miles (74 km) west of Burgos, Philippines (16°32′N 119°37′E). Her 22 crew were rescued.
Solhav	Norway	The cargo ship capsized at Foroy. Declared a constructive total loss, she arrived at Stokkøya on 17 December for scrapping.

=== 10 July ===
List of shipwrecks: 10 July 1999
Ship	State	Description
Kastri	Saint Vincent and the Grenadines	The cargo ship ran aground off Palmarola, Italy (40°55′N 12°15′E). Her crew were rescued. She was refloated on 15 July and taken in to Gaeta. Declared a constructive total loss, she was subsequently scrapped.

=== 11 July ===
List of shipwrecks: 11 July 1999
Ship	State	Description
Pelikan II	Panama	The bulk carrier suffered engine problems in the Indian Ocean 90 nautical miles (170 km) off Port Elizabeth, South Africa. Nineteen of her twenty crew were taken off on 13 July, her captain remaining aboard. She was towed in to Port Elizabeth. Declared a constructive total loss, she arrived at Alang, India on 22 November for scrapping.

=== 13 July ===
List of shipwrecks: 13 July 1999
Ship	State	Description
Bjorn	Panama	The bulk carrier ran aground in the Orinoco River. She was refloated on 22 July. Declared a constructive total loss, she arrived at Alang, India on 9 November for scrapping.
Equalizer	United States	The 32-foot (9.8 m) fishing vessel was destroyed in Bristol Bay off the coast of Alaska by an engine explosion and ensuing fire. The fishing vessel Butterfly (United States) rescued her entire crew of three.
Shin Hwa No.6	Taiwan	The cargo ship collided with the container ship Universal Island (Flag unknown) and sank.
Wanderer	United States	The 75-foot (22.9 m) salmon fishing vessel ran aground and sank in 480 feet (150 m) of water in Lynn Canal in Southeast Alaska after her captain fell asleep at the helm. All three people on board were rescued by the fishing vessel Riptide (United States).

=== 14 July ===
List of shipwrecks: 14 July 1999
Ship	State	Description
Humu	Nigeria	The ship sprang a leak in the Atlantic Ocean (4°24′N 4°20′E) and was presumed to have foundered. All 243 people on board were rescued.
Mastropetros	Greece	The cargo ship ran aground and sank in the Aegean Sea off Andros, Greece (37°52′17″N 24°44′48″E). Her crew were rescued.
USS William C. Lawe	United States Navy	The decommissioned Gearing-class destroyer was sunk as a target.

=== 17 July ===
List of shipwrecks: 17 July 1999
Ship	State	Description
Chang Yu	China	The bulk carrier collided with the chemical tanker Mee Yang (South Korea) in the Yangtse. She was towed in to Nantong, where she sank on 19 July. Her 33 crew were rescued.

=== 19 July ===
List of shipwrecks: 19 July 1999
Ship	State	Description
Belle-Tech	United States	The 38-foot (11.6 m) salmon-fishing vessel was wrecked on the Gilanta Rocks (54°51′00″N 130°56′30″W) in Dixon Entrance in Southeast Alaska. Her crew of two abandoned ship in a small boat and was rescued by the cutter USCGC Liberty ( United States Coast Guard).
Imperial Eagle	Malta	The former Gozo ferry was scuttled in the Mediterranean Sea off Qawra, Malta, as an artificial reef.

=== 23 July ===
List of shipwrecks: 24 July 1999
Ship	State	Description
Mary Anne	Philippines	Tropical Storm Helming: The tanker foundered in Manila Bay south west of Mariveles. A crew member was reported missing.

=== 24 July ===
List of shipwrecks: 24 July 1999
Ship	State	Description
Irish Sea	Bahamas	The refrigerated cargo ship ran aground on Bedwell Island, Western Australia (52°23′S 73°40′W). She was refloated on 31 July and towed to Talcahuano, Chile, arriving on 23 August. Declared a constructive total loss, she arrived at Alang, India on 26 January 2000 for scrapping.
Palli Hia Mariannu	South Africa	The fishing vessel foundered 100 nautical miles (190 km) off Plettenburg Bay. Nine of her 37 crew survived, three died and 25 were reported missing.

=== 25 July ===
List of shipwrecks: 25 July 1999
Ship	State	Description
Sea Dolphin	Saint Vincent and the Grenadines	The ro-ro ship suffered an engine failure in the Mediterranean Sea 16 nautical miles (30 km) north west of Malta. She was towed in to Malta. Declared a constructive total loss, she arrived at Aliağa, Turkey under tow on 19 September for scrapping.

=== 26 July ===
List of shipwrecks: 26 July 1999
Ship	State	Description
Pelmariner	Greece	The container ship collided with the container ship Pelranger (Flag unknown) and sank in the Mediterranean Sea (39°48′N 25°51′E) with the loss of a crew member.

=== 27 July ===
List of shipwrecks: 27 July 1999
Ship	State	Description
Madeira	Panama	The cargo ship became waterlogged in the Atlantic Ocean 18 nautical miles (33 km) north east of Las Palmas, Canary Islands. Her crew were taken off by a helicopter.

=== 28 July ===
List of shipwrecks: 28 July 1999
Ship	State	Description
Rofayda	Honduras	The cargo ship exploded and sank in the Mediterranean Sea 30 nautical miles (56 km) off Cape Greco, Cyprus (34°42′N 34°00′E). Six of her crew were rescued, two were reported missing.

=== 29 July ===
List of shipwrecks: 29 July 1999
Ship	State	Description
Havbas	Norway	The fishing vessel collided with the cruise ship Saga Rose (Bahamas) and sank 6 nautical miles (11 km) off Bremangerlandet (61°55′N 4°37′E). Her ten crew were rescued.

=== 31 July ===
List of shipwrecks: 31 July 1999
Ship	State	Description
Egoli	Panama	The container ship was gutted by fire at Guangzhou, China with the loss of five lives. Declared a constructive total loss, she was sold for scrapping.

=== Unknown date ===
List of shipwrecks: Unknown July 1999
Ship	State	Description
Sea Tiger	Republic of China	After her seizure (when named Yun Fong Seong No. 303) in Honolulu Harbor on 17 February 1992 for human trafficking of 93 Chinese illegal immigrants, the 168-foot (51.2 m) refrigerated cargo ship or commercial fishing vessel (according to different sources) was scuttled in Māmala Bay off Honolulu, Hawaii, west of Waikiki in 110 to 120 feet (34 to 37 m) of water to serve as an artificial reef.

== August ==
=== 3 August ===
List of shipwrecks: 3 August 1999
Ship	State	Description
Sam	Belize	The cargo ship sprang a leak in the Bay of Bengal. She was towed in to Chittagong, Bangladesh on 26 August. Declared a constructive total loss, she was consequently scrapped.

=== 7 August ===
List of shipwrecks: 7 August 1999
Ship	State	Description
Fontana	Cyprus	The cargo ship collided with Saigon I (Vietnam) at Chittagong, Bangladesh. Declared a constructive total loss, She arrived at Sitalpur, Banglades on 30 August for scrapping.

=== 8 August ===
List of shipwrecks: 8 August 1999
Ship	State	Description
Lady Bella	Bahamas	The cargo ship caught fire in the Pacific Ocean 1,200 nautical miles (2,200 km) off Hawaii, United States (33°54′N 174°24′W). Her crew were rescued by the bulk carrier Alicahue (Flag unknown). Lady Bella was towed to Oahu, Hawaii. Declared a constructive total loss, she departed on 1 September for Manzanillo, Mexico. She was subsequently scrapped.

=== 9 August ===
List of shipwrecks: 9 August 1999
Ship	State	Description
Ines	Belize	The tanker exploded, caught fire and sank 8 nautical miles (15 km) off Fujairah, United Arab Emirates with the loss of one of her 28 crew. Five people were reported missing.

=== 10 August ===
List of shipwrecks: 10 August 1999
Ship	State	Description
Golden Virgo	Belize	The cargo ship was driven ashore at Mukalla, Yemen. She was a total loss.

=== 14 August ===
List of shipwrecks: 14 August 1999
Ship	State	Description
Crest	United States	The 48-foot (14.6 m) salmon seiner capsized and sank in 360 feet (110 m) of water off Chasina Point (55°16′50″N 132°01′30″W) in Clarence Strait in the Alexander Archipelago in Southeast Alaska. Her crew of five abandoned ship in a skiff and survived.

=== 15 August ===
List of shipwrecks: 18 August 1999
Ship	State	Description
Charlotte	Panama	The fishing vessel was driven ashore west of Fornells, Menorca, Spain. She subsequently broke up.

=== 18 August ===
List of shipwrecks: 18 August 1999
Ship	State	Description
Gerda Maria	Germany	The fishing vessel caught fire in the North Sea (53°28′N 2°55′E) and was abandoned by her crew. She was towed in to IJmuiden, North Holland, Netherlands on 20 August. She was declared a total loss. She arrived at Gdynia, Poland for scrapping on 31 March 2000.
Sabine	Syria	The cargo ship was driven ashore at Tartous. She was a total loss.

=== 23 August ===
List of shipwrecks: 23 August 1999
Ship	State	Description
Meliksah	Turkey	The bulk carrier sprang a lean 16 nautical miles (30 km) off Dondra Head, Sri Lanka. Although taken in tow, she came ashore on 25 August and broke in two the next day. Her crew were rescued.

=== 24 August ===
List of shipwrecks: 24 August 1999
Ship	State	Description
Ever Decent	Panama	The container ship collided with the cruise ship Norwegian Dream (Bahamas) in the English Channel 17 nautical miles (31 km) off Margate, Kent, United Kingdom and caught fire. She was beached and all 40 crew were rescued by helicopter.

=== 25 August ===
List of shipwrecks: 25 August 1999
Ship	State	Description
Hang On	United States	The 34-foot (10.4 m) fishing vessel burned and sank in Bristol Bay off the coast of Alaska. An Alaska Department of Fish and Game vessel rescued the only person on board.

=== 29 August ===
List of shipwrecks: 29 August 1999
Ship	State	Description
Iris I	Saint Vincent and the Grenadines	The cargo ship foundered in the Atlantic Ocean (41°42′N 9°42′W), Her eight crew were rescued.

=== 30 August ===
List of shipwrecks: 30 August 1999
Ship	State	Description
Aggeliki P.	Cyprus	The bulk carrier ran aground in the Paraná River. She was refloated the next day.

== September ==
=== 1 September ===
List of shipwrecks: 1 September 1999
Ship	State	Description
Karya Sentosa	Indonesia	The cargo ship ran aground near Gahira, Bangladesh. She was looted and set afire on 5 September. The fire was extinguished but she was a total loss.
Sonja	Saint Vincent and the Grenadines	The cargo ship sprang a leak in the English Channel (50°38′00″N 1°04′03″W) She was towed in to Southampton, Hampshire, United Kingdom on 3 September. Declared a constructive total loss, she departed for Gijón, Spain for scrapping on 29 December.

=== 2 September ===
List of shipwrecks: 2 September 1999
Ship	State	Description
Tadoussac	Canada	The lake freighter collided with a bridge in the Welland Canal. Neither the ship nor the bridge received significant damage.

=== 3 September ===
List of shipwrecks: 4 September 1999
Ship	State	Description
Kristina	Malta	The cargo ship ran aground and sank in the Black Sea (44°20′N 33°30′E).

=== 4 September ===
List of shipwrecks: 4 September 1999
Ship	State	Description
Chubby	United States	The 29-foot (8.8 m) fishing vessel burned and sank 3 nautical miles (5.6 km; 3.5 mi) south of Haines, Alaska.

=== 5 September ===
List of shipwrecks: 8 September 1999
Ship	State	Description
Well Speeder	Saint Vincent and the Grenadines	The bulk carrier foundered in the Indian Ocean (20°23′S 56°26′E). Her crew were rescued.

=== 6 September ===
List of shipwrecks: 6 September 1999
Ship	State	Description
Slebech Two	United Kingdom	The fishing vessel foundered in the Atlantic Ocean (51°54′N 14°19′W).

=== 7 September ===
List of shipwrecks: 7 September 1999
Ship	State	Description
Aggeliki P.	Cyprus	The bulk carrier ran aground in the Paraná River. She was subsequently refloated. Declared a constructive total loss, she arrived at Alang, India under tow on 26 January 2000 for scrapping.

=== 8 September ===
List of shipwrecks: 8 September 1999
Ship	State	Description
Adalma 1	Nigeria	The tanker ran aground at Imagbon. She was subsequently vandalised and became a total loss.

=== 10 September ===
List of shipwrecks: 10 September 1999
Ship	State	Description
Jasper III	United Kingdom	The fishing vessel sprang a leak and foundered in the North Sea (58°58′N 0°50′W). Her six crew were rescued.

=== 11 September ===
List of shipwrecks: 11 September 1999
Ship	State	Description
Tug Electra	United States	The tug sank at Newport, Rhode Island.

=== 13 September ===
List of shipwrecks: 13 September 1999
Ship	State	Description
USCGC Red Oak	United States Coast Guard	The decommissioned coastal buoy tender was scuttled as an artificial reef in the North Atlantic Ocean off Cape May, New Jersey, in 65 feet (20 m) of water at 38°53.125′N 74°40.816′W.

=== 15 September ===
List of shipwrecks: 15 September 1999
Ship	State	Description
Gulf Majesty	United States	Hurricane Floyd: The tug foundered in the Atlantic Ocean 350 nautical miles (650 km) north east of Jacksonville, Florida. Her eight crew were rescued.

=== 17 September ===
List of shipwrecks: 17 September 1999
Ship	State	Description
Arnstein	Norway	The cargo ship caught fire in Hjorungfjord. She was towed to Vartdal. Her four crew were rescued. Declared a constructive total loss, she was subsequently converted to a barge.

=== 19 September ===
List of shipwrecks: 19 September 1999
Ship	State	Description
Alexandria C	United States	After a fire broke out in her engine room while she was moored alongside other vessels at Old Harbor, Alaska, the 39-gross ton, 56-foot (17.1 m) salmon-fishing vessel′s was towed away from the other vessels and beached. Attempts to bring the fire under control failed, and she burned to the waterline, becoming a total loss.

=== 20 September ===
List of shipwrecks: 20 September 1999
Ship	State	Description
Ormaza	Spain	The fishing vessel ran aground on the Isle of Lewis, United Kingdom. Her crew were rescued.

=== 23 September ===
List of shipwrecks: 23 September 1999
Ship	State	Description
Northern Traveler	United States	While no one was on board, the 29-foot (8.8 m) longline halibut-fishing vessel sank at Round Island (58°36′N 159°58′W) in Bristol Bay off the coast of Alaska.

=== 24 September ===
List of shipwrecks: 26 September 1999
Ship	State	Description
Fukuyoshi Maru No.18	Japan	The fishing vessel was driven ashore at Yamaguchi. She was a total loss.
Sea Hope	South Korea	Typhoon Bart: The cargo ship was driven ashore on Honshū, Japan (34°02′N 131°46′E). Declared a total loss, she was broken up in situ.
Smilly	Panama	Typhoon Bart: The refrigerated cargo ship was wrecked in Kagoshima Bay.

=== 26 September ===
List of shipwrecks: 26 September 1999
Ship	State	Description
Avra K.	Panama	The cargo ship was towed in to Koper, Slovenia with engine damage. She was declared a constructive total loss. She arrived at Aliağa, Turkey on 11 December for scrapping.

=== 28 September ===
List of shipwrecks: 28 September 1999
Ship	State	Description
Laurentine III	United States	The fishing vessel foundered in the Gulf of Mexico 10 nautical miles (19 km) south of Sabine, Texas.

=== Unknown date ===
List of shipwrecks: Unknown date in September 1999
Ship	State	Description
Doxa	Bahamas	The chemical tanker suffered an engine failure in the Arabian Sea on or about 15 September. She was towed in to Mundra, India on 26 September. Declared a constructive total loss, She arrive at Alang, India on 28 August 2000 for scrapping.

== October ==
=== 1 October ===
List of shipwrecks: 1 October 1999
Ship	State	Description
Rachel Harvey	(United Kingdom) Jersey	The fishing vessel struck rocks in stormy seas 200 yards (180 m) off Peninnis Head in the Isles of Scilly and was wrecked. All six crew members were rescued, but one was pronounced dead on arrival at a hospital.

=== 4 October ===
List of shipwrecks: 4 October 1999
Ship	State	Description
Mundogas Europe	Liberia	The LPG tanker exploded and caught fire at Subic, Philippines with the loss of five lives. She was declared a constructive total loss and departed for Xinhui, China on 12 April 2000 for scrapping.
Weser Ore	Liberia	The combination carrier ran aground in the Turbarāo River, Brazil. She was refloated on 24 November. Declared a constructive total loss, she arrived at Beilun, China for scrapping on 6 April 2000.

=== 5 October ===
List of shipwrecks: 5 October 1999
Ship	State	Description
Junior M.	Egypt	The cargo ship sprang a leak in Saint Brieuc Bay. She was taken in to Brest, Finistère, France the next day. Declared a constructive total loss, she arrived at Aliağa Turkey on 21 August 2000 for scrapping.

=== 8 October ===
List of shipwrecks: 8 October 1999
Ship	State	Description
Ocean Wave	Panama	The bulk carrier ran aground 50 nautical miles (93 km) south of the Port of Mongla, Bangladesh. She subsequently broke in two. All 24 crew were rescued.

=== 10 October ===
List of shipwrecks: 10 October 1999
Ship	State	Description
Maridive XII	Egypt	The offshore supply vessel foundered in the Mediterranean Sea off Baltim with the loss of three of her crew.

=== 11 October ===
List of shipwrecks: 11 October 1999
Ship	State	Description
Sanaga	Panama	The bulk carrier sprang a leak in the Indian Ocean 700 nautical miles (1,300 km) east north east of Durban, South Africa and was abandoned by her crew (27°51′04″S 43°34′02″E). Presumed subsequently foundered.

=== 15 October ===
List of shipwrecks: 18 October 1999
Ship	State	Description
Ecowas Trader II	Nigeria	The cargo ship foundered in the Atlantic Ocean 100 nautical miles (190 km) off the coast of Guinea-Bissau (12°40′00″N 19°53′05″W). Her seventeen crew were rescued.

=== 18 October ===
List of shipwrecks: 18 October 1999
Ship	State	Description
HMAS Bayonet	Royal Australian Navy	The decommissioned Attack-class patrol boat was scuttled in Bass Strait off Cape Schank, Victoria, Australia.
Bimas Raya II	Indonesia	The ship foundered off Western New Guinea There were 38 survivors from the 159 people on board. Fifteen people died and 136 were reported missing.

=== 19 October ===
List of shipwrecks: 19 October 1999
Ship	State	Description
Courage	Saint Vincent and the Grenadines	The cargo ship was driven ashore at São Jacinto, Portugal (40°39′N 8°45′W). Her eighteen crew were rescued She broke in two on 22 October.
Galapagos Discovery	Ecuador	The passenger ship caught fire at Balboa, Panama. She sank the next day.

=== 20 October ===
List of shipwrecks: 20 October 1999
Ship	State	Description
Henry Navigator	Cyprus	The cargo ship capsized and sank off Bok Point, South Africa. Her twenty crew were rescued.
KM Bimas Raya II	Indonesia	The ship sank west of New Guinea with the loss of about 275 lives. Twenty-six survivors were reported.

=== 21 October ===
List of shipwrecks: 21 October 1999
Ship	State	Description
Borak	Croatia	The cargo ship foundered in the Adriatic Sea off Zlarin with the loss of two of her five crew.
God’s Will	United States	During a voyage from False Pass to King Cove, Alaska, the 85-foot (25.9 m) fishing trawler sank 15 nautical miles (28 km; 17 mi) southwest of Cold Bay, Alaska. A United States Coast Guard helicopter rescued the only person aboard from a life raft in Cold Bay.
Marva Anne	United States	The 58-foot (17.7 m) longline halibut-fishing vessel sank in Stephens Passage in the Alexander Archipelago in Southeast Alaska 2.5 nautical miles (4.6 km; 2.9 mi) west of Security Bay (56°53′N 134°21′W). Her crew of two put on survival suits and abandoned ship in a life raft, from which the fishing vessel Celtic Air (United States) rescued them.

=== 28 October ===
List of shipwrecks: 28 October 1999
Ship	State	Description
Sol Kair	Norway	The cargo ship ran aground in Follafjord. She was refloated and taken in to Moen. Declared a construtive total loss, she was scrapped at Stokkøya.

=== 29 October ===
List of shipwrecks: 30 October 1999
Ship	State	Description
Baris	Turkey	The cargo ship sprang a leak north east of Cape Apostolos Andreas, Cyprus. She foundered 6 nautical miles (11 km) off Famagusta the next day. Her crew were rescued.
Dubai Oasis	Saint Vincent and the Grenadines	The cargo ship was abandoned in the Indian Ocean (16°36′N 87°36′E). Her crew were rescued by the chemical tanker Jo Clipper (Netherlands).

=== 30 October ===
List of shipwrecks: 30 October 1999
Ship	State	Description
Polar Star	United States	With no one on board, the derelict 50-foot (15.2 m) longline fishing vessel sank in Thompson Harbor at Sitka, Alaska.
T-Mike	United States	The 65-foot (19.8 m) fishing vessel was destroyed in Blying Sound on the coast of Alaska 10 nautical miles (19 km; 12 mi) northeast of McArthur Pass by a fire attributed to a leaking fuel line. Both crew members escaped in a life raft, and a United States Coast Guard helicopter rescued them.

=== 31 October ===
List of shipwrecks: 31 October 1999
Ship	State	Description
Orcas	United States	With no one aboard, the derelict 65-foot (19.8 m) fishing vessel sank in Thompson Harbor at Sitka, Alaska.

== November ==
=== 2 November ===
List of shipwrecks: 2 November 1999
Ship	State	Description
Mighty Servant 2	Netherlands Antilles	The semi-submersible heavy lift ship struck an uncharted rock and capsized off Singkep, Indonesia with the loss of five of her twenty crew. She was raised in 2000 and subsequently scrapped at Alang, India.

=== 3 November ===
List of shipwrecks: 3 November 1999
Ship	State	Description
Fixed Star	Panama	The cargo ship ran aground at Havana, Cuba (23°09′35″N 82°21′13″W). She was refloated on 23 November. Declared a constructive total loss. She arrived at Veracruz, Mexico for scrapping on 31 December.
Mistress	United States	The 42-foot (12.8 m) crab-fishing vessel capsized and sank in bad weather in the vicinity of Cape Fanshaw (57°11′N 133°33′W) near Petersburg, Alaska. All three people on board – a man and his son and daughter – perished.

=== 5 November ===
List of shipwrecks: 5 November 1999
Ship	State	Description
Bajorai	Lithuania	The fishing vessel was driven ashore on Bornholm, Denmark (55°03′N 15°08′E). She was a total loss.
Bird	United States	Authorities deemed the 52-foot (15.8 m) sailboat to have been lost on this date along with the only person on board in Glacier Bay in Southeast Alaska.
Dolly	Dominica	The cargo ship sprang a leak and foundered in the Atlantic Ocean (14°40′28″N 60°51′13″W). Her six crew were rescued.
El Guanche	Spain	The tug foundered. She was being towed from Tenerife, Canary Islands to Vigo.
Mitrofania	United States	The fishing vessel was driven ashore on Cape Kasiak, Alaska (57°04′N 53°29′W). She was refloated and beached at Kodiak, Alaska. She was a total loss.

=== 7 November ===
List of shipwrecks: 7 November 1999
Ship	State	Description
Dole America	Liberia	The refrigerated cargo ship collided with the Nab Tower in the Solent and ran aground.
Semele	Belize	The cargo ship collided with the bulk carrier Shipka (Flag unknown) and sank in the Sea of Marmara. Her eighteen crew were rescued.

=== 9 November ===
List of shipwrecks: 9 November 1999
Ship	State	Description
Alican Deval	Turkey	The cargo ship foundered off Rize. Five of her crew were rescued, seven were reported missing.
Chil Bosan	South Korea	The fishing vessel ran aground in the Bering Sea (60°27′N 169°30′E). Her crew were rescued. She was a total loss.
Dubai Oasis	Saint Vincent and the Grenadines	The cargo ship foundered in the Indian Ocean.
Young Chemi	Belize	The chemical tanker foundered in the East China Sea (34°54′N 129°02′E) with the loss of a crew member and two reported missing.

=== 10 November ===
List of shipwrecks: 10 November 1999
Ship	State	Description
Kostis	Honduras	The cargo ship sank at Piraeus, Greece.

=== 12 November ===
List of shipwrecks: 12 November 1999
Ship	State	Description
Deonne	Trinidad and Tobago	The cargo ship sank off Chaguaramas.
Simba	Georgia	The cargo ship was driven ashore at Port-la-Nouvelle, Aude, France. She was later refloated and taken to Sète, Hérault, France, where she arrived on 23 April 2000. Declared a constructive total loss, she arrived at Aliağa, Turkey on 26 October 2000 for scrapping.
Xlendi	Malta	The former Gozo ferry was scuttled in the Mediterranean Sea off Xatt l-Aħmar, Gozo as an artificial reef.

=== 13 November ===
List of shipwrecks: 18 November 1999
Ship	State	Description
Voskhod	Russia	The fishing vessel ran aground in the Gulf of Finland. Her crew were rescued by helicopter. She was a total loss.

=== 16 November ===
List of shipwrecks: 16 November 1999
Ship	State	Description
Zalcosea II	Belize	The cargo ship was wrecked off Tema, Ghana.

=== 18 November ===
List of shipwrecks: 18 November 1999
Ship	State	Description
#335	United States	The retired 80-foot (24.4 m) steel-hulled barge was scuttled as an artificial reef in the North Atlantic Ocean south of Long Island 2.5 nautical miles (4.6 km; 2.9 mi) off Moriches Inlet, New York.

=== 24 November ===
List of shipwrecks: 24 November 1999
Ship	State	Description
Dashun	China	According to a Chinese Transport Ministry official document, the ferry departed from Yantai Port for Dalian Port, but capsized off Jianggezhuang Township, Muping District, Yantai, Shandong Province, China, with 302 passengers and crew on board. 22 people were rescued and the remaining 280 people were drowned.

=== 25 November ===
List of shipwrecks: 25 November 1999
Ship	State	Description
Eliza	Marshall Islands	The cargo ship caught fire and exploded and sank in the Indian Ocean (10°21′09″N 84°13′00″E). Her crew were rescued by the tanker Rabindranath Tagore (India).

=== 26 November ===
List of shipwrecks: 26 November 1999
Ship	State	Description
Emma Jane	United Kingdom	The fishing vessel foundered in the North Sea (58°11′03″N 0°29′09″W) Her six crew were rescued.
Salaj	Romania	The cargo ship was beached at Port Mohammad Bin Qasim, Pakistan. Declared a constructive total loss, she departed for Gadani Beach, Pakistan for scrapping on 27 January 2000.
Sleipner	Norway	The catamaran ferry struck a rock and sank off Haugesund, Rogaland with the loss of sixteen of the 85 people on board.

=== 27 November ===
List of shipwrecks: 26 November 1999
Ship	State	Description
Havsoki	Faroe Islands	The fishing vessel ran aground in the North Sea (55°08′N 8°24′E). She was refloated but consequently sank. Her four crew were rescued. The wreck was refloated in April 2000 and scrapped at Esbjerg, Denmark.

=== Unknown date ===
List of shipwrecks: Unknown date in November 1999
Ship	State	Description
Seefalk	Belize	The tanker foundered at New Caledonia between 16 and 23 November.

== December ==
=== 1 December ===
List of shipwrecks: 1 December 1999
Ship	State	Description
Palatin	Antigua and Barbuda	The cargo ship foundered in the Atlantic Ocean 114 nautical miles (211 km) west of Vigo, Spain. Her fourteen crew survived.

=== 3 December ===
List of shipwrecks: 3 December 1999
Ship	State	Description
Avacha-101	Russia	The fishing vessel ran aground off East Sakhalin Island (48°46′26″N 144°02′19″E) and caught fire. Her crew were rescued. She was a total loss.
Waldorf	United States	The retired 110-foot (33.5 m) crane barge was scuttled as an artificial reef in the North Atlantic Ocean 4 nautical miles (7.4 km; 4.6 mi) off Holgate, New Jersey, at 39°28.780′N 074°11.084′W.

=== 6 December ===
List of shipwrecks: 6 December 1999
Ship	State	Description
Athos	Malta	The chemical tanker suffered an onboard explosion at Kalamata, Greece which killed a crew member, with another reported missing. She was declared a constructive total loss. She arrived at Gadani Beach, Pakistan on 15 June 2000 for scrapping.

=== 9 December ===
List of shipwrecks: 9 December 1999
Ship	State	Description
Anyo Maru #1	Japan	The 190-foot (57.9 m) fishing trawler sank with the loss of 12 lives in the Bering Sea 120 nautical miles (220 km; 140 mi) south of Cape Navarin (62.2778°N 179.0961°E) on the coast of Siberia and 180 nautical miles (330 km; 210 mi) west of Saint Matthew Island. There were 24 survivors.
Hatafulu Maru No.58	Japan	The dredger collided with Alice (Flag unknown) and sank in the Indian Ocean (34°23′N 134°01′E). Four crew were rescued, one was reported missing. She was subsequently refloated, and was scrapped at Etajima in July 2000.

=== 7 December ===
List of shipwrecks: 7 December 1999
Ship	State	Description
Yalikoy II	Turkey	The cargo ship collided with a Russian tug and sank in the Black Sea 120 nautical miles (220 km) north east of Eregli. Her ten crew were rescued.

=== 9 December ===
List of shipwrecks: 9 December 1999
Ship	State	Description
Anyo Maru No.1	Japan	The fishing vessel foundered in the Bering Sea 104 nautical miles (192 km)) south of Cape Navarin, Russia. Twenty-four of her 36 crew were rescued, twelve were reported missing.

=== 11 December ===
List of shipwrecks: 11 December 1999
Ship	State	Description
Northern Hope	Panama	The cargo ship foundered in the Pacific Ocean.

=== 12 December ===
List of shipwrecks: 12 December 1999
Ship	State	Description
Erika	Malta	The tanker broke in two and sank in the Bay of Biscay off Penmarc'h, Finistère, France (47°10′N 4°36′W). Her 26 crew were rescued.

=== 15 December ===
List of shipwrecks: 15 December 1999
Ship	State	Description
Asuncion Reefer	Paraguay	The refrigerated cargo ship ran aground in the Paraná River downstream of Asunción, Paraguay. She was a total loss.
Canton de Cora	Spain	The fishing vessel collided with the refrigerated cargo ship Ducado (Honduras) and sank in the Atlantic Ocean 50 nautical miles (93 km) off the coast of Mauretania. Her seventeen crew were rescued.
Violet Ocean	Panama	The cargo ship foundered in the South China Sea (22°49′N 117°18′E). Her crew were rescued.

=== 16 December ===
List of shipwrecks: 16 December 1999
Ship	State	Description
Capricorn	Saint Vincent and the Grenadines	The cargo ship capsized and sank in the Caribbean Sea 90 nautical miles (170 km) north west of Aruba (15°39′N 71°11′W) with the loss of one of her twelve crew.
Donal Paraic	Malta	The cargo ship foundered in the Atlantic Ocean 36 nautical miles (67 km) north west of A Coruña, Spain (43°35′03″N 9°17′05″W) with the loss of two of her six crew. One person was reported missing.

=== 18 December ===
List of shipwrecks: 18 December 1999
Ship	State	Description
Koho Maru No.2	Japan	The cargo ship ran aground and sank at Shimoda.

=== 19 December ===
List of shipwrecks: 21 December 1999
Ship	State	Description
Carvela	United Kingdom	The fishing vessel sprang a leak, capsized, and sank in the North Sea 60 nautical miles (110 km) north east of Fraserburgh, Aberdeenshire. Her six crew were rescued.

=== 21 December ===
List of shipwrecks: 21 December 1999
Ship	State	Description
Xin Zhu Jiang	China	The bulk carrier foundered in the South China Sea (23°40′N 119°59′E). Twenty-eight of her crew were rescued, one was reported missing.

=== 22 December ===
List of shipwrecks: 22 December 1999
Ship	State	Description
Mercs Maho	Sri Lanka	The ship sank 1 nautical mile (1.9 km) off Kankesanthurai. All on board were rescued.

=== 23 December ===
List of shipwrecks: 23 December 1999
Ship	State	Description
Asia South Korea	Philippines	The ferry struck a reef, capsized and sank 10 nautical miles (19 km) off Bantayan Island. Of the 600 people on board, 58 were killed,

=== 24 December ===
List of shipwrecks: 24 December 1999
Ship	State	Description
Barde Team	Norway	The cargo ship sprang a leak and foundered in the South China Sea (6°01′S 78°38′E). Her crew were rescued.

=== 25 December ===
List of shipwrecks: 25 December 1999
Ship	State	Description
Hedlo	Bahamas	The cargo ship was driven ashore on Urter Island, Norway (59°21′N 5°01′E). Her seven crew were rescued. She was a total loss.

=== 27 December ===
List of shipwrecks: 27 December 1999
Ship	State	Description
Lady Hadil	Syria	The cargo ship ran aground at Irwad Island. She was a total loss.

=== 29 December ===
List of shipwrecks: 29 December 1999
Ship	State	Description
Volgoneft-248	Russia	A storm broke the tanker in two in the Sea of Marmara off Istanbul, Turkey. The forward section sank, and the aft section was driven ashore.

=== 30 December ===
List of shipwrecks: 30 December 1999
Ship	State	Description
Terri-Lynn	United States	The fishing vessel foundered in the Atlantic Ocean 3 nautical miles (5.6 km) off the Schoodic Peninsula, Maine. Both crew were rescued.

=== 31 December ===
List of shipwrecks: 31 December 1999
Ship	State	Description
Samaret Jama	Belize	The cargo ship sank at Puerto Cabello, Venezuela.
Seven Seas	Syria	The cargo ship foundered in the Mediterranean Sea (34°24′N 34°06′E). Her crew were rescued.
Tombstone	United States	The 35-foot (10.7 m) pleasure craft ran aground on the northwest side of Shelter Island in the Alexander Archipelago in Southeast Alaska and sank. A United States Coast Guard rescue boat rescued both people on board.

== Unknown date ==
List of shipwrecks: Unknown date 1999
Ship	State	Description
Lauren Rose	United States	The 33-foot (10.1 m) gillnet fishing vessel was destroyed by fire on the Copper River Flats on the south-central coast of Alaska on either 28 April or 28 May. The only person aboard survived.
Mr. J	United States	The crab processor – a former PCE-842-class patrol craft and auxiliary minelayer – was towed out into the Pacific Ocean and scuttled sometime in the 1990s.
