= Bulgaria (1955 ship) =

Russian cruise ship

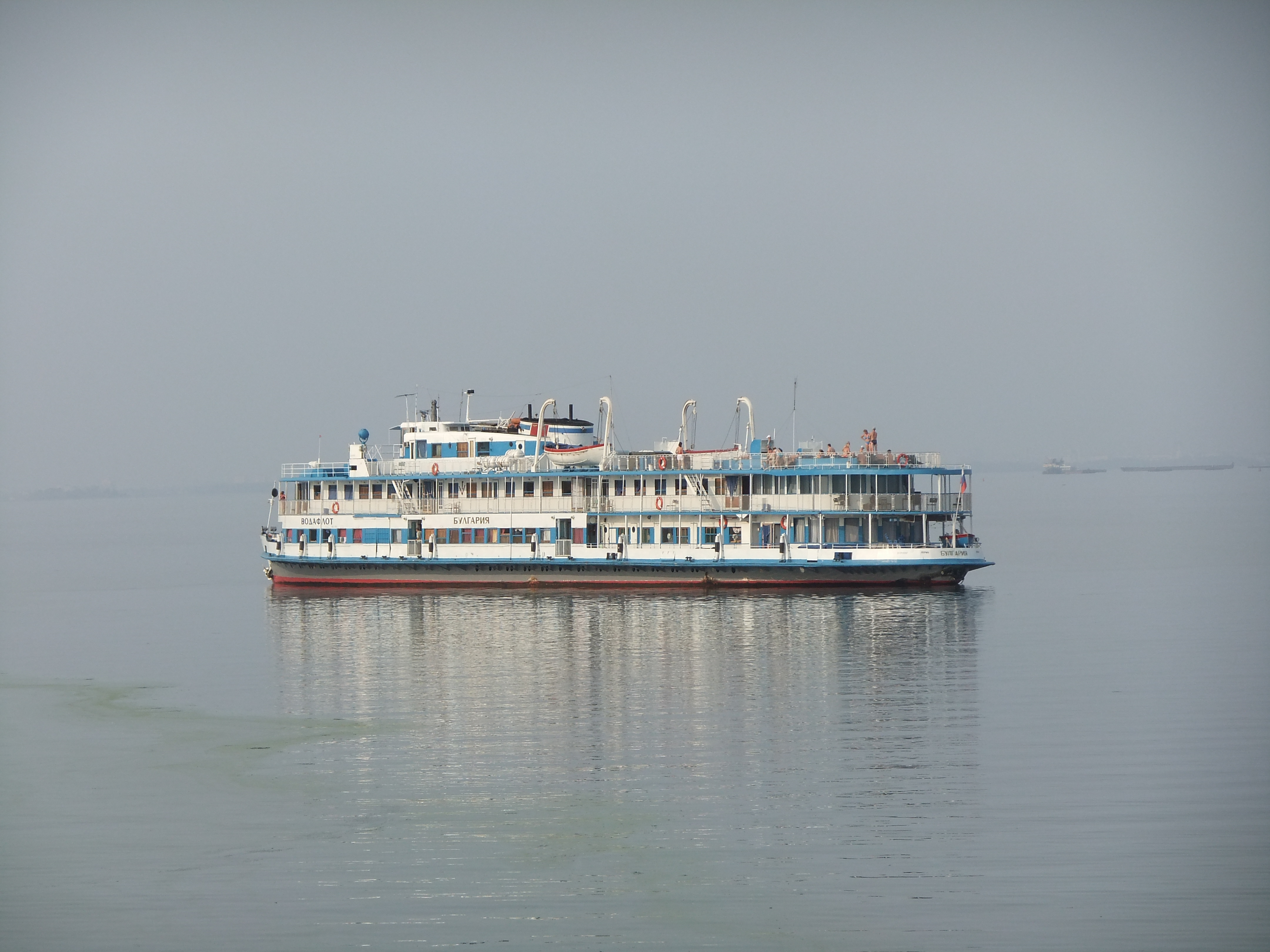
- Bulgaria on 8 August 2010
- Name: 1955–2010: Ukraina; 2010–2011: Bulgaria
- Owner: OAO SK Kamskoye Rechnoye Parohodstvo (ОАО СК Камское речное пароходство)
- Port of registry: 1955–1962: Gorky, Soviet Union; 1962–1993: Perm, Soviet Union; 1993–2011: Perm, Russia
- Builder: Slovenské lodenice Komárno a.s. Komárno, Czechoslovakia
- Yard number: 416
- Launched: 1955
- Out of service: 10 July 2011
- Fate: Sank 10 July 2011

General characteristics
- Class & type: 785/OL800 (in Slovakia)
- Type: River cruise ship
- Tonnage: 1,003
- Length: 80.2 m (263 ft)
- Beam: 12.5 m (41 ft)
- Draught: 1.9 m (6.2 ft)
- Decks: 2
- Installed power: 546 kilowatts (732 hp)
- Propulsion: diesel-electric, two engines
- Speed: 20.5 km/h (12.7 mph; 11.1 kn)
- Capacity: 233

Bulgaria (Russian: Булга́рия, romanized: Bulgariya) was a class 785/OL800 Russian river cruise ship (built in Komárno, Czechoslovakia) which operated in the Volga-Don basin. On 10 July 2011, Bulgaria sank in the Kuybyshev Reservoir of the Volga River near Syukeyevo, Kamsko-Ustyinsky District, Tatarstan, Russia, with 201 passengers and crew aboard when sailing from the town of Bolgar to the regional capital, Kazan. The catastrophe led to 122 confirmed deaths (bodies recovered and identified).

The sinking of Bulgaria was Russia's worst maritime disaster since 1986, when the SS Admiral Nakhimov collided with a cargo ship and 423 people died.

== Ship ==
Bulgaria was built at a Slovak shipyard in Komárno, Czechoslovakia, in 1955 as Ukraina, and was renamed Bulgaria in February 2010 after the Volga Bulgaria. Her length was 80.2 metres (263 ft), her beam was 12.5 metres (41 ft), her draft was 1.9 metres (6.2 ft), and her power output was 273 kilowatts (366 hp). She had two engines and two decks. Her cruising speed was 20.5 kilometres per hour (12.7 mph; 11.1 kn), and her original passenger capacity was 233 (later reduced after overhaul).

== Sinking ==
On 10 July 2011, Bulgaria was traveling in Tatarstan on the Volga River when she was caught in a storm and sank at about 13:58 Moscow time (09:58 UTC), several hours after beginning her cruise.

Survivors say that during the cruise, Bulgaria encountered stormy weather, and listed sharply to starboard. This was apparently compounded by the captain trying to turn the boat around, and soon water rushed into the vessel through portholes that had been opened due to the ship's lack of air conditioning. According to a survivor, the sinking came without warning, and the vessel "listed to starboard ... and capsized and sank." The boat sank within minutes, plunging nearly 20 metres (66 ft) to the river bed. The sinking occurred about 3 kilometres (1.9 mi) from shore, in the Kamsko-Ustyinsky District.

=== Casualties ===
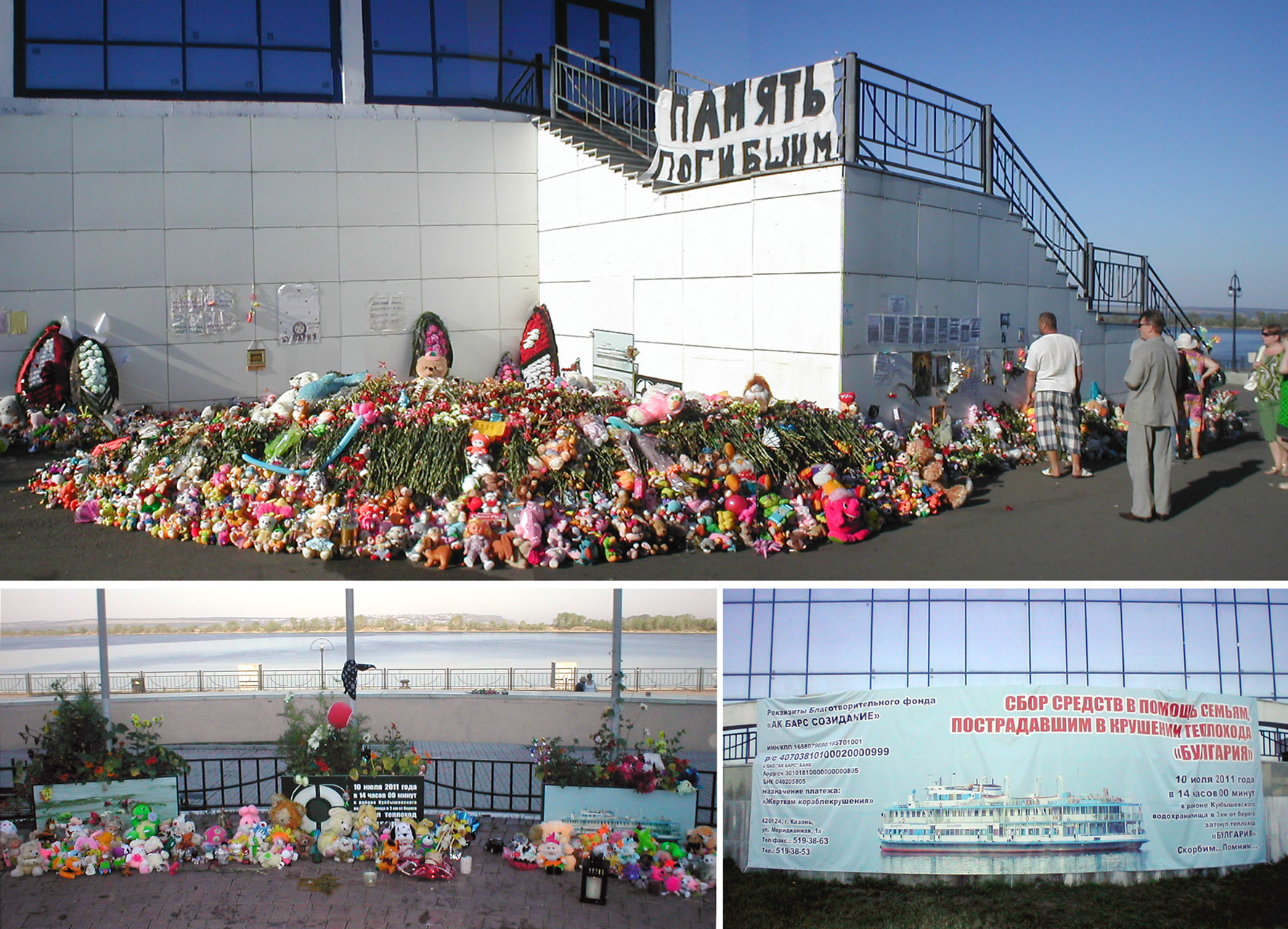
People's memorial in Kazan riverport

At the time of the incident, Bulgaria's total complement of passengers and crew is estimated to have been at 201, though she was only rated to carry 120. On 11 July 2011, a government official from the Ministry of Emergency Situations said that the likelihood of finding additional survivors was slim, leaving a presumed total of up to 129 dead. On 12 July 2011, the divers recovered bodies of captain Alexander Ostrovsky and his spouse. As of 25 July 2011, the officially confirmed death toll was 122, with all bodies found so far identified. Among the dead were believed to be at least 50 children.

Seventy-nine people (56 passengers and 23 crew members) were reported to have survived. Of those, 76 were rescued by the cruise ship Arabella, a few others were saved by other boats, and one swam to the shore.

Dead and injured by country
Nationality	Dead	Injured
(Russia) Russian	120	13
(Belarus) Belarusian	2	1
Total	122	14

=== Passed ships ===
According to survivors' accounts, two ships (the oil tanker Volgoneft-104 [other sources claim it could have been the Volgoneft-38] and the freighter Arbat) passed by after the Bulgaria had sunk. The passing ships did not stop to help and the ICRF launched an official investigation into these claims.

In accordance with Russian criminal code article 270, the captain of a ship that refuses to help in disaster could be sentenced to up to two years of deprivation of freedom. However, these ships, being heavy freight barges with minimal crews, were not technically capable of stopping while passing, nor of turning back in an acceptable time. The barge owners refused to comment. The technical reasons may not be sufficient to justify the refusal, as article 270 of the Russian criminal code allows the only reason to refuse help as when it could endanger a ship or its crew or passengers. Assistance from the towboat Dunaisky 66, which was towing two barges, was refused by Arabella's captain who believed that the towboat would not have provided useful help and would only have hindered the rescue. Both Volgoneft-104 and Volgoneft-38 are equipped with life boats and, while coordinates are not precisely tracked, were in the region of the accident.

=== Cause ===
On 11 July, an anonymous source close to the committee investigating the sinking said that the likely cause was portholes that were opened because of the lack of air conditioning on the vessel, which allowed water to enter Bulgaria when the captain attempted to turn the ship during stormy weather.

Evidence suggested that a number of safety violations could have caused or compounded the disaster. According to one survivor, emergency exit doors on the boat had been sealed or locked shut. Investigators also suggested that the boat set sail with a list to the right, possibly due to full sewage or fuel tanks on that side, and with one of its engines not properly functioning. According to investigators, sailing with a malfunctioning engine is a serious violation of passenger boat regulations. Some survivors told Russian news agencies that they begged the captain to turn around because of the list, but were ignored. There were conflicting reports about whether the boat and the cruise operator were properly licensed for passenger cruises. Survivors from the crew claimed that Bulgaria had lost electric power minutes before she sank, which effectively disabled ship controls, and prevented the crew from making a distress call over radio. For some unknown reason the emergency power did not come on. It was not until Arabella picked up the first survivors that authorities found out the name of the vessel and the true scale of the disaster.

While the ship was not licensed to carry the number of passengers that were on board, she probably was not technically overloaded as in the past she had been tested with as many as 2,000 passengers.

=== Government reaction ===
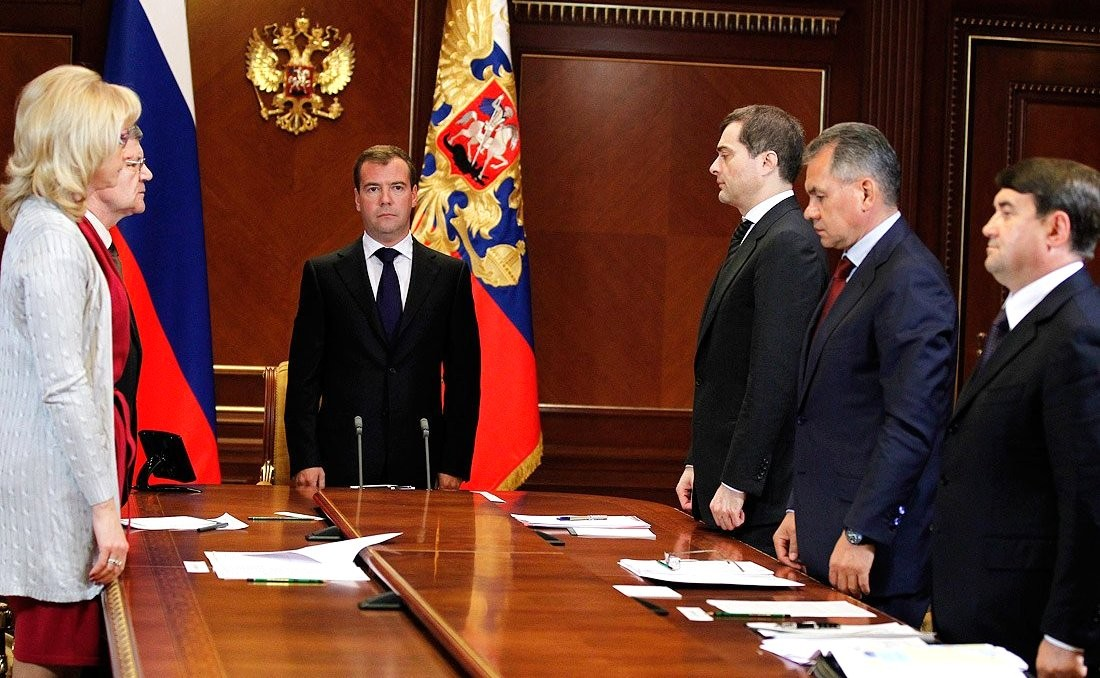
Russian president Dmitry Medvedev holds a moment of silence, 11 July 2011.

President Dmitry Medvedev on 11 July ordered "a complete check on all means of passenger transport" in Russia in response to the sinking of Bulgaria, and also declared 12 July a national day of mourning for those killed in the incident.

== See also ==
- Alexander Suvorov (ship)
- List of river cruise ships
