= Volgoneft-139 =

Russian oil tanker that broke in two in 2007

History
- Name: Volgoneft-139
- Owner: Volgotanker
- Port of registry: 1978 (Soviet Union) Astrakhan; 1991 (Russia) Astrakhan
- Builder: SSRZ "Ivan Dimitrov", Ruse
- Yard number: 74
- Completed: 1978
- Identification: IMO number: 8849608; Soviet registration number 161690; call sign UHWV
- Fate: broke in two, 11 November 2007

General characteristics
- Class & type: Project 550A oil tanker
- Tonnage: 3,463 GT, 4,190 DWT
- Displacement: 6,513 tonnes
- Length: 132.6 m (435 ft)
- Beam: 16.9 m (55 ft)
- Draught: 3.62 m (11.9 ft) laden
- Depth: 5.5 m (18 ft)
- Decks: 1
- Installed power: 2 × diesel engines; 2 × 736 kW
- Propulsion: 2 × screws
- Speed: 11 knots (20 km/h)
- Crew: 22 or 23

MV Volgoneft-139 (Волгонефть-139) was a Project 550A Volgoneft oil tanker that was owned and operated by Volgotanker. She was built in Bulgaria for the Soviet Union in 1978. A storm in the Kerch Strait in 2007 broke her in two, spilling her cargo into the sea. Her bow sank, and her stern section was later scrapped. Her spilt cargo caused a major pollution incident.

== Description ==
Project 550A is a Soviet design of tanker that was intended for "mixed navigation": operating on the canals and large navigable rivers of European Russia; and also short-sea shipping in favourable sea conditions, with waves no more than 2 metres (6 ft 7 in) high. The "Ivan Dimitrov" shipyard in Ruse, Bulgaria built many of them. Volgoneft-139 was built as yard number 74, and completed in 1978. Her length was 132.6 m (435 ft); her beam 16.9 m (55 ft); and her depth 5.5 m (18 ft). When laden with a full cargo of 4,875 tonnes of kerosene, her draught was 3.62 m (11.9 ft), and she displaced 6,513 tonnes. She had two fixed-pitch screws, each driven by a 8NVD48A diesel engine rated at 736 kW. Her twin engines gave her a speed of 11 knots (20 km/h). She also had twin rudders. She had berths for 22 or 23 crew.

Volgoneft-139 was registered in Astrakhan, on the Volga river. Her IMO number was 8849608; her Soviet registration number was 161690; and her call sign was UHWV.

== Loss ==
On the morning of 11 November 2007, a storm hit the Black Sea. In the Kerch Strait, the storm sank four ships, ran six aground, and damaged two tankers. Volgoneft-139 was in the Kerch Strait, carrying a cargo of 4,077 tons of oil. She was hit by waves 5 metres (18 ft) high – more than twice the height that she was designed to withstand. At about 04:45 hrs, her bow broke off and sank, and 1,300 tonnes of her cargo of fuel oil spilled into the sea, causing a major pollution incident. The spill later increased to about 3,000 tons of oil. Her stern section stayed afloat, and was later towed to port.

One of the tankers damaged in the same storm was Volgoneft-123: another Project 550A ship. Her hull cracked; and some of her cargo leaked into the sea; but she stayed afloat.

== Oil spill ==
Interfax quoted Alexander Tkachyov, the Governor of Krasnodar Krai, as saying that 30,000 seabirds were covered with oil, and would probably die. On 26 November 2007, Russia's Ministry of Emergency Situations stated that it had cleaned 46.3 kilometres (28.8 miles) of coast, and that 27,994 tonnes of oily waste; 332 litres of emulsified oil and water; and 5,142 dead birds had been collected.

However, some of the oil had not been removed. In April 2008, "hundreds, if not thousands, of tons" of mixed oil and seaweed still lay on the beaches of the Taman Peninsula. Local residents were using spades and pitchforks to try to remove the pollution before that year's tourist season began. That June, environmentalists found concentrations of oil pollution around Port Kavkaz, including 300 bags of oily waste that had been bagged but then abandoned. On the southern part of the Chushka Spit they found no sign of the oil being removed. This area includes the ecologically sensitive Taman-Zaporozhye nature reserve, which is a breeding ground for both fish and birds, and a stopping point for migrating birds.

More continued to leak from Volgoneft-139's wreck during 2008. That July, Academician Gennady Matyushov of the Russian Academy of Sciences reported that the wreck was still producing a plume of oil two miles long. That November, Yevgeny Bubnov, head of Crimea's Republican Committee for Environmental Protection, said that it was impossible to clear all of the oil pollution from the water and the Crimean coast of the Kerch Strait.

== See also ==
- MV Volgoneft-248, a Volgotanker ship that broke in two in the Sea of Marmara in 1999.
