= Tenishevo =

Tenishevo (Russian: Тенишево) is the name of several inhabited localities in Russia.

== Modern localities ==
Urban localities

- Tenishevo, Republic of Tatarstan, an urban-type settlement in Kamsko-Ustyinsky District of the Republic of Tatarstan

Rural localities

- Tenishevo, Republic of Mordovia, a selo in Shaversky Selsoviet of Krasnoslobodsky District in the Republic of Mordovia; 54°21′N 43°46′E

== Alternative names ==
- Tenishevo, alternative name of Tatarskoye Tenishevo, a village in Bolsheshustruysky Selsoviet of Atyuryevsky District in the Republic of Mordovia; 54°14′N 43°27′E
