= Syukeyevo =

Village in Kamsko-Ustyinsky District, Republic of Tatarstan, Russia

Coordinates: 55°06′N 49°01′E

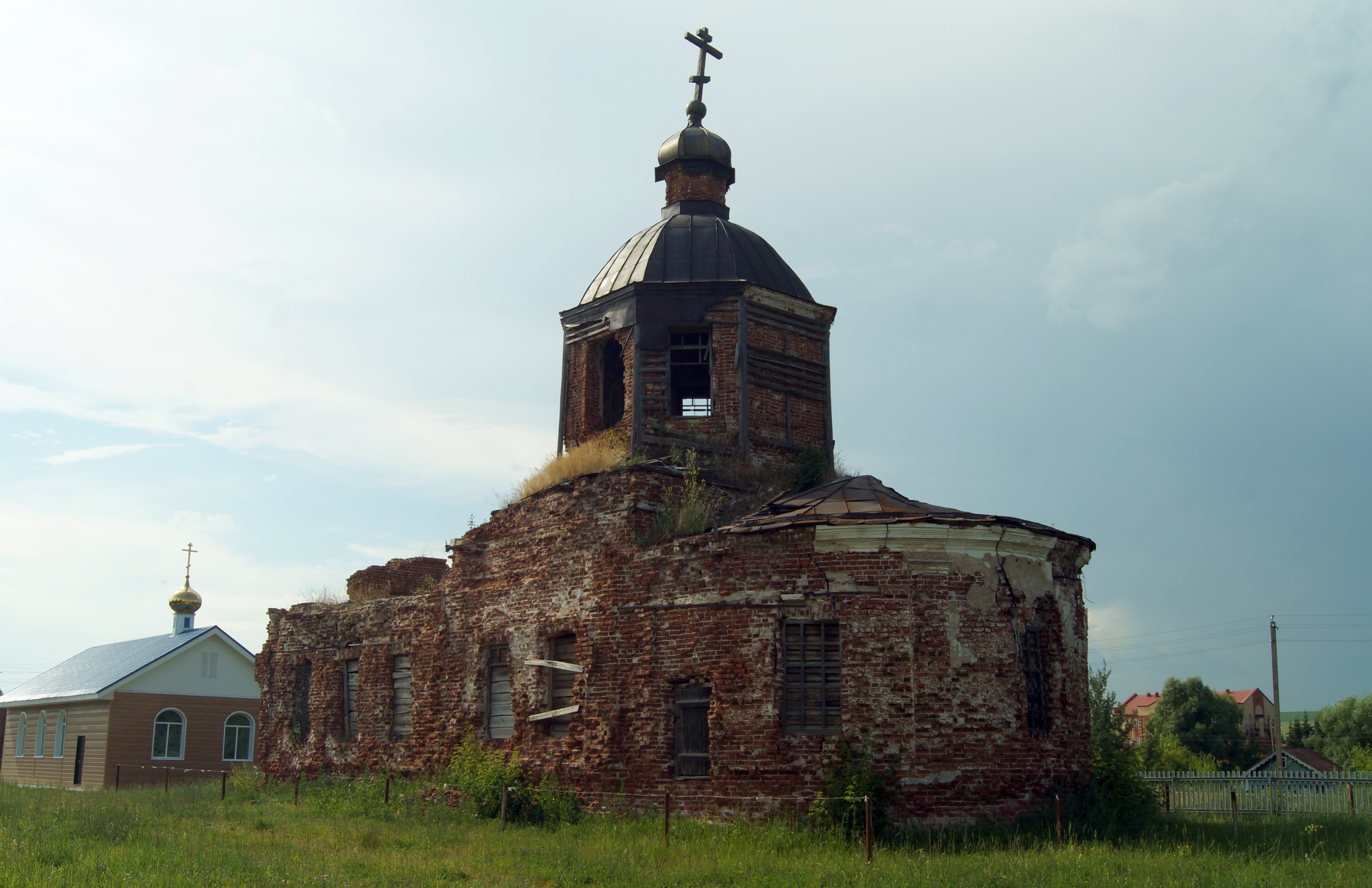
Trinity Church: Syukeevo, Kamsko-Ustinsky District, Tatarstan

Syukeyevo (Russian: Сюке́ево; Tatar: Сөйки) is a rural locality (a selo) in Kamsko-Ustyinsky District of the Republic of Tatarstan, Russia, located on the bank of the Mordovskaya River (a right tributary of the Volga), 23 kilometers (14 mi) southwest of Kamskoye Ustye, the administrative center of the district. Population: 750 (1997 est.); 792 (1989); all ethnic Russians.

== History ==
Syukeyevo has been known to exist since the times of the Khanate of Kazan.

In the 19th century, Syukeyevo produced bricks, and the main occupations of the people were carpentry and limestone, sulfur, and bitumen mining. The now destroyed Syukeyevo Caves were located nearby.

On July 11, 2011, cruise ship Bulgaria shipwrecked near Syukeyevo.

== Economy and infrastructure ==
There is a secondary school and a church in Syukeyevo. The main occupation of the population is agriculture and cattle breeding. A gypsum mine is constructed in nearby Syukeyevsky Vzvoz.
