= Syukeyevo Caves =

Former caves in Tatarstan, Russia

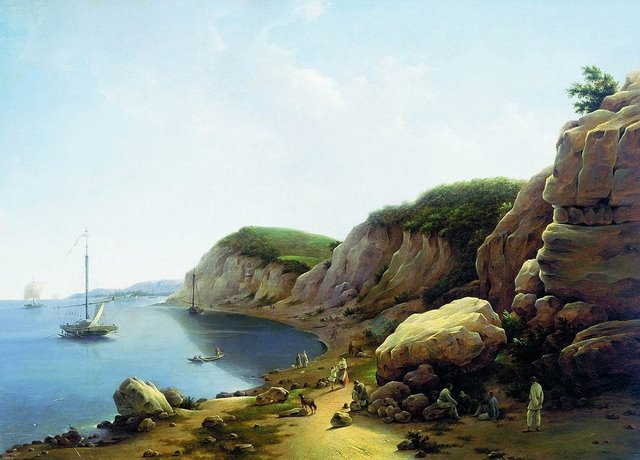
- Interactive map of Syukeyevo Caves
- Location: Kamsko-Ustyinski District, Russia
- Coordinates: 55°04′46″N 49°03′09″E

Syukeyevo Caves (Russian: Сюкеевские пещеры, Tatar: Сөйке мәгарәләре) were a group of caves in what is today Kamsko-Ustyinski District, Tatarstan, Russia. Located near the village of Syukeyevo until 1958, they were destroyed by an eruption of the banks of the newly filled Kuybyshev Reservoir.

There were several minor and three notable caves, the biggest Maiden Cave was 120 m long and 14515 m³ in volume. The second notable, Minor Syukeyevo Cave was 70 m long and 734 m³ in volume. Both caves had a dolomite top and a gypsum bottom.
