= Volgoneft-248 =

Russian oil tanker, 1975 to 1991

History
- Name: Volgoneft-248
- Owner: Volgotanker
- Port of registry: 1975 (Soviet Union) Astrakhan; 1991 (Russia) Astrakhan
- Builder: Volgograd shipyard, Volgograd
- Yard number: 945
- Identification: IMO number: 8728000; call sign UFVP
- Fate: broke in two, 29 December 1999

General characteristics
- Class & type: Project 1577 oil tanker
- Tonnage: 3,566 GRT, 1,760 NRT
- Displacement: 6,513 t (6,410 long tons)
- Length: 132.6 m (435 ft 0 in)
- Beam: 16.9 m (55 ft 5 in)
- Draught: 3.62 m (11 ft 11 in)
- Depth: 5.5 m (18 ft 1 in)
- Decks: 1
- Installed power: 2 × diesel engines; 2 × 736 kW (987 hp)
- Propulsion: 2 × screws
- Speed: 11 knots (20 km/h)
- Crew: 22 or 23

MV Volgoneft-248 (Волгонефть-248) was a Project 1577 Volgoneft oil tanker that was owned and operated by Volgotanker. She was built in the Soviet Union in 1975. A storm in the Sea of Marmara in 1999 broke her in two. Her forward section sank, and her aft section ran aground. Her bow was later raised and scrapped. Much of her cargo of oil was spilt, causing a major pollution incident. That pollution, its effect, and the clean-up work, have become the subject of a number of academic studies in Turkey.

== Description ==
Project 1577 is a Soviet design of tanker that was intended for "mixed navigation": operating on the canals and large navigable rivers of European Russia; and also short-sea shipping in favourable sea conditions, with waves no more than 2 metres (6 ft 7 in) high. The Volgograd shipyard ("Волгоградский судостроительный завод") in Volgograd built many of them. Volgoneft-248 was built as yard number 945, and completed in 1975. Her length was 132.6 m (435 ft 0 in); her beam 16.9 m (55 ft 5 in); and her depth 5.5 m (18 ft 1 in). Her tonnages were 3,566 GRT and 1,760 NRT. When laden with a full cargo of 4,875 tonnes (4,798 long tons; 5,374 short tons) of kerosene, her draught was 3.62 m (11 ft 11 in), and she displaced 6,513 tonnes (6,410 long tons). She had two fixed-pitch screws, each driven by a 8NVD48A diesel engine rated at 736 kilowatts (987 hp). Her twin engines gave her a speed of 11 knots (20 km/h). She also had twin rudders. She had berths for 22 or 23 crew.

Volgoneft-248 was registered in Astrakhan, on the Volga river. Her IMO number was 8728000, and her call sign was UFVP.

== Loss ==
In December 1999, Volgoneft-248 left Burgas in Bulgaria carrying 4,365 tonnes (4,296 long tons; 4,812 short tons) of heavy fuel oil. On 27 December she passed through the Bosphorus, and anchored off Ambarlı oil terminal to await a berth to discharge her cargo. On 29 December, a southerly gale broke her anchor chain, and broke the ship in two about 0.5 nautical miles (1 km) off the coast. Her forward section sank in about 30 metres (98 ft) of water, and the gale drove her aft section ashore at Küçükçekmece, in the Menekşe district of Istanbul. Where the ship split in two, her numbers 5 and 6 cargo tanks were ruptured. This spilt about 1,279 tonnes (1,259 long tons; 1,410 short tons) of her oil cargo into the sea, causing a major pollution incident. The lighter fraction of the oil came ashore, where it polluted 5 kilometres (3 miles) of coast. The layer of oil was 50 millimetres (2 inches) thick, and from 2 to 10 metres (6 ft 7 in to 32 ft 10 in) wide. Work to remove it took more than four months. The heavier fraction of the oil sank and settled on the seabed, where it remains a contaminant and an environmental threat.

In the aft section, aground at Küçükçekmece, her numbers 7 and 8 cargo tanks contained about 1,013 tonnes (997 long tons; 1,117 short tons) of oil. These leaked oil into the sea until divers sealed the holes at the forward end. In the sunken forward section were cargo tanks 1 to 4, containing 2,073 tonnes (2,040 long tons; 2,285 short tons) of oil. Most of the oil in the forward section was recovered in February 2000, but the remainder continued to leak into the sea until that summer. The total spillage was about 4,365 tonnes of oil. Eventually, a floating crane raised the sunken forward section, and took it to Aliağa.

== See also ==
- MT Independența, a Romanian tanker that exploded and grounded at the Sea of Marmara end of the Bosphorus in 1979.
- MV Volgoneft-139, a Volgotanker ship that broke in two in the Kerch Strait in 2007.

== Sources and further reading ==
- Alpar, Bedri; Ünlü, Selma (March 2007). "Petroleum Residue following Volgoneft-248 Oil Spill at the Coasts of the Suburb of Florya, Marmara Sea (Turkey): A Critique".
- Okuş, Erdoğan; Güven, Kasım C; Uysal, Ayhan; Ünlü, Selma; Gezgin, Tuncay; Nesimigil, Filiz; Cumalı, Selin; Yalçın, Ahmet (2007). "Petroleum pollution by Volgoneft-248 tanker accident occurred [sic] on 29.12.1999 in Istanbul, Florya-Küçükçekmece area" (PDF). Journal of the Black Sea / Mediterranean Environment. 13 (2): 119–138.
- Otay, Emre N; Yenigün, Orhan (January 2001). "The Volgoneft-248 Oil Spill in the Marmara Sea".
- Talinli, İlhan; Tosun, Ceren; Aydin, Egemen (January 2005). "Toxicity evaluation in marmara shoreline: Impact of oil spill from volgoneft-248".
- Tas, Seyfettin; Okuş, Erdoğan; Ünlü, Selma; Altiok, Hüsne (May 2011). "A study on phytoplankton following 'Volgoneft-248' oil spill on the north-eastern coast of the Sea of Marmara". Journal of the Marine Biological Association of the United Kingdom. 91 (3). Cambridge: Cambridge University Press: 715–725. Bibcode:2011JMBUK..91..715T. doi:10.1017/S0025315410000330. ISSN 0025-3154 – via ResearchGate.
- Tas, Seyfettin (2018). "Estimated effects of oil spill on phytoplankton following 'Volgoneft-248' accident (Sea of Marmara)". In Ünlü, Selma; Alpar, Bedri; Öztürk, Bayram (eds.). Oil Spill Along the Turkish Straits Sea Area; Accidents, Environmental Pollution, Socio-Economic Impacts and Protection. Istanbul: Turkish Marine Research Foundation. pp. 229–237. ISBN 978-975-8825-39-4.
