= Asia South Korea =

1972–1999 Philippines passenger ferry

History

Japan
- Name: Kishu
- Owner: Kishu Ferry
- Operator: Kishu Ferry
- Route: Kobe-Hainan-Shirahama
- Builder: Tadotsu Shipyard (Kure, Hiroshima)
- Launched: 1972
- In service: 1972
- Out of service: 1975
- Home port: Kobe
- Fate: Sold to Nihon Car Ferry

History

Japan
- Name: Salvia
- Owner: Nihon Car Ferry
- Operator: Nihon Car Ferry
- Route: Hiroshima-Hoshoshima
- In service: 1976
- Out of service: 1982
- Home port: Hiroshima
- Fate: Sold to Hanil Express

History

South Korea
- Name: Hanil Car Ferry No. 1 (first)
- Owner: Hanil Express
- Operator: Hanil Express
- In service: 1982
- Out of service: 1999
- Fate: Sold to TASLI

History

Philippines
- Name: Asia South Korea
- Operator: Trans-Asia Shipping Lines
- Launched: 1999
- Identification: IMO number: 7213046
- Fate: Sank, 23 December 1999

General characteristics
- Type: Passenger ferry
- Tonnage: 2,840 GT
- Capacity: 614 passengers
- Crew: 58

Asia South Korea was a Philippines passenger ferry owned by Trans-Asia Shipping Lines that sank off Bantayan Island in Cebu province on 23 December 1999. It was discovered that the number of passengers aboard exceeded the total capacity of the 27-year-old ferry.

== Sinking ==
The 2,840 ton Asia South Korea sailed from Mandaue on Cebu Island late on 22 December bound for Iloilo City on the island of Panay. She had been initially barred from sailing after a Coast Guard inspection found that the ship was overloaded. Permission was finally given to sail after excess passengers were debarked.

At 05:00 on 22 December the ship was off Bantayan Island in stormy weather. According to one crew member a large wave swamped the ferry, knocking out the power. Life vests were then distributed and rafts were launched immediately. Other reports state that the ship was off course and struck a reef before sinking.

The cargo ship Jon Dexter reported that they saw the ferry listing on its port side with no lights showing minutes before it sank. The Jon Dexter and the ferry MV St. Peter the Apostle rescued many survivors before Philippine naval ships and military helicopters arrived.

=== Numbers aboard and fatalities ===
In the immediate aftermath of the tragedy a spokesman for the operators, Trans-Asia Shipping Lines, claimed that there were only 606 passengers and 52 crew aboard the 27-year-old ferry, which was authorized to carry 614 passengers and a crew of 58, denying that it was overloaded, citing the Coast Guard head-count before sailing.

The local military authorities coordinating search and rescue efforts estimated the number aboard as 755. The number of those killed is also disputed; the Philippine Daily Inquirer claimed 42 fatalities, while the Office of Civil Defense, claimed 45. According to a 2008 International Maritime Organization Maritime Safety Report there were 56 fatalities.

In early 2000 charges were laid against the master and chief mate of the Asia South Korea of failing to safely navigate their ship, manslaughter, and causing physical injury.

== See also ==
- List of maritime disasters in the Philippines
- List of shipwrecks in 1999
