= Tenishevo, Republic of Tatarstan =

Tenishevo Тенишево
- Urban-type settlement

Other transcription(s)
  - Tatar: Тенеш
- Interactive map of Tenishevo
- Location of Tenishevo Tenishevo (Tatarstan)
- Coordinates: 55°15′N 49°10′E
- Country: Russia
- Federal subject: Tatarstan
- Administrative district: Kamsko-Ustyinsky District
- Founded: 1930s
- Urban-type settlement status since: 1997

Population (2010 Census)
  - Total: 809
  - Estimate (2021): 708 (−12.5%)

Municipal status
  - Municipal district: Kamsko-Ustyinsky Municipal District
  - Urban settlement: Tenishevo Urban Settlement
  - Capital of: Tenishevo Urban Settlement
- Time zone: UTC+3 (MSK)
- Postal code: 422839
- OKTMO ID: 92630165051

Tenishevo population
- 2010 Census: 809
- 2002 Census: 866

Tenishevo (Russian: Тенишево; Tatar: Тенеш) is an urban locality (an urban-type settlement) in Kamsko-Ustyinsky District of the Republic of Tatarstan, Russia. As of the 2010 Census, its population was 809.

== History ==
It was established in the 1930s and was granted urban-type settlement status in 1997. Until October 17, 2002, it was known as imeni 9 yanvarya (имени 9 января).

== Administrative and municipal status ==
Within the framework of administrative divisions, the urban-type settlement of Tenishevo is subordinated to Kamsko-Ustyinsky District. As a municipal division, Tenishevo is incorporated within Kamsko-Ustyinsky Municipal District as Tenishevo Urban Settlement.
