= Volgotanker =

Russian tank storage company

"Volgotanker" Volga Oil Tanker Shipping Company
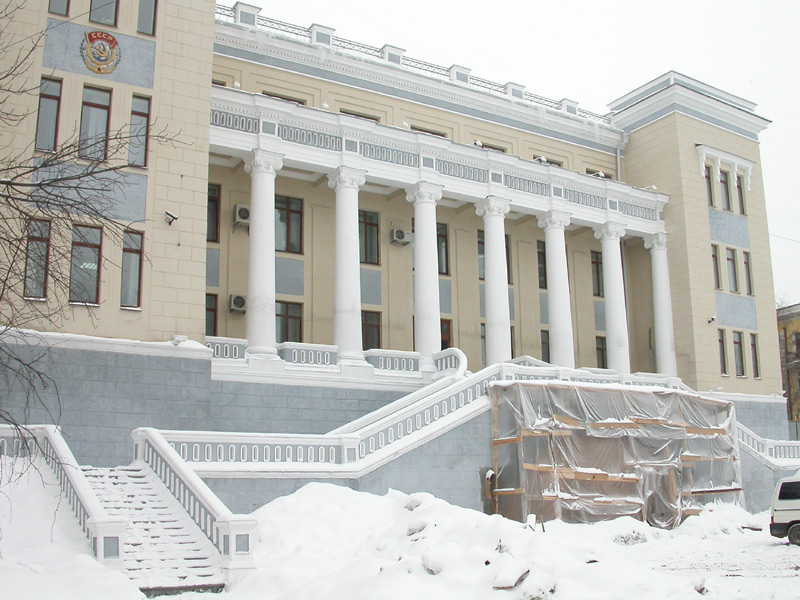
- Company type: Open Joint Stock Company
- Industry: Tank storage, transportation
- Predecessor: Volga State Shipping Company
- Founded: 1938; 88 years ago
- Headquarters: Samara, Russia
- Key people: Vitaliy Shemigon (insolvency representative)
- Revenue: (209.5 million rubles (Fiscal year ending December 31, 2016))
- Net income: (97.6 million rubles (Fiscal year ending December 31, 2016))

Volgotanker (Russian: ОАО «Волжское нефтеналивное пароходство „Волгота́нкер“», '"Volgotanker" Volga Oil Tanker Shipping JSC') is a Russian company engaged in the business of tank storage and transporting oil and oil products by tanker along the inland waterways and coastal seas of European Russia. It is headquartered in Samara.

The company was re-incorporated in October 2020.

== History ==
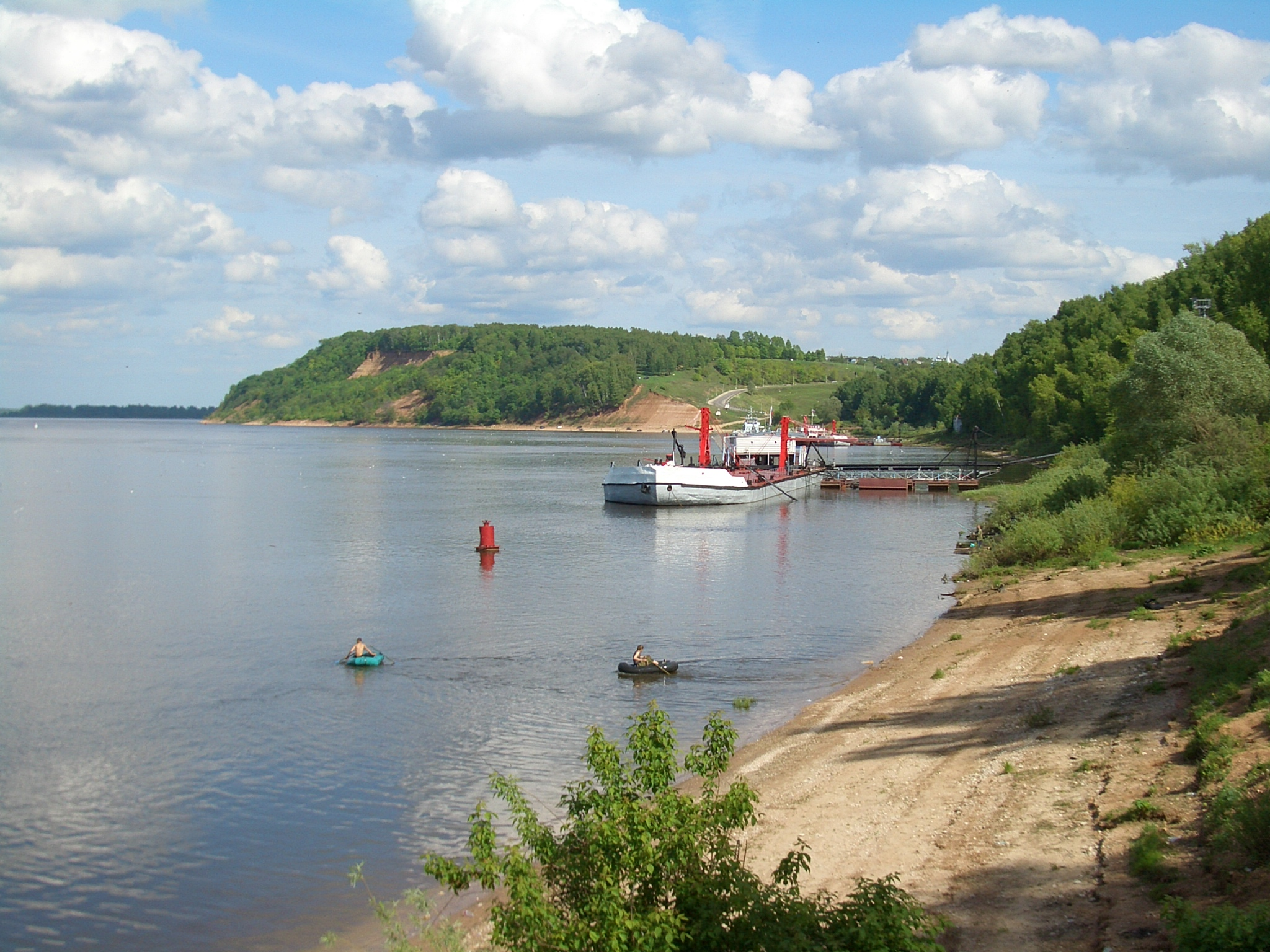
An oil terminal in Kstovo on the Middle Volga, one of many served by Volgotanker

=== Soviet period ===
The history of Volgotanker goes back to the Oil Fleet Agency, part of the Volga State Shipping Company, which was established in 1923. In 1938, the agency was spun off into a separate state-owned company, called Volgatanker. Its mandate was to ship crude oil and oil products, primarily coming from the Baku oil fields, from the Caspian port of Astrakhan to Russia's industrial centers along the Volga and Kama. The service turned out to be highly important during the Second World War, when most of the railway lines connecting the Caucasus with Central Russia were cut by enemy action in 1942. Fifty-nine of the company's barges were sunk or damaged during the war, primarily by Luftwaffe's bombs and mines, with the loss of 123 sailors.

Soon after the war, the company also started transporting oil from Russia's so-called "Second Baku" – oil fields in Bashkiria and eastern Tatarstan. As oil refineries were built along the Volga and its tributaries (e.g. at Ufa, Kstovo, and Syzran), their products were also taken to markets throughout Russia by Volgotanker. The Volga–Baltic Waterway and Volga–Don Canal made it possible to deliver oil and oil products to Soviet ports on the Baltic, Azov and Black Seas as well. As of 1965, the company transported 3 million metric tons of oil and oil products per year. That year, Volgotanker also started transporting oil directly to Finnish ports.

When in August 1970, Volgotanker's Nefterudovoz-3 arrived to Kandalaksha, it was the first tanker ever to bring a cargo of oil directly from the Volga basin over the White Sea–Baltic Canal and into the White Sea.

By 1984, shipping volumes reached 35 million tons per year.

=== Post-Soviet ===
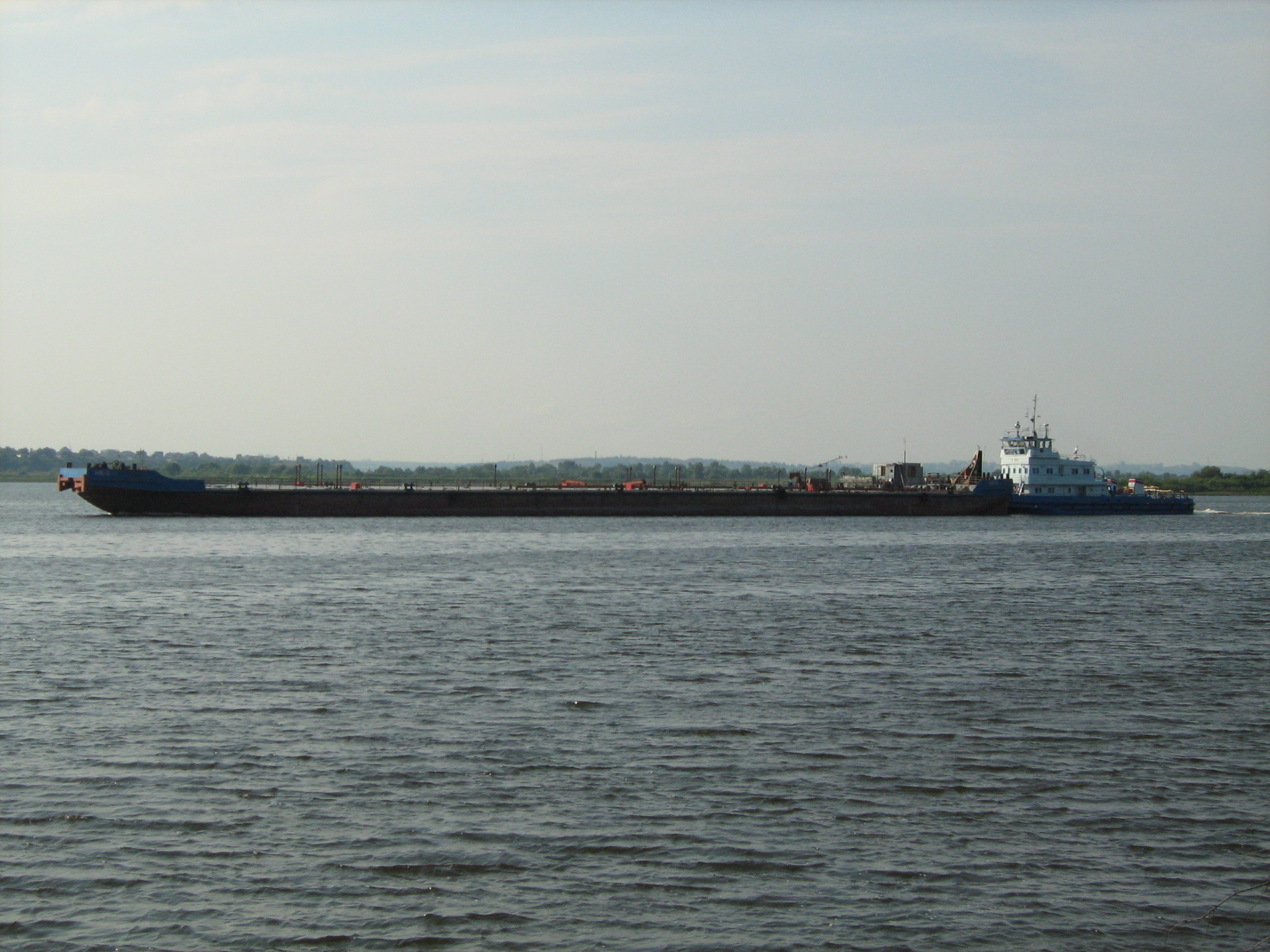
A Volgotanker barge

Since the late 1980s, the operations entered a decline along with much of the Soviet economy. In 1992, the company was privatized as a Joint-Stock Company (a corporation). With the decline of domestic operations, transportation of oil for export became the main line of business for the company, reaching 70% of its operations by 1993. It was not until the early 21st century that the volume of operations started to rise again.

Besides its traditional Baltic and Black Sea export directions, in the 2003 Volgotanker resumed using the White Sea–Baltic Canal. The plan was to transport 800,000 tons of fuel oil this way, for transfer to Latvian seagoing tankers at a floating transfer station near the Osinki Island in the Onega Bay, 36 km north-east of the port of Onega. The next year plans were for 1,500,000 tons. Local fishery authorities reported that some 74 km of the coast were contaminated by oil, at least 300 seabirds and a number of seals died. As a result, fines were paid by Volgotanker to the city of Onega, the transfer operations closed down by the Arkhangelsk Oblast authorities after only 220,000 tons have been exported, and the company did not get a permit for similar operations in the following year.

Yukos was Volgotanker's largest customer as well as a major shareholder. As Yukos started having problems with the government in the mid-2000s, it was replaced with Rosneft as the main customer.

In 2004, Volgotanker itself has been charged with tax evasion and levied a fine of $23 million. After a few rocky years, the company was eventually placed into bankruptcy in 2007, and sales of assets were impending as of the summer 2007.

== Fleet ==
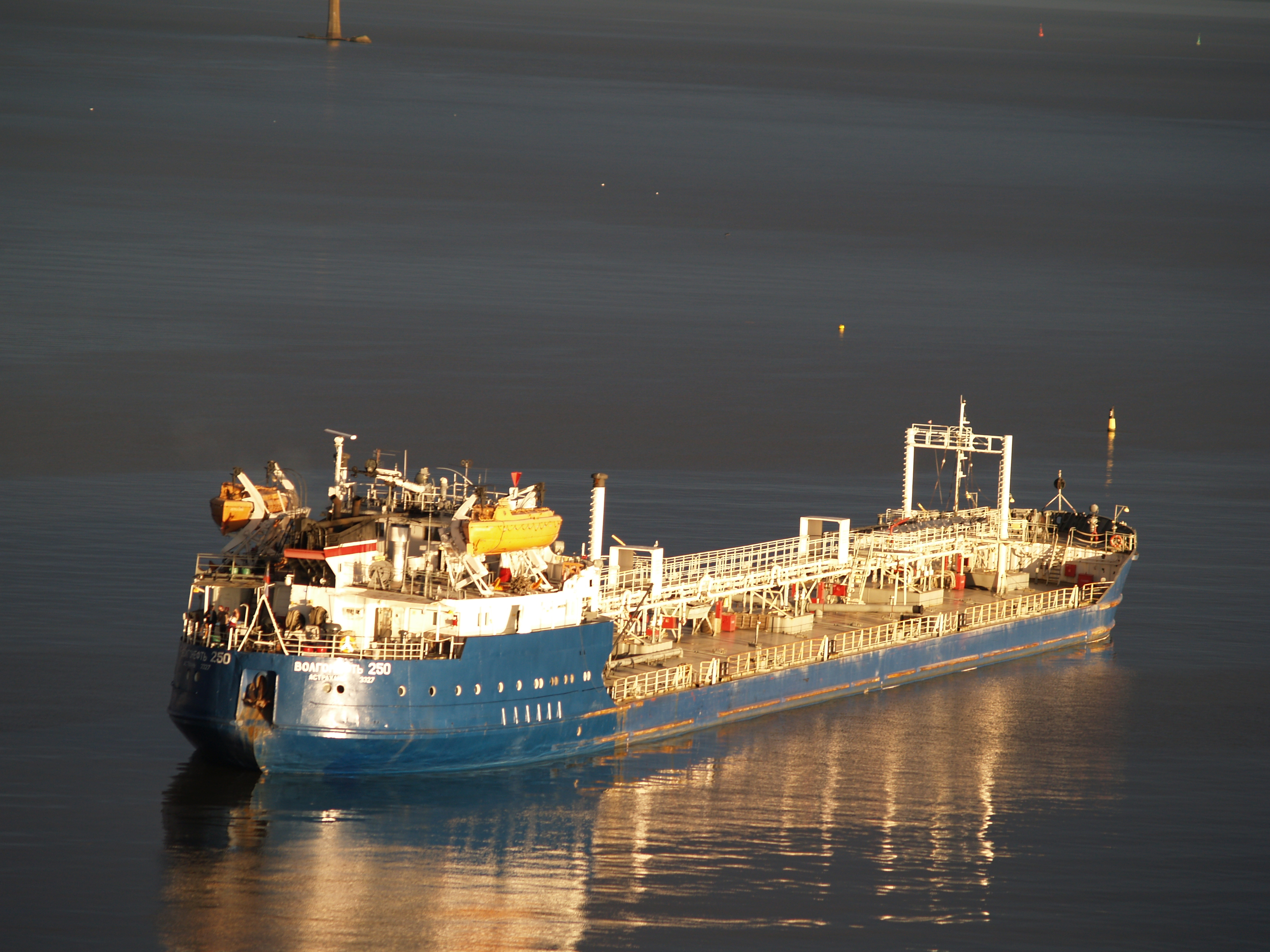
Tanker Volgoneft-250

As of the mid-2000s, the company controlled 70% of liquid cargo transportation market in the basin of Volga and Kama, and carried about 10% of the total Russian exports of fuel oil. It owned 353 vessels with the total carrying capacity of over 1.2 million tons, as follows:

- 204 tankers and ore-bulk-oil carriers with capacities ranging from 300 to 10,000 tons;
- 95 barges with a capacity ranging from 1,000 to 9,000 tons;
- 54 tugboats.

Most vessels have a name consisting of the word Volgoneft and a number, e.g. Volgoneft-139.

The fleet runs "ghost" ships to circumvent the sanctions put on the Russian oil trade after the 2022 invasion of Ukraine. The fleet is poorly maintained, and its ships have a history of splitting in two in rough seas. On December 29, 1999, Volgoneft-248 broke in two in the Sea of Marmara. The bow section sank; and at least 4,300 tons of her cargo of fuel oil spilled into the sea. On November 11, 2007, Volgoneft-139 broke in two in the Kerch Strait. The bow section sank; and at least 1,300 tons of her cargo of fuel oil spilled into the sea. On December 15, 2024, also in the Kerch Strait, Volgoneft-212 broke in two, and her bow section sank, causing a major oil spill. At the same time, Volgoneft-239 was damaged in the Kerch Strait, and ran aground.

== Owners and management ==
In 2018, 73.85% of the shares of Volgotanker were controlled by CJSC Trinfico, 20% of the shares belonged to the Rosimushchestvo.

== Literature ==
- Волжско-Каспийский бассейн в 1942—1943 годах: обеспечение коренного перелома в войне. [Volga-Caspian Basin in 1942–1943: Ensuring the turning point in the war.] (in Russian). Volgograd: Litres. 2019. ISBN 9785042445392.
- Kurdin, V.A.; Saratov, V.F.; Chebotarev, M.N. (1987). Речной транспорт в 1946-1985 годах [River transport in 1946–1985] (in Russian). Moscow: Transport.
- Lyutskov, E. (2015). Ветеран труда. Наградная фалеристика предприятий и организаций СССР [Veteran of Labor. Faleristics of enterprises and organizations in the USSR] (in Russian). Moscow: Лютцков Е.Ю.
