= Icing (nautical) =

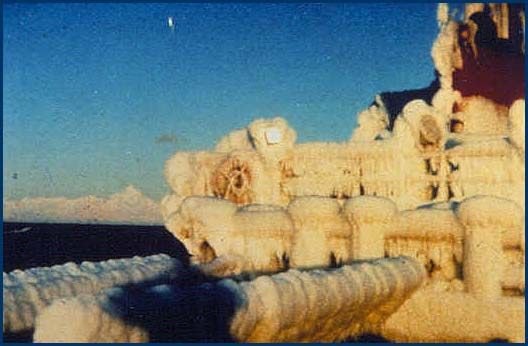
Ice coating a United States Navy vessel

Icing on ships is a serious hazard where cold temperatures (below about −10 °C or 14 °F) combined with high wind speed (typically force 8 or above on the Beaufort scale) result in spray blown off the sea freezing immediately on contact with the ship. If not frequently knocked off, the ice can soon build up on the ship's superstructure to a sufficient weight to capsize the ship.

It is typically a problem in Arctic and Antarctic seas, but can also occur in other seas such as the Gulf of Saint Lawrence, the Sea of Japan, the Baltic Sea, and, very rarely, the North Sea.

== See also ==
- Shipping Forecast
