= Kamskoye Ustye =

Kamskoye Ustye Камское Устье
- Urban-type settlement

Other transcription(s)
  - Tatar: Кама Тамагы
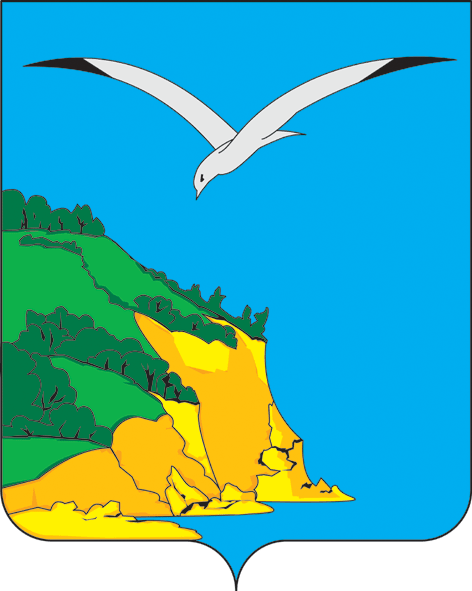
- Coat of arms
- Interactive map of Kamskoye Ustye
- Location of Kamskoye Ustye Kamskoye Ustye (Tatarstan)
- Coordinates: 55°12′N 49°16′E
- Country: Russia
- Federal subject: Tatarstan
- Administrative district: Kamsko-Ustyinsky District
- Founded: 17th century
- Urban-type settlement status since: 1939
- Elevation: 134 m (440 ft)

Population (2010 Census)
  - Total: 4,482
  - Estimate (2021): 4,391 (−2%)

Administrative status
  - Capital of: Kamsko-Ustyinsky District

Municipal status
  - Municipal district: Kamsko-Ustyinsky Municipal District
  - Urban settlement: Kamskoye Ustye Urban Settlement
  - Capital of: Kamsko-Ustyinsky Municipal District, Kamskoye Ustye Urban Settlement
- Time zone: UTC+3 (MSK)
- Postal codes: 422819, 422820
- OKTMO ID: 92630151051

Kamskoye Ustye (Russian: Ка́мское У́стье; Tatar: Кама Тамагы) is an urban locality (an urban-type settlement) and the administrative center of Kamsko-Ustyinsky District in the Republic of Tatarstan, Russia, located on the Kuybyshev Reservoir, near the confluence of the Volga and Kama Rivers, 117 kilometers (73 mi) from the republic's capital of Kazan. As of the 2010 Census, its population was 4,482.

== History ==
It was established in the 17th century and was known as the selo of Bogorodskoye (Богородское) until 1925. Urban-type settlement status was granted to it in 1939. Kamskoye Ustye served as the district administrative center in 1930–1963, and again since 1965.

== Administrative and municipal status ==
Within the framework of administrative divisions, the urban-type settlement of Kamskoye Ustye serves as the administrative center of Kamsko-Ustyinsky District, of which it is a part. As a municipal division, Kamskoye Ustye is incorporated within Kamsko-Ustyinsky Municipal District as Kamskoye Ustye Urban Settlement.

== Economy ==
Alabaster, lime, and sulfur have been mined here since the 19th century. Industrial facilities include a dairy factory and several construction and agricultural enterprises. The nearest railway station is Karatun on the Ulyanovsk–Sviyazhsk line, 57 kilometers (35 mi) east of Kamskoye Ustye.

== Demographics ==
Kamskoye Ustye population
- 2010 Census: 4,482
- 2002 Census: 4,451
- 1989 Census: 4,367
- 1979 Census: 4,122

In 1989, the majority of the population was ethnically Russian (52.4%) and Tatar (44.0%).
