= Rachel Harvey =

History
- Port of registry: (United Kingdom) Jersey
- Fate: Wrecked 1999

General characteristics
- Type: Fishing vessel
- Crew: 6

Rachel Harvey was a Jersey-registered fishing vessel which, at 9:45 p.m. on 1 October 1999, struck rocks 200 yards (180 m) off Peninnis Head in the Isles of Scilly in stormy seas. St Mary's Lifeboat and a search-and-rescue Sea King helicopter from RNAS Culdrose attended the scene. The lifeboat picked up all six crew, but one man was pronounced dead on arrival at St Mary's Hospital.

== See also ==
- List of shipwrecks of the Isles of Scilly
