= Kamsko-Ustyinsky District =

Kamsko-Ustyinsky District Камско-Устьинский район (Russian)
- District

Other transcription(s)
  - Tatar: Кама Тамагы районы
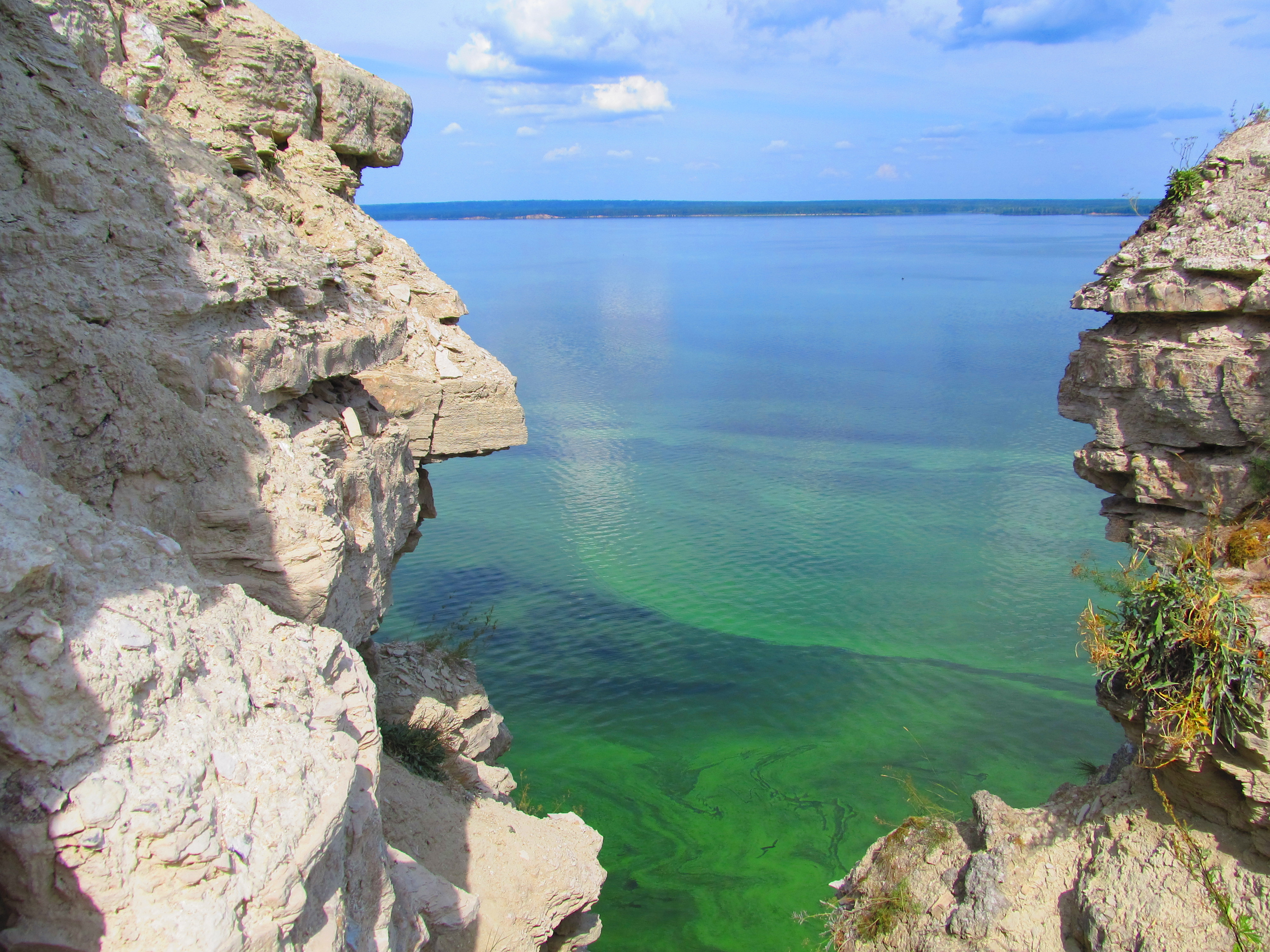
- A cave system, a protected area of Russia, in Kamsko-Ustyinsky District

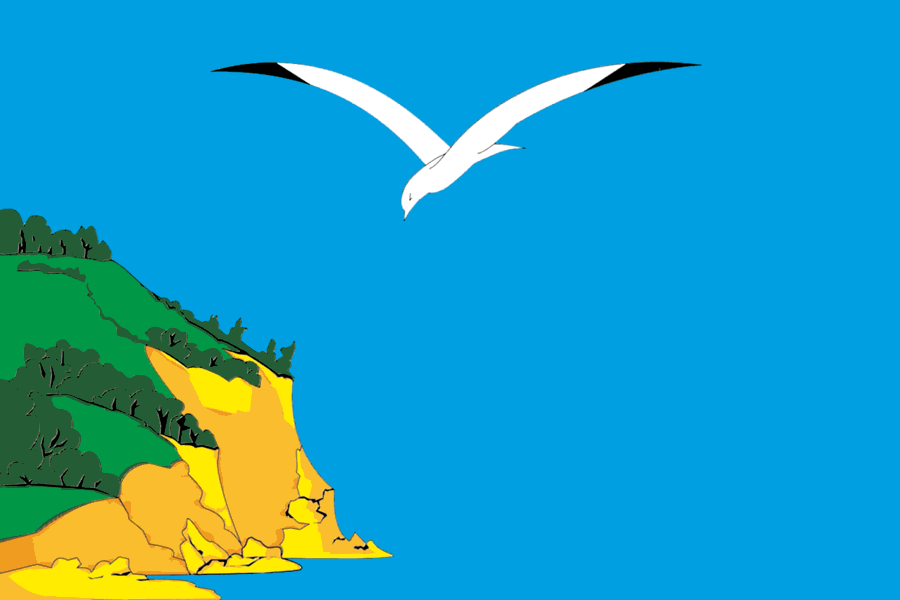
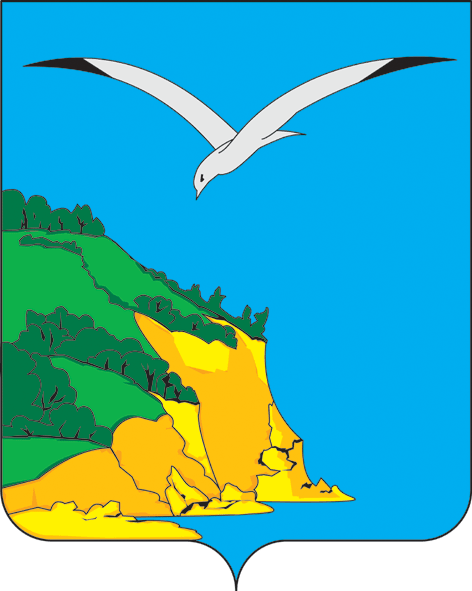
- Flag Coat of arms
- Location of Kamsko-Ustyinsky District in the Republic of Tatarstan
- Coordinates: 55°16′N 49°02′E
- Country: Russia
- Federal subject: Republic of Tatarstan
- Established: 12 January 1965
- Administrative center: Kamskoye Ustye

Area
  - Total: 1,199 km^{2} (463 sq mi)

Population (2010 Census)
  - Total: 16,904
  - Density: 14.10/km^{2} (36.51/sq mi)
  - Urban: 47.1%
  - Rural: 52.86%

Administrative structure
  - Inhabited localities: 3 urban-type settlements, 49 rural localities

Municipal structure
  - Municipally incorporated as: Kamsko-Ustyinsky Municipal District
  - Municipal divisions: 3 urban settlements, 17 rural settlements
- Time zone: UTC+3 (MSK)
- OKTMO ID: 92630000
- Website: http://kamskoye-ustye.tatarstan.ru

Kamsko-Ustyinsky District (Russian: Камско-Устьинский райо́н; Tatar: Кама Тамагы районы) is a territorial administrative unit and municipality of the Republic of Tatarstan within the Russian Federation. The district is located in the west of the republic, on the right bank of the Volga River. The territory of the district includes 49 settlements which are organized into three urban and seventeen rural settlements. The district population was 14,747 in 2020. The administrative center of the district is the urban-type settlement Kamskoye Ustye.

== Geography ==
The total area of the district is 1198.8 km^{2}. The district shares borders with Tetyushsky, Apastovsky, Verkhneuslonsky, Laishevsky and Spassky districts of the Republic of Tatarstan. The topography of the district is distinguished by an elevated plain with an average height of 170–190 meters. Forested areas cover 7.9% of the district. The distinctive hills along the banks of the Volga are called “mountains”: the Yuriev mountains, the Bogorodsky mountains, the Sukeevy mountains, and the Tetyushsky mountains. Notable landmarks in the district also include Lobach Mountain and the Yurievskaya Cave. There are reserves of dolomite, clay and gypsum (including the largest in the republic, the Kamsko-Ustinskoye deposit) on the territory of the district. Some of these deposits have exhausted their resources (Gipsy-1). The eastern and southern borders of the region are formed by the Kuybyshev Reservoir, which is 16 km wide. Before the formation of the reservoir, the confluence of the Volga and Kama rivers lay within the boundaries of the district. The largest river drainage areas (with a total length of at least 15 km) in the district include:

- Sviyaga basin - the Suhaya Ulema river and its tributaries Kiyarmet, Bolshoi Shakyan;
- the Volga basin - the Karamalka, the Mordovskaya, the Ishimovskaya rivers.

== Coat of arms and flag ==
The district flag and coat of arms were approved on June 21, 2006, by the decision of the Kamsko-Ustyinsky District Council. They were created by the Heraldic Council with the President of the Republic of Tatarstan. The territory of the Kamsko-Ustyinsky district is located at the confluence of the Volga and Kama rivers. It is represented by the abundance of blue, which reflects beauty and the river. The silver color and the mountainous river bank indicate the natural and geographical features of the district. The flag is based on heraldic elements of the district coat of arms.

== History ==
The regional center of the district was founded as a fishing village in the 17th century on the right bank of the Volga river. The village was transformed into an urban-type settlement and renamed as Kamskoye Ustye in 1939.

The district itself was established on August 10, 1930. Originally was part of the Tetyushsky district until 1920, and then part of Buinsky canton from 1927 to 1930. The Kamsko-Ustyinsky district was abolished and its land was transferred to Tetyushsky district on January 4, 1963. It was reestablished on January 12, 1965.

Starting on October 31, 2005, Zufar Galimullovich Garafiev occupied the position of the head of the Kamsko-Ustyinsky municipal district. In September 2015 Garafiev was succeeded by Pavel Nikolaevich Lokhanov who occupied this position until the end of 2018. Since January 2019, the head of the Kamsko-Ustyinsky district was Vazykhov Nail Albertovich.

== Population ==
There are three prominent nationalities in the district with 54% of the district population identifying as Tatars, 43% as Russians, 1% as Chuvash and 2% as representatives of other nationalities. 50.38% of the district's population live in urban conditions (in the urban settlements of Kamskoye Ustye, Kuibyshevsky Zaton and Tenishevo).

== Municipal and administrative status ==
In the Kamsko-Ustyinsky municipal district, there are 3 urban and 17 rural settlements further partitioned into 52 settlements within them. The administrative centers of rural settlements in the district are the villages: Kamskoye Ustye, Kuybyshevskiy Zaton, Tenishevo, Baltachevo, Bolshiye Burtasy, Bolshiye Karmaly, Bolshiye Klyari, Bolshiye Saltyki, Azimovo-Kurlebash, Kirelskoye, Klyancheyevo, Krasnovidovo, Malyye Saltyki, Osinniki, Staroye Baryshevo, Karatalga, Syukeyevo, Tenki, Urazlino, and Bolshaya Yangasala.

== Economy ==
=== Industry ===
The largest regional industrial enterprises are the companies Kamsko-Ustyinsky gypsum mine (the main supplier of gypsum stone in the Republic of Tatarstan), Fonika Gips (mining, processing and production of construction materials, production of dry building mixtures, and others), Repair base of the fleet named after Kuibyshev (repair, maintenance and re-equipment of ships).

The district's gross product was measured at 667 million rubles during the period from January to September 2020, by comparison this amount for the whole of 2013 constituted almost 586 million rubles.

=== Agriculture ===
Agriculture is the backbone of the economy of the Kamsko-Ustyinsky district. Spring and winter wheat, winter rye, barley, peas are cultivated in the district. The main livestock industries in the district are dairy and beef cattle breeding and pig breeding. Four agricultural enterprises and 24 peasant farms operated in the district during 2016. The total area of arable land in the district amounted to 55 thousand hectares in 2016. 44.9 thousand hectares of this land was occupied by the Ak Bars division of the holding agricultural production Kamsko-Ustyinskoe and livestock farming Idel. The companies Krasny Vostok (Bolshie Klyari and agricultural production named after Lenin) work in the same areas of the district. Five agricultural firms and 35 farms operated in the Kamsko-Ustyinsky district in 2019. The agricultural companies Kamskaya, Burtasy, Bolshiye Klyari and Novoagrotek were registered in the district in 2020.

In 2017, ten farms combined to create a farm site and merged into the agricultural livestock consumer cooperative Maloe Meretkozino in the village of Maloe Meretkozino with 42 million rubles being invested in this project.

The gross territorial product of the agricultural sector amounted to 4.27 billion rubles in 2018. The value of goods shipped in the district amounted to 726 million rubles in 2018. Farms produced 1,141 tons of milk and 116 tons of meat in 2018 and the volume of gross output amounted to almost 58 million rubles, for crop production 25.2 million and for livestock 32.7 million.

Farms raised 3,000 cattle, more than 5,000 goats and sheep, and more than 200 horses in 2019. There are more than 3 thousand hectares of arable land in the district with one thousand suitable for grain and another two thousand for fodder crops. The average grain yield in the district was 30.7 c / ha in 2020.

In the first half of 2020, gross agricultural output amounted to 158 million rubles in comparison to a figure of 728 million for the entirety of 2013.

=== Investment potential ===
The ratio of the average monthly wage to the minimum consumer budget increased from 1.86 to 1.97 in the period from 2010 to 2020. The unemployment rate also increased from 0.87% to 1.87% from 2013 to 2020.

According to the Committee of the Republic of Tatarstan on Socio-Economic Monitoring, investment in the fixed assets of the Kamsko-Ustyinsky district amounted to 448.5 million rubles in the first half of 2020. This was 0.2% of the total investment in Tatarstan in that period. The main sectors for investment in 2020 were agriculture, hunting and fishing (22 million rubles) and mining (19 million). According to the report of the Federal State Statistics Service of the republic, almost 235 million rubles of investment was attracted to the Kamsko-Ustyinsky district in 2019 (with the exception of budgetary funds and income from small businesses). In 2018 this sum was 280 million rubles.

=== Transport ===
The regional center is located 117 km south-west of Kazan. The main highways in the district are the 16K-0674 Kamskoye Ustye - Tenki - Oktyabrsky (R-241) (to Kazan), 16K-0980 Kamskoye Ustye - Tetyushi, 16K-0352 Kamskoye Ustye - Shonguty (R-241 ). Oil and gas pipelines traverse the district. The water communications of the region facilitate their widespread use as transport corridors, making them part of the transport network of federal significance. There are berths on the Volga River in the village of Kamskoye Ustye, Kuibyshevsky Zaton, Tenishevo, and the village of Tenki.

The Russian government approved the construction of the Moscow-Nizhny Novgorod-Kazan highway, which will become part of the Europe-Western China international road in 2018. On the territory of the Republic of Tatarstan, the route will pass through the Kaybitsky, Apastovsky, Verkhneuslonsky, Kamsko-Ustyinsky, Laishevsky and Pestrechinsky districts. Construction is expected to be completed in 2024.

== Environment ==
There are several specially protected natural sites on the territory of the district: Karamalskoe (Baikul) lake, Lesnoe lake, Yurievskaya cave, Zimoviev cave, Bogorodsk cave, Konnodolskaya cave, and natural parks such as Mountain Lobach, Labyshkinsky mountains, and Antonovskie ravines.

== Social welfare and public life ==
There are two monuments of urban planning and architecture, two monuments of history of republican significance and 48 monuments of archeology of republican significance in the district.

Education in the district is provided by 10 secondary, seven basic, eight primary schools and seven kindergarten schools, 14 preschool and three additional education institutions. Cultural life and recreation is facilitated by three central recreation centers and 21 rural houses of culture, 11 rural clubs, 27 libraries, two music schools. There are two museums in the district: the Kamsko-Ustinsky regional museum of local history and the Museum of Aleksei Maksimovich Gorky in the village of Krasnovidovo. There are also 19 mosques and 6 Orthodox churches on the territory of the district.

The regional newspaper Volzhskie Zori (Idel Tanary) has been published in the Russian and Tatar languages since 1932. Earlier the newspaper published under the title Vperyod (Alga), from 1938 to 2000 - Red Banner (Kyzyl Bayrak).

== See also ==
- Syukeyevo Caves
- Qaratay
