= Port of Astrakhan =

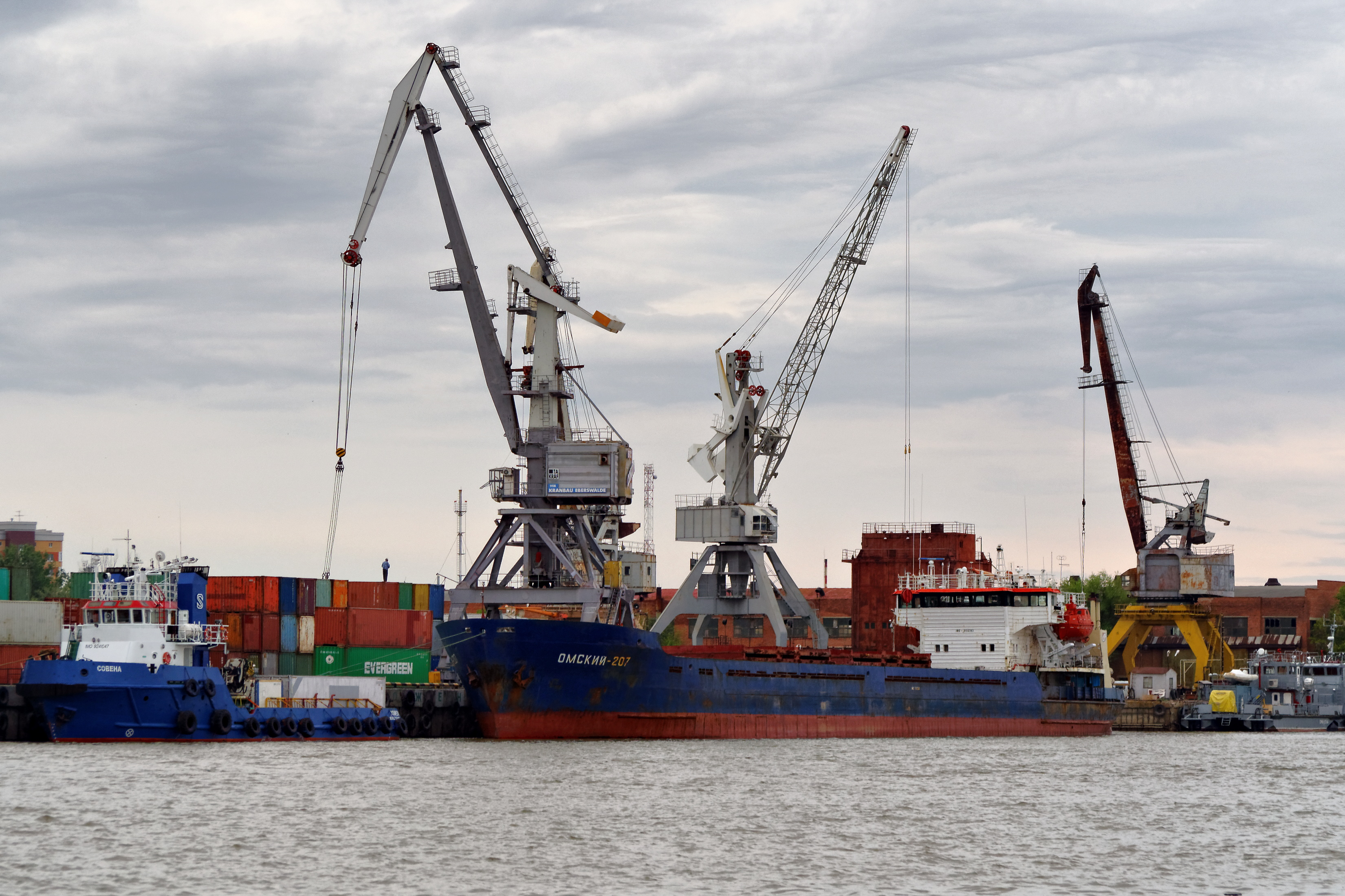
- View of the port
- Click on the map for a fullscreen view
- Native name: Астрахань (порт)

Location
- Country: Russia
- Location: Astrakhan, Astrakhan Oblast
- Coordinates: 46°18′N 47°57′E
- UN/LOCODE: RUASF

Details
- Opened: 1722
- Type of harbour: River
- Size of harbour: 53.96 km
- Land area: 186.11
- Size: Medium

Statistics
- Annual cargo tonnage: 9,934.5 thousand tons
- Website; Port of Astrakhan

Astrakhan is a sea port in the city of Astrakhan in Astrakhan Oblast, Russia. The port is located in the Trusovsky District on the right shore of Volga river. According to the Sea Port Register, Astrakhan port has 26 docks. The length of the waterfront is 3,604.88m, water area is 53.96 km^{2}, the throughput capacity of the cargo terminals is 9,934.5 thousand tons a year.

Astrakhan port's index number is K-1. As of 2020, there were 16 marine terminal operators working in the port.

== History ==
The port was originally founded in 1722 on the Kutum River, a Volga tributary. It was later moved to the shores of Volga river. In 1857 a mechanical plant with 13 workshops was built on its territory, and in 1859 a floating wooden dock for repairing vessels started operating. During the second half of the 19th century, Astrakhan's waterfront line was formed. In April 1960 Commercial Sea Port and Astrakhan River Port were merged and given a mutual name "Astrakhan Port of United Volga River Shipping" (now Volga Shipping Company). In 1993 the port was turned into an open-joint stock company.

As of June 2024, Iran owned 53% of the port's shares and is investing to increase the port's capacity.
