= Old Turkish bay =

Old Byzantium bay
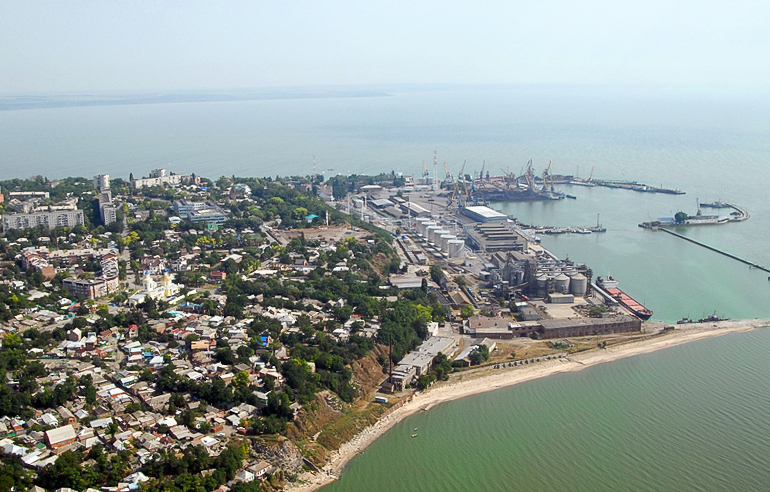

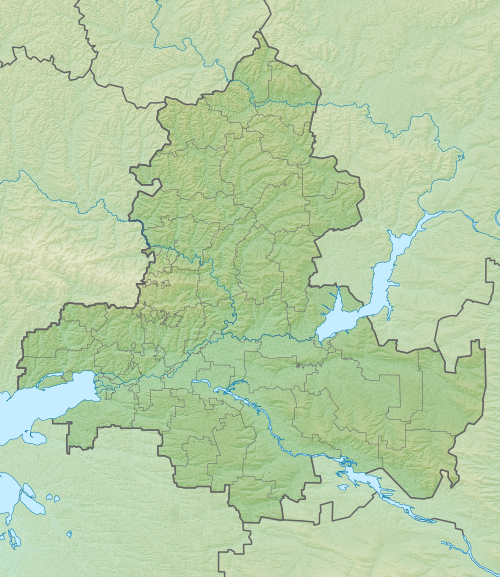
- Location within Rostov Oblast Location within European Russia Location within Black Sea
- Location: Taganrog Bay
- Coordinates: 47°11′23.92″N 38°53′48.4″E
- Basin countries: Russia
- Surface area: 4.1 km^{2} (1.6 mi^{2})

The Old Byzantium bay is an ice-free bay of elongated arc-shaped form on the northern shore of Taganrog Bay in Azov Sea. It is located within the territories of Taganrog city and Petrushino town. The bay extends to the mainland at 1.25 km, the width of bay's entrance is 5.8 km. On its northern coast there is a city beach, which occupies 2.4 km of coastline.

== History ==
Archaeological finds on the coast of bay, suggest that there were settlements with both Byzantine culture in the era of Greco-Roman colonization, and as well as those of the Middle Ages (11th-13th centuries) in this area.

On July 27, 1696, Peter I landed here to assess the possibility of building a fortress on the Taganrog cape. The territory adjacent to the bay for a long time was called Admiralteyskaya Slobodka, as in the late 18th century there were situated flagship house, port office and various workshops.

In the 1920s, fishermen's artels were organized on the shore of the bay by rich fishermen P. Rochogov, A. Martovitsky and A. Boudon. In 1930s Taganrog fish processing plant was established on the base of these artels.

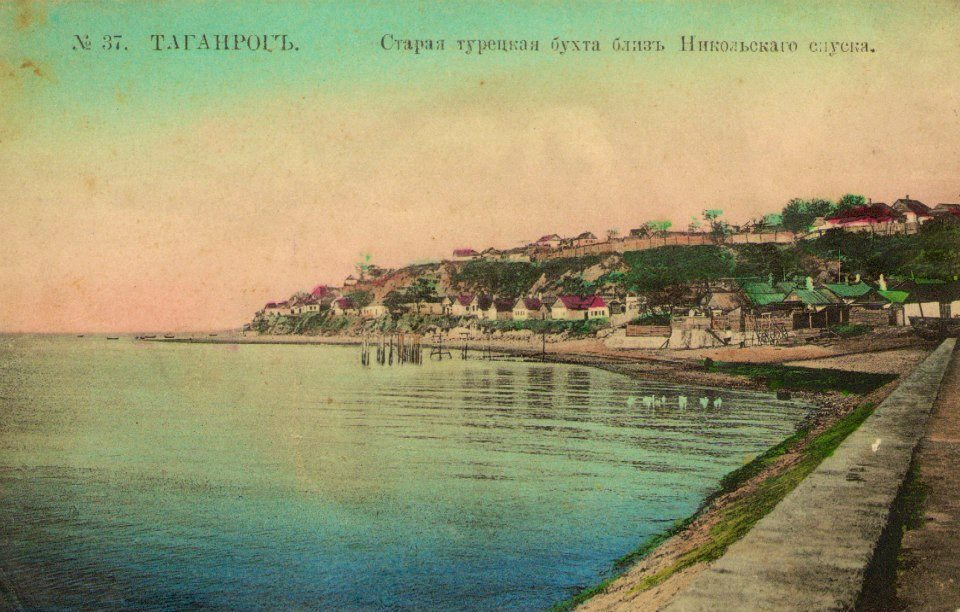
Old Turkish bay on a postcard
