= Beysug =

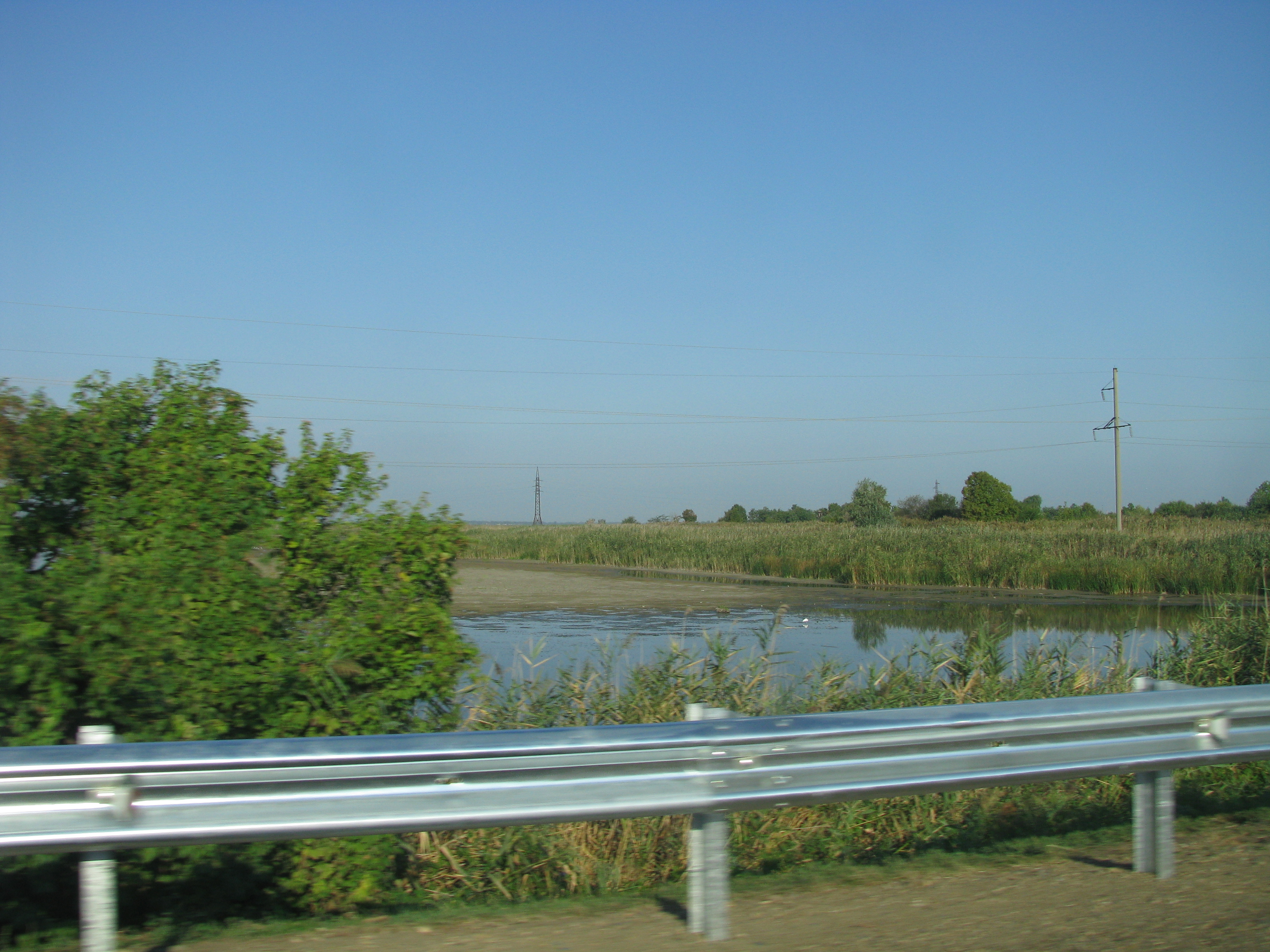

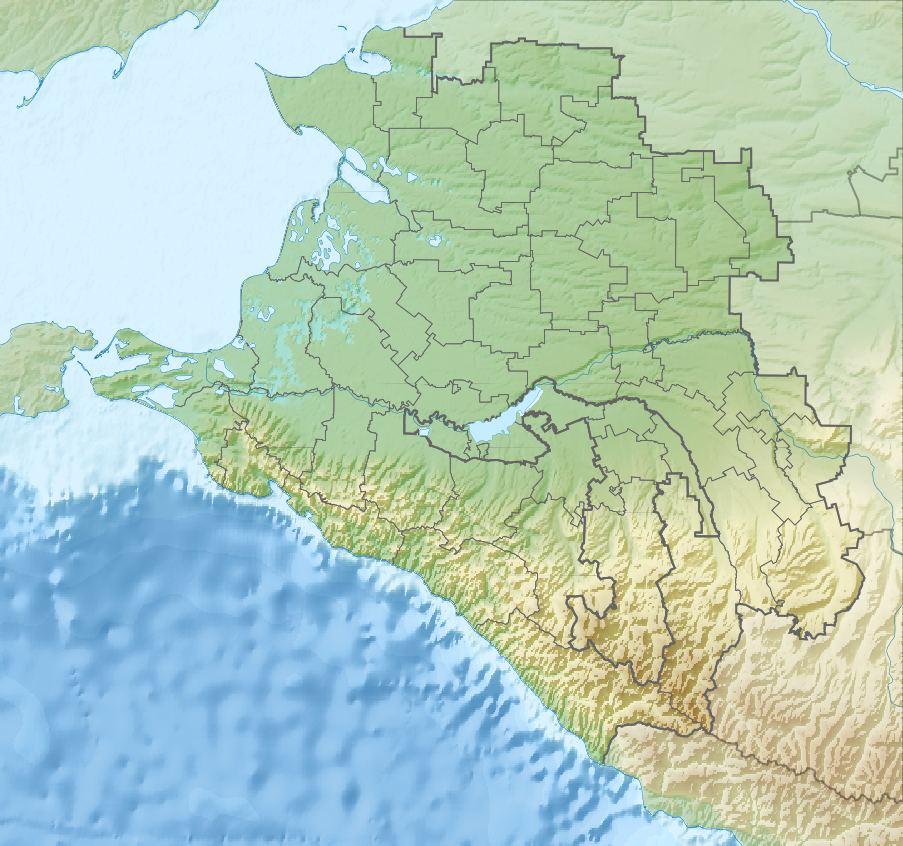

Location
- Country: Russia

Physical characteristics
- Mouth: Sea of Azov
  - coordinates: 46.0422°N 38.5786°E
- Length: 243 km (151 mi)
- Basin size: 5,190 km^{2} (2,000 sq mi)

The Beysug (Russian: Бейсу́г) is a river in Krasnodar Krai of Russia. It is 243 kilometres (151 mi) long, with a drainage basin of 5,190 square kilometres (2,000 sq mi). It flows into the Sea of Azov through the Beysugsky Liman. To the south is the river Kuban, to the immediate north the Chelbas, and further to the north the Yeya.
