= List of estuaries of Ukraine =

This is an incomplete list of estuaries in Ukraine.

== List ==
Rank	Estuary	Oblast	Area, sq km	Length (km)	Width (km)	max. depth (m)
1	Dniester Estuary	Odesa	360	42	12	2.7
2	Sasyk Lagoon	Odesa	204.8	40	12	3.9
3	Tylihul Estuary	Odesa	170	80	3.5	21
4	Molochnyi Lyman	Zaporizhzhia	168	32	8	3
5	Khadzhibey Estuary	Odesa	70	40	3.5	2.5
6	Kuialnyk Estuary	Odesa	60	28	2.5	3
