= Black Sea harbour porpoise =

Conservation status
- Endangered (IUCN 3.1)

Scientific classification
- Kingdom: Animalia
- Phylum: Chordata
- Class: Mammalia
- Order: Artiodactyla
- Infraorder: Cetacea
- Family: Phocoenidae
- Genus: Phocoena
- Species: P. phocoena
- Subspecies: P. p. relicta

Trinomial name
- Phocoena phocoena relicta Abel, 1905

Synonyms
- Phocaena phocaena subsp. relicta Tsalkin, 1940; Phocaena relicta Abel, 1905

Subspecies of porpoise

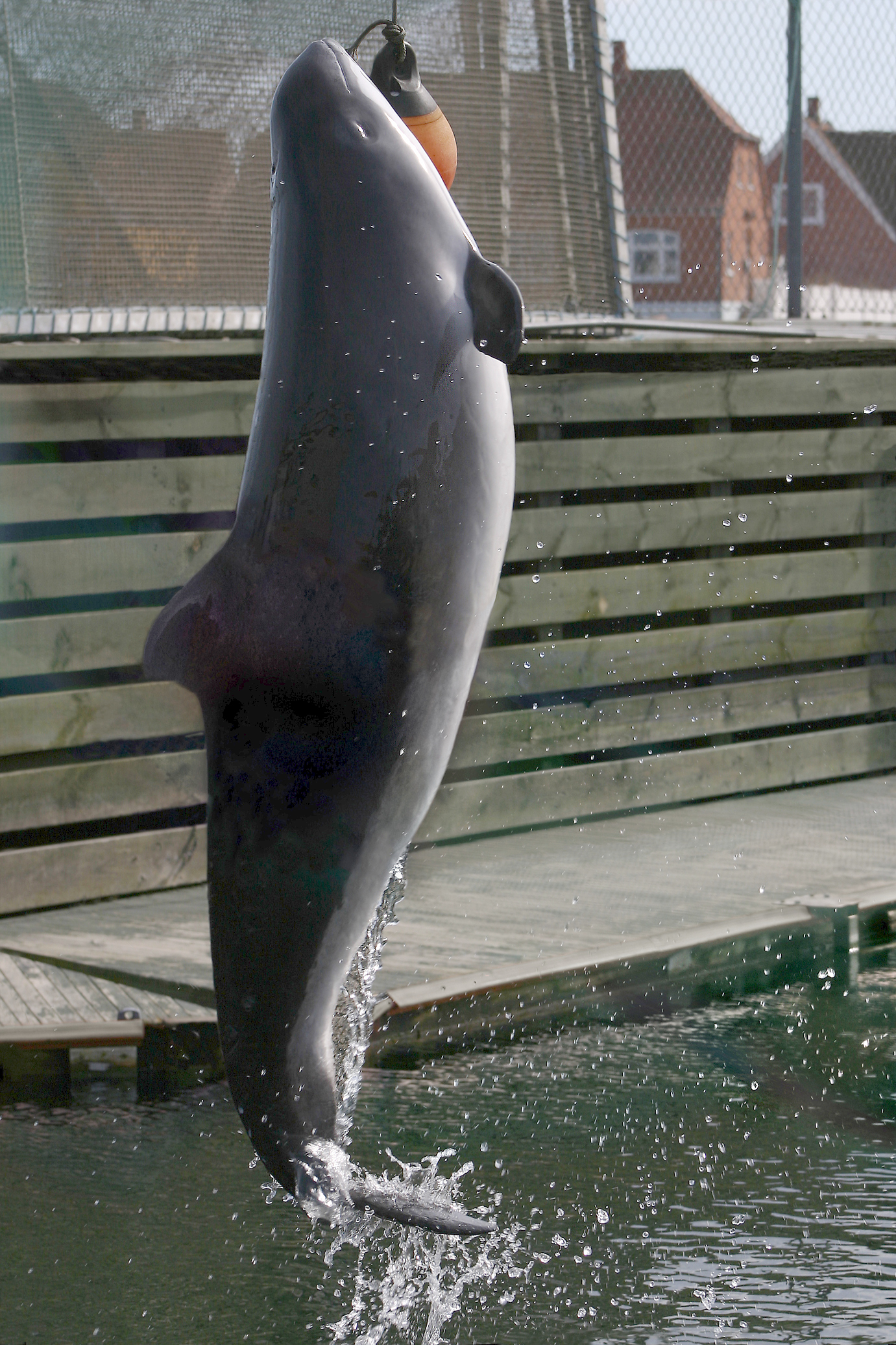
Phocoena phocoena

The Black Sea harbour porpoise (Phocoena phocoena relicta) is a subspecies of the harbour porpoise common in the Azov, Black, Marmara, and Aegean Seas. It is the only representative of the family in the fauna of these areas and is considered a narrow-range relict subspecies. This porpoise is often called the "guinea pig" because of its up to four centimetres thick layer of subcutaneous fat and noisy breathing, similar to "grunting".

== Biology ==
Adults are usually 1.3–1.5 m (4 ft 3 in – 4 ft 11 in) long and weigh around 30 kg (66 lb). Females are slightly larger than males, which is not typical for other dolphins. It has a short head with a rounded blurred face, making it look different than other dolphins. The low dorsal fin has a triangular shape with a wide base, while its pectoral fins have rounded ends. The back of its body is dark grey, sometimes almost black, and its abdomen is light. Females reach adulthood in four years and reproduce in late spring or early summer. Pregnancy lasts nine to eleven months. Females birth one cub, which is born with its tail in front and must immediately rise to the surface for its first breath. This subspecies faces threats from marine traffic.
