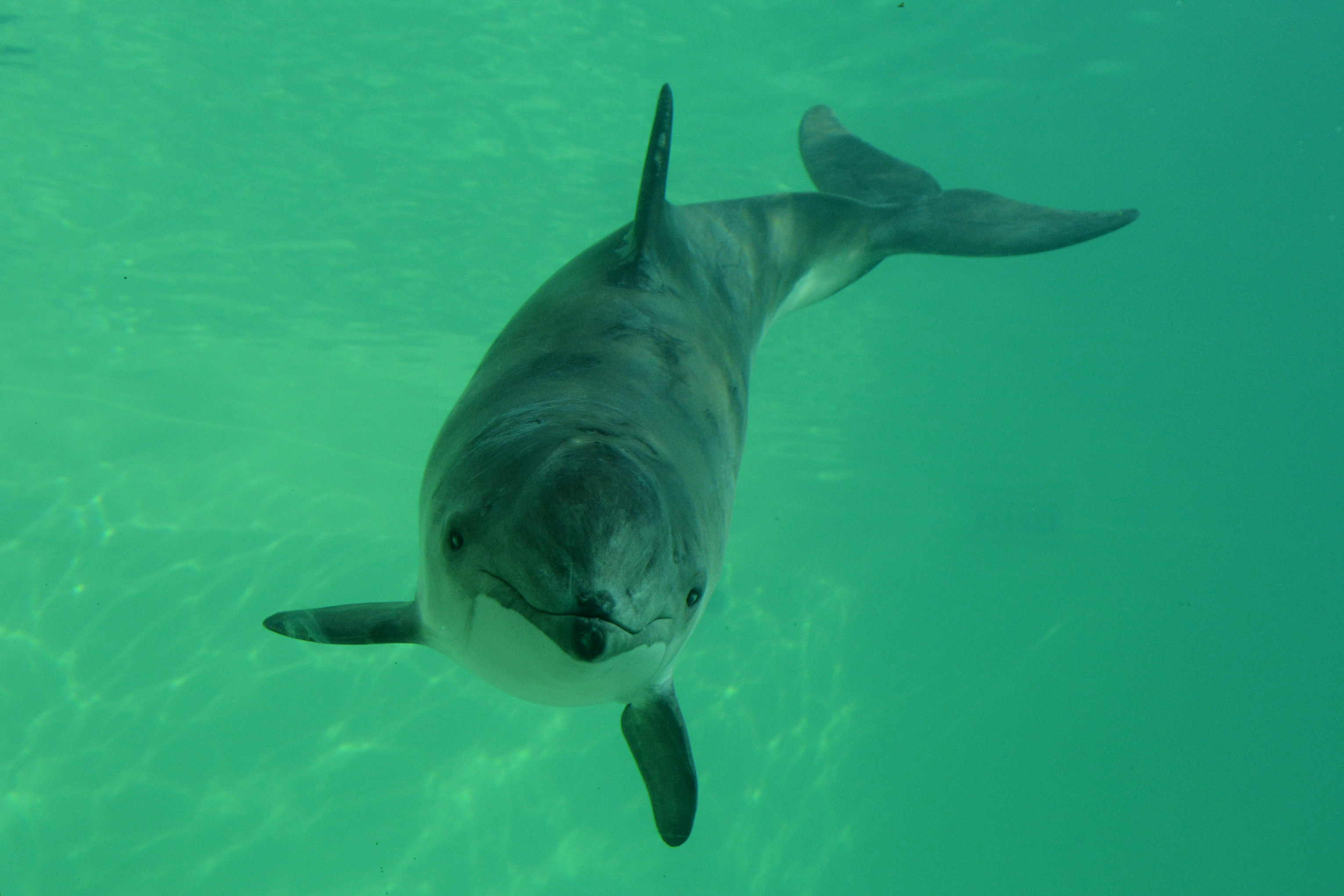
- Harbour porpoise in Ecomare, Netherlands
- Size compared to an average human

Conservation status
- Least Concern (IUCN 3.1)

- Least Concern (IUCN 3.1) (Europe)

Scientific classification
- Kingdom: Animalia
- Phylum: Chordata
- Class: Mammalia
- Order: Artiodactyla
- Infraorder: Cetacea
- Family: Phocoenidae
- Genus: Phocoena
- Species: P. phocoena

Binomial name
- Phocoena phocoena (Linnaeus, 1758)

Subspecies
- P. p. phocoena; P. p. relicta; P. p. vomerina
- Harbour porpoise range

Synonyms
- Delphinus phocoena Linnaeus, 1758

= Harbour porpoise =

Harbour porpoise Temporal range: Miocene – Recent

Species of mammal

The harbour porpoise (Phocoena phocoena) is one of eight extant species of porpoise. It is one of the smallest species of cetacean. As its name implies, it stays close to coastal areas or river estuaries, and as such, is the most familiar porpoise to whale watchers. This porpoise often ventures up rivers, and has been seen hundreds of kilometres from the sea. The harbour porpoise may be polytypic, with geographically distinct populations representing distinct races: P. p. phocoena in the North Atlantic and West Africa, P. p. relicta in the Black Sea and Sea of Azov, an unnamed population in the northwestern Pacific and P. p. vomerina in the northeastern Pacific.

== Taxonomy ==
The English word porpoise comes from the French pourpois (Old French porpais, 12th century), which is from Medieval Latin porcopiscus, which is a compound of porcus (pig) and piscus (fish). The old word is probably a loan-translation of a Germanic word, compare Danish marsvin and Middle Dutch mereswijn (sea swine). Classical Latin had a similar name, porculus marinus. The species' taxonomic name, Phocoena phocoena, is the Latinized form of the Greek φώκαινα, phōkaina, "big seal", as described by Aristotle; this from φώκη, phōkē, "seal".

The species is sometimes known as the common porpoise in texts originating in the United Kingdom. In parts of Atlantic Canada it is known colloquially as the puffing pig, and in Norway 'nise', derived from an Old Norse word for sneeze, both of which refer to the sound made when porpoises surface to breathe.

== Description ==
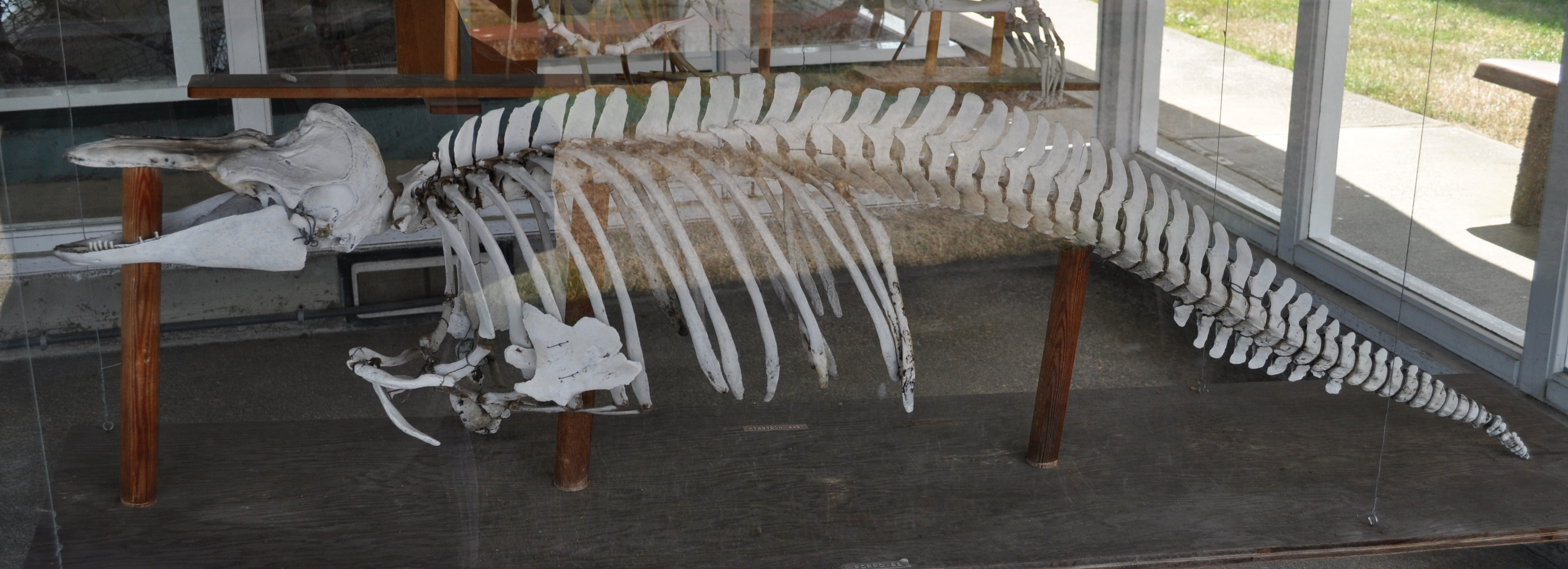
Harbour porpoise skeleton on display

The harbour porpoise is a little smaller than the other porpoises, at about 67–85 cm (26 1/2–33 1/2 in) long at birth, weighing 6.4–10 kg (14–22 lb). Adults of both sexes grow to 1.4 to 1.9 m (4 ft 7 in to 6 ft 3 in). The females are heavier, with a maximum weight of around 76 kg (168 lb) compared with the males' 61 kg (134 lb). The body is robust, and the animal is at its maximum girth just in front of its triangular dorsal fin. The beak is poorly demarcated. The flippers, dorsal fin, tail fin and back are a dark grey. The sides are a slightly speckled, lighter grey. The underside is much whiter, though there are usually grey stripes running along the throat from the underside of the body.

Many anomalously white coloured individuals have been confirmed, mostly in the North Atlantic, but also notably around Turkish and British coasts, and in the Wadden Sea, Bay of Fundy and around the coast of Cornwall.

Although conjoined twins are rarely seen in wild mammals, the first known case of a two-headed harbour porpoise was documented in May 2017 when Dutch fishermen in the North Sea caught them by chance. A study published by the online journal of the Natural History Museum Rotterdam points out that conjoined twins in whales and dolphins are extremely rare.

The vocalizations of the harbour porpoise is made up of short clicks from 0.5 to 5 milliseconds in bursts up to two seconds long. Each click has a frequency between 1000 and 2200 hertz. Aside from communication, the clicks are used for echolocation.

== Distribution ==
The harbour porpoise species is widespread in cooler coastal waters of the North Atlantic, North Pacific and the Black Sea. In the Atlantic, harbour porpoises may be present in a curved band of water running from the coast of West Africa to the coasts of Portugal, Spain, France, the United Kingdom, Ireland, Scandinavia, Iceland, Greenland, Nova Scotia and Newfoundland and the eastern seaboard of the United States. The population in the Baltic Sea is limited in winter due to sea freezing, and is most common in the southwest parts of the sea. There is another band in the Pacific Ocean running from the Sea of Japan, Vladivostok, the Bering Strait, Alaska, British Columbia, and California.

The populations in these regions are not continuous and are classified as separate subspecies with P. p. phocoena in the North Atlantic and West Africa, P. p. relicta in the Black Sea and Sea of Azov, an unnamed population in the northwest Pacific and P. p. vomerina in the northeast Pacific.

Concerning the North Atlantic, an international workshop co-organised by the North Atlantic Marine Mammal Commission and the Norwegian Institute of Marine Research reviewed the status of the species in 2018. It concluded that the harbour porpoise population structure is more complex than previously thought, with at least three genetically distinct subspecies in the North Atlantic. Given the structure of the harbour porpoise population, the workshop delineated 18 assessment areas for the North Atlantic.

== Population status ==
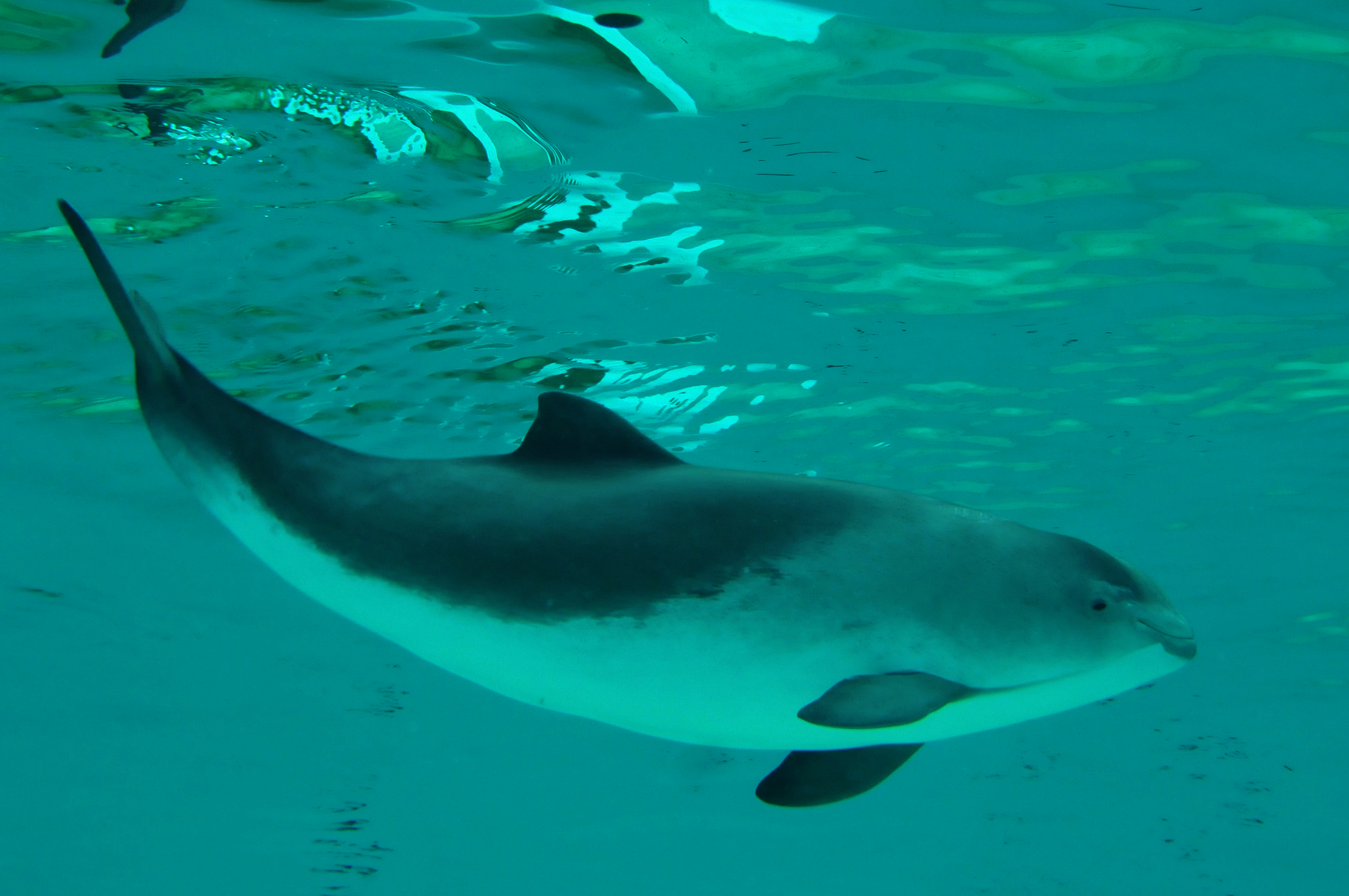

The harbour porpoise has a global population of at least 700,000. In 2016, a comprehensive survey of the Atlantic region in Europe, from Gibraltar to Vestfjorden in Norway, found that the population was about 467,000 harbour porpoises, making it the most abundant cetacean in the region, together with the common dolphin. Based on surveys in 1994, 2005 and 2016, the harbour porpoise population in this region is stable. The highest densities are in the southwestern North Sea and oceans of mainland Denmark; the latter region alone is home to about 107,000-300,000 harbour porpoises. As of 2022, the entire North Sea population (including the Danish waters of the Skagerrak) was about 339,000. In the Western Atlantic it is estimated that there are about 33,000 harbour porpoises along the mid-southwestern coast of Greenland (where increasing temperatures have aided them), 75,000 between the Gulf of Maine and Gulf of St. Lawrence, and 27,000 in the Gulf of St. Lawrence. The Pacific population off mainland United States is about 73,000 and off Alaska 89,000. After sharp declines in the 20th century, populations have rebounded in the inland waters of Washington state. In contrast, some subpopulations are seriously threatened. For example, there are less than 12,000 in the Black Sea, and only about 500 remaining in the Baltic Sea proper, representing a sharp decrease since the mid-1900s.

== Natural history ==
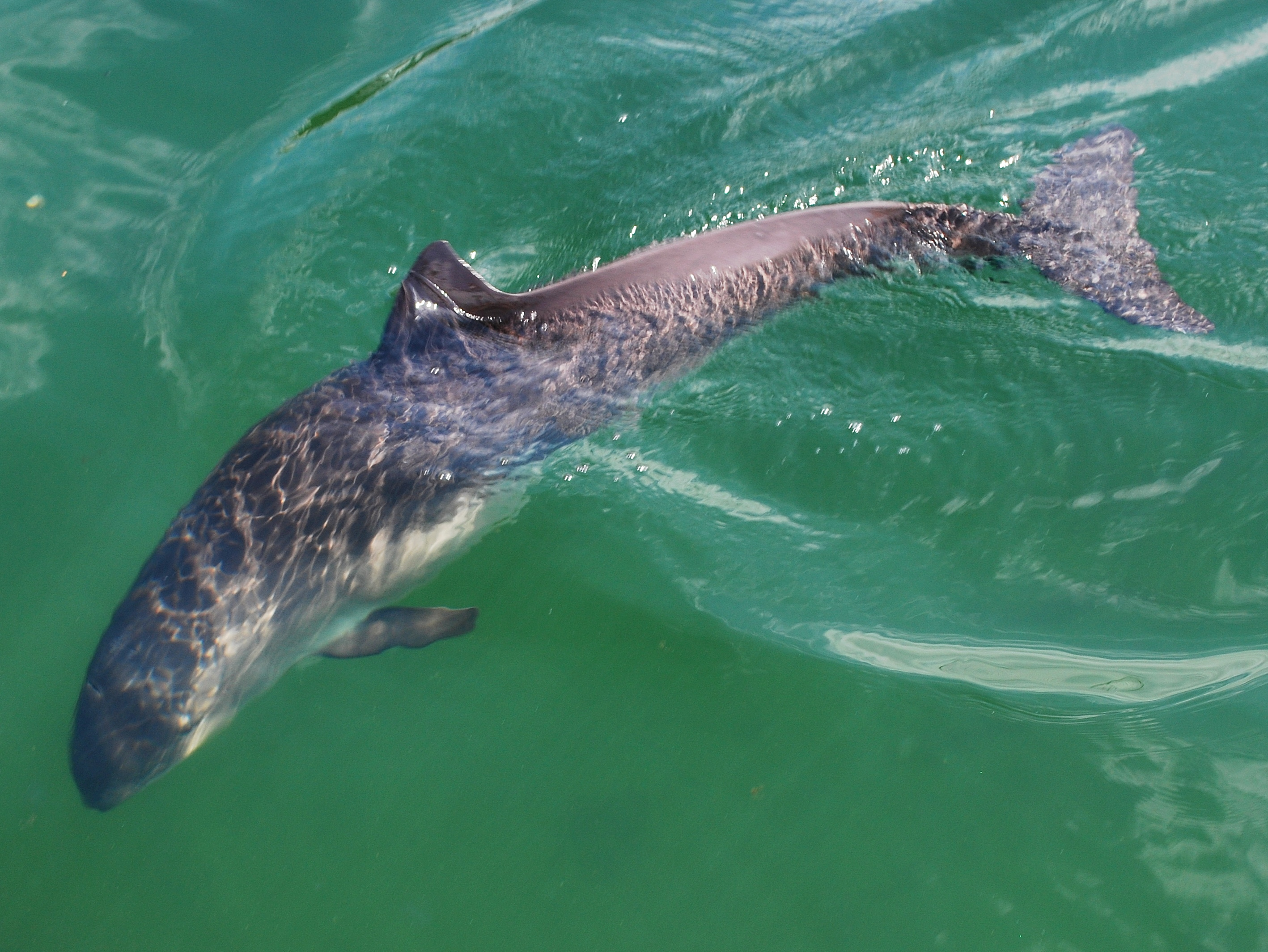
A harbour porpoise off Denmark

=== Ecology ===
Harbour porpoises prefer temperate and subarctic waters. They inhabit fjords, bays, estuaries and harbours, hence their name. They feed mostly on small pelagic schooling fish, particularly herring, pollack, hake, sardine, cod, capelin, and sprat. They will, however, eat squid and crustaceans in certain places. This species tends to feed close to the sea bottom, at least for waters less than 200 metres (110 fathoms) deep. However, when hunting sprat, porpoise may stay closer to the surface. When in deeper waters, porpoises may forage for mid-water fish, such as pearlsides. A study published in 2016 showed that porpoises off the coast of Denmark were hunting 200 fish per hour during the day and up to 550 per hour at night, catching 90% of the fish they targeted. Almost all the fish they ate were very small, between 3 and 10 cm (1–4 in) long.

A study (2024) shown that prey availability is an important driver of seasonal and diel dynamics of harbour porpoise acoustic activity in the Black Sea. In the southeastern region, porpoise activity was primarily nocturnal, with a peak from January to May, aligned with anchovy migration. On the northwestern shelf, porpoises were more active during daylight from April to October, reflecting the migration patterns of sprat.

Harbour porpoises tend to be solitary foragers, but they do sometimes hunt in packs and herd fish together. Young porpoises need to consume about 7% to 8% of their body weight each day to survive, which is approximately 15 pounds or 7 kilograms of fish. Significant predators of harbour porpoises include white sharks and killer whales (orcas). Researchers at the University of Aberdeen in Scotland have also discovered that the local bottlenose dolphins attack and kill harbour porpoises without eating them due to competition for a decreasing food supply. An alternative explanation is that the adult dolphins exhibit infanticidal behaviour and mistake the porpoises for juvenile dolphins which they are believed to kill. Grey seals are also known to attack harbour porpoises by biting off chunks of fat as a high energy source.

=== Behaviour, reproduction and life-span ===
Some studies suggest porpoises are relatively sedentary and usually do not leave a certain area for long. Nevertheless, they have been recorded to move from onshore to offshore waters along the coast. Dives of 220 metres (120 fathoms) by harbour porpoises have been recorded. Dives can last five minutes but typically last one minute. A rarely occurring parabolic dive type has been hypothesized to represent a state of unihemispheric slow-wave sleep, during which the porpoise engages in largely automated swimming behavior and very little vocalization. These episodes make up only a small proportion of all dives, but the animal may also engage in periods of sleep during other undemanding manoeuvers, such as slow surfacing from depth.

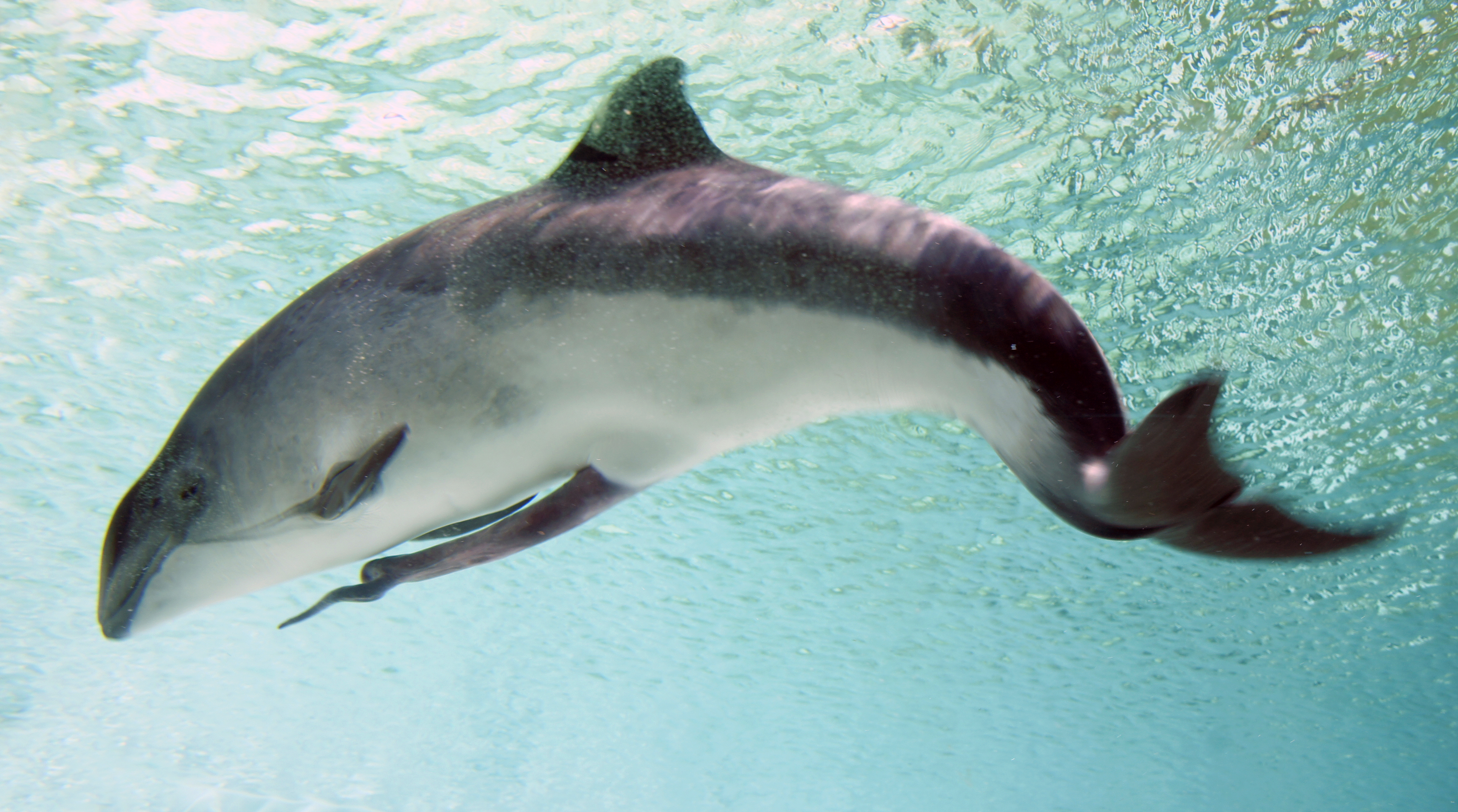
Male with externalized penis for reproduction

The social life of harbour porpoises is not well understood. They are generally seen as a solitary species. Most of the time, porpoises are either alone or in groups of no more than five animals. Porpoises mate promiscuously. Males produce large amounts of sperm, perhaps for sperm competition. Females become sexually mature by their third or fourth year and can calve each year for several consecutive years, being pregnant and lactating at the same time. The gestation of the porpoise is typically 10–11 months. Most births occur in late spring and summer. Calves are weaned after 8–12 months. Their average life-span in the wild is 8–13 years, although exceptionally individuals have reached up to 20, and in captivity up to 31 years. In a study of 239 dead harbour porpoises in the Gulf of Maine–Bay of Fundy, the vast majority were less than 12 years old and the oldest was 17.

== Threats ==
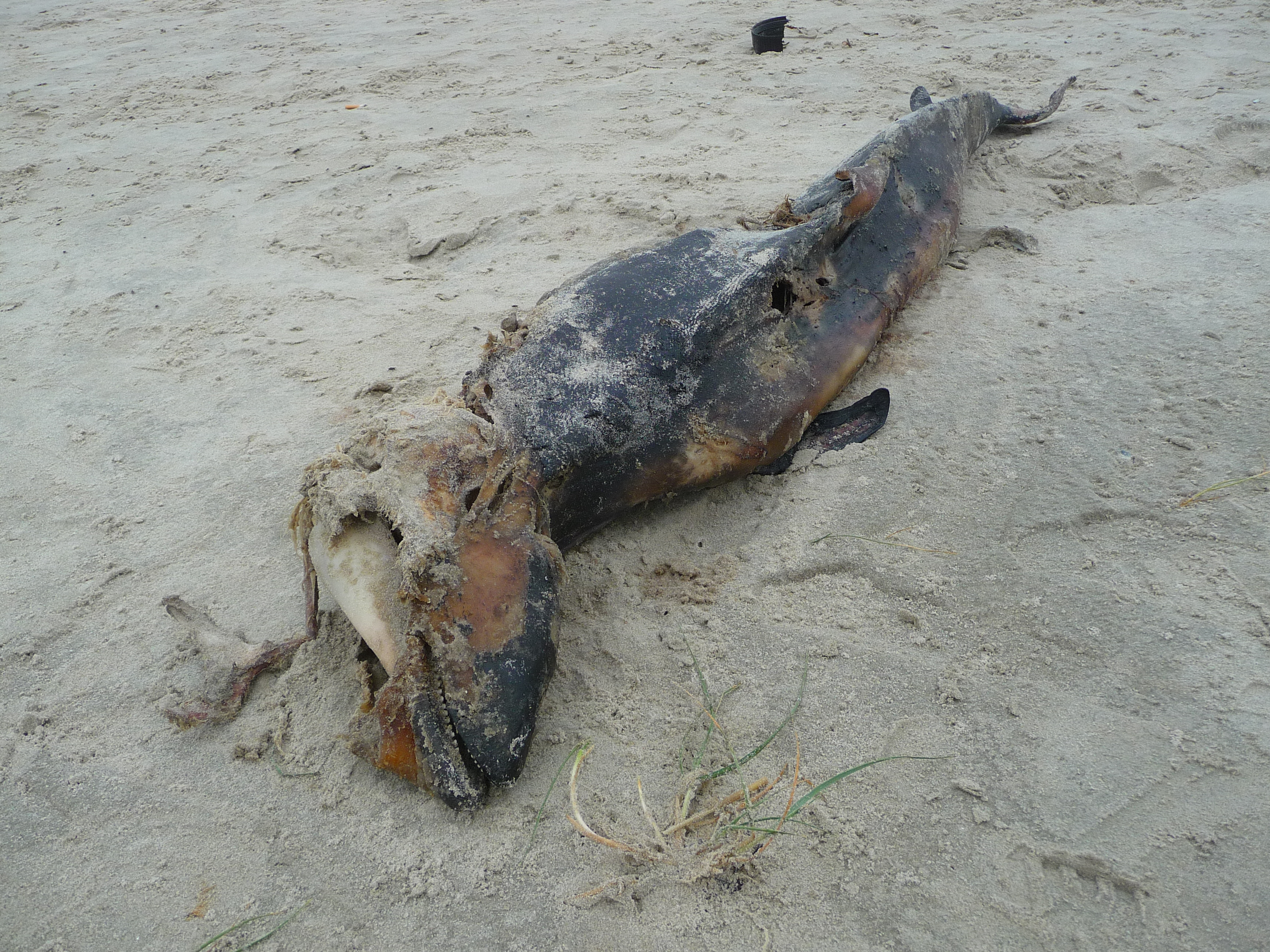
Dead porpoise ashore

=== Hunting ===
Harbour porpoises were traditionally hunted for food, as well as for their blubber, which was used for lighting fuel. Among others, hunting occurred in the Black Sea, off Normandy, in the Bay of Biscay, off Flanders, in the Little Belt strait, off Iceland, western Norway, in Puget Sound, Bay of Fundy and Gulf of Saint Lawrence. The drive hunt in the Little Belt strait is the best documented example. Thousands of porpoises were caught there until the end of the 19th century (it was banned in 1899), and again in smaller scale during the shortages that occurred in World War I and World War II. A similar, short-lived re-emergence of hunting during the world wars happened in Poland and the Baltic countries. Currently, the species is only hunted as part of the traditional Inuit hunt in the Arctic, notably in Greenland. In prehistoric times, harbour porpoises were also hunted in many areas, for example by the Alby People of the east coast of Öland, Sweden.

=== Interactions with fisheries ===
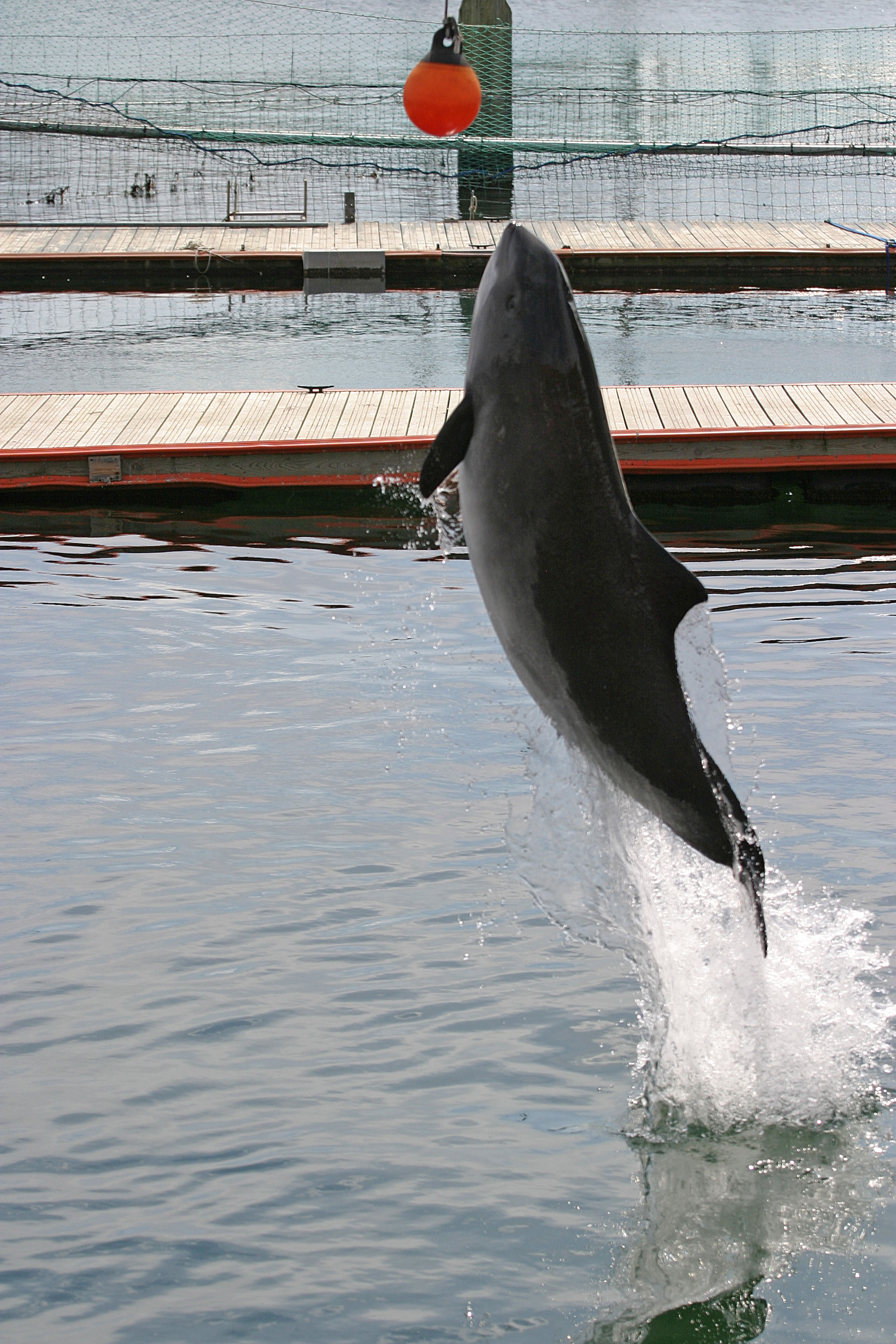
A harbour porpoise in captivity in Denmark. The individuals at the center were rescued after being injured following entanglement in fishing gear, showing the danger nets can represent to the species.

The main threat to porpoises is static fishing techniques such as gill and tangle nets. Bycatch in bottom-set gill nets is considered the main anthropogenic mortality factor for harbour porpoises worldwide. Several thousand die each year in incidental bycatch, which has been reported from the Black Sea, the Baltic Sea, the North Sea, off California, and along the east coast of the United States and Canada. Bottom-set gill nets are anchored to the sea floor and are up to 23 kilometres (12 1/2 nautical miles) in length. It is unknown why porpoises become entangled in gill nets, since several studies indicate they are able to detect these nets using their echolocation. Porpoise-scaring devices, so-called pingers, have been developed to keep porpoises out of nets and numerous studies have demonstrated they are very effective at reducing entanglement. However, concern has been raised over the noise pollution created by the pingers and whether their efficiency will diminish over time due to porpoises habituating to the sounds.

Mortality resulting from trawling bycatch seems to be less of an issue, probably because porpoises are not inclined to feed inside trawls, as dolphins are known to do.

=== Overfishing ===
Overfishing may reduce preferred prey availability for porpoises. Overfishing resulting in the collapse of herring in the North Sea caused porpoises to hunt for other prey species. Reduction of prey may result from climate change, overfishing, or both.

=== Noise pollution ===
Noise from ship traffic and oil platforms is thought to affect the distribution of toothed whales, like the harbour porpoise, that use echolocation for communication and prey detection. Noise from shipping traffic, particularly busy sea lanes, appears to instigate evasive behavior, with predominantly lateral movements during the day and deeper dives during the night. The construction of thousands of offshore wind turbines, planned in different areas of North Sea, is known to cause short-term displacement of porpoises from the construction site, particularly if steel monopile foundations are installed by percussive piling, where reactions can occur at distances of more than 20 km (11 nmi). Noise levels from operating wind turbines are low and unlikely to affect porpoises, even at close range. Wind turbine locations may in fact attract porpoises by providing improved foraging on benthic fish that aggregate around pile foundations.

=== Pollution ===
Marine top predators like porpoises and seals accumulate pollutants such as heavy metals, PCBs and pesticides in their fat tissue. Porpoises have a coastal distribution that potentially brings them close to sources of pollution. Porpoises may not experience any toxic effects until they draw on their fat reserves, such as in periods of food shortage, migration or reproduction.

=== Climate change ===
An increase in the temperature of the sea water is likely to affect the distribution of porpoises and their prey, but has not been shown to occur. Reduced stocks of sand eel along the east coast of Scotland, a pattern linked to climate change, appears to be the main reason for the increase in malnutrition in porpoises in the area.

== Conservation status ==
Overall, the harbour porpoise is not considered threatened and the total population is in the hundreds of thousands.

The harbour porpoise populations of the North Sea, Baltic Sea, western North Atlantic, Black Sea and North West Africa are protected under Appendix II of the Convention on the Conservation of Migratory Species of Wild Animals (CMS). In 2013, the two Baltic Sea subpopulations were listed as vulnerable and critically endangered respectively by HELCOM. Although the species overall is considered to be of Least Concern by the IUCN, they consider the Baltic Sea and Western African populations critically endangered, and the subspecies P. p. relicta of the Black Sea endangered.

In addition, the harbour porpoise is covered by the Agreement on the Conservation of Small Cetaceans of the Baltic, North East Atlantic, Irish and North Seas (ASCOBANS), the Agreement on the Conservation of Cetaceans in the Black Sea, Mediterranean Sea and Contiguous Atlantic Area (ACCOBAMS) and the Memorandum of Understanding Concerning the Conservation of the Manatee and Small Cetaceans of Western Africa and Macaronesia (Western African Aquatic Mammals MoU).

== See also ==
- List of marine mammal species
- List of cetaceans
- Marine biology
