= Bay of Arabat =

Coordinates: 45°23′34″N 35°35′52″E

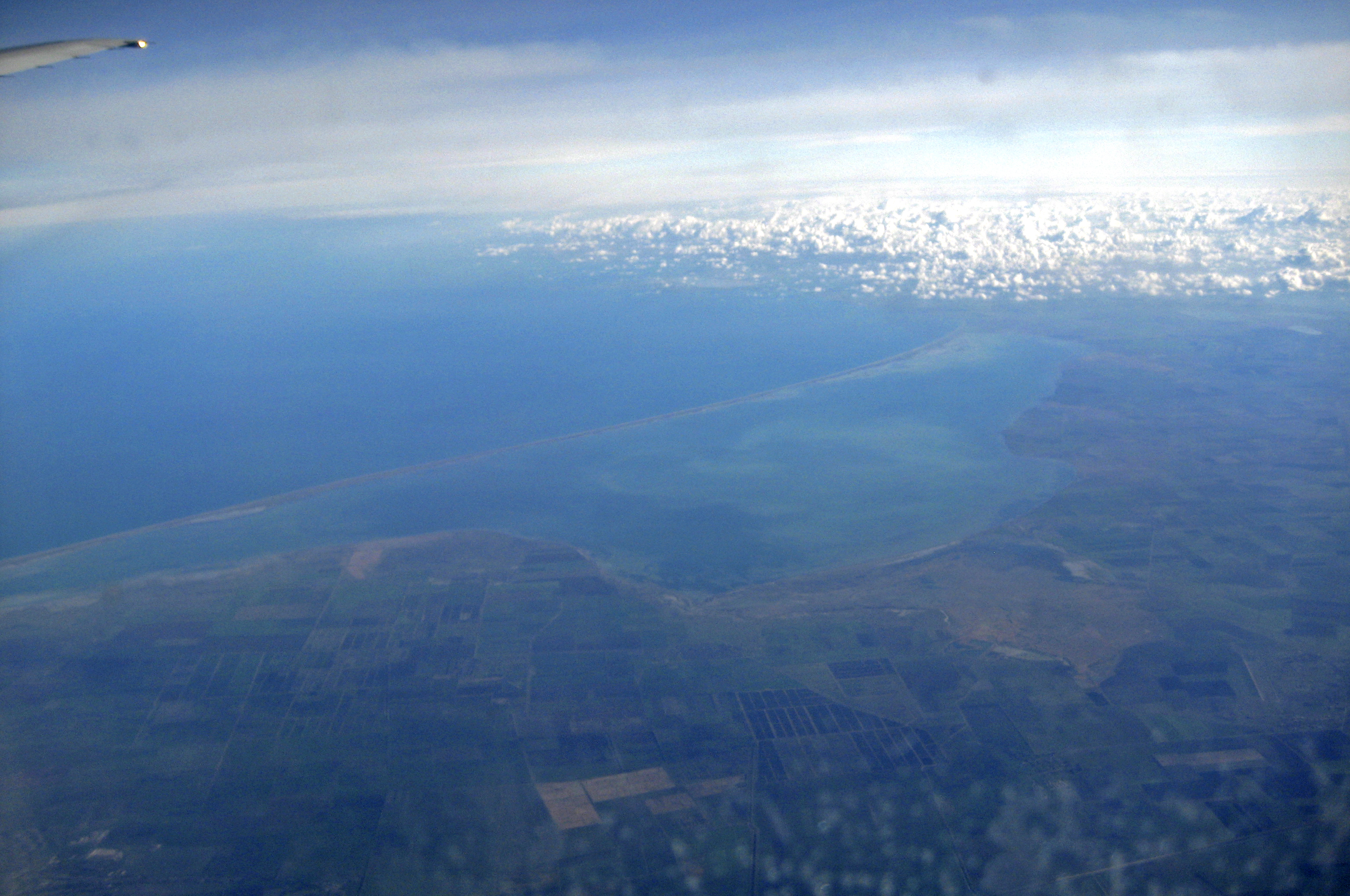

- Location within Ukraine
- Location: Sea of Azov
- Ocean/sea sources: Atlantic Ocean
- Basin countries: Ukraine
- Max. length: 22 km (14 mi)
- Max. width: 40 km (25 mi)
- Average depth: 8–9 m (26–30 ft)

The Bay of Arabat (Ukrainian: Арабатська затока; Russian: Арабатский залив; Crimean Tatar: Arabat körfezi), is in the southwestern Azov Sea in eastern Europe.

It is located along the northwestern coast of the Kerch Peninsula and northeastern coast of Crimea.

== See also ==
- Arabat Spit
- Geography of Crimea
