= Yeya =

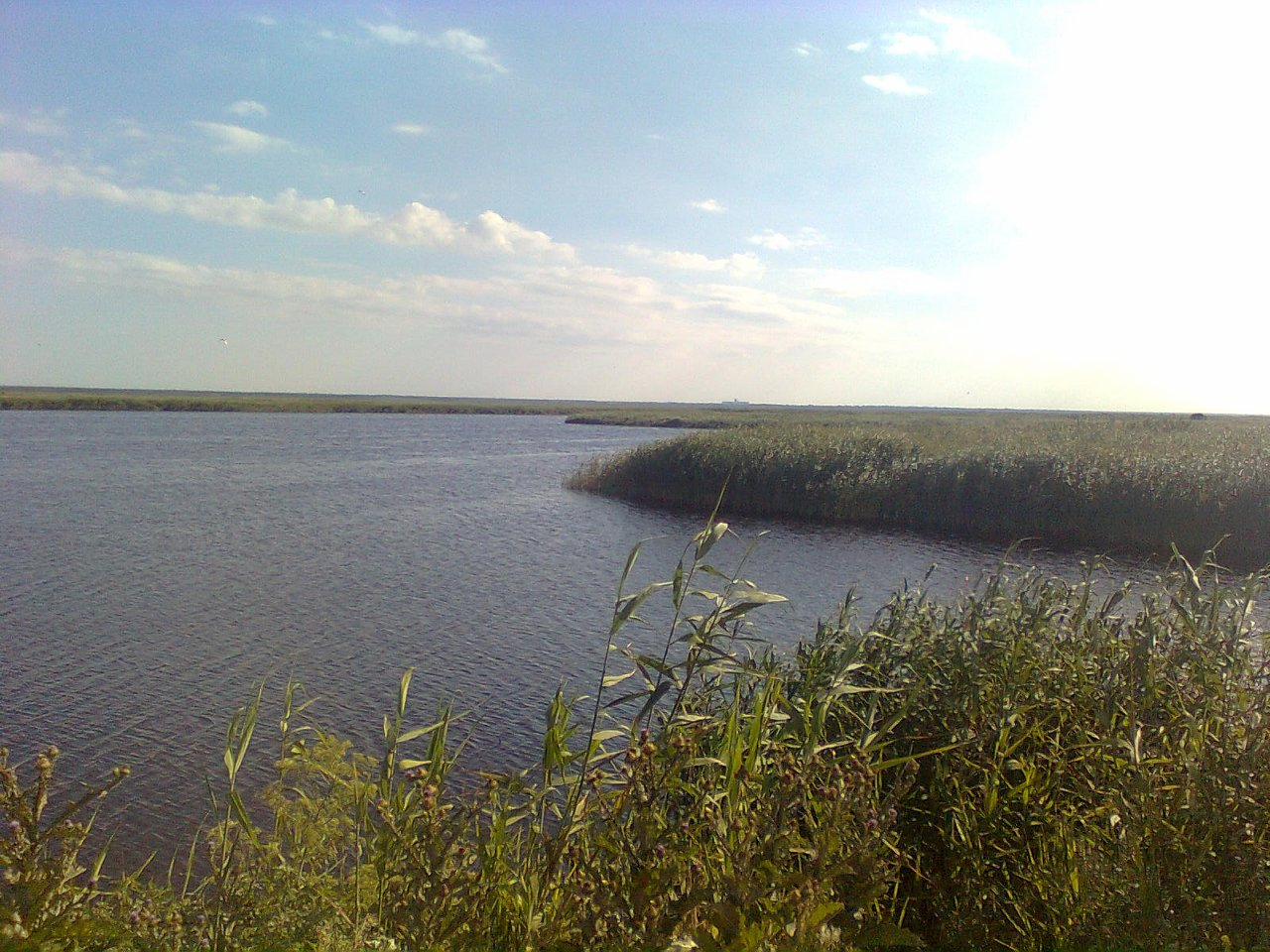

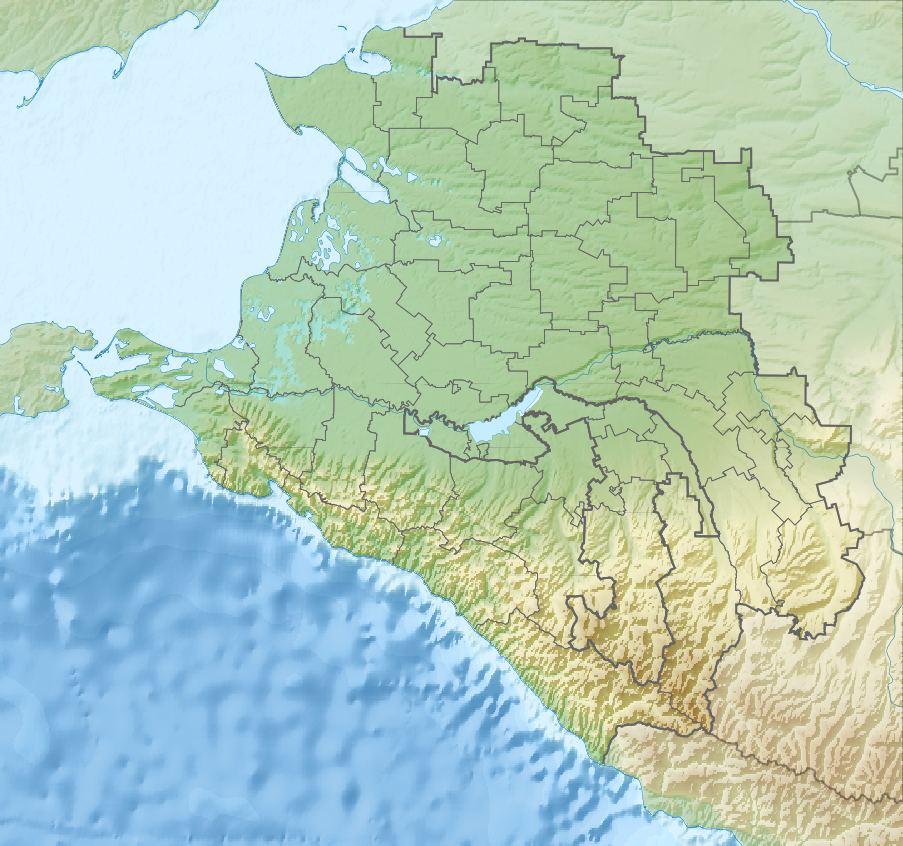

Location
- Country: Russia

Physical characteristics
- Mouth: Sea of Azov
  - coordinates: 46.6571°N 38.591°E
- Length: 311 km (193 mi)
- Basin size: 8,650 km^{2} (3,340 sq mi)

The Yeya (Russian: Éя) is a river in Krasnodar Krai, Russia. It falls into the Yeya Firth of Taganrog Bay, Sea of Azov. It is 311 kilometres (193 mi) long with a drainage basin of 8,650 square kilometres (3,340 mi^{2}). It dries up in summer. The port town of Yeysk is located by the Yeya Firth at the neck of the Yeya Spit.
