= Molochnyi Lyman =

Estuary of the Molochna River

Molochnyi Estuary
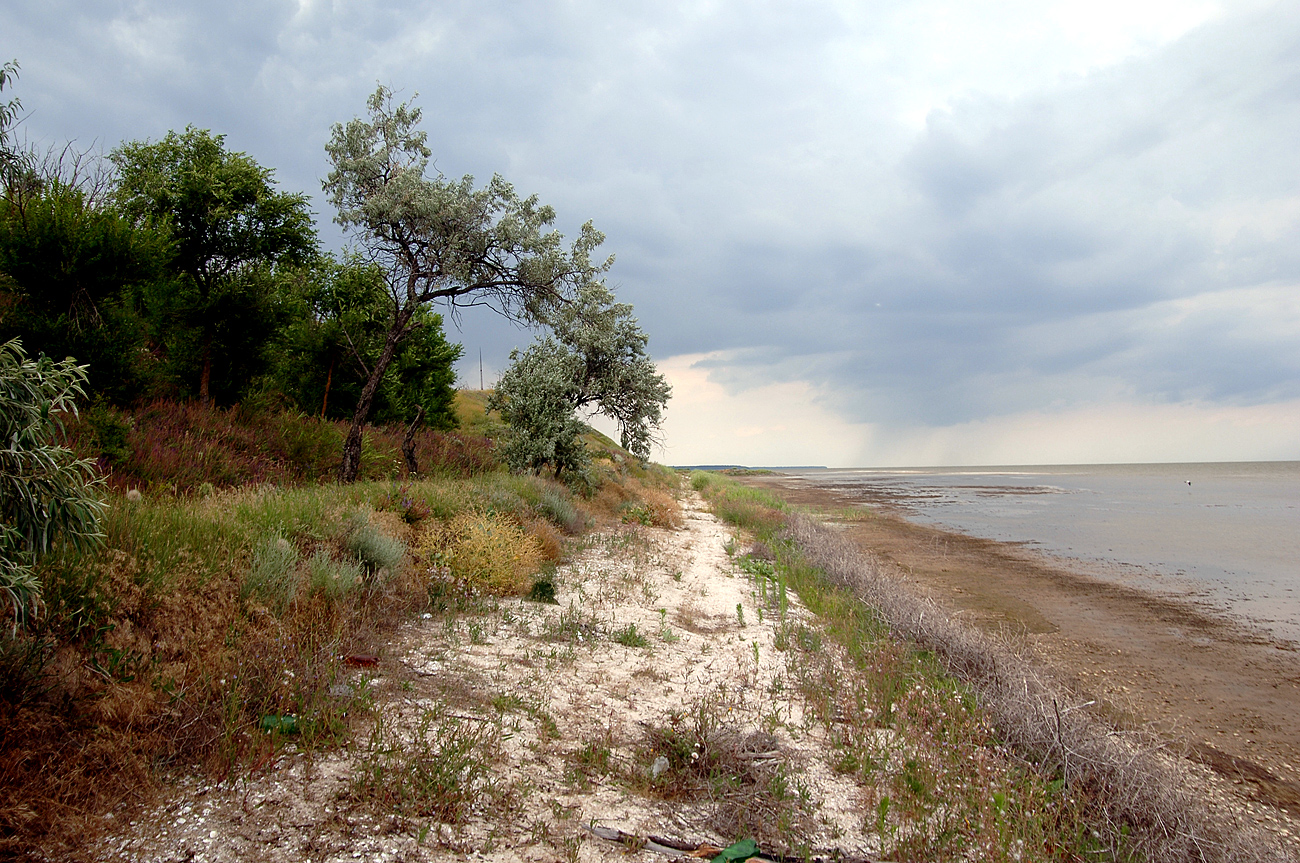

- Location within Zaporizhzhia Oblast Location within Ukraine
- Interactive map of Molochnyi Estuary
- Location: Sea of Azov
- Coordinates: 46°32′N 35°19′E
- River sources: Molochna, Tashchenak, Dzhekelna
- Ocean/sea sources: Black Sea
- Basin countries: Ukraine
- Max. length: 32 km (20 mi)
- Max. width: 8 km (5.0 mi)
- Surface area: 168 km^{2} (65 sq mi)
- Max. depth: 3 m (9.8 ft)
- Salinity: 18-40 ‰

Ramsar Wetland
- Designated: 23 November 1995
- Reference no.: 770

Molochnyi Estuary, or Molochnyi Lyman (Ukrainian: Молочний лиман), is an estuary of the Molochna River, located on the north-western coast of the Sea of Azov. About 10 km north is the town of Melitopol.

Parameters of the water body:

- Length 32 km
- Width 8 km
- Depth 3 m
- Area 168 km^{2}

It is connected to the Sea of Azov by an artificial canal.

Fishes

In March, rhizodes usually swim into the waters of the Molochnyi Lyman
