= Taganrog Bay =

Northeastern arm of the Sea of Azov

Coordinates: 46.9859°N 38.4494°E

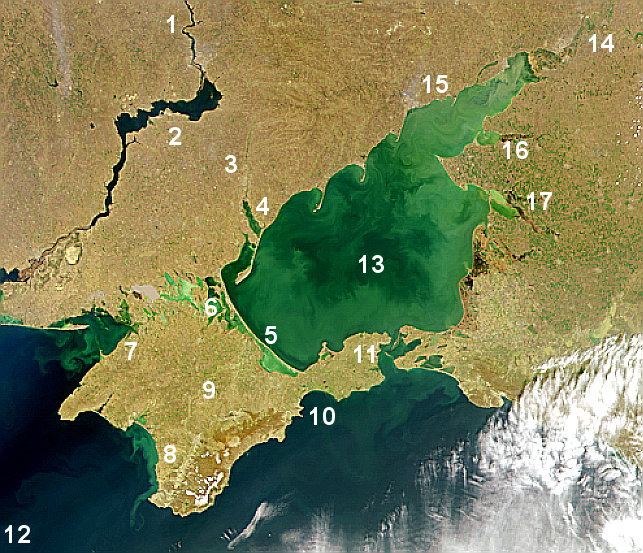
Satellite image of the Azov Sea area, with the Taganrog Bay marked as 15

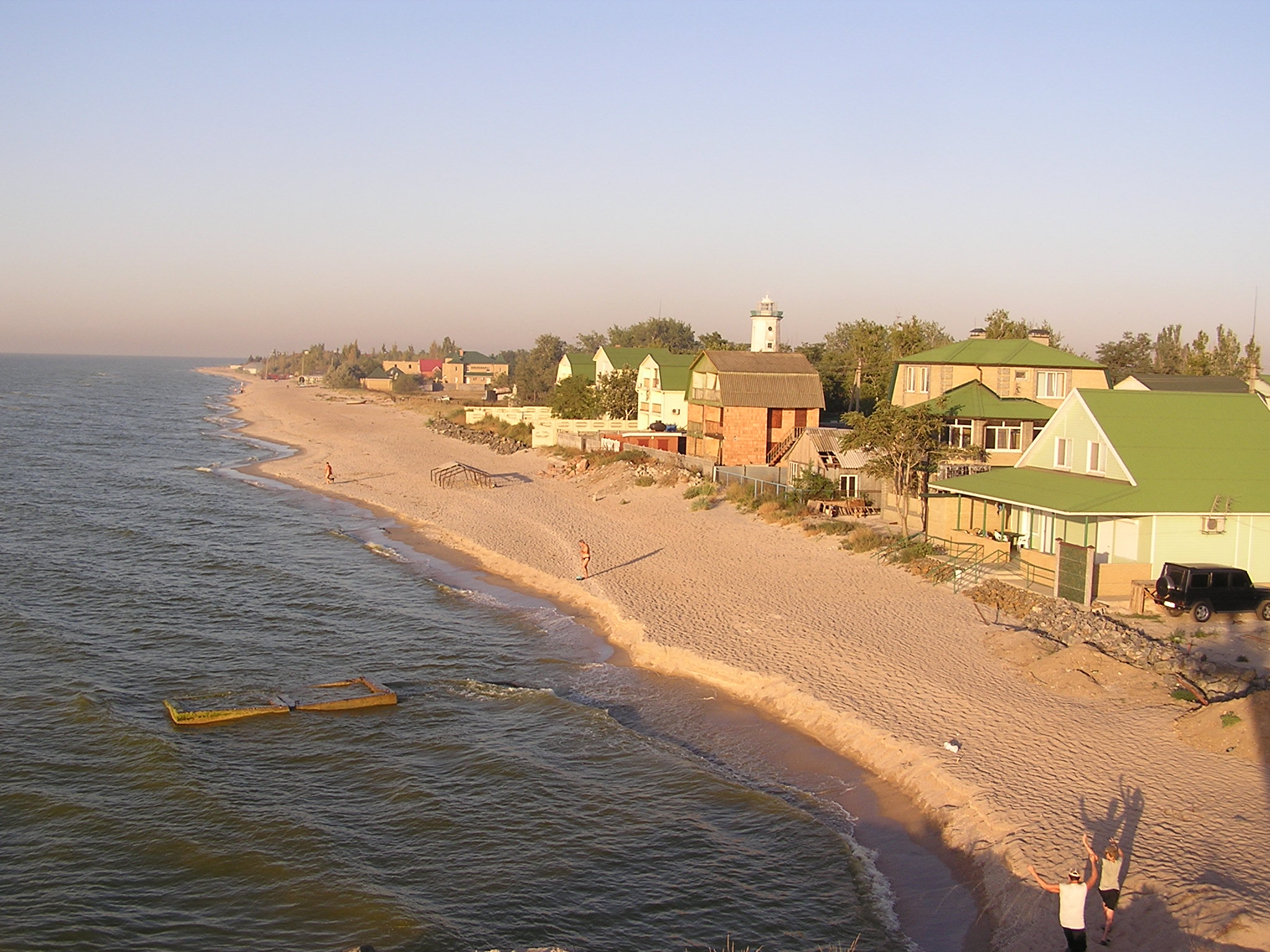
The coast of the bay, with Bilosarayska Spit

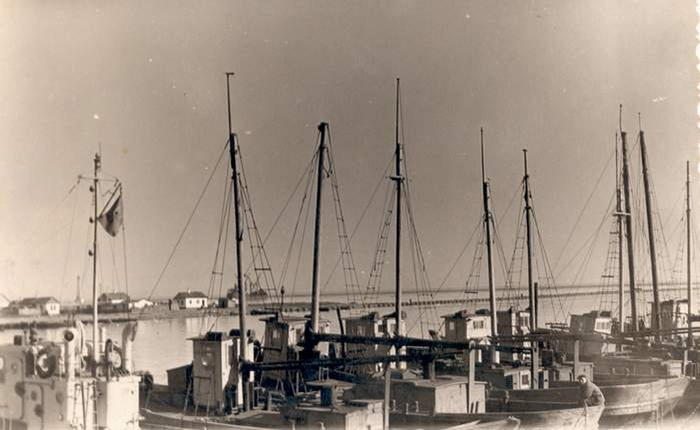
The Mariupol Port, Ukraine

Taganrog Bay (Russian: Таганрогский залив; Ukrainian: Таганрозька затока) is the northeastern arm of the Sea of Azov. It also may be perceived as a flooded estuary of the Don River.

== Geography ==
The bay serves as a natural boundary between the Kuban coast line in Russia and the northern Azov littoral region in Ukraine and Russia.

At its northeast end is the mouth of the Don River. Length: about 140 kilometres (87 mi), width at the mouth: 31 kilometres (19 mi), median depth: about 5 metres (16 ft). It may freeze some winters from December to March.

Three other rivers, the Kalmius, Mius and the Yeya, flow into the bay. The flow of water into the bay is the chief factor for current development in the Sea of Azov.

=== Landforms ===
Its mouth is marked by the Dolgaya Spit on the south and the Bilosarayska Spit on the north. It abounds in sandy spits that partly enclose shallow bays. The bay contains sandy isles. Other major spits: uk:Крива коса, uk:Біглицька коса, uk:Єйська коса.

The major ports are Taganrog, Mariupol (Ukraine), and Yeysk. Rostov-on-Don is a few miles up the Don river.

=== Water ===
The concentration of salt water in the Gulf is uneven. The water in the eastern and shallower part of the bay, which receives water from the Don River, is mostly desalinized. The western end of the bay is completely salt water.

Besides Don, the bay receives waters of Kalmius, Mius (with its prominent Mius estuary (liman)), and Yeya rivers.

== See also ==
- Don River Basin
