= Khrushchevka =

Russian term for residential blocks built in the 1960s

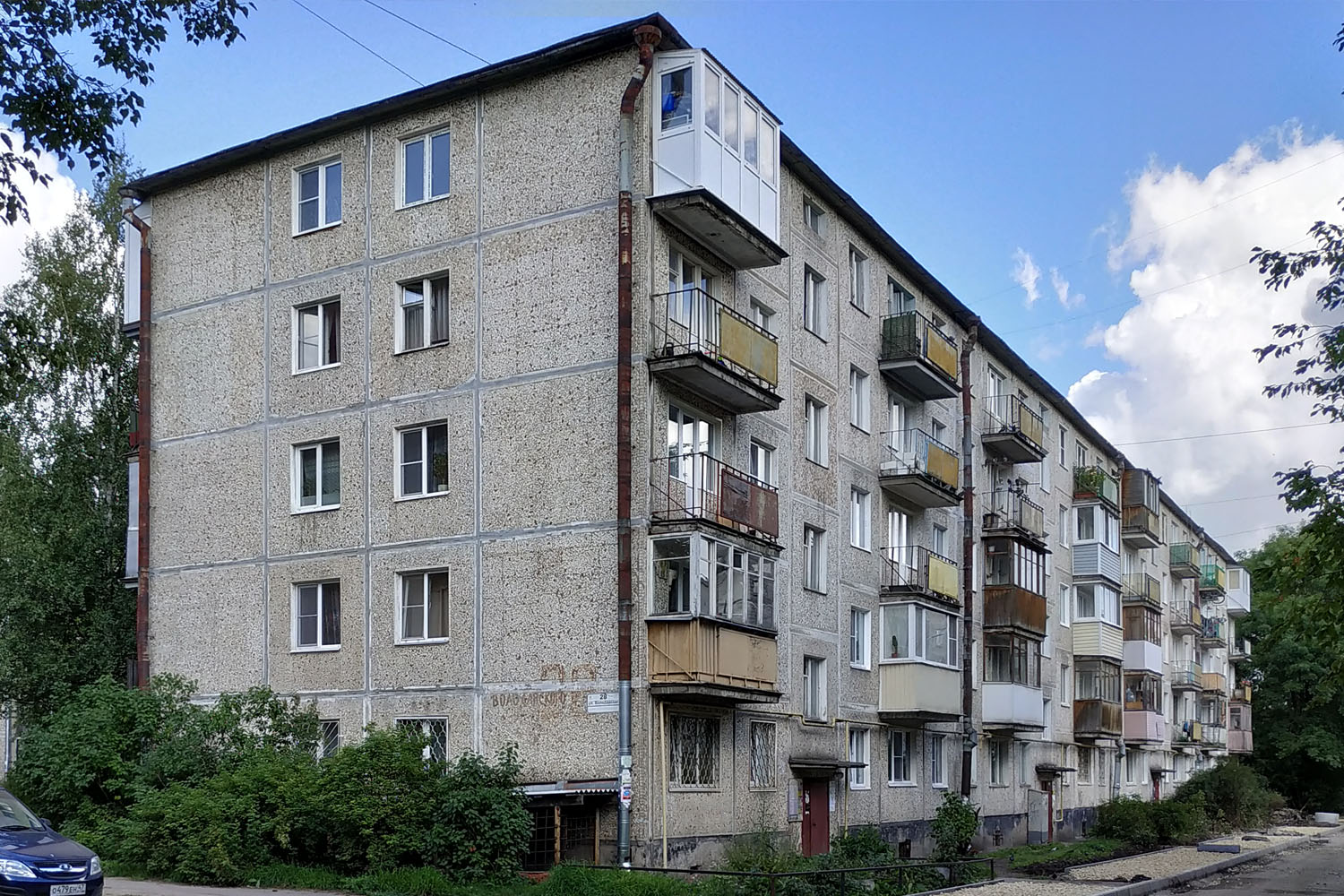
- 1-464 is one of the most common series of large-panel "Khrushchyovkas". In the photo, modification 1-464A built in 1965 in Gatchina

General information
- Architectural style: functionalism
- Location: USSR; Eastern Bloc (modifications of Soviet series)
- Construction started: 1956 in the Soviet Union
- Construction stopped: Mid-1970s

Technical details
- Floor count: usually 4–5, rarely 2–3, in Moscow there were 8–9-story buildings

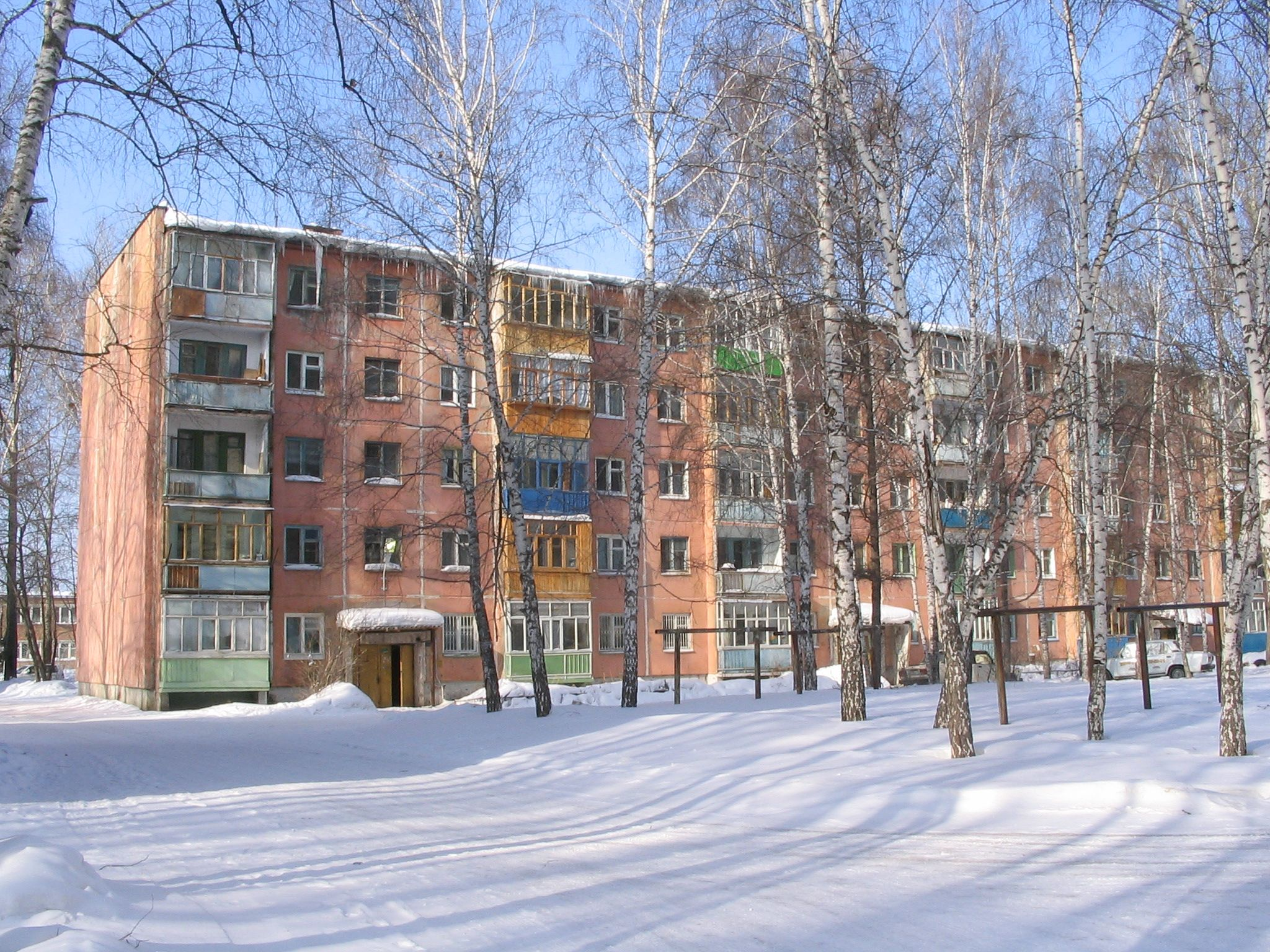
Panel khrushchevka in Tomsk

Khrushchevkas (/kru.ˈʃjɔːv.kə/, crew-sh-YAUV-kə; Russian: хрущёвка, romanized: khrushchyovka, IPA: [xrʊˈɕːɵfkə]) are a type of low-cost, concrete-paneled or brick three- to five-storied apartment buildings (and apartments in these buildings) which were designed and constructed in the Soviet Union from the early 1960s onwards, when their namesake, Nikita Khrushchev, was leader of the Soviet Union.

With the beginning of the construction of "Khrushchyovkas", Soviet housing development became predominantly industrial. Compared to "Stalinkas", which were usually built from brick, Khrushchyovkas had smaller apartments, and their functionalist-style architecture was extremely simple. However, the first-generation buildings surpassed the typical two-story wooden apartment buildings of the Stalin era in many ways and significantly alleviated the acute housing shortage. These buildings were constructed from 1956 to the mid-1970s.

An updated high-rise version, the brezhnevka, began to replace Khrushchyovkas, but both remain among the most widespread types of housing in the former Soviet Union and a symbol of the "Khrushchev Thaw" era. The Brezhnevkas were built in the 1970s and 1980s and included many upgrades including larger apartments (particularly, larger kitchens), elevators, and garbage disposals.

== History ==
=== Origins ===
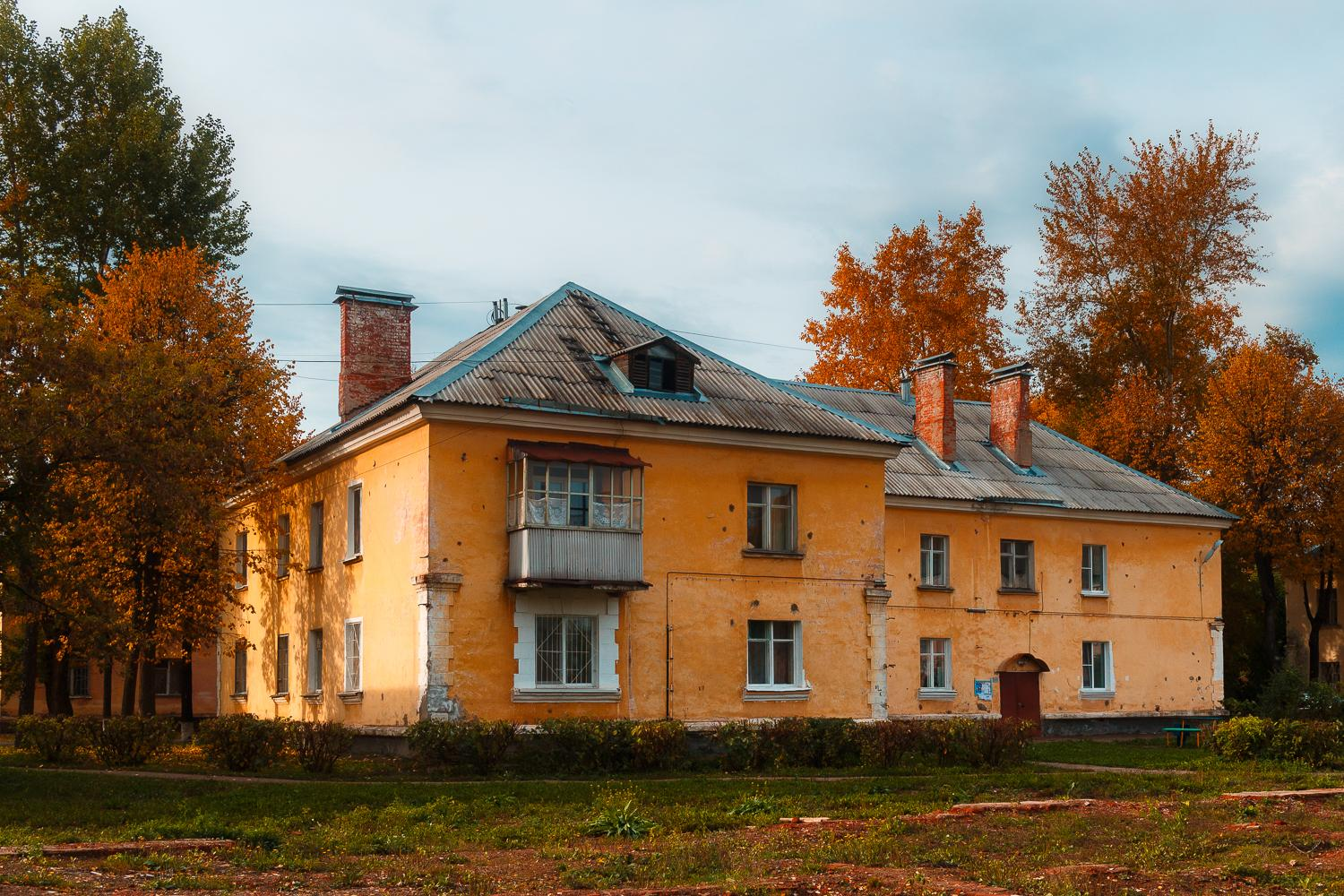
A typical masonry kommunalka

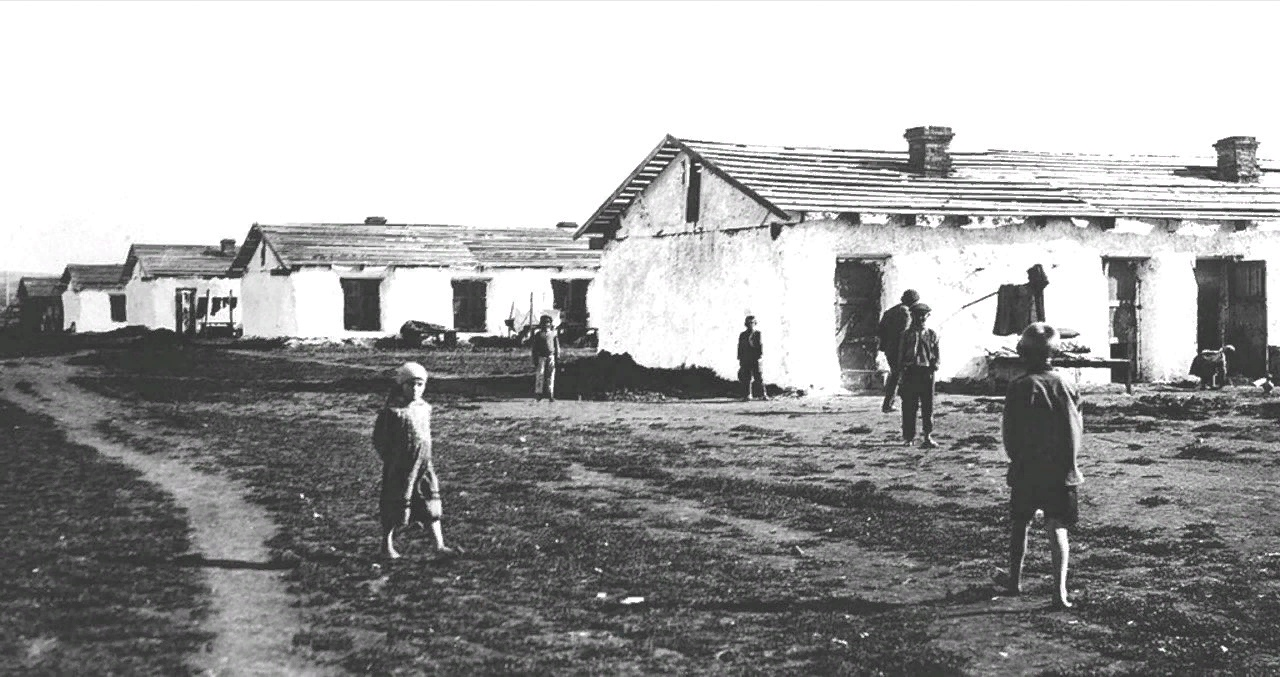
Residential workers' barracks

Traditional masonry is labor-intensive; individual projects were slow and not scalable to the needs of overcrowded cities. In the 1920s, a Soviet delegation studied Germany's social housing construction under Ernst May, using panels. Soviet building at the time lacked standardized sizes, clear work organization, and efficient task distribution, relying on semi-handcrafted methods that reduced cost-effectiveness.

In 1936, a decree from the Council of People's Commissars and the Communist Party Central Committee, "On Improving Construction and Reducing Costs," kick-started industrialization and standardization in Soviet building. Before the war, reinforced concrete steps and floor slabs appeared sporadically, large-block houses were built in major cities, and rapid assembly-line methods were tested on Moscow's Bolshaya Kaluzhskaya Street. However, creating full residential series wasn't a priority. Industrialization and standardization didn't yet mean simplifying facade designs. The 1940 "Openwork House" by Andrey Burov and Boris Blokhin showed that industrial construction could coexist with high-quality, varied architecture.

Post-war Western cities widely adopted large-panel housing for reconstruction. In the USSR, a standardized design approach—developing typical project series with uniform architectural styles—rolled out nationwide in the late 1940s, restoring prewar housing levels with low-rise brick houses and local materials.

Until the 1950s, Soviet construction featured small apartments with combined bathrooms, kitchen access through living rooms, secondary kitchen lighting, and lower ceilings. Room-by-room occupancy practices, however, kept these designs from spreading widely.

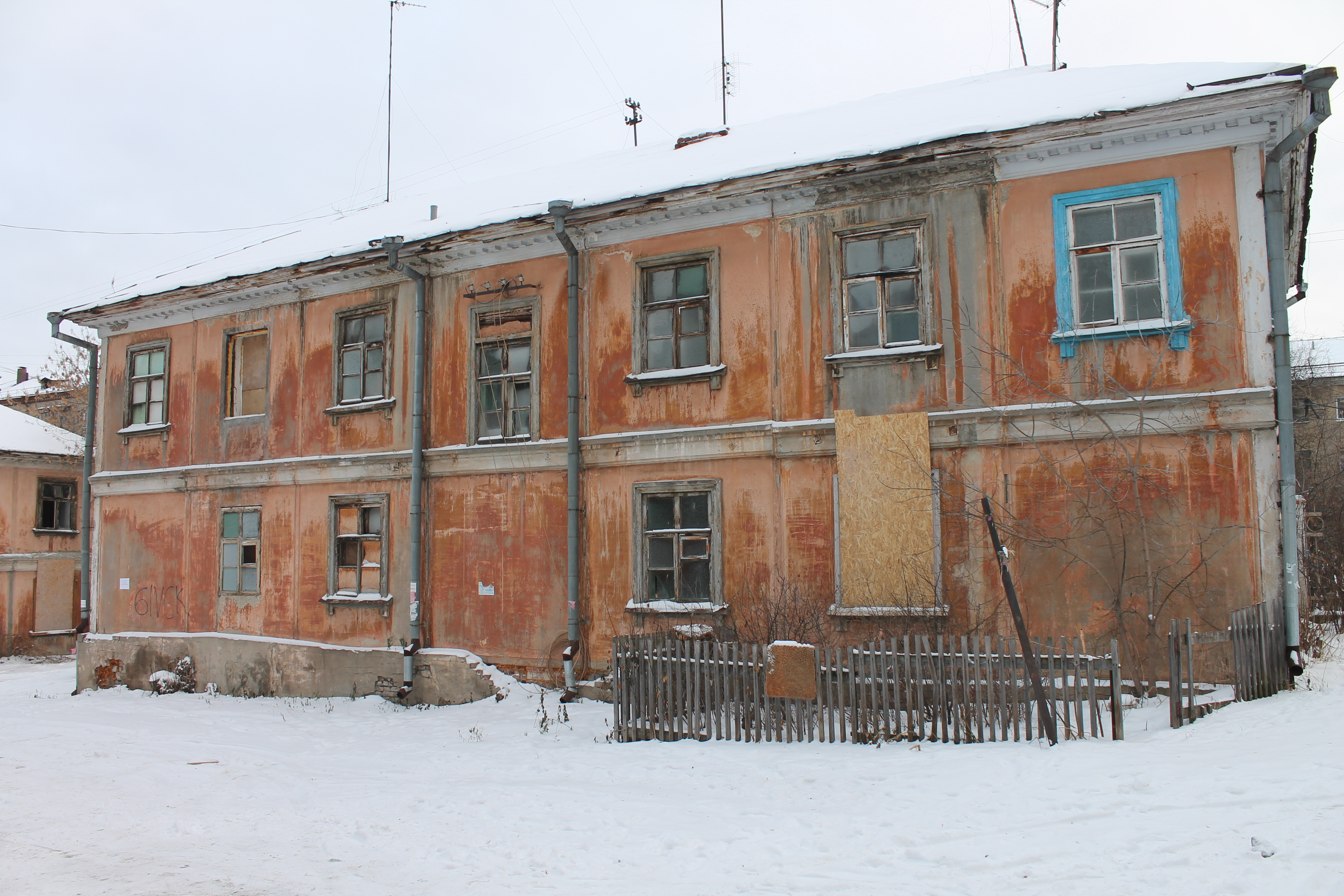
An abandoned large-panel house with an incomplete frame. The first large-panel houses of the USSR were built according to similar projects. Yekaterinburg. Built in 1949

=== The first Soviet large-panel houses ===
In 1931, under engineer A.S. Vatsenko, Kharkov began building a prototype panel house with thin reinforced concrete shells connected by perimeter ribs and filled with slag. In 1937, Uralmashzavod produced wall panel samples for an experimental house, but complex designs halted construction. Research on housing industrialization was led by Grigory Kuznetsov.

In 1945, a factory near Sverdlovsk (now Yekaterinburg) built one of the USSR's first large-panel houses in Beryozovsky, designed with 3×3 m panels. These one- and two-story homes were replicated across the region until 1951.

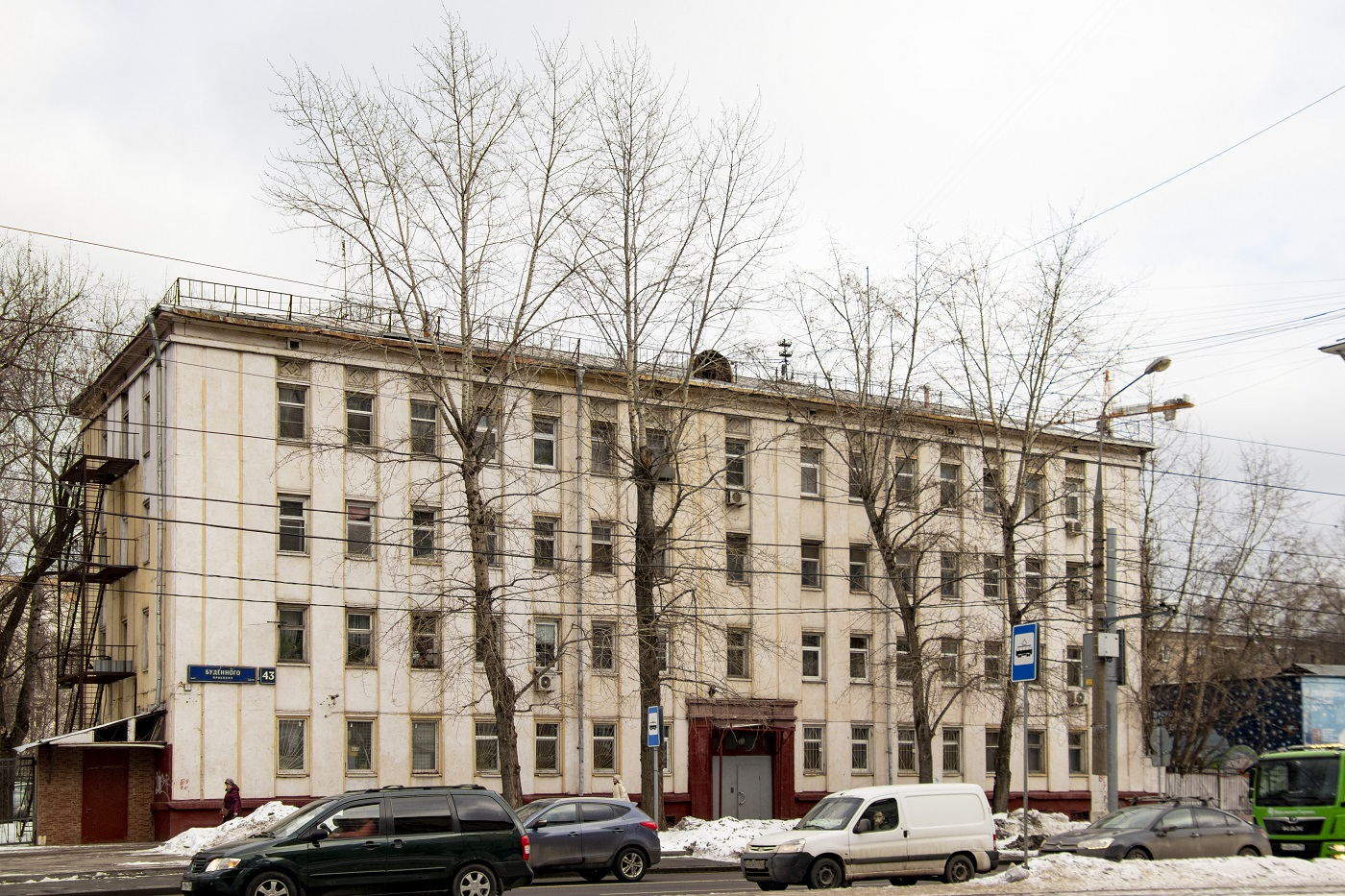
Frame-panel house in Moscow, Budyonny Avenue, 43. Built in 1948

Moscow introduced experimental frame-panel houses in 1948. A four-story corridor-style building on Budyonny Avenue was completed first, featuring a metal frame with precast reinforced concrete panels and floor slabs. Later, a full block of four- and five-story houses with metal and concrete frames was built on 1st Khoroshevsky Lane, adorned with garlands under windows and elements hiding panel joints. Precast staircases were used for the first time. Architect Mikhail Posokhin argued that new methods should enrich, not impoverish, architecture—despite on-site panel casting and joint sealing from scaffolding, these homes rose faster than brick ones.

In May 1949, at Khrushchev's initiative as Ukraine's Communist Party First Secretary, large-panel housing began in Ukraine. Houses in Makeevka and Kyiv used precast reinforced concrete frames and ceramic wall panels, showcasing diverse material use.

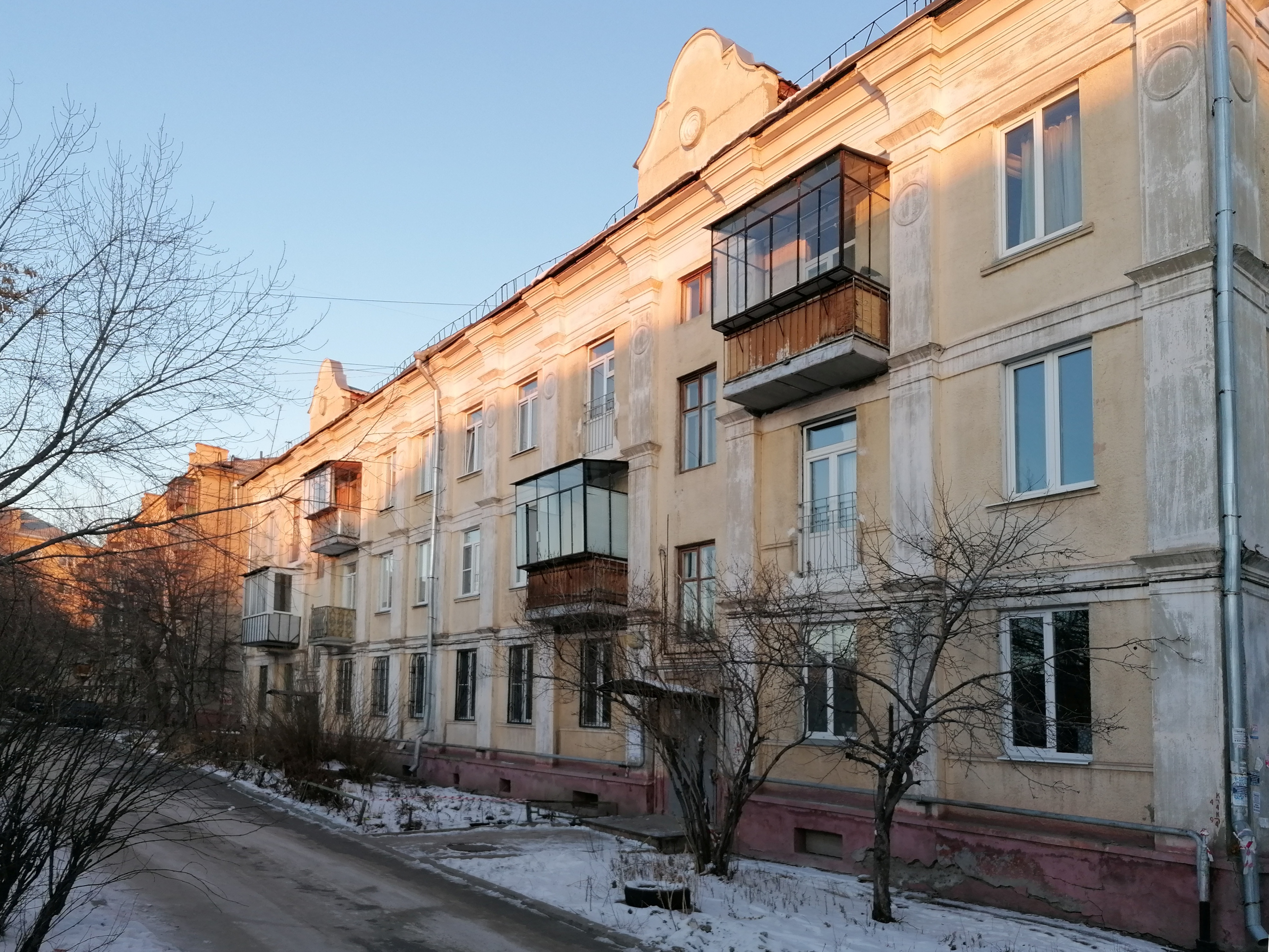
The first large-panel frameless house in the USSR in Magnitogorsk, Karl Marx Avenue, 32. Built in 1950

In 1950, a team from the USSR Academy of Architecture's Construction Technology Institute and Magnitostroy built the first frameless large-panel house in Magnitogorsk's 20A quarter. This three-story building featured 300 mm thick outer panels—two 40 mm layers with ribs and foam concrete infill—joints concealed by protrusions, and flat, solid floor slabs.

=== Preparing the reform ===
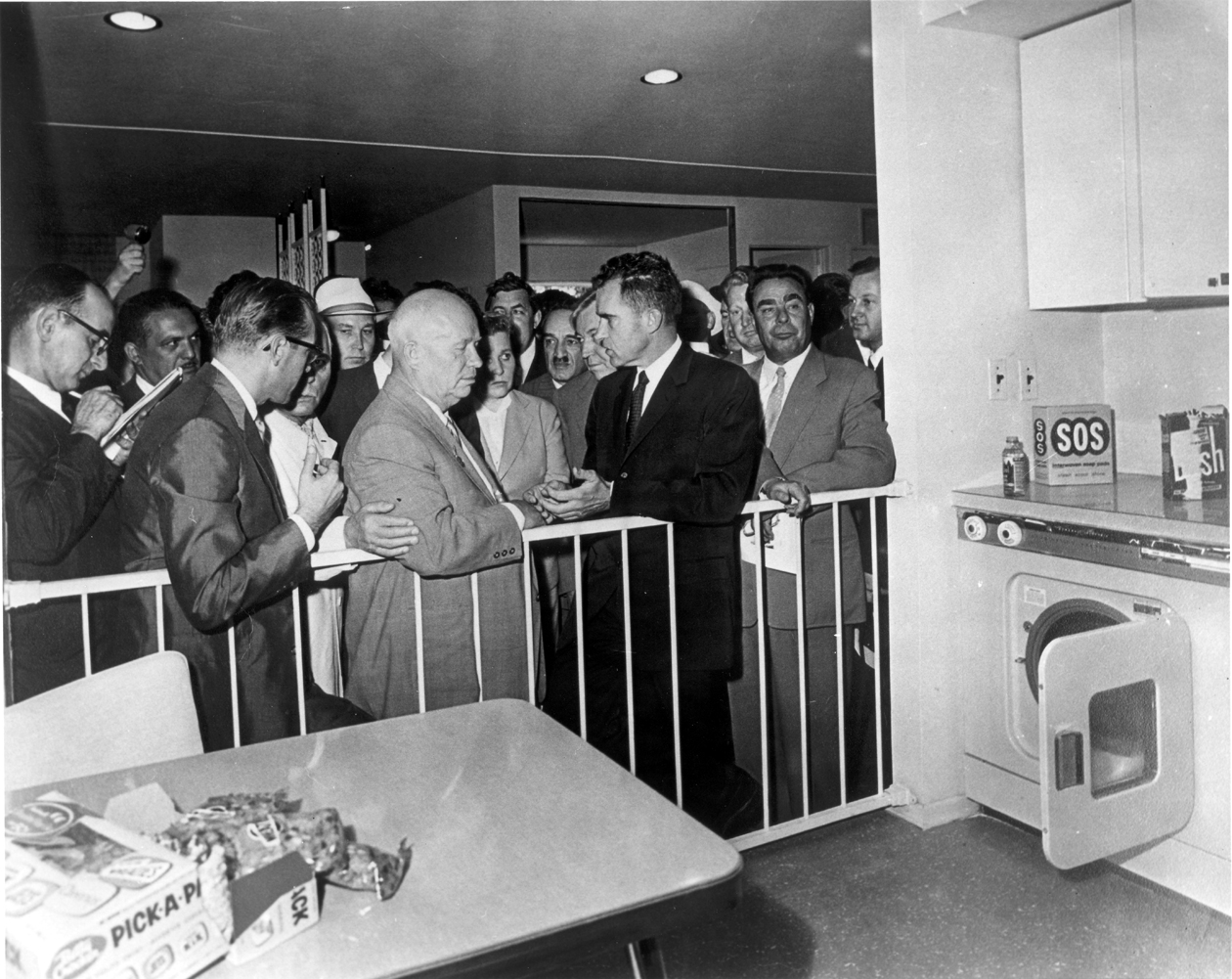
Khrushchev and Richard Nixon at the "kitchen debates" dedicated to the everyday life of Soviet and American citizens

The housing crisis stemmed from ongoing urbanization, aging urban housing stock, a lag in residential construction behind industrial growth due to rapid industrialization, and war devastation. Per the statistical report, urban housing in 1952 totaled 208.2 million m², up from 167 million m² prewar, but growth lagged behind population increases. On January 1, 1953, average living space per urban resident in public housing was 5.6 m²—6.0 m² in local council homes and 5.3 m² in ministry-owned homes. Including temporary and unregistered residents, space was even scarcer. In 1952, per-person living space barely exceeded 1940 levels and matched 1950. In cities like Kuibyshev, Molotov, Chelyabinsk, and Novosibirsk, it fell below 5 m². Khmelnitsky believes the report overstated per-person space. Unimproved barracks also made up a large share of urban housing—18 million m² in 1952, a 144% rise from 1940—while much permanent construction favored privileged groups.

=== Speech by Khrushchev at the All-Union Conference of Builders ===
On December 7, 1954, the final day of the "Second All-Union Conference of Builders, Architects, and Workers in Construction Materials, Machinery, Design, and Research," Nikita Khrushchev, First Secretary of the CPSU Central Committee, took the stage and delivered a surprising speech. He criticized Stalinist architecture, scolded its architects for extravagance and "excesses," and called for comprehensive construction industrialization. Khrushchev spoke with expertise, citing specifics: Stalinist high-rises lost significant space to complex structures and incurred high heating costs, while in the early 1930s, only 1% of design resources went to standardized blueprints. The speech, likely shaped by architect Georgiy Gradov's input, faced publication delays in Pravda, hinting at intraparty resistance to reform.

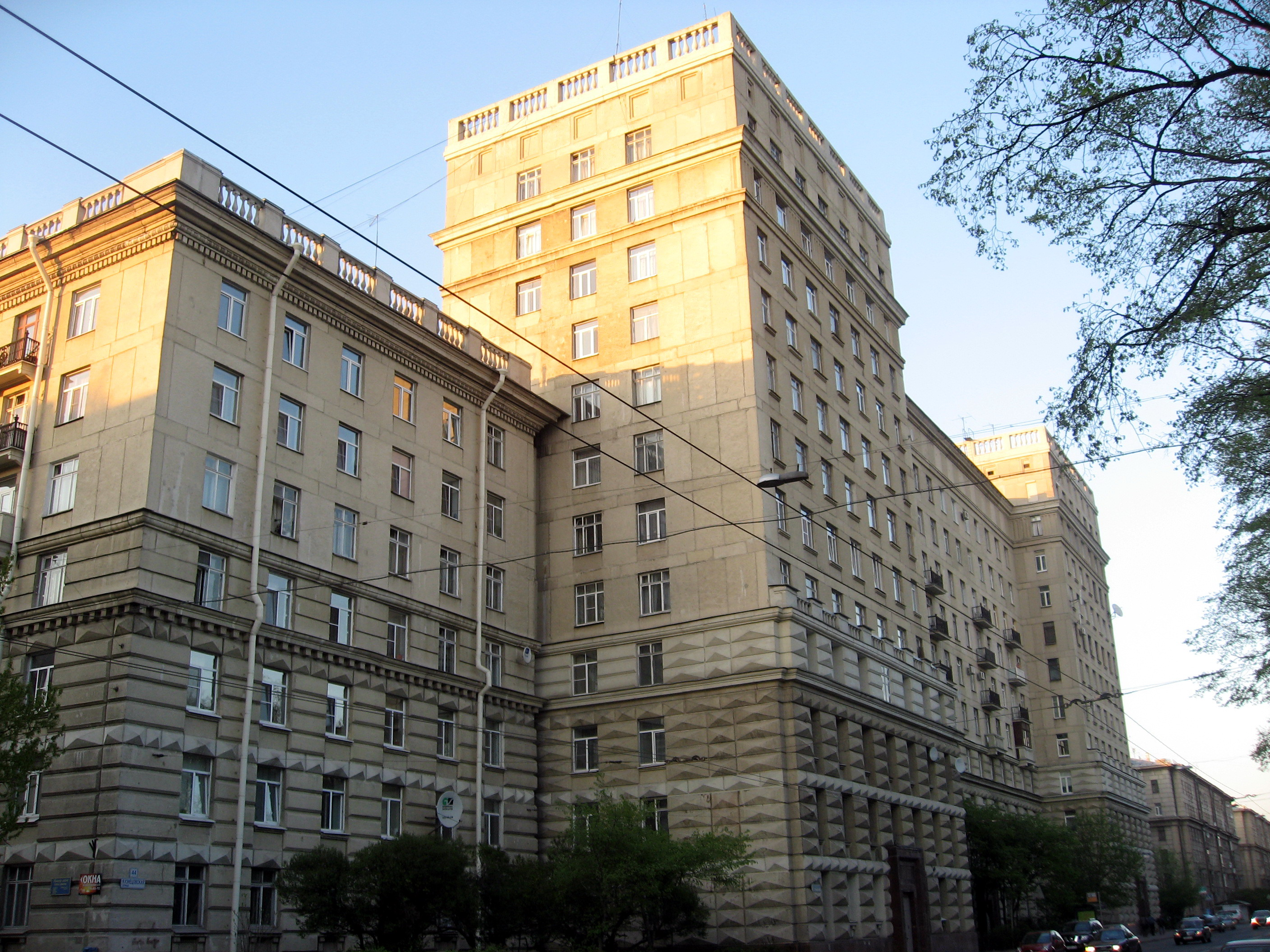
A Stalinka

Khrushchev's 1954 address was both a domestic move toward de-Stalinization and power consolidation and a foreign policy challenge to capitalist nations. Modern architectural studies view it as a key manifesto of architectural modernism.

=== Housing construction reform ===
In the mid-1950s, discontent with the delays in construction was growing in society. Messages to the II All-Union Congress of Soviet Architects were full of complaints about crumbling housing against the backdrop of the construction of luxury millionaire hotels.

On November 4, 1955, the Central Committee of the CPSU and the Council of Ministers of the USSR adopted a resolution "On the Elimination of Excesses in Design and Construction", which finally put an end to the period of Stalinist architecture. Having switched to a modernist language, Soviet architecture returned to the mainstream of world architecture. Housing construction began to be carried out almost entirely according to standard designs, with a gradually increasing share of industrially manufactured elements]. The resolution of the Central Committee of the CPSU and the Council of Ministers of the USSR "On the Development of the Production of Precast Concrete Structures and Components for Construction" issued a year earlier planned the construction of 400 precast concrete plants.

Khrushchev-era buildings contrast with the monumental and heavy Stalinist architecture by the absence of fine-grained decoration and thinning, lightweight structures. "Khrushchev-era buildings" were superior in quality of construction to the multi-apartment wooden two-story buildings of typical series that were built en masse in the previous period. In theory and practice, a utilitarian approach to architecture prevailed. The problem of artistic image faded into the background and was solved by simple compositional techniques. The most important element of spatial composition was a group of buildings. The historian of Soviet architecture Selim Omarovich Khan-Magomedov recalled that the architectural community recognized the need to make houses cheaper and develop large-panel construction, but the General Secretary's intervention in matters of style caused discontent.

And it seemed that artistic image was leaving architecture altogether. Theorist Georgy Minervin came to the aid of architects. He believed that individual standard residential buildings ("boxes") could only have an artistic appearance, but when united into complexes (blocks) they could create a common, so to speak, collective, artistic image. Many people were satisfied with this at the time.

There was an idea that each individual plant should produce one type of panel, but this type was unique. But this method was abandoned, all the first generation houses were similar to each other. When asked why this happened, architect N. P. Kraynyaya answered:

We were carried away by the very novelty of the task, we believed that the reflection in architecture of the same comfort of housing for everyone was the new aesthetics.

According to the designers' recollections, the construction of "five-story buildings" was perceived as one of the symbols of the democratization of society: "construction for a person who was remembered amidst serious state affairs and concerns".

Savings were achieved through the rationalization of living space and the standardization of solutions. All standards for the dimensions and area of premises were reduced. In an advertisement for new buildings, the announcer reported: to cook borscht in an old apartment, you need to walk 500 steps, but in a new small kitchen of 5.6 m², everything is close by, you can literally reach anything with your hand. In turn, the small size of the apartments forced the industry to produce furniture of smaller dimensions. Thus, with standardized construction, a special aesthetic of small, compact things appeared. Standardization extended to furniture and even to people's daily routines. As a result, the costs of building "Khrushchev-era" buildings, compared to Stalin's time, were reduced by 30% or more.

The urban planning thinking changed completely. Mathematics and statistics helped to carefully calculate the life of society in new microdistricts, determine people's needs, and calculate optimal routes to workplaces, schools, and clinics. The egalitarian thinking of the Thaw era brought social meaning to construction: the closed neighborhoods built up with richly decorated Stalinist houses for the elite of society were to be replaced by an open, comfortable, universal living environment for the entire population.

As a result of the reform, the role of urban planners and engineers increased, and the architects faded into the background. In his speech at the Third Conference on Construction in 1958, Khrushchev drew attention to the "relapses of archaism and embellishment" in the projects:

Perestroika in architecture is not yet complete. Many people misunderstand the tasks and view it only as a reduction in architectural excesses. The point is a fundamental change in the direction of architecture, and this must be completed.

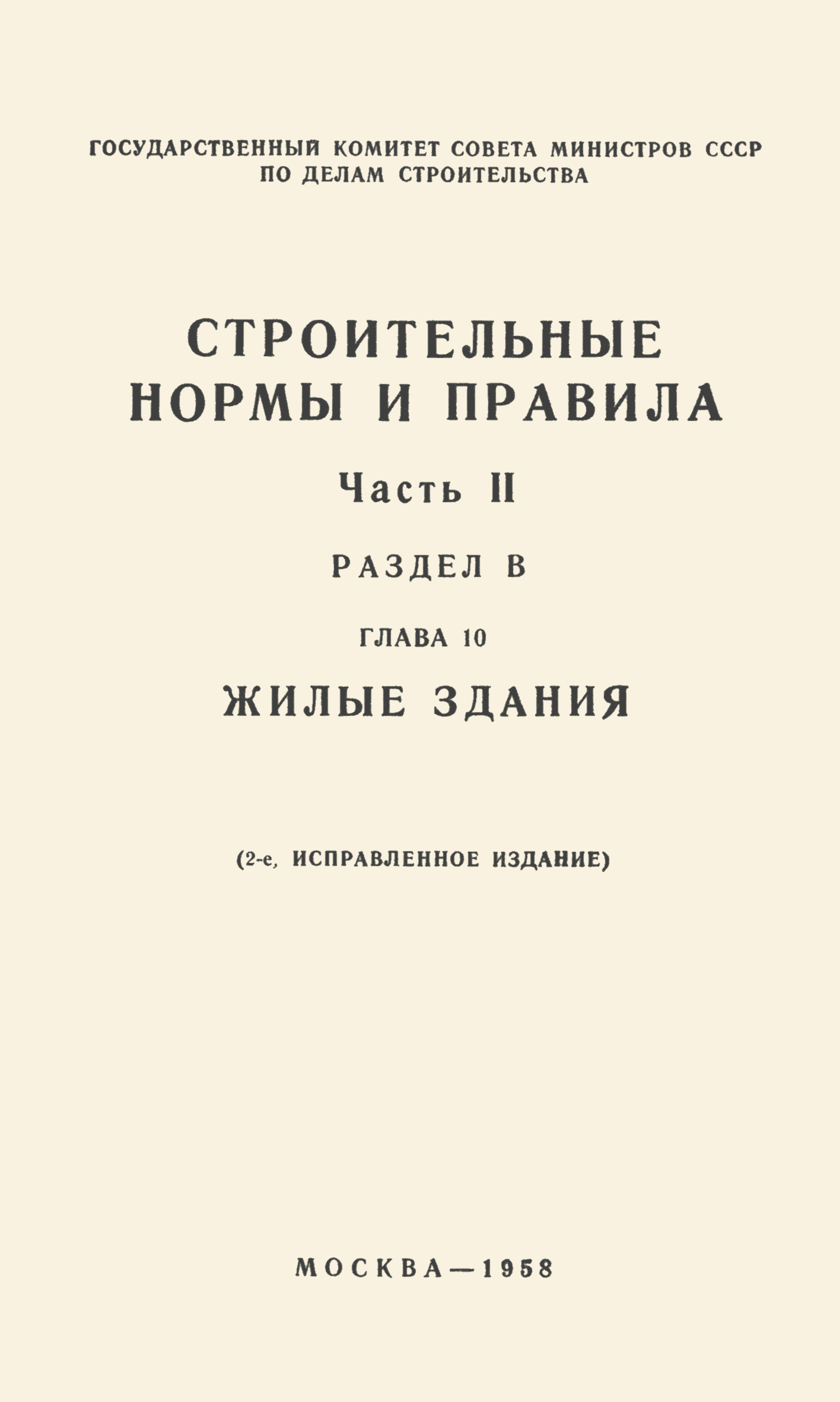
SNiP II-B.10-5V "Residential buildings"

The 20th Congress of the CPSU in 1956 set the task of putting an end to the housing deficit within 20 years. On July 31, 1957, the Central Committee of the CPSU and the Council of Ministers of the USSR adopted a resolution "On the Development of Housing Construction in the USSR". It was of great importance, as it finally consolidated the new principles of construction and architecture that had been formed by that time. A year later, they were reflected in the new edition of SNiP II-B.10-58 "Residential Buildings". It was with the 1957 decree and the new edition of SNiP that the period of truly mass housing construction began throughout the USSR. It was planned to build 650-660 million m² of total area (15 million apartments) by 1965 through state construction alone.

== Mass production ==
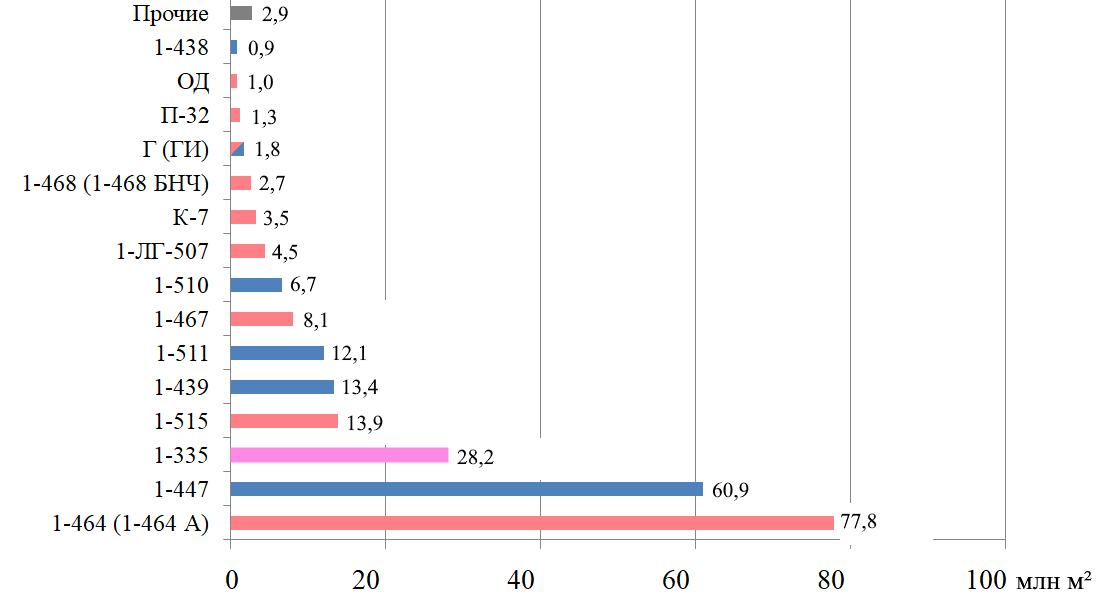
The total area of 4- and 5-storey buildings of the first mass series in Russia. Total — 229.7 million m². Data from 2008

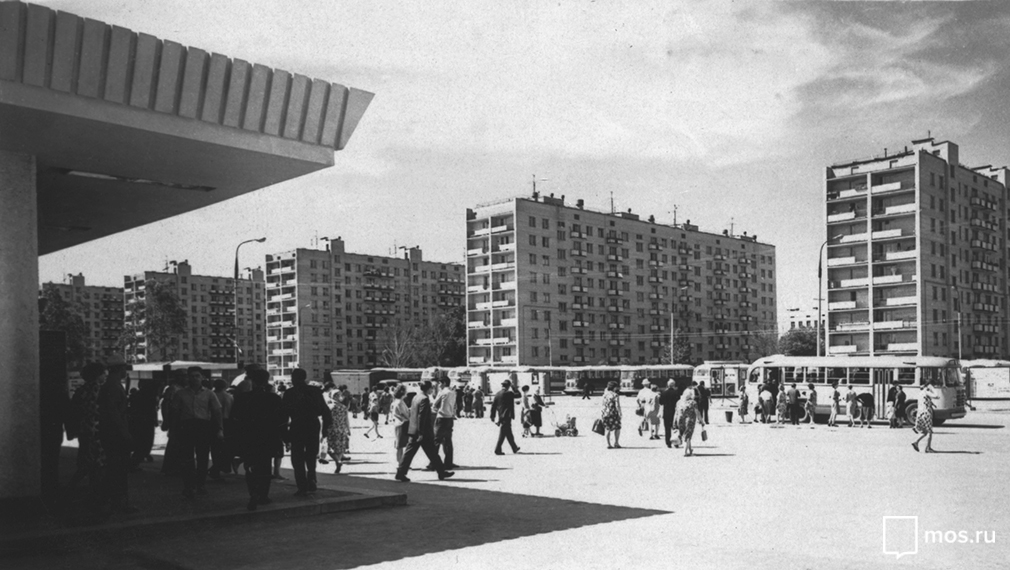
Development of Festivalnaya Street in Moscow. Houses of the II-29 series

In July 1958, the USSR Council of Ministers issued a decree "On the expansion of the use of standard designs in construction," which set the task of reducing the diversity of standard designs to a minimum. In 1959, the text of the seven-year plan approved precast concrete as the basis for industrial construction. Within a few years, most of the country's house-building plants (DSKs or "ДСК") were built.

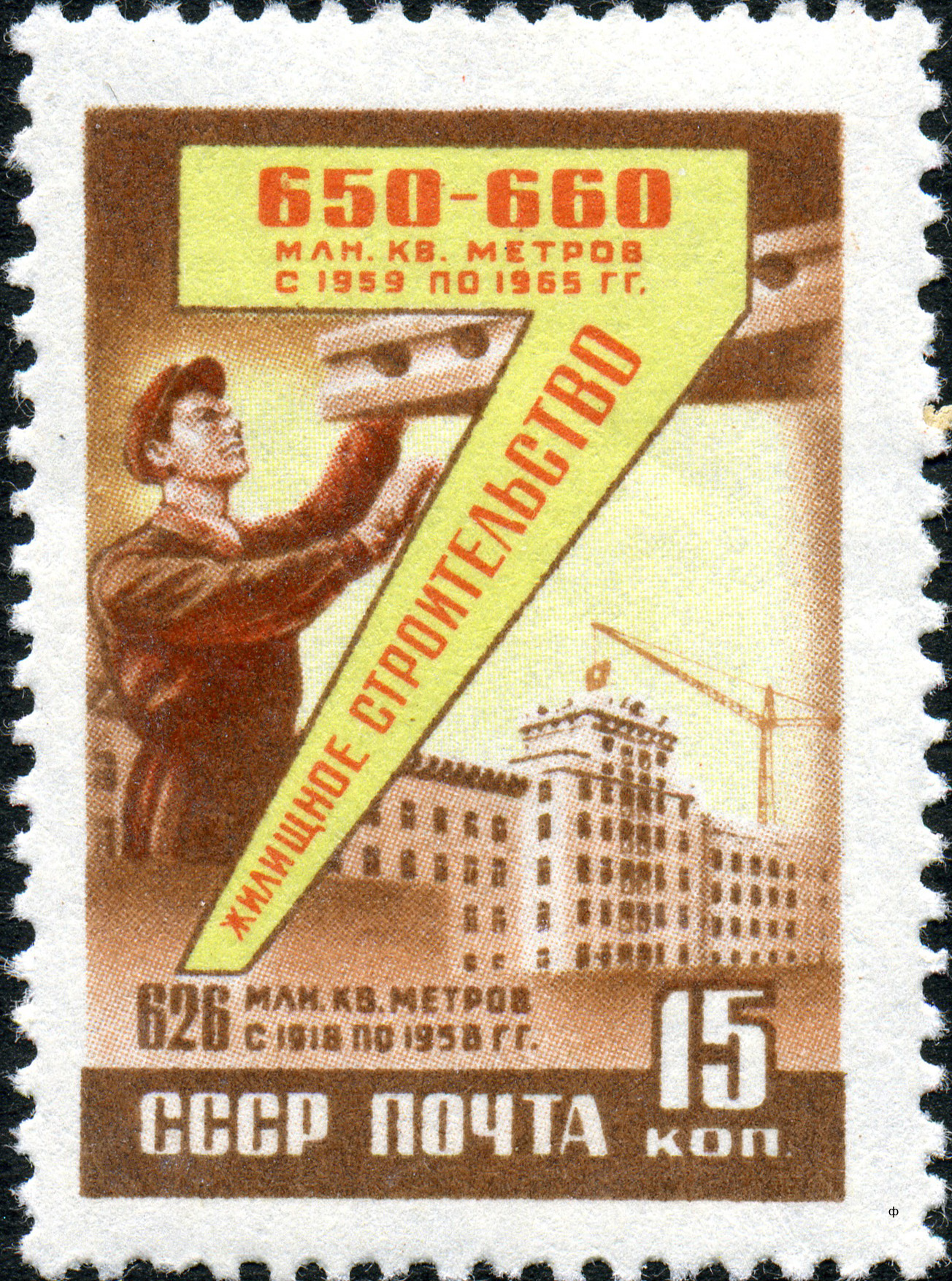
USSR postage stamp dedicated to the seven-year plan

It was impossible to completely abandon brick at this stage. Even in Moscow and Leningrad, entire microdistricts were built from brick houses of the capital series. In the rest of the country, the 1-447 series (and modifications 1-447S, adapted to SNiP II-V.10-58) became the monopolist of brick housing construction. In the 1960s, this was the most widespread series in Soviet housing construction. Relatively good thermal insulation, the ability to carry out redevelopment, pitched roofs of a successful design - these features made 1-447 one of the best series. But mass use was sometimes carried out without taking into account local features. This became the cause of the disaster in Neftegorsk, when as a result of an earthquake, houses that were not adapted to seismically dangerous areas crumbled.

The peak of housing construction occurred in 1960. At that time, 82.8 million m² of living space was commissioned, compared to 41 million m² in 1956. Although a significant share was made up of brick houses of the 1-447 series (even in cities, the share of large-panel construction did not exceed 25% in 1963), the percentage of large-panel housing construction grew every year. The construction of a square meter of large-panel "Khrushchevkas" cost 103-110 rubles, large-block ones - 115 rubles, brick ones - 122-130 rubles. In 1963, there were about 200 DSKs in the country. But Khrushchev demanded higher indicators. Assembly teams began to compete in the speed of construction of structures. For example, in Leningrad, a house was assembled in 5 days. In search of even cheaper solutions, architects and designers proposed using unusual materials. Under the leadership of B. M. Iofan, a house was designed using plastics in enclosing structures.

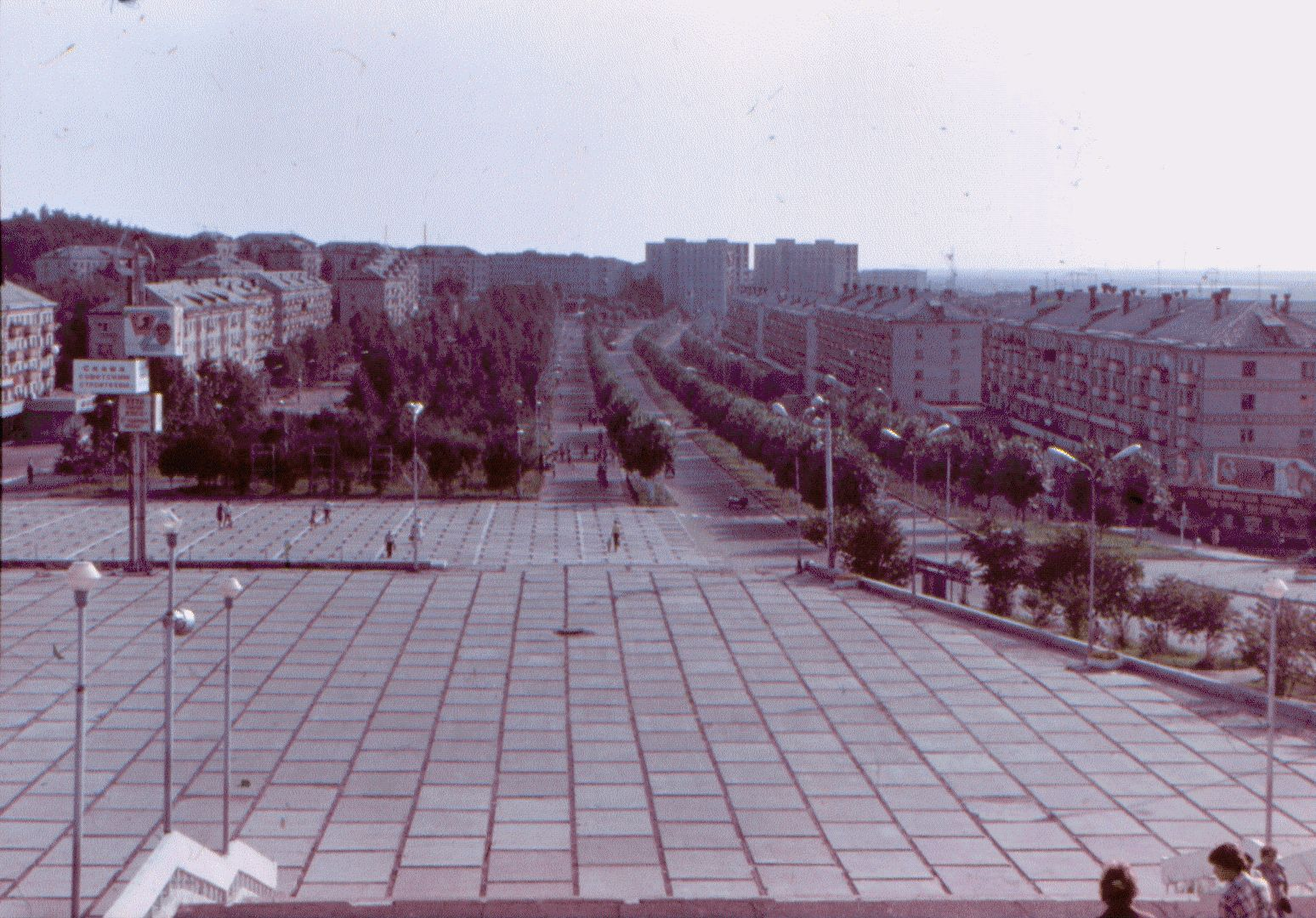
Soviet brick buildings in Amursk

Large-panel technology was exported to the countries of the Second World. With minor changes, Soviet series were built in Vietnam, China, and Cuba.

== Usage experience ==
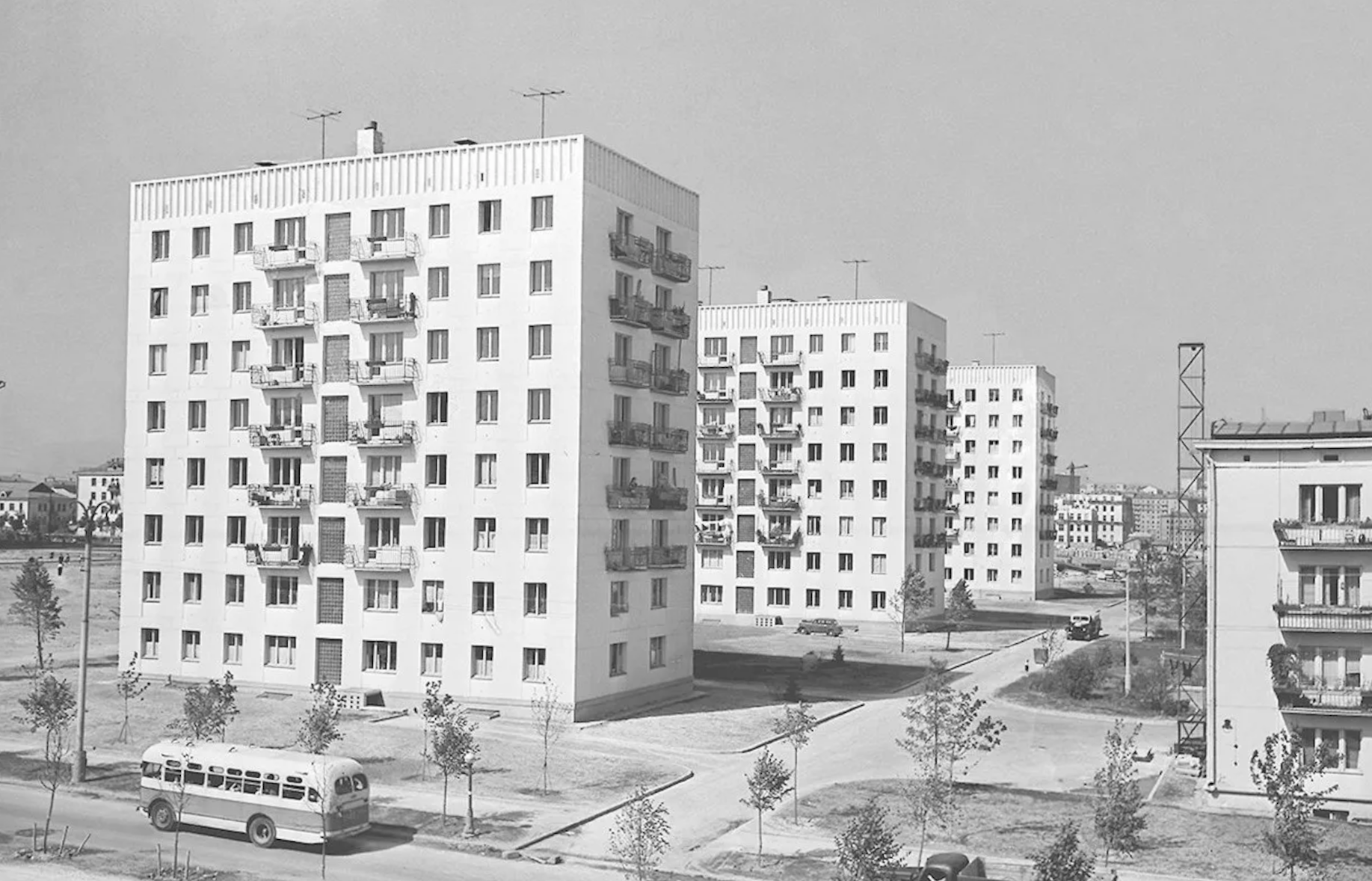
Houses of different heights in Novye Cheryomushki, Moscow, 1958

According to Soviet everyday life researcher Natalia Lebina, society at the beginning of Khrushchev's reforms experienced a state of euphoria linked to changes in spatial everyday life. Soviet art sincerely praised housing construction, but alongside admiration, criticism also emerged. In 1959, Ernst May visited the USSR—he had been involved in large-scale planning of Soviet socialist cities in the early 1930s. He described Khrushchev's construction as a massive building program driven by "revolutionary measures" but noted the hopeless monotony of new districts and the lack of attempts to enliven them, even with color. There was insufficient consideration of natural and climatic conditions, with housing series being built in unsuitable regions. In professional circles, concerns arose about the traumatic impact of modernist transformations on historical urban environments. In mass culture, the first large-scale housing series became the subject of jokes.

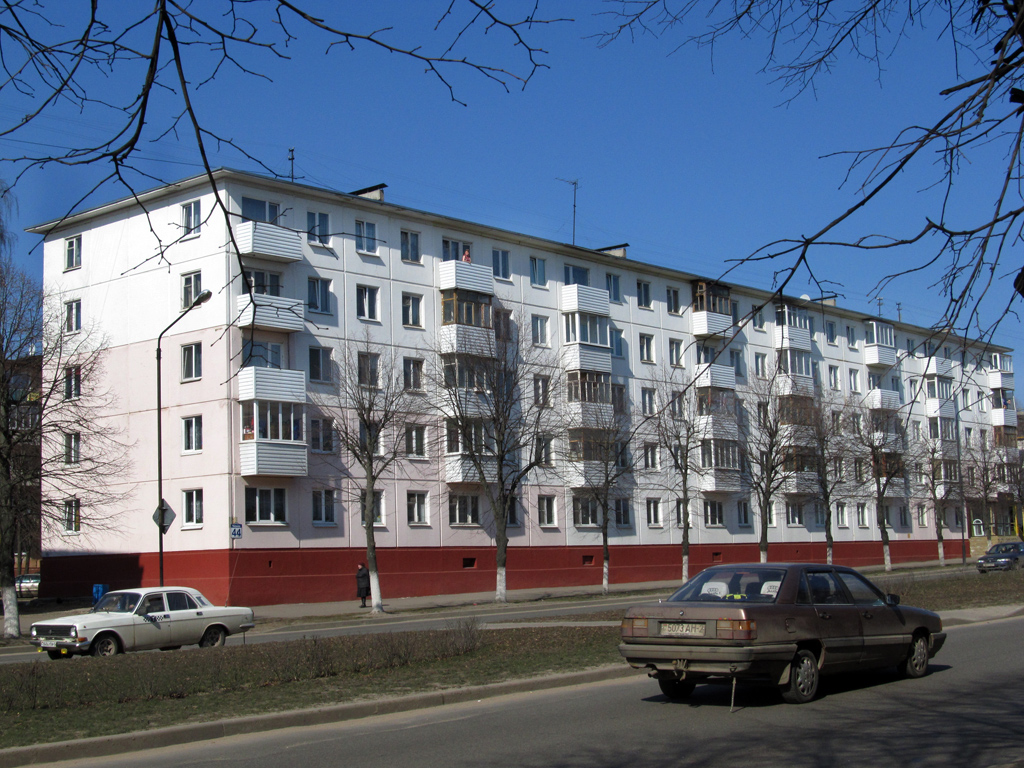
1-335 with uniform balcony railings in Borisov, Belarus

While Architecture of the USSR magazine accompanied one exhibition with quantitative construction figures, visitors left contradictory feedback in the guestbook, complaining about difficulties in furnishing new apartments. A collective letter to the Union of Architects' congress in 1961 expressed concern that excessively small apartments would create excessive demand for more comfortable housing in the future. New residents criticized the layout, including pass-through living rooms that had to double as bedrooms, combined bathrooms, cramped entryways that made moving furniture difficult, and other issues.

The projects included a limited range of apartment layouts. The living space in one-, two-, and three-room apartments varied by only 12–13 m², leading to uneven distribution of living space per person. The needs of large families and single individuals were not considered. Corridor-type dormitory buildings with shared kitchens existed but were rarely built.

== Transition to the second generation of housing ==
After 1963, second-generation housing series began to emerge. These were not only more comfortable but also allowed for more flexible and diverse microdistrict layouts. Initially, the first mass housing series were expected to remain in use for only five years. However, the transition to second-generation series was significantly delayed, as it required re-equipping prefabricated housing factories. In 1969, the Central Committee of the Communist Party and the Council of Ministers issued a decree, "On Measures to Improve the Quality of Residential and Civil Construction," after which the construction of the first mass housing series began to be phased out. In Moscow, these buildings were constructed until 1972, while in the regions, they continued into the late 1970s.

== Statistics and rating ==
The Soviet Union became the world leader in construction speed after 1956, with one in four families receiving a new apartment. Newspapers reported that from 1956 to 1963, the national housing stock nearly doubled—from 640,000 to 1,184 million square meters—meaning more housing was built in this period than in the previous 40 years. Moscow's housing stock increased by 36 million square meters from 1954 to 1963. The cost per square meter decreased by 6%, while the overall cost of an apartment dropped by 35–40%. When families moved into the first mass-produced housing series, 95% received separate apartments, compared to only 36% in older buildings. However, the living space per person remained nearly unchanged at 6.5–7 square meters in the early 1960s.

New housing dramatically transformed the communal lifestyle of the Stalin era. Millions of families moved not just into new apartments but out of overcrowded communal flats, barracks, basements, and dugouts into individual housing with modern amenities. This shift created new societal expectations for living conditions. However, the housing crisis was never fully resolved, neither by Khrushchev nor his successors.

Pritzker Prize-winning architect Oscar Niemeyer recognized the social significance of this mass construction:

You solved an enormous social problem with these buildings. When I built Brasília, I dreamed of moving people from the favelas into proper housing. You accomplished this, while we did not. Yes, I built a beautiful city, but only for the elite—the favelas remained.

Another Pritzker-winning architect, Rem Koolhaas, admired Khrushchev's achievements:

Today, it's hard to find a housing project where simplicity, affordability, and large courtyards coexist. That's why I admire Khrushchev and the speed at which everything was built. I have no issue with repetition as an architectural method ... Berlin made a mistake when, after reunification, it demolished everything that was part of the communist aesthetic. I hope Moscow doesn't make the same mistake.

Urban historian Kuba Snopek views Khrushchev-era housing as a cohesive architectural entity, noting its affordability, human-scale design (better than districts where massive 15-story "closets" surround enormous courtyards), and abundant greenery ("a riot of plants, even though it's not a park").

Architectural historian Dmitry Khmelnitsky summarized:

The government's push for mass industrial apartment construction forced a radical shift in urban planning, architectural education, and design institutions. This was an entirely new, Khrushchev-Brezhnev-era city, based on standardized urban planning, prefabricated housing, and uniform apartments for the working class. Unlike Stalin's city, which had a grand central district for the elite and barracks for workers, Khrushchev's vision reintroduced a social purpose to architecture—making mass apartment housing the backbone of the city. It was a revolutionary shift in both the mindset of Soviet leaders and the approach of Soviet architects.

...

Western architectural journals began entering the USSR, and translated books were published, quickly revitalizing architectural education.

...

But practical implementation was far less successful. While Khrushchev abandoned Stalinist ornamentation, he left intact the rigid bureaucratic system of design, which stifled individual creativity.

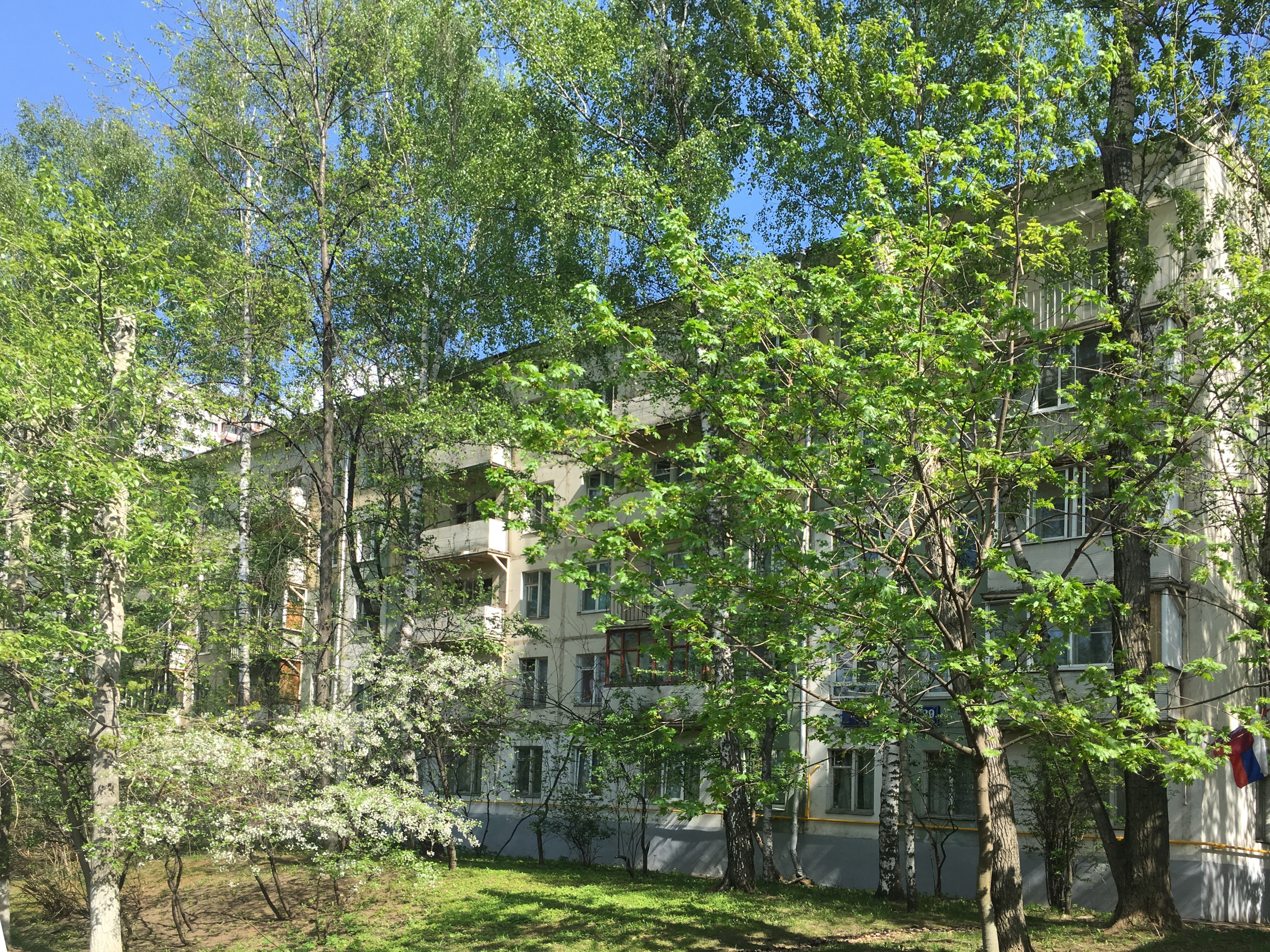
Green area in front of house 1-515/5

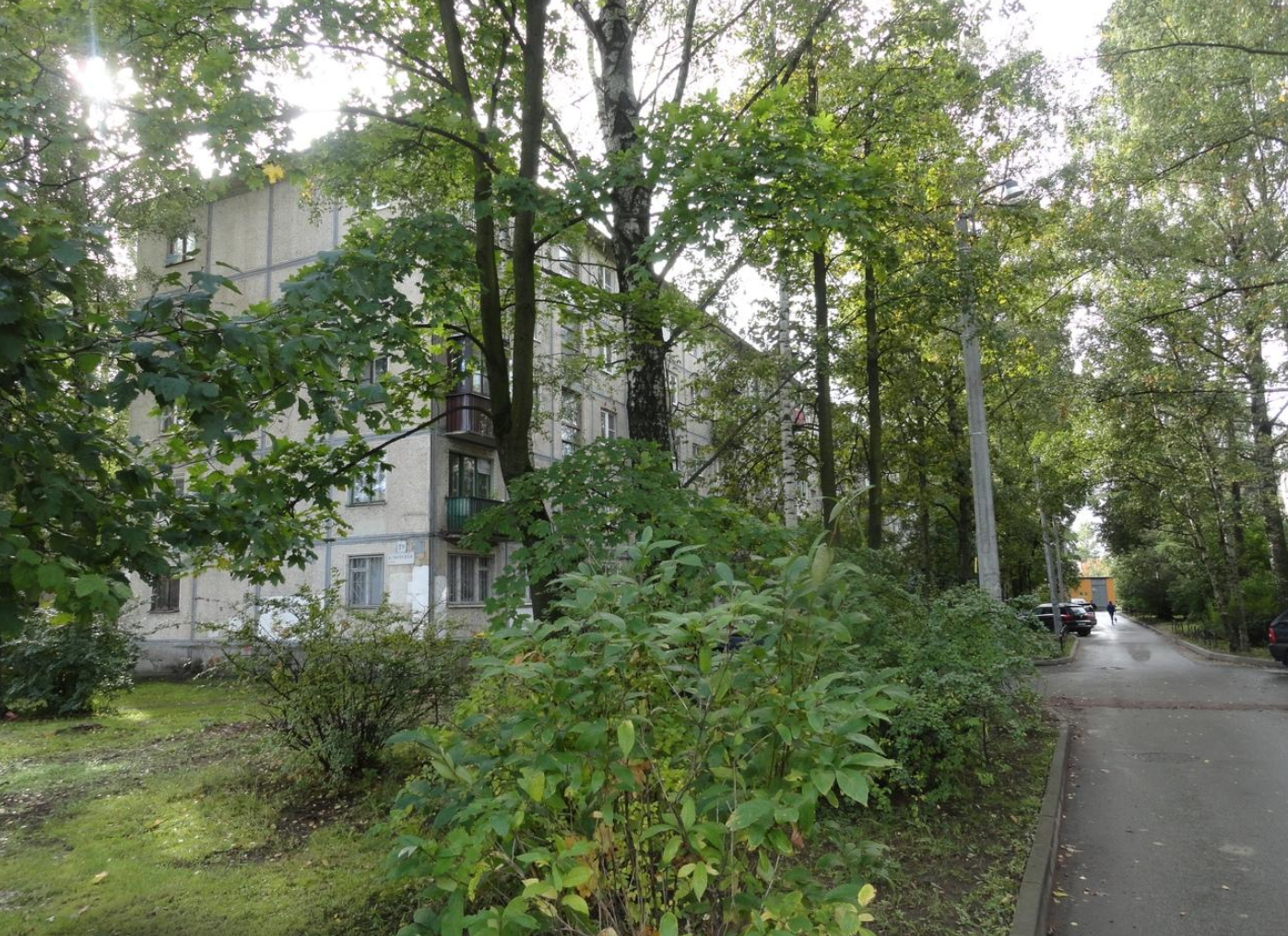
Intra-block passage of house 1-335

Urbanist Vladimir Stadnikov noted that Khrushchev-era housing set the stage for the depressing high-rise districts that became common in Russia:

On one hand, the program was highly successful—never before in our country's history had so many people moved into private housing in such a short time (20–30 years). But it also had disastrous consequences for urban environments and social well-being.

Stalin's former minister Vyacheslav Molotov dismissed Khrushchev's housing efforts as populist pandering:

They built houses with low ceilings, copying capitalist designs where the goal is to cram in as many workers as possible!

Soviet daily life researcher Natalia Lebina, who wrote a book on first-generation Khrushchev-era housing, noted that these buildings are widely seen as dull and inconvenient. In collective memory, they are almost exclusively associated with the term "Khrushchyovka," often used pejoratively. The word emerged in Soviet times alongside "Khrushchoba" (a blend of "Khrushchev" and "slum"). These terms appeared in press and literature from the late 1980s and entered dictionaries as colloquial terms in the 1990s. The phrase "first mass series" is also used.

== Structure and architecture ==
=== Volumetric planning ===
First-generation houses were characterized by extremely simple volumetric and planning designs. Most often, they were four-section, five-story rectangular "boxes", with the only protruding facade elements being balconies, entrance groups, and cornices. There were houses with varying numbers of sections and heights ranging from 2 to 9 stories. In rural areas, two-story houses were built. In Riga, Tallinn, and several Ukrainian cities, two- and three-section houses were constructed. These houses rarely included built-in public spaces.

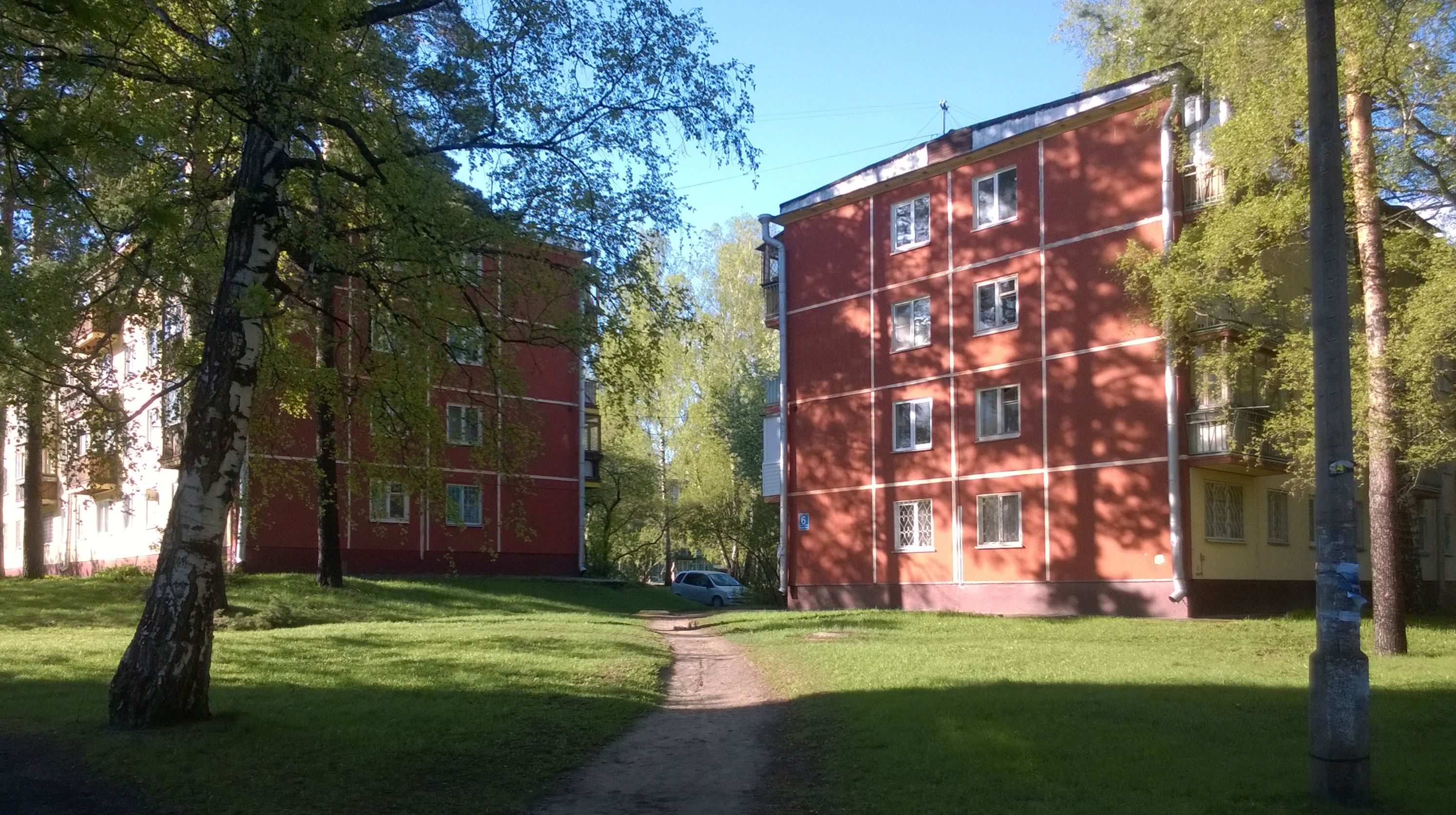
4-storey buildings in Novosibirsk Akademgorodok

The layout hinges on a central staircase, typically two-flight, with one flight to the raised first floor, allowing basement vents above ground. In southern regions, staircases may have three flights or be external. Each floor groups two to four apartments (usually four) around the staircase, with direct door access. Wet areas connect to a shared sewer stack. Apartments include living rooms, a kitchen, an entryway, a bathroom, built-in storage, and a balcony or loggia—all naturally lit. Some designs feature a transom window between bathroom and kitchen. Utility space spans 12-13 m².

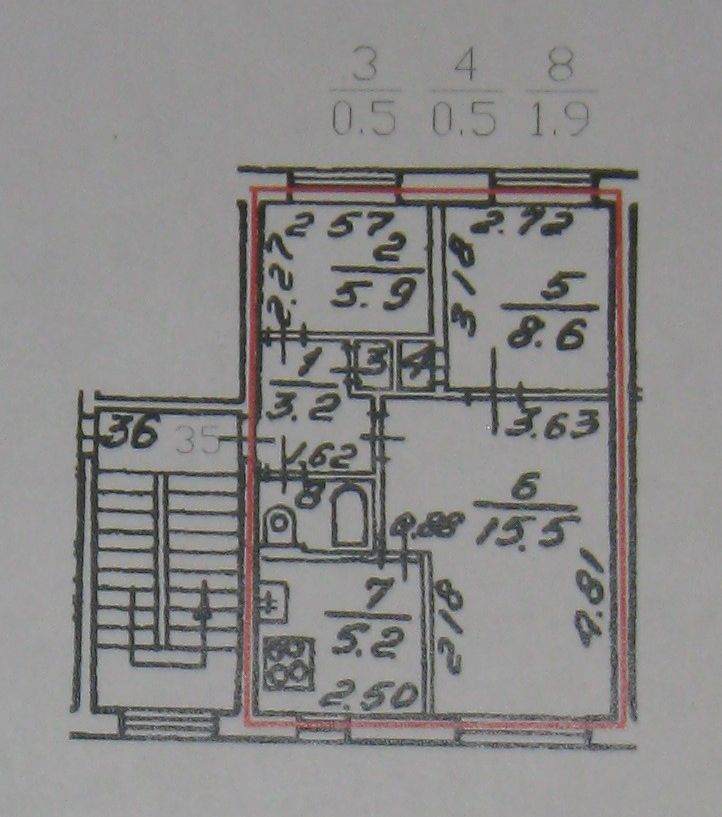
3-room apartment of the Г series

Early designs feature a common room linking to the bedroom, a bathroom off the entryway, and a kitchen accessed via an alcove—a space-saving "Vesnin technique" from the 1940s that let the cook monitor the common room. Kitchens range from 4.6-7.9 m², influenced by constructivism, European trends, and the rise of dining out and packaged foods, offering more space per person than Stalin-era communal flats. Refrigerators spread, and some brick designs included cold wall cabinets.

Bathrooms were separate (toilet and sink/vanity rooms) or combined (all-in-one), with small-family units having a toilet and shower, accessed from the entryway. Bathtubs measured 150×75 cm or 120×70 cm, or sitz baths were used. In hot climates, larger balconies or loggias were added.

Bedrooms span 8-13 m², with 6 m² rooms in larger apartments used as nurseries. Private bedrooms, unlike communal flats, enhanced privacy for sleep, intimacy, and self-care, fitted with compact beds, sofa beds, and vanities. The common room, often a pass-through to the kitchen and bedroom, served as a multi-purpose living, dining, and sleeping space. Apartments were assigned by the formula (rooms = residents minus one). With few leisure options in new districts, residents hosted guests in these versatile rooms.

Some designs feature four apartments per section with passthrough common rooms to the bedroom and kitchen, though later modifications added separate kitchen access. Ceiling heights were at least 2.5 m, matching French, Swedish, and Finnish standards, lower than Stalin-era housing but adequate for air circulation in family units.

=== Materials and design ===
The 1956 design (series no. 1) relied on a structural system with three longitudinal load-bearing panel walls, but by the next year, new approaches emerged. Early housing development focused on finding the optimal structure. A key system was large-panel construction, featuring variations like three longitudinal load-bearing walls, two longitudinal walls with an internal frame, a full frame, combined longitudinal and transverse load-bearing walls, or transverse walls with wide or narrow spacing. One unique solution used closely spaced transverse load-bearing walls made of frame panels with shelves and posts, transferring floor loads through edge supports—a blend of frame and wall systems.

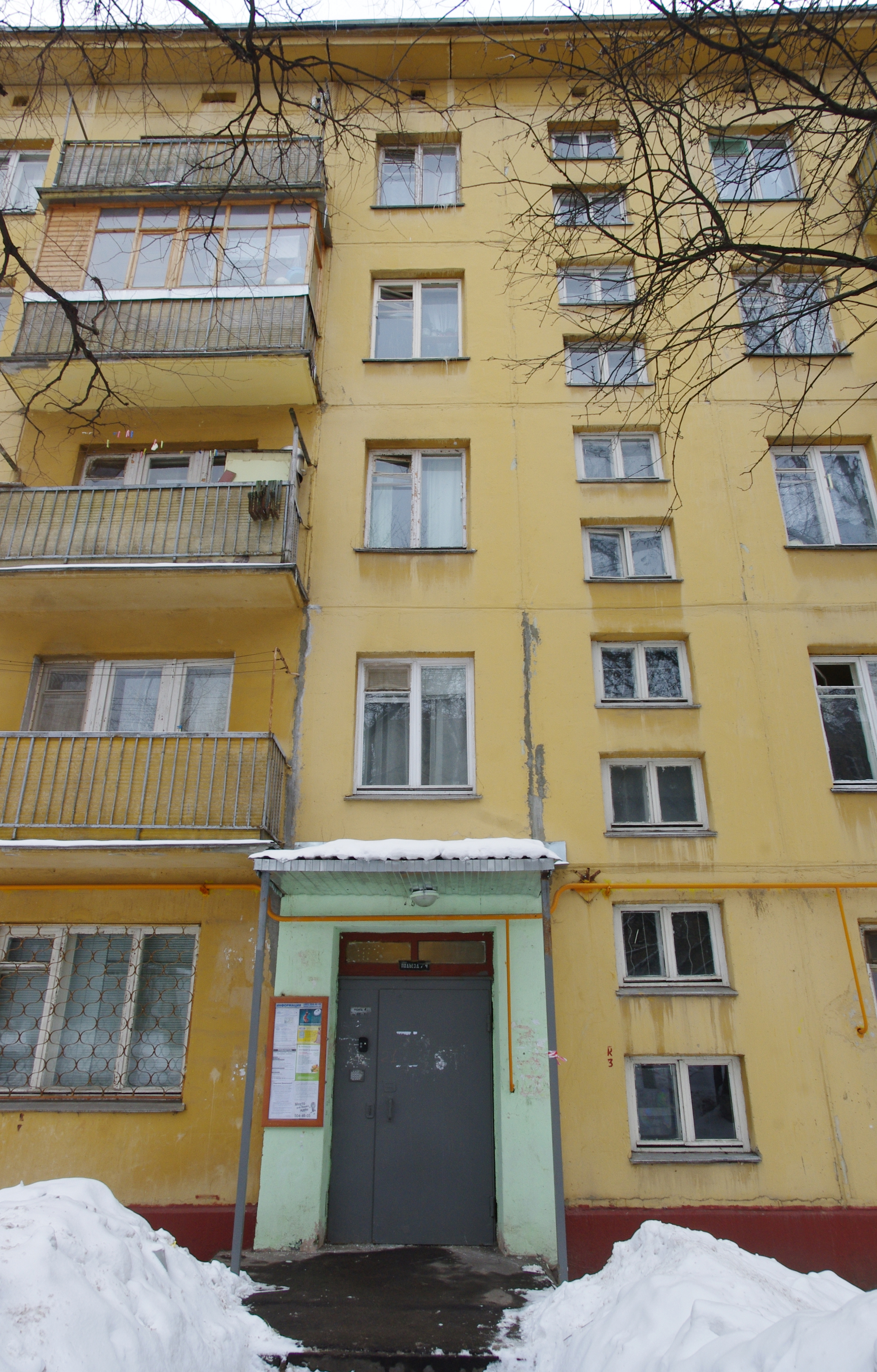
Version 1-515, built in 1963

=== Exterior ===
These houses reflect postwar functionalist architecture common in Europe, but Soviet constraints—cost-cutting, political pressure, and a focus on technological efficiency—resulted in overly simplistic facades and monotonous, faceless developments.

The exterior look stemmed from the nature and production of reinforced concrete structures, though their uniform, limited range stifled expressiveness. Outer panels of the most common designs typically featured a square shape (room-sized) with a central square window, creating repetitive facades marked by a grid of seams. Poor construction quality, lack of effective sealants, and scarce finishing materials worsened the effect. Houses stood out only by series traits: scale, stark simplicity with minimal protrusions, or staircase window shapes. Often, the potential of structural designs went unused, as seen in some series where non-load-bearing outer walls or unique panel shapes weren't highlighted.

Architect D. Zadorin praises certain designs: some had corner walls with solid ends and striking facade compositions, while others featured massive, white-painted blocks with ribbed attic elements, with single-section 8- and 9-story buildings acting as focal points amid 5-story surroundings.

Architect Georgiy Shemyakin, using one example, defined the emerging Soviet style:

The continuously evolving principles of typification, standardization, and intra- and inter-industry unification contribute to the development of common, stable stylistic features. ... All key parameters of this series' designs are based on the Unified Modular System, ensuring consistency in planning solutions while allowing for multiple construction variations. This approach enables the construction of not only residential buildings with different apartment layouts, lengths, and heights but also most cultural and public service buildings within residential districts—all using a limited set of industrially manufactured components. The new principles of designing comprehensive building series help establish common structural characteristics across different buildings while also allowing for greater variety and expressiveness in urban development. A completely new feature of the socialist architectural style in recent years is its integration with factory-based housing production and the assembly-line construction process.

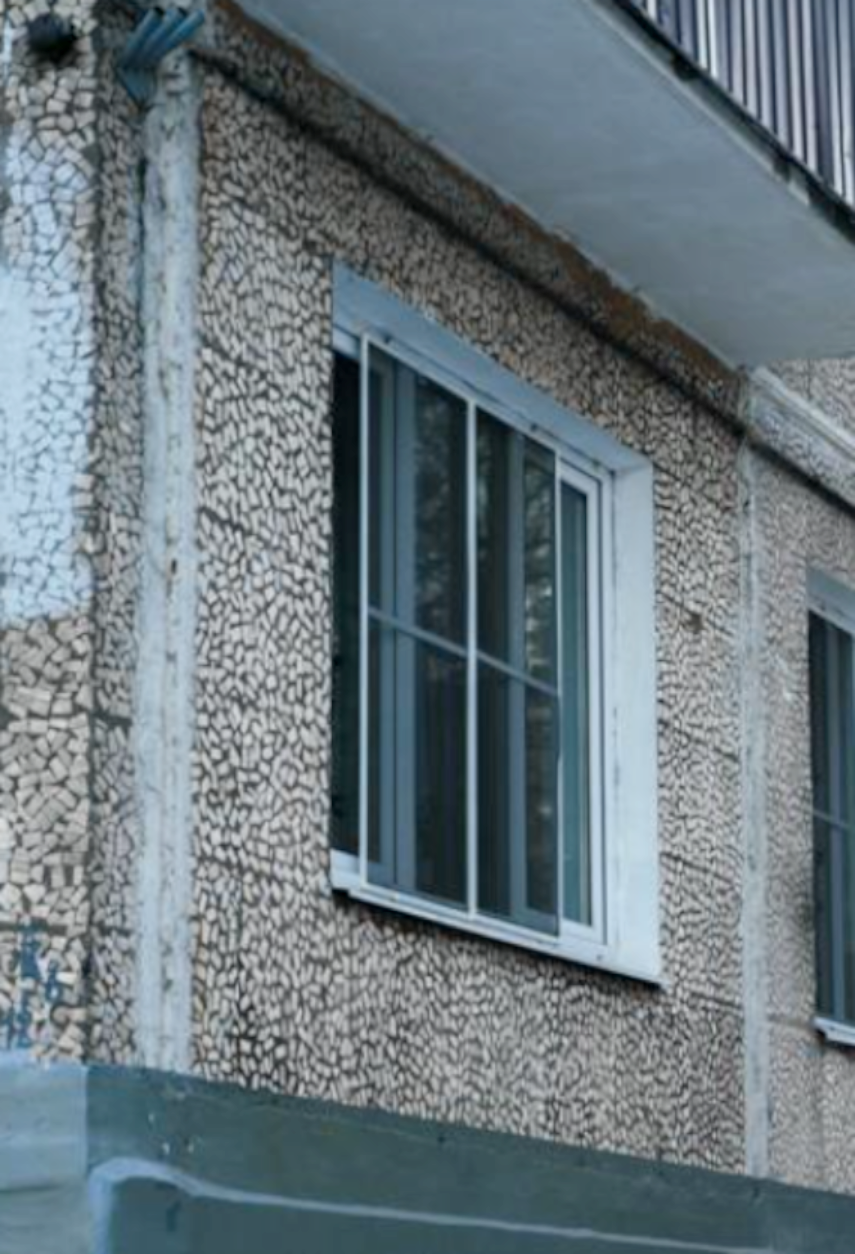
Finishing with ceramic tile cladding of panels 1-515/5 in Moscow

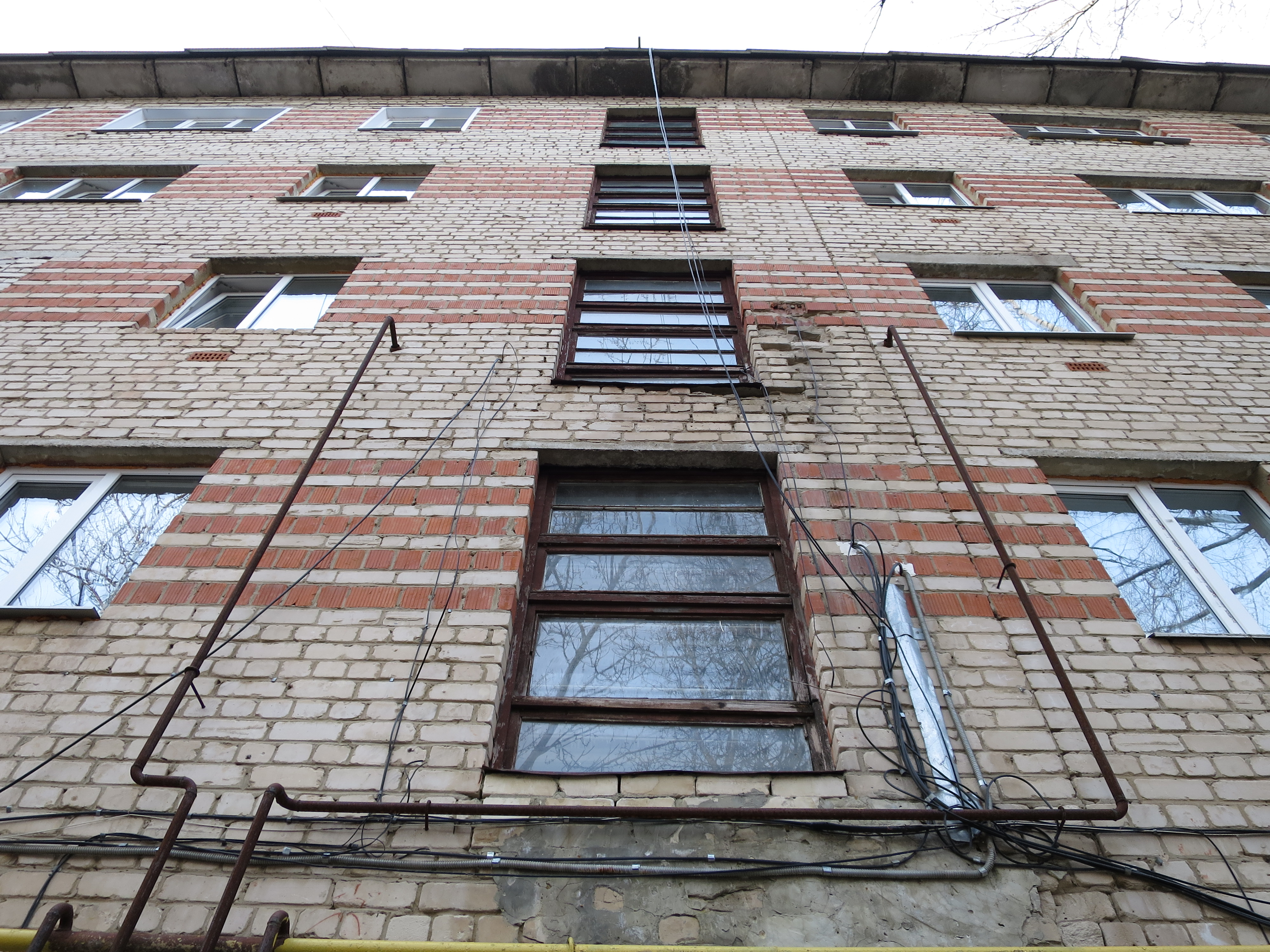
Brickwork made of ceramic and silicate bricks, stairwell windows of building 1-447 in Arzamas

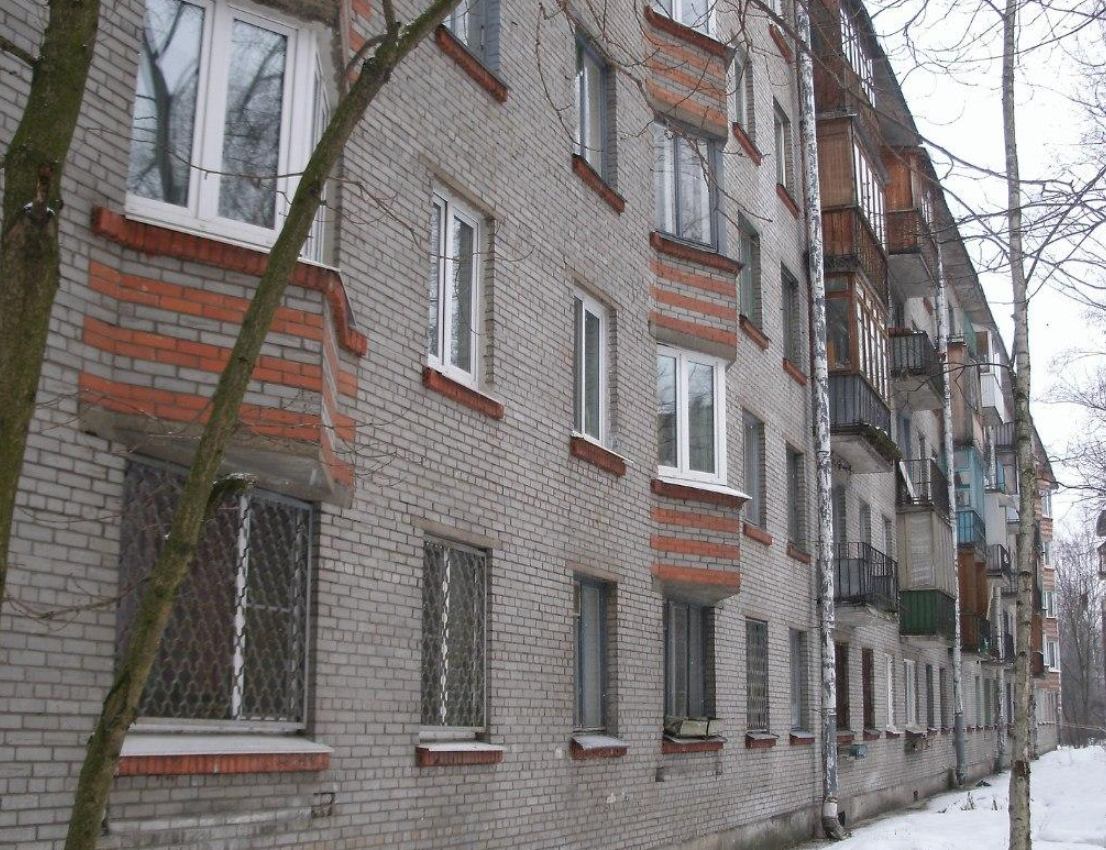
Bay windows of building 1-528 in Saint Petersburg

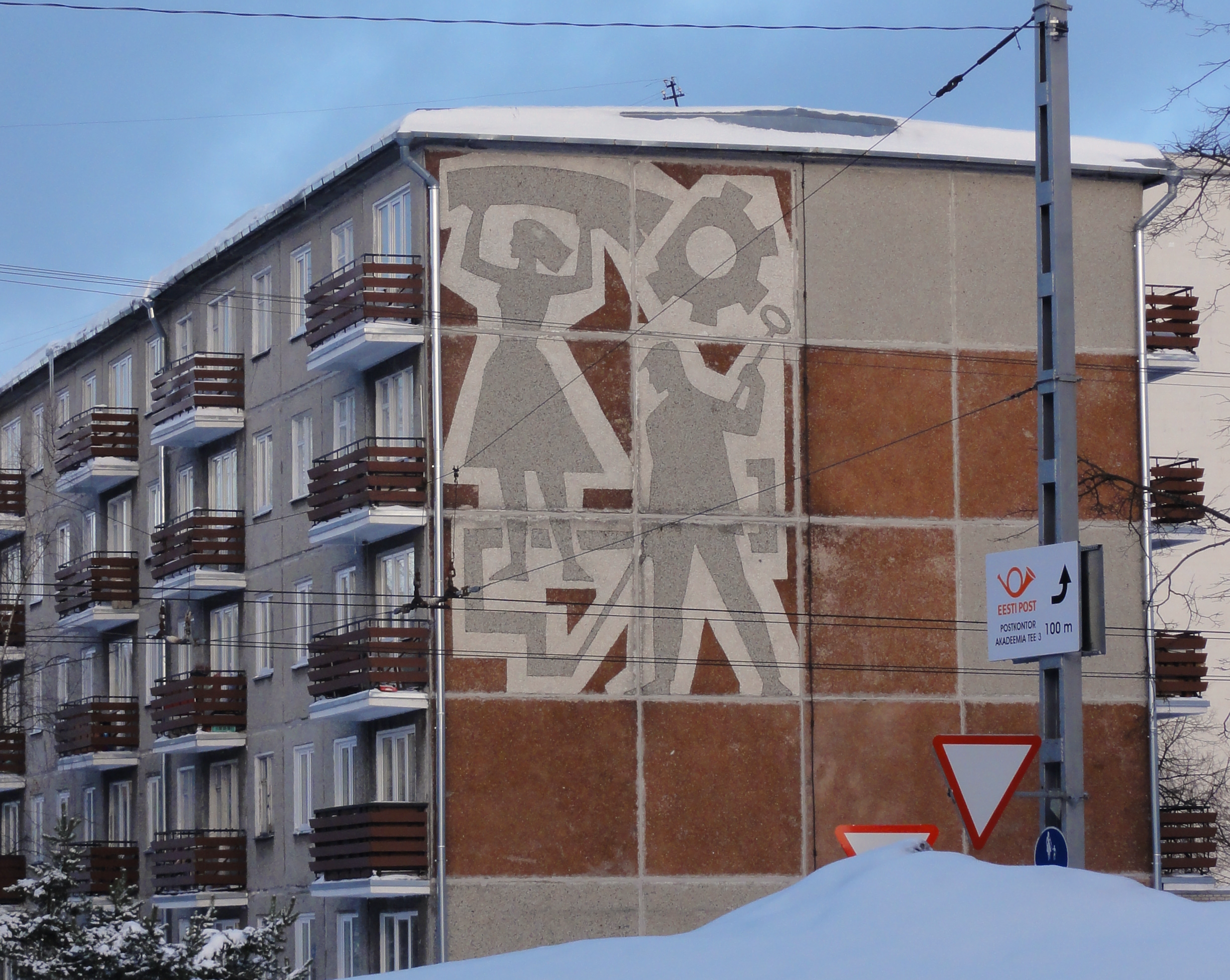
Original sgraffito and restored lattice-slatted balcony railings on building 1-464 in Tallinn

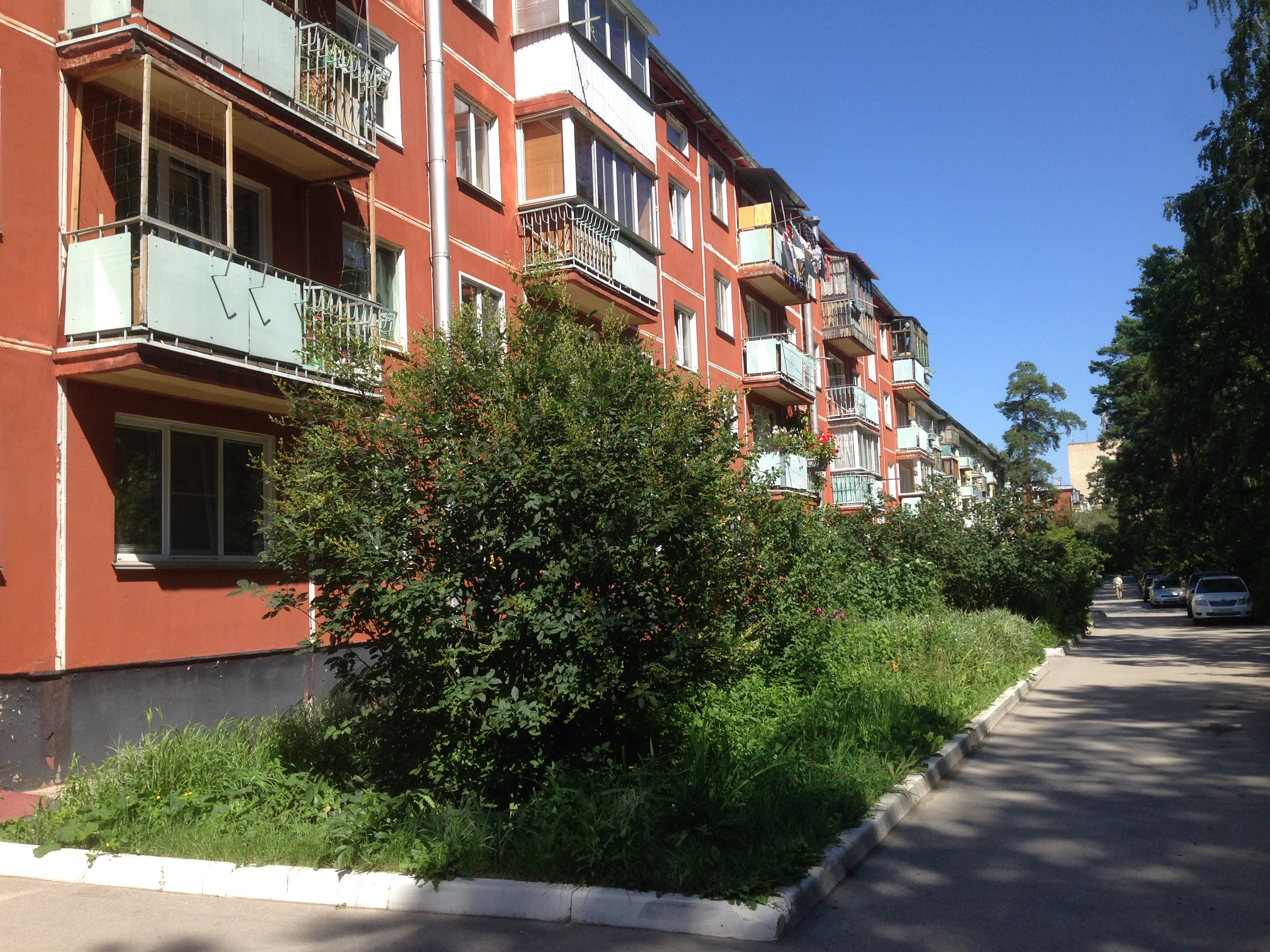
Building 1-464 in Novosibirsk. On the left—original lattice-sheet balcony railings with flower boxes

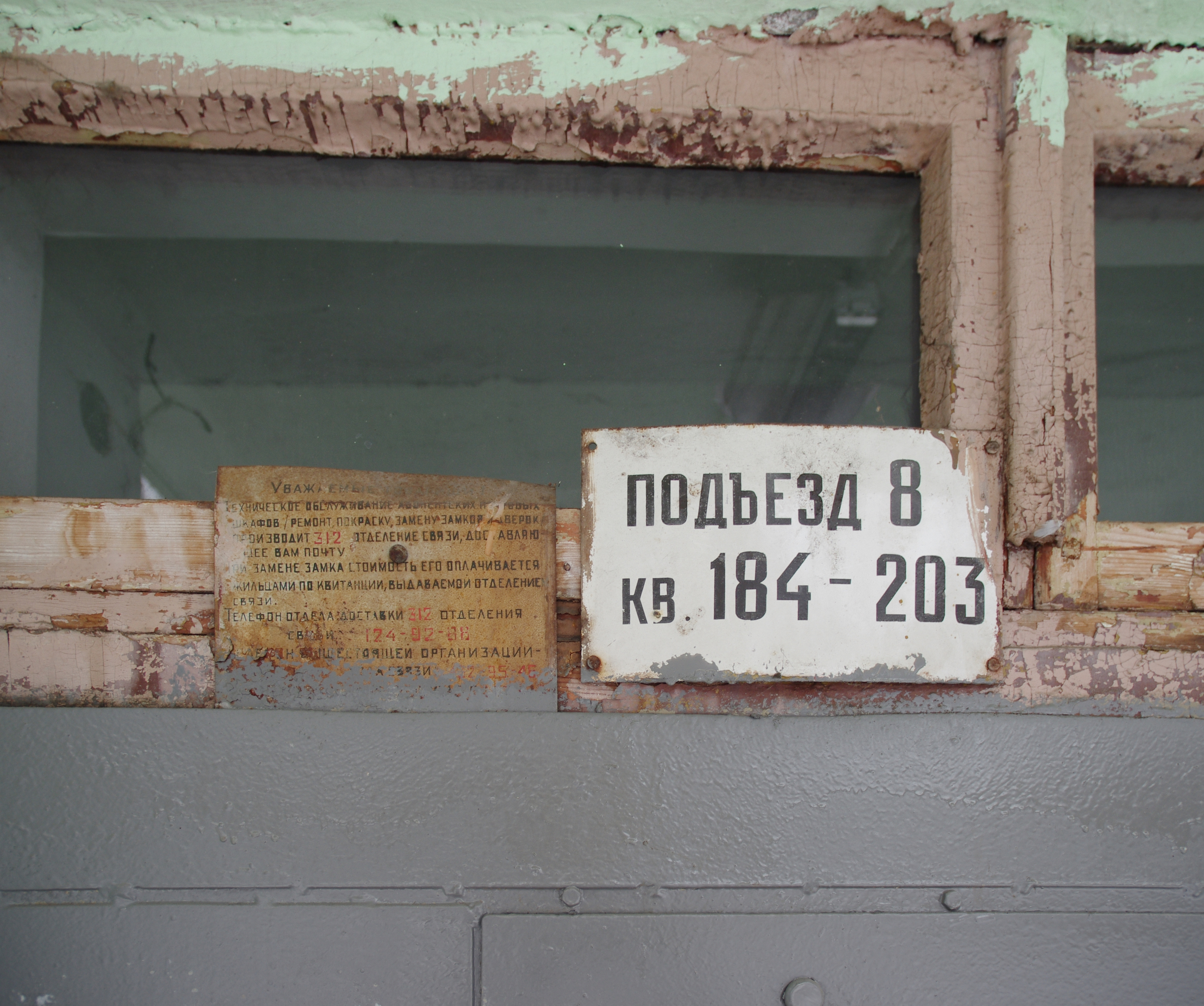
Soviet-style address plaques on the wooden transom of the entrance door of building 1-515 in Moscow

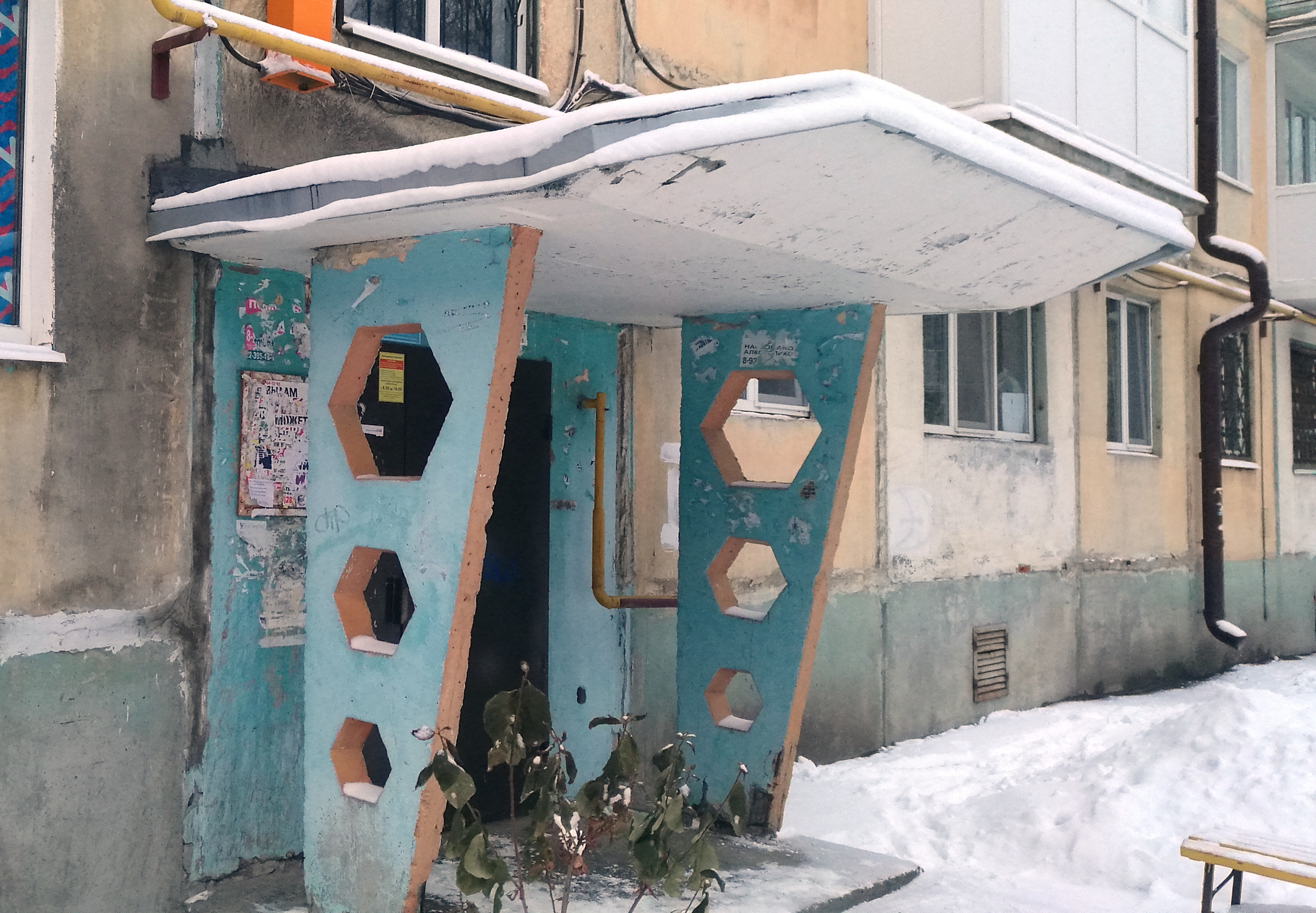
Entrance design of building 1-464 in Tyumen

=== Interiors ===
The turn in Soviet architecture led to the rejection of excessive decorativeness in interiors, of moldings and complex profiles of joinery. Frequent division of window and door fillings was replaced by simple large forms. Electrical wiring became hidden.

The flooring in basements was finished with asphalt concrete and cement coverings; in living rooms - plank floors, fibreboard floors, parquet, linoleum and PVC tiles; in bathrooms - ceramic tiles or linoleum on cement waterproofing or on asbestos-cement sheets with waterproofing between them; in kitchens and hallways - plank floors, linoleum and PVC tiles. The walls were covered with wallpaper and painted; ceramic tiles were also used in bathrooms and kitchens.

Finishing works followed the path of industrialization. Plank floors and fibreboard floors were often installed from pre-fabricated panels; attempts were made to make floors from gypsum cement concrete panels for a room for subsequent finishing; wall panels were delivered to the construction site prepared for finishing and with window and door units inserted; sanitary cabins were delivered with interior finishing; there was a tendency to minimize wet processes at the construction site.

Wooden window units with internal and external hinged sashes (paired or separate) of equal width, and vents for ventilation were installed. Window units had poor build quality and did not meet operational and thermal engineering requirements. Experiments were undertaken to install windows with sashes of different widths (Moscow), with sliding sashes (Kostroma). Window sills were reinforced concrete. Interior doors were panel doors with a wooden frame and facing with fiberboard, chipboard, plywood, veneer for painting with enamels or varnishes, blind and glazed. GOST 6629-58 required that doors with panels be phased out by 1960. Skirting boards and door frames were painted wood.

As part of the propaganda of a modern urban lifestyle, numerous advisory literature was published, aimed at people of peasant origin moving to large cities. It not only taught etiquette, but also promoted a modernist living environment, contrasting it with the "bourgeois taste" of Stalin's "grand style":

Bulky Slavic wardrobes, colossal sideboards and "three-bed" ottomans, which occupied more than half of the entire area of the apartment, are irrevocably a thing of the past. They are being replaced by light, simple and strict furniture, providing maximum convenience and not cluttering up the rooms. — V. I. Kantor. "Art and Everyday Life". — 1961

The manifestation of the values of the "thaw" was the exhibition "Art into Everyday Life" in 1961, which showed furniture and household items stylistically consistent with the products of Western countries. Furniture for typical small apartments itself had to be typical and compact. The main types of furniture were sideboards, partition cabinets, wall cabinets, built-in cabinets, book shelves with sliding glass doors, sofa beds, armchair beds and other "transformers" taken from the experience of constructivism, coffee tables. Furniture designers sought to use light colors. Furniture was placed along the perimeter of the rooms, creating practically identical interiors.

Huge chandeliers and fabric lampshades were replaced by more compact lighting fixtures using plastic, lampshades and floor lamps.

The background of exemplary interiors was walls painted in bright, light and warm colors, plain wallpaper with minimal ornamentation. Bright colorful spots of furniture upholstery and curtains served as accents. However, the industry lagged behind the requirements of design and continued to produce outdated wallpaper. Light curtains without draperies, cotton tablecloths, plain colors, geometric and stylized plant prints were included in textile design. Due to the poverty of the population, the interiors of the 1960s retained old furniture of the Stalinist "grand style", as well as handicrafts, forming a homemade eclectic design.

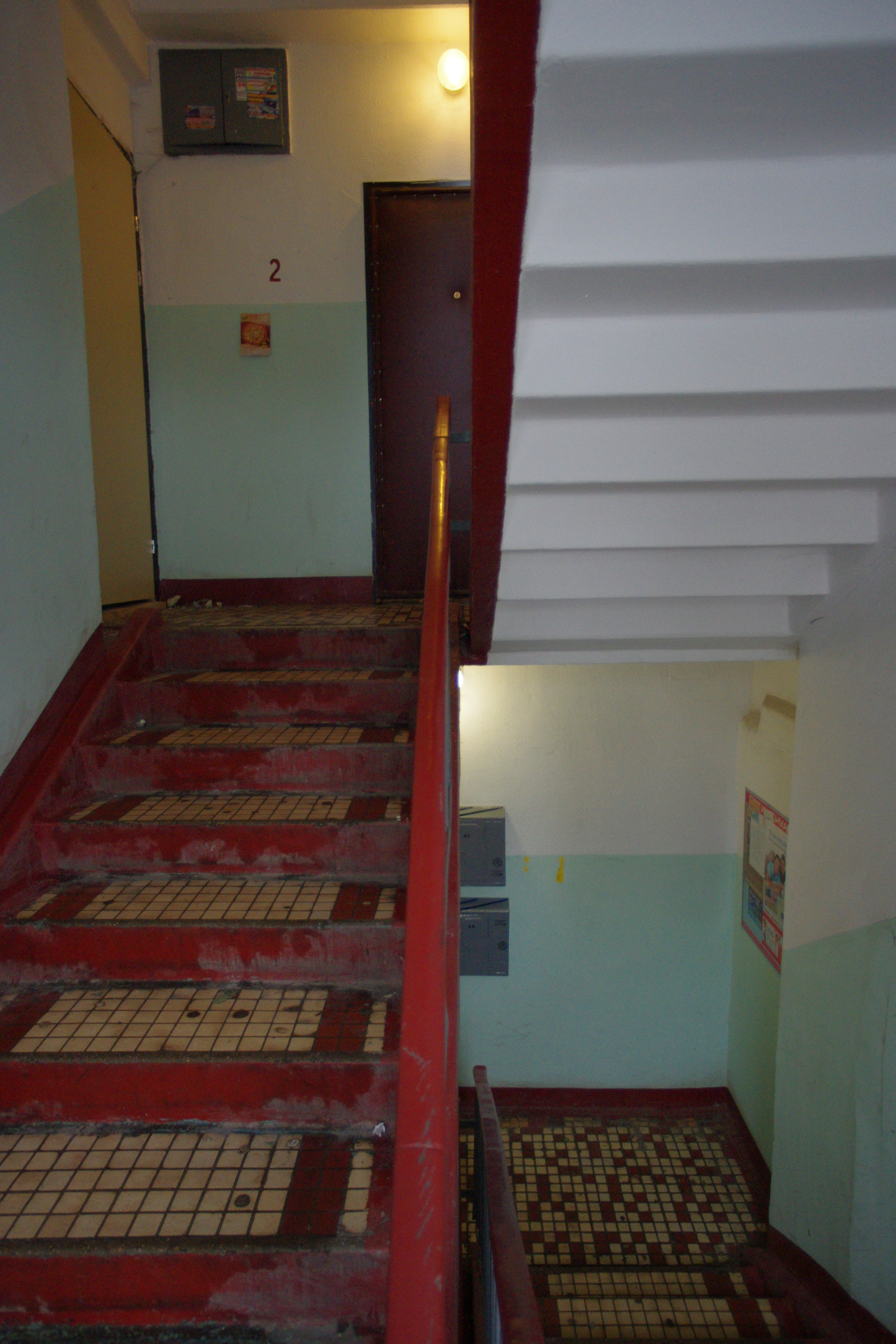
Staircase of K-7 with tiled finish

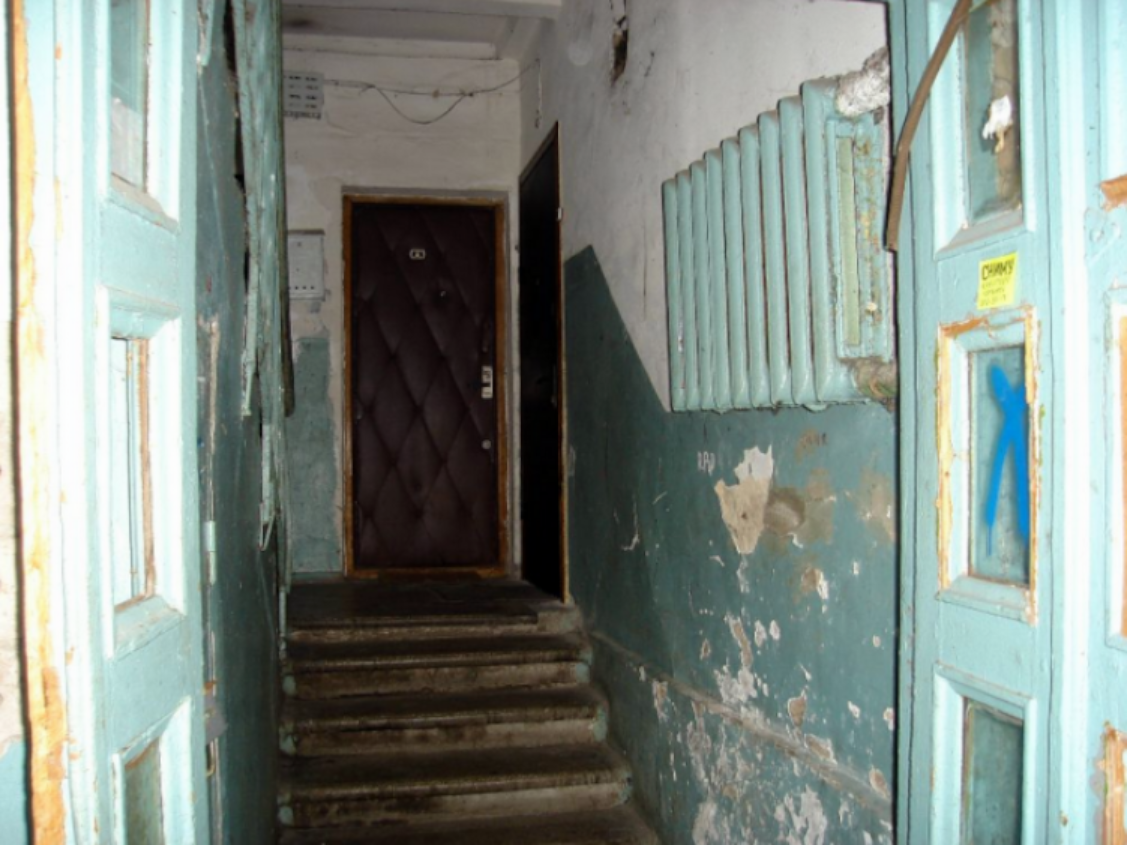
Staircase of 1-438 and vestibule panel door

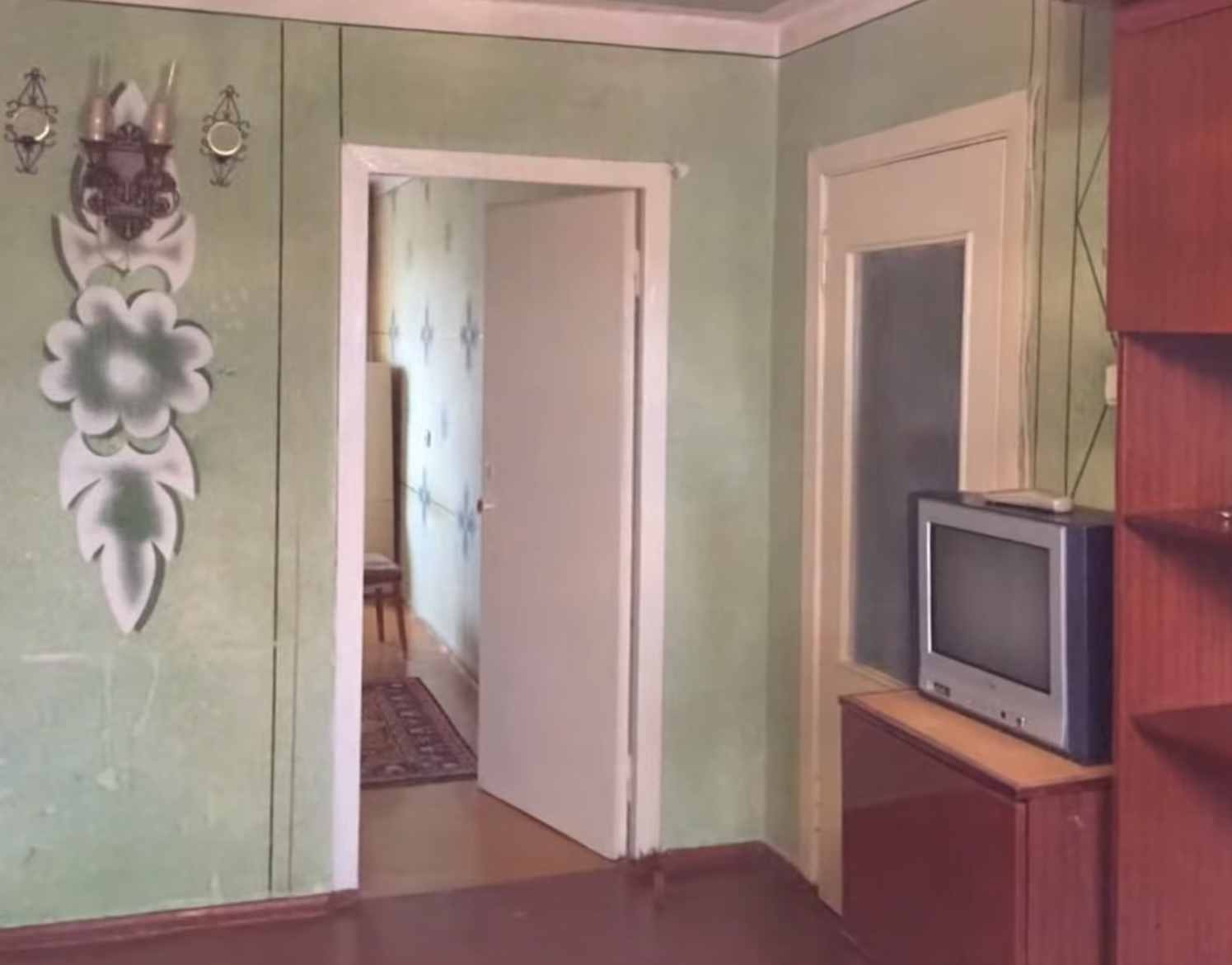
Interior of a room with original doors and painted floor

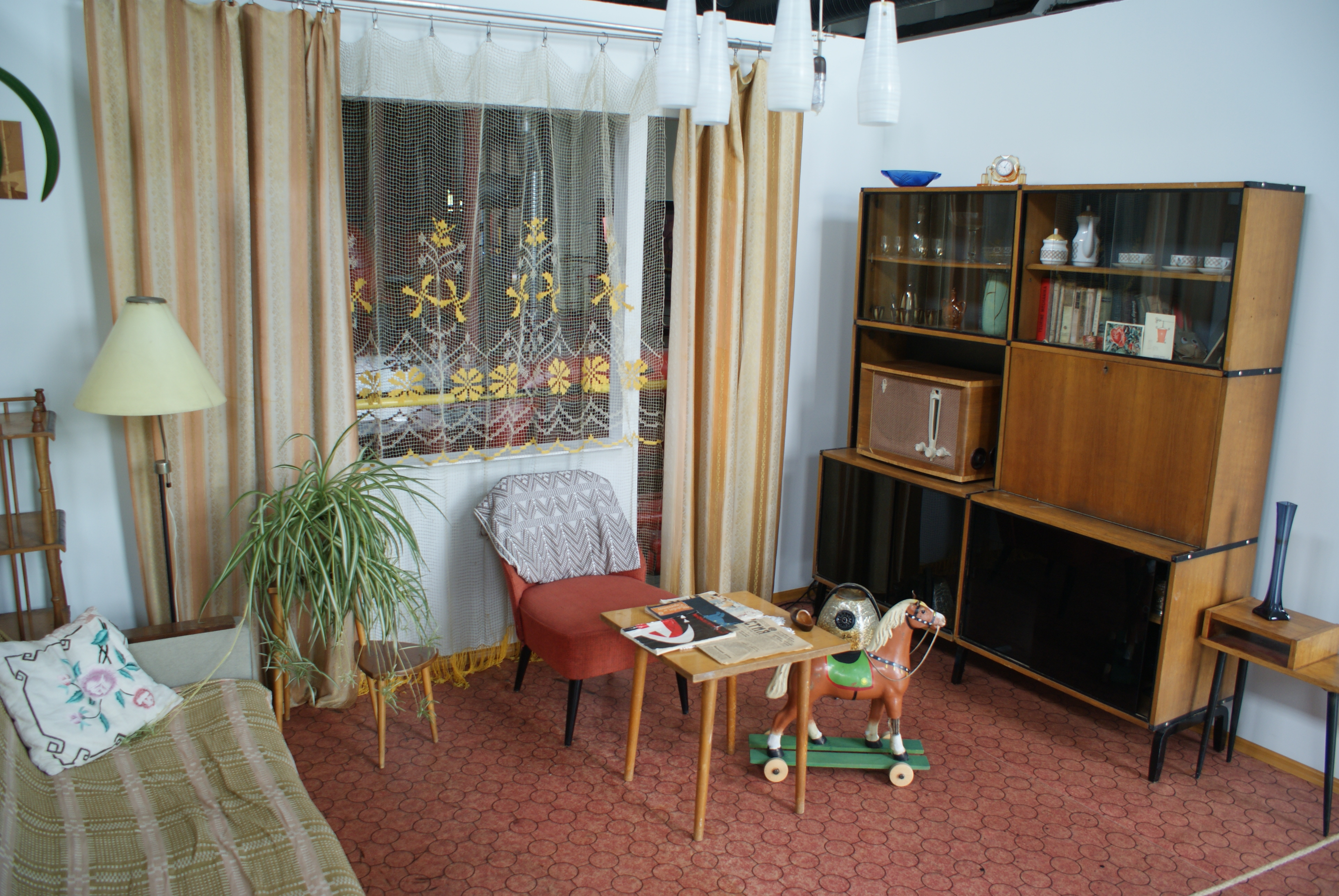
Replica of a typical interior in the Vilnius Energy and Technology Museum

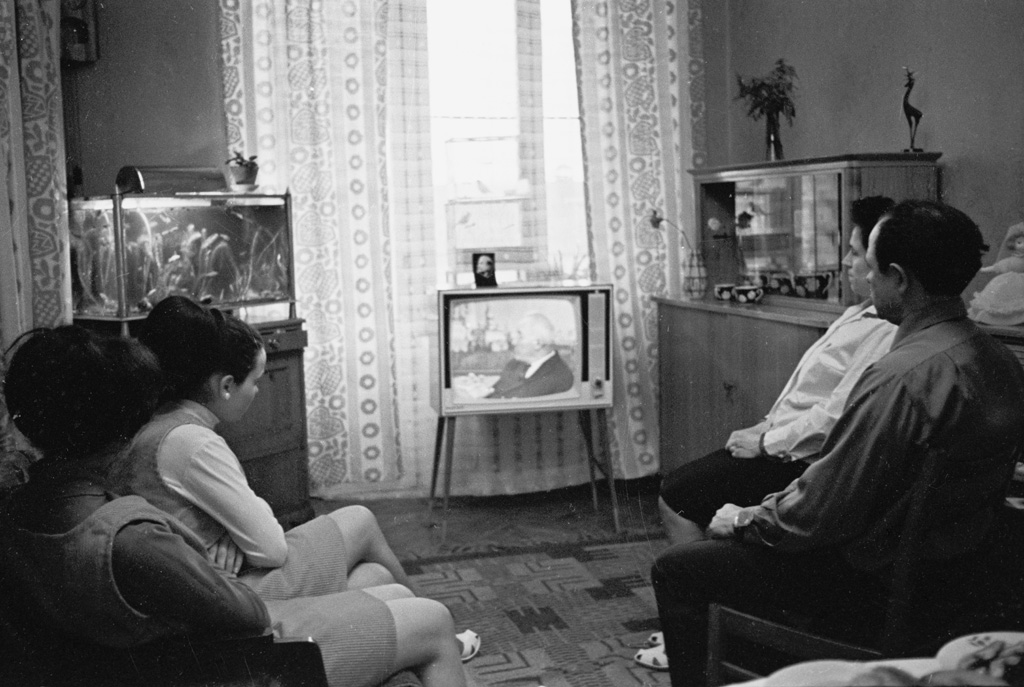
A family of textile factory workers in a common room watching TV

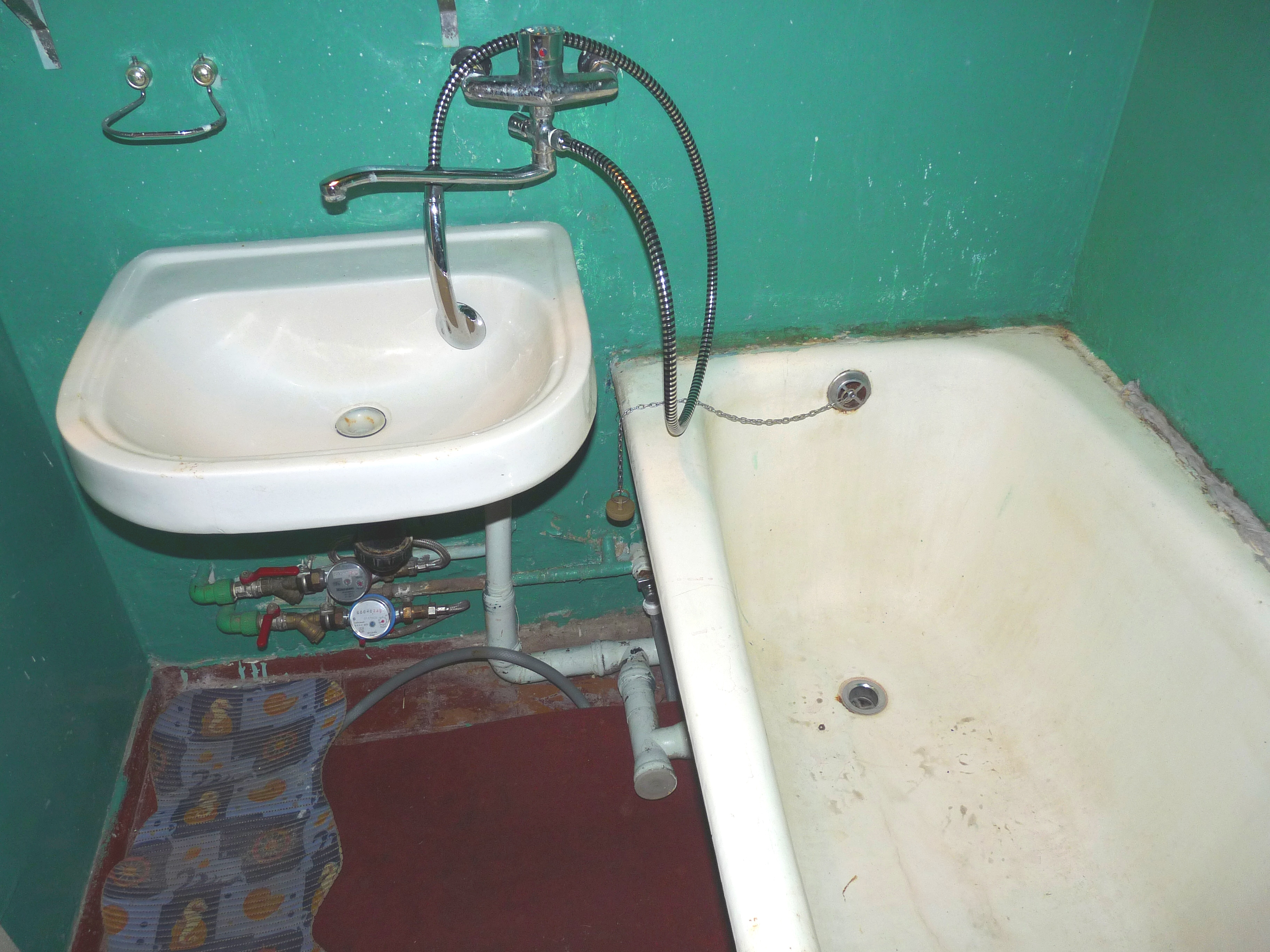
A bathroom with a sink and a bathtub

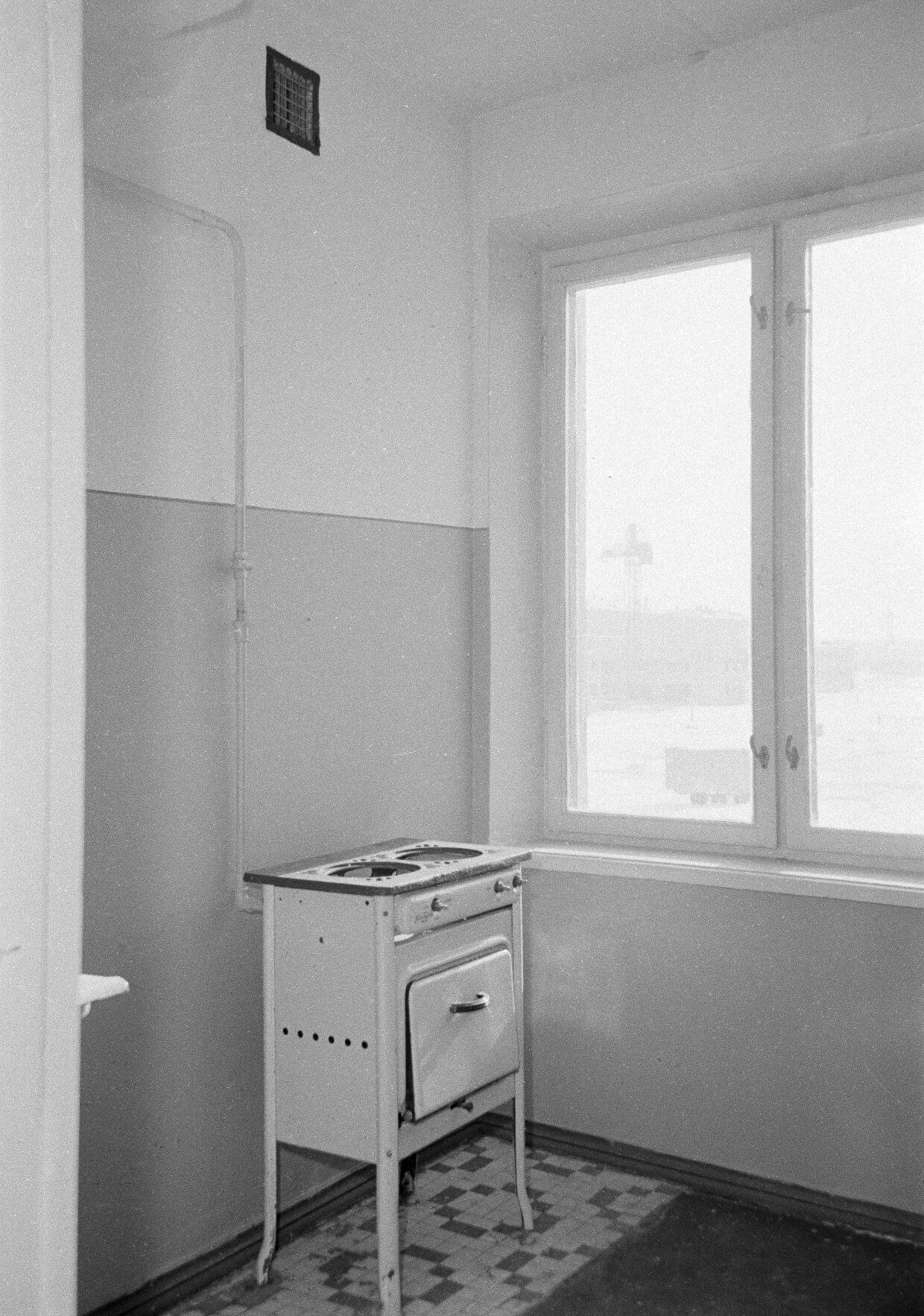
Kitchen interior upon commissioning of the house

== Notable series ==
Structural system	Structural diagram	Name	Image	Author	Areas of main distribution
Frame-wall Reinforced concrete prefabricated frame, wall panels	Double-span Incomplete internal frame, load-bearing external longitudinal walls	1-335		Lengorstroyproekt, Leningrad (director Lev Gerasimovich Yuzbashev)	Most of the USSR
Frame Reinforced concrete prefabricated frame	Double-span Full frame, external longitudinal walls self-supporting	1-335А, 1-335К, 1-335АК		Lengorstroyproekt, Leningrad (director Lev Gerasimovich Yuzbashev)	Most of the USSR
Wall Wall panels	Two-span Three longitudinal load-bearing walls	1-463		Giprograzhdanstroy Gosstroy of the Ukrainian SSR	Ukraine
Wall Wall panels	Two-span Three longitudinal load-bearing walls	1-465		Design Institute No. 2 of the Ministry of Construction of the RSFSR, Moscow	
Wall Wall panels	Two-span Three longitudinal load-bearing walls	1-480 (large-panel)		KievZNIIEP	Ukraine
Wall Wall panels	Two-span Three longitudinal load-bearing walls	1-507		Lenproekt, Workshop No. 5 of Leningrad (head Evgeny Adolfovich Levinson)	Saint Petersburg and Leningrad oblast
Wall Wall panels	Two-span Three longitudinal load-bearing walls	1-515/5		MITEP, Moscow	Moscow and Moscow oblast
Wall Wall panels	Two-span Three longitudinal load-bearing walls	1Р-303		Mosgrazhdanproekt, Moscow	Moscow, Moscow oblast
Wall Wall panels	Two-span Three longitudinal load-bearing walls	ТКБ-3/ТКБ-4		Promstroyproekt, Chelyabinsk	Chelyabinsk oblast
Wall Wall panels	Cross-wall Longitudinal and transverse with a narrow pitch load-bearing walls	1-464		Giprostroyindustriya, Moscow (headed by N.P. Rozanov)	Most of the USSR
Wall Wall panels	Cross-wall Longitudinal and transverse with a narrow pitch load-bearing walls	1-466		Vesnin Workshop Mosoblproekt, together with the Research Institute of Building Physics and Enclosing Structures of the USSR Academy of Construction and Architecture, Moscow	Moscow, Moscow oblast
Wall Wall panels	Cross-wall Longitudinal and transverse with a narrow pitch load-bearing walls	1-605а		Giprostroyindustriya, Moscow	Moscow and Moscow oblast
Wall Wall panels	Cross-wall Longitudinal and transverse with a narrow pitch load-bearing walls	1МГ-300		MITEP, Moscow	Moscow
Wall Wall panels	Wide-step transverse load-bearing walls	Ги		Lenproekt, Workshop No. 7, Leningrad (head Valentin Alexandrovich Kamensky)	Saint Petersburg
Wall Wall panels	Wide-step transverse load-bearing walls	1-467		Reinforced Concrete Design Bureau of Glavoblstroymaterialov, Moscow (head A.A. Yakushev)	Moscow oblast, Surgut, Tyumen, Tomsk, Kazan and others.
Wall Wall panels	Wide-step transverse load-bearing walls	1-468		Gorstroyproekt, Moscow	Ukraine, Russia
Wall Wall panels	Narrow pitch transverse load-bearing walls	II-32			Moscow and Moscow oblast
Wall Wall panels	Narrow pitch transverse load-bearing walls	II-35		SAKB GlavAPU, Moscow	Moscow
Wall Wall panels	Narrow pitch transverse load-bearing walls	II-07		MITEP, Research Institute of Building Physics and Enclosing Structures of the USSR Academy of Construction and Architecture, Moscow	Moscow
Wall Wall panels	Transverse load-bearing walls made of narrow-spaced beams	К-7 ОД		Mosproekt, Workshop No. 7, Moscow (head Vitaly Lagutenko)	Moscow, Moscow oblast, Saratov, Tula, Tolyatti, Astana, Saint Petersburg (as OD)
Wall Large blocks, brick, brick blocks	Wide-step transverse load-bearing walls	Г		Lenproekt, Workshop No. 7, Leningrad (head Valentin Alexandrovich Kamensky)	Leningrad
Wall Large blocks, brick, brick blocks	Wide-step transverse load-bearing walls	II-18/9		SAKB, Workshop No. 6, Moscow (headed by Nathan Abramovich Osterman)	Moscow, Donetsk
Wall Large blocks, brick, brick blocks	Two-span Three longitudinal load-bearing walls	1-308			Kazakhstan
Wall Large blocks, brick, brick blocks	Two-span Three longitudinal load-bearing walls	1-310		TashZNIIEP, Tashkent	Uzbekistan
Wall Large blocks, brick, brick blocks	Two-span Three longitudinal load-bearing walls	1-311		Moldgiprostroy, Chisinau	Moldova and Ukraine
Wall Large blocks, brick, brick blocks	Two-span Three longitudinal load-bearing walls	1-317		Estonproekt, Tallinn	Baltic States
Wall Large blocks, brick, brick blocks	Two-span Three longitudinal load-bearing walls	1-318			Baltic States
Wall Large blocks, brick, brick blocks	Two-span Three longitudinal load-bearing walls	1-338		Giprograzhdanpromstroy, Kyiv	Moldova and Ukraine
Wall Large blocks, brick, brick blocks	Two-span Three longitudinal load-bearing walls	1-434		Belgosproekt, Minsk	Belarus
Wall Large blocks, brick, brick blocks	Two-span Three longitudinal load-bearing walls	1-437		Giprograd, Kyiv	Moldova and Ukraine
Wall Large blocks, brick, brick blocks	Two-span Three longitudinal load-bearing walls	1-438		Giprograd, Kyiv	Moldova and Ukraine
Wall Large blocks, brick, brick blocks	Two-span Three longitudinal load-bearing walls	1-439		Leningrad branch of Gorstroyproekt	Most of the USSR
Wall Large blocks, brick, brick blocks	Two-span Three longitudinal load-bearing walls	1-447		Giprogor, Moscow	Most of the USSR
Wall Large blocks, brick, brick blocks	Two-span Three longitudinal load-bearing walls	1-480 (large block)		Giprograzhdanpromstroy, Kyiv	Ukraine
Wall Large blocks, brick, brick blocks	Two-span Three longitudinal load-bearing walls	1-510 (II-17)		SAKB, Moscow	Moscow and Moscow oblast
Wall Large blocks, brick, brick blocks	Two-span Three longitudinal load-bearing walls	1-511		SAKB, Moscow	Moscow and Moscow oblast
Wall Large blocks, brick, brick blocks	Two-span Three longitudinal load-bearing walls	1-528		Lenproekt, Leningrad	Russia
Wall Large blocks, brick, brick blocks	Two-span Three longitudinal load-bearing walls	II-29		MITEP, Moscow	Moscow, Samara
Wall Large blocks, brick, brick blocks	Two-span Three longitudinal load-bearing walls	II-34		SAKB, Moscow	Moscow
Volumetric-block Reinforced concrete products	Spatial cells consisting of "caps" across the entire width of the building (for two rooms) and floor slabs	II-38		MITEP and Research Institute of Reinforced Concrete, Moscow	Moscow
References: 1. Мойзер Ф., Задорин Д. (2018). К типологии советского типового домостроения. Индустриальное жилищное строительство в СССР [On the typology of Soviet standard housing construction. Industrial housing construction in the USSR]. Berlin: DOM. pp. 167–253/448.; 2. Лебина Н. (2024). Хрущёвка. Советское и несоветское в пространстве повседневности. Культура повседневности. М.: Новое литературное обозрение. pp. 410–411/424. ISBN 978-5-4448-2247-0.; 3. Шабурников В. Н. (1962). Крупнопанельное домостроение (из опыта строительства в Челябинске). М.: Государственное издательство литературы по строительству, архитектуре и строительным материалам. pp. /80.; 4. "Жилищное строительство — под контроль общественности". Архитектура СССР. 1961.; 5. Капустян Е. (1964). "Улучшенные варианты типовых проектов жилых домов". Жилищное строительство.; 6. "Много фото: когда и почему в Эстонии появились хрущевки". Postimees. 14 February 2017. Archived from the original on 15 February 2017.; 7. Хрущевские панельные, кирпичные и блочные серии домов на RussianRealty.ru

== Deterioration ==
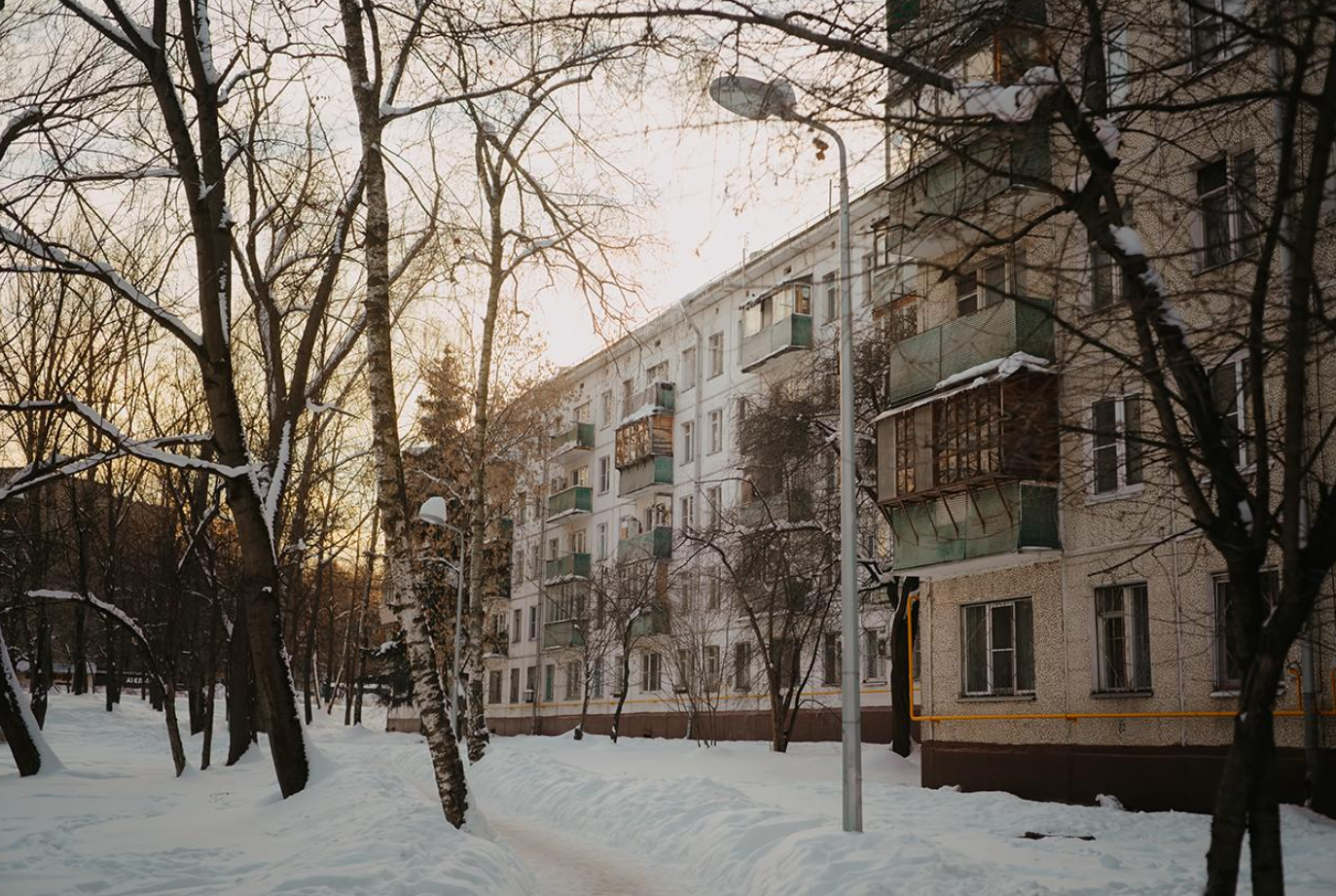
Winter courtyard of houses 1-510

The standard service life of these buildings is 125 years. Surveys conducted in the 2010s indicated that, in most cases, there were no structural damages affecting the overall stability and strength of the buildings, and the load-bearing structures had not yet exhausted their resource.

As of 2024, data from the Russian GIS Housing and Utilities Management System (GIS ЖКХ) shows that the average wear and tear of multi-apartment residential buildings constructed between 1958 and 1970 in Russia is 40.1%. By management type: 38.6% for buildings managed by management companies, 36.6% for housing cooperatives, 33.8% for housing construction cooperatives (ЖК), and 47.1% for buildings under direct management.

Surveys of 1-335 series buildings in Izhevsk revealed that wear in some buildings could reach 60%. The situation is particularly problematic for 1-335 buildings in oblasts with high seismic activity.

== Present day, reconstruction and modernization ==
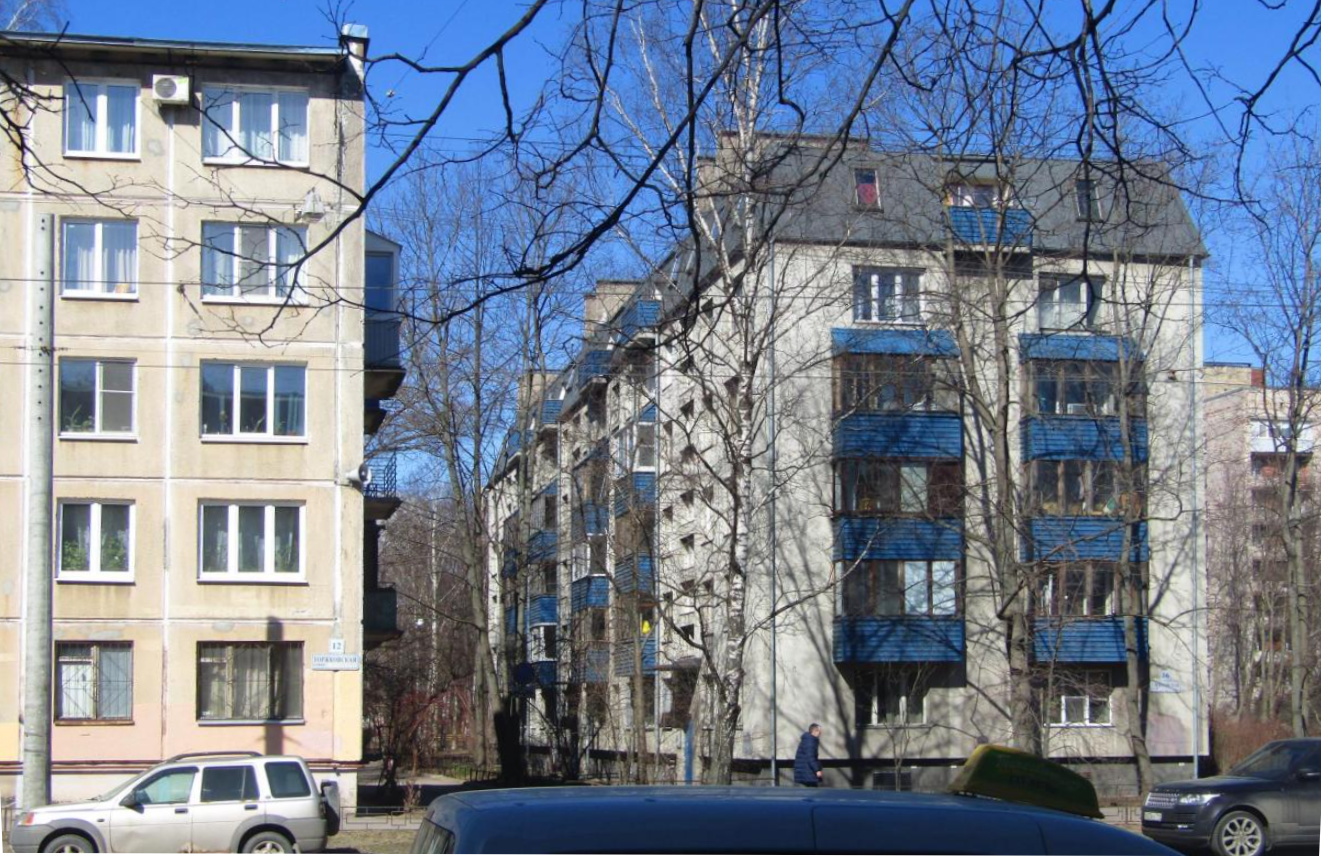
One of the few examples of modernization with an add-on in Russia. House 1-507 in St. Petersburg

The panel buildings called khrushchevka are found in great numbers all over the former Soviet Union. They were originally considered to be temporary housing until the housing shortage could be alleviated by mature communism, which would not have any shortages. Khrushchev predicted the achievement of communism in 20 years (by the 1980s). Later, Leonid Brezhnev promised each family an apartment "with a separate room for each person plus one room extra", but many people continue to live in khrushchevkas today.

In the 1980s, a working group led by historian and architectural theorist Yuri Volchok at the Central Research Institute of Architecture developed a methodology for reconstructing first-generation buildings. Volchok argued that these microdistricts, now in central city areas, should not remain mere bedroom communities. He proposed revitalizing them with projects like youth residential complexes or experimental construction hubs.

In 1986, an All-Union competition for five-story building reconstruction was held. The winning project proposed adding floors, eliminating walk-through rooms, expanding kitchens and living spaces, installing elevators and garbage chutes, and improving engineering systems. Many entries included attics and pitched roofs. The Central Research Institute of Housing and Urban Planning later issued guidelines for reconstruction and modernization.

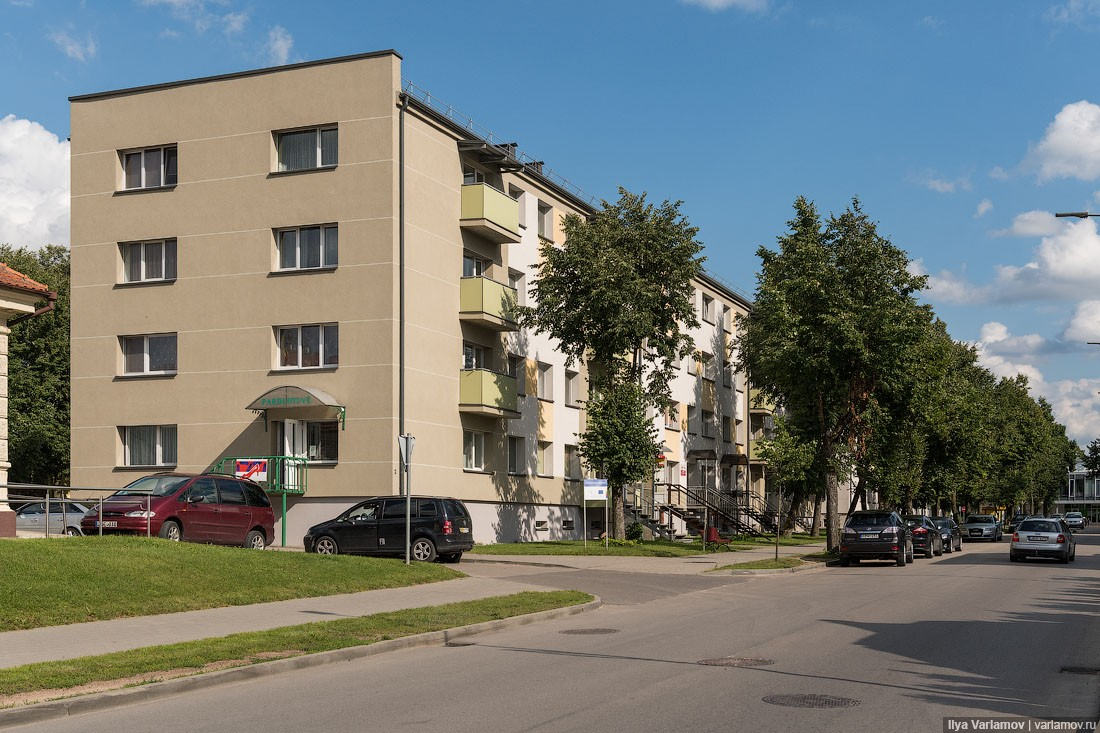
House after major renovation in Taurage, Lithuania

Khrushchevka standard types are classified into "disposable", with a planned 25-year life (Russian: сносимые серии, romanized: snosimye serii), and "permanent" (несносимые серии, nesnosimye serii). This distinction is important in Moscow and other affluent cities, where disposable khrushchevkas are being demolished to make way for new, higher-density construction. The City of Moscow had planned to complete this process by 2015. More than 1,300 out of around 1,700 buildings had been already demolished by 2012. In 2017, Moscow city authorities announced that some 8,000 khrushchevkas would be torn down, a move that would cause 1.6 million people to lose their homes. The announcement came after the completion of a smaller demolition project in which 1,700 buildings were torn down.

In some parts of the former Soviet Union and Eastern Bloc countries, efforts to renovate and beautify khrushchevkas have been made, such as in the Czech Republic, Slovakia, and Belarus. In many cities, khrushchevkas have been transformed from drab, gray buildings to colorful housing blocks through series of renovations. In addition, efforts to improve the quality of the buildings have been made. In Tartu, Estonia, the European Union-funded SmartEnCity turned three khrushchevka blocks into energy efficient "smart homes." The renovations are usually heavily subsidized by the state, and in many cases, by the European Union if the country is a member state of the EU. In Russia, Belarus, and Central Asia these same styles of renovations have not taken place, resulting in further dilapidation of the buildings or, in some cases, the demolition of many khrushchevkas. In these parts of the former Soviet Union, private renovation has been the norm, explaining the difference in the conditions of the buildings.

== Demolition ==
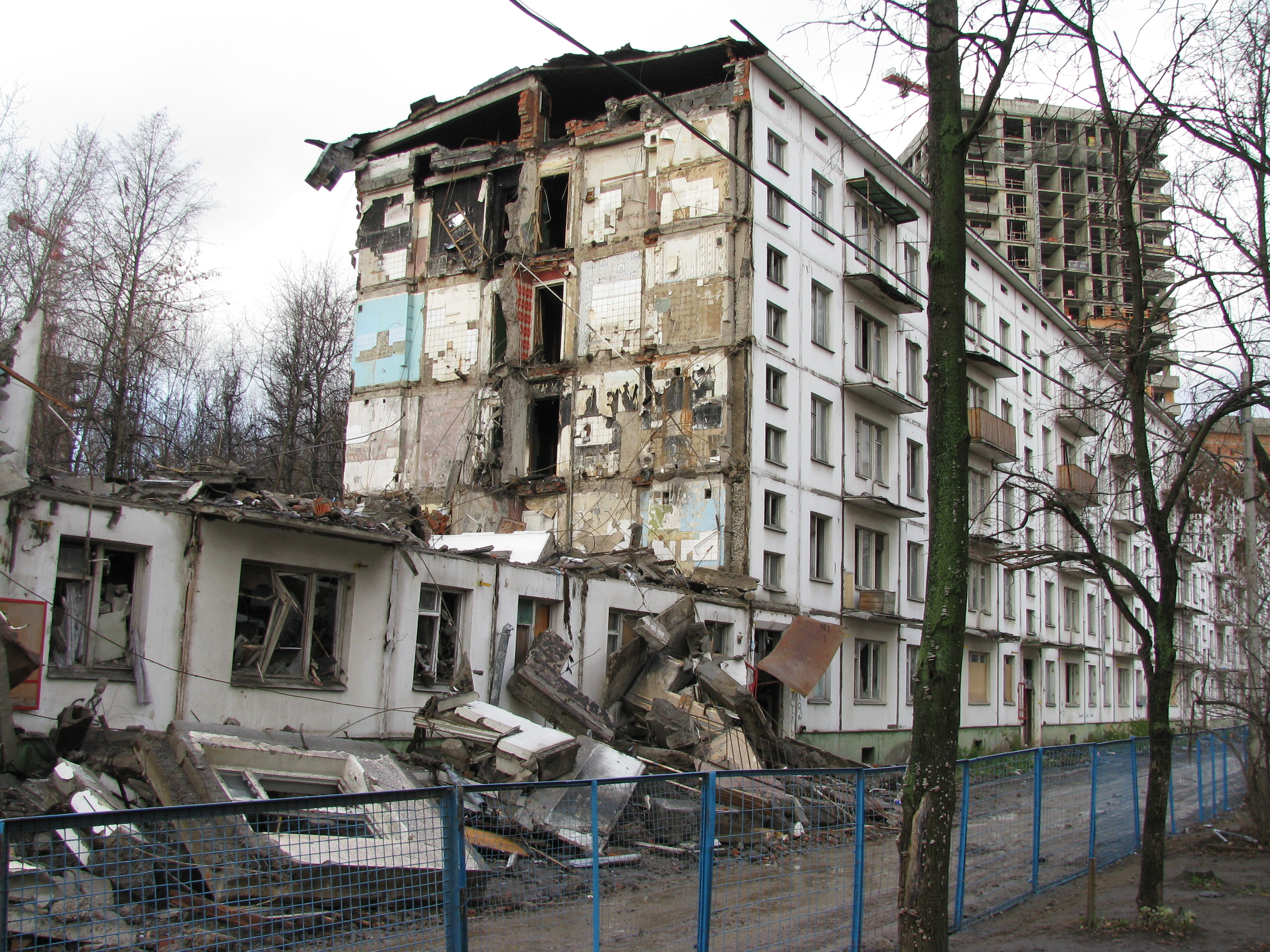
Demolition of Khrushchev-era buildings in Moscow

The mass demolition of Moscow's first-generation industrial housing began under Mayor Yuri M. Luzhkov in the late 1990s as part of the "Comprehensive Reconstruction Program." The designated "demolishable series" included K-7, II-32, II-35, 1MG-300, and 1-605a. Initially, private developers carried out the work under investment contracts with the city.

Following the Great Recession in Russia of 2008-2009, Moscow authorities continued the program using the city budget. As of early 2017, 71 buildings remained to be demolished under Luzhkov's program.

In 2017, Moscow Mayor Sergei Sobyanin and Russian President Vladimir Putin announced the Moscow Urban Renewal Initiative, also known as the "housing renovation program," a vast public works effort to revitalize the city's residential stock. This initiative targets the demolition of 5,171 dilapidated Khrushchevkas—buildings constructed between 1957 and 1968 using standardized wall and floor components, in poor condition, and typically no more than five stories tall—along with several thousand other residential structures, totaling 25 million m². The plan also encompasses pre-revolutionary buildings, Stalinist-era structures ("stalinkas"), houses from the architectural avant-garde period, individually designed buildings, and later projects. Upon completion, these will be replaced with modern residential buildings ranging from 6 to 20 stories. The plan upon completion will entail the relocation of 1.6 million city residents.

The new program for demolishing standardized houses faced criticism from the professional community and sparked discontent among residents. According to Rossiyskaya Gazeta, spontaneous protests against the program attracted approximately 35,000 participants. Opposition arose from the forced relocation of residents, often to less comfortable, remote districts of Moscow.

Architects and urban planners have argued that demolishing such a large number of buildings is environmentally unsustainable. They contend that replacing them with closely spaced, large high-rise towers will lead to over-densification, degrading the urban environment by reducing sunlight, airflow, and green spaces. Critics highlight that the so-called "human anthills" built as replacements are not constructed in any developed country. The environmental organization Greenpeace estimated that areas undergoing demolition could lose up to 25% of their green spaces, including ecologically critical zones that purify urban air. Konstantin Yankauskas, a deputy in the Zyuzino District, noted that increasing population density in already overcrowded Moscow would further strain social and transportation infrastructure, potentially causing emergency power outages, long queues for kindergartens and schools, and additional hours spent in traffic.

An RBK Group survey indicated that most major developers were interested in the renovation program. Alexander Balobanov, an associate professor at the Institute of Social Sciences at Russian Presidential Academy of National Economy and Public Administration, suggested that "there are grounds to believe the construction and development sectors are a major driving force, a significant engine [of the program]."

== In Soviet culture ==
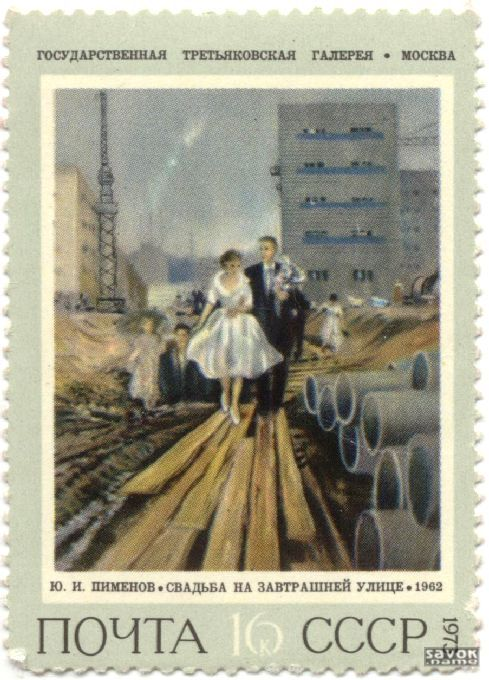
Stamp of Pimenov's "Wedding on Tomorrow Street"

In 1959, the comic operetta "Moscow, Cheryomushki" by Dmitri Shostakovich premiered, telling the story of a young couple and their friends moving into new apartments. The operetta gained popularity in the USSR, the West, and the U.S. Four years later, it was adapted into the film "Cheryomushki" by Herbert Rappaport. Writers praised the five-story buildings, including Anatoly Rybakov in The Adventures of Krosh. The satirical magazine Krokodil enthusiastically reported on construction progress in the late 1950s and published the poem New Cheryomushki by Vladimir Zakharovich Mass and Mikhail Abramovich Chervinsky, who also worked on the operetta and film. In painting, Yuri Pimenov's New Quarters series captured the spirit of the Khrushchev Thaw with works like The First Fashionistas of the New Quarter and Wedding on Tomorrow Street.

By the early 1960s, enthusiasm waned. In Aleksandr Andreev's novel Judge Us, People (1962), a foreman realizes he is building "tiny cells" and "kennels." After Khrushchev's removal and growing awareness of monotonous construction, Krokodil openly mocked Khrushchyovkas, and some plays depicted characters lost in identical-looking districts.

== See also ==
- Danchi, a similar Japanese low-cost housing
- Urban planning in communist countries
- Stalinist architecture
- Soviet bus stops, decentralized architectural experiments contrasting with mass housing
- Panelák and Sídlisko (Czech Republic and Slovakia)
- Large-panel-system building (Plattenbau, Germany)
- Panelház (Hungary)
- Million Programme (Sweden)
- Ugsarmal bair (Mongolia)
- Affordable housing
- Public housing
- Subsidized housing
- Tower blocks, a similar public housing project constructed in the United Kingdom
- Brutalist architecture

== Sources ==
- Elizarov, V.D.; Medvedeva, M.I. (1961). Крупнопанельное жилищное строительство [Large-Panel Housing Construction] (in Russian). Kyiv: Gosstroiizdat UkrSSR.
- Kolotilkin, B. M. (1961). Экономика крупнопанельного и крупноблочного строительства [Economics of Large-Panel and Large-Block Construction] (in Russian). Moscow: Gosstroiizdat.
- Meuser, Philipp & Zadorin, Dimitrij (2015). Towards a Typology of Soviet Mass Housing: Prefabrication in the USSR 1955–1991. Berlin: DOM publishers. ISBN 978-3-86922-446-6.
- Meuser, Philipp (2019). Prefabricated Housing. Construction and Design Manual. Berlin: DOM publishers. ISBN 978-3-86922-021-5.
- Promyslov, V.F. (1967). Развитие индустриального строительства в Москве [Development of industrial construction in Moscow] (in Russian). Moscow: Stroyizdat.
- Rudakov, P. G.; Fyodorov, E. P. (1964). Городское жилищное строительство : Опыт применения типовых проектов [Urban Housing Construction: Experience in Using Standard Designs] (in Russian). Moscow: Stroyizdat.
- Shaburnnikov, V.N. (1962). Крупнопанельное домостроение (из опыта строительства в Челябинске) [Large-panel construction (from the construction experience in Chelyabinsk)] (in Russian). Moscow: State publishing house of literature on construction, architecture and construction materials.
