= Housing construction in the Soviet Union =

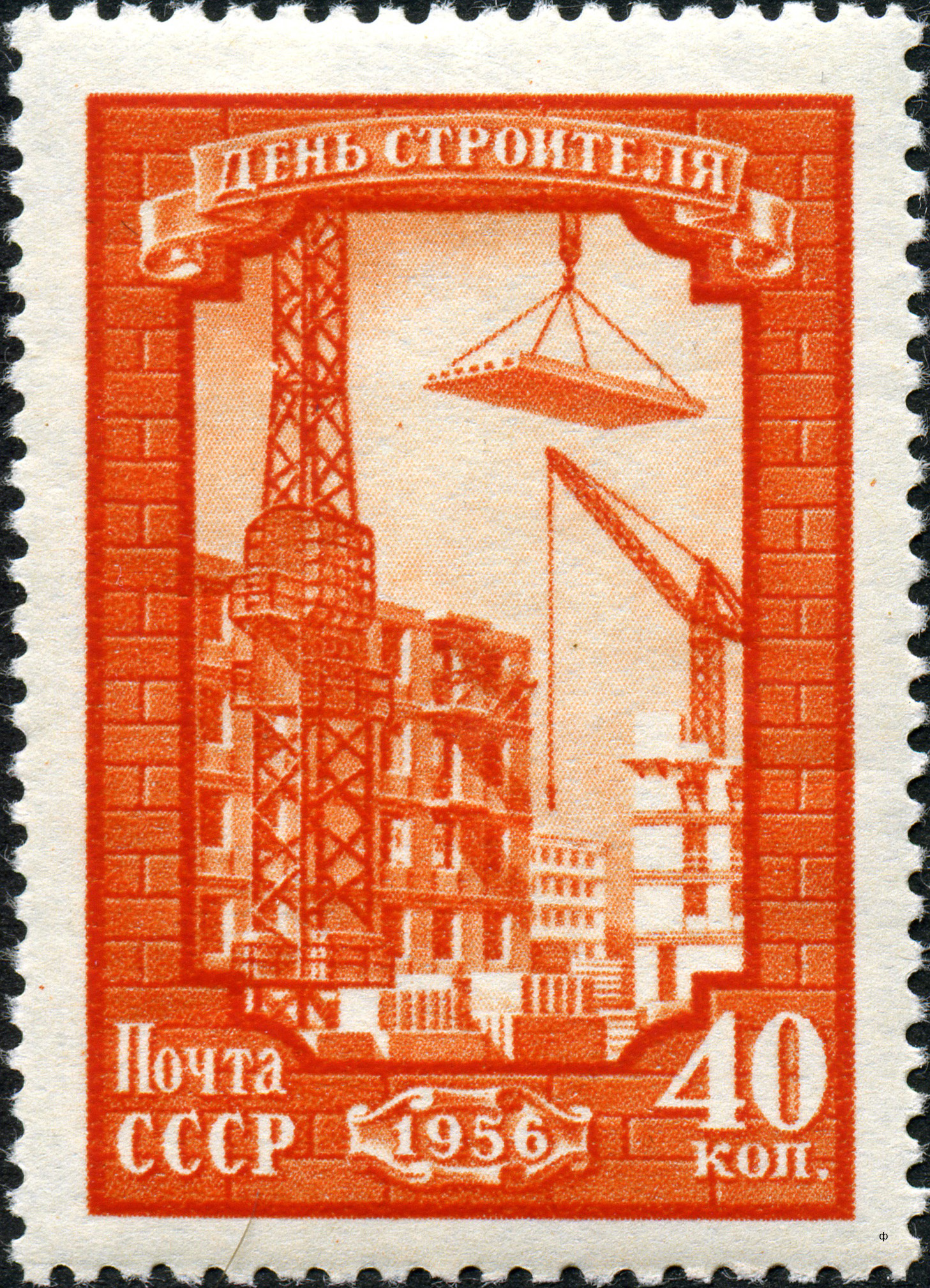
Soviet postage stamp, 1956. Dedicated to Builder's Day . The image shows the construction of large-block residential buildings, common in the 1950s, using tower cranes.

Housing construction in the Soviet Union was one of the most important sectors of the Soviet national economy and was based on socialist principles.

== Overview ==
The state was the primary builder, but during the New Economic Policy (NEP) period, 70–80% of housing was built privately. In the post-war years, up to a quarter of new housing was constructed individually, financed by loans provided to the population by Savings Bank of the USSR (Sberbank).

Some housing problems were inherited by Soviet Russia from the Tsarist era, while others arose due to the economic crisis, the revolution, and the World War and Russian Civil War. During the Civil War, when new construction was impossible, the focus shifted to the policy of "housing redistribution," meaning resettlement and densification. At the same time, debates emerged about the socialist city and socialist housing. A significant chapter in Soviet architectural history was the development of garden cities, communal houses, residential complexes, and socialist cities. In the early 1930s, with a shift in political trends, avant-garde architecture was banned, along with residential projects featuring communal living, which were labeled as "leftist excesses." This marked the beginning of the Stalinist architectural period.

During the industrialization of the USSR, priority was given to industrial construction, resulting in low housing construction volumes, with a significant share consisting of temporary housing.

The already severe housing crisis worsened after World War II. To address it, a mass housing construction program was launched under Nikita Khrushchev in the late 1950s, leading to the development of so-called "Khrushchyovkas." Soviet architecture also saw a return to modernism. The new buildings were extremely simple, cheap, and functional, constructed according to standard designs, typically five stories high. From the early 1960s until the USSR's dissolution, Soviet housing construction was highly industrialized, with most buildings made of prefabricated reinforced concrete panels, which significantly simplified and reduced costs. For even greater savings, taller buildings with nine or more stories became more common. However, this resulted in the monotonous and uniform appearance of Soviet cities.

In the late 1950s, for the first time in Soviet history, the average living space per person significantly increased. As a result of mass standardized construction, millions of Soviet citizens received their own well-equipped apartments, moving out of barracks and communal housing.

== State of Russian housing stock on the eve of the revolution ==
According to Sergey Kamolov, the housing issue in its modern sense emerged in Russia after the reforms of the 1860s, which were associated with the abolition of serfdom, economic, and social modernization.

A study published in 2007 by statistician Vasiliy Simchera, titled The Development of the Russian Economy Over 100 Years: 1900–2000. Historical Series, Century-Long Trends, Periodic Cycles, stated:

By the beginning of the century (1910), Russia had 1,179 cities, with a predominant prevalence of wooden and mixed-material buildings.

…

At the start of the 20th century, urban housing amounted to only 50 million m², with 7.1 m² per person; by 1917, this had increased to 126 million m² and 8.2 m² per person.

The Great Medical Encyclopedia, published in the Soviet Union in 1935, stated:

According to expert assessments of the overall state of housing and communal services in Tsarist Russia within its former borders, urban residential buildings comprised only about 2 billion m³ (including commercial premises within residential buildings), while the actual residential space was approximately 220 million m².

The anniversary collection The National Economy of the USSR Over 70 Years reported:

In 1913, the urban housing stock in pre-revolutionary Russia amounted to 180 million m² of total area. On average, each urban resident had 6.3 m² of housing space, taking into account the mansions of the bourgeoisie. However, at that time, 43% of working-class families rented a corner or shared a single bed, and about 70% of single workers rented half a bed, a bed, or just a corner.

Similar statistics were presented in earlier collections. For instance, according to The National Economy of the USSR for 1913–1956, the urban housing stock of the Russian Empire in 1913 totaled 180 million m², of which 133 million m² was residential space. According to Lyudmila Grudtsyna, in 1913, the average living space per person in Russian cities was 4.5 m², though "actual statistics" indicated a much worse situation. Due to the agrarian economic structure of pre-revolutionary Russia, 82% of the population lived in rural areas, usually in privately owned, low-rise wooden houses (izba) without basic amenities. In major cities, a significant portion of housing consisted of barracks, basements, semi-basements, dormitory-style rooms, dugouts, and semi-dugouts. For example, in Moscow in the 1910s, 327,000 people (the so-called "black tenants") lived in dormitory-style accommodations, accounting for more than 20% of the city's population. The living conditions there were often unbearable:

"The air is stifling due to overcrowding (15 people). The apartment is damp and incredibly dirty. The two small rooms are in complete darkness. The ceiling is so low that a tall person cannot stand upright. There is a distinct odor.

…

The apartment is in a terrible state: the plaster has crumbled, and the walls have holes stuffed with rags. It's filthy. The stove has collapsed. Legions of cockroaches and bedbugs. No second window frames, so it's bitterly cold."

— Inspection of dormitory-style apartments conducted by the Moscow City Administration in 1899.

Many of those living in such conditions were seasonal workers who had just arrived from the countryside and lacked connections within migrant communities, as well as single, often alcoholic individuals. They viewed their housing as temporary, which lowered their housing expectations. These dwellings were mainly located on the outskirts, while the city centers housed well-maintained districts occupied by wealthier social classes and profitable rental buildings. City governments did not engage in housing construction, leaving it entirely to private owners. Some factory owners built barracks and dormitories for workers, filling them with rows of beds. Such housing was used only for sleeping and short-term rest, as residents spent most of their time working.

The housing crisis worsened due to industrial development in the late 19th century and the resulting population migration to cities, followed by the effects of World War I. Housing construction ceased. In 1915, the government attempted to address the issue by imposing a rent freeze, but this only led landlords to stop maintaining and repairing buildings altogether.

== Housing redistribution ==
Partly, the housing problems were inherited by Soviet Russia from the tsarist era, and partly, they were caused by new upheavals. The new government faced the task of developing a new housing policy that would not only resolve the housing crisis but also align settlement patterns with socialist principles. The measures were dictated by ideology: a class-based approach, the nationalization of property, the "expropriation of the expropriators," and the elimination of the capitalist economic system as a whole. The need to relocate workers from overcrowded dwellings into expropriated apartments of the wealthy had been discussed long before the Bolsheviks. Friedrich Engels wrote about this in his work The Housing Question.

In his article Can the Bolsheviks Retain State Power?, published in 1917 on the eve of the October Revolution, Lenin wrote:

The proletarian state has to forcibly move a very poor family into a rich man's flat. Let us suppose that our squad of workers' militia is fifteen strong; two sailors, two soldiers, two class-conscious workers (of whom, let us suppose, only one is a member of our Party, or a sympathiser), one intellectual, and eight from the poor working people, of whom at least five must be women, domestic servants, unskilled labourers, and so forth. The squad arrives at the rich man's flat, inspects it and finds that it consists of five rooms occupied by two men and two women—"You must squeeze up a bit into two rooms this winter, citizens, and prepare two rooms for two families now living in cellars. Until the time, with the aid of engineers (you are an engineer, aren't you?), we have built good dwellings for everybody, you will have to squeeze up a little. Your telephone will serve ten families. This will save a hundred hours of work wasted on shopping, and so forth. Now in your family there are two unemployed persons who can perform light work: a citizeness fifty-five years of age and a citizen fourteen years of age. They will be on duty for three hours a day supervising the proper distribution of provisions for ten families and keeping the necessary account of this. The student citizen in our squad will now write out this state order in two copies and you will be kind enough to give us a signed declaration that you will faithfully carry it out.

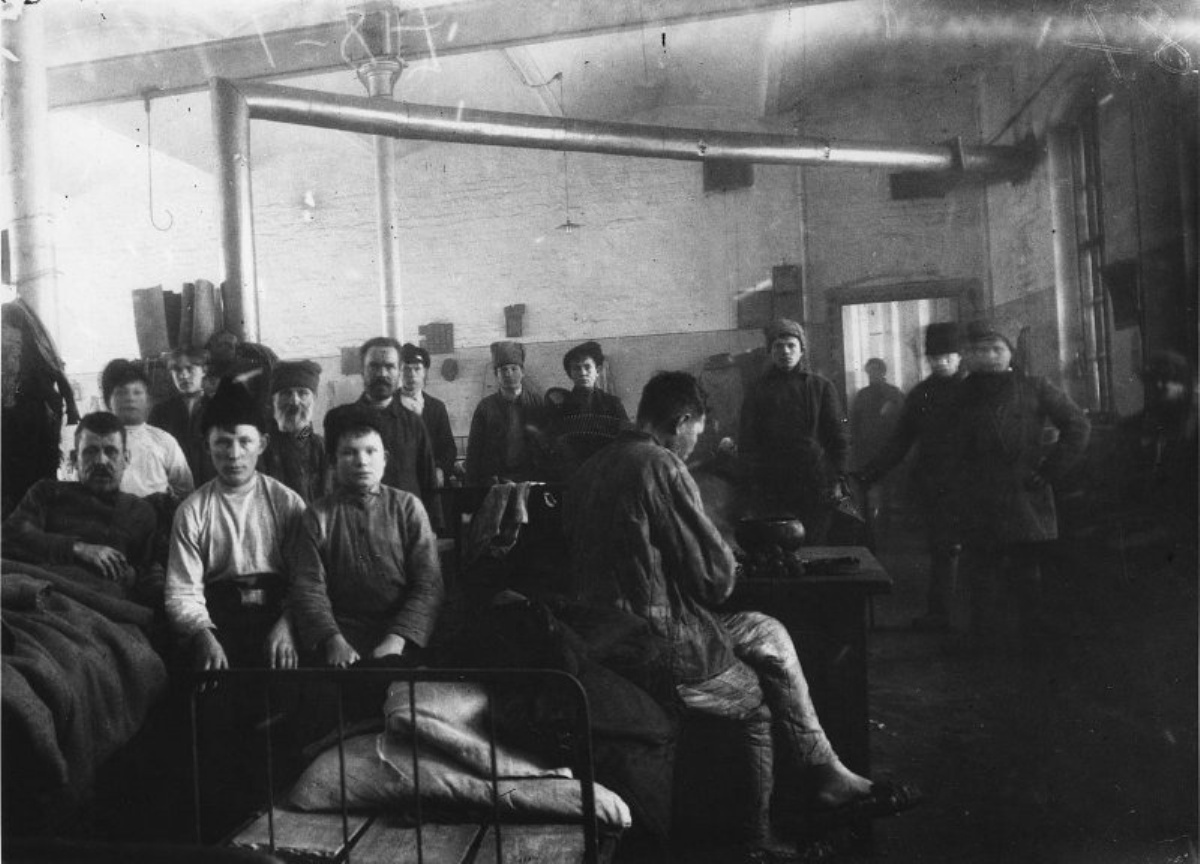
Men's dormitory at the Butikov factory in Moscow. 1918

Lenin continued these ideas in his supplement On the Requisition of Apartments of the Wealthy to Ease the Hardships of the Poor to the Petrograd Soviet's decree On the Requisition of Warm Clothing for Soldiers at the Front. On October 30, 1917, the NKVD issued a resolution On the Rights of Municipal Governments in Regulating the Housing Issue:

1. Municipal governments have the right to requisition all vacant premises suitable for housing.
2. Municipal governments have the right to move citizens in need of housing into available apartments or relocate those living in overcrowded or unhealthy conditions.
3. Municipal governments have the right to establish a housing inspection service, define its organization and responsibilities.
4. Municipal governments have the right to issue mandatory regulations for the creation of house committees, determine their structure and powers, and grant them legal entity status.
5. Municipal governments have the right to establish housing courts, define their jurisdiction, organization, and authority.
6. This resolution shall be enacted immediately via telegraph.

— People's Commissar for Internal Affairs, Alexei Rykov

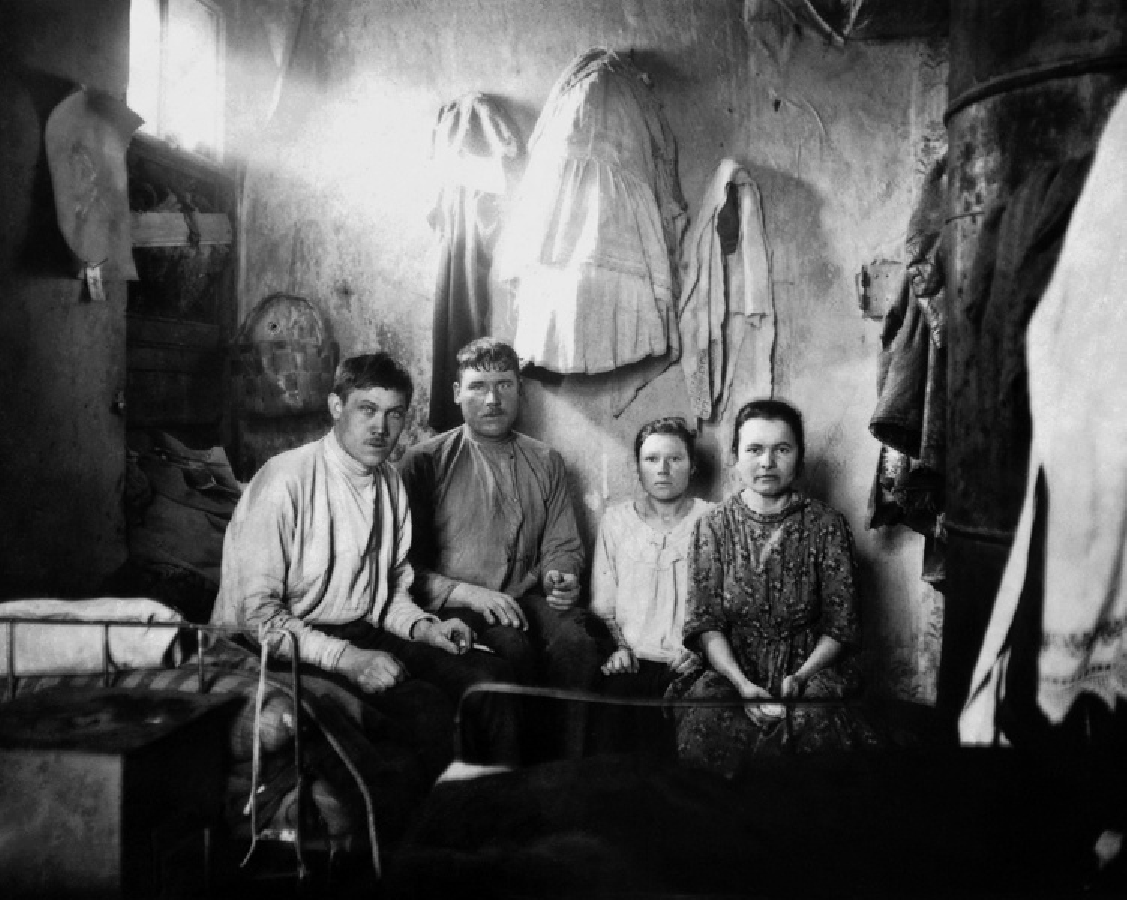
Two families of confectionery factory workers rent a "corner" in a room. Petrograd. 1920-1923

This resolution, along with the decrees of the All-Russian Central Executive Committee (VTSIK) and the Council of People's Commissars (SNK) of 1917–1918 (On the Abolition of Private Property in Urban Real Estate, On the Abolition of Private Property in Urban Housing), radically changed property ownership in housing and set the direction of housing policy for decades. All urban residential buildings, except those considered necessary property of industrial enterprises, were subject to municipalization, while industrial housing was to be nationalized. The right to construct housing in cities with populations over 10,000 was granted exclusively to local councils. However, state-led construction of new residential buildings only began in 1919–1920, and in the first years, the scale was negligible. Existing buildings were barely maintained, as the hardships of the Civil War, lack of funds, a shortage of skilled workers, and primitive construction tools took their toll.

Given the impossibility of mass construction, the government relied on the policy of housing redistribution, meaning forced or voluntary resettlement and uplotnenie ("compaction") , which began on a large scale in the fall of 1918. Workers were moved into expropriated "bourgeois apartments," which aimed to reduce the gap in living standards between the rich and poor and ensure a more even population distribution in cities. In practice, former owners were either evicted or forced to share their apartments with new residents. Lenin personally defined a "wealthy apartment" as one where the number of rooms equaled or exceeded the number of residents. However, since bourgeois apartments often had very large rooms (25 m² or more), it was deemed inefficient to allocate a single person per room. Authorities instead used living space per person as a metric. In 1918, the first national housing standard was set at 10 m² per adult and child under two years old, and 5 m² for children aged 2–12. However, due to severe housing shortages, these norms were repeatedly revised. In 1919, the People’s Commissariat of Health (Narkomzdrav) calculated the necessary air volume for restful sleep (25–30 m³) and set the minimum living space per person at 8–8.25 m². This standard is mentioned in Mikhail Bulgakov's novella Heart of a Dog, which describes the compaction process. Other sources mention an instruction from Narkomzdrav suggesting a 9 m² minimum. According to Mark Meerovich, from 1920 to 1926, this standard fluctuated between 9.3 m² and 5.3 m² in Moscow alone, where overcrowding was particularly severe. By 1920–1921, urban planning competitions even included projects with lower air volume requirements than those set by Narkomzdrav, corresponding to just 6.83 m² per person. To accommodate more people, large rooms were either subdivided or densely populated. As a result, entire families often lived in a single room, marking the beginning of Soviet kommunalki (communal apartments). While communal living existed before the Revolution, under the Bolsheviks, it became an official state policy. Unlike pre-revolutionary communal apartments, Soviet kommunalki housed people of vastly different cultural, social, and financial backgrounds.

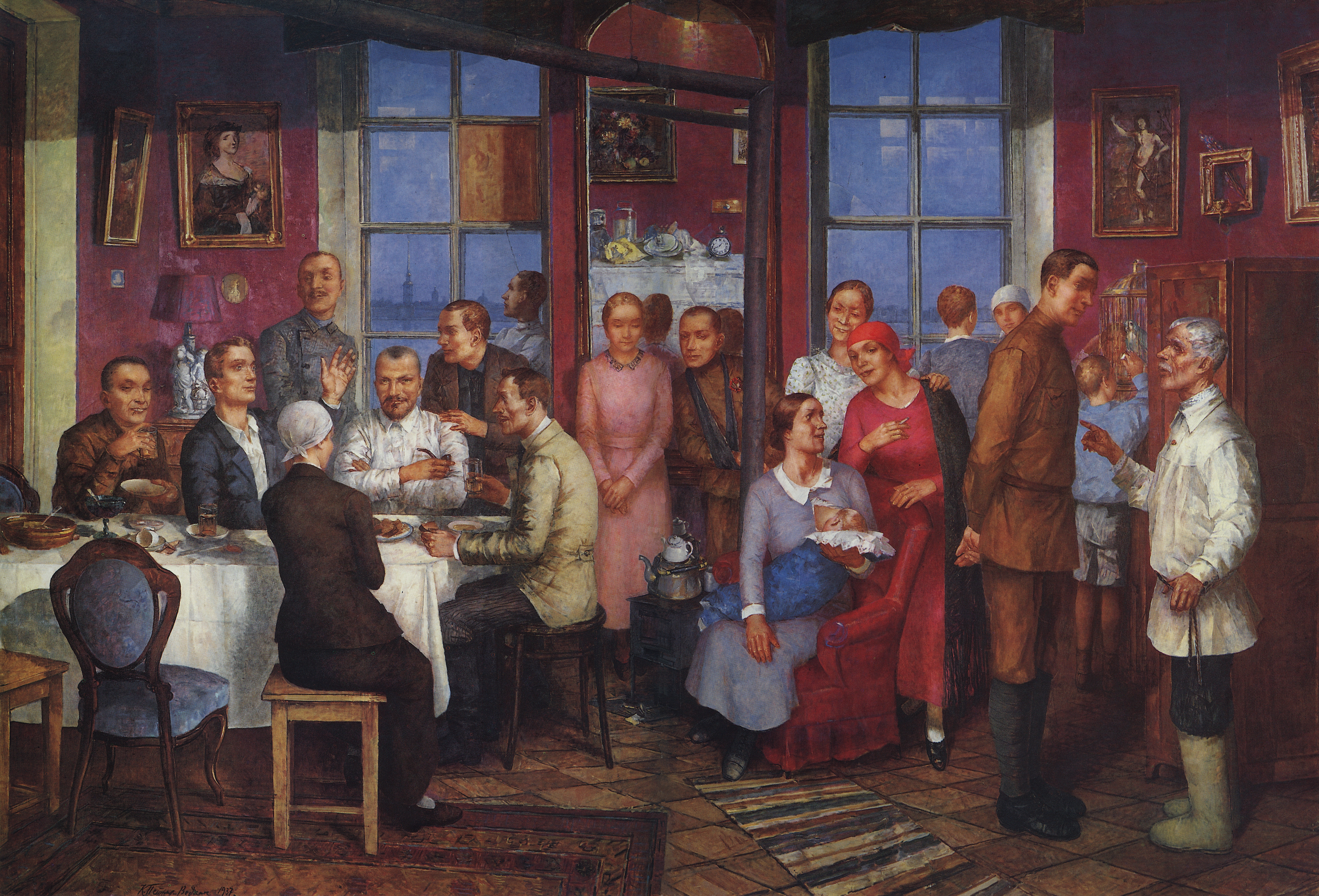
Kuzma Petrov-Vodkin. "Housewarming". 1937. The painting is dedicated to the resettlement of workers' families into the apartments of "former people"

Naturally, forced resettlement of the poor into existing apartments caused dissatisfaction among the original residents. Housing departments were flooded with complaints about new tenants damaging furniture, floors, and partitions, often burning them for heating. Many new tenants themselves refused to move into unfamiliar apartments due to higher heating costs, transportation difficulties, and reluctance to break established community ties. Intellectuals often argued that they needed solitude for their work and sometimes demanded a separate room. Authorities also faced resistance from health institutions, fearing the spread of infectious diseases.

According to S. O. Khan-Magomedov, the number of overcrowded apartments in Moscow decreased from 62% in 1912 to 23% in 1923. In Budgets of Workers and Employees at the Beginning of 1923, economist G. S. Pollyak stated that by 1923, there were almost no recorded cases of people renting a corner or a bed space, and the percentage of those with private rooms had increased by 2–2.5 times compared to the pre-revolutionary period. While the housing crisis persisted, many poor workers saw an improvement in their living conditions. As a result of housing redistribution, large industrial cities developed significant segments of communal housing. The number of workers living in city centers increased dramatically: in Moscow, the proportion of workers within the Garden Ring rose from 5% in 1917 to 40–50% by 1920. However, due to transportation difficulties—since many enterprises were outside the city center—this percentage later declined slightly.

An experimental system for managing state-owned housing emerged, ranging from collective self-governance to the appointment of state-sanctioned house committees (domkoms). In the early Soviet years, workers were exempt from rent payments, leading to rapid deterioration of housing stock, as local councils lacked funds for maintenance. By the end of 1920, nearly a third of Moscow's housing stock was reportedly uninhabitable.

== "New Life" ==
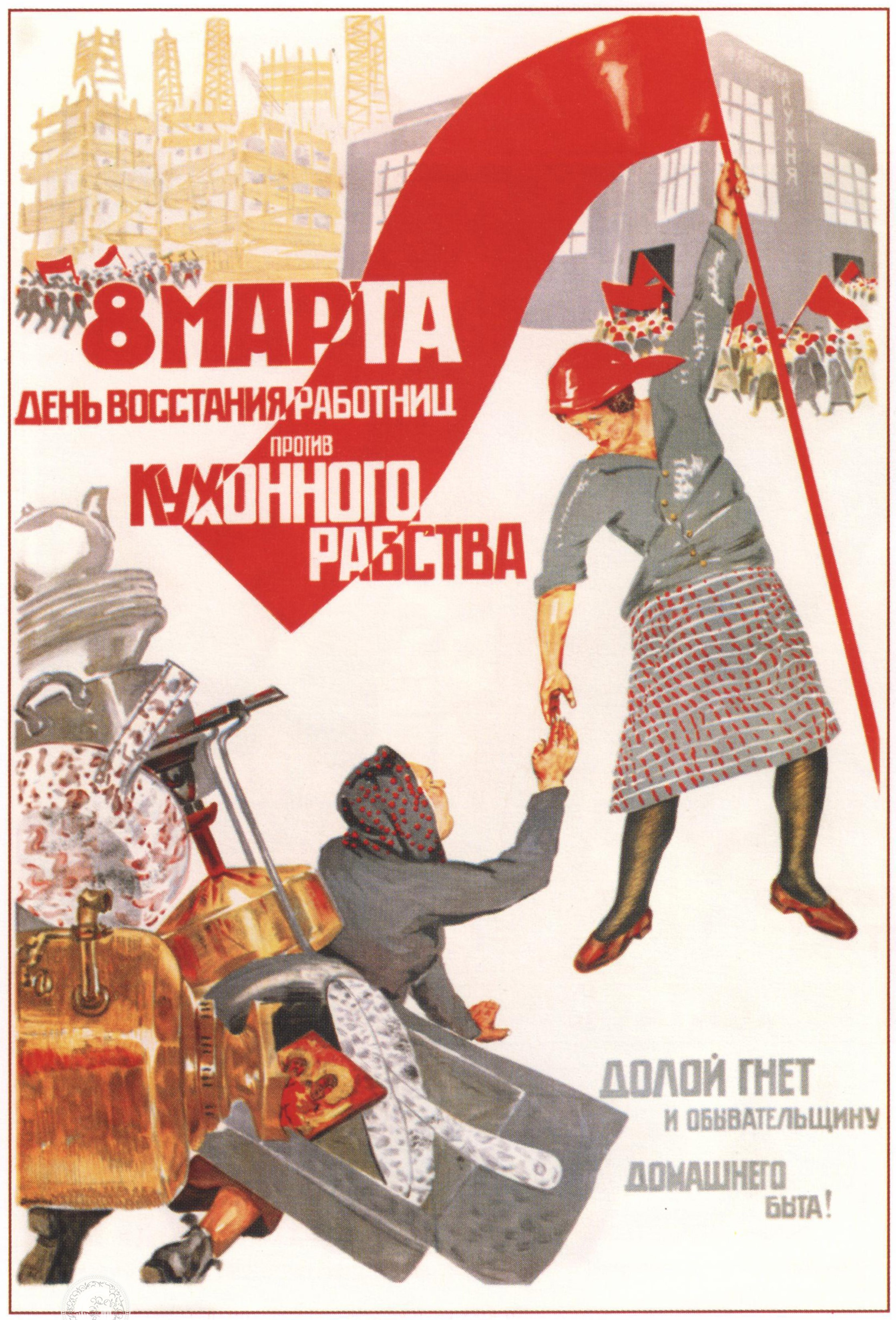
Propaganda poster "March 8th is the day of the workers' rebellion against kitchen slavery! Down with the oppression and pettiness of domestic life!"

The familiar dwelling seemed an outdated relic to many on the left:

…everyone does their own laundry, procures their own books and newspapers, runs to the shop with a ration book, finds tickets to the theater, raises their children according to their own amateurish methods of pedagogy—in short, they live for themselves and take care of themselves. Moving into these new houses, people bring with them not only bedbugs in their mattresses and greasy kitchen pots but also the ability to continue their old way of life without restriction. The man "himself" earns the family's bread, the housewife cooks the food, washes the laundry, shoves the children aside with cuffs to keep them from interfering with work, and the kids run wild in the yard, inventing games like "speculator and militia," smoking, swearing, and acting up. Nothing in this backwardness has anything to do with socialism… — A. Sklonsky, Socialist City in Revolution and Culture magazine

Adherents of socialist utopias saw the failures of "communist" settlements as a result of being rejected by the capitalist society that surrounded them. A large-scale practical experiment was needed, one that could take place in conditions free from a hostile environment. This became possible after the formation of the RSFSR in October 1917—the world's first socialist state. From its earliest years, Bolshevik authorities and their supporters spoke of the necessity of a socialist "restructuring of daily life," the creation of a "new way of life." These concepts were interpreted differently in the 1920s. Sometimes, they simply referred to an increase in housing comfort. Occasionally, the "new way of life" was even envisioned as an isolated, self-sufficient household. However, a more radical understanding of the "new way of life" was based on the following principles:

- A new type of family relations in everyday life, including the rejection of the family's role as an economic unit. For architecture, this meant freeing the housing unit from many household functions.
- The primary unit of society was no longer the family but the communal collective. In architectural terms, this meant that instead of creating houses from autonomous living units, residential complexes and cities should be formed from autonomous living quarters designed for collectives with more complex functional processes, necessitating a different spatial and material structure.
- Fundamentally different relationships within the new communal collective: self-service, consumer cooperation, communal ownership of household items, and new forms of social interaction at the scale of the new primary collective.

This approach was most consistently articulated in the theoretical works of architect N. S. Kuzmin. In Kuzmin’s concept, which was supported by the leadership of the Association of Contemporary Architects (OSA), the idea of the family's gradual dissolution was put forward, along with strict regulation of commune members' lives, while the apartment was declared a material embodiment of petty-bourgeois ideology. Anatoly Lunacharsky wrote:

…our task is to destroy domestic housekeeping… True, complete, ultimate liberation lies in the socialization of everyday life, a path we are embarking on slowly, gradually, within our means—by organizing public laundries, communal dining, and collective childcare. — Anatoly Lunacharsky, On Everyday Life (Leningrad: State Publishing House, 1927)

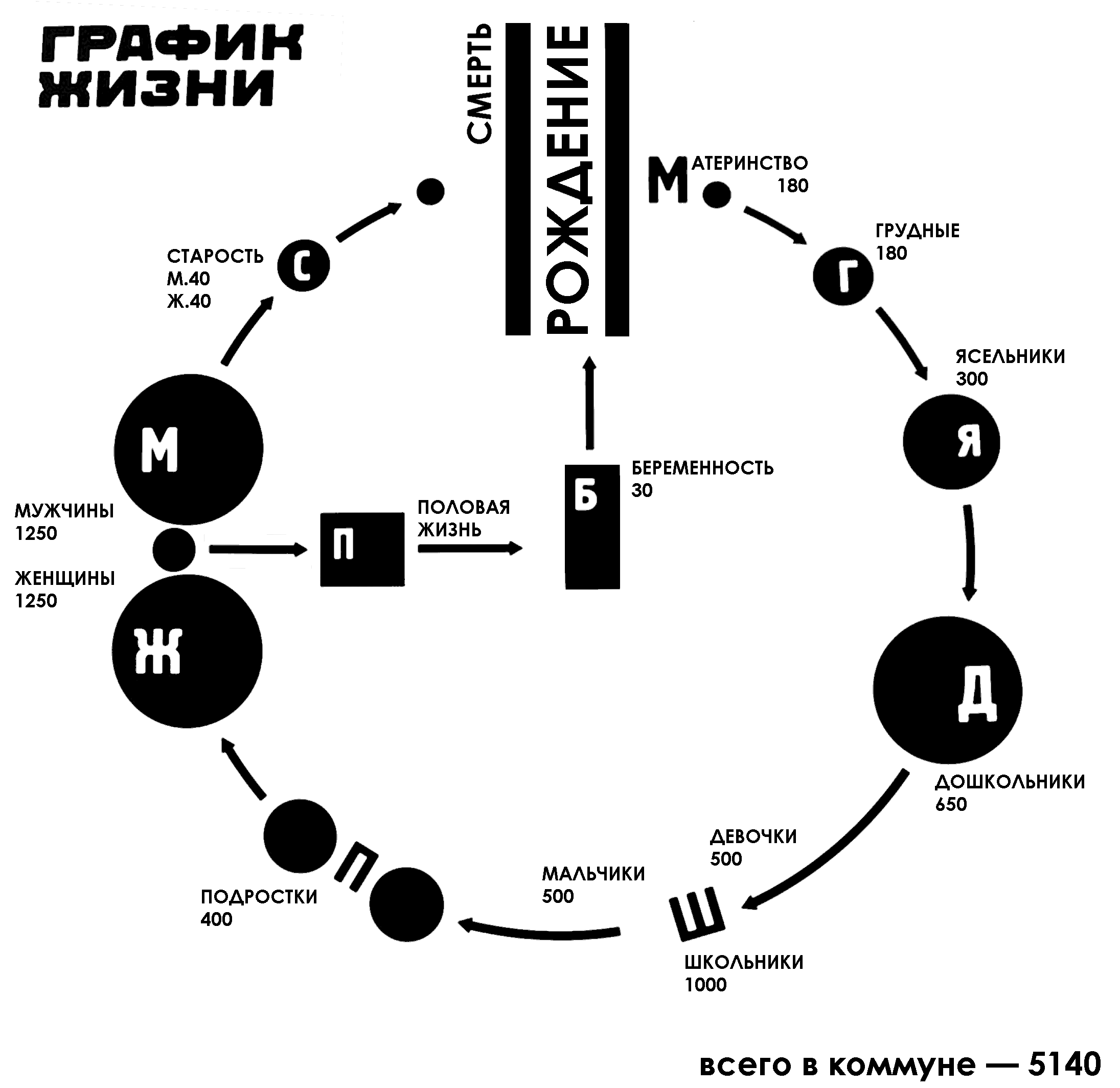
N. S. Kuzmin. "Life schedule" of the housing complex of the Anzhero-Sudzhensk coal region. 1928-1929.

Vladimir Lenin considered "steadfast, systematic measures toward the transition to communal dining and the replacement of individual housekeeping with collective food provision for large groups of families" one of the conditions for strengthening Soviet power. He placed particular emphasis on freeing women from household drudgery—the "foul kitchens"—and redirecting them toward public production:

Women continue to be domestic slaves despite all emancipation laws, for they are crushed, stifled, dulled, and demeaned by small-scale domestic labor, tied to the kitchen and childcare, their work wasted on monstrously unproductive, petty, exhausting, and degrading tasks. True emancipation of women, true communism, will only begin where and when this small-scale domestic economy is massively restructured into large-scale socialist production. — V. Lenin, The Great Initiative, June 1919

While Lenin described the reconstruction of family household arrangements, he did not speak of reconstructing the family itself as the primary unit of society. Yet, in the debates of the 1920s, the question of family reconstruction was crucial. At times, there were even calls for the complete abolition of the family. However, it seems that the leader of the Revolution did not share the radicalism regarding the communalization of daily life: as early as 1902, he refused to join the Iskra commune in London, agreeing with Nikolay Chernyshevsky that "everyone has a corner of life where no one should ever intrude."

After the Revolution, many sincerely believed that a "new man" was being born before their eyes—a selfless collectivist who rejected excessive domestic comfort as a relic of petty-bourgeois philistinism, embraced an ascetic lifestyle, and eagerly took on any labor for the benefit of society. They saw themselves as the vanguard of the new society. This vanguard formulated the social demand that guided architects in developing plans for socialist settlement and new types of housing. However, in the first post-revolutionary years, mass construction of new housing was impossible. Instead, old buildings were adapted into "communal dormitories" ("commune houses," "workers' houses," "collective houses") that embodied the ideals of the "new way of life." These dormitories were established both by authorities—attached to various enterprises and educational institutions—and spontaneously, not only by ideological enthusiasts but also out of sheer poverty. They primarily housed people united by a common cause. The state encouraged the creation of communal dormitories, and they became widespread. For instance, in 1923, over 40% of young workers in Moscow lived in 1,075 officially registered communes. In the early years of Soviet power, even the Party elite moved into communal housing, though naturally with greater comfort. These were called "Soviet Houses" or "Soviet Hotels" because they were often repurposed former hotels. They had private rooms but shared dining halls and kitchens. One example was the First House of Soviets, converted from the National Hotel, where senior officials of the RSFSR, including V. I. Lenin, lived.

Not only cities but also villages implemented ideas of communal living, sometimes taking them to extreme levels. Rural communards often collectivized not just all production but also all income and the entire process of consumption.

One of the first new housing constructions to embody the idea of "collective houses," albeit in a modest interpretation, was the temporary workers' barrack-style housing of 1919–1920. These had extensive shared facilities, including club-dining halls, dining-reading rooms, cloakrooms with drying areas, and communal washrooms.

== Search for new types of housing ==
The large-scale housing construction that began around 1924 in cities and suburbs finally allowed architects and urban planners to start implementing their ideas in practice. Even before the Revolution, housing types for workers varied widely: single-family homes, apartments, dormitories, barracks, etc. This entire typology was adopted by architects in the post-revolutionary years. However, the following main directions emerged in the pursuit of building a "new way of life":

- The first was based on Ebenezer Howard's garden city concept, featuring developments of individual houses.
- Supporters of the second approach placed their hopes on constructing communal housing complexes with fully collectivized living arrangements and well-developed service infrastructure.
- The third group included those who believed that communal housing would not be successful in the coming years due to the population’s "unpreparedness." They proposed developing a "transitional type of house" that would gradually introduce new forms of everyday life.
- Additionally, in the early post-revolutionary years, barracks were considered a temporary housing option for workers assigned (or mobilized) for specific tasks.

Housing construction between 1918 and 1928 was characterized by a technically underdeveloped production base. Construction relied on manual labor. The first machines began appearing on construction sites in 1924–1925, but they were simple devices—hoists, mortar and concrete mixers, and winches. Naturally, they could not significantly reduce the reliance on manual labor.

=== Low-rise workers' settlements ===
According to art historian V. E. Khazanova, Soviet residential architecture transitioned from the romanticism of projects from 1918–1921 to the projects of the 1920s, where economy, sanitation, hygiene, and utilitarianism took center stage. "Technology, economy, and hygiene"—this is how Alexey Shchusev defined the "most accurate slogans" of the era. Explanatory notes for new housing projects contained detailed calculations of materials, square meters, cubic meters, and construction profitability. Initially, the search for the most economical solutions led to the construction of low-rise wooden houses. Low-rise housing dominated design and construction in the first half of the 1920s. However, the majority of these were not workers’ homes but rather traditional estate-style houses financed by the middle-class urban population.

Garden cities had already intrigued Russian architects and urban planners before the Revolution, though the projects implemented at the time were far from Ebenezer Howard's ideas. After the Revolution, however, Howard’s supporters became convinced that the new socialist realities provided favorable conditions for creating true garden cities. The popularity of low-rise construction during these years was influenced by several socio-economic factors: population migration out of cities, the desire to establish personal household plots during the difficult famine years, NEP entrepreneurs investing in individual suburban housing, shortages of building materials, a lack of skilled labor and equipment for high-rise construction, and the influence of workers' settlements being built near power plants and industrial enterprises outside urban areas.

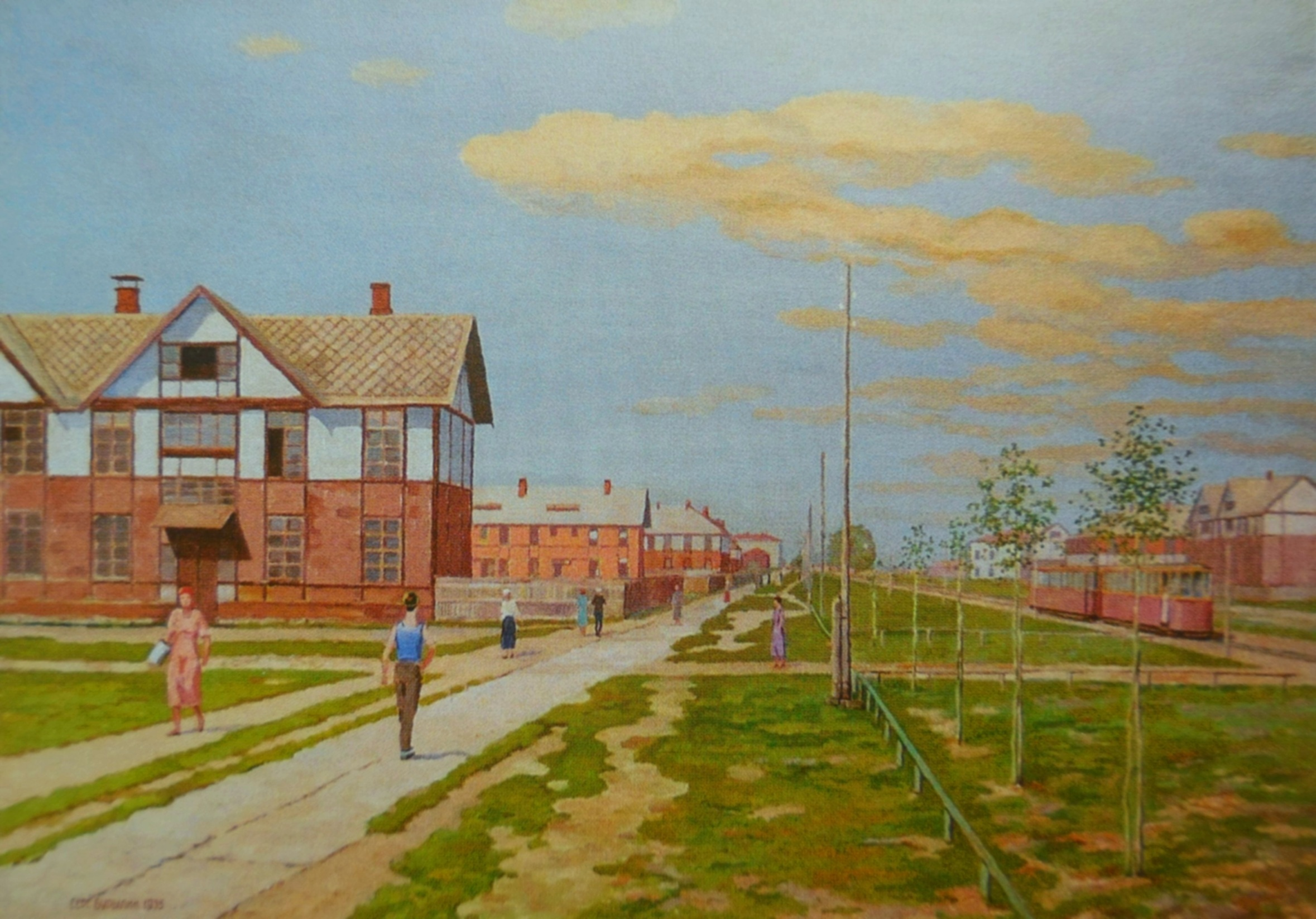
The First Workers' Settlement in Ivanovo

Extensive arguments in favor of the garden city concept and individual estate-style homes were presented in reports and articles by members of the "Society of Garden Cities," particularly Vladimir Semyonov. He believed that the relatively low level of urbanization in Russia would facilitate the development of garden cities. In Semyonov’s view, garden cities should merge the best aspects of urban and rural life, bridging the gap between them—a topic frequently discussed after the Revolution. Another major argument was the sanitary and hygienic benefits of garden cities. In this regard, designers were supported by doctors and hygienists who spoke in the press and at conferences, including Nikolai Semashko, A. V. Molkov, A. N. Sysin, I. G. Gelman, Z. P. Solovyov, and S. A. Gurevich. It was also emphasized that workers themselves aspired to own individual estate-style homes.

The initiative to build Soviet workers’ settlements, rooted in the garden city concept, came from government agencies, enterprises, and workers' cooperative associations. Their economic model functioned as follows: workers at a factory or plant would form a cooperative association and build a settlement near the enterprise (meaning that the Soviet workers’ settlement was characterized by the presence of an industrial core). The state provided land and funding on preferential terms. The cooperative, using collective ownership of land and buildings and accumulating enterprise profits, reinvested those profits into the settlement's development. Over time, cooperative members could purchase property from the association.

Soviet workers’ settlements were intended to feature comfortable single-family homes with private plots for gardens, vegetable patches, and small livestock. However, services were to be collectivized, and elements of communal living were designed to prevent cottages from adopting a "petty-bourgeois sting." These ideas also resonated in the provinces. For instance, in 1925, the editorial board of Saratov News criticized an article on new housing construction for failing to address "such an essential issue as the need for the collectivization of daily life, without which women cannot be liberated from the kitchen and childcare."

The actual implementation of these projects often did not match the architects’ visions: land allocated for green spaces and sports grounds was instead used for storage sheds and poultry coops, and service infrastructure was not always fully developed. Opponents of the garden city concept argued that it was tied to capitalism and that individual housing had no place in a Soviet society based on collectivist principles, as cottages would "negatively influence workers' social psychology, instill petty-bourgeois ideology, and turn workers into small-scale property owners and philistines."

In many implemented projects, single-family cottages were not built; instead, apartment buildings were constructed. Some reports indicate that the majority of houses in these settlements were significantly downgraded: single-story, two-apartment homes lacking water supply and sewage systems were most common, followed by two-story, four-apartment buildings. However, even these houses proved to be relatively expensive. For example, residents of the First Workers' Settlement in Ivanovo complained that their rent was higher than that of the nearby 400-apartment communal building.

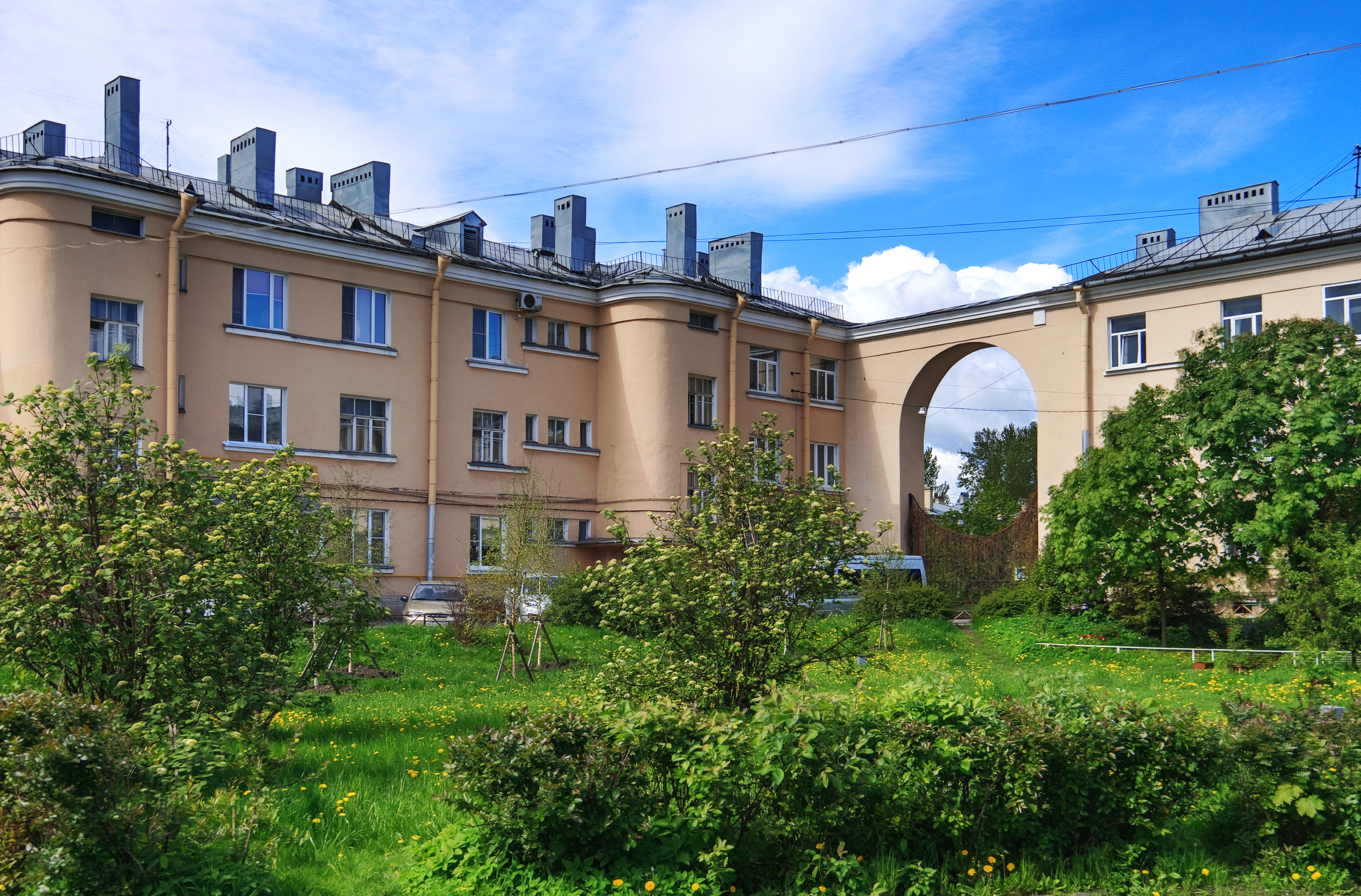
Serafimovsky section in Leningrad

Like their pre-revolutionary predecessors, Soviet workers’ settlements ultimately differed significantly from Ebenezer Howard’s original garden city concept.

=== Apartment buildings and "transitional type" houses ===
By the late 1920s, estate-style housing had largely disappeared. It had lost government support (according to M. G. Meerovich, individual homes hindered the authorities from using housing as a means of controlling people), fallen out of favor with architects and urban planners, and was influenced by socio-economic factors. These included the shift of construction from suburban areas to urban districts amid a renewed rapid growth of the urban population and the inefficiency of individual housing construction. Gradually, estate-style housing was replaced first by row houses and then by multi-apartment sectional buildings and communal houses. A transitional example from settlement-style housing to multi-story residential complexes was the two-story communal housing in the Krasnaya Presnya district of Moscow, which included small front gardens and vegetable plots.

Apartments in sectional buildings typically consisted of two or three rooms (very rarely four). Some of the first urban residential complexes for workers, consisting of sectional buildings, were built in Leningrad (whose housing stock had shrunk by 17% due to war and suffered from the 1924 flood). These included the Krylovsky and Serafimovsky sections of the Moskovsko-Narvsky district (three- and four-story buildings) and the Palevsky residential complex (two- and three-story buildings). The design specifications for these projects explicitly stated that planners should "not pursue any utopian ideas of creating buildings radically different from existing residential houses." Gradually, the number of floors in planned buildings increased. By 1928, Moscow was already designing six-story buildings, despite hygienists at the time advocating for three- to four-story housing.

A common housing type in the 1920s was the "transitional house," which bridged traditional sectional apartment buildings and communal houses. These buildings combined family apartments with minimal individual living units and partial collectivization of household activities. However, even this type of traditional housing did not satisfy many architects. "It is not enough to patch up the old, to rebuild and adapt the existing by taking half-measures," wrote I. A. Fomin.

=== Communal houses ===
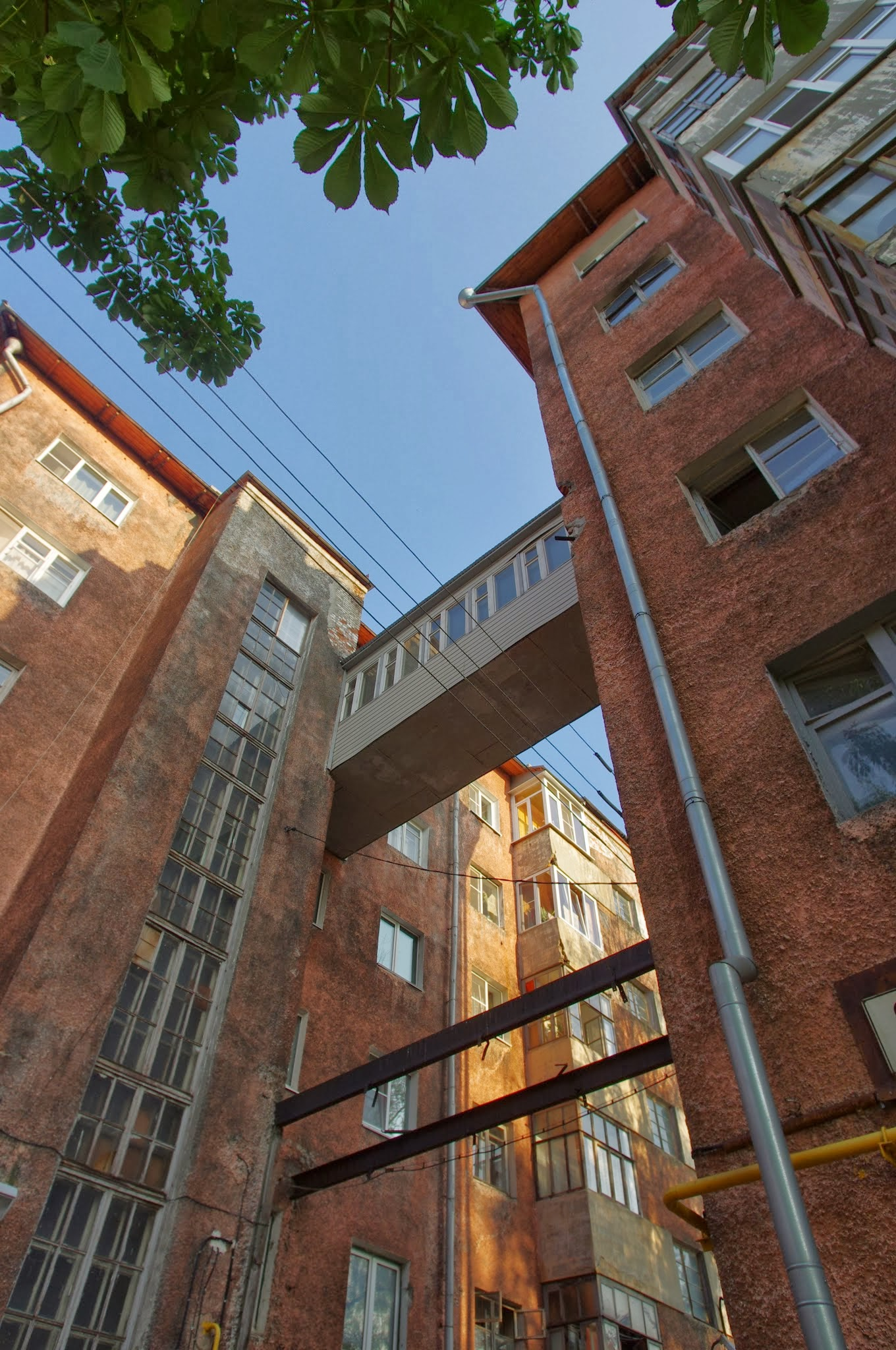
The "Cultural Revolution" communal house in Nizhny Novgorod

The creation of a new type of housing required finding answers to complex questions about human life: the nature of the family and its future, property, and the future of everyday life. The theorists and practitioners of the early post-revolutionary years, much like past utopians (e.g., Charles Fourier), saw communal houses as the foundation of the future communist way of life. In their view, communal houses were meant to foster "comradely closeness among all who lived in them." Shared laundries, kitchens, dining halls, children's rooms, community clubs, and common living spaces were to be designed according to the latest scientific advancements, freeing residents from "petty-bourgeois domestic concerns." Residents of communal houses would live in comfortable, water- and electricity-supplied rooms, replacing traditional family apartments. Rooms could be designed for individuals or shared by multiple people. In the most radical versions, individualization was only envisioned for rest and sleep.

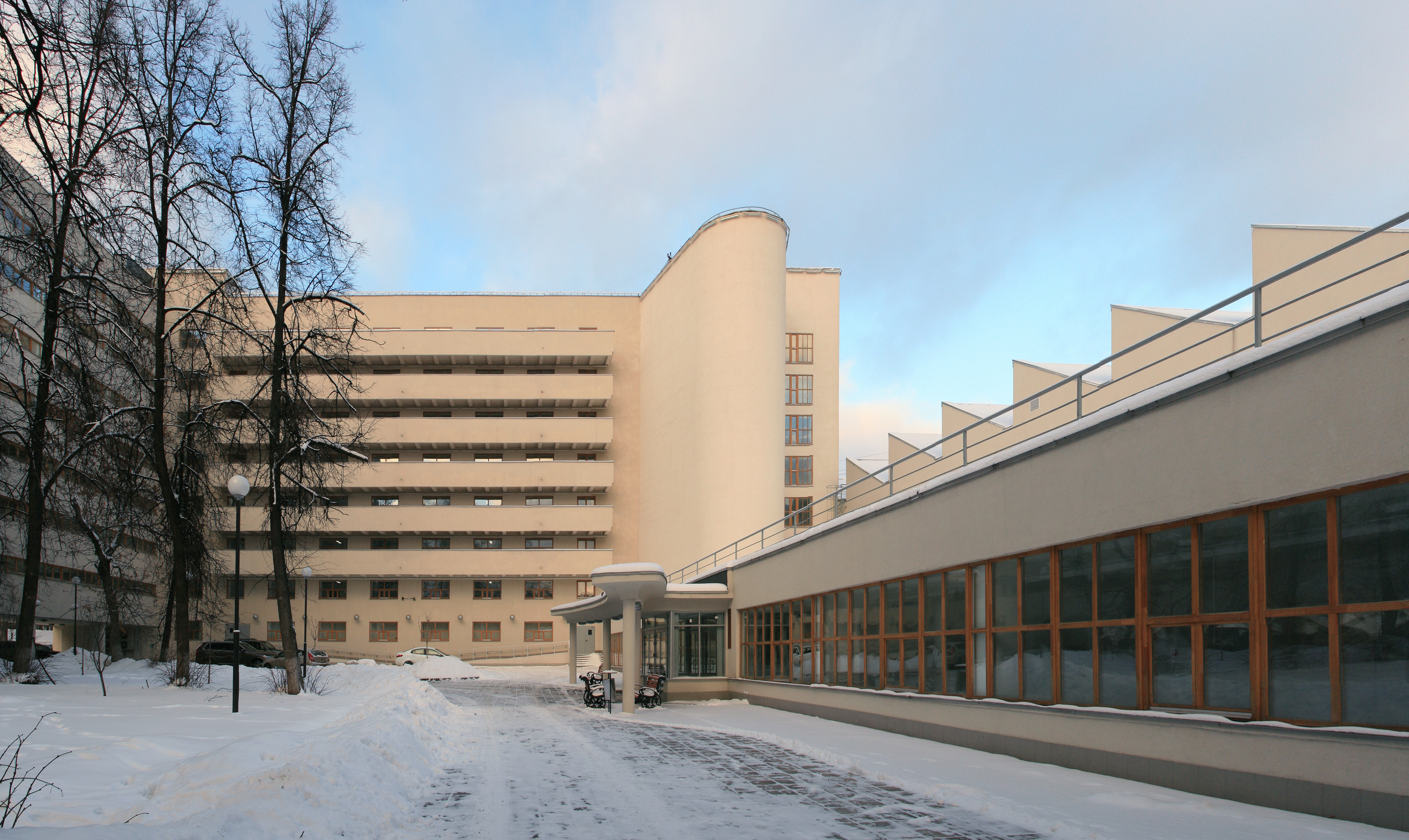
Communal house on Ordzhonikidze street in Moscow

The program for this new type of housing was developed through the study of workers’ and youth communes in old buildings. Experimental and competition-based projects played a significant role in this process. The first prototypes of communal houses appeared in designs from 1919–1920, such as those by N. A. Ladovsky, V. F. Krinsky, and G. M. Mapu in the Zhivskulptarkh group, as well as the previously mentioned temporary workers' housing. This was followed by a project by K. S. Melnikov, created for a 1922–1923 competition to design two model residential blocks for workers in Moscow. His design already featured key elements of future communal houses: an extensive communal section (including areas for dining, cultural recreation, child-rearing, and household needs), residential buildings with small individual units for single occupants (lacking kitchens or auxiliary rooms), covered walkways connecting residential and communal buildings, and a modern architectural style in the spirit of Soviet avant-garde.

In 1925, the Moscow Soviet announced a competition to design a communal house in Moscow for 750–800 residents. The plan anticipated that 10% of the inhabitants would be single individuals, 30% childless families, and 60% families with 3–5 members. The house’s population would be served by a communal dining hall, which would also function as a general assembly space. Cultural and leisure functions were represented by a library-reading room and a club. A kindergarten and nursery were located on the ground floor with easy access to an outdoor playground. A communal laundry was also included. The competition program excluded kitchens from family apartments. Only small warming stoves on each floor were provided for heating food for children and the sick. The rejection of private kitchens was a characteristic trend of the time, though it was also influenced by the high cost of equipping mass-built homes with gas or electricity for cooking.

From the late 1920s to the early 1930s, communal houses were designed and built across various parts of the Soviet Union for different social groups. After 1928, when housing cooperatives were allowed to allocate 5% of construction funds for cultural and domestic facilities, cooperatives began commissioning architects to design buildings with extensive communal sections ("transitional-type houses" and communal houses). In this way, cooperatives carried forward the tradition of collective living that had emerged during the period of War Communism. By this time, architectural thought was increasingly dominated by radical left-wing ideas about collectivized living. However, these ideas were never fully realized in communal houses.

Severe housing shortages led to overcrowding in these buildings, exceeding their planned capacities. Violations of their intended functionality—such as communal facilities not operating, public spaces being converted into residential areas, and buildings meant for singles or small households being occupied by families with children—made comfortable living in most of these houses impossible. Additionally, the long-term prospects of communal living had been overestimated. Architects and sociologists mistakenly viewed the lifestyles of youth communes in the 1920s as the beginnings of a new way of life. In reality, these communes were temporary, existing only while young people were studying and had not yet started families.

As time went on, communal housing projects faced increasing criticism from both the public and professionals. Critics argued that communal houses were an impractical "leap forward," as residents were not eager to collectivize their private lives. Attention was also drawn to the inefficiency of these projects, with their disproportionately large communal areas. Although some projects without individual apartments were shown to be economically viable compared to traditional residential buildings, by 1931, selection committees were unable to approve any of them as standard designs, since none of them were cheaper or at least equal in cost to conventional apartment buildings.

According to architect S. O. Khan-Magomedov, none of the social, domestic, or typological experiments in 1920s architecture—whether in communal houses or transitional-type housing—were ever fully realized. They were never properly tested for economic feasibility, the organization of communal services, or the application of new construction technologies.

The realities of communal living in the "House-Commune of Engineers and Writers"—mockingly nicknamed the "Tear of Socialism"—were recalled by poet and writer Olga Bergholz:

"We, a group of young (very young!) engineers and writers, collectively built this house in the early 1930s as part of a categorical struggle against 'old domestic life' (kitchens and diapers!). That’s why not a single apartment had a kitchen, or even a small cooking corner. There weren’t even coat racks in the apartments—there was a communal coat rack downstairs. On the first floor, there was a shared children's room and a communal lounge. Even before moving in, we had decided that we would rest only collectively, with no individualism whatsoever.

We moved into our house with enthusiasm, eagerly handing over our ration cards and 'obsolete' personal kitchenware to the communal kitchen—finally, we were liberated from cooking! We immediately formed countless committees and 'troikas'…

And yet, after a year or two, when rationing was abolished and we grew older, we realized we had rushed into this too quickly. We had collectivized our lives so completely that we left ourselves no room for even a tactical retreat… except for the windowsills. That’s where the first 'deserters' started cooking what they actually wanted to eat—because the communal dining hall could no longer satisfy the diverse tastes of the residents.

As for the diapers—there were more and more of them in the house, and it was a complete disaster: there was nowhere to dry them!

...

No, we will not give up our house. We love it. Not for its comforts—there aren’t many, and the inconveniences far outweigh them! We love it simply because it is ours, a part of our lives, our dreams, our ambitions—perhaps not always well thought out, but always sincere."

— Olga Bergholz, "Daytime Stars" (Moscow, 1967), pp. 43–45.

=== "New Housing Policy" ===
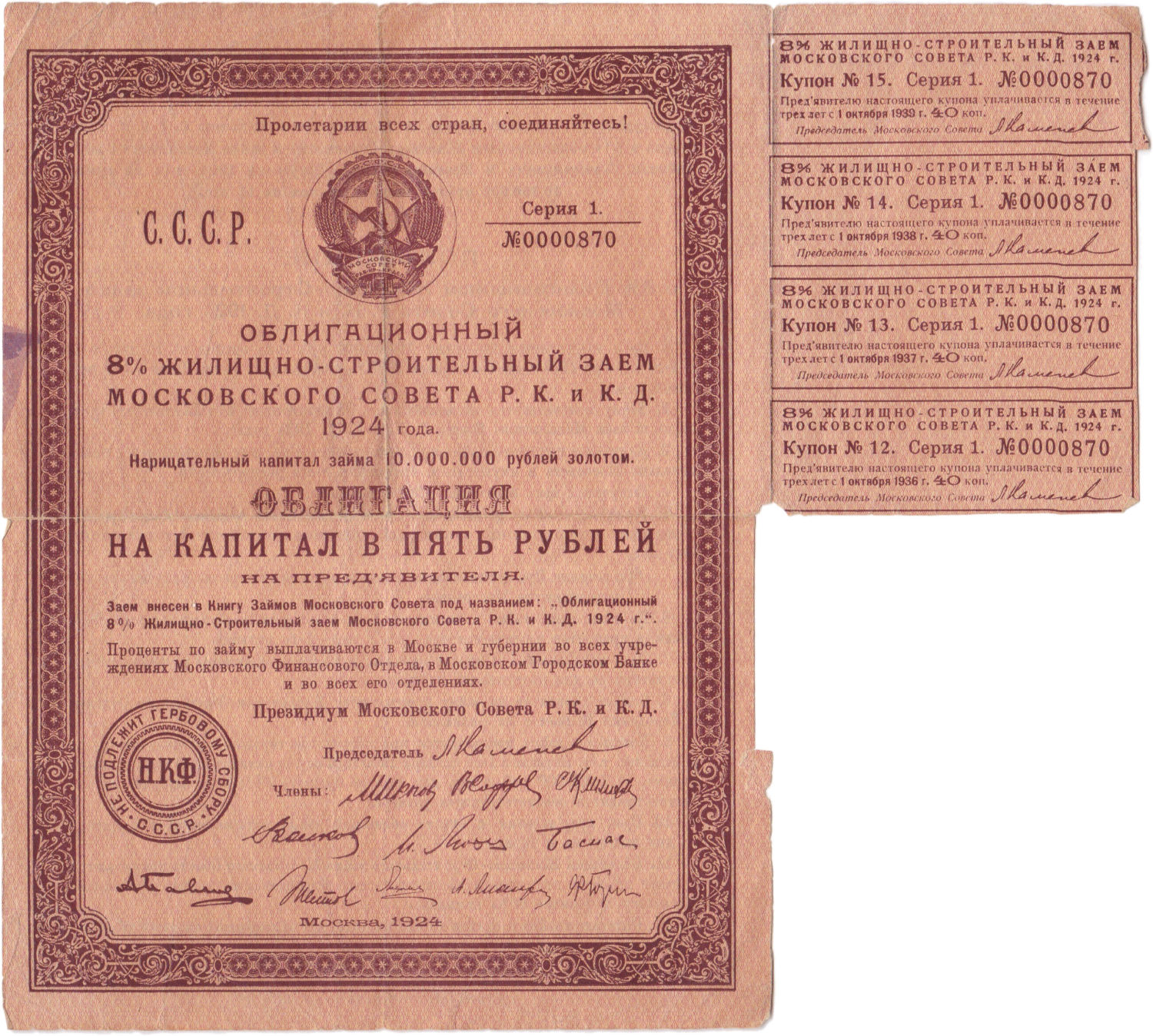
Housing and construction loan of the Moscow City Council. 1924.

The process of transferring housing into state ownership during the Civil War years proceeded slowly. For example, in Moscow at the beginning of 1919, out of 28,000 houses, only 4,500 had been nationalized. The authorities acknowledged that the municipalization of the entire housing stock was beyond their capabilities. By the start of the New Economic Policy (NEP), the policy of "housing redistribution" was effectively curtailed. In 1921, a "new housing policy" was launched. The majority of residential space was de-municipalized—either returned to previous owners or transferred to new ones. The state’s ability to provide housing remained limited. Rent collection from workers was reinstated.

With the end of the war and improving economic conditions, housing construction increased. With the adoption of the 1922 law "On the Right to Build," private construction took on a larger role. By the mid-1920s, 70-80% of housing was built privately. In 1924, cooperative housing ownership was legally recognized in the form of housing associations. Three types of associations were established: housing-rental cooperatives (ZHAKTs) for managing municipalized properties, workers' housing construction cooperatives (RZhSKTs) for building new homes and restoring destroyed ones, and general housing construction cooperatives (ZhSKTs) for artisans, small entrepreneurs, professionals, and skilled employees who could finance their own housing. The idea behind these cooperatives was not only to alleviate the housing crisis but also to "instill a sense of ownership in people, develop self-governance, and operate housing on a self-sustaining basis." Cooperative housing was relatively comfortable.

To stimulate housing construction, the Central Bank for Municipal and Housing Construction (Tsekombank) and a network of local municipal banks were established. Government assistance for private builders was also motivated by the need to curb unauthorized land seizures for individual construction. In the late 1920s and early 1930s, "self-densification" was practiced, where local authorities turned private apartments into communal housing. At the same time, municipalization of housing and evictions of "non-working elements," including NEPmen and clergy, resumed.

=== Statistics ===
According to official statistics, new construction, completion, and restoration of housing amounted to:

- 1923: 1.08 million m²
- 1924: 1.2 million m²
- 1925: 1.85 million m² (some sources say over 3 million m²)
- 1926: 3.23 million m²
- 1928: 4.89 million m²

In 1924, the average urban living space per person was 5.8 m². By 1926, census data showed an average of 5.9 m² per person (workers: 4.9 m², office employees: 6.9 m², other citizens: 6.1 m²). In Moscow, it was 5.2 m²; in provincial cities, 6.3 m². Conditions were worst in industrial centers, where space ranged from 1.5 to 4.5 m² per person. In 1926, a minimum standard of 6.3 m² per person was set for provincial cities. By 1928, the national housing norm had dropped to 5.53 m², prompting a policy shift encouraging private capital in housing construction.

Between 1923 and 1925, nearly 5.5 million m² of housing was built in cities and urban settlements. From 1923 to 1927, more than 12.5 million m² of residential space was constructed across the USSR. In 1928 alone, over 1 million m² of housing was built, mostly low-rise buildings.

== Industrialization era ==
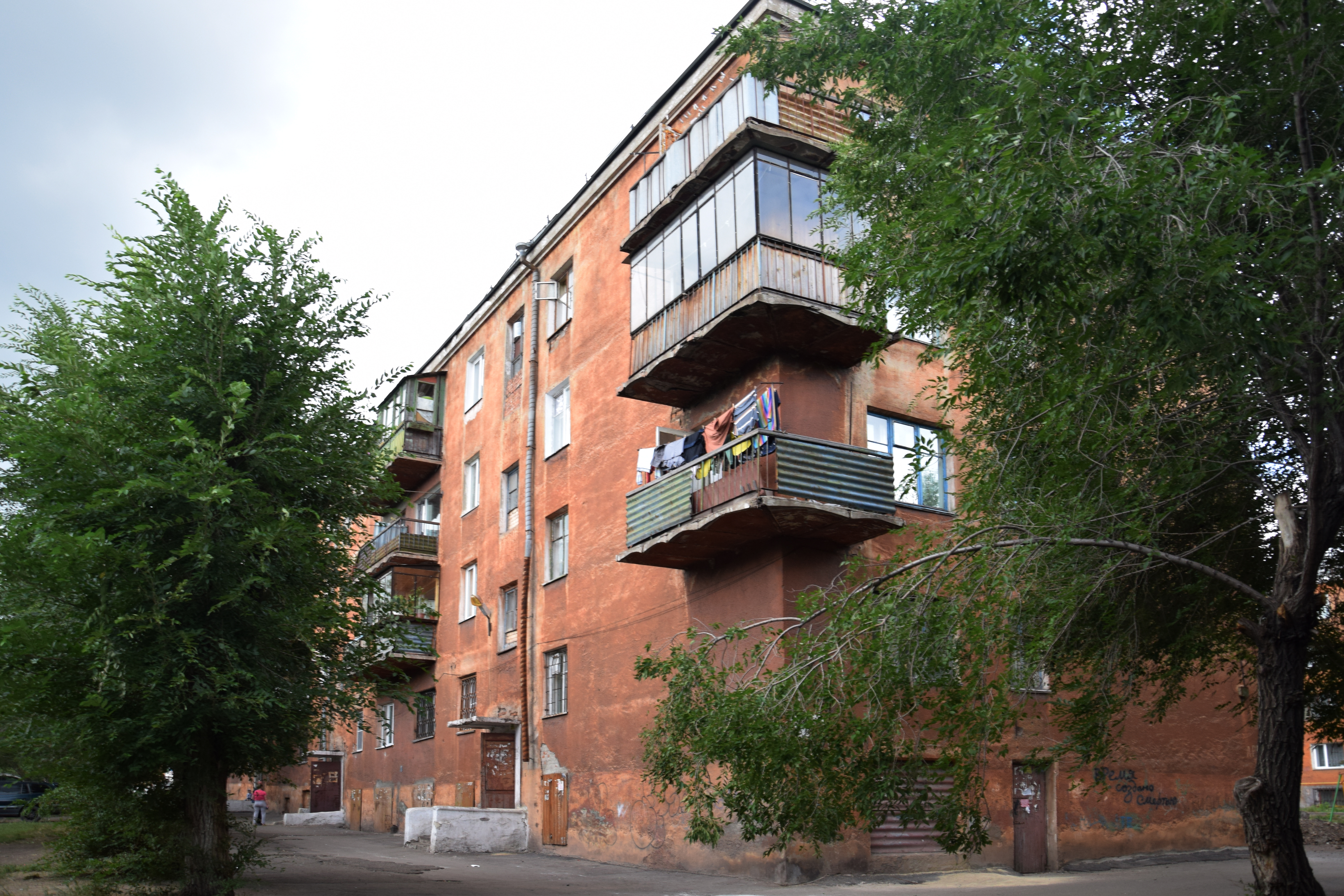
The first capital residential building of the first socialist city - Magnitogorsk. It was laid on July 5, 1930 according to the design of S. E. Chernyshev in the presence of 14 thousand builders

At the turn of the 1930s, the USSR embarked on rapid industrialization. The "Five-Year National Economic Plan for 1928/29—1932/33" was approved in 1929, prioritizing military-industrial development. Housing and cultural projects received minimal investment.

=== Socialist cities (Socgorod) ===
One goal of the five-year plan was to create new socialist cities ("socgorods") with communal living principles, especially around new industrial complexes in remote areas. These cities were meant to proletarianize the population and serve as administrative-industrial hubs. The concept of the socgorod was not just an architectural utopia but a state directive aligned with economic planning.

A major urban planning debate took place in 1929-1930 over socialist city designs. Two main factions emerged:

- Urbanists (L.M. Sabsoovich, M.A. Okhitovich): Advocated for compact mid-sized cities with large communal housing blocks.
- Deurbanists: Proposed linear settlements with standardized individual housing units amid nature.

The debate was shut down in the early 1930s as housing policy was taken over by L.M. Kaganovich. A 1930 decree rejected radical communal living as utopian and impractical, shifting focus to pragmatic socialist city planning.

Many socgorods were built in remote areas, with workers arriving both voluntarily and forcibly (prisoners, deportees). Severe resource constraints led to initial reliance on barracks and temporary structures. Even permanent housing was often of poor quality. Workers in the Urals frequently complained about overcrowding, lack of hot water, furniture, linens, and heating. The conditions in self-built slums ("nakhalovkas") were even worse.

Over time, workers moved into more permanent housing, though priority was given to "shock workers" and Stakhanovites. Despite improvements, economic constraints led to rushed and low-quality construction. Even where communal housing was not planned, overcrowding was common.

More comfortable housing, including individual homes, was reserved for senior officials and foreign specialists. As a result, the actual socgorod housing system differed significantly from early proposals. In Magnitogorsk in the late 1930s, housing distribution was as follows:

- 50% — Temporary housing (barracks)
- 25% — Underground dwellings
- 15% — 3-5 story communal apartment buildings (3-4 people per room)
- 8% — Self-built slums ("nakhalovkas", "нахаловок")
- 2% — Cottages in the elite "Berezki" settlement for senior officials and specialists, plus a central hotel

=== First Stalinist apartments: Housing policy in the 1930s ===
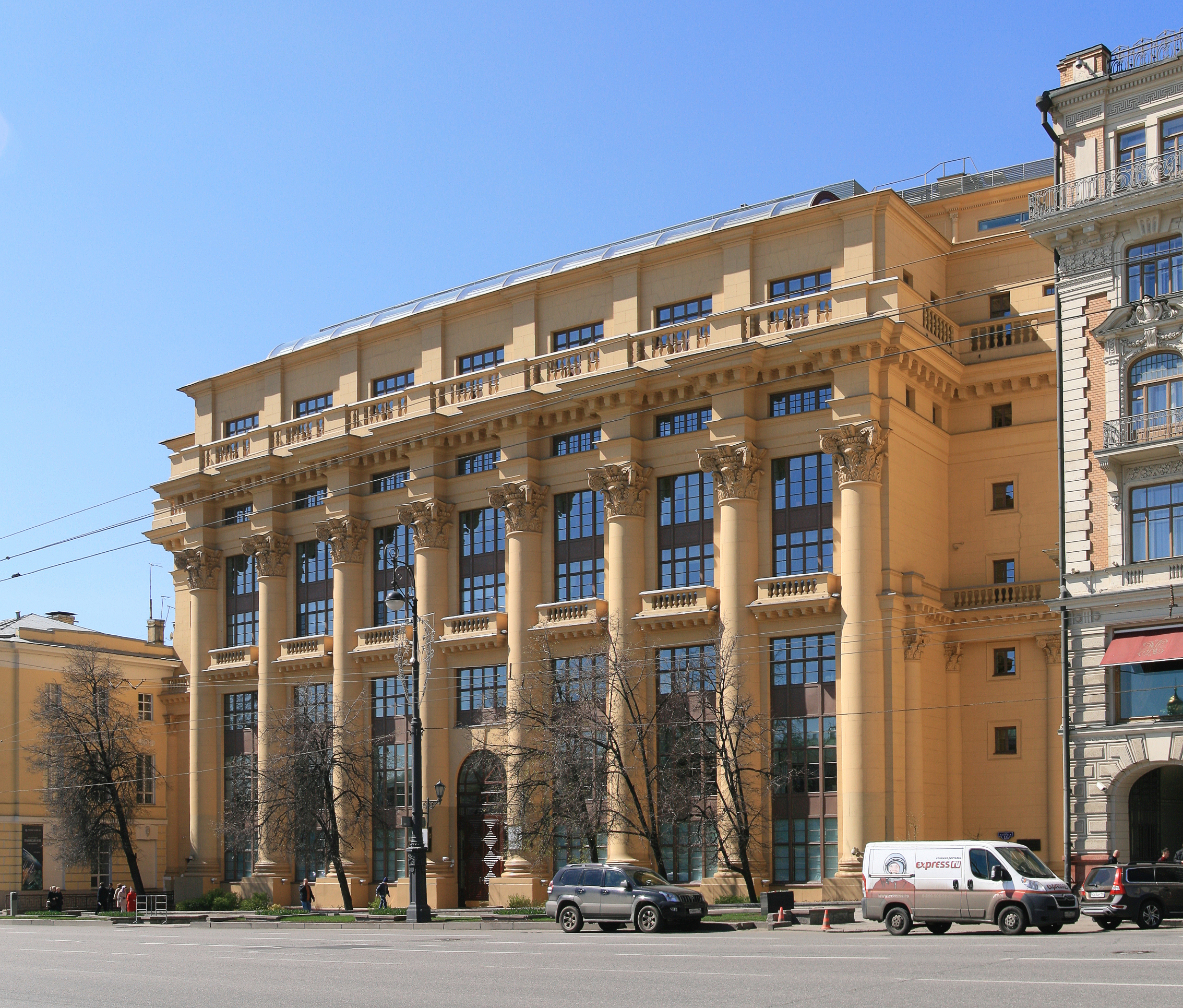
Residential building on Mokhovaya in Moscow

The 1930s saw a shift away from avant-garde architecture toward a revival of classical styles. Soviet architects, often under state pressure, abandoned constructivism in favor of monumental, retrospective styles. The turning point was Ivan Zholtovsky's 1934 apartment building for Moscow Soviet employees.

According to historian V. Z. Paperny, Soviet housing in the early 20th century evolved from collectivist ideals to individualistic living arrangements, with the architectural shift in the 1930s marking the divide. The search for new social housing forms gave way to a focus on state grandeur, expressed through "Stalinist" apartment buildings.

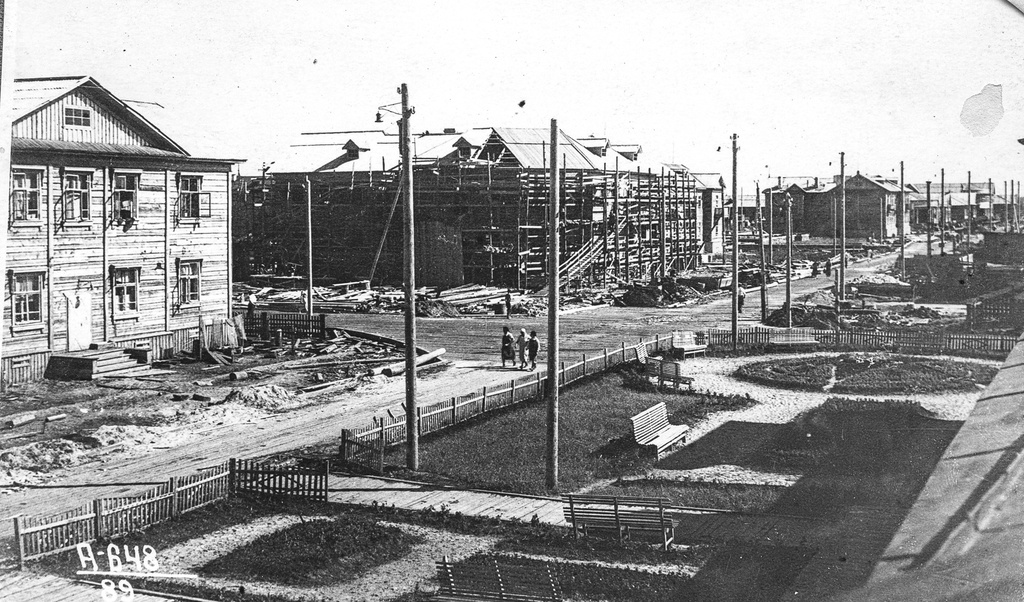
Construction of houses of Sudostroy (now Severodvinsk). 1938.

By the late 1930s, new housing was informally divided into elite and communal categories. Stalinist apartment blocks ("Stalinkas") were promoted as future "worker palaces," but many were actually elite housing for officials, engineers, and artists. These apartments had high ceilings, spacious layouts with separate offices, children's rooms, libraries, large kitchens, and private bathrooms. Scientists were allocated 20 m² per person. In contrast, workers lived in communal apartments, often without decorative elements. While older cities had better construction standards, worker housing was generally smaller and less comfortable, often concentrated in city outskirts or barracks.

Even Moscow had barracks. Despite a 1934 ban on barrack construction, their number increased from 5,000 to 5,200 by 1938. However, housing remained cheap—workers spent just 4-5% of their family budget on rent in 1932-33. Later, full cost recovery for housing became state policy.

Housing was also used to tie workers to their jobs. A 1931 law revoked housing rights for workers who violated labor discipline. A 1937 decree placed state housing under local councils, enterprises, and institutions.

Private housing construction declined under Stalin. In 1931, private architectural projects were banned, leading to a temporary rise in cooperative housing. However, by 1937, cooperatives were abolished. State-sponsored construction, though dominant, was plagued by mismanagement and inefficiency. In 1940, a crackdown on unauthorized construction made citizens fully dependent on government housing allocations.

In the 1930s, rural areas also faced housing shortages due to collectivization, as industrial workers were temporarily sent to aid in collective farm construction.

=== Statistics ===
Housing construction could not keep pace with the rapid population growth in cities caused by industrialization. During the pre-war period, the total housing stock decreased, and sanitary and hygienic conditions deteriorated. In Moscow, the average living space per person dropped from 5.5 m² in 1930 to nearly 4 m² by 1940. The situation was particularly dire in newly built socialist cities. In communal housing there, residents were crammed in at a "starvation" norm of 3–5 m² per person, sometimes even less. In the Donbas region in the mid-1930s, 40% of workers had less than 2 m² of living space.

According to the 1939 census, the urban population of the USSR had reached 56.1 million people. Depending on the city, the average living space per person ranged from 4.5 to 8 m². By 1940, the total urban housing stock of the USSR amounted to 421 million m² of total space, or (according to other data) 167.2 million m² of actual living space.

A significant portion of the housing stock consisted of various types of communal housing—kommunalki (communal apartments), which had already become a familiar feature of Soviet cities. The cramped living conditions in the first half of the 20th century did not significantly dampen the social enthusiasm of the generations building socialism. Researcher T. P. Khlynina argues that Soviet housing policy was only occasionally perceived as a form of punishment by the population, contrary to the portrayal in the works of M. G. Meerovich.

Housing quality suffered due to significant wear and tear. The private housing sector, which made up 35% of urban housing in 1936, was especially deteriorated. The minimum required credit for repairing this housing stock was estimated at 60 million rubles per year, yet in 1936, Tsekombank allocated only 10 million rubles for this purpose.

In rural areas, where families traditionally owned their own homes, housing shortages were significantly less severe.

== Destruction of the war and the reconstruction of housing stock ==
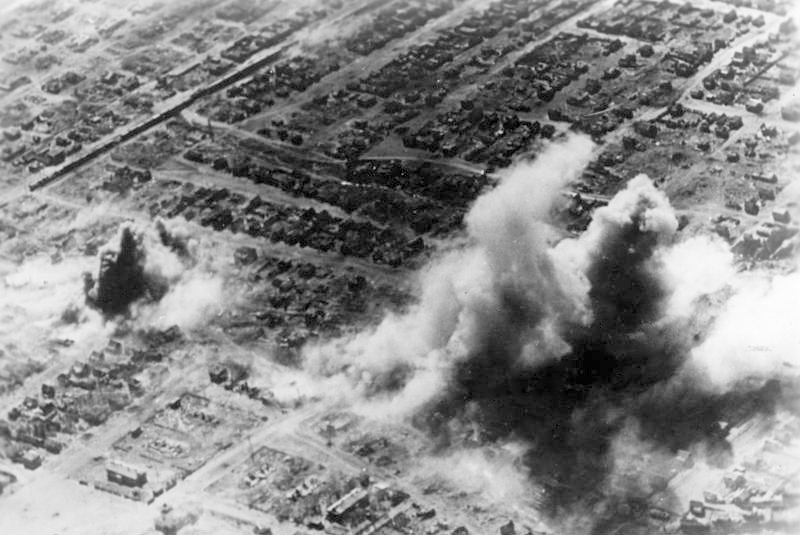
Individual residential area of Stalingrad during the German bombing

In the first months of the Great Patriotic War, the destruction caused by combat actions and the evacuation of the population exacerbated an already severe housing crisis. Housing managements of city executive committees in the affected cities constantly monitored the condition of the housing stock and assisted those left homeless, both through construction and relocation to vacant housing. However, the practice of resettling people into vacant housing introduced even more uncertainty into the housing situation. The return of former tenants from the front, from evacuation, and from exile only intensified the housing issue. Sometimes, at the initiative of Soviet and party leadership in cities, the public was involved in the repair and restoration of housing. Surprisingly, during the difficult war years, the cramped living conditions in communal apartments, which deprived individuals of privacy, saved many lives. Communal kitchens became "places where everyone warmed up and saw who was eating what," and turned into sources of mutual aid among the residents. In besieged Leningrad, neighbors became the sole breadwinners for those who had lost all their relatives: they used their ration cards, cared for the residents of "orphaned" apartments, and adopted orphaned children.

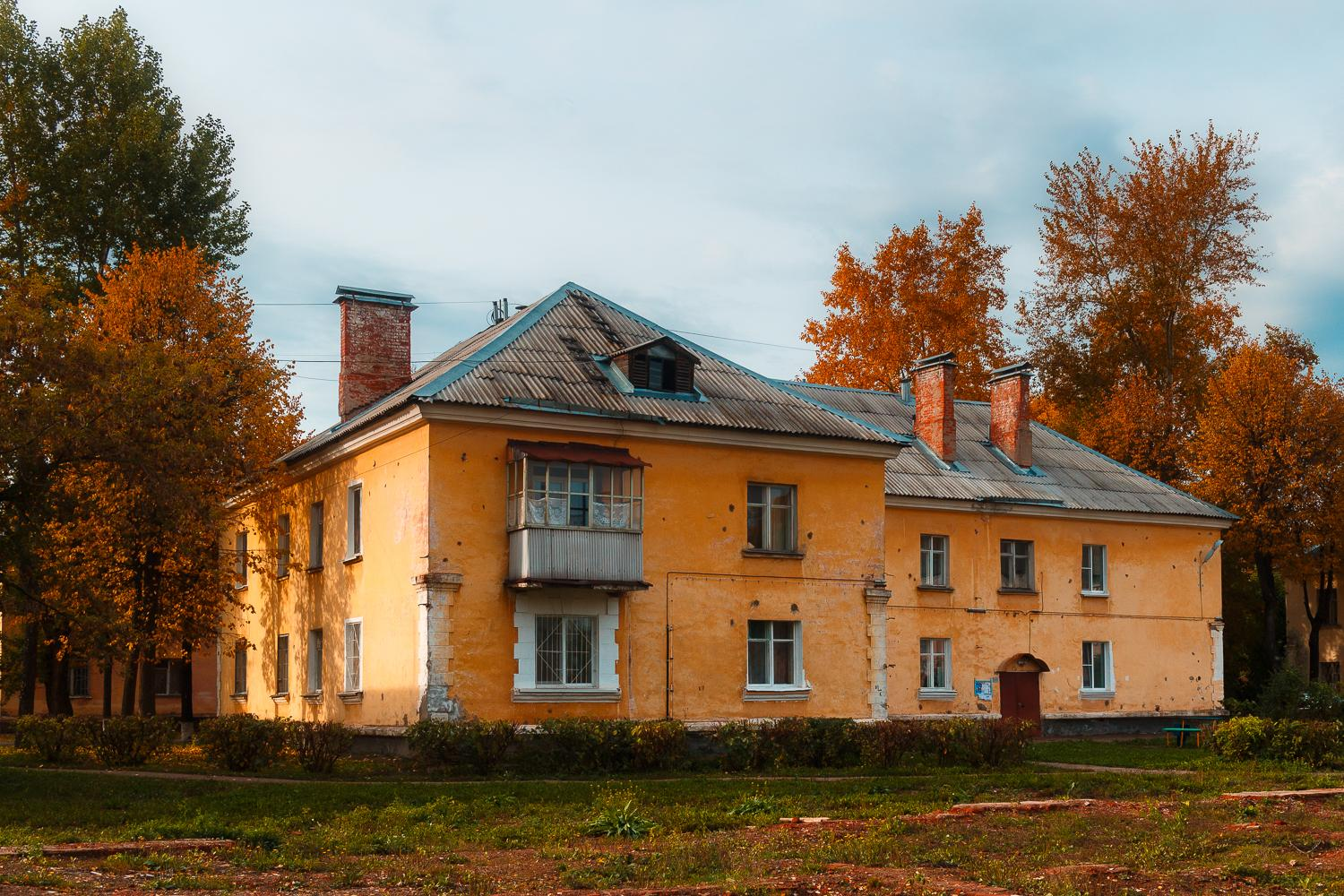
Two-storey Stalinist house built in 1950 in Glazov (Udmurtia). Series 1-201

The degree of destruction in cities depended on the timing and nature of the occupation, proximity to the front line, and could reach up to 100%. The restoration of housing and communal services in these settlements began immediately after their liberation. The shortage of construction materials and engineering equipment was compensated by salvaging them from destroyed buildings. In 1943, the party committee in Rostov-on-Don passed a resolution on organizing the collection of construction materials but soon noted that it was not being followed: for example, the manager of one of the canteens was dismantling floors and partitions in destroyed buildings for firewood and was convicted. The same committee noted that the repair and restoration work in the city was unsatisfactory and the allocated funds were being spent slowly. Construction during the war years was actively carried out in the Urals, Siberia, Kazakhstan, and the Far East. German prisoners of war were mobilized for the construction of new buildings. To this day, many cities in the former USSR have "German" neighborhoods built using German technologies and plans.

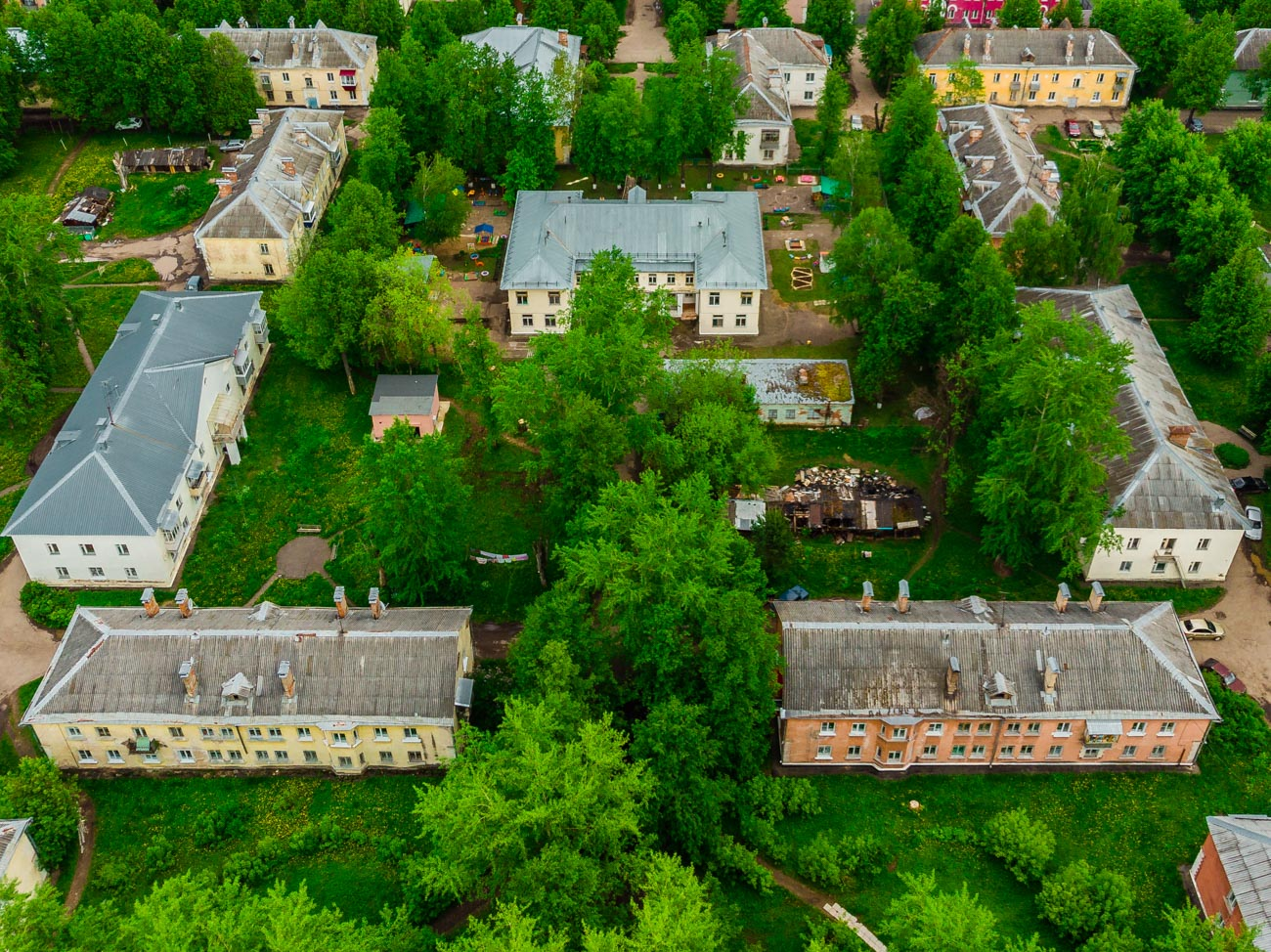
A typical microdistrict of the early 1950s, consisting of two-story Stalin-era buildings in Glazov (Udmurtia)

In Stalingrad, one of the most affected cities, it took 10 years after the Battle of Stalingrad to restore the pre-war volume of housing stock. Initially, low-rise construction was carried out on the outskirts of the city: barracks, prefabricated panel housing, including individual homes. Starting in 1950, Stalingrad's development took on a more complex character. In the central part of the city, solid 4–7-story buildings were constructed. The residents of the city made a huge contribution to its revival. As early as 1943, the "Cherkasov movement" began. Followers of kindergarten teacher A. M. Cherkasova voluntarily worked on construction sites for 6 million 580 thousand hours over five years. By January 1, 1951, the movement had 95,000 people, almost half of the city's working population. Although the volume of the housing stock was restored by 1953, its quality left much to be desired: thousands of Stalingrad residents lived in barracks, and some individual houses were not connected to electricity (in 1950, they made up 20% of all individual houses).

In general, the Great Patriotic War exacerbated the housing crisis to its limit. An inventory of the housing stock led to the realization of the need for its significant renewal, giving rise to an entire design movement that spanned all major workshops. The question of what newly constructed housing should look like found its reflection in rationalizing proposals, interest in lighter construction, and cost-effective prefabricated, panel houses. In the conditions of a shortage of skilled labor and quality materials, mass housing could only be low-rise. By the late 1940s, the USSR officially adopted the paradigm of low-rise standardized housing construction, consisting of small neighborhoods of structurally uniform (brick, wooden, cinder-block, etc.) single- and two-story residential buildings, forming microdistricts. The development of standardized design across the country allowed for the rapid restoration of the housing stock. These solid low-rise houses filled the gap between pre-war barracks, temporary housing, and the luxurious elite Stalin-era buildings that continued to be constructed even after the war: significant resources were directed towards multi-story monumental complexes made of these buildings in city centers. The creation of these complexes was required by the authorities, and their construction was particularly important in cities most affected by the war.

The decree issued in August 1946 by the Council of Ministers of the USSR, "On Increasing Wages and Housing Construction for Workers, Engineering and Technical Workers of Enterprises and Construction Projects Located in the Urals, Siberia, and the Far East," allowed those interested to improve their housing conditions by building a small two- or three-room house on their own. A state loan of 8,000 rubles was provided for a two-room wooden house and 10,000 rubles for a brick house. The loan repayment period for the two-room house was 10 years at an interest rate of 1% per year.

Archival documents from the early 1950s are filled with complaints from workers and employees about their living conditions. At the party conference of the Chelyabinsk Tractor Plant, the workshop manager A. Prilezhsky reported that when hiring workers, 90% inquired about housing. However, the workshop was unable to allocate a single apartment. Many enterprises had to resort to the "people’s construction" method, encouraged by the authorities as an example of "high socialist consciousness." Workers were required to build their own houses during their free time using construction materials allocated by their enterprise. The houses built in this way were owned by the state. This method originated in the city of Gorky and, due to its labor intensity, was colloquially called the "bitter" method. The share of such housing in the total housing construction was small.

In the post-war years, the fleet of machines and mechanisms grew, and mechanized methods of housing construction became dominant. However, despite the availability of high-performance machines, construction materials mostly remained the same, so new machines and mechanisms were often used inefficiently, and a large percentage of the work was done manually. The development of housing construction was negatively affected by the dispersion of resources across numerous small organizations.

=== Statistics ===
Official statistics reported that during the war:

More than 1,700 cities and towns were destroyed, approximately 70 million square meters of residential space were destroyed, and more than 25 million people were completely left homeless. In the difficult conditions of wartime, around 50 million square meters of residential space were built and restored. — Decree of the Central Committee of the CPSU and the Council of Ministers of the USSR, July 31, 1957, No. 931 "On the Development of Housing Construction in the USSR"

By the end of the 1940s, the pre-war level of residential space was reached. However, the compiler of the report noted that the growth in housing stock did not keep up with the population's housing needs due to the significant increase in the urban population. The average size of residential space per person in urban areas on January 1, 1953, in socialized housing was 5.6 m², including 6.0 m² in houses of local councils and 5.3 m² in houses of ministries and agencies. Taking into account temporarily residing and unregistered individuals, the actual availability of living space was significantly lower. The average availability of living space in 1952 remained at the 1950 level and only slightly exceeded the 1940 level. In some cities in 1952 (Kuibyshev, Molotov, Chelyabinsk, Novosibirsk), housing availability was below 5 m². However, according to D. S. Khmelnitsky, the data on residential space per person in the report was overstated. Moreover, the report includes data on the share of barracks in the total urban housing stock (18 million m² in 1952, a 144% increase from 1940). In general, the report shows that the housing situation in the USSR deteriorated during the 1930s–1940s. In particular, the residential area of Soviet cities in 1940 was almost the same as in 1929 (166 million m²). This means that new construction over the past decades barely covered the loss of housing stock.

Credit for individual construction allowed large numbers of people to get involved in it. From the end of the war until the late 1950s, 22-27% of the total area introduced in the RSFSR was built by individual developers.

== Mass standard industrial construction ==
=== Origins of standard, industrial and panel housing construction ===
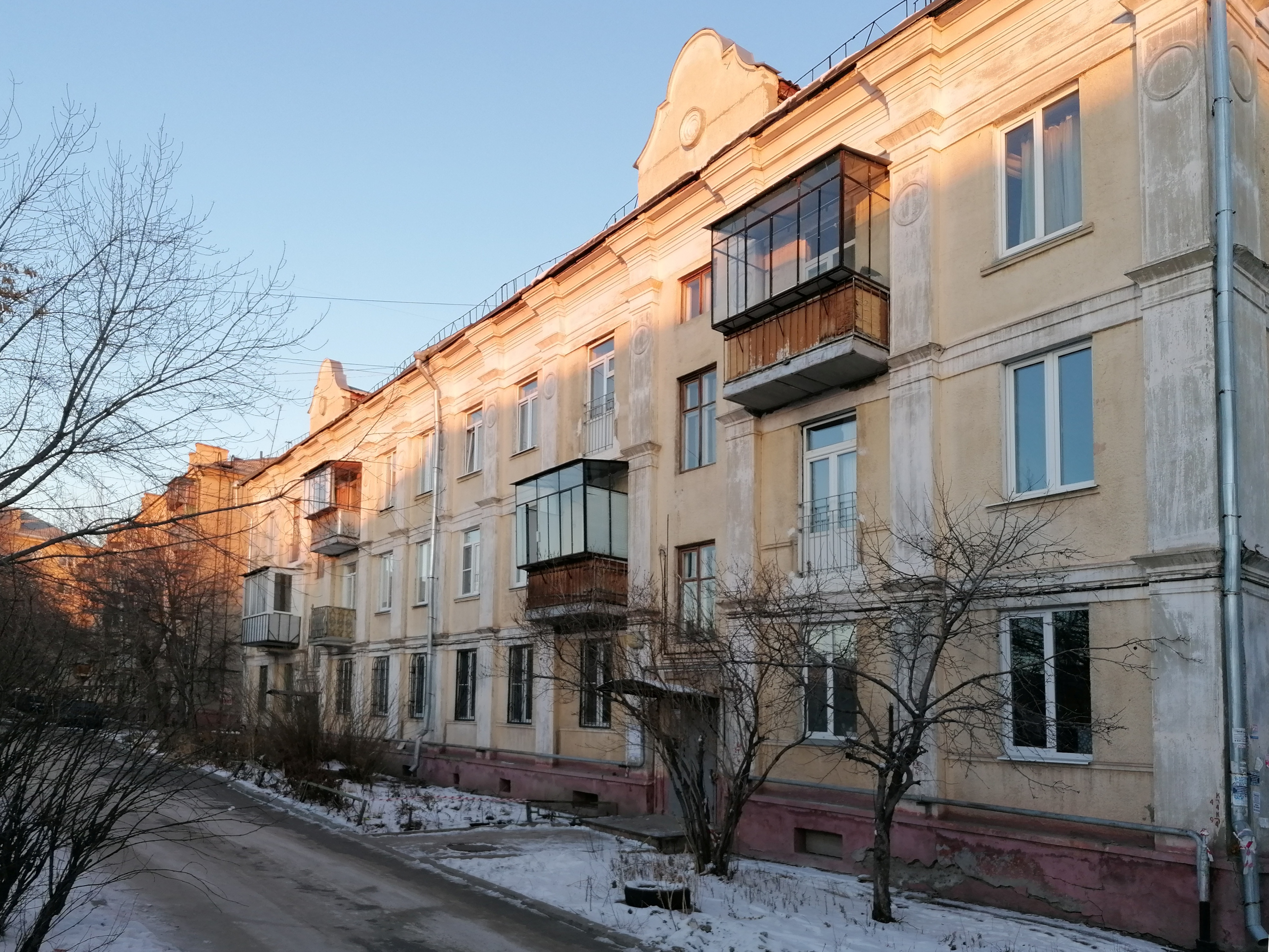
The first large-panel frameless house in the USSR. 1950, Magnitogorsk, Karl Marx Ave., No. 32

The first experience in mass industrial housing construction in the USSR dates back to the period before the Great Patriotic War (the factory produced elements for the First Worker’s Settlement in Ivanovo-Voznesensk). In 1927, a Soviet delegation visited Germany to familiarize themselves with the experience of building social housing by E. Mai using large pumice-concrete panels. However, this form of construction organization did not find mass application. Early Soviet construction projects were characterized by the lack of a system of standard sizes and a clear scheme for organizing and distributing work, with a semi-handmade method of manufacturing components. All of this reduced the economic efficiency of construction.

In 1936, the USSR Council of People's Commissars and the Central Committee of the All-Union Communist Party (Bolsheviks) published a decree “On Improving the Construction Industry and Reducing Construction Costs.” This marked the beginning of the process of industrialization and standardization in construction. The successful use of assembly-line methods during the development of the Big Kaluga Street in Moscow at the end of the 1930s vividly demonstrated the prospects for optimizing the construction process.

In the pre-war period, research was conducted in the field of product standardization, and, for example, ready-made reinforced concrete staircases were already in use. In large cities, the first Soviet houses made from large blocks were being built, and there was a characteristic trend towards economical solutions. However, the task of developing full-fledged residential series was not set (although in 1939, Gosstroiproekt was instructed to develop standard projects for multi-story buildings), and the industrialization of construction related to building and structural elements, with no connection to simplifying the facades' design. The example of the “Lattice House” by A. K. Burov and B. N. Blokhin from 1940 showed that industrial housing construction and quality, diverse architecture were by no means contradictory. This experimental house became a transitional stage from block construction to industrial panel construction.

The first attempts to build with panels in the USSR date back to the 1930s and 1940s (see Khrushchyovka#First Soviet Panel Houses). Starting in 1945, frame-panel houses were being constructed in Yekaterinburg. In Ukraine, panel housing construction began in 1949 under the initiative of the First Secretary of the Central Committee of the Communist Party of Ukraine, N. S. Khrushchyov. This experience demonstrated the great potential of industrial housing construction, especially in terms of cost-effectiveness and speed of erection. In 1950, the first Soviet non-frame large-panel residential building was constructed in Magnitogorsk (Karl Marx Avenue, 32) (engineers G. Kuznetsov, B. Smirnov, A. Mkrtumyan, architects L. O. Bumazhny, Z. Nesterova).

As in Western countries, the adoption of standard and industrial housing construction methods accelerated due to the need for rapid restoration of housing stock after the war. In 1949, Gosstroiproekt released a study on standard design that was comprehensive enough to allow for the transition to mass standard design. The adoption of the serial method of standard design (creating series of standard projects, unified in terms of architectural character) and its application throughout the country made it possible to quickly restore the housing stock.

=== Khrushchev's reform ===
A week after the funeral of I. V. Stalin, at a session of the Supreme Soviet of the USSR, the new chairman of the government, G. M. Malenkov, called for an expansion of housing construction. On August 18, 1953, five months after Stalin's death, a secret "Report of the USSR Central Statistical Administration to L. M. Kaganovich on the state of the urban housing stock in 1940-1952" was presented, and in March 1954, a report on the state of communal services for the urban population was submitted to Malenkov. According to architectural historian D. S. Khmelnytsky, the data reflected in these documents indicated the government's preparation for a reform in housing construction that was meant to resolve the acute housing crisis. The reasons for this crisis included: the unprecedented migration of rural residents to cities, which began even before the Revolution and accelerated in the 1930s (in 1917, urban residents accounted for 17% of the population of the country; by 1956, it was 48.4%); the dilapidation and wear of the urban housing stock; the significant lag in residential construction behind industrial growth (in the 1930s, residential space in Soviet cities grew very slowly while the population rapidly increased); the war and its consequences (70 million m² of residential area were destroyed).

The growth of residential space in cities began after the war. According to the report from the Central Statistical Administration, between 1946 and 1952, 78.2 million m² of residential space was built and restored in cities and worker settlements, in addition to 45.1 million m² of individual homes built by the population. As a result, by 1952, the urban housing stock amounted to 208.2 million m², compared to 167 million m² before the war. However, it is necessary to note that the statistics on housing construction also included barracks and other temporary housing.

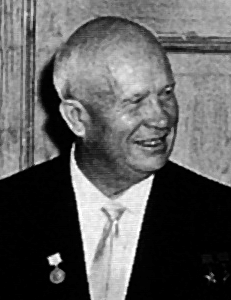
Nikita Khrushchev in 1959

On December 7, 1954, the First Secretary of the CPSU Central Committee, Khrushchev, sharply criticized housing construction in his famous speech at the Second All-Union Conference of Builders, Architects, and Workers of the Construction Materials Industry, Construction and Road Machinery Engineering, and Design and Research Organizations. By this time, a decree from the CPSU Central Committee and the Council of Ministers of the USSR, dated August 19, 1954, "On the development of the production of prefabricated reinforced concrete structures and components for construction" had already been issued. It called for the construction of hundreds of prefabricated reinforced concrete plants and required that metal be replaced with prefabricated reinforced concrete wherever possible. Criticism of Stalin's neoclassicism began. Khrushchev accused its architects of extravagance:

“…they understand architecture too aesthetically, as an artistic activity, and not as a means of satisfying the urgent needs of the Soviet people. They spend people's money on unnecessary beauties, instead of building more simply but more.”

It is known that the cost of constructing the Moscow State University skyscraper was equivalent to the cost of building a small city of five-story panel houses. On November 4, 1955, the CPSU Central Committee and the Council of Ministers of the USSR officially adopted the decree "On eliminating excesses in design and construction," which definitively put an end to the period of Stalinist architecture. This marked a shift in all professional orientations in urban planning and architecture. Soviet architecture was being returned to the mainstream of world architecture. It had to be functional, with simple and strict forms. All resources were directed towards the development of industrial construction methods, standardized design (individual design of residential buildings was almost completely halted), and the increase of economic efficiency and construction speed. Criticism was directed at both completed and under-construction buildings with "excesses." This included four-story houses by Posokhin, about which the press wrote:

"A serious drawback of the houses on Khorohevsky Highway is the use of hanging architectural details—window frames, garlands under windows, and others. We perceive these details not only as architectural excesses—they are organically unsuitable for the very nature of factory housing construction."

However, some houses, mainly based on standard designs, continued to be built in the neoclassical style until the late 1950s. In contrast to the monumental and heavy but at the same time ornate Stalinist architecture, Khrushchyovkas were distinguished not only by the absence of detailed decor but also by their increasingly light and refined constructions. At the same time, Khrushchyovkas were significantly superior to the mass-produced two-story wooden apartment houses built during the Stalin era. In theory and critique, a utilitarian approach to architecture prevailed. The issue of artistic expression took a backseat and was solved with simple compositional methods. The most important element of spatial composition became a group of houses, rather than an individual building. Various combinations of residential and public buildings were applied. Soviet architectural historian S. O. Khan-Magomedov recalled:

"It seemed that the artistic image was altogether disappearing from architecture. Architects were helped by theorist G. Minervin. He believed that individual typical residential buildings ('boxes') could only have a certain artistic appearance, but when combined into complexes (quarters), they could create a collective artistic image. This was acceptable to many at the time."

There was an idea that each factory should produce one type of panel, but this type would be unique. However, this method was abandoned, and all Khrushchyovkas looked very similar. When asked if this was a result of the fight against "excesses" or an attempt at saving, architect N. P. Krajnyaya responded:

"We were fascinated by the novelty of the task, thinking that the reflection of the same comfort for all in architecture was the new aesthetics."

Savings were achieved by rationalizing living space and standardizing solutions. All norms for room dimensions and areas were reduced. The kitchen area was set at 5-6 m², the wardrobe (storage) at 2-2.5 m², and combined bathrooms were provided. The minimum ceiling height became 2.5 m, and the minimum room width was 2.2 m. Trash chutes were eliminated, and so were elevators, which is why Khrushchyovkas were built as five-story buildings: it was found that climbing higher than the fifth floor by stairs was too difficult, especially for the elderly. In an advertisement for Khrushchyovkas, the narrator stated that to make borscht in an old apartment, you would need to take 500 steps, while in the new, small 5.6 m² kitchen, everything was close at hand, and you could literally reach anything with your hand. In turn, the small size of the apartments forced industry to produce smaller furniture. Thus, a particular aesthetic of small, compact things emerged with standard construction. Standardization applied not only to the houses themselves but also to furniture and even daily routines.

As a result, the construction costs of Khrushchyovkas were reduced by 30% or more compared to the Stalin era.

Urban planning principles changed entirely (some were imported from the West). Mathematical-statistical science was introduced into urban planning: society's life in new neighborhoods was carefully modeled, the needs of the people were calculated, and optimal routes to workplaces, schools, and clinics were planned. Social preconditions changed; the new city was seen as a comfortable space for the whole population, not just its privileged part. The common practice of perimeter development of blocks with enclosed courtyard spaces was stopped, and the practice of creating micro-districts spread.

As a result of the shift in construction priorities, the role of urban planners and engineers increased, and the architect was relegated to a secondary position. New houses were designed with the idea of family-based settlement in apartments, not room-based as before, which was a significant step towards improving quality of life. More than half of the urban families had previously lived in communal apartments and dormitories, some even in barracks, basements, cellars, or dilapidated huts. Naturally, in such conditions, people had almost no personal space, and moving into their own, though cramped, apartment was a dream for many. The richly decorated Stalin-era buildings with spacious rooms were meant for the elite, not for ordinary workers.

Architects who slowly abandoned old techniques were repeatedly criticized by Khrushchyov. In his speech at the third construction conference in 1958, he pointed out "recidivism of archaic and decorative elements" in designs:

"Reconstruction in architecture is still not complete. Many misunderstand the tasks and view it only as a reduction of architectural excesses. The issue is a fundamental change in the orientation of architecture, and this task must be carried through to the end."

The 20th Congress of the CPSU in 1956 set the goal of ending the housing deficit within 20 years. On July 31, 1957, the CPSU Central Committee and the Council of Ministers of the USSR adopted a resolution "On the Development of Housing Construction in the USSR." This was of immense significance as it definitively consolidated the new principles of construction and architecture that had emerged by this time. A year later, they were reflected in the new edition of SNiP II-V.10-58 "Residential Buildings." It was with the 1957 resolution and the new edition of SNiP that the era of truly mass housing construction across the USSR began.

=== Khrushchev-era buildings ===
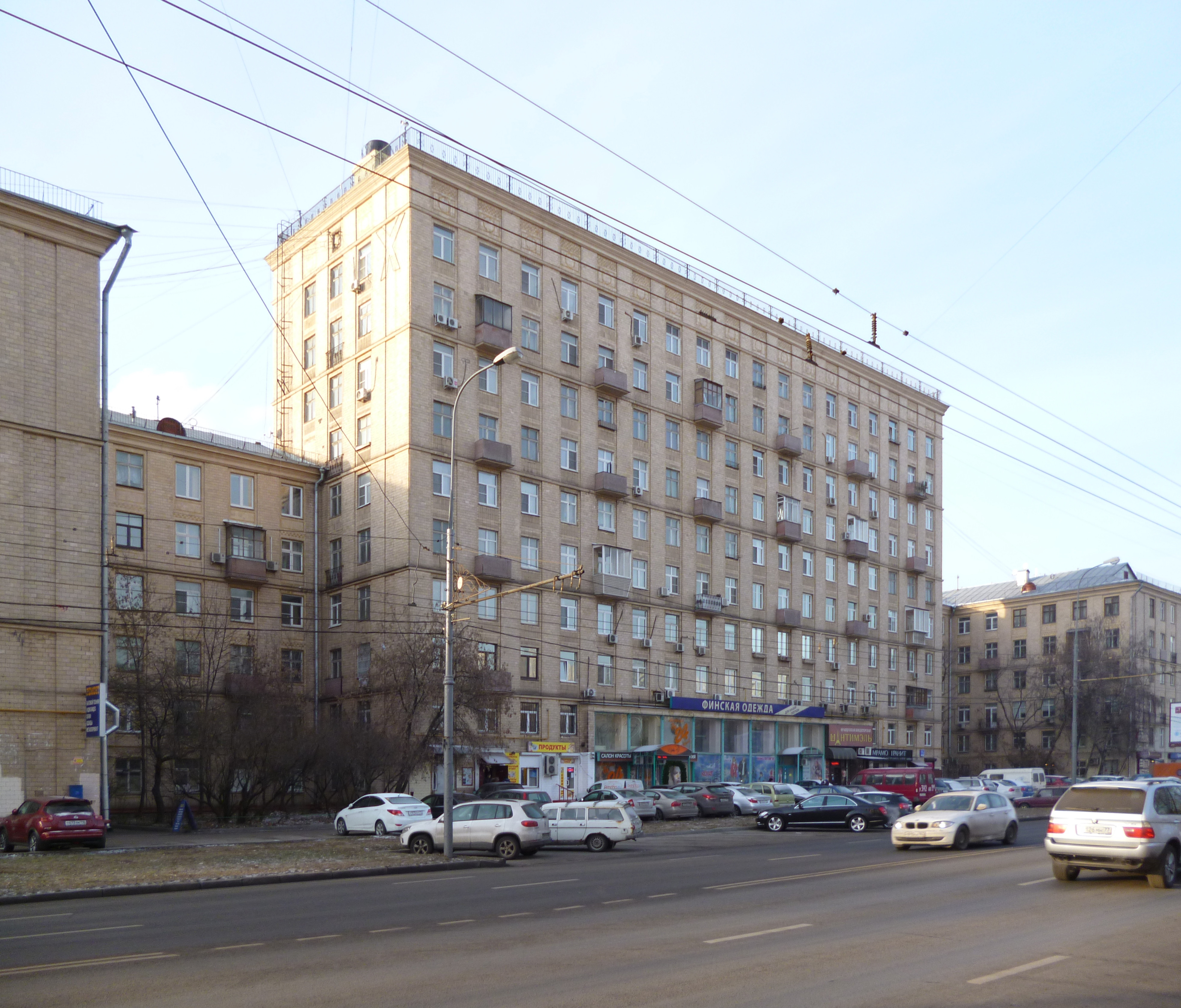
Frame-panel house by architect Posokhin. Moscow. Kuusinen st., 11

Meanwhile, the improvement of panel house designs continued, taking into account the experience of building frame-free panel houses in Magnitogorsk. In 1955, a prototype 5-story, two-section frame-free panel house (designed by Leningrad's "Lenproekt," architect A. Vasilyev and engineer Z. Kaplun) with longitudinal load-bearing walls was built in Leningrad, in Shchemilovka (Polarnikov Street, 10). The outer walls were made of slag concrete panels, sized to the room, and were faced with polished gypsum stone tiles. The ceiling height was 3 meters. Nearby, two blocks of panel houses were built between 1956 and 1958. The projects were developed by a team from the Lenproekt institute (architects E. Levinson, D. Goldgor, G. Alexandrov, A. Shprits, I. Raylyan, I. Tevyan, and A. Alanne). A model of one of the blocks was showcased at the International Exhibition in Brussels and received an award at the competition for the best constructions of the RSFSR.

In Moscow, a team led by architect N. A. Osterman and engineer G. Kuznetsov built a seven-story frame-free large-panel house on Oktyabrskoye Pole (Marshal Biryuzov Street, 7) in 1955. Between 1954 and 1957, the Posokhin team constructed houses on Peschany Streets. This was the first experience in the USSR of creating frame-panel houses 6-10 stories high. These houses already featured noticeably fewer architectural "excesses." The frame-free construction of the building at Oktyabrskoye Pole had many drawbacks compared to the houses built by Posokhin and Mndoyants, but still, due to its economy and flexible layout, the future was seen in this approach.

The site for building experimental houses, which can be considered the first "Khrushchyovkas," was allocated near the Moscow suburb of Cheryomushki. The new district was named Novye Cheryomushki, and the area of experimental houses became its 9th quarter. Construction began in 1956 with the participation of engineer Lagutenko and architects Osterman, S. Lyashenko, and G. Pavlov. Sixteen 4-story houses were built using different technologies: some were block-built, others were panel, and they primarily had four entrances, arranged according to a carefully thought-out plan by specialists in landscaping and landscape architects. In these projects, architects still tried to incorporate unique elements into the design. For example, in Grimau Street, the Khrushchyovkas were crowned with tiles featuring floral patterns. In 1957, the first residents moved into the houses. In many cities across the country, the first areas built with Khrushchyovkas were also dubbed "Cheryomushki."

The task was set to streamline the method of frame-free panel housing construction. The solution to this was also supported by Posokhin, who had gained Khrushchyov's trust. His team relied on the successful French experience. In 1948, the French engineer Raymond Camus patented a panel housing construction system, known as the Camus system. It was used in the construction of new houses during the reconstruction of Le Havre after the war, following the design of O. Perre, and became widely known around the world. In 1959, a Soviet delegation, which included construction specialists and Khrushchyov himself, visited Le Havre to inspect the panel houses. By this time, Camus had already established contacts with the USSR. He visited Moscow several times at the invitation of the Soviet side, and a contract was signed for supplying the USSR with a panel production line. The license for the system of mass production of reinforced concrete products was purchased, which was subsequently adapted by Soviet engineers. Compared to the French houses, Khrushchyovkas were simplified to the extreme.

The most successful houses from Moscow's Novye Cheryomushki became the basis for one of the first mass series of Khrushchyovkas — the K-7 frame-panel series, developed by Lagutenko. It was selected for mass production following a competition personally overseen by Khrushchyov. The advantage of K-7 lay in its low cost and simplicity. It was also extremely easy for manufacturers, with the structures assembled "without mortar" in record time — 12 working days.

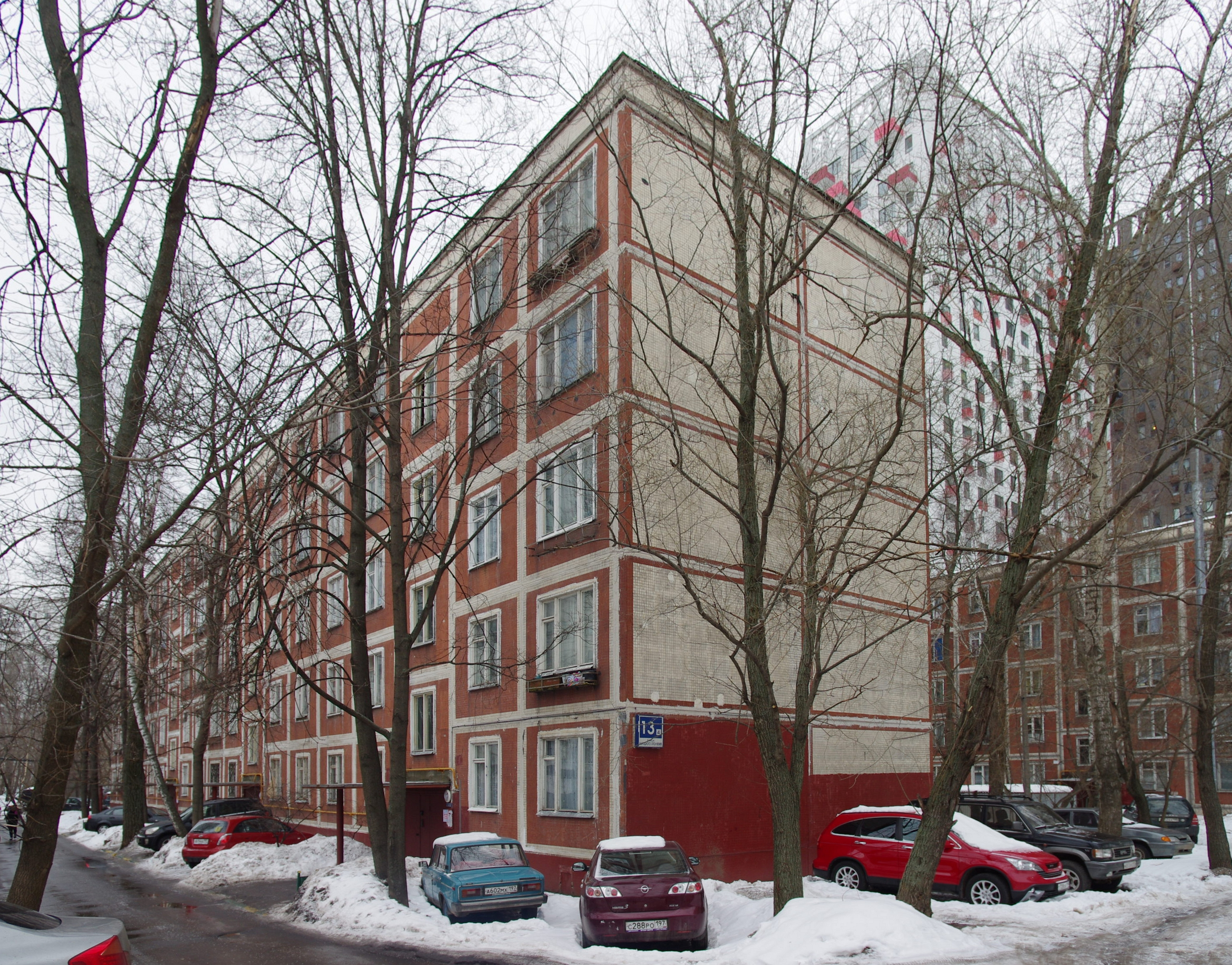
К-7. Moscow.

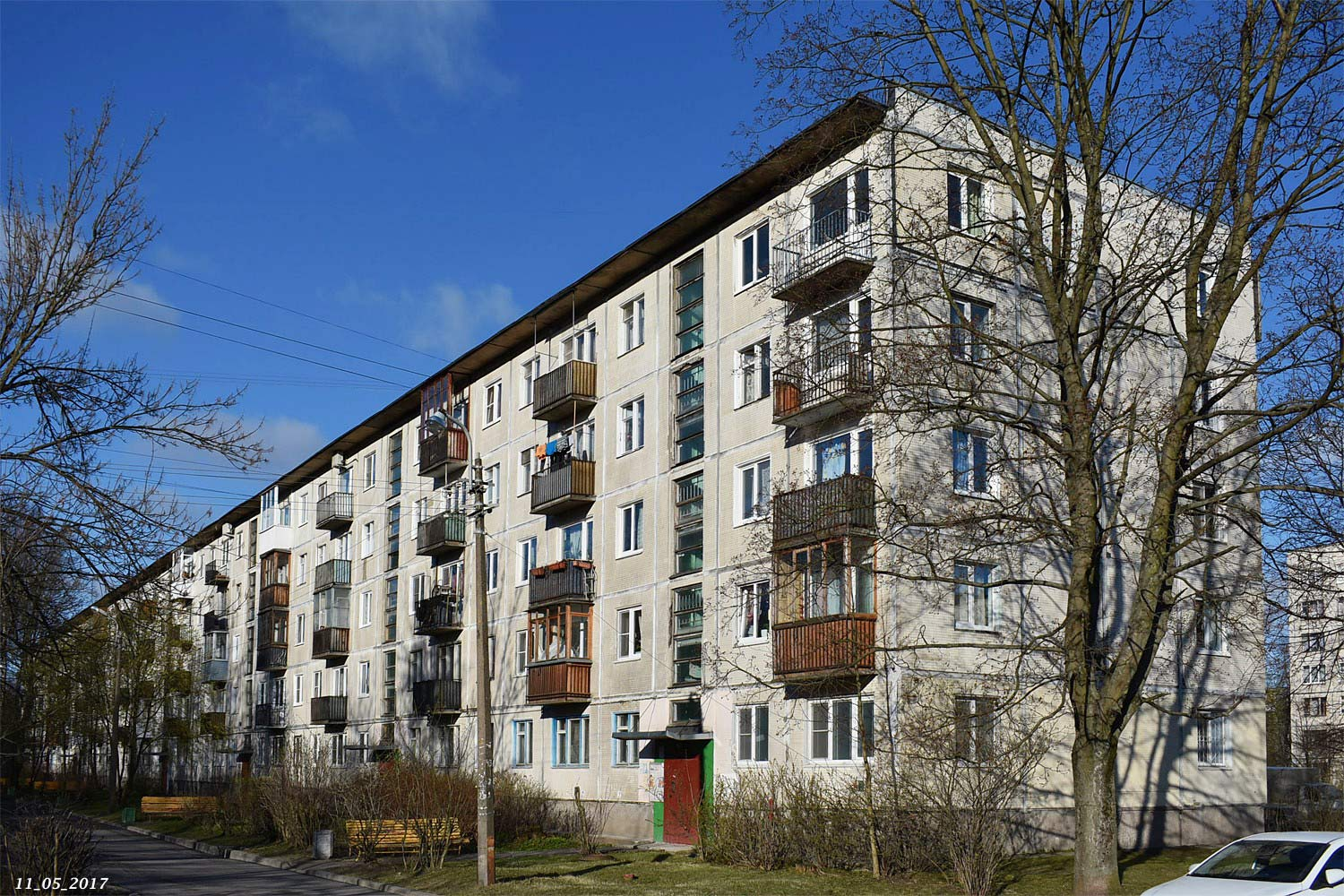
1-335. St. Petersburg

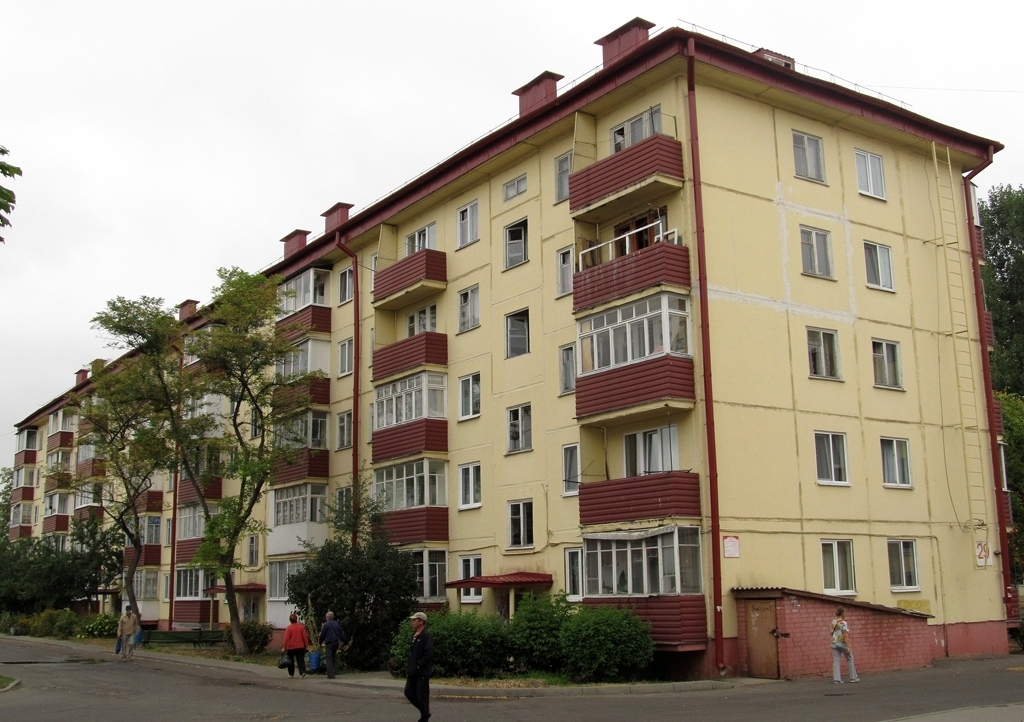
1-464. Soligorsk

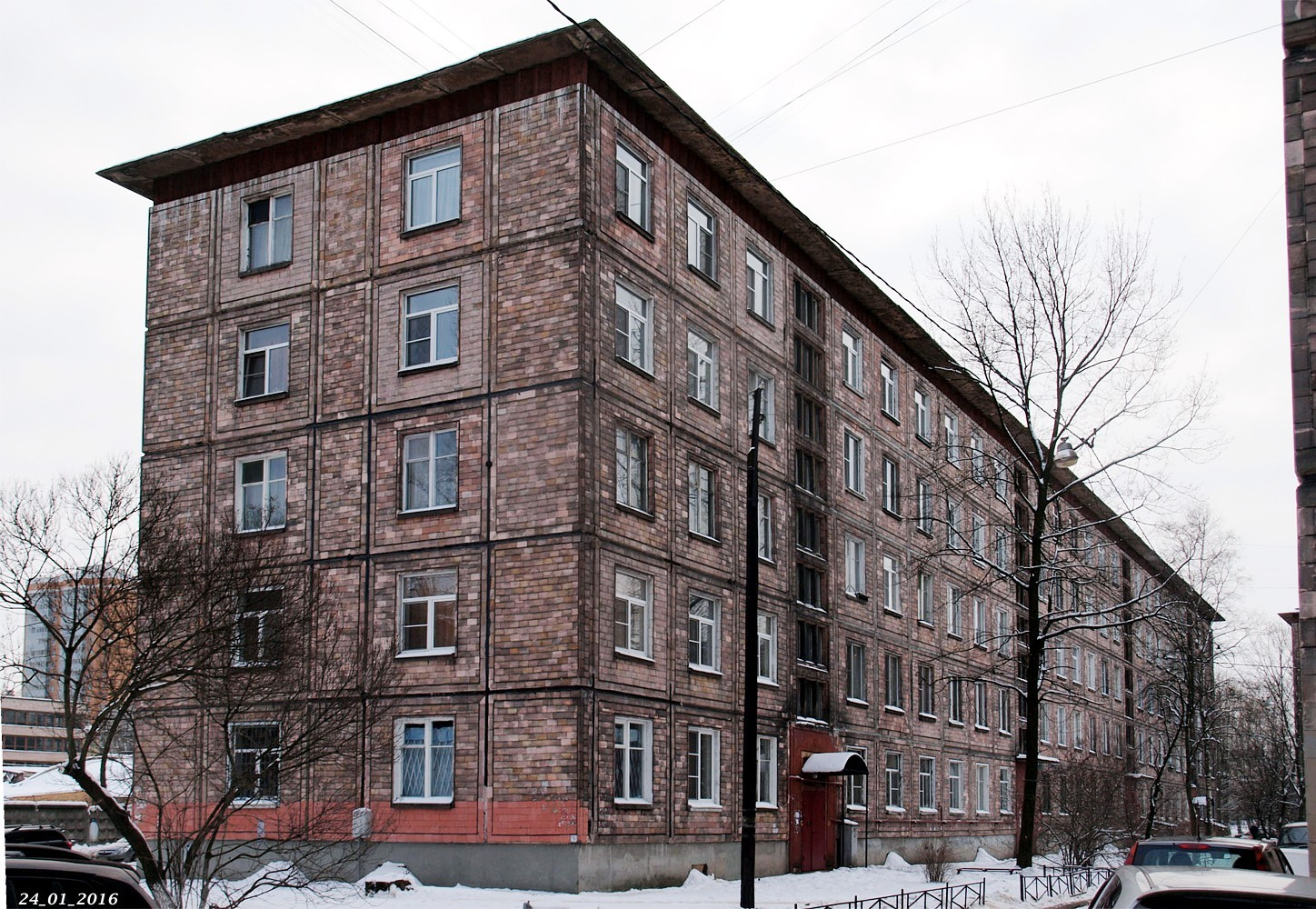
1-506Э. St. Petersburg

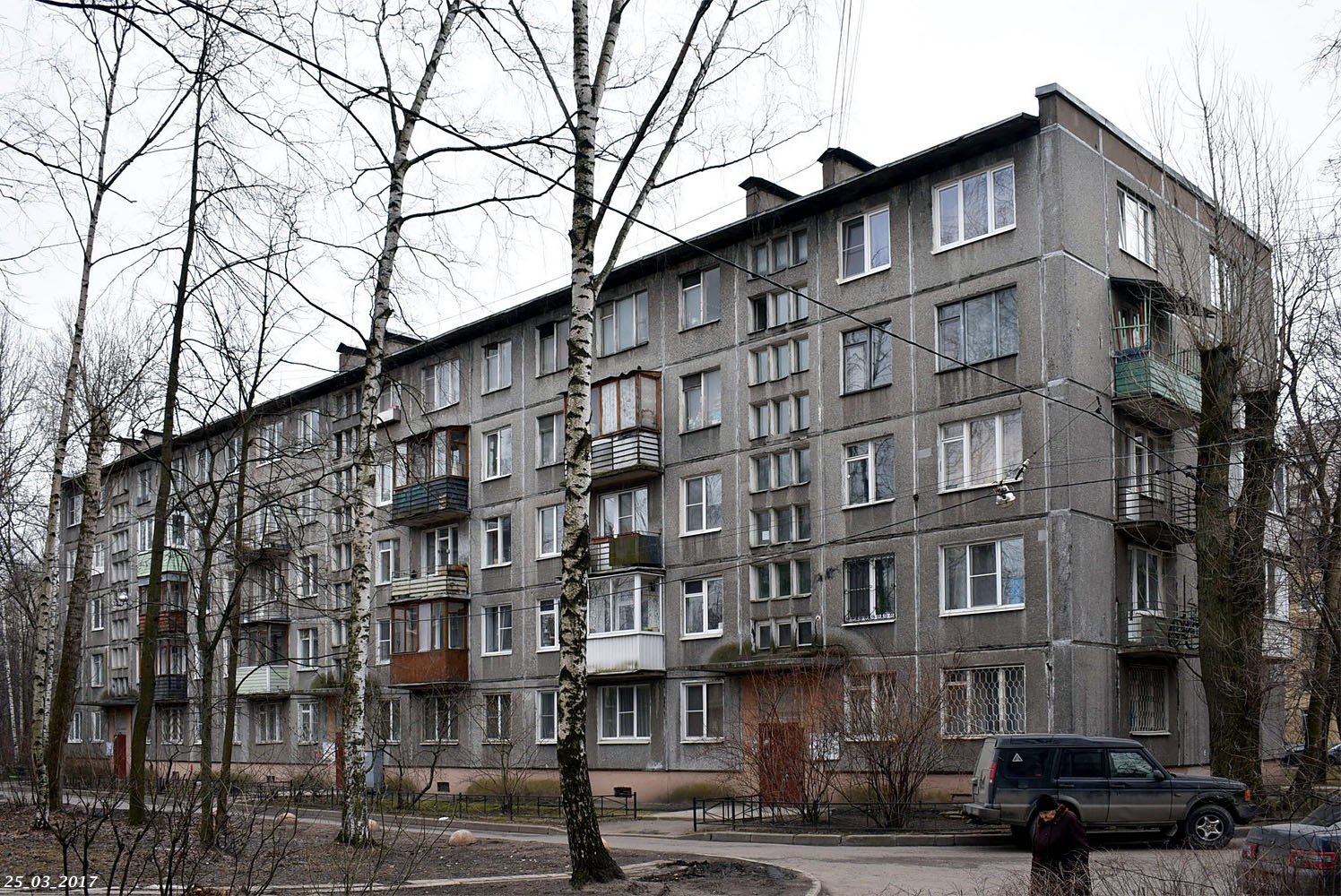
1-507. St. Petersburg

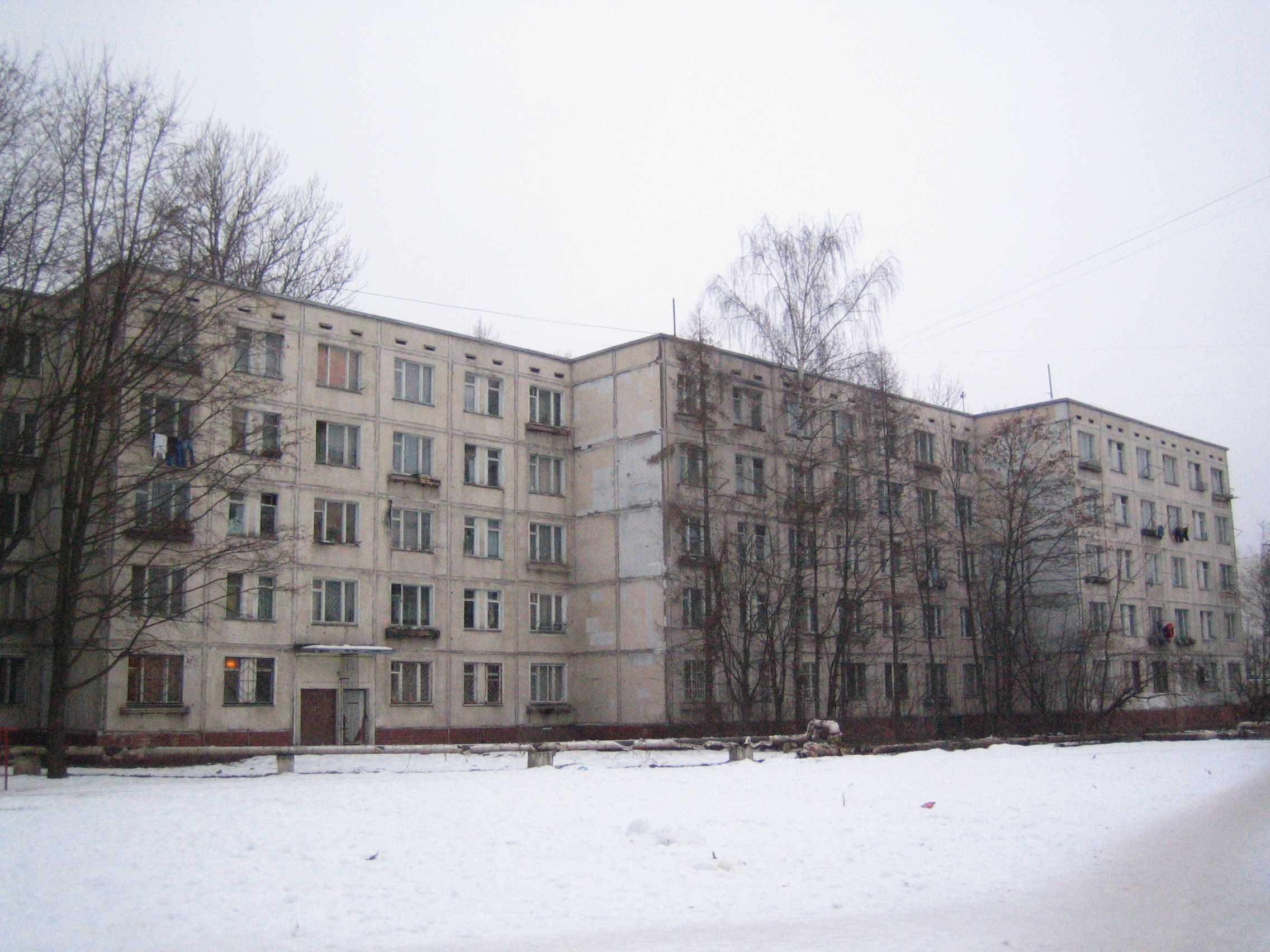
II-32 with small apartments. Moscow.

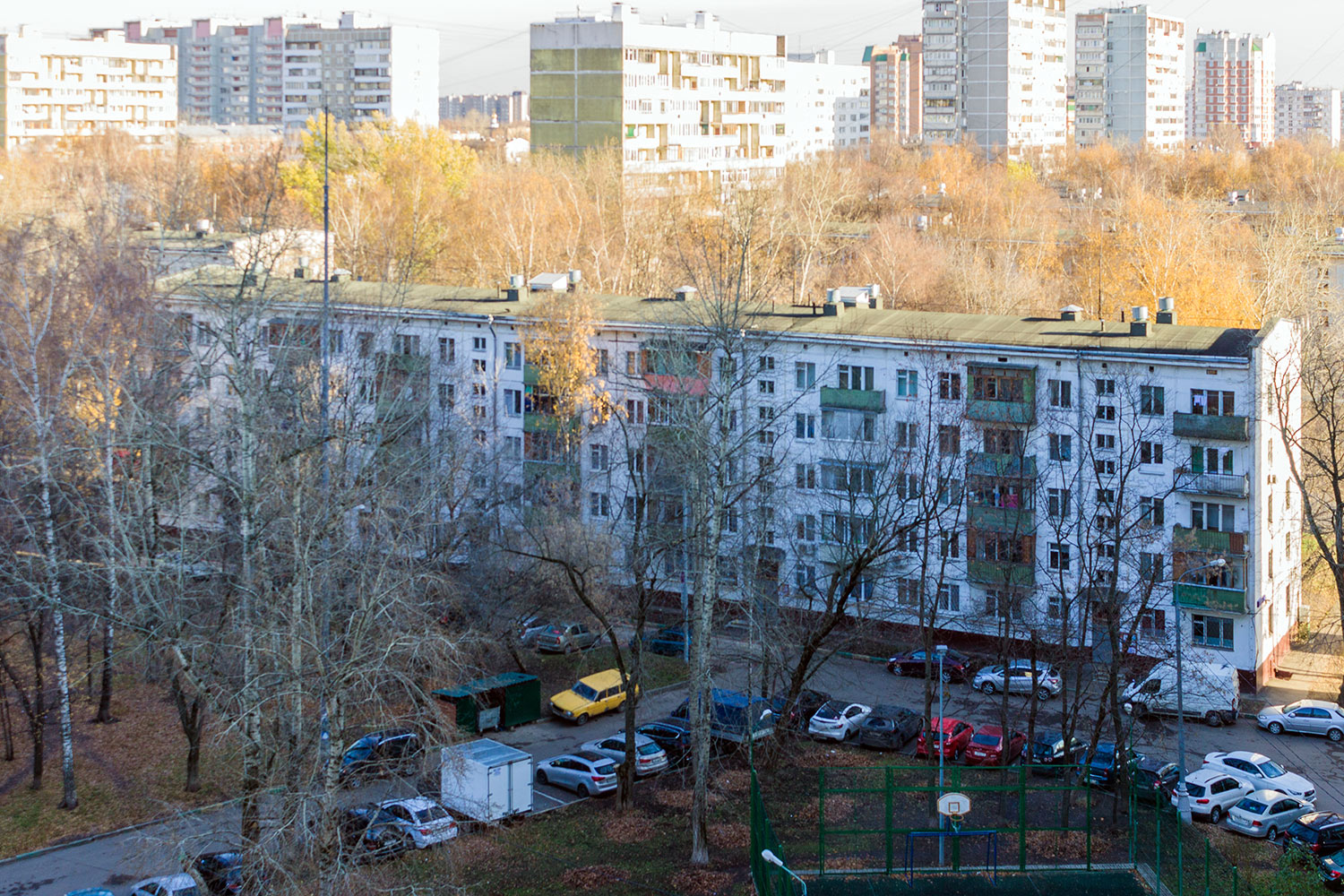
1-515/5. Moscow

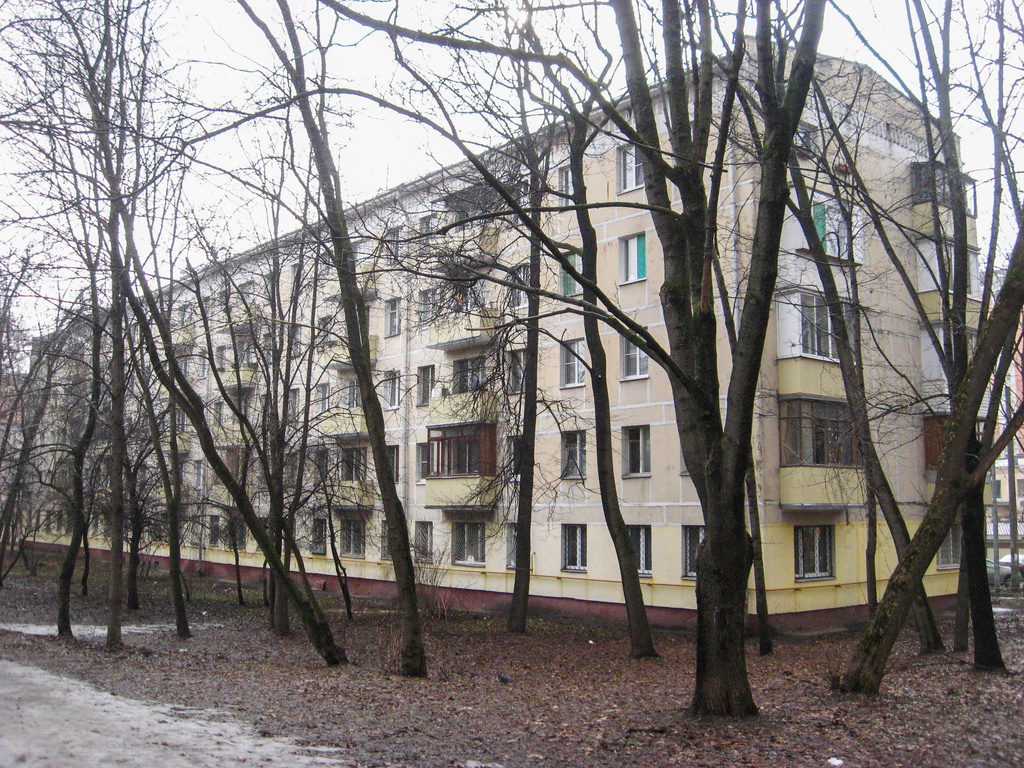
1-510. Moscow

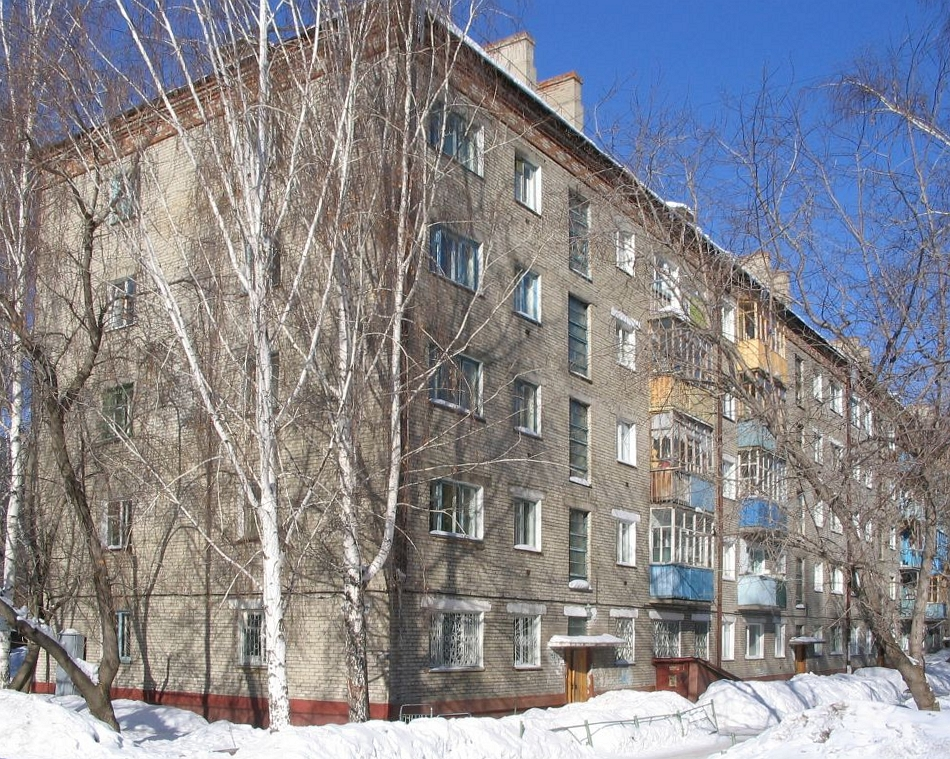
1-447. Tomsk

In addition to the K-7, another early series of panel houses was the 1-506, which was built in Leningrad from 1956 to 1960. However, these houses were designed according to older standards and featured full-size apartments with high ceilings. Also, in the mid-1950s, a frame-panel series, 1-335, was developed in Leningrad, which became widespread throughout the Soviet Union.

In July 1958, the USSR Council of Ministers issued a decree “On the Expansion of the Use of Standard Projects in Construction,” which aimed to minimize the variety of standard projects. In Moscow, it was proposed to build 5-story houses based on eight standard projects using a single standard section. In rural areas and small towns, houses of lower height were built. However, due to the weak industrial base, the introduction of prefabricated reinforced concrete into mass construction was slow. Therefore, series of houses with large block walls (1-439) and made of brick (1-447) were developed. The 1-447 series appeared in 1957 in Giprogor and spread across the country even before mass panel construction. It became one of the most widespread series, with numerous modifications, although it was not industrial. Finally, in 1959, the text of the seven-year plan approved prefabricated reinforced concrete as the foundation of modern industrial construction. Over the next 3-4 years, most of the country's house-building plants were established.

Between 1957 and 1963, four main structural schemes for large-panel residential buildings became the most common: those with transverse and longitudinal load-bearing walls with small spans (series 1-464, K-7-II, MG-300, etc.); with external load-bearing walls and internal frames (1-335); with three longitudinal load-bearing walls (1-439, 1-480); with transverse load-bearing walls and large spans (1-467, 1-468). The most common series were 1-464 and 1-335 (in 1961, of 89 plants in Russia, 67 were oriented towards the production of series 1-464, and 18 towards series 1-335). The 1-464 series, developed in the late 1950s under the leadership of N. P. Rozanov, featured closely spaced transverse and longitudinal load-bearing walls. This structural scheme had several advantages: it eliminated joints within the rooms, and the balance of the elements allowed for efficient use of cranes during installation. The series included one-, two-, and three-room apartments. Only combined bathrooms and a single kitchen type of 5.9 m² were included, which were inconvenient for larger apartments, and the functional layout of the three-room apartments had several drawbacks. In series 1-467, four-apartment sections with transverse load-bearing walls were used, with a large main span of 6.4 meters and an additional span of 3.2 meters. This structural scheme allowed for two-row cutting of the external walls and enlarged windows in the horizontal direction. Panel houses were designed for a service life of 25 years for the first series and 50 years for later ones.

Depending on the climatic and geological conditions, as well as the existing material and technical base, new series of residential buildings for single-family occupancy received various planning and structural solutions. In the central part of the country, four-apartment sections were primarily used, while for the southern republics, two- and three-apartment sections were developed, for example, in series 1-295 and 1-310. Each apartment in such series had a deep loggia connected to the living room and kitchen. Two- and three-room apartments featured cross-ventilation, while only one-room apartments were ventilated through the staircase. However, even these series did not fully consider the peculiarities of the southern climate and the daily habits of the population. Khrushchyovkas were also built beyond the Arctic Circle. Thanks to the Khrushchyovkas, it became possible to build military and industrial cities in remote areas.

The peak of housing construction occurred in 1960. That year, 82.8 million square meters of residential space were added, compared to 41 million square meters in 1956. Although a significant portion of the construction still consisted of brick houses from the 1-447 series, over time the share of panel housing grew, and other methods of industrial housing construction were also used, but they were less widespread. After 1960, there was a slight decline in the volume of housing construction, but in 1964, growth resumed.

Although construction progressed at a rapid pace, Khrushchev demanded even greater results. Assembly crews began competing for speed in erecting structures. For example, in Leningrad, a building was erected in just 5 days. Often, due to the rush, the quality of construction suffered. In search of even cheaper solutions, architects and engineers proposed using unconventional materials. For example, B. M. Iofan designed a building made entirely of plastic. Moscow allocated a site for him in South Izmailovo for experimentation.

Housing was built using funds from local enterprises and councils. Some homes were financed by ordinary citizens who gained the right to join housing cooperatives. They would contribute 15-30% of the cost of the home, and after moving in, they would pay the remaining amount at an interest rate of 0.5%. However, the share of cooperatives in construction did not exceed 10%. Geoffrey Hosking in A History of the Soviet Union writes that owning an apartment in a cooperative house became a symbol of an intermediate social status for Soviet citizens — between the privileged elite and ordinary workers, who depended on employers and local councils for housing. The housing issue was used as a tool of pressure on citizens. Marginal behavior or protest could lead to being moved to the end of the housing queue.

The panel house construction technology was also exported to countries within the socialist camp. With some modifications, Khrushchyovkas were built in Vietnam, China, and Cuba.

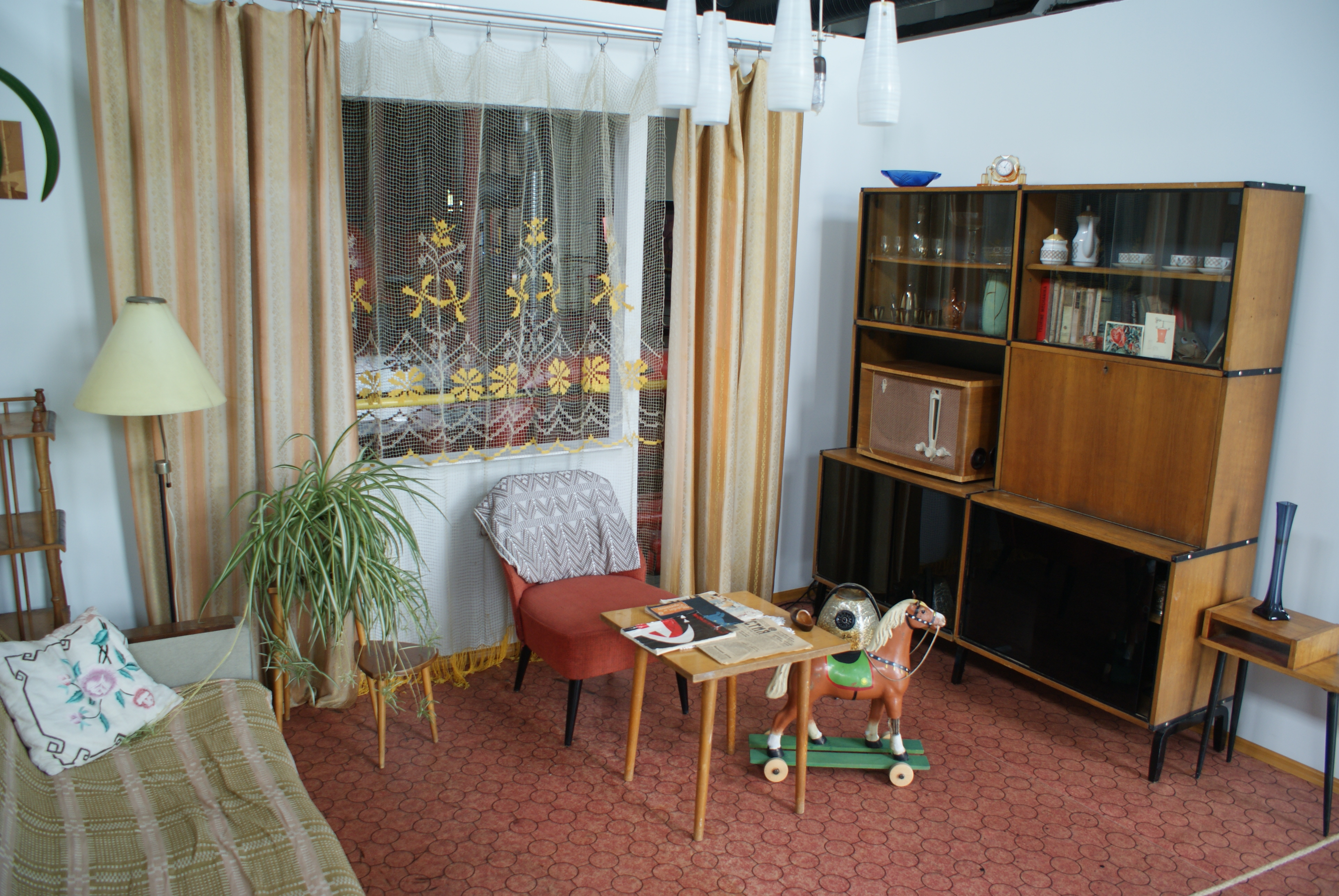
Reconstruction of the interior of a Khrushchev-era building. Lithuanian Energy and Technology Museum

By the late 1960s, Khrushchyovkas came under serious criticism for their small kitchens, corridor rooms, awkward proportions of certain rooms, combined bathrooms, lack of loggias, combined roofing without attics in most houses, poor sound insulation, low energy efficiency, and the monotonous and dreary appearance. Many factories mastered the production of only one or two types of houses, which could not ensure the complete development of residential neighborhoods and their expressive composition. Due to the insufficient study of industrial production, the potential for creating different textures for wall panels and using a broader color palette was underutilized. The architectural appearance of new construction was also significantly affected by the low quality of construction and finishing work, as well as incomplete landscaping. In professional circles, there was talk about the trauma of modernist changes to the historical urban environment. The characteristics of Khrushchyovkas increasingly became the subject of jokes, with people saying: "Khrushchyov joined the bathroom with the toilet but didn’t manage to join the floor with the ceiling."

Initially, it was assumed that the average service life of the first industrial series in construction would be five years. However, the transition to new series, which were only finalized by 1963–1964, was significantly delayed. Their construction began after Khrushchyov's resignation, in the second half of the 1960s, so these houses were already referred to as early Brezhnevkas. They featured separate bathrooms, loggias, more spacious kitchens, isolated rooms, an increased number of multi-room apartments, and trash chutes. The number of high-rise buildings increased, and many residential neighborhoods began to be developed with 9-story buildings. The construction became more varied in terms of height, length, and finishes. However, the construction of Khrushchyovkas continued for a long time, as replacing them with modern series required retooling house-building plants. In 1969, the Central Committee of the Communist Party of the Soviet Union and the Council of Ministers of the USSR issued a decree on “Measures to Improve the Quality of Housing and Civil Construction,” and the gradual phase-out of Khrushchyovkas began. In Moscow and other major Soviet cities, houses were still being built until 1972, and in the Moscow region and many parts of the country until the early 1980s. In Leningrad, the construction of Khrushchyovkas stopped in the 1970s, and they were replaced by so-called “ship houses.”

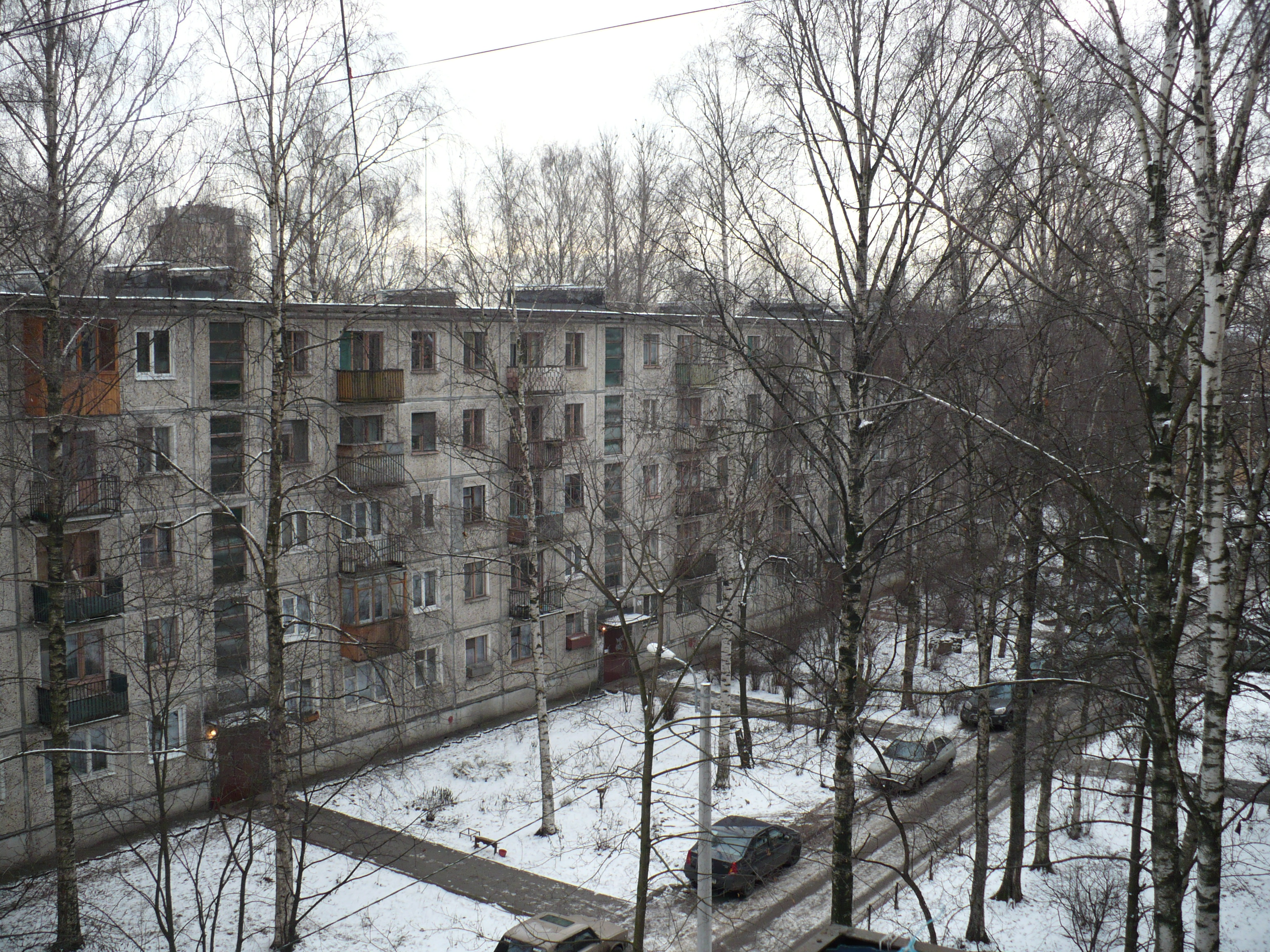
Khrushchev-era courtyard

Thanks to Khrushchyov's reforms, hundreds of millions of square meters of housing were built. The press of the time reported that from 1956 to 1963, the national housing stock nearly doubled — from 640 million to 1,184 million square meters, meaning that during this period, the USSR built more housing than in the previous 40 years. Other publications state that about 290 million square meters of Khrushchyovkas were built from 1959 to the early 1980s in Russia, which now makes up about 10% of the country's total housing stock. From 1954 to 1963, Moscow's housing stock increased by 36 million square meters. Millions of Soviet citizens moved into their own apartments from communal flats, barracks, basements, and dugouts. The right to individual housing with all conveniences began to dictate entirely new societal needs. However, the housing crisis was never fully overcome by Khrushchyov or subsequent leaders of the country.

Talking about the Khrushchyov reforms in construction, architectural historian D. S. Khmelnitsky summarizes:

“The government’s directive for the mass design of industrial housing led to a sharp change in urban planning principles, volumetric design, project institute systems, and architectural education.

<…>

This was a completely new, Khrushchyov-Brezhnev city, built on standard urban planning techniques, standard housing construction, and standard apartments for lower social strata. It differed fundamentally from the Stalinist city, which consisted of a ceremonial center with housing for privileged social classes and barrack settlements for workers. Under Khrushchyov, architecture returned to its social meaning, and the body of the city became mass residential housing for all. This was a revolutionary shift in the consciousness of both the Soviet leadership and Soviet architects.

<…>

Western architectural journals began to arrive in the USSR, and translated books were published. This quickly led to the revival of architectural education... Much worse was the practical implementation. By loosening stylistic constraints, Khrushchyov preserved the Stalinist system of design organization, which left no room for individual creativity."

Soviet architectural historian S. O. Khan-Magomedov, acknowledging that Khrushchyov’s reforms significantly improved housing conditions for the population and “returned Soviet architecture to the main road of world architecture,” notes many negative consequences. First, the priority of ready-made standard solutions, specifically large-panel constructions, negatively impacted the development of architecture and engineering — designers became unaccustomed to solving complex engineering tasks using monolithic reinforced concrete. Second, the struggle with “excesses,” which referred to any decorative elements and original compositions, was carried to the extreme, although factory-made decorative elements did not significantly increase construction costs. Third, despite a slight softening of the attitude toward the Soviet avant-garde heritage, its developments remained inaccessible to a wide circle of architects. Khan-Magomedov wrote:

Overall, in architecture after 1955, both in practice and theory, blatant utilitarianism prevailed, which artistically drained our architecture for several decades, and architectural theory and criticism declined.

Architectural candidate and urbanist V. E. Stadnikov notes that the popularity of depressing high-rise microdistricts in Russia originated with Khrushchyovka construction:

On one hand, the program was very successful, as never before in the history of our country had such a massive relocation of people into individual housing occurred in such a short time (20-30 years). At the same time, this led to monstrous consequences regarding the quality of the urban environment that was formed and, accordingly, to serious social consequences.

=== Brezhnevka ===
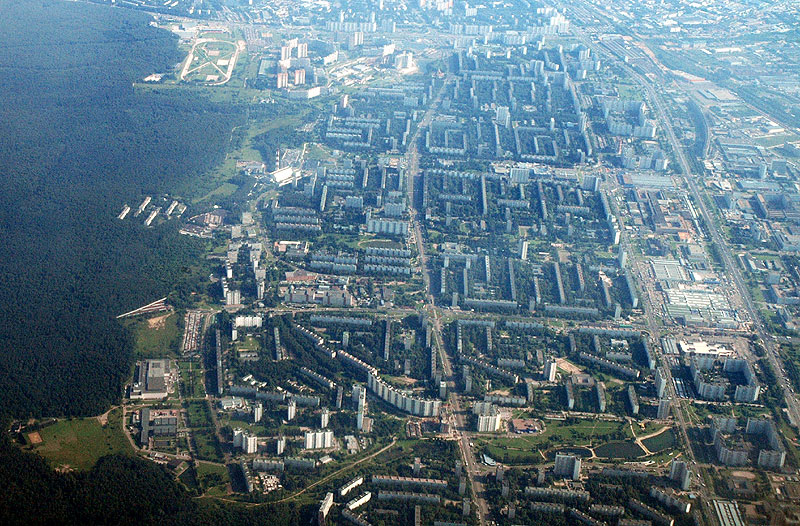
Chertanovo. View from the plane

"Brezhnevkas" (colloquial, by analogy with Stalinkas and Khrushchevkas) is the name of a series of houses built in the USSR and Russia from 1965 to 1999, mainly during the reign of Leonid Brezhnev.

The peak of construction of "Brezhnevkas" was from the late 1960s to the early 1990s. They were built from reinforced concrete panels or sand-lime bricks, less often from blocks. The reason for the launch of "Brezhnevkas" was the growth of complaints from the population about the quality of housing. The delight of getting your own "Khrushchevka" gradually dissipated, and a compromise was eventually found - "Brezhnevka". Since the early 1990s, "Brezhnevkas" began to displace more modern series of houses and multi-story buildings built according to individual projects with even more improved layouts.

Often, the word "Brezhnevka" refers to 9-story and 10-story panel houses that were built en masse in the 1970s, 1980s and 1990s in the USSR, and then in the countries of the former USSR, since this was the most common type of "Brezhnevka" houses being built, despite the fact that there were many varieties of "Brezhnevkas".

With the start of construction of mass standard housing and due to the fact that in the early 1960s, the issuance of loans for individual housing construction in cities was canceled, the share of this method of solving the housing issue began to decline: in 1981-1986, it accounted for only 6.2% of the new housing stock, or 19.2 million m². out of 308.7 million built.

Housing was built using funds from local enterprises and councils. There were houses built with money from ordinary citizens who were given the right to join housing cooperatives. The initial payment was 15-30% of the cost of housing, and the rest was paid after moving in at a rate of 0.5% per annum. However, the share of cooperatives in construction did not exceed 10%. Geoffrey Hosking writes in his History of the Soviet Union that owning an apartment in a cooperative house for a Soviet citizen became, in a way, a symbol of an intermediate social status - between the privileged elite and ordinary workers who depended on employers and local councils for housing. However, in order to purchase a cooperative apartment, one also had to stand in line to improve housing conditions, but it moved faster and there were no such restrictions on area: for money, one could afford additional living space. The housing issue was used to motivate citizens. For example, one could get an apartment faster for merits in labor or for participating in important state projects.

=== Housing 2000 program ===
In early 1986, future USSR President Mikhail Gorbachev promised that by the year 2000, every Soviet family would live in a separate apartment or house. At the same time, the USSR State Program "Housing-2000" was adopted.

Calculations by the USSR Gosstroy showed that in order for each family in the country to live separately, it was necessary to have an average housing provision of 22.0-22.5 square meters per person.

At that time, the average housing provision was 14.6 square meters per person. To fill the existing gap, it was necessary to build 2190-2250 million square meters of living space in 15 years.

In the period from 1986 to 1990, 650 million square meters were built. The average housing provision increased from 14.6 to 16.5 square meters per person. Then the collapse of the USSR began, and the pace of construction significantly decreased. Over the next ten years, only 380 million square meters of housing were put into operation, or 38% of the volumes envisaged by the program. By 2001, new housing only half covered the decommissioned housing stock.
