= Residential building series =

Types of apartment buildings

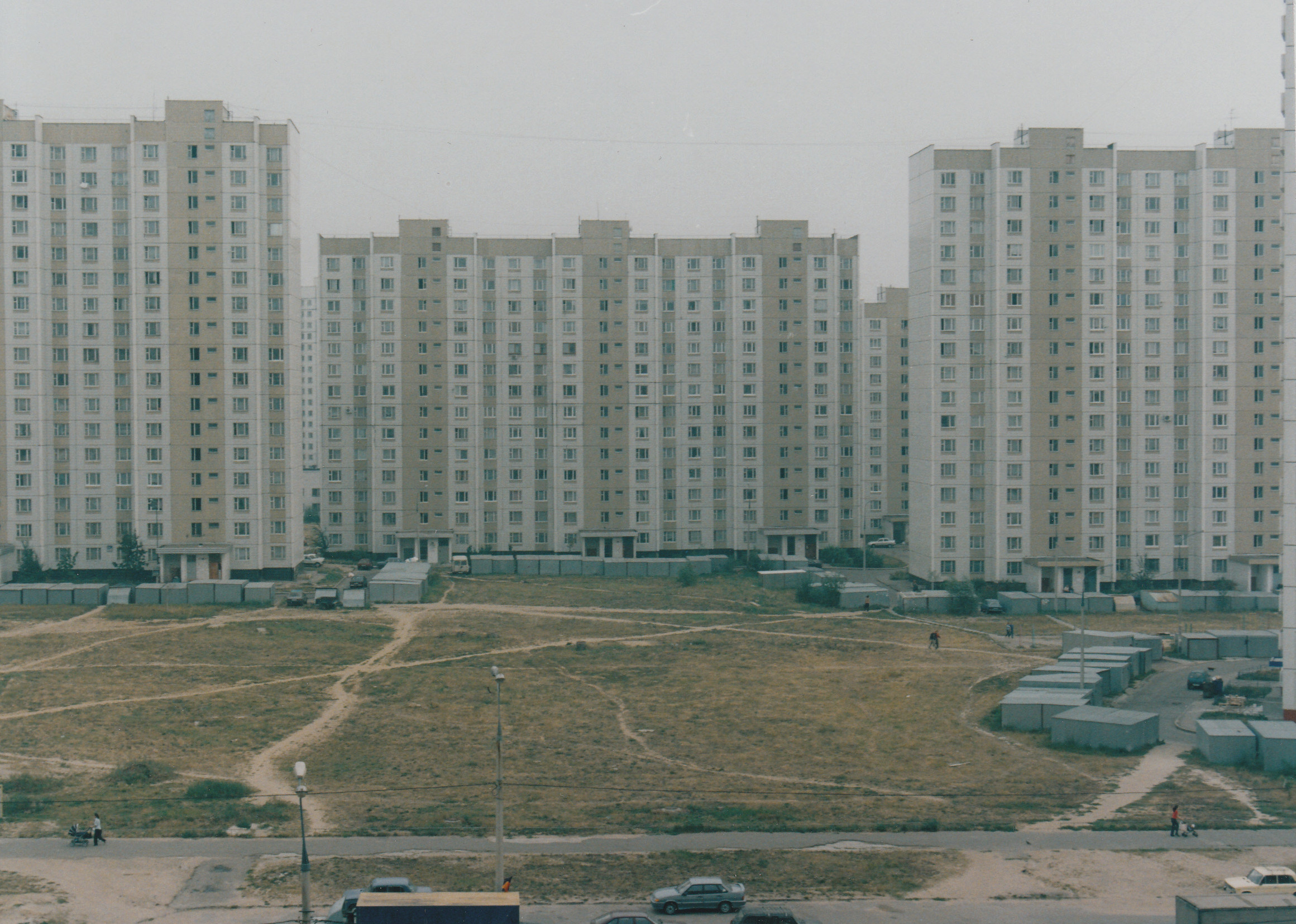
Standard buildings on Novokosinskaya street, Moscow, Russia, the 1980s

Series of residential buildings are residential structures built according to a standardized group of typical designs, which within a given series may vary in the number of floors, number of sections, orientation, and minor architectural finishing details. As a rule, a residential building series features a limited range of apartment layouts, a unified architectural style, and a consistent construction technology. The use of standardized designs is aimed at industrializing construction, allowing for the lowest possible cost per square meter of housing while ensuring high construction speed. However, this often results in architectural uniformity and a lack of diversity in residential neighborhoods.

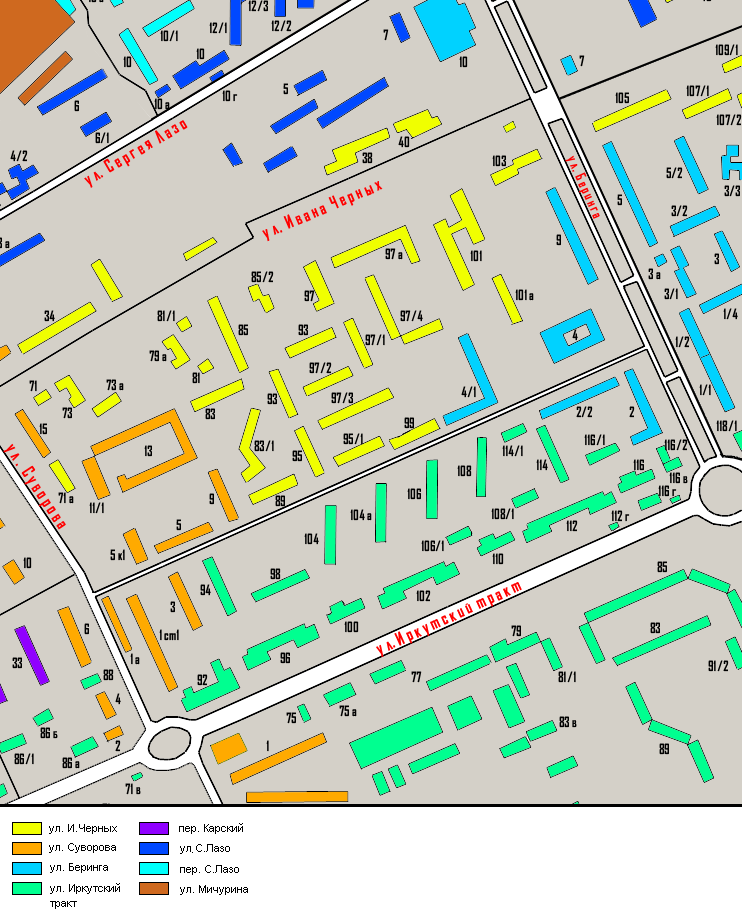
Houses of standard series on the map of the 2nd microdistrict of Tomsk, Russia

Such buildings were most extensively constructed during urbanization periods in many countries, shaping the architectural appearance of residential districts in numerous cities. Series-based apartment building design saw its greatest development in the USSR during the era of mass post-war housing construction, was widely adopted in socialist and developing countries, and continues to be used today.

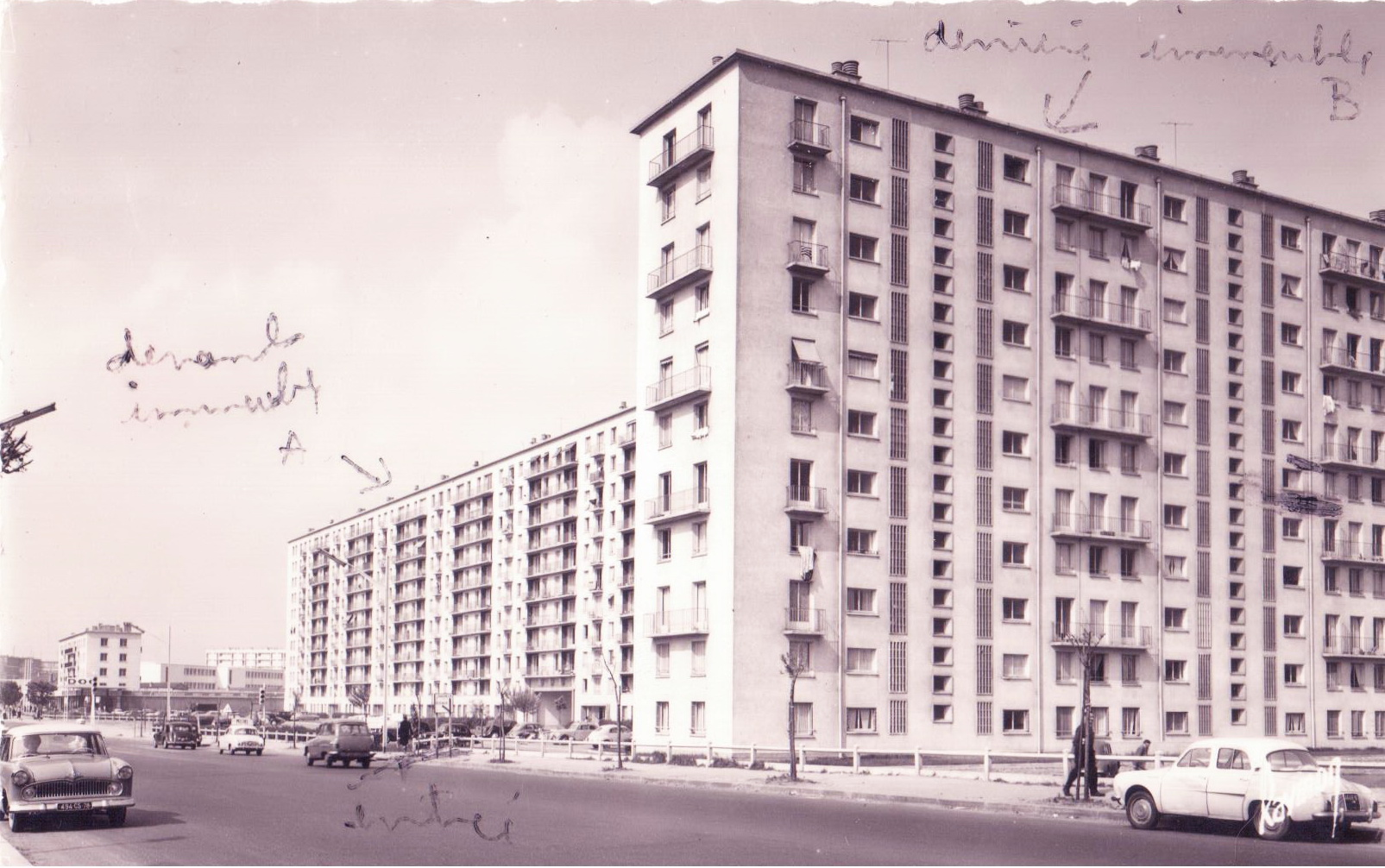
Bagneux neighborhood near Paris, France

Based on the materials used for load-bearing and exterior enclosing structures, series-built houses can be classified as reinforced concrete, cinder block, or brick. In standardized construction of individual houses, wood and various wood-based panels were also used. Reinforced concrete structures, depending on construction technology, can be block-based, panel-based, monolithic, or precast-monolithic.

== History ==
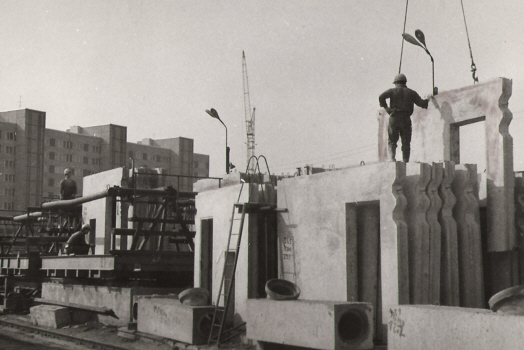
Block buildings built in the GDR

Standardized housing design has evolved from typical projects that historically developed in different countries and among various peoples, optimally accounting for traditions, lifestyles, climate conditions, availability of building materials, family wealth, and other factors.

=== France ===
In France, for the "Autumn Salon" exhibition of 1922, Édouard Le Corbusier and Pierre Jeanneret presented the project "A Contemporary City for 3 Million Inhabitants," which proposed a new vision of the city of the future. This project was later transformed into the "Plan Voisin" (1925), an advanced proposal for the radical redevelopment of Paris.

The Plan Voisin envisioned the construction of a new business center for Paris on a completely cleared site, requiring the demolition of 240 hectares of old buildings. According to the plan, eighteen identical 50-story office skyscrapers were to be freely spaced at sufficient distances from each other. Despite the scale of the project, only 5% of the land was to be built upon, with the remaining 95% allocated for roads, parks, and pedestrian areas. The Plan Voisin was widely discussed in the French press and became something of a sensation. In 1924, at the request of industrialist Henry Frugès, Le Corbusier designed and built the "Quartiers Modernes Frugès" in Pessac, near Bordeaux. This residential complex, consisting of 50 two- and three-story houses, was one of the first attempts at mass-produced housing construction in France. The project featured four types of buildings differing in configuration and layout, including ribbon houses, row houses, and freestanding homes. With this project, Le Corbusier sought to create a formula for a modern, affordable home—characterized by simple forms, ease of construction, and a contemporary level of comfort.

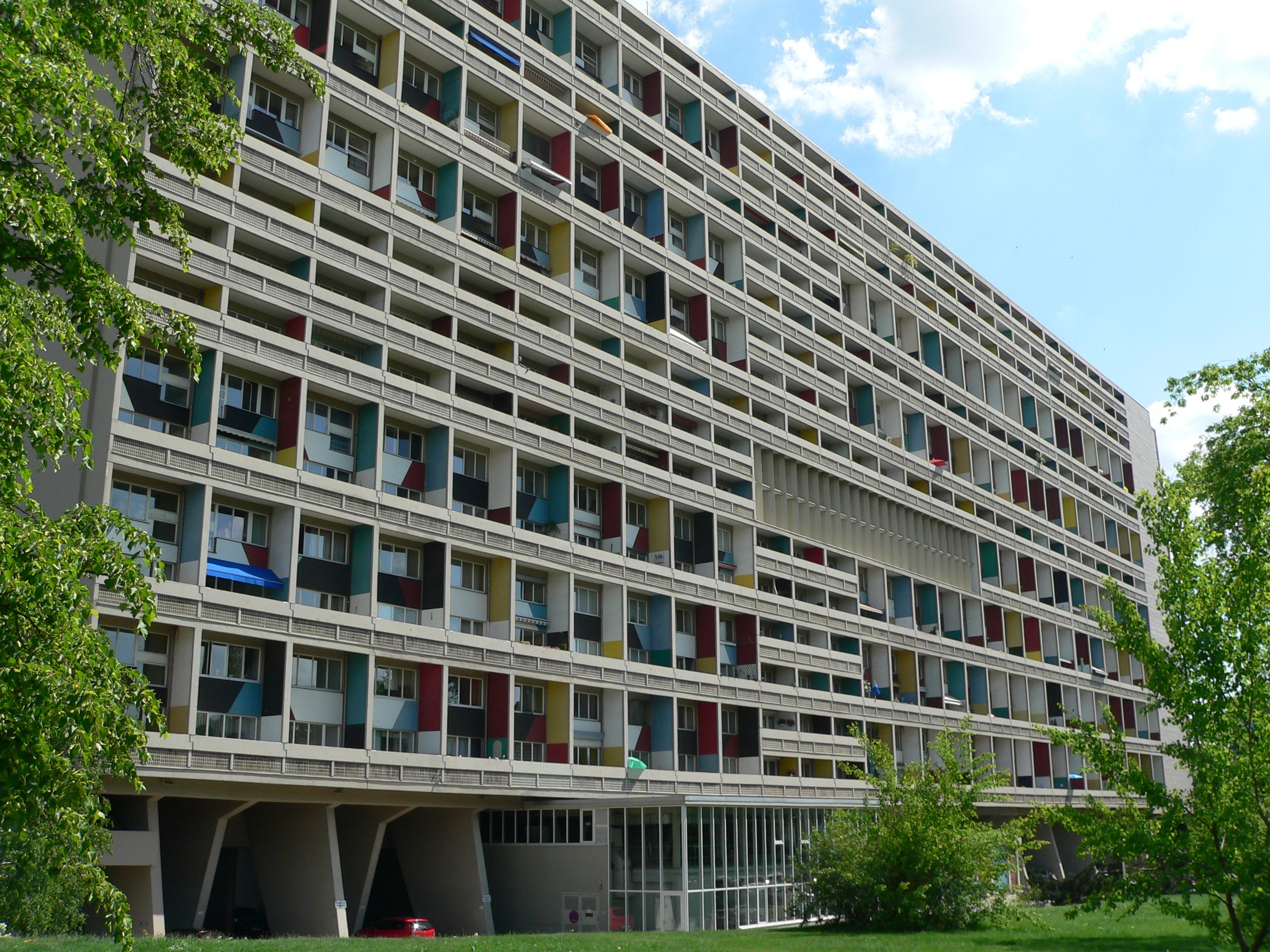
Unité d'Habitation Typ Berlin

At the 1925 International Exhibition of Modern Decorative and Industrial Arts in Paris, Le Corbusier designed the "Esprit Nouveau" pavilion. The pavilion included a full-scale residential unit of a multi-story apartment building—an experimental two-level apartment. Le Corbusier later used a similar unit in the late 1940s for his Unité d'Habitation in Marseille. Also called The Marseille block (1947–1952) is a large multi-unit residential building situated on a spacious green plot. For this project, Le Corbusier used standardized duplex apartments with balconies facing both sides of the building. Inside, at its mid-height, was a communal service complex: a cafeteria, library, post office, grocery stores, and more. The balconies' enclosing walls were painted in bright primary colors—polychromy—on an unprecedented scale. Similar Unités d’Habitation (with some modifications) were later built in cities such as Nantes-Rezé (1955), Meaux (1960), Briey-en-Forêt (1961), Firminy (1968) in France, and in West Berlin (1957). These structures embodied Le Corbusier's concept of the "Radiant City"—a city designed for human well-being.

=== India and Brazil ===
In 1950, at the invitation of the Indian authorities in the state of Punjab, Le Corbusier began the most ambitious project of his career—the design of the new state capital, Chandigarh. As in the Marseille block, the exterior finishing utilized a special technique for treating concrete surfaces known as "béton brut" (French for "raw concrete"). This technique, which became a hallmark of Le Corbusier’s style, was later adopted by many architects across Europe and beyond, leading to the emergence of the architectural movement known as "Brutalism." Brutalism became particularly widespread in the United Kingdom (especially in the 1960s) and the USSR (especially in the 1980s). By the early 1980s, Western Europe was swept by a wave of protests against this type of architecture. Over time, Brutalism came to be seen as embodying the worst aspects of modern architecture—alienation from human needs, soullessness, claustrophobia, etc.—and its popularity declined.

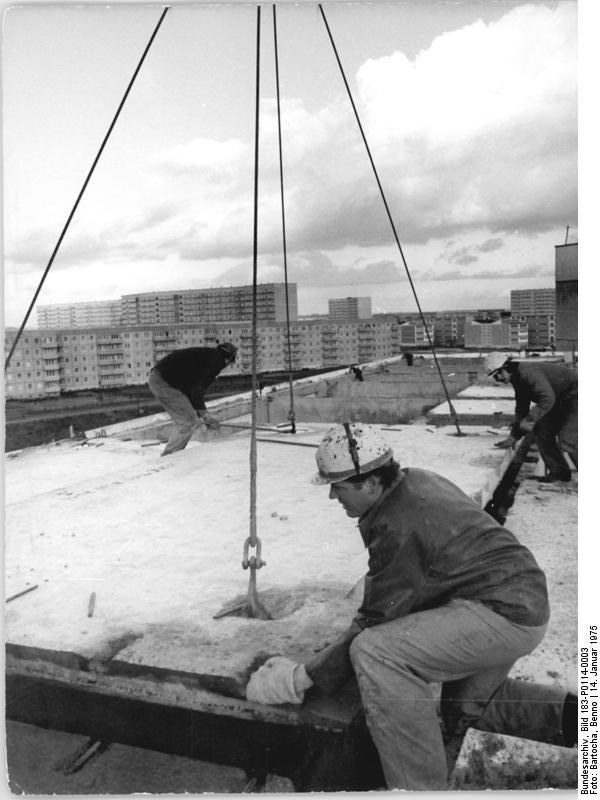
Construction work in East Germany

The planned city of Brasília, the capital of Brazil, was built as a realization of Le Corbusier's vision and includes some of the most famous examples of standardized residential buildings designed by him in the 1920s–1940s.

=== Soviet Union ===
Pre-war period

After the 1917 revolutions in Russia, a housing redistribution began. Rich apartments, which had fewer residents than rooms, were requisitioned and redistributed to the poor, as industrialization progressed and people moved from rural areas to cities. In Moscow, the number of working-class families within the Garden Ring increased dramatically between 1917 and 1920. Due to the housing stock being inadequate for the new social conditions, communal apartments became common.

To address the housing shortage, various new housing types were proposed, including communal houses, though they were unsuccessful. Standard designs for two-story block houses and manor-type houses were developed. From 1924, sectional construction was revived, and in 1925, Moscow saw its first standard residential section for multi-story buildings. However, housing policies were inconsistent, and many new apartments were either inconvenient or too large, resulting in communal living.

During the first five-year plans, the population grew rapidly, and there was a need for mass housing construction. New design organizations emerged, and prefabricated housing technologies were developed. In 1936, the government issued a resolution to streamline construction, leading to standardized buildings. By 1939-1940, national projects for low-rise buildings were created, with a focus on multi-apartment sections. Construction volumes increased significantly during this period.

By 1940, all housing construction was focused on standard designs for industrial construction. The focus shifted from individual houses to large residential blocks, districts, and villages with supporting infrastructure. However, multi-story buildings began to be replaced by low-rise buildings due to a new government resolution promoting the use of local materials for construction.

Post-war period

During the Great Patriotic War, there was a sharp increase in the scale and volume of standardized housing design and construction, as housing was needed to accommodate evacuated industrial enterprises in the east. It was during this time that architectural design studios developed simple, cost-effective housing projects with minimal use of scarce materials for Siberia, the Far East, and Central Asia in a short period of time.

In the USSR, the forerunners of future mass construction based on industrial blocks and panels were cinder block "Stalinka". The architecture of these buildings is utilitarian, there are no decorations, unplastered silicate brick for external walls, almost flat facades with standard stucco decoration. The first four-story frame-panel house in the USSR was built in 1948 in Moscow at 43 Budyonny Avenue (architects G. Kuznetsov, B. Smirnov). At that time, the country's leadership set the task for builders to create the cheapest possible project of a residential building with the possibility of family settlement.

The first stage of fulfilling this task was the implementation of the idea of industrial panel house construction with a load-bearing frame. In 1948-1951, Mikhail Posokhin, Ashot Mndoyants and Vitaly Lagutenko built up a quarter in Moscow (Kuusinena, Zorge streets) with 10-story frame-panel houses. In the same year, a project for a frameless panel house was developed (they have been under construction since 1950 in Magnitogorsk). In 1954, a 7-story frameless panel house was built in Moscow on 6th street October Field (G. Kuznetsov, B. Smirnov, L. Wrangel, Z. Nesterova, N. A. Osterman). Khrushchevkas, which had been designed since the late 1940s, went into production after the State Committee for Construction 1955 decree “On elimination of excesses in design and construction”:

“the outwardly ostentatious side of architecture, replete with great excesses,” characteristic of the Stalinist period, now “does not correspond to the line of the Party and the Leadership in architectural and construction matters. … Soviet architecture should be characterized by simplicity, rigor of forms, and economy of solutions”.

The ideological and scientific justification for the new course was reduced to the following points:

- the communal apartment was not a project of the Soviet government, but was the result of cost savings during industrialization;
- the residence of several families in one apartment is abnormal and a social problem;
- communal apartments are an economically unprofitable type of housing that does not meet modern requirements;
- The problem of communal apartments can be solved through mass construction using new technologies.

The turning point was the resolutions "On measures for further industrialization, improving the quality and reducing the cost of construction" of 1956 and "On the development of housing construction in the USSR" of 1957. The party's task for builders was to develop projects by the fall of 1956 that would drastically reduce the cost of housing construction and make it accessible to workers. This is how the famous "Khrushchevka" appeared. The goal of the project was that in 1980 every Soviet family would meet communism in a separate apartment.

However, in the mid-1980s, only 85% of families had separate apartments. In 1986, Mikhail Gorbachev postponed the deadline for 15 years, putting forward the slogan "Every Soviet family - a separate apartment by the year 2000."

In 1959, the 21st Congress noted the existence of a housing problem and called the development of housing construction "one of the most important tasks." It was planned that in 1959-1965. 2.3 times more apartments would be commissioned than in the previous seven-year period. Moreover, the emphasis was placed on individual, not communal, apartments. The prototype for the first "Khrushchev" was the block buildings German: Plattenbau, which were built in Berlin and Dresden from the 1920s. The construction of "Khrushchev" continued from 1959 to 1985.

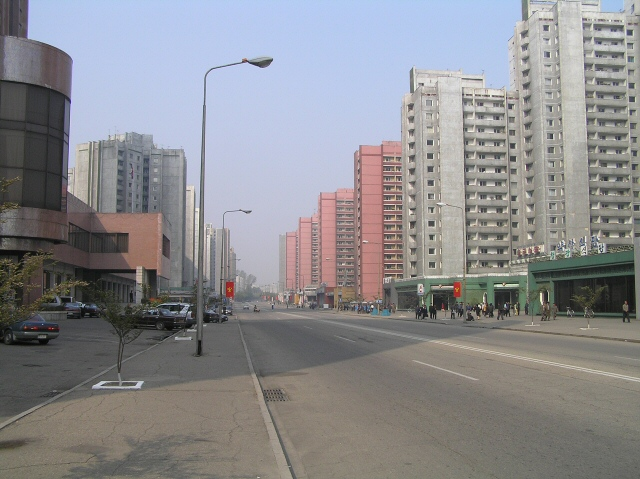
Changwang Street in Pyongyang, North Korea

In 1956-1965, more than 13 thousand residential buildings were built in the USSR, and almost all of them were five-story buildings. This allowed to commission 110 million square meters of housing each year. An appropriate production base and infrastructure were created: house-building plants, reinforced concrete plants, etc. The first house-building plants were created in 1959 in the Glavleningradbuda system, and in 1962 they were organized in Moscow and other cities. In particular, during the period 1966-1970, 942 thousand people in Leningrad received living space, with 809 thousand moving into new houses and 133 thousand receiving space in old houses. Since 1960, construction of 9-story panel residential houses has been underway, and since 1963 - 12-story ones.

=== Europe ===
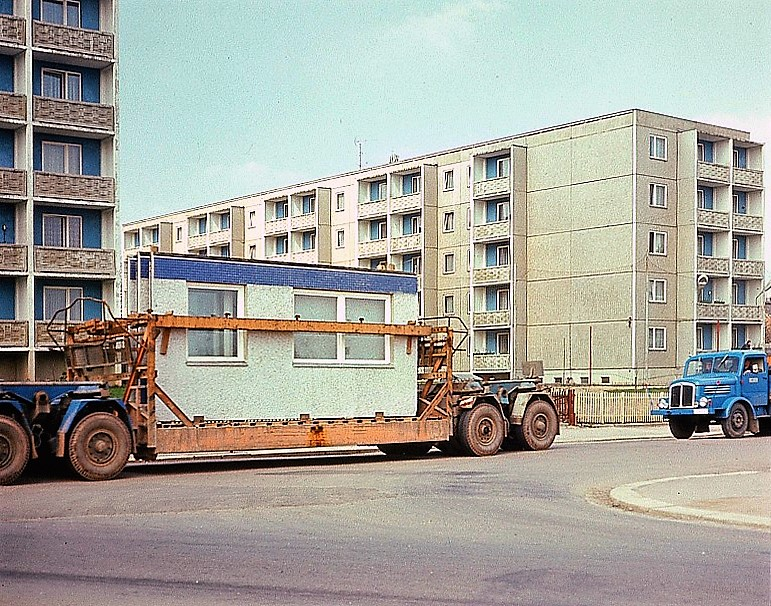
Chemnitz, 1975

The Soviet model of prefabricated panel buildings influenced housing projects in other socialist and developing countries. For instance, in East Germany, similar structures known as "Plattenbau" were constructed, "Panelház" in Hungary, "Panelák" in the Czech Republic, while in Poland, they were referred to as "Wielka Płyta."

== See also ==
- Urban planning in communist countries
- Panel buildings in Russia
- Social housing
- Tenement house
- Barracks - In the USSR, barracks were one of the main types of workers' housing before the start of mass housing construction.
- Russian architecture
- International style
- Brutalism
- Pruitt-Igoe residential complex in St. Louis, Missouri, USA
- Industrial Tourism
- Modular buildings
- Panelhaz — a series of residential buildings in Hungary
- Panelak — a series of residential buildings in Czechoslovakia
