= Panel buildings in Russia =

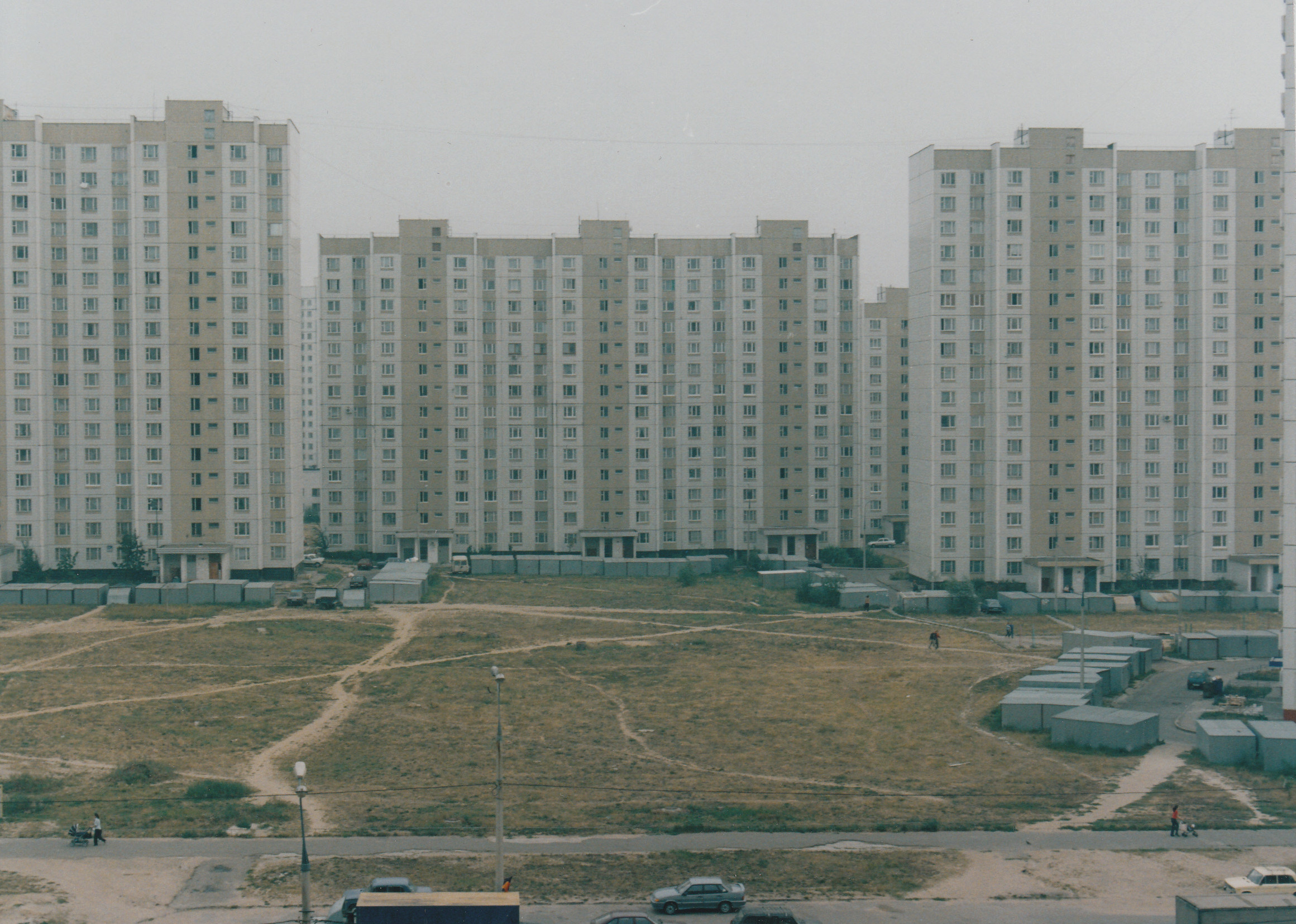
One type of panel building series on Novokosinskaya Street, Moscow, built in the 1980s (photo of the 2000s)

In Russia, the systematic construction of large panel system buildings (Russian: Панельное домостроение Panel'noye domostroyeniye, romanized: Panel'noye domostroyeniye Panel'noye domostroyeniye or panely dom) began in the former Soviet Union and continues in modern Russia to provide fast and cheap housing.

This approach was first implemented in the Soviet Union to address housing shortages, leading to the development of standardized series of buildings. Notable historical types include khrushchevkas and brezhnevkas, named after the respective Soviet leaders under whom they were widely built. These structures were initially intended to supplement the more elaborate Stalin-era (Stalinkas) buildings and communal apartments (multifamily apartments), which had previously dominated Soviet urban housing.

== Khrushchyovka ==
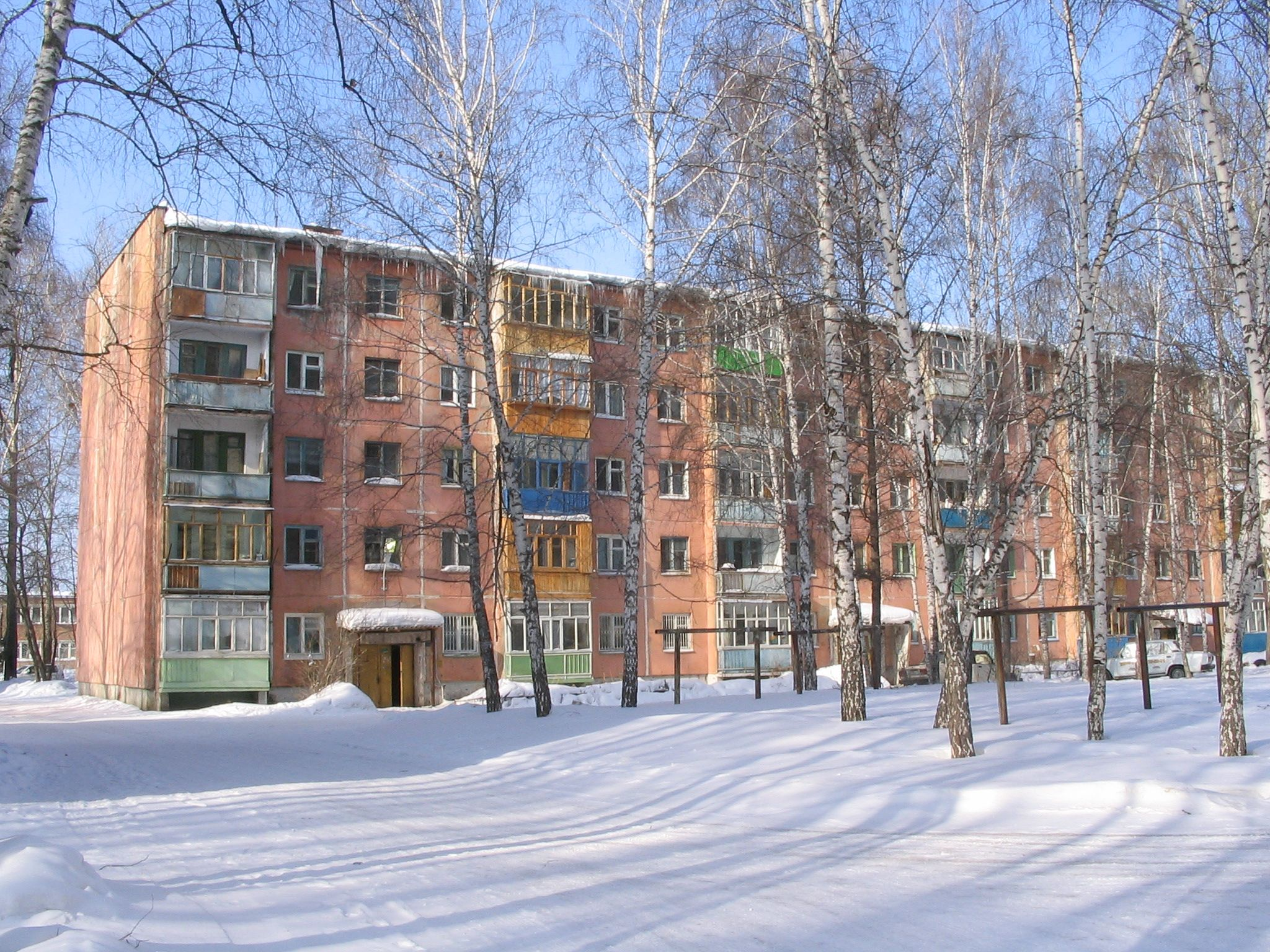
Panel khrushchevka in Tomsk

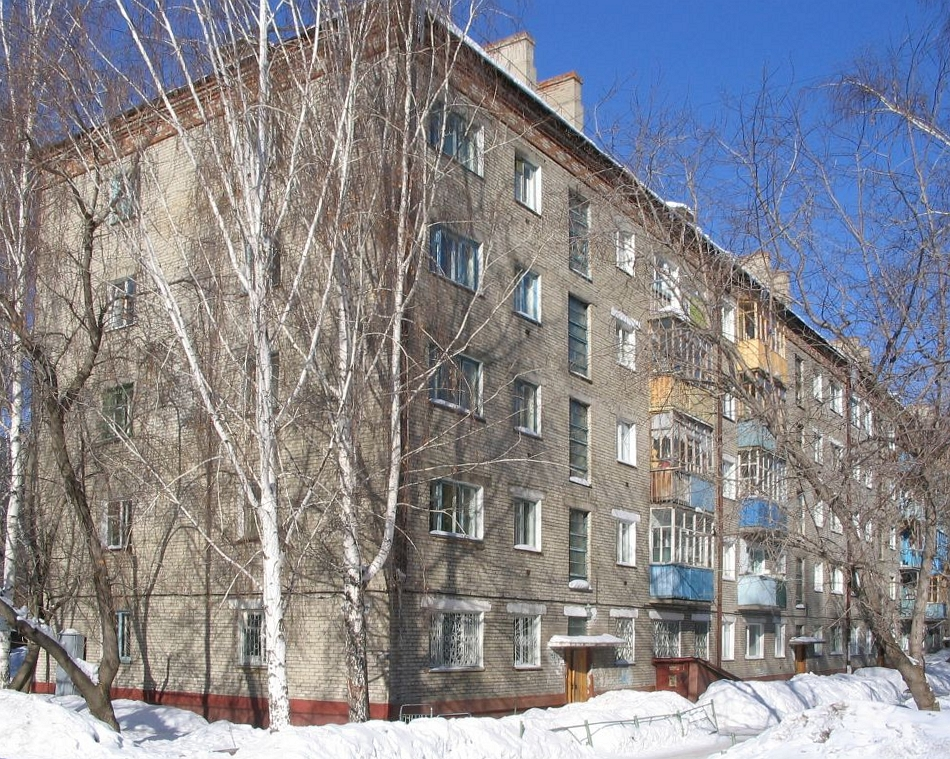
Brick khrushchevka in Tomsk

A khrushchevka (Russian: хрущёвка, romanized: khrushchyovka, IPA: [xrʊˈɕːɵfkə]) is a type of low-cost, concrete-paneled or brick three- to five-storied apartment building which was developed in the Soviet Union during the early 1960s, during the time its namesake Nikita Khrushchev directed the Soviet government. Khrushchevkas are sometimes compared to the Japanese danchi, similar (often government-sponsored) housing projects from the same period, which by some accounts were directly inspired by them. Preceding this type of housing, the majority of the Soviet housing stock was of low-rise communal apartments. Khrushchevka"s had from two to five floors.

The Soviet government developed khrushchevka apartments as part of self-contained microdistrict (Russian: микрорайо́н, mikrorajón En:microraion), which contain green areas, playgrounds, schools, shops, medical offices, transport infrastructure, and more.

== Brezhnevka ==
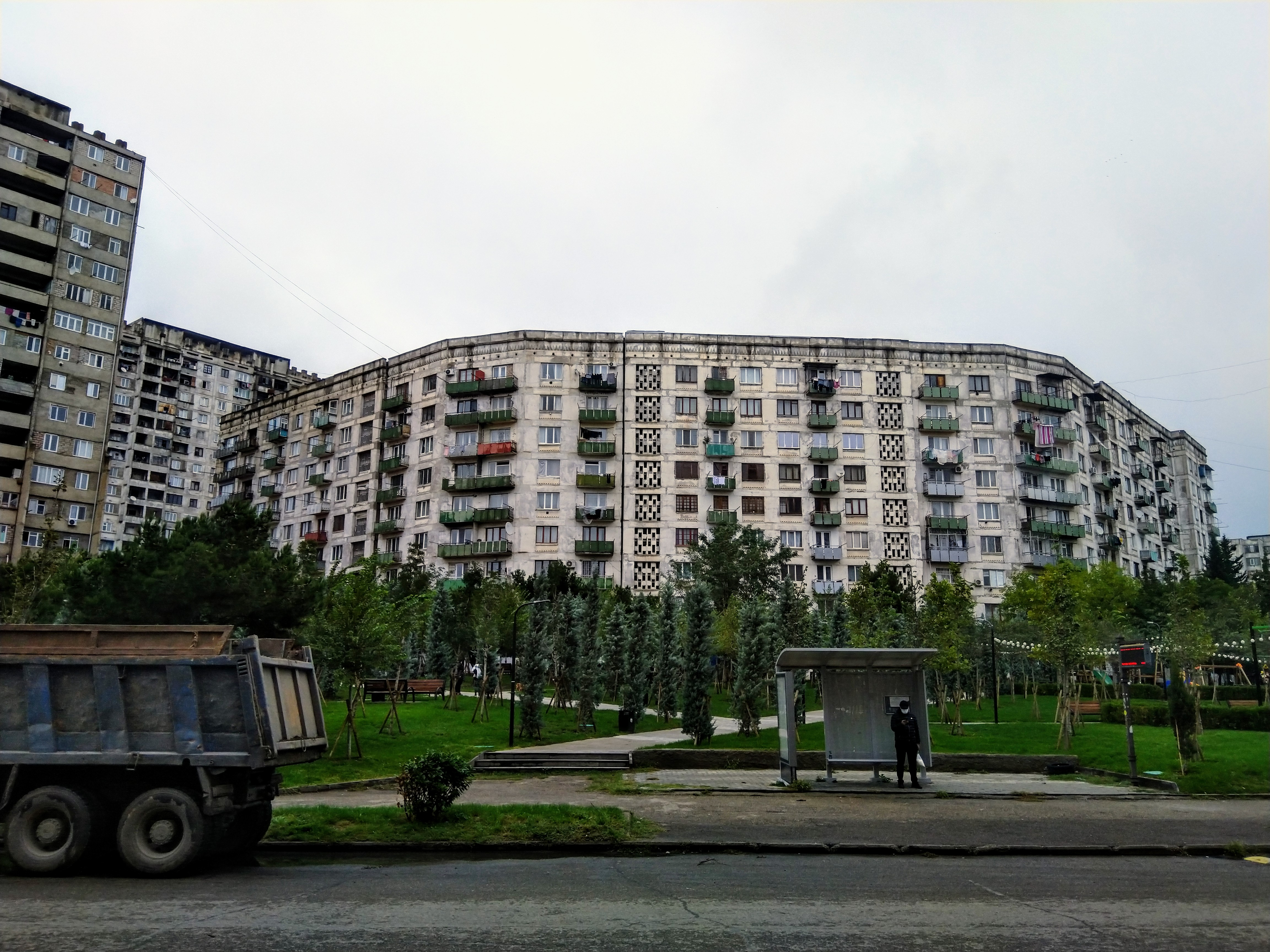
In Varketili district of Tbilisi the mainstay of the apartment buildings are Brezhnevka buildings

A brezhnevka, (Ru:Брежневка) is a panel or brick apartment building that was built in the Soviet Union from 1960–1980 under the leadership of Leonid Brezhnev, after whom the building type is named. The brezhnevka originated because of a desire for an update to the khrushchevka. As the needs of the population increased, so did the need to build updated housing. There are about 40 series of the brezhnevka. Common nine story versions are referred to as 'девятиэтажка' ('devyatietazhka', literally 'nine-storeyer').
