= Stalinka =

Type of Soviet housing popularized under Stalin

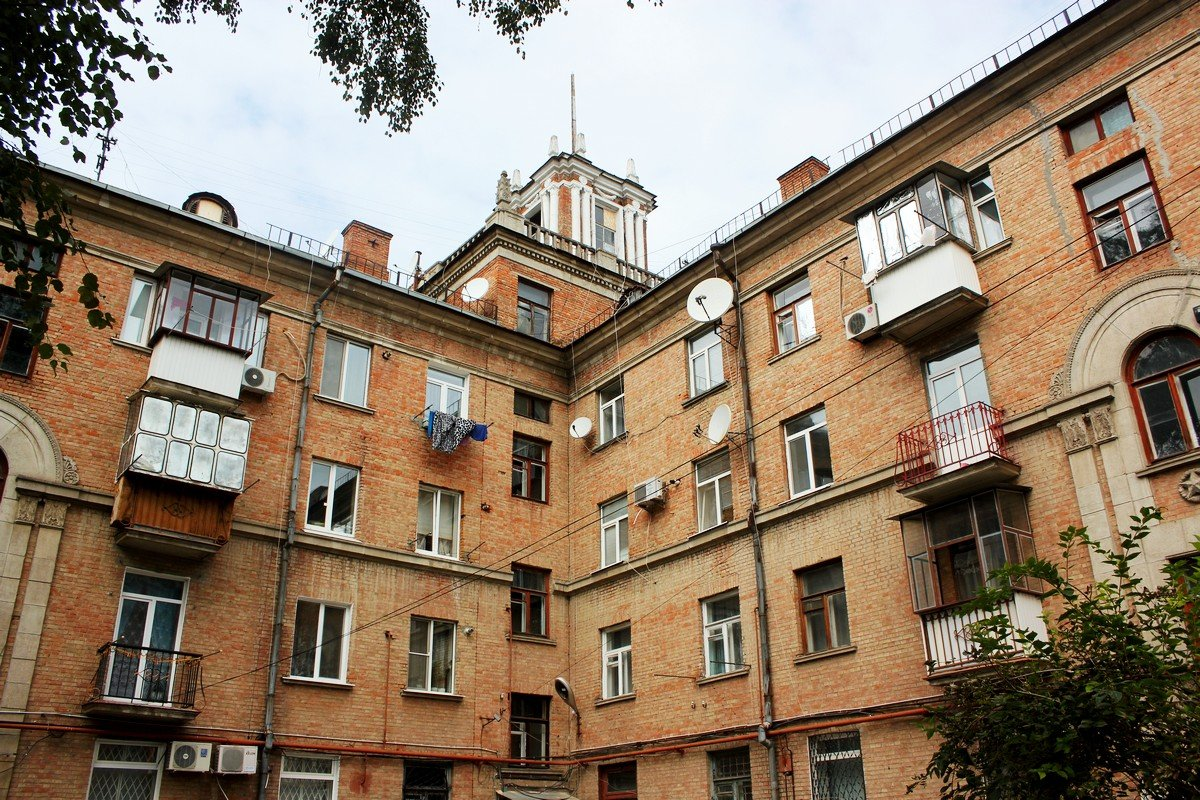
Stalin's Empire style in Nikopol, Ukraine

Stalinka, Stalinist apartment buildings or Stalin-era buildings, are a common colloquial term for apartment buildings constructed in the USSR from 1933 to 1961, primarily during the rule of Joseph Stalin. They were predominantly built in the neoclassical style (Stalinist Classical). Stalinkas are solidly constructed multi-apartment buildings with full utilities, featuring non-combustible materials and typically at least two stories high.

The term Stalinka does not include other types of residential buildings from Stalin's era, such as barracks, brick houses without utilities, or single-story individual or semi-detached houses.

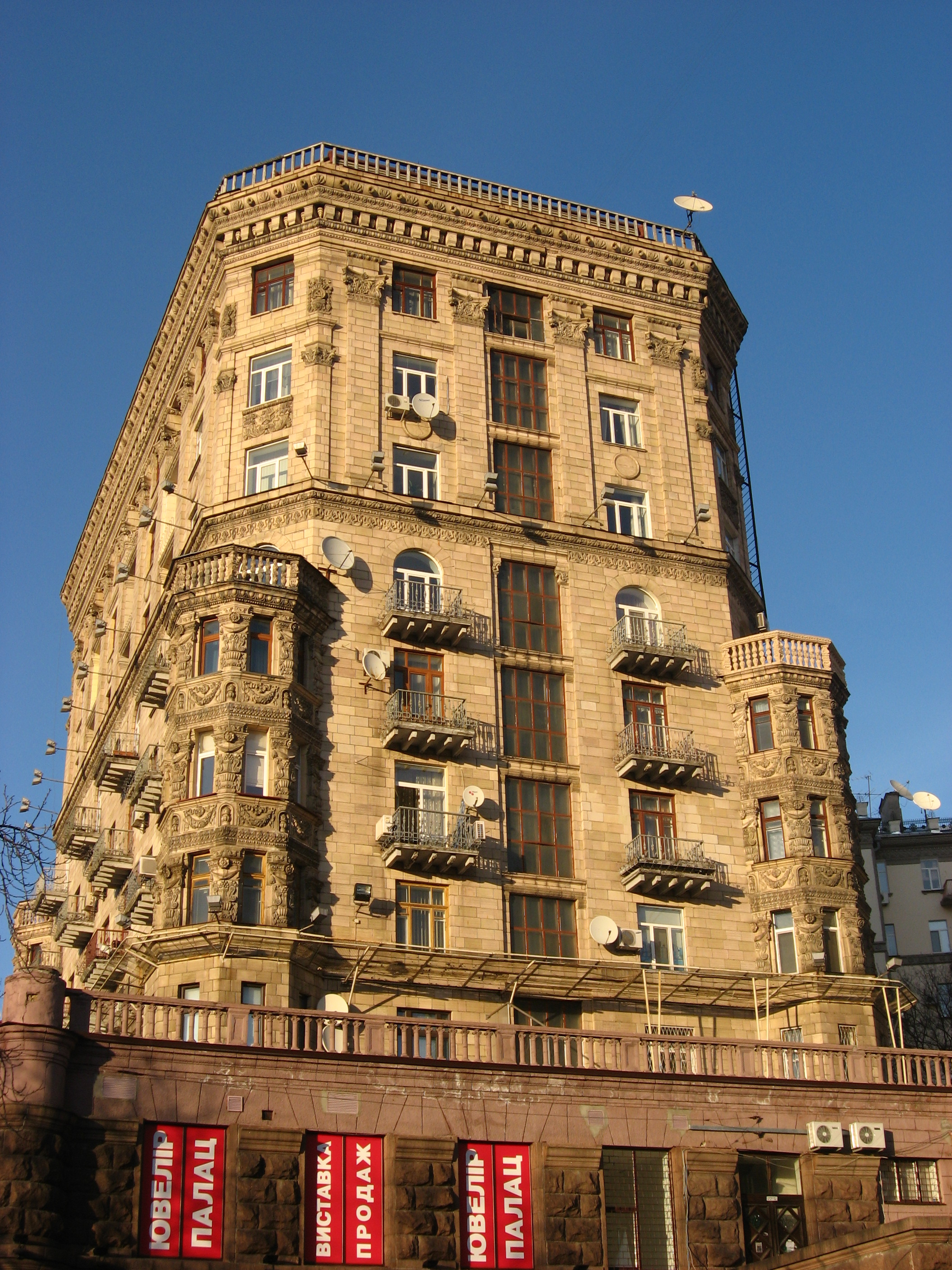
House on Khreshchatyk Street, Kyiv

Stalinkas were well-built, spacious, and prestigious. Typically located on central streets, stalinkas were primarily constructed for Soviet elites—party top members, Soviet prominent workers, intelligentsia, academics, military authorities, writers, and actors from 1933 to 1961. Made of red bricks or mineral panels with thick (60–70 cm) walls for insulation, they featured high ceilings (up to 4.3 m), wide window sills, and well-planned layouts. Most apartments had 3–5 rooms (57–210 m²), while smaller one-room units (32–50 m²) were rare and placed near entrances. Over time, Stalinist housing became a symbol of status and quality, with many still standing in post-Soviet cities today.

== Layouts ==
As a rule, a Stalinist flat has a significant number of rooms - usually three or four, less often two or more than four. One-room Stalinist apartments were built to a limited extent. The rooms can be either separate or adjacent (in three-room Stalinkas, two rooms are usually combined).

The total area of Stalinkas is usually:

- 1-room - 32-50 m²;
- 2-room - 44–70 m²;
- 3-room - 57–85 m²;
- 4-room - 80–110 m².

Late Stalinkas, erected in the 1950s before the mass construction of Khrushchevkas, were designed according to the SNiP of 1954. According to SNiP, all residential buildings were subdivided into 3 classes - I (the highest), II, III - depending on their durability, fire resistance, provision of public amenities and finishing of premises.

Number of rooms in the apartment	Living area apartments, m^{2}	Minimum area, m^{2}		
Number of rooms in the apartment	Living area apartments, m^{2}	kitchen	common (living) room	bedroom
1	18-22	7	-	-
2	25-32	7	16	9
3	36-50	7	16	9
4	56-65	8	18	9
5	80-95	10	24	9
6	100-120	12	30	9
7	130-160	15	30	9

== Classification of houses ==
Stalinist buildings and apartments are generally divided into two types:

- Nomenklatura (elite) buildings
- Standard (mass-built) Stalinist houses

=== Nomenklatura (elite) housing ===
==== Luxury Stalinist buildings ====
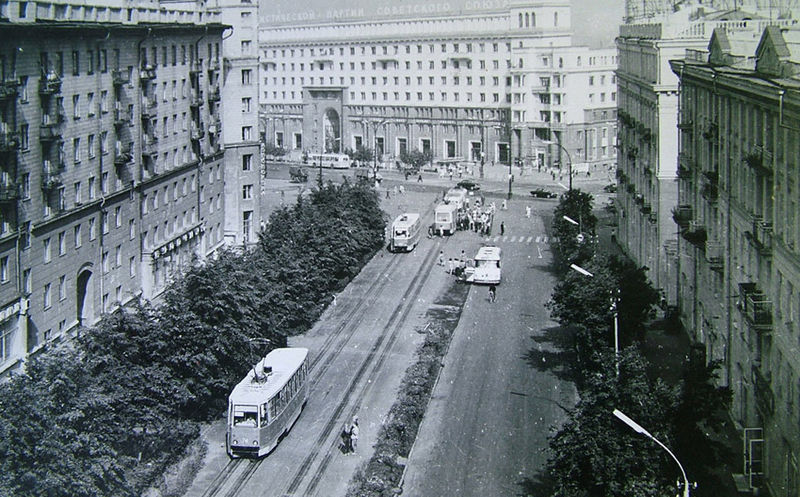
Elite Stalinist houses in the center of Chelyabinsk, photo from the mid-1970s

These high-end Stalinist buildings, also called "departmental housing" (vedomki), were built for the upper echelons of Soviet society—party officials, government and economic leaders, senior military officers, law enforcement personnel, and prominent scientists and artists.

These buildings featured spacious floor plans, often with only two to four large apartments per floor, hallways, large kitchens, separate bathrooms, and rooms ranging from 15–30 m². Some even included workshops for sculptors and artists (e.g., Upper Maslovka, 1 and 3). Apartments were large enough to allow for home offices, libraries, and children's rooms. Ground-floor units were sometimes allocated for communal living, including housing for security staff, janitors, etc.

The facades were richly decorated with stone cladding (granite, marble) or high-quality ceramic tiles and often featured stucco, bas-reliefs, and even statues.

==== Director's housing ====
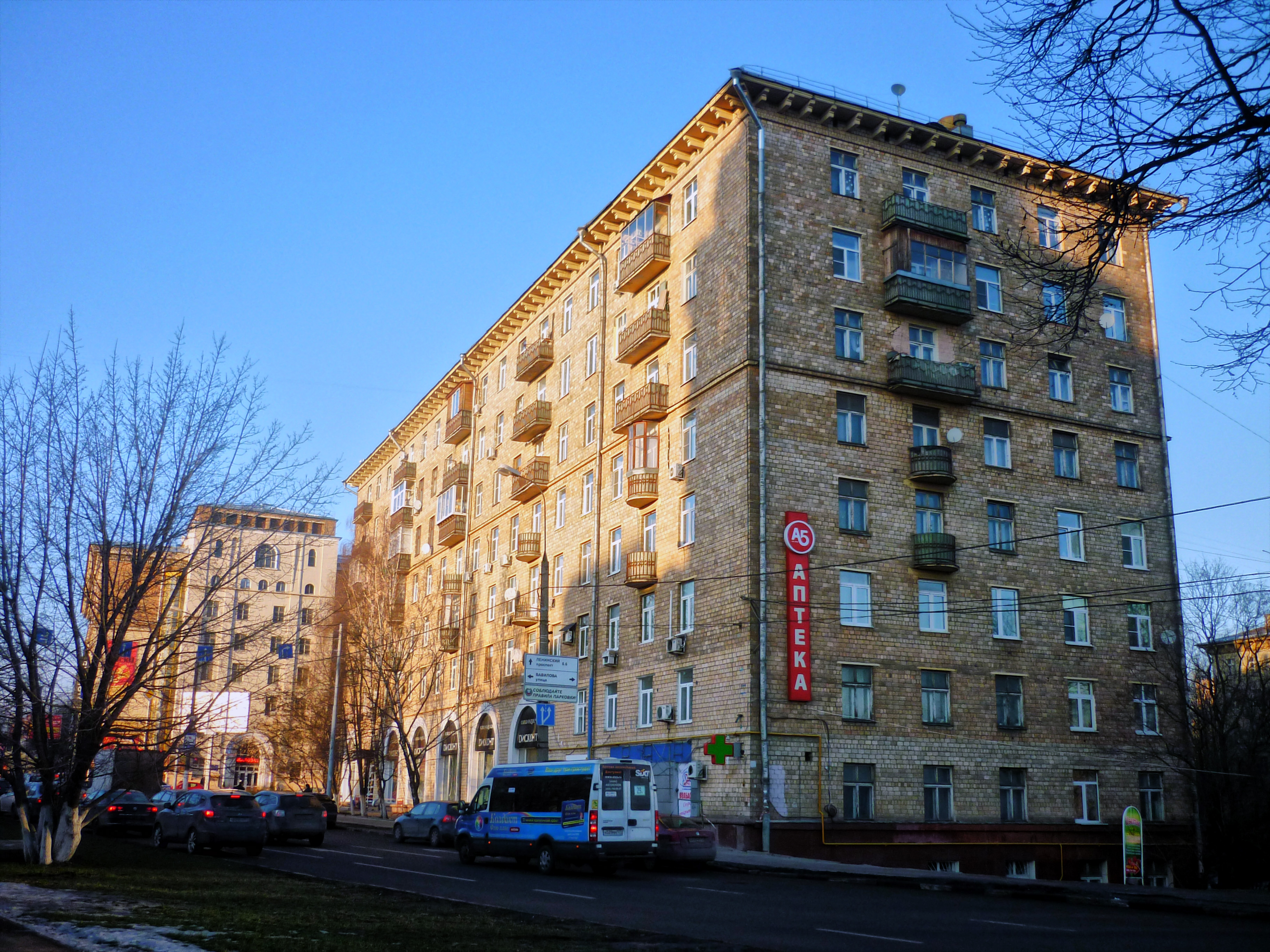
Moscow, Vavilova St. , 55/7 — an example of the director's housing of the Russian Academy of Sciences from the mid-1950s

A subset of elite housing ("директорские"), director's buildings were built for top industrial and scientific managers. These buildings had classical architectural elements but minimal decoration. They were large, often with high first floors, and finished with stucco and molded ornaments. Most had reinforced concrete or mixed-material floors, and buildings over five stories included elevators (required under the Soviet building code) and, in some cases, individual garbage chutes in kitchens. Ceiling heights ranged from 2.9 to 3.2 meters or more.

These buildings were typically located in city centers, along major avenues, and near squares, often designed as architectural landmarks. After Stalinist construction ended, Vulykh towers and later Tsekovsky buildings replaced them.

=== Ordinary Stalinist buildings ===
Mass-built Stalinkas were more modest than their elite counterparts. The idea that they were built only for workers is a misconception—many skilled workers and labor leaders received apartments in better-designed Stalinist buildings.

Garbage chutes and elevators were installed only in buildings of six stories or more, a requirement under Soviet building code, a rule that continued into the Khrushchyovka era.

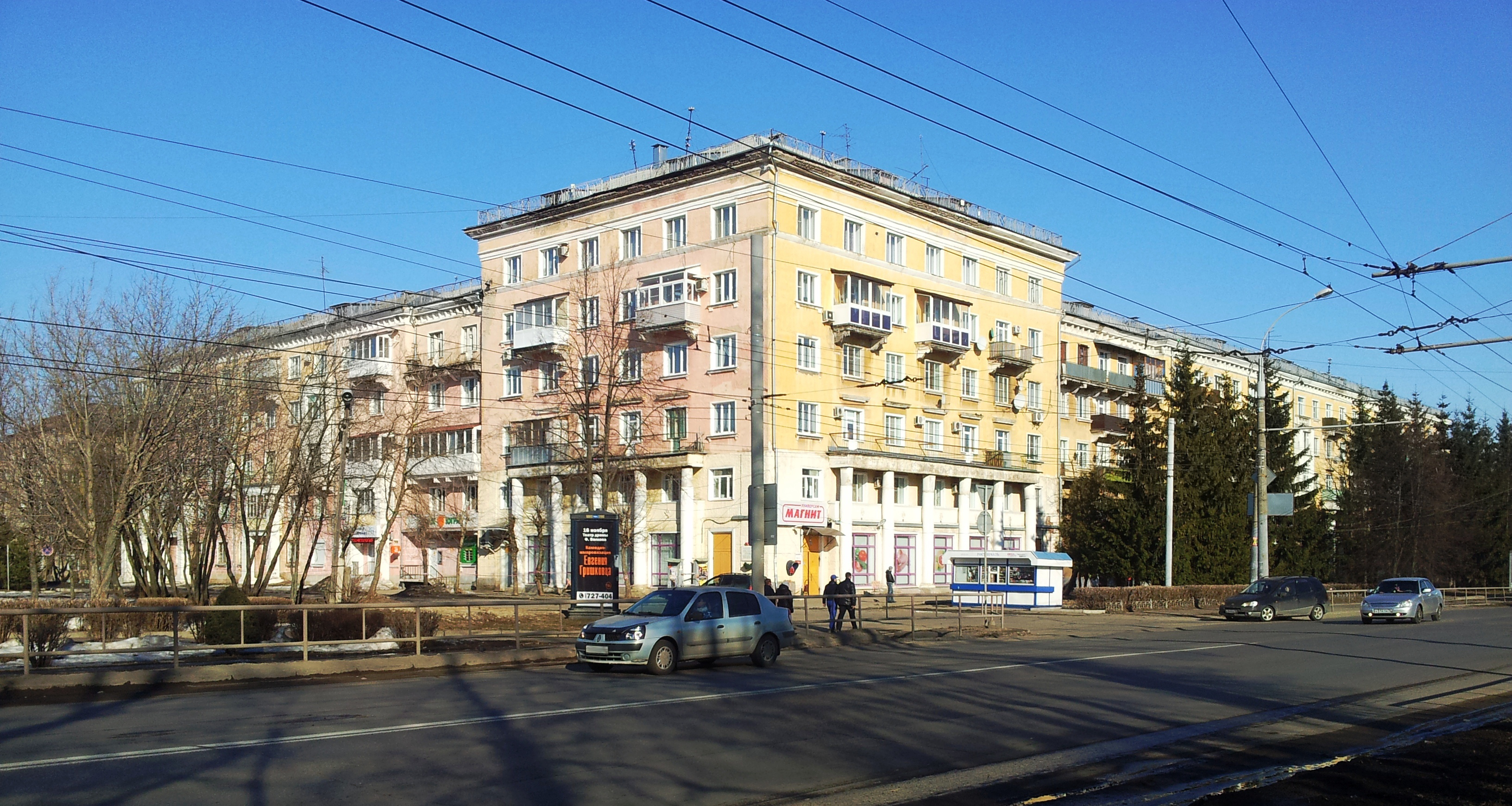
6-story Stalinist building at 146 Lenin Avenue, Rybinsk

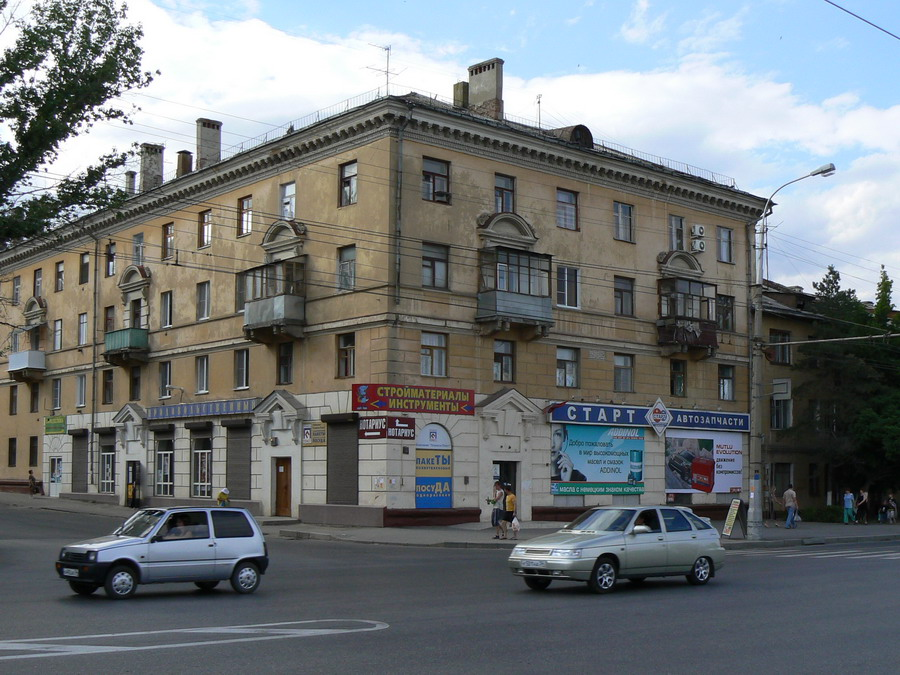
Stalinist building in Volgograd — a "standard" type

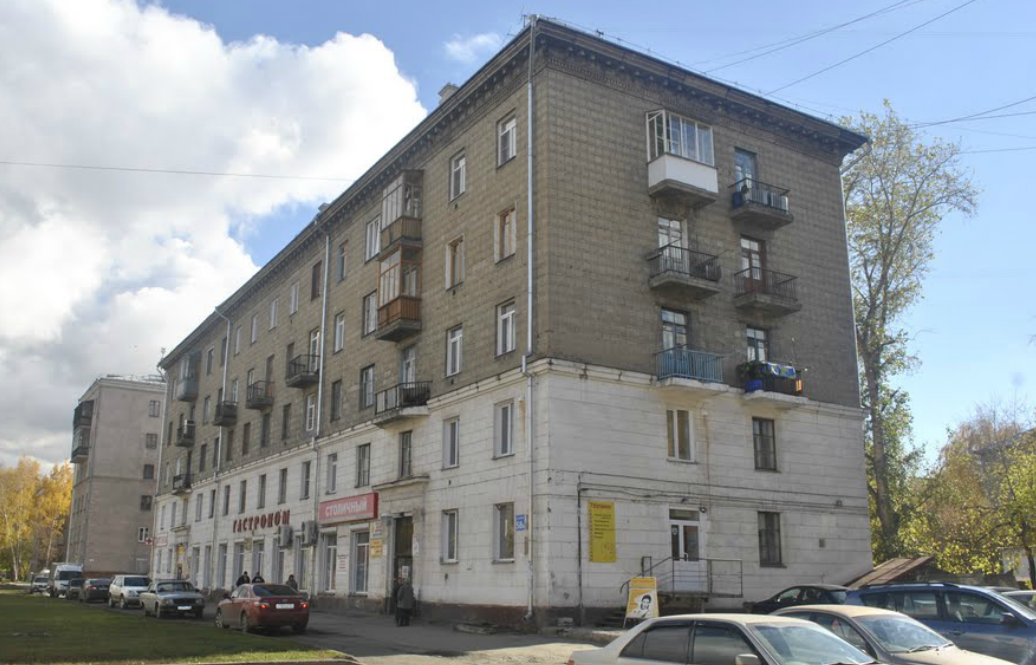
Stalinist building in Novosibirsk, built in 1958. A classic Stalinist-style building constructed after 1956 for the management of the Rare Metals Plant in Novosibirsk, without its originally planned decorative elements.

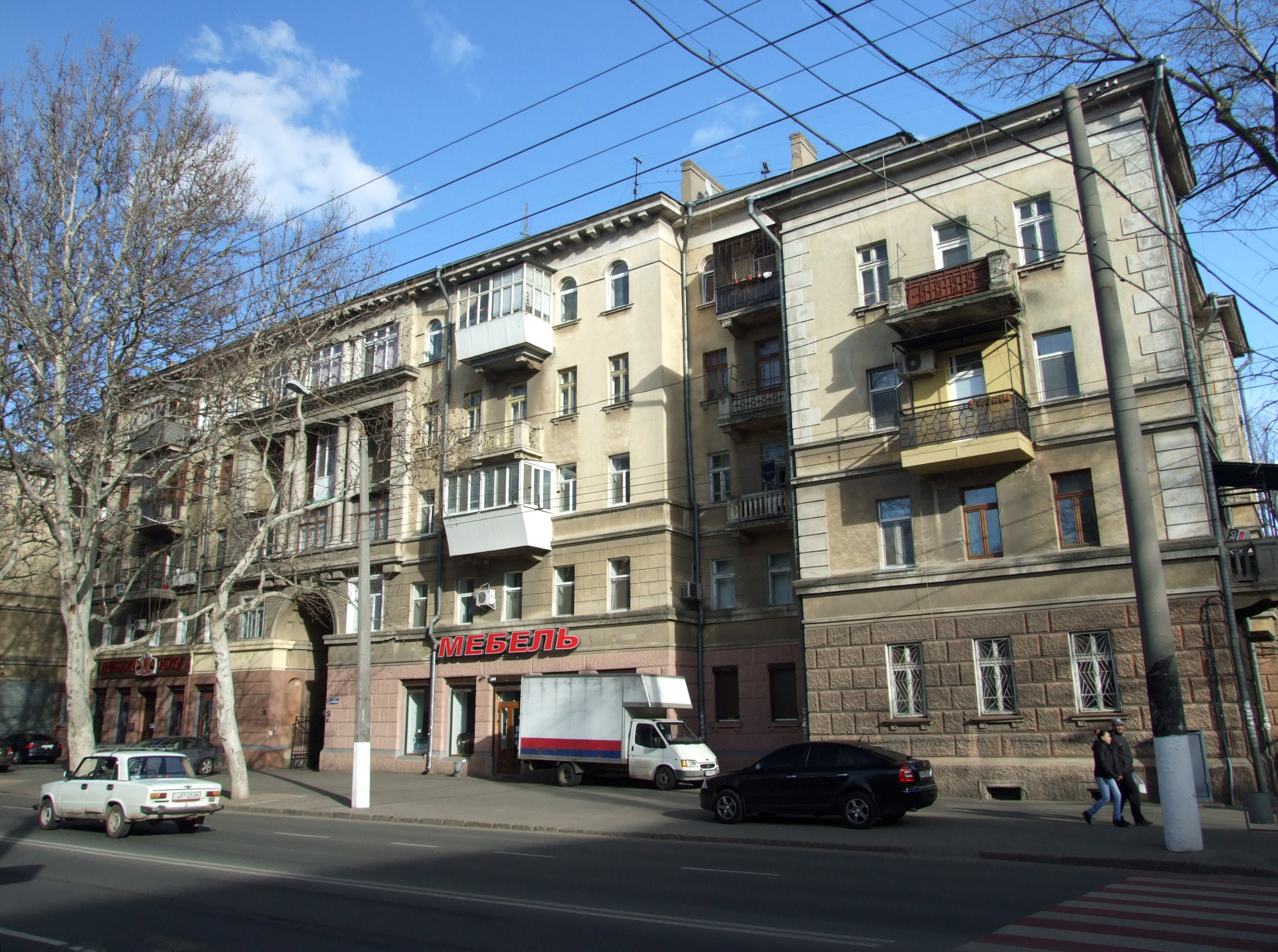
Stalinist building in Odesa, Bohdan Khmelnytsky Street

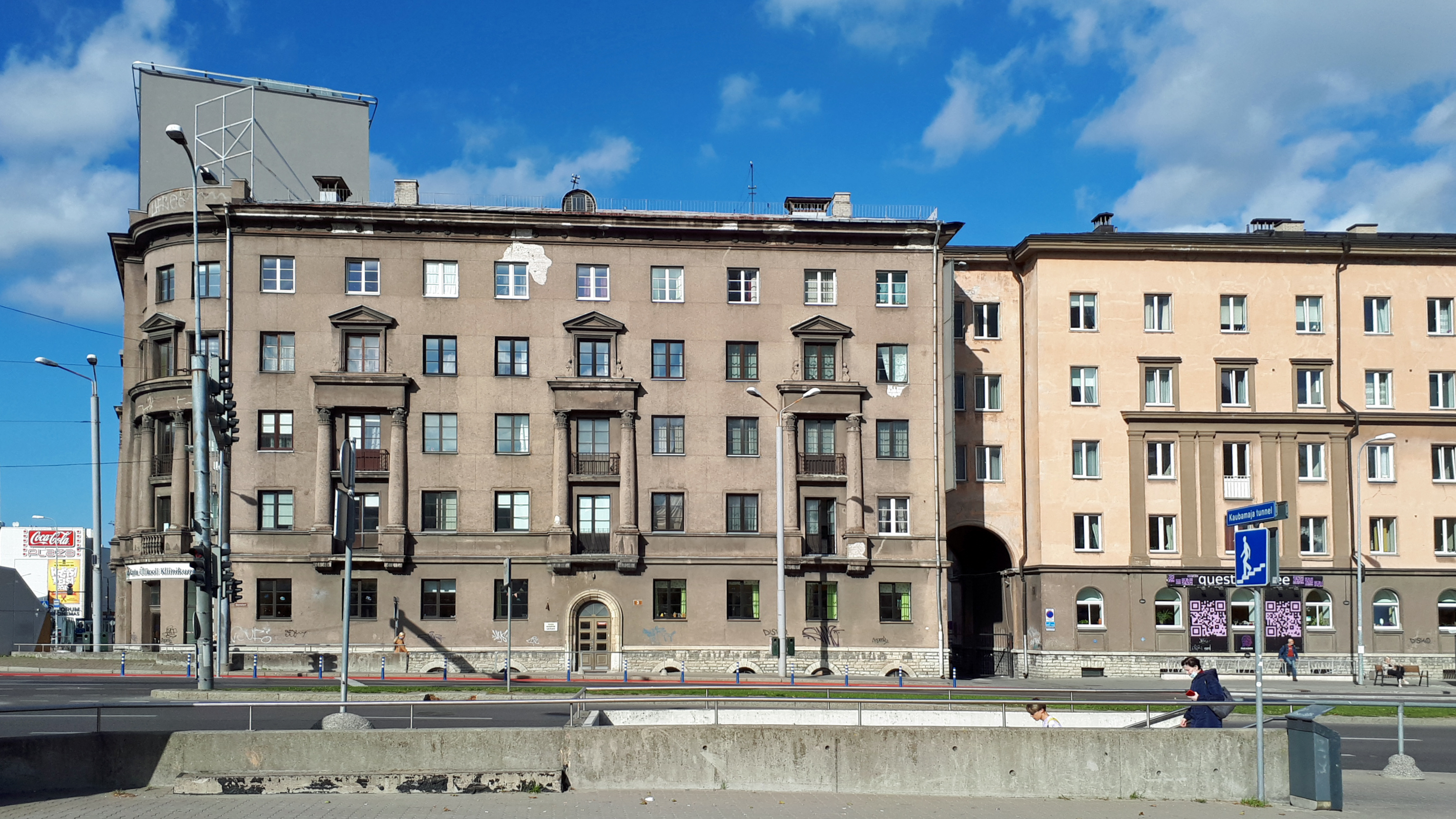
Tallinn Stalinist building on Gonsiori Street (1951)

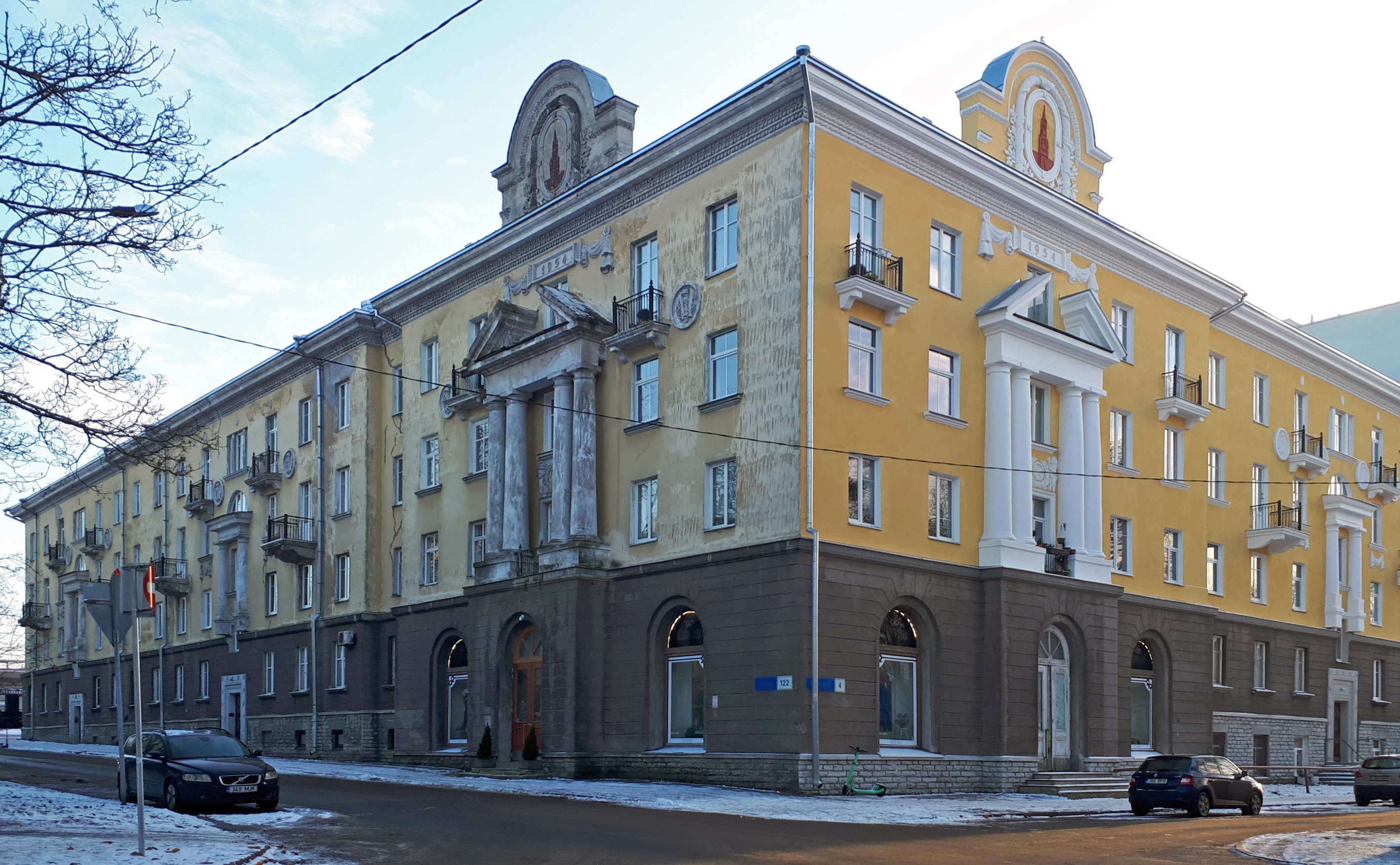
Tallinn Stalinist building on Koidu Street (Tallinn) (1954)

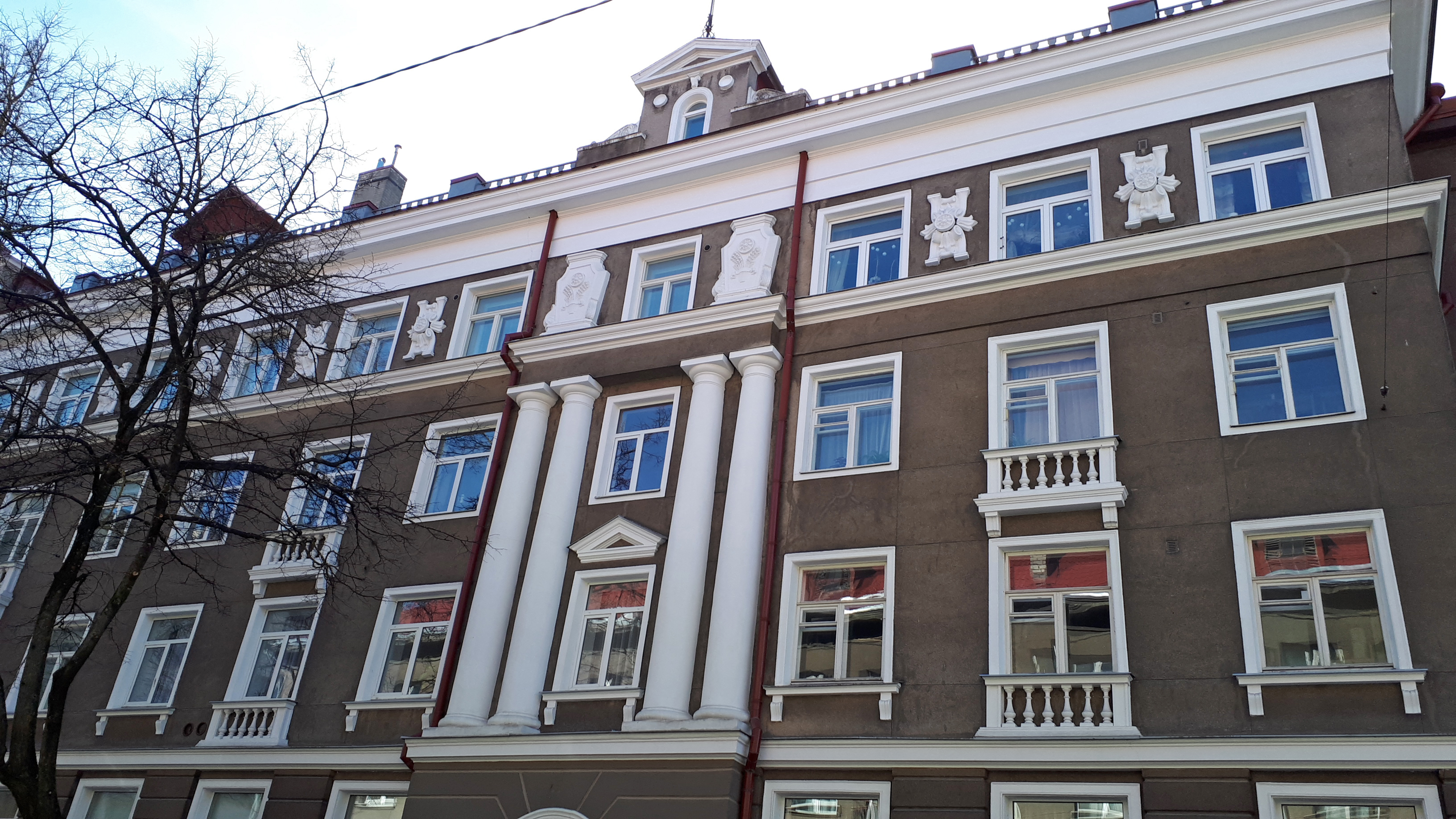
Tallinn Stalinist building on Kentmanni Street (1956)

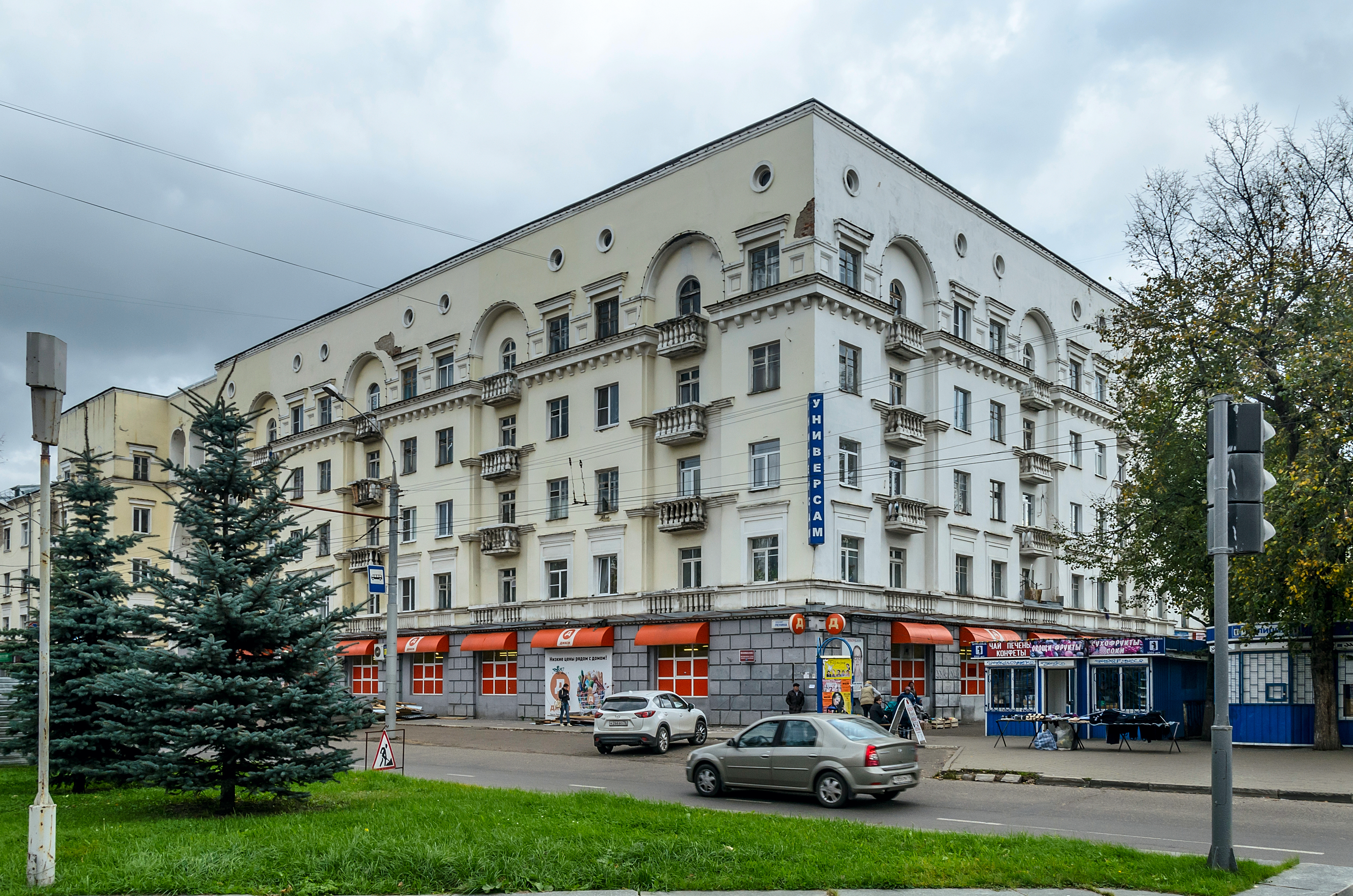
Stalinist building in Yaroslavl, Lenin Avenue

Low-rise Stalinist buildings

Low-rise Stalinist buildings were built in the post-war period up until 1960. These houses were constructed according to pre-designed standard series, which included several house variants: single-, double-, or triple-entrance buildings, corner designs, those with shops on the ground floor, as well as dormitories.

Low-rise construction was utilized because it offered several advantages: it did not require scarce construction equipment, could be carried out by low-skilled workers—including German prisoners of war and convicts—and the construction of a house did not take much time. This explains the nickname "German houses," although not all of these buildings were constructed by Germans. In Saint Petersburg, the term "German cottages" is common due to their low height (2–3 stories) compared to the city's predominant architecture. In the 1990s and 2000s, all the apartments in some of these houses were bought up, after which they were converted into "true" cottages (individual residential homes).

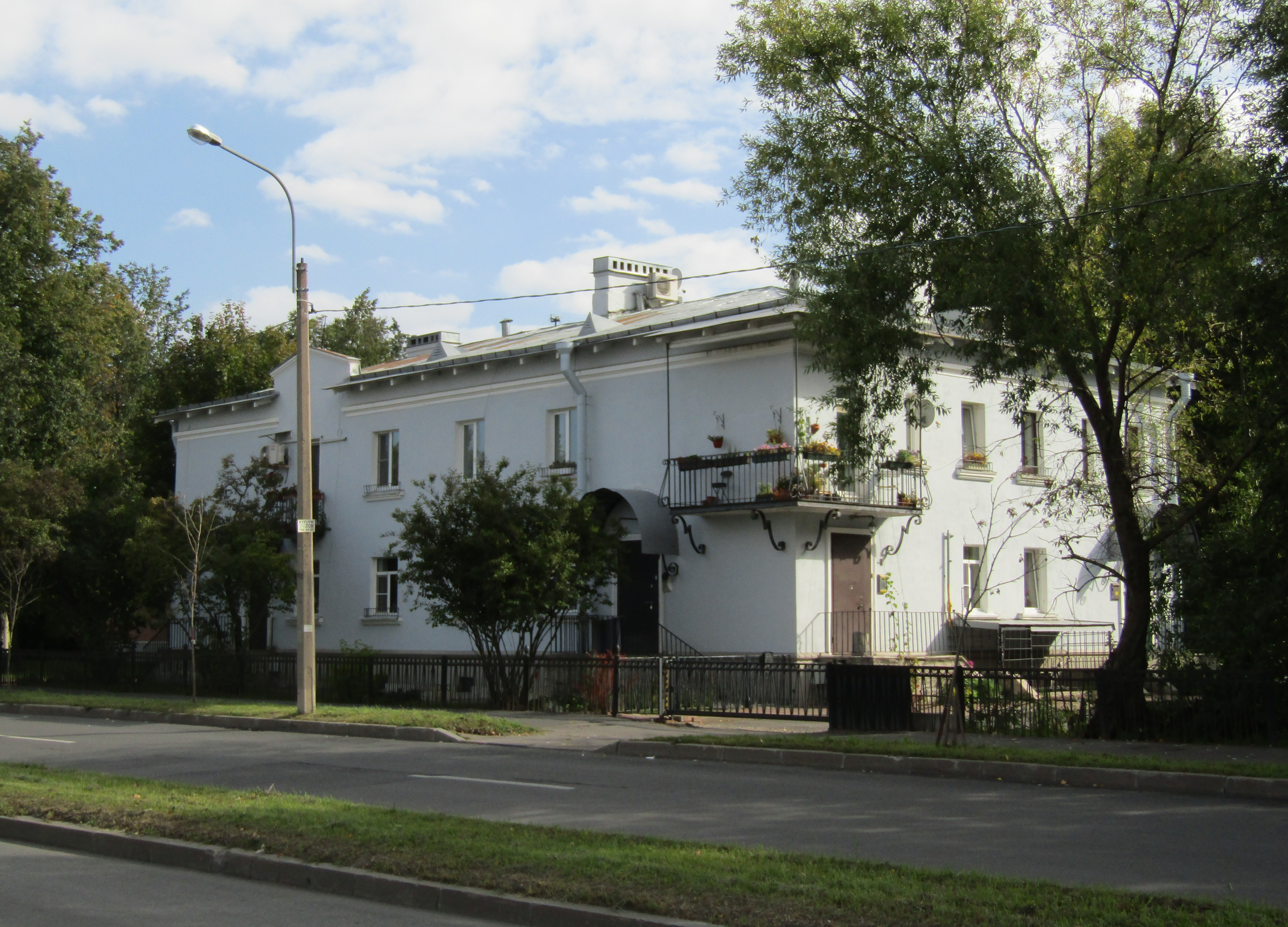
Shkolnaya Street, House 24 in Saint Petersburg

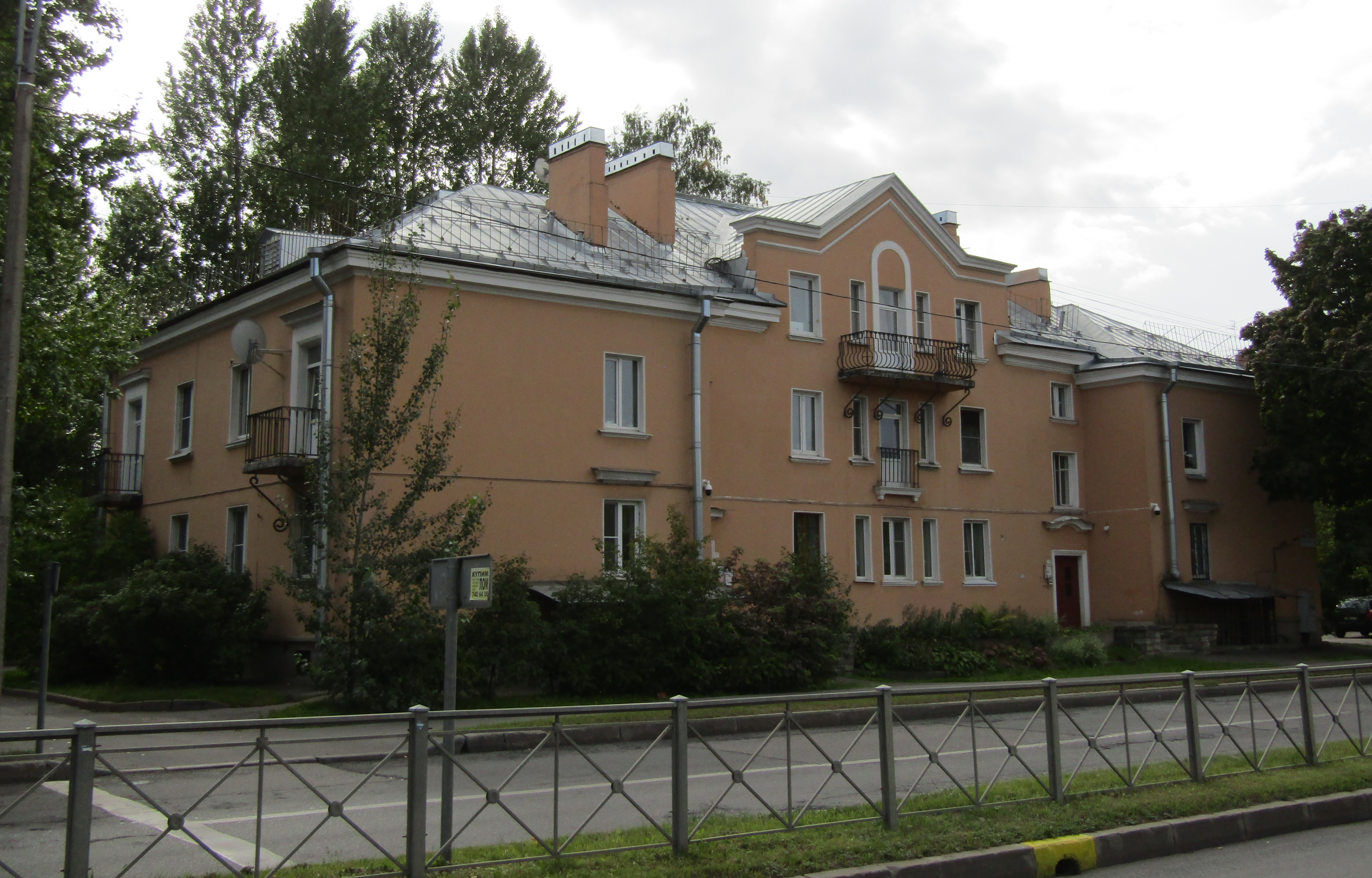
Shkolnaya Street, House 46 in Saint Petersburg

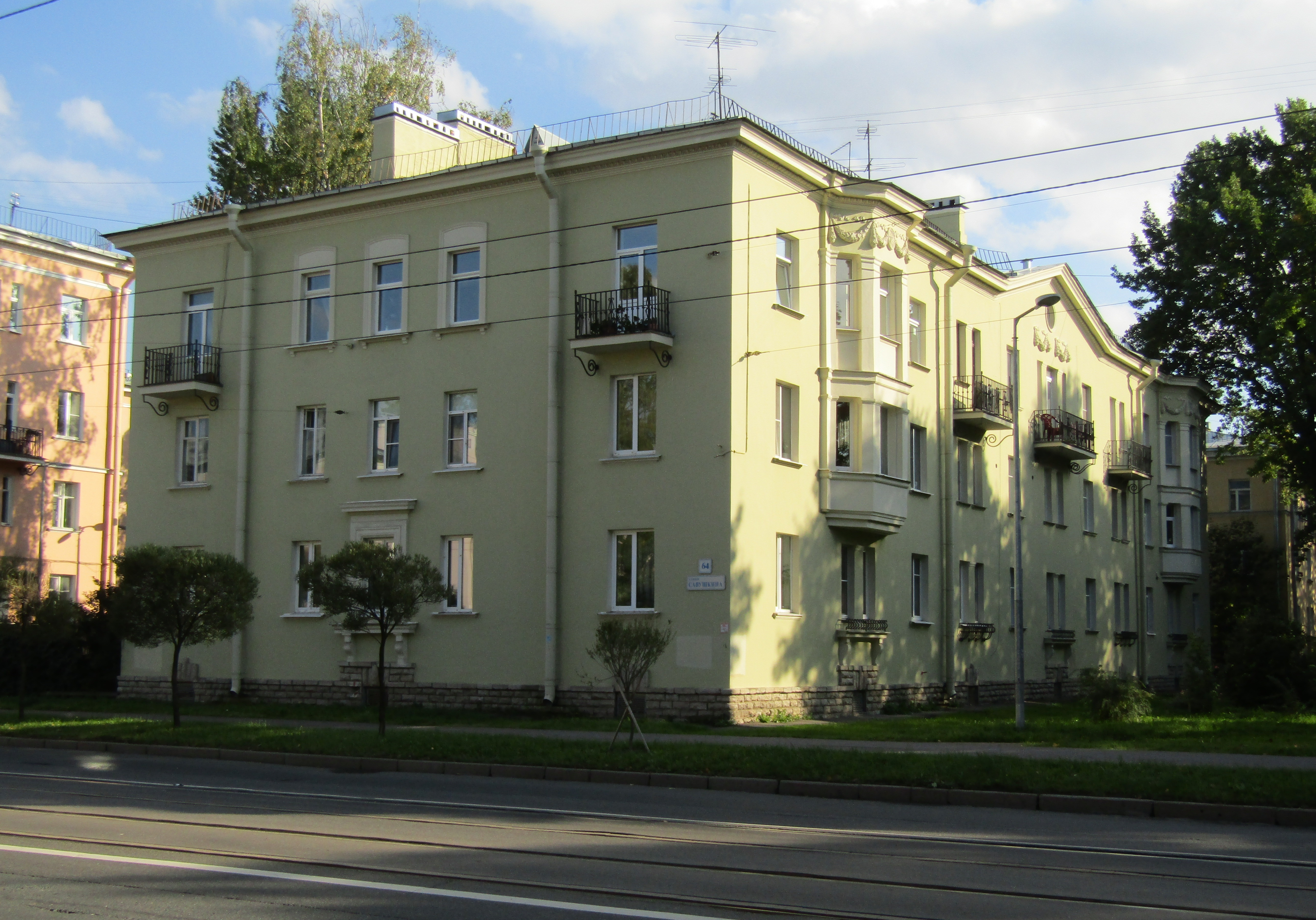
Savushkina Street, House 64 in Saint Petersburg

=== Standardised Stalinist buildings ===
At the end of the 1940s, to accelerate the provision of housing for the population, the construction of Stalinist buildings based on standard designs began. Compared to the elite "nomenklatura" houses, which were built according to individual projects, standard Stalinist buildings have more modest characteristics and simplified architecture. Standard Stalinist buildings are quite numerous due to the increased volume of housing construction during this period.

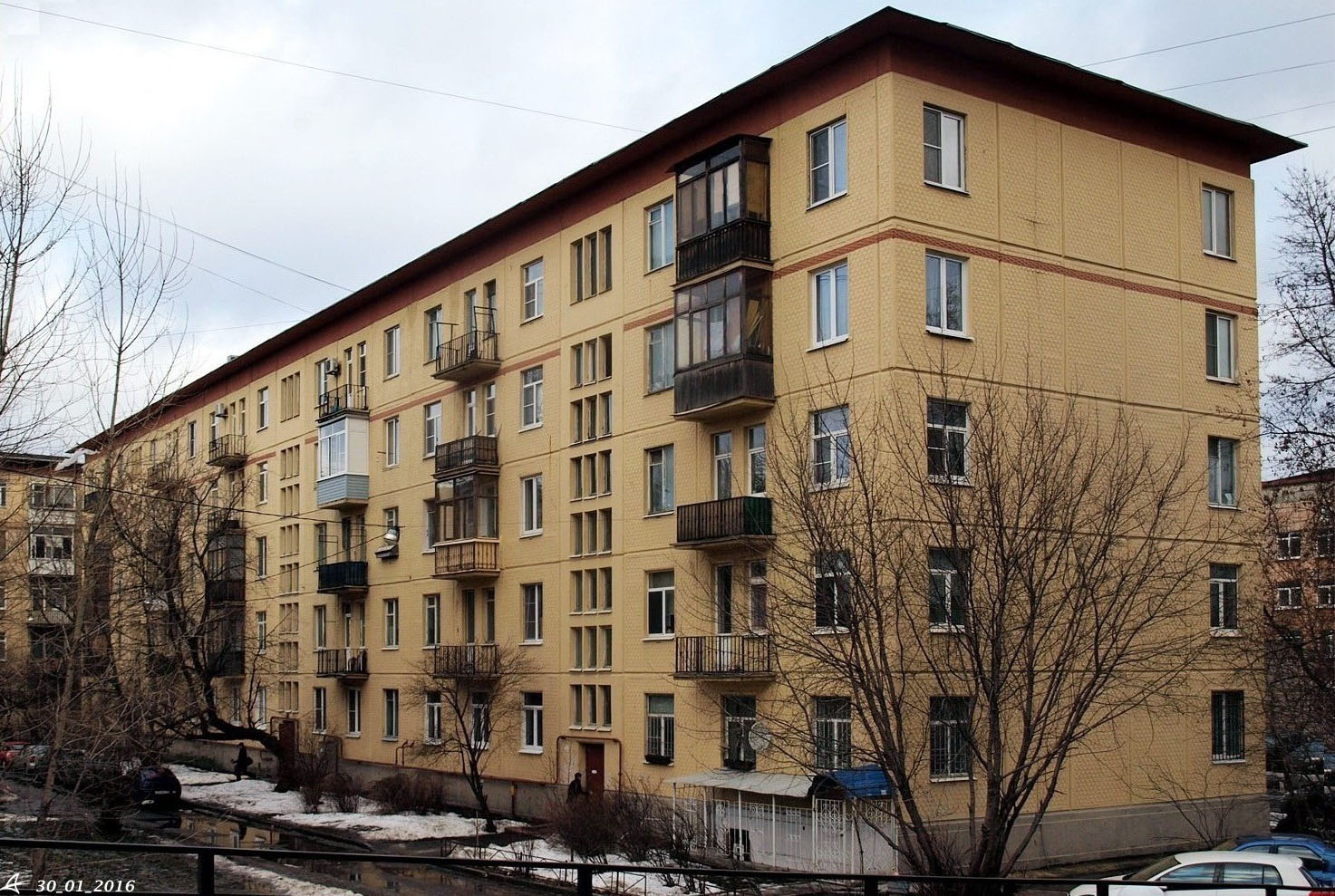
1-506 large panel building in St. Petersburg

In Moscow, standard Stalinist buildings of the series II-01, II-03 (I-410 (САКБ)), II-14, MG-1, and higher-comfort houses II-02, II-04 were constructed. In Leningrad, houses of the series 1-405, 1-415, 1-460, and others were built.

In the mid-1950s, the introduction of large-panel construction technology began. Notable "panel Stalinist buildings" include the Leningrad series 1-506.

== Construction ==
=== Building ===
The primary construction material used in Stalinist buildings is brick. Pre-war constructions predominantly used red ceramic brick, while later ones utilized white calcium silicate brick. Exterior walls typically have a thickness of 2.5 bricks (65 cm), while interior load-bearing walls range from 1 to 1.5 bricks (25–38 cm). In Stalinist buildings with wooden floors, the spacing of internal load-bearing walls was less than 6 meters, due to wood's lower load-bearing capacity compared to reinforced concrete.

In addition to the traditional wall structure typical of residential buildings, Stalinist buildings employed a mixed design with a partial frame. In this case, the load-bearing exterior walls and stairwell walls were made of brick. Interior and inter-apartment load-bearing walls were absent—instead, columns of brick, and occasionally reinforced concrete, were used. Horizontal beams of steel or reinforced concrete rested on these columns and the exterior load-bearing walls, supporting the floors.

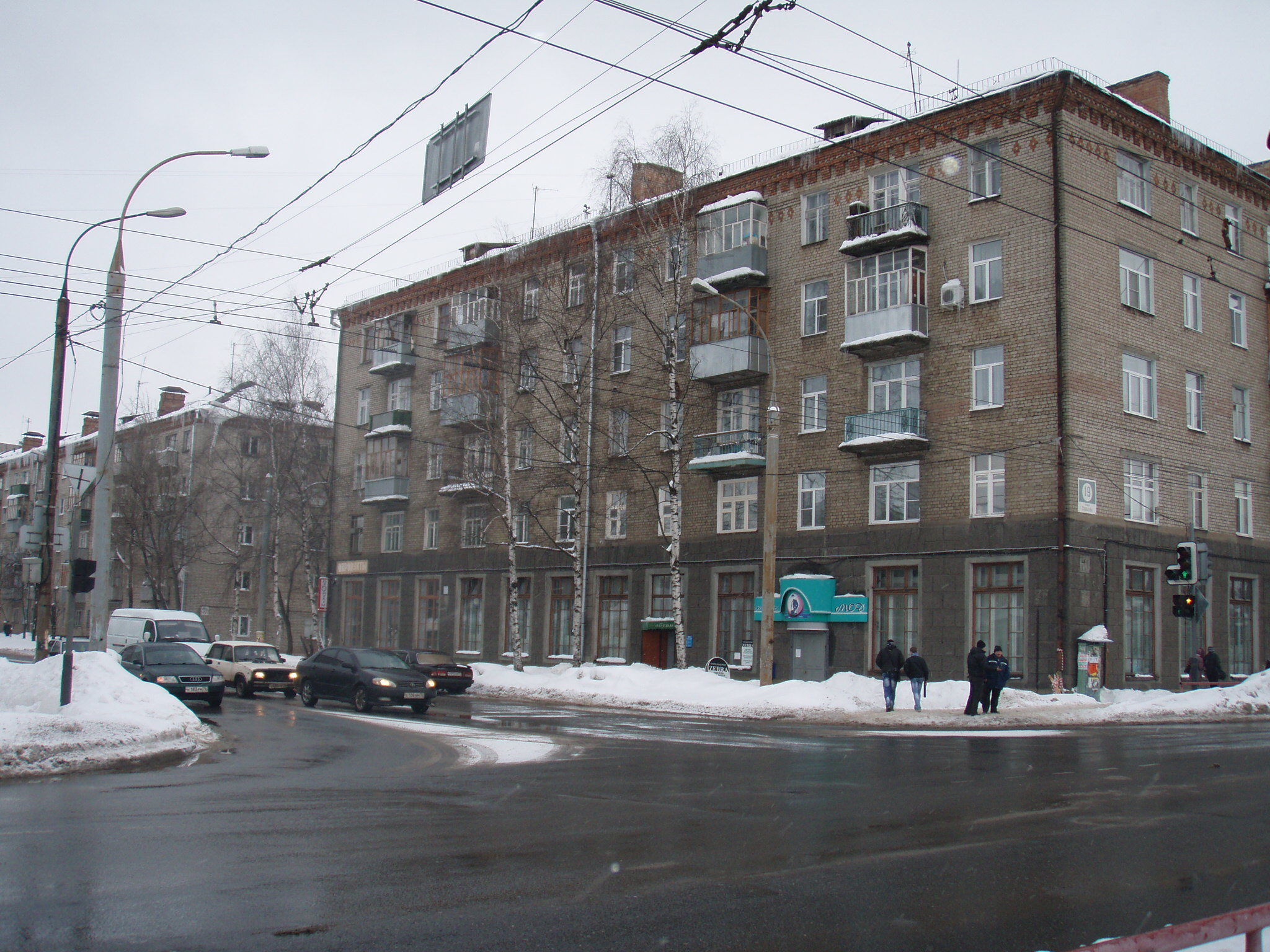
A "stripped" Stalinist house built in 1957 (on the right) and a brick Khrushchev-era building of the 1-447 series (on the left) in the center of Rybinsk, Russia

Brick houses are generally characterized by higher floors, refined facades, spacious apartments, and better sound insulation.

In low-rise construction, cinder blocks were used—cinder block houses foreshadowed the upcoming mass construction based on industrial blocks and panels. In brick construction, a lightweight well masonry technique was employed, with the wells filled with slag. In the late 1940s and early 1950s, the first large-panel houses were built using a frame-panel system, and later a frameless scheme.

Stalinist skyscrapers were constructed using a steel frame, followed by partial concreting of the steel structures.

== See also ==
- Khrushchevka
- Stalinist architecture
- Kotelnicheskaya Embankment Building
