= Vitaly Lagutenko =

Soviet architect and engineer

Vitaly Pavlovich Lagutenko
- Born: 1904; Mogilev, Russian Empire
- Died: December 26, 1968 (aged 63–64); Moscow, Soviet Union
- Education: Moscow Institute of Transport
- Family: Ilya Lagutenko
- Engineering career
- Discipline: Civil Engineering
- Projects: Khrushchyovka

Vitaly Pavlovich Lagutenko (Russian: Виталий Павлович Лагутенко, 1904, Mogilev – 26 December 1968, Moscow) was a Soviet architect and engineer. His studies of low-cost prefabricated concrete construction, supported by Nikita Khrushchev, led to a complete switch of Soviet building practice from masonry to prefab concrete. Lagutenko designed the standardized 5-story apartment houses, known as khrushchevka, and associated technologies of fast, mass-scale construction. These low-cost blocks, built by millions of units, helped relieve post-war housing shortage.

== Biography ==
Lagutenko came to Moscow in 1921 at the age of 17 and found a job at the construction site of Kazansky Rail Terminal where he met Alexey Shchusev. In 1931, Lagutenko graduated from Moscow Institute of Transportation Engineers and joined Shchusev's architectural workshop. During World War II, Lagutenko worked on city camouflage and repairs of war losses.

In 1947, in the heyday of extravagant, high-cost, low-density Stalinist architecture, the City of Moscow appointed Lagutenko to lead the experimental Industrial Construction Bureau, with an objective to study and design the low-cost technology suitable for fast mass construction; in 1949, he is promoted to lead Workshop No.1. He was not alone; parallel projects were tackled by traditional architects (Ivan Zholtovsky) and technologists (Rosenfeld and Pomazanov's blocks on Peschanaya Street). Lagutenko differentiated from them by focusing on low-cost prefab concrete and completely disposing with Stalinist grandeur.

His first project (1947–1950, architectural design by Mikhail Posokhin), an 8-story block south from Rosenfeld's, used a frame structure made with prefab concrete beams and mixed concrete-masonry filling of external walls. Apartments are small, but not as small as his later designs; externally, the houses at least pretend to be Stalinist, using cornice and bas relief details, also of prefab concrete.

The end of Stalinist architecture was spelled in January 1950, when an architects’ convention, supervised by Khrushchev (then the party boss of Moscow City), declared low-cost, high-speed technologies the objective of Soviet architects. In 1953 and 1954, Lagutenko supervised launch of two first prefab concrete plants in western Moscow. By the time Khrushchev finally disposed with Stalin's architectural legacy (November 1955 decree on "stripping redundancies"), plant technology was already in place and could be copied to any big city. However, designs of the 1950s were not optimized for speed and cost (not to mention that they were ugly). This optimization – in engineering and project management – took another 5 years and brought Lagutenko the title of Hero of Socialist Labour (1960).

In 1961, Lagutenko's institute releases the infamous K-7 design of a prefab 5-story that became a symbol of khrushchevka. 3 million square meters (64 thousand units) of this type were built in Moscow in 1961-1968, but it was just a beginning. Cost cuts were everywhere, from diminutive floorplans to partitions only 4 centimeter thick. Ceiling height is usually stated as 2.48 meters, but can be as low as 2.40. Yet the structure could be topped-out in 12 days – following Lagutenko's carefully metered project schedule, panels were assembled without mortar. K-7 quality was plagued from the start. Subsequent revisions and daughter designs finally fixed it, but were just as cramped and ugly.

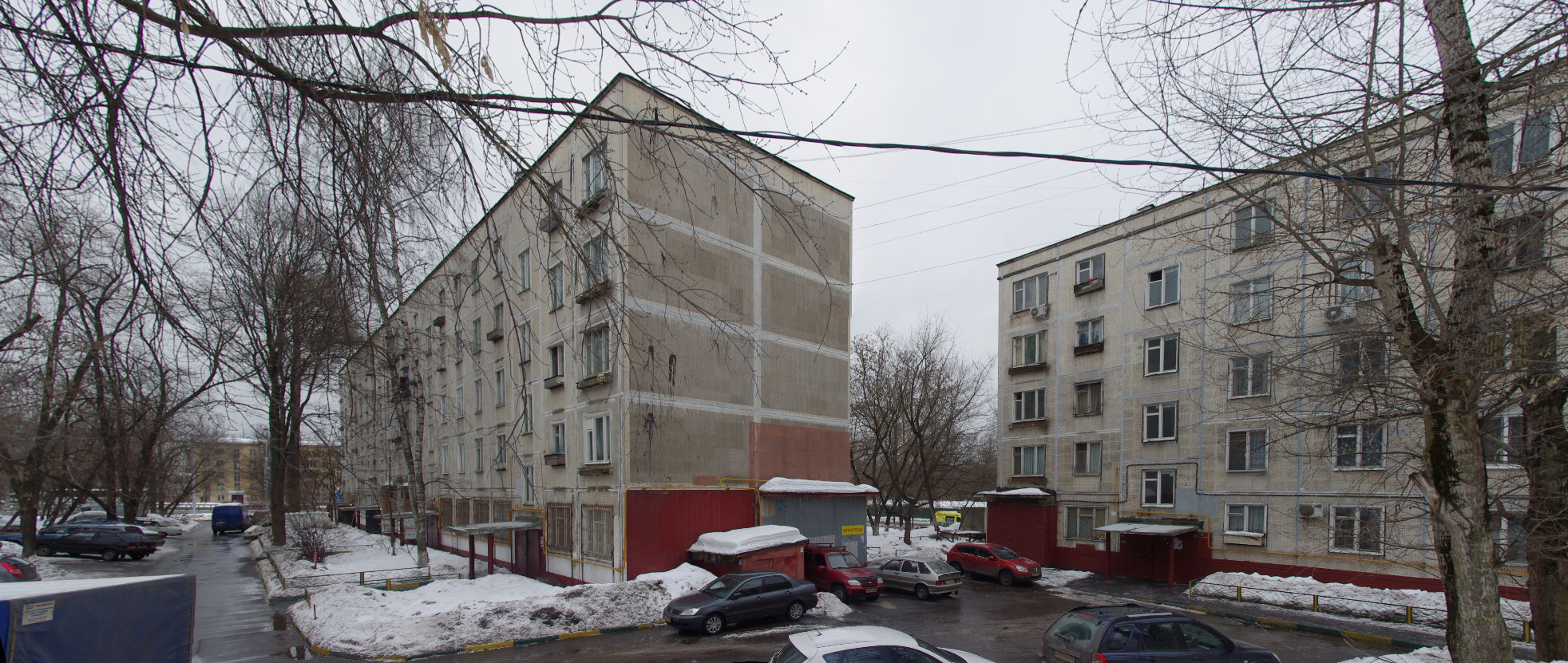
K-7 buildings in Moscow before demolish in 2010s

They were not intended to last; the so-called disposable series (сносимые серии) had a planned 25-year lifetime. In Moscow, they are being demolished since 1994 and the city intends to complete demolition by 2009; they still stand in less wealthy towns.

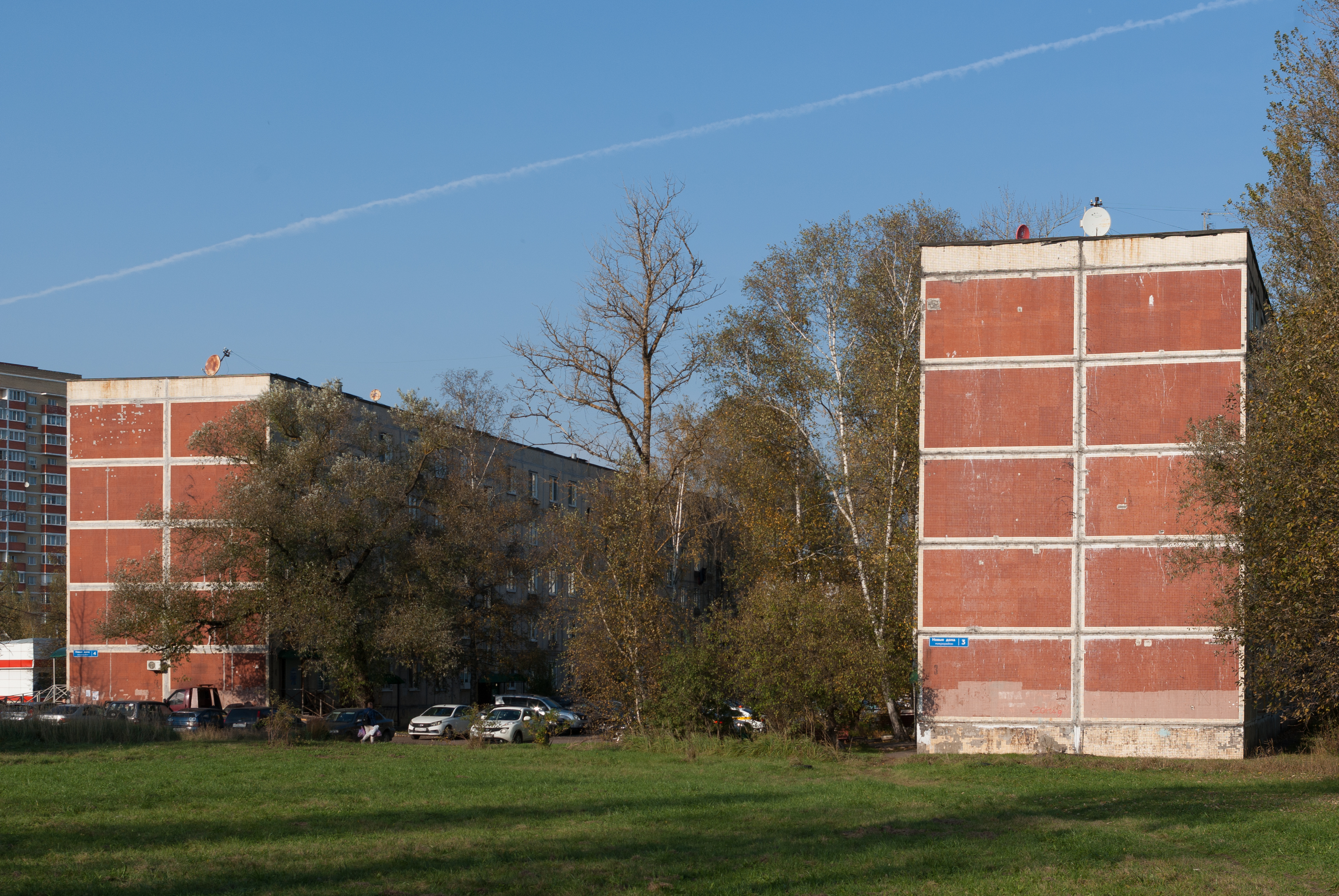
Tower block of K-7 buildings in original look, Moscow Oblast (2025)

Lagutenko worked on the same prefab concrete theme until his death in 1968.

In modern Russian language, lagutyonky is sometimes applied indiscriminately to all early khrushchevka (not necessarily of Lagutenko's lineage).

Pop singer Ilya Lagutenko is his grandson.
