= Series P-44 =

- П-44
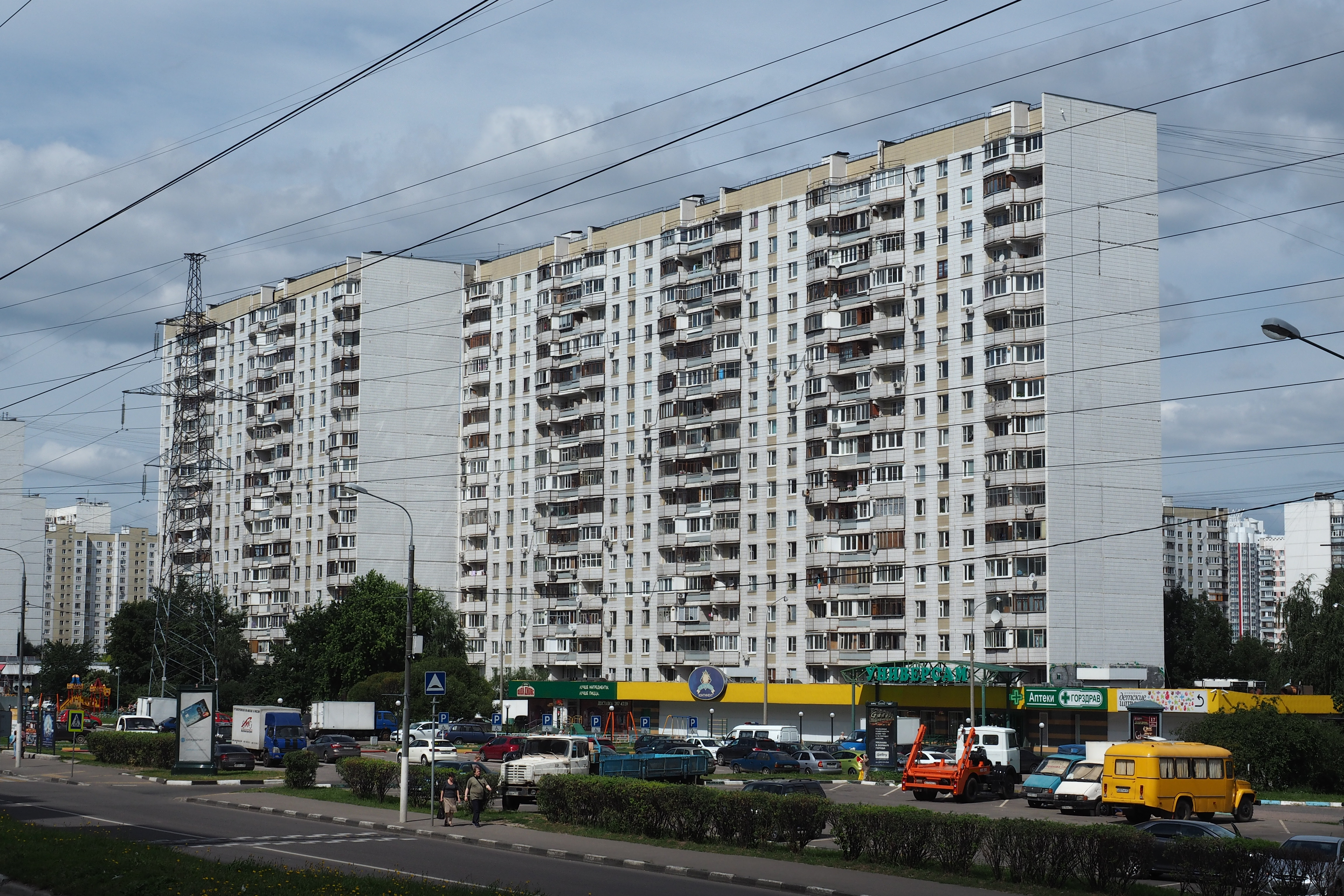

General information
- Type: Residential
- Architectural style: Soviet large-panel housing
- Location: Russia (also built in Ukraine)

Height
- Height: c. 47 m
- Top floor: 17 (P-44 and P-44K), 25 (P-44T high-rise variant)

Technical details
- Structural system: Prefabricated reinforced-concrete panels
- Floor count: 16-17 (P-44), up to 25 (P-44T)

Design and construction
- Architect: MNIITEP
- Main contractor: DSK-1, Moscow's First House-Building Combine

Series P-44 (Russian: П-44) is a family of Soviet and Russian prefabricated large-panel residential buildings. The original design was drawn up in the late 1970s by MNIITEP, Moscow's Research and Design Institute of Typology and Experimental Design, and was put into mass production at the city's First House-Building Combine (DSK-1) from 1979 to 2002. With its successors (P-44T, P-44K and several smaller offshoots), the series is the single most widespread residential typology in Moscow and one of the defining building types of late-Soviet mass housing.

The first two Series P-44 buildings went up in 1979 at 22 and 24 Khoroshyovskoye Highway in Moscow. The design replaced the late-Brezhnev-era series in new districts and offered larger kitchens, a combined freight-and-passenger lift, and a concierge desk in the ground-floor lobby. The dominant configuration was a 16- or 17-storey block of two or four sections, often joined into L-shaped or stepped plans by a rotated corner section. About 1,500 buildings of the base P-44 type were completed in total, around 1,200 of them in Moscow.

The series and its variants became visual shorthand for late- and post-Soviet Moscow. Academic writing has placed the P-44 within the "path-dependent" development of Moscow's residential stock, in which the same factory-based panel system kept producing successive generations of the same product into the 21st century. Most P-44 buildings have so far been left out of the demolition wave directed at older Khrushchyovkas under the 2017 Moscow Renovation Programme.

== History ==
By the late 1970s Soviet residential construction in Moscow was dominated by a small number of long-running panel series. Most were descended from the Khrushchyovka era and from the early-Brezhnev-period 1605 series. MNIITEP was tasked with a clean-sheet design rather than another evolution of the older types. Project P-44 was finalised by 1977, and the first two buildings were handed over by DSK-1 in 1979 at 22 and 24 Khoroshyovskoye Highway in Moscow.

Compared with the panel series it replaced, P-44 offered larger kitchens, a combined freight-and-passenger lift, and a designated concierge space inside the lobby. From the early 1980s it was used in almost every new mass-housing district being laid out in Moscow, including Otradnoye, Strogino, Krylatskoye, Mitino, Marino, Severnoye Butovo, Yuzhnoye Butovo, Vykhino-Zhulebino and Novokosino. Smaller production runs took place in Yaroslavl, Tynda and Nizhnevartovsk, with one-off examples in Aleksandrov, Ivanovo, Petrozavodsk, Oryol, Rostov-on-Don, Ufa, Nefteyugansk and Kryvyi Rih in Soviet Ukraine.

Through the production run the appearance of the buildings changed in increments. The first blocks came out in white-and-blue cladding. White-and-brown took over from 1983 and white-and-beige from 1988. The factory moved to plastic window frames in 1997. Lift indicators, button mechanisms and cabin light fittings each went through several generations between 1980 and the late 1990s.

The last classic P-44 building was handed over in 2002 in Yaroslavl, on Stroiteley Street. By then DSK-1 had moved its main production to the updated P-44T platform.

== Architecture ==
A typical Series P-44 block has 16 or 17 storeys and tops out at around 47 metres. There are four apartments per floor. DSK-1 cast the reinforced-concrete panels at its own plant. Internal panels take the load. The external panels carry the insulation and the tiled finish. Floor plans run from one bedroom up to four. The kitchen is roughly 8 m², large by the standards of the Brezhnevka series it replaced. Ceiling height is 2.64 metres in the base P-44 and 2.70 metres in the P-44T and P-44K updates.

Two- and four-section blocks dominate. They are occasionally joined into L-shapes or stepped plans by a rotated corner section (designated P-44-4). The resulting building footprints helped break up the long unbroken rows of the older 1605 series and gave the late-1980s Moscow microdistricts a more varied skyline than their early-1970s predecessors.

== Variants ==
In the mid-1990s MNIITEP and DSK-1 redrew the P-44 toolkit as Series P-44T. The kitchen ventilation duct shifted to the corridor, which freed up extra floor space in the kitchen. Fire-safety standards were tightened. The bland tiled façades gave way to red, orange and yellow brick-effect cladding, and most variants gained bay windows. Production of P-44T ran from 1997 to 2019, with about 800 buildings completed, around 600 of them in Moscow.

Series P-44K, a 17-storey variant, followed from 2005. Series P-44M was a smaller offshoot of P-44T with revised corner sections. P-44TM was a 25-storey high-rise version of P-44T.

Main variants of Series P-44
Variant	Production years	Maximum floors	Ceiling height	Apartments per floor
P-44	1979-2002	17	2.64 m	4
P-44T	1997-2019	25	2.70 m	4
P-44K	2005-2019	17	2.70 m	4
P-44M, P-44TM	various	up to 25	2.70 m	4

== Reception ==
The Calvert Journal described rows of Series P-44 blocks as "one of the most recognisable sights" of late- and post-Soviet Moscow. The publication noted that filmmaker Maxim Tomash had built his short documentary Panelka around the soundscape of a single P-44 building, treating the block as a stand-in for the everyday architecture of the city's outer districts.

Daniel Baldwin Hess and Tiit Tammaru, writing in an edited Springer volume on post-socialist mass housing, used Series P-44 as the canonical example of Moscow's "path-dependent" residential stock: a closed system of design institutes and house-building combines that kept reproducing the same panel product from the 1960s into the 2010s. Kateryna Malaia, in the journal Architectural Histories, has similarly described the late-Soviet prefabricated panel as a building block whose dominance was driven less by architectural choice than by the institutional inertia of the state-run construction industry.

ArchDaily has criticised the 2017 Moscow Renovation Programme for treating Soviet mass housing as a uniform problem to be cleared, arguing that the Khrushchyovka, Brezhnevka and P-44 typologies have very different service-life prospects. The political scientist Regina Smyth has separately analysed the Renovation Programme as an instrument of political reward and punishment, with district-level selection patterns correlating to local voting behaviour rather than to the technical condition of the buildings concerned. Most P-44 buildings have so far not been included in the demolition lists, although The Calvert Journal has noted that a full renovation of the stock will eventually be required given the sheer number of blocks involved.

== See also ==
- Panel building
- Khrushchyovka
- Brezhnevka
- Stalinka
- Plattenbau
- Moscow Urban Renewal Initiative
- Architecture of the Soviet Union
