= Brezhnevka =

Style of Soviet apartment

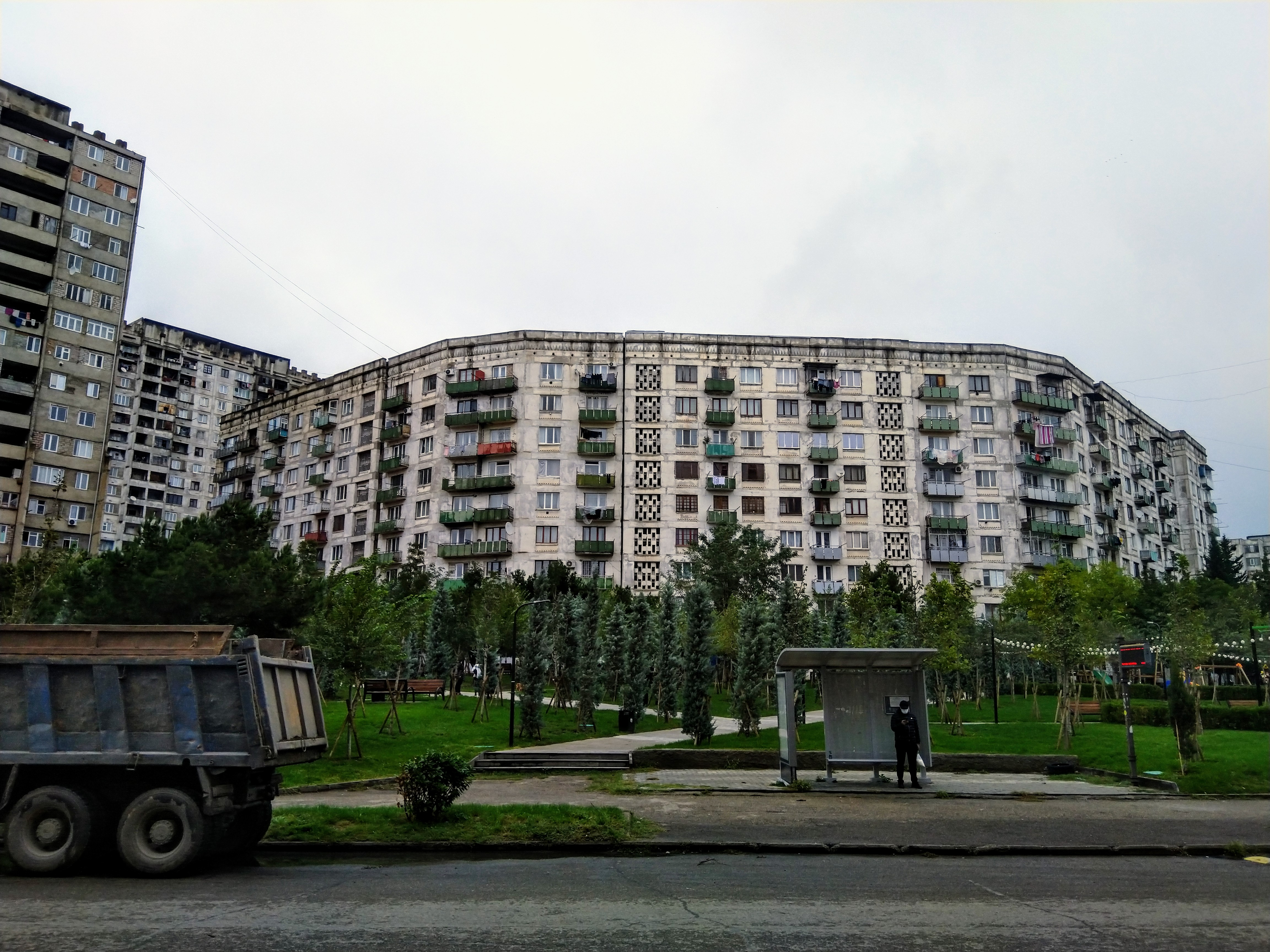
In Varketili district of Tbilisi, Georgia, the mainstay of the apartment buildings are brezhnevkas

A brezhnevka (Russian: брежневка) is a type of concrete apartment building that was built in the Soviet Union from 1964 to 1980 under the leadership of Leonid Brezhnev, after whom the building type is named. The brezhnevka was preceded by the khrushchevka.

== History ==
The brezhnevka originated from a desire for an update to the khrushchevka. As the needs of the population increased, so did the need to build higher-capacity housing. There are now about 40 versions of the brezhnevka.

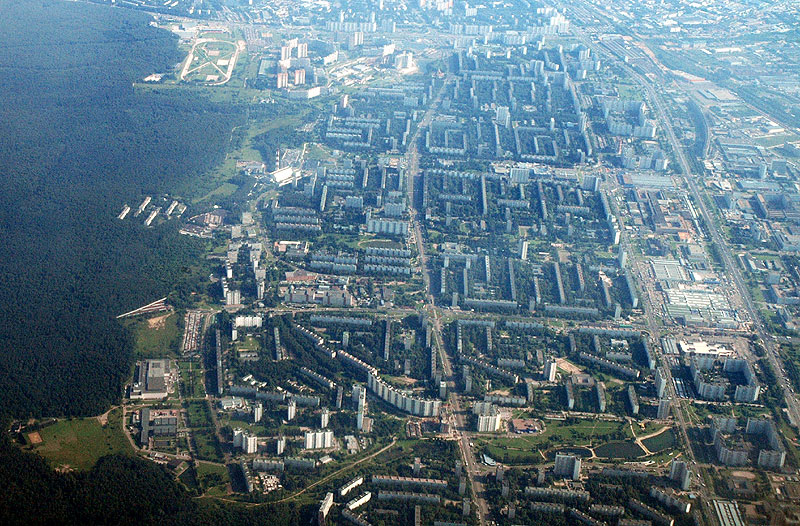
Chertanovo. View from the plane

The peak of construction of "Brezhnevkas" was from the late 1960s to the early 1990s. They were built from reinforced concrete panels or sand-lime bricks, less often from blocks. The reason for the launch of "Brezhnevkas" was the growth of complaints from the population about the quality of housing. The delight of getting your own "Khrushchevka" gradually dissipated, and a compromise was eventually found - "Brezhnevka". Since the early 1990s, "Brezhnevkas" began to be displaced by more modern series of houses and multi-story buildings built according to individual projects with even more improved layouts.

Often, the word "Brezhnevka" refers to 9-story and 10-story panel houses that were built en masse in the 1970s, 1980s and 1990s in the USSR, and then in the countries of the former USSR, since this was the most common type of "Brezhnevka" houses being built, despite the fact that there were many varieties of "Brezhnevkas". For example, in some cities "Brezhnevkas" can be just 5-story. It depends on the architectural planning and building area.

With the start of construction of mass standard housing and due to the fact that in the early 1960s, the issuance of loans for individual housing construction in cities was canceled, the share of this method of solving the housing issue began to decline: in 1981-1986, it accounted for only 6.2% of the new housing stock, or 19.2 million m^{2}. out of 308.7 million built.

Housing was built using funds from local enterprises and councils. There were houses built with money from ordinary citizens who were given the right to join housing cooperatives. The initial payment was 15-30% of the cost of housing, and the rest was paid after moving in at a rate of 0.5% per annum. However, the share of cooperatives in construction did not exceed 10%. Geoffrey Hosking writes in his History of the Soviet Union that owning an apartment in a cooperative house for a Soviet citizen became, in a way, a symbol of an intermediate social status - between the privileged elite and ordinary workers who depended on employers and local councils for housing. However, in order to purchase a cooperative apartment, one also had to stand in line to improve housing conditions, but it moved faster and there were no such restrictions on area: for money, one could afford additional living space. The housing issue was used to motivate citizens. For example, one could get an apartment faster for merits in labor or for participating in important state projects.

== Design ==
=== Exterior ===
Unlike the five-story khrushchevka that precedes it, the brezhnevka contains nine to seventeen stories. It is usually made of concrete panels, though some are made out of brick. The roof is flat and coated with bitumen. A drain is also installed on the roof.

=== Interior ===
The number of rooms in a brezhnevka apartment numbers from one to four. The height of the ceiling reaches 2.7 meters. Kitchens are 6.8 to 7.4 square meters. In the early version of the brezhnevka, the bathroom and toilet were combined. In later versions, the bathroom and toilet are separate rooms.

=== Other characteristics ===
Elevators are installed in the brezhnevka. Under the Soviet building code, buildings were allowed to be constructed without an elevator if they had no more than five floors, and with one elevator if they had no more than nine floors. Thus most brezhnevkas were built with nine floors for higher efficiency. Buildings with fourteen floors had freight elevators as well as passenger elevators. Trash chutes were also installed. The staircases are wider than those of earlier Soviet apartments.

=== International Design ===
The 1980s Brezhnevka-inspired Tongil and Kwangbok Street apartments in Pyongyang, DPRK, share much of the general design and layout of the traditional Soviet constructions; however they scaled approx. 100% larger as this was one of Kim Il Sung's vanity projects.

In Havana and other major cities in Cuba, there have been many Brezhnevka-like mass-produced apartment projects built by the Communist government, most notably in Alamar District. Although inspired by Soviet designs, these buildings differ in lacking winter insulation due to the tropical climate and are more inconsistent in build quality. Room configurations have also been altered to suit Hispanic lifestyles.

The Chinese Government, from roughly the 1960s until the late 20th century when private development was allowed, has created numerous mass-produced socialist housing projects, built on the similar philosophies as Brezhnevka, though these were likely designed wholly independently of Soviet influence due to the nations' political and economic split, being similar as a result of similar design pressures in both nations

=== Criticism ===
- The seams between the concrete panels are prone to separation.
- Poor insulation.
- Bathrooms are small.
- Low quality sound insulation.

== Gallery ==
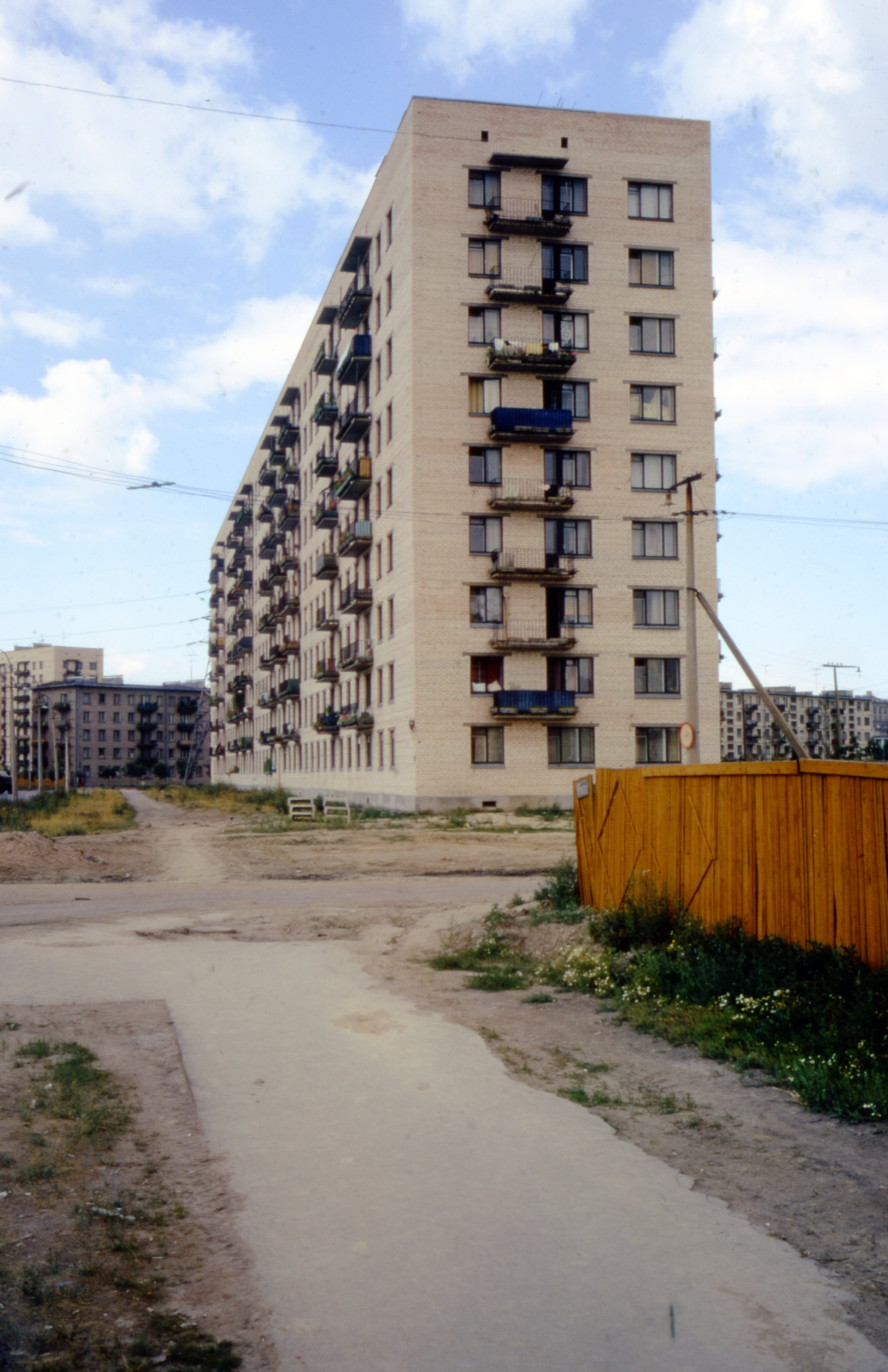
An example of a nine-storied brezhnevka, 1975.

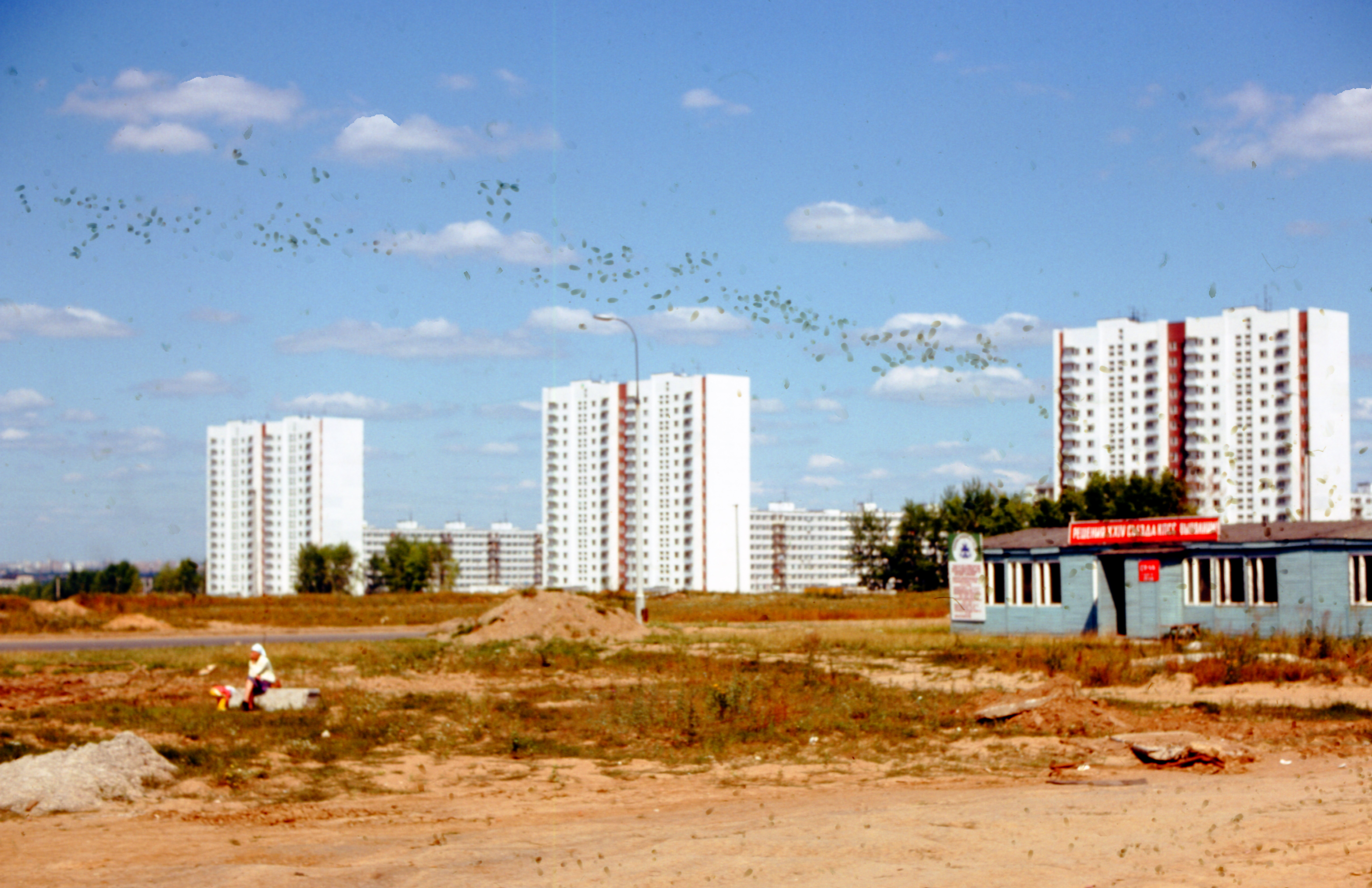
Three tall brezhnevkas with a long brezhnevka in the distance, 1975.

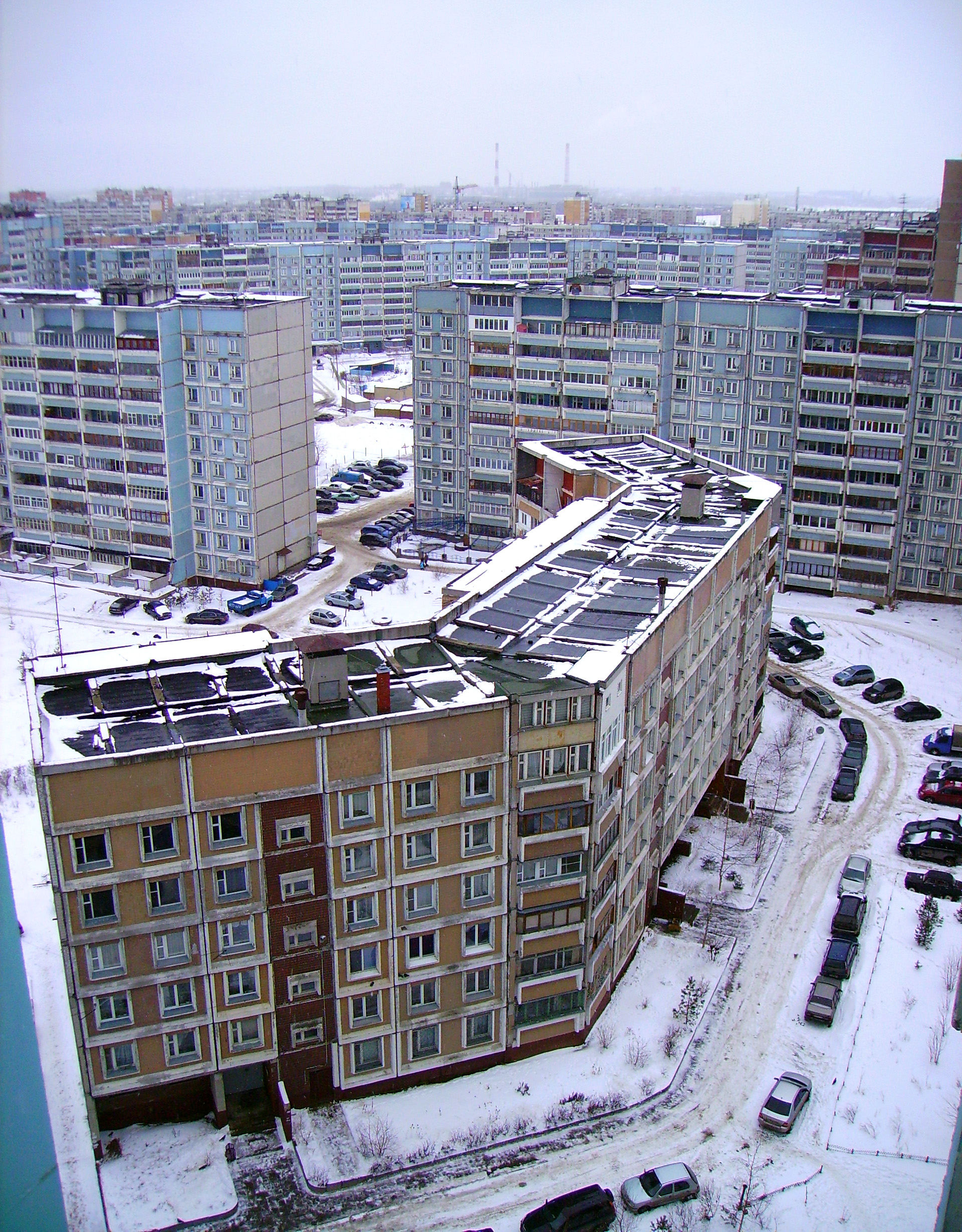
Brezhnevkas in Nizhny Novgorod, 2008.

== In popular culture ==
In the 1976 romantic comedy film The Irony of Fate, the "comedy of errors" originates in the uniformity of Brezhnev-era architecture across the Soviet Union. It is a popular New Year's Eve classic in Russia and a number of other post-Soviet states.
