= Moscow Urban Renewal Initiative =

Public works program in Moscow since 2017

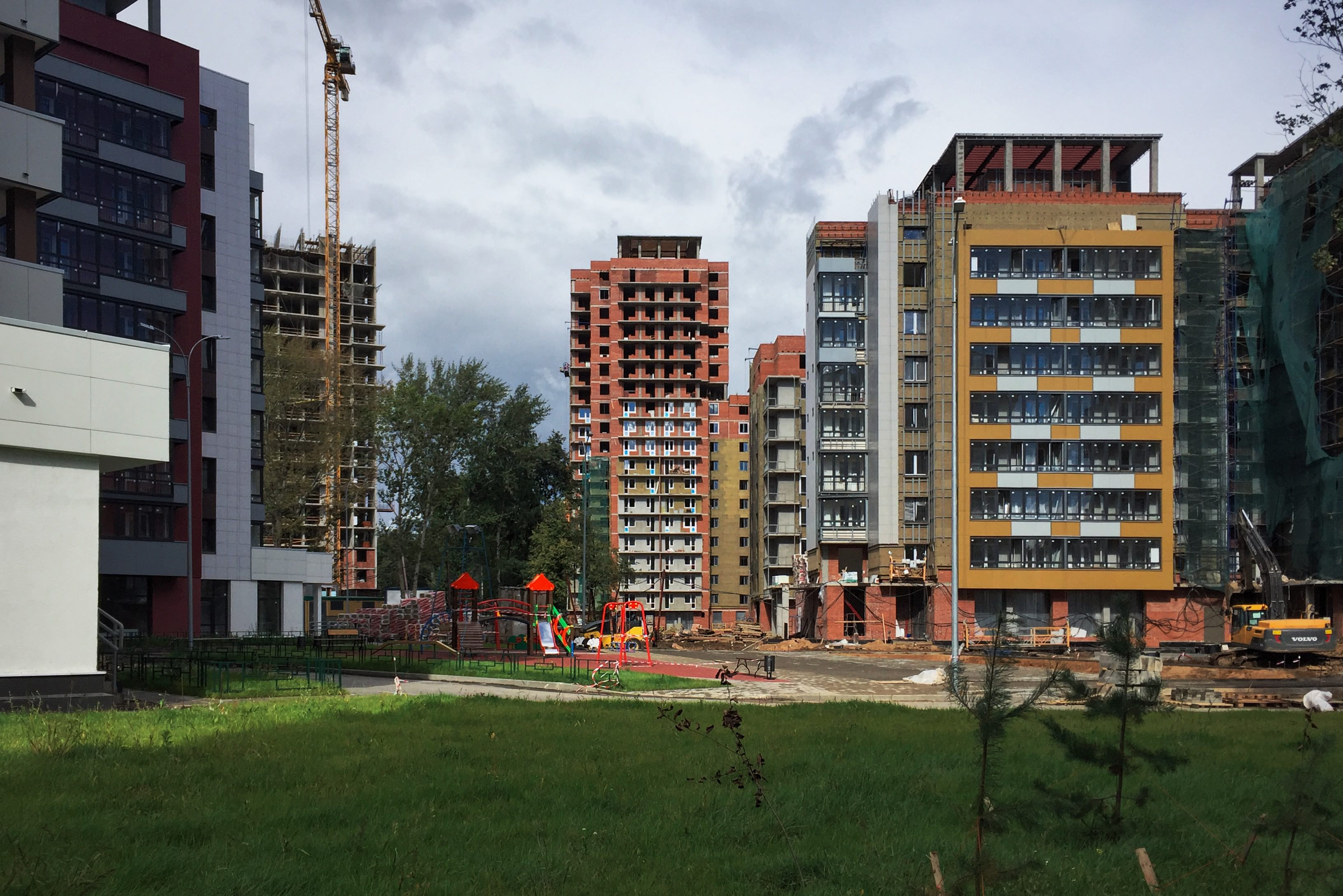
New housing under construction at Dmitrovskoe Highway in Moscow as part of the Initiative

The Moscow Urban Renewal Initiative (Russian: Инициатива обновления городов Москвы) is a vast public works program commissioned by Mayor of Moscow Sergei Sobyanin and Russian president Vladimir Putin. It began in 2017 and is expected to be completed in 2032. The plan includes the demolition of 5,171 dilapidated housing structures in Moscow, colloquially known as khrushchevka, their replacement with modern high-rise residential structures, and the relocation of 1.6 million city residents.

The Molzhaninovsky District of the city became the first district of the capital where the Moscow Urban Renewal Initiative was completed. The success of the program has led to its adoption in other cities and it was included in the updated edition of the Town Planning Code of the Russian Federation. The plan has at times been met with fierce opposition. When completed, it will radically change the physical form and quality of housing in Moscow. The Initiative is being financed through a mix of public and private sector funds.

== History ==
The mass resettlement and demolition of five-story houses from the period of early panel housing construction, known as khrushchevka, was started by Moscow Mayor, Yuri Luzhkov in the 1990s and was carried out as part of the "Program for the Comprehensive Reconstruction of Five-Story Building Areas of the First Period of Industrial Housing Construction." As part of the Luzhkov program, the city expanded plans to resettle and demolish 1,722 structures. The work was carried out by private developers under investment contracts with the city. Amendments to the Land Code adopted in 2007 hampered the work of contractors, obliging them to go through competitive procedures to obtain sites. Due to the 2008 financial crisis, many builders were unable to fulfill their obligations to the city. As a result, the Moscow authorities decided to complete the program with the help of direct funding from the city budget.

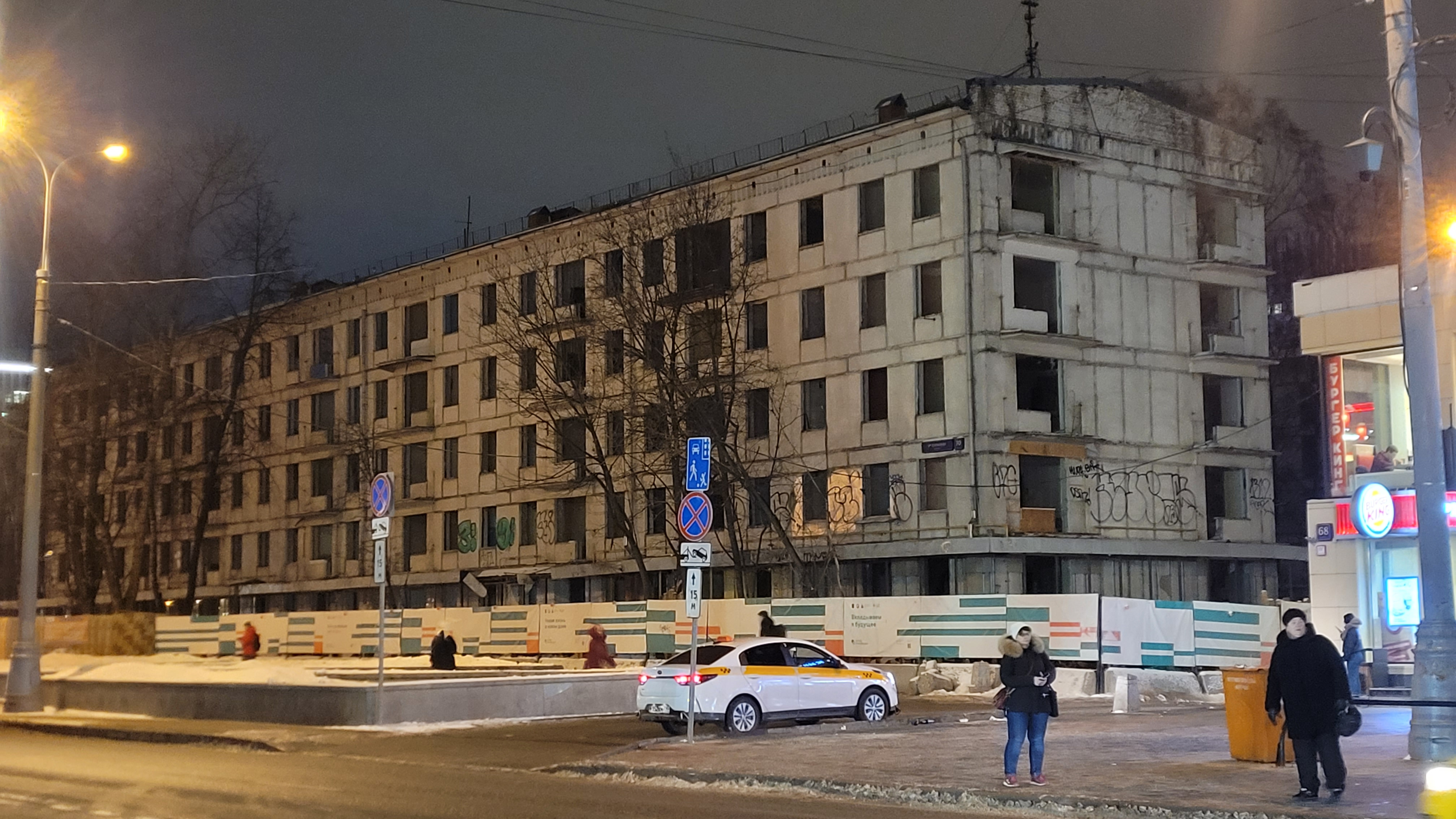
Demolition of 9 Parkovaya as part of the program in Moscow

The issue of continuing the demolition of the deteriorating panel housing stock was again raised in February 2017 at a meeting of the Council of Moscow Municipalities with the participation of Sergei Sobyanin. On February 13, deputies of the Moscow City Duma discussed the need for a new program, including a series previously recognized as "unbearable", and on February 17, members of the Public Chamber of the City of Moscow addressed the mayor with this proposal. At a meeting with Sergei Sobyanin on February 21, 2017, Vladimir Putin instructed the Moscow mayor to continue the resettlement of five-story buildings. Sobyanin highlighted to Putin at that time that the city budget allowed the city to start a new program and lamented the difficulties that the city authorities encountered in the early implementation of Luzhkov's program. The mayor noted that the current civil and urban planning legislation limited the possibility of resettlement of structures not at urgent risk of collapse and asked the president to assist in changing the regulatory framework.

Several sources connected with the mayor's office told Forbes magazine that the prerequisite for the rapid start of the renovation program was the desire of the city administration to avoid the redistribution of Moscow budget revenues in favor of regions with higher debt loads. While talking to journalists, Natalya Zubarevich, Chief Researcher at the Institute for Social Policy of the Higher School of Economics, noted the feasibility of this scenario, since only in 2016 did the income of the consolidated budget of Moscow increase by 188 billion rubles. The interlocutors of the publication also noted that a large-scale renovation program will allow Moscow to attract investment in the construction and related industries.

On March 10, United Russia State Duma deputies Irina Belykh, Vladimir Resin, Nikolay Goncharov, and Gennady Onishchenko submitted to the lower house of parliament a draft law establishing the features of the renovation of the housing stock in the capital of the Russian Federation. The law was popularly called the "Law on Renovation". Subsequently, Mikhail Blinkin, head of the HSE Institute for Transport Economics and Transport Policy, called the publication of the first version of the bill a "set-up": the bill had numerous flaws and became the object of criticism from lawyers and specialists in urban planning and housing policy. Among the critics of the document was the Public Advisory Council under the Moscow City Duma, which noted in an official report that the bill was contrary to the Constitution and other laws, was potentially economically inexpedient, and fraught with negative social consequences.

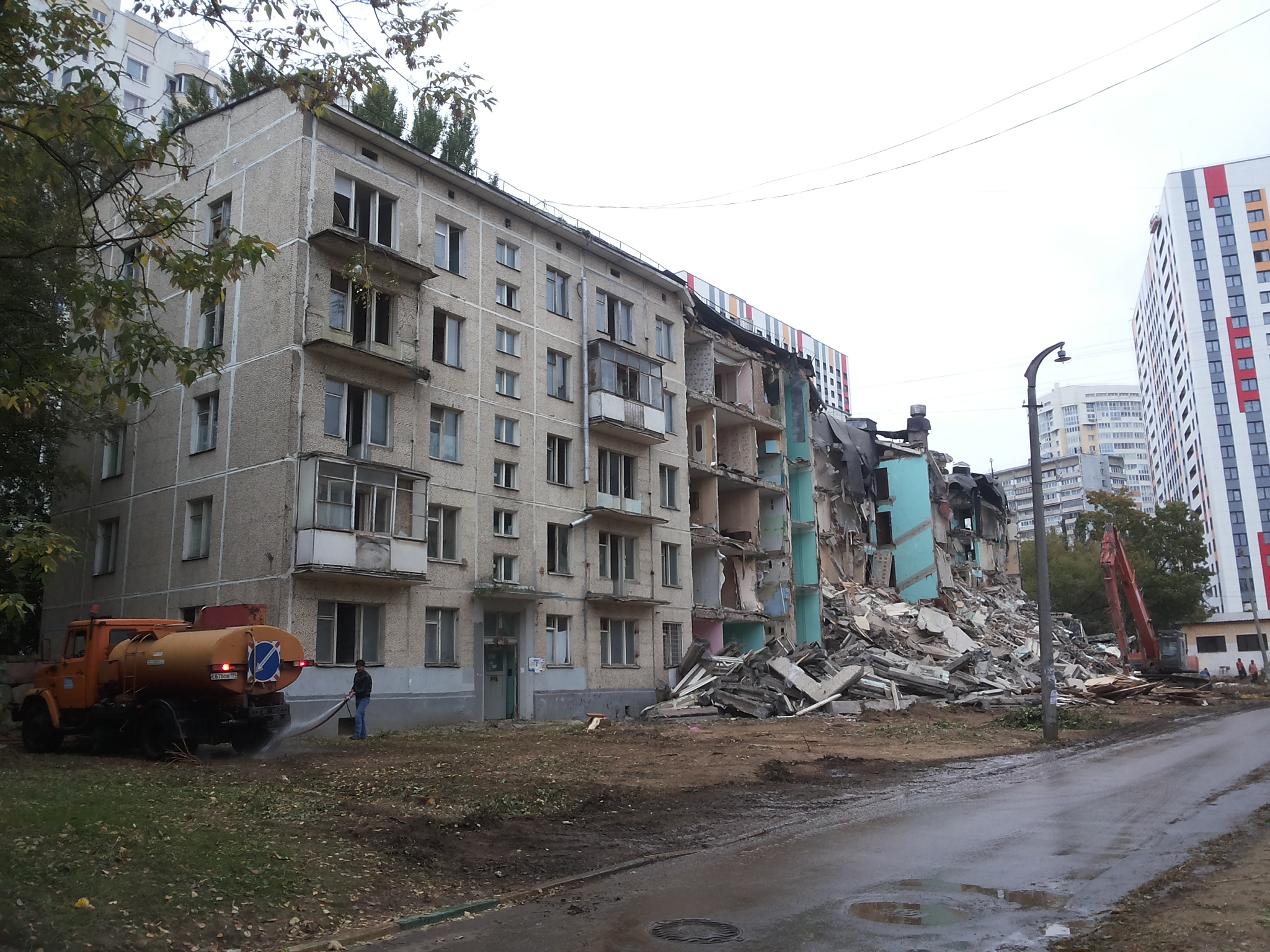
Demolition of a Khrushchevka in Moscow

The bill was discussed in the working group of deputies of the State Duma and representatives of the City Hall. On April 17, some of the changes recommended by critics were adopted by the authors. On April 20, the bill was adopted in the first reading with 397 votes in favor and 4 against. The document was finalized by a team led by the head of the Duma Committee on Housing Policy and Housing and Public Utilities Galina Khovanskaya. During parliamentary hearings in the Duma, a working group was formed to finalize the bill, which included representatives of factions and citizens, including critics of the renovation project. In total, members of parliament and government proposed 144 amendments to the document, of which 90% were accepted, about 20 were rejected. On June 9, the bill passed its second reading. From the first reading to the third, the bill doubled in volume, as its text was supplemented by social guarantees like those enshrined in the Moscow law “On additional guarantees of housing and property rights of individuals and legal entities in the course of renovation of the housing stock in the city of Moscow”, adopted on May 18. On June 14, the bill was adopted in the third reading: 399 deputies voted in favor of it, two against, and one abstained from voting. On June 28, the bill was considered and approved by the Federation Council. On July 1, the law was signed by Russian president Vladimir Putin.

In 2017, "renovation" was chosen as the main word of the year by a Russian language council. Journalists associated it with the resettlement process, which affected millions of Muscovites.

== Implementation of the program ==
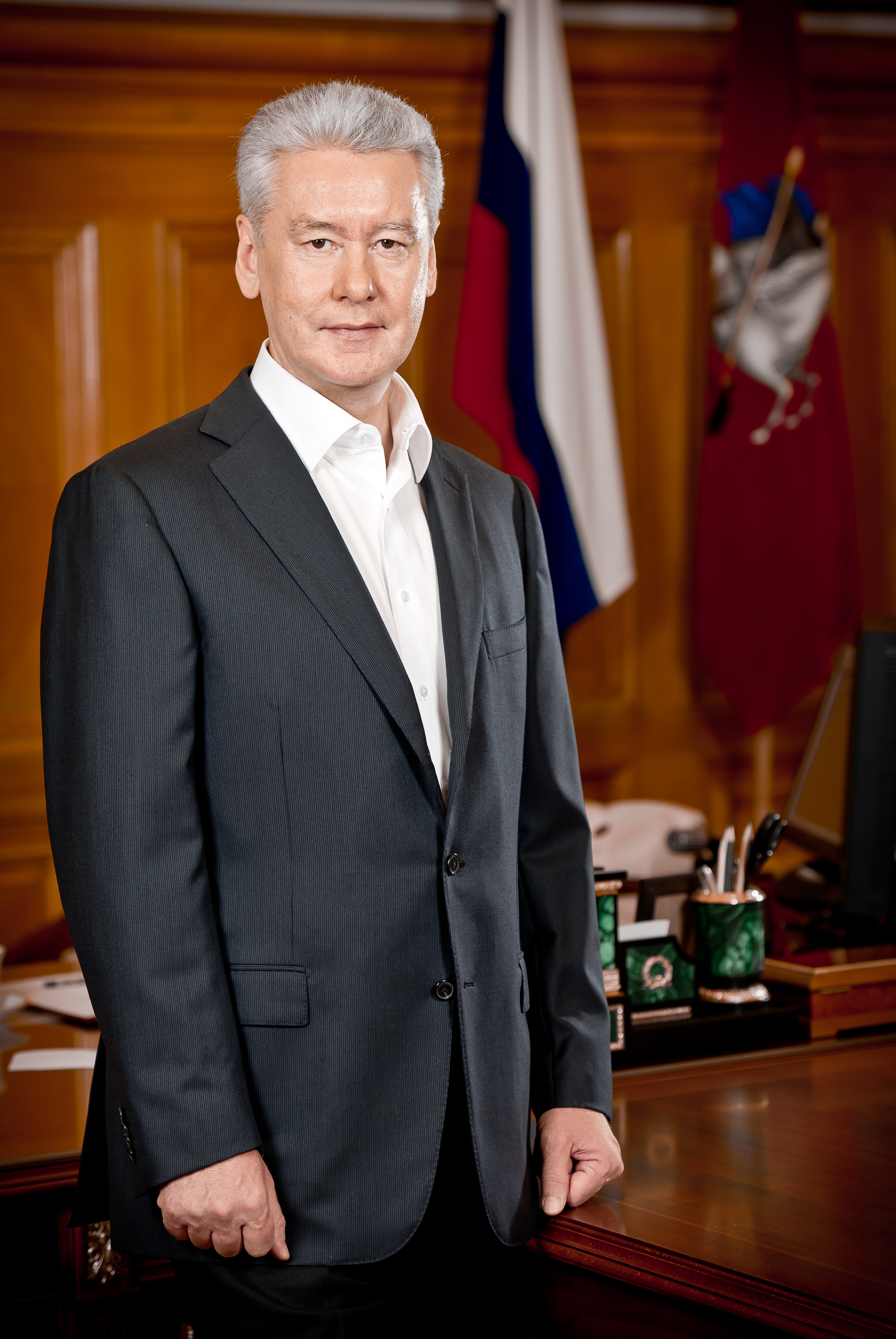
Moscow Mayor Sergei Sobyanin who is overseeing the Initiative and other quality of life projects in Moscow

The initial Moscow Urban Renewal Initiative plan included the demolition of 7,934 structures and the resettlement of 1.6 million people. This information was indicated in a presentation prepared for a meeting with State Duma deputies on the eve of the introduction of the bill. Between March and April, as a result of consultations with municipal deputies and house elders, a door-to-door telephone survey and monitoring of protest activity, structures in 40 districts of old Moscow and 15 settlements in the territories included in Moscow in 2011-2012 were excluded from the list. The list of houses to be included in the renovation program was compiled with the participation of a scientific council under the Department of Cultural Heritage of the City of Moscow and the social movement Archnadzor. Advocates in Moscow ensured exclusion from the program historical monuments without protected status. Houses in 40 workers' quarters built in the 1920s and 1930s were excluded from the program and marked for renovation and not demolition.

In May, the mayor's office published a preliminary list of 4,566 structures in 85 districts of the city: 1,064 in the Eastern Administrative District, 673 in the Southeastern Administrative District, 535 in the ZAO, 524 in the North-Eastern Administrative Okrug, 460 in the South-Western Administrative Okrug, 426 in the SAO, 363 in the Southern Administrative District, 340 in the Central Administrative District, 50 in TiNAO and 34 in Zelenograd. The formal criteria for inclusion were structures built between 1957 and 1968, the use of typical products of walls and ceilings, the condition and structures of a height of no more than 5 floors. In addition to buildings from the period of industrial housing construction, the list includes about 100 buildings from other years, including pre-revolutionary ones, houses from the period of the architectural avant-garde, late Stalinist buildings, and houses built according to individual projects. Between May and June 2017, the mayor's office held a vote for the inclusion of houses from the preliminary list in the renovation program among owners and tenants of apartments. Citizens could cast their vote through the application Active Citizen. To include a house in the program, it was required to collect two thirds of votes "for", for exclusion one third plus one vote "against", the votes of those who refused to participate in the voting were proportionally distributed among supporters and opponents of participation in the program.

The renovation program was supported by 4,087 structures from the preliminary list, while 452 structures opposed. In 31 districts, all houses from the list supported participation in the program, in 2 districts more than half of the structures were excluded from the program: 55% in Moskvorechye-Saburovo District and 51% in Izmaylovo District. Voting was not carried out in 7 structures from the list, because they were abandoned by residents or resettled otherwise. Of the 452 structures excluded from the program, 377 turned out to be constructed of brick. The proportion of residents of brick houses was 84% of all votes against. After studying the voting results, RBC journalists concluded that the choice of Muscovites was practically not affected by the proximity of their structures to Moscow Metro stations and political preferences in the 2013 mayoral elections. Prior to the adoption of the law on renovation, residents of structures not included in the preliminary voting list were allowed to hold meetings of owners and submit applications for participation in the program to district councils.

The preliminary lists did not include panel 9-storey houses which were written in the final version of the bill. In an interview with Komsomolskaya Pravda on May 4, Sergei Sobyanin noted that the mayor's office would consider the possibility of their demolition with the consent of the residents if the houses were included in quarterly development and dilapidated. As a result, about 100 nine-story houses were included in the renovation program. By the end of 2017, 5,171 houses were included in the renovation program. At the same time, decisions of meetings of owners on individual objects were appealed in court, and therefore this list was not final until the resolution of these cases.

== Relocation procedures ==
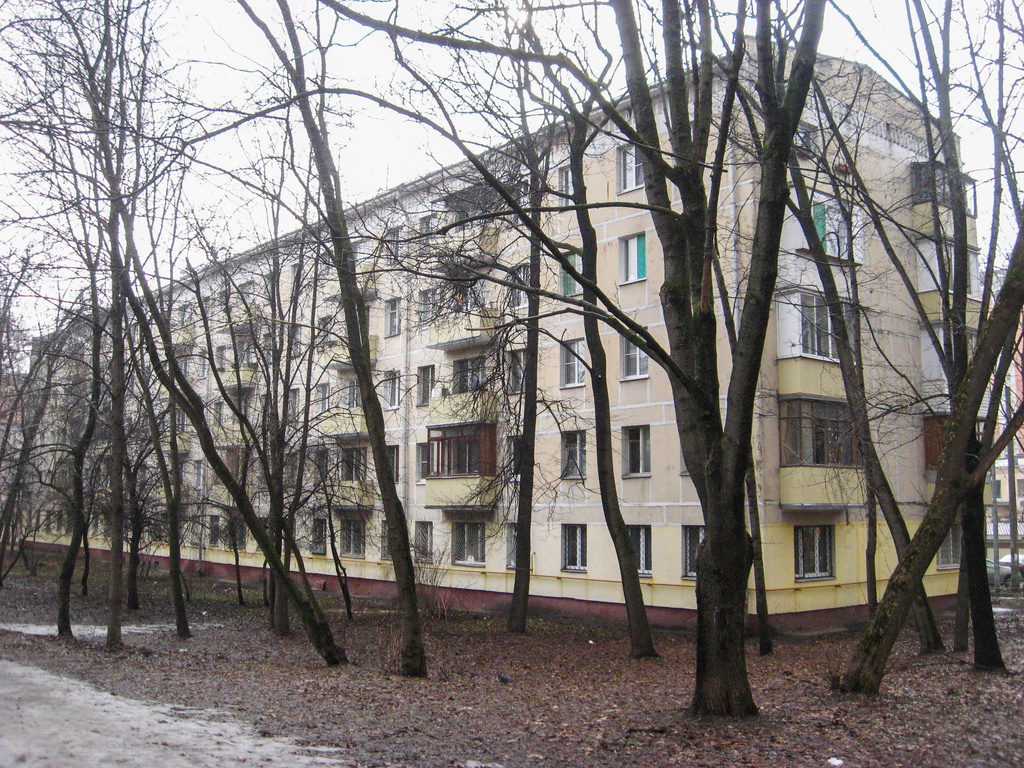
A Series 1–510 in Moscow – a typical structure slated for demolition

The provisions of the bill guaranteed owners of apartments in buildings included in the renovation program to receive "equivalent" housing upon resettlement. This concept was first defined in the Law on Renovation and means an apartment that has a larger total area than the vacated, equal or larger living area and number of rooms. Also, an "equivalent" apartment is provided with finishing and must comply with the legislatively fixed standards of improvement. Resettlement in "equivalent" apartments will be carried out within the area where the vacated apartment is located, an exception is made for Zelenograd and the territory of New Moscow, where resettlement will be carried out within the boundaries of the administrative districts of January 1, 2017. If the apartment is not inhabited by minors, persons with limited legal capacity or incompetent citizens, the owner has the right to choose to receive equivalent housing or monetary compensation. The owner can also pay extra for getting a larger apartment, including by using maternity capital, housing subsidy or social payments. Tenants under a social tenancy agreement will receive equivalent housing and the opportunity to register it as a private property.

In accordance with the law of Moscow dated May 17, 2017 No. 14 "On additional guarantees of housing and property rights of individuals and legal entities in the course of renovation of the housing stock in the city of Moscow", owners of commercial premises in houses included in the renovation program will be able to count on monetary compensation at appraised value or an equivalent property. The state is ready to compensate for the cost of moving for socially unprotected residents. According to the Moscow Chamber of Commerce and Industry, there are about 1,500 commercial premises in private ownership and about 400 in municipal ownership in the renovation zone. According to RBC, the renovation will affect about 2,500 small businesses.

== Design and construction ==
According to Sergei Sobyanin, the number of stories of new construction in the renovation zone will be individually determined for each district and will be from 6 to 14 floors. Earlier, the Deputy Mayor of Moscow for urban planning policy and construction, Marat Khusnullin, reported that in some areas of the city, construction of structures up to 20 floors high is possible. Each of the houses built under the renovation program, according to the capital's department of urban planning policy, goes through six stages of quality control. At the first stage, the layout is checked in accordance with the norms of urban planning. On the second - compliance with safety requirements in residential premises, as well as compliance with soundproofing rules. On the third - compliance with the requirements of the "comfortable housing" standard. On the fourth - the quality of the materials used. On the fifth, there is a general check by Mosgosstroynadzor. At the sixth stage, the project receives a conclusion and, if all the building systems are in good condition, the house receives a commissioning permit.

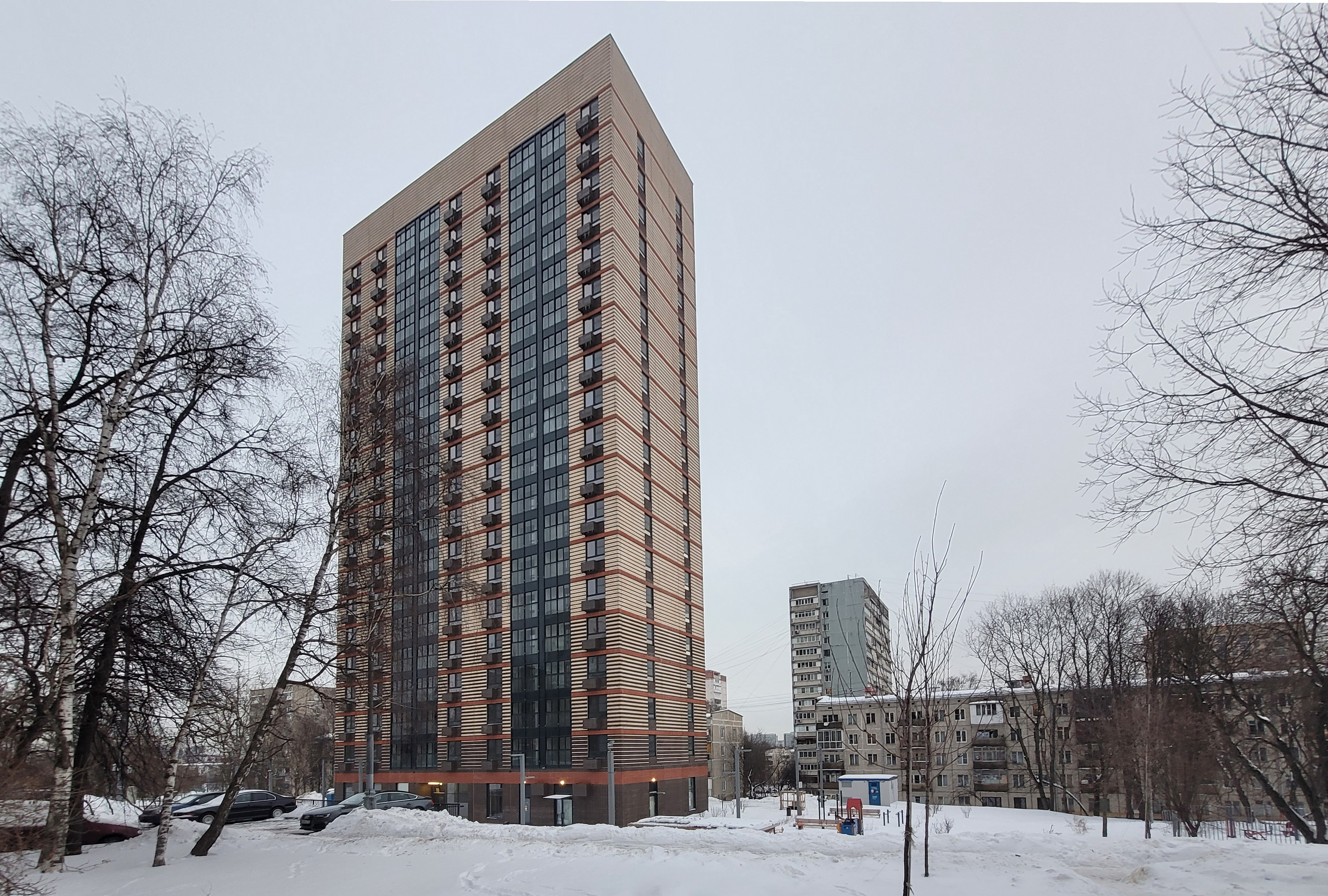
A house under the renovation program in Zyuzino surrounded by five-story panel buildings in 2022

In 2017, an international architectural competition was held to develop development projects for five pilot sites, taking into account the principles of creating a comfortable urban environment. The projects had to be delicately integrated into the existing urban environment, have an integral architectural image, optimize the use of the territory, create high-quality open spaces, include a well-developed landscaping strategy, offer a barrier-free environment with convenient access to social and transport infrastructure and commercial premises on the ground floors. The competition was announced on Sergey Sobyanin's Twitter, personal invitations from him were received by the British architectural firm Foster and Partners and Swiss firm Herzog & de Meuron. The competition jury evaluated the approach to the use of the territory, the variety of housing typologies and the fundamental space-planning decisions of the quarters. The competition received 120 applications from 277 architectural firms, including representatives of 43 international consortiums.

In November 2020, the Look of Renovation competition was launched to develop architectural solutions for houses under the renovation program. The participants of the competition had to offer an individual look for the quarters within the framework of one of 31 competitive lots, which included 89 sites out of 453 included in the program. The competition received 105 applications from architects from 17 countries. 55 architectural bureaus were selected to participate in the second stage of the competition, including Ginzburg Architects, MLA+, Zaha Hadid Architects, Tsimailo Lyashenko and Partners, Asadov, Citizenstudio, Megabudka, Unk project, Master's Plan, Apex Project Bureau and Kamen Architects.

== Chronology ==
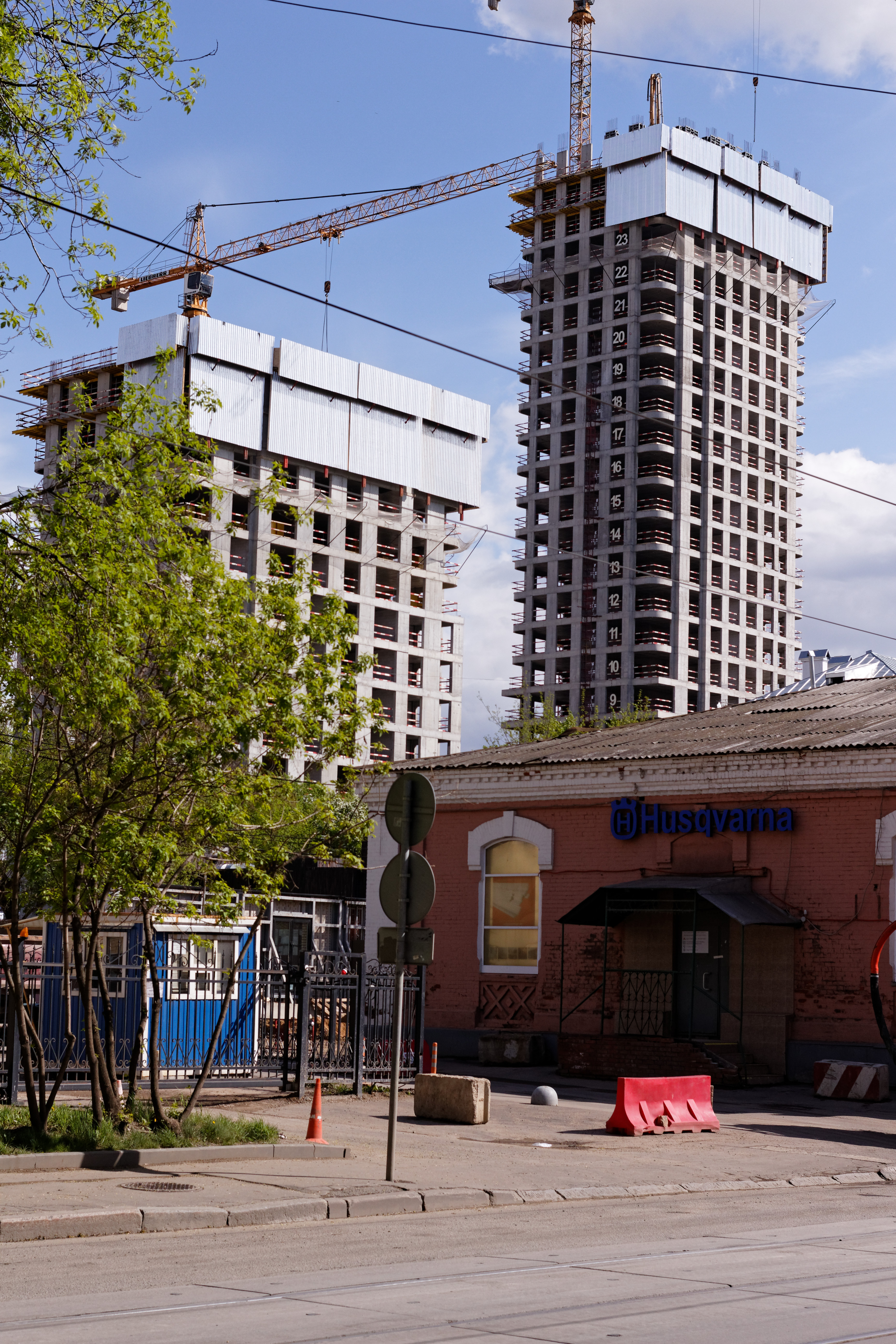
Construction as part of the Initiative at Paveltskaya in Moscow

On April 26, the Moscow City Duma considered and supported the amendments to the Moscow budget for 2017 proposed by Sergei Sobyanin. These amendments increased the expenditure side of the city budget by 96.5 billion rubles, which the mayor's office plans to spend on preparatory measures for the renovation program: the formation of land plots for new construction, the preparation of infill sites for wave resettlement in the renovation quarters and adjacent territories, the implementation pre-project and design work. In May 2017, in an interview with Dmitry Kiselyov, Sergei Sobyanin said that the start of the first wave of resettlement under the program was planned for 2–3 years.

At the start of the program, the mayor's office estimated that implementation would take 10–15 years. The city plans to independently determine the parameters and volumes of new construction, select contractors through competitive procedures and control the process through a specially created state renovation fund. In August 2018, the first Khrushchevka was demolished under the dilapidated housing renovation program. The house was located in Northern Izmailovo. Demolition of houses under the program uses a technology called "smart demolition", which sends a significant part of the materials for recycling.

On March 28, 2019, the first planning projects for renovated quarters in the Solntsevo, Ochakovo-Matveyevskoye, Ivanovskoye, Metrogorodok, Severnoye Tushino, and Mitino districts were submitted for public hearings. In 2019, 12,000 Muscovites received new apartments under the renovation program. In December 2019, the city portal reported that more than 16,000 people had already received new apartments under the program over the two years of its existence. Some people chose new apartments in a larger area, but with a surcharge.

Until June 30, 2020, the stages of resettlement for renovation were not officially published. The stages of relocation were published on August 12, 2020. Three stages are planned:

- Stage 1 (from 2020 to 2024) – 930 structures containing 170,000 residents.
- Stage 2 (from 2025 to 2028) – 1,630 structures containing 330,000 residents.
- Stage 3 (from 2029 to 2032) – 1,800 structures containing 380,000 residents.

According to the Minister of the Government of Moscow, head of the Moscow City Property Department Maxim Gaman, as of July 15, 2021, the Molzhaninovsky District became the first district of the capital where the renovation program was completed. All residents included in this program in the district were satisfactorily settled.

== Public opinion ==
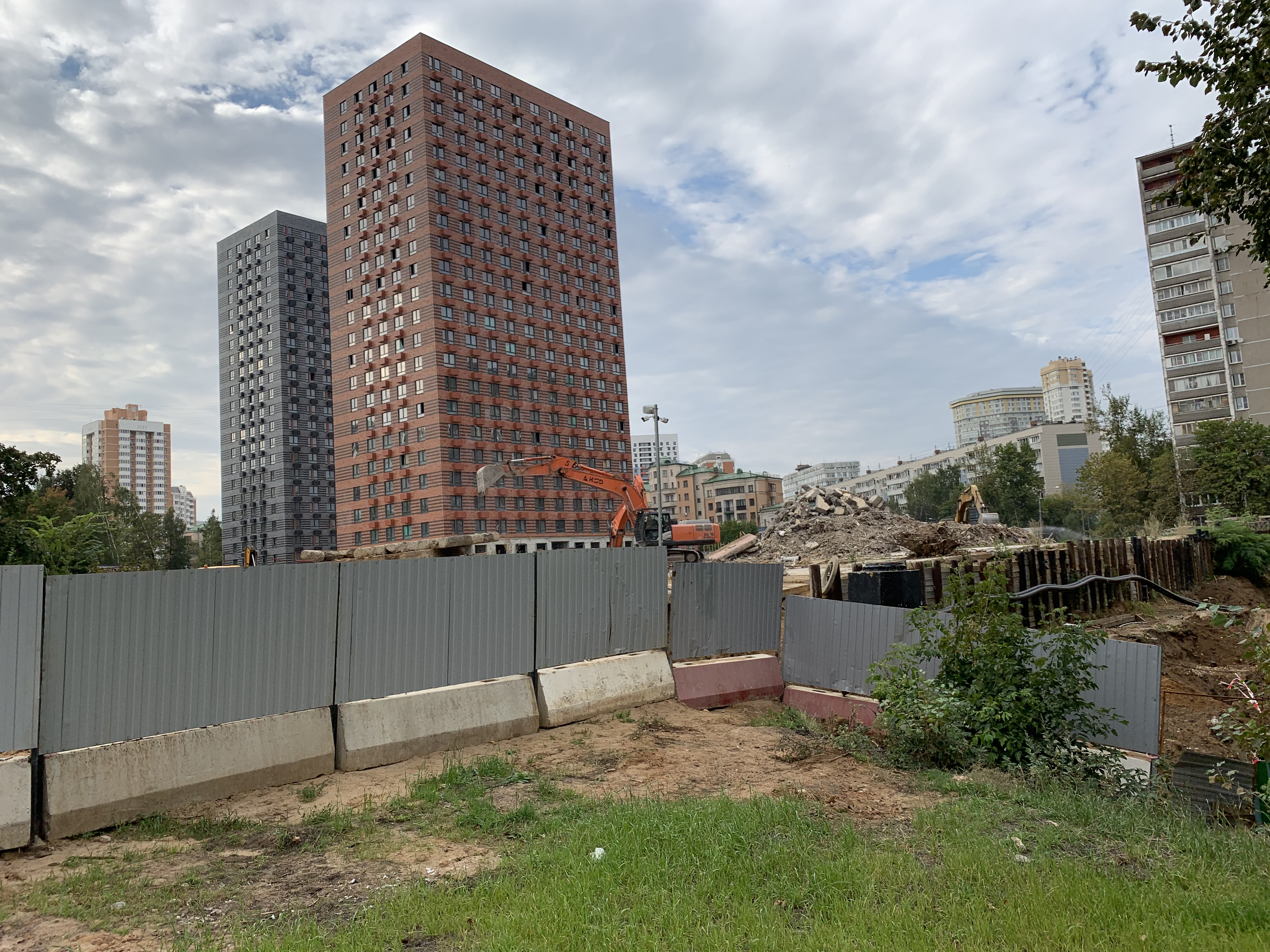
New construction at Kuncevo

As of 2023, 500 documented protests have taken place in Moscow, at which townspeople demanded that their houses be included in the renovation program. According to Rossiyskaya Gazeta, about 35,000 people attended the spontaneous actions. Participants of the protests declared the deplorable state of their houses, demanded inclusion in the program if the house was not on the preliminary list, and prompt resettlement. At these rallies, deputies of the State Duma and the Moscow City Duma, members of the Public Chamber of Moscow spoke to the townspeople: Ivan Teterin, Larisa Kartavtseva, Alexander Kozlov, Pyotr Tolstoy.

Opponents of the Moscow Urban Renewal Initiative have staged rallies as well. Events were organized by municipal deputies Yulia Galyamina and Elena Rusakova, journalists Tatiana Kosobokova and Ekaterina Vinokurova and declared as non-political: the participants stood with posters and banners "We are for the renovation of power", "Against renovation", "No demolition", "Do not break our house", "Izmailovo is against renovation", "Let's save Bogorodskoye", "Marfino is against". Activists of the White Counter movement counted 22,000 people for the rally. In addition to opponents of the renovation, a representative of the city hall tried to make her arguments at the rally, but the crowd booed her, and the organizers turned off the microphone. Politician Dmitry Gudkov, who planned to speak at the rally, withdrew from his speech in solidarity with Alexei Navalny, whom the police removed from the rally at the request of one of the organizers. The resolution of the rally included demands for the rejection of bill No. 120505-7, the abolition of voting in Active Citizen, the expansion of the powers of landowners and a broad discussion of the future master plan of Moscow. After the event, Sergei Sobyanin promised to take into account the opinions of Muscovites and pay close attention to the meaningful statements made at the rally.

== Official statements ==
In June 2017, the head of the Department for External Church Relations of the Moscow Patriarch, Metropolitan Hilarion, spoke in support of the renovation program, noting that the authorities offer favorable conditions to the residents of the five-story buildings being settled and take care of people's safety.

Communist Party leader Gennady Zyuganov said that the deputies of his party conceptually supported the idea of renovation and that after the amendments "the entire bill on renovation was redone in the interests of Muscovites". Moreover, Zyuganov put forward a proposal to extend the renovation to the whole of Russia.

The idea of demolishing Khrushchevka was criticized by several deputies and the media. Criticism was largely that the state does not have the money and resources for this, or that the program is a public relations campaign.

Among critics, the editor of RAPSI noted that there is a successful experience of comprehensive renovation of five-story houses in east Germany without the eviction of tenants, after which the apartments became even more comfortable than in new buildings in Russia. They note that there are similar isolated reconstruction experiments in Moscow. However, the state is campaigning in favor of the demolition of five-story buildings. The reason for this may be the desire to receive material benefits from the compaction of residential areas through the construction of multi-storey buildings and the sale of apartments in them. Taking into account isolated cases of demolitions of Khrushchev districts by private developers and the construction of new buildings, on average, the density of the population increased 3.3 times. It was argued that such programs caused the formation of traffic jams in Moscow.

The environmental organization Greenpeace has estimated that areas where renovation will be carried out will lose up to 25% of green spaces, among which there are especially environmentally effective zones that clean the city air.

According to Konstantin Jankauskas, deputy mayor of Zyuzino District, mass densification is highly undesirable in already overpopulated Moscow. He argued that it will create an even greater burden on social and transport infrastructure and lead, for example, to emergency power outages, queues for spaces in kindergartens, schools and additional hours spent in traffic jams. Residents from areas not included in the renovation program will feel the damage; the expected growth in the supply of inexpensive housing near the Moscow Metro may lead to price declines and a freeze interest in secondary housing. Owners of mortgage apartments in five-story buildings, who risk finding themselves in a legal vacuum, are at particular risk.

Critics made note of the strange criteria for the demolition of five-story houses and that highest priority was given to houses located closer to the city center and more valuable land. Many of these structures were built in the late 1950s of brick and are considered to be more comfortable than panel houses of the 1960s. Editors at Fontanka noted that there are early Brezhnev era buildings in the city that are already in worse condition than some Khrushchevka. Aleksey Abanin from the RTVi website published a list of the most controversial buildings that fall under the “renovation” list, which included pre-revolutionary buildings, Stalinist buildings and German cottages, some of which have recently been restored. However, these buildings are united by low population density.

Another serious problem is the eviction of residents of five-story buildings. Jankauskas noted that there is a situation where a homeowner must be an owner when he pays contributions and taxes, but when it comes to signing a resettlement agreement, he ceases to be one. And current laws do not protect him from forced eviction. Galina Khovanskaya, State Duma deputy from A Just Russia, noted the opacity of the bill and fears that it will leave the owners completely unprotected against forced eviction and relocation to less comfortable housing. Thus, residents have a great chance of getting into the same small apartment in a panel house near the Moscow Ring Road, which will cost 2 times more than former Khrushchevka housing. Similarly, Sergei Mitrokhin from Yabloko pointed out that the first wave of renovations led to the forced relocation of native Muscovites to remote areas, for example, Muscovites from Ostankino were resettled in Otradnoye by a court decision.
